= 2018 NRL Finals Series =

- Duration: 7 Sep – 30 Sep 2018
- Teams: 8
- Premiers: Sydney Roosters (14th title)
- Minor premiers: Sydney Roosters (20th title)
- Matches played: 9
- Points scored: 332
- Highest attendance: 82,688 (Sydney vs Melbourne Grand Final)
- Lowest attendance: 17,168 (Penrith vs New Zealand Elimination Final)
- Average attendance: 36,382
- Total attendance: 327,446
- Broadcast partners: Nine Network; Fox League
- Top points scorer: Adam Reynolds (25)
- Top try-scorer: Tariq Sims (3)

The 2018 NRL finals series determines the winner of the 2018 National Rugby League season. The series ran over four weekends in September 2018, culminating with the 2018 NRL Grand Final at Sydney's ANZ Stadium on 30 September 2018.

The top eight teams from the 2018 NRL Season qualified for the finals series. NRL finals series have been played under the current format since 2012. The qualifying teams are Melbourne, Sydney, South Sydney, Cronulla-Sutherland, Penrith, Brisbane, St George Illawarra and New Zealand.

== Qualification ==
Pos	Team	Pld	W	D	L	B	PF	PA	PD	Pts	
1	Sydney Roosters (M, P)	24	16	0	8	1	542	361	+181	34	Advance to finals series
2	Melbourne Storm	24	16	0	8	1	536	363	+173	34	Advance to finals series
3	South Sydney Rabbitohs	24	16	0	8	1	582	437	+145	34	Advance to finals series
4	Cronulla-Sutherland Sharks	24	16	0	8	1	519	423	+96	34	Advance to finals series
5	Penrith Panthers	24	15	0	9	1	517	461	+56	32	Advance to finals series
6	Brisbane Broncos	24	15	0	9	1	556	500	+56	32	Advance to finals series
7	St. George Illawarra Dragons	24	15	0	9	1	519	472	+47	32	Advance to finals series
8	New Zealand Warriors	24	15	0	9	1	472	447	+25	32	Advance to finals series
9	Wests Tigers	24	12	0	12	1	377	460	−83	26	
10	Canberra Raiders	24	10	0	14	1	563	540	+23	22	
11	Newcastle Knights	24	9	0	15	1	414	607	−193	20	
12	Canterbury-Bankstown Bulldogs	24	8	0	16	1	428	474	−46	18	
13	North Queensland Cowboys	24	8	0	16	1	449	521	−72	18	
14	Gold Coast Titans	24	8	0	16	1	472	582	−110	18	
15	Manly-Warringah Sea Eagles	24	7	0	17	1	500	622	−122	16	
16	Parramatta Eels (W)	24	6	0	18	1	374	550	−176	14	

Updated to match(es) played on 2 September 2018. Source: 2018 NRL Ladder
(M) Minor premiers; (P) Premiers; (W) Wooden spoon

Melbourne qualified for their 8th straight finals series. Sydney qualified for their 2nd straight final series. South Sydney qualified for their first finals series since 2015. Cronulla-Sutherland qualified for their 4th straight finals series. Penrith qualified for their 3rd straight finals series. Brisbane qualified for their 5th straight finals series. St George Illawarra qualified for their first finals series since 2015. New Zealand qualified for their first finals series since 2011.

== Venues ==
The matches of the 2018 NRL finals series were contested at four venues in three different states around the country.

Melbourne's AAMI Park hosted 2 matches, Brisbane's Suncorp Stadium hosted one match and Sydney hosted the remaining 6 matches, which were played at Allianz Stadium and ANZ Stadium.

Melbourne	2018 NRL Finals Series is located in Australia	Sydney
AAMI Park	2018 NRL Finals Series is located in Australia	Allianz Stadium
Capacity: 30,050	2018 NRL Finals Series is located in Australia	Capacity: 45,500
Brisbane	2018 NRL Finals Series is located in Australia	Sydney
Suncorp Stadium	2018 NRL Finals Series is located in Australia	ANZ Stadium
Capacity: 52,500	2018 NRL Finals Series is located in Australia	Capacity: 83,500

== Finals structure ==
The system used for the 2018 NRL finals series was a final eight system. The top four teams in the eight received a "double chance" when they played in week-one qualifying finals, such that if a top-four team lost in the first week it still remained in the finals, playing a semi-final the next week against the winner of an elimination final. The bottom four of the eight played knock-out games – only the winners survived and moved on to the next week. Home-state advantage went to the team with the higher ladder position in the first two weeks, to the qualifying final winners in the third week.

In the second week, the winners of the qualifying finals received a bye to the third week. The losers of the qualifying final played the elimination finals winners in a semi-final. In the third week, the winners of the semi-finals from week two played the winners of the qualifying finals in the first week. The winners of those matches moved on to the grand final at ANZ Stadium in Sydney.

Qualifying and elimination finals
8 Sep, Sydney Football Stadium
1	Sydney	21
4	Cronulla-Sutherland	12
8 Sep, Stadium Australia
5	Penrith	27
8	New Zealand	12
9 Sep, Lang Park
6	Brisbane	18
7	St George Illawarra	48
7 Sep, Melbourne Rectangular Stadium
2	Melbourne	29
3	South Sydney	28

Semi-finals
14 Sep, Sydney Football Stadium
Cronulla-Sutherland	21
Penrith	20
15 Sep, Stadium Australia
South Sydney	13
St George Illawarra	12

Preliminary finals
22 Sep, Sydney Football Stadium
Sydney	12
South Sydney	4
21 Sep, Melbourne Rectangular Stadium
Melbourne	22
Cronulla-Sutherland	6

Grand final
30 Sep, Stadium Australia
Sydney	21
Melbourne	6

== Qualifying & elimination finals ==
=== 1st qualifying final ===
Friday, 7 September
7:40pm

Melbourne Storm	29 – 28	South Sydney Rabbitohs
Tries: Suliasi Vunivalu (32', 40') 2 Cheyse Blair (66', 75') 2 Curtis Scott (23') 1 Goals: Cameron Smith 4/6 (24', 40', 46' pen, 76'); Field Goals: Cameron Munster (77') 1	1st: 16 – 12; 2nd: 13 – 16	Tries: 2 (37', 56') Greg Inglis; 1 (9') Dane Gagai; 1 (62') Robert Jennings; 1 (71') Cameron Murray; Goals: 4/6 Adam Reynolds (13' pen, 27' pen, 57', 73'); 0/1 Dane Gagai; Sin Bin: (45') George Burgess

AAMI Park, Melbourne
Attendance: 17,306
Referee: Ashley Klein, Adam Gee
Player of the Match: Brodie Croft

Team lists:

FB	1	Billy Slater
WG	2	Suliasi Vunivalu
CE	3	Cheyse Blair
CE	4	Curtis Scott
WG	5	Josh Addo-Carr
FE	6	Cameron Munster
HB	19	Brodie Croft
PR	8	Jesse Bromwich
HK	9	Cameron Smith (c)
PR	10	Tim Glasby
SR	11	Felise Kaufusi
SR	12	Joe Stimson
LK	13	Dale Finucane
Substitutes:
IC	14	Brandon Smith
IC	15	Christian Welch
IC	17	Kenny Bromwich
IC	20	Sam Kasiano
Coach:
Craig Bellamy

FB	1	Alex Johnston
WG	2	Campbell Graham
CE	3	Greg Inglis (c)
CE	4	Dane Gagai
WG	5	Robert Jennings
FE	6	Cody Walker
HB	7	Adam Reynolds
PR	8	Tom Burgess
HK	9	Damien Cook
PR	10	George Burgess
SR	11	John Sutton
SR	12	Angus Crichton
LK	13	Sam Burgess
Substitutes:
IC	14	Hymel Hunt
IC	15	Cameron Murray
IC	16	Jason Clark
IC	17	Dean Britt
Coach:
Anthony Seibold

=== 1st elimination final ===
Saturday, 8 September
5:30pm

Penrith Panthers	27 – 12	New Zealand Warriors
Tries: Tyrone Peachey (21', 29') 2 James Maloney (24') 1 Christian Crichton (51') 1 Goals: Nathan Cleary 5/6 (4' pen, 21', 26', 52', 68' pen); Field Goals: James Maloney (60') 1	1st: 18 – 12; 2nd: 9 – 0	Tries: 1 (9') Issac Luke; 1 (14') David Fusitu'a; Goals: 2/2 Shaun Johnson (10', 16')

ANZ Stadium, Sydney
Attendance: 17,168
Referee: Matt Cecchin, Henry Perenara
Player of the Match: Nathan Cleary

Team lists:

FB	1	Dallin Watene-Zelezniak
WG	2	Josh Mansour
CE	3	Waqa Blake
CE	4	Tyrone Peachey
WG	5	Christian Crichton
FE	6	James Maloney (c)
HB	7	Nathan Cleary
PR	8	Trent Merrin
HK	9	Sione Katoa
PR	10	Reagan Campbell-Gillard
SR	11	Viliame Kikau
SR	12	Isaah Yeo
LK	13	James Fisher-Harris
Substitutes:
IC	14	Tyrone May
IC	15	Moses Leota
IC	16	Corey Harawira-Naera
IC	17	James Tamou
Coach:
Cameron Ciraldo

FB	1	Roger Tuivasa-Sheck (c)
WG	2	David Fusitu'a
CE	3	Peta Hiku
CE	4	Solomone Kata
WG	5	Ken Maumalo
FE	6	Blake Green
HB	7	Shaun Johnson
PR	8	James Gavet
HK	9	Issac Luke
PR	10	Agnatius Paasi
SR	11	Adam Blair
SR	12	Tohu Harris
LK	13	Simon Mannering
Substitutes:
IC	14	Jazz Tevaga
IC	15	Isaiah Papali'i
IC	16	Bunty Afoa
IC	17	Gerard Beale
Coach:
Stephen Kearney

=== 2nd qualifying final ===
Saturday, 8 September
7:40pm

Sydney Roosters	21 – 12	Cronulla-Sutherland Sharks
Tries: Cooper Cronk (13') 1 Joseph Manu (39') 1 Latrell Mitchell (52') 1 Daniel Tupou (57') 1 Goals: Latrell Mitchell 2/5 (14', 77' pen); Field Goals: Cooper Cronk (73') 1	1st: 10 – 6; 2nd: 11 – 6	Tries: 1 (6') Sosaia Feki; 1 (45') Edrick Lee; Goals: 2/3 Valentine Holmes (24' pen, 46')

Allianz Stadium, Sydney
Attendance: 24,588
Referee: Gerard Sutton, Ben Cummins
Player of the Match: James Tedesco

Team lists:

FB	1	James Tedesco
WG	2	Daniel Tupou
CE	3	Latrell Mitchell
CE	4	Joseph Manu
WG	5	Blake Ferguson
FE	6	Luke Keary
HB	7	Cooper Cronk
PR	8	Jared Waerea-Hargreaves
HK	9	Jake Friend (c)
PR	10	Siosiua Taukeiaho
SR	11	Boyd Cordner (c)
SR	16	Mitchell Aubusson
LK	12	Isaac Liu
Substitutes:
IC	13	Victor Radley
IC	14	Lindsay Collins
IC	15	Zane Tetevano
IC	17	Ryan Matterson
Coach:
Trent Robinson

FB	1	Valentine Holmes
WG	2	Sosaia Feki
CE	3	Josh Dugan
CE	4	Ricky Leutele
WG	5	Edrick Lee
FE	6	Matt Moylan
HB	7	Chad Townsend
PR	8	Andrew Fifita
HK	9	Jayden Brailey
PR	10	Matt Prior
SR	11	Luke Lewis
SR	12	Wade Graham
LK	13	Paul Gallen (c)
Substitutes:
IC	15	James Segeyaro
IC	16	Aaron Woods
IC	17	Jayson Bukuya
IC	18	Scott Sorensen
Coach:
Shane Flanagan

=== 2nd elimination final ===
Sunday, 9 September
4:00pm

Brisbane Broncos	18 – 48	St George Illawarra Dragons
Tries: David Fifita (17') 1 Darius Boyd (53') 1 Kodi Nikorima (56') 1 Goals: Jamayne Isaako 3/5 (10' pen, 16' pen, 19')	1st: 10 – 28; 2nd: 8 – 20	Tries: 3 (20', 33', 37') Tariq Sims; 1 (28') Leeson Ah Mau; 1 (50') Tim Lafai; 1 (69') Luciano Leilua; 1 (80') Matthew Dufty; Goals: 7/7 Gareth Widdop (5' pen, 22', 29', 35', 39', 40' pen, 51'); 3/3 Zac Lomax (71', 75' pen, 80'); Sin Bin: (79') Nene Macdonald

Suncorp Stadium, Brisbane
Attendance: 47,296
Referee: Grant Atkins, Chris Sutton
Player of the Match: Tariq Sims

Team lists:

FB	1	Darius Boyd (c)
WG	2	Corey Oates
CE	3	James Roberts
CE	4	Jordan Kahu
WG	5	Jamayne Isaako
FE	6	Anthony Milford
HB	7	Kodi Nikorima
PR	15	Joe Ofahengaue
HK	9	Andrew McCullough
PR	10	Sam Thaiday
SR	17	David Fifita
SR	12	Tevita Pangai Junior
LK	13	Josh McGuire
Substitutes:
IC	8	Matthew Lodge
IC	14	Patrick Mago
IC	16	Korbin Sims
IC	18	Kotoni Staggs
Coach:
Wayne Bennett

FB	1	Matthew Dufty
WG	2	Nene Macdonald
CE	3	Zac Lomax
CE	4	Tim Lafai
WG	5	Jordan Pereira
FE	6	Gareth Widdop (c)
HB	7	Ben Hunt
PR	8	James Graham
HK	9	Cameron McInnes
PR	10	Leeson Ah Mau
SR	11	Tyson Frizell
SR	12	Tariq Sims
LK	13	Jack de Belin
Substitutes:
IC	14	Jeremy Latimore
IC	15	Kurt Mann
IC	16	Blake Lawrie
IC	17	Luciano Leilua
Coach:
Paul McGregor

== Semi-finals ==
=== 1st semi final ===
Friday, 14 September
7:40pm

Cronulla-Sutherland Sharks	21 – 20	Penrith Panthers
Tries: Chad Townsend (5') 1 Valentine Holmes (15') 1 Luke Lewis (31') 1 Goals: Valentine Holmes 4/5 (7', 12' pen, 16', 59' pen); Field Goals: Chad Townsend (75') 1	1st: 18 – 2; 2nd: 3 – 18	Tries: 1 (49') Nathan Cleary; 1 (66') Isaah Yeo; 1 (68') Waqa Blake; Goals: 4/4 Nathan Cleary (40' pen, 50', 67', 70')

Allianz Stadium, Sydney
Attendance: 19,211
Referee: Ashley Klein, Adam Gee
Player of the Match: Matt Moylan

Team lists:

FB	1	Valentine Holmes
WG	2	Sosaia Feki
CE	18	Jesse Ramien
CE	4	Ricky Leutele
WG	5	Edrick Lee
FE	6	Matt Moylan
HB	7	Chad Townsend
PR	8	Andrew Fifita
HK	9	Jayden Brailey
PR	10	Matt Prior
SR	11	Luke Lewis
SR	14	Kurt Capewell
LK	13	Paul Gallen (c)
Substitutes:
IC	12	Scott Sorensen
IC	15	James Segeyaro
IC	16	Aaron Woods
IC	17	Jayson Bukuya
Coach:
Shane Flanagan

FB	1	Dallin Watene-Zelezniak
WG	2	Josh Mansour
CE	3	Waqa Blake
CE	4	Tyrone Peachey
WG	5	Christian Crichton
FE	6	James Maloney (c)
HB	7	Nathan Cleary
PR	8	Trent Merrin
HK	9	Sione Katoa
PR	10	Reagan Campbell-Gillard
SR	11	Viliame Kikau
SR	12	Isaah Yeo
LK	13	James Fisher-Harris
Substitutes:
IC	14	Tyrone May
IC	15	Moses Leota
IC	16	Corey Harawira-Naera
IC	17	James Tamou
Coach:
Cameron Ciraldo

=== 2nd semi final ===
Saturday, 15 September
7:40pm

South Sydney Rabbitohs	13 – 12	St George Illawarra Dragons
Tries: Adam Reynolds (56') 1 Goals: Adam Reynolds 3/3 (10' pen, 58', 60' pen); Field Goals: Adam Reynolds (70', 78', 80') 3	1st: 2 – 8; 2nd: 11 – 4	Tries: 1 (36') Ben Hunt; Goals: 4/4 Zac Lomax (23' pen, 38', 54' pen, 76' pen)

ANZ Stadium, Sydney
Attendance: 48,188
Referee: Gerard Sutton, Ben Cummins
Player of the Match: Adam Reynolds

Team lists:

FB	1	Alex Johnston
WG	2	Campbell Graham
CE	3	Greg Inglis (c)
CE	4	Dane Gagai
WG	5	Robert Jennings
FE	6	Cody Walker
HB	7	Adam Reynolds
PR	8	Tom Burgess
HK	9	Damien Cook
PR	10	George Burgess
SR	11	John Sutton
SR	12	Angus Crichton
LK	13	Sam Burgess
Substitutes:
IC	14	Hymel Hunt
IC	15	Cameron Murray
IC	16	Jason Clark
IC	17	Dean Britt
Coach:
Anthony Seibold

FB	1	Matthew Dufty
WG	2	Nene Macdonald
CE	3	Zac Lomax
CE	4	Tim Lafai
WG	5	Jordan Pereira
FE	6	Kurt Mann
HB	7	Ben Hunt
PR	8	James Graham
HK	9	Cameron McInnes (c)
PR	10	Leeson Ah Mau
SR	11	Tyson Frizell (c)
SR	12	Tariq Sims
LK	13	Jack de Belin
Substitutes:
IC	14	Jeremy Latimore
IC	16	Blake Lawrie
IC	17	Luciano Leilua
IC	19	Jai Field
Coach:
Paul McGregor

== Preliminary finals ==
=== 1st preliminary final ===
Friday, 21 September
7:40pm

Melbourne Storm	22 – 6	Cronulla-Sutherland Sharks
Tries: Billy Slater (29', 40') 2 Brodie Croft (20') 1 Goals: Cameron Smith 5/5 (5' pen, 22', 31', 40', 65' pen)	1st: 20 – 0; 2nd: 2 – 6	Tries: 1 (69') Luke Lewis; Goals: 1/1 Valentine Holmes (70')

AAMI Park, Melbourne
Attendance: 26,621
Referee: Gerard Sutton, Ben Cummins
Player of the Match: Billy Slater

Team lists:

FB	1	Billy Slater
WG	2	Suliasi Vunivalu
CE	3	Will Chambers
CE	4	Curtis Scott
WG	5	Josh Addo-Carr
FE	6	Cameron Munster
HB	7	Brodie Croft
PR	8	Jesse Bromwich
HK	9	Cameron Smith (c)
PR	10	Tim Glasby
SR	11	Felise Kaufusi
SR	12	Joe Stimson
LK	13	Dale Finucane
Substitutes:
IC	14	Kenny Bromwich
IC	15	Christian Welch
IC	17	Nelson Asofa-Solomona
IC	18	Brandon Smith
Coach:
Craig Bellamy

FB	1	Valentine Holmes
WG	2	Sosaia Feki
CE	3	Jesse Ramien
CE	4	Ricky Leutele
WG	5	Edrick Lee
FE	6	Matt Moylan
HB	7	Chad Townsend
PR	8	Andrew Fifita
HK	9	Jayden Brailey
PR	10	Matt Prior
SR	11	Luke Lewis (c)
SR	12	Kurt Capewell
LK	16	Aaron Woods
Substitutes:
IC	14	Scott Sorensen
IC	15	James Segeyaro
IC	17	Jayson Bukuya
IC	20	Joseph Paulo
Coach:
Shane Flanagan

=== 2nd preliminary final ===
Saturday, 22 September
7:40pm

Sydney Roosters	12 – 4	South Sydney Rabbitohs
Tries: Daniel Tupou (17') 1 Blake Ferguson (50') 1 Paul Momirovski (71') 1 Goals: Sio Siua Taukeiaho 0/2; Blake Ferguson 0/2	1st: 4 – 4; 2nd: 8 – 0	Goals: 2/3 Adam Reynolds (14' pen, 26' pen)

Allianz Stadium, Sydney
Attendance: 44,380
Referee: Ashley Klein, Adam Gee
Player of the Match: Joseph Manu

Team lists:

FB	1	James Tedesco
WG	2	Daniel Tupou
CE	20	Paul Momirovski
CE	4	Joseph Manu
WG	5	Blake Ferguson
FE	6	Luke Keary
HB	7	Cooper Cronk
PR	8	Jared Waerea-Hargreaves
HK	9	Jake Friend (c)
PR	10	Sio Siua Taukeiaho
SR	11	Boyd Cordner (c)
SR	3	Mitchell Aubusson
LK	12	Isaac Liu
Substitutes:
IC	13	Victor Radley
IC	14	Lindsay Collins
IC	15	Zane Tetevano
IC	17	Ryan Matterson
Coach:
Trent Robinson

FB	1	Alex Johnston
WG	2	Campbell Graham
CE	3	Greg Inglis (c)
CE	4	Dane Gagai
WG	5	Robert Jennings
FE	6	Cody Walker
HB	7	Adam Reynolds
PR	8	Tom Burgess
HK	9	Damien Cook
PR	10	George Burgess
SR	11	John Sutton
SR	12	Angus Crichton
LK	13	Sam Burgess
Substitutes:
IC	14	Hymel Hunt
IC	15	Cameron Murray
IC	17	Dean Britt
IC	20	Tevita Tatola
Coach:
Anthony Seibold

== Grand final ==
Sunday, 30 September
7:20pm (AEST)

Sydney Roosters	21 – 6	Melbourne Storm
Tries: Daniel Tupou (8') 1 Latrell Mitchell (15') 1 Joseph Manu (37') 1 Goals: Latrell Mitchell 4/6 (4' pen, 16', 31' pen, 79' pen); Field Goals: Luke Keary (69') 1	1st: 18 – 0; 2nd: 3 – 6	Tries: 1 (63') Josh Addo-Carr; Goals: 1/1 Cameron Smith (64'); Sin Bin: (30', 78') Cameron Munster

ANZ Stadium, Sydney
Attendance: 82,688
Referee: Gerard Sutton, Ashley Klein
Clive Churchill Medal: Luke Keary

Team lists:

FB	1	James Tedesco
WG	2	Daniel Tupou
CE	3	Latrell Mitchell
CE	4	Joseph Manu
WG	5	Blake Ferguson
FE	6	Luke Keary
HB	23	Cooper Cronk
PR	8	Jared Waerea-Hargreaves
HK	9	Jake Friend (c)
PR	10	Sio Siua Taukeiaho
SR	11	Boyd Cordner (c)
SR	7	Mitchell Aubusson
LK	13	Victor Radley
Substitutes:
IC	12	Isaac Liu
IC	14	Dylan Napa
IC	15	Zane Tetevano
IC	17	Ryan Matterson
Coach:
Trent Robinson

FB	1	Billy Slater
WG	2	Suliasi Vunivalu
CE	3	Will Chambers
CE	4	Curtis Scott
WG	5	Josh Addo-Carr
FE	6	Cameron Munster
HB	7	Brodie Croft
PR	8	Jesse Bromwich
HK	9	Cameron Smith (c)
PR	10	Tim Glasby
SR	11	Felise Kaufusi
SR	12	Joe Stimson
LK	13	Dale Finucane
Substitutes:
IC	14	Kenny Bromwich
IC	15	Christian Welch
IC	16	Brandon Smith
IC	17	Nelson Asofa-Solomona
Coach:
Craig Bellamy
