= 2018 Canterbury-Bankstown Bulldogs season =

Canterbury-Bankstown Bulldogs
- 2018 season
- CEO: Andrew Hill
- Head coach: Dean Pay
- Captain: Josh Jackson
- NRL: 12th
- Top try scorer: Club: Josh Morris 6
- Top points scorer: Club: Moses Mbye 74
- Highest home attendance: 38,824
- Lowest home attendance: 11,247
- Average home attendance: 19,266

The 2018 Canterbury-Bankstown Bulldogs season was the 84th in the club's history. Coached by Dean Pay, they finished the National Rugby League's 2018 Telstra Premiership in 12th place and did not qualify for the finals.

== Player movements ==
=== Signings ===
- Clay Priest from Canberra Raiders
- Fa'amanu Brown from Cronulla-Sutherland Sharks
- Kieran Foran from New Zealand Warriors
- Aaron Woods from Wests Tigers

=== Transfers/Leaving ===
- James Graham to St. George Illawarra Dragons
- Sam Kasiano to Melbourne Storm
- Josh Reynolds to Wests Tigers

== Fixtures ==
=== Trial Matches ===
Saturday, 17 February
5.00pm local

Canberra Raiders	v	Canterbury-Bankstown Bulldogs
12		16

Sunshine Coast Stadium, Kawana Waters

Saturday, 24 February
6.30pm local

Canterbury-Bankstown Bulldogs	v	Penrith Panthers
24		10

Belmore Sports Ground, Belmore

=== Regular season ===
Round	Home	Score	Away	Match Information
Round	Home	Score	Away	Date and Time	Venue	Crowd
1	Canterbury Bankstown Bulldogs	18 – 36	Melbourne Storm	Sat 10 Mar, 8PM AWST	Perth Stadium	38,842
2	Sydney Roosters	30 – 12	Canterbury Bankstown Bulldogs	Fri 16 Mar 6PM AEDT	Allianz Stadium	12,226
3	Canterbury Bankstown Bulldogs	20 – 18	Penrith Panthers	Fri 23 Mar, 6PM AEDT	ANZ Stadium	11,247
4	South Sydney Rabbitohs	20 – 16	Canterbury Bankstown Bulldogs	Fri 30 Mar, 4:10PM AEDT	ANZ Stadium	32,471
5	Canberra Raiders	26 – 10	Canterbury-Bankstown Bulldogs	Thu 5 Apr, 7:50pm AEST	GIO Stadium	11,800
6	North Queensland Cowboys	10 – 27	Canterbury-Bankstown Bulldogs	Sat 14 Apr, 5:30pm AEST	1300SMILES Stadium	14,434
7	Canterbury-Bankstown Bulldogs	0 – 6	Sydney Roosters	Thu 19 Apr, 7:50pm AEST	ANZ Stadium	11,309
8	Penrith Panthers	22 – 14	Canterbury-Bankstown Bulldogs	Fri 27 Apr, 7:50pm AEST	Panthers Stadium	13,760
9	Brisbane Broncos	22 – 20	Canterbury-Bankstown Bulldogs	Thur 3 May, 7:50pm AEST	Suncorp Stadium	22,225
10	Canterbury-Bankstown Bulldogs	20–12	Parramatta Eels	Fri 11 May, 7:50pm AEST	ANZ Stadium	15,683
11	Cronulla Sutherland Sharks	22–16	Canterbury-Bankstown Bulldogs	Sun 20 May, 4:10pm AEST	Southern Cross Group Stadium	14,004
12	Wests Tigers	14–10	Canterbury-Bankstown Bulldogs	Sun 27 May, 4:10pm AEST	ANZ Stadium	18,847
13		BYE
14	Canterbury-Bankstown Bulldogs	16–18	St George Illawarra Dragons	Mon 11 Jun, 4pm AEST	ANZ Stadium	21,376
15	Canterbury-Bankstown Bulldogs	10-32	Gold Coast Titans	Sat 16 Jun, 3pm AEST	Belmore Sports Ground	6,874
16	Newcastle Knights	16-36	Canterbury-Bankstown Bulldogs	Sat 30 Jun, 5:30pm AEST	McDonald Jones Stadium	17,755
17	Canterbury-Bankstown Bulldogs	28-32	Canberra Raiders	Sat 7 Jul, 7:30pm AEST	Belmore Sports Ground	10,145
18	Canterbury-Bankstown Bulldogs	6-24	South Sydney Rabbitohs	Sat 14 Jul, 3pm AEST	ANZ Stadium	14,278
19	Parramatta Eels	14-8	Canterbury-Bankstown Bulldogs	Thu 19 Jul, 7:50pm AEST	ANZ Stadium	8,437
20	Canterbury-Bankstown Bulldogs	16-4	Wests Tigers	Fri 27 Jul, 7:50pm AEST	ANZ Stadium	9,865
21	Canterbury-Bankstown Bulldogs	36-22	Brisbane Broncos	Thu 2 Aug, 7:50pm AEST	ANZ Stadium	6,434
22	Manly-Warringah Sea Eagles	18-6	Canterbury-Bankstown Bulldogs	Sat 11 Aug, 5:30pm AEST	Lottoland
23	Canterbury-Bankstown Bulldogs	27-26	New Zealand Warriors	Sun 19 Aug, 2pm AEST	ANZ Stadium
24	St George Illawarra Dragons	0-38	Canterbury-Bankstown Bulldogs	Sun 26 Aug, 4:10pm AEST	UOW Jubilee Oval
25	Canterbury-Bankstown Bulldogs	18-30	Cronulla Sutherland Sharks	Sun 2 Sep, 2pm AEST	ANZ Stadium
Legend: Win Loss Draw Bye

== Ladder ==
Pos	Team	Pld	W	D	L	B	PF	PA	PD	Pts	
1	Sydney Roosters (M, P)	24	16	0	8	1	542	361	+181	34	Advance to finals series
2	Melbourne Storm	24	16	0	8	1	536	363	+173	34	Advance to finals series
3	South Sydney Rabbitohs	24	16	0	8	1	582	437	+145	34	Advance to finals series
4	Cronulla-Sutherland Sharks	24	16	0	8	1	519	423	+96	34	Advance to finals series
5	Penrith Panthers	24	15	0	9	1	517	461	+56	32	Advance to finals series
6	Brisbane Broncos	24	15	0	9	1	556	500	+56	32	Advance to finals series
7	St. George Illawarra Dragons	24	15	0	9	1	519	472	+47	32	Advance to finals series
8	New Zealand Warriors	24	15	0	9	1	472	447	+25	32	Advance to finals series
9	Wests Tigers	24	12	0	12	1	377	460	−83	26	
10	Canberra Raiders	24	10	0	14	1	563	540	+23	22	
11	Newcastle Knights	24	9	0	15	1	414	607	−193	20	
12	Canterbury-Bankstown Bulldogs	24	8	0	16	1	428	474	−46	18	
13	North Queensland Cowboys	24	8	0	16	1	449	521	−72	18	
14	Gold Coast Titans	24	8	0	16	1	472	582	−110	18	
15	Manly-Warringah Sea Eagles	24	7	0	17	1	500	622	−122	16	
16	Parramatta Eels (W)	24	6	0	18	1	374	550	−176	14	

Updated to match(es) played on 2 September 2018. Source: 2018 NRL Ladder
(M) Minor premiers; (P) Premiers; (W) Wooden spoon

== See also ==
- List of Canterbury-Bankstown Bulldogs seasons
