= 2018 Parramatta Eels season =

Australia Rugby League Parramatta Eels 2018 season

- NRL Rank: 16th
- Play-off result: DNQ
- World Club Challenge: DNQ
- 2018 record: Wins: 6; draws: 0; losses: 18
- Points scored: For: 374; against: 550

Team information
- CEO: Bernie Gurr
- Coach: (Australia) Brad Arthur
- Captain: (Lebanon) Tim Mannah (Australia) Beau Scott (Australia) Clinton Gutherson
- Stadium: ANZ Stadium (Capacity: 83,500); TIO Stadium (Capacity: 12,500)
- Avg. attendance: 11,175 (Home); 16,636 (Home & Away)
- Agg. attendance: 134,096 (Home); 199,633 (Home & Away)
- High attendance: 25,106 (24 March vs Cronulla-Sutherland Sharks, Round 3)

Top scorers
- Tries: (Fiji) Jarryd Hayne (10)
- Goals: (Lebanon) Mitchell Moses (45)
- Points: (Lebanon) Mitchell Moses (106)
← 2017	List of seasons	2019 →

The 2018 Parramatta Eels season was the 72nd in the club's history. Coached by Brad Arthur and co-captained by Tim Mannah, Beau Scott and Clinton Gutherson, they finished the NRL's 2018 Telstra Premiership in last place, and did not qualify for the 2018 NRL Finals Series.

== Summary ==
For the 2018 season, Parramatta were predicted by many before the season to finish in the top 8 and challenge for the premiership. Those predictions were matched in the opening round of the season as Parramatta lead Penrith 14–0 early on but after a second half capitulation lost the game 24–14. In round 2, Parramatta were humiliated 54–0 by Manly at Brookvale Oval. Parramatta went on to lose the opening six games of the season before eventually winning their first game of the season defeating Manly 44–10 in round 7.

In round 8, Parramatta defeated Wests Tigers 24–22 to make it back to back victories for the club. The Eels then went on to lose the next five games in a row before eventually winning their third game of the season defeating North Queensland 20–14 in Darwin in which Jarryd Hayne returned from injury scoring two tries. The following weeks were filled with disappointment as the club came close to pulling off upset wins against top of the table St. George Illawarra only for the club to concede two tries in five minutes to lose 20–18 and South Sydney after leading 20–6 late into the game only for Souths to score late tries and win 26–20. In round 18, Parramatta lost 18–16 to Newcastle with the club being denied a last minute try after it was ruled winger Bevan French had put his foot over the sideline. The following week, Parramatta defeated arch rivals Canterbury 14–8 in what the media dubbed the "Spoon Bowl".

There were hopes that Parramatta could avoid the wooden spoon as going into the second last game of the season the club sat above North Queensland on the table due to for and against. In what was the retiring Jonathan Thurston's final home game, both clubs needed a win to avoid the wooden spoon. North Queensland won the match 44–6. In the final game of the season, Parramatta were defeated 44–10 by the Sydney Roosters ensuring that the club finished last and claimed their 14th wooden spoon and the Roosters claiming the minor premiership. Before the match, the Roosters needed to defeat Parramatta by 27 points to overtake Melbourne and finish first on the table.

== Standings ==
Pos	Team	Pld	W	D	L	B	PF	PA	PD	Pts	
1	Sydney Roosters (M, P)	24	16	0	8	1	542	361	+181	34	Advance to finals series
2	Melbourne Storm	24	16	0	8	1	536	363	+173	34	Advance to finals series
3	South Sydney Rabbitohs	24	16	0	8	1	582	437	+145	34	Advance to finals series
4	Cronulla-Sutherland Sharks	24	16	0	8	1	519	423	+96	34	Advance to finals series
5	Penrith Panthers	24	15	0	9	1	517	461	+56	32	Advance to finals series
6	Brisbane Broncos	24	15	0	9	1	556	500	+56	32	Advance to finals series
7	St. George Illawarra Dragons	24	15	0	9	1	519	472	+47	32	Advance to finals series
8	New Zealand Warriors	24	15	0	9	1	472	447	+25	32	Advance to finals series
9	Wests Tigers	24	12	0	12	1	377	460	−83	26	
10	Canberra Raiders	24	10	0	14	1	563	540	+23	22	
11	Newcastle Knights	24	9	0	15	1	414	607	−193	20	
12	Canterbury-Bankstown Bulldogs	24	8	0	16	1	428	474	−46	18	
13	North Queensland Cowboys	24	8	0	16	1	449	521	−72	18	
14	Gold Coast Titans	24	8	0	16	1	472	582	−110	18	
15	Manly-Warringah Sea Eagles	24	7	0	17	1	500	622	−122	16	
16	Parramatta Eels (W)	24	6	0	18	1	374	550	−176	14	

Updated to match(es) played on 2 September 2018. Source: 2018 NRL Ladder
(M) Minor premiers; (P) Premiers; (W) Wooden spoon

== Fixtures ==
=== Pre-season ===
Round	Home	Score	Away	Match Information
Round	Home	Score	Away	Date and time (Local)	Venue	Attendance
1	Newcastle Knights	6 – 26	Parramatta Eels	Saturday, 24 February, 7:00 PM	Maitland No.1 Sportsground	6,526

=== Home and away season ===
Round	Home	Score	Away	Match Information
Round	Home	Score	Away	Date and time (Local)	Venue	Attendance
1	Penrith Panthers	24 – 14	Parramatta Eels	Sunday 11 March, 3:10pm	Panthers Stadium	21,506
2	Manly-Warringah Sea Eagles	54 – 0	Parramatta Eels	Sunday 18 March, 3:10pm	Lottoland	10,502
3	Parramatta Eels	4 – 14	Cronulla-Sutherland Sharks	Saturday 24 March, 6:30pm	ANZ Stadium	25,106
4	Wests Tigers	30 – 20	Parramatta Eels	Monday 2 April, 4:00pm	ANZ Stadium	30,420
5	Parramatta Eels	6 – 12	Penrith Panthers	Sunday 8 April, 4:10pm	ANZ Stadium	10,061
6	Canberra Raiders	18 – 2	Parramatta Eels	Saturday 14 April, 7:30pm	GIO Stadium	12,328
7	Parramatta Eels	44 – 10	Manly-Warringah Sea Eagles	Sunday 22 April, 2:00pm	ANZ Stadium	11,069
8	Parramatta Eels	24 – 22	Wests Tigers	Sunday 29 April, 4:10pm	ANZ Stadium	17,555
9	Cronulla-Sutherland Sharks	22 – 20	Parramatta Eels	Saturday 5 May, 7:30pm	Southern Cross Group Stadium	12,073
10	Canterbury-Bankstown Bulldogs	20 – 12	Parramatta Eels	Friday 11 May, 7:50pm	ANZ Stadium	15,683
11	Parramatta Eels	14 – 24	New Zealand Warriors	Friday 18 May, 6:00pm	ANZ Stadium	9,467
12	Brisbane Broncos	18 – 10	Parramatta Eels	Thursday 24 May, 7:50pm	Suncorp Stadium	21,555
13	Parramatta Eels	4 – 30	Newcastle Knights	Saturday 2 June, 7:30pm	ANZ Stadium	7,719
14	Parramatta Eels	20 – 14	North Queensland Cowboys	Saturday 9 June, 7:30pm	TIO Stadium	8,393
15	Parramatta Eels	24 – 42	South Sydney Rabbitohs	Thursday 14 June, 7:50pm	ANZ Stadium	8,047
16	St George-Illawarra Dragons	20 – 18	Parramatta Eels	Thursday 28 June, 7:50pm	WIN Stadium	6,933
17	Bye Round
18	Newcastle Knights	18 – 16	Parramatta Eels	Friday 13 July, 7:50pm	McDonald Jones Stadium	15,860
19	Parramatta Eels	14 – 8	Canterbury-Bankstown Bulldogs	Thursday 19 Jul, 7:50pm	ANZ Stadium	8,437
20	South Sydney Rabbitohs	26 – 20	Parramatta Eels	Saturday 28 July, 5:30pm	ANZ Stadium	15,542
21	Parramatta Eels	28 – 12	Gold Coast Titans	Saturday 4 August, 5:30pm	ANZ Stadium	6,158
22	Parramatta Eels	40 – 4	St George-Illawarra Dragons	Saturday 11 August, 7:30pm	ANZ Stadium	10,541
23	Melbourne Storm	20 – 4	Parramatta Eels	Friday 17 August, 7:50pm	AAMI Park	12,136
24	North Queensland Cowboys	44 – 6	Parramatta Eels	Friday 24 August. 7:50pm	1300SMILES Stadium	25,095
25	Parramatta Eels	10 – 44	Sydney Roosters	Saturday 1 September, 7:30pm	ANZ Stadium	11,543

== Players and staff ==
The playing squad and coaching staff of the Parramatta Eels for the 2018 NRL season as of 16 July 2018.

Parramatta Eels
First team squad			Extended squad	Coaching staff
Daniel Alvaro – PR, LK; Dane Aukafolau – CE, WG; Kirisome Auva'a – WG, CE; Nathan Brown – LK, PR; Nathan Davis – WG, CE; Kane Evans – PR; Bevan French – FB, WG; David Gower – SR, PR; Clinton Gutherson (c) – FB, WG, FE; Jarryd Hayne – FB, WG, CE; Josh Hoffman – FB, WG, CE	George Jennings – WG, CE; Michael Jennings – CE; Cameron King – HK; Greg Leleisiuao – WG, CE; Reed Mahoney – HK; Tim Mannah (c) – PR; Suaia Matagi – PR, LK; Manu Ma’u – SR, CE; Tepai Moeroa – SR, LK; Mitchell Moses – HB, FE; Marata Niukore – SR, CE	Corey Norman – FE, FB; Kaysa Pritchard – HK; Jaeman Salmon – FE; Beau Scott (c) – SR, LK; Will Smith – FB, FE; Ray Stone – LK, SR; Brad Takairangi – CE, SR; Peni Terepo – PR, LK; Siosaia Vave – PR; Tony Williams – SR	Oregon Kaufusi – PR, LK	Head coach: Brad Arthur; Assistant coaches: Steve Murphy; Joey Grima; David Kidwell; Nathan Cayless (ISP NSW coach); Dean Feeney (Jersey Flegg coach); Legend: (c) Captain(s); (vc) Vice-captain(s); Updated: 16 July 2018; Source(s): Eels Team Profiles

== Transfers ==
In:

Nat.	Pos.	Name	From	Transfer window	Date	Ref.
(Fiji)	PR	Kane Evans	Sydney Roosters	Pre-season	May 2017
(Australia)	HB	Jaeman Salmon	Cronulla-Sutherland Sharks	Pre-season	November 2017
(Tonga)	SR	Tony Williams	Cronulla-Sutherland Sharks	Pre-season	November 2017
(Australia)	LK	Ray Stone	Youth	Pre-season	November 2017
(Australia)	HK	Reed Mahoney	Youth	Pre-season	November 2017
(New Zealand)	CE	Dane Aukafolau	Youth	Pre-season	November 2017
(New Zealand)	WG	Greg Leleisiuao	Youth	Pre-season	November 2017
(Fiji)	FB	Jarryd Hayne	Gold Coast Titans	Pre-season	December 2017

Out:

Nat.	Pos.	Name	To	Transfer window	Date	Ref.
(Fiji)	WG	Semi Radradra	RC Toulonnais (rugby union)	Pre-season	January 2017
(Portugal)	HK	Isaac De Gois	Retired	Pre-season	August 2017
(Australia)	HB	Jeff Robson	Retired	Pre-season	August 2017
(Tonga)	WG	John Folau	Blacktown Workers	Pre-season	November 2017
(Australia)	SR	Jack Morris	Wentworthville Magpies	Pre-season	November 2017
(Australia)	SR	Cody Nelson	Blacktown Workers	Pre-season	November 2017
(Australia)	PR	Rory O'Brien	Released	Pre-season	November 2017
(Australia)	WG	Scott Schulte	Redcliffe Dolphins	Pre-season	November 2017
(Australia)	WG	Honeti Tuha	Blacktown Workers	Pre-season	November 2017
(Australia)	SR	Joseph Ualesi	Released	Pre-season	November 2017
(Australia)	LK	Matthew Woods	Wentworthville Magpies	Pre-season	November 2017
(Australia)	HB	Troy Dargan	Brisbane Broncos	Pre-season	December 2017
(Samoa)	PR	Frank Pritchard	Retired	Pre-season	January 2018
(New Zealand)	SR	Kenny Edwards	Catalans Dragons	Mid-season	May 2018

== Controversies ==
=== Tony Williams drink driving ===
On 14 February 2018, Tony Williams was fined $1,000, had his driver’s licence suspended for 12 months, and was placed on a 12-month good behaviour bond after appearing in Parramatta local court for mid-range drink driving. Williams had insisted on driving home when his wife came to pick him up after a birthday celebration at the Albion Hotel in Parramatta on 16 December 2016. His three young children were in the car at the time. His driving was so erratic that members of the public called the police, who discovered Williams had a blood alcohol level of 0.122. "Shame on you, Mr Williams," Magistrate Jennifer Giles said at sentencing. She said the "community does not feel safe with you with a licence; you are exceptionally lucky you did not hurt or kill someone, or yourself." Williams also has handed a 2-week suspension by the club.

=== Corey Norman drinking fine ===
In May 2018, Corey Norman was handed a breach notice by Parramatta and fined $20,000 for drinking alcohol and posting pictures of himself drinking on Instagram despite being on the injured list which is against team protocols. Norman reacted to the fine saying "I take full responsibility, I'll cop it on the chin".

=== Kenny Edwards contract termination ===
On May 19, 2018, Edwards' contract with the club was terminated by mutual agreement as the player had been caught by police driving on a suspended licence. Edwards was alleged to have fled from police after trying to avoid a roadside breath test. Edwards subsequently failed to notify Parramatta of the incident for two weeks after it happened. Parramatta released a statement saying "Today, Kenny Edwards through his management company, request a release from his playing contract with Parramatta National Rugby League Club Pty Limited, this release was granted by the club effective immediately".

=== Tony Williams and Nathan Davis failed drug test ===
On September 25, Davis and Williams were both terminated by Parramatta after failing a second drugs test. Both players were found guilty of testing positive for cocaine. As punishment, the NRL handed down a 12 match suspension and a fine to Davis and Williams.
