= 2018 Gold Coast Titans season =

- NRL Rank: 14th
- 2018 record: Wins: 8; draws: 0; losses: 16
- Points scored: For: 472; against: 582

Team information
- CEO: Graham Annesley
- Coach: Garth Brennan
- Stadium: Cbus Super Stadium
- Avg. attendance: 9,278
- High attendance: 18,005 (vs. Brisbane Broncos, round 17)

Top scorers
- Tries: Anthony Don (14)
- Goals: Michael Gordon (58)
- Points: Michael Gordon (132)
← 2017	List of seasons	2019 →

The 2018 Gold Coast Titans season was the 12th in the club's history. The Titans completed the NRL's 2018 Telstra Premiership in 14th place, out of 16 teams, and did not qualify for the finals.

== Ladder ==
Pos	Team	Pld	W	D	L	B	PF	PA	PD	Pts	
1	Sydney Roosters (M, P)	24	16	0	8	1	542	361	+181	34	Advance to finals series
2	Melbourne Storm	24	16	0	8	1	536	363	+173	34	Advance to finals series
3	South Sydney Rabbitohs	24	16	0	8	1	582	437	+145	34	Advance to finals series
4	Cronulla-Sutherland Sharks	24	16	0	8	1	519	423	+96	34	Advance to finals series
5	Penrith Panthers	24	15	0	9	1	517	461	+56	32	Advance to finals series
6	Brisbane Broncos	24	15	0	9	1	556	500	+56	32	Advance to finals series
7	St. George Illawarra Dragons	24	15	0	9	1	519	472	+47	32	Advance to finals series
8	New Zealand Warriors	24	15	0	9	1	472	447	+25	32	Advance to finals series
9	Wests Tigers	24	12	0	12	1	377	460	−83	26	
10	Canberra Raiders	24	10	0	14	1	563	540	+23	22	
11	Newcastle Knights	24	9	0	15	1	414	607	−193	20	
12	Canterbury-Bankstown Bulldogs	24	8	0	16	1	428	474	−46	18	
13	North Queensland Cowboys	24	8	0	16	1	449	521	−72	18	
14	Gold Coast Titans	24	8	0	16	1	472	582	−110	18	
15	Manly-Warringah Sea Eagles	24	7	0	17	1	500	622	−122	16	
16	Parramatta Eels (W)	24	6	0	18	1	374	550	−176	14	

Updated to match(es) played on 2 September 2018. Source: 2018 NRL Ladder
(M) Minor premiers; (P) Premiers; (W) Wooden spoon

== Player movements ==
=== Gains ===
Player	2017 Club	2018 Club	Ref
Jai Arrow	Brisbane Broncos	Gold Coast Titans	
Bryce Cartwright	Penrith Panthers	Gold Coast Titans	
Brendan Elliot	Newcastle Knights	Gold Coast Titans	
Leilani Latu	Penrith Panthers	Gold Coast Titans	
Brenko Lee	Canterbury-Bankstown Bulldogs	Gold Coast Titans	
Will Matthews	St George Illawarra Dragons	Gold Coast Titans	
Jack Stockwell	Newcastle Knights	Gold Coast Titans	

=== Losses ===
Player	2017 Club	2018 Club	Ref
Chris Grevsmuhl	Gold Coast Titans	TBA	
Chris McQueen	Gold Coast Titans	Wests Tigers	
Agnatius Paasi	Gold Coast Titans	New Zealand Warriors	
Leivaha Pulu	Gold Coast Titans	New Zealand Warriors	
Tyrone Roberts	Gold Coast Titans	Super League: Warrington Wolves	
Daniel Vidot	Gold Coast Titans	Retirement	
William Zillman	Gold Coast Titans	Retirement	

== Fixtures ==
=== Regular season ===
Date	Round	Opponent	Venue	Score	Tries	Goals	Attendance
Sunday, 11 March	1	Canberra Raiders	Cbus Super Stadium	30 – 28	Proctor, Elgey, Sami, Copley, Hurrell	Gordon (5/6)	10,238
Saturday 17 March	2	New Zealand Warriors	Mt. Smart Stadium	8 – 20	Don	Gordon (2/2)	14,132
Sunday 25 March	3	St. George Illwarra Dragons	Clive Berghofer Stadium	8 – 54	Gordon	Gordon (2/2)	7,297
Sunday 1 April	4	Brisbane Broncos	Suncorp Stadium	26 – 14	Sami (3), Copley, Don	Gordon (3/5)	30,742
Sunday 8 April	5	Manly Warringah Sea Eagles	Marley Brown Oval	32 – 20	Arrow (2), Boyle, Don, Wallace	Gordon (5/7), Proctor (1/1)	5,135
Sunday 15 April	6	Penrith Panthers	Panthers Stadium	12 – 35	Copley, Don	Gordon (2/2)	11,091
Saturday 21 April	7	North Queensland Cowboys	1300SMILES Stadium	14 – 26	Taylor, Wallace	Gordon (3/3)	12,885
Saturday 28 April	8	Cronulla-Sutherland Sharks	Cbus Super Stadium	9 – 10	Rein	Gordon (2/2), Taylor (1 FG)	12,713
Saturday 5 May	9	Canberra Raiders	GIO Stadium	18 – 32	James, King, Proctor	Gordon (3/3)	11,170
Saturday 12 May	10	Melbourne Storm	Suncorp Stadium	14 – 28	Copley, Lee	Gordon (3/4)	31,118
Saturday 19 May	11	Newcastle Knights	Cbus Super Stadium	33 – 26	Sami (2), Brimson, Copley, Don	Gordon (3/4), Taylor (3/4)	11,008
Saturday 26 May	12	Sydney Roosters	Central Coast Stadium	14 – 34	Don, Gordon	Gordon (3/4)	10,194
	13	Bye					
Friday 8 June	14	South Sydney Rabbitohs	Cbus Super Stadium	16 – 18	Sami, James (2)	Gordon (2/3)	11,833
Saturday 16 June	15	Canterbury-Bankstown Bulldogs	Belmore Sports Ground	32 – 10	Gordon (2), James, Don, Sami, Proctor	Gordon (4/6)	6,874
Sunday 1 July	16	Wests Tigers	Leichhardt Oval	30 – 12	James, Taylor, Brimson, Don, Arrow	Gordon (5/6)	16,984
Sunday 8 July	17	Brisbane Broncos	Cbus Super Stadium	0 – 34			18,005
Sunday 15 July	18	Sydney Roosters	Cbus Super Stadium	12 – 20	Fotuaika, Wallace	Gordon (2/2)	10,074
Saturday 21 July	19	Newcastle Knights	McDonald Jones Stadium	24 – 30	Don (2), Fotuaika, Sami	Gordon (4/5)	14,095
Sunday 29 July	20	New Zealand Warriors	Cbus Super Stadium	36 – 12	Sami (2), Brimson, Don, Hurrell, Lee	Gordon (6/7)	15,149
Saturday 4 August	21	Parramatta Eels	ANZ Stadium	12 – 28	Don (2), Sami	Gordon (0/3)	6,158
Saturday 11 August	22	Penrith Panthers	Cbus Super Stadium	16 – 17	Don, James, Sami	Elgey (1/1), Taylor (1/2)	11,238
Friday 17 August	23	Manly Warringah Sea Eagles	Lottoland	42 – 34	Brimson (2), Don, Rein, Sami, Stockwell, Taylor	Taylor (7/8)	6,382
Saturday 25 August	24	Melbourne Storm	Cbus Super Stadium	8 – 10	Brimson	Taylor (2/3)	14,266
Saturday 1 September	25	North Queensland Cowboys	Cbus Super Stadium	26 - 30	Brimson, Elgey, Rein, Lee	Taylor (5/5)	26,681
Legend: Win Loss Draw Bye
