= 2018 Brisbane Broncos season =

- NRL rank: 6th
- Play-off result: Lost Elimination Final, (St. George Illawarra Dragons, 18–48)
- 2018 record: Wins: 15; losses: 9
- Points scored: For: 556; against: 500

Team information
- CEO: Paul White
- Head Coach: Wayne Bennett
- Captain: Darius Boyd
- Stadium: Suncorp Stadium
- Avg. attendance: 31,234
- Agg. attendance: 374,802
- High attendance: 46,080, (North Queensland Cowboys, 16 March)
- Low attendance: 21,555, (Parramatta Eels, 24 May)

Top scorers
- Tries: Corey Oates (18)
- Goals: Jamayne Isaako (97)
- Points: Jamayne Isaako (239)
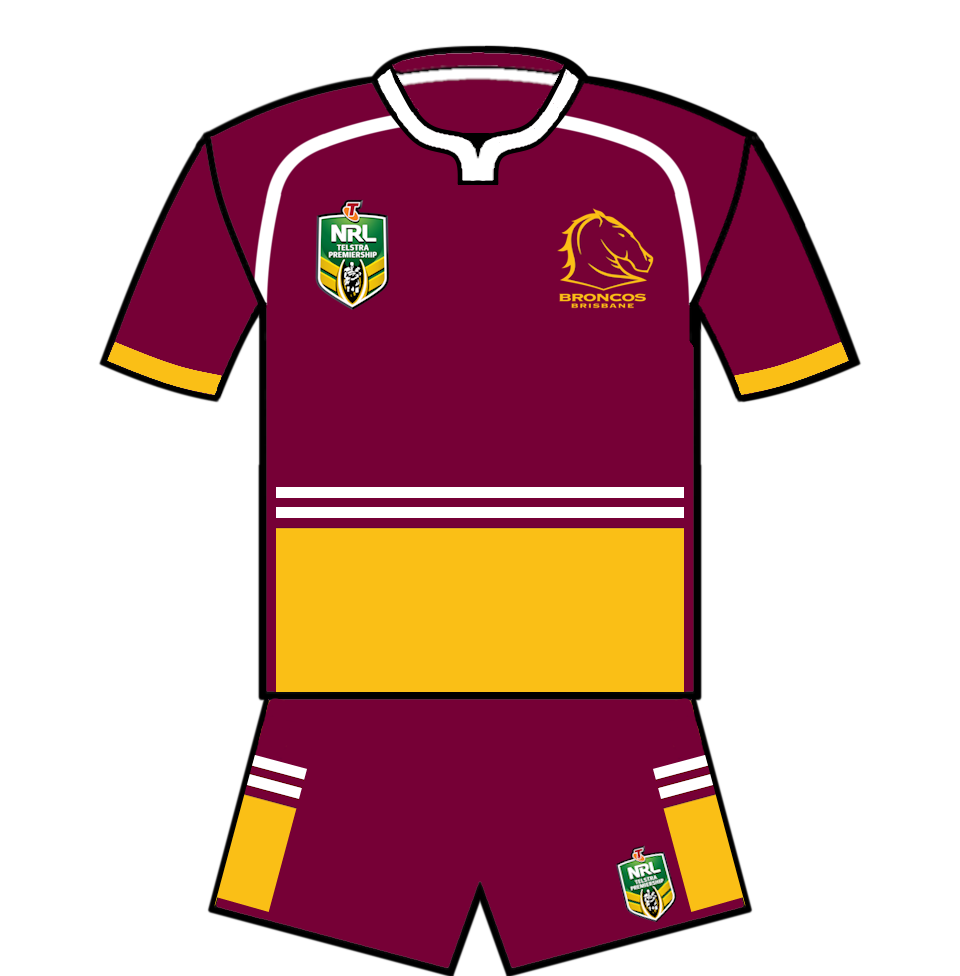
Home colours
← 2017	List of seasons	2019 →

The 2018 Brisbane Broncos season is the 31st in the club's history. This rugby league team is based in Brisbane, Queensland, Australia. Coached by Wayne Bennett, and captained by Darius Boyd, they completed the NRL's 2018 Telstra Premiership regular season in the number six position, qualifying for the finals. They were defeated in the 2nd Elimination Final by St George-Illawarra and did not progress further.

== Season summary ==
=== Pre-season ===
The Broncos entered the 2018 season looking to rebound from their disappointing 2017 finals campaign. The club recruited Jack Bird, Matthew Lodge, Andre Savelio and Sam Tagataese, while long-serving halfback Ben Hunt departed for the St. George Illawarra Dragons. Internationals Adam Blair, Herman Ese'ese, Benji Marshall, David Mead and Tautau Moga had also departed the club. Expectations were high despite the roster changes, with coach Wayne Bennett entering his 25th season as an NRL head coach.

=== Early season ===
Brisbane opened their season with a 34–12 loss to St George Illawarra against Ben Hunt for the first time, before rebounding with close victories over the North Queensland Cowboys and Wests Tigers. Rookie winger Jamayne Isaako quickly emerged as one of the club's breakout players, establishing himself as the side's primary goal-kicker and leading point scorer.

The Broncos struggled for consistency during the opening months of the competition, suffering losses to the Gold Coast Titans, Newcastle Knights and Melbourne Storm, but remained within reach of the top eight due to several close wins.

=== Mid-season ===
During the middle portion of the season, Brisbane began to improve defensively and recorded several important away victories over the New Zealand Warriors, Cronulla-Sutherland Sharks and Canberra Raiders. Young forwards Tevita Pangai Junior, Joe Ofahengaue and debutant David Fifita became increasingly influential in the side's forward pack.

The season also marked several milestones for senior players. Sam Thaiday played his 300th NRL game in Round 22 against the North Queensland Cowboys, while coach Wayne Bennett reached 800 first-grade games coached in Round 12.

Increasing media speculation surrounded the future of coach Wayne Bennett. Despite Brisbane remaining inside the top eight for much of the year, inconsistent form and pressure for long-term improvement led to reports that the Broncos board was considering a coaching succession plan. Anthony Seibold, who was coaching the South Sydney Rabbitohs at the time, was regularly linked to the role as speculation regarding Bennett's future continued throughout the season.

=== Finals push ===
Brisbane won six of their final eight regular-season matches to secure a sixth-place finish on the ladder with 15 wins from 24 matches. The Broncos recorded notable victories over the South Sydney Rabbitohs, Sydney Roosters and Manly-Warringah Sea Eagles during the closing rounds to confirm their finals position.

Corey Oates finished the season as the club's leading try-scorer with 18 tries, while Jamayne Isaako scored 239 points in his rookie campaign.

=== Finals series ===
Brisbane qualified for the finals series for the ninth consecutive season and hosted an elimination final against the St. George Illawarra Dragons at Suncorp Stadium. Despite entering the match in strong form, the Broncos were defeated 48–18, ending their season in the first week of the finals.

== Squad information ==
As of Elimination Final

Cap.	Nat.	Player	Position	First Broncos game	Previous First Grade RL club
128	(Australia)	Sam Thaiday	Prop	2003	—N/a
141	(Australia)	Darius Boyd (c)	Fullback	2006	(Australia) Newcastle Knights
163	(Australia)	Andrew McCullough	Hooker	2008	—N/a
172	(Australia)	Alex Glenn	Second-row	2009	—N/a
174	(Australia)	Josh McGuire	Lock	2009	—N/a
182	(Australia)	Matt Gillett	Second-row	2010	—N/a
199	(New Zealand)	Jordan Kahu	Wing	2013	—N/a
201	(Australia)	Corey Oates	Wing	2013	—N/a
209	(Samoa)	Anthony Milford	Five-eighth	2015	(Australia) Canberra Raiders
212	(Tonga)	Joe Ofahengaue	Lock	2015	—N/a
213	(New Zealand)	Kodi Nikorima	Halfback	2015	—N/a
218	(Australia)	James Roberts	Centre	2016	(Australia) Gold Coast Titans
223	(Australia)	Jaydn Su'A	Second-row	2016	—N/a
224	(Tonga)	Tevita Pangai Junior	Second-row	2016	—N/a
225	(Australia)	Tom Opacic	Centre	2016	—N/a
226	(Australia)	Jonus Pearson	Wing	2016	—N/a
228	(Fiji)	Korbin Sims	Prop	2017	(Australia) Newcastle Knights
231	(Australia)	George Fai	Prop	2017	—N/a
232	(New Zealand)	Jamayne Isaako	Wing	2017	—N/a
233	(Australia)	Matthew Lodge	Prop	2018	(Australia) Wests Tigers
234	(Australia)	Jack Bird	Centre	2018	(Australia) Cronulla-Sutherland Sharks
235	(Samoa)	Sam Tagataese	Prop	2018	(Australia) Cronulla-Sutherland Sharks
236	(Australia)	Payne Haas	Prop	2018	Debut
237	(Australia)	Patrick Mago	Prop	2018	(Australia) North Queensland Cowboys
238	(Australia)	Kotoni Staggs	Centre	2018	Debut
239	(Australia)	David Fifita	Second-row	2018	Debut
240	(Australia)	Jake Turpin	Hooker	2018	Debut
241	(Australia)	Gehamat Shibasaki	Centre	2018	Debut
–	(Australia)	Corey Allan	Fullback	Yet to debut	—N/a
–	(Australia)	Eddie Blacker	Prop	Yet to debut	—N/a
–	(Australia)	Gerome Burns	Halfback	Yet to debut	—N/a
–	(Australia)	Troy Dargan	Halfback	Yet to debut	—N/a
–	(Australia)	Thomas Flegler	Prop	Yet to debut	—N/a
–	(Australia)	Salesi Funaki	Second-row	Yet to debut	—N/a
–	(Australia)	Todd Murphy	Halfback	Yet to debut	—N/a
–	(Australia)	Shaun Nona	Five-eighth	Yet to debut	—N/a
–	(Australia)	Keenan Palasia	Prop	Yet to debut	—N/a
–	(Tonga)	Mosese Pangai	Centre	Yet to debut	—N/a
–	(New Zealand)	Andre Savelio	Second-row	Yet to debut	(England) Warrington Wolves
–	(Australia)	Sam Scarlett	Halfback	Yet to debut	—N/a
–	(Australia)	Myles Taueli	Second-row	Yet to debut	—N/a

== Squad changes ==
=== Transfers in ===
Date	Position	Player	From	Year/s	Ref.
13 April 2017	Centre	Jack Bird	Cronulla-Sutherland Sharks	4 Years	
11 July 2017	Second-row	Andre Savelio	Warrington Wolves	2 Years	
15 September 2017	Second-row	Myles Taueli	Redcliffe Dolphins	2 Years	
4 November 2017	Prop	Matthew Lodge	Redcliffe Dolphins	1 Year	
8 December 2017	Halfback	Troy Dargan	Parramatta Eels	1 Year	
13 December 2017	Prop	Sam Tagataese	Cronulla-Sutherland Sharks	1 Year	
14 December 2017	Hooker	Jake Turpin	Melbourne Storm	1 Year	

=== Transfers out ===
Date	Position	Player	To	Year/s	Ref.
23 January 2017	Halfback	Ben Hunt	St. George Illawarra Dragons	5 Years	
18 July 2017	Centre	Tautau Moga	Newcastle Knights	3 Years	
27 July 2017	Prop	Herman Ese'ese	Newcastle Knights	3 Years	
10 August 2017	Lock	Jai Arrow	Gold Coast Titans	3 Years	
13 August 2017	Five-eighth	Benji Marshall	Wests Tigers	1 Year	
17 September 2017	Prop	Matiu Love-Henry	New Zealand Warriors	1 Year	
4 October 2017	Prop	Adam Blair	New Zealand Warriors	3 Years	
15 November 2017	Second-row	Alex Barr	Wynnum Manly Seagulls	1 Year	
15 November 2017	Hooker	Mitch Cronin	Wynnum Manly Seagulls	1 Year	
15 November 2017	Prop	Aaron Rockley	Wynnum Manly Seagulls	1 Year	
7 December 2017	Lock	Joe Boyce	Townsville Blackhawks	1 Year	
12 December 2017	Wing	David Mead	Catalans Dragons	3 Years	
21 December 2017	Prop	Sam Lavea	Souths Logan Magpies	1 Year	
21 December 2017	Hooker	Travis Waddell	Souths Logan Magpies	1 Year	
29 June 2018	Centre	Marion Seve	Melbourne Storm	2 1/2 Years	

== Coaching staff ==
Name	Role	Ref.
Wayne Bennett	Head coach	
Jason Demetriou	Assistant Coach	
Allan Langer	Assistant Coach	
Jeremy Hicksman	High Performance Manager	
Scott Barker	Head of Performance Analysis	
Tannath Scott	Athletic Performance Coach	

== Fixtures ==
=== Regular season ===
Date	Round	Opponent	Venue	Score	Tries	Goals	Attendance
Thursday, 8 March	Round 1	St George Illawarra Dragons	UOW Jubilee Oval	12 – 34	Roberts (2)	Kahu (1/2)	14,457
Friday 16 March	Round 2	North Queensland Cowboys	Suncorp Stadium	24 – 20	Pangai, Opacic, Glenn, Nikorima	Isaako (4/4)	46,080
Friday 23 March	Round 3	Wests Tigers	Campbelltown Stadium	9 – 7		Isaako (4/4) (1/3 FGs)	11,434
Sunday 1 April	Round 4	Gold Coast Titans	Suncorp Stadium	14 – 26	McCullough, Nikorima	Isaako (3/3)	30,742
Saturday 7 April	Round 5	Newcastle Knights	McDonald Jones Stadium	10 – 15	Oates, Milford	Isaako (1/2)	21,969
Saturday 14 April	Round 6	New Zealand Warriors	Mt Smart Stadium	27 – 18	Isaako (2), Oates, Su'A	Isaako (5/7)	16,636
Friday 20 April	Round 7	Melbourne Storm	Suncorp Stadium	20 – 34	Glenn, Isaako, Milford, Roberts	Isaako (2/4)	32,709
Thursday 26 April	Round 8	South Sydney Rabbitohs	ANZ Stadium	24 – 20	Boyd, Nikorima, Oates, Roberts	Isaako (4/4)	11,123
Thursday 3 May	Round 9	Canterbury-Bankstown Bulldogs	Suncorp Stadium	22 – 20	Glenn, Oates, Ofahengaue	Isaako (5/5)	22,225
Saturday 12 May	Round 10	Manly-Warringah Sea Eagles	Suncorp Stadium	24 – 38	McCullough, Thaiday, Millford, Isaako	Isaako (4/5)	31,118
Friday 18 May	Round 11	Sydney Roosters	Suncorp Stadium	28 – 22	Isaako (2), Oates, Staggs, Roberts	Isaako (4/6)	29,009
Thursday 24 May	Round 12	Parramatta Eels	Suncorp Stadium	18 – 10	Isaako, Oates, Roberts	Isaako (3/4)	21,555
	Round 13	Bye					
Sunday 10 June	Round 14	Melbourne Storm	AAMI Park	16 – 32	Boyd, Isaako, Kahu	Isaako (2/4)	17,106
Saturday 16 June	Round 15	Cronulla Sutherland Sharks	Southern Cross Group Stadium	20 – 16	Pangai, Milford, Oates	Isaako (4/5)	14,587
Saturday 30 June	Round 16	Canberra Raiders	Suncorp Stadium	26 – 22	Oates, Glenn, Kahu, Milford	Isaako (5/5)	30,495
Sunday 8 July	Round 17	Gold Coast Titans	Cbus Super Stadium	34 – 0	Nikorima, Staggs, Boyd, Ofahengaue, Pearson	Isaako (7/7), Kahu (0/1)	18,005
Sunday 15 July	Round 18	New Zealand Warriors	Suncorp Stadium	6 – 26	McCullough	Isaako (1/1)	37,493
Friday 20 July	Round 19	Penrith Panthers	Suncorp Stadium	50 – 18	Pangai (2), Nikorima (2), Roberts, Oates, Boyd, Lodge	Isaako (5/5), Kahu (3/3)	26,357
Thursday 26 July	Round 20	Cronulla Sutherland Sharks	Suncorp Stadium	12 – 10	Oates, Lodge	Kahu (2/3)	22,859
Thursday 2 August	Round 21	Canterbury-Bankstown Bulldogs	ANZ Stadium	22 – 36	Sims (2), Isaako, Milford	Isaako (3/5)	6,434
Thursday 9 August	Round 22	North Queensland Cowboys	1300SMILES Stadium	30 – 34	Pangai, Lodge, Roberts, Sims	Isaako (7/7)	19,663
Thursday 16 August	Round 23	South Sydney Rabbitohs	Suncorp Stadium	38 – 18	Oates (3), Fifita, Nikorima, Sims	Isaako (7/8)	29,241
Saturday 25 August	Round 24	Sydney Roosters	Allianz Stadium	22 – 8	Isaako, Nikorima, Oates	Isaako (5/7)	13,263
Sunday 2 September	Round 25	Manly-Warringah Sea Eagles	Suncorp Stadium	48 – 16	Oates (4), Isaako, Nikorima, Ofahengaue, Roberts	Isaako (8/10)	41,536
Legend: Win Loss Draw Bye

=== Result by round ===
Round	1	2	3	4	5	6	7	8	9	10	11	12	13	14	15	16	17	18	19	20	21	22	23	24	25
Ground	A	H	A	H	A	A	H	A	H	A	H	H	B	A	A	H	A	H	H	H	A	A	H	A	H
Result	L	W	W	L	L	W	L	W	W	L	W	W	B	L	W	W	W	L	W	W	L	L	W	W	W
Position	16	11	7	10	12	8	10	10	9	9	9	9	8	8	8	8	7	8	7	7	7	8	7	7	6
Points	0	2	4	4	4	6	6	8	10	10	12	14	14	14	16	18	20	20	22	24	24	24	26	28	30

Source: National Rugby League
A = Away; H = Home; N = Neutral; B = Bye; W = Win; D = Draw; L = Loss

=== Ladder ===
Pos	Team	Pld	W	D	L	B	PF	PA	PD	Pts	
1	Sydney Roosters (M, P)	24	16	0	8	1	542	361	+181	34	Advance to finals series
2	Melbourne Storm	24	16	0	8	1	536	363	+173	34	Advance to finals series
3	South Sydney Rabbitohs	24	16	0	8	1	582	437	+145	34	Advance to finals series
4	Cronulla-Sutherland Sharks	24	16	0	8	1	519	423	+96	34	Advance to finals series
5	Penrith Panthers	24	15	0	9	1	517	461	+56	32	Advance to finals series
6	Brisbane Broncos	24	15	0	9	1	556	500	+56	32	Advance to finals series
7	St. George Illawarra Dragons	24	15	0	9	1	519	472	+47	32	Advance to finals series
8	New Zealand Warriors	24	15	0	9	1	472	447	+25	32	Advance to finals series
9	Wests Tigers	24	12	0	12	1	377	460	−83	26	
10	Canberra Raiders	24	10	0	14	1	563	540	+23	22	
11	Newcastle Knights	24	9	0	15	1	414	607	−193	20	
12	Canterbury-Bankstown Bulldogs	24	8	0	16	1	428	474	−46	18	
13	North Queensland Cowboys	24	8	0	16	1	449	521	−72	18	
14	Gold Coast Titans	24	8	0	16	1	472	582	−110	18	
15	Manly-Warringah Sea Eagles	24	7	0	17	1	500	622	−122	16	
16	Parramatta Eels (W)	24	6	0	18	1	374	550	−176	14	

Updated to match(es) played on 2 September 2018. Source: 2018 NRL Ladder
(M) Minor premiers; (P) Premiers; (W) Wooden spoon

== Player statistics ==
As of Elimination Final

Players with no appearances are not included on the list.

Player	Games	Tries	Goals	Field goals	Points
Jack Bird	8	0	0	0	0
(Australia) Darius Boyd	25	5	0	0	20
George Fai	1	0	0	0	0
David Fifita	11	2	0	0	8
(Australia) Matt Gillett	5	0	0	0	0
(New Zealand) (Cook Islands) Alex Glenn	20	4	0	0	16
Payne Haas	3	0	0	0	0
(New Zealand) Jamayne Isaako	25	11	97	1	239
(New Zealand) Jordan Kahu	15	2	7	0	22
Matthew Lodge	25	3	0	0	12
Patrick Mago	12	0	0	0	0
Andrew McCullough	22	3	0	0	12
(Samoa) (Australia) Josh McGuire	19	0	0	0	0
(Samoa) Anthony Milford	25	6	0	1	25
(New Zealand) Kodi Nikorima	24	10	0	0	40
Corey Oates	23	18	0	0	72
(Tonga) Joe Ofahengaue	24	3	0	0	12
Tom Opacic	10	1	0	0	4
(Tonga) Tevita Pangai Junior	22	5	0	0	20
Jonus Pearson	2	1	0	0	4
James Roberts	23	9	0	0	36
Gehamat Shibasaki	1	0	0	0	0
(Fiji) Korbin Sims	22	4	0	0	16
Kotoni Staggs	9	2	0	0	8
Jaydn Su'A	15	1	0	0	4
(Samoa) Sam Tagataese	4	0	0	0	0
(Australia) Sam Thaiday	24	1	0	0	4
Jake Turpin	2	0	0	0	0
28 players used	25	91	104	2	574

== Representative honours ==
This table lists all players who played a representative match in 2018.

Player	State of Origin 1	Mid-season Tests	State of Origin 2	State of Origin 3	Post-season Tests
Corey Allan	–	–	–	–	Prime Minister's XIII & Junior Kangaroos
Patrick Carrigan	–	–	–	–	Junior Kangaroos
Thomas Flegler	–	–	–	–	Junior Kangaroos
Jamayne Isaako	—N/a	New Zealand	—N/a	—N/a	New Zealand
Andrew McCullough	Queensland	–	Queensland	Queensland	–
Josh McGuire	Queensland	–	Queensland	Queensland	Australia
Anthony Milford	Queensland	Samoa	–	–	–
Kodi Nikorima	–	New Zealand	–	–	New Zealand
Corey Oates	–	–	–	Queensland	–
Joe Ofahengaue	–	Tonga	–	–	Tonga
Tevita Pangai Junior	–	–	–	–	Tonga
James Roberts	New South Wales	–	New South Wales	New South Wales	–
Gehamat Shibasaki	–	–	–	–	Prime Minister's XIII
Kotoni Staggs	–	–	–	–	Junior Kangaroos

== Awards ==
=== 2018 Dally M Awards ===
- Rookie of the Year: Jamayne Isaako
- Top point scorer of the Year: Jamayne Isaako
- Female Player of the Year: Brittany Breayley

=== Broncos Awards Night ===
Held at Brisbane Convention & Exhibition Centre on Saturday, 6 October 2018.

- Paul Morgan Medal (Player of the Year): Anthony Milford
- Players' Player: Joe Ofahengaue
- Fans' Player of the Year: Corey Oates
- Best Back (Allan Langer Award): Corey Oates
- Best Forward (Shane Webcke Award): Matthew Lodge
- Most Consistent (Kevin Walters Award): Alex Glenn
- Rookie of the Year (Cyril Connell Award): Jamayne Isaako
- Play of the Year: Jamayne Isaako – Round 11 vs Roosters, Jamayne Isaako try, 77th minute
- NRLW Player of the Year: Brittany Breayley
- NRLW Players' Player: Kimiora Nati
- NRLW Best Back: Kimiora Nati
- NRLW Best Forward: Brittany Breayley

=== QRL Awards ===
- Queensland Cup Centre of the Year: Kotoni Staggs (Redcliffe Dolphins)
- Mal Meninga Cup Player of the Year: David Fifita (Souths Logan Magpies)
- Representative Player of the Year: David Fifita (Queensland Under 18s)

=== Rugby League Players’ Association Awards ===
- Winger of the Year: Jamayne Isaako

== NRLW (Women's) ==
In September 2018, the NRL Women's Premiership (NRLW) held its inaugural season, featuring four teams: the Brisbane Broncos Women, New Zealand Warriors Women, St. George Illawarra Dragons Women and the Sydney Roosters Women.

The Broncos finished the round-robin stage undefeated (3–0), securing the inaugural minor premiership, while the other three teams each finished 1–2. The Broncos went on to win the Grand Final, defeating the Sydney Roosters 34–12 to claim the competition’s inaugural premiership. The match was played at Stadium Australia as a curtain-raiser to the 2018 NRL Grand Final.

The team was coached by Paul Dyer and captained by Ali Brigginshaw with Brittany Breayley vice-captain.

== Feeder clubs ==
In 2018, the Broncos feeder teams were the Norths Devils, Redcliffe Dolphins, Souths Logan Magpies and Wynnum Manly Seagulls. Only the Dolphins made the finals, while the Magpies dropped out from last year's finals teams; the other two again failed to finish inside the top 6 for another year.

=== Ladder ===
Top 6 teams qualified for the finals series.

2018 Queensland Cup
Pos	Team	Pld	W	D	L	B	PF	PA	PD	Pts
1	Redcliffe Dolphins (P)	23	16	1	6	1	600	382	+218	35
8	Norths Devils	23	11	0	12	1	516	553	-37	24
9	Souths Logan Magpies	23	10	0	13	1	534	499	+35	22
12	Wynnum Manly Seagulls	23	9	0	14	1	472	593	-121	20
