= 2018 South Sydney Rabbitohs season =

- NRL Rank: 3rd
- Play-off result: Preliminary Final
- 2018 record: Wins: 16; draws: 0; losses: 8
- Points scored: For: 582; against: 437

Team information
- CEO: Shane Richardson
- Head Coach: Anthony Seibold
- Captain: Greg Inglis
- Stadium: ANZ Stadium; Optus Stadium (Round 1 only); Central Coast Stadium (Round 7 only); Barlow Park (Round 16 only); Glen Willow Oval (Charity Shield only)
- Avg. attendance: 17,351 (Regular Season) 36,625 (Finals)
- High attendance: 38,824 (vs. New Zealand Warriors in round 1 of Regular Season) 48,188 (vs. St George Illawarra Dragons in week 2 of Finals)

Top scorers
- Tries: Robert Jennings (19)
- Goals: Adam Reynolds (91)
- Points: Adam Reynolds (207)
← 2017	List of seasons	2019 →

The 2018 South Sydney Rabbitohs season was the 109th in the club's history. Coached by Anthony Seibold and captained by Greg Inglis, they competed in the National Rugby League's 2018 Telstra Premiership.

== Squad movements ==
=== Gains ===
Player	Signed from	Ref
Mark Nicholls	Melbourne Storm	
Dane Gagai	Newcastle Knights	

=== Losses ===
Player	2018 club	Ref
Bryson Goodwin	Super League: Warrington Wolves	
Aaron Gray	Cronulla-Sutherland Sharks	
Dave Tyrrell	Eastern Suburbs Tigers (Intrust Super Cup)	

== Ladder ==
Pos	Team	Pld	W	D	L	B	PF	PA	PD	Pts	
1	Sydney Roosters (M, P)	24	16	0	8	1	542	361	+181	34	Advance to finals series
2	Melbourne Storm	24	16	0	8	1	536	363	+173	34	Advance to finals series
3	South Sydney Rabbitohs	24	16	0	8	1	582	437	+145	34	Advance to finals series
4	Cronulla-Sutherland Sharks	24	16	0	8	1	519	423	+96	34	Advance to finals series
5	Penrith Panthers	24	15	0	9	1	517	461	+56	32	Advance to finals series
6	Brisbane Broncos	24	15	0	9	1	556	500	+56	32	Advance to finals series
7	St. George Illawarra Dragons	24	15	0	9	1	519	472	+47	32	Advance to finals series
8	New Zealand Warriors	24	15	0	9	1	472	447	+25	32	Advance to finals series
9	Wests Tigers	24	12	0	12	1	377	460	−83	26	
10	Canberra Raiders	24	10	0	14	1	563	540	+23	22	
11	Newcastle Knights	24	9	0	15	1	414	607	−193	20	
12	Canterbury-Bankstown Bulldogs	24	8	0	16	1	428	474	−46	18	
13	North Queensland Cowboys	24	8	0	16	1	449	521	−72	18	
14	Gold Coast Titans	24	8	0	16	1	472	582	−110	18	
15	Manly-Warringah Sea Eagles	24	7	0	17	1	500	622	−122	16	
16	Parramatta Eels (W)	24	6	0	18	1	374	550	−176	14	

Updated to match(es) played on 2 September 2018. Source: 2018 NRL Ladder
(M) Minor premiers; (P) Premiers; (W) Wooden spoon

== Pre-season ==
Date	Opponent	Venue	Score	Tries	Goals	Attendance	Notes
Tue 13 Feb	St George Illawarra Dragons	Glen Willow Oval	22 – 18	Kennar, Crichton, Jennings, Walker	Doueihi (3/5)	9,133	33rd Charity Shield
Sat 17 Feb	Wigan Warriors	ANZ Stadium	18 – 8	T. Burgess, Graham, Kennar, Douehi	Cook (1/4)	18,721	Played as Part of the 2018 World Club Challenge

== Regular season ==
Home games in bold

Date	Round	Opponent	Venue	Score	Tries	Goals	Attendance	Notes
Sat 10 Mar	1	New Zealand Warriors	Perth Stadium (Home game)	20 – 32	Walker (2), Kennar (2)	Reynolds (2/4)	38,824	
Sat 17 Mar	2	Penrith Panthers	Panthers Stadium	14 – 18	Walker, Cook	Doueihi (3/3)	15,995	
Sat 24 Mar	3	Manly-Warringah Sea Eagles	ANZ Stadium	34 – 6	Jennings (3), Kennar (2), Hunt, Johnston	Doueihi (3/7)	12,553	
Fri 30 Mar	4	Canterbury-Bankstown Bulldogs	ANZ Stadium	20 – 16	Burns, Hunt, Inglis, Murray	Doueihi (2/4)	32,471	
Fri 6 Apr	5	St. George Illawarra Dragons	Jubilee Oval	12 – 16	Inglis, Walker	Douheihi (1/2), Reynolds (1/1)	16,709	
Thur 12 Apr	6	Sydney Roosters	Allianz Stadium	26 – 14	Crichton, Inglis, Jennings, Sutton	Reynolds (5/7)	15,242	
Sat 21 Apr	7	Canberra Raiders	Central Coast Stadium	42 – 22	Jennings (2), Clark, Inglis, Johnston Kennar, Walker	Reynolds (7/9)	15,134	
Thur 26 Apr	8	Brisbane Broncos	ANZ Stadium	20 – 24	Johnston, Sutton, Walker	Reynolds (4/4)	11,123	ANZAC Round
Friday 4 May	9	Newcastle Knights	McDonald Jones Stadium	36 – 18	Jennings, Walker, Graham, Gagai, Cook, Inglis	Reynolds (6/8)	22,718	
Sun 13 May	10	St. George Illawarra Dragons	ANZ Stadium	24 – 10	Crichton, Graham, Hunt, Inglis	Reynolds (4/7)	13,062	Indigenous Round
Sat 19 May	11	North Queensland Cowboys	1300SMILES Stadium	20 – 19	G. Burgess, Cook	Reynolds (6/8)	14,270	
Sat 26 May	12	New Zealand Warriors	Mount Smart Stadium	30 – 10	G. Burgess, T. Burgess, Inglis, Jennings, Sutton	Reynolds (5/7)	15,958	
Fri 1 Jun	13	Cronulla Sharks	ANZ Stadium	22 – 14	T. Burgess (2), Graham	Reynolds (5/6)	10,410	
Fri 8 Jun	14	Gold Coast Titans	Cbus Super Stadium	18 – 16	Doueihi, Walker, Johnston	Reynolds (3/4)	11,833	
Thur 14 Jun	15	Parramatta Eels	ANZ Stadium (Away game)	42 – 24	Jennings (4), Johnston (2), Hunt, T. Burgess	Reynolds (5/9)	8,047	
Sun 1 Jul	16	North Queensland Cowboys	Barlow Park (Home game)	21 – 20	Reynolds, Walker, Graham, Jennings	Reynolds (3/6)	7,651	
	17	Bye						
Sat 14 Jul	18	Canterbury-Bankstown Bulldogs	ANZ Stadium (Away game)	24 – 6	Jennings (3), Reynolds	Reynolds (4/5)	14,278	
Sat 21 Jul	19	Wests Tigers	ANZ Stadium (Away game)	6 – 22	Walker	Reynolds (1/1)	25,963	
Sat 28 Jul	20	Parramatta Eels	ANZ Stadium	26 – 20	Gagai (2), Graham (2), Jennings	Reynolds (3/5)	15,542	
Fri 3 Aug	21	Melbourne Storm	ANZ Stadium	30 – 20	Hunt, S. Burgess, Doueihi, Cook, Johnston	Reynolds (5/6)	15,132	
Fri 10 Aug	22	Sydney Roosters	ANZ Stadium	14 – 18	Hunt, Reynolds	Reynolds (3/4)	26,331	Women's in League Round
Thur 16 Aug	23	Brisbane Broncos	Suncorp Stadium	18 – 38	Kennar (2), Hunt	Reynolds (3/4)	29,241	
Sat 25 Aug	24	Canberra Raiders	GIO Stadium	12 – 24	Inglis, Walker	Reynolds (2/3)	15,900	
Thur 30 Aug	25	Wests Tigers	ANZ Stadium	51 – 10	Jennings, Crichton, Walker, Graham, Reynolds, Johnston, T. Burgess, Sutton	Reynolds (9/10), Clark (1/1)	12,037	
Legend: Win Loss Draw Bye

== Finals ==
Date	Week	Opponent	Venue	Score	Tries	Goals	Attendance	Notes
Fri 7 Sep	1	Melbourne Storm	AAMI Park	28 – 29	Inglis (2), Gagai, Jennings, Murray	Reynolds (4/7)	17,306	
Sat 15 Sep	2	St. George Illawarra Dragons	ANZ Stadium	13 – 12	Reynolds	Reynolds (6/6)	48,188	Reynolds Scored 3 Field Goals to Win the Match.
Sat 22 Sep	3	Sydney Roosters	Allianz Stadium	4 – 12		Reynolds (2/3)	44,380	
Legend: Win Loss Draw Bye

== Representative Honor's ==
=== Domestic ===
Pos.	Player	Team	Call-up
HK	Damien Cook	New South Wales	2018 State of Origin
IC	Angus Crichton	New South Wales	2018 State of Origin
CE	Greg Inglis	Queensland	2018 State of Origin
WG	Dane Gagai	Queensland	2018 State of Origin

=== International ===
Pos.	Player	Team	Call-up
WG	Robert Jennings	Tonga	2018 Pacific Tests
IC	Tevita Tatola	Tonga	2018 Pacific Tests
SR	Sam Burgess	England	2018 Denver Test
PR & IC	Thomas Burgess	England	2018 Denver Test, England Tests and 2018 Baskerville Shield Game I, Game II and Game III
LK	George Burgess	England	England Tests and 2018 Baskerville Shield Game I & Game II
WG	Dane Gagai	Australia	Australian Tests
HK	Damien Cook	Australia	Australian Tests

== Individual Honor's ==
George Piggins Medal	Jack Rayner Players' Player Award	Bob McCarthy Clubman of the Year Award	John Sattler Rookie of the year Award	Roy Asotasi Members’ Choice Award	The Burrow Appreciation Award	Female Player of the Year	The Burrow Appreciation Award (Women's)	Women's Players' Player Award
Damien Cook	Sam Burgess	John Sutton	Adam Doueihi	Damien Cook	Damien Cook	Maddie Studdon	Chloe Caldwell & Grace Uluiburotu	Chloe Caldwell & Taleena Simon
