= 2018 Penrith Panthers season =

- NRL Rank: 5th
- 2018 record: Wins: 15; losses: 9
- Points scored: For: 410; against: 342

Team information
- CEO: Brian Fletcher
- Coach: Anthony Griffin (round 1 to round 21) Cameron Ciraldo (round 22 onwards)
- Captains: Peter Wallace (until retirement); James Maloney (officially round 15 onwards)
- Stadium: Panthers Stadium – 22,500; Carrington Park – 13,000 (round 9 only)
- Avg. attendance: 14,404
- High attendance: 21,565 vs Dragons, round 12

Top scorers
- Tries: Waqa Blake (13)
- Goals: James Maloney (53)
- Points: James Maloney (126)
← 2017	List of seasons	2019 →

The 2018 Penrith Panthers season was the 52nd in the club's history. Coached by Anthony Griffin (from round 1 to round 21) and Cameron Ciraldo (from round 22 onwards) on caretaker basis and captained by Peter Wallace and James Maloney, the Panthers competed in the National Rugby League's 2018 Telstra Premiership.

== Squad ==
Penrith Panthers
2018 NRL Squad		Extended squad	Coaching staff
Waqa Blake – CE, WG; Reagan Campbell-Gillard – PR; Nathan Cleary – HB; Christian Crichton – WG; Dylan Edwards – FB, WG; Wayde Egan – HK; Kaide Ellis – LK, SR; James Fisher-Harris – SR, LK, PR; Corey Harawira-Naera – SR; Jack Hetherington – PR; Sione Katoa – HK, LK; Viliame Kikau – PR, SR	Moses Leota – PR; Jarome Luai – FE; James Maloney (c) – HB, FE; Josh Mansour – WG; Sam McKendry – PR; Trent Merrin – LK, PR; Tyrone Peachey – LK, SR, FE, CE; Tyrone Phillips – WG, FB; James Tamou – PR; Dallin Watene-Zelezniak – WG, FB; Dean Whare – CE, FB, WG; Isaah Yeo (vc) – SR, CE	Tyrone May – FE, LK; Andy Saunders – PR; Siosifa Talakai – CE, SR; Jayden Walker – SR	Head coach: Cameron Ciraldo (Caretaker); Assistant coaches: Peter Wallace; Guy Missio (ISP coach); Ben Harden (JF coach); Tony Guilfoyle (Head of Performance); Legend: (c) Captain(s); (vc) Vice-captain(s); Updated: 16 July 2018; Source(s):

=== Player transfers ===
A † denotes that the transfer occurred during the 2018 season.

Gains
Player	Signed from	Until end of	Notes
Adam Keighran	Canterbury-Bankstown Bulldogs	2018	
James Maloney	Cronulla-Sutherland Sharks	2020	
Tyrone Phillips	Canterbury-Bankstown Bulldogs	2018	
Jayden Walker	Cronulla-Sutherland Sharks	2018	
Andy Saunders†	Wentworthville Magpies (NSW Cup)		
Siosifa Talakai†	South Sydney Rabbitohs		

Losses
Player	Signed To	Until end of	Notes
Sitaleki Akauola	Warrington Wolves (Super League)	2019	
Tim Browne†	Retirement	–	
Bryce Cartwright	Gold Coast Titans	2021	
Mason Cerruto	Canterbury-Bankstown Bulldogs	2018	
Tom Eisenhuth†	Melbourne Storm		
Leilani Latu	Gold Coast Titans	2020	
Matt Moylan	Cronulla-Sutherland Sharks	2021	
Darren Nicholls	St. George Illawarra Dragons	2019	
Mitch Rein	Gold Coast Titans	2018	
Tony Satini†	Mount Pritchard Mounties (NSW Cup)		
Lachlan Stein†	Newtown Jets (NSW Cup)		
Peter Wallace†	Retirement	–	

== Fixtures ==
=== Pre-season ===
Date	Trial	Opponent	Venue	Score	Tries	Goals
Saturday, 17 February	1	Sydney Roosters	Panthers Stadium	30 – 18	Sivo (2), Eisenhuth, Egan, Leota, Peachey	Cleary (2/4), Keighran (1/2)
Saturday, 24 February	2	Canterbury-Bankstown Bulldogs	Belmore Sports Ground	24 – 10	Campbell-Gillard, Crichton	Cleary (1/2)
Legend: Win Loss Draw

=== Regular season ===
Date	Round	Opponent	Venue	Score	Tries	Goals	Attendance
Sunday, 11 March	1	Parramatta Eels	Panthers Stadium	24 – 14	Blake (2), Kikau	Cleary (6/6)	21,506
Saturday, 17 March	2	South Sydney Rabbitohs	Panthers Stadium	18 – 14	Blake, Merrin, Peachey	Cleary (3/4)	15,995
Friday, 23 March	3	Canterbury-Bankstown Bulldogs	ANZ Stadium	18 – 20	Edwards, Maloney, Mansour	Cleary (2/2), Maloney (1/1)	11,247
Thursday, 29 March	4	North Queensland Cowboys	1300SMILES Stadium	33 – 14	Blake, Kikau, Leota, Maloney	Maloney (8/8, 1 FG)	11,907
Sunday, 8 April	5	Parramatta Eels	ANZ Stadium	6 – 12	Mansour	Maloney (4/4)	10,061
Sunday, 15 April	6	Gold Coast Titans	Panthers Stadium	35 – 12	Harawira-Naera (2), Crichton, Edwards, Peachey, Tamou	Maloney (5/7, 1 FG)	11,091
Sunday, 22 April	7	Cronulla-Sutherland Sharks	Southern Cross Group Stadium	26 – 22	Edwards, Kikau, Watene-Zelezniak, Yeo	Maloney (3/4)	12,667
Friday, 27 April	8	Canterbury-Bankstown Bulldogs	Panthers Stadium	22 – 14	Harawira-Naera, Leota, Yeo	Maloney (5/6)	13,760
Friday, 4 May	9	North Queensland Cowboys	Carrington Park	20 – 26	Phillips (2), Wallace (2)	Maloney (2/4)	10,289
Friday, 11 May	10	Newcastle Knights	McDonald Jones Stadium	18 – 29	Campbell-Gillard, Harawira-Naera, Peachey, Watene-Zelezniak	Maloney (6/6, 1 FG)	14,801
Thursday, 17 May	11	Wests Tigers	Panthers Stadium	16 – 2	Peachey, Phillips	Maloney (4/5)	15,081
Saturday, 26 May	12	St. George Illawarra Dragons	Panthers Stadium	28 – 2	Campbell-Gillard, Cleary, Crichton, Kikau	Maloney (6/6)	21,565
	13	Bye					
Friday, 8 June	14	Canberra Raiders	GIO Stadium	22 – 23	Peachey (2), Whare	Maloney (5/6), Cleary (1 FG)	7,662
Friday, 15 June	15	Sydney Roosters	Allianz Stadium	32 – 6	Whare	Maloney (1/1)	10,078
Saturday, 30 June	16	Manly Warringah Sea Eagles	Panthers Stadium	10 – 18	Watene-Zelezniak	Maloney (3/3)	12,755
Friday, 6 July	17	New Zealand Warriors	Panthers Stadium	36 – 4	Luai (2), Blake, Harawira-Naera, Kikau, Phillips	Luai (6/8)	10,255
Friday, 13 July	18	Cronulla-Sutherland Sharks	Panthers Stadium	12 – 24	Blake, Harawira-Naera	Luai (2/3)	11,742
Friday, 20 July	19	Brisbane Broncos	Suncorp Stadium	50 – 18	Blake, Mansour, Peachey	Cleary (3/3)	26,357
Saturday, 28 July	20	Manly Warringah Sea Eagles	Lottoland	24 – 28	Blake, Cleary, Mansour, Whare, Yeo	Cleary (4/5)	6,134
Sunday, 5 August	21	Canberra Raiders	Panthers Stadium	40 – 31	Tamou, Peachey (2), Whare, Watene-Zelezniak, Mansour, Maloney	Cleary (6/7)	12,195
Saturday, 11 August	22	Gold Coast Titans	Cbus Super Stadium	16 – 17	Blake, Cleary, Watene-Zelezniak	Cleary (6/7, 1 FG)	11,283
Saturday, 18 August	23	Newcastle Knights	Panthers Stadium	12 – 20	May, Egan	Cleary (2/2)	14,125
Friday, 24 August	24	New Zealand Warriors	Mount Smart Stadium	16 – 36	Blake, Mansour, Merrin	Cleary (2/3)	17,195
Friday, 31 August	25	Melbourne Storm	AAMI Park	16 – 22	Mansour (2), Blake (2), Crichton	Cleary (1/6)	20,637
Legend: Win Loss Draw Bye

=== Finals ===
Qualifying and elimination finals
8 Sep, Sydney Football Stadium
1	Sydney	21
4	Cronulla-Sutherland	12
8 Sep, Stadium Australia
5	Penrith	27
8	New Zealand	12
9 Sep, Lang Park
6	Brisbane	18
7	St George Illawarra	48
7 Sep, Melbourne Rectangular Stadium
2	Melbourne	29
3	South Sydney	28

Semi-finals
14 Sep, Sydney Football Stadium
Cronulla-Sutherland	21
Penrith	20
15 Sep, Stadium Australia
South Sydney	13
St George Illawarra	12

Preliminary finals
22 Sep, Sydney Football Stadium
Sydney	12
South Sydney	4
21 Sep, Melbourne Rectangular Stadium
Melbourne	22
Cronulla-Sutherland	6

Grand final
30 Sep, Stadium Australia
Sydney	21
Melbourne	6

Date	Round	Opponent	Venue	Score	Tries	Goals	Attendance
Saturday, 8 September	Elimination Final	New Zealand Warriors	ANZ Stadium	27 – 12	Peachey (2), Maloney, Crichton	Cleary (5/6) Maloney (1FG)	17,168
Friday, 15 September	Semi Final	Cronulla Sharks	Allianz Stadium	21 - 20	Cleary, Yeo, Blake	Cleary (4/4)	19,211
Legend: Win Loss Draw Bye

== Ladder ==
Pos	Team	Pld	W	D	L	B	PF	PA	PD	Pts	
1	Sydney Roosters (M, P)	24	16	0	8	1	542	361	+181	34	Advance to finals series
2	Melbourne Storm	24	16	0	8	1	536	363	+173	34	Advance to finals series
3	South Sydney Rabbitohs	24	16	0	8	1	582	437	+145	34	Advance to finals series
4	Cronulla-Sutherland Sharks	24	16	0	8	1	519	423	+96	34	Advance to finals series
5	Penrith Panthers	24	15	0	9	1	517	461	+56	32	Advance to finals series
6	Brisbane Broncos	24	15	0	9	1	556	500	+56	32	Advance to finals series
7	St. George Illawarra Dragons	24	15	0	9	1	519	472	+47	32	Advance to finals series
8	New Zealand Warriors	24	15	0	9	1	472	447	+25	32	Advance to finals series
9	Wests Tigers	24	12	0	12	1	377	460	−83	26	
10	Canberra Raiders	24	10	0	14	1	563	540	+23	22	
11	Newcastle Knights	24	9	0	15	1	414	607	−193	20	
12	Canterbury-Bankstown Bulldogs	24	8	0	16	1	428	474	−46	18	
13	North Queensland Cowboys	24	8	0	16	1	449	521	−72	18	
14	Gold Coast Titans	24	8	0	16	1	472	582	−110	18	
15	Manly-Warringah Sea Eagles	24	7	0	17	1	500	622	−122	16	
16	Parramatta Eels (W)	24	6	0	18	1	374	550	−176	14	

Updated to match(es) played on 2 September 2018. Source: 2018 NRL Ladder
(M) Minor premiers; (P) Premiers; (W) Wooden spoon

== Statistics ==
Name	Age	App	T	G	FG	Pts
Caleb Aekins	21	1	0	0	0	0
Waqa Blake	24	9	8	0	0	32
Reagan Campbell-Gillard	25	14	2	0	0	8
Nathan Cleary	21	10	2	18/20	1	45
Christian Crichton	22	16	2	0	0	8
Dylan Edwards	22	8	3	0	0	12
Wayde Egan	21	9	0	0	0	0
Kaide Ellis	22	5	0	0	0	0
James Fisher-Harris	22	19	0	0	0	0
Corey Harawira-Naera	23	18	6	0	0	24
Jack Hetherington	22	11	0	0	0	0
Sione Katoa	23	14	0	0	0	0
Viliame Kikau	23	18	5	0	0	20
Moses Leota	23	13	2	0	0	8
Jarome Luai	21	4	2	8/11	0	24
Sam McKendry	29	2	0	0	0	0
James Maloney	32	17	2	53/61	3	117
Josh Mansour	28	8	4	0	0	16
Tyrone May	22	3	0	0	0	0
Trent Merrin	29	18	1	0	0	4
Tyrone Peachey	27	17	7	0	0	28
Tyrone Phillips	24	9	4	0	0	16
James Tamou	30	19	1	0	0	4
Peter Wallace	33	9	2	0	0	8
Dallin Watene-Zelezniak	23	13	3	0	0	12
Dean Whare	28	18	3	0	0	12
Isaah Yeo	24	19	3	0	0	12
27 players	25.54	19	62	79/92	4	410

== Other teams ==
In addition to competing in the National Rugby League, the Panthers are also fielding semi-professional teams in the 2018 Jersey Flegg Cup (for players aged under 20) and the New South Wales Rugby League's 2018 Intrust Super Premiership (NSW Cup). The JF team is coached by Ben Harden, and the NSW Cup team is coached by Guy Missio.

== Representative honours ==
=== Domestic ===
Pos.	Player	Team	Call-up	Ref.
PR	Reagan Campbell-Gillard	New South Wales	2018 State of Origin	
HB	Nathan Cleary	New South Wales	2018 State of Origin	
FE	James Maloney	New South Wales	2018 State of Origin	
BE	Tyrone Peachey	New South Wales	2018 State of Origin	

=== International ===
Pos.	Player	Team	Call-up	Ref.
CE	Tyrone Phillips	Fiji	2018 Test vs Papua New Guinea	
WG	Christian Crichton	Samoa	2018 Test vs Tonga	
FE	Tyrone May	Samoa	2018 Test vs Tonga	
BE	Sione Katoa	Tonga	2018 Test vs Samoa	
BE	James Fisher-Harris	New Zealand	2018 Test vs England	
FB	Dallin Watene-Zelezniak	New Zealand	2018 Test vs England	
