= The Burrow (supporters' group) =

- Nickname: The Burrow
- Type: Supporters' group
- Team: South Sydney Rabbitohs

The Burrow is an organisation linked to South Sydney Rabbitohs Rugby League Football Club, based in Redfern, a suburb of inner-southern Sydney, New South Wales.

The South Sydney Rabbitohs continue to have a large supporter base in their traditional areas of south-eastern Sydney, despite having moved from Redfern Oval two decades ago. They also enjoy wide support throughout other rugby league playing centres around the country. The official South Sydney supporter group is known as "The Burrow" while the active supporter group is known as "Gate38" which is made up of young men who were involved in the "scumgate" scandal in 2013. The Rabbitohs also have a large supporter base in Perth

The Rabbitohs have the highest football club membership in the National Rugby League, with total membership exceeding 35,000 on 23 June 2015. The total member number also includes more than 11,000 ticketed members to date, the highest of the Sydney-based NRL Clubs. It was announced during the 2010 Charity Shield game that both St George Illawarra and Souths had exceeded the 10,000 milestone, making the 2010 season the first time that two Sydney clubs had entered the season with 10,000 ticketed members each. The club has members from every state in Australia and international members located in 22 countries. Football club membership had peaked at some 22,000 when the club was readmitted to the National Rugby League for 2002 season.

"Group 14", a collection of the club's backers which comprises an influential collection of businessmen, politicians and media personalities, was formed before the Rabbitohs' exclusion from the NRL in 1999. Members included Andrew Denton, Anthony Albanese, Deirdre Grusovin, Mike Whitney, Laurie Brereton, Mikey Robins, Ron Hoenig, Nick Greiner, Ray Martin, Cathy Freeman, Candice Warner and the former New South Wales premier, Kristina Keneally. They contributed to South Sydney's bid for reinstatement, following the club's exclusion from the competition at the end of the 1999 season. A sustained campaign of public support that year, unprecedented in Australian sporting history, saw 40,000 people attending a rally in the Sydney central business district in support of South Sydney's cause. In 2000 and 2001, public street marches took place in Sydney with more than 80,000 people rallying behind the Rabbitohs. The club also has a number of high-profile supporters, many of whom were dominant figures in their battle to be readmitted into the premiership in 2000 and 2001. In 2007, supporters set a new club record for attendance with an average home crowd figure of 15,702 being the highest ever since the introduction of the home and away system in 1974.

== The Burrow Appreciation Award ==
=== Men's ===
Season	Winner	Ref
2006	Nathan Merritt	
2007	Paul Mellor	
2008	Luke Stuart	
2009	Nathan Merritt	
2010	Chris Sandow	
2011	Michael Crocker	
2012	Adam Reynolds	
2013	Issac Luke	
2014	Sam Burgess	
2015	Jason Clark	
2016	Kyle Turner	
2017	Angus Crichton	
2018	Damien Cook	
2019	John Sutton	
2020	Thomas Burgess	
2021	Cody Walker	
2022	Alex Johnston	
2023	Campbell Graham	
2024	Jai Arrow	

=== Women's ===
Season	Winner	Ref
2018	Chloe Caldwell & Grace Uluiburotu	
