= Elijah Taylor (rugby league) =

New Zealand international rugby league footballer

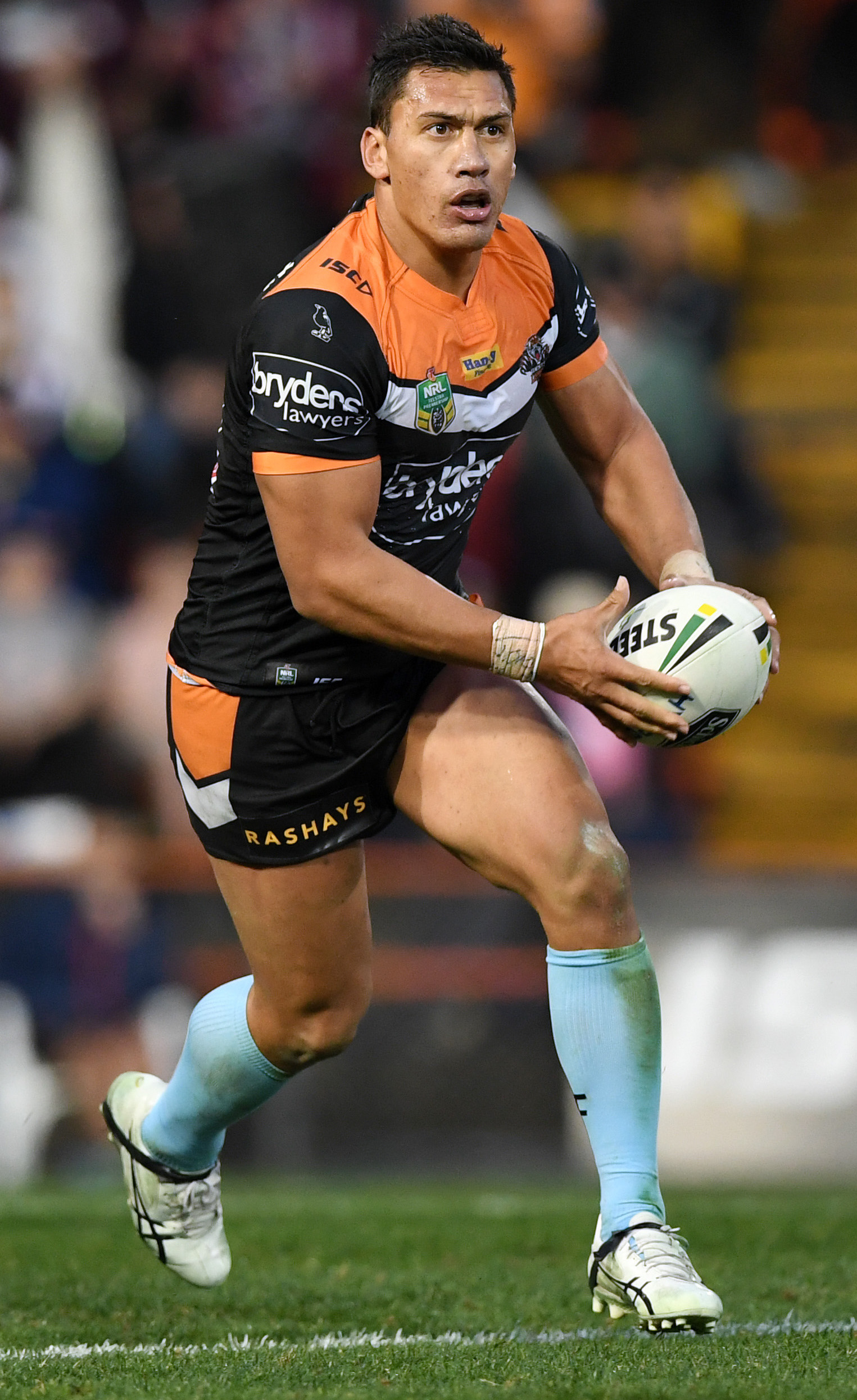

Personal information
- Born: 27 February 1990 (age 36) Hāwera, Taranaki, New Zealand
- Height: 6 ft 0 in (1.84 m)
- Weight: 15 st 13 lb (101 kg)

Playing information
- Position: Loose forward, Second-row, Hooker
Club
Years	Team	Pld	T	G	FG	P
2011–13	New Zealand Warriors	67	14	0	0	56
2014–16	Penrith Panthers	39	3	0	0	12
2016–20	Wests Tigers	80	8	0	0	32
2021–22	Salford Red Devils	41	1	0	0	4
2023	Featherstone Rovers	19	4	0	0	16
2024–25	Oldham	33	0	0	0	0
	Total	279	30	0	0	120
Representative
Years	Team	Pld	T	G	FG	P
2011–17	New Zealand	11	2	0	0	8
2016	NSW Residents	1	0	0	0	0
- Source: As of 16 December 2025

Elijah Taylor (born 27 February 1990) is a New Zealand professional rugby league footballer who plays as a loose forward, second-row or hooker for Campbelltown City Kangaroos in the Macarthur Rugby League and who has represented New Zealand at international level.

He previously played for the New Zealand Warriors, Penrith Panthers and the Wests Tigers in the NRL.

== Background ==
Taylor was born in Hāwera, New Zealand, and is of Māori Descent.

He played rugby union as a youngster, playing for the Patea Rugby Club and representing age group teams in Taranaki, Northland and Auckland, before taking up rugby league in 2006 while studying at St. Paul's College. Taylor also attended Patea High School and Kaitaia College before moving to Auckland.

== Playing career ==
=== Early career ===
In 2007, while at St Paul's, Taylor was selected for the New Zealand Māori under-18s side.

Taylor was signed by the New Zealand Warriors on a development contract, where he played for the Otahuhu Leopards club in Auckland Rugby League competitions and the Tamaki Titans in the Bartercard Cup. With the creation of the Toyota Cup (Under-20s) in 2008, Taylor joined the Warriors Under-20s team and in 2009 became team captain. Taylor missed only one of the team's first 46 matches.

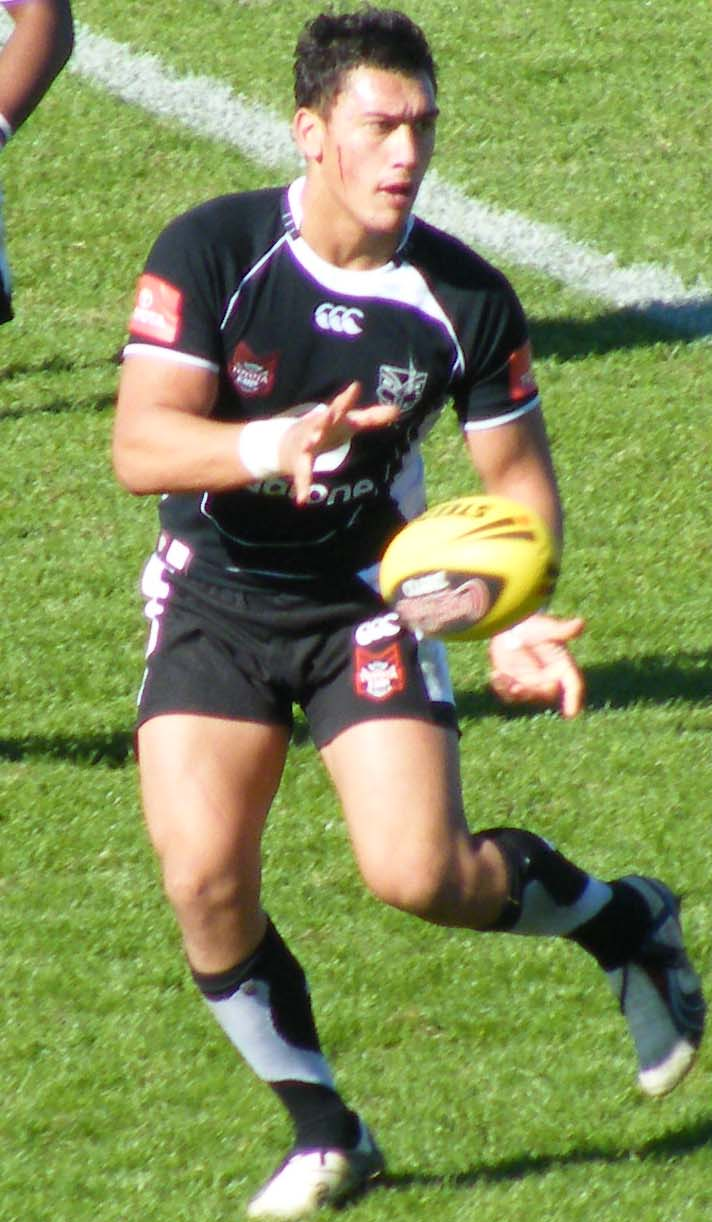
Taylor playing for the Warriors under 20s side in 2009

In August 2009, Taylor was to become the eighth player to make his first grade debut from the under-20 side when he was named to play against the Gold Coast Titans in Round 22, but had to withdraw from the game due to a hamstring injury. On 3 October 2010, Taylor captained the Warriors under-20s team in the 2010 Toyota Cup Grand Final against the South Sydney Rabbitohs, where he started at second-row and scored 2 tries in the 42–26 win. Taylor finished his Toyota Cup career with 52 matches and 14 tries.

=== 2011 ===
In Round 4, Taylor made his long-awaited NRL debut for the Warriors against the Cronulla-Sutherland Sharks, playing off the interchange bench in the 26–18 win at Owen Delany Park in Taupō. In Round 6 against the Manly-Warringah Sea Eagles, Taylor scored his first NRL try in the Warriors 20–10 loss at Brookvale Oval. On 2 October 2011, Taylor played for the Warriors in their 2011 NRL Grand Final against the Manly-Warringah Sea Eagles, starting at second-row and scoring a try in the Warriors 24–10 loss at ANZ Stadium. Taylor finished his debut year with 4 tries from 21 matches. Selected for the New Zealand national rugby league team Four Nations squad, he made his international debut on 5 November against Wales, playing off the interchange bench in the 36–0 win at Wembley Stadium. Taylor played in 2 matches for the Kiwis in the tournament.

=== 2012 ===
Taylor finished the 2012 NRL season with 23 matches and 2 tries for the Warriors. On 13 October, he played for New Zealand against Australia in the trans-Tasman test.

=== 2013 ===
On 7 March, Taylor announced that he signed a 4-year deal with the Penrith Panthers, starting from 2014, joining former Warriors' coach Ivan Cleary. Penrith Manager Phil Gould said he had, "been specifically targeted by the club, not only for his elite footballing talent, but also based on his tremendous character and leadership qualities."

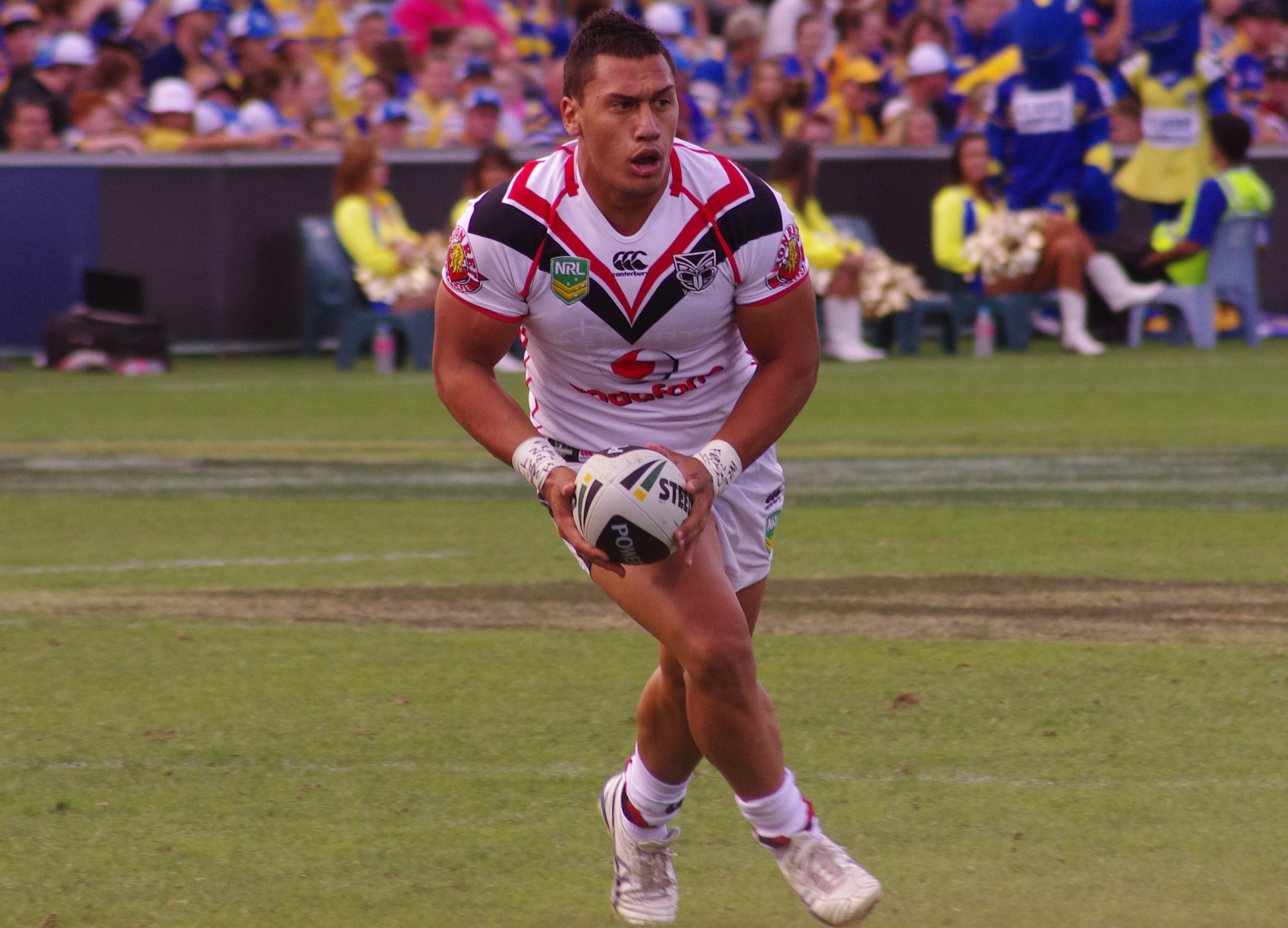
Taylor playing for the New Zealand Warriors in 2013

On 19 April, he played in the 2013 Anzac Test, playing off the interchange bench in the 32–12 loss. Taylor finished his last year with the Warriors with 8 tries from 23 matches.

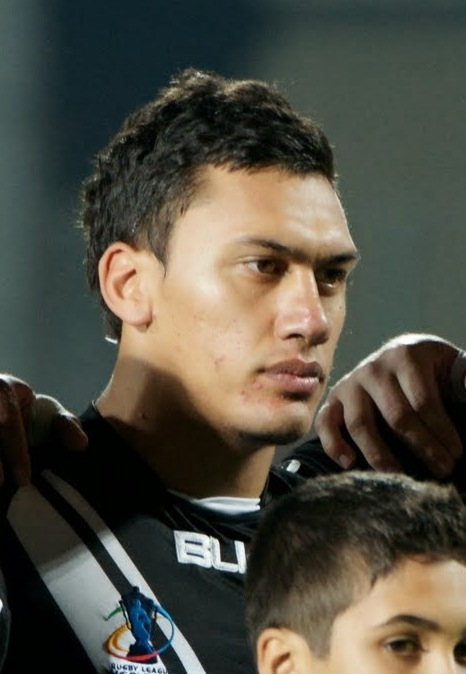
Taylor during 2013 World Cup

At the end of the year, he was selected in the New Zealand 2013 Rugby League World Cup squad, scoring his first international try in the 56–10 victory over Papua New Guinea at Headingley Stadium. On 30 November, Taylor started at lock in the 34–2 loss to Australia in the World Cup Final. He played in all six of the Kiwis World Cup matches.

=== 2014 ===
In Round 1, Taylor made his club debut for the Penrith Panthers against the Newcastle Knights, where he started at second-row and scored a try in the Panthers 30–8 win at Penrith Stadium. Taylor missed the 2014 Anzac Test through injury. In Round 21, he suffered a season ending anterior cruciate ligament (ACL) knee injury, limiting him to 17 matches for the season.

=== 2015 ===
Taylor missed the 2015 Anzac Test due to injury.

In round 5 against the North Queensland Cowboys Taylor set the record for most tackles in a nrl game making 77 tackles.

Midway through the season, he was averaging over 50 tackles a game, but was still mentally troubled by his knee reconstruction. "The lack of confidence in my knee goes to my head and sometimes it doesn't feel as strong as it should. I have thoughts of doing it again and the thought of six months of rehab again is scary, they're bad thoughts, and I won't lie they are always there in the back of my mind," he said.

In Round 20 against the Canberra Raiders, Taylor played his 100th career match and also scored a try in the Panthers 34–24 loss at Penrith Stadium. In Round 24 against the St George Illawarra Dragons, Taylor's season was ended due to a hand injury. Taylor finished the 2015 NRL season with 20 matches and a try. On 8 September, he was named in the New Zealand train-on squad for the end of year tour of Great Britain, but didn't make the final squad.

=== 2016 ===
Considered a potential captain for Panthers in 2016, Taylor was dropped to the NSW Cup team by new coach Anthony Griffin in favour of rookie James Fisher-Harris. On 2 May, Taylor joined the Wests Tigers effective immediately, after being released from his Panthers contract. Taylor played in 2 matches for the Panthers in 2016 before the shift to the Tigers. Taylor said, "They wanted me to be more aggressive in defence. That's what I was working on. I'm not the one to go out and put on a big shot or whack someone in a tackle. My strength is to consistently be there, wrestle and lead the line speed. But I realised I wasn't going to play first grade even though I thought I had done everything that was asked of me. I was a bit frustrated, but I'm not a person to get angry. I just wanted to play first grade again, so that's why I'm at the Tigers."

In Round 10, Taylor made his club debut for the Wests Tigers against Canterbury-Bankstown, starting at second-row in the 36–4 loss at ANZ Stadium. In his next game, he was named Man of the Match. With part of the game spent playing hooker after an injury to Matt Ballin, He made 50 tackles and set up 2 tries. Captain Aaron Woods said, "He's been really good for our defensive line as well. Just the amount of talk he brings. He's a player I'm really glad we picked him up." In the next game against the Brisbane Broncos, Taylor scored his first try for the Wests Tigers in the 19–18 victory and was named the Man of the Match for the second week in a row.

On 21 November, Taylor re-signed with the Wests Tigers on a one-year deal with a second year option in his favour, that would see him at the club until 2018.

=== 2017 ===
Taking the responsibility of vice-captain, Taylor was a regular in first grade in 2017, with 5 tries from 21 games. He played most of the season at lock, before swapping with Matt Eisenhuth to play in second row later in the year. With 891 tackles, Taylor's was the club's leader and 5th best in the NRL. He was awarded the Kelly-Barnes Medal for the Wests Tigers player of the year.

At season's end, Taylor renewed his contract to remain at the club to the end of 2020. He said, "Ivan coming in as head coach was a big factor in me deciding to stay. He's an experienced coach and has coached me at both the Warriors and Penrith, he's the reason I moved to Australia, knowing what kind of coach he is, what his principles are and the way he likes to play football was probably the biggest factor."

=== 2018 ===
After the departure of Aaron Woods, Taylor was named as one of 5 co-captains at Wests Tigers, alongside Benji Marshall, Chris Lawrence, Russell Packer and Josh Reynolds. Coach Ivan Cleary said, "I just think it's the right model for us right now. When we started this preseason it was pretty obvious straight away that there was no real pecking order. There was no set culture to adhere to. It was all new."

=== 2020 ===
On 28 September 2020, Taylor was one of eight players who were released by the Wests Tigers.

On 28 December 2020, Taylor signed for English Super League team Salford on a two-year deal, he linked up with former team mates Tui Lolohea, Krisnan Inu & Sebastine Ikahihifo.

=== 2021 & 2022 ===
In the 2021 Super League season, Taylor made 14 appearances for Salford as the club finished 11th on the table. The following season, Taylor played 27 games for the club including their 19-12 semi-final loss against St Helens. Taylor then signed a contract to leave Salford with the player joining RFL Championship side Featherstone ahead of the 2023 season.

=== 2023 ===
On 3 November 2023, it was reported that he will join Oldham RLFC for the 2024 season on a two-year deal.

=== 2025 ===
On 24 September 2025 it was confirmed that he would leave Oldham RLFC at the end of the 2025 season

== Personal life ==
Taylor runs a social media page titled "Footy Hacks" where he talks about his playing career and fitness. The page has caused some controversy where in one video Taylor claimed that there was widespread drug use in the Super League. He also urged Roger Tuivasa-Sheck not to play in the competition. In a previous video, Taylor attacked Brisbane coach Michael Maguire. Former Brisbane player Martin Taupau was terminated by Brisbane for liking the video that Taylor had posted.
