= Josh Reynolds (rugby league) =

Australian rugby league footballer

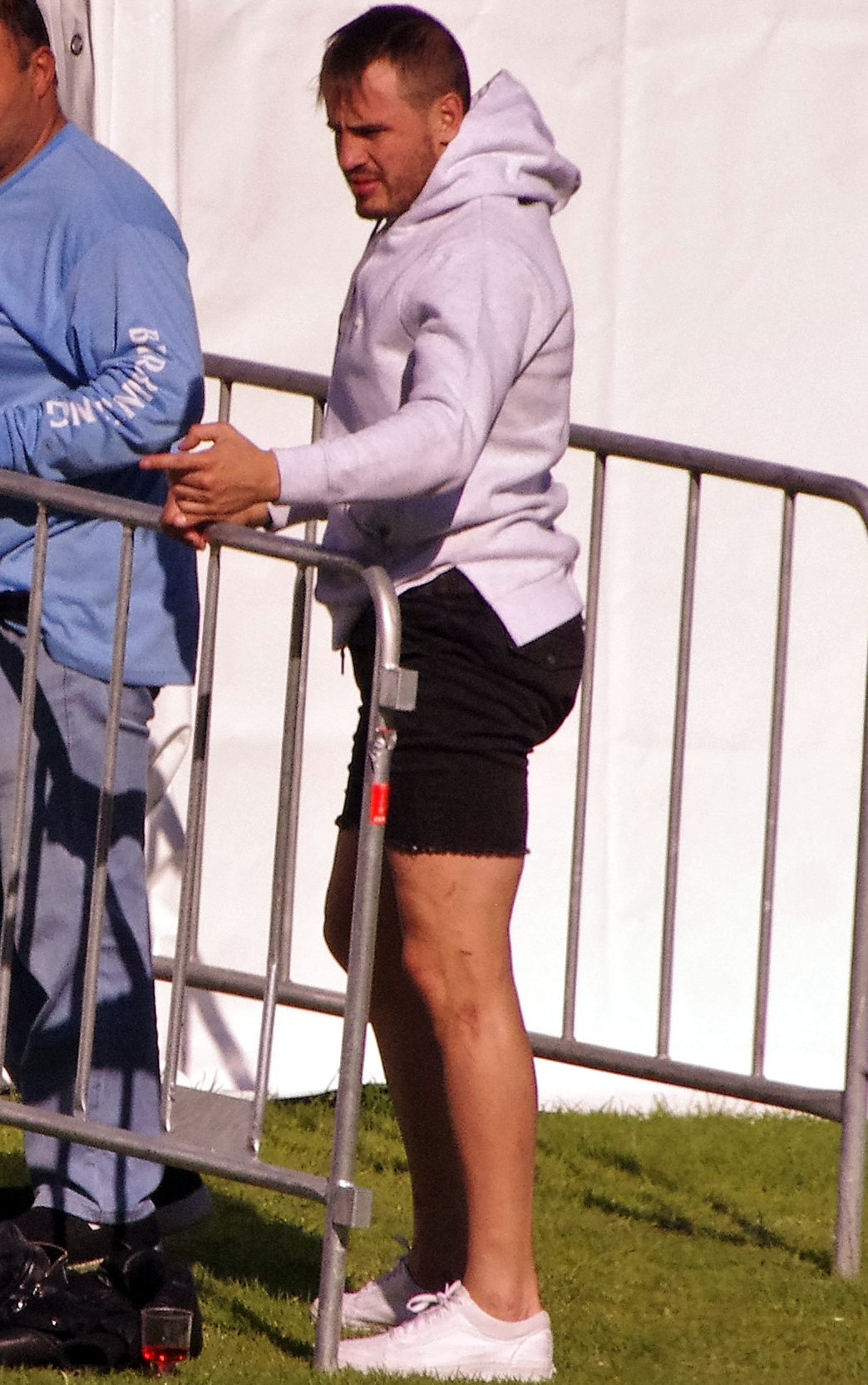

Personal information
- Full name: Joshua Reynolds
- Born: 13 April 1989 (age 37) Sydney, New South Wales, Australia

Playing information
- Height: 182 cm (6 ft 0 in)
- Weight: 89 kg (14 st 0 lb)
- Position: Five-eighth, Hooker
Club
Years	Team	Pld	T	G	FG	P
2011–17	Canterbury Bulldogs	138	41	0	5	169
2018–20	Wests Tigers	22	3	0	0	12
2021–22	Hull F.C.	25	7	0	0	28
2023	Canterbury Bulldogs	7	0	0	0	0
	Total	192	51	0	5	209
Representative
Years	Team	Pld	T	G	FG	P
2013–14	New South Wales	4	0	0	0	0
2013	Prime Minister's XIII	1	0	0	0	0
2014–15	City NSW	2	1	0	0	4

Joshua Reynolds (born 13 April 1989) is a former Australian professional rugby league footballer who played as a five-eighth for Canterbury-Bankstown Bulldogs in the National Rugby League.

He previously played for the Wests Tigers in the National Rugby League, and Hull F.C. in the English Super League. He has represented New South Wales in the State of Origin series, Prime Minister's XIII and City Origin.

== Background ==
Reynolds was born in Sydney, New South Wales, Australia on 13 April 1989. He attended Clemton Park Public School and Marist College Kogarah.

== Playing career ==
Reynolds played for the St. George Dragons in the Harold Matthews Cup and then the Canterbury team in the SG Ball competition before progressing to the Toyota Cup in 2008. In 2008 and 2009, Reynolds played for Canterbury in the under 20s before moving onto the ranks of the New South Wales Cup. Reynolds was named Canterbury's 2010 NSW Cup player of the year as well as scoring two tries and kicking four goals, for a personal haul of 16 points, in their 24-12 grand final win over the Windsor Wolves.

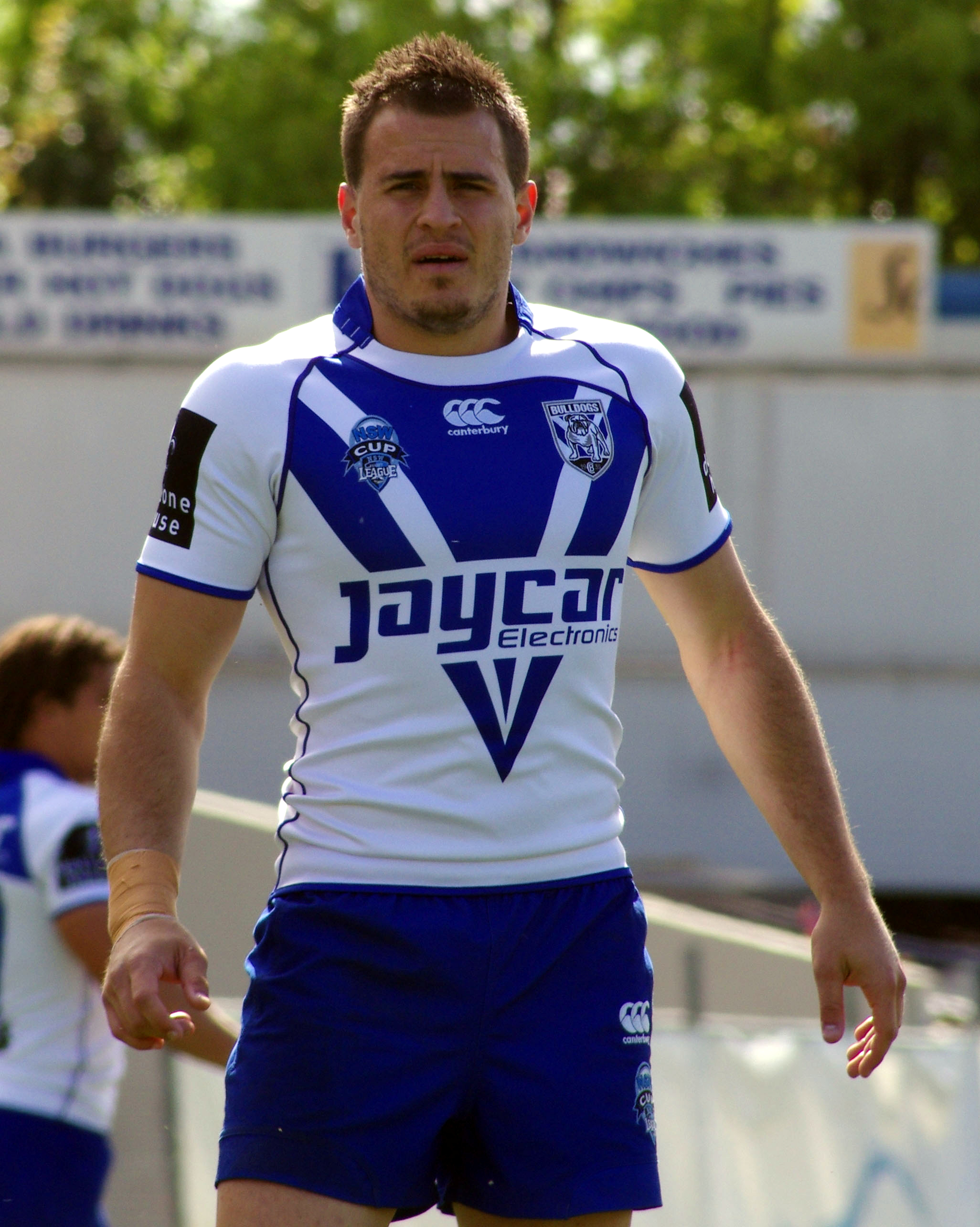
Reynolds playing for the Bulldogs in 2011

=== 2011 ===
In round 11, Reynolds made his NRL debut for the Canterbury-Bankstown Bulldogs, playing against the Canberra Raiders at hooker in the 20–12 loss at Canberra Stadium. In round 15, against the Cronulla-Sutherland Sharks, he scored his first NRL try in Canterbury's 26–10 win at ANZ Stadium. Reynolds finished his debut year in the NRL with four tries from ten matches.

=== 2012 ===
On 30 September, in the 2012 NRL Grand Final against the Melbourne Storm, Reynolds played at five-eighth in Canterbury’s 14–4 loss. He finished his impressive season having played in all of Canterbury's 27 matches and scoring 10 tries, which was the first time since Terry Lamb that a Canterbury five-eighth had scored more than 10 tries in a season.

=== 2013 ===
For game 1 of the 2013 State of Origin series, Reynolds was selected to fill in for the injured Kurt Gidley on the interchange bench but did not get a run on the field. He retained his bench spot for game 2, making his official New South Wales debut in the 26–6 loss at Suncorp Stadium. Reynolds wasn't chosen for game 3. Reynolds finished the 2013 NRL season with him playing in 23 matches and scoring 9 tries for Canterbury.

On 29 September, Reynolds played for the Prime Minister's XIII off the interchange bench in the 50–10 win over Papua New Guinea in Kokopo, Papua New Guinea.

=== 2014 ===
Reynolds was selected to play for NSW City in the City vs Country Origin match playing at five-eighth, and scored a try in the 26-all draw in Dubbo. Reynolds was chosen as New South Wales five-eighth alongside Bulldogs halves partner Trent Hodkinson for all three games of the 2014 State of Origin series, during which the Blues ended Queensland's 8-series winning streak. On 5 October 2014, in the 2014 NRL Grand Final against the South Sydney Rabbitohs, Reynolds played at five-eighth in Canterbury’s 30–6 loss. Reynolds finished the year with 19 matches and 2 tries for the Canterbury club.

=== 2015 ===
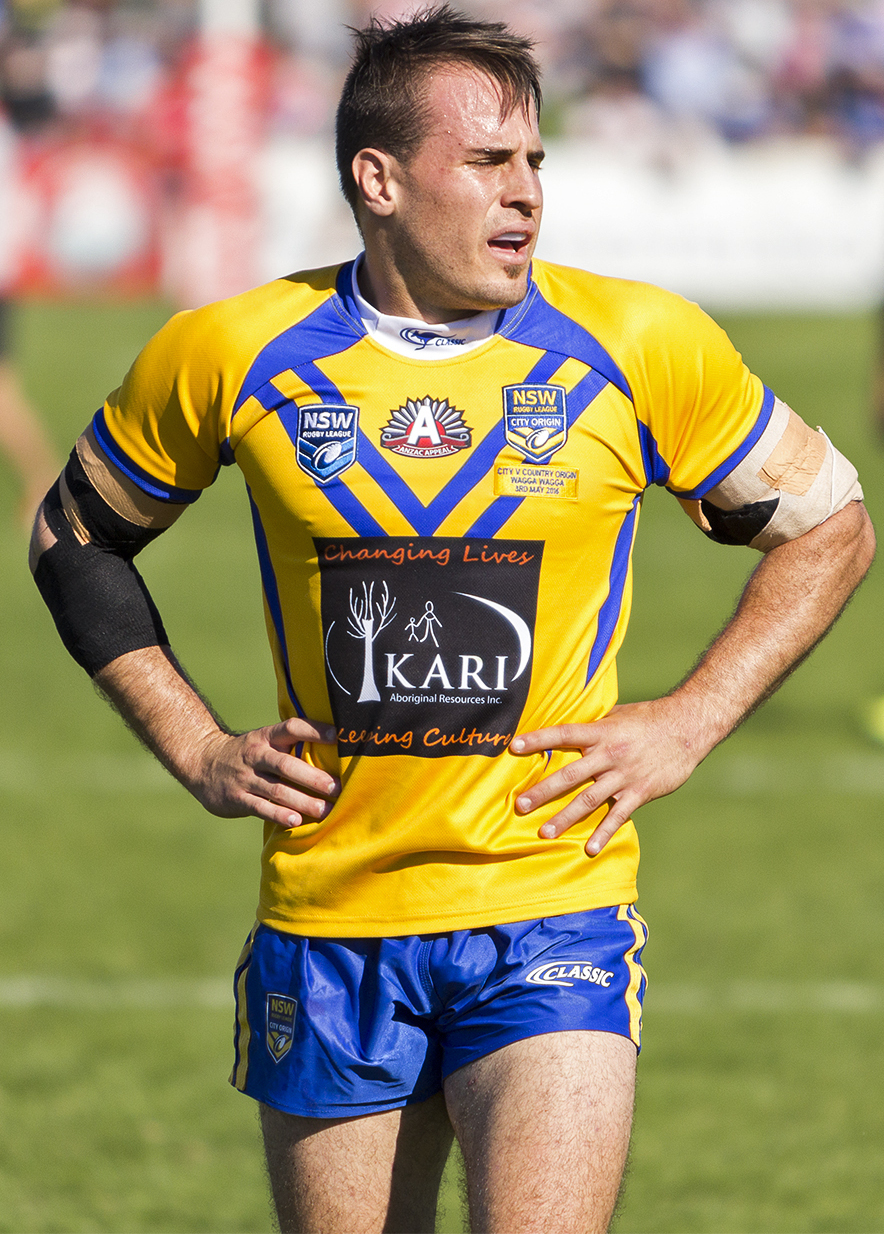
Reynolds playing for the City NSW team in 2015

Reynolds was selected for the City Origin team at five-eighth as an audition for the vacant five-eighth position for New South Wales. He was penalised and placed on report twice in the second half, one for an attempted trip on Country forward Tariq Sims as he scored a try in the 52nd minute, and in the 77th minute for a shoulder charge on fullback David Mead. He was suspended for one week, and not selected for the Blues team. In the week 1 Elimination Final match against the St George Illawarra Dragons, Reynolds kicked a field goal to win the match for Canterbury 11–10 in golden point extra time. He finished the season with 17 matches, scoring three tries and kicking two field goals.

=== 2016 ===
In round 4, against the South Sydney Rabbitohs, Reynolds played his 100th NRL career match in Canterbury's 42–12 win at ANZ Stadium. In round 8, against the Gold Coast Titans, he kicked a field goal in golden point extra time to win the match for the Canterbury club 21–20. Reynolds finished the season with 8 tries and 2 field goals from 25 matches.

=== 2017 ===
In February, Reynolds was captain of Canterbury's 2017 Auckland Nines squad. On 26 April, after weeks of speculation where Reynolds would go after the season's end, he signed a four-year contract with the Wests Tigers. The value was believed to be around $3 million over four years. It was quoted in many articles that he "felt sick" about leaving the Canterbury club. His influence on teammates also evident when club captain, James Graham, appeared visibly upset on the TV show NRL 360 while talking of Reynolds departure at the end of the year. In Round 18 against the Newcastle Knights, in his final game at Belmore Oval, he was sent off a winner at the death, with Moses Mbye running 70 metres to score the match winning try, afterwards the crowd ran onto the field to celebrate with Reynolds after securing a 20–18 victory. In Round 26 against the St George Illawarra Dragons, Reynolds played his last match in Canterbury colours but injured his ankle in process of scoring his try and sat out most of his farewell match in the 26–20 win at ANZ Stadium. Reynolds finished his last year with Canterbury scoring 5 tries from 17 matches.

=== 2018 ===
After the departure of Aaron Woods, Reynolds was named as one of 5 co-captains at Wests Tigers, alongside Benji Marshall, Chris Lawrence, Russell Packer and Elijah Taylor. Coach Ivan Cleary said, "I just think it's the right model for us right now. When we started this preseason it was pretty obvious straight away that there was no real pecking order. There was no set culture to adhere to. It was all new".

Named at five-eighth for round 1, Reynolds was a late withdrawal with a hamstring tear. Reynolds then made his long-awaited debut in round 6 against Manly but suffered a shoulder bone fracture and was ruled out for at least 4–6 weeks. In round 14, against Cronulla-Sutherland Sharks, he captained his first and only game for the Tigers in a 16–24 loss. On 17 July, Reynolds was ruled out for the season with a shoulder injury, having scored two tries from his five appearances.

=== 2019 ===
Reynolds was not selected for first-grade in the opening rounds, playing for the Western Suburbs Magpies feeder team instead. New coach Michael Maguire said, "He's had some issues with his body over the last couple of years and it's going to take some time. I just want to see him get out and enjoy his football." With an injury to Benji Marshall, Reynolds made his return to first grade in round 4, setting up 2 tries and getting a further 2 repeat sets with his kicking game in a Man of the Match performance. After getting a further 2 repeat sets in round 5, commentator Braith Anasta said, "He’s becoming a master at these kicks. He gets the timing and the depth of the kicks and he’s the first one there in the chase."

In July 2019, Reynolds was told by Wests that he was free to negotiate with other teams for the 2020 season after it was revealed that he wasn't in the club's plans following the conclusion of the 2019 season.

==== Controversy ====
On 12 December 2019, it was revealed that Reynolds was charged with assault occasioning actual bodily harm relating to an alleged domestic violence incident. The matter was handed to the NRL's Integrity Unit. Reynolds' club later read out a statement saying “Wests Tigers have today confirmed that Josh Reynolds has been charged by New South Wales Police with a domestic violence offence. Both Josh and Wests Tigers have previously alerted the police and the NRL to this matter and will continue to work closely with the NRL Integrity Unit and NSW Police as Josh vigorously defends this charge. As this is an ongoing legal matter, Wests Tigers will be making no further comment at this time".

Reynolds was granted conditional bail to appear at Sutherland Local Court on 18 December 2019.

On 18 December 2019, Reynolds pleaded not guilty to the charges of assault occasioning actual bodily harm. Reynolds argued that bruising found on his ex-partner was not the result of violence, but instead a side-effect of medication she had been taking. The case was later adjourned until 23 July 2020.

On 22 January 2020, Fox Sports released a video which was leaked online showing Reynolds verbally abusing a woman who was at his residence. In the 37 second video, Reynolds can be seen swearing at the woman saying "Give me my phone, where the fuck is it? Get out of my house. I want you out now. I want you out now or I'm going to fucking flip it. I swear to god I'm going to flip it". Reynolds then called the woman a "cunt" and a "dog". The Wests Tigers then released a statement saying "Both Josh and Wests Tigers have previously alerted the NRL Unit as to this matter and will continue to work closely with them as required. As the subject matter is before the courts, Wests Tigers will be making no further comment".

On 6 February 2020, Reynolds was cleared to play by the NRL and had his court case in relation to domestic violence charges moved forward to 29 April 2020. It was also revealed by the Nine Network that the woman at the centre of Reynold's court case was an alleged con artist with several men coming forward claiming to have had relationships with the woman who had used fake names and had stolen money under false pretences in each individual relationship. It was alleged in Reynold's relationship with the woman that she faked being pregnant on three separate occasions. Reynolds also claimed the woman had told him her mother had died and she needed money for the funeral when she was in fact alive and well.

On 26 February 2020, Reynolds had the charges against him dropped and his court case was cancelled, and when Reynolds spoke to the media, he sent a message to the woman involved saying "Arabella, whatever your name is, you said to me that you were going to bring me and my mum down. But we're still standing, we're still here. So that's just a little message to you. You tried to bring me, my family and my mum down – and it didn't work".

=== 2020 ===
In round 2 of the 2020 NRL season, Reynolds scored his first try of the year and provided a try assist but it wasn't enough as the club were defeated 24–42 by Newcastle at an empty Leichhardt Oval.

On 6 September, it was reported that Reynolds and teammate Russell Packer had left the Wests Tigers round 17 match against Manly-Warringah at half-time which was against team protocols. Wests Tigers CEO Justin Pascoe released a statement saying "The actions are not acceptable from my perspective. We are focused on ensuring every single person, player coach administrator board members actions are in complete alignment with the expectation of higher standards".

Reynolds played a total of ten games for Wests in the 2020 NRL season scoring one try as the club missed out on the finals by finishing 11th.

On 6 December 2020, it was announced that Reynolds had been released from the remainder of his contract with Wests Tigers, and had signed a two-year deal (with the option of a third) with Betfred Super League side Hull F.C. After signing with Hull, Reynolds spoke to the media saying “To be fair I was a dud buy for the Tigers because they didn’t get their moneys worth, That’s fine, I’m happy to admit that. But then again I can’t control injury or selection so I don’t know what people want me to do".

=== 2021 ===
In round 1 of the 2021 Super League season, Reynolds made his debut for Hull F.C. and put in a man of the match performance which included scoring a try in a 22–10 win over Huddersfield.

The following week, Reynolds scored two tries in a 35–4 victory over Salford.

=== 2022 ===
On 22 June 2022, Hull F.C. released a statement confirming they had reached a mutual agreement with Reynolds to terminate his contract early. This follows a very poor spell with the club which did not live up to the expectations of both the club and its supporters. Reynolds was known to be the clubs highest paid player in their history but the clubs management decided to cut their losses to allow recruitment to begin for a replacement. On 26 October, Reynolds re-joined his former club Canterbury on a 12-week train and trial contract.

=== 2023 ===
On 28 January, Reynolds was informed he had been elevated to the Top 30 squad for the Canterbury club, with the news being made public on 1 February. Reynolds was left out of the Canterbury side for their opening round loss against Manly. He instead played for the club's NSW Cup team. On 2 April, Reynolds made his return to first-grade for Canterbury, playing off the bench in their 15-14 win over the North Queensland Cowboys.

On July 10, Reynolds announced his retirement from professional rugby league, after it was revealed he selflessly gave up his position in the club’s top 30 squad to allow the club to sign halfback Toby Sexton from the Gold Coast Titans.

== Honours ==
On 18 February 2024, Reynolds was inducted as a life member of the Canterbury-Bankstown Bulldogs.
