= 2018 Wests Tigers season =

- NRL rank: 9th
- 2018 record: Wins: 12; draws: 0; losses: 12
- Points scored: For: 377; against: 460

Team information
- CEO: Justin Pascoe
- Coach: Ivan Cleary
- Assistant coach: Andrew Webster
- Captain: Chris Lawrence, Benji Marshall, Elijah Taylor, Josh Reynolds, Russell Packer
- Stadium: Leichhardt Oval; Campbelltown Sports Ground; Stadium Australia
- Avg. attendance: 17,291
- High attendance: 30,420 (vs. Parramatta, round 4)

Top scorers
- Tries: Corey Thompson (7)
- Goals: Esan Marsters (33)
- Points: Esan Marsters (70)
← 2017	2019 →

The 2018 Wests Tigers season was the 19th in the Wests Tigers's history. They completed the NRL's 2018 Telstra Premiership season in ninth place and did not qualify for the finals.

== 2018 Signings/Transfers ==
Gains

- Josh Reynolds from Canterbury-Bankstown Bulldogs
- Chris McQueen from Gold Coast Titans
- Ben Matulino from New Zealand Warriors
- Taane Milne from St. George Illawarra Dragons
- Russell Packer from Illawarra Dragons
- Tyson Gamble from Redcliffe Dolphins
- Mahe Fonua from Hull F.C.
- Corey Thompson from Widnes Vikings
- Benji Marshall from Brisbane Broncos
- Pita Godinet from Manly Warringah Sea Eagles
- Robbie Farah from South Sydney Rabbitohs

Out

- James Tedesco to Sydney Roosters
- Aaron Woods to Canterbury-Bankstown Bulldogs
- Matt Ballin to Retirement
- Ava Seumanufagai to Cronulla-Sutherland Sharks
- Ryan Papenhuyzen to Melbourne Storm
- Jack Littlejohn to Salford Red Devils November 2017
- Kyle Lovett to Leigh Centurions November 2017
- Jeremy Marshall-King to Canterbury-Bankstown Bulldogs November 2017
- Moses Suli to Canterbury-Bankstown Bulldogs February 2018

== Season summary ==
The 2018 Wests Tigers season was the club's 19th year in the National Rugby League (NRL), concluding with a 9th-place finish on the ladder and a balanced record of 12 wins and 12 losses, which saw them narrowly miss qualification for the finals. The season featured significant player movements, including the arrivals of Josh Reynolds, Ben Matulino, Russell Packer, and several others, while key departures included James Tedesco to the Sydney Roosters and Aaron Woods to the Canterbury-Bankstown Bulldogs. Notable milestones during the season included Chris Lawrence becoming the club's all-time leading try scorer with 77 tries and Benji Marshall making a celebrated return to the team after playing with the St. George Illawarra Dragons and Brisbane Broncos. Despite some strong individual and team performances, the Tigers were unable to secure a spot in the finals series.

== Milestones ==
- Round 1 (vs. Sydney Roosters): Corey Thompson (209), Russell Packer (210), Pita Godinet (211), Ben Matulino (212) and Robbie Rochow (213) make their Wests Tigers debut.
- Round 1 (vs. Sydney Roosters): Benji Marshall makes his return to the club after playing with St. George Illawarra Dragons and Brisbane Broncos.
- Round 5 (vs. Melbourne Storm): Chris Lawrence becomes all-time leading Wests Tigers try scorer (77).
- Round 6 (vs. Manly): Josh Reynolds (214) makes his Wests Tigers debut.
- Round 7 (vs. Newcastle Knights): Kevin Naiqama 100th plays his NRL first grade game (including matches with Newcastle Knights and Penrith Panthers).
- Round 8 (vs. Parramatta Eels): Mahe Fonua (215) makes his Wests Tigers debut.
- Round 11 (vs. Penrith Panthers): Chris McQueen (216) makes his Wests Tigers debut.
- Round 13 (vs. Sydney Roosters): Elijah Taylor plays in his 150th NRL first grade game.
- Round 15 (vs. Canberra Raiders): Tyson Gamble (216) makes his NRL debut.
- Round 11 (vs. Canberra Raiders): Josh Aloiai played his 50th game for the Wests Tigers.

== Squad ==
2018 Wests Tigers Squad:

Wests Tigers 2018 Squad
NRL Squad 2018			Coaching staff
Josh Aloiai – SR, LK; Luke Brooks – HB; Michael Chee-Kam – SR, CE; Matt Eisenhuth – LK, PR, SR; Robbie Farah – HK; JJ Felise – PR; Mahe Fonua – WG, CE; Tyson Gamble – FE, HB; Heath Gibbs – SR, CE; Pita Godinet – HK, HB; Tim Grant – PR; Chris Lawrence (c) – SR, CE	Jacob Liddle – HK; Tuimoala Lolohea – FB, FE (gk); Benji Marshall (c) – FE, HB (gk); Esan Marsters – CE, SR (gk); Ben Matulino – PR; Moses Mbye – FB, HB; Matt McIlwrick – HK; Sam McIntyre – CE, WG; Chris McQueen – SR, LK; Thomas Mikaele – PR; Kevin Naiqama – CE, WG	David Nofoaluma – WG, FB; Russell Packer (c) – PR; Josh Reynolds (c) – FE, HK; Robbie Rochow – SR, PR; Bayley Sironen – LK, FE; Dylan Smith – FB; Sauaso Sue – PR, LK; Elijah Taylor (c) – LK, SR; Corey Thompson – FB, WG; Alex Twal – PR; Malakai Watene-Zelezniak – WG, CE	Head coach: Ivan Cleary; Assistant coaches: Andrew Webster(assistant); Craig Sandercock (assistant); Brett Hodgson (NSW Cup Head Coach); Craig Wilson (U20s Head Coach); Legend: (c) Captain(s); (vc) Vice-captain(s); Updated: 9 June 2018; Source(s): Tigers Squad 2018
