= 2017 Penrith Panthers season =

- NRL Rank: 7th
- Play-off result: Lost semi-final (FW2)
- 2017 record: Wins: 14; losses: 12
- Points scored: For: 532; against: 482

Team information
- Coach: Anthony Griffin
- Captain: Matt Moylan
- Stadium: Pepper Stadium – 22,500; Carrington Park – 13,000 (round 14 only)
- Avg. attendance: 12,922
- High attendance: 18,848 vs. Dragons, round 25

Top scorers
- Tries: Nathan Cleary (11)
- Goals: Nathan Cleary (92)
- Points: Nathan Cleary (228)

Home colours	Away colours
← 2016	List of seasons	2018 →

The 2017 Penrith Panthers season was the 51st in the club's history. Coached by Anthony Griffin and captained by Matt Moylan, the Panthers competed in the National Rugby League's 2017 Telstra Premiership. They also competed in the 2017 NRL Auckland Nines pre-season tournament, which they finished as runners-up.

== Squad ==
Penrith Panthers
2017 NRL Squad			Extended squad	Coaching staff
Sitaleki Akauola – SR, WG; Waqa Blake – CE, WG; Tim Browne – PR; Reagan Campbell-Gillard – PR; Bryce Cartwright – SR, FE; Nathan Cleary – HB; Dylan Edwards – WG, CE, FB; James Fisher-Harris – SR, LK, PR; Corey Harawira-Naera – SR; Peta Hiku – CE, WG – Loss: 20 Jun	Sione Katoa – HK; Viliame Kikau – PR; Leilani Latu – PR; Josh Mansour – WG; Te Maire Martin – FE – Loss: 16 Jun; Tyrone May – FE, LK; Trent Merrin (vc) – LK, SR; Matt Moylan (c) – FB, FE; Michael Oldfield – CE, WG – Loss: 29 Jun; Tyrone Peachey – LK, SR, FE, CE; Mitch Rein – HK	James Tamou – PR; Peter Wallace (vc) – HB, FE, HK; Dallin Watene-Zelezniak – WG, FB; Malakai Watene-Zelezniak – WG, CE – Loss: 29 Apr; Dean Whare – CE, FB, WG; Isaah Yeo – SR, CE	Samisoni Langi – FE, LK – Loss: 15 Jun; Sam McKendry – PR; Tony Satini – CE	Head coach: Anthony Griffin; Assistant coaches: Cameron Ciraldo; Garth Brennan (ISP coach); David Tangata-Toa (NYC coach); Tony Guilfoyle (Head of Performance); Legend: (c) Captain(s); (vc) Vice-captain(s)

=== Player transfers ===
A † denotes that the transfer occurred during the 2017 season.

Gains
Player	Signed from	Until end of	Ref.
Tim Browne	Canterbury-Bankstown Bulldogs	2019	
Jed Cartwright	Gold Coast Titans	2019	
Mason Cerruto	Parramatta Eels		
Samisoni Langi	South Sydney Rabbitohs		
Darren Nicholls	Brisbane Broncos	2017	
Michael Oldfield	South Sydney Rabbitohs	2017	
Mitch Rein	St. George Illawarra Dragons	2018	
Tony Satini	Manly Warringah Sea Eagles		
James Tamou	North Queensland Cowboys	2020	

Losses
Player	Signed To	Until end of	Ref.
Braidon Burns	South Sydney Rabbitohs	2018	
Zach Dockar-Clay†	Hull Kingston Rovers (Championship)	2018	
Chris Grevsmuhl	Released, later Gold Coast Titans	2018	
Josh Hall	Townsville Blackhawks (QLD Cup)		
Zak Hardaker	Castleford Tigers (Super League)	2017	
Andrew Heffernan	Hull Kingston Rovers (Championship)		
Peta Hiku†	Warrington Wolves (Super League)	2019	
George Jennings	Parramatta Eels	2017	
Robert Jennings	South Sydney Rabbitohs	2018	
Samisoni Langi†	Released, later Leigh Centurions (Super League)	2017	
Jeremy Latimore	Cronulla-Sutherland Sharks	2017	
Te Maire Martin†	North Queensland Cowboys	2019	
Suaia Matagi	Parramatta Eels	2018	
Michael Oldfield†	Canberra Raiders	2018	
Andy Saunders	Canterbury-Bankstown Bulldogs	2017	
Will Smith	Parramatta Eels		
Tupou Sopoaga	Western Sydney Rams (rugby union)		
Malakai Watene-Zelezniak†	Wests Tigers	2018	

== Auckland Nines ==
#	Player
1	Dylan Edwards
2	Corey Waddell
3	Waqa Blake
4	Jed Cartwright
5	Malakai Watene-Zelezniak
6	Nathan Cleary
7	Sitaleki Akauola
9	Sione Katoa
10	James Tamou
11	Isaah Yeo (c)
12	Moses Leota
13	Kaide Ellis
14	Darren Nicholls
15	Zach Dockar-Clay
16	Corey Harawira-Naera
17	Tyrone May
18	Christian Crichton
19	Oliver Clark

With club executives Brian Fletcher and Phil Gould questioning the necessity of the tournament, and a number of players unavailable for selection due to recent representative commitments, the Panthers fielded a largely inexperienced squad at the 2017 NRL Auckland Nines on 4–5 February. 9 of the 18 squad members had no previous NRL experience and only 3 had played more than 30 NRL games. Regardless, the team won all 3 of their pool matches, and progressed to the Grand Final, where they were defeated 10–8 by the Sydney Roosters. Waqa Blake and Moses Leota were named in the team of the tournament.

Date	Round	Opponent	Score	Tries	Goals
Saturday, 4 February	Game 2	Canterbury-Bankstown Bulldogs	28 – 18	Ellis, Harawira-Naera, Tamou (2), M. Watene-Zelezniak	Cleary (1/3), Dockar-Clay (2/2)
Saturday, 4 February	Game 9	Cronulla-Sutherland Sharks	14 – 16	J. Cartwright, Harawira-Naera, Leota	Narawira-Naera (1/2), Nicholls (1/1)
Sunday, 5 February	Game 18	Gold Coast Titans	4 – 22	Akauola, Dockar-Clay, Edwards, Katoa	Dockar-Clay (1/2), Narawira-Naera (1/2)
Sunday, 5 February	Quarter Final	Manly Warringah Sea Eagles	16 – 12	Blake, Katoa, May	Cleary (1/1), Nicholls (0/1)
Sunday, 5 February	Semi Final	Parramatta Eels	13 – 0	Blake (2), M. Watene-Zelezniak	Cleary (0/3)
Sunday, 5 February	Grand Final	Sydney Roosters	8 – 10	Cleary, M. Watene-Zelezniak	Cleary (0/1), Nicholls (0/1)
Legend: Win Loss Draw Bye

== Fixtures ==
=== Pre-season ===
Date	Round	Opponent	Venue	Score	Tries	Goals
Saturday, 11 February	Trial 1	Canterbury-Bankstown Bulldogs	Belmore Sports Ground	10 – 20	Blake, Cerruto, Harawira-Naera, Katoa	Dockar-Clay (1/2), Nicholls (1/2)
Saturday, 18 February	Trial 2	Parramatta Eels	Pepper Stadium	18 – 6	Latu, Martin, Whare	Cleary (3/3)
Legend: Win Loss Draw Bye

=== Regular season ===
Date	Round	Opponent	Venue	Score	Tries	Goals	Attendance
Saturday, 4 March	Round 1	St. George Illawarra Dragons	UOW Jubilee Oval	42 – 10	Blake, Peachey	Cleary (1/1), Wallace (0/1)	7,283
Sunday, 12 March	Round 2	Wests Tigers	Campbelltown Stadium	2 – 36	Cleary, Edwards, Kikau, Latu, Whare (2)	Cleary (6/7)	12,232
Saturday, 18 March	Round 3	Sydney Roosters	Pepper Stadium	12 – 14	Peachey	Cleary (4/4)	11,044
Friday, 24 March	Round 4	Newcastle Knights	Pepper Stadium	40 – 0	Cleary, Narawira-Naera, Martin, Peachey, Wallace, D. Watene-Zelezniak, Whare	Cleary (6/8)	10,567
Saturday, 1 April	Round 5	Melbourne Storm	AAMI Park	28 – 6	Martin	Cleary (1/1)	15,223
Friday, 7 April	Round 6	South Sydney Rabbitohs	Pepper Stadium	20 – 21	Harawira-Naera, Oldfield, D. Watene-Zelezniak	Cleary (4/4)	15,535
Sunday, 16 April	Round 7	Cronulla-Sutherland Sharks	Pepper Stadium	2 – 28		Cleary (1/1)	15,780
Saturday, 22 April	Round 8	Parramatta Eels	ANZ Stadium	18 – 12	Harawira-Naera, Hiku	Cleary (2/2)	14,070
Thursday, 27 April	Round 9	Brisbane Broncos	Suncorp Stadium	32 – 18	Campbell-Gillard, Merrin, Moylan	Cleary (3/3)	21,464
Saturday, 13 May	Round 10	New Zealand Warriors	Pepper Stadium	36 – 28	Yeo (2), Blake, Moylan, Peachey, D. Watene-Zelezniak	Cleary (6/6)	11,588
Sunday, 21 May	Round 11	Newcastle Knights	McDonald Jones Stadium	20 – 30	Moylan (2), Latu, Tamou, D. Watene-Zelezniak	Cleary (5/5)	13,319
	Round 12	Bye					
Sunday, 4 June	Round 13	Canterbury-Bankstown Bulldogs	ANZ Stadium	0 – 38	Rein (2), Blake, Cleary, Harawira-Naera, Mansour, Moylan	Cleary (5/7)	11,283
Saturday, 10 June	Round 14	Canberra Raiders	Carrington Park	24 – 20	Cleary, Harawira-Naera, Moylan, Peachey	Cleary (4/4)	8,730
	Round 15	Bye					
Saturday, 24 June	Round 16	North Queensland Cowboys	1300SMILES Stadium	14 – 12	Cleary, Harawira-Naera	Cleary (2/2)	17,876
Sunday, 2 July	Round 17	South Sydney Rabbitohs	ANZ Stadium	42 – 14	Mansour, Moylan	Cleary (3/3)	14,103
Saturday, 8 July	Round 18	Manly Warringah Sea Eagles	Pepper Stadium	16 – 8	Tamou, D. Watene-Zelezniak	Cleary (4/4)	14,625
Friday, 14 July	Round 19	New Zealand Warriors	Mount Smart Stadium	22 – 34	Cleary (3), Blake, Harawira-Naera, May	Cleary (5/6)	13,076
Saturday, 22 July	Round 20	Gold Coast Titans	Pepper Stadium	24 – 16	Blake (2), Moylan, D. Watene-Zelezniak	Cleary (4/5)	11,480
Thursday, 27 July	Round 21	Canterbury-Bankstown Bulldogs	Pepper Stadium	16 – 8	Peachey, Wallace, D. Watene-Zelezniak	Cleary (2/4)	8,727
Sunday, 6 August	Round 22	Wests Tigers	Pepper Stadium	28 – 14	D. Watene-Zelezniak (2), Edwards, May, Peachey	Cleary (4/5)	15,780
Saturday, 12 August	Round 23	North Queensland Cowboys	Pepper Stadium	24 – 16	Cleary (2), Mansour, Tamou	Cleary (4/4)	12,357
Sunday, 20 August	Round 24	Canberra Raiders	GIO Stadium	22 – 26	Blake, Cleary, Mansour, May	Cleary (5/5)	14,818
Sunday, 27 August	Round 25	St. George Illawarra Dragons	Pepper Stadium	14 – 16	Mansour, May	Cleary (3/3)	18,848
Saturday, 2 September	Round 26	Manly Warringah Sea Eagles	Lottoland	28 – 12	Campbell-Gillard, May	Cleary (2/2)	14,423
Legend: Win Loss Draw Bye

=== Finals ===
Qualifying and elimination finals
9 September – Melbourne
1	Melbourne Storm	18
4	Parramatta Eels	16
10 September – Sydney
5	Cronulla-Sutherland Sharks	14
8	North Queensland Cowboys	15
9 September – Sydney
6	Manly-Warringah Sea Eagles	10
7	Penrith Panthers	22
8 September – Sydney
2	Sydney Roosters	24
3	Brisbane Broncos	22

Semi-finals
16 September – Sydney
Parramatta Eels	16
North Queensland Cowboys	24
15 September – Brisbane
Brisbane Broncos	13
Penrith Panthers	6

Preliminary finals
22 September – Melbourne
Melbourne Storm	30
Brisbane Broncos	0
23 September – Sydney
Sydney Roosters	16
North Queensland Cowboys	29

Grand final
1 October – Sydney
Melbourne Storm	34
North Queensland Cowboys	6

Date	Round	Opponent	Venue	Score	Tries	Goals	Attendance
Saturday, 9 September	Elimination Final	Manly Warringah Sea Eagles	Allianz Stadium	10 – 22	Cartwright (2), Peachey	Cleary (5/5)	15,408
Friday, 15 September	Semi Final	Brisbane Broncos	Suncorp Stadium	13 – 6	Campbell-Gillard	Cleary (1/1)	38,623
Legend: Win Loss Draw Bye

== Statistics ==
Name	Age	App	T	G	FG	Pts
Sitaleki Akauola	25	7	0	0	0	0
Waqa Blake	23	23	7	0	0	28
Tim Browne	30	19	0	0	0	0
Reagan Campbell-Gillard	24	26	3	0	0	12
Bryce Cartwright	23	14	2	0	0	8
Nathan Cleary	20	26	11	92/102	0	228
Dylan Edwards	21	16	2	0	0	8
James Fisher-Harris	22	14	0	0	0	0
Corey Harawira-Naera	23	21	7	0	0	28
Peta Hiku	25	9	1	0	0	4
Sione Katoa	22	12	0	0	0	0
Viliame Kikau	22	9	1	0	0	4
Leilani Latu	24	19	2	0	0	8
Moses Leota	22	10	0	0	0	0
Josh Mansour	27	15	5	0	0	20
Te Maire Martin	22	7	2	0	0	8
Tyrone May	21	9	5	0	0	20
Trent Merrin	28	22	1	0	0	4
Matt Moylan	26	18	8	0	0	32
Michael Oldfield	27	1	1	0	0	4
Tyrone Peachey	26	25	8	0	0	32
Mitch Rein	27	5	2	0	0	8
James Tamou	29	26	3	0	0	12
Peter Wallace	32	19	2	0/1	0	8
Dallin Watene-Zelezniak	22	24	9	0	0	36
Malakai Watene-Zelezniak	26	1	0	0	0	0
Dean Whare	27	18	3	0	0	12
Isaah Yeo	23	25	2	0	0	8
28 players	24.54	26	87	92/103	0	532

== Ladder ==
2017 NRL season
Pos	Team	Pld	W	D	L	B	PF	PA	PD	Pts
1	Melbourne Storm (P)	24	20	0	4	2	633	336	+297	44
2	Sydney Roosters	24	17	0	7	2	500	428	+72	38
3	Brisbane Broncos	24	16	0	8	2	597	433	+164	36
4	Parramatta Eels	24	16	0	8	2	496	457	+39	36
5	Cronulla-Sutherland Sharks	24	15	0	9	2	476	407	+69	34
6	Manly-Warringah Sea Eagles	24	14	0	10	2	552	512	+40	32
7	Penrith Panthers	24	13	0	11	2	504	459	+45	30
8	North Queensland Cowboys	24	13	0	11	2	467	443	+24	30
9	St. George Illawarra Dragons	24	12	0	12	2	533	450	+83	28
10	Canberra Raiders	24	11	0	13	2	558	497	+61	26
11	Canterbury-Bankstown Bulldogs	24	10	0	14	2	360	455	−95	24
12	South Sydney Rabbitohs	24	9	0	15	2	464	564	−100	22
13	New Zealand Warriors	24	7	0	17	2	444	575	−131	18
14	Wests Tigers	24	7	0	17	2	413	571	−158	18
15	Gold Coast Titans	24	7	0	17	2	448	638	−190	18
16	Newcastle Knights	24	5	0	19	2	428	648	−220	14

== Other teams ==
In addition to competing in the National Rugby League, the Panthers also fielded semi-professional teams in the National Youth Competition's 2017 Holden Cup (Under-20s) and the New South Wales Rugby League's 2017 Intrust Super Premiership (NSW Cup). The NYC team was coached by Garth Brennan and captained by Wayde Egan, and the NSW Cup team was coached by David Tangata-Toa and captained by Sione Katoa in early rounds and Darren Nicholls in later rounds.

The club won the 2017 New South Wales Cup season and the 2017 NRL State Championship.

=== Finals ===
Qualifying and elimination finals
Sydney Football Stadium
1	Wyong	34
4	Canterbury	26
Jubilee Oval
5	Mount Pritchard	26
8	Illawarra	30
Jubilee Oval
6	North Sydney	18
7	Newcastle	40
Jubilee Oval
2	New Zealand	20
3	Penrith	36

Semi-finals
Jubilee Oval
Canterbury-Bankstown	32
Illawarra	14
Jubilee Oval
New Zealand	30
Newcastle	6

Preliminary finals
Leichhardt Oval
Wyong	16
New Zealand	12
Leichhardt Oval
Penrith	16
Canterbury-Bankstown	12

Grand final
Leichhardt Oval
Wyong	12
Penrith	20

== Representative honours ==
=== Domestic ===
Pos.	Player	Team	Call-up	Ref.
BE	Leilani Latu	Indigenous All Stars	2017 All Stars match	
BE	Tyrone Peachey	Indigenous All Stars	2017 All Stars match	
PR	Reagan Campbell-Gillard	World All Stars	2017 All Stars match	
SR	Bryce Cartwright	World All Stars	2017 All Stars match	
Five-eighth	Bryce Cartwright	NSW City	2017 City vs Country Origin	
BE	Nathan Cleary	NSW City	2017 City vs Country Origin	
FB	Matt Moylan	NSW City	2017 City vs Country Origin	
CE	Tyrone Peachey	NSW City	2017 City vs Country Origin	
PR	James Tamou	NSW City	2017 City vs Country Origin	
18	Matt Moylan	New South Wales	2017 State of Origin	
18	Trent Merrin	New South Wales	2017 State of Origin	

=== International ===
Pos.	Player	Team	Call-up	Ref.
LK	Trent Merrin	Australia	2017 Anzac Test	
WG	Dallin Watene-Zelezniak	New Zealand	2017 Anzac Test	
CE	Dean Whare	New Zealand	2017 Anzac Test	
CE	Waqa Blake	Fiji	2017 Pacific Test vs Tonga	
SR	Viliame Kikau	Fiji	2017 Pacific Test vs Tonga	
BE	Sione Katoa	Tonga	2017 Pacific Test vs Fiji	
18	Samisoni Langi	Tonga	2017 Pacific Test vs Fiji	
PR	Leilani Latu	Tonga	2017 Pacific Test vs Fiji	
PR	Cowen Epere	Malta	2017 Pre-World Cup Test vs Italy	
BE	Reagan Campbell-Gillard	Australia	2017 World Cup	
WG	Josh Mansour	Australia	2017 World Cup	
SR	Viliame Kikau	Fiji	2017 World Cup	
WG	Mason Cerruto	Italy	2017 World Cup	
WG	Dallin Watene-Zelezniak	New Zealand	2017 World Cup	
CE	Dean Whare	New Zealand	2017 World Cup	
FE	Jarome Luai	Samoa	2017 World Cup	
CE	Lachlan Stein	Scotland	2017 World Cup	
BE	Sione Katoa	Tonga	2017 World Cup	
