= 2016 Penrith Panthers season =

- NRL Rank: 6th
- Play-off result: Lost semi final vs. Raiders, 22–12
- 2016 record: Wins: 15; losses: 11
- Points scored: For: 603; against: 497

Team information
- CEO: Corey Payne (15 April – 16 August)
- Coach: Anthony Griffin
- Captain: Matt Moylan
- Stadium: Pepper Stadium – 22,500; Carrington Park – 13,000 (round 9 only); AMI Stadium – 18,000 (round 10 only)
- Avg. attendance: 12,910 (Pepper Stadium only)
- High attendance: 15,411 vs. Sea Eagles, round 26 (Pepper Stadium only)

Top scorers
- Tries: Josh Mansour (16)
- Goals: Nathan Cleary (53)
- Points: Nathan Cleary (118)

Home colours	Away colours
← 2015	List of seasons	2017 →

The 2016 Penrith Panthers season was the 50th in the club's history. Coached by Anthony Griffin and captained by Matt Moylan, the Panthers competed in the NRL's 2016 Telstra Premiership. They also competed in the 2016 NRL Auckland Nines pre-season tournament.

The Panthers started their season with a string of close results, but failed to win consecutive games during the competition's opening two months. Over the course of the year, new coach Anthony Griffin redefined who was already well established within the team, and experienced playmakers Jamie Soward and James Segeyaro would later be released from their contracts mid-season. The Panthers finished the regular season with seven wins from their final eight games, securing 6th position and a place in the finals series.

== Jersey and Sponsors ==
The Panthers' 2016 jersey, made by ASICS, was designed to commemorate the club's 50th season. The names of all those who have played 50 or more games for the club adorn the front of the jersey, while the back of the jersey features all five of the Panthers logos, past and present. Unlike the black and teal colour combination used in previous seasons, the Panthers adopted a black and golden brown colour scheme in 2016. The home jersey is black with golden brown panels and the away jersey is the inverse. OAK Milk again featured as the major sponsor, with Hertz once more on the sleeve.

On three occasions during the season, the Panthers wore unique heritage jerseys to celebrate the club's history. The celebratory jerseys were based on jersey designs from previous seasons, but were remade in the style of the current jerseys. The 1967 heritage jersey, worn against the Canterbury-Bankstown Bulldogs in round 2, was based on the club's 'Chocolate Soldiers' jersey from their inaugural 1967 season. The 1991 heritage jersey, worn against the Canberra Raiders in round 9, was based on the jersey worn during the club's premiership winning 1991 season. Likewise, the 2003 heritage jersey, worn against the Sydney Roosters in round 22, was based on the jersey worn during the club's premiership winning 2003 season. Listed on each of the jerseys is the names of all those who played for the club in that respective season.

1967 heritage jersey

1991 heritage jersey

2003 heritage jersey

== Squad ==
Penrith Panthers
2016 NRL Team			Coaching staff
Sitaleki Akauola – SR, WG; Waqa Blake – CE, WG; Reagan Campbell-Gillard – PR; Bryce Cartwright – SR, FE; Nathan Cleary – HB; Dylan Edwards – WG, CE, FB, FE; James Fisher-Harris – SR, LK, PR; Chris Grevsmuhl – SR, LK – Gain: 20 May; Zak Hardaker – FB, CE – Gain: 22 June; Peta Hiku – CE, WG, FB; Jeremy Latimore – PR; Leilani Latu – PR; Moses Leota – PR	Josh Mansour – WG; Te Maire Martin – FE; Suaia Matagi – PR; Sam McKendry – PR; Trent Merrin – LK, SR; Matt Moylan (c) – FB; Tyrone Peachey – LK, SR, FE, CE; James Segeyaro – HK – Loss: 22 June; Will Smith – FB, FE; Jamie Soward – FE, HB – Loss: 30 June; Elijah Taylor – LK, SR – Loss: 2 May; Peter Wallace (vc) – HB, FE, HK; Dallin Watene-Zelezniak – WG, FB	Dean Whare – CE, FB, WG; Isaah Yeo – SR, CE; Extended squad players: Stanton Albert – PR; Wellington Albert – PR, WG; Benjamin Garcia – SR, CE – Loss: 23 June; Josh Hall – WG; George Jennings – CE; Robert Jennings – CE; Sione Katoa – HK; Viliame Kikau – PR; Chris Smith – WG – Loss: 6 April; Tupou Sopoaga – SR, LK	Head coach: Anthony Griffin; Assistant coaches: Garth Brennan; Steve Georgallis (NSW Cup Coach); Cameron Ciraldo (NYC Coach); Legend: (c) Captain(s); (vc) Vice-captain(s); Updated: 22 August 2016; Source(s): Panthers Squad 2016

=== Player transfers ===
A † denotes that the transfer occurred during the 2016 season.

Gains
Player	Signed From	Until End of	Notes
Sitaleki Akauola	Wests Tigers		
Zach Dockar-Clay	Parramatta Eels	2017	
Benjamin Garcia	Catalans Dragons (Super League)	2017	
Chris Grevsmuhl†	South Sydney Rabbitohs	2018	
Josh Hall	Gold Coast Suns (AFL – Australian rules)	2017	
Zak Hardaker†	Leeds Rhinos (Super League)	2016 (on loan)	
Andrew Heffernan	Canberra Raiders		
Peta Hiku	Manly Warringah Sea Eagles	2018	
Viliame Kikau	North Queensland Cowboys	2017	
Te Maire Martin	Wests Tigers	2018	
Suaia Matagi	Sydney Roosters	2016	
Trent Merrin	St. George Illawarra Dragons	2018	

Losses
Player	Signed To	Until End of	Notes
Sam Anderson	Redcliffe Dolphins (QLD Cup)	2017	
Lewis Brown	Manly Warringah Sea Eagles	2018	
Adam Docker	Retirement	-	
Daniel Foster	Easts Tigers (QLD Cup)	2017	
Benjamin Garcia†	Catalans Dragons (Super League)	2018	
Jamal Idris	Released	-	
Isaac John	Manly Warringah Sea Eagles	2016	
Brent Kite	Retirement	-	
Apisai Koroisau	Manly Warringah Sea Eagles	2018	
Sika Manu	Hull F.C. (Super League)		
Kieren Moss	Parramatta Eels	2016	
Ben Murdoch-Masila	Salford Red Devils (Super League)		
Nigel Plum	Retirement	-	
Sam Scarlett	Brisbane Broncos		
James Segeyaro†	Leeds Rhinos (Super League)	2016	
David Simmons	Retirement	-	
Chris Smith†	Sydney Roosters	2017	
Jamie Soward†	London Broncos (Championship)		
Shaun Spence	Retirement	-	
Elijah Taylor†	Wests Tigers	2016	

== Fixtures ==
=== Auckland Nines ===
Penrith Panthers
2016 Auckland Nines Squad		Did not play	Coaching staff
1 Dallin Watene-Zelezniak; 2 Josh Mansour; 3 Waqa Blake; 4 Robert Jennings; 5 Te Maire Martin; 6 Sione Katoa; 7 Will Smith; 8 Suaia Matagi; 9 James Segeyaro	10 Jeremy Latimore (c); 11 Bryce Cartwright; 12 Isaah Yeo; 13 Elijah Taylor; 14 Corey Harawira-Naera; 15 Benjamin Garcia; 16 Zach Dockar-Clay; 17 Chris Smith; 18 Moses Leota	Reagan Campbell-Gillard	Head coach: Anthony Griffin; Legend: (c) Captain(s); (vc) Vice-captain(s); Updated: Source(s):

Rangitoto Pool
Team	Pld	W	D	L	PF	PA	PD	Pts
North Queensland Cowboys	3	2	0	1	55	36	+19	4
Newcastle Knights	3	2	0	1	48	58	−10	4
Penrith Panthers	3	1	0	2	48	37	+11	2
Wests Tigers	3	1	0	2	36	56	−20	2

Date	Round	Opponent	Venue	Score	Tries	Goals	Attendance
Saturday, 6 February	Game 4	Wests Tigers	Eden Park	23–7	Blake (3), Mansour, Watene-Zelezniak	Cartwright (1/2), Harawira-Naera (0/1), Martin (1/1), W Smith (0/1)	37,000
Saturday, 6 February	Game 11	Newcastle Knights	Eden Park	14–15	Dockar-Clay, R Jennings, Latimore	Harawira-Naera (0/1), Martin (0/1), W Smith (1/1)	37,000
Sunday, 7 February	Game 20	North Queensland Cowboys	Eden Park	11–15	Cartwright, Garcia	Cartwright (0/1), Martin (1/1)	37,000
Legend: Win Loss Draw Bye

=== Pre-season ===
Date	Round	Opponent	Venue	Score	Tries	Goals
Saturday, 13 February	Trial 1	Canterbury-Bankstown Bulldogs	Pepper Stadium	24–20	Hall, Martin, C Smith, Taylor, Watene-Zelezniak	Moylan (2/2), Harawira-Naera (0/1), Dockar-Clay (0/1), Cleary (0/1)
Saturday, 20 February	Trial 2	Parramatta Eels	Pepper Stadium	8–22	Blake, Mansour	Soward (0/2)
Legend: Win Loss Draw Bye

=== Regular season ===
Date	Round	Opponent	Venue	Score	Tries	Goals	Attendance
Saturday, 5 March	Round 1	Canberra Raiders	GIO Stadium	30–22	Hiku, Mansour, Merrin	Soward (5/5)	11,297
Thursday, 10 March	Round 2	Canterbury-Bankstown Bulldogs	Pepper Stadium	16–18	Hiku, McKendry	Soward (4/4)	11,125
Saturday, 19 March	Round 3	Brisbane Broncos	Pepper Stadium	23–22	Cartwright, Hiku, Latimore, Martin	Soward (3/5), Martin (1 FG)	12,086
Sunday, 27 March	Round 4	St. George Illawarra Dragons	WIN Stadium	14–12	Hiku, Mansour	Soward (2/3)	12,983
Sunday, 3 April	Round 5	Parramatta Eels	Pirtek Stadium	18–20	Cartwright (2), Mansour, Wallace	Soward (2/4)	15,600
Saturday, 9 April	Round 6	North Queensland Cowboys	Pepper Stadium	18–23	Merrin, Watene-Zelezniak (2)	Soward (3/4)	13,725
Monday, 18 April	Round 7	Sydney Roosters	Allianz Stadium	16–20	Blake, Martin, Watene-Zelezniak	Soward (4/4)	10,117
Sunday, 24 April	Round 8	Cronulla-Sutherland Sharks	Southern Cross Group Stadium	20–18	Fisher-Harris (2), Moylan, Yeo	Soward (1/3), Moylan (0/1)	14,273
Saturday, 30 April	Round 9	Canberra Raiders	Carrington Park	19–18	Cartwright, Hiku, Peachey	Soward (3/4), Wallace (1 FG)	6,721
Saturday, 14 May	Round 10	New Zealand Warriors	AMI Stadium	30–18	Peachey (3), Soward, Watene-Zelezniak	Soward (5/6)	18,000
Sunday, 22 May	Round 11	Gold Coast Titans	Pepper Stadium	24–28	Latu, Mansour, Peachey, Watene-Zelezniak	Soward (4/5)	11,210
	Round 12	Bye					
Saturday, 4 June	Round 13	Melbourne Storm	AAMI Park	24–6	Mansour	Soward (1/1)	11,116
Sunday, 12 June	Round 14	Manly Warringah Sea Eagles	Brookvale Oval	24–31	Cleary, Latu, Mansour, Peachey, Wallace, Watene-Zelezniak	Moylan (0/2, 1 FG), Wallace (3/4)	12,463
	Round 15	Bye					
Friday, 24 June	Round 16	South Sydney Rabbitohs	Pepper Stadium	28–26	Cleary, Grevsmuhl, Latu, Mansour, Watene-Zelezniak	Cleary (4/5)	13,080
Saturday, 2 July	Round 17	Wests Tigers	ANZ Stadium	34–26	Fisher-Harris, Mansour, Merrin, Yeo	Cleary (5/5)	10,582
Sunday, 10 July	Round 18	Cronulla-Sutherland Sharks	Pepper Stadium	10–26	Latu, Yeo	Cleary (1/3)	12,682
Saturday, 16 July	Round 19	Parramatta Eels	Pepper Stadium	22–18	Campbell-Gillard, Cartwright, Mansour, Peachey	Cleary (3/4)	15,251
Friday, 22 July	Round 20	Brisbane Broncos	Suncorp Stadium	12–31	Blake, Fisher-Harris, Hardaker, Merrin, Moylan	Cleary (5/6), Moylan (1 FG)	30,878
Saturday, 30 July	Round 21	New Zealand Warriors	Mount Smart Stadium	20–16	Mansour (2), Peachey	Cleary (2/4)	13,026
Monday, 8 August	Round 22	Sydney Roosters	Pepper Stadium	38–18	Blake, Cartwright, Cleary, Grevsmuhl, Peachey (2), Yeo	Cleary (5/7)	9,653
Sunday, 14 August	Round 23	Newcastle Knights	Hunter Stadium	6–42	Blake, Mansour (2), Moylan, Peachey, Watene-Zelezniak (2)	Cleary (7/8)	13,771
Friday, 19 August	Round 24	Wests Tigers	Pepper Stadium	40–10	Blake, Campbell-Gillard, Cartwright, Fisher-Harris, Merrin, Wallace, Yeo	Cleary (6/7)	14,876
Saturday, 27 August	Round 25	Gold Coast Titans	Cbus Super Stadium	14–15	Blake, Moylan	Cleary (3/3), Moylan (1 FG)	18,288
Sunday, 4 September	Round 26	Manly Warringah Sea Eagles	Pepper Stadium	36–6	Blake, Cartwright, Mansour (2), Wallace, Watene-Zelezniak	Cleary (6/6)	15,411
Legend: Win Loss Draw Bye

=== Finals ===
Qualifying and elimination finals
10 Sept, Melbourne Rectangular Stadium
1	Melbourne	16
4	North Queensland	10
9 Sept, Lang Park
5	Brisbane	44
8	Gold Coast	28
11 Sept, Sydney Football Stadium
6	Penrith	28
7	Canterbury	12
10 Sept, Canberra Stadium
2	Canberra	14
3	Cronulla	16

Semi-finals
16 Sept, Willows Sports Complex
North Queensland	26
Brisbane	20
17 Sept, Canberra Stadium
Canberra	22
Penrith	12

Preliminary finals
24 Sept, Melbourne Rectangular Stadium
Melbourne	14
Canberra	12
23 Sept, Sydney Football Stadium
Cronulla	32
North Queensland	20

Grand final
2 Oct, Stadium Australia
Melbourne	12
Cronulla	14

Date	Round	Opponent	Venue	Score	Tries	Goals	Attendance
Sunday, 11 September	Elimination Final	Canterbury-Bankstown Bulldogs	Allianz Stadium	28–12	Blake, Mansour, Peachey, Wallace, Watene-Zelezniak	Cleary (4/6)	22,631
Saturday, 17 September	Semi Final	Canberra Raiders	GIO Stadium	22–12	Peachey, Watene-Zelezniak	Cleary (2/2)	21,498
Legend: Win Loss Draw Bye

== Ladder ==
2016 NRL season
Pos	Team	Pld	W	D	L	B	PF	PA	PD	Pts
1	Melbourne Storm	24	19	0	5	2	563	302	+261	42
2	Canberra Raiders	24	17	1	6	2	688	456	+232	39
3	Cronulla-Sutherland Sharks (P)	24	17	1	6	2	580	404	+176	39
4	North Queensland Cowboys	24	15	0	9	2	584	355	+229	34
5	Brisbane Broncos	24	15	0	9	2	554	434	+120	34
6	Penrith Panthers	24	14	0	10	2	563	463	+100	32
7	Canterbury-Bankstown Bulldogs	24	14	0	10	2	506	448	+58	32
8	Gold Coast Titans	24	11	1	12	2	508	497	+11	27
9	Wests Tigers	24	11	0	13	2	499	607	−108	26
10	New Zealand Warriors	24	10	0	14	2	513	601	−88	24
11	St. George Illawarra Dragons	24	10	0	14	2	341	538	−197	24
12	South Sydney Rabbitohs	24	9	0	15	2	473	549	−76	22
13	Manly-Warringah Sea Eagles	24	8	0	16	2	454	563	−109	20
14	Parramatta Eels	24	13	0	11	2	298	324	−26	18^{1}
15	Sydney Roosters	24	6	0	18	2	443	576	−133	16
16	Newcastle Knights	24	1	1	22	2	305	800	−495	7

^{1} Parramatta were deducted 12 competition points and their for/against tally accumulated between rounds 1-9 for gross long-term salary cap breaches.

== Statistics ==
Player statistics
Name	App	T	G	FG	Pts
Sitaleki Akauola	14	0	0	0	0
Waqa Blake	21	8	0	0	32
Reagan Campbell-Gillard	20	2	0	0	8
Bryce Cartwright	26	8	0	0	32
Nathan Cleary	15	3	53	0	118
Dylan Edwards	1	0	0	0	0
James Fisher-Harris	23	5	0	0	20
Chris Grevsmuhl	14	2	0	0	8
Zak Hardaker	11	1	0	0	4
Peta Hiku	11	5	0	0	20
Jeremy Latimore	19	1	0	0	4
Leilani Latu	24	4	0	0	16
Moses Leota	4	0	0	0	0
Sam McKendry	12	1	0	0	4
Josh Mansour	25	16	0	0	64
Te Maire Martin	6	2	0	1	9
Suaia Matagi	23	0	0	0	0
Trent Merrin	25	5	0	0	20
Matt Moylan	21	4	0	3	19
Tyrone Peachey	24	13	0	0	52
James Segeyaro	4	0	0	0	0
Will Smith	4	0	0	0	0
Jamie Soward	12	1	37	0	78
Elijah Taylor	2	0	0	0	0
Peter Wallace	26	5	3	1	27
Dallin Watene-Zelezniak	26	12	0	0	48
Dean Whare	1	0	0	0	0
Isaah Yeo	26	5	0	0	20
Totals	26	103	93	5	603

Goal kicking
Name	GK	GM	GK%
Nathan Cleary	53	12	81.54
Matt Moylan	0	3	0.00
Jamie Soward	37	10	78.72
Peter Wallace	3	1	75.00
Totals	93	26	78.15

== Other teams ==
In addition to competing in the National Rugby League, the Panthers also fielded semi-professional teams in the National Youth Competition's 2016 Holden Cup (for players aged under 20) and the New South Wales Rugby League's 2016 Intrust Super Premiership (NSW Cup). The NYC team was coached by Cameron Ciraldo and captained by Oliver Clark, and the NSW Cup team was coached by Steve Georgallis and captained by Zach Dockar-Clay.

== Representative ==
=== Domestic ===
Pos.	Player	Team	Call-up
BE	Leilani Latu	Indigenous All Stars	2016 All Stars Match
BE	Tyrone Peachey	Indigenous All Stars	2016 All Stars Match
BE	Jamie Soward	Indigenous All Stars	2016 All Stars Match
BE	Will Smith	Indigenous All Stars	2016 All Stars Match
BE	Trent Merrin	World All Stars	2016 All Stars Match
PR	Reagan Campbell-Gillard	NSW City	2016 City vs Country Origin
SR	Bryce Cartwright	NSW City	2016 City vs Country Origin
PR	Leilani Latu	NSW City	2016 City vs Country Origin
WG	Josh Mansour	NSW City	2016 City vs Country Origin
BE	Tyrone Peachey	NSW City	2016 City vs Country Origin
WG	Isaah Yeo	NSW Country	2016 City vs Country Origin
18^{1}	Bryce Cartwright	New South Wales	2016 State of Origin
WG	Josh Mansour	New South Wales	2016 State of Origin
FB	Matt Moylan	New South Wales	2016 State of Origin
BE	Matt Moylan	Prime Minister's XIII	2016 Prime Minister's XIII match

=== International ===
Pos.	Player	Team	Call-up
CE	Peta Hiku^{2}	New Zealand	2016 Anzac Test
WG	Dallin Watene-Zelezniak	New Zealand	2016 Anzac Test
HK	Sione Katoa	Tonga	2016 Polynesian Cup
BE	Tupou Sopoaga	Cook Islands	International vs. Lebanon
CE	Waqa Blake^{3}	Fiji	2016 Pacific Test
SR	Viliame Kikau	Fiji	2016 Pacific Test
WG	Josh Mansour	Australia	2016 Four Nations
LK	Trent Merrin	Australia	2016 Four Nations
FB	Matt Moylan	Australia	2016 Four Nations
BE	James Fisher-Harris^{4}	New Zealand	2016 Four Nations
BE	Te Maire Martin	New Zealand	2016 Four Nations
FB	Dallin Watene-Zelezniak	New Zealand	2016 Four Nations

1 – Selected as 18th Man, Cartwright did not play during the series.
2 – Hiku was initially selected to play but was ruled out by injury.
3 – Blake did not play in the match, despite being named in the original squad.
4 – Fisher-Harris was called up to replace injured Simon Mannering.
