= Corey Harawira-Naera =

NZ international rugby league footballer

Corey Harawira Naera
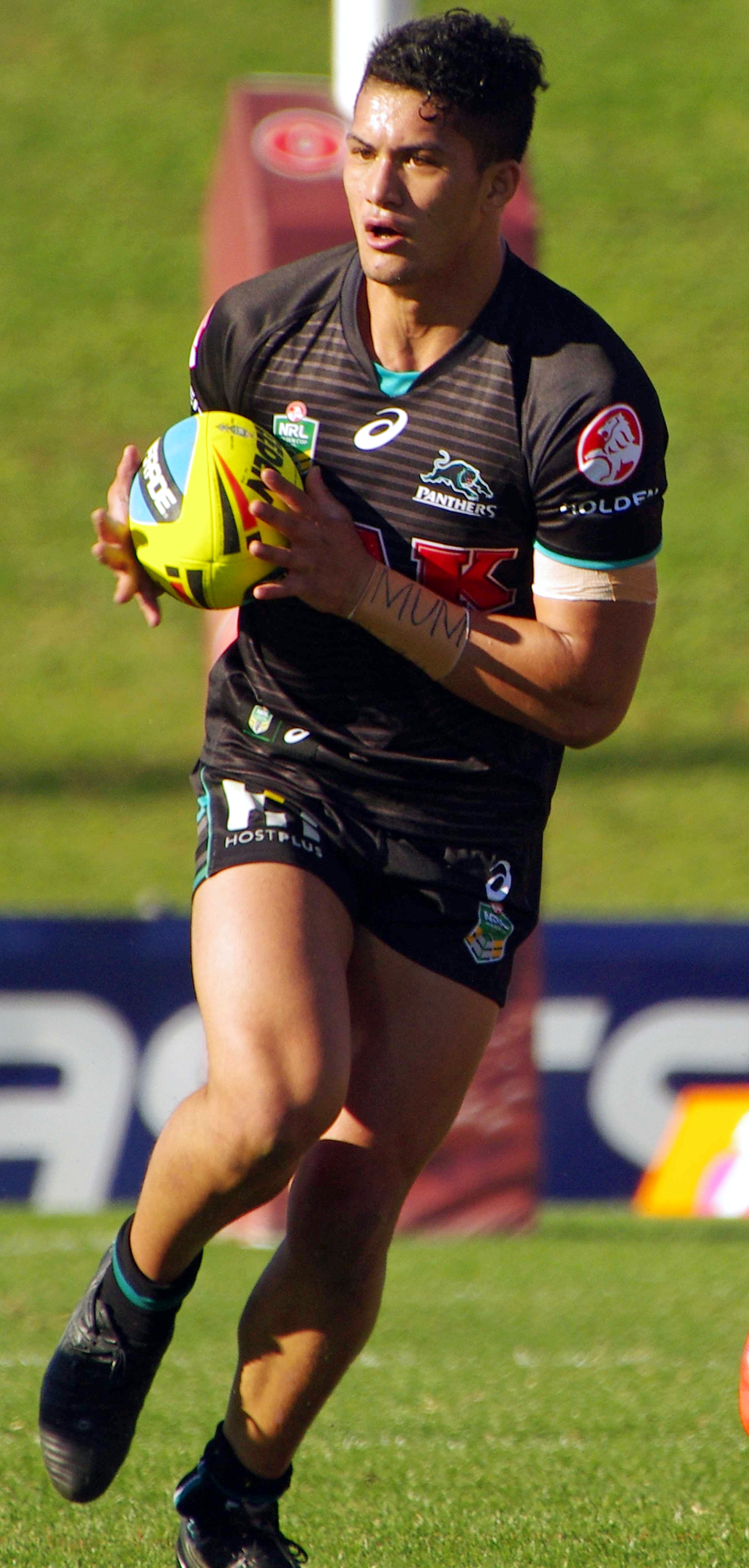

Personal information
- Born: 18 May 1995 (age 31) Auckland, New Zealand
- Height: 188 cm (6 ft 2 in)
- Weight: 105 kg (16 st 7 lb)

Playing information
- Position: Second-row, Lock
Club
| Years | Team | Pld | T | G | FG | P |
|---|---|---|---|---|---|---|
| 2017–18 | Penrith Panthers | 46 | 13 | 0 | 0 | 52 |
| 2019 | Canterbury Bulldogs | 21 | 5 | 0 | 0 | 20 |
| 2020–23 | Canberra Raiders | 56 | 9 | 3 | 0 | 42 |
| | Total | 123 | 27 | 3 | 0 | 114 |
Representative
| Years | Team | Pld | T | G | FG | P |
| 2019–20 | Māori All Stars | 2 | 0 | 0 | 0 | 0 |
| 2019 | New Zealand | 3 | 1 | 0 | 0 | 4 |
- Source: As of 27 May 2023

Corey Harawira-Naera (born 18 May 1995) is a New Zealand professional rugby league footballer who last played as a second-rower or lock for the Canberra Raiders in the National Rugby League (NRL), and the New Zealand Māori and New Zealand at international level.

He previously played for the Penrith Panthers and the Canterbury-Bankstown Bulldogs in the NRL.

== Background ==
Harawira-Naera was born in Auckland, New Zealand, and is of Māori descent.

He grew up in Hokianga alongside James Fisher-Harris before moving down to Auckland to play his junior rugby league for Otaua Valley Warriors. Harawira-Naera was then signed by the Penrith Panthers.

== Playing career ==
=== Early career ===
In 2014 and 2015, Harawira-Naera played for the Penrith Panthers in the National Youth Competition, before graduating to their Intrust Super Premiership NSW team in 2016. In February 2016, he was named in the Panthers' 2016 NRL Auckland Nines squad.

=== 2017 ===
In February 2017, Harawira-Naera was selected in Penrith's 2017 Auckland Nines squad that went on to be runners-up. On 24 March, he made his NRL debut for the Penrith club in round 4 of the 2017 NRL season against the Newcastle Knights, scoring a try in Penrith's 40–0 win. On 27 June, he extended his contract with Penrith to the end of the 2020 season. Harawira-Naera would show good form during the season and became a mainstay in the top 17 with coach Anthony Griffin opting to start him at second-row in most matches over Bryce Cartwright and James Fisher-Harris. Harawira-Naera finished his debut year in the NRL having played in 22 matches and scoring 7 tries for the Penrith club during the season.

=== 2018 ===
In Round 6 against Gold Coast Titans, Harawira-Naera shifted from second-row to the centres to cover the injured Waqa Blake, scoring 2 tries in Penrith's 35–12 win at Penrith Stadium.

On 3 September 2018, the Canterbury-Bankstown Bulldogs announced the signing of Harawira-Naera on a four-year deal. Canterbury CEO Andrew Hill said: "Signing someone of Corey’s calibre and potential is a great coup for Canterbury and comes on the back of a strong finish to our 2018 season", "Dean Pay and his coaching staff have helped develop some talented young players this year and the addition of Corey to the squad will add both quality and strength to our forward pack for next season and beyond".

During the Panthers presentation night, chairman Phil Gould said he personally recruited Harawira-Naera from New Zealand, as he fought back tears as he spoke about the hard-hitting forward. "We got a tip on a couple of young players - James Fisher-Harris and Corey Harawira-Naera," Gould said. "These were two boys who were young and very raw and came over here with nothing more than a dream. "I think their first accommodation was out on top of the horse stalls at Fernhill Equestrian Centre. They lived with the horses and worked on the property. They got up early every morning and went to work and we could see their character straight away." "Those two players mean a lot to me, they'll always be Panthers and they'll always be welcome at this club and I'm only buoyed by the fact that they've both got great deals and can set their families up for life with the deals that they have.

Harawira-Naera finished his last year with the Penrith Panthers with him playing in 24 matches and scoring 6 tries in the 2018 NRL season. On 1 October 2018, Harawira-Naera was named in the New Zealand Kiwis 24-man squad for their tour of England and their test match against Australia. A few days later on 4 October 2018, Harawira-Naera withdrew from the Kiwis squad from a groin injury.

=== 2019 ===
On 15 February 2019, Harawira-Naera represented the Māori All Stars against the Indigenous All Stars in the 2019 All Stars match, playing off the interchange bench in the 34–14 loss at AAMI Park. In Round 1 of the 2019 NRL season, Harawira-Naera made his club debut for the Canterbury-Bankstown Bulldogs against the New Zealand Warriors, playing off the interchange bench in the 40–6 loss at Mt Smart Stadium. In Round 7 against the North Queensland Cowboys, Harawira-Naera starred for Canterbury-Bankstown in a Man of the Match performance, scoring his first and second club tries in the second half and pulled off a try saving tackle on North Queensland forward Gavin Cooper in the 24–12 win at ANZ Stadium.

=== 2020 ===
Upon winning his appeal against Canterbury-Bankstown over his dismissal, Harawira-Naera opted not to stay with the club asking for an immediate release. He signed a 2.5 year deal with the Canberra Raiders effective immediately on 22 July.

He played 11 games for Canberra towards the end of the season including the club's three finals games where they were defeated by Melbourne in the preliminary final.

=== 2021 ===
In round 22 of the 2021 NRL season, he was sent off for an illegal shoulder charge in Canberra's 26–16 loss against Melbourne. On 16 August, he was suspended by the NRL for three matches in relation to the tackle. He made a total of 15 appearances for Canberra in the 2021 NRL season as the club finished 10th on the table after many had expected them to reach the finals and challenge for the premiership.

=== 2022 ===
In round 19 of the 2022 NRL season, he scored two tries for Canberra in a 26–14 victory over the New Zealand Warriors. He played a total of 21 games for Canberra in 2022 as the club finished 8th on the table and qualified for the finals. He played in both finals matches as Canberra were eliminated in the second week by Parramatta.

=== 2023 ===
Harawira-Naera played a total of nine matches for Canberra in the 2023 NRL season as the club finished 8th on the table and qualified for the finals. Harawira-Naera's season ended in round 13 after suffering a seizure mid match. Harawira-Narea was ruled out for the rest of the season, and he revealed he couldn't recall anything before his seizure and only remembered waking up in an ambulance.

=== 2024 ===
During the pre-season Harawira-Naera was stood down from playing and training for an indefinite period after suffering his on field seizure. Harawira-Naera underwent surgery to have an ICD implanted, and he returned to weights training and running prior to Christmas. He did not play at all in the 2024 season.

Harawira-Naera would be allowed to work as an on field trainer for the 2025 season after not receiving clearance to return to the field by club doctors.

=== 2025 ===
On 16 May it was revealed that Harawira-Naera had been cleared to return to Rugby League, more than two years on from his on field seizure and there was no legal precedent to keep him away from the game . In July 2025, Harawira-Naera revealed that he would depart the Raiders at the end of the season and make a move to a different team after the Raiders decided not to clear him for a return to play. It was later reported that Harawira-Naera was prepared to sign a waiver to return to the field but the Raiders rejected it saying that the legalities of doing so would've been catastrophic for him if he was to suffer a career ending injury.

== Statistics ==
| Year | Team | Games | Tries | Goals | Pts |
|---|---|---|---|---|---|
| 2017 | Penrith Panthers | 22 | 7 | | 28 |
| 2018 | Penrith Panthers | 24 | 6 | | 24 |
| 2019 | Canterbury-Bankstown Bulldogs | 21 | 5 | | 20 |
| 2020 | Canberra Raiders | 11 | | | |
| 2021 | Canberra Raiders | 15 | 4 | | 16 |
| 2022 | Canberra Raiders | 21 | 5 | 1 | 22 |
| 2023 | Canberra Raiders | 9 | | 2 | 4 |
| | Totals | 122 | 27 | 3 | 114 |

== Controversy ==
On 10 March 2020, Harawira-Naera and teammate Jayden Okunbor were stood down by Canterbury two days before the start of the 2020 NRL season after it was alleged that while on a pre-season trip to Port Macquarie earlier in March they brought two teenage schoolgirls to the team hotel where sexual activity may have taken place. Okunbor is alleged to have met the girl during a visit to a local school, while Harawira-Naera met one of the girls independent to that visit. Both players were asked to "show cause" why the NRL should not cancel or suspend their registrations as players.

On 11 March 2020, it was announced that because of the two players actions, new major sponsor Rashays had cancelled their $2 million sponsorship with the club. Rashays had signed on to become Canterbury's front of shirt sponsor. Rashays owner Rami Ykmour released a statement saying "It’s a shame two players could wreck it for everyone, It’s disgusting. It's repulsive, to be honest. That’s something else. If they sack them, I would stand by the club and the NRL’s decision".

On 1 April 2020, Harawira-Naera had his contract terminated by Canterbury-Bankstown and was also deregistered by the NRL. Canterbury released a statement saying "The NRL have today deregistered both Jayden Okunbor and Corey Harawira-Naera with immediate effect and as a result their playing contracts with the Bulldogs have been cancelled, The conduct of the two players, on the eve of our final trial match, demonstrated an unacceptable lack of respect for their teammates, their coach and club officials, our hosts in Port Macquarie and fans of the game everywhere".

On 8 April 2020, both players opted to appeal their contract terminations at an NRL Appeals Tribunal (an independent hearing headed by high court judge Ian Callinan AC QC).

On 13 July 2020, the NRL Appeals Tribunal agreed (with the players appeal) that the punishment was too harsh, reversing the decision to deregister both Harawira-Naera and Jayden Okunbor effective immediately. Harawira-Neara received a retrospective 10 game ban (from the date of contract termination), and a $15,000 fine. Jayden Okunbor was retrospectively given a 14-game ban (from the date of contract termination), a $22,500 fine and a course of counselling / community service.

Upon winning his appeal, Harawira-Naaera asked the Canterbury club for a release and signed a 2.5 year contract with the Canberra Raiders.

On 2 February 2021, it was revealed that Harawira-Naera had been pulled over on Christmas Day in 2020 and charged with high-range drink driving. The matter was later passed onto the NRL Integrity Unit. The breach notice proposes Harawira-Naera be suspended for 2 matches and fined $10,000. He must also complete an education program as directed by the NRL.
