= Matt Moylan =

Australia international rugby league football player

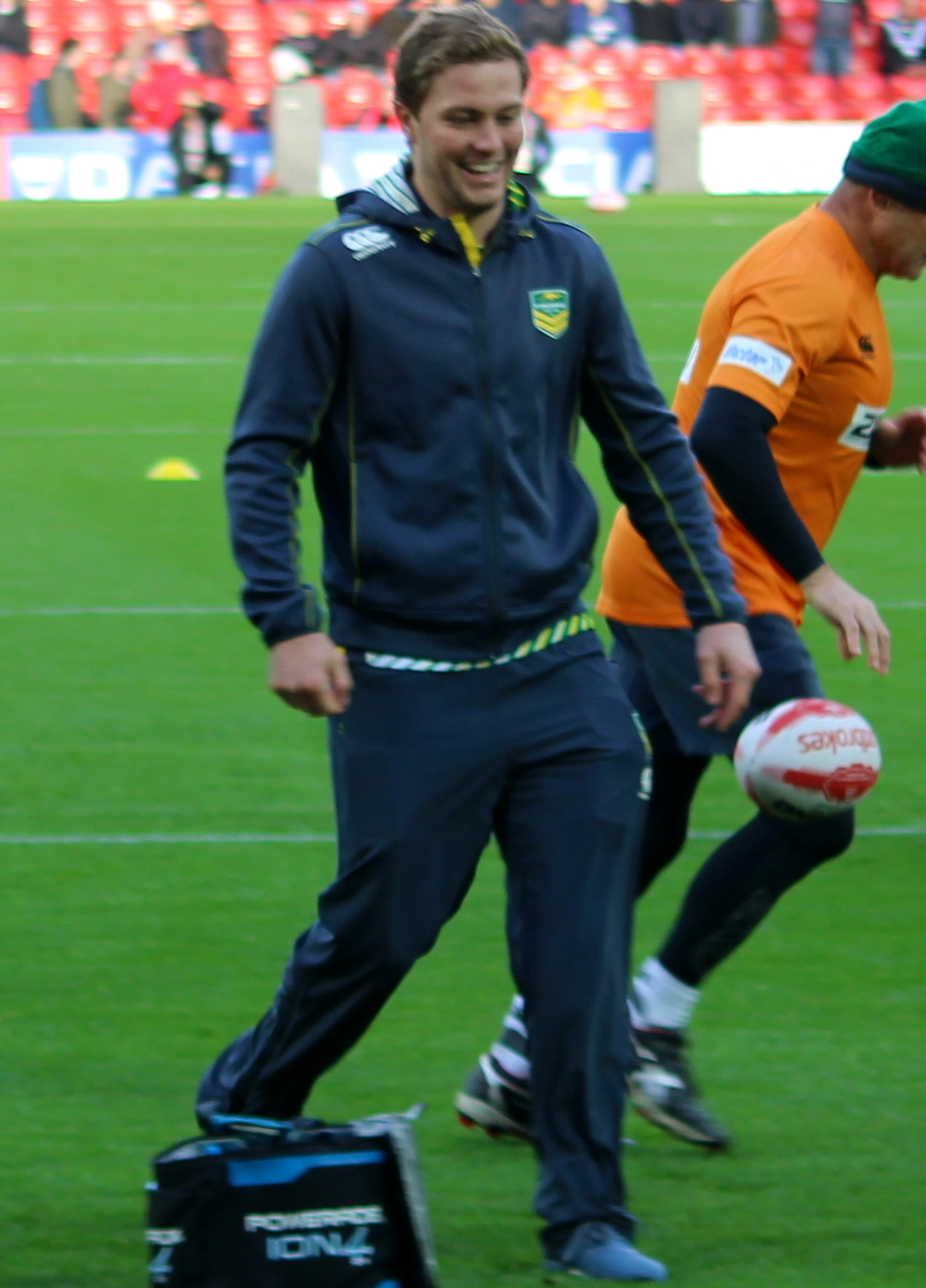

Personal information
- Full name: Matthew Moylan
- Born: 16 June 1991 (age 35) Baulkham Hills, New South Wales, Australia

Playing information
- Height: 185 cm (6 ft 1 in)
- Weight: 90 kg (14 st 2 lb)
- Position: Fullback, Five-eighth
Club
Years	Team	Pld	T	G	FG	P
2013–17	Penrith Panthers	89	26	29	8	170
2018–23	Cronulla Sharks	102	11	4	1	53
2024	Leigh Leopards	26	6	55	0	134
	Total	217	43	88	9	357
Representative
Years	Team	Pld	T	G	FG	P
2012	NSW Residents	1	1	1	0	6
2014–17	NSW City	3	0	3	0	6
2014–16	Prime Minister's XIII	2	0	5	0	10
2015	NRL All Stars	1	0	0	0	0
2016	New South Wales	3	0	0	0	0
2016	Australia	1	0	0	0	0

Matthew Moylan (born 16 June 1991) is a retired Australia international rugby league footballer.

He played for the Penrith Panthers from 2013–17 and captained the club from 2016-17 in the NRL. He played for the Cronulla-Sutherland Sharks from 2018-23. He played for Leigh Leopards in 2024 in the Super League. He made his NRL, Origin and Test debut as a fullback. He made his five-eighth debut in the 2016 State of Origin series and switched to the position for the Panthers in mid-2017. He represented both New South Wales Blues and Australia in 2016. He also played for NSW Residents, NSW City, Prime Minister's XIII and the NRL All Stars.

== Background ==
Moylan was born in Baulkham Hills, New South Wales, Australia.

He played his junior football for the St Clair Comets and St. Patricks before being signed by the Penrith Panthers.

== Playing career ==
=== Early career ===
Moylan played for Penrith's NYC team from 2009 to 2011.

=== 2012 ===
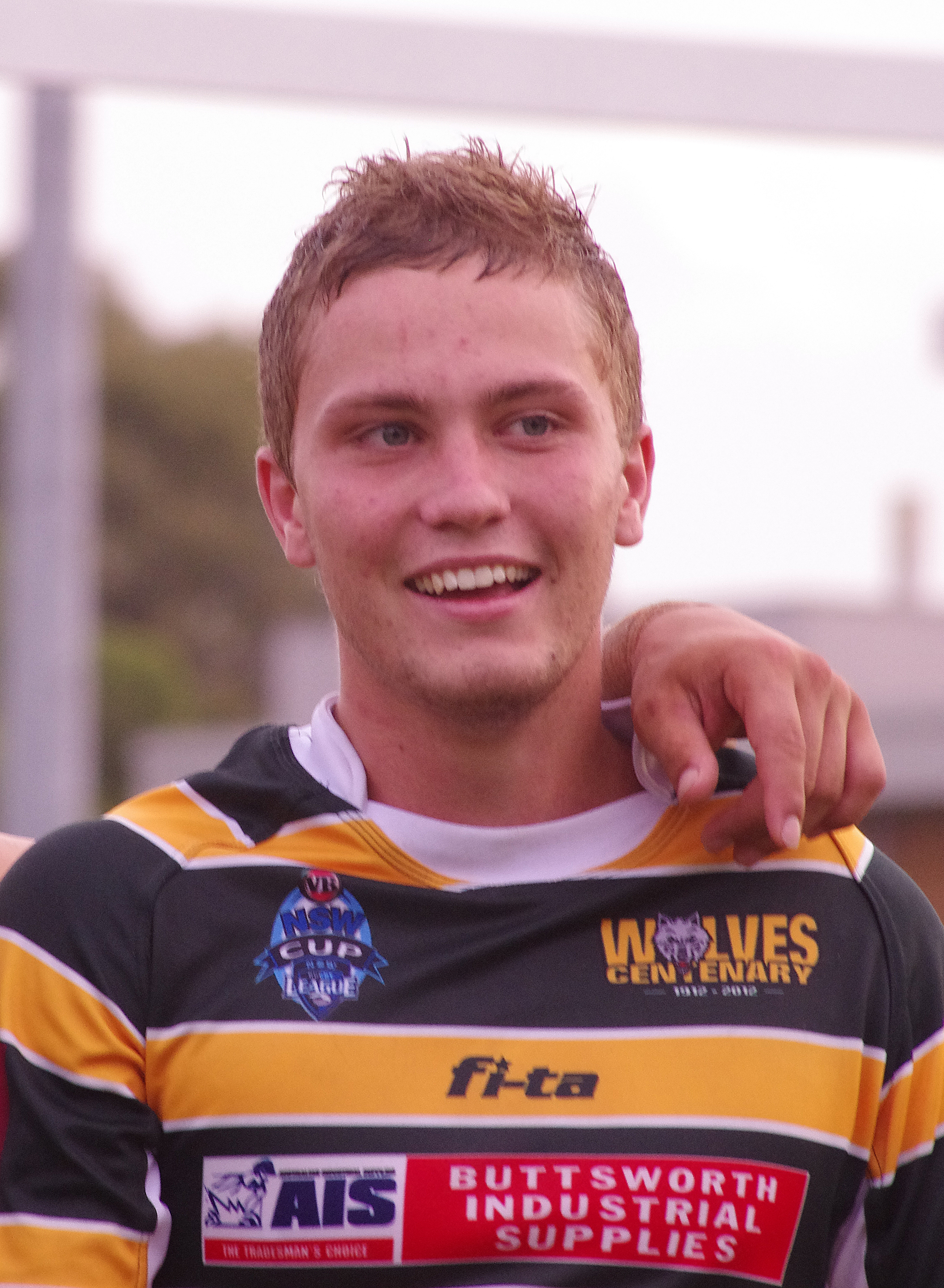
Moylan playing for the Windsor Wolves in 2012

Moylan played for the Windsor Wolves, the NSW Cup feeder team to the Panthers.

=== 2013 ===
In round 7, Moylan made his NRL debut for the Penrith club against the Parramatta Eels in a 44–12 victory at Penrith Stadium. He became Penrith's first-choice fullback. Moylan scored his first try in round 8 against the Sydney Roosters, losing 30–6 at the SFS. He was ruled out of a match in round 13, due to second-tier salary cap issues, but was available for selection the next week due to the injury of fullback Wes Naiqama. Moylan finished his debut year in the NRL with 13 matches, 3 tries and 2 goals. He was named Penrith's Rookie of the Year.

=== 2014 ===
In February 2014, Moylan was selected in Penrith's inaugural 2014 Auckland Nines squad. In round 3, against the Canterbury Bulldogs, Moylan kicked a sideline goal to win the game for Penrith 18–16 at the death when winger Kevin Naiqama scored in the 79th minute to tie the match up at match at 16-all at Penrith Stadium. Moylan was selected to play for the NSW City side in the City vs Country Origin match at Dubbo's Apex Oval. Moylan played at fullback in the 26-all draw. In round 18, against the Brisbane Broncos at Penrith Stadium, he kicked a field goal in the last minute to win the match for the Penrith side, 35–34. In round 23, he repeated the feat by kicking the winning field goal in the 79th minute at Penrith Stadium to beat the North Queensland Cowboys, 23–22. On 9 September 2014, Moylan extended his contract with the Penrith outfit from the end of 2015 until the end of 2017. On 29 September 2014, Moylan was selected in the Australian train on squad. On the same day, he was named as fullback for the Prime Minister's XIII side to play against Papua New Guinea. On 15 October, Moylan was called into the Kangaroos' 2014 Four Nations squad to replace Jarryd Hayne, who had announced that he was leaving rugby league to play American football in the National Football League. Moylan didn't play a match in the series.

=== 2015 ===
On 13 February, Moylan played at fullback for the NRL All Stars against the Indigenous All Stars in the 2015 All Stars match at Cbus Super Stadium, the NRL All Stars losing 6-20.

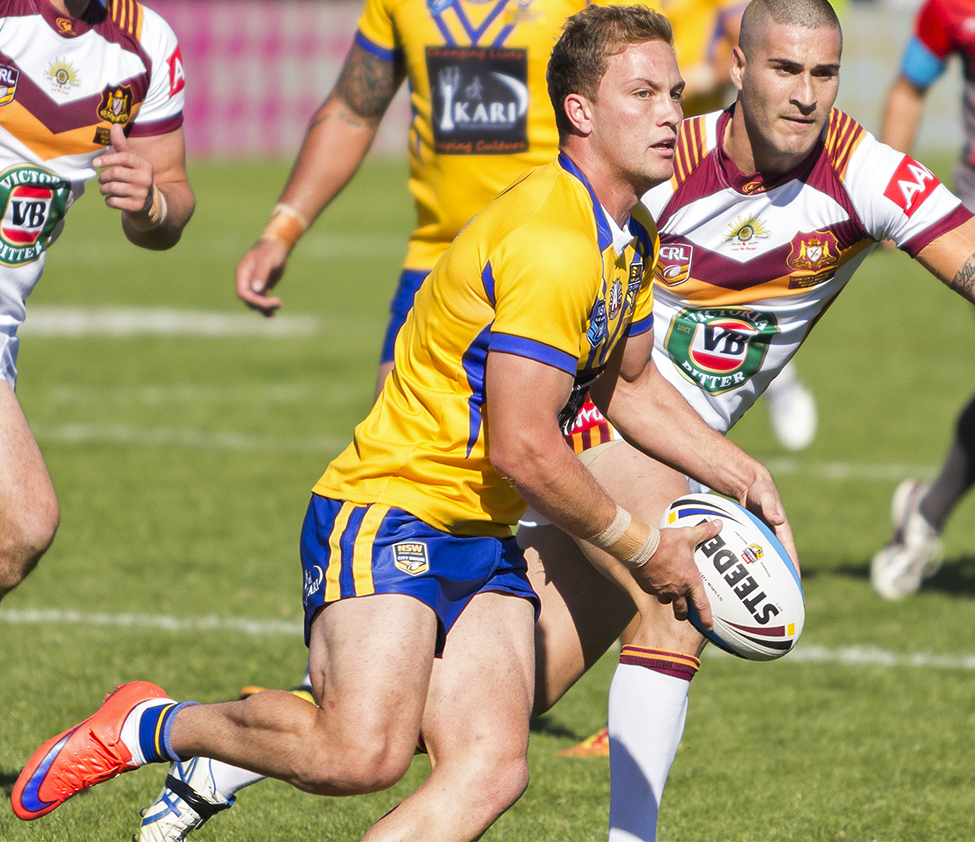
Moylan playing for City in 2015

On 3 May, he played for New South Wales City against New South Wales Country, playing at fullback in the 2015 City vs Country Origin match and kicking 3 goals in City's 22–34 loss at Wagga Wagga. In round 12, against the Parramatta Eels, he suffered a season ending foot injury in Penrith's 20–26 loss at Penrith Stadium. He finished the 2015 season having played in 11 matches, scoring 2 tries, kicking 20 goals and kicking 2 field goals for the Penrith side.

=== 2016 ===
On 13 January, Moylan was named in the emerging New South Wales Blues squad. On 27 January, he was named by incoming coach Anthony Griffin as the new captain of the Penrith club for the 2016 NRL season. In round 5, against the Parramatta Eels, he made his return from injury for the Panthers, making his debut as club captain in the Panthers' last minute 20–18 win at Parramatta Stadium. After showing good form in the early rounds, Moylan was leading the race for the fullback spot for New South Wales facing competition from Wests Tigers James Tedesco and Lachlan Coote from the North Queensland Cowboys but eventually beating them to the starting number 1 jersey. On 1 June 2016, Moylan made his debut for New South Wales against Queensland, playing at fullback in the 4–6 loss at ANZ Stadium. After regaining the fullback spot for game 2, where the Blues lost 16-26 including the 2016 State of Origin series at Suncorp Stadium, Moylan was dropped from the team for James Tedesco. However, halfback Adam Reynolds was ruled out due to a shoulder injury, so Moylan, who performed solidly in the first two matches, was called back into the squad where he started game 3 at five-eighth even though he had not played a NRL match in the position. Moylan featured in all 3 matches for Blues in their 2–1 series loss. On 22 September 2016, Moylan extended his contract with the Penrith side until the end of the 2021 season. Moylan finished off the 2016 NRL season with him playing in 21 matches and scoring 4 tries for Penrith. At the end of the year, Moylan was named in the Australia 2016 Four Nations 24-man squad. Moylan played in one match in the tournament, in the first round against Scotland where he played at fullback in the 54–12 win at Craven Park, Hull.

=== 2017 ===
After Penrith's Round 5 clash against the Melbourne Storm, where they lost 28–6 at AAMI Park, Moylan alongside Waqa Blake and Peta Hiku were dropped to the Panthers NSW Cup team for 1 match after they breached the booze curfew by being out in the Melbourne nightlife into the early hours of the next morning. Moylan played the first half the season playing at fullback before switching to five-eighth where he had success in the position. After being one of the main influences for Penrith to guide themselves into the top 8 after a 7-game winning streak, Moylan was a shock absentee for Penrith's finals campaign after ruling himself out due to personal issues. Moylan finished the 2017 NRL season with him playing in 18 matches and scoring 8 tries for the Penrith club. On 9 November 2017, it was confirmed that Moylan was released from his contract with Penrith to join the Cronulla-Sutherland Sharks in a swap-deal with James Maloney, being signed on for four years. It was rumoured before the swap that Moylan was "disinterested and restless" and was having a feud with coach Anthony Griffin. There is also claims that he didn't turn up to his rehabilitation sessions for his hamstring injury and that he didn't want to captain the team anymore.

=== 2018 ===
In round 1 of the 2018 NRL season, Moylan made his club debut for the Cronulla-Sutherland Sharks against the North Queensland Cowboys, starting at five-eighth in the 20–14 loss at 1300SMILES Stadium. Moylan made a total of 24 appearances for Cronulla in his first season with his new side as the club reached the preliminary final before losing to Melbourne 22–6.

=== 2019 ===
In round 3, Moylan suffered a hamstring injury in Cronulla's 42–16 win over North Queensland ruling him out for six weeks. Moylan returned to the Cronulla side in round 11 for their match against rivals St George which Cronulla won 22–9 at WIN Stadium.

=== 2020 ===
On 1 March, Moylan was ruled out of the first 4–6 weeks of the 2020 NRL season after suffering a calf injury in pre-season training.

=== 2021 ===
Moylan played 15 games for Cronulla in the 2021 NRL season which saw the club narrowly miss the finals by finishing 9th on the table.

=== 2022 ===
Moylan played 24 games in the 2022 NRL season and scored five tries as Cronulla finished second on the table. Moylan played in both finals matches as Cronulla were eliminated in straight sets.

=== 2023 ===
Moylan played a total of 20 matches for Cronulla in the 2023 NRL season as Cronulla finished sixth on the table. On 20 November, Moylan signed a two-year deal to join English side Leigh.

=== 2024 ===
In round 1 of the 2024 Super League season, Moylan made his club debut for Leigh in their 16-8 loss against Huddersfield. In round 5, Moylan scored a try and kicked nine goals in Leigh's 54-4 victory over Hull F.C. Moylan played 24 games for Leigh in the 2024 Super League season which saw the club finish fifth on the table. Moylan played in the clubs semi-final loss to Wigan. He announced his retirement from professional rugby league on 23 October.

== Statistics ==
=== NRL ===
Season	Team	Matches	T	G	GK %	F/G	Pts
2013	Penrith Panthers	13	3	2	66.67%	0	16
2014	Penrith Panthers	26	9	7	53.85%	3	53
2015	Penrith Panthers	11	2	20	71.43%	2	50
2016	Penrith Panthers	21	4	0	0.00%	3	19
2017	Penrith Panthers	18	8	0	—	0	32
2018	Cronulla-Sutherland	24	2	0	—	0	8
2019	Cronulla-Sutherland	11	0	0	—	0	0
2020	Cronulla-Sutherland	8	0	4	100.00%	0	8
2021	Cronulla-Sutherland	15	2	0	—	0	8
2022	Cronulla-Sutherland	24	5	0	—	1	21
2023	Cronulla-Sutherland	20	2				8
2024	Leigh Leopards	18	5	46			112
Career totals		209	42	79	64.71%	9	335

=== All Star ===
Season	Team	Matches	T	G	GK %	F/G	Pts
2015	NRL All Stars	1	0	0	—	0	0
Career totals		1	0	0	—	0	0

=== City vs Country ===
Season	Team	Matches	T	G	GK %	F/G	Pts
2014	NSW City	1	0	0	—	0	0
2015	NSW City	1	0	3/4	75.00%	0	6
2017	NSW City	1	0	0	—	0	0
Career totals		3	0	3/4	75.00%	0	0

=== State of Origin ===
Season	Team	Matches	T	G	GK %	F/G	Pts
2016	New South Wales	3	0	0	—	0	0
Career totals		3	0	0	—	0	0

=== International ===
Season	Team	Matches	T	G	GK %	F/G	Pts
2016	Australia	1	0	0	—	0	0
Career totals		1	0	0	—	0	0
