= Darren Nicholls =

Australian rugby league footballer

Darren "Dezie" Nicholls
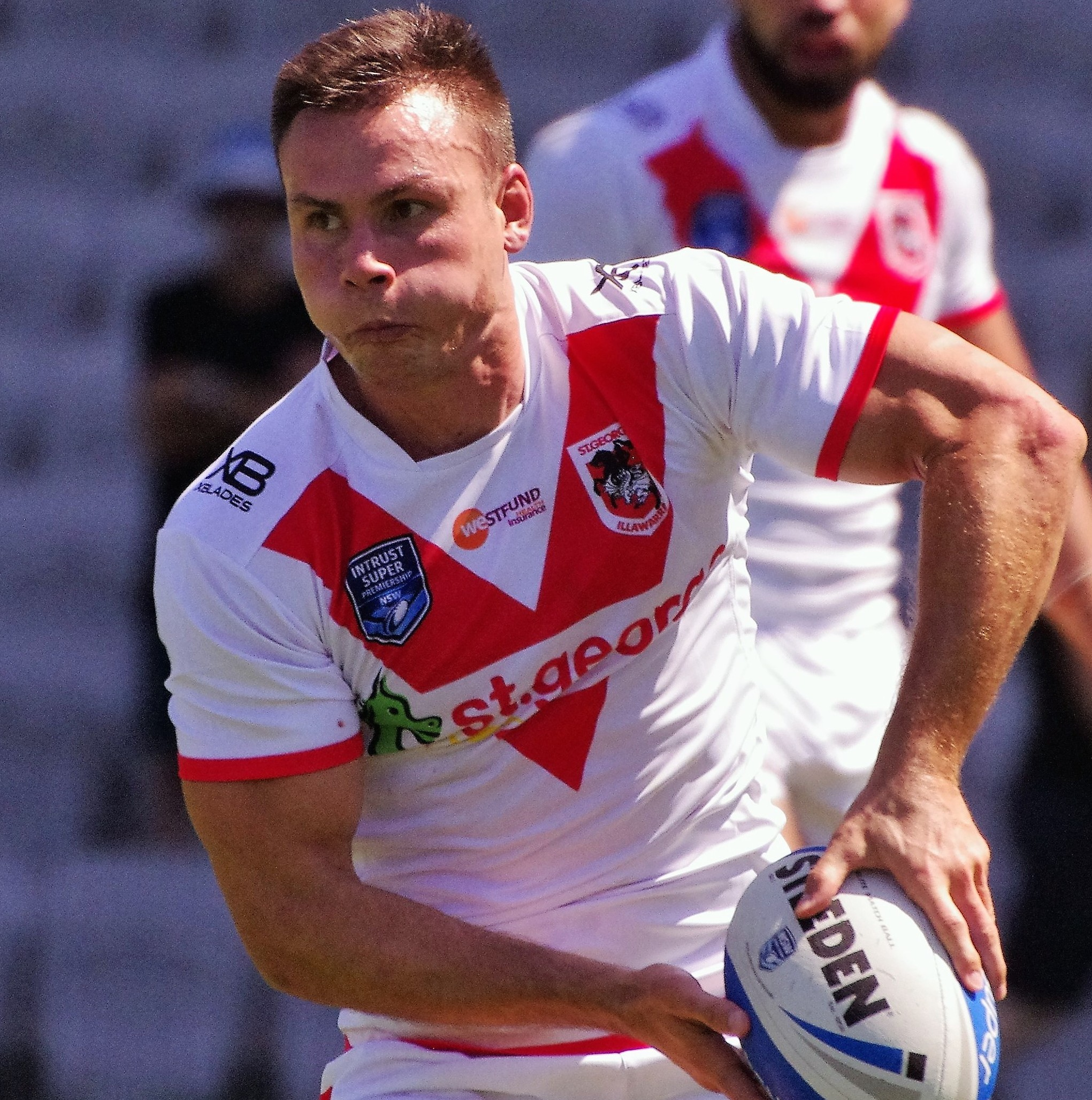

Personal information
- Full name: Darren Nicholls
- Born: 15 April 1989 (age 36); Sydney, New South Wales, Australia
- Height: 182 cm (6 ft 0 in)
- Weight: 89 kg (14 st 0 lb)

Playing information
- Position: Halfback
Club
Years	Team	Pld	T	G	FG	P
2018–19	St. George Illawarra	3	0	0	0	0
Representative
Years	Team	Pld	T	G	FG	P
2015	NSW Residents	1	1	0	0	4
- Source: As of 9 January 2024

Darren Nicholls (born 15 April 1989) is an Australian professional rugby league footballer who played as a halfback for the Brisbane Tigers in the Queensland Cup. He previously played for the St. George Illawarra Dragons in the NRL.

== Background ==
Nicholls was born in Sydney, New South Wales, Australia.

He played junior rugby league for the Holy Cross Rhinos, before being signed by the Wests Tigers.

== Playing career ==
=== Early years ===
From 2008 to 2009, Nicholls played for the Wests Tigers' NYC team, before graduating to their New South Wales Cup team, Balmain Ryde-Eastwood Tigers in 2010. He then spent two years playing in France. In 2012, he played for the Mount Pritchard Mounties.

In 2013, he played for the North Sydney Bears, captaining the side. At the end of the season, he was named captain and five-eighth of the 2013 New South Wales Cup Team of the Year. In 2014, he joined the Wyong Roos. In May 2014, he joined the Brisbane Broncos mid-season on a contract until the end of 2015, playing with their Queensland Cup feeder side, Norths Devils.

In April 2015, he joined the South Sydney Rabbitohs full-time squad mid-season on a contract until the end of 2016, meaning he would again play for North Sydney, the Rabbitohs' New South Wales Cup feeder side. However, his stint at South Sydney was short lived as he rejoined the Broncos ahead of their 2016 pre-season. He played for their other Queensland Cup feeder side, Redcliffe Dolphins throughout the year, earning selection in the Queensland Residents team and finishing the season as the competition's leading point-scorer.

In October 2016, he signed a 1-year contract with the Penrith Panthers starting in 2017. He captained the Panthers' New South Wales Cup side to an NRL State Championship victory over the Papua New Guinea Hunters, after a player of the match performance in the NSW Cup grand final the week prior. In November 2017, he signed a 2-year contract with the St. George Illawarra Dragons starting in 2018.

=== St. George Illawarra ===
In round 17 of the 2018 NRL season, Nicholls made his NRL debut for St. George Illawarra at the age of 29 years and 81 days. He became the second oldest player to ever debut in the modern NRL era after Brian Carney, playing at halfback against the Melbourne Storm in place of Ben Hunt who was called up to the Queensland State of Origin team.

Nicholls spent nearly the entire 2019 season playing for St George Illawarra's reserve grade team in the Canterbury Cup NSW competition. He made two appearances for the first grade team in round 16 against the Melbourne Storm and in round 18 against Penrith, again covering Hunt during the Origin period. Nicholls was part of the St George team in the NSW Cup which won the minor premiership but were defeated by eventual premiers Newtown in the preliminary final. In November 2019, it was announced that Nicholls had been released by the club.

=== Later years ===
In 2020, Nicholls signed with Queensland Cup side Souths Logan Magpies.

Nicholls joined the Brisbane Tigers in the Queensland Cup in 2021 and was named club captain.

Nicholls announced his retirement from playing rugby league at the completion of the 2022 Hostplus Cup season on 22 August 2022.

You can find Darren's Queensland Cup playing stats: 2014-2015: Norths Devils - 16 games 2016: Redcliffe Dolphins - 25 games 2020: Souths Logan Magpies - 1 game 2021-2022: Brisbane Tigers - 36 games
