= Shaun Spence =

Australian rugby league footballer

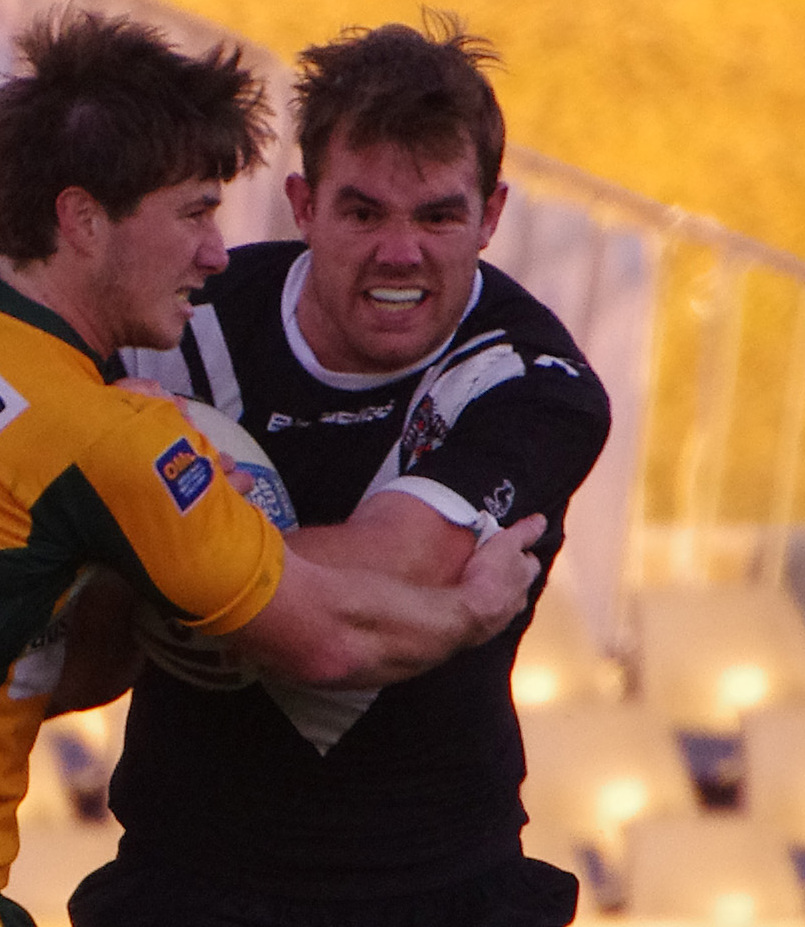

Personal information
- Born: 11 October 1991 (age 35) Griffith, New South Wales, Australia

Playing information
- Height: 189 cm (6 ft 2 in)
- Weight: 106 kg (16 st 10 lb)
- Position: Lock, Prop
Club
Years	Team	Pld	T	G	FG	P
2013	Wests Tigers	9	1	0	0	4

Shaun Spence (born 11 October 1991) is an Australian former professional rugby league footballer. He played for the Wests Tigers in the National Rugby League, playing in the positions of lock and prop.

== Playing career ==
Born in Griffith, New South Wales, Spence played his junior football for the Griffith Black and Whites before being signed by the Wests Tigers. He played for the Tigers' NYC team in 2010 and 2011.

Spence was captaining the Balmain Ryde Eastwood Tigers in 2012 when he suffered a season-ending knee injury. "By the time I got to the sheds, it was the size of two knees and I knew I was in a bit of strife. The specialist surgeon, Dr Simon Tan, said it looked as though a bomb had exploded inside my knee. He made it very clear this was a career threatening injury."

In Round 6 of the 2013 NRL season Spence made his NRL debut for the Tigers against the St. George Illawarra Dragons. He played in nine games throughout the season, scoring one try. He received a number of concussions during the season, losing 70% of his ear drum. In July 2013, Spence signed a 2-year contract with the Penrith Panthers starting in 2014. Coach Mick Potter said, "Disappointing to see him go but happy to see him get an opportunity and earn some reasonable money at another club."

Spence spent two season with the Panthers without playing first grade. In his first season, he was rested after being concussed "a few" times. Although receiving payment from the Panthers, Spence received medical advice to play no further rugby league, facing the risk of permanent brain injury. Panthers CEO Trent Pascoe said, "He could've travelled overseas or played Nintendo because he was still getting contract money. He asked every single person [at the Penrith offices] what needed to be done and how he could learn." Spence said, "I may never have played another NRL game but at 23 I can't even go join a local team and play with a bunch of mates. My whole dream was taken away from me."

Spence officially retired from the NRL at the end of the 2015 season, and was employed by Wests Tigers as a Fan Engagement and Community Manager.
