= Tim Browne =

Australian rugby league footballer

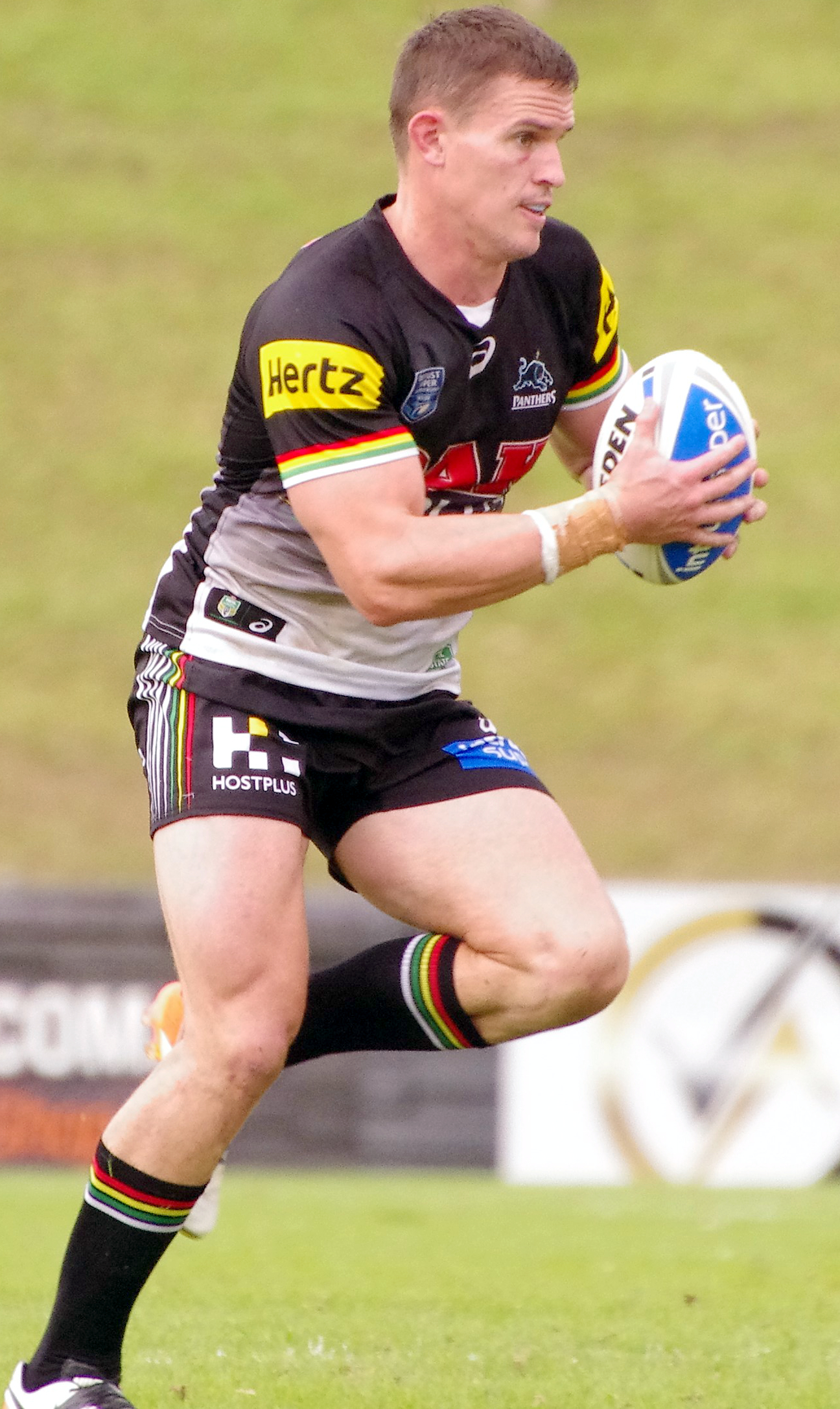

Personal information
- Born: 27 December 1987 (age 38) Penrith, New South Wales, Australia
- Height: 194 cm (6 ft 4 in)
- Weight: 112 kg (17 st 9 lb)

Playing information
- Position: Prop
Club
Years	Team	Pld	T	G	FG	P
2010–16	Canterbury Bulldogs	84	2	3	0	14
2017	Penrith Panthers	19	0	0	0	0
	Total	103	2	3	0	14
- Source: As of 17 February 2018

Tim Browne (born 27 December 1987) is an Australian former professional rugby league footballer who last played for the Penrith Panthers in the National Rugby League. He played as a prop. He previously played for the Canterbury-Bankstown Bulldogs

== Background ==
Born in Penrith, New South Wales, Browne played his junior football for the Raymond Terrace Roosters. He missed selection for the Newcastle Knights' S. G. Ball Cup squad in 2006, but returned to youth club football with the South Sydney Rabbitohs in the Jersey Flegg Cup at age 19. Browne later signed with the Manly Warringah Sea Eagles.

== Playing career ==
=== Early career ===
In 2009, Browne played for Manly's Queensland Cup team, the Sunshine Coast Sea Eagles. He played in their 2009 Queensland Cup Grand Final win over the Northern Pride RLFC.

=== Canterbury-Bankstown Bulldogs ===
Browne joined the Canterbury-Bankstown Bulldogs in 2010. He made his NRL debut in round 5 against the New Zealand Warriors. On 7 July 2010, he played for the New South Wales Residents against the Queensland Residents. On 9 September 2010, he was named on the interchange bench in the 2010 New South Wales Cup Team of the Year. On 3 October 2010, he played in Canterbury-Bankstown's 2010 New South Wales Cup Grand Final win over the Windsor Wolves.

On 2 October 2011, Browne played in Canterbury-Bankstown's 2011 New South Wales Cup Grand Final win over the Auckland Vulcans

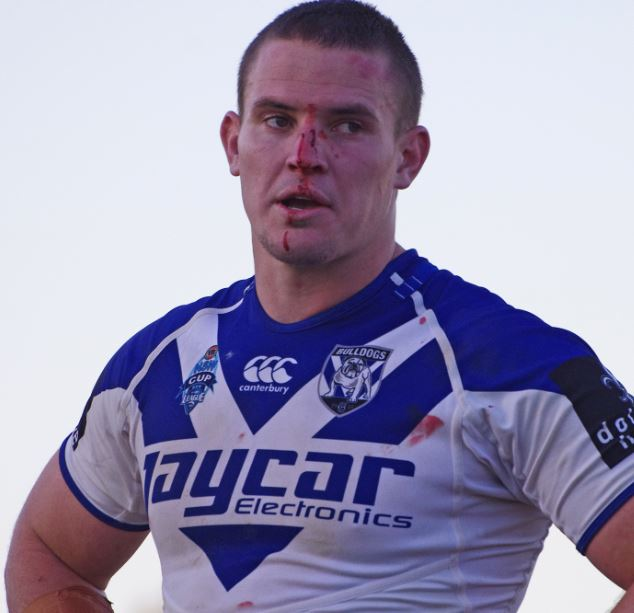
Browne playing for the Bulldogs in 2013

Browne was named in Canterbury-Bankstown's squad for the 2014 NRL Auckland Nines.

On 24 July 2014, Browne extended his contract with Canterbury-Bankstown from the end of 2015 to the end of 2016.

On 31 January and 1 February 2015, Browne played for Canterbury-Bankstown in the 2015 NRL Auckland Nines.

Browne was named in Canterbury-Bankstown's 2016 NRL Auckland Nines squad.

=== Penrith Panthers ===
Browne signed a three-year contract with the Penrith Panthers starting in 2017. In 2018, Browne suffered the career-ending bowel injury after being hit in a heavy tackle while playing for the Penrith reserve grade side. Browne needed to be rushed into emergency surgery where damage to his bowel, spleen, and kidneys was repaired. He remained in intensive care in Nepean Hospital for two days. Following the injury, Browne decided to retire from rugby league.

== Post playing ==
Following his retirement from the NRL, In 2017 Browne founded LERLA a training academy for rugby league. Browne's academy focuses on giving players who miss selection for representative teams to have another pathway choice and remain passionate while doing so.
