= Sitaleki Akauola =

Tonga international rugby league footballer

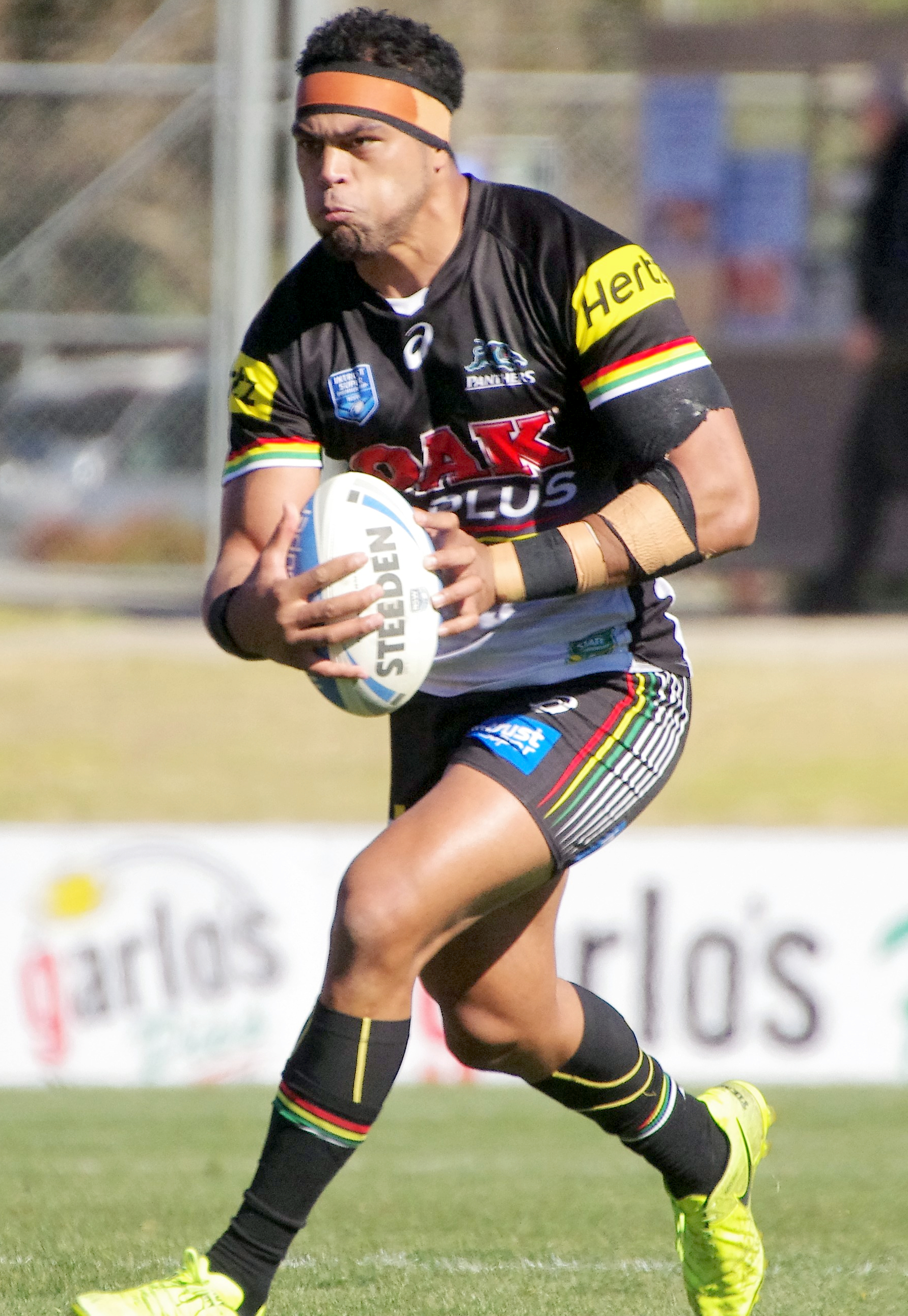

Personal information
- Full name: Sitaleki-Moala Akau'ola
- Born: 7 April 1992 (age 34) Manurewa, New Zealand
- Height: 6 ft 4 in (1.92 m)
- Weight: 16 st 10 lb (106 kg)

Playing information
- Position: Prop, Second-row, Centre
Club
Years	Team	Pld	T	G	FG	P
2013–15	Wests Tigers	11	1	0	0	4
2016–17	Penrith Panthers	21	0	0	0	0
2018–21	Warrington Wolves	68	6	0	0	24
2019(loan)	→ Rochdale Hornets	4	1	0	0	4
2022	Salford Red Devils	19	3	0	0	8
2023–24	Toulouse Olympique	30	4	0	0	16
2025	Featherstone Rovers	16	4	0	0	0
	Total	169	19	0	0	56
Representative
Years	Team	Pld	T	G	FG	P
2014	Tonga	1	0	0	0	0
- Source: As of 17 November 2024

Sitaleki Akauola (born 7 April 1992) is a Tongan international rugby league footballer who last played as a prop for Featherstone Rovers in the Championship.

He previously played for the Wests Tigers and the Penrith Panthers in the NRL. Akauola has also played for Warrington Wolves and Salford Red Devils in the Super League, spending time on loan from Warrington at Rochdale Hornets, and at Toulouse Olympique in the Championship.

== Background ==
Akauola was born in Manurewa, New Zealand, to parents Siupeli and Christina.

He played his junior rugby league for the Manurewa Marlins, and was in the New Zealand Warriors junior system before being signed by the Wests Tigers.

== Playing career ==
=== Wests Tigers ===
In 2012, Akauola played for the Wests Tigers' NYC team. "The Auckland Rugby League from New Zealand got me a trial with the Tigers out in Campbelltown. Two weeks after that I had a trial with NYC," he said. He played from the bench and set up two tries as the Wests Tigers won the 2012 NYC Grand Final.

In Round 5 of the 2013 NRL season, Akauola made his NRL debut for the Wests Tigers against the Melbourne Storm. It would be his only appearance for the season.

On 29 July 2014, Akauola re-signed with the Wests Tigers on a two-year contract. Mid-season, he played a string of games from the bench and in the second row. Towards the end of the season, he played four games on the wing, showing his versatility.

=== Penrith Panthers ===
Akauola signed a contract with the Penrith Panthers in September 2015, after not playing any first grade games with the Tigers that year.

In 2017, Akauola featured in both the Penrith NRL and NSW Cup squads. Akauola was a part of Penrith's 2017 NSW Cup Championship team, and the 2017 State Championship team, helping defeat the Wyong Roos and Papua New Guinea Hunters respectively.

=== Warrington Wolves ===
In August 2017, Akauola signed a two-year contract with the Warrington Wolves starting in 2018.

He played in the 2019 Challenge Cup Final victory over St. Helens at Wembley Stadium.

=== Salford Red Devils ===
On 23 October 2021, it was reported that he had signed for Salford Red Devils in the Super League.

=== Featherstone Rovers ===
On 17 November 2024, it was reported that he had signed for Featherstone in the RFL Championship.
