= Trent Merrin =

Australian rugby league footballer (born 1989)

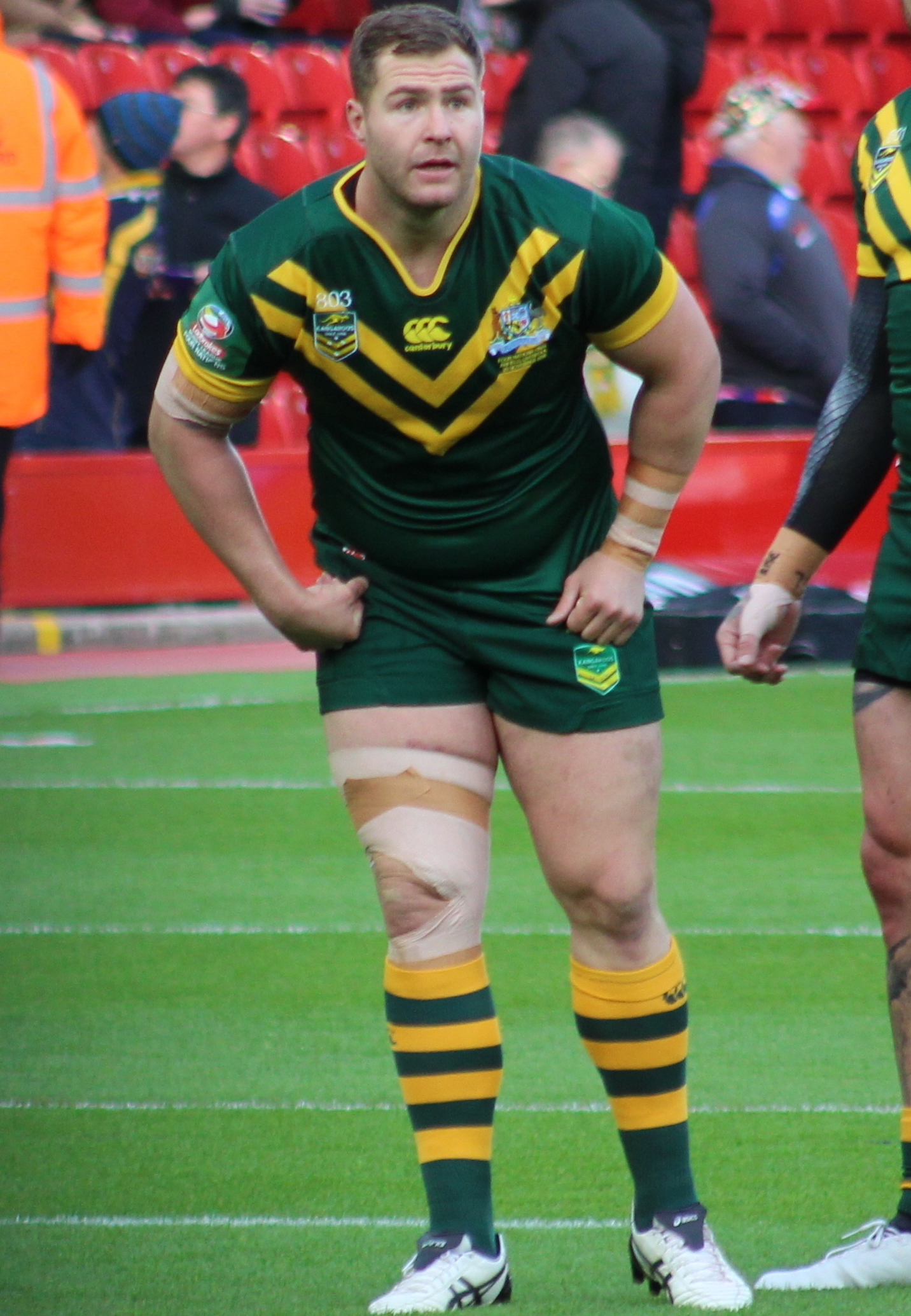

Personal information
- Born: 7 October 1989 (age 37) Sydney, New South Wales, Australia
- Height: 181 cm (5 ft 11 in)
- Weight: 98 kg (15 st 6 lb)

Playing information
- Position: Lock, Prop
Club
Years	Team	Pld	T	G	FG	P
2009–15	St. George Illawarra	135	12	0	0	48
2016–18	Penrith Panthers	72	8	0	0	32
2019	Leeds Rhinos	28	4	0	0	16
2020–21	St. George Illawarra	18	1	0	0	4
	Total	253	25	0	0	100
Representative
Years	Team	Pld	T	G	FG	P
2011–13	NSW Country	3	0	0	0	0
2011–15	New South Wales	13	1	0	0	4
2015–16	NRL All Stars	2	0	0	0	0
2015–17	Australia	7	1	0	0	4
2015	Prime Minister's XIII	1	0	0	0	0
- Source: As of 20 April 2021

Trent Merrin (born 7 October 1989) is an Australian former professional rugby league footballer who played as a lock, prop and second-row forward for most of his playing career in the NRL.

He played for the St. George Illawarra Dragons, with whom he won the 2010 NRL Grand Final, and the Penrith Panthers in the National Rugby League. He also spent a season with the Leeds Rhinos in the Super League. Merrin has also played at representative level for NSW Country, New South Wales, Australia, NRL All Stars and the Prime Minister's XIII sides.

== Background ==
Merrin was born in Sydney, New South Wales, Australia. Merrin originally played junior rugby league with Marrickville RSL while living in Sydenham. Merrin then moved with his family in his early teens from Sydney to the Illawarra. He then played rugby league with the Port Kembla Blacks and the Shellharbour Sharks. Merrin claims another Shellharbour legend, Australian representative Luke Bailey, was "one of [his] idols growing up".

== Playing career ==
In 2008, Merrin played for St. George Illawarra under-20s team in the Toyota Cup, scoring two tries for the season. He was selected as St. George Illawarra's Toyota Cup Player of the Year in 2008.

In 2009, he was selected to play first grade for St. George Illawarra, being chosen on the interchange bench. He made his first grade debut for the club in round 12 of the 2009 NRL season against Penrith at WIN Stadium. He made three appearances in his debut season for St. George Illawarra as the club won the Minor Premiership but lost both matches in the finals series.

He was a prominent squad member of the 2010 premiership-winning St. George Illawarra team, and came from the bench to play in the 2010 NRL Grand Final. In May 2011, he was selected on the bench for New South Wales for game 1 of the 2011 State of Origin series. He was selected for the second match but was then dropped for the third. On 2 March 2015, Merrin signed a five-year contract with the Penrith Panthers, starting in 2016.

On 15 September 2015, it was announced that Merrin would captain a representative team for the first time. On 26 September 2015, he led the Prime Minister's XIII in their 2015 clash with Papua New Guinea.

Merrin was a part of the Penrith sides which made the finals series in 2016, 2017 and 2018 bowing out at the second week on each occasion.

After departing Penrith, Merrin signed a contract to join English Super League team Leeds. After just one season with Leeds, it was announced that Merrin was returning to Australia on compassionate grounds. On 29 November 2019 it was revealed that Merrin had signed a two-year deal with St. George Illawarra.

On 21 April 2021, Merrin announced his retirement from rugby league effective immediately.

== Personal life ==
Merrin was engaged to world-class surfer Sally Fitzgibbons.

Merrin was in a long-term relationship with Jessica Watson and the couple had their first son in March 2020 and their second son in November 2021.

On 4 November 2025, it was reported that Merrin had been arrested and charged by police in New South Wales due to his alleged theft of cryptocurrency.

On 3 November 2026, it was reported that Merrin had been arrested and charged by police in New South Wales due to his alleged involvement in a peptide operation.
