= Tupou Sopoaga =

Former Cook Islands international rugby league footballer

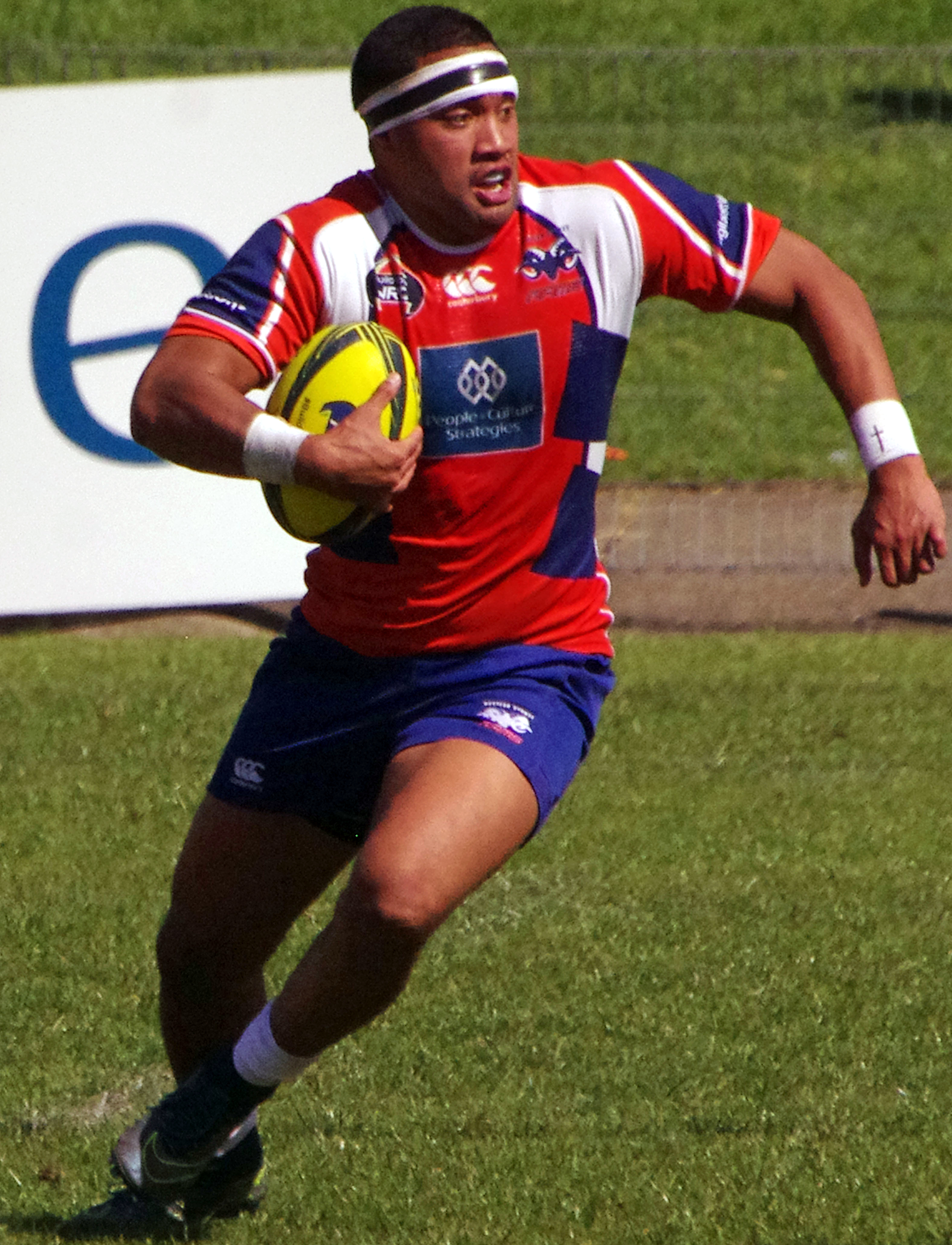

Personal information
- Born: 5 June 1992 (age 34) Wellington, New Zealand
- Height: 185 cm (6 ft 1 in)
- Weight: 100 kg (15 st 10 lb)

Playing information

Rugby league
- Position: Second-row, Lock
Club
Years	Team	Pld	T	G	FG	P
2013–14	Cronulla Sharks	20	0	0	0	0
2015	Penrith Panthers	5	0	0	0	0
	Total	25	0	0	0	0
Representative
Years	Team	Pld	T	G	FG	P
2013–16	Cook Islands	3	0	0	0	0

Rugby union
- Position: Flanker
Club
Years	Team	Pld	T	G	FG	P
2016	Western Sydney Rams	7	0	0	0	0
2017	Highlanders	1	0	0	0	0
2017–	Southland	10	0	0	0	0
	Total	18	0	0	0	0
- Source: As of 30 September 2016

Tupou Sopoaga (born 5 June 1992) is a New Zealand professional rugby union footballer who currently plays for the Southland Stags in the Mitre 10 Cup. He previously played rugby league for the Cronulla-Sutherland Sharks and the Penrith Panthers of the National Rugby League. A Cook Islands international representative, Sopoaga primarily played second-row and lock.

== Early years ==
Born in Wellington, New Zealand, Sopoaga is of Cook Islander and Samoan descent. He is the younger brother of New Zealand rugby union representative Lima, and cousin of former Cronulla and Cook Islands teammate, Tinirau Arona. Sopoaga played his junior rugby league for the Petone Panthers, and was selected to play for the New Zealand schoolboys rugby union team in 2010 while attending Wellington College. He was signed by the Canterbury-Bankstown Bulldogs and played for their NYC team in 2011 and 2012. On 4 October 2012, Sopoaga signed a 2-year contract with the Cronulla-Sutherland Sharks starting in 2013. On 13 October 2012, Sopoaga played for the Junior Kiwis.

== Professional playing career ==
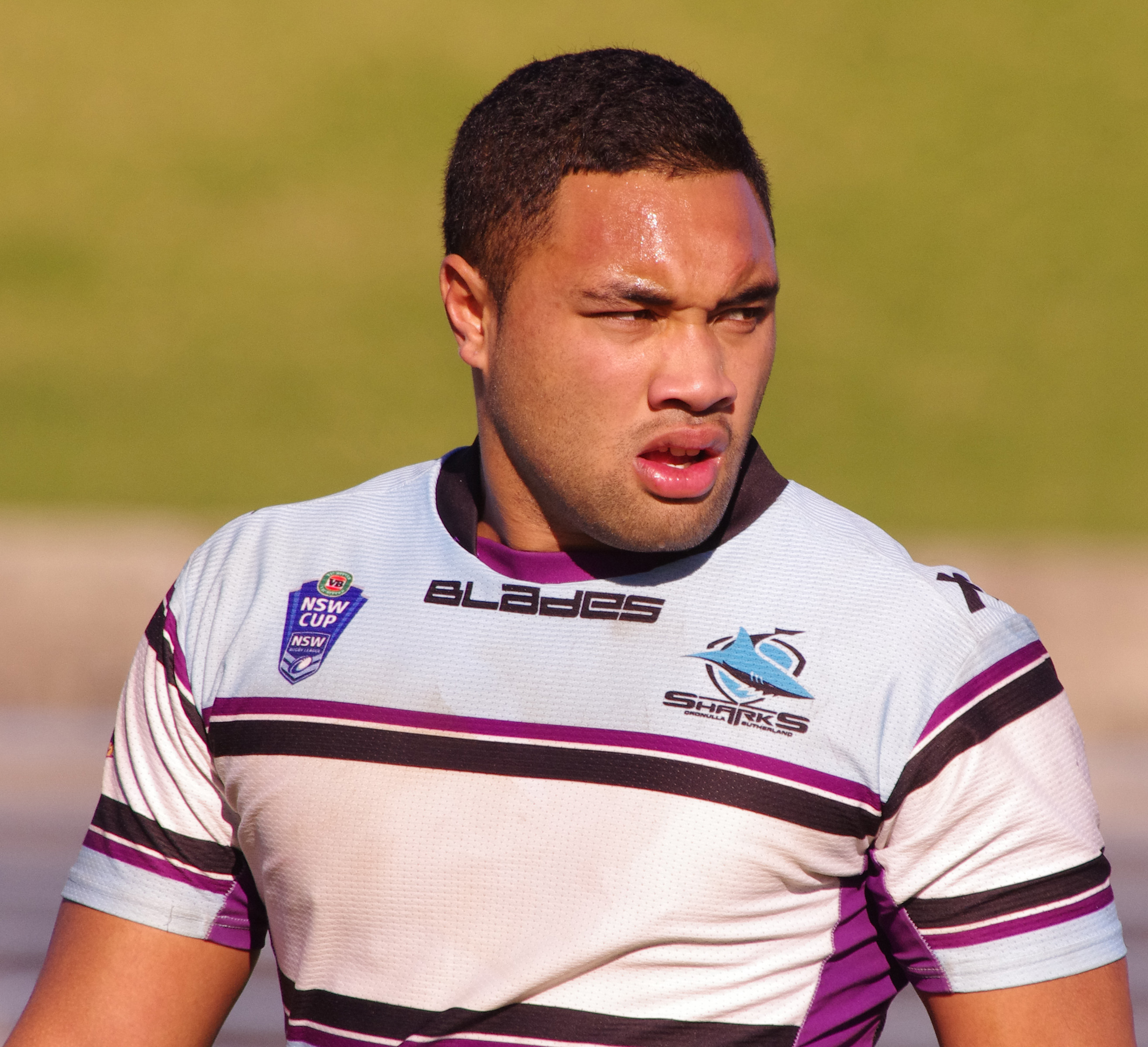
Sopoaga playing for the Sharks in 2013

=== 2013 ===
Sopoaga played for the Cronulla-Sutherland Sharks' NSW Cup team throughout 2013. He was made his NRL debut for the Sharks on 9 September in their round 26 match against the Canberra Raiders at Canberra Stadium. On 22 September, Sopoaga was named at second-row in the 2013 New South Wales Cup Team of the Year. Sopoaga represented the Cook Islands at the 2013 World Cup, playing in two matches, against the United States and Wales on 30 October and 10 November respectively.

=== 2014 ===
In February 2014, Sopoaga was selected in the Sharks' inaugural 2014 Auckland Nines squad. Sopoaga finished the Sharks 2014 season with him playing in 15 matches. On 11 November 2014, Sopoaga signed a 2-year contract with the Penrith Panthers starting in 2015.

=== 2015 ===
On 24 January 2015, Sopoaga was named in the Panthers 2015 Auckland Nines squad. On 8 August 2015, he made his Panthers debut in Round 22 against the Parramatta Eels. On 25 September, Sopoaga was named in the Cook Islands' train-on squad for their 2017 World Cup qualification match against Tonga on 17 October, but chose not play in the game.

=== 2016 ===
Sopoaga captained the Cook Islands in their 30-20 win over Lebanon on 8 May. After receiving no NRL game time from the Panthers in 2016, Sopoaga began playing for rugby union club the Western Sydney Rams of the National Rugby Championship in late 2016.

=== 2017 ===
Sopoaga returned home to New Zealand to continue playing rugby union. He signed with the Southland province where all three of his brothers play. He also achieved the rare feat of debuting for the Highlanders before playing first class rugby in New Zealand as an injury crisis struck their loose forward stocks.

=== 2021 ===
Sopoaga captained the Cook Islands Rugby Union Team in their three tests during the year and also the World Cup Qualifier against Ikale Tahi Tonga. Through this, Tupou become a dual international captaining both Rugby League and Rugby Union. Throughout the year he played for Petone Rugby Club in there premier 1st grade side, playing flanker and number 8 mentoring a young Peter Lakai
