= Waqa Blake =

Fiji international rugby league footballer

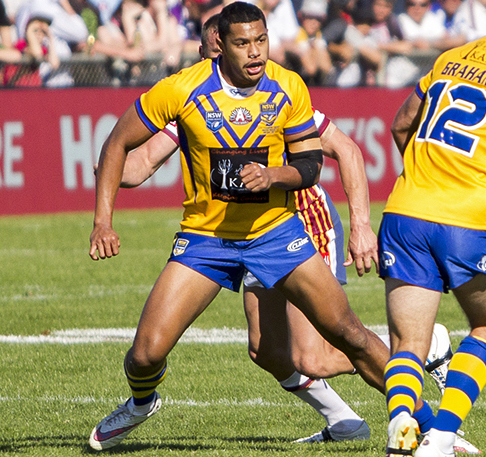

Personal information
- Born: 26 October 1994 (age 32) Lautoka, Viti Levu, Fiji
- Height: 6 ft 3 in (1.90 m)
- Weight: 15 st 6 lb (98 kg)

Playing information
- Position: Centre, Wing
Club
Years	Team	Pld	T	G	FG	P
2015–19	Penrith Panthers	88	34	0	0	136
2019–23	Parramatta Eels	77	28	0	0	112
2024	St Helens	24	11	0	0	44
2025–	Bradford Bulls	52	25	1	0	102
	Total	241	98	1	0	394
Representative
Years	Team	Pld	T	G	FG	P
2015	City Origin	1	0	0	0	0
2017–	Fiji	10	4	0	0	16
2019–	Fiji 9s	2	0	0	0	0
- Source: As of 22 November 2026

Waqa Blake (born 26 October 1994) is a Fijian professional rugby league footballer who plays as a centre and wing for the Bradford Bulls in the Super League and Fiji at international level.

He previously played for the Penrith Panthers and the Parramatta Eels in the National Rugby League and New South Wales City.

== Background ==
Blake was born in Lautoka, Fiji, Blake moved to Sydney, New South Wales, Australia as a 9-year-old. Initially a rugby union player, Blake got introduced to rugby league by accident as his mother enrolled him in the wrong code.

He played his junior football for the Brighton Seagulls. Blake then moved to Perth and played for Joondalup Giants in the Perth Rugby League competition before making the Perth Pirates S. G. Ball Cup representative team. At the end of 2012, after being spotted playing for the Pirates, Blake was signed by the Penrith Panthers.

== Playing career ==
=== 2013 ===
Blake plays for a NYC team. Blake played in the Penrith club's 2013 NYC Grand Final against the New Zealand Warriors at centre, scoring a try in Penrith's 42–30 win.

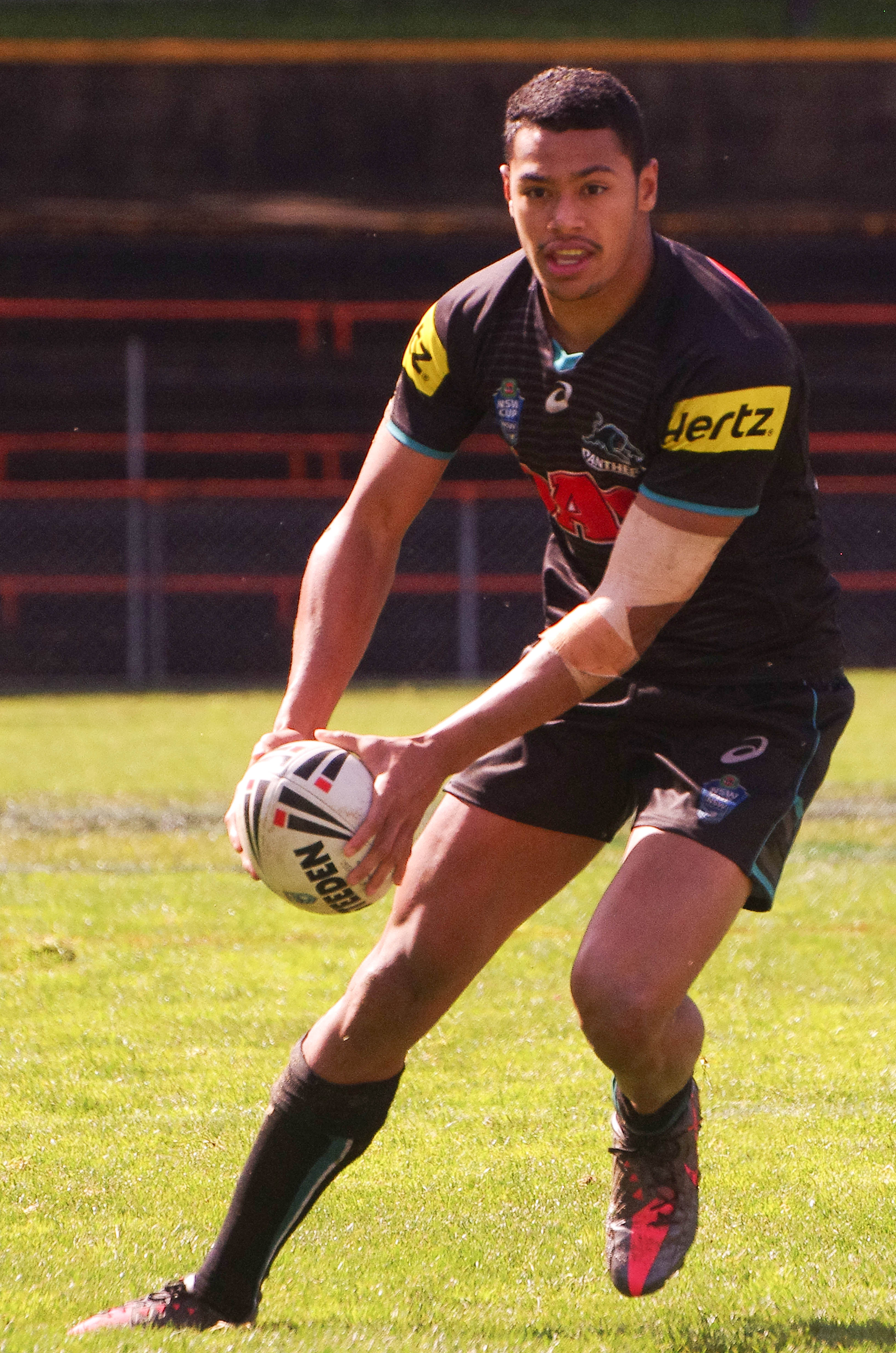
Blake playing for the Panthers

=== 2014 ===
In May 2014, Blake was named on the interchange bench for the Fiji international team for the Pacific Test against Samoa but was later replaced by Petero Civoniceva.

In the second half of the 2014 season, Blake moved on to Penrith's New South Wales Cup team, later earning selection in the New South Wales Residents team at centre in the 24–16 loss against Queensland Residents at Suncorp Stadium.

On 28 September 2014, Blake played at centre in Penrith's 2014 New South Wales Cup Grand Final against the Newcastle Knights and scored a try in the club's 48–12 win. On 5 October 2014, Blake scored a try in the Penrith club's 32–28 defeat by the Northern Pride in the 2014 NRL State Championship.

=== 2015 ===
On 26 February 2015, Blake extended his contract with Penrith from the end of 2016 to the end of 2017. In Round 5 of the 2015 NRL season, Blake made his NRL debut for the Penrith Panthers against the North Queensland Cowboys at centre in Penrith's 30–10 loss at Penrith Stadium. In Blake's next match in Round 6 against the Manly-Warringah Sea Eagles, Blake scored his first NRL career try in the Penrith club's 22–12 win at Penrith Stadium. On 3 May 2015, Blake played for New South Wales City against New South Wales Country, playing at centre in City's 34–22 loss. He finished off his debut year in the NRL having played in 18 matches and scoring 5 tries for the Panthers.

=== 2016 ===
In February 2016, Blake was named in Penrith's 2016 NRL Auckland Nines squad. After New Zealand international representatives and usual backline starters Peta Hiku and Dean Whare suffered season ending knee injuries, Blake made the right centre position of his own, having some blockbusting performances in the late rounds of the season during the Panthers charge into the finals, a great transformation after he explained that he returned to pre-season training 12 kilograms overweight and coach Anthony Griffin mentioning to him that "if you want to play in the outside backs, you need to trim down, otherwise you'll be playing in the forwards". Blake enjoyed his 2016 NRL season with him playing with playing in 21 matches and scoring 8 tries for the Penrith club. On 14 November 2016, Blake extended his contract with Penrith to the end of the 2019 NRL season.

=== 2017 ===
In February 2017, Blake was named in Penrith's runners-up 2017 NRL Auckland Nines squad where he was named in the Team of the Tournament. After the Penrith club's Round 5 clash against the Melbourne Storm, where they lost 28–6 at AAMI Park, Blake alongside Panthers captain Matt Moylan and Peta Hiku were dropped to Penrith's NSW Cup team for 1 match after they breached the booze curfew by being out in the Melbourne nightlife into the early hours of the next morning. On 6 May 2017, Blake made his international debut for Fiji against Tonga, playing at centre in the 26–24 loss at Campbelltown Stadium. In Round 26 against the Manly-Warringah Sea Eagles, Blake suffered a season-ending shoulder injury during the Panthers 28–12 loss at Brookvale Oval, unfortunately resulting him of missing the finals series and representing Fiji for the 2017 Rugby League World Cup. Blake finished the 2017 NRL season with him playing in 23 matches and scoring 7 tries for the Panthers.

=== 2018 ===
In Round 1 against cross-city rivals, the Parramatta Eels, Blake started the 2018 season with a bang, scoring two tries for Penrith as they came back from a 14–0 deficit to achieve a 24–14 victory at Penrith Stadium. As Blake showed great form in the early rounds, unfortunately in Round 5 against the Parramatta Eels, who the Penrith clubplayed against a month earlier, Blake suffered a high-grade syndesmosis injury in his right ankle in late in second half as the Panthers walked away with a close 12–6 win at ANZ Stadium. Blake was set to miss four rounds but unfortunately was ruled out for longer. Blake finally made his return for Penrith in Round 17 against the New Zealand Warriors, scoring a try in the 36–4 upset win at Penrith Stadium. Blake finished the 2018 NRL season with him being Penrith's highest tryscorer with 12 tries in 15 matches.

=== 2019 ===
Blake started the 2019 NRL season as one of Penrith's first choice centres. Blake would play the first 10 games of the season for Penrith as the club struggled on the field winning only 2 of their first 9 matches which left the side last on the table. Blake's final game for Penrith was in Round 11 against Parramatta at the new Western Sydney Stadium which Penrith won 16–10. The following week, it was revealed that Blake would be ruled out for 10 weeks with a knee injury. On 26 June, it was announced that Blake was released by Penrith and had signed a four-and-a-half-year deal with Parramatta.

Blake made his debut for Parramatta against the New Zealand Warriors which ended in a 24–22 victory at the new Western Sydney Stadium.

In Round 22 against the Gold Coast, Blake scored his first and second tries for Parramatta in a 36–12 victory at Cbus Super Stadium.

=== 2020 ===
In round 5 of the 2020 NRL season, Blake scored a try and had one try assist as Parramatta defeated his former club Penrith 16–10. The result saw Parramatta win their first five games of the year, the club's best start to a season since 1986.

Blake played a total of 22 games for Parramatta in the 2020 NRL season as the club finished third but were eliminated in straight sets from the finals. Blake came under intense criticism in the second half of the season after numerous poor defensive displays.

=== 2021 ===
In round 1 of the 2021 NRL season, Blake was injured in Parramatta's 24–16 victory over Brisbane and ruled out for an indefinite period.

Blake returned to the Parramatta starting side for their round 10 victory over the New Zealand Warriors. The following week, Blake was badly exposed in defence during Parramatta's 28–6 loss against Manly-Warringah. Blake missed six tackles throughout the game, gave away four penalties and was sin binned in the 72nd minute.

Blake made a total of 17 appearances for Parramatta in the 2021 NRL season including the club's two finals matches against Newcastle and Penrith.

=== 2022 ===
In round 4 of the 2022 NRL season, Blake scored two tries for Parramatta in a 48–14 victory over St. George. In round 5 of the 2022 NRL season, Blake was taken from the field during the club's 26–20 victory over the Gold Coast. It was later announced that Blake would be ruled out from playing indefinitely with a knee injury. In round 18, Blake scored two tries for Parramatta in a 28–18 victory over the New Zealand Warriors. In round 23, Blake scored two tries for Parramatta in a 42–6 victory over arch-rivals Canterbury. Blake played a total of 22 games for Parramatta throughout the year, including all three of the club's finals matches and the 2022 NRL Grand Final loss to Penrith.

=== 2023 ===
After a number of indifferent performances to start the year, Blake was demoted to the NSW Cup for the club's round 6 match against the Wests Tigers. Blake was replaced in the centre position by Sean Russell. Blake spent the next three months in reserve grade before being recalled to the first grade team due to the suspension of Maika Sivo. Blake made his long-awaited return in the club's 24–16 loss against North Queensland. Following a few indifferent performances, Blake was left out of the Parramatta side for their round 23 match against St. George Illawarra as he was replaced by Isaac Lumelume.

On 31 October, Blake was released by Parramatta after not being offered a new contract.

=== 2024 ===
On 11 January 2024, it was reported that Blake had signed for St Helens R.F.C. in the Super League on a one-year deal. In round 1 of the 2024 Super League season, Blake made his club debut for St Helens in their 40–4 victory over the London Broncos. Following an indifferent start to his time at St Helens, Blake was demoted to the clubs reserves team ahead of their Good Friday match against Wigan. In round 11, Blake scored a hat-trick in St Helens 60–6 victory over Castleford. In round 14, Blake scored two tries for St Helens in their 52–6 victory over London at the Twickenham Stoop. On 2 October, Blake was released by St Helens after not being offered a new contract. On 15 November 2024, it was reported that he had signed for Bradford in the RFL Championship on a two-year deal.

=== 2025 ===
Blake was part of Bradford's promotion & return to the English Super League for the first time in ten years to start in 2026.

== Statistics ==
Year	Team	Games	Tries	Goals	Pts
2015	Penrith Panthers	18	5		20
2016	Penrith Panthers	21	8		32
2017	Penrith Panthers	23	7		28
2018	Penrith Panthers	16	13		52
2019	Penrith Panthers	10	1		4
2019	Parramatta Eels	9	3		12
2020	Parramatta Eels	22	6		24
2021	Parramatta Eels	17	7		28
2022	Parramatta Eels	22	12		48
2023	Parramatta Eels	7			
2024	St. Helens	24	11		44
2025	Bradford Bulls	18	8	1	34
2026	Bradford Bulls	21	11		44
2027	Bradford Bulls				
	Totals	207	81	1	326

== International ==
In October 2023, Blake was selected by Fiji for the 2023 Pacific Rugby League Championships.

In October 2026 he was selected to play for Fiji in the 2026 Rugby League World Cup.
