= James Fisher-Harris =

New Zealand and Māori international rugby league footballer

James Fisher Harris
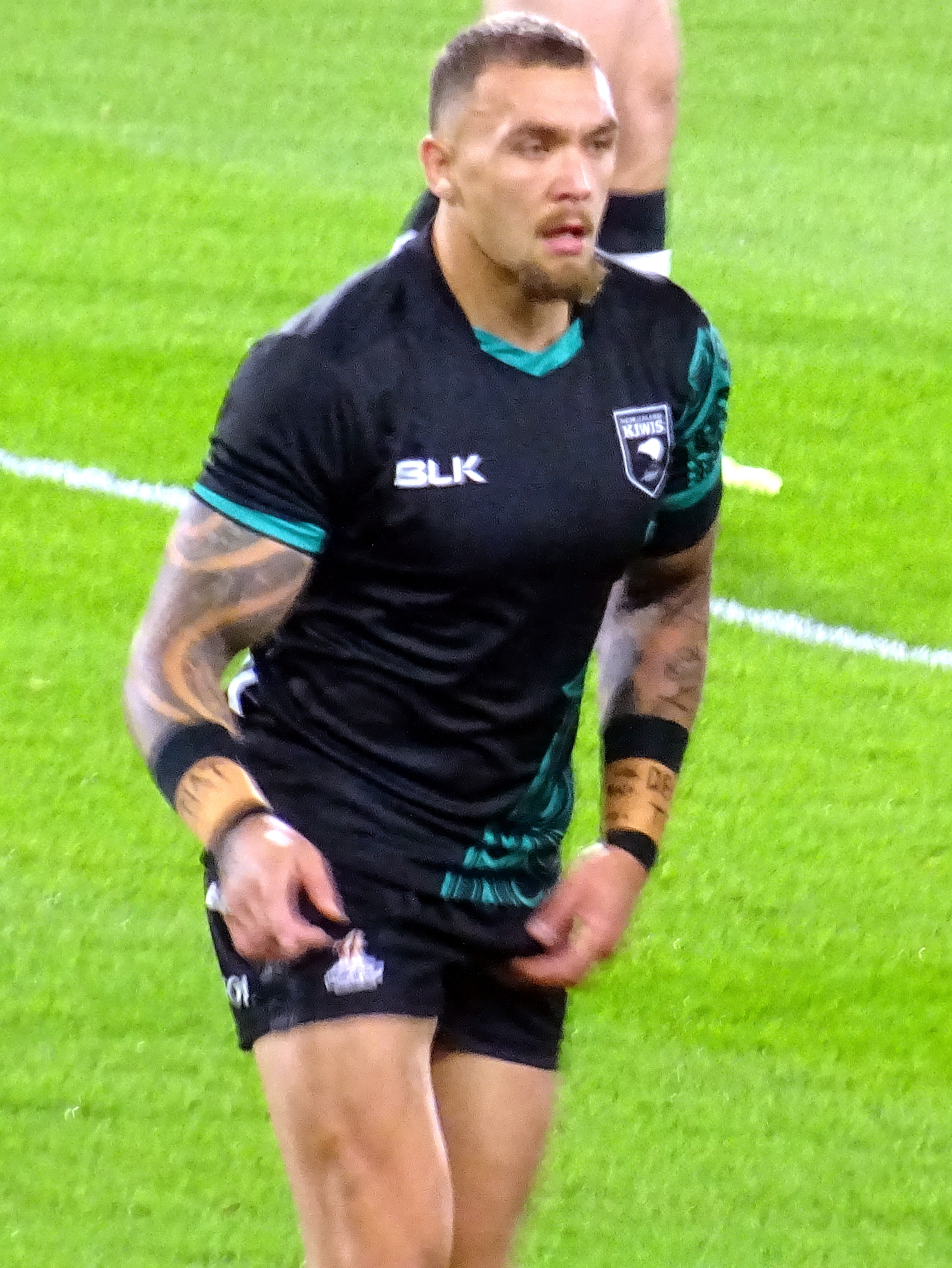

Personal information
- Full name: James Fisher-Harris
- Born: 5 January 1996 (age 30) Kohukohu, New Zealand
- Height: 187 cm (6 ft 2 in)
- Weight: 104 kg (16 st 5 lb)

Playing information
- Position: Prop, Lock, Second-row
Club
Years	Team	Pld	T	G	FG	P
2016–24	Penrith Panthers	203	16	0	0	64
2025–	New Zealand Warriors	42	5	0	0	20
	Total	245	21	0	0	84
Representative
Years	Team	Pld	T	G	FG	P
2016–	New Zealand	26	3	0	0	12
2019–25	Māori All Stars	5	0	0	0	0
- Source: As of 22 November 2026

James Fisher-Harris (born 5 January 1996) is a New Zealand professional rugby league footballer who plays as a prop forward for the New Zealand Warriors in the National Rugby League (NRL), and New Zealand and the New Zealand Māori at international level. He co-captains the Warriors and the Māori, and is the sole captain of the New Zealand national team. He previously played for the Penrith Panthers, with whom he won four straight NRL premierships from 2021 to 2024.

== Background ==
Fisher-Harris was born in Kohukohu, New Zealand. He is of Māori descent.

Fisher-Harris played his junior rugby league for the Whangarei Marist Brothers, before being signed by the Penrith Panthers.

== Playing career ==
=== Early career ===
Fisher-Harris joined Penrith in 2013 as a member of their S. G. Ball Cup team. In 2014 and 2015, Fisher-Harris played for the Penrith Panthers' NYC team.

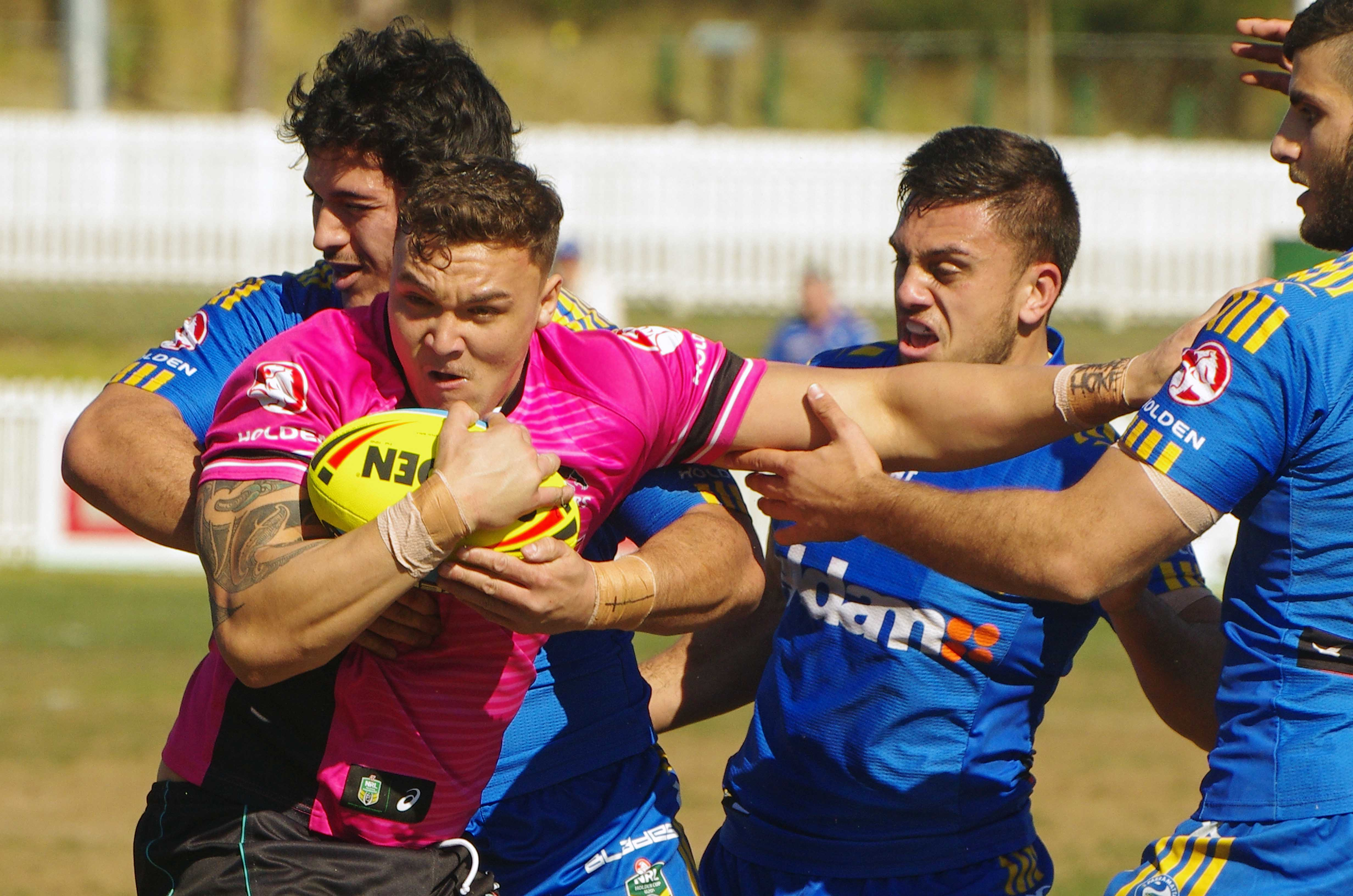
Fisher-Harris (front-left) playing for the Panthers in 2015

On 2 May 2015, he played for the Junior Kiwis, against the Junior Kangaroos, starting at prop in the 22–20 loss at Robina Stadium. On 15 May 2015, Fisher-Harris re-signed with the Penrith club on a three-year contract. On 4 October 2015, Fisher-Harris played in the 2015 Holden Cup Grand final against the Manly-Warringah Sea Eagles, starting at second-row in the 34–18 victory.

=== 2016 ===
In Round 1 of the 2016 NRL season, Fisher-Harris made his NRL debut for the Penrith club against the Canberra Raiders, playing off the interchange bench in Penrith's 30–22 loss at Canberra Stadium. In Round 8 against the Cronulla-Sutherland Sharks, Fisher-Harris scored his first and second NRL career tries in the 20–18 loss at Shark Park. On 2 June 2016, Fisher-Harris extended his contract with the Penrith club from the end of 2018 to the end of 2019. Fisher-Harris finished his debut year in the NRL with him playing in 23 matches and scoring 5 tries for the Penrith club in the 2016 NRL season.

On 22 September 2016, Fisher-Harris was rewarded for his impressive debut season with selection in the New Zealand national rugby league team 24-man squad for the 2016 Four Nations.

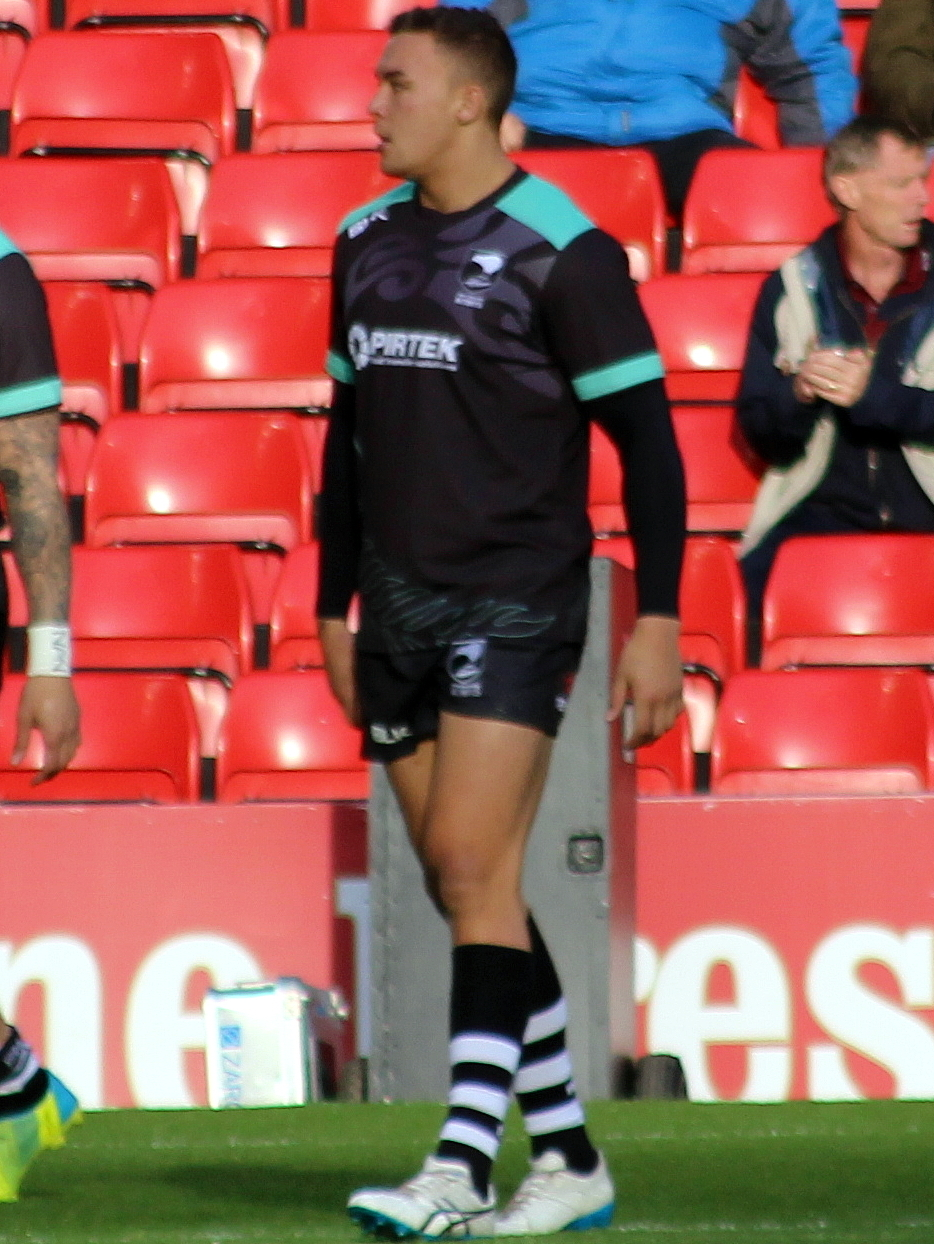
Fisher-Harris warming up for the Kiwis in 2016

On 11 November 2016, Fisher-Harris made his international debut for New Zealand against Scotland, playing off the interchange bench in the shock 18-18 all draw at Derwent Park in Workington, England. This was the only match that Fisher-Harris played in the tournament.

=== 2017 ===
On 21 January 2017, Fisher-Harris was named the junior player of the year by the New Zealand Rugby League.

Fisher-Harris finished the 2017 NRL season with him playing in 15 matches, missing a chunk of matches due to eye, shoulder and hamstring injuries.

=== 2018 ===
Fisher-Harris made 25 appearances for Penrith in 2018 as the club finished 5th on the table and qualified for the finals. Fisher-Harris played in both finals matches as Penrith were eliminated in week two by Cronulla-Sutherland 21–20.

=== 2019 ===
Fisher-Harris made a total of 24 appearances for Penrith in the 2019 NRL season and scored two tries as the club finished 10th on the table and missed out on the finals for the first time since 2015.

=== 2020 ===
Fisher-Harris played 22 games for Penrith as the club won the Minor Premiership. Fisher-Harris played in the 2020 NRL Grand Final which Penrith lost 26–20 against Melbourne.

=== 2021 ===
On 27 September, Fisher-Harris was named Dally M Prop of the year alongside Brisbane's Payne Haas. Fisher-Harris played a total of 24 games for Penrith in the 2021 NRL season including the club's 2021 NRL Grand Final victory over South Sydney.

=== 2022 ===
In round 21 of the 2022 NRL season, Fisher-Harris was sent to the sin bin for a dangerous high tackle in Penrith's victory over Canberra.

Fisher-Harris played 23 games for Penrith throughout the year including the 2022 NRL Grand Final victory over Parramatta. The following day at the post grand final celebrations, Fisher-Harris said “I just want to say Parra are our sons, Right here right now that's just a fact". Fisher-Harris said this in relation to teammate Jarome Luai declaring before and after the grand final that Penrith were Parramatta's "Daddy".

In October he was named in the New Zealand squad for the 2021 Rugby League World Cup.

In November he was named in the 2021 RLWC Team of the Tournament.

=== 2023 ===
On 18 February, Fisher-Harris played in Penrith's 13–12 upset loss to St Helens RFC in the 2023 World Club Challenge. Fisher-Harris played 23 matches for Penrith in the 2023 NRL season including the clubs 26–24 victory over Brisbane in the 2023 NRL Grand Final as Penrith won their third straight premiership.

On 6 December, Fisher-Harris was presented with the Golden Boot award, recognised as the best international player for the year after captaining New Zealand to winning the inaugural Pacific Championships, including a record 30–0 victory over Australia in the final. He became the first prop to receive the award.

=== 2024 ===
On 24 February, Fisher-Harris played in Penrith's 2024 World Club Challenge final loss against Wigan. On 17 April, Fisher-Harris was granted a release from his Penrith contract on compassionate grounds and signed a four-year deal with the New Zealand Warriors, starting in 2025. Fisher-Harris played 23 matches for Penrith in the 2024 NRL season. On 6 October, he won the 2024 NRL Grand Final with the Penrith club, the fourth consecutive premiership victory for the side.

=== 2025 ===
In round 1 of the 2025 NRL season, Fisher-Harris made his club debut for New Zealand in their 30–8 loss against Canberra. In round 27, Fisher-Harris scored the fastest try in NRL history, scoring nine seconds into the game during New Zealand's match against Manly. Fisher-Harris played 19 matches with New Zealand in the 2025 NRL season as the club finished 6th on the table and qualified for the finals. They were eliminated by Penrith in the first week of the finals.

=== 2026 ===
Fisher-Harris played 23 games for the New Zealand Warriors in the 2026 NRL season as the club finished second on the table but were eliminated from the finals in straight sets.

== Honours ==
Individual

- Dally M Prop of the Year: 2020, 2021, 2026
- IRL Golden Boot: 2023
- RLWC Team of the Tournament: 2021

Penrith Panthers

- NRL Premiership: 2021, 2022, 2023, 2024
- NRL Premiership Runners-Up: 2020
- NRL Minor Premiership: 2020, 2022, 2023

New Zealand

- Pacific Championship: 2023, 2025

== Statistics ==
Year	Team	Games	Tries	Pts
2016	Penrith	23	5	20
2017	Penrith	15	0	0
2018	Penrith	25	0	0
2019	Penrith	24	2	8
2020	Penrith	23	0	0
2021	Penrith	24	2	8
2022	Penrith	23	3	12
2023	Penrith	23	0	0
2024	Penrith	23	4	16
2025	New Zealand Warriors	19	2	8
2026	New Zealand Warriors	17	2	8
2027	New Zealand Warriors			
	Totals	239	20	80
