= 2016 Gold Coast Titans season =

- Play-off result: Lost Elimination Final (Brisbane Broncos, 28-44)
- 2016 record: Wins: 11; draws: 1; losses: 12
- Points scored: For: 508; against: 497

Team information
- CEO: Graham Annesley
- Coach: Neil Henry
- Captain: Nathan Friend William Zillman Ryan James
- Stadium: Cbus Super Stadium - 27,400
- Avg. attendance: 13,806
- High attendance: 25,109 (vs. New Zealand Warriors, Rd 22)

Top scorers
- Tries: Ryan James, Anthony Don (12)
- Goals: Tyrone Roberts (54)
- Points: Tyrone Roberts (116)
← 2015	List of seasons	2017 →

The 2016 Gold Coast Titans season was the 10th in the club's history. Coached by Neil Henry and co-captained by Nathan Friend and William Zillman, the Titans are currently competing in the NRL's 2016 Telstra Premiership. They also competed in the 2016 NRL Auckland Nines tournament.

== Season summary ==
=== Milestones ===
- Round 1: Chris McQueen, John Olive, Tyrone Roberts, David Shillington and Ashley Taylor made their debuts for the club.
- Round 1: Nathan Davis and Leivaha Pulu made their first grade debuts.
- Round 1: John Olive scored his first career try.
- Round 2: Nathan Davis scored his first career try.
- Round 3: Tyrone Roberts played his 100th career game.
- Round 3: Ashley Taylor scored his first career try.
- Round 6: Cameron Cullen made his first grade debut and scored his first career try.
- Round 6: Anthony Don played his 50th career game.
- Round 8: Luke Douglas played his 100th game for the club.
- Round 11: Nathan Peats made his debut for the club.
- Round 12: Luke Douglas played his 250th career game.

== Squad list ==
Gold Coast Titans
First team squad			Coaching staff
Greg Bird – LK, SR, FE; Lachlan Burr – SR, LK; Cameron Cullen – FE, HB; Nathan Davis – CE, WG, FB; Anthony Don – WG, FB; Luke Douglas – PR; Kane Elgey – HB, FE; Nathan Friend (c) – HK; Jarryd Hayne – FB, FE; Josh Hoffman – CE, FB, FE; Konrad Hurrell – CE; Ryan James – PR, SR	Karl Lawton – HB, FE, HK; Leva Li – CE, WG; Jeff Lynch – PR, SR; Nene Macdonald – CE, WG; Chris McQueen – SR; David Mead – WG, FB, CE; Daniel Mortimer – HK, HB, FE; Kierran Moseley – HK; John Olive – WG, CE; Agnatius Paasi – PR; Nathan Peats – HK; Nathaniel Peteru – PR	Eddy Pettybourne – PR, SR; Leivaha Pulu – PR; Tyrone Roberts – FE, HB; Matt Robinson – SR; David Shillington – PR; Ryan Simpkins – LK, SR; Matt Srama – HK; Zeb Taia – SR; Ashley Taylor – HB, FE; Oshae Tuiasau – SR, PR; William Zillman (c) – FB	Head coach: Neil Henry; Assistant coach: Terry Matterson; Legend: (c) Captain(s); (vc) Vice-captain(s); Updated: 11 June 2016; Source(s): Titans Squad

== Squad movement ==
=== Gains ===
Player	Signed From	Until End of	Notes
Cameron Cullen	Burleigh Bears (QLD Cup)	2016	
Nathan Davis	Parramatta Eels	?	
Nathan Friend	New Zealand Warriors	2016	
Konrad Hurrell	New Zealand Warriors (Mid Season)	2017	
Jeff Lynch	Canberra Raiders	2016	
Chris McQueen	South Sydney Rabbitohs	2017	
John Olive	South Sydney Rabbitohs	2018	
Nathan Peats	Parramatta Eels (Mid Season)	2017	
Leivaha Pulu	Wyong Roos (NSW Cup)	2016	
Tyrone Roberts	Newcastle Knights	2017	
David Shillington	Canberra Raiders	2017	
Zeb Taia	Catalans Dragons (Super League)	2017	
Ashley Taylor	Brisbane Broncos	2017	

=== Losses ===
Player	Signed To	Until End of	Notes
Caleb Binge	Wynnum Manly Seagulls (QLD Cup)	?	
Jamie Dowling	Burleigh Bears (QLD Cup)	?	
David Crampton	Redcliffe Dolphins (QLD Cup)	?	
Kalifa Faifai Loa	St. George Illawarra Dragons	2017	
Beau Falloon	Leeds Rhinos (Super League)	2016	
Jamal Fogarty	Burleigh Bears (QLD Cup)	?	
Kevin Gordon	Retirement	-	
Christian Hazard	Redcliffe Dolphins (QLD Cup)	?	
Shaun Hudson	North Queensland Cowboys	2017	
Jai Ingram	Released		
Nate Myles	Manly-Warringah Sea Eagles	2018	
Chris Redman	Burleigh Bears (QLD Cup)	?	
Ben Ridge	Retirement	-	
James Roberts	Brisbane Broncos	2017	
Aidan Sezer	Canberra Raiders	2018	
Dave Taylor	Catalans Dragons (Super League)	2017	
Brad Tighe	Retirement	-	
Matt White	Melbourne Storm	2016	

=== Re-signings ===
Player	Club	Until End of	Notes
Anthony Don	Gold Coast Titans	2018	
Kane Elgey	Gold Coast Titans	2018	
Ashley Taylor	Gold Coast Titans	2018	

== Fixtures ==
=== Pre-season ===
Date	Round	Opponent	Venue	Score	Tries	Goals	Attendance
Saturday, 13 February	Trial 1	New Zealand Warriors	Toll Stadium	18 – 40	Anderson, Robinson, Roberts-Davis, Boyle	Fogarty (1)	
Saturday, 13 February	Trial 2	Parramatta Eels	ANZAC Oval	20 – 20 (subscription required)	Friend, Davis, Pulu, Pettybourne	Taylor (1), Davis (1)	2,405
Saturday, 20 February	Trial 3	South Sydney Rabbitohs	Pizzey Park	20 – 22	Kelly, Don, Taia, Cullen	Roberts (1), Davis (1)	5,000
Legend: Win Loss Draw

==== NRL Auckland Nines ====
The NRL Auckland Nines is a pre-season rugby league nines competition featuring all 16 NRL clubs. The 2016 competition was played over two days on the 6 & 7 February at Eden Park. The Titans featured in the Piha pool and played the Raiders, Sharks and Dragons. The club finished top of their pool and along with the Raiders qualified for the Quarter-Finals. They were eventually eliminated by the New Zealand Warriors (4 – 22) in the Semi-Finals. Agnatius Paasi and Chris McQueen were named in the Team of the Tournament.

The Titans' squad for the tournament was:

- Greg Bird, Lachlan Burr, Nathan Davis, Anthony Don, Brian Kelly, Greg Leleisiuao, Jeff Lynch, Nene Macdonald, Chris McQueen, David Mead, Daniel Mortimer, Agnatius Paasi, Nathaniel Peteru, Tyrone Roberts, Matt Srama, Ashley Taylor, Shannon Walker and Shane Wright.

Piha Pool
Team	Pld	W	D	L	PF	PA	PD	Pts
Gold Coast Titans	3	2	0	1	62	50	+12	4
Canberra Raiders	3	2	0	1	61	52	+9	4
Cronulla Sharks	3	2	0	1	46	38	+8	4
St. George Illawarra Dragons	3	0	0	3	40	69	−29	0

Quarter-Finals
Parramatta Eels	12
Newcastle Knights	8
Melbourne Storm	14
North Queensland Cowboys	6
New Zealand Warriors	16
Canberra Raiders	8
Manly Sea Eagles	4
Gold Coast Titans	24

Semi-Finals
Parramatta Eels	17
Melbourne Storm	8
New Zealand Warriors	22
Gold Coast Titans	4

Final
Parramatta Eels	22
New Zealand Warriors	4

Date	Time (Local)	Round	Opponent	Venue	Score	Tries	Goals
Saturday, 6 February	3:35pm	Round 1	Cronulla-Sutherland Sharks	Eden Park	12 – 23	Mead, Bird	Roberts (2/2)
Saturday, 6 February	6:30pm	Round 2	Canberra Raiders	Eden Park	26 – 15	Paasi (Bonus Zone Try), Bird, Roberts, Wright, Davis (Bonus Zone Try)	Roberts (2/3)
Sunday, 7 February	1:05pm	Round 3	St. George Illawarra Dragons	Eden Park	24 – 12	McQueen (2), Paasi, Lelesiuao, Don	Roberts (1/3), Mortimer (1/2)
Sunday, 7 February	3:30pm	Quarter Final	Manly-Warringah Sea Eagles	Eden Park	24 – 4	Macdonald, Mead (Bonus Zone Try), McQueen (Bonus Zone Try), Don	Roberts (2/3), Paasi (1/1)
Sunday, 7 February	5:05pm	Semi Final	New Zealand Warriors	Eden Park	4 – 22	Paasi	
Legend: Win Loss Draw

=== Regular season ===
Date	Round	Opponent	Venue	Score	Tries	Goals	Attendance
Sunday, 6 March	Round 1	Newcastle Knights	Cbus Super Stadium	30 – 12	Don (2), Olive, Paasi, Taia	Roberts (5/6)	8,313
Sunday, 13 March	Round 2	Melbourne Storm	AAMI Park	16 – 34	Hoffman, Davis, James	Roberts (2/3)	12,637
Saturday, 19 March	Round 3	Wests Tigers	Cbus Super Stadium	30 – 18	Mortimer, Hoffman, James, Taylor, Macdonald	Taylor (5/5)	9,975
Saturday, 26 March	Round 4	Canberra Raiders	GIO Stadium	24 – 20	James, Shillington, Taia, Olive	Roberts (1/1), Taylor (3/3)	11,039
Friday, 1 April	Round 5	Brisbane Broncos	Cbus Super Stadium	16 – 24	Taia (2), Mead	Taylor (2/3)	21,080
Sunday, 10 April	Round 6	Cronulla-Sutherland Sharks	Southern Cross Group Stadium	20 – 25	Macdonald, Cullen, Taylor	Taylor (4/4)	11,753
Saturday, 16 April	Round 7	St. George Illawarra Dragons	Cbus Super Stadium	14 – 19	Paasi, Roberts	Roberts (2/2), Taylor (1/1)	12,215
Saturday, 23 April	Round 8	Canterbury-Bankstown Bulldogs	ANZ Stadium	20 – 21	Taia, Mead, Hoffman	Roberts (4/4)	11,450
Sunday, 1 May	Round 9	Melbourne Storm	Cbus Super Stadium	0 – 38			10,214
Monday, 16 May	Round 10	Sydney Roosters	Cbus Super Stadium	26 – 6	Paasi, Mead, McQueen, Zillman	Roberts (5/5)	9,363
Sunday, 22 May	Round 11	Penrith Panthers	Pepper Stadium	28 – 24	Bird, Paasi, Peats, Taylor, Don	Roberts (2/2), Taylor (2/3)	11,210
	Round 12	Bye					
Sunday, 5 June	Round 13	South Sydney Rabbitohs	nib Stadium	29 – 28	James (2), Taylor, Roberts, Hoffman	Roberts (3/4), Taylor (1/1) & (FG)	13,142
Saturday, 11 June	Round 14	Parramatta Eels	TIO Stadium	12 – 22	Don (2), Paasi		7,722
Monday, 20 June	Round 15	Manly-Warringah Sea Eagles	Cbus Super Stadium	30 – 10	Douglas, Don, Hoffman, James, Macdonald	Roberts (5/6)	8,278
Sunday, 26 June	Round 16	Canberra Raiders	Cbus Super Stadium	22 – 30	Macdonald (2), McQueen, James	Roberts (3/4)	12,645
Saturday, 2 July	Round 17	New Zealand Warriors	Mt Smart Stadium	18 – 27	Hoffman, Macdonald, Cullen	Roberts (3/4)	15,107
	Round 18	Bye					
Friday, 15 July	Round 19	St. George Illawarra Dragons	Jubilee Oval	32 – 12	Macdonald (2), McQueen, Peats, Mead, Don	Roberts (4/5)	8,256
Saturday, 23 July	Round 20	Parramatta Eels	Cbus Super Stadium	34 – 14	McQueen (2), Hurrell, Don, Taylor (5/5)		15,273
Monday, 1 August	Round 21	Cronulla-Sutherland Sharks	Cbus Super Stadium	18 – 18	McQueen, Mead, Don	Roberts (3/3)	14,918
Sunday, 7 August	Round 22	New Zealand Warriors	Cbus Super Stadium	14 – 24	James, Hurrell, Don	Taylor (1/3)	25,109
Saturday, 13 August	Round 23	Wests Tigers	Campbelltown Stadium	19 – 18	Don (2), Hoffman, Macdonald	Taylor (1/2), Hayne (FG)	16,783
Saturday, 20 August	Round 24	Newcastle Knights	Hunter Stadium	26 – 6	James (2), McQueen, Douglas	Roberts (5/5)	10,960
Saturday, 27 August	Round 25	Penrith Panthers	Cbus Super Stadium	14 – 15	Pulu, Bird	Roberts (3/3)	18,288
Saturday, 3 September	Round 26	North Queensland Cowboys	1300SMILES Stadium	16 – 32	Mead, James, Hurrell	Roberts (2/3)	21,495
Legend: Win Loss Draw Bye

=== Finals ===
Qualifying and elimination finals
10 Sept, Melbourne Rectangular Stadium
1	Melbourne	16
4	North Queensland	10
9 Sept, Lang Park
5	Brisbane	44
8	Gold Coast	28
11 Sept, Sydney Football Stadium
6	Penrith	28
7	Canterbury	12
10 Sept, Canberra Stadium
2	Canberra	14
3	Cronulla	16

Semi-finals
16 Sept, Willows Sports Complex
North Queensland	26
Brisbane	20
17 Sept, Canberra Stadium
Canberra	22
Penrith	12

Preliminary finals
24 Sept, Melbourne Rectangular Stadium
Melbourne	14
Canberra	12
23 Sept, Sydney Football Stadium
Cronulla	32
North Queensland	20

Grand final
2 Oct, Stadium Australia
Melbourne	12
Cronulla	14

Date	Round	Opponent	Venue	Score	Tries	Goals	Attendance
Friday, 9 September	Elimination Final	Brisbane Broncos	Suncorp Stadium	44 – 28	McQueen (2), Hoffman, James, Mead	Roberts (4/5)	43,170
Legend: Win Loss Draw

==== Ladder ====
2016 NRL season
Pos	Team	Pld	W	D	L	B	PF	PA	PD	Pts
1	Melbourne Storm	24	19	0	5	2	563	302	+261	42
2	Canberra Raiders	24	17	1	6	2	688	456	+232	39
3	Cronulla-Sutherland Sharks (P)	24	17	1	6	2	580	404	+176	39
4	North Queensland Cowboys	24	15	0	9	2	584	355	+229	34
5	Brisbane Broncos	24	15	0	9	2	554	434	+120	34
6	Penrith Panthers	24	14	0	10	2	563	463	+100	32
7	Canterbury-Bankstown Bulldogs	24	14	0	10	2	506	448	+58	32
8	Gold Coast Titans	24	11	1	12	2	508	497	+11	27
9	Wests Tigers	24	11	0	13	2	499	607	−108	26
10	New Zealand Warriors	24	10	0	14	2	513	601	−88	24
11	St. George Illawarra Dragons	24	10	0	14	2	341	538	−197	24
12	South Sydney Rabbitohs	24	9	0	15	2	473	549	−76	22
13	Manly-Warringah Sea Eagles	24	8	0	16	2	454	563	−109	20
14	Parramatta Eels	24	13	0	11	2	298	324	−26	18^{1}
15	Sydney Roosters	24	6	0	18	2	443	576	−133	16
16	Newcastle Knights	24	1	1	22	2	305	800	−495	7

^{1} Parramatta were deducted 12 competition points and their for/against tally accumulated between rounds 1-9 for gross long-term salary cap breaches.

== Statistics ==
Name	App	T	G	FG	Pts
Greg Bird	12	1	0	0	4
Lachlan Burr	2	0	0	0	0
Cameron Cullen	2	1	0	0	4
Nathan Davis	6	1	0	0	4
Anthony Don	12	5	0	0	20
Luke Douglas	12	0	0	0	0
Nathan Friend	12	0	0	0	0
Josh Hoffman	13	4	0	0	16
Konrad Hurrell	1	0	0	0	0
Ryan James	13	5	0	0	20
Nene Macdonald	11	2	0	0	8
Chris McQueen	13	1	0	0	4
David Mead	10	3	0	0	12
Daniel Mortimer	7	1	0	0	4
Kierran Moseley	4	0	0	0	0
John Olive	4	2	0	0	8
Agnatius Paasi	13	5	0	0	20
Nathan Peats	3	1	0	0	4
Eddy Pettybourne	6	0	0	0	0
Leivaha Pulu	13	0	0	0	0
Tyrone Roberts	11	2	24	0	56
David Shillington	8	1	0	0	4
Zeb Taia	13	5	0	0	20
Ashley Taylor	12	4	18	1	53
William Zillman	8	1	0	0	4
Totals		45	42	1	265

== Representatives ==
The following players have played a representative match in 2016.

	All Stars match	City Vs Country	ANZAC Test	Pacific Test	State Of Origin 1	State Of Origin 2	State of Origin 3	Four Nations
Greg Bird	Indigenous All Stars	-	-	-	New South Wales			
Ryan James	Indigenous All Stars	-	-	-	-			
Nene Macdonald	World All Stars	-	-	Papua New Guinea	-			
David Mead	-	-	-	Papua New Guinea	-			
Tyrone Roberts	Indigenous All Stars	-	-	-	-			
