= 2017 Gold Coast Titans season =

Sports competition

- 2017 record: Wins: 7; draws: 0; losses: 17
- Points scored: For: 448; against: 638

Team information
- CEO: Graham Annesley
- Coach: Neil Henry
- Captain: Ryan James Kevin Proctor Nathan Peats
- Stadium: Cbus Super Stadium - 27,400
- Avg. attendance: 13,690
- High attendance: 21,716 (vs. Brisbane Broncos, Rd 22)

Top scorers
- Tries: Anthony Don (12)
- Goals: Ashley Taylor (40)
- Points: Ashley Taylor (100)
← 2016	List of seasons	2018 →

The 2017 Gold Coast Titans season was the 11th in the club's history. The Titans competed in the National Rugby League's 2017 Telstra Premiership. They also competed in the 2017 NRL Auckland Nines pre-season tournament.

== Season summary ==
=== Milestones ===
- Round 1: Joe Greenwood, Kevin Proctor, Jarrod Wallace and Dan Sarginson made their debut for the club.
- Round 2: Tyronne Roberts-Davis made his first grade debut.
- Round 3: Tyler Cornish and Max King made their first grade debut.
- Round 4: Dale Copley and Daniel Vidot made their debut for the club.
- Round 5: Chris Grevsmuhl made his debut for the club.
- Round 5: The club played their 250th game in the NRL.
- Round 6: Morgan Boyle made his first grade debut. Paterika Vaivai made his debut for the club.
- Round 15: Phillip Sami made his first grade debut. Pat Politoni made his debut for the club.
- Round 16: Jamal Fogarty made his first grade debut.
- Round 24: Ben Nakubuwai made his first grade debut.
- Round 26: Keegan Hipgrave made his first grade debut.

== Ladder ==
2017 NRL season
Pos	Team	Pld	W	D	L	B	PF	PA	PD	Pts
1	Melbourne Storm (P)	24	20	0	4	2	633	336	+297	44
2	Sydney Roosters	24	17	0	7	2	500	428	+72	38
3	Brisbane Broncos	24	16	0	8	2	597	433	+164	36
4	Parramatta Eels	24	16	0	8	2	496	457	+39	36
5	Cronulla-Sutherland Sharks	24	15	0	9	2	476	407	+69	34
6	Manly-Warringah Sea Eagles	24	14	0	10	2	552	512	+40	32
7	Penrith Panthers	24	13	0	11	2	504	459	+45	30
8	North Queensland Cowboys	24	13	0	11	2	467	443	+24	30
9	St. George Illawarra Dragons	24	12	0	12	2	533	450	+83	28
10	Canberra Raiders	24	11	0	13	2	558	497	+61	26
11	Canterbury-Bankstown Bulldogs	24	10	0	14	2	360	455	−95	24
12	South Sydney Rabbitohs	24	9	0	15	2	464	564	−100	22
13	New Zealand Warriors	24	7	0	17	2	444	575	−131	18
14	Wests Tigers	24	7	0	17	2	413	571	−158	18
15	Gold Coast Titans	24	7	0	17	2	448	638	−190	18
16	Newcastle Knights	24	5	0	19	2	428	648	−220	14

== Fixtures ==
=== NRL Auckland Nines ===
Waiheke Pool
Team	Pld	W	D	L	PF	PA	PD	Pts
Penrith Panthers	3	3	0	0	66	36	+30	6
Gold Coast Titans	3	2	0	1	46	36	+10	4
Cronulla Sharks	3	1	0	2	46	45	+1	2
Canterbury Bankstown Bulldogs	3	0	0	3	32	73	−41	0

==== NRL Auckland Nines Finals ====
Quarter-finals
Penrith Panthers	16
Manly Sea Eagles	12
Parramatta Eels	14
Gold Coast Titans	0
Brisbane Broncos	14
Sydney Roosters	15
North Queensland Cowboys	12
Melbourne Storm	25

Semi-finals
Penrith Panthers	13
Parramatta Eels	0
Sydney Roosters	21
Melbourne Storm	16

Final
Penrith Panthers	8
Sydney Roosters	10

=== Regular season ===
Date	Round	Opponent	Venue	Score	Tries	Goals	Attendance
Sunday, 4 March	Round 1	Sydney Roosters	Cbus Super Stadium	18 – 32	Don, Elgey, Hayne	Taylor (3/3)	13,933
Saturday 11 March	Round 2	Newcastle Knights	McDonald Jones Stadium	26 – 34	Hurrell (2), Greenwood, Lawton, Roberts-Davis	Taylor (3/6)	12,869
Friday 14 March	Round 3	Parramatta Eels	Cbus Super Stadium	26 – 14	Cornish, Elgey, McQueen, Roberts	Taylor (5/5)	11,612
Saturday 25 March	Round 4	North Queensland Cowboys	Cbus Super Stadium	26 – 32	Copley, Roberts, Roberts-Davis, Vidot	Taylor (3/5)	17,674
Sunday 2 April	Round 5	New Zealand Warriors	Mt Smart Stadium	22 – 28	Elgey (2), Copley, Vidot	Taylor (3/4)	10,263
Saturday 8 April	Round 6	Canberra Raiders	Cbus Super Stadium	16 – 42	Don, Lawton, Taylor	Taylor (2/3)	12,390
Friday 14 April	Round 7	Brisbane Broncos	Suncorp Stadium	22 – 24	Don, Elgey, Grevsmuhl, James	Taylor (3/4)	34,592
Saturday 22 April	Round 8	Cronulla-Sutherland Sharks	Southern Cross Group Stadium	16 – 12	Pulu (2), Roberts	Taylor (2/3)	12,397
Saturday 29 April	Round 9	Newcastle Knights	Cbus Super Stadium	38 – 8	Hayne (2), Hurrell (2), Elgey, Greenwood, James	Elgey (3/3), Taylor (2/4)	10,511
Saturday 13 May	Round 10	Melbourne Storm	Suncorp Stadium	38 – 36	Hurrell (2), Don, James, McQueen, Pulu, Roberts	Elgey (5/7), Taylor (0/1)	44,127
Saturday 20 May	Round 11	Manly-Warringah Sea Eagles	Cbus Super Stadium	10 – 30	Don, Taylor	Taylor (1/2)	12,509
	Round 12	Bye					
Saturday 3 June	Round 13	North Queensland Cowboys	1300SMILES Stadium	8 – 20	Taylor	Taylor (2/2)	14,612
Saturday 10 June	Round 14	New Zealand Warriors	Cbus Super Stadium	12 – 34	Copley, Elgey, Hayne	Don (0/1), Taylor (0/2)	14,067
Friday 16 June	Round 15	South Sydney Rabbitohs	ANZ Stadium	20 – 36	Greenwood, Politoni, Proctor	Taylor (4/4)	7,163
Friday 23 June	Round 16	Wests Tigers	Campbelltown Stadium	26 – 14	Hayne (2), Hurrell (2), Zillman	Taylor (3/5)	6,891
Friday 30 June	Round 17	St George Illawarra Dragons	Cbus Super Stadium	20 – 10	Don (3)	Roberts (2/2), Taylor (2/4)	13,140
	Round 18	Bye					
Saturday 15 July	Round 19	Cronulla-Sutherland Sharks	Cbus Super Stadium	30 – 10	Taylor (2), Greenwood, Hurrell, Palitoni, Proctor	Roberts (3/5), Taylor (0/1)	14,333
Saturday 22 July	Round 20	Penrith Panthers	Pepper Stadium	24 – 16	Don, Hayne, Roberts	Roberts (2/3)	11,480
Sunday 30 July	Round 21	Wests Tigers	Cbus Super Stadium	4 – 26	Hayne		11,516
Saturday 5 August	Round 22	Brisbane Broncos	Cbus Super Stadium	0 – 56			21,716
Saturday 12 August	Round 23	St George Illawarra Dragons	UOW Jubilee Oval	16 – 42	Copley, Don, Vaivai	Roberts (2/3)	6,826
Thursday 17 August	Round 24	Parramatta Eels	ANZ Stadium	8 – 30	Nakubuwai, Zillman	Elgey (0/1), Roberts (0/1)	6,826
Saturday 26 August	Round 25	Canterbury Bankstown Bulldogs	Cbus Super Stadium	14 – 26	Don, Roberts, Sami	Roberts (1/3)	10,884
Saturday 2 September	Round 26	Sydney Roosters	Allianz Stadium	16 – 20	Don, Proctor, Pulu	Taylor (2/3)	11,212
Legend: Win Loss Draw Bye
