= List of Gold Coast Titans representatives =

Including players from the Gold Coast Titans that have represented while at the club and the years that they achieved their honours, if known. Representatives from the Burleigh Bears, Ipswich Jets, Tweed Heads Seagulls and Past Gold Coast franchises are included as they are feeder clubs.

== International ==
=== Australia ===
- 531 (Australia) Wally Lewis (1991)
- 570 (Australia) Dale Shearer (1993)
- 706 (Australia) Luke Bailey (2007, 2009)
- 729 (Australia) Scott Prince (2008)
- 754 (Australia) Anthony Laffranchi (2008–09)
- 743 (Australia) Greg Bird (2010, 2012–15)
- 769 (Australia) Nate Myles (2012-15)
- 836 (Australia) Tino Fa'asuamaleaui (2022-23, 2025)

=== Cook Islands ===
- (Cook Islands) Dominique Peyroux (2009)
- (Cook Islands) Brad Takairangi (2013)
- (Cook Islands) Esan Marsters (2022)

=== England ===
- (England) Chris McQueen (2017)
- (England) AJ Brimson (2025)

=== Fiji ===
- (Fiji) Jarryd Hayne (2017)
- (Fiji) Ben Nakubuwai (2017)

=== Ireland ===
- (Republic of Ireland) Jaimin Jolliffe (2022)

=== Italy ===
- (Italy) Mark Minichiello (2013)

=== New Zealand ===
- 593 (New Zealand) Brent Todd (1992–93)
- 719 (New Zealand) Jake Webster (2007)
- 771 (New Zealand) Kevin Proctor (2017-19)
- 805 (New Zealand) Isaac Liu (2022)
- 757 (New Zealand) Kieran Foran (2023, 2025)
- 836 (New Zealand) Keano Kini (2024-25)
- 842 (New Zealand) Erin Clark (2024)

=== Papua New Guinea ===
- (Papua New Guinea) David Mead (2008–16)
- (Papua New Guinea) Trevor Exton (2008)
- (Papua New Guinea) Ryan Tongia (2010)
- (Papua New Guinea) Nene McDonald (2016)
- (Papua New Guinea) Jacob Alick-Wiencke (2022-25)
- (Papua New Guinea) Cooper Bai (2025)

=== Philippines ===
- (Philippines) Matt Srama (2012)
- (Philippines) Kevin Gordon (2012)
- (Philippines) Klese Haas (2019-22)

=== Samoa ===
- (Samoa) Smith Samau (2008)
- (Samoa) Sam Tagataese (2009)
- (Samoa) Keenan Palasia (2024)

=== Scotland ===
- (Scotland) Luke Douglas (2013-16)

=== Tonga ===
- (Tonga) Lelea Paea (2007)
- Esikeli Tonga (2008)
- (Tonga) Konrad Hurrell (2017-18)
- (Tonga) Moeaki Fotuaika (2022)
- (Tonga) David Fifita (2022)

=== United States ===
- (United States) Matthew Petersen (2007)
- (United States) David Myles (2007)
- (United States) Eddy Pettybourne (2017)

=== Wales ===
- (Wales) Kevin Ellis (1996)

== State Of Origin ==
=== Queensland ===
- 42 (Queensland) Bob Lindner (1989)
- 09 (Queensland) Wally Lewis (1991)
- 43 (Queensland) Dale Shearer (1992–93)
- 67 (Queensland) Steve Jackson (1992–93)
- 69 (Queensland) Mike McLean (1992)
- 81 (Queensland) Adrian Vowles (1994)
- 89 (Queensland) Ben Ikin (1995)
- 99 (Queensland) Jamie Goddard (1997–98)
- 143 (Queensland) Scott Prince (2008)
- 151 (Queensland) Ashley Harrison (2008–13)
- 158 (Queensland) Nate Myles (2012-15)
- 169 (Queensland) David Taylor (2014)
- 189 (Queensland) Jarrod Wallace (2017-19)
- 196 (Queensland) Jai Arrow (2018-20)
- 204 (Queensland) AJ Brimson (2020-21, 23)
- 207 (Queensland) Phillip Sami (2020)
- 213 (Queensland) Moeaki Fotuaika (2020-21, 23-25)
- 200 (Queensland) David Fifita (2021, 23)
- 209 (Queensland) Tino Fa'asuamaleaui (2021-23, 25)
- 233 (Queensland) Beau Fermor (2025)
- 237 (Queensland) Jojo Fifita (2026)

=== New South Wales ===
- 171 (New South Wales) Luke Bailey (2007, 2009)
- 212 (New South Wales) Anthony Laffranchi (2008–09)
- 206 (New South Wales) Greg Bird (2010-14, 16)
- 200 (New South Wales) Jarryd Hayne (2017)
- 266 (New South Wales) Nathan Peats (2017)

== All Stars Game ==
=== Indigenous All Stars ===
- Scott Prince (2010-12)
- Greg Bird (2010-13, 2016)
- Preston Campbell (2010)
- Ryan James (2011, 2013, 2015–17)
- Jamal Idris (2012)
- Aiden Sezer (2013)
- Brad Tighe (2015)
- Josh Hoffman (2015)
- Kierran Moseley (2015)
- Tyrone Roberts (2016-20)
- Ashley Taylor (2017)
- Nathan Peats (2017-20)
- Leilani Latu (2019)
- Tyrone Peachey (2019-20)
- Jamal Fogarty (2021)
- David Fifita (2021-22)
- Corey Thompson (2021)
- Brian Kelly (2021, 2023)
- Will Smith (2022)
- Alofiana Khan-Pereira (2024)

=== NRL All Stars ===
- (Australia) Luke Bailey (2010, 2012)
- (Australia) Ashley Harrison (2011, 2013)
- (Australia) David Taylor (2015)
- (Papua New Guinea) Nene MacDonald (2016)
- (England) Chris McQueen (2017)

=== Māori All Stars ===
- (Māori people) Kevin Proctor (2019-20, 2022)
- (Māori people) Patrick Herbert (2021-22)
- (Māori people) Erin Clark (2022)
- (Māori people) Esan Marsters (2022)
- (Māori people) Jojo Fifita (2024)

== City Vs Country Origin ==
=== NSW Country ===
- (New South Wales) Anthony Laffranchi (2007–08, 2010)
- (New South Wales) Preston Campbell (2007)
- (New South Wales) Greg Bird (2010, 2012)
- (New South Wales) Luke Douglas (2012)
- (New South Wales) Ryan James (2013, 2015)
- (New South Wales) Kevin Gordon (2014)
- (New South Wales) David Mead (2014-15)
- (New South Wales) Anthony Don (2017)

=== NSW City ===
- (New South Wales) Mark Minichiello (2007–12)
- (New South Wales) Brett Delaney (2008)
- (New South Wales) Beau Falloon (2014)
- (New South Wales) James Roberts (2015)

== Other honours ==
=== Prime Minister's XIII ===
- (Australia) Scott Prince (2007–08, 2012)
- (Australia) Brett Delaney (2008)
- (Australia) Greg Bird (2011, 2013–14)
- (Australia) Aidan Sezer (2013)
- (Australia) Ryan James (2013, 2016)
- (Australia) Kevin Gordon (2013)
- (Australia) Kane Elgey (2015)
- (Australia) Daniel Mortimer (2015)
- (Australia) Jai Arrow (2019)
- (Australia) Jojo Fifita (2022)
- (Australia) Tino Fa'asuamaleaui (2022-23)
- (Australia) Beau Fermor (2022)
- (Australia) Alofiana Khan-Pereira (2023)

=== Indigenous Dreamtime Team ===
- Preston Campbell (2008)
- Ian Lacey (2008)

=== New Zealand Māori ===
- (Māori people) Jordan Rapana (2008)

== Representative Captains ==
=== Test Captains ===
United States

- (United States) Matthew Petersen (2008)

=== All Stars Game ===
Indigenous All Stars

- Preston Campbell (2010)

=== Other honours ===
Indigenous Dreamtime Team

- Preston Campbell (2008)

Prime Minister's XIII

- (Australia) Greg Bird (2014)

== Representative Coaching Staff ==
=== International ===
Australia

- (Australia) John Cartwright (Assistant Coach - 2007–08)

=== State Of Origin ===
Queensland

- (Queensland) Billy Johnstone (Trainer - 2007–08)

=== City Vs Country Origin ===
NSW City

- (New South Wales) John Cartwright (Coach - 2009–10)
