= 2017 Canberra Raiders season =

- NRL Rank: 10th
- 2017 record: Wins: 11; draws: 0; losses: 13
- Points scored: For: 558; against: 497

Team information
- CEO: Don Furner Jr.
- Coach: Ricky Stuart (4th season)
- Captain: Jarrod Croker (3rd season)
- Stadium: GIO Stadium - 25,011
- Avg. attendance: 14,101
- Agg. attendance: 169,217
- High attendance: 17,653 (Round 5 vs Parramatta Eels)
- Low attendance: 10,226 (Round 17 vs North Queensland Cowboys)

Top scorers
- Tries: Jordan Rapana (21)
- Goals: Jarrod Croker (77)
- Points: Jarrod Croker (190)
Home colours	Away colours
← 2016	List of seasons	2018 →

The 2017 Canberra Raiders season was the 36th in the club's history. Coached by Ricky Stuart and captained by Jarrod Croker, the Raiders competed in the NRL's 2017 Telstra Premiership. They also competed in the 2017 NRL Auckland Nines pre-season tournament.

== Squad ==
Canberra Raiders
NRL Squad 2017			Coaching staff
Eddie Aiono – WG; Blake Austin – FE; Kurt Baptiste – HK; Luke Bateman – LK; Shannon Boyd – PR; Erin Clark – HK, FE, HB; Nick Cotric – FB, CE, WG; Jarrod Croker (c) – CE; Lachlan Croker – FE, HB; Bill Cullen – SR, PR	Masivesi Dakuwaqa – CE, LK, SR, WG; Josh Hodgson (vc) – HK; Royce Hunt – PR, SR, LK; Liam Knight – LK, PR, SR; Joseph Leilua – CE; Jeff Lima – PR; Dunamis Lui – PR; Makahesi Makatoa – SR, LK, PR; Brent Naden – CE; Kato Ottio – WG, CE; Michael Oldfield – WG, CE	Josh Papalii – SR; Junior Paulo – PR; Clay Priest – LK, PR; Jordan Rapana – WG; Aidan Sezer – HB; Iosia Soliola – SR; Scott Sorensen – SR; Joseph Tapine – SR, PR, LK; David Taylor – SR, CE, PR; Elliott Whitehead – SR; Jack Wighton – FB	Head coach: Ricky Stuart; Assistant coaches: Dean Pay; Mick Crawley; Legend: (c) Captain(s); (vc) Vice-captain(s); Updated: 12 September 2017; Source(s): Raiders 2017 Squad

=== Player transfers ===
==== Gains ====
Player	Signed from	Until End Of
Dunamis Lui	St George Illawarra Dragons	2018
Makahesi Makatoa	Canterbury-Bankstown Bulldogs	2017
Junior Paulo	Parramatta Eels (Mid Season)	2018
Scott Sorensen	Mount Pritchard Mounties	2017
David Taylor	Catalans Dragons	2017
Jordan Turner	St. Helens	2018

==== Loses ====
Player	Signed To	Until End Of
Mitchell Barnett	Newcastle Knights (Mid Season)	2017
Shaun Fensom	North Queensland Cowboys	2018
Jarrad Kennedy	Manly Warringah Sea Eagles	2017
Brenko Lee	Canterbury-Bankstown Bulldogs	2018
Edrick Lee	Cronulla-Sutherland Sharks	2018
Lachlan Lewis	Canterbury-Bankstown Bulldogs (Mid Season)	2018
Frank-Paul Nu'uausala	Wigan Warriors (Mid Season)	2019
Tevita Pangai	Brisbane Broncos (Mid Season)	2018
Paul Vaughan	St George Illawarra Dragons	2019
Sisa Waqa	FC Grenoble (Rugby Union) (Mid Season)	
Sam Williams	Wakefield Trinity	2017
Zac Woolford	Canterbury-Bankstown Bulldogs	2018

== Fixtures ==
=== Auckland Nines ===
Saturday, 4 February
1:05PM

Canberra Raiders	15 – 12	South Sydney Rabbitohs

Eden Park, Auckland

Saturday, 4 February
4:35PM

North Queensland Cowboys	35 – 6	Canberra Raiders

Eden Park, Auckland

Sunday, 5 February
11:30AM

Sydney Roosters	21 – 0	Canberra Raiders

Eden Park, Auckland

=== Trials ===
Saturday, 18 February
6:00PM

Canberra Raiders	0 – 44	Newcastle Knights

Seiffert Oval, Queanbeyan

=== NRL ===
==== Round 1 ====
Saturday, 4 March
7:00PM

North Queensland Cowboys	20 – 16	Canberra Raiders
Tries: Lachlan Coote (29') 1 Coen Hess (66') 1 Javid Bowen (70') 1 Gavin Cooper (84') 1 Goals: Johnathan Thurston 2/3 (30', 67')	1st: 6 – 6; 2nd: 10 – 10; GP: 4 – 0	Tries: 2 (58', 77') Joseph Leilua; 1 (12') Zac Santo; Goals: 2/3 Aidan Sezer (13', 78')

1300SMILES Stadium, Townsville
Attendance: 17,548
Referee: Ben Cummins, Chris Sutton
Player of the Match: Jason Taumalolo

==== Round 2 ====
Saturday, 11 March
7:30PM

Canberra Raiders	16 – 42	Cronulla-Sutherland Sharks
Tries: Jack Wighton (15', 78') 2 Jordan Rapana (36') 1 Goals: Aidan Sezer 2/3 (37', 79')	1st: 10 – 10; 2nd: 6 – 32	Tries: 3 (32', 53', 57') Wade Graham; 1 (24') Ricky Leutele; 1 (47') Jayden Brailey; 1 (70') Matt Prior; 1 (73') Paul Gallen; Goals: 5/7 James Maloney (25', 48', 58', 71', 75')

GIO Stadium, Canberra
Attendance: 15,807
Referee: Ashley Klein, Chris James
Player of the Match: Wade Graham

==== Round 3 ====
Sunday, 19 March
4:00PM

Canberra Raiders	46 – 6	Wests Tigers
Tries: Jordan Rapana (20', 79') 2 Josh Papalii (35') 1 Blake Austin (38') 1 Nick Cotric (47') 1 Jack Wighton (58') 1 Jarrod Croker (62') 1 Elliott Whitehead (66') 1 Goals: Jarrod Croker 7/8 (22', 37', 39', 49', 59', 67', 80')	1st: 18 – 6; 2nd: 28 – 0	Tries: 1 (12') David Nofoaluma; Goals: 1/1 Mitchell Moses (13')

GIO Stadium, Canberra
Attendance: 14,628
Referee: Matt Cecchin, Alan Shortall
Player of the Match: Jordan Rapana

==== Round 4 ====
Friday, 24 March
7:05PM

Brisbane Broncos	13 – 12	Canberra Raiders
Tries: Andrew McCullough (44') 1 Darius Boyd (51') 1 Goals: Jordan Kahu 2/3 (5' pen, 45'); Field Goals: Jordan Kahu (74') 1	1st: 2 – 2; 2nd: 11 – 10	Tries: 1 (64') Jordan Rapana; 1 (72') Blake Austin; Goals: 2/3 Jarrod Croker (37' pen, 73')

Suncorp Stadium, Brisbane
Attendance: 29,370
Referee: Ashley Klein, Adam Gee
Player of the Match: Andrew McCullough

==== Round 5 ====
Saturday, 1 April
5:30PM

Canberra Raiders	30 – 18	Parramatta Eels
Tries: Iosia Soliola (6') 1 Blake Austin (28') 1 Joseph Leilua (30') 1 Jarrod Croker (35') 1 Nick Cotric (69') 1 Goals: Jarrod Croker 5/6 (8', 29', 37', 70', 76' pen)	1st: 22 – 6; 2nd: 8 – 12	Tries: 1 (24') Bevan French; 1 (47') Michael Jennings; 1 (52') Kaysa Pritchard; Goals: 3/3 Clint Gutherson (25', 48', 53')

GIO Stadium, Canberra
Attendance: 17,653
Referee: Gerard Sutton, Alan Shortall
Player of the Match: Iosia Soliola

==== Round 6 ====
Saturday, 8 April
5:30PM

Gold Coast Titans	16 – 42	Canberra Raiders
Tries: Anthony Don (19') 1 Karl Lawton (34') 1 Ashley Taylor (41') 1 Goals: Ashley Taylor 2/3 (35', 43')	1st: 10 – 26; 2nd: 6 – 16	Tries: 3 (7', 12', 25') Jordan Rapana; 1 (28') Jack Wighton; 1 (31') Joseph Leilua; 1 (49') Elliott Whitehead; 1 (59') Josh Papalii; 1 (69') Nick Cotric; Goals: 5/6 Aidan Sezer (26', 30', 32', 60', 70'); 0/2 Jarrod Croker

Cbus Super Stadium, Gold Coast
Attendance: 12,390
Referee: Ashley Klein, Chris Butler
Player of the Match: Jordan Rapana

==== Round 7 ====
Saturday, 15 April
5:30PM

Canberra Raiders	20 – 8	New Zealand Warriors
Tries: Joseph Leilua (20', 59') 2 Josh Hodgson (66') 1 Goals: Jarrod Croker 4/5 (21', 52' pen, 68', 75' pen)	1st: 6 – 8; 2nd: 14 – 0	Tries: 1 (6') Ryan Hoffman; Goals: 2/2 Shaun Johnson (7', 24' pen)

GIO Stadium, Canberra
Attendance: 13,996
Referee: Adam Gee, Gavin Reynolds
Player of the Match: Josh Hodgson

==== Round 8 ====
Friday, 21 April
6:00PM

Canberra Raiders	18 – 20	Manly Warringah Sea Eagles
Tries: Jarrod Croker (27') 1 Josh Papalii (46') 1 Jordan Rapana (73') 1 Goals: Jarrod Croker 3/4 (28', 48', 65' pen)	1st: 12 – 2; 2nd: 6 – 16; GP: 0 – 2	Tries: 1 (54') Jake Trbojevic; 1 (57') Dylan Walker; 1 (76') Tom Trbojevic; Goals: 4/6 Dylan Walker (6' pen, 55', 59', 85' pen)

GIO Stadium, Canberra
Attendance: 15,976
Referee: Grant Atkins, Chris Sutton
Player of the Match: Josh Papalii

==== Round 9 ====
Saturday, 29 April
5:30PM

Canterbury-Bankstown Bulldogs	16 – 10	Canberra Raiders
Tries: Adam Elliott (5', 58') 2 Josh Morris (45') 1 Goals: Kerrod Holland 2/3 (47', 59')	1st: 4 – 10; 2nd: 12 – 0	Tries: 1 (16') Jarrod Croker; 1 (32') Josh Hodgson; Goals: 0/1 Aidan Sezer; 1/1 Jarrod Croker (33')

ANZ Stadium, Sydney
Attendance: 13,390
Referee: Henry Perenara, Chris James
Player of the Match: Will Hopoate

==== Round 10 ====
Sunday, 14 May
2:00PM

Newcastle Knights	34 – 20	Canberra Raiders
Tries: Sione Mata'utia (16', 60') 2 Nathan Ross (5') 1 Joe Wardle (56') 1 Peter Mata'utia (66') 1 Brock Lamb (78') 1 Goals: Brock Lamb 5/7 (17', 57', 61', 68', 80')	1st: 10 – 8; 2nd: 24 – 12	Tries: 2 (9', 75') Nick Cotric; 1 (44') Elliott Whitehead; Goals: 3/3 Jarrod Croker (10', 13' pen, 45'); 1/1 Aidan Sezer (75')

McDonald Jones Stadium, Newcastle
Attendance: 10,997
Referee: Gavin Badger, Peter Gough
Player of the Match: Sione Mata'utia

==== Round 11 ====
Saturday, 20 May
7:30PM

Parramatta Eels	16 – 22	Canberra Raiders
Tries: Manu Ma'u (34') 1 Michael Jennings (39') 1 Siosaia Vave (48') 1 Goals: Clint Gutherson 2/3 (40', 49')	1st: 10 – 10; 2nd: 6 – 12	Tries: 1 (4') Nick Cotric; 1 (20') Joey Leilua; 1 (56') Blake Austin; 1 (73') Jordan Rapana; Goals: 3/4 Jarrod Croker (21', 58', 75')

ANZ Stadium, Sydney
Attendance: 10,078
Referee: Ben Cummins, Chris Sutton
Player of the Match: Blake Austin

==== Round 12 ====
Sunday, 28 May
4:00PM

Canberra Raiders	24 – 16	Sydney Roosters
Tries: Jordan Rapana (13', 23') 2 Jarrod Croker (29') 1 Aidan Sezer (80') 1 Goals: Jarrod Croker 4/5 (14', 31', 69' pen, 80')	1st: 16 – 6; 2nd: 8 – 10	Tries: 1 (9') Jake Friend; 1 (62') Joseph Manu; 1 (74') Latrell Mitchell; Goals: 2/3 Michael Gordon (10', 64')

GIO Stadium, Canberra
Attendance: 14,786
Referee: Henry Perenara, Dave Munro
Player of the Match: Jordan Rapana

==== Round 13 ====
Sunday, 4 June
2:00PM

Manly Warringah Sea Eagles	21 – 20	Canberra Raiders
Tries: Dylan Walker (5') 1 Martin Taupau (29') 1 Jorge Taufua (35') 1 Daly Cherry-Evans (38') 1 Goals: Matthew Wright 2/4 (7', 30'); Field Goals: Daly Cherry-Evans (83') 1	1st: 20 – 6; 2nd: 0 – 14; GP: 1 – 0	Tries: 2 (45', 70') Jordan Rapana; 1 (17') Blake Austin; Goals: 4/4 Jarrod Croker (18', 46', 71', 80' pen)

Lottoland, Brookvale
Attendance: 11,318
Referee: Gerard Sutton, Chris Butler
Player of the Match: Martin Taupau

==== Round 14 ====
Saturday, 10 June
5:30PM

Penrith Panthers	24 – 20	Canberra Raiders
Tries: Matt Moylan (12') 1 Nathan Cleary (41') 1 Corey Harawira-Naera (79') 1 Tyrone Peachey (80') 1 Goals: Nathan Cleary 4/4 (13', 43', 79', 80'); Sin Bin: Corey Harawira-Naera (40')	1st: 6 – 4; 2nd: 18 – 16	Tries: 2 (45', 61') Nick Cotric; 1 (4') Jordan Rapana; 1 (58') Joseph Leilua; Goals: 2/4 Jarrod Croker (46', 59'); Sin Bin: (40') Joseph Tapine

Carrington Park, Bathurst
Attendance: 8,730
Referee: Henry Perenara, Chris James
Player of the Match: Dylan Edwards

==== Round 15 ====
Canberra Raiders	v	Bye

==== Round 16 ====
Saturday, 24 June
5:30PM

Canberra Raiders	20 – 30	Brisbane Broncos
Tries: Jack Wighton (11') 1 Jarrod Croker (14') 1 Nick Cotric (34') 1 Joey Leilua (68') 1 Goals: Jarrod Croker 2/4 (12', 15')	1st: 16 – 14; 2nd: 4 – 16	Tries: 2 (50', 80') Matt Gillett; 1 (6') Corey Oates; 1 (22') Alex Glenn; 1 (58') Joe Ofahengaue; Goals: 5/6 Jordan Kahu (8', 24', 40' pen, 59', 80')

GIO Stadium, Canberra
Attendance: 15,652
Referee: Henry Perenara, Dave Munro
Player of the Match: Benji Marshall

==== Round 17 ====
Saturday, 1 July
7:30PM

Canberra Raiders	18 – 31	North Queensland Cowboys
Tries: Elliott Whitehead (3') 1 Joe Tapine (45') 1 Nick Cotric (68') 1 Goals: Aidan Sezer 2/2 (46', 68'); Jarrod Croker 1/1 (4')	1st: 6 – 13; 2nd: 12 – 18	Tries: 2 (55', 59') Michael Morgan; 2 (13', 74') Te Maire Martin; 1 (30') Antonio Winterstein; Goals: 5/6 Ethan Lowe (15', 22' pen, 56', 60', 76'); Field Goals: 1 (40') Lachlan Coote

GIO Stadium, Canberra
Attendance: 10,266
Referee: Ben Cummins, Peter Gough
Player of the Match: Michael Morgan

==== Round 18 ====
Canberra Raiders	v	Bye

==== Round 19 ====
Friday, 14 July
7:50PM

Canberra Raiders	18 – 14	St George Illawarra Dragons
Tries: Nick Cotric (6') 1 Aidan Sezer (60') 1 Elliott Whitehead (83') 1 Goals: Jarrod Croker 3/3 (7', 61', 64' pen)	1st: 6 – 10; 2nd: 8 – 4 GP: 4 – 0	Tries: 1 (13') Gareth Widdop; 1 (22') Jason Nightingale; Goals: 3/4 Gareth Widdop (15', 46' pen, 71' pen)

GIO Stadium, Canberra
Attendance: 10,977
Referee: Grant Atkins, Chris Sutton
Player of the Match: Aidan Sezer

==== Round 20 ====
Saturday, 22 July
5:30PM

Canberra Raiders	14 – 20	Melbourne Storm
Tries: Aidan Sezer (15', 80') 2 Nick Cotric (65') 1 Goals: Jarrod Croker 1/2 (16')	1st: 6 – 8; 2nd: 8 – 12	Tries: 2 (4', 69') Dale Finucane; 1 (47') Will Chambers; Goals: 2/2 Cameron Smith (6', 40'); 2/4 Cameron Munster (52' pen, 70')

GIO Stadium, Canberra
Attendance: 14,115
Referee: Matt Cecchin, Chris Butler
Player of the Match: Cameron Munster

==== Round 21 ====
Saturday, 29 July
5:30PM

South Sydney Rabbitohs	18 – 32	Canberra Raiders
Tries: Cody Walker (26') 1 Tyrell Fuimaono (50') 1 Alex Johnston (80') 1 Goals: Adam Reynolds 3/3 (27', 51', 80')	1st: 6 – 20; 2nd: 12 – 12	Tries: 1 (9') Jarrod Croker; 1 (19') Joe Tapine; 1 (34') Nick Cotric; 1 (59') Luke Bateman; 1 (67') Michael Oldfield; Goals: 6/6 Jarrod Croker (10', 17' pen, 20', 35', 60', 69')

ANZ Stadium, Sydney
Attendance: 9,112
Referee: Henry Perenara, Jon Stone
Player of the Match: Jarrod Croker

==== Round 22 ====
Saturday, 5 August
7:30PM

Cronulla-Sutherland Sharks	12 – 30	Canberra Raiders
Tries: Sosaia Feki (5') 1 Gerard Beale (50') 1 Goals: Valentine Holmes 2/3 (6', 11' pen)	1st: 8 – 24; 2nd: 4 – 6	Tries: 2 (21', 35') Jordan Rapana; 1 (15') Josh Papalii; 1 (40') Josh Hodgson; Goals: 7/8 Jarrod Croker (17', 20' pen, 22', 40', 59' pen, 62' pen, 65' pen)

Southern Cross Group Stadium, Cronulla
Attendance: 11,639
Referee: Gerard Sutton, Adam Gee
Player of the Match: Josh Hodgson

==== Round 23 ====
Sunday, 13 August
2:00PM

New Zealand Warriors	16 – 36	Canberra Raiders
Tries: David Fusitua (25') 1 Roger Tuivasa-Sheck (57') 1 Isaiah Papalii (79') 1 Goals: Mason Lino 2/3 (27', 79')	1st: 6 – 18; 2nd: 10 – 18	Tries: 2 (8', 73') Nick Cotric; 1 (17') Jarrod Croker; 1 (33') Blake Austin; 1 (60') Joseph Leilua; 1 (65') Jordan Rapana; Goals: 6/6 Jarrod Croker (9', 19', 34', 61', 66', 75')

Mt Smart Stadium, Auckland
Attendance: 10,182
Referee: Adam Gee, Gavin Reynolds
Player of the Match: Aidan Sezer

==== Round 24 ====
Sunday, 20 August
2:00PM

Canberra Raiders	22 – 26	Penrith Panthers
Tries: Nick Cotric (15') 1 Josh Papalii (34') 1 Jack Wighton (45') 1 Joe Tapine (55') 1 Goals: Jarrod Croker 3/4 (35', 46', 57')	1st: 10 – 20; 2nd: 12 – 6	Tries: 1 (3') Waqa Blake; 1 (25') Nathan Cleary; 1 (40') Josh Mansour; 1 (73') Tyrone May; Goals: 5/5 Nathan Cleary (5', 12' pen, 26', 40', 75')

GIO Stadium, Canberra
Attendance: 14,818
Referee: Ashley Klein, Alan Shortall
Player of the Match: Josh Mansour

==== Round 25 ====
Friday, 25 August
6:00PM

Canberra Raiders	46 – 28	Newcastle Knights
Tries: Jordan Rapana (40', 57', 67') 3 Junior Paulo (4') 1 Jarrod Croker (6') 1 Jack Wighton (33') 1 Blake Austin (72') 1 Goals: Jarrod Croker 9/10 (5', 11' pen, 17' pen, 35', 40', 59', 63' pen, 68', 73')	1st: 26 – 10; 2nd: 20 – 18	Tries: 2 (27', 79') Shaun Kenny-Dowall; 1 (30') Jamie Buhrer; 1 (52') Daniel Saifiti; 1 (76') Mitchell Barnett; Goals: 4/5 Trent Hodkinson (28', 54', 77', 79')

GIO Stadium, Canberra
Attendance: 10,523
Referee: Grant Atkins, Chris Butler
Player of the Match: Junior Paulo

==== Round 26 ====
Saturday, 2 September
7:30PM

Melbourne Storm,	32 – 6	Canberra Raiders
Tries: Tohu Harris (19', 78') 2 Felise Kafusi (3') 1 Jesse Bromwich (7') 1 Suliasi Vunivalu (62') 1 Goals: Cameron Smith 6/6 (5', 8', 20', 21' pen, 64', 79')	1st: 20 – 0; 2nd: 12 – 6	Tries: 1 (58') Jordan Rapana; Goals: 1/1 Jarrod Croker (59')

AAMI Park, Melbourne
Attendance: 20,508
Referee: Grant Atkins, Dave Munro
Player of the Match: Tohu Harris

- Green = Win, Red = Loss, Blue = Bye.

== Ladder ==
2017 NRL season
Pos	Team	Pld	W	D	L	B	PF	PA	PD	Pts
1	Melbourne Storm (P)	24	20	0	4	2	633	336	+297	44
2	Sydney Roosters	24	17	0	7	2	500	428	+72	38
3	Brisbane Broncos	24	16	0	8	2	597	433	+164	36
4	Parramatta Eels	24	16	0	8	2	496	457	+39	36
5	Cronulla-Sutherland Sharks	24	15	0	9	2	476	407	+69	34
6	Manly-Warringah Sea Eagles	24	14	0	10	2	552	512	+40	32
7	Penrith Panthers	24	13	0	11	2	504	459	+45	30
8	North Queensland Cowboys	24	13	0	11	2	467	443	+24	30
9	St. George Illawarra Dragons	24	12	0	12	2	533	450	+83	28
10	Canberra Raiders	24	11	0	13	2	558	497	+61	26
11	Canterbury-Bankstown Bulldogs	24	10	0	14	2	360	455	−95	24
12	South Sydney Rabbitohs	24	9	0	15	2	464	564	−100	22
13	New Zealand Warriors	24	7	0	17	2	444	575	−131	18
14	Wests Tigers	24	7	0	17	2	413	571	−158	18
15	Gold Coast Titans	24	7	0	17	2	448	638	−190	18
16	Newcastle Knights	24	5	0	19	2	428	648	−220	14

== Statistics ==
Name	Pld	T	G	FG	Pts
Blake Austin	24	7	0	0	28
Kurt Baptiste	11	0	0	0	0
Luke Bateman	22	1	0	0	4
Shannon Boyd	23	0	0	0	0
Adam Clydsdale	11	0	0	0	0
Nick Cotric	24	16	0	0	64
Jarrod Croker	22	9	77	0	190
Josh Hodgson	23	3	0	0	12
Royce Hunt	1	0	0	0	0
Joseph Leilua	24	10	0	0	40
Jeff Lima	3	0	0	0	0
Dunamis Lui	7	0	0	0	0
Michael Oldfield	1	1	0	0	4
Josh Papalii	20	5	0	0	20
Junior Paulo	23	1	0	0	4
Clay Priest	17	0	0	0	0
Jordan Rapana	23	21	0	0	84
Zac Santo	1	1	0	0	4
Aidan Sezer	24	4	12	0	40
Iosia Soliola	19	1	0	0	4
Scott Sorensen	2	0	0	0	0
Joseph Tapine	22	3	0	0	12
David Taylor	11	0	0	0	0
Elliott Whitehead	23	5	0	0	20
Jack Wighton	23	7	0	0	28

== Representative Call-Ups ==
	All Stars Match	ANZAC Test	Pacific Tests	State Of Origin 1	State Of Origin 2	State Of Origin 3	World Cup
Kurt Baptiste	-	-	-	-	-	-	Papua New Guinea
Jarrod Croker	World All Stars	-	-	-	-	-	-
Josh Hodgson	-	-	England	-	-	-	England
Joseph Leilua	-	-	Samoa	-	-	-	Samoa
Makahesi Makatoa	-	-	Cook Islands	-	-	-	-
Kato Ottio	-	-	-	-	-	-	Papua New Guinea
Josh Papalii	-	-	-	Queensland	Queensland	Queensland	Samoa
Junior Paulo	-	-	-	-	-	-	Samoa
Jordan Rapana	-	New Zealand	-	-	-	-	New Zealand
Maikaele Ravalawa	-	-	-	-	-	-	Fiji
Aidan Sezer	Indigenous All Stars	-	-	-	-	-	-
Joseph Tapine	-	-	-	-	-	-	New Zealand
Jordan Turner	World All Stars	-	-	-	-	-	-
Elliott Whitehead	-	-	England	-	-	-	England
Jack Wighton	Indigenous All Stars	-	-	-	-	-	-

== Honours ==
=== League ===
- Dally M Winger of the Year: Jordan Rapana
- Dally M Rookie of the Year: Nick Cotric
- NYC Team of the Year: Jack Murchie

=== Club ===
- Mal Meninga Medal: Junior Paulo
- Rookie of the Year: Nick Cotric
- NRL Coaches Award: Elliott Whitehead
- Fred Daly Memorial Clubman of the Year: Jeff Lima
- NYC Player of the Year: Mikaele Ravalawa
- NYC Coaches Award: Jarred Tuite
- Gordon McLucas Memorial Junior Representative Player of the Year: Emre Guler
- Geoff Caldwell Career & Education Award: Harry Van Dartel

== Feeder Clubs ==
=== National Youth Competition ===
- Canberra Raiders U20s - 12th, missed finals

=== New South Wales Cup ===
- Mount Pritchard Mounties - 5th, lost elimination final
