= Tyronne Roberts-Davis =

Australian rugby league footballer (born 1997)

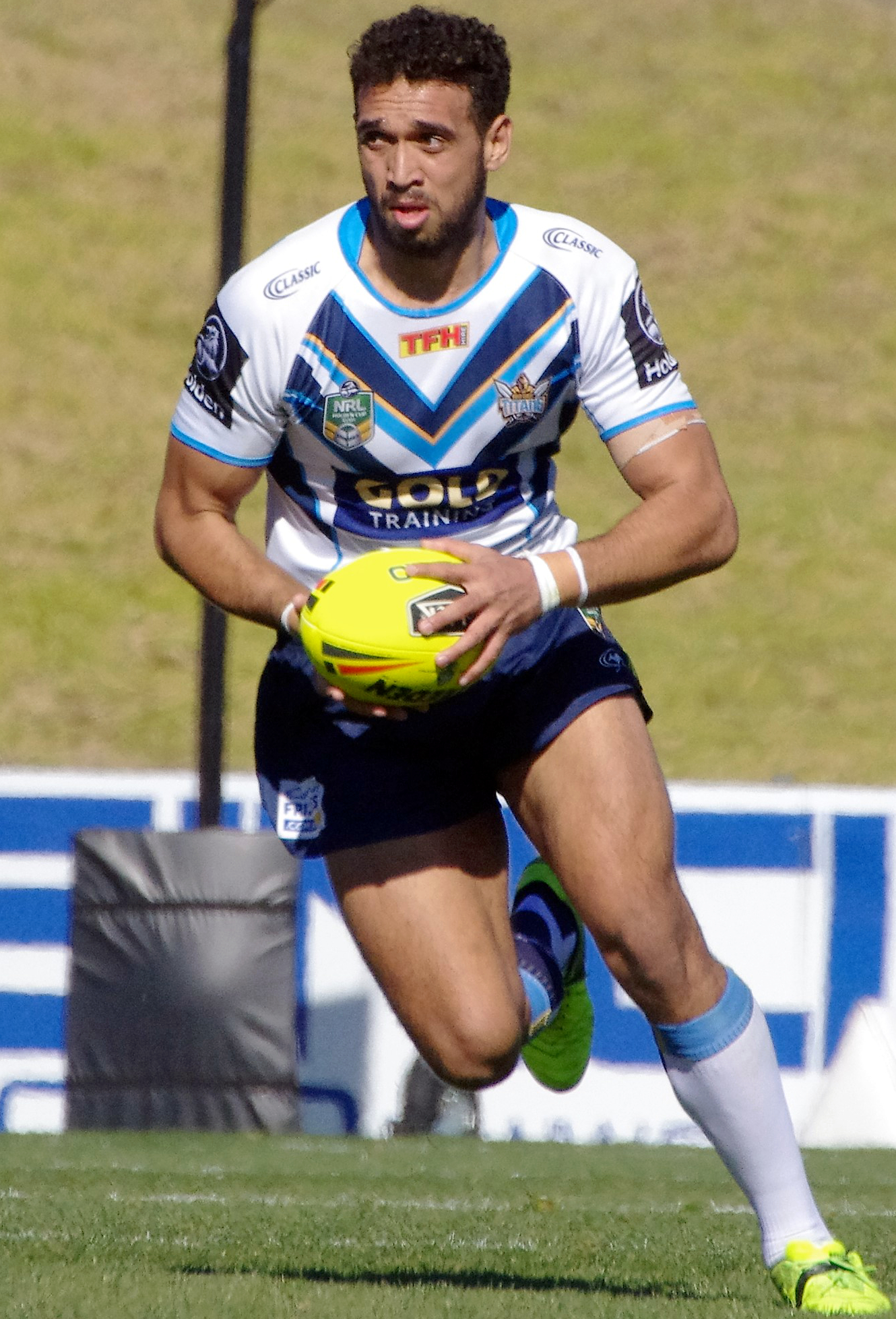

Personal information
- Born: 17 August 1997 (age 29) Macksville, New South Wales, Australia
- Height: 188 cm (6 ft 2 in)
- Weight: 96 kg (15 st 2 lb)

Playing information
- Position: Fullback, Wing
Club
Years	Team	Pld	T	G	FG	P
2017–18	Gold Coast Titans	7	2	0	0	8
- Source: As of 5 August 2020
- Relatives: Amos Roberts (uncle); Tyrone Roberts (cousin); James Roberts (cousin)

Tyronne Roberts-Davis (born 17 August 1997) is an Australian professional rugby league footballer. He is currently on a trial contract for the Wests Tigers in the National Rugby League. His positions are fullback and wing.

In April 2023 he signed to play with the Nambucca Roosters in the Group 2 NSW Rugby League Competition.

He previously played for the Gold Coast Titans in the National Rugby League.

== Background ==
Born in Macksville, New South Wales, Roberts-Davis is of Indigenous Australian Dunghutti descent and played his junior rugby league for the Kempsey Dragons. He was then signed by the Gold Coast Titans.

Roberts-Davis is cousins with former teammate Tyrone Roberts and South Sydney Rabbitohs player James Roberts, and the nephew of former NRL player Amos Roberts.

== Playing career ==
=== Early career ===
In 2015 and 2016, Roberts-Davis played for the Gold Coast Titans' NYC team. Late in 2015, he played for the Australian Schoolboys.

=== 2017 ===
In round 2 of the 2017 NRL season, Roberts-Davis made his NRL debut for the Titans against the Newcastle Knights, scoring a try. He went on to play in 6 NRL matches for the Titans in 2017, scoring 2 tries.

=== 2018 ===
Roberts-Davis only managed to play in 1 NRL game for the Titans in 2018.

=== 2019 ===
In 2019, Roberts-Davis spent the entire year playing for the Burleigh Bears in the Queensland Cup, before joining the Newcastle Knights in November for the 2020 pre-season on a train and trial deal.

=== 2020 ===
After playing in the 2020 NRL Nines and two trials for the Knights, Roberts-Davis secured a top 30 NRL contract for the 2020 season. 2024 played for hometown team Nambucca roosters and won the grand final after first grade 28 year drout On 28 April, Roberts-Davis was fined $10,000 by the NRL after breaking social distancing rules during the Coronavirus pandemic. Roberts-Davis had gone on a camping trip with fellow NRL players Latrell Mitchell and Josh Addo-Carr at Mitchell's farm near Taree.

Roberts-Davis failed to make an appearance for the Knights and was released at the end of the season. In November, he signed with Newcastle Rugby League side Cessnock Goannas for the 2021 season.
