= Nathan Davis (rugby league) =

Australian rugby league footballer

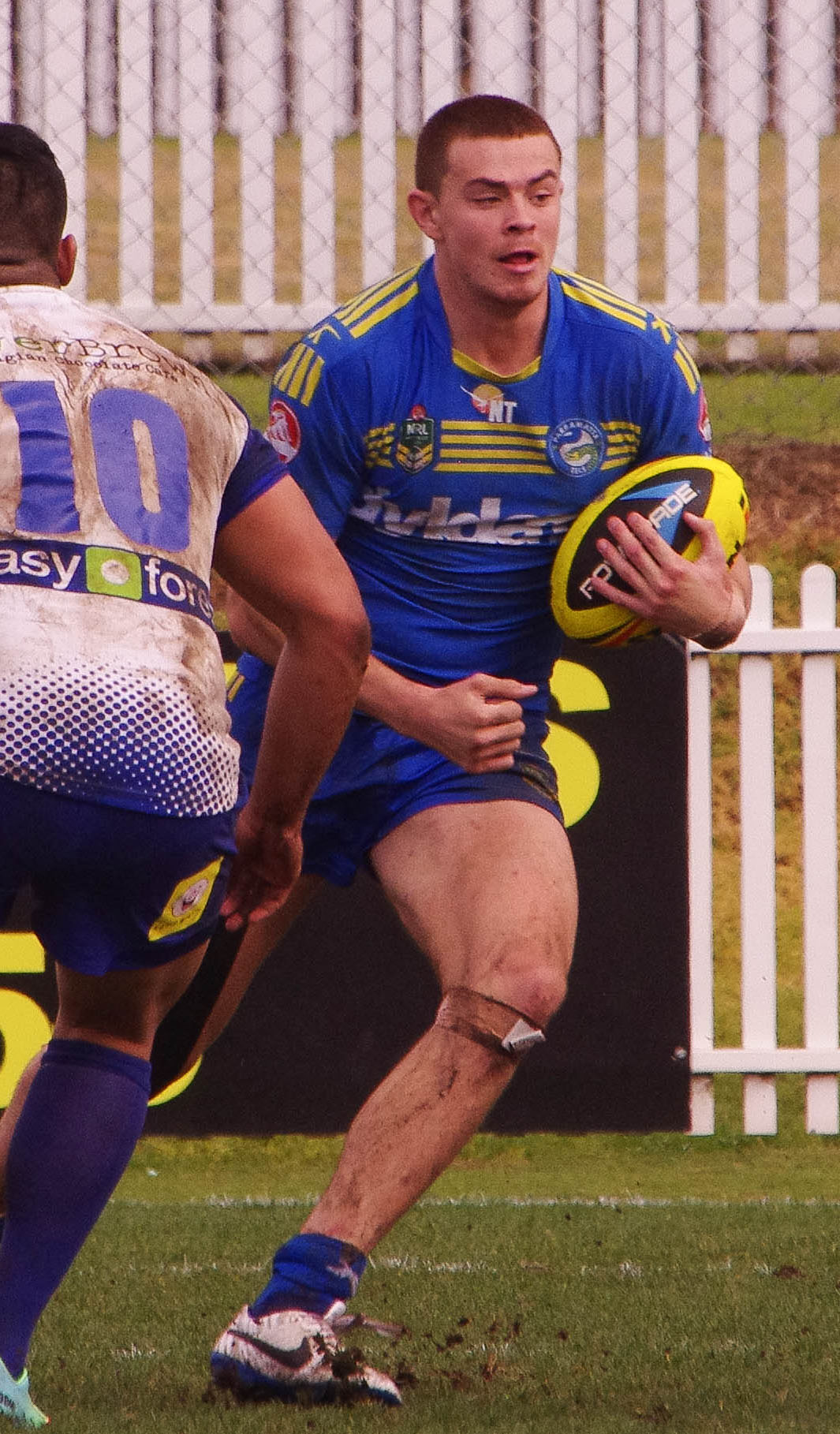
- Davis playing for the Eels in 2014.

Personal information
- Born: 15 November 1995 (age 29) Sydney, New South Wales, Australia

Playing information
- Height: 192 cm (6 ft 4 in)
- Weight: 105 kg (16 st 7 lb)
- Position: Centre, Wing, Fullback
Club
Years	Team	Pld	T	G	FG	P
2016	Gold Coast Titans	8	1	0	0	4
2017	Parramatta Eels	1	0	0	0	0
	Total	9	1	0	0	4

Nathan Davis (born 15 November 1995) is an Australian former professional rugby league footballer who last played for the Parramatta Eels in the National Rugby League. He played as a centre, wing and fullback. He has previously played for the Gold Coast Titans.

== Background ==
Born in Sydney, New South Wales, Davis is of Indigenous Australian descent. He played his junior rugby league for the Hinchinbrook Hornets and Mount Pritchard Mounties, before being signed by the Parramatta Eels.

== Playing career ==
=== Early career ===
In September and November 2013, Davis played for the Australian Schoolboys. In 2014 and 2015, he played for the Parramatta Eels' NYC team.

=== 2016 ===
In 2016, Davis joined the Gold Coast Titans. In round 1 of the 2016 NRL season, he made his NRL debut for the Titans against the Newcastle Knights.

=== 2017 ===
In March, Davis rejoined the Parramatta club after gaining a release from his Gold Coast Titans contract. Parramatta exercised an option to extend Davis until the end of the 2018 season. He made his debut for Parramatta against the North Queensland Cowboys in Darwin on 10 June 2017. Davis made no further appearances for Parramatta in the 2017 season and spent the rest of the year with Wentworthville in the Intrust Super Premiership NSW competition.

=== 2018 ===
In 2018, Davis spent the entire season with the Wentworthville Magpies after being unable to break into the Parramatta first grade team. On 24 September 2018, Davis was handed a 12-week suspension by the NRL and fined by Parramatta after testing positive to "illicit and hazardous drugs". It was the second time that Davis had failed a drugs test at the club. Davis was released by the club following the conclusion of the season.
