= John Olive (rugby league) =

Australian rugby league footballer

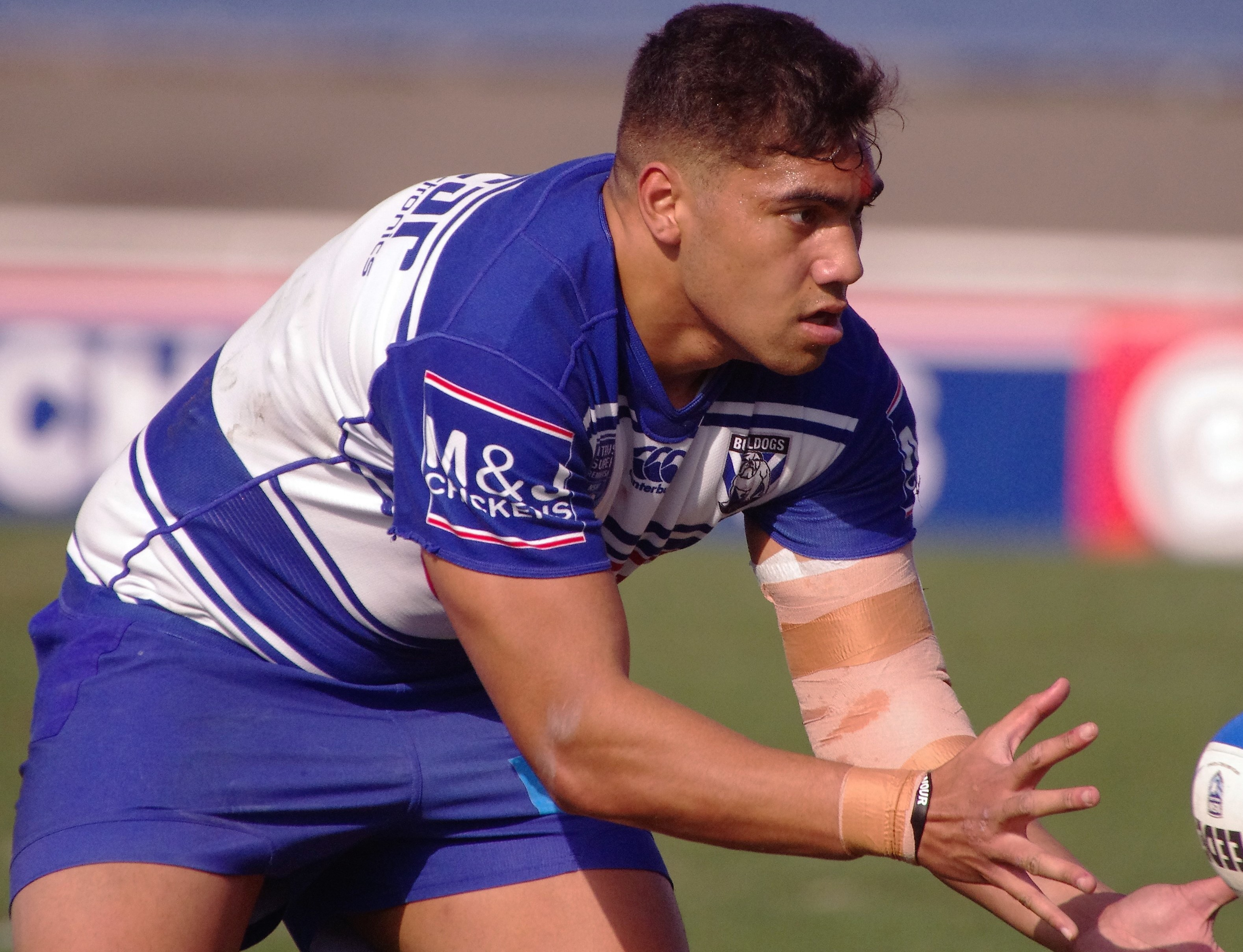

Personal information
- Born: 4 November 1996 (age 30) Sydney, New South Wales, Australia
- Height: 186 cm (6 ft 1 in)
- Weight: 99 kg (15 st 8 lb)

Playing information
- Position: Wing, Centre
Club
Years	Team	Pld	T	G	FG	P
2015	South Sydney	1	0	0	0	0
2016–17	Gold Coast Titans	9	2	0	0	8
2018–19	Canterbury Bulldogs	3	1	0	0	4
	Total	13	3	0	0	12
- Source: As of 12 May 2019

John Olive (born 4 November 1996) is an Australian professional rugby league footballer who last played for the Newtown Jets in the NSW Cup as a centre and on the wing.

He previously played for the South Sydney Rabbitohs, Gold Coast Titans and the Canterbury Bankstown Bulldogs in the NRL.

== Background ==
Olive was born in Sydney, New South Wales, Australia. He is of Samoan descent.

He played his junior rugby league for the Kingsgrove Colts, before being signed by the South Sydney Rabbitohs.

== Playing career ==
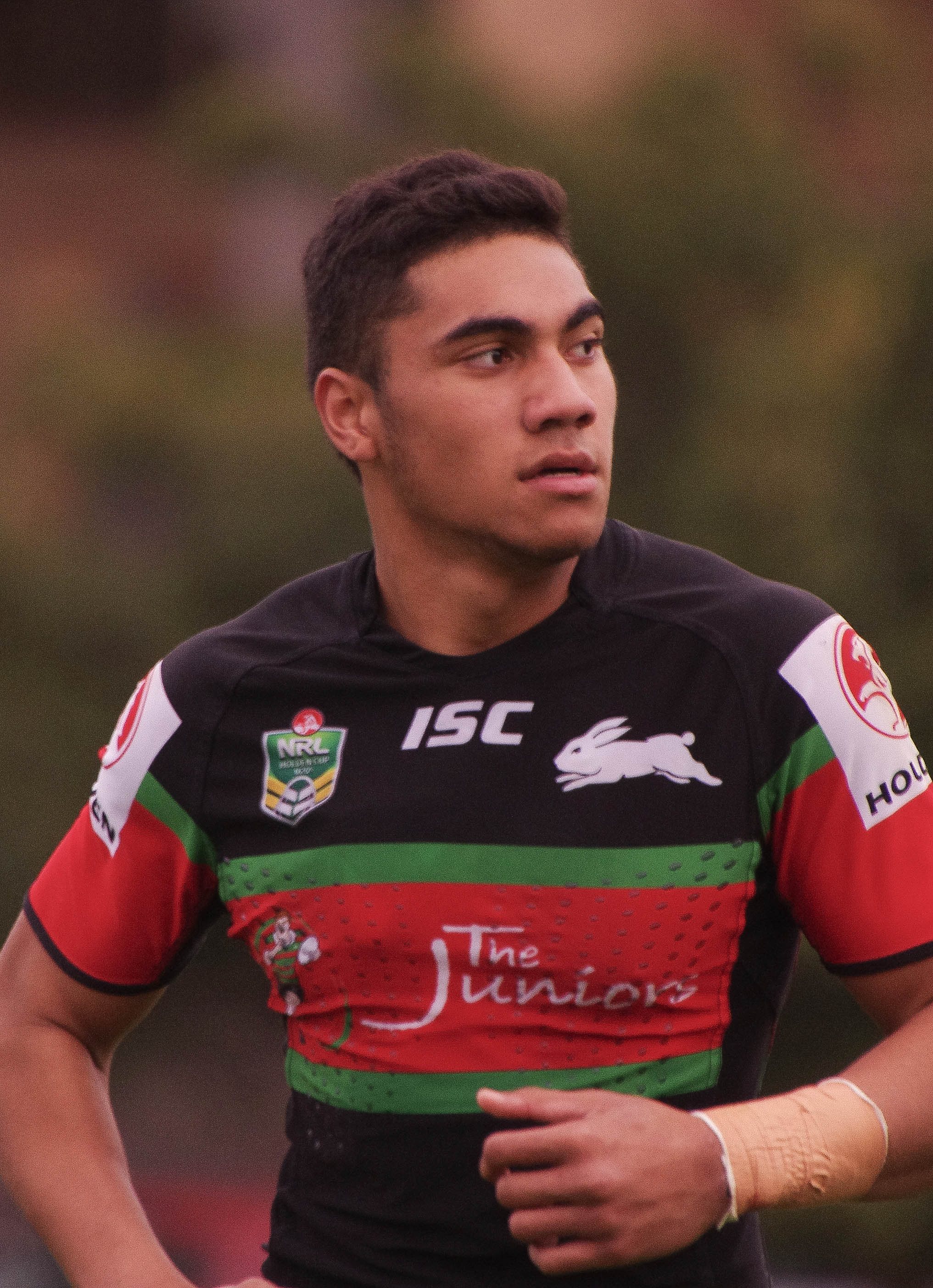
Olive playing for the Rabbitohs in 2014

=== Early career ===
In 2014, Olive played for the South Sydney Rabbitohs' NYC team. In November and December 2014, he played for the Australian Schoolboys.

=== 2015 ===
In 2015, Olive graduated on to South Sydney's New South Wales Cup team, the North Sydney Bears. Olive went on to play 15 games for Norths in the 2015 NSW Cup scoring 10 tries. In round 14 of the 2015 NRL season, he made his NRL debut for South Sydney against the Wests Tigers. On 8 July, he played for the New South Wales under-20s team against the Queensland under-20s team. In October, he signed a 2-year contract with the Gold Coast Titans starting in 2017.

=== 2016 ===
In February, Olive joined the Gold Coast effective immediately after being granted a release by South Sydney a year early.

=== 2017 ===
On 17 August 2017, Olive dislocated his elbow and was ruled out for the rest of the season during Gold Coast's 30-8 loss to Parramatta. On 2 February 2018, Olive signed a two-year deal to join The Canterbury Bankstown Bulldogs.

=== 2018 ===
Olive made his debut for Canterbury in their round 12, 14-10 loss against the Wests Tigers. Olive spent the majority of the season playing in reserve grade for Canterbury and was part of the Canterbury sides which won the Intrust Super Premiership NSW and NRL State Championship competitions.

=== 2019 ===
Olive made no appearances for the Canterbury first grade team in the 2019 NRL season as he spent the entire season playing for the reserve grade team in the Canterbury Cup NSW competition. Olive's final game for the club was the elimination final against Wentworthville which ended in a 26-20 loss with Olive scoring a try in the defeat.

On 16 September, Canterbury-Bankstown confirmed that Olive would be released by the club at the end of the season.

=== 2020 ===
In early 2020, Olive signed a contract to join reigning Canterbury Cup NSW premiers Newtown.
