= Agnatius Paasi =

Tonga international rugby league footballer

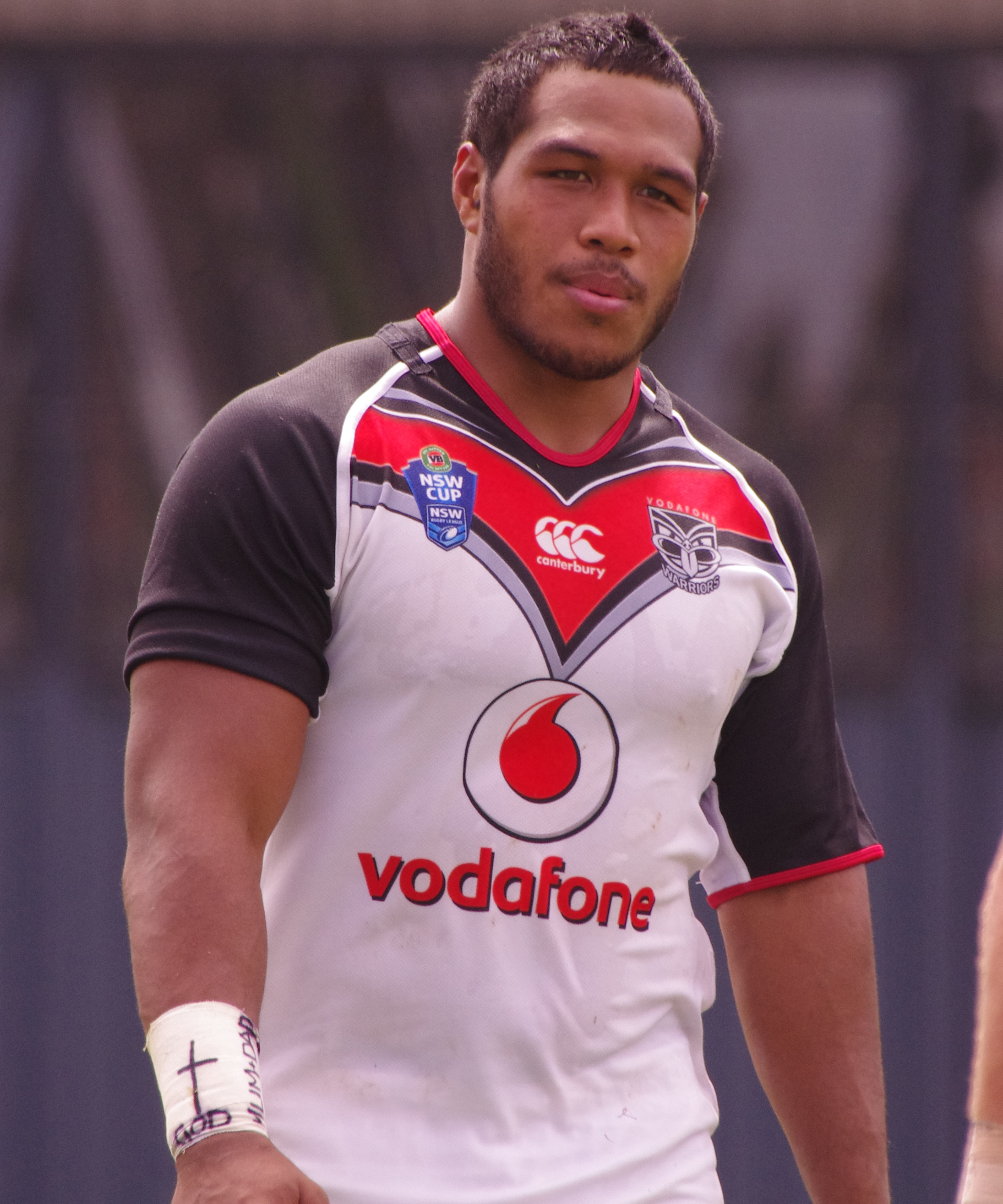

Personal information
- Full name: Agnatius Pa'asi
- Born: 30 November 1991 (age 34) Lapaha, Tonga
- Height: 6 ft 0 in (1.82 m)
- Weight: 17 st 9 lb (112 kg)

Playing information
- Position: Prop, Second-row, Loose forward
Club
Years	Team	Pld	T	G	FG	P
2014	New Zealand Warriors	1	0	0	0	0
2015–17	Gold Coast Titans	54	7	0	0	28
2018–20	New Zealand Warriors	53	7	0	0	28
2021–26	St Helens	112	10	0	0	40
2026(loan)	→ Salford	1	1	0	0	4
	Total	221	25	0	0	100
Representative
Years	Team	Pld	T	G	FG	P
2014	Tonga	1	0	0	0	0
- Source: As of 20 November 2026

Agnatius Paasi (born 30 November 1991) is a Tongan professional rugby league footballer who most recently played as a prop for St Helens in the Super League, and Tonga at international level.

He previously played for the New Zealand Warriors in two separate spells, and also the Gold Coast Titans in the NRL. Paasi also played for Salford RLFC in the RFL Championship on a short-term loan from St Helens.

== Background ==
Paasi was born in Lapaha, Tonga, and moved to Auckland, New Zealand when he was three years old.

Paasi played his junior football for Mangere East Hawks. At age 17, Paasi moved to Australia on a scholarship to play for Keebra Park State High School where they won the Arrive Alive Cup in 2009. He also played some Australian rules football for the school. He was offered a contract with the Wests Tigers under 20's, but complications with his visa saw him return to New Zealand, where he again played for the Mangere East Hawks before being signed by the New Zealand Warriors.

== Playing career ==
=== Early career ===
In 2011, Paasi played for the Warriors Toyota Cup Under-20s team. On 5 October 2011, Paasi played in the Warriors' 2011 NYC Grand Final victory over the North Queensland Cowboys, playing off the interchange bench in the Warriors' 31-30 golden point extra time victory. On 6 October 2011, Paasi was named 18th man for the Junior Kiwis.

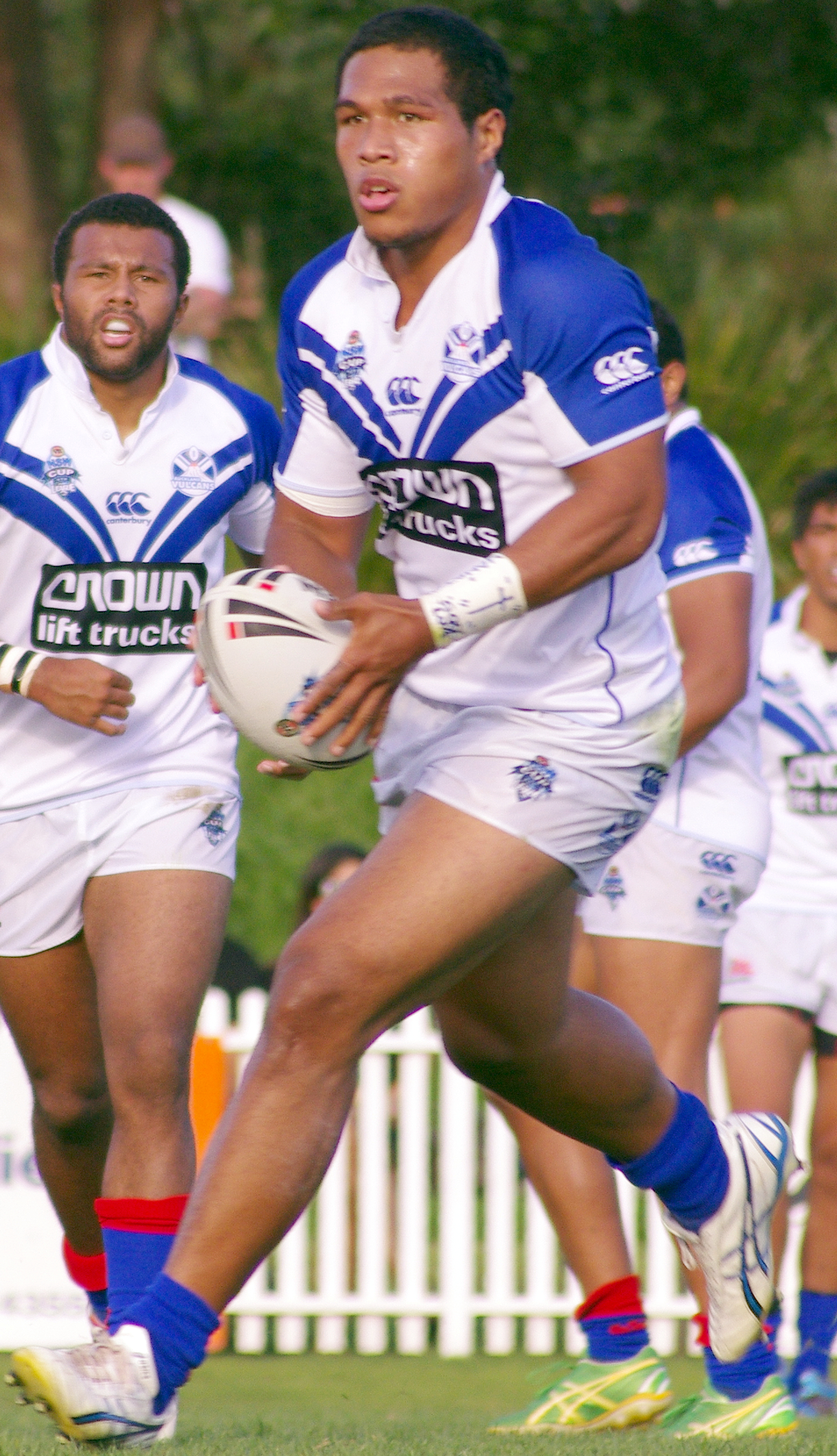
Paasi playing for the Auckland Vulcans in 2012

In 2012, Paasi moved on to the Warriors New South Wales Cup team, the Auckland Vulcans, and he also played for the Vulcans in 2013. At the start of 2014 Paasi wasn't contracted to any NRL team but was given a chance to play in the Warriors pre-season games, earning a contract with the Warriors NSW Cup side.

=== 2014 ===
After a few impressive performances in the NSW Cup, Paasi was handed his NRL debut for the New Zealand Warriors in Round 19 against the Brisbane Broncos, where he played off the interchange bench in the Warriors 28–22 loss at Suncorp Stadium. This was Paasi's only first grade match in the 2014 season. He was named as the Warriors NSW Cup Player of the Year. In November, Paasi signed a train and trial contract with the Gold Coast Titans, starting from 2015. On 16 October, Paasi played for Tonga against Papua New Guinea, starting at second-row in the 32–18 loss in Lae.

=== 2015 ===
In Round 1, Paasi made his club debut for the Gold Coast Titans against the Wests Tigers, playing off the interchange bench in the Titans 19–18 loss at Cbus Super Stadium. In Round 4 against the Cronulla-Sutherland Sharks, he scored his first career try in the Titans 24–22 win at Remondis Stadium. Paasi's good form in the Titans early matches earned him a 2-year contract extension with the Titans. He finished his impressive year with him playing in 18 matches and scoring 2 tries.

=== 2016 ===
In February, Paasi was named in the Titans 2016 NRL Auckland Nines squad, where he was named in the Team of the Tournament. He was described as, "undoubtedly the weekend’s biggest surprise packet" and perhaps the best player of the Nines. Paasi enjoyed a solid 2016 NRL season with him playing in all the Titans 25 matches and scored 5 tries.

=== 2017 ===
Paasi's 2017 NRL season was limited due to a shoulder injury, playing in 11 matches for the Titans. On 5 November 2017, Paasi was released from his final year of his contract with the Titans to join his former club the New Zealand Warriors on a 2-year deal, starting from 2018.

=== 2019 ===
In Round 24 2019, Paasi played his 100th NRL game in the Warriors 10–31 defeat by the South Sydney Rabbitohs at Mt Smart Stadium in Auckland.

=== 2020 ===
On 13 November, it was announced that Paasi had signed for St Helens on a two-year deal starting in 2021.

=== 2021 ===
In round 1 of the 2021 Super League season, he made his debut for St. Helens in their 29–6 victory over Salford. Paasi was knocked out in the second half of the game after a collision with Salford player Pauli Pauli. He was awarded Man of the Match on his Challenge Cup debut, spearheading his team's victory over Leeds.

On 17 July, he played for St. Helens in their 26-12 2021 Challenge Cup Final victory over Castleford. On 9 October, he played for St. Helens in their 2021 Super League Grand Final victory over Catalans Dragons.

=== 2022 ===
On 24 September, Paasi played for St Helens in their 2022 Super League Grand Final victory over Leeds.

=== 2023 ===
On 18 February, Paasi played in St Helens 13–12 upset victory over Penrith in the 2023 World Club Challenge. During St Helens loss to Leigh in the Challenge Cup semi-final, Paasi suffered a knee injury due to a cannonball tackle from Leigh player John Asiata. It was confirmed that Paasi would be ruled out for an indefinite period as a result of the tackle. The following day, it was confirmed that Paasi would be ruled out for at least nine months.

=== 2024 ===
Paasi played 16 matches for St Helens in the 2024 Super League season which saw the club finish sixth on the table. He played in St Helens golden point extra-time playoff loss against Warrington.

=== 2025 ===
Paasi played 25 games for St Helens in the 2025 Super League season including the clubs 20-12 semi-final loss against Hull Kingston Rovers.

=== 2026 ===
On 5 March 2026 it was reported that he had signed for Salford RLFC in the RFL Championship on short-term loan

On 25 May 2026 it was confirmed that he had left St Helens

== Statistics ==
Year	Team	Games	Tries	Pts
2014	New Zealand Warriors	1		
2015	Gold Coast Titans	18	2	8
2016	Gold Coast Titans	25	5	20
2017	Gold Coast Titans	11		
2018	New Zealand Warriors	23	3	12
2019	New Zealand Warriors	23	2	8
2020	New Zealand Warriors	6	2	8
2021	St Helens	21	0	0
2022	St Helens	29	2	8
2023	St Helens	15	1	4
2024	St Helens	16	3	12
2025	St Helens	27	2	8
2026	St Helens	4	2	8
2026	→ Salford RLFC (loan)	1	1	4
	Totals	221	25	100
