= Leivaha Pulu =

Tonga international rugby league footballer

Vaha Pulu
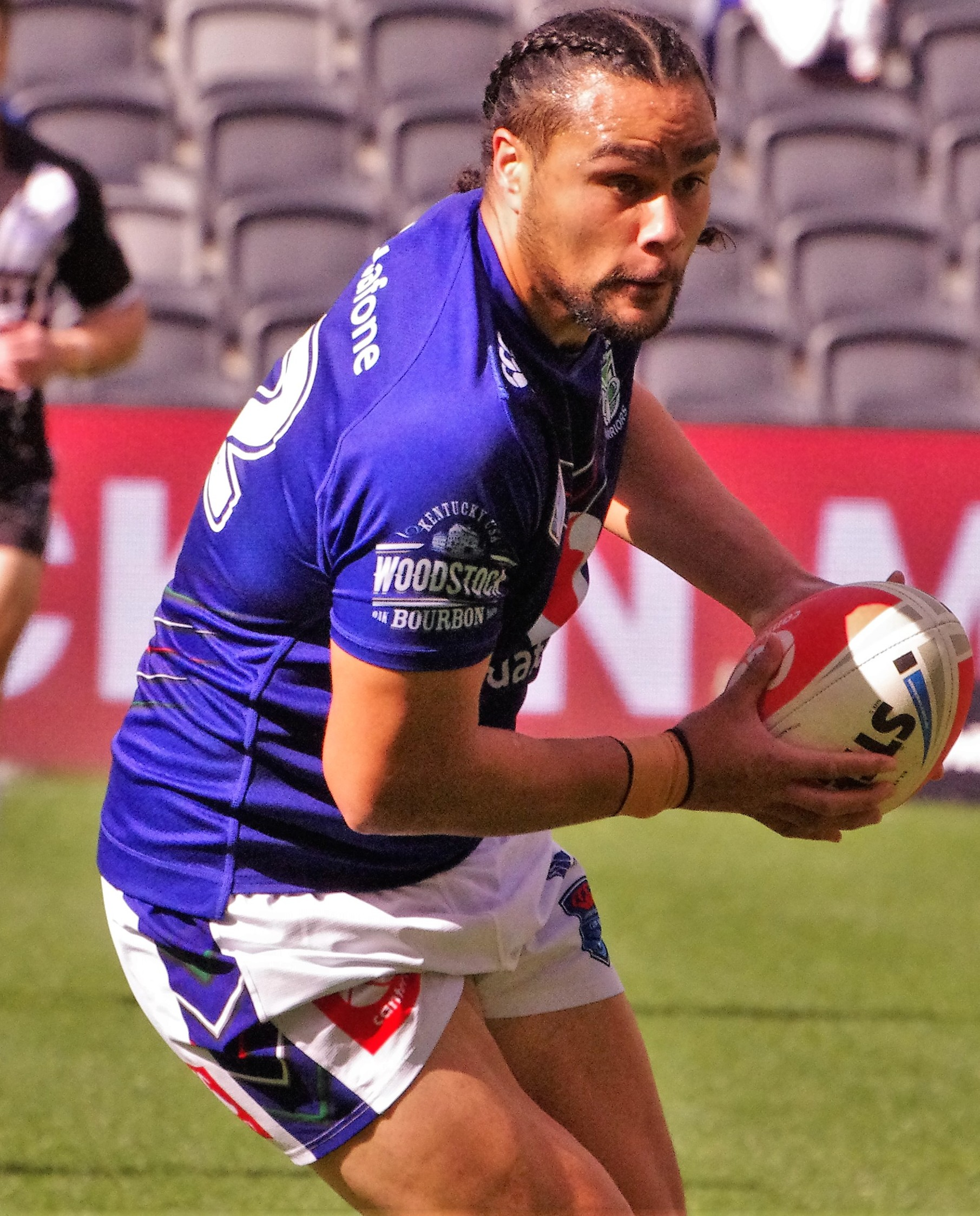

Personal information
- Full name: Leivaha Pulu
- Born: 27 March 1990 (age 35); Auckland, New Zealand
- Height: 192 cm (6 ft 4 in)
- Weight: 110 kg (17 st 5 lb)

Playing information
- Position: Lock, Prop, Second-row
Club
Years	Team	Pld	T	G	FG	P
2016–17	Gold Coast Titans	45	5	0	0	20
2018–19	New Zealand Warriors	13	1	0	0	4
	Total	58	6	0	0	24
Representative
Years	Team	Pld	T	G	FG	P
2017	Tonga	1	0	0	0	0
- Source: As of 19 November 2020

Leivaha Pulu (born 27 March 1990) is a Tonga international rugby league footballer who plays as a second-row, prop for the Norths Devils in the Hostplus Cup and is an extended Brisbane Broncos squad member.

He previously played for the Gold Coast Titans and the New Zealand Warriors in the NRL.

== Background ==
Pulu was born in Auckland, New Zealand. He is of Tongan, Maori and Greek descent.

He played his junior rugby league for the Marist Saints. He moved to Australia as a 16-year-old and attended Keebra Park State High School, before being signed by the Wests Tigers.

== Playing career ==
=== Early career ===
In 2009 and 2010, Pulu played for the Wests Tigers' NYC team, before graduating to the Tigers' New South Wales Cup team, Western Suburbs Magpies in 2011. In 2012, he joined the Windsor Wolves. He had an off-season with Elite One Championship club Lezignan Sangliers before joining the Wyong Roos in 2013. After his 2014 season with the Roos, he was invited to do an NRL pre-season with the Sydney Roosters leading up to the 2015 NRL season, before returning to the Roos for the season. On 27 September 2015, he played in the Roos' 2015 New South Wales Cup Grand Final loss to the Newcastle Knights. On 13 October 2015, he signed a 1-year contract with the Gold Coast Titans starting in 2016.

=== 2016 ===
In Round 1 of the 2016 NRL season, Pulu made his NRL debut for the Titans against the Newcastle Knights.

=== 2017 ===
Pulu was named in the Titans squad for the 2017 NRL Auckland Nines.

=== 2018 ===
Pulu returned from a long term foot injury during the NSW Cup round 10 game against the Wyong Roos.

=== 2019 & 2020 ===
On 2 July 2020, Pulu was released from the Warriors squad that was stationed in Australia and returned to New Zealand during the COVID-19 interrupted season as his partner had been involved in a car accident. At the end of the season, Pulu signed with the Norths Devils in the Queensland Cup after not securing a new contract with the Warriors.

=== 2021 ===
Pulu joined the Norths Devils in the Queensland Cup after being released from the Warriors.
