= Chris McQueen =

England international rugby league footballer

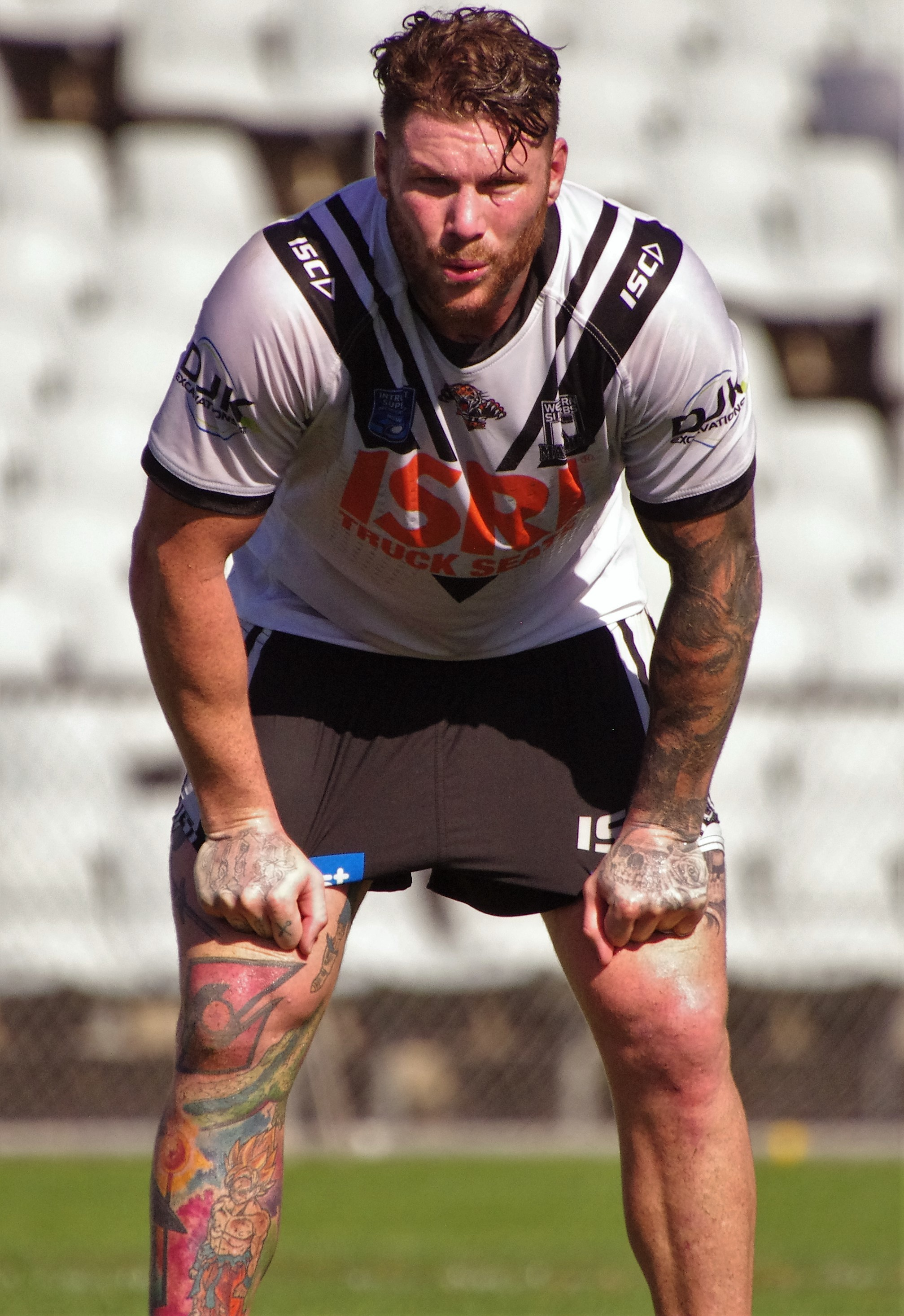

Personal information
- Full name: Christopher John McQueen
- Born: 3 August 1987 (age 39) Brisbane, Queensland, Australia

Playing information
- Height: 6 ft 2 in (1.89 m)
- Weight: 16 st 10 lb (106 kg)
- Position: Second-row, Loose forward, Wing, Centre
Club
Years	Team	Pld	T	G	FG	P
2009–15	South Sydney	116	24	0	0	96
2016–17	Gold Coast Titans	38	11	0	0	44
2018–20	Wests Tigers	10	0	0	0	0
2020–23	Huddersfield Giants	75	33	0	0	132
2024–	Brisbane Tigers	19	2	0	0	8
	Total	258	70	0	0	280
Representative
Years	Team	Pld	T	G	FG	P
2011–15	Prime Minister's XIII	2	1	0	0	4
2013–14	Queensland	6	0	0	0	0
2017	England	1	0	0	0	0

Chris McQueen (born 3 August 1987) is a former England international rugby league footballer who plays as a second-row or loose forward for the Brisbane Tigers in the Queensland Cup.

He previously played for the Wests Tigers, Gold Coast Titans and the South Sydney Rabbitohs in the NRL, winning the 2014 NRL Grand Final with the Rabbitohs. He played for the Prime Minister's XIII and Queensland in the State of Origin series and played as a winger and centre earlier in his career. despite finishing on the losing side with Huddersfield McQueen was awarded the Lance Todd Trophy after being named player of the match in the 2022 Challenge Cup Final.

== Background ==
McQueen was born in Brisbane, Queensland, Australia. He grew up in country town of Kingaroy.

McQueen played his junior rugby league for the Kingaroy Red Ants. He is the nephew of Australian former Olympic swimmer Geoff Huegill. McQueen moved to Brisbane in 2006 to join the Wynnum Manly Seagulls, where he progressed through their Colts system to the Queensland Cup competition. In 2006, his first year playing with the Wynnum Manly Colts side, the team made the grand final, losing to a Norths Devils team that featured future NRL stars Israel Folau and Will Chambers.

== Playing career ==
=== Early career ===
He played 9 Queensland Cup games in 2007 and cemented his spot in the starting side in 2008, playing 19 games. In 2008, he signed a two-year contract with the South Sydney Rabbitohs.

=== South Sydney Rabbitohs ===
McQueen joined South Sydney in 2009 and spent the majority of the season playing for the Rabbitohs feeder team, the North Sydney Bears in the New South Wales Cup competition. He made his NRL debut in Round 22 of the 2009 season, days after his 22nd birthday. A late call up to the side, McQueen played on the wing and scored a try in South Sydney's 36–22 win over the Manly-Warringah Sea Eagles. Due to injury, McQueen missed the entire 2010 season. He returned to first grade in 2011, playing almost every game for the South Sydney side, switching between wing and second row, and was named in Australia's 34-man Four Nations train on squad. Later that year he represented the Prime Minister's XIII against Papua New Guinea.

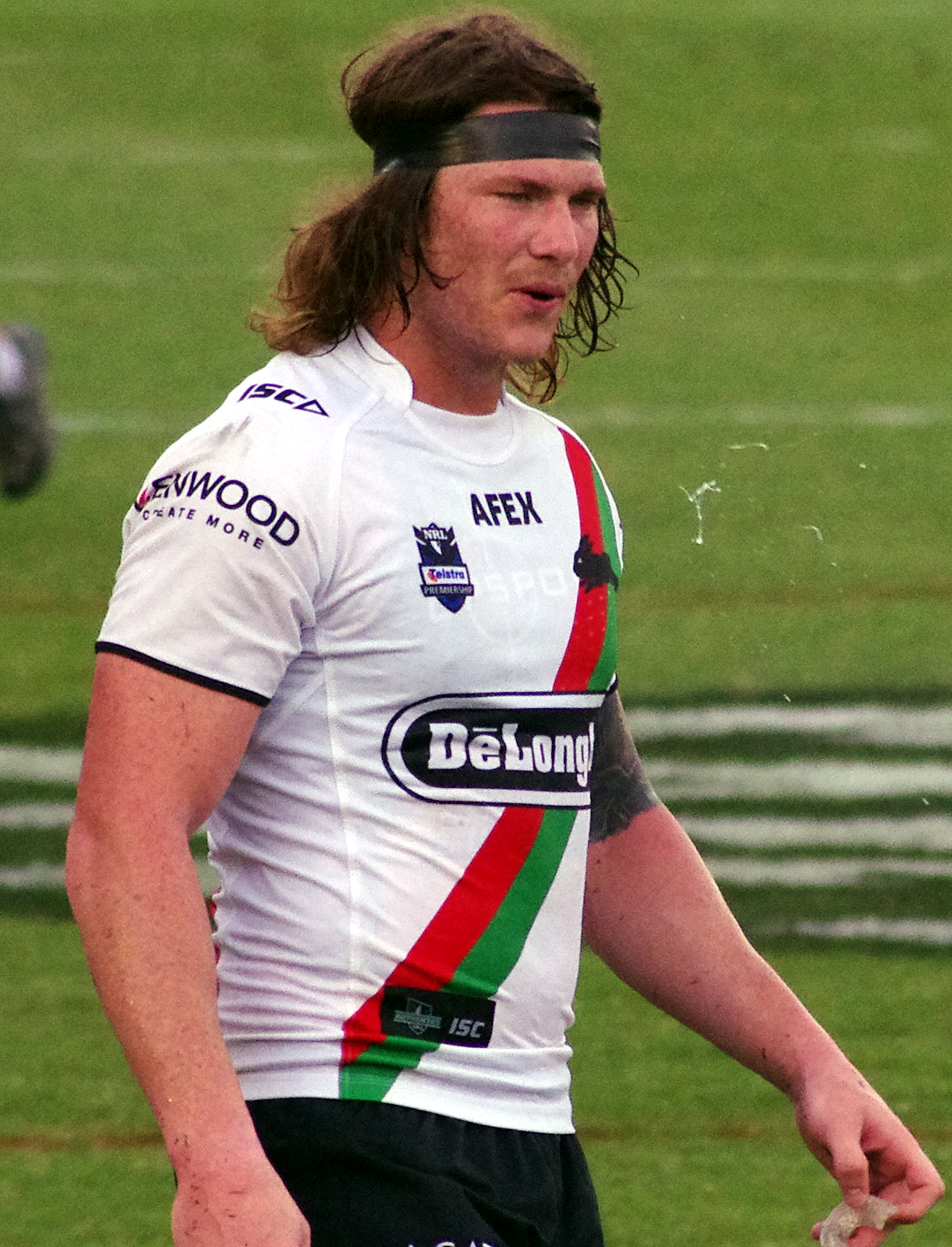
McQueen playing for the Rabbitohs in 2012

In 2012, he began the season again at wing, before making a permanent switch to second row. In 2013, McQueen cemented his spot in the South Sydney starting side. In 2012 and 2013, he was a member of Queensland's Emerging Origin Squad. In 2013, he made his State of Origin debut for Queensland. He played all three games of the 2013 State of Origin series in which Queensland extended their record for consecutive series victories to eight.

On 5 October 2014, McQueen was selected to play for South Sydney from the interchange bench in the 2014 NRL Grand final, helping them to a 30–6 victory over the Canterbury-Bankstown Bulldogs.

On 26 September 2015, McQueen again played for the Prime Minister's XIII against Papua New Guinea.

=== Gold Coast Titans ===
On 11 December 2015, McQueen signed a two-year contract with the Gold Coast Titans starting in 2016, after being released from the final year of his Souths contract.

=== Wests Tigers ===
On 12 April 2017, it was announced that McQueen would join the Wests Tigers on a three-year deal, starting in 2018. McQueen started off the 2018 season playing for Intrust Super Premiership NSW side Western Suburbs after being unable to break into the starting 17 for The Tigers. After spending the first 10 games in reserve grade, McQueen was called up to The NRL side for their Round 11 clash against Penrith.

McQueen was limited to only six games for the Wests Tigers in the 2019 NRL season. McQueen instead spent most of the year playing for Western Suburbs in the Canterbury Cup NSW competition.

On 4 September 2020, McQueen was released by the Wests Tigers effective immediately.

=== Huddersfield ===
McQueen joined Huddersfield in the European Super League following his release from the Wests Tigers. In round 2 of the 2022 Super League season, McQueen scored two tries for Huddersfield in a 26-12 victory over Hull Kingston Rovers. On 28 May 2022, McQueen played for Huddersfield in their 2022 Challenge Cup Final loss against Wigan. McQueen was awarded the Lance Todd Trophy as man of the match. On 18 September 2023, McQueen announced he would be retiring from rugby league at the end of the 2023 Super League season.

=== England ===
McQueen was called up to the England national team by coach Wayne Bennett for the test against Samoa on 6 May 2017. It was the first time that McQueen had accepted England after rejecting an approach for the 2013 World Cup in order to play for Queensland in the State of Origin. The Brisbane-born player qualifies for England through his father.

== Post-NRL career ==
In 2024, McQueen was part of the Brooklyn Kings RLFC men's side that participated in the NRL Las Vegas 9's, a tournament organised as part of the lead-up to the 2024 NRL season opening matches being played at Las Vegas. On 24 January 2025, it was announced that McQueen had signed to play with the Moranbrah Miners in the Mackay competition.

== Statistics ==
Year	Team	Games	Tries	Pts
2009	South Sydney	4	2	8
2011	South Sydney	23	8	32
2012	South Sydney	22	5	20
2013	South Sydney	23	3	12
2014	South Sydney	20	4	16
2015	South Sydney	24	2	8
2016	Gold Coast	25	9	36
2017	Gold Coast	13	2	8
2018	Wests	3		
2019	Wests	6		
2020	Wests	1		
2020	Huddersfield Giants	9	2	8
2021	Huddersfield Giants	20	4	16
2022	Huddersfield Giants	27	17	68
2023	Huddersfield Giants	27	12	48
	Totals	239	68	272
