= Tyrone Roberts =

Australian professional rugby league footballer

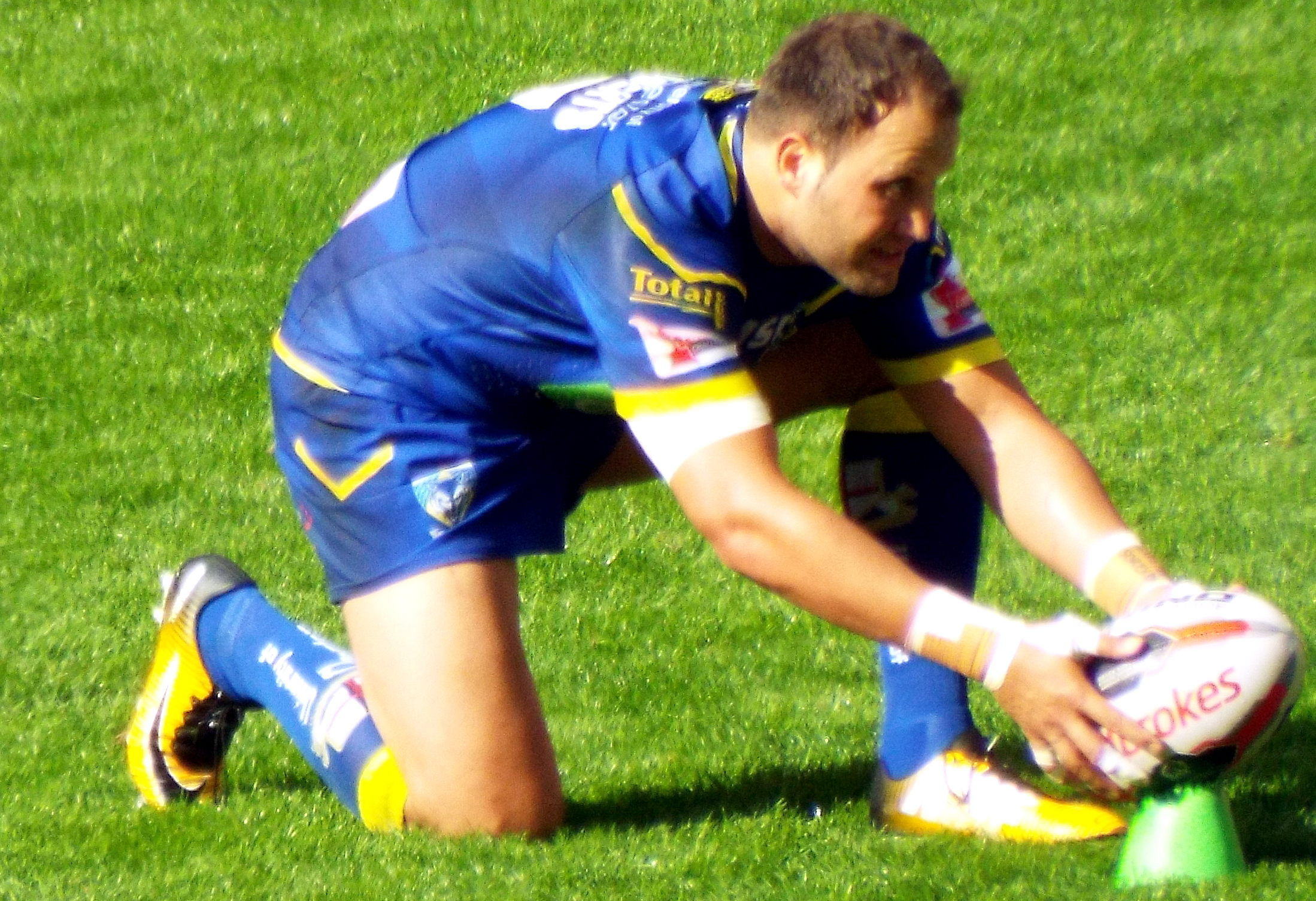

Personal information
- Born: 1 June 1991 (age 35) Grafton, New South Wales, Australia
- Height: 175 cm (5 ft 9 in)
- Weight: 89 kg (14 st 0 lb)

Playing information
- Position: Halfback, Five-eighth, Fullback, Hooker
Club
Years	Team	Pld	T	G	FG	P
2011–15	Newcastle Knights	97	21	163	0	670
2016–17	Gold Coast Titans	41	8	66	0	164
2018	Warrington Wolves	33	6	43	2	112
2019–20	Gold Coast Titans	18	6	15	0	54
2022	Brisbane Broncos	2	0	0	0	0
	Total	191	41	287	2	1000
Representative
Years	Team	Pld	T	G	FG	P
2014–17	NSW Country	2	0	3	0	6
2015–20	Indigenous All Stars	4	0	0	0	0
- Source: As of 18 November 2020
- Relatives: Amos Roberts (cousin); James Roberts (2nd cousin); Tyronne Roberts-Davis (cousin)

Tyrone Roberts (born 1 June 1991) is an Australian professional rugby league footballer who plays for the Ballina Seagulls in the NRRRL as a halfback or five-eighth.

He previously played for the Brisbane Broncos, Newcastle Knights and the Gold Coast Titans in the National Rugby League (NRL), the Warrington Wolves in the Super League and the Norths Devils in the Queensland Cup. Roberts has played for New South Wales Country and the Indigenous All Stars.

== Background ==
Roberts was born in Grafton, New South Wales, Australia and is an Indigenous Australian.

He played his junior football for the Western Suburbs Rosellas in the Newcastle Rugby League, before being signed by the Newcastle Knights.

Roberts is a cousin of the rugby league footballer; Amos Roberts, and a second cousin of the rugby league footballer; James Roberts.

== Playing career ==
=== Early career ===
After being spotted playing in the Newcastle Rugby League by Newcastle Knights coach Rick Stone, Roberts was signed by the Newcastle club. From 2009 to 2011, he played for the Knights' NYC team.

=== 2011 ===
In round 6 of the 2011 NRL season, Roberts made his NRL debut for Newcastle against the Cronulla-Sutherland Sharks, playing off the interchange bench in the Knights' 24–20 win at Hunter Stadium. He finished off his debut year in the NRL having played in seven matches. On 16 October 2011, he was 18th man for the Junior Kangaroos against the Junior Kiwis.

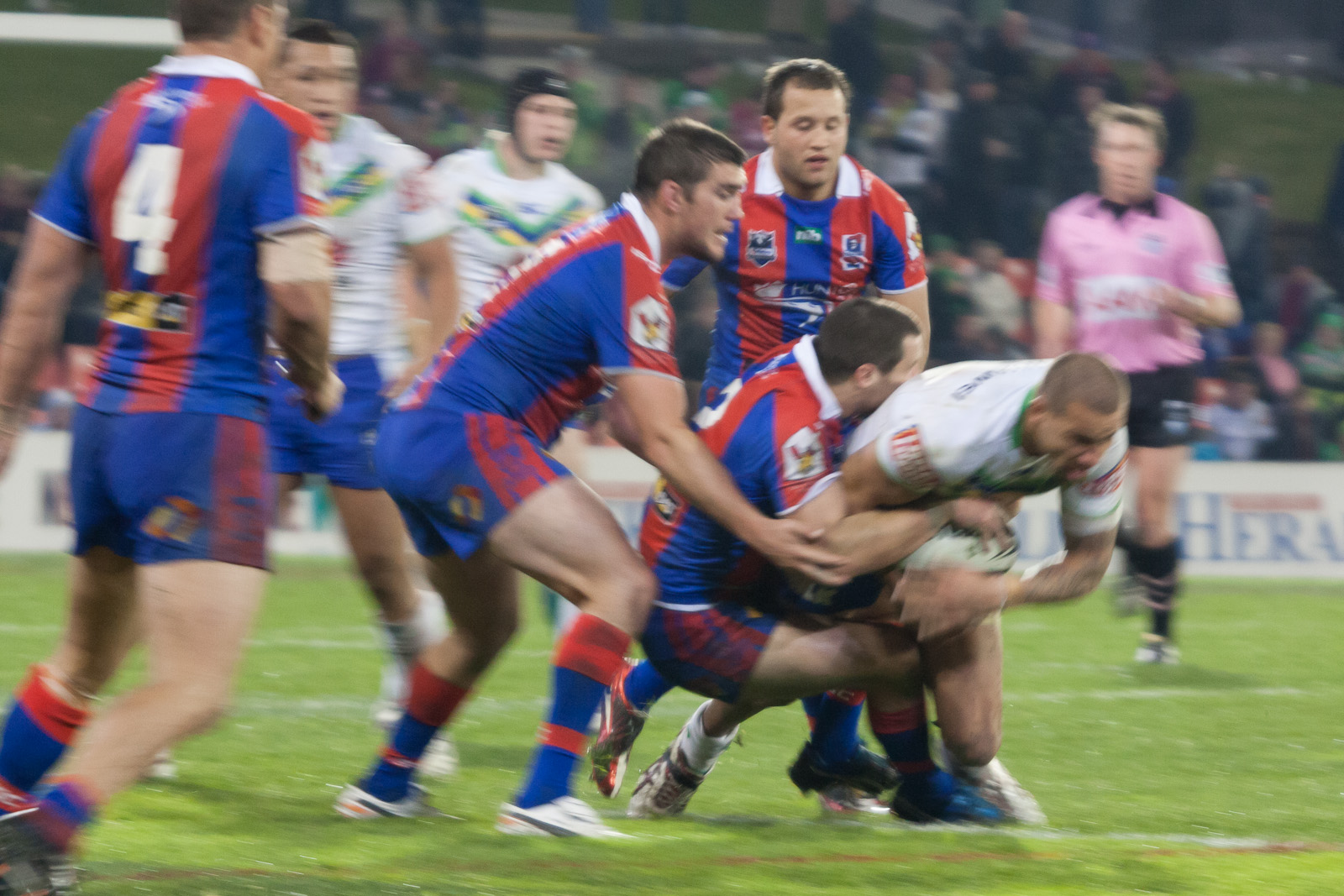
Roberts playing for Newcastle

=== 2012 ===
In round 12 of the 2012 NRL season, Roberts scored his first NRL career try against the Gold Coast Titans, in the Knights' 24–14 loss at Hunter Stadium. On 4 May 2012, he re-signed with the Newcastle club on a two-year contract. He scored 3 tries and kicked 40 goals from 18 appearances for the year.

=== 2013 ===
Roberts played in all the club's 27 matches, scoring 6 tries and kicking 49 goals.

=== 2014 ===
On 15 and 16 February, Roberts played for Newcastle in the inaugural NRL Auckland Nines tournament. He scored the first ever try of the tournament in the Knights' 15–12 loss to the Cronulla-Sutherland Sharks. On 19 February, he re-signed with Newcastle on a two-year contract. On 4 May, he played at halfback for New South Wales Country against New South Wales City in the 2014 City vs Country Origin match at Apex Oval in Dubbo, kicking 3 goals in the 26–26 draw. In the Knights' last match of the season against the St. George Illawarra Dragons, he was sinned binned for 10 minutes after he got into a punch up with St. George centre Josh Dugan in Newcastle's 40–10 win. He finished the 2014 season having again played in all of the Knights' 24 matches, scoring 9 tries and kicking 20 goals.

=== 2015 ===
On 31 January and 1 February, Roberts played for Newcastle in the 2015 NRL Auckland Nines. On 13 February, he played off the interchange bench for the Indigenous All Stars in the annual All Stars match at Cbus Super Stadium. In round 12 of the 2015 NRL season, he suffered an ankle injury against the New Zealand Warriors, ending his run of 79 consecutive games going back to May 2012. After being heavily criticised for his form in 2014 and 2015, Roberts fell out of favour with Newcastle and signed a two-year contract with the Gold Coast Titans starting in 2016, after being released from the final year of his Knights contract. He finished his last year with the Knights having played in 21 matches, scoring 3 tries and kicking 54 goals as the club finished last on the table for the first time since 2005. On 15 December, he was named on the interchange bench for the Indigenous All Stars team to play against the World All Stars on 13 February 2016.

=== 2016 ===
In February, Roberts played for the Gold Coast in the 2016 NRL Auckland Nines. On 13 February, he again played for the Indigenous All Stars against the new World All Stars, playing at halfback in his team's 8–12 loss at Suncorp Stadium. In Round 1 of the 2016 NRL season, he made his club debut for the Titans against his previous club the Knights, playing at five-eighth and kicking 5 goals in the Titans' 30–12 win at Cbus Super Stadium. Roberts was very influential in helping the Gold Coast reach the NRL Finals for the first time since 2010.

=== 2017 ===
It was announced in October 2017 that he would be joining English Super League club Warrington on a three-year deal.

=== 2018 ===
He played in the 2018 Challenge Cup Final defeat by the Catalans Dragons at Wembley Stadium.

He played in the 2018 Super League Grand Final defeat by the Wigan Warriors at Old Trafford.

After only a single season at the Warrington Wolves, Roberts sought and was granted a release to return to Australia for the 2019 NRL season to be with his young family. He signed a two-year deal through to the end of the 2020 NRL season with the Gold Coast. Roberts played in Warrington's 2018 Super League Grand Final defeat against Wigan at Old Trafford. Warrington were looking to win their first premiership since 1955 but fell short for the second time in three years.

=== 2019 ===
Roberts played 15 games for the Gold Coast in the 2019 NRL season as the club finished last on the table after a horror year on and off the field. He also played halfback for the Indigenous All Stars in their 34–14 win over the Maori All Stars in the annual NRL All Stars match.

=== 2020 ===
Roberts played only 3 games for the Gold Coast in the 2020 NRL season as the club finished ninth on the table. Following the conclusion of the season, Roberts was released by the Gold Coast.

=== 2022 ===
Roberts joined the Brisbane Broncos on a train and trial contract for the pre season after leading Norths Devils to the Queensland Cup Premiership. Due to a large number of players unavailable due to testing positive for covid, Roberts made his debut for the club in Round 1 against the South Sydney Rabbitohs, in an 11–4 upset victory over last year's runners up. Roberts played his second game of the year in Round 15 filling in for injured captain and halfback Adam Reynolds in 32–20 loss against Melbourne Storm. Roberts then played out the rest of 2022 with Norths in the Queensland Cup helping them win a second premiership in a row.

=== 2023 ===
Roberts joined Queensland Cup side Burleigh in the 2023 season and played for the club in their Queensland Cup Grand Final loss against the Brisbane Tigers.

=== 2025 ===
On 29 January 2025 it was reported that he had signed up for Ballina Seagulls playing in the NRRRL competition for the 2025 season
