= Ryan James (rugby league) =

Australian rugby league footballer

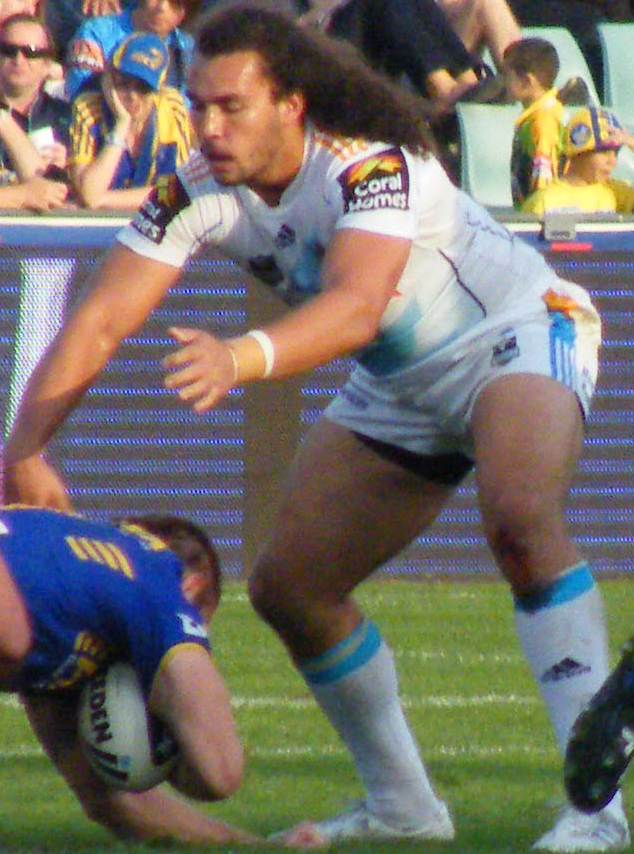

Personal information
- Full name: Ryan James
- Born: 20 July 1991 (age 35) Tweed Heads, New South Wales, Australia
- Height: 193 cm (6 ft 4 in)
- Weight: 111 kg (17 st 7 lb)

Playing information
- Position: Prop, Second-row
Club
Years	Team	Pld	T	G	FG	P
2010–20	Gold Coast Titans	144	30	0	0	120
2021	Canberra Raiders	12	2	0	0	8
2021(loan)	→ Canterbury Bulldogs	2	1	0	0	4
2022	Brisbane Broncos	10	0	0	0	0
	Total	168	33	0	0	132
Representative
Years	Team	Pld	T	G	FG	P
2011–23	Indigenous All Stars	7	0	0	0	0
2013–15	Country Origin	2	0	0	0	0
2016	Prime Minister's XIII	1	0	0	0	0
- Source: As of 12 February 2023

Ryan James (born 20 July 1991) is an Australian former rugby league footballer who played as a prop and second-row forward for the Gold Coast Titans in the National Rugby League (NRL).

He also played for the Brisbane Broncos, Canberra Raiders and Canterbury-Bankstown Bulldogs in the NRL and at representative level for the Indigenous All Stars and Country Origin.

== Background ==
James was born in Tweed Heads, New South Wales, Australia into a family of Indigenous Australian descent (Bundjalung).

== Career ==
=== Early career ===
James played his junior rugby league for the Bilambil Jets. He attended Tweed River High School, where he represented the NSW CHS under 15's schoolboy team in 2006. In 2008 James, who then attended Palm Beach Currumbin High School, played in the school's ARL Schoolboy Cup winning side. They defeated Matraville Sports High School 24–22 in the final with James winning the Peter Sterling Medal as player of the year. Later that year, he represented the Queensland Schoolboys, before being selected for the Australian Schoolboys.

=== Gold Coast Titans ===
James made his NRL debut in round 14 of the 2010 season for the Gold Coast Titans at Robina Stadium. The Gold Coast won 28–14 over the Manly-Warringah Sea Eagles, with James starring on debut against Manly's more experienced forward pack.

He played four matches in the 2010 NRL season, coming off the bench each time. He was named in the 2010 National Youth Competition team of the year in the second-row.

James played in the 2011 All Stars match, coming off the bench for the Indigenous All Stars. James made 14 appearances for the club during the 2011 NRL season which saw the Gold Coast finish last and claim their first wooden spoon.

In round 1 of the 2016 NRL Finals Series, James in the 74th minute of play had scored his 12th try of the season breaking the 76-year-old record of most tries scored by a front rower in a single season.

During the 2017 NRL season, the club endured a torrid time on and off the field with then coach Neil Henry and star recruit Jarryd Hayne reportedly involved in a long-standing feud. Following the club's round 24 loss to Parramatta where it was rumoured that the playing group was split and Henry was about to be terminated, James angrily told the media in defence of the team and his coach "You can say allegedly from an unnamed source and you can say anything, it's BS". The following week, Henry was terminated as Gold Coast head coach.

After being named co-captain alongside new teammate Kevin Proctor, James signed a three-year extension with the Titans to keep him on the Gold Coast until the end of 2020.

In the 2018 NRL season, James made 23 appearances as the Gold Coast finished in 14th position on the table.

James made a total of 6 appearances for the Gold Coast in the 2019 NRL season as the club endured a horror year on and off the field. During the halfway mark of the season, head coach Garth Brennan was sacked by the club after a string of poor results. The Gold Coast managed to win only 4 games for the entire season and finished last claiming the Wooden Spoon.

On 6 October 2019, James was invited to do the Welcome to Country speech before the start of the 2019 NRL Grand Final. As James started the speech he said the words "As a game we stand together, side-by-side … I’m lost". James then stood awkwardly in the centre of Stadium Australia before the Australian National Anthem was played. As a result of this gaffe, one of the Titans' major sponsors, TFH, announced that they would be terminating their sponsorship of the club, labelling it "embarrassing" and "offensive". The following week, TFH announced that they would continue to sponsor the Gold Coast after reversing their decision to end their sponsorship and apologized publicly to James.

On 11 December 2019, James supported the idea of the Australian National Anthem being snubbed for the 2020 Indigenous All Stars game saying it didn't represent Aboriginal Australians. On 31 January 2020, James suffered an anterior cruciate ligament (ACL) knee injury during pre-season training for the 2020 NRL season and was ruled out of action indefinitely. Gold Coast head of performance and culture Mal Meninga said in a statement "Everyone at the Titans shared Ryan's pain today, He is obviously a hugely popular part of this club, and earned even more respect with the positive way he applied himself to his recovery from the original injury last year, without ever once getting down or feeling sorry for himself".

James joined Canberra for two years starting in 2021, subject to passing a physical with his new club's medical staff.

=== Canberra ===
In round 1 of the 2021 NRL season, he made his debut for Canberra and scored a try in their 30-12 victory over Wests Tigers.

In round 12, James was sent to the sin bin for kneeing Sydney Roosters player Jared Waerea-Hargreaves in the head during Canberra's 44-16 defeat. James returned during the game to score a try.

On 10 August 2021, James signed a two-week loan deal to join bottom placed Canterbury-Bankstown. James made his club debut for Canterbury in round 22 against the New Zealand Warriors which ended in a 24-10 loss.

On 23 September 2021, James signed a contract to join Brisbane after being released early from his Canberra contract.

== Statistics ==
Season	Team	Pld	T	G	FG	Pts
2010	Gold Coast Titans	4	-	-	-	-
2011	Gold Coast Titans	14	-	-	-	-
2012	Gold Coast Titans	3	-	-	-	-
2013	Gold Coast Titans	22	3	-	-	12
2014	Gold Coast Titans	4	1	-	-	4
2015	Gold Coast Titans	21	5	-	-	20
2016	Gold Coast Titans	25	12	-	-	48
2017	Gold Coast Titans	22	3	-	-	12
2018	Gold Coast Titans	23	6	-	-	24
2019	Gold Coast Titans	6	-	-	-	-
2021	Canberra Raiders	12	2	-	-	8
2021	Canterbury Bulldogs	2	1	-	-	4
2022	Brisbane Broncos	10	-	-	-	-
	Totals	152	33	-	-	132
