= Anthony Don =

Australian rugby league try scorer

Personal information
- Born: 21 September 1987 (age 39) Manly, New South Wales, Australia
- Height: 188 cm (6 ft 2 in)
- Weight: 100 kg (15 st 10 lb)

Playing information
- Position: Wing
Club
Years	Team	Pld	T	G	FG	P
2013–21	Gold Coast Titans	152	85	1	0	342
Representative
Years	Team	Pld	T	G	FG	P
2017	NSW Country	1	1	0	0	4
- Source: As of 4 June 2021
- Relatives: Ron Willey (grandfather)

Anthony Don (born 21 September 1987) is an Australian former professional rugby league footballer who played on the wing for the Gold Coast Titans in the NRL.

He played for Country NSW in 2017.

== Background ==
Don was born in Manly, New South Wales, Australia.

He played his junior football for the Grafton Ghosts before being signed by the Gold Coast Titans on a two-year contract starting in 2013.

== Playing career ==
He played for the Titans' Queensland Cup team, Burleigh Bears in 2013.

In round six of the 2013 NRL season, Don made his NRL debut for the Gold Coast against the Parramatta Eels. He finished his debut year playing 13 games and scoring seven tries for the Gold Coast as the club finished 9th on the table.

On 13 June 2014, Don re-signed with the Gold Coast on a two-year contract. He finished the 2014 NRL season as the Gold Coast's top try scorer despite only playing 15 games.

In the 2017 NRL season, Don finished as the Gold Coast's top try scorer with 12 tries. The club suffered greatly on and off the field in 2017 as they finished 15th on the table.

In round 15 of the 2018 NRL season, Don played his 100th NRL games in the Titans' 32–10 win at Belmore Sports Ground, scoring a try. Don finished as the club's top try scorer in the 2018 season as the Gold Coast finished 14th on the table.

In the 2019 NRL season Don, became the Gold Coast's all-time leading try scorer surpassing David Mead. Don played 17 games for the Gold Coast and scored eight tries as the club endured a horror year on and off the field finishing last.

On 10 August 2021, Don announced his retirement from rugby league at the end of the 2021 NRL season.

== Representative career ==
Don has played in the Australian Universities Tour, playing in England, South Africa and France.

== Statistics ==
Year	Team	Games	Tries	Goals	Pts
2013	Gold Coast Titans	13	7		28
2014	Gold Coast Titans	15	9	1	38
2015	Gold Coast Titans	16	12		48
2016	Gold Coast Titans	22	12		48
2017	Gold Coast Titans	20	12		48
2018	Gold Coast Titans	24	15		60
2019	Gold Coast Titans	17	8		32
2020	Gold Coast Titans	16	10		40
2021	Gold Coast Titans	9			
	Totals	152	85	1	340

== Personal life ==
Don is the grandson of Ron Willey, a 1950s representative Fullback who coached Manly Warringah to premiership success in 1972 and 1973, before going onto a successful stint as New South Wales State of Origin coach. Willey was the first Origin coach to win a series 3-0 when he led NSW to victory over Queensland in the 1986 State of Origin series.

He is married to former lifesaver Samantha Don and has one daughter.
