= Ashley Taylor =

Australian rugby league footballer (born 1995)

Ash Taylor
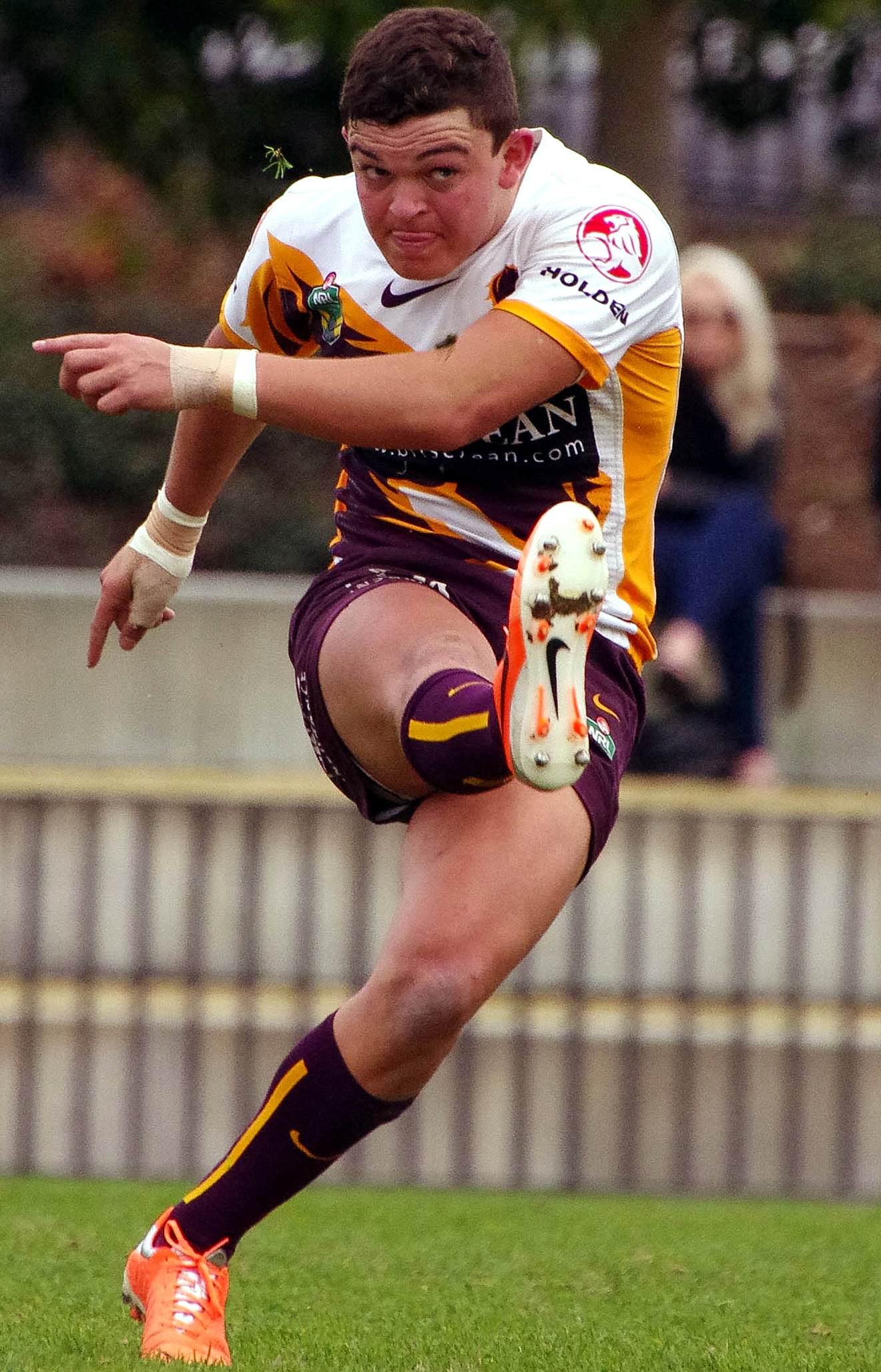

Personal information
- Full name: Ashley Taylor
- Born: 17 March 1995 (age 31) Toowoomba, Queensland, Australia

Playing information
- Height: 181 cm (5 ft 11 in)
- Weight: 94 kg (14 st 11 lb)
- Position: Halfback, Five-eighth
Club
Years	Team	Pld	T	G	FG	P
2015	Brisbane Broncos	1	0	0	0	0
2016–21	Gold Coast Titans	114	18	130	3	327
2022	New Zealand Warriors	1	0	0	0	0
	Total	116	18	130	3	327
Representative
Years	Team	Pld	T	G	FG	P
2017	Indigenous All Stars	1	1	0	0	4

Ashley Taylor (born 17 March 1995) is an Australian former professional rugby league footballer who last played as a halfback, five-eighth for the New Zealand Warriors in the NRL.

He previously played for the Brisbane Broncos and the Gold Coast Titans in the National Rugby League. Taylor played for the Indigenous All Stars in 2017.

== Background ==
Taylor was born in Toowoomba, Queensland, Australia and raised in St George, Queensland until 2006 when he was 10 years of age. He is of Indigenous Australian descent from Yuwaalaraay and the Mununjali clan of the Yugambeh people.

He played his first junior rugby league for the St George JRL. He signed with the Brisbane Broncos when he was 12-years-old and moved back to Toowoomba, where played junior rugby league for the Toowoomba Brothers while attending Harristown State High School.

== Playing career ==
=== Early career ===
From 2013 until 2015, Taylor played for the Brisbane Broncos' NYC team. On 30 June 2013, he re-signed with the Broncos on a 3-year contract. On 5 October 2014, he played for the Broncos in their 2014 Holden Cup Grand final against the New Zealand Warriors, playing at halfback and kicking 2 goals in the 32–34 loss.

=== 2015 ===
On 2 May, Taylor played for the Junior Kangaroos against Junior Kiwis, playing at halfback in the 22–20 win at Cbus Super Stadium. On 8 July, he played for the Queensland under-20s team against the New South Wales under-20s team, playing at halfback and kicking 2 goals in the 16–32 loss at Suncorp Stadium. On 5 August, he signed a 2-year contract with the Gold Coast Titans starting in 2016, after being released from the final year of his Broncos contract to pursue a first-grade opportunity.

Taylor made his NRL debut in the last game of the season against the Melbourne Storm, filling in for the injured Ben Hunt at halfback. His debut came to an end in the 28th minute after he suffered a compound fracture to a finger on his right hand during the Broncos' 8–15 loss at Suncorp Stadium. He was named at halfback in the 2015 NYC Team of the Year and was awarded the Holden Cup Player of the Year.

=== 2016 ===
In February, Taylor played for the Titans in the 2016 NRL Auckland Nines. In Round 1 of the season, he made his club debut for the Titans against the Newcastle Knights, playing at halfback in the Titans 30–12 win at Cbus Super Stadium.

=== 2017 ===
In the 2017 NRL season, Taylor made 24 appearances for the Gold Coast as the club finished second last on the table. The season was marred by off-field problems at the club involving then coach Neil Henry and Jarryd Hayne.

=== 2018 ===
In the 2018 NRL season, Taylor made 23 appearances as the Gold Coast finished 14th on the table.

=== 2019 ===
After a poor start to the 2019 NRL season, Taylor was granted indefinite leave from the Gold Coast club. Taylor's club released a statement saying “Gold Coast Titans halfback Ashley Taylor is taking time out from the game to deal with personal issues. In consultation with the club, Taylor, 24, has today been granted leave until further notice from his training and playing commitments. On behalf of Ashley and his family, we ask the media and the public to respect their privacy. No further comment will be made at this time by the Titans, Ashley, his management or his family". The announcement came in the wake of former players such as Peter Sterling and Andrew Johns calling for Taylor to be demoted to reserve grade stating that Taylor was not living up to his $1 million price tag.

After spending nearly 2 months out of the Gold Coast side, Taylor returned to the team for their Round 20 match against the Sydney Roosters which ended in a 58–6 loss at the Sydney Cricket Ground. On 8 August, it was revealed that Taylor was demoted to reserve grade after Gold Coast coaching staff determined that it was best for Taylor and the club that Taylor be removed from the first grade team, potentially for the remainder of the season.

Taylor made a total of 10 appearances for the Gold Coast in the 2019 NRL season as the club endured a horror year on and off the field. During the halfway mark of the season, head coach Garth Brennan was sacked by the club after a string of poor results. The Gold Coast managed to win only 4 games for the entire season and finished last claiming the Wooden Spoon.

=== 2020 ===
Taylor played 19 games for the Gold Coast in the 2020 NRL season as the club finished ninth on the table and missed the finals.

=== 2021 ===
Taylor made 16 appearances for the Gold Coast in the 2021 NRL season as the club finished in 8th place and qualified for the finals. Taylor was demoted from the team towards the end of the regular season. On 14 September, Taylor was released by the Gold Coast club. On 13 October, Taylor was signed by the New Zealand Warriors on a train and trial contract for the 2022 season.

=== 2022 ===
In round 2 of the 2022 NRL season, Taylor made his club debut for New Zealand against his former side Gold Coast in their 20–18 defeat. On 30 April, Taylor announced his retirement from rugby league due to a long term hip injury.
