= 2016 Parramatta Eels season =

Australia Rugby League Parramatta Eels 2016 season

- NRL Rank: 14th
- Play-off result: DNQ
- World Club Challenge: DNQ
- Auckland Nines: Champions (Won 22–4 vs New Zealand Warriors, Grand Final*)
- 2016 record: Wins: 13; draws: 0; losses: 11
- Points scored: For: 298; against: 324

Team information
- CEO: John Boulous
- Coach: (Australia) Brad Arthur
- Captain: (New Zealand) Kieran Foran (Lebanon) Tim Mannah
- Stadium: Pirtek Stadium (Capacity: 20,741); ANZ Stadium (Capacity: 83,500); TIO Stadium (Capacity: 12,500)
- Avg. attendance: 13,929 (Home); 16,739 (Home & Away)
- Agg. attendance: 167,144 (Home); 401,740 (Home & Away)
- High attendance: 31,815 (24 March vs Canterbury-Bankstown Bulldogs, Round 9)

Top scorers
- Tries: (Australia) Bevan French (19)
- Goals: (Australia) Michael Gordon (71)
- Points: (Australia) Michael Gordon (162)
← 2015	List of seasons	2017 →

The 2016 Parramatta Eels season was the 70th in the club's history. Coached by Brad Arthur and co-captained by Kieran Foran and Tim Mannah, they competed in the NRL's 2016 Telstra Premiership.

== Summary ==
Prior to the start of the 2016 NRL season, the Parramatta club faced the prospect with starting the season on -4 points due to salary cap indiscretions in 2015, however the NRL was satisfied with governance changes at Parramatta and no points were deducted.

Parramatta started the season with a 17-4 loss against the previous years runners up in Brisbane. The club would win their following three matches in a row including a 20-16 victory over the reigning premiers North Queensland. On 3 May 2016, NRL CEO Todd Greenberg announced that the club would be docked the twelve competition points they have accrued so far this season, as well as fined $1 million and stripped of the 2016 NRL Auckland Nines title it won in February. In addition, the NRL also announced that the Parramatta club would not be able to accrue any further competition points until they fell under the salary cap, which they were reported to be $500,000. Five officials, including chairman Steve Sharp, deputy chairman Tom Issa, director Peter Serrao, chief executive John Boulous and football manager Daniel Anderson, were also sacked.

On 9 July 2016, after over two months of club officials contesting the preliminary penalties, Parramatta were handed their punishment with the addition of their for/against points tally accumulated from rounds 1-9 being deducted. At the time of the points deduction, Parramatta sat just outside the top four on the table. Although the points deduction had been handed down, Parramatta were still mathematically able to make the finals if they could win 12 of their remaining 15 games. The first match after Parramatta were stripped of the competition points was against South Sydney at Parramatta Stadium. Parramatta would narrowly lose the match 22-20. It was around this time that star recruit Kieran Foran was released by the club having just played nine games for personal reasons and multiple off-field issues.

On 29 August 2016, Parramatta played their final ever game in the top grade at Parramatta Stadium against St. George Illawarra as it had been announced earlier the club would move into a new ground which would later be known as the Western Sydney Stadium. Parramatta would win the game 30-18 with Bevan French scoring a hat-trick. Parramatta finished the season with a 40-18 victory over the New Zealand Warriors to finish 14th on the table.

== Standings ==
=== National Rugby League ===
2016 NRL season
Pos	Team	Pld	W	D	L	B	PF	PA	PD	Pts
1	Melbourne Storm	24	19	0	5	2	563	302	+261	42
2	Canberra Raiders	24	17	1	6	2	688	456	+232	39
3	Cronulla-Sutherland Sharks (P)	24	17	1	6	2	580	404	+176	39
4	North Queensland Cowboys	24	15	0	9	2	584	355	+229	34
5	Brisbane Broncos	24	15	0	9	2	554	434	+120	34
6	Penrith Panthers	24	14	0	10	2	563	463	+100	32
7	Canterbury-Bankstown Bulldogs	24	14	0	10	2	506	448	+58	32
8	Gold Coast Titans	24	11	1	12	2	508	497	+11	27
9	Wests Tigers	24	11	0	13	2	499	607	−108	26
10	New Zealand Warriors	24	10	0	14	2	513	601	−88	24
11	St. George Illawarra Dragons	24	10	0	14	2	341	538	−197	24
12	South Sydney Rabbitohs	24	9	0	15	2	473	549	−76	22
13	Manly-Warringah Sea Eagles	24	8	0	16	2	454	563	−109	20
14	Parramatta Eels	24	13	0	11	2	298	324	−26	18^{1}
15	Sydney Roosters	24	6	0	18	2	443	576	−133	16
16	Newcastle Knights	24	1	1	22	2	305	800	−495	7

^{1} Parramatta were deducted 12 competition points and their for/against tally accumulated between rounds 1-9 for gross long-term salary cap breaches.

=== National Youth Competition ===
2016 NYC season
Pos	Team	Pld	W	D	L	B	PF	PA	PD	Pts
1	Penrith Panthers	24	18	2	4	2	851	382	+469	42
2	North Queensland Cowboys	24	16	1	7	2	770	520	+250	37
3	St George Illawarra Dragons	24	15	1	8	2	737	545	+192	35
4	Cronulla-Sutherland Sharks	24	15	1	8	2	670	607	+63	35
5	Sydney Roosters (P)	24	14	1	9	2	710	642	+68	33
6	Wests Tigers	24	12	4	8	2	680	541	+139	32
7	Parramatta Eels	24	14	0	10	2	579	562	+17	32
8	Canberra Raiders	24	13	1	10	2	608	694	-86	31
9	Brisbane Broncos	24	11	1	12	2	660	576	+84	27
10	Newcastle Knights	24	11	1	12	2	589	678	-89	27
11	Canterbury-Bankstown Bulldogs	24	9	1	14	2	604	694	-90	23
12	Melbourne Storm	24	8	2	14	2	700	758	-58	22
13	Gold Coast Titans	24	9	0	15	2	627	698	-71	22
14	New Zealand Warriors	24	8	1	15	2	466	680	-214	20
15	South Sydney Rabbitohs	24	7	0	17	2	468	742	-274	18
16	Manly Warringah Sea Eagles	24	3	1	20	2	483	883	-400	11

== Fixtures ==
=== Auckland Nines ===
Match No.	Home	Score	Away	Match Information
Match No.	Home	Score	Away	Date and time (Local)	Venue	Attendance
1	Parramatta Eels	4 – 14	Melbourne Storm	Saturday, 6 February, 12:55 PM	Eden Park	70,000+ over two days
2	Sydney Roosters	11 – 14	Parramatta Eels	Saturday, 6 February, 4:25 PM	Eden Park	70,000+ over two days
3	South Sydney Rabbitohs	11 – 24	Parramatta Eels	Sunday, 7 February, 11:00 AM	Eden Park	70,000+ over two days
QF	Parramatta Eels	12 – 8	Newcastle Knights	Sunday, 7 February, 1:55 PM	Eden Park	70,000+ over two days
SF	Parramatta Eels	17 – 8	Melbourne Storm	Sunday, 7 February, 4:40 PM	Eden Park	70,000+ over two days
GF	Parramatta Eels	22 – 4	New Zealand Warriors	Sunday, 7 February, 6:40 AM	Eden Park	70,000+ over two days

=== Pre-season ===
Match No.	Home	Score	Away	Match Information
Match No.	Home	Score	Away	Date and time (Local)	Venue	Attendance
1	Parramatta Eels	20 – 20	Gold Coast Titans	Saturday, 13 February, 7:40 PM	ANZAC Oval	2,405
2	Penrith Panthers	8 – 22	Parramatta Eels	Saturday, 20 February, 7:10 PM	Pepper Stadium	5,580

=== Home and away season ===
Round	Home	Score	Away	Match Information
Round	Home	Score	Away	Date and time (Local)	Venue	Attendance
1	Parramatta Eels	4 – 17	Brisbane Broncos	3 Mar 2016, 8:05PM	Pirtek Stadium	17,324
2	Parramatta Eels	20 – 16	North Queensland Cowboys	12 Mar 2016, 7:30PM	Pirtek Stadium	12,194
3	Canterbury-Bankstown Bulldogs	6 – 20	Parramatta Eels	18 Mar 2016, 8:05PM	ANZ Stadium	30,018
4	Wests Tigers	0 – 8	Parramatta Eels	28 Mar 2016, 4:00PM	ANZ Stadium	36,112
5	Parramatta Eels	18 – 20	Penrith Panthers	3 Apr 2016, 4:00PM	Pirtek Stadium	15,600
6	Parramatta Eels	36 – 6	Canberra Raiders	9 Apr 2016, 3:00PM	Pirtek Stadium	12,947
7	Manly-Warringah Sea Eagles	10 – 22	Parramatta Eels	14 Apr 2016, 7:50PM	Brookvale Oval	14,633
8	North Queensland Cowboys	32 – 16	Parramatta Eels	23 Apr 2016, 7:30PM	1300SMILES Stadium	19,308
9	Parramatta Eels	20 – 12	Canterbury-Bankstown Bulldogs	29 Apr 2016, 7:50PM	ANZ Stadium	31,815
10	Parramatta Eels	20 – 22	South Sydney Rabbitohs	13 May 2016, 7:50PM	Pirtek Stadium	16,013
11	Parramatta Eels	6 – 18	Melbourne Storm	23 May 2016, 7:00PM	Pirtek Stadium	8,941
12	Newcastle Knights	18 – 20	Parramatta Eels	30 May 2016, 7:00PM	Hunter Stadium	12,856
Bye Round
14	Parramatta Eels	22 – 12	Gold Coast Titans	11 Jun 2016, 5:30PM	TIO Stadium	7,722
15	South Sydney Rabbitohs	12 – 30	Parramatta Eels	17 Jun 2016, 7:50PM	ANZ Stadium	11,860
Bye Round
17	Cronulla-Sutherland Sharks	34 – 24	Parramatta Eels	2 Jul 2016, 7:30PM	Southern Cross Group Stadium	19,124
18	Parramatta Eels	22 – 18	Sydney Roosters	8 Jul 2016, 7:50PM	Pirtek Stadium	8,464
19	Penrith Panthers	22 – 18	Parramatta Eels	17 Jul 2016, 4:00PM	Pepper Stadium	15,251
20	Gold Coast Titans	34 – 14	Parramatta Eels	23 Jul 2016, 5:30PM	Cbus Super Stadium	15,273
21	Parramatta Eels	8 – 23	Wests Tigers	30 Jul 2016, 5:00PM	ANZ Stadium	14,428
22	Parramatta Eels	10 – 9	Manly-Warringah Sea Eagles	5 Aug 2016, 7:50PM	Pirtek Stadium	8,143
23	Brisbane Broncos	38 – 16	Parramatta Eels	12 Aug 2016, 7:50PM	Suncorp Stadium	30,189
24	Canberra Raiders	28 – 18	Parramatta Eels	21 Aug 2016, 1:30PM	GIO Stadium	18,825
25	Parramatta Eels	30 – 18	St. George Illawarra Dragons	29 Aug 2016, 7:00PM	Pirtek Stadium	13,553
26	New Zealand Warriors	18 – 40	Parramatta Eels	4 Sep 2016, 3:30PM	Mt Smart Stadium	11,129

== Players and staff ==
=== First grade staff ===
- This section lists players who were in Parramatta's first grade squad at any point during the 2016 season
- Asterisks indicates player left mid-season
- Caret symbol indicates player joined mid-season
- Hash symbol indicates player retired mid-season

Nat.	Name	Position	Joined	Signed from
(Australia)	Daniel Alvaro	PR	2015	Youth
(Australia)	Mitch Cornish	HB / FE / FB	2016	Canberra Raiders
(Australia)	Isaac De Gois	HK	2014	Cronulla Sharks
(New Zealand)	Kenny Edwards	SR / LK	2013	Southport Tigers
(United States)	Bureta Faraimo	WG	2014	Mackay Cutters
(Australia)	John Folau	WG / CE	2015	Youth
(New Zealand)	Kieran Foran*	HB / FE	2016	Manly Sea Eagles
(Australia)	Bevan French	FB	2016	Youth
(Australia)	Tyrell Fuimaono	CE / SR	2016	Youth
(Australia)	Michael Gordon	FB / CE / WG	2016	Cronulla Sharks
(Australia)	David Gower	SR / LK / PR	2014	Manly Sea Eagles
(Australia)	Clinton Gutherson	FB / CE / WG	2016	Manly Sea Eagles
(Ireland)	James Hasson	SR / PR	2016	Manly Sea Eagles
(Australia)	Michael Jennings	CE	2016	Sydney Roosters
(Australia)	Luke Kelly	HB / FE / HK	2012	Melbourne Storm
(Australia)	Cameron King	HK	2016	North Queensland Cowboys
(New Zealand)	Manu Ma'u	SR	2014	Wentworthville Magpies
(Australia)	Tim Mannah	PR	2009	Youth
(Cook Islands)	Tepai Moeroa	SR	2014	Youth
(Australia)	Ryan Morgan*	CE	2011	Youth
(Australia)	Kieren Moss*	FB	2016	Penrith Panthers
(Australia)	Cody Nelson	SR / FE	2015	Gold Coast Titans
(Australia)	Corey Norman	FE / FB	2014	Brisbane Broncos
(Australia)	Rory O'Brien	PR	2016	St George Illawarra Dragons
(Samoa)	Junior Paulo*	SR / CE	2016	Youth
(Australia)	Nathan Peats*	HK / LK	2014	South Sydney Rabbitohs
(Australia)	Kaysa Pritchard	HK	2013	Youth
(Australia)	Semi Radradra	WG	2013	Youth
(Australia)	Jeff Robson^	HB / FE / HK	2016	New Zealand Warriors
(Australia)	Scott Schulte	WG	2016	North Queensland Cowboys
(Australia)	Beau Scott	SR / CE	2016	Newcastle Knights
(New Zealand)	Brad Takairangi	SR / CE	2015	Gold Coast Titans
(Australia)	Kelepi Tanginoa	SR / LK	2016	North Queensland Cowboys
(Tonga)	Peni Terepo	PR / SR / LK	2013	Youth
(Australia)	Vai Toutai	CE / WG	2013	Youth
(Australia)	Honeti Tuha	WG	2016	Newcastle Knights
(Australia)	Alex Twal	PR	2016	Youth
(Australia)	Joseph Ualesi	SR / LK	2013	Youth
(Australia)	Anthony Watmough	SR / LK	2015	Manly Sea Eagles
(Australia)	Danny Wicks	PR / SR	2015	Unattached
(Australia)	Matthew Woods	LK / SR	2016	Wests Tigers

=== Coaching staff ===
- This section lists members of staff who were in Parramatta's first grade squad at any point during the 2016 season
- Asterisks indicate member of staff left mid-season

Position	Nat.	Name
Head coach	(Australia)	Brad Arthur
Assistant coach	(Australia)	Peter Gentle
Assistant coach	(Australia)	Steve Murphy
Chief Medical Officer	(Australia)	Dr Louis Shidiak
Physical Performance Manager	(Australia)	Paul Devlin
Strength coach	(Australia)	Jarrod Wade
Contact Coach	(Australia)	Brett O'Farrell
Head Trainer	(Australia)	Craig Sultana
Assistant NRL Strength and Conditioning Coach	(Australia)	Nathan Beutel
NYC Head of Strength and Conditioning	(Australia)	Nathan Beutel
Video analyst	(Australia)	Craig Crossman
NSW Cup Head Coach and Development Coach	(Australia)	Joey Grima
Under 20's Head Coach	(Australia)	Luke Burt

== Transfers ==
In:

Nat.	Pos.	Name	From	Ref.
(Australia)	HB	Mitch Cornish	Canberra Raiders
(New Zealand)	FE	Kieran Foran	Manly Sea Eagles
(Australia)	FB	Michael Gordon	Cronulla Sharks
(Republic of Ireland)	PR	James Hasson	Manly Sea Eagles
(Australia)	HK	Cameron King	North Queensland Cowboys
(Australia)	FB	Kieren Moss	Penrith Panthers
(Australia)	PR	Rory O'Brien	St George Illawarra Dragons
(Australia)	SR	Beau Scott	Newcastle Knights
(Australia)	SR	Kelepi Tanginoa	North Queensland Cowboys
(Australia)	CE	Scott Schulte	North Queensland Cowboys
(Australia)	FB	Clinton Gutherson	Manly Sea Eagles
(Australia)	SR	Matthew Woods	Wests Tigers
(Australia)	CE	Michael Jennings	Sydney Roosters
(Australia)	PR	Alex Twal	Youth
(Australia)	FB	Bevan French	Youth
(Australia)	CE	Tyrell Fuimaono	Youth
(Australia)	HB	Jeff Robson (mid-season)	New Zealand Warriors

Out:

Nat.	Pos.	Name	To	Ref.
(Australia)	CE	Beau Champion	Retired
(England)	CE	Ben Crooks	Castleford Tigers
(New Zealand)	HB	Zach Dockar-Clay	Penrith Panthers
(Tonga)	PR	Richard Fa'aoso	Retired
(Fiji)	SR	Fabian Goodall	Manly Sea Eagles
(Fiji)	SR	Tui Kamikamica	Rugby union
(Australia)	PR	Darcy Lussick	Manly Sea Eagles
(Australia)	FE	Ryan Matterson	Sydney Roosters
(Australia)	FE	Adam Quinlan	St. Helens
(Lebanon)	FB	Reece Robinson	Rugby union
(Australia)	HB	Chris Sandow	Warrington Wolves
(United States)	LK	Joseph Paulo	Cronulla Sharks
(New Zealand)	SR	Josh Aloiai	Wests Tigers
(Australia)	WG	Halauafu Lavaka	Manly Sea Eagles
(Cook Islands)	PR	Eric Newbigging	Illawarra Cutters
(Samoa)	SR	Pauli Pauli	Newcastle Knights
(Australia)	CE	Ryan Morgan (mid-season)	Melbourne Storm
(Australia)	FB	Kieren Moss (mid-season)	Bradford Bulls
(Samoa)	SR	Junior Paulo (mid-season)	Canberra Raiders
(Australia)	HK	Nathan Peats (mid-season)	Gold Coast Titans
(New Zealand)	FE	Kieran Foran (mid-season)	Released

== Representative call-ups ==
=== Domestic ===
Player	Team	Call-up
Semi Radradra	World All Stars	2016 All Stars Match
Beau Scott	World All Stars	2016 All Stars Match
Clinton Gutherson	NSW City	2016 City vs Country Origin
Nathan Peats	NSW City	2016 City vs Country Origin
Michael Jennings	New South Wales	2016 State of Origin Series

=== International ===
Player	Team	Call-up
Semi Radradra	Australia	2016 Anzac Test
Manu Ma'u	New Zealand	2016 Anzac Test
Brad Takairangi (18th man)	New Zealand	2016 Anzac Test
Vai Toutai	Tonga	2016 Polynesian Cup
Peni Terepo	Tonga	2016 Polynesian Cup
Junior Paulo	Samoa	2016 Polynesian Cup
Kaysa Pritchard	Samoa	2016 Polynesian Cup
Kaysa Pritchard	Samoa	v Fiji, 8 October 2016
Manu Ma'u	New Zealand	v Australia, 15 October 2016
Manu Ma'u	New Zealand	2016 Four Nations
James Hasson	(Republic of Ireland) Ireland	2017 World Cup Qualifiers
