= 2016 Brisbane Broncos season =

National Rugby League team season

Coordinates: 27°27′53″S 153°0′34″E

- NRL rank: 5th
- Play-off result: Lost Semi Final (North Queensland Cowboys, 20-26)
- World Club Series: Won Game 2, (Wigan Warriors, 42-12)
- 2016 record: Wins: 17; losses: 10
- Points scored: For: 554; against: 434

Team information
- CEO: Paul White
- Head Coach: Wayne Bennett
- Captain: Corey Parker
- Stadium: Suncorp Stadium - 52,500
- Avg. attendance: 33,692
- Agg. attendance: 404,306
- High attendance: 46,176 (North Queensland Cowboys, 25 March)
- Low attendance: 25,021 (Canberra Raiders, 9 June)

Top scorers
- Tries: Corey Oates (20)
- Goals: Corey Parker (51)
- Points: Jordan Kahu (146)
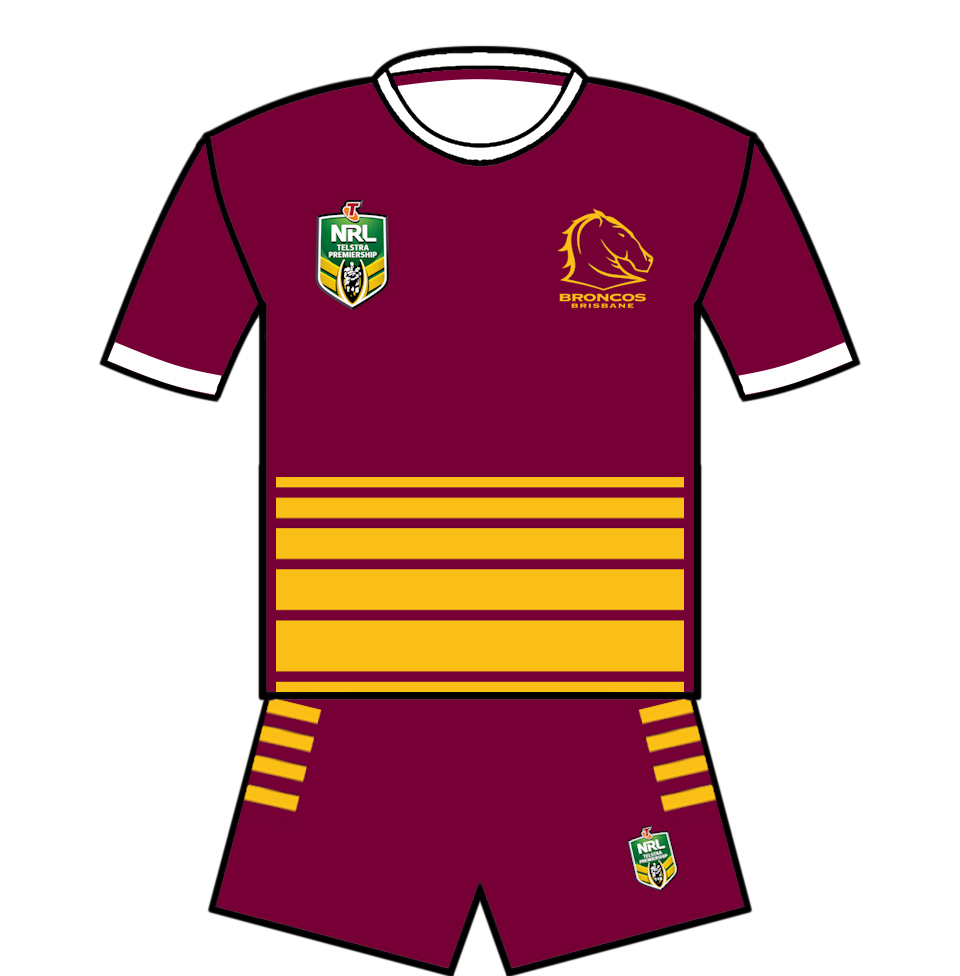
Home colours
← 2015	List of seasons	2017 →

The 2016 Brisbane Broncos season is the 29th in the club's history. This rugby league team is based in Brisbane, Queensland, Australia. Coached by Wayne Bennett, and captained by Corey Parker, they compete in the NRL's 2016 Telstra Premiership. Prior to the start of the Premiership season, the Broncos competed in the 2016 Auckland Nines, finishing last in their pool. During the mid-season 2016 State of Origin series six Broncos players were selected for Queensland.

== Season summary ==
=== Milestones ===
- Round 1: Greg Eden made his first grade debut
- Round 1: James Roberts made his debut for the club.
- Round 3: Jarrod Wallace played his 50th career game.
- Round 7: Joe Ofahengaue Scored his 1st career try.
- Round 8: Herman Ese'ese made his debut for the club
- Round 9: Darius Boyd played his 100th game for the club.
- Round 10: Jai Arrow made his first grade debut.
- Round 10: Ben Hunt played his 150th career game.
- Round 12: Greg Eden scored his 1st career try.
- Round 12: Tevita Pangai Junior made his first grade debut.
- Round 12: Jaydn Su'A made his first grade debut.
- Round 13: Tevita Pangai Junior scored his first career try.
- Round 16: Tom Opacic made his first grade debut.
- Round 21: Tom Opacic scored his 1st career try,
- Round 23: Jonus Pearson made his first grade debut.
- Round 23: Jonus Pearson scored his 1st and 2nd career tries.
- Round 25: Jai Arrow scored his 1st career try.
- Round 25: Matt Gillett played his 150th career game.
- Round 25: Anthony Milford played his 50th career game for the club.
- Round 25: Sam Thaiday played his 250th career game.
- Semi-final: Corey Parker played his final career game.

== Squad List ==
As of 16 September 2016

Cap.	Nat.	Player	Position	First Broncos game	Previous First Grade RL club
106	(Australia)	Corey Parker (c)	Lock	2001	—N/a
128	(Australia)	Sam Thaiday	Second-row	2003	—N/a
141	(Australia)	Darius Boyd	Fullback	2006	(Australia) Newcastle Knights
163	(Australia)	Andrew McCullough	Hooker	2008	—N/a
172	(New Zealand)	Alex Glenn	Second-row	2009	—N/a
174	(Australia)	Josh McGuire	Prop	2009	—N/a
178	(Australia)	Ben Hunt	Halfback	2009	—N/a
182	(Australia)	Matt Gillett	Second-row	2010	—N/a
190	(England)	Jack Reed	Centre	2011	—N/a
195	(Australia)	Lachlan Maranta	Wing	2012	—N/a
196	(Australia)	Jarrod Wallace	Prop	2012	—N/a
198	(Australia)	Aaron Whitchurch	Centre	2012	—N/a
199	(New Zealand)	Jordan Kahu	Wing	2013	—N/a
201	(Australia)	Corey Oates	Wing	2013	—N/a
208	(Cook Islands)	Francis Molo	Prop	2014	—N/a
209	(Samoa)	Anthony Milford	Five-eighth	2015	(Australia) Canberra Raiders
210	(New Zealand)	Adam Blair	Prop	2015	(Australia) Wests Tigers
212	(Tonga)	Joe Ofahengaue	Prop	2015	—N/a
213	(New Zealand)	Kodi Nikorima	Hooker	2015	—N/a
215	(Australia)	Joe Boyce	Lock	2015	—N/a
218	(Australia)	James Roberts	Centre	2016	(Australia) Gold Coast Titans
219	(England)	Greg Eden	Wing	2016	(England) Castleford Tigers
220	(New Zealand)	Herman Ese'ese	Prop	2016	(Australia) Newcastle Knights
221	(Australia)	Travis Waddell	Hooker	2016	(Australia) Newcastle Knights
222	(Australia)	Jai Arrow	Lock	2016	—N/a
223	(Australia)	Jaydn Su'A	Second-row	2016	—N/a
224	(Tonga)	Tevita Pangai Junior	Prop	2016	—N/a
225	(Australia)	Tom Opacic	Centre	2016	—N/a
226	(Australia)	Jonus Pearson	Wing	2016	—N/a
–	(Australia)	Elijah Alick	Wing	Yet to debut	—N/a
–	(Australia)	Carlin Anderson	Fullback	Yet to debut	—N/a
–	(Australia)	Alex Barr	Second-row	Yet to debut	—N/a
–	(Australia)	Jayden Berrell	Hooker	Yet to debut	—N/a
–	(Australia)	Salesi Funaki	Second-row	Yet to debut	—N/a
–	(New Zealand)	Jamayne Isaako	Fullback	Yet to debut	—N/a
–	(Australia)	Todd Murphy	Halfback	Yet to debut	—N/a
–	(Australia)	Darren Nicholls	Halfback	Yet to debut	—N/a
–	(Australia)	Aaron Rockley	Prop	Yet to debut	—N/a
–	(Australia)	Sam Scarlett	Halfback	Yet to debut	—N/a
–	(Samoa)	Marion Seve	Wing	Yet to debut	—N/a

== Squad changes ==
=== Transfers in ===
Date	Position	Player	From	Year/s	Ref.
18 June 2015	Fullback	Carlin Anderson	Ipswich Jets	1 Year	
9 November 2015	Second-row	Caleb Timu	Mormon Mission (South Pacific)	2 Years	
1 December 2015	Halfback	Sam Scarlett	Souths Logan Magpies	1 Year	
2 December 2015	Second-row	Salesi Funaki	Wests Tigers	2 Years	
25 January 2016	Centre	Marion Seve	Wests Tigers	1 Year	
7 February 2016	Fullback	Jamayne Isaako	Cronulla-Sutherland Sharks	2 Years	

=== Transfers out ===
Date	Position	Player	To	Year/s	Ref.
25 July 2015	Lock	Todd Lowrie	Newcastle Knights	1 Year	
22 July 2015	Halfback	Ashley Taylor	Gold Coast Titans	3 Years	
10 August 2015	Centre	Justin Hodges	Retirement	—N/a	
25 August 2015	Five-eighth	Jayden Nikorima	Sydney Roosters	3 Years	
25 August 2015	Hooker	Matt Parcell	Manly-Warringah Sea Eagles	3 Years	
26 August 2015	Second-row	David Stagg	Retirement	—N/a	
12 September 2015	Prop	Mitchell Dodds	Warrington Wolves	1 Year	
20 October 2015	Centre	Jordan Drew	Cronulla-Sutherland Sharks	2 Years	
10 November 2015	Wing	Daniel Vidot	Salford RLFC	2 Years	
14 April 2016	Second-row	Caleb Timu	Queensland Reds	2 Years	

== Ladder ==
2016 NRL season
Pos	Team	Pld	W	D	L	B	PF	PA	PD	Pts
1	Melbourne Storm	24	19	0	5	2	563	302	+261	42
2	Canberra Raiders	24	17	1	6	2	688	456	+232	39
3	Cronulla-Sutherland Sharks (P)	24	17	1	6	2	580	404	+176	39
4	North Queensland Cowboys	24	15	0	9	2	584	355	+229	34
5	Brisbane Broncos	24	15	0	9	2	554	434	+120	34
6	Penrith Panthers	24	14	0	10	2	563	463	+100	32
7	Canterbury-Bankstown Bulldogs	24	14	0	10	2	506	448	+58	32
8	Gold Coast Titans	24	11	1	12	2	508	497	+11	27
9	Wests Tigers	24	11	0	13	2	499	607	−108	26
10	New Zealand Warriors	24	10	0	14	2	513	601	−88	24
11	St. George Illawarra Dragons	24	10	0	14	2	341	538	−197	24
12	South Sydney Rabbitohs	24	9	0	15	2	473	549	−76	22
13	Manly-Warringah Sea Eagles	24	8	0	16	2	454	563	−109	20
14	Parramatta Eels	24	13	0	11	2	298	324	−26	18^{1}
15	Sydney Roosters	24	6	0	18	2	443	576	−133	16
16	Newcastle Knights	24	1	1	22	2	305	800	−495	7

^{1} Parramatta were deducted 12 competition points and their for/against tally accumulated between rounds 1-9 for gross long-term salary cap breaches.

== Fixtures ==
=== Pre-season ===
Date	Opponent	Venue	Score	Tries	Goals
Saturday, 6 February	North Queensland Cowboys	Salter Oval	48-26	Eden (2), Whitchurch (2), Seve, Kahu, Roberts, Nikorima, Milford	Parker (3), Kahu (3)
Legend: Win Loss Draw

==== NRL Auckland Nines ====
The NRL Auckland Nines is a pre-season rugby league nines competition featuring all 16 NRL clubs. The 2016 competition wias played over two days on 6 and 7 February at Eden Park. The Broncos featured in the Hunua pool and played the Warriors, Bulldogs and Sea Eagles.

Hunua Pool
Team	Pld	W	D	L	PF	PA	PD	Pts
New Zealand Warriors	3	2	0	1	61	31	+30	4
Manly Warringah Sea Eagles	3	2	0	1	34	34	0	4
Canterbury-Bankstown Bulldogs	3	2	0	1	37	55	−18	4
Brisbane Broncos	3	0	0	3	29	41	−12	0

Date	Time (Local)	Round	Opponent	Venue	Score	Tries	Goals
Saturday, 6 February	2:45pm	Round 1	Manly Warringah Sea Eagles	Eden Park	8-11	Opacic (2)	Thaiday (0/1), Isaako (0/1)
Saturday, 6 February	6:40pm	Round 2	Canterbury-Bankstown Bulldogs	Eden Park	13-15	Arrow, McCullough	Timu (2/2)
Sunday, 7 February	12:40pm	Round 3	New Zealand Warriors	Eden Park	8-15	Isaako, Murphy	Isaako (0/2)
Legend: Win Loss Draw

==== World Club Series ====
Date	Opponent	Venue	Score	Tries	Goals	Attendance
Saturday, 21 February	Wigan Warriors	DW Stadium	42-12	Oates (2), Nikorima (2), Gillett, Wallace, Eden	Parker (6/6), Kahu (1/1)	19,103
Legend: Win Loss Draw

=== Regular season ===
Date	Round	Opponent	Venue	Score	Tries	Goals	Attendance
Thursday, 3 March	Round 1	Parramatta Eels	Pirtek Stadium	4 – 17	Kahu (2), Oates	Parker (1/4), Milford (1/1, 1/1 FG)	17,324
Friday, 11 March	Round 2	New Zealand Warriors	Suncorp Stadium	25 – 10	Oates, Reed, Boyd, Gillett	Parker (2/3), Milford (1/1, 1/1 FG), Kahu (1/2)	35,230
Saturday, 19 March	Round 3	Penrith Panthers	Pepper Stadium	23 – 22	Milford (2), Boyd, Hunt	Parker (2/3), Kahu (1/1)	12,086
Friday, 25 March	Round 4	North Queensland Cowboys	Suncorp Stadium	21 – 20 (Golden Point)	Milford, Roberts	Parker (6/6), Milford (1/1 FG)	46,176
Friday, 1 April	Round 5	Gold Coast Titans	Cbus Super Stadium	16 – 24	Roberts, Hunt, Kahu, Nikorima	Kahu (3/3), Parker (1/2)	21,080
Thursday, 7 April	Round 6	St. George Illawarra Dragons	Suncorp Stadium	26 – 0	Oates, Glenn, Milford, Kahu	Parker (5/6), Milford (0/1 FG)	29,869
Saturday, 16 April	Round 7	Newcastle Knights	Suncorp Stadium	53 – 0	Oates (3), Milford (3), Kahu (2), Hunt, Ofahengaue	Parker (3/6), Kahu (3/5), Milford (1/1) FG)	30,394
Friday, 22 April	Round 8	South Sydney Rabbitohs	Suncorp Stadium	30 – 8	Nikorima, Hunt, Oates, Kahu, Parker	Parker (3/4), Kahu (2/2)	40,275
Sunday, 1 May	Round 9	Cronulla-Sutherland Sharks	Southern Cross Group Stadium	30 – 28	Kahu, Oates, Roberts, Thaiday, Parker		14,406
Saturday, 14 May	Round 10	Manly-Warringah Sea Eagles	Suncorp Stadium	30 – 6	Boyd, Milford (2), Thaiday, Oates	Kahu (5/6)	52,347
Friday, 20 May	Round 11	North Queensland Cowboys	1300SMILES Stadium	19 – 18	Gillett (2), Kahu	Kahu (3/5)	25,163
Friday, 27 May	Round 12	Wests Tigers	Suncorp Stadium	18 – 19	Eden, Roberts, Maranta	Kahu (3/4)	27,153
Saturday, 4 June	Round 13	New Zealand Warriors	Mt Smart Stadium	36 – 18	Glen, Kahu, Tevita Pangai Junior	Parker (2/2), Kahu (1/1)	15,097
Thursday, 9 June	Round 14	Canberra Raiders	Suncorp Stadium	26 – 18	Parker, Boyd (3)	Parker (5/5)	25,021
	Round 15	Bye					
Saturday, 25 June	Round 16	Canterbury-Bankstown Bulldogs	ANZ Stadium	40 – 14	Oates, Roberts, Milford	Parker (1/4)	15,106
Friday, 1 July	Round 17	Melbourne Storm	Suncorp Stadium	6 – 48	Roberts	Parker (1/1)	44,519
	Round 18	Bye					
Saturday, 16 July	Round 19	South Sydney Rabbitohs	ANZ Stadium	10 – 30	Maranta, Hunt, Oates (2), Roberts	Kahu (3/3), Milford (2/2)	13,111
Friday, 22 July	Round 20	Penrith Panthers	Suncorp Stadium	12 – 31	Boyd, Roberts	Parker (2/2)	30,878
Thursday, 28 July	Round 21	Sydney Roosters	Allianz Stadium	32 – 16	Wallace, Opacic, Boyd	Parker (2/3)	6,308
Thursday, 4 August	Round 22	St George Illawarra	WIN Stadium	8 – 12	Thaiday, Maranta	Parker (2/3)	5,662
Friday, 12 August	Round 23	Parramatta Eels	Suncorp Stadium	38 – 16	Pearson (2), Oates (3), Milford, Hunt, Tevita Pangai Junior	Parker (2/7), Milford (1/1)	30,189
Thursday, 18 August	Round 24	Canterbury-Bankstown Bulldogs	Suncorp Stadium	20 – 10	Opacic, Hunt, Thaiday	Kahu (4/5)	27,746
Friday, 26 August	Round 25	Melbourne Storm	AAMI Park	16 – 26	Opacic (2), Kahu, Boyd, Arrow	Kahu (1/3), Parker (2/2)	20,263
Thursday, 1 September	Round 26	Sydney Roosters	Suncorp Stadium	24 – 14	Kahu (2), Roberts, Milford	Milford (3/3), Parker (1/2)	37,566
Legend: Win Loss Draw Bye

=== Finals ===
Qualifying and elimination finals
10 Sept, Melbourne Rectangular Stadium
1	Melbourne	16
4	North Queensland	10
9 Sept, Lang Park
5	Brisbane	44
8	Gold Coast	28
11 Sept, Sydney Football Stadium
6	Penrith	28
7	Canterbury	12
10 Sept, Canberra Stadium
2	Canberra	14
3	Cronulla	16

Semi-finals
16 Sept, Willows Sports Complex
North Queensland	26
Brisbane	20
17 Sept, Canberra Stadium
Canberra	22
Penrith	12

Preliminary finals
24 Sept, Melbourne Rectangular Stadium
Melbourne	14
Canberra	12
23 Sept, Sydney Football Stadium
Cronulla	32
North Queensland	20

Grand final
2 Oct, Stadium Australia
Melbourne	12
Cronulla	14

Date	Round	Opponent	Venue	Score	Tries	Goals	Attendance
Friday, 9 September	Elimination Final	Gold Coast Titans	Suncorp Stadium	44 – 28	Kahu (2), Glenn (2), Oates (2), Wallace, Milford	Kahu (6/7), Parker (0/1)	43,170
Friday, 16 September	Semi-Final	North Queensland Cowboys	1300SMILES Stadium	20 – 26 (Extra Time)	McCullough, Kahu, Oates	Kahu (4/4)	23,904
Legend: Win Loss Draw

== Statistics ==
Name	App	T	G	FG	Pts
Adam Blair	22	0	0	0	0
Alex Glenn	21	2	0	0	8
Andrew McCullough	19	0	0	0	0
Anthony Milford	24	13	8	4	72
Totals		86	0	0	0

== Representative honours ==
This table lists all players who played a representative match in 2016.

Player	All Stars	Anzac Test	Polynesian Cup	State Of Origin 1	State Of Origin 2	State Of Origin 3	Four Nations
Adam Blair	–	New Zealand	–	–	–	–	New Zealand
Darius Boyd	–	Australia	–	Queensland	Queensland	Queensland	Australia
Matt Gillett	–	Australia	–	Queensland	Queensland	Queensland	Australia
Jordan Kahu	World All Stars	New Zealand	–	–	–	–	New Zealand
Josh McGuire	–	Australia	–	Queensland	Queensland	Queensland	–
Kodi Nikorima	–	New Zealand	–	–	–	–	–
Corey Oates	–	–	–	Queensland	Queensland	Queensland	–
Joe Ofahengaue	–	–	Tonga	–	–	–	–
Corey Parker	–	Australia	–	Queensland	Queensland	Queensland	–
James Roberts	Indigenous All Stars	–	–	–	–	–	–
Sam Thaiday	Indigenous All Stars	Australia	–	Queensland	Queensland	Queensland	Australia

== Awards ==
=== League ===
- Peter Frilingos Memorial Award for Headline Moment of the Year: Anthony Milford
- Dally M Second-Rower of the Year: Matt Gillett

=== Broncos Awards Night ===
Held at Brisbane Convention & Exhibition Centre on Friday, 7 October 2016.

- Paul Morgan Medal (Player of the Year): Darius Boyd
- Players' Player: Anthony Milford
- Fans' Player of the Year: Anthony Milford
- Best Back (Allan Langer Award): Darius Boyd
- Best Forward (Shane Webcke Award): Sam Thaiday
- Most Consistent (Kevin Walters Award): Matt Gillett
- Rookie of the Year (Cyril Connell Award): Tom Opacic
- Play of the Year: Darius Boyd, Anthony Milford, Corey Parker, Andrew McCullough, James Roberts, Ben Hunt, Josh McGuire, Sam Thaiday and Tom Opacic – Round 24 vs Bulldogs, Tom Opacic try, 12th minute
- Clubman of the Year: Lachlan Maranta
- NYC Player of the Year: Patrick Carrigan
- NYC Players' Player: Kalolo Saituau
- NYC Best Back: Gehamat Shibasaki
- NYC Best Forward: Patrick Carrigan
- Broncos Club Life Memberships: Sam Thaiday, Paul Dyer
