= 2016 Canberra Raiders season =

- NRL Rank: 2nd
- Play-off result: Preliminary Finals
- 2016 record: Wins: 17; draws: 1; losses: 6
- Points scored: For: 688; against: 456

Team information
- CEO: Don Furner Jr.
- Coach: Ricky Stuart
- Captain: Jarrod Croker
- Stadium: GIO Stadium - 25,011
- Avg. attendance: 12,182 (regular season); 13,806 (including finals)
- High attendance: 18,825 vs. Eels on 21 August (regular season); 25,592 vs. Sharks on 10 September (including finals)

Top scorers
- Tries: Jordan Rapana (22)
- Goals: Jarrod Croker (112)
- Points: Jarrod Croker (296)
| ← 2015 | List of seasons | 2017 → |

The 2016 Canberra Raiders season is the 35th in the club's history. Coached by Ricky Stuart and captained by Jarrod Croker, the Raiders are currently competing in the NRL's 2016 Telstra Premiership. They also competed in the 2016 NRL Auckland Nines pre-season tournament.

== Squad ==
Canberra Raiders
| NRL Squad 2015 | | | Coaching staff |
|---|---|---|---|
| Blake Austin – FE, HB; Kurt Baptiste – HK; Mitchell Barnett – SR; Luke Bateman – LK; Shannon Boyd – PR; Adam Clydsdale – HK; Jarrod Croker (c) – CE; Lachlan Croker – FE, HB; Shaun Fensom – LK; Josh Hodgson – HK; Jarrad Kennedy – SR, CE | Brenko Lee – CE, WG; Edrick Lee – WG, CE; Joseph Leilua – CE, WG; Jeff Lima – PR; Frank-Paul Nu'uausala – PR, LK, SR; Kato Ottio – CE, WG; Tevita Pangai Junior – PR, SR; Josh Papalii – SR, LK; Junior Paulo – PR; Clay Priest – LK, PR; Jordan Rapana – WG, FB, CE | Zac Santo – FB, WG; Aidan Sezer – HB, FE; Iosia Soliola – SR, CE, LK; Joseph Tapine – SR; Paul Vaughan – PR, SR, LK; Sisa Waqa – WG, CE; Elliott Whitehead – SR; Jack Wighton – FB, CE, FE; Sam Williams – HB, FE | Head coach: Ricky Stuart; Assistant coaches: Dean Pay; Mick Crawley; Legend: (c) Captain(s); (vc) Vice-captain(s); Updated: 18 November 2015; Source(s): Raiders 2016 Squad |

=== Player transfers ===
A † denotes that the transfer occurred during the 2016 season.

Gains
| Player | Signed From | Until End of | Notes |
|---|---|---|---|
| Adam Clydsdale | Newcastle Knights | 2017 | |
| Jeff Lima | Catalans Dragons (Super League) | 2017 | |
| Kato Ottio | PNG Hunters (QLD Cup) | 2017 | |
| Junior Paulo† | Parramatta Eels | 2018 | |
| Zac Santo | North Queensland Cowboys | 2016 | |
| Aidan Sezer | Gold Coast Titans | 2018 | |
| Joseph Tapine† | Newcastle Knights | 2020 | |
| Elliott Whitehead | Catalans Dragons (Super League) | 2017 | |

Losses
| Player | Signed To | Until End of | Notes |
|---|---|---|---|
| Mitch Cornish | Parramatta Eels | 2016 | |
| Joel Edwards | Wests Tigers | 2017 | |
| Jeremy Hawkins | Melbourne Storm | 2017 | |
| Josh McCrone | St. George Illawarra Dragons | 2016 | |
| Mark Nicholls | Melbourne Storm | 2016 | |
| Frank-Paul Nu'uausala† | Wigan Warriors (Super League) | 2019 | |
| Kyle O'Donnell | Retirement | - | |
| Tevita Pangai Junior† | Brisbane Broncos | 2018 | |
| David Shillington | Gold Coast Titans | 2017 | |
| Sisa Waqa† | FC Grenoble (Top 14 - rugby union) | | |

== Fixtures ==
=== NRL Auckland Nines ===
The NRL Auckland Nines is a pre-season rugby league nines competition featuring all 16 NRL clubs. The 2016 competition was played over two days on 6 February and 7 February at Eden Park. The Raiders feature in the Piha pool and played the Dragons, Sharks and Titans.

=== Regular season ===
| Date | Round | Opponent | Venue | Score | Tries | Goals | Attendance |
|---|---|---|---|---|---|---|---|
| Saturday, 5 March | Round 1 | Penrith Panthers | GIO Stadium | 30 - 22 | Austin, Fensom, E Lee, Sezer (2) | J Croker (5/7) | 11,297 |
| Saturday, 12 March | Round 2 | Sydney Roosters | GIO Stadium | 21 - 20 | J Croker, Papalii (2), Soliola | J Croker (2/4), Williams (1 FG) | 12,423 |
| Saturday, 19 March | Round 3 | Newcastle Knights | Hunter Stadium | 24 - 24 | B Lee, Papalii, Rapana, Soliola | J Croker (4/6) | 13,745 |
| Saturday, 26 March | Round 4 | Gold Coast Titans | GIO Stadium | 20 - 24 | J Croker, E Lee, Whitehead | J Croker (4/4) | 11,039 |
| Monday, 4 April | Round 5 | Canterbury-Bankstown Bulldogs | Belmore Sports Ground | 8 - 22 | J Croker (2), Wighton | J Croker (5/5) | 13,463 |
| Saturday, 9 April | Round 6 | Parramatta Eels | Pirtek Stadium | 26 - 6 | Austin | J Croker (1/1) | 12,947 |
| Sunday, 17 April | Round 7 | Cronulla-Sutherland Sharks | GIO Stadium | 16 - 40 | Baptiste, Rapana, Sezer | J Croker (2/3) | 12,890 |
| Saturday, 23 April | Round 8 | Wests Tigers | GIO Stadium | 60 - 6 | Boyd, J Croker, Leilua (2), Rapana (4), Sezer, Vaughan, Whitehead | J Croker (8/11) | 13,420 |
| Saturday, 30 April | Round 9 | Penrith Panthers | Carrington Park | 19 - 18 | Rapana (2), Vaughan | J Croker (2/3) | 6,721 |
| Thursday, 12 May | Round 10 | St. George Illawarra Dragons | UOW Jubilee Oval | 16 - 12 | J Croker, Rapana | J Croker (2/2) | 9,647 |
| Saturday, 21 May | Round 11 | New Zealand Warriors | Yarrow Stadium | 12 - 38 | Austin, J Croker, Hodgson, E Lee, Leilua, Papalii | J Croker (7/8) | 12,833 |
| Sunday, 29 May | Round 12 | Canterbury-Bankstown Bulldogs | GIO Stadium | 32 - 12 | E Lee, Leilua, Rapana, Soliola, Tapine (2) | J Croker (4/6) | 13,907 |
| Friday, 3 June | Round 13 | Manly Warringah Sea Eagles | GIO Stadium | 30 - 18 | Hodgson, B Lee, Papalii, Whitehead, Wighton | J Croker (5/5) | 9,157 |
| Thursday, 9 June | Round 14 | Brisbane Broncos | Suncorp Stadium | 26 - 18 | Austin, Baptiste (2) | J Croker (3/3) | 25,021 |
| | Round 15 | Bye | | | | | |
| Sunday, 26 June | Round 16 | Gold Coast Titans | Cbus Super Stadium | 22 - 30 | J Croker (2), B Lee (2), Vaughan | J Croker (5/7) | 12,645 |
| Sunday, 3 July | Round 17 | Newcastle Knights | GIO Stadium | 29 - 25 | Austin, J Croker (2), Rapana, Wighton | J Croker (3/3), Sezer (1/1), Austin (1 FG) | 9,731 |
| Monday, 11 June | Round 18 | North Queensland Cowboys | GIO Stadium | 26 - 12 | Hodgson, Sezer, Wighton (2) | J Croker (5/6) | 8,328 |
| | Round 19 | Bye | | | | | |
| Saturday, 23 July | Round 20 | New Zealand Warriors | GIO Stadium | 26 - 22 | J Croker (3), Leilua, Tapine | J Croker (3/4) | 9,471 |
| Sunday, 31 July | Round 21 | South Sydney Rabbitohs | ANZ Stadium | 4 - 54 | Austin, J Croker, Hodgson, E Lee, Leilua, Rapana (2), Soliola, Whitehead (2), Wighton | J Croker (7/10) | 10,076 |
| Saturday, 6 August | Round 22 | Cronulla-Sutherland Sharks | Southern Cross Group Stadium | 14 - 30 | Austin, Rapana (2), Wighton | J Croker (7/7) | 15,133 |
| Monday, 15 August | Round 23 | Melbourne Storm | GIO Stadium | 22 - 8 | Boyd, Leilua (2) | J Croker (5/5) | 15,707 |
| Sunday, 21 August | Round 24 | Parramatta Eels | GIO Stadium | 28 - 18 | J Croker, B Lee (4), Soliola | J Croker (2/6) | 18,825 |
| Saturday, 27 August | Round 25 | Manly Warringah Sea Eagles | Brookvale Oval | 30 - 44 | E Lee, Leilua (2), Rapana (3), Vaughan, Wighton | J Croker (6/8) | 11,137 |
| Sunday, 4 September | Round 26 | Wests Tigers | Leichhardt Oval | 10 - 52 | J Croker, Hodgson, Leilua, Papalii (2), Rapana (2), Tapine, Williams | J Croker (6/6), Sezer (2/3) | 18,634 |
Legend: Win Loss Draw Bye

=== Finals ===
Qualifying and elimination finals
10 Sept, Melbourne Rectangular Stadium
1 | Melbourne | 16
4 | North Queensland | 10
9 Sept, Lang Park
5 | Brisbane | 44
8 | Gold Coast | 28
11 Sept, Sydney Football Stadium
6 | Penrith | 28
7 | Canterbury | 12
10 Sept, Canberra Stadium
2 | Canberra | 14
3 | Cronulla | 16

Semi-finals
16 Sept, Willows Sports Complex
North Queensland | 26
Brisbane | 20
17 Sept, Canberra Stadium
Canberra | 22
Penrith | 12

Preliminary finals
24 Sept, Melbourne Rectangular Stadium
Melbourne | 14
Canberra | 12
23 Sept, Sydney Football Stadium
Cronulla | 32
North Queensland | 20

Grand final
2 Oct, Stadium Australia
Melbourne | 12
Cronulla | 14

| Date | Round | Opponent | Venue | Score | Tries | Goals | Attendance |
|---|---|---|---|---|---|---|---|
| Saturday, 10 September | Qualifying Final | Cronulla-Sutherland Sharks | GIO Stadium | 14 - 16 | Hodgson, Rapana | J Croker (3/3) | 25,592 |
| Saturday, 17 September | Semi Final | Penrith Panthers | GIO Stadium | 22 - 12 | Austin, J Croker, Rapana | J Croker (5/5) | 21,498 |
| Saturday, 24 September | Preliminary Final | Melbourne Storm | AAMI Park | 12 - 14 | Rapana, Whitehead | Sezer (2/2) | 28,161 |
Legend: Win Loss Draw Bye

== Ladder ==
2016 NRL season
| Pos | Team | Pld | W | D | L | B | PF | PA | PD | Pts |
|---|---|---|---|---|---|---|---|---|---|---|
| 1 | Melbourne Storm | 24 | 19 | 0 | 5 | 2 | 563 | 302 | +261 | 42 |
| 2 | Canberra Raiders | 24 | 17 | 1 | 6 | 2 | 688 | 456 | +232 | 39 |
| 3 | Cronulla-Sutherland Sharks (P) | 24 | 17 | 1 | 6 | 2 | 580 | 404 | +176 | 39 |
| 4 | North Queensland Cowboys | 24 | 15 | 0 | 9 | 2 | 584 | 355 | +229 | 34 |
| 5 | Brisbane Broncos | 24 | 15 | 0 | 9 | 2 | 554 | 434 | +120 | 34 |
| 6 | Penrith Panthers | 24 | 14 | 0 | 10 | 2 | 563 | 463 | +100 | 32 |
| 7 | Canterbury-Bankstown Bulldogs | 24 | 14 | 0 | 10 | 2 | 506 | 448 | +58 | 32 |
| 8 | Gold Coast Titans | 24 | 11 | 1 | 12 | 2 | 508 | 497 | +11 | 27 |
| 9 | Wests Tigers | 24 | 11 | 0 | 13 | 2 | 499 | 607 | −108 | 26 |
| 10 | New Zealand Warriors | 24 | 10 | 0 | 14 | 2 | 513 | 601 | −88 | 24 |
| 11 | St. George Illawarra Dragons | 24 | 10 | 0 | 14 | 2 | 341 | 538 | −197 | 24 |
| 12 | South Sydney Rabbitohs | 24 | 9 | 0 | 15 | 2 | 473 | 549 | −76 | 22 |
| 13 | Manly-Warringah Sea Eagles | 24 | 8 | 0 | 16 | 2 | 454 | 563 | −109 | 20 |
| 14 | Parramatta Eels | 24 | 13 | 0 | 11 | 2 | 298 | 324 | −26 | 18^{1} |
| 15 | Sydney Roosters | 24 | 6 | 0 | 18 | 2 | 443 | 576 | −133 | 16 |
| 16 | Newcastle Knights | 24 | 1 | 1 | 22 | 2 | 305 | 800 | −495 | 7 |

^{1} Parramatta were deducted 12 competition points and their for/against tally accumulated between rounds 1-9 for gross long-term salary cap breaches.

== Player statistics ==
=== Highest try scorers ===
| No. | Player | Games | Tries |
|---|---|---|---|
| 1 | Jordan Rapana | 26 | 21 |
| 2 | Jarrod Croker | 26 | 17 |
| 3 | Joseph Leilua | 24 | 10 |
| =4 | Jack Wighton | 25 | 8 |
| =4 | Blake Austin | 19 | 8 |

=== Most goals ===
| No. | Player | Games | Goals |
|---|---|---|---|
| 1 | Jarrod Croker | 26 | 112 |
| 2 | Aidan Sezer | 23 | 3 |

=== Most field goals ===
| No. | Player | Games | Field goals |
|---|---|---|---|
| =1 | Blake Austin | 18 | 1 |
| =1 | Sam Williams | 9 | 1 |

=== Highest point scorers ===
| No. | Player | Games | Tries | Goals | Field goals | Points |
|---|---|---|---|---|---|---|
| 1 | Jarrod Croker | 26 | 18 | 112 | 0 | 296 |
| 2 | Jordan Rapana | 26 | 22 | 0 | 0 | 88 |
| 3 | Joseph Leilua | 24 | 10 | 0 | 0 | 40 |
| 4 | Blake Austin | 18 | 8 | 0 | 1 | 33 |
| 5 | Jack Wighton | 25 | 8 | 0 | 0 | 32 |

== Representative ==
=== Domestic ===
| Pos. | Player | Team | Call-up |
|---|---|---|---|
| WG | Edrick Lee | Indigenous All Stars | 2016 All Stars Match |
| BE | Jack Wighton | Indigenous All Stars | 2016 All Stars Match |
| CE | Jarrod Croker | World All Stars | 2016 All Stars Match |
| FE | Aidan Sezer | NSW City | 2016 City vs Country Origin |
| PR | Shannon Boyd | NSW Country | 2016 City vs Country Origin |
| CE | Jarrod Croker | NSW Country | 2016 City vs Country Origin |
| BE | Paul Vaughan | NSW Country | 2016 City vs Country Origin |
| FB | Jack Wighton | NSW Country | 2016 City vs Country Origin |
| BE | Josh Papalii | Queensland | 2016 State of Origin |

=== International ===
| Pos. | Player | Team | Call-up |
|---|---|---|---|
| SR | Josh Papalii | Australia | 2016 Anzac Test |
| CE | Sisa Waqa | Fiji | 2016 Melanesian Cup |
| BE | Kurt Baptiste | Papua New Guinea | 2016 Melanesian Cup |
| CE | Kato Ottio | Papua New Guinea | 2016 Melanesian Cup |

== Honours ==
The Raiders' club awards were announced during their awards night on 19 September.

- Mal Meninga Medal: Josh Hodgson and Josh Papalii
- NRL Coaches Award: Joseph Leilua and Jordan Rapana
- NRL Rookie of the Year: Clay Priest
- Fred Daly Clubman of the Year: Iosia Soliola
- NYC Player of the Year: Jack Williams
- NYC Coaches Award: Daniel Dole
- Gordon McLucas Junior Representative Player of the Year: Nick Cotric
- Geoff Caldwell Welfare and Education Award: Jack Hickson
