= 2016 Sydney Roosters season =

- NRL Rank: 15th
- 2016 record: Wins: 6; draws: 0; losses: 18
- Points scored: For: 443; against: 576

Team information
- CEO: John Lee
- Coach: Trent Robinson
- Captain: Jake Friend
- Stadium: Allianz Stadium
← 2015	List of seasons	2017 →

The 2016 Sydney Roosters season is the 109th in the club's history. They competed in the 2016 National Rugby League season. In 2016, Trent Robinson coached the Sydney Roosters. Jake Friend captained the team in 2016 alongside two vice-captains in Boyd Cordner and Jared Waerea-Hargreaves.

== Squad ==
Cap	Nat.	Player	Pos.	Sydney Roosters Debut	Previous club
1022	(Scotland)	Ian Henderson	HK	14 March 2003	Catalans Dragons
1033	(Tonga)	Lopini Paea	PR	9 August 2003	Wakefield Trinity Wildcats
1067	(Australia)	Mitchell Aubusson	SR	19 March 2007
1069	(New Zealand)	Shaun Kenny-Dowall	CE	19 March 2007
1072	(Australia)	Mitchell Pearce (C)	HB	24 March 2007
1083	(Australia)	Jake Friend (C)	HK	27 June 2008
1101	(Australia)	Aidan Guerra	SR	14 March 2010
1105	(New Zealand)	Jared Waerea-Hargreaves (VC)	PR	17 April 2010	Manly Warringah Sea Eagles
1119	(Australia)	Boyd Cordner (VC)	SR	4 June 2011
1130	(Australia)	Daniel Tupou	WG	18 August 2012
1131	(Australia)	Michael Jennings	CE	7 March 2013	Penrith Panthers
1133	(New Zealand)	Sam Moa	PR	7 March 2013	Hull F.C.
1137	(Samoa)	Isaac Liu	LK	1 April 2013
1138	(Cook Islands)	Dylan Napa	PR	21 June 2013
1139	(Australia)	Samisoni Langi	FE	19 August 2013
1140	(Fiji)	Kane Evans	PR	15 March 2014
1144	(Australia)	Brendan Elliot	WG	5 July 2014
1145	(Australia)	Jackson Hastings	HB	4 September 2014
1146	(Australia)	Blake Ferguson	WG	7 March 2015	Canberra Raiders
1147	(New Zealand)	Matt McIlwrick	HK	7 March 2015	Canberra Raiders
1148	(New Zealand)	Sio Siua Taukeiaho	LK	7 March 2015	New Zealand Warriors
1149	(Tonga)	Willie Manu	SR	5 April 2015	St. Helens
–	(Tonga)	Paki Afu	SR	Yet to Debut
–	(England)	Joe Burgess	WG	Yet to Debut	Wigan Warriors
–	(Australia)	Tyler Cornish	HB	Yet to Debut
–	(Australia)	Mitchell Frei	SR	Yet to Debut
–	(Australia)	Vincent Leuluai	SR	Yet to Debut
–	(New Zealand)	Joseph Manu	FB	Yet to Debut
–	(Australia)	Ryan Matterson	FE	Yet to Debut
–	(Australia)	Latrell Mitchell	FB	Yet to Debut
–	(Australia)	Shaquai Mitchell	PR	Yet to Debut
–	(Australia)	Jayden Nikorima	HB	Yet to Debut
–	(New Zealand)	Abraham Papalii	SR	Yet to Debut
–	(Australia)	Jack Siejka	SR	Yet to Debut
–	(New Zealand)	Omar Slaimankhel	WG	Yet to Debut	New Zealand Warriors

=== Squad movements ===
Gains
Player	Signed From
Joe Burgess	Wigan Warriors
Ryan Matterson	Parramatta Eels
Jayden Nikorima	Brisbane Broncos

Losses
Player	Signed With
James Maloney	Cronulla-Sutherland Sharks
Roger Tuivasa-Sheck	New Zealand Warriors
Michael Jennings	Parramatta Eels

== Results ==
=== Pre-season ===
19 February 2016
Game 1

Sydney Roosters	38-12	St Helens R.F.C.
Try: Guerra 2 Evans Copley Kenny Dowall Ferguson Tupou all got 1 Con: Hastings 5		Try: Peyroux 2 Con: Walsh 2

Langtree Park

=== Regular season ===
Round 1	v

Round 2	v

Round 3	v

Round 4	v

Round 5	v

Round 6	v

Round 7	v

Round 8	v

Round 9	v

Round 10	v

Round 11	v

Round 12	v

Round 13	v

Round 14	v

Round 15	v

Round 16	v

Round 17	v

Round 18	v

Round 19	v

Round 20	v

Round 21	v

Round 22	v

Round 23	v

Round 24	v

Round 25	v

Round 26	v

== Ladder ==
2016 NRL season
Pos	Team	Pld	W	D	L	B	PF	PA	PD	Pts
1	Melbourne Storm	24	19	0	5	2	563	302	+261	42
2	Canberra Raiders	24	17	1	6	2	688	456	+232	39
3	Cronulla-Sutherland Sharks (P)	24	17	1	6	2	580	404	+176	39
4	North Queensland Cowboys	24	15	0	9	2	584	355	+229	34
5	Brisbane Broncos	24	15	0	9	2	554	434	+120	34
6	Penrith Panthers	24	14	0	10	2	563	463	+100	32
7	Canterbury-Bankstown Bulldogs	24	14	0	10	2	506	448	+58	32
8	Gold Coast Titans	24	11	1	12	2	508	497	+11	27
9	Wests Tigers	24	11	0	13	2	499	607	−108	26
10	New Zealand Warriors	24	10	0	14	2	513	601	−88	24
11	St. George Illawarra Dragons	24	10	0	14	2	341	538	−197	24
12	South Sydney Rabbitohs	24	9	0	15	2	473	549	−76	22
13	Manly-Warringah Sea Eagles	24	8	0	16	2	454	563	−109	20
14	Parramatta Eels	24	13	0	11	2	298	324	−26	18^{1}
15	Sydney Roosters	24	6	0	18	2	443	576	−133	16
16	Newcastle Knights	24	1	1	22	2	305	800	−495	7

^{1} Parramatta were deducted 12 competition points and their for/against tally accumulated between rounds 1-9 for gross long-term salary cap breaches.

== Player statistics ==
Player	Appearances	Tries	Goals	Field Goals	Total Points
–	–	–	–	–	–

== Representative honours ==
Player	All Stars	ANZAC Test	Pacific Tests	City / Country	State of Origin 1	State of Origin 2	State of Origin 3	Four Nations
