= Rory O'Brien =

Australian rugby league footballer

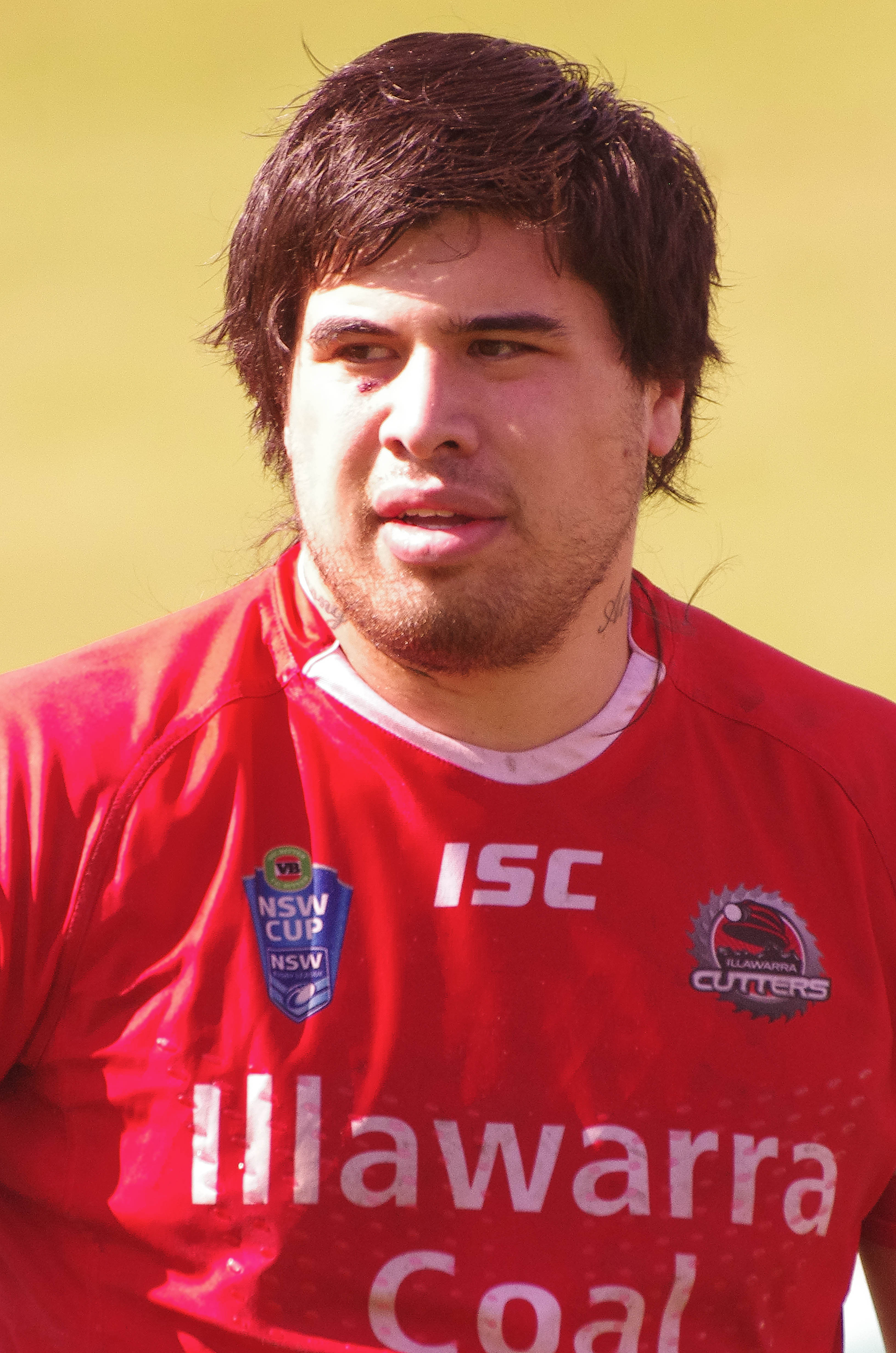
- O'Brien playing for the Illawarra Cutters in 2014.

Personal information
- Born: 2 June 1989 (age 37) Sydney, New South Wales, Australia
- Height: 195 cm (6 ft 5 in)
- Weight: 126 kg (19 st 12 lb)

Playing information
- Position: Prop
Club
Years	Team	Pld	T	G	FG	P
2015	St. George Illawarra	3	0	0	0	0
2016–17	Parramatta Eels	11	0	0	0	0
	Total	14	0	0	0	0
- Source: As of 4 March 2018

Rory O'Brien (born 2 June 1989) is an Australian former professional rugby league footballer who played in the 2000s and 2010s. He most recently played for the Parramatta Eels in the National Rugby League, as a prop. He previously played for the St. George Illawarra Dragons.

== Background ==
Born in Sydney, New South Wales, O'Brien is of Māori and Irish descent and played his junior football for Hurstville United, before being signed by the St. George Illawarra Dragons.

== Playing career ==
=== Early career ===
In 2008, O'Brien played for the St. George Illawarra Dragons' NYC team, before giving up the game in early 2009. In 2013, he took up rugby league again, playing with the Collegians in the Illawarra Rugby League and winning the 2013 Country Rugby League Player of the Year award along with former Newcastle Knights, Sydney Roosters and Gold Coast Titans player Riley Brown. In October 2013, he played for the New South Wales Country Residents team that toured South Africa. In 2014, he joined the Illawarra Cutters in the New South Wales Cup. On 26 June 2014, he signed a 2 1/2-year contract to return to the St. George Illawarra Dragons effective immediately.

=== 2015 ===
In round 1 of the 2015 NRL season, O'Brien made his NRL debut for St. George against the Melbourne Storm. On 26 August, he signed a 1-year contract with the Parramatta Eels starting in 2016, after being released from the final year of his Saints contract.

=== 2016 ===
In round 14 of the 2016 season, O'Brien made his debut for Parramatta against the Gold Coast Titans. In August, he re-signed with Parramatta on a contract until the end of the 2017 season.

=== 2017 ===
O'Brien played two games for Parramatta in the 2017 season. In the opening round against Manly and then the following week against St George. O'Brien spent the rest of the season playing for the Wentworthville Magpies in the Intrust Super Premiership NSW. On 29 November 2017, it was revealed that O'Brien's contract with Parramatta was not renewed and he was released by the club.
