= 2016 Wests Tigers season =

The 2016 Wests Tigers season saw the club compete in the National Rugby League's 2016 Telstra Premiership. They also competed in the 2016 NRL Auckland Nines tournament.

== 2016 results ==
Round	Home team		Away team
1	Wests Tigers	34–26	New Zealand Warriors
2	Wests Tigers	36–22	Manly-Warringah Sea Eagles
3	Gold Coast Titans	30–18	Wests Tigers
4	Wests Tigers	0–8	Parramatta Eels
5	Wests Tigers	26–34	Cronulla Sharks
6	Newcastle Knights	18–16	Wests Tigers
7	Wests Tigers	18–19	Melbourne Storm
8	Canberra Raiders	60–6	Wests Tigers
9	South Sydney Rabbitohs	22–30	Wests Tigers
10	Wests Tigers	4–36	Canterbury-Bankstown Bulldogs
11	Wests Tigers	20–12	Newcastle Knights
12	Brisbane Broncos	18–19	Wests Tigers
13	Sydney Roosters	32–18	Wests Tigers
14	Wests Tigers	30–14	South Sydney Rabbitohs
15	Wests Tigers	vs	Bye
16	Melbourne Storm	29–20	Wests Tigers
17	Wests Tigers	34–26	Penrith Panthers
18	Canterbury-Bankstown Bulldogs	32–22	Wests Tigers
19	Wests Tigers	vs	Bye
20	St George Illawarra Dragons	12–25	Wests Tigers
21	Parramatta Eels	8–23	Wests Tigers
22	Wests Tigers	26–14	North Queensland Cowboys
23	Wests Tigers	18–19	Gold Coast Titans
24	Penrith Panthers	40–10	Wests Tigers
25	New Zealand Warriors	24–36	Wests Tigers
26	Wests Tigers	10–52	Canberra Raiders

== Ladder ==
2016 NRL season
Pos	Team	Pld	W	D	L	B	PF	PA	PD	Pts
1	Melbourne Storm	24	19	0	5	2	563	302	+261	42
2	Canberra Raiders	24	17	1	6	2	688	456	+232	39
3	Cronulla-Sutherland Sharks (P)	24	17	1	6	2	580	404	+176	39
4	North Queensland Cowboys	24	15	0	9	2	584	355	+229	34
5	Brisbane Broncos	24	15	0	9	2	554	434	+120	34
6	Penrith Panthers	24	14	0	10	2	563	463	+100	32
7	Canterbury-Bankstown Bulldogs	24	14	0	10	2	506	448	+58	32
8	Gold Coast Titans	24	11	1	12	2	508	497	+11	27
9	Wests Tigers	24	11	0	13	2	499	607	−108	26
10	New Zealand Warriors	24	10	0	14	2	513	601	−88	24
11	St. George Illawarra Dragons	24	10	0	14	2	341	538	−197	24
12	South Sydney Rabbitohs	24	9	0	15	2	473	549	−76	22
13	Manly-Warringah Sea Eagles	24	8	0	16	2	454	563	−109	20
14	Parramatta Eels	24	13	0	11	2	298	324	−26	18^{1}
15	Sydney Roosters	24	6	0	18	2	443	576	−133	16
16	Newcastle Knights	24	1	1	22	2	305	800	−495	7

^{1} Parramatta were deducted 12 competition points and their for/against tally accumulated between rounds 1-9 for gross long-term salary cap breaches.
