= 2016 St. George Illawarra Dragons season =

- 2016 record: Wins: 10; draws: 0; losses: 14

Team information
- Captain: Ben Creagh Gareth Widdop
- Stadium: WIN Jubilee Oval WIN Stadium
| ← 2015 | 2017 → |

The 2016 St. George Illawarra Dragons season is the 18th in the joint venture club's history. The Dragons will compete in the NRL's 2016 Telstra Premiership season.

Ben Creagh and Gareth Widdop were named co-captains of the team in January.

== Gains And Losses of Squad 2016 ==
=== Players ===
| ▲ or ▼ | Player | 2015 Club | 2016 Club |
|---|---|---|---|
| ▲ | Mose Masoe | Super League: St. Helens | St. George Illawarra Dragons |
| ▲ | Tyrone McCarthy | Super League: Hull Kingston Rovers | St. George Illawarra Dragons |
| ▲ | Kurt Mann | Melbourne Storm | St. George Illawarra Dragons |
| ▲ | Dunamis Lui | Manly-Warringah Sea Eagles | St. George Illawarra Dragons |
| ▲ | Kalifa Faifai Loa | Gold Coast Titans | St. George Illawarra Dragons |
| ▲ | Tim Lafai | Canterbury-Bankstown Bulldogs | St. George Illawarra Dragons |
| ▼ | George Rose | St. George Illawarra Dragons | Retirement |
| ▼ | Dylan Farrell | St. George Illawarra Dragons | Retirement |
| ▼ | Dan Hunt | St. George Illawarra Dragons | Retirement |
| ▼ | Heath L'Estrange | St. George Illawarra Dragons | Retirement |
| ▼ | Peter Mata'utia | St. George Illawarra Dragons | Newcastle Knights |
| ▼ | Trent Merrin | St. George Illawarra Dragons | Penrith Panthers |

== Ladder ==
2016 NRL season
| Pos | Team | Pld | W | D | L | B | PF | PA | PD | Pts |
|---|---|---|---|---|---|---|---|---|---|---|
| 1 | Melbourne Storm | 24 | 19 | 0 | 5 | 2 | 563 | 302 | +261 | 42 |
| 2 | Canberra Raiders | 24 | 17 | 1 | 6 | 2 | 688 | 456 | +232 | 39 |
| 3 | Cronulla-Sutherland Sharks (P) | 24 | 17 | 1 | 6 | 2 | 580 | 404 | +176 | 39 |
| 4 | North Queensland Cowboys | 24 | 15 | 0 | 9 | 2 | 584 | 355 | +229 | 34 |
| 5 | Brisbane Broncos | 24 | 15 | 0 | 9 | 2 | 554 | 434 | +120 | 34 |
| 6 | Penrith Panthers | 24 | 14 | 0 | 10 | 2 | 563 | 463 | +100 | 32 |
| 7 | Canterbury-Bankstown Bulldogs | 24 | 14 | 0 | 10 | 2 | 506 | 448 | +58 | 32 |
| 8 | Gold Coast Titans | 24 | 11 | 1 | 12 | 2 | 508 | 497 | +11 | 27 |
| 9 | Wests Tigers | 24 | 11 | 0 | 13 | 2 | 499 | 607 | −108 | 26 |
| 10 | New Zealand Warriors | 24 | 10 | 0 | 14 | 2 | 513 | 601 | −88 | 24 |
| 11 | St. George Illawarra Dragons | 24 | 10 | 0 | 14 | 2 | 341 | 538 | −197 | 24 |
| 12 | South Sydney Rabbitohs | 24 | 9 | 0 | 15 | 2 | 473 | 549 | −76 | 22 |
| 13 | Manly-Warringah Sea Eagles | 24 | 8 | 0 | 16 | 2 | 454 | 563 | −109 | 20 |
| 14 | Parramatta Eels | 24 | 13 | 0 | 11 | 2 | 298 | 324 | −26 | 18^{1} |
| 15 | Sydney Roosters | 24 | 6 | 0 | 18 | 2 | 443 | 576 | −133 | 16 |
| 16 | Newcastle Knights | 24 | 1 | 1 | 22 | 2 | 305 | 800 | −495 | 7 |

^{1} Parramatta were deducted 12 competition points and their for/against tally accumulated between rounds 1-9 for gross long-term salary cap breaches.
