= 2016 NRL season =

109th season of professional rugby league in Australia

2016 National Rugby League
- Duration: March 3 – October 2, 2016
- Teams: 16
- Premiers: Cronulla-Sutherland Sharks (1st title)
- Minor premiers: Melbourne Storm (2nd title)
- Matches played: 201
- Points scored: 8388
- Average attendance: 16,063
- Total attendance: 3,228,623
- Top points scorer: Jarrod Croker (296)
- Wooden spoon: Newcastle Knights (3rd spoon)
- Dally M Medal: Cooper Cronk & Jason Taumalolo
- Top try-scorer: Suliasi Vunivalu (22)

The 2016 NRL season was the 109th season of professional rugby league in Australia and the 19th season run by the National Rugby League. The season started in New Zealand with the annual Auckland Nines, and was followed by the All Stars Match, which was played at Suncorp Stadium in Brisbane, and the World Club Series. The season concluded on October 2 with the Cronulla-Sutherland Sharks winning their first ever premiership after 50 seasons, having entered the competition in 1967. The season was also noteworthy as it was the first time that all three Queensland based teams made the finals.

== Teams ==
The lineup of teams remained unchanged for the 10th consecutive year. The NRL's salary cap for the clubs' top 25 players was $A6.3M for 2016.

Colours	Club	Season	Home ground(s)	Head coach	Captain(s)
	Brisbane Broncos	29th season	Suncorp Stadium	Wayne Bennett	Corey Parker
	Canberra Raiders	35th season	GIO Stadium Canberra	Ricky Stuart	Jarrod Croker
	Canterbury-Bankstown Bulldogs	82nd season	ANZ Stadium & Belmore Sports Ground	Des Hasler	James Graham
	Cronulla-Sutherland Sharks	50th season	Southern Cross Group Stadium	Shane Flanagan	Paul Gallen
	Gold Coast Titans	10th season	Cbus Super Stadium	Neil Henry	Nathan Friend & William Zillman
	Manly Warringah Sea Eagles	67th season	Brookvale Oval	Trent Barrett	Jamie Lyon
	Melbourne Storm	19th season	AAMI Park	Craig Bellamy	Cameron Smith
	Newcastle Knights	29th season	Hunter Stadium	Nathan Brown	Jeremy Smith, Trent Hodkinson & Tariq Sims
	New Zealand Warriors	22nd season	Mt. Smart Stadium	Andrew McFadden	Ryan Hoffman
	North Queensland Cowboys	22nd season	1300SMILES Stadium	Paul Green	Johnathan Thurston & Matt Scott
	Parramatta Eels	70th season	Pirtek Stadium & ANZ Stadium	Brad Arthur	Tim Mannah & Kieran Foran
	Penrith Panthers	50th season	Pepper Stadium	Anthony Griffin	Matt Moylan
	South Sydney Rabbitohs	107th season	ANZ Stadium	Michael Maguire	Greg Inglis
	St. George Illawarra Dragons	18th season	UOW Jubilee Oval & WIN Stadium	Paul McGregor	Ben Creagh & Gareth Widdop
	Sydney Roosters	109th season	Allianz Stadium	Trent Robinson	Jake Friend
	Wests Tigers	16th season	Campbelltown Stadium & Leichhardt Oval & ANZ Stadium	Jason Taylor	Aaron Woods

== Pre-season ==
The 2016 pre-season featured the third edition of the Auckland Nines competition, held over a weekend at Auckland's Eden Park in which the Parramatta Eels defeated the New Zealand Warriors in the final. The All Stars match was held on February 13 at Suncorp Stadium in Brisbane. The 2016 World Club Series took place in England with the NRL premiers North Queensland Cowboys defeating the Super League champions Leeds Rhinos in the World Club Challenge match.

== Parramatta Eels salary cap breach ==
The Parramatta Eels were faced with starting the season on -4 points due to salary cap indiscretions in 2015, however the NRL was satisfied with governance changes at the Eels and no points were deducted.

However, on 3 May 2016, after further salary cap breaches were exposed by the NRL, CEO Todd Greenberg announced the preliminary penalties of the club being fined $1 million, deducted twelve competition points, stripped of its 2016 Auckland Nines title and they were barred from receiving any further competition points until they fell under the salary cap, which they were reported to have exceeded by $570,000. Five officials (chairman Steve Sharp, deputy chairman Tom Issa, director Peter Serrao, chief executive John Boulous and football manager Daniel Anderson) were also suspended indefinitely. On 12 May the NRL reported that Parramatta had fallen back under the salary cap for 2016 and were able to play for competition points again for their next scheduled game.

On 9 July, after over 2 months of club officials contesting the preliminary penalties, Parramatta were handed their punishment with the addition of their for/against points tally accumulated from rounds 1-9 being deducted.

== Regular season ==
Team	1	2	3	4	5	6	7	8	9	10	11	12	13	14	15	16	17	18	19	20	21	22	23	24	25	26	F1	F2	F3	GF
Brisbane Broncos	**PAR**; **13**	NZL; 15	**PEN**; **1**	NQL; 1*	**GCT**; **8**	SGI; 26	NEW; 53	SOU; 22	**CRO**; **2**	MAN; 24	**NQL**; **1**	WTI; 1	**NZL**; **18**	CAN; 8	X	**CBY**; **26**	MEL; 42	X	**SOU**; **20**	PEN; 19	**SYD**; **16**	**SGI**; **4**	PAR; 22	CBY; 10	**MEL**; **10**	SYD; 10	GCT; 16	**NQL**; **6***		
Canberra Raiders	PEN; 8	SYD; 1	**NEW**; **0***	GCT; 4	**CBY**; **14**	**PAR**; **30**	CRO; 24	WTI; 54	**PEN**; **1**	**SGI**; **4***	**NZL**; **26**	CBY; 12	MAN; 12	**BRI**; **8**	X	**GCT**; **8**	NEW; 4*	NQL; 14	X	NZL; 4*	**SOU**; **50**	**CRO**; **16**	MEL; 14	PAR; 10	**MAN**; **14**	**WTI**; **42**	CRO; 2	PEN; 10	**MEL**; **2**	
Canterbury-Bankstown Bulldogs	**MAN**; **22**	**PEN**; **2**	PAR; 14	**SOU**; **30**	CAN; 14	**MEL**; **6**	**NZL**; **4**	GCT; 1*	PAR; 8	WTI; 32	SYD; 12	**CAN**; **12**	CRO; 2	SGI; 18	X	BRI; 26	**SYD**; **4**	WTI; 10	X	**NQL**; **36**	SGI; 3	**NEW**; **14**	MAN; 4*	**BRI**; **10**	NQL; 8	SOU; 18	**PEN**; **16**			
Cronulla-Sutherland Sharks	**NQL**; **6**	SGI; 28	**MAN**; **10**	MEL; 8	**WTI**; **8**	GCT; 5	**CAN**; **24**	PEN; 2	BRI; 2	**NEW**; **62**	MAN; 8	X	**CBY**; **2**	NQL; 3	X	NZL; 1*	PAR; 10	**PEN**; **16**	**SYD**; **12**	NEW; 32	**GCT**; **0***	CAN; 16	**SGI**; **14**	**SOU**; **6**	SYD; 25	**MEL**; **20**	**CAN**; **2**	X	NQL; 12	MEL; 2
Gold Coast Titans	NEW; 18	**MEL**; **18**	WTI; 12	**CAN**; **4**	BRI; 8	**CRO**; **5**	SGI; 5	**CBY**; **1***	MEL; 38	SYD; 20	**PEN**; **4**	X	**SOU**; **1***	PAR; 10	MAN; 20	CAN; 8	**NZL**; **9**	X	**SGI**; **20**	PAR; 20	CRO; 0*	NZL; 10	**WTI**; **1**	**NEW**; **20**	PEN; 1	**NQL**; **16**	**BRI**; **16**			
Manly Warringah Sea Eagles	CBY; 22	**WTI**; **14**	CRO; 10	**SYD**; **2**	SOU; 4	**NZL**; **16**	PAR; 12	**NEW**; **16**	NQL; 16	**BRI**; **24**	**CRO**; **8**	X	**CAN**; **12**	PEN; 7	**GCT**; **20**	**NQL**; **4**	SGI; 30	X	NZL; 1*	**SOU**; **8**	NEW; 20	**PAR**; **1**	**CBY**; **4***	MEL; 20	CAN; 14	**PEN**; **30**				
Melbourne Storm	SGI; 2	GCT; 18	**NZL**; **7**	**CRO**; **8**	NEW; 4	CBY; 6	**WTI**; **1***	NZL; 42	**GCT**; **38**	**NQL**; **1**	**PAR**; **12**	X	PEN; 18	**SYD**; **46**	**SGI**; **10**	WTI; 9	**BRI**; **42**	X	**NEW**; **4**	SYD; 16	**NQL**; **8**	SOU; 1*	**CAN**; **14**	**MAN**; **20**	BRI; 10	CRO; 20	NQL; 6	X	CAN; 2	**CRO**; **2**
Newcastle Knights	**GCT**; **18**	**SOU**; **42**	CAN; 0*	**NZL**; **22**	**MEL**; **4**	WTI; 2	**BRI**; **53**	MAN; 16	**SYD**; **38**	CRO; 62	**WTI**; **8**	PAR; 2	**NQL**; **30**	NZL; 36	X	SGI; 12	**CAN**; **4***	X	MEL; 4	**CRO**; **32**	**MAN**; **20**	CBY; 14	PEN; 36	GCT; 20	SOU; 22	**SGI**; **2**				
New Zealand Warriors	**WTI**; **8**	**BRI**; **15**	MEL; 7	NEW; 22	**SYD**; **4***	MAN; 16	CBY; 4	**MEL**; **42**	SGI; 16	PEN; 12	CAN; 26	X	BRI; 18	**NEW**; **36**	SYD; 2	**CRO**; **1***	GCT; 9	X	**MAN**; **1***	**CAN**; **4***	PEN; 4*	**GCT**; **10**	SOU; 19	**NQL**; **28**	WTI; 12	PAR; 22				
North Queensland Cowboys	CRO; 6	**PAR**; **4**	SYD; 40	**BRI**; **1***	SGI; 36	**PEN**; **5**	SOU; 26	PAR; 16	**MAN**; **16**	MEL; 1	BRI; 1	**SGI**; **4**	NEW; 30	**CRO**; **3**	X	MAN; 4	SOU; 20	**CAN**; **14**	X	CBY; 36	MEL; 8	**WTI**; **12**	**SYD**; **12**	NZL; 28	**CBY**; **8**	GCT; 16	**MEL**; **6**	BRI; 6*	**CRO**; **12**	
Parramatta Eels	BRI; 13	NQL; 4	**CBY**; **14**	**WTI**; **8**	PEN; 2	CAN; 30	**MAN**; **12**	**NQL**; **16**	**CBY**; **8**	SOU; 2	MEL; 12	**NEW**; **2**	X	**GCT**; **10**	**SOU**; **18**	X	**CRO**; **10**	SYD; 4	**PEN**; **4**	**GCT**; **20**	**WTI**; **15**	MAN; 1	**BRI**; **22**	**CAN**; **10**	SGI; 12	**NZL**; **22**				
Penrith Panthers	**CAN**; **8**	CBY; 2	BRI; 1	**SGI**; **2**	**PAR**; **2**	NQL; 5	**SYD**; **4**	**CRO**; **2**	CAN; 1	**NZL**; **12**	GCT; 4	X	**MEL**; **18**	**MAN**; **7**	X	SOU; 2	**WTI**; **8**	CRO; 16	PAR; 4	**BRI**; **19**	**NZL**; **4***	SYD; 20	**NEW**; **36**	WTI; 30	**GCT**; **1**	MAN; 30	CBY; 16	**CAN**; **10**		
South Sydney Rabbitohs	**SYD**; **32**	NEW; 42	**SGI**; **2**	CBY; 30	**MAN**; **4**	SYD; 7	**NQL**; **26**	**BRI**; **22**	WTI; 8	**PAR**; **2**	SGI; 10	X	GCT; 1*	WTI; 16	PAR; 18	**PEN**; **2**	**NQL**; **20**	X	BRI; 20	MAN; 8	CAN; 50	**MEL**; **1***	**NZL**; **19**	CRO; 6	**NEW**; **22**	CBY; 18				
St. George Illawarra Dragons	**MEL**; **2**	**CRO**; **28**	SOU; 2	PEN; 2	**NQL**; **36**	**BRI**; **26**	**GCT**; **5**	**SYD**; **2**	**NZL**; **16**	CAN; 4*	**SOU**; **10**	NQL; 4	X	**CBY**; **18**	MEL; 10	**NEW**; **12**	**MAN**; **30**	X	GCT; 20	**WTI**; **13**	**CBY**; **3**	BRI; 4	CRO; 14	**SYD**; **36**	**PAR**; **12**	NEW; 2				
Sydney Roosters	SOU; 32	**CAN**; **1**	**NQL**; **40**	MAN; 2	NZL; 4*	**SOU**; **7**	PEN; 4	SGI; 2	NEW; 38	**GCT**; **20**	**CBY**; **12**	X	WTI; 14	MEL; 46	**NZL**; **2**	X	CBY; 4	**PAR**; **4**	CRO; 12	**MEL**; **16**	BRI; 16	**PEN**; **20**	NQL; 12	SGI; 36	**CRO**; **25**	**BRI**; **10**				
Wests Tigers	NZL; 8	MAN; 14	**GCT**; **12**	PAR; 8	CRO; 8	**NEW**; **2**	MEL; 1*	**CAN**; **54**	**SOU**; **8**	**CBY**; **32**	NEW; 8	**BRI**; **1**	**SYD**; **14**	**SOU**; **16**	X	**MEL**; **9**	PEN; 8	**CBY**; **10**	X	SGI; 13	PAR; 15	NQL; 12	GCT; 1	**PEN**; **30**	**NZL**; **12**	CAN; 42				
Team	1	2	3	4	5	6	7	8	9	10	11	12	13	14	15	16	17	18	19	20	21	22	23	24	25	26	F1	F2	F3	GF

Bold – Opposition's Home game
X – Bye
* – Golden point game
Opponent for round listed above margin

== Ladder ==
2016 NRL season
Pos	Team	Pld	W	D	L	B	PF	PA	PD	Pts
1	Melbourne Storm	24	19	0	5	2	563	302	+261	42
2	Canberra Raiders	24	17	1	6	2	688	456	+232	39
3	Cronulla-Sutherland Sharks (P)	24	17	1	6	2	580	404	+176	39
4	North Queensland Cowboys	24	15	0	9	2	584	355	+229	34
5	Brisbane Broncos	24	15	0	9	2	554	434	+120	34
6	Penrith Panthers	24	14	0	10	2	563	463	+100	32
7	Canterbury-Bankstown Bulldogs	24	14	0	10	2	506	448	+58	32
8	Gold Coast Titans	24	11	1	12	2	508	497	+11	27
9	Wests Tigers	24	11	0	13	2	499	607	−108	26
10	New Zealand Warriors	24	10	0	14	2	513	601	−88	24
11	St. George Illawarra Dragons	24	10	0	14	2	341	538	−197	24
12	South Sydney Rabbitohs	24	9	0	15	2	473	549	−76	22
13	Manly-Warringah Sea Eagles	24	8	0	16	2	454	563	−109	20
14	Parramatta Eels	24	13	0	11	2	298	324	−26	18^{1}
15	Sydney Roosters	24	6	0	18	2	443	576	−133	16
16	Newcastle Knights	24	1	1	22	2	305	800	−495	7

^{1} Parramatta were deducted 12 competition points and their for/against tally accumulated between rounds 1-9 for gross long-term salary cap breaches.

=== Ladder progression ===
- Numbers highlighted in green indicate that the team finished the round inside the top 8.
- Numbers highlighted in blue indicates the team finished first on the ladder in that round.
- Numbers highlighted in red indicates the team finished last place on the ladder in that round.
- Underlined numbers indicate that the team had a bye during that round.

	Team	1	2	3	4	5	6	7	8	9	10	11	12	13	14	15	16	17	18	19	20	21	22	23	24	25	26
1	Melbourne	2	4	6	6	8	8	10	12	14	16	18	20	22	24	24	26	28	30	32	34	36	38	38	40	40	42
2	Canberra	2	4	5	5	7	7	7	9	9	9	11	13	15	15	17	19	21	23	25	27	29	31	33	35	37	39
3	Cronulla-Sutherland (P)	0	2	2	4	6	8	10	12	14	16	18	20	22	24	26	28	30	32	34	36	37	37	37	37	39	39
4	North Queensland	2	2	4	4	6	8	10	12	14	14	16	16	18	18	20	22	24	24	26	28	28	28	28	30	32	34
5	Brisbane	2	4	4	6	8	10	12	14	14	16	16	16	16	18	20	20	20	22	24	24	24	26	28	30	32	34
6	Penrith	0	0	2	2	4	4	6	6	8	10	10	12	12	14	16	18	18	18	20	22	22	24	26	28	30	32
7	Canterbury-Bankstown	2	4	4	6	6	8	8	10	10	12	14	14	14	16	18	20	22	24	26	26	28	30	32	32	32	32
8	Gold Coast	2	2	4	6	6	6	6	6	6	8	10	12	14	14	16	16	16	18	20	22	23	23	25	27	27	27
9	Wests	2	4	4	4	4	4	4	4	6	6	8	10	10	12	14	14	16	16	18	20	22	24	24	24	26	26
10	New Zealand	0	0	0	2	4	4	6	6	8	8	8	10	12	14	16	16	18	20	20	20	22	24	24	24	24	24
11	St. George Illawarra	0	0	2	4	4	4	6	8	8	10	10	12	14	14	16	18	18	20	20	20	20	20	22	22	22	24
12	South Sydney	2	4	4	4	6	6	6	6	6	8	10	12	12	12	12	12	12	14	14	14	14	14	16	18	20	22
13	Manly-Warringah	0	0	2	4	4	6	6	8	8	8	8	10	10	10	10	10	12	14	16	18	20	20	20	20	20	20
14	Parramatta*	0	2	4	6	6	8	10	10	12	0	0	2	4	6	8	10	10	12	12	12	12	14	14	14	16	18
15	Sydney	0	0	0	0	0	2	2	2	4	4	4	6	8	8	8	10	10	10	10	10	12	12	14	16	16	16
16	Newcastle	0	0	1	1	1	3	3	3	3	3	3	3	3	3	5	5	5	7	7	7	7	7	7	7	7	7

== Finals series ==
A new format of extra time was introduced for the finals series where two additional 5-minute periods are played and if the scores are still tied afterwards, the next team to score wins.

The 2016 Finals series is notable as the first time three Queensland teams have all made the finals in one season.

Canberra also broke a long preliminary final drought reaching their first grand final qualifier in 19 years.

Home	Score	Away	Match Information
Home	Score	Away	Date and Time (Local)	Venue	Referees	Crowd
QUALIFYING & ELIMINATION FINALS
Brisbane Broncos	44 – 28	Gold Coast Titans	9 September 2016, 8:00 pm	Suncorp Stadium	Gerard Sutton; Gavin Badger	43,170
Canberra Raiders	14 – 16	Cronulla-Sutherland Sharks	10 September 2016, 5:45 pm	GIO Stadium Canberra	Matt Cecchin; Alan Shortall	25,592
Melbourne Storm	16 – 10	North Queensland Cowboys	10 September 2016, 8:00 pm	AAMI Park	Ben Cummins; Grant Atkins	21,233
Penrith Panthers	28 – 12	Canterbury-Bankstown Bulldogs	11 September 2016, 4:15 pm	Allianz Stadium	Jared Maxwell; Chris James	22,631
SEMI FINALS
North Queensland Cowboys †	26 – 20	Brisbane Broncos	16 September 2016, 8:05 pm	1300SMILES Stadium	Matt Cecchin; Alan Shortall	23,804
Canberra Raiders	22 – 12	Penrith Panthers	17 September 2016, 7:50 pm	GIO Stadium Canberra	Ben Cummins; Gerard Sutton	21,498
PRELIMINARY FINALS
Cronulla-Sutherland Sharks	32 – 20	North Queensland Cowboys	23 September 2016, 8:05 pm	Allianz Stadium	Ben Cummins; Gerard Sutton	36,717
Melbourne Storm	14 – 12	Canberra Raiders	24 September 2016, 7:55 pm	AAMI Park	Matt Cecchin; Alan Shortall	28,161

† Match decided in extra time.

=== Chart ===
Qualifying and elimination finals
10 Sept, AAMI Park
1	Melbourne	16
4	North Queensland	10
9 Sept, Suncorp Stadium
5	Brisbane	44
8	Gold Coast	28
11 Sept, Allianz Stadium
6	Penrith	28
7	Canterbury-Bankstown	12
10 Sept, GIO Stadium Canberra
2	Canberra	14
3	Cronulla-Sutherland	16

Semi-finals
16 Sept, 1300SMILES Stadium
North Queensland	26
Brisbane	20
17 Sept, GIO Stadium Canberra
Canberra	22
Penrith	12

Preliminary finals
24 Sept, AAMI Park
Melbourne	14
Canberra	12
23 Sept, Allianz Stadium
Cronulla-Sutherland	32
North Queensland	20

Grand final
2 Oct, ANZ Stadium
Melbourne	12
Cronulla-Sutherland	14

== Grand final ==
Sunday, 2 October
7:35pm AEDT

Melbourne Storm	12 – 14	Cronulla-Sutherland Sharks
Tries: Jesse Bromwich (50') 1 Will Chambers (64') 1 Goals: Cameron Smith 2/2 (51', 65')	1st: 0 - 8; 2nd: 12 - 6	Tries: Ben Barba (15') 1 Andrew Fifita (69') 1 Goals: James Maloney 3/3 (8' pen, 16', 71')

ANZ Stadium
Attendance: 83,625
Clive Churchill Medalist: Luke Lewis
Referee: Matt Cecchin, Ben Cummins

== Regular season player statistics ==
The following statistics are at the conclusion of Round 26.

Top 5 point scorers

Points	Player	Tries	Goals	Field Goals
276	Jarrod Croker	17	104	0
185	Johnathan Thurston	2	88	1
185	James Maloney	5	81	3
176	Cameron Smith	2	83	2
162	Michael Gordon	5	71	0

Top 5 try scorers

Tries	Player
22	Suliasi Vunivalu
20	Jordan Rapana
19	Bevan French
19	Valentine Holmes
17	Jarrod Croker

Top 5 goal scorers

Goals	Player
104	Jarrod Croker
88	Johnathan Thurston
83	Cameron Smith
81	James Maloney
71	Michael Gordon

Top 5 tacklers

Tackles	Player
1,279	Jake Friend
1,042	Simon Mannering
1,022	Mitch Rein
960	Cameron Smith
941	Elliott Whitehead

== Transfers ==
=== Players ===
Player	2015 Club	2016 Club
Dale Copley	Brisbane Broncos	Sydney Roosters
Mitchell Dodds	Brisbane Broncos	Super League: Warrington Wolves
Justin Hodges	Brisbane Broncos	Retirement
David Stagg	Brisbane Broncos	Retirement
Daniel Vidot	Brisbane Broncos	Super League: Salford Red Devils
Joel Edwards	Canberra Raiders	Wests Tigers
Josh McCrone	Canberra Raiders	St. George Illawarra Dragons
Frank-Paul Nu'uausala	Canberra Raiders	Super League: Wigan Warriors
David Shillington	Canberra Raiders	Gold Coast Titans
Dane Tilse	Canberra Raiders	Super League: Hull Kingston Rovers
Sisa Waqa	Canberra Raiders	FC Grenoble (French rugby union)
Trent Hodkinson	Canterbury-Bankstown Bulldogs	Newcastle Knights
Antonio Kaufusi	Canterbury-Bankstown Bulldogs	Retirement
Tim Lafai	Canterbury-Bankstown Bulldogs	St. George Illawarra Dragons
Frank Pritchard	Canterbury-Bankstown Bulldogs	Super League: Hull F.C.
Corey Thompson	Canterbury-Bankstown Bulldogs	Super League: Widnes Vikings
Tinirau Arona	Cronulla-Sutherland Sharks	Super League: Wakefield Trinity Wildcats
Blake Ayshford	Cronulla-Sutherland Sharks	New Zealand Warriors
Michael Gordon	Cronulla-Sutherland Sharks	Parramatta Eels
Jeff Robson	Cronulla-Sutherland Sharks	New Zealand Warriors
Anthony Tupou	Cronulla-Sutherland Sharks	Super League: Wakefield Trinity Wildcats
Kalifa Faifai Loa	Gold Coast Titans	St. George Illawarra Dragons
Beau Falloon	Gold Coast Titans	Super League: Leeds Rhinos
Kevin Gordon	Gold Coast Titans	Retirement
Nate Myles	Gold Coast Titans	Manly Warringah Sea Eagles
Ben Ridge	Gold Coast Titans	Retirement
James Roberts	Gold Coast Titans	Brisbane Broncos
Aidan Sezer	Gold Coast Titans	Canberra Raiders
Dave Taylor	Gold Coast Titans	Super League: Catalans Dragons
Brad Tighe	Gold Coast Titans	Retirement
Matthew White	Gold Coast Titans	Melbourne Storm
Matt Ballin	Manly Warringah Sea Eagles	Wests Tigers
Cheyse Blair	Manly Warringah Sea Eagles	Melbourne Storm
Luke Burgess	Manly Warringah Sea Eagles	Super League: Salford Red Devils
Kieran Foran	Manly Warringah Sea Eagles	Parramatta Eels
James Hasson	Manly Warringah Sea Eagles	N/A
Peta Hiku	Manly Warringah Sea Eagles	Penrith Panthers
Justin Horo	Manly Warringah Sea Eagles	Super League: Catalans Dragons
Dunamis Lui	Manly Warringah Sea Eagles	St. George Illawarra Dragons
Willie Mason	Manly Warringah Sea Eagles	Super League: Catalans Dragons
Feleti Mateo	Manly Warringah Sea Eagles	Super League: Salford Red Devils
Jesse Sene-Lefao	Manly Warringah Sea Eagles	Cronulla-Sutherland Sharks
David Williams	Manly Warringah Sea Eagles	Retirement
Matt Duffie	Melbourne Storm	Auckland Blues (Super Rugby)
Mahe Fonua	Melbourne Storm	Super League: Hull F.C.
Ryan Hinchcliffe	Melbourne Storm	Super League: Huddersfield Giants
Tom Learoyd-Lahrs	Melbourne Storm	Retirement
Kurt Mann	Melbourne Storm	St. George Illawarra Dragons
Dayne Weston	Melbourne Storm	Leigh Centurions
Adam Clydsdale	Newcastle Knights	Canberra Raiders
David Fa'alogo	Newcastle Knights	Retirement
Kurt Gidley	Newcastle Knights	Super League: Warrington Wolves
Chris Houston	Newcastle Knights	Super League: Widnes Vikings
Joseph Leilua	Newcastle Knights	Canberra Raiders
James McManus	Newcastle Knights	Retirement
Clint Newton	Newcastle Knights	Retirement
Tyrone Roberts	Newcastle Knights	Gold Coast Titans
Beau Scott	Newcastle Knights	Parramatta Eels
Nathan Friend	New Zealand Warriors	Gold Coast Titans
Konrad Hurrell	New Zealand Warriors	Gold Coast Titans
Sebastine Ikahihifo	New Zealand Warriors	Super League: Huddersfield Giants
Dominique Peyroux	New Zealand Warriors	Super League: St. Helens
Sam Rapira	New Zealand Warriors	Super League: Huddersfield Giants
Sam Tomkins	New Zealand Warriors	Super League: Wigan Warriors
Chad Townsend	New Zealand Warriors	Cronulla-Sutherland Sharks
Glenn Hall	North Queensland Cowboys	Retirement
Robert Lui	North Queensland Cowboys	Super League: Salford Red Devils
Matthew Wright	North Queensland Cowboys	Manly Warringah Sea Eagles
Beau Champion	Parramatta Eels	Retirement
Richie Faʻaoso	Parramatta Eels	Retirement
Will Hopoate	Parramatta Eels	Canterbury-Bankstown Bulldogs
Darcy Lussick	Parramatta Eels	Manly Warringah Sea Eagles
Ryan Morgan	Parramatta Eels	Melbourne Storm
Pauli Pauli	Parramatta Eels	Newcastle Knights
Joseph Paulo	Parramatta Eels	Cronulla-Sutherland Sharks
Reece Robinson	Parramatta Eels	New South Wales Waratahs (Super Rugby)
Chris Sandow	Parramatta Eels	Super League: Warrington Wolves
Anthony Watmough	Parramatta Eels	Retirement
Lewis Brown	Penrith Panthers	Manly Warringah Sea Eagles
Jamal Idris	Penrith Panthers	Hiatus
Brent Kite	Penrith Panthers	Retirement
Apisai Koroisau	Penrith Panthers	Manly Warringah Sea Eagles
Sika Manu	Penrith Panthers	Super League: Hull F.C.
Nigel Plum	Penrith Panthers	Retirement
James Segeyaro	Penrith Panthers	Super League: Leeds Rhinos
David Simmons	Penrith Panthers	Retirement
Elijah Taylor	Penrith Panthers	Wests Tigers
Tim Grant	South Sydney Rabbitohs	Wests Tigers
Ben Lowe	South Sydney Rabbitohs	Retirement
Issac Luke	South Sydney Rabbitohs	New Zealand Warriors
Chris McQueen	South Sydney Rabbitohs	Gold Coast Titans
Daryl Millard	South Sydney Rabbitohs	Retirement
Joel Reddy	South Sydney Rabbitohs	Retirement
Glenn Stewart	South Sydney Rabbitohs	Super League: Catalans Dragons
Dylan Walker	South Sydney Rabbitohs	Manly Warringah Sea Eagles
Dylan Farrell	St. George Illawarra Dragons	Retirement
Mark Ioane	St. George Illawarra Dragons	London Broncos
Heath L'Estrange	St. George Illawarra Dragons	Retirement
Peter Mata'utia	St. George Illawarra Dragons	Newcastle Knights
Trent Merrin	St. George Illawarra Dragons	Penrith Panthers
George Rose	St. George Illawarra Dragons	Retirement
Michael Jennings	Sydney Roosters	Parramatta Eels
James Maloney	Sydney Roosters	Cronulla-Sutherland Sharks
Willie Manu	Sydney Roosters	Retirement
Suaia Matagi	Sydney Roosters	Penrith Panthers
Matt McIlwrick	Sydney Roosters	Cronulla-Sutherland Sharks
Roger Tuivasa-Sheck	Sydney Roosters	New Zealand Warriors
Jack Buchanan	Wests Tigers	Super League: Widnes Vikings
Josh Drinkwater	Wests Tigers	Leigh Centurions
Keith Galloway	Wests Tigers	Super League: Leeds Rhinos
Pat Richards	Wests Tigers	Super League: Catalans Dragons
Martin Taupau	Wests Tigers	Manly Warringah Sea Eagles
Ian Henderson	Super League: Catalans Dragons	Sydney Roosters
Jeff Lima	Super League: Catalans Dragons	Canberra Raiders
Michael Oldfield	Super League: Catalans Dragons	South Sydney Rabbitohs
Zeb Taia	Super League: Catalans Dragons	Gold Coast Titans
Elliott Whitehead	Super League: Catalans Dragons	Canberra Raiders
Mickey Paea	Super League: Hull F.C.	Newcastle Knights
Jordan Rankin	Super League: Hull F.C.	Wests Tigers
Tyrone McCarthy	Super League: Hull Kingston Rovers	St. George Illawarra Dragons
Adam Quinlan	Super League: St. Helens	St. George Illawarra Dragons
Pita Godinet	Super League: Wakefield Trinity Wildcats	Manly Warringah Sea Eagles
Joe Burgess	Super League: Wigan Warriors	Sydney Roosters
Dane Nielsen	Bradford Bulls	South Sydney Rabbitohs
Sam Burgess	Bath (English rugby union)	South Sydney Rabbitohs
Russell Packer	Imprisonment	St. George Illawarra Dragons

=== Coaches ===
Coach	2015 Club	2016 Club
Trent Barrett	Country	Manly-Warringah Sea Eagles
Mal Meninga	Queensland	Australia
Nathan Brown	N/A	Newcastle Knights
Anthony Griffin	N/A	Penrith Panthers
Kevin Walters	N/A	Queensland

== Attendances ==
Total and average home attendances:

Team	Games	Total	Average
Brisbane	12	404,306	33,692
Melbourne	12	216,944	18,079
North Queensland	12	200,582	16,715
Wests Tigers	12	184,674	15,390
Canterbury	12	182,419	15,202
Cronulla	12	174,941	14,578
Newcastle	12	173,484	14,457
Manly	12	173,171	14,431
Souths	12	171,973	14,331
New Zealand	12	171,620	14,302
Parramatta	12	167,144	13,929
Gold Coast Titans	12	165,671	13,806
St George Illawarra	12	163,588	13,632
Penrith	12	153,820	12,818
Canberra	12	146,195	12,183
Sydney Roosters	12	122,820	10,235
