= Wade Graham =

Australia international rugby league footballer

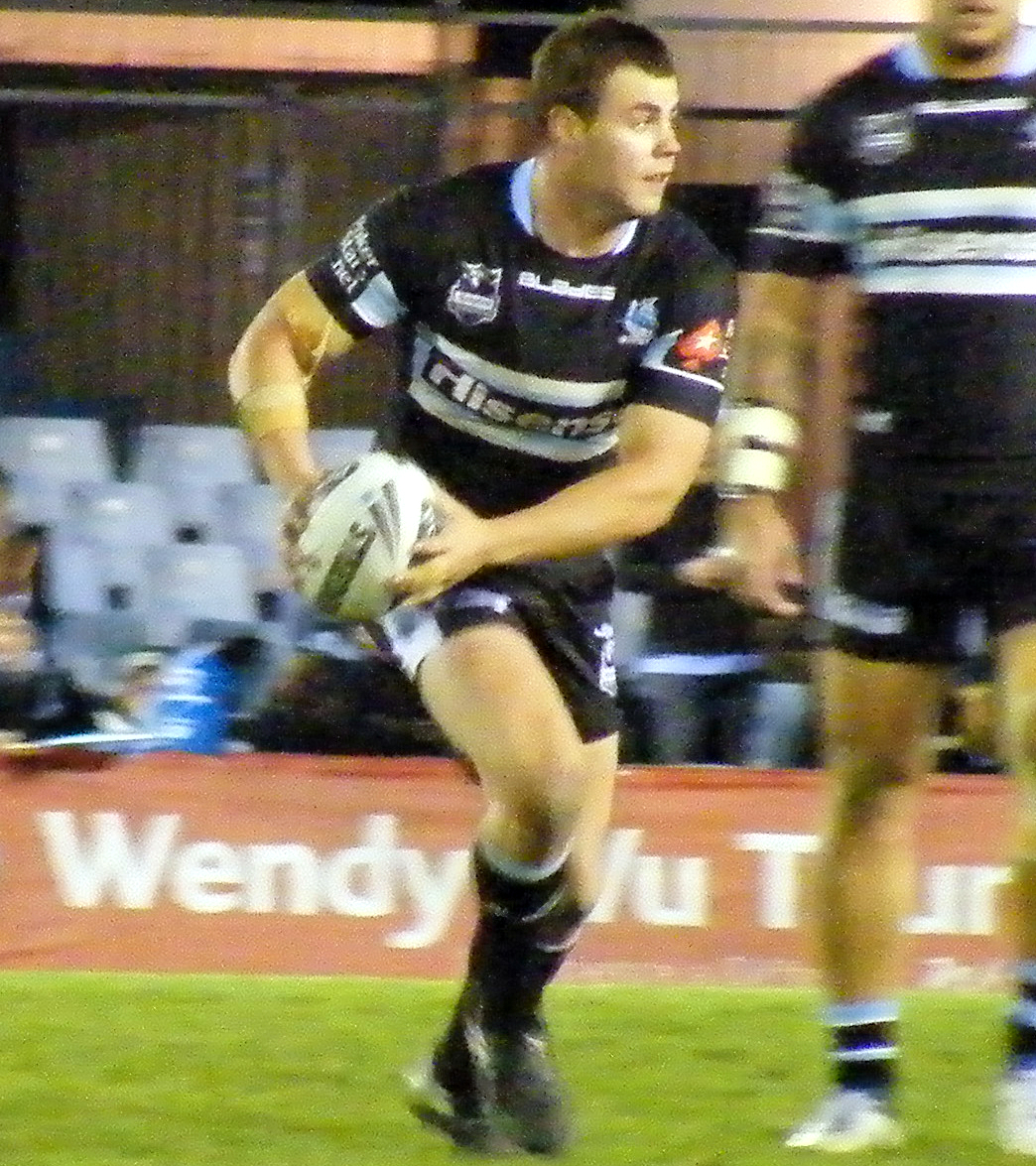

Personal information
- Born: 25 October 1990 (age 36) Blacktown, New South Wales, Australia

Playing information
- Height: 186 cm (6 ft 1 in)
- Weight: 106 kg (16 st 10 lb)
- Position: Second-row, Five-eighth
Club
Years	Team	Pld	T	G	FG	P
2008–10	Penrith Panthers	42	9	0	0	36
2011–23	Cronulla Sharks	255	41	0	2	166
	Total	297	50	0	2	202
Representative
Years	Team	Pld	T	G	FG	P
2012–19	Prime Minister's XIII	2	0	0	0	0
2013–15	NSW City Origin	2	0	0	0	0
2016–20	Indigenous All Stars	3	0	0	0	0
2016–19	New South Wales	6	0	0	0	0
2017–19	Australia	8	4	0	0	16
2019	Australia 9s	4	0	0	0	0

Wade Graham (born 25 October 1990) is an Australian former professional rugby league footballer who played as a second-row forward and captained the Cronulla-Sutherland Sharks in the National Rugby League (NRL). He has played for Australia at international level.

Graham previously played for the Penrith Panthers between 2008 and 2010 in the NRL, and has played at representative level for the Prime Minister's XIII, City Origin, Indigenous All Stars and New South Wales in the State of Origin series.

== Background ==
Graham was born in Blacktown, a suburb of Western Sydney and is of Indigenous Australian descent - from Bundjalung people.

== Playing career ==
Graham played his junior rugby league for Blacktown City and attended The Hills Sports High School before being signed by the Penrith Panthers. Graham played for New South Wales under 16's and 18's, as well as the Panthers Harold Matthews and SG Ball teams. Graham started the 2008 season in the NYC for the Penrith Panthers before being called up to the first-grade squad, still as a 17-year-old in high school.

=== 2008 ===
In round 15 of the 2008 NRL season, Graham was called up to make his NRL debut for the Penrith Panthers at five-eighth against the St George Illawarra Dragons in the 13–12 loss at ANZ Stadium. Graham finished his debut year in the NRL with him playing in 8 matches for the Penrith club in the 2008 NRL season.

=== 2009 ===
In round 4 against the Wests Tigers, Graham scored his first NRL career try in Penrith's 42–22 win at Penrith Stadium. Graham finished the 2009 NRL season with him playing in 22 matches and scoring five tries for the Penrith club.

=== 2010 ===
On 24 June 2010, Graham signed with Cronulla starting from 2011 with a desire to play regular first-grade football from the preference for the halves combinations of Travis Burns and Luke Walsh by the Penrith coach Matthew Elliot limited the number of games he could have played. Graham finished the 2010 NRL season with him playing in 12 matches and scoring 4 tries for Penrith.

=== 2011 ===
In round 1 of the 2011 NRL season, Graham made his club debut for the Cronulla-Sutherland Sharks against the Canberra Raiders at halfback in Cronulla's 40–12 loss at Canberra Stadium. In Round 4 against the New Zealand Warriors at Owen Delany Park in Taupō, New Zealand, Graham scored his first club try for Cronulla in the 26–18 loss. Graham finished the 2011 NRL season with him playing in all of Cronulla's 24 matches, scoring six tries and kicking two field goals.

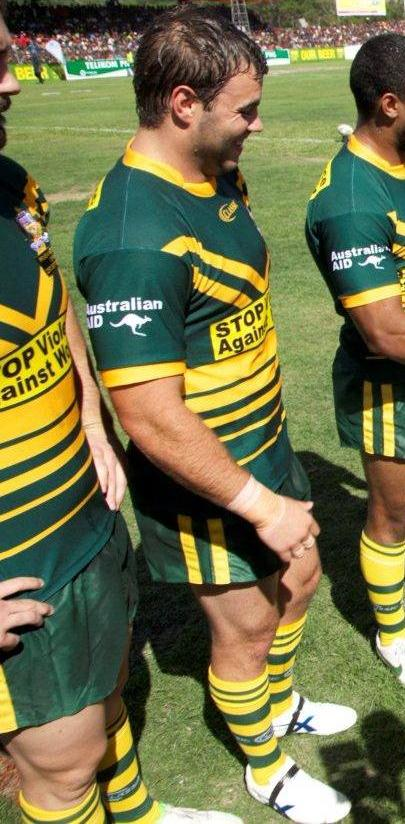
Graham lining up for the Prime Ministers XIII in 2012

=== 2012 ===
On 26 May 2012, Graham extended his contract with the Cronulla club for a further two seasons to the end of the 2014 season. Graham finished the 2012 NRL season having played in 15 matches and scoring six tries.

=== 2013 ===
On 29 April 2013, Graham was among the first of many Cronulla players to be interviewed by ASADA, where controversy ensued regarding his attending the interview in casual attire. Graham was selected for the NSW City team in the 2013 City vs Country Origin match off the interchange bench in City's 18–12 loss in Coffs Harbour. In Round 17 against the Wests Tigers, Graham played his 100th NRL career match, scoring a try in Cronulla's 36–22 win at Remondis Stadium. Graham finished the 2013 NRL season having played 23 matches and scoring two tries for Cronulla.

=== 2014 ===
In February 2014, Graham was selected in the Sharks inaugural 2014 Auckland Nines squad. On 14 April 2014, Graham extended his contract with Cronulla-Sutherland for another three years to the end of the 2017 season after knocking back a $500,000 a season offer from the South Sydney Rabbitohs. On 22 August 2014, Graham became one of the Cronulla players to accept reduced bans from the Australian Sports Anti-Doping Authority for his role in the 2011 Sharks supplements scandal. Graham finished off the 2014 NRL season having played 19 matches and scoring five tries.

=== 2015 ===
On 31 January and 1 February, Graham captained the Sharks in the 2015 NRL Auckland Nines, after originally selected captain, Luke Lewis, was ruled out with injury. On 3 May, Graham captained New South Wales City against New South Wales Country, playing at second-row in his team's 34–22 loss at Wagga Wagga. He co-captained the Sharks alongside Michael Ennis for a period whilst Cronulla's regular captain Paul Gallen was sidelined due to injury. Graham finished the 2015 season having played in all of the Sharks 26 matches, and scoring four tries. On 15 December, he was named on the interchange bench for the Indigenous All Stars due to play the NRL All Stars team on 13 February 2016.

=== 2016 ===
On 13 January 2016, Graham was named in the emerging New South Wales Blues squad. On 13 February 2016, Graham played for the Indigenous All Stars against the NRL All Stars, playing off the interchange bench in the 12–8 loss at Suncorp Stadium.

Graham made his debut for New South Wales in game 3 of the 2016 State of Origin series, after having originally been selected to debut in Game 2, however being ineligible due to a suspension resulting from a high tackle on Johnathan Thurston in Cronulla's Round 14 win over the North Queensland Cowboys.

On 2 October, Graham was part of the Cronulla side that won the 2016 grand final to claim the club's first ever premiership.

=== 2017 ===
In 2017, Graham was selected for the 2017 State of Origin series. Graham was part of the Cronulla side which finished 5th at the end of the season. On 10 September, Cronulla played North Queensland in the first week elimination finals and suffered a 15-14 shock defeat.

=== 2018 ===
In 2018, Graham was not selected for NSW by coach Brad Fittler for the 2018 State of Origin series due to being out with injury for most of the first half of the 2018 season. In week one of the 2018 NRL finals, Graham was taken from the field in the first half during Cronulla's match against Eastern Suburbs with subsequent scans revealing the player had torn his anterior cruciate ligament (ACL) ruling him out for the rest of the season.

=== 2019 ===
Graham made his return for Cronulla in round 13 against Parramatta, which Cronulla won 42–22. Graham was selected for Game 2 of the 2019 State of Origin series where he starred in New South Wales' 38–6 win at Perth Stadium. Graham was retained for Game 3 of the series, which New South Wales won 26–20 at ANZ Stadium. It was the first time since 2005 that New South Wales had won back to back series.

Graham was limited to ten appearances for Cronulla in the regular 2019 NRL season, where the club finished 7th. Graham played in the elimination final loss to Manly at Brookvale Oval.

On 30 September, Graham was named in the second row and as captain of the Australia PM XIII. On 7 October, Graham was named in the Australian team for the 2019 Rugby League World Cup 9s, as well as the upcoming Oceania Cup fixtures.

=== 2020 ===
Graham played 19 games for Cronulla in the 2020 NRL season as the club finished 8th and qualified for the finals. He played in Cronulla's elimination final loss against Canberra.

=== 2021 ===
Graham was limited to only 11 games for Cronulla in the 2021 NRL season which saw the club narrowly miss the finals by finishing 9th on the table. Graham decided to end his season prematurely due to three head concussions he sustained including two in consecutive weeks.

=== 2022 ===
Graham played a total of 18 games for Cronulla in the 2022 NRL season as the club finished second on the table and qualified for the finals. Graham played in both finals matches which saw Cronulla eliminated in straight sets.

For his player advocacy work, Graham was given the prestigious Rugby League Players Association Dennis Tutty Award. RLPA CEO Clint Newton said "In particular, Wade was incredibly influential in the roll-back of the restrictive COVID protocols NRL and NRLW players were facing in January, in working with the Association to negotiate the players’ share of outperformance, and now as we get to the table with the NRL to negotiate our joint-CBA."

=== 2023 ===
On 8 August, Graham announced his retirement at the end of the 2023 NRL season. In round 24 of the 2023 NRL season, Graham played his 250th game for Cronulla and scored a try in their 36-6 victory over the Gold Coast. In the 2023 elimination final, Graham would play his final game which was a 13-12 loss against the Sydney Roosters at Shark Park.

== Statistics ==
=== NRL ===
Statistics are correct as of the end of round 23 in the 2023 season

Season	Team	Matches	T	G	GK %	F/G	Pts
2008	Penrith Panthers	8	0	0	—	0	0
2009	Penrith Panthers	22	5	0	—	0	20
2010	Penrith Panthers	12	4	0	—	0	16
2011	Cronulla-Sutherland	24	6	0	—	2	26
2012	Cronulla-Sutherland	19	6	0	—	0	24
2013	Cronulla-Sutherland	23	2	0	—	0	8
2014	Cronulla-Sutherland	19	5	0	—	0	20
2015	Cronulla-Sutherland	26	4	0	—	0	16
2016	Cronulla-Sutherland	26	2	0	—	0	8
2017	Cronulla-Sutherland	22	5	0	—	0	20
2018	Cronulla-Sutherland	18	3	0	—	0	12
2019	Cronulla-Sutherland	10	1	0	—	0	4
2020	Cronulla-Sutherland	19	4	0	—	0	16
2021	Cronulla-Sutherland	11	0	0	—	0	0
2022	Cronulla-Sutherland	18	1	0	—	0	4
2023	Cronulla-Sutherland	15	2	0	—	0	8
Career totals		297	50	0	—	2	202

=== All Star ===
Season	Team	Matches	T	G	GK %	F/G	Pts
2016	Indigenous All Stars	1	0	0	—	0	0
2017	Indigenous All Stars	1	0	0	—	0	0
2020	Indigenous All Stars	1	0	0	—	0	0
Career totals		3	0	0	—	0	0

=== City vs Country ===
Season	Team	Matches	T	G	GK %	F/G	Pts
2013	NSW City	1	0	0	—	0	0
2015	NSW City	1	0	0	—	0	0
Career totals		2	0	0	—	0	0

=== State of Origin ===
Season	Team	Matches	T	G	GK %	F/G	Pts
2016	New South Wales	1	0	0	—	0	0
2017	New South Wales	3	0	0	—	0	0
2019	New South Wales	2	0	0	—	0	0
Career totals		6	0	0	—	0	0

=== International ===
Season	Team	Matches	T	G	GK %	F/G	Pts
2017	Australia	6	4	0	—	0	16
2019	Australia	2	0	0	—	0	0
Career totals		8	4	0	—	0	16
