= 2016 Cronulla-Sutherland Sharks season =

- 2016 NRL premiers
- NRL rank: 3rd
- 2016 record: Wins: 17; draws: 1; losses: 6
- Points scored: For: 580; against: 404

Team information
- CEO: Lyall Gorman
- Coach: Shane Flanagan
- Assistant coach: Steve Price
- Captains: Paul Gallen; Wade Graham Michael Ennis
- Stadium: Shark Park
- Avg. attendance: 14,577

Top scorers
- Tries: Valentine Holmes (19)
- Goals: James Maloney (94)
- Points: James Maloney (219)
← 2015	2017 →

The 2016 Cronulla-Sutherland Sharks season is the 50th in the club's history. Coached by Shane Flanagan and captained by Paul Gallen, they competed in the NRL's 2016 Telstra Premiership, finishing the regular season 3rd (out of 16) to make the finals.

In the first week on the finals, they took on the Canberra Raiders, who at that stage were on a 10-game winning streak, at GIO Stadium. A day before the game, Sharks captain, Paul Gallen did not take the trip and was ruled out with a back injury. 7 minutes into the game, stand-in captain Wade Graham was taken off the field and would not return due to a concussion. Despite playing with one less player (16) for more than 70 minutes, the Sharks managed to earn a week off and advance to the preliminary finals with a 16-14 win, one of the Sharks' more memorable wins in their history.

In the preliminary final, they took on the North Queensland Cowboys, who managed to narrowing beat the Brisbane Broncos in a 90-minute thriller the week before, at Allianz Stadium. Paul Gallen and Wade Graham returned from their respective injuries to line up in a near fully strengthened Cronulla side. With James Maloney and Chad Townsend leading the way, the Sharks defeated the Cowboys 32-20 to progress into the 2016 NRL Grand Final, their first grand final appearance since the 1997 Super League Season. It was only the fourth time they had appeared in a grand final in their history.

Playing in front of 83,625 fans, the Cronulla Sharks broke their 49 year drought without a premiership, with a 14-12 win over the minor premiers, the Melbourne Storm. It sent Michael Ennis out a winner in his final game in the NRL. The Clive Churchill Medal Winner was Luke Lewis.

== Results ==
- Round 1 - North Queensland Cowboys vs Cronulla Sharks (20-14)

Tries: Chad Townsend, Jack Bird

- Round 2 - Cronulla Sharks vs St George Illawarra Dragons (30-2)

Tries: Ben Barba, Valentine Holmes, Chad Townsend, Jayson Bukuya, Ricky Leutele

- Round 3 - Manly Sea Eagles vs Cronulla Sharks (22-12)

Tries: Luke Lewis, Valentine Holmes

- Round 4 - Cronulla Sharks vs Melbourne Storm (14-6)

Tries: Ben Barba, Chad Townsend

- Round 5 - Wests Tigers vs Cronulla Sharks (26-34)

Tries: Luke Lewis, James Maloney, Sosaia Feki, Paul Gallen, Ben Barba

- Round 6 - Cronulla Sharks vs Gold Coast Titans (25-20)

Tries: Ben Barba, Sosaia Feki, Matt Prior, Andrew Fifita, Valentine Holmes

Field Goal: Chad Townsend

- Round 7 - Canberra Raiders vs Cronulla Sharks (16-40)

Tries: Ben Barba (2), Jack Bird, Jayson Bukuya, Valentine Holmes, Matt Prior, James Maloney

- Round 8 - Cronulla Sharks vs Penrith Panthers (20-18)

Tries: Michael Ennis, James Maloney, Valentine Holmes

- Round 9 - Cronulla Sharks vs Brisbane Broncos (30-28)

Tries: Sosaia Feki (2), Paul Gallen, James Maloney, Chad Townsend

- Round 10 - Newcastle Knights vs Cronulla Sharks (0-62)

Tries: Valentine Holmes (4), Sosaia Feki (3), Luke Lewis (2), Ben Barba, Wade Graham

- Round 11 - Cronulla Sharks vs Manly Sea Eagles (20-12)

Tries: Sosaia Feki, Valentine Holmes, Ben Barba

- Round 13 - Canterbury Bulldogs vs Cronulla Sharks (18-20)

Tries: Chad Townsend, Valentine Holmes, Ben Barba, Ricky Leutele

- Round 14 - Cronulla Sharks vs North Queensland Cowboys (13-10)

Tries: Valentine Holmes

Field Goal: James Maloney

- Round 16 - Cronulla Sharks vs New Zealand Warriors (19-18)

Tries: Michael Ennis, Ricky Leutele, Jayson Bukuya

Field Goal: James Maloney

- Round 17 - Cronulla Sharks vs Parramatta Eels (34-24)

Sosaia Feki (2), Ricky Leutele (2), Gerard Beale (2)

- Round 18 - Penrith Panthers vs Cronulla Sharks (10-26)

Tries: Ben Barba (2), Mitch Brown, Joseph Paulo, Luke Lewis

- Round 19 - Sydney Roosters vs Cronulla Sharks (20-32)

Tries: Sosaia Feki (2), Valentine Holmes, Jack Bird, Luke Lewis, Chad Townsend

- Round 20 - Cronulla Sharks vs Newcastle Knights (36-4)

Tries: Jack Bird (2), Ben Barba (2), Valentine Holmes (2), Sosaia Feki, Gerard Beale

- Round 21 - Gold Coast Titans vs Cronulla Sharks (18-18)

Tries: Valentine Holmes, Jack Bird, Andrew Fifita

- Round 22 - Cronulla Sharks vs Canberra Raiders (14-30)

Tries: James Maloney, Paul Gallen

- Round 23 - St George Illawarra Dragons vs Cronulla Sharks (32-18)

Tries: Valentine Holmes, Ben Barba, Ricky Leutele

- Round 24 - South Sydney Rabbitohs vs Cronulla Sharks (12-6)

Tries: Wade Graham

- Round 25 - Cronulla Sharks vs Sydney Roosters (37-12)

Tries: Matt Prior, Ben Barba, Gerard Beale, Paul Gallen, Jayson Bukuya, Valentine Holmes

Field Goal: James Maloney

- Round 26 - Melbourne Storm vs Cronulla Sharks (26-6)

Tries: Gerard Beale

- Qualifying Finals - Canberra Raiders vs Cronulla Sharks (14-16)

Tries: Matt Prior, Valentine Holmes

- Preliminary Finals - Cronulla Sharks vs North Queensland Cowboys (32-20)

Tries: James Maloney (2), Sosaia Feki, Chad Townsend, Luke Lewis

- 2016 NRL Grand Final - Melbourne Storm vs Cronulla Sharks (12-14)

Tries: Ben Barba, Andrew Fifita

Clive Churchill Medal Winner: Luke Lewis

== Ladder ==
2016 NRL season
Pos	Team	Pld	W	D	L	B	PF	PA	PD	Pts
1	Melbourne Storm	24	19	0	5	2	563	302	+261	42
2	Canberra Raiders	24	17	1	6	2	688	456	+232	39
3	Cronulla-Sutherland Sharks (P)	24	17	1	6	2	580	404	+176	39
4	North Queensland Cowboys	24	15	0	9	2	584	355	+229	34
5	Brisbane Broncos	24	15	0	9	2	554	434	+120	34
6	Penrith Panthers	24	14	0	10	2	563	463	+100	32
7	Canterbury-Bankstown Bulldogs	24	14	0	10	2	506	448	+58	32
8	Gold Coast Titans	24	11	1	12	2	508	497	+11	27
9	Wests Tigers	24	11	0	13	2	499	607	−108	26
10	New Zealand Warriors	24	10	0	14	2	513	601	−88	24
11	St. George Illawarra Dragons	24	10	0	14	2	341	538	−197	24
12	South Sydney Rabbitohs	24	9	0	15	2	473	549	−76	22
13	Manly-Warringah Sea Eagles	24	8	0	16	2	454	563	−109	20
14	Parramatta Eels	24	13	0	11	2	298	324	−26	18^{1}
15	Sydney Roosters	24	6	0	18	2	443	576	−133	16
16	Newcastle Knights	24	1	1	22	2	305	800	−495	7

^{1} Parramatta were deducted 12 competition points and their for/against tally accumulated between rounds 1-9 for gross long-term salary cap breaches.

== 2016 Statistics ==
=== Top 5 Point Scorers ===
Points	Player	Tries	Goals	Field Goals
219	James Maloney	7	94	3
80	Valentine Holmes	19	2	0
64	Ben Barba	16	0	0
56	Sosaia Feki	14	0	0
45	Chad Townsend	8	6	1

=== Top 5 Try Scorers ===
Tries	Player
19	Valentine Holmes
16	Ben Barba
14	Sosaia Feki
8	Chad Townsend
7	Luke Lewis

=== Top 5 Try Assisters ===
Assists	Player
18	Ben Barba
13	Chad Townsend
13	Michael Ennis
10	Gerard Beale
9	James Maloney

=== Top 5 Tacklers ===
Tackles	Player
947	Michael Ennis
747	Andrew Fifita
673	Luke Lewis
663	Wade Graham
640	Jayson Bukuya

=== Top 5 Running Metres ===
Metres	Player
4,263	Andrew Fifita
3,509	Paul Gallen
3,391	Valentine Holmes
3,219	Wade Graham
2,904	Jack Bird
