= 2016 Canterbury-Bankstown Bulldogs season =

Canterbury-Bankstown Bulldogs
- 2016 season
- CEO: Raelene Castle
- Head coach: Des Hasler
- Captain: James Graham
- Top try scorer: Club: Sam Perrett (11)
- Top points scorer: Club: Moses Mbye (90)
- Highest home attendance: 30,018
- Lowest home attendance: 11,450
- Average home attendance: 16,362

The 2016 Canterbury-Bankstown Bulldogs season is the 82nd in the club's history. Coached by Des Hasler and captained by James Graham, they will compete in the National Rugby League's 2016 Telstra Premiership after finishing the 2015 season as semi-finalists.

== Fixtures ==
=== Regular season ===
The Bulldogs started the season strongly, comfortably beating the Manly-Warringah Sea Eagles in round one. The Bulldogs were the outsiders with the bookmakers, with most rugby league experts citing the size of the forward pack as an issue with the 2016 season rule change, which dropped the interchanges allowed from 10 to 8. However, the Bulldogs surprised the rugby league community by unveiling a significantly leaner pack, with players having shed a lot of weight during the off season. Sam Kasiano was an example of this, having lost 13 kg before the season kicked off. Any concerns about the interchange rule affecting the team were put to rest with the side coming away with a convincing 28-6 first round victory, and a week later a last minute win against the Penrith Panthers proving the big men would not falter late in matches as a result of more minutes played. As though the team was further driving the point home, they completed the second round match using only 16 of the 17 named players.

The month that followed was not as impressive, with the club going loss, win, loss, win, for a 4-3 record after 7 rounds.

Round	Home	Score	Away	Match information
Round	Home	Score	Away	Date and time	Venue	Crowd
1	Manly-Warringah Sea Eagles	6-28	Canterbury Bankstown Bulldogs	Fri 4 Mar 2016, 8:05pm AEDT	Brookvale Oval	16,512
2	Penrith Panthers	16-18	Canterbury Bankstown Bulldogs	Thu 10 Mar 2016, 8:05pm AEDT	Pepper Stadium	11,125
3	Canterbury Bankstown Bulldogs	6-20	Parramatta Eels	Fri 18 Mar 2016, 8:05pm AEDT	ANZ Stadium	30,018
4	South Sydney Rabbitohs	12-42	Canterbury Bankstown Bulldogs	Fri 25 Mar 2016, 4:00pm AEDT	ANZ Stadium	38,192
5	Canterbury Bankstown Bulldogs	8-22	Canberra Raiders	Mon 4 Apr 2016, 7:00pm AEST	Belmore Sports Ground	13,463
6	Melbourne Storm	12-18	Canterbury Bankstown Bulldogs	Mon 11 Apr 2016, 7:00pm AEST	AAMI Stadium	11,037
7	Canterbury Bankstown Bulldogs	20-24	New Zealand Warriors	Sat 16 Apr 2016, 7:30pm NZST	Westpac Stadium	18,212
8	Canterbury Bankstown Bulldogs	21-20	Gold Coast Titans	Sat 23 Apr 2016, 3:00pm AEST	ANZ Stadium	11,450
9	Parramatta Eels	20-12	Canterbury Bankstown Bulldogs	Fri 29 Apr 2016, 7:50pm AEST	ANZ Stadium	31,815
10	Wests Tigers	4-36	Canterbury Bankstown Bulldogs	Sun 15 May 2016, 4:00pm AEST	ANZ Stadium	20.936
11	Canterbury Bankstown Bulldogs	32-20	Sydney Roosters	Sun 22 May 2016, 4:00pm AEST	ANZ Stadium	17,704
12	Canberra Raiders	32-20	Canterbury Bankstown Bulldogs	Sun 29 May 2016, 4:00pm AEST	GIO Stadium	13,907
13	Canterbury Bankstown Bulldogs	18-20	Cronulla Sharks	Mon 6 Jun 2016, 7:00pm AEST	ANZ Stadium	10,081
14	St. George Illawarra Dragons	16-34	Canterbury Bankstown Bulldogs	Mon 13 Jun 2016, 4:00pm AEST	ANZ Stadium	20,153
15		BYE
16	Canterbury Bankstown Bulldogs	40-14	Brisbane Broncos	Sat 25 Jun 2016, 7:30pm AEST	ANZ Stadium	10,106
17	Sydney Roosters	20-24	Canterbury Bankstown Bulldogs	Thu 30 Jun 2016, 7:50pm AEST	Sydney Football Stadium	7,741
18	Canterbury Bankstown Bulldogs	32-22	Wests Tigers	Sat 9 Jul 2016, 7:30pm AEST	ANZ Stadium	16,212
19		BYE
20	North Queensland Cowboys	36-0	Canterbury Bankstown Bulldogs	Thu 21 Jul 2016, 7:50pm AEST	1300 Smiles Stadium	11,620
21	Canterbury Bankstown Bulldogs	13-10	St. George Illawarra Dragons	Fri 29 Jul 2016, 7:50pm AEST	ANZ Stadium	15,008
22	Newcastle Knights	14-28	Canterbury Bankstown Bulldogs	Sat 6 Aug 2016, 3:00pm AEST	Hunter Stadium	13,318
23	Canterbury Bankstown Bulldogs	20-16	Manly-Warringah Sea Eagles	Thu 11 Aug 2016, 7:50pm AEST	ANZ Stadium	10,290
24	Brisbane Broncos	20-10	Canterbury Bankstown Bulldogs	Thu 18 Aug 2016, 7:50pm AEST	Suncorp Stadium	27,746
25	Canterbury Bankstown Bulldogs	16-24	North Queensland Cowboys	Thu 25 Aug 2016, 7:50pm AEST	Belmore Sports Ground	10,144
26	Canterbury-Bankstown Bulldogs	10-28	South Sydney Rabbitohs	Fri 2 Sep 2016, 7:50pm AEST	ANZ Stadium	14,731
Qualif Final	Penrith Panthers	12-28	Canterbury-Bankstown Bulldogs	Sun 11 Sep 2016, 4:10pm AEST	Allianz Stadium	22,631
Legend: Win Loss Draw Bye

== Ladder ==
2016 NRL season
Pos	Team	Pld	W	D	L	B	PF	PA	PD	Pts
1	Melbourne Storm	24	19	0	5	2	563	302	+261	42
2	Canberra Raiders	24	17	1	6	2	688	456	+232	39
3	Cronulla-Sutherland Sharks (P)	24	17	1	6	2	580	404	+176	39
4	North Queensland Cowboys	24	15	0	9	2	584	355	+229	34
5	Brisbane Broncos	24	15	0	9	2	554	434	+120	34
6	Penrith Panthers	24	14	0	10	2	563	463	+100	32
7	Canterbury-Bankstown Bulldogs	24	14	0	10	2	506	448	+58	32
8	Gold Coast Titans	24	11	1	12	2	508	497	+11	27
9	Wests Tigers	24	11	0	13	2	499	607	−108	26
10	New Zealand Warriors	24	10	0	14	2	513	601	−88	24
11	St. George Illawarra Dragons	24	10	0	14	2	341	538	−197	24
12	South Sydney Rabbitohs	24	9	0	15	2	473	549	−76	22
13	Manly-Warringah Sea Eagles	24	8	0	16	2	454	563	−109	20
14	Parramatta Eels	24	13	0	11	2	298	324	−26	18^{1}
15	Sydney Roosters	24	6	0	18	2	443	576	−133	16
16	Newcastle Knights	24	1	1	22	2	305	800	−495	7

^{1} Parramatta were deducted 12 competition points and their for/against tally accumulated between rounds 1-9 for gross long-term salary cap breaches.

== See also ==
- List of Canterbury-Bankstown Bulldogs seasons
