= Indigenous All-Stars =

Indigenous All-Stars may refer to:

- Indigenous All-Stars (Australian football), a representative Australian rules football team made up of indigenous Australian players
- Indigenous All-Stars (rugby league), a representative rugby league football team made up of indigenous Australian players
