= 2016 All Stars match =

Australian rugby league match

Indigenous All Stars	World All Stars
8	12
	1	2	3	4	Total
IND	0	4	0	4	8
WAS	0	4	8	0	12
- Date: Saturday 13 February 2016
- Stadium: Suncorp Stadium
- Location: Brisbane
- Preston Campbell Medal: James Graham (WAS)
- Advance Australia Fair: Jessica Mauboy
- Referees: Matt Cecchin, Allan Shortall
- Attendance: 37,339

Broadcast partners
- Broadcasters: Nine Network
- Commentators: Mat Thompson Peter Sterling Wally Lewis Andrew Johns

The 2016 All Stars match was the sixth annual representative exhibition All Stars match. For the first time, the match was played between the Indigenous All Stars and a World All Stars team.

== Teams ==
INDIGENOUS ALL STARS	Position	WORLD ALL STARS
Greg Inglis (c)	Fullback	(New Zealand) Jordan Kahu
Edrick Lee	Wing	(Fiji) Semi Radradra
Will Chambers	Centre	(Australia) Jarrod Croker
James Roberts	Centre	(Australia) Josh Morris
Dane Gagai	Wing	(Papua New Guinea) Nene Macdonald
Ben Barba	Five-eighth	(England) Gareth Widdop
Tyrone Roberts	Halfback	(Australia) Adam Reynolds
Ryan James	Prop	(England) James Graham
Craig Garvey	Hooker	(Australia) Cameron Smith (c)
Andrew Fifita	Prop	(England) Tom Burgess
Joel Thompson	2nd Row	(Samoa) Martin Taupau
Sam Thaiday	2nd Row	(Australia) Ryan Hoffman
Greg Bird	Lock	(New Zealand) Jeremy Smith
Tyrone Peachey	Interchange	(Australia) Michael Ennis
Jack Wighton	Interchange	(Fiji) Kane Evans
Wade Graham	Interchange	(Tonga) Konrad Hurrell
Jamie Soward	Interchange	(Australia) Trent Merrin
David Fifita	Interchange	(Australia) Beau Scott
Leilani Latu	Interchange	(Samoa) Matthew Wright
Will Smith	Interchange	-
Laurie Daley	Coach	Wayne Bennett

^{1} - Tyson Frizell was originally selected to play but withdrew due to injury. He was replaced by Jeremy Smith.
^{2} - Robbie Farah was originally selected to play but withdrew to instead attend Super Bowl 50. He was replaced by Michael Ennis.
^{3} - Johnathan Thurston was originally selected to play but withdrew to instead participate in the World Club Series. Greg Inglis was handed the captaincy. Tyrone Roberts was moved from the bench to Halfback and Thurston was replaced by Jamie Soward.
^{4} - Lachlan Maranta was originally selected to play but withdrew due to injury. He was replaced by Jordan Kahu.
^{5} - Blake Ferguson was originally selected to play but withdrew due to injury. James Roberts was moved from the bench to the Centres and Ferguson was replaced by Edrick Lee.
^{6} - Nathan Peats was originally selected to play but withdrew due to injury. Ray Thompson was moved from the bench to Hooker and Peats was replaced by Craig Garvey.
^{7} - Trent Hodkinson was originally selected to play but withdrew. He was replaced by Adam Reynolds.
^{8} - Sam Burgess was originally selected to play but withdrew and Chris Lawrence was added to the team.
^{9} - Simon Mannering withdrew due to the birth of his son and was replaced by Ryan Hoffman.
^{10} - Roger Tuivasa-Sheck withdrew due to injury. Jordan Kahu moved to fullback and Konrad Hurrell was added to the bench.
^{11} - Chris Grevsmuhl and Alex Johnston were both withdrawn from the squad and replaced by David Fifita and Leilani Latu. Andrew Fifita was promoted to the starting side, with Sam Thaiday shifting to the back row in place of Grevsmuhl. Edrick Lee started on the wing in place of Johnston, with David Fifita and Latu joining the interchange bench.
^{12} - Matthew Wright and Beau Scott replaced Antonio Winterstein and Paul Gallen.
^{13} - Chris Lawrence was a last minute withdrawal from the World All Stars line up. He was replaced in the starting side by Martin Taupau. The lateness of Lawrence's withdrawal meant the World All Stars only had a 19-man squad.

=== World All Star selection ===
The World All Stars team was planned to feature a minimum of four players each from Australia, New Zealand and England, while the remaining players were planned to be made up from other nations such as Fiji, Samoa, Tonga, PNG and France. However, only three New Zealand players were selected. The World All Stars team had to include at least one player – and a maximum of two players - from each NRL club. The Australia, New Zealand and England captains were planned to be automatic selections for the team, however Super League players were not available for selection which included the English captain.

Australia	New Zealand	England	Others
Cameron Smith; Jarrod Croker; Josh Morris; Adam Reynolds; Beau Scott; Chris Lawrence*; Trent Merrin; Michael Ennis; Ryan Hoffman	Martin Taupau; Jordan Kahu; Jeremy Smith	James Graham; Gareth Widdop; Tom Burgess	(Fiji) Semi Radradra (Fiji) Kane Evans (Samoa) Matthew Wright (Papua New Guinea) Nene Macdonald (Tonga) Konrad Hurrell
Total: 9	Total: 3	Total: 3	Total: 5

* - Chris Lawrence was a last minute withdrawal. Due to the lateness he was not replaced.

== Result ==
13 February 2016
7.05pm (AEST)

Indigenous All Stars
Tries:
Leilani Latu (40') 1
Dane Gagai (63') 1

Goals:
Jamie Soward 0/2

8 – 12

World All Stars
Tries:
Konrad Hurrell (32') 1
Semi Radradra (42') 1

Goals:
Jarrod Croker 0/1
Adam Reynolds 2/2

Suncorp Stadium
Attendance: 37,399
Preston Campbell Medal: James Graham
Referee: Matt Cecchin & Allan Shortall

== Women's All Stars match ==
2016 Women All Stars match
Indigenous Women All Stars	Women All Stars
4	24
	1	Total
IND	0	4
WAS	10	24
- Date: Saturday 13 February 2016
- Stadium: Suncorp Stadium
- Location: Brisbane
- Woman of the Match: Maddie Studdon
- Advance Australia Fair: TBA
- Referees: Jarred Maxwell, Ben Cummins

Broadcast partners

For the fifth time, a Women's match was held as part of the fixture.

=== Women's Teams ===
INDIGENOUS WOMEN ALL STARS	Position	WOMEN ALL STARS
Casey Karklis	Fullback	Sam Hammond
Latoya Billy	Wing	Karina Brown
Tallisha Harden (c)	Centre	Annette Brander
Caitlyn Moran	Centre	Corban McGregor
Narikah Johnson	Wing	Chelsea Baker
Nakia Davis-Welsh	Five-eighth	Allana Ferguson
Jenni-Sue Hoepper	Halfback	Maddie Studdon
Rebecca Young	Prop	Steph Hancock (c)
Kelsey Parkins	Hooker	Brittany Breayley
Ashleigh Singleton	Prop	Heather Ballinger
Emma-Marie Young	2nd Row	Kezie Apps
Jasmin Allende	2nd Row	Renae Kunst
Elizabeth Cook-Black	Lock	Ruan Sims
Lauren Motlop	Interchange	Charmayne Nathan
Simone Smith	Interchange	Kody House
Lavina Phillips	Interchange	Vanessa Foliaki
Rebecca Riley	Interchange	Simaima Taufa-Kautai
Carly Phillips	Interchange	Shanice Parker
Dean Widders	Coach	Steve Folkes

=== Result ===
The Women's All Stars exhibition match was held as a curtain raiser for the men's 2016 All Stars match and was won by the NRL Women's All Stars.

13 February 2016
7.15pm (AEST)

Indigenous Woman All Stars	4 – 24	Woman All Stars team
Tries: 1 Elizabeth Cook-Black; Goals: nil	Report; Report	Tries: 5; 2 Heather Ballinger; Chelsea Baker; Shanice Parker; Sam Bremner; Goals: 2; 2 Maddie Studdon

Suncorp Stadium
Attendance:
:
Referee: Jarred Maxwell & Ben Cummins
Player of the Match: Maddie Studdon
