= 2014 Gold Coast Titans season =

- NRL Rank: 14th
- 2014 record: Wins: 9; draws: 0; losses: 15
- Points scored: For: 372; against: 538

Team information
- CEO: Graham Annesley
- Coach: John Cartwright → Neil Henry
- Captain: Greg Bird Nate Myles
- Stadium: Cbus Super Stadium
- Avg. attendance: 13,196
- High attendance: 20,524 (vs. Brisbane Broncos, Rd 6)

Top scorers
- Tries: Anthony Don (9)
- Goals: Aidan Sezer (23)
- Points: Aidan Sezer (63)
← 2013	List of seasons	2015 →

The 2014 Gold Coast Titans season was the 8th in the club's history. Coached by John Cartwright and co-captained by Greg Bird and Nate Myles, they competed in the NRL's 2014 Telstra Premiership. During the second half of the season Cartwright resigned, and his position as head coach was taken by assistant coach Neil Henry for the remainder of the season. Gold Coast finished the regular season in 14th (out of 16) and failed to qualify the finals for the fourth consecutive year.

== Season summary ==
On 7 January, the Titans released Jamal Idris from the remaining 3 years of his contract so he could return to Sydney to be closer to his family. In a deal between the Titans and the Penrith Panthers, Idris joined the Panthers on a three-year deal and Brad Tighe moved from the Panthers to the Titans.

=== Milestones ===
- Round 1: Luke Douglas plays his 195th consecutive NRL game, surpassing Jason Taylor's record of 194
- Round 1: Maurice Blair and Brad Tighe made their debuts for the club
- Round 1: Paul Carter made his first grade debut
- Round 2: Luke Douglas and Ben Ridge played their 50th game for the club
- Round 2: Aidan Sezer scored his 200th career point
- Round 3: Paul Carter scored his 1st career try
- Round 5: Brad Takairangi played his 50th career game
- Round 6: Luke Douglas played his 200th career game
- Round 6: Kevin Gordon played his 100th game for the club
- Round 8: Cody Nelson made his first grade debut
- Round 9: Nate Myles played his 50th game for the club
- Round 10: Kalifa Faifai Loa made his debut for the club
- Round 11: David Mead played his 100th game for the club
- Round 14: Caleb Binge made his first grade debut
- Round 14: James Roberts made his debut for the club
- Round 15: Daniel Mortimer made his debut for the club
- Round 15: Matt White play his 100th game for the club
- Round 17: Tom Kingston made his first grade debut
- Round 17: Mark Minichiello played his 250th career game
- Round 22: Dave Taylor played his 150th career game
- Round 23: Aidan Sezer played his 5oth career game
- Round 24: Luke Bailey played his 150th game for the club
- Round 24: Daniel Mortimer played his 100th career game

== Squad List ==
Gold Coast Titans
First team squad			Coaching staff
Luke Bailey – PR; Matt Beddow – HB, HK; Caleb Binge – PR; Greg Bird (c) – SR; Maurice Blair – CE, FE, LK; Paul Carter – SR, HK; Anthony Don – FB, WG; Luke Douglas – PR; Jamie Dowling – FB, WG; Kalifa Faifai Loa – WG, CE, FB; Beau Falloon – HK; Jamal Fogarty – FE, FB; Kevin Gordon – WG, CE	Ashley Harrison – LK, SR; Christian Hazard – HB, FE; Beau Henry – FE, HB; Jahrome Hughes – FB; Mark Ioane – PR; Sam Irwin – HK, HB; Ryan James – PR, SR; Albert Kelly – HB, FE; Tom Kingston – SR; Siuatonga Likiliki – CE, WG, SR; David Mead – WG, FB; Steve Michaels – CE, WG; Mark Minichiello – SR	Daniel Mortimer – HB; Nate Myles (c) – HB, FE; Cody Nelson – LK, FE; Ben Ridge – SR; James Roberts – CE, WG; Aidan Sezer – FE; Matt Srama – HK, HB; Brad Takairangi – CE, SR; Dave Taylor – SR; Brad Tighe – CE; Matt White – PR; William Zillman – FB, FE	Head coach: John Cartwright; Assistant coach: Neil Henry; Legend: (c) Captain(s); (vc) Vice-captain(s); Updated: 30 December 2013; Source(s): Titans Squad

== Squad Movement ==
=== Gains ===
Player	Signed from	Until end of	Notes
Maurice Blair	Melbourne Storm	2015	
Paul Carter	Canterbury-Bankstown Bulldogs	2015	
Kalifa Faifai Loa	North Queensland Cowboys	2015	
Christian Hazard	South Sydney Rabbitohs	2015	
Tom Kingston	Tweed Heads Seagulls	2014	
Siuatonga Likiliki	Newcastle Knights	2014	
Daniel Mortimer	Sydney Roosters (Mid-Season)	2016	
James Roberts	Penrith Panthers (Mid-season)	2015	
Brad Tighe	Penrith Panthers	2015	

=== Losses ===
Player	Signed from	Until end of	Notes
Marmin Barba	Brisbane Broncos	2015	
Hymel Hunt	Melbourne Storm	2014	
Jamal Idris	Penrith Panthers	2016	
Luke O'Dwyer	Retirement	-	
Jordan Rankin	Hull F.C.	2015	
Matty Russell	Warrington Wolves	2015	

=== Re-Signings ===
Player	Signed from	Until end of	Notes
Anthony Don	Gold Coast Titans	2016	
Luke Douglas	Gold Coast Titans	2017	
Kane Elgey	Gold Coast Titans	2015	
Kevin Gordon	Gold Coast Titans	2017	
Ryan James	Gold Coast Titans	2017	
Tom Kingston	Gold Coast Titans	2015	
Matt White	Gold Coast Titans	2016	

=== Contract Lengths ===
Player	2014	2015	2016	2017	2018	Source
Luke Bailey	Gold Coast Titans	Retirement				
Ashley Harrison	Gold Coast Titans	Retirement				
Sam Irwin	Gold Coast Titans	Featherstone Rovers				
Steve Michaels	Gold Coast Titans	Hull FC				
Mark Minichiello	Gold Coast Titans	Hull FC				
Cody Nelson	Gold Coast Titans	Parramatta Eels				
Siuatonga Likiliki	Gold Coast Titans					
Maurice Blair	Gold Coast Titans	Gold Coast Titans				
Paul Carter	Gold Coast Titans	Gold Coast Titans				
Kalifa Faifai Loa	Gold Coast Titans	Gold Coast Titans				
Christian Hazard	Gold Coast Titans	Gold Coast Titans				
James Roberts	Gold Coast Titans	Gold Coast Titans				
Brad Tighe	Gold Coast Titans	Gold Coast Titans				
Daniel Mortimer	Gold Coast Titans	Gold Coast Titans	Gold Coast Titans			

== Ladder ==
2014 NRL season
Pos	Team	Pld	W	D	L	B	PF	PA	PD	Pts
1	Sydney Roosters	24	16	0	8	2	615	385	+230	36
2	Manly Warringah Sea Eagles	24	16	0	8	2	502	399	+103	36
3	South Sydney Rabbitohs (P)	24	15	0	9	2	585	361	+224	34
4	Penrith Panthers	24	15	0	9	2	506	426	+80	34
5	North Queensland Cowboys	24	14	0	10	2	596	406	+190	32
6	Melbourne Storm	24	14	0	10	2	536	460	+76	32
7	Canterbury-Bankstown Bulldogs	24	13	0	11	2	446	439	+7	30
8	Brisbane Broncos	24	12	0	12	2	549	456	+93	28
9	New Zealand Warriors	24	12	0	12	2	571	491	+80	28
10	Parramatta Eels	24	12	0	12	2	477	580	−103	28
11	St. George Illawarra Dragons	24	11	0	13	2	469	528	−59	26
12	Newcastle Knights	24	10	0	14	2	463	571	−108	24
13	Wests Tigers	24	10	0	14	2	420	631	−211	24
14	Gold Coast Titans	24	9	0	15	2	372	538	−166	22
15	Canberra Raiders	24	8	0	16	2	466	623	−157	20
16	Cronulla-Sutherland Sharks	24	5	0	19	2	334	613	−279	14

== Fixtures ==
=== Pre-season ===
Date	Round	Opponent	Venue	Score	Tries	Goals	Attendance
Sunday, 9 February	Trial 1	New Zealand Warriors	North Harbour Stadium	36 – 18	Carter, Tighe, Kelly, Blair, Hazard, Beddow, Faifai Loa	Faifai Loa (4)	
Saturday, 22 February	Trial 2	North Queensland Cowboys	Clive Berghofer Stadium	12 – 28	Bird, Ioane	Sezer (2)	8,532
Legend: Win Loss Draw

==== NRL Auckland Nines ====
The NRL Auckland Nines is a pre-season rugby league nines competition featuring all 16 NRL clubs. The 2014 competition was played over two days on 15 and 16 February at Eden Park in Auckland, New Zealand. The Titans featured in Pool Blue and played the Sharks, Knights and Tigers. The Titans failed to qualify for the quarter finals.

Pool Blue
Team	Pld	W	D	L	PF	PA	PD	Pts
Newcastle Knights	3	2	0	1	62	29	33	4
Cronulla-Sutherland Sharks	3	2	0	1	60	47	13	4
Gold Coast Titans	3	1	0	2	50	62	-12	2
Wests Tigers	3	1	0	2	28	62	-34	2

Date	Time (Local)	Round	Opponent	Venue	Score	Tries	Goals
Saturday, 15 February	1:00pm	Round 1	Wests Tigers	Eden Park	22 – 7	Gordon, Carter, Mead, Likiliki, Faifai Loa	Kelly (1)
Saturday, 15 Saturday	4:45pm	Round 2	Newcastle Knights	Eden Park	14 – 25	Tighe (2) [Bonus Tries]	Gordon (2)
Sunday, 16 February	12:00pm	Round 3	Cronulla-Sutherland Sharks	Eden Park	14 – 30	Minichiello (2), Kelly	Kelly (1)
Legend: Win Loss

=== Regular season ===
Date	Round	Opponent	Venue	Score	Tries	Goals	Attendance
Monday, 10 March	Round 1	Cronulla-Sutherland Sharks	Remondis Stadium	18 – 12	Bird, Kelly, Zillman	Sezer (3/4)	9,321
Sunday, 16 March	Round 2	Wests Tigers	Cbus Super Stadium	12 – 42	Sezer, Kelly	Sezer (2/2)	12,038
Sunday, 23 March	Round 3	Canberra Raiders	GIO Stadium	24 – 12	Kelly (2), Carter, Falloon	Bird (4/6)	9,636
Monday, 31 March	Round 4	North Queensland Cowboys	Cbus Super Stadium	13 – 12	Gordon, Tighe	Brid (1/1), Sezer (1/1) & (FG)	9,482
Sunday, 6 April	Round 5	Melbourne Storm	AAMI Park	28 – 26	Gordon, Tighe, Mead, Kelly, Minichiello	Bird (4/6)	11,930
Friday, 11 April	Round 6	Brisbane Broncos	Cbus Super Stadium	12 – 8	Mead, Sezer	Sezer (2/2), Bird (0/1)	20,524
Monday, 21 April	Round 7	Penrith Panthers	Sportingbet Stadium	12 – 14	James, Sezer	Sezer (2/2)	9,555
Sunday, 27 April	Round 8	Wests Tigers	Leichhardt Oval	22 – 6	Sezer, Don, Bird	Sezer (2/3), Bird (3/4)	8,929
Saturday, 10 May	Round 9	South Sydney Rabbitohs	Cbus Super Stadium	18 – 40	Don (2), Taylor	Sezer (3/3)	19,107
Friday, 16 May	Round 10	Brisbane Broncos	Suncorp Stadium	8 – 22	Don	Sezer (1/1), Henry (1/2)	31,380
Saturday, 24 May	Round 11	New Zealand Warriors	Cbus Super Stadium	16 – 24	Taylor (3)	Henry (2/3)	18,753
	Round 12	Bye					
Saturday, 7 June	Round 13	Penrith Panthers	Cbus Super Stadium	14 – 36	Douglas, Mead	Gordon (3/3)	10,507
Monday, 16 June	Round 14	Melbourne Storm	Cbus Super Stadium	20 – 24	Gordon (2), Tighe, Roberts	Gordon (2/5)	6,497
Sunday, 22 June	Round 15	St. George Illawarra Dragons	Cbus Super Stadium	18 – 19	Gordon, Minichiello, Takairangi	Bird (2/2), Mortimer (1/1)	12,189
	Round 16	Bye					
Monday, 7 July	Round 17	South Sydney Rabbitohs	ANZ Stadium	14 – 10	Mead, Zillman, Gordon	Gordon (1/1)	10,925
Sunday, 13 July	Round 18	Canberra Raiders	Cbus Super Stadium	20 – 36	Faifai Loa (2), Roberts, Gordon	Gordon (2/4)	10,574
Sunday, 20 July	Round 19	Newcastle Knights	Hunter Stadium	22 – 8	Don, Taylor, Minichiello, Roberts	Gordon (3/4)	26,401
Saturday, 26 July	Round 20	Parramatta Eels	Cbus Super Stadium	18 – 24	Taylor, Don, Roberts	Gordon (3/4)	14,175
Saturday, 2 August	Round 21	North Queensland Cowboys	1300SMILES Stadium	8 – 28	Takairangi	Gordon (2/2)	14,487
Monday, 11 August	Round 22	Sydney Roosters	Allianz Stadium	18 – 26	Don, Taylor, Bird	Sezer (3/3)	6,345
Sunday, 17 August	Round 23	Manly-Warringah Sea Eagles	Cbus Super Stadium	12 – 15	Roberts, Faifai Loa	Sezer (2/2)	11,940
Sunday, 24 August	Round 24	St. George Illawarra Dragons	WIN Jubilee Oval	6 – 34	Don	Sezer (1/1)	9,584
Sunday, 31 August	Round 25	New Zealand Warriors	Mt. Smart Stadium	0 – 42			13,540
Sunday, 7 September	Round 26	Canterbury-Bankstown Bulldogs	Cbus Super Stadium	19 – 18	Faifai Loa, Don, Minichiello, Takairangi	Sezer (1/3), Mortimer (0/1), Zillman (FG)	12,563
Legend: Win Loss Draw Bye

== Statistics ==
Name	App	T	G	FG	Pts
Luke Bailey	18	0	0	0	0
Caleb Binge	2	0	0	0	0
Greg Bird	17	3	14	0	40
Maurice Blair	14	0	0	0	0
Paul Carter	21	1	0	0	4
Anthony Don	15	9	0	0	36
Luke Douglas	21	1	0	0	4
Kalifa Faifai Loa	9	4	0	0	16
Beau Falloon	23	1	0	0	4
Kevin Gordon	18	7	16	0	60
Ashley Harrison	10	0	0	0	0
Beau Henry	3	0	3	0	6
Mark Ioane	11	0	0	0	0
Ryan James	4	1	0	0	4
Albert Kelly	12	5	0	0	20
Tom Kingston	6	0	0	0	0
David Mead	18	4	0	0	16
Steve Michaels	2	0	0	0	0
Mark Minichiello	23	4	0	0	16
Daniel Mortimer	11	0	1	0	2
Nate Myles	18	0	0	0	0
Cody Nelson	8	0	0	0	0
Ben Ridge	5	0	0	0	0
James Robers	12	5	0	0	20
Aidan Sezer	13	4	23	1	63
Matt Srama	6	0	0	0	0
Brad Takairangi	21	3	0	0	12
Dave Taylor	19	7	0	0	28
Brad Tighe	9	3	0	0	12
Matt White	22	0	0	0	0
William Zillman	16	2	0	1	9
Totals		64	57	2	372

== Representatives ==
The following players have played a representative match in 2014

	City vs Country	ANZAC Test	State Of Origin 1	State Of Origin 2	State of Origin 3	Four Nations
Greg Bird	-	Kangaroos	-	New South Wales	New South Wales	
Beau Falloon	City	-	-	-	-	
Kevin Gordon	Country	-	-	-	-	
David Mead	Country	-	-	-	-	
Nate Myles	-	Kangaroos	Queensland	Queensland	Queensland	
Dave Taylor	-	-	-	Queensland	Queensland	

== Honours ==
=== League ===
- Nil

=== Club ===
- Paul Broughton Medal: Beau Falloon
- Community Award: Ryan James
- 'The Preston': Luke Bailey
- Rookie of the year: Paul Carter
- Members Choice: Luke Bailey
- U/20s Player of the year: Anthony Colman
