= 2014 NRL Auckland Nines =

Australian rugby league nines tournament

Tournament information
- Location: Eden Park
- Dates: 15 February–16 February
- Teams: 16

Final positions
- Champions: North Queensland Cowboys (1 title)
- Runner-up: Brisbane Broncos

Tournament statistics
- Matches played: 31
- Points scored: 895 (28.87 per match)
- Tries scored: 177 (5.71 per match)
- Attendance: 89,000
- MVP: Shaun Johnson
- Top scorer: Shaun Johnson (40)
- Top try scorer(s): Kyle Feldt (5); Semi Radradra (5)

The 2014 NRL Auckland Nines (known as the Dick Smith NRL Auckland Nines due to sponsorship) was the first NRL Auckland Nines tournament, contested between all sixteen teams of the National Rugby League. The draw was released on 30 October 2013. It was a two-day, nine-a-side, knockout tournament held at Eden Park in Auckland, New Zealand. All sixteen NRL clubs and 256 players competed over the one weekend (February 15 – February 16) with AUD$2.25 million prize money split between the teams. The North Queensland Cowboys won the tournament defeating the Brisbane Broncos 16 – 7.

== Tournament games ==
=== Yellow pool ===
| Pos | Team | Pld | W | D | L | PF | PA | PD | Pts |
|---|---|---|---|---|---|---|---|---|---|
| 1 | New Zealand Warriors | 3 | 3 | 0 | 0 | 80 | 41 | +39 | 6 |
| 2 | North Queensland Cowboys | 3 | 1 | 0 | 2 | 55 | 45 | +10 | 2 |
| 3 | Canberra Raiders | 3 | 1 | 0 | 2 | 32 | 53 | −21 | 2 |
| 4 | Manly Warringah Sea Eagles | 3 | 1 | 0 | 2 | 25 | 53 | −28 | 2 |

| 15 February 2014 | New Zealand Warriors | 25 – 14 | Canberra Raiders | Auckland, New Zealand |
| 14:25 NZDT | Bonus point tries: Johnson 6' c Tries: Fisiiahi 3' c Matagi 11' c Kata 15' c Conversions: Johnson (3/3), Tomkins (1/1) | [Report Report] | Tries: Cornish 1'; Heffernan 15' c Kennedy 18'; Conversions: Cornish (0/1), Buttriss (1/1), Robinson (0/1) | Stadium: Eden Park; Attendance: 43,600; Referee: Gavin Badger |

2:50pm, 15 February

| Manly Sea Eagles | 17 – 8 | North Queensland Cowboys |
|---|---|---|
| Blair (5), Williams (4), Hiku (4), Cherry-Evans (4) | Report | Feldt (4), Rona (4) |

Eden Park

6:10pm, 15 February

| New Zealand Warriors | 27 – 4 | Manly Sea Eagles |
|---|---|---|
| Johnson (11), Kata (4), Peyroux (4), Fusitua (4), Lolohea (4) | Report | Hasson (4) |

Eden Park
Referee: Matt Cecchin

6:35pm, 15 February

| Canberra Raiders | 0 – 24 | North Queensland Cowboys |
|---|---|---|
| | Report | Cooper (5), Bowen (5), Thompson (4), Linnett (4), Feldt (4), Lui (2) |

Eden Park

1:45pm, 16 February

| New Zealand Warriors | 28 – 23 | North Queensland Cowboys |
|---|---|---|
| Johnson (11), Ikahihifo (9), Tuimavave (4), Laumape (4) | Report | Winterstein (8), Feldt (6), Santo (5), Linnett (4) |

Eden Park

2:10pm, 16 February

| Canberra Raiders | 18 – 4 | Manly Sea Eagles |
|---|---|---|
| Robinson (8), Heffernan (4), Tupou (4), Ahearn (2) | Report | Satini (4) |

Eden Park

=== Green pool ===
| Pos | Team | Pld | W | D | L | PF | PA | PD | Pts |
|---|---|---|---|---|---|---|---|---|---|
| 1 | Parramatta Eels | 3 | 2 | 0 | 1 | 55 | 32 | +23 | 4 |
| 2 | Brisbane Broncos | 3 | 2 | 0 | 1 | 42 | 32 | +10 | 4 |
| 3 | Sydney Roosters | 3 | 1 | 0 | 2 | 29 | 41 | −12 | 2 |
| 4 | Canterbury Bulldogs | 3 | 1 | 0 | 2 | 26 | 46 | −20 | 2 |

| 15 February 2014 | Sydney Roosters | 11 – 18 | Parramatta Eels | Auckland, New Zealand |
| 13:25 NZDT | Bonus point tries: Pearce 9' c Tries: Tupou 9'; Conversions: Pearce (1/2) | [Report Report] | Tries: Radradra 4' c, 5', 13'; Toutai 11'; Conversions: Sandow (1/4) | Stadium: Eden Park; Attendance: 43,600; Referee: Brett Suttor |

| 15 February 2014 | Brisbane Broncos | 20 – 4 | Canterbury Bulldogs | Auckland, New Zealand |
| 13:50 NZDT | Tries: Copley 9'; McCullough 12'; Hunt 14'; Mills 17'; Barba 18'; Conversions: Copley (0/1), Hunt (0/3), Nikorima (0/1) | [Report Report] | Tries: Mbye 6'; Conversions: Mbye (0/1) | Stadium: Eden Park; Attendance: 43,600; Referee: Luke Phillips |

5:10pm, 15 February

| Sydney Roosters | 14 – 7 | Brisbane Broncos |
|---|---|---|
| Pearce (7), Fittler (5), Friend (2) | Report | Parker (5), Hunt (2) |

Eden Park
Referee: Jared Maxwell

5:35pm, 15 February

| Parramatta Eels | 23 – 6 | Canterbury Bulldogs |
|---|---|---|
| Toutai (5), Ma'u (4), Norman (4), Terepo (4), Radradra (4), Sandow (2) | Report | Perrett (4), Mbye (2) |

Eden Park

12:50pm, 16 February

| Sydney Roosters | 4 – 16 | Canterbury Bulldogs |
|---|---|---|
| Rokolati (4) | Report | O'Hanlon (8), Jackson (4), Graham (4) |

Eden Park

1:15pm, 16 February

| Parramatta Eels | 14 – 15 | Brisbane Broncos |
|---|---|---|
| Norman (7), Radradra (5), Sandow (2) | Report | Nikorima (7), Hoffman (4), Hunt (4) |

Eden Park

=== Blue pool ===
| Pos | Team | Pld | W | D | L | PF | PA | PD | Pts |
|---|---|---|---|---|---|---|---|---|---|
| 1 | Newcastle Knights | 3 | 2 | 0 | 1 | 62 | 29 | +33 | 4 |
| 2 | Cronulla Sharks | 3 | 2 | 0 | 1 | 60 | 47 | +13 | 4 |
| 3 | Gold Coast Titans | 3 | 1 | 0 | 2 | 50 | 62 | −12 | 2 |
| 4 | Wests Tigers | 3 | 1 | 0 | 2 | 28 | 62 | −34 | 2 |

| 15 February 2014 | Cronulla Sharks | 15 – 12 | Newcastle Knights | Auckland, New Zealand |
| 12:35 NZDT | Bonus point tries: Tagataese 7' c Tries: Carney 11'; Gardner 18'; Conversions: Holdsworth (1/3) | [Report Report] | Tries: Roberts 5' c Leilua 13' c Conversions: Mullen (2/2) | Stadium: Eden Park; Attendance: 43,600; Referee: Ben Cummins |

| 15 February 2014 | Wests Tigers | 7 – 22 | Gold Coast Titans | Auckland, New Zealand |
| 13:00 NZDT | Bonus point tries: Tedesco 11' c Conversions: Richards (1/1) | [Report Report] | Tries: Gordon 4'; Carter 6'; Mead 7'; Likiliki 14' c Faifai Loa 15'; Conversions: Kelly (1/3); Bird (0/1); Takairangi (0/1) | Stadium: Eden Park; Attendance: 43,600; Referee: Gavin Reynolds |

4:20pm, 15 February

| Cronulla Sharks | 15 – 21 | Wests Tigers |
|---|---|---|
| Tagataese (5), Feki (4), Leutele (4), Carney (2) | Report | Richards (8), Tedesco (5), Woods (4), Koroibete (4) |

Eden Park

4:45pm, 15 February

| Newcastle Knights | 25 – 14 | Gold Coast Titans |
|---|---|---|
| Leilua (12), Smith (5), Mullen (4), Mamo (4) | Report | Tighe (10), Gordon (2), Kelly (2) |

Eden Park

12:00pm, 16 February

| Cronulla Sharks | 30 – 14 | Gold Coast Titans |
|---|---|---|
| Holdsworth (6), Tagataese (4), Brown (4), Ayshford (4), Holmes (4), Leutele (4), Matt Prior (4) | Report | Minichiello (8), Kelly (6) |

Eden Park

12:25pm, 16 February

| Newcastle Knights | 25 – 0 | Wests Tigers |
|---|---|---|
| Houston (5), Mamo (4), Roberts (4), Mason (4), Gagai (4), Mullen (4) | Report |

Eden Park

=== Red pool ===
| Pos | Team | Pld | W | D | L | PF | PA | PD | Pts |
|---|---|---|---|---|---|---|---|---|---|
| 1 | Penrith Panthers | 3 | 2 | 0 | 1 | 53 | 37 | +16 | 4 |
| 2 | South Sydney Rabbitohs | 3 | 2 | 0 | 1 | 53 | 38 | +15 | 4 |
| 3 | Melbourne Storm | 3 | 1 | 0 | 2 | 39 | 40 | −1 | 2 |
| 4 | St. George Illawarra Dragons | 3 | 1 | 0 | 2 | 26 | 56 | −30 | 2 |

3:15pm, 15 February

| Melbourne Storm | 11 – 14 | Penrith Panthers |
|---|---|---|
| Munster (7), Chambers (4) | Report | Nabuli (4), Mansour (4), Yeo (4), Moylan (2) |

Eden Park

3:40pm, 15 February

| South Sydney Rabbitohs | 23 – 4 | St George Illawarra Dragons |
|---|---|---|
| Reddy (7), Johnston (4), McQueen (4), Tuqiri (4), Keary (4) | Report | Morris (4) |

Eden Park

7:00pm, 15 February

| Melbourne Storm | 18 – 12 | South Sydney Rabbitohs |
|---|---|---|
| Chambers (9), Fonua (5), Waqa (4) | Report | Merritt (4), Reddy (4), Champion (4) |

Eden Park

7:25pm, 15 February

| Penrith Panthers | 23 – 8 | St George Illawarra Dragons |
|---|---|---|
| Nabuli (9), Jennings (8), Soward (6) | Report | Morris (4), Nightingale (4) |

Eden Park

2:35pm, 16 February

| Melbourne Storm | 10 – 14 | St George Illawarra Dragons |
|---|---|---|
| Garbutt (4), Fonua (4), Waqa (2) | Report | Morris (8), Dugan (6) |

Eden Park
Referee: Gavin Badger

3:00pm, 16 February

| Penrith Panthers | 16 – 18 | South Sydney Rabbitohs |
|---|---|---|
| Kingston (4), Campbell-Gillard (4), Mansour (4), Moylan (2), Soward (2) | Report | Koroisau (6), McQueen (4), Te'o (4), Walker (4) |

Eden Park

=== Finals ===
Quarter-Finals
Newcastle Knights | 11
Brisbane Broncos | 16
Parramatta Eels | 6
Cronulla Sharks | 17
New Zealand Warriors | 17
South Sydney Rabbitohs | 16
Penrith Panthers | 12
North Queensland Cowboys | 22

Semi-Finals
Brisbane Broncos | 18
Cronulla Sharks | 14
New Zealand Warriors | 0
North Queensland Cowboys | 8

Final
Brisbane Broncos | 7
North Queensland Cowboys | 16

3:30pm, 16 February

| Newcastle Knights | 11 – 16 | Brisbane Broncos |
|---|---|---|
| McKinnon (5), Mullen (4), Roberts (2) | Report | McCullough (4), Nikorima (4), Hoffman (4), Copley (4) |

Eden Park

3:55pm, 16 February

| Parramatta Eels | 6 – 17 | Cronulla Sharks |
|---|---|---|
| Paulo (6) | Report | Stapleton (6), Holmes (5), Gardner (4), Holdsworth (2) |

Eden Park

4:20pm, 16 February

| New Zealand Warriors | 17 – 16 | South Sydney Rabbitohs |
|---|---|---|
| Johnson (7), Fisiiahi (4), Laumape (4), Tomkins (2) | Report | Walker (6), McQueen (4), Merritt (4), Koroisau (2) |

Eden Park

4:45pm, 16 February

| Penrith Panthers | 12 – 22 | North Queensland Cowboys |
|---|---|---|
| Nabuli (4), Jennings (4), Mansour (4) | Report | Feldt (10), Sims (4), Rona (4), Morgan (4) |

Eden Park

5:45pm, 16 February

| Brisbane Broncos | 18 – 14 | Cronulla Sharks |
|---|---|---|
| McCullough (4), Barba (4), Hunt (4), Hoffman (4), Gillett (2) | Report | Feki (5), Wright (5), Holdsworth (4) |

Eden Park
Referee: Gerard Sutton

6:10pm, 16 February

| New Zealand Warriors | 0 – 8 | North Queensland Cowboys |
|---|---|---|
| | Report | Feldt (4), Bowen (4) |

Eden Park
Referee: Ben Cummins

7:30pm, 16 February

| Brisbane Broncos | 7 – 16 | North Queensland Cowboys |
|---|---|---|
| Hunt (7) | Report | Rona (8), Winterstein (4), Lui (2), Morgan (2) |

Eden Park
Referee: Ben Cummins

== Players ==
=== Team of the Tournament ===
| Player | Club |
|---|---|
| Andrew McCullough | Brisbane Broncos |
| Shaun Johnson | New Zealand Warriors |
| James Tamou | North Queensland Cowboys |
| Dylan Walker | South Sydney Rabbitohs |
| Antonio Winterstein | North Queensland Cowboys |
| Andrew Fifita | Cronulla-Sutherland Sharks |
| Kane Linnett | North Queensland Cowboys |
| Gavin Cooper | North Queensland Cowboys |
| Suaia Matagi | New Zealand Warriors |

=== Brisbane Broncos ===
Player
Ben Barba
Josh Hoffman
Dale Copley
Alex Glenn
Stewart Mills
Kodi Nikorima
Ben Hunt
Martin Kennedy
Andrew McCullough
Sam Thaiday
Matt Gillett
Jordan Drew
Corey Parker (C)
David Stagg
Todd Lowrie
Jake Granville
Joe Ofahengaue

=== Canberra Raiders ===
Player
Jarrod Croker (C)
Reece Robinson
Mitch Cornish
Bill Tupou
Matt McIlwrick
Joel Edwards
Glen Buttriss
Tom Learoyd-Lahrs
Jarrad Kennedy
Mark Nicholls
Jake Foster
Lagi Setu
Mitch Cronin
Luke Bateman
Jack Ahearn
Andrew Heffernan

=== Canterbury-Bankstown Bulldogs ===
Player
Sam Perrett
Mitch Brown
Chase Stanley
Tyrone Phillips
Ed Murphy
Moses Mbye
Drury Low
Tim Browne
Michael Ennis (C)
Dale Finucane
Josh Jackson
Tony Williams
Pat O'Hanlon
Lachlan Burr
Corey Thompson
Lloyd Perrett
Jaline Graham

=== Cronulla-Sutherland Sharks ===
Player
Nathan Gardner
Nathan Stapleton
Blake Ayshford
Jonathan Wright
Sosaia Feki
Todd Carney
Daniel Holdsworth
Andrew Fifita
Michael Lichaa
Sam Tagataese
Wade Graham
Matt Prior
Paul Gallen
Ricky Leutele
Tupou Sopoaga
Fa'amanu Brown

=== Gold Coast Titans ===
Player
William Zillman
Brad Tighe
David Mead
Kevin Gordon
Albert Kelly
Greg Bird
Ashley Harrison
Anthony Don
Paul Carter
Kalifa Faifai Loa
Brad Takairangi
Mark Minichiello
Maurice Blair
Luke Bailey
Siuatonga Likiliki
David Taylor

=== Manly-Warringah Sea Eagles ===
Player
Cheyse Blair
Jamie Buhrer
Michael Chee-Kam
Daly Cherry-Evans
Clinton Gutherson
James Hasson
Peta Hiku
Justin Horo
Jack Littlejohn
Steve Menzies
Ligi Sao
Tony Satini
Jesse Sene-Lefao
Tom Symonds
Jorge Taufua
David Williams

=== Melbourne Storm ===
Player
Will Chambers
Sisa Waqa
Joel Romelo
Mahe Fonua
Matt Duffie
Young Tonumaipea
Mitch Garbutt
Justin O'Neill
Tohu Harris
Matthew Lodge
Kevin Proctor
Ryan Hoffman (C)
Slade Griffin
Kurt Mann
Cameron Munster
Richie Kennar

=== Newcastle Knights ===
Player
Jarrod Mullen (C)
Adam Cuthbertson
Jake Mamo
Dane Gagai
Joseph Leilua
Akuila Uate
Tyrone Roberts
Willie Mason
Adam Clydsdale
Chris Houston
Beau Scott
Robbie Rochow
Jeremy Smith
Michael Dobson
Alex McKinnon
Zane Tetevano

=== North Queensland Cowboys ===
Player
Lachlan Coote
Zac Santo
Antonio Winterstein
Kane Linnett
Javid Bowen
Michael Morgan
Robert Lui
Jason Taumalolo
Ray Thompson
James Tamou
Gavin Cooper (c)
Tariq Sims
Joel Riethmuller
Rory Kostjasyn
Kyle Feldt
Curtis Rona

=== Parramatta Eels ===
Player
Willie Tonga (C)
Kenny Edwards
Bureta Faraimo
John Folau
Manu Ma'u
Fuifui Moimoi
Ryan Morgan
Corey Norman
Pauli Pauli
Joseph Paulo
Nathan Peats
Api Pewhairangi
Semi Radradra
Chris Sandow
Ken Sio
Peni Terepo
Vai Toutai

=== Penrith Panthers ===
Player
Matt Moylan
Wes Naiqama
Josh Mansour
Isaac John
Kevin Naiqama
Jamie Soward
Jeremy Latimore
Sam McKendry
Kevin Kingston
Tyrone Peachey
Lewis Brown
Adam Docker
Reagan Campbell-Gillard
Eto Nabuli
George Jennings
Isaah Yeo

=== South Sydney Rabbitohs ===
Player
Nathan Merritt
Beau Champion
Alex Johnston
Joel Reddy
Dylan Walker
Luke Keary
Apisai Koroisau
Dave Tyrrell
Irae Simone
Ben Lowe
Chris McQueen
Ben Te'o (C)
John Sutton
Cameron McInnes
Kyle Turner
Lote Tuqiri

=== St. George Illawarra Dragons ===
Player
Josh Dugan
Brett Morris (C)
Dylan Farrell
Nathan Green
Jason Nightingale
Adam Quinlan
Sam Williams
Jack de Belin
Mitch Rein
Tyson Frizell
Leeson Ah Mau
Joel Thompson
Trent Merrin
Bronson Harrison
Michael Witt
Craig Garvey

=== Sydney Roosters ===
Player
Mitchell Pearce (C)
Jake Friend (C)
Shaun Kenny-Dowall
Aidan Guerra
Kane Evans
Daniel Tupou
Samisoni Langi
Jackson Hastings
Dylan Napa
Isaac Liu
Nene Macdonald
Jonathon Reuben
Paul Rokolati
Rhyse Martin
Saulala Houma
Sio Siua Taukeiaho
Brad Fittler

=== New Zealand Warriors ===
Player
Jason Bukuya
Raymond Faitala-Mariner
Glen Fisiiahi
David Fusitua
Charlie Gubb
Konrad Hurrell
Sebastine Ikahihifo
Shaun Johnson
Solomone Kata
Ngani Laumape
Tuimoala Lolohea
Sione Lousi
Suaia Matagi
Dominique Peyroux
Sam Tomkins
Carlos Tuimavave

=== Wests Tigers ===
Player
James Tedesco
Pat Richards
Bodene Thompson
Marika Koroibete
Mitchell Moses
Blake Austin
Aaron Woods
Robbie Farah (C)
Martin Taupau
Cory Paterson
Curtis Sironen
Adam Blair
Manaia Cherrington
Kurtis Rowe
James Gavet
Ben Murdoch-Masila
Delouise Hoeter

=== Jillaroos ===
Player
Steph Hancock (C)
Sam Hammond
Karina Brown
Jenni-Sue Hoepper
Annette Brander
Deanna Turner
Ali Brigginshaw
Maddie Studdon
Brittany Breayley
Heather Ballinger
Kezie Apps
Vanessa Foliaki
Ruan Sims
Julie Young
Kellye Hodges
Nikki Richards

=== Kiwi Ferns ===
Player
Sarina Fiso (C)
Maitua Feterika
Teuila Fotu-Moala
Georgia Hale
Chanel Huddleston
Nora Maaka
Kelly Maipi
Laura Mariu
Krystal Murray
Hilda Peters
Kahurangi Peters
Rona Peters
Krystal Rota
Atawhai Tupaea
Janna Vaughan
Sharnita Woodman
