= Andrew Heffernan (rugby league) =

Australian rugby league footballer

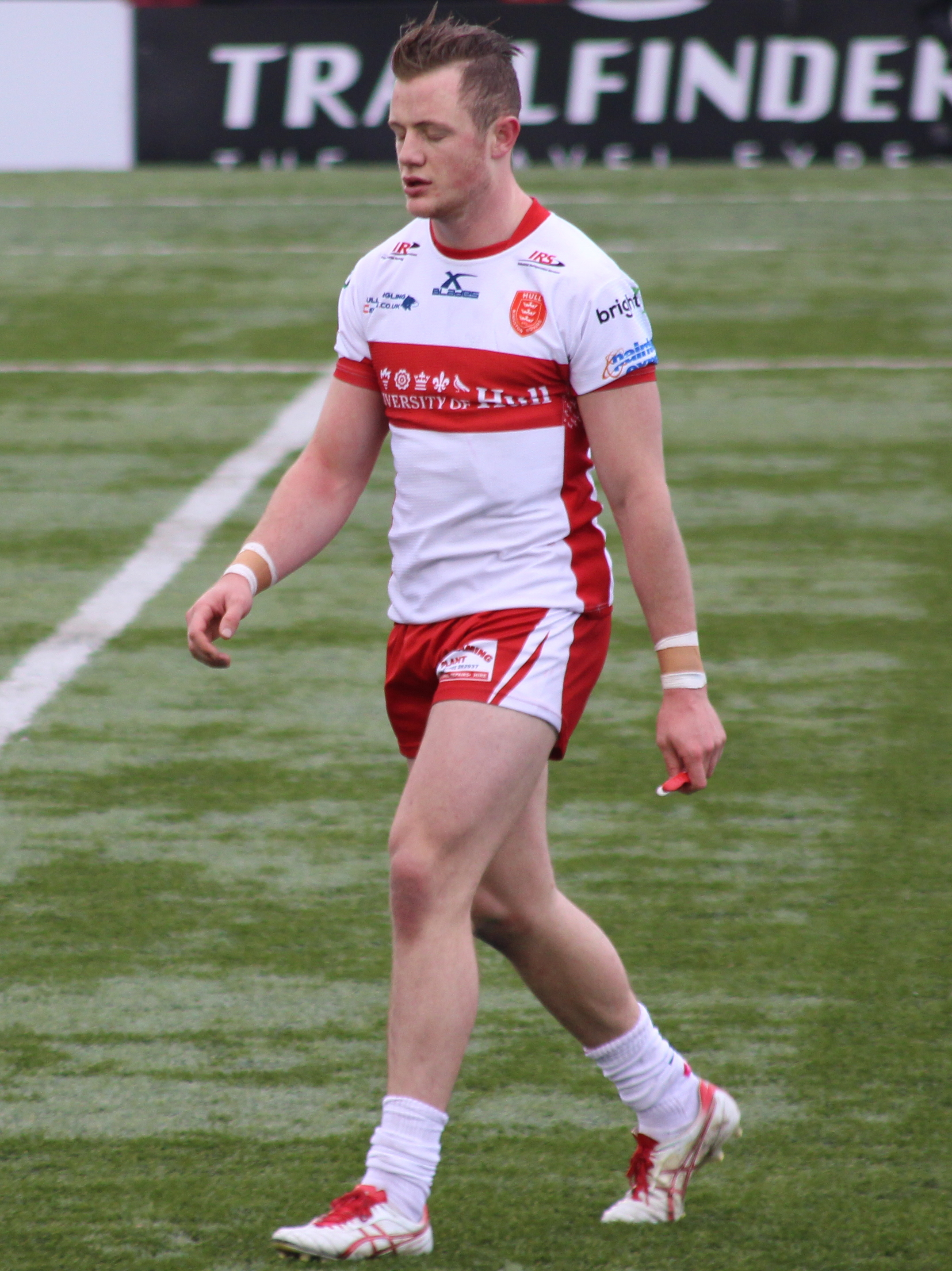

Personal information
- Full name: Andrew Heffernan
- Born: 24 January 1995 (age 31) Wagga Wagga, New South Wales, Australia
- Height: 182 cm (6 ft 0 in)
- Weight: 95 kg (14 st 13 lb)

Playing information
- Position: Centre, Wing, Fullback
Club
Years	Team	Pld	T	G	FG	P
2017–18	Hull Kingston Rovers	31	20	0	0	80
- Source: As of 1 June 2019

Andrew Heffernan (born 24 January 1995) is an Australian professional rugby league footballer who most recently played as a centre for Hull Kingston Rovers in the Super League.

== Background ==
Heffernan was born in Wagga Wagga, New South Wales, Australia. He grew up on a sheep, wheat, and canola farm in Junee, New South Wales.

He played first-grade rugby league as a 17-year-old, with Group Nine Club Southcity in 2012.

== Senior career ==
=== Canberra Raiders ===
Heffernan was in the Canberra Raiders' system and played in the under-20's competition.

In 2014, he was named in Canberra's 2014 NRL Auckland Nines squad. He scored a try against the New Zealand Warriors on the inaugural day of the tournament. He played for the Canberra Raiders side against the Melbourne Storm in a trial game in 2014.

=== Penrith Panthers ===
At the end of the 2015 season, Heffernan left Canberra to join Penrith. He was named in the Panthers' summer training squad and secured a spot in their 2016 NRL squad.

He played for Penrith in the Intrust Super Premiership.

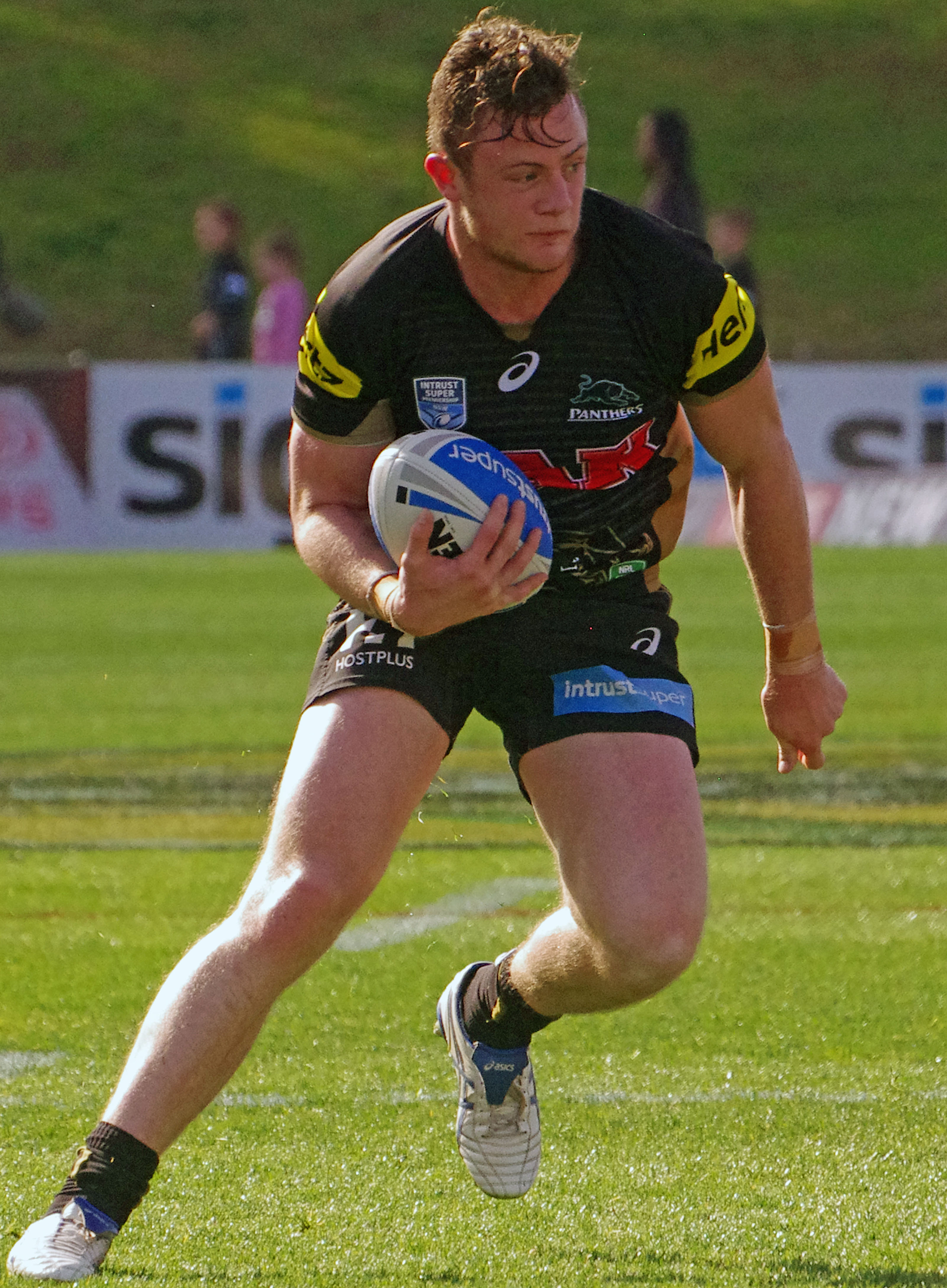
Heffernan playing for the Panthers during his time at the club

=== Hull Kingston Rovers (2017-18) ===
==== 2017 ====
Heffernan joined Hull Kingston Rovers from Penrith ahead of the 2017 season.

In February 2017, Heffernan made his professional début in England for Hull Kingston Rovers, scoring two tries in a 54-24 victory over the Bradford Bulls, on the opening day of the 2017 Championship season at Craven Park. He repeated this feat at the 2017 Summer Bash, by scoring twice in Hull Kingston Rovers 20-19 victory over Bradford. He was one of Tim Sheens' standout signings throughout the regular season, churning out some impressive displays in both attack and defence. This included a total of 17 tries in 20 games. Heffernan finished his début professional campaign with a total of 18 tries in 24 games. He was a vital-part both offensively and defensively in helping Hull Kingston Rovers earn promotion back to the Super League, at their first attempt of asking following relegation the season prior.

==== 2018 ====
In the 2018 Super League season, the 23-year-old centre suffered multiple concussion injuries and he was stood-down for the remainder of the year on medical advice. Heffernan last featured on 7 April 2018, when scoring in a 31-12 home victory over the Widnes Vikings. He had just seven appearances to his name before his campaign was cut-short. In light of Heffernan's situation, Hull Kingston Rovers Head Coach Tim Sheens gave his opinion on the matter.

“It's not a cruciate ligament injury for example and he'll be back in an x-amount of weeks. It's an injury which is really starting to surface a lot over the last few years.

“To consider when a player can and can't play with these types of injuries is out of our hands. It is neurosurgeons which make those decisions.

“We have had him go down to London to see specialists and have scans. The specialist said, in three-months time we'll talk again.”

Heffernan was released from his contract at Hull Kingston Rovers on 22 August 2018, due to his long-standing concussion injury that he sustained earlier during the 2018 Super League season. This was at the player's own request, so he could return to Australia for further recuperation and treatment.

== Representative career ==
Heffernan is eligible to represent Malta though his Maltese heritage.

He was unable to represent Malta in the 2017 Rugby League World Cup Qualifiers after he was ruled out for the season following surgery on his shoulder.

== Outside rugby league ==
Hefferman obtained a Bachelor of Sport and Exercise Science at University of Canberra in 2013.

It was revealed on 12 September 2018, that Heffernan had found a new avenue of interest by becoming rugby league club manager at Muddy Boot Sports, back home in his native Australia. The appointment came after Heffernan was forced to take an extended break from rugby league as a player, following multiple concussion injuries that he sustained during the 2018 Super League season whilst he was playing at Hull Kingston Rovers.
