= Vai Toutai =

Tonga international rugby league footballer

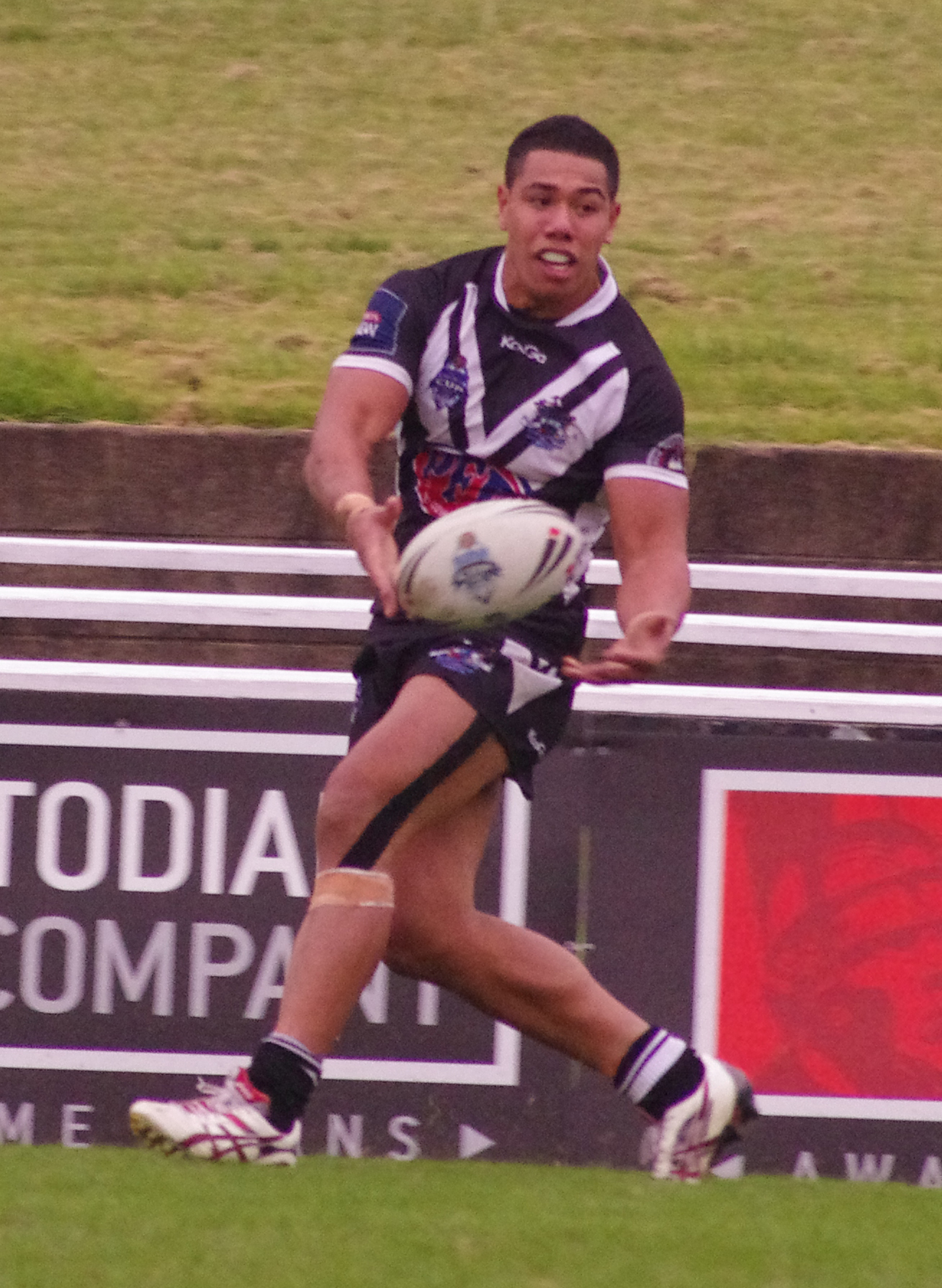
- Toutai playing for the Wentworthville Magpies in 2012.

Personal information
- Full name: Vai Afu Toutai
- Born: 28 January 1993 (age 33) Campbelltown, New South Wales, Australia

Playing information
- Height: 186 cm (6 ft 1 in)
- Weight: 103 kg (16 st 3 lb)
- Position: Wing, Centre
Club
Years	Team	Pld	T	G	FG	P
2013–16	Parramatta Eels	33	15	0	0	60
Representative
Years	Team	Pld	T	G	FG	P
2014–16	Tonga	2	0	0	0	0

Vai Toutai (born 28 January 1993) is a former professional Tonga international rugby league footballer who last played as a centre and on the wing for the Blacktown Workers Sea Eagles in the Intrust Super Premiership NSW.

== Background ==
Born in Campbelltown, New South Wales, Toutai is of Tongan descent and attended Eagle Vale High School. He played his junior rugby league for Campbelltown City Kangaroos and Fairfield United before being signed by the Parramatta Eels.

== Playing career ==
=== 2013 ===
Toutai played for Parramatta's NYC team in 2011 and 2012, scoring 12 tries in 29 games. In round 2 of the 2013 NRL season, Toutai made his NRL debut for the Eels against the Canterbury-Bankstown Bulldogs, replacing injured winger Ken Sio in the Eels 20–16 loss at ANZ Stadium. In his next match in round 3 against the Wests Tigers, Toutai scored his NRL first try in the Eels 31–18 loss at Leichhardt Oval. Toutai finished off his debut year with him playing in 15 matches and scoring 4 tries (16p) as the club finished last on the table for a second consecutive year.

=== 2014 ===
On 14 February 2014, Toutai was selected in the Eels inaugural 2014 NRL Auckland Nines squad. In round 1 against the New Zealand Warriors, Toutai scored a hat-trick in the Eels 36–16 win at Parramatta Stadium. On 5 June 2014, Toutai extended his contract with the Eels for a further 3 years till the end of the 2017 NRL season. On 19 July 2014, Toutai dropped the ball over the line twice in a 32–12 defeat by South Sydney. In round 23 against the Canterbury-Bankstown Bulldogs at ANZ Stadium, Toutai was the centre of the Eels controversial 18–16 loss after Toutai received a pass from the Eels ball boy after halfback Chris Sandow kicked a 40/20 then Toutai passing the ball to Sandow to race over to score the winning try for the Eels but was disallowed after the ball boy didn't place the ball on the ground. Toutai finished off the Eels 2014 season having played in 10 matches and scoring 8 tries. On 16 October 2014, he was named in the Tonga squad to play against the Papua New Guinea national rugby league team in Lae. He played on the wing in Tonga's 32–18 loss.

=== 2015 ===
Toutai appeared in two matches for the Parramatta club in the 2015 season.

=== 2016 ===
On 1 February, Toutai was named in the Eels' 2016 NRL Auckland Nines squad. On 7 May, he played for Tonga against Samoa in the 2016 Polynesian Cup. In December 2016, Toutai's contract with Parramatta was terminated after it was revealed he was involved in a brawl with Outlaw Bikie member in which he glassed them with a bottle. The Bikie reportedly vowed to exact revenge on Toutai.

=== 2018 ===
After a year out of the game, Toutai signed a contract to join Intrust Super Premiership NSW side the Blacktown Workers Sea Eagles.
