= Peni Terepo =

Tonga international rugby league footballer

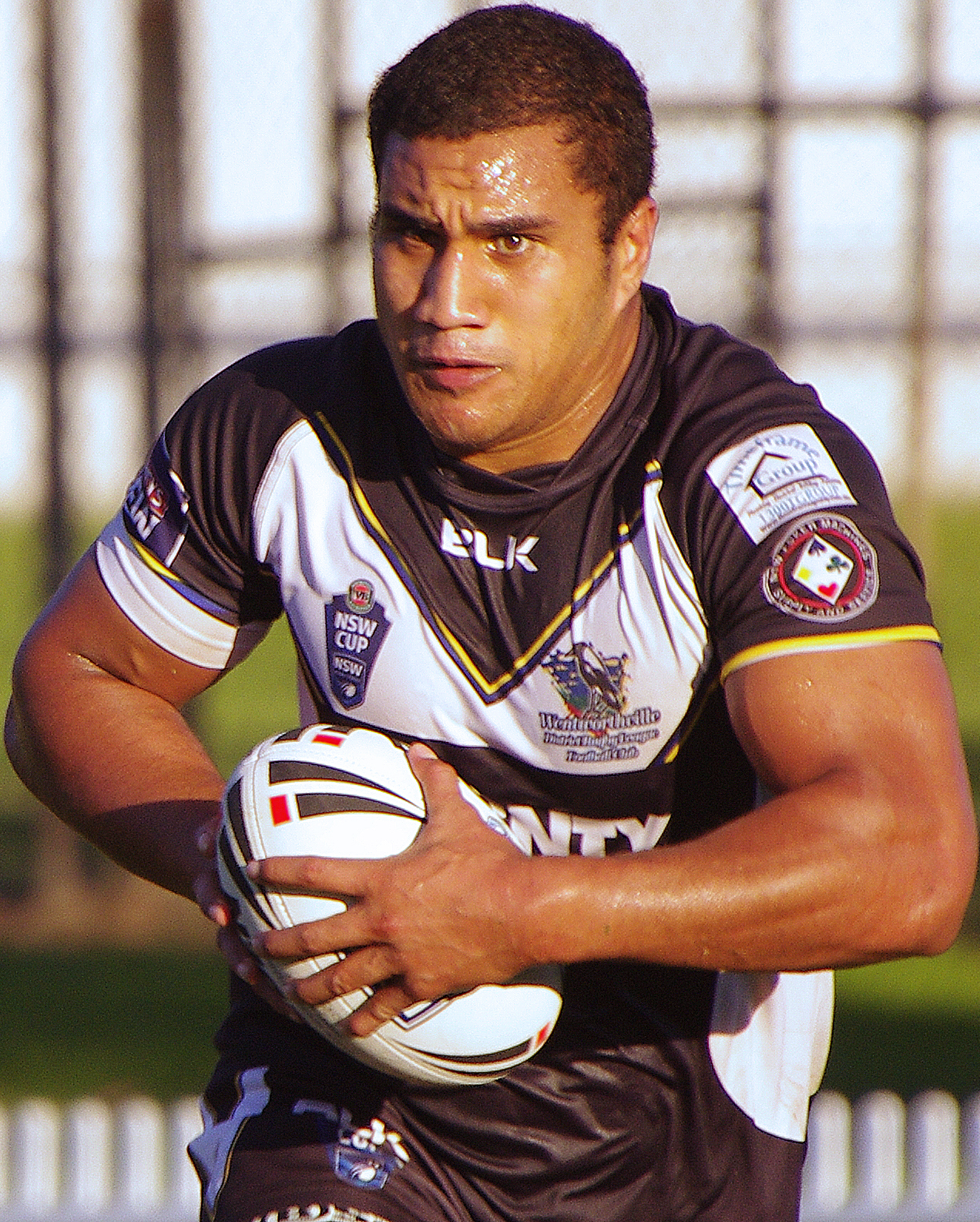

Personal information
- Born: 21 November 1991 (age 35) Auckland, New Zealand
- Height: 186 cm (6 ft 1 in)
- Weight: 108 kg (17 st 0 lb)

Playing information
- Position: Prop, Lock
Club
Years	Team	Pld	T	G	FG	P
2013–20	Parramatta Eels	123	6	0	0	24
Representative
Years	Team	Pld	T	G	FG	P
2013–19	Tonga	10	4	0	0	16
- Source: As of 12 July 2020

Peni Terepo (born 21 November 1991) is a Tonga former international rugby league footballer who played as a prop, second-row and lock for the Parramatta Eels in the NRL.

== Background ==
Terepo was born in Auckland, New Zealand, and is of Cook Islands and Tongan descent.

Terepo played his junior football for the Mangere East Hawks before being signed by the Parramatta Eels.

== Playing career ==
Terepo played for Parramatta's NYC team between 2009 and 2011. On 19 August 2011, Terepo re-signed with Parramatta on a two-year contract. At the end of 2011, Terepo won the Eels NYC Player's Player award.

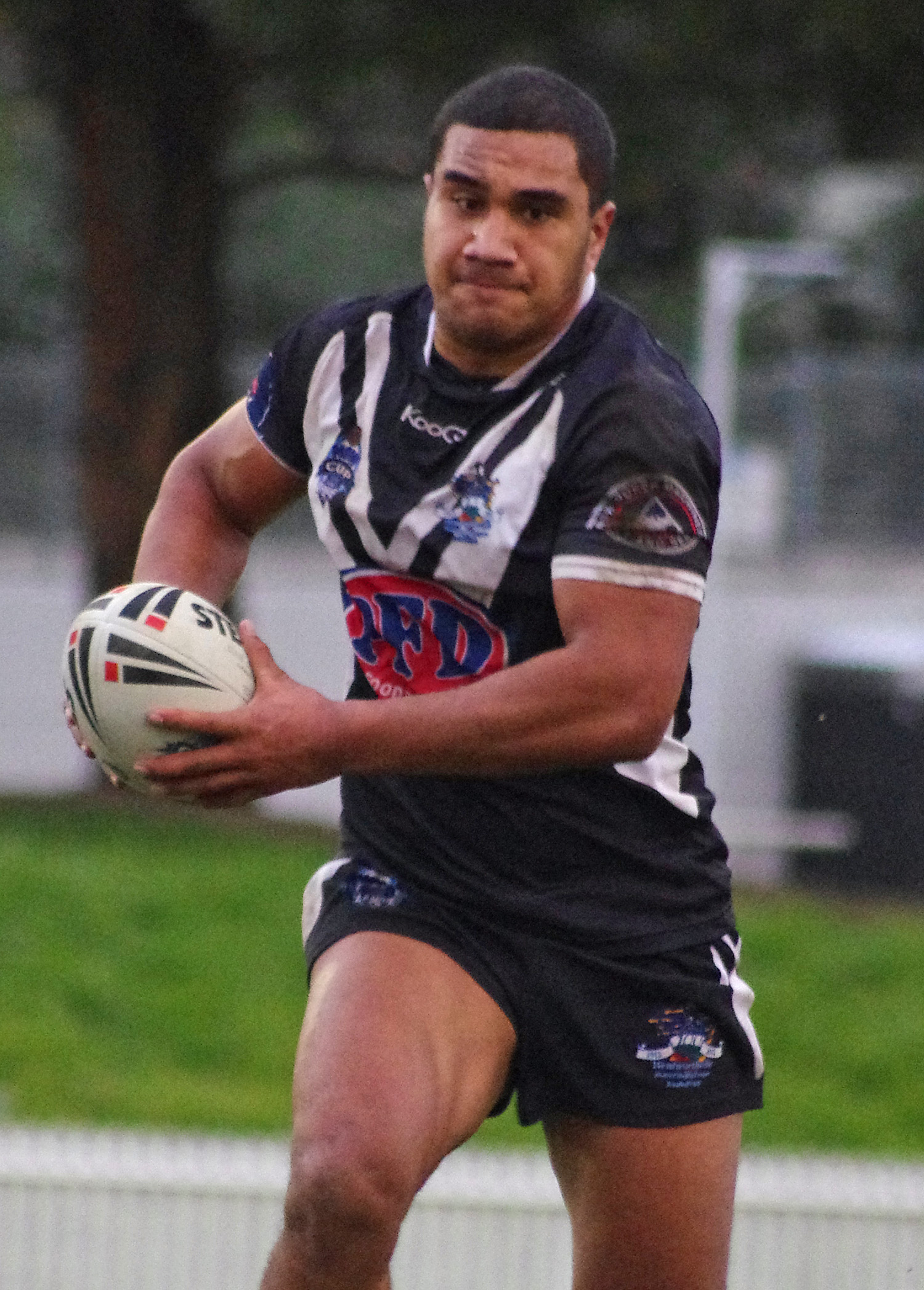
Terepo playing for the Wentworthville Magpies

=== 2013 ===
In round 8 of the 2013 NRL season, Terepo made his NRL debut for the Parramatta Eels against the North Queensland Cowboys at lock in the Eels 10–14 loss at Parramatta Stadium. In round 10, against the St George Illawarra Dragons, Terepo scored his first and second try NRL career tries in Parramatta's 12–32 loss at WIN Stadium. On 5 July 2013, Terepo extended his contract with the Parramatta club for a further two years until the end of the 2015 season. Terepo finished his debut year in the NRL with him playing in 17 matches and scoring four tries for the Parramatta Eels in the season. Terepo was included in the Tongan squad for the 2013 Rugby League World Cup, playing in one match and scoring a try against Italy in the 16–0 win at The Shay.

=== 2014 ===
In February 2014, Terepo was selected in Parramatta's inaugural 2014 Auckland Nines squad. Terepo finished off the 2014 NRL season with him playing in 21 matches and scoring a try for Parramatta.

=== 2015 ===
On 31 January and 1 February, Terepo played for the Eels in the 2015 NRL Auckland Nines. On 2 May, he represented Tonga in their 2015 Polynesian Cup test-match against Pacific rivals Samoa, playing at prop in Tonga's 16–18 loss at Cbus Super Stadium. He finished off the 2015 season having played in 13 matches for the Eels. On 17 October, he played for Tonga in their Asia-Pacific Qualifier against the Cook Islands for the 2017 Rugby League World Cup, playing at prop and scoring a try in Tonga's 28–8 win at Campbelltown Stadium.

=== 2016 ===
In February 2016, Terepo played in Parramatta's tournament winning 2016 NRL Auckland Nines campaign. This title was later stripped by the NRL for salary cap breaches. On 7 May 2016, Terepo played for Tonga against Samoa in the 2016 Polynesian Cup, starting at prop in the 18–6 loss at Parramatta Stadium. Terepo finished the 2016 NRL season having played in 23 matches for the Eels. On 8 December 2016, Terepo made his professional boxing debut in the Ladbrokes Charity Fight Night where he went against David Tuliloa but lost in the second round.

=== 2017 ===
On 27 January 2017, Terepo was stood down from the club for a number of weeks after he pleaded guilty to careless driving and also refused to give a blood alcohol test after he crashed in Auckland. Terepo was later fined $500 and $130 in court costs as well being disqualified from driving for seven months, Terepo was almost sacked from the club for not reporting the incident but instead was fined $15,000 for the club. Terepo made his return to Parramatta's first grade squad in round 6 against the New Zealand Warriors, coming off the interchange bench in the 10–22 loss at Mt Smart Stadium.

=== 2018 ===
Terepo made 20 appearances for Parramatta in a difficult 2018 season where the club finished last on the table and claimed its 14th wooden spoon. On 30 October 2018, Terepo signed a one-year contract extension to remain at the club until the end of the 2019 season.

=== 2019 ===
On 11 March, Terepo was stood down by Parramatta for allegedly abusing Air New Zealand staff in an alcohol-fuelled incident on a flight from Tonga to Auckland. Terepo was allegedly upset that he had brought his own alcohol onto the flight but was not allowed to drink it from his coffee cup.

Terepo was told by the flight manager to stop drinking his own alcohol on the plane but continued to do so. Terepo was also seen by staff acting inappropriately towards a female flight attendant. Once the flight arrived in Auckland, Terepo was escorted off the plane by police.

Parramatta released a statement saying "The club has stood Peni down immediately, including this week's Round 1 game against Penrith. The club will now work with the relevant authorities in New Zealand, the NRL Integrity Unit and the RLPA to investigate the incident thoroughly. This process will then guide our next steps. The club will make no further comment until the investigation is completed".

On 25 March, Terepo avoided having his contract terminated by Parramatta but was fined $25,000 in relation to his alcohol-fueled incident which happened earlier in the month.

Terepo made a total of 16 appearances for Parramatta in the 2019 NRL season. Terepo played for the club's feeder side the Wentworthville Magpies in their Canterbury Cup NSW grand final defeat against Newtown at Bankwest Stadium.

=== 2020 ===
In round 2 of the 2020 NRL season, Terepo scored his first try in six years as Parramatta defeated the Gold Coast 46–6.

Terepo played a total of six games for Parramatta in the 2020 NRL season. On 12 October, he was released by the club after not securing a new contract. He left Parramatta as one of their longest serving players in the NRL era.

== Post playing ==
After his retirement from the NRL, Terepo revealed he had begun a new career as a butcher and also revealed that his decision to retire from rugby league was due to his epilepsy becoming worse. In January 2024, Terepo had signed to play with the Macquarie Rugby League side for the 2024 season.

== Statistics ==
Year	Team	Games	Tries	Pts
2013	Parramatta Eels	17	4	16
2014	Parramatta Eels	21	1	4
2015	Parramatta Eels	13		
2016	Parramatta Eels	23		
2017	Parramatta Eels	7		
2018	Parramatta Eels	20		
2019	Parramatta Eels	16		
2020	Parramatta Eels	6	1	4
	Totals	123	6	24
