= Stewart Mills =

Australian rugby league footballer

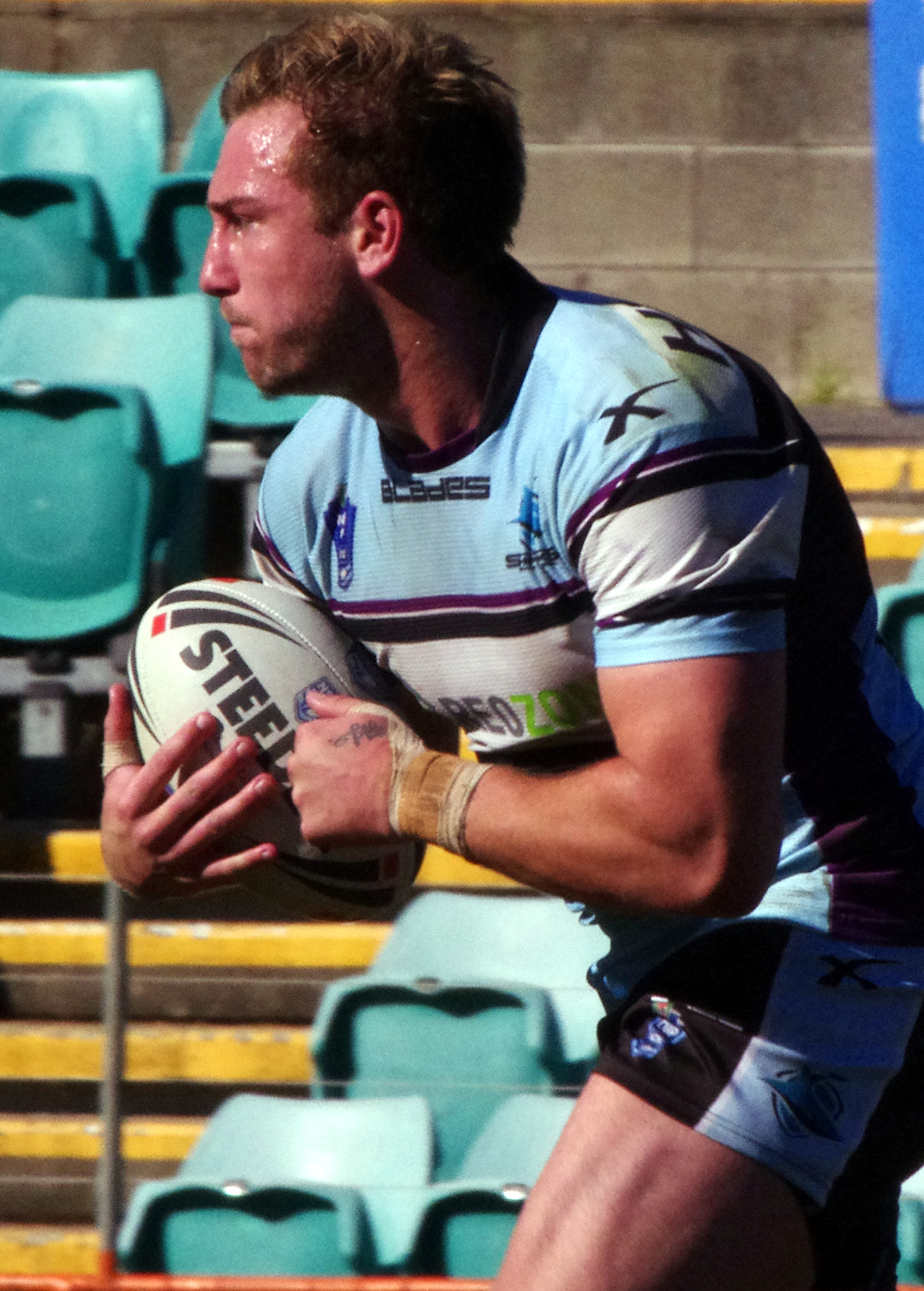

Personal information
- Full name: Stewart Mills
- Born: 12 November 1991 (age 35) Sydney, New South Wales, Australia

Playing information
- Height: 188 cm (6 ft 2 in)
- Weight: 95 kg (14 st 13 lb)
- Position: Wing, Centre, Fullback
Club
Years	Team	Pld	T	G	FG	P
2011–13	Cronulla Sharks	16	6	0	0	24

Stewart Mills is an Australian former rugby league footballer who played as a wing, centre and fullback for the Cronulla-Sutherland Sharks in the NRL. He was contracted to the Brisbane Broncos as part of their National Rugby League squad, but did not feature in the first team.

== Playing career ==
Mills made his NRL debut in round 10 of the 2011 NRL season against the Sydney Roosters, scoring a try in a Cronulla victory. League great Phil Gould described Mills' first game as "one of the toughest and most competent first-grade debuts" he had seen. Mills' career was hindered by injuries over the past two years before his debut.

On 22 September 2013, Mills was named at centre in the 2013 NSW Cup Team of the Year.

On 15 October 2013, Mills signed a one-year contract with the Brisbane Broncos.

In the middle of his contract, Mills quit the Brisbane club to return home and work as an landscaper.

In 2015, Mills joined the Mount Pritchard Mounties in the NSW Cup. In late 2016, he revealed on Instagram that he was retiring due to a chronic knee injury, he is now Captain Coach for the Nyngan Tigers 2017.
