= Cody Nelson =

Australian rugby league footballer

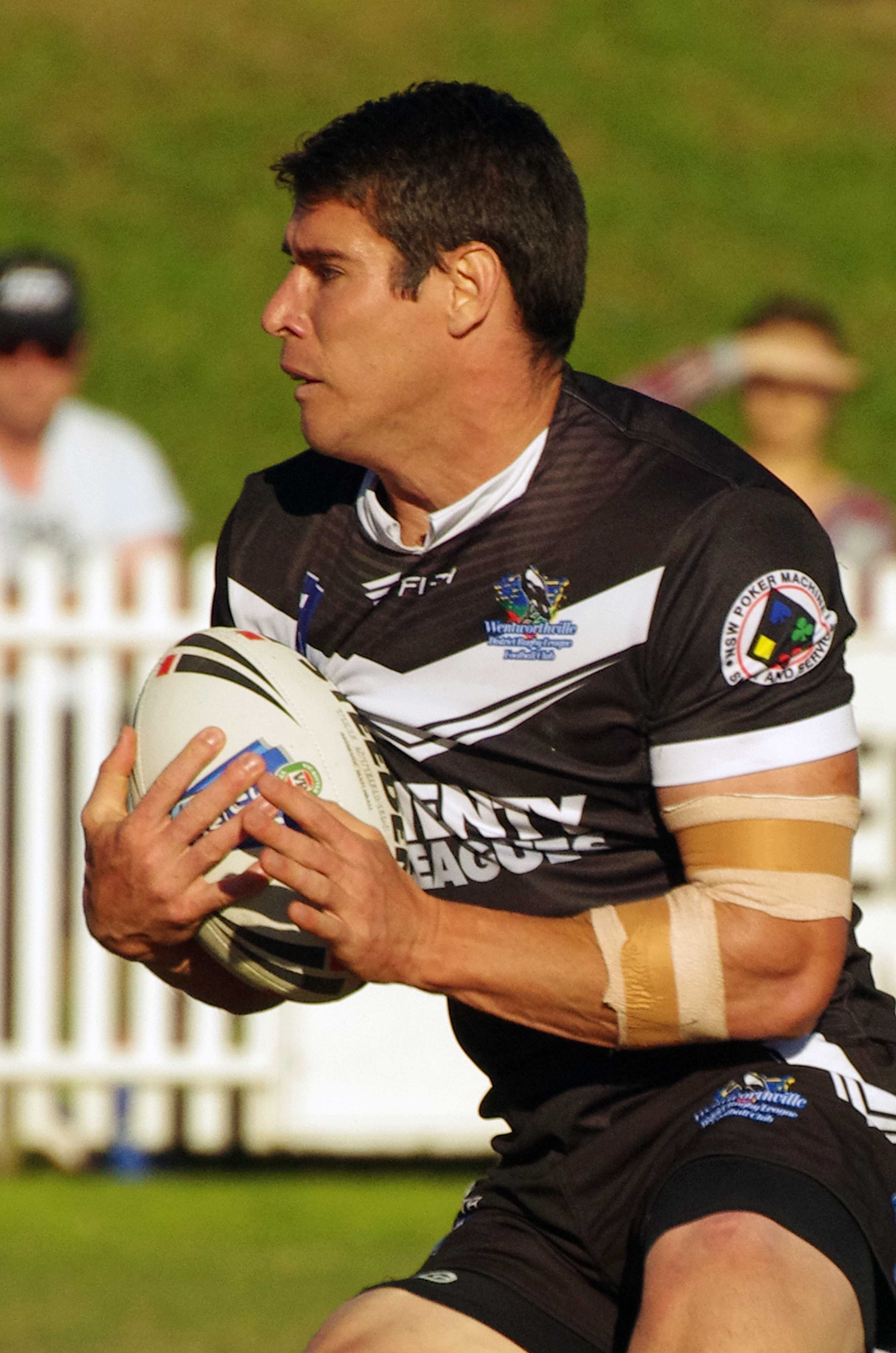
- Nelson playing for the Wentworthville Magpies in 2015

Personal information
- Born: 13 November 1988 (age 38) Mullumbimby, New South Wales, Australia
- Height: 186 cm (6 ft 1 in)
- Weight: 99 kg (15 st 8 lb)

Playing information
- Position: Second-row, Hooker
Club
Years	Team	Pld	T	G	FG	P
2014	Gold Coast Titans	8	0	0	0	0
2015–17	Parramatta Eels	3	0	0	0	0
	Total	11	0	0	0	0
- Source: As of 24 July 2015

Cody Nelson (born 13 November 1988) is an Australian professional rugby league footballer who plays for the Mullumbimby Giants. He primarily plays at second-row, but can also fill in at hooker. He previously played for the Gold Coast Titans and the Parramatta Eels.

== Background ==
Born in Mullumbimby, New South Wales, Nelson played his junior football for the Mullumbimby Giants, before being signed by the Gold Coast Titans.

== Playing career ==
=== Early career ===
In 2008, Nelson played for the Gold Coast Titans' NYC team, before moving on to the Titans' Queensland Cup team, Tweed Heads Seagulls in 2009.

=== 2014 ===
In Round 8 of the 2014 NRL season, Nelson made his NRL debut for the Titans against the Wests Tigers. On 4 September 2014, he signed a 2-year contract with the Parramatta Eels starting in 2015.

=== 2015 ===
In Round 16 of the 2015 NRL season, Nelson made his Eels debut against the St. George Illawarra Dragons.

=== 2018 ===
For the 2018 season, Nelson signed a contract to join Intrust Super Premiership NSW side The Blacktown Workers Sea Eagles.

=== 2022 ===
In 2022, it was revealed that Nelson was playing with his junior club the Mullumbimby Giants.

== Suspension ==
In 2014, Nelson received a two-match suspension from the NRL after being found to have placed bets on NRL matches.
