= Ken Sio =

Australian rugby league footballer (born 1990)

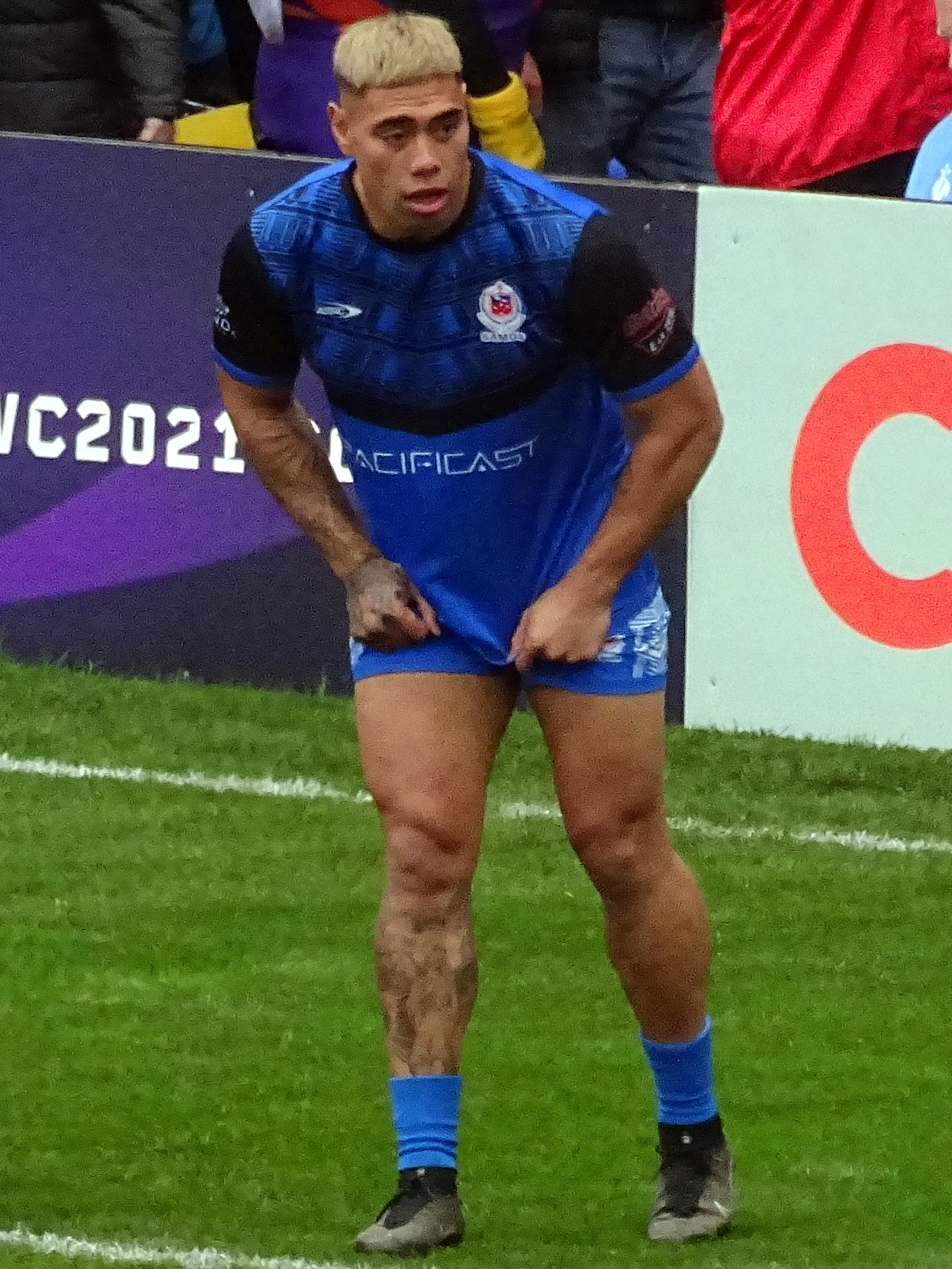

Personal information
- Full name: Ken Sio
- Born: 29 October 1990 (age 36) Blacktown, New South Wales, Australia
- Height: 5 ft 11 in (1.81 m)
- Weight: 14 st 13 lb (95 kg)

Playing information
- Position: Wing
Club
Years	Team	Pld	T	G	FG	P
2011–14	Parramatta Eels	57	37	0	0	148
2015–16	Hull Kingston Rovers	61	36	13	0	170
2017–18	Newcastle Knights	41	17	25	0	118
2019–23	Salford Red Devils	102	78	13	0	330
	Total	261	168	51	0	766
Representative
Years	Team	Pld	T	G	FG	P
2021–22	Combined Nations All Stars	2	3	0	0	12
- Source: As of 5 December 2023

Ken Sio (born 29 October 1990) is a former professional rugby league footballer who last played on the wing for the Salford Red Devils in the Super League.

He has previously played for the Parramatta Eels, the Newcastle Knights in the NRL, and Hull Kingston Rovers in the Super League.

== Background ==
Sio was born in Blacktown, New South Wales, Australia.

== Playing career ==
Having played his junior football for the Wentworthville Magpies, Sio went on and played in the Under 20s Toyota Cup in the 2009 and 2010 seasons for the Parramatta Eels.

Going on to train with the first-grade side before breaking his leg in a trial game in 2011, Sio returned halfway through the season for the Cabramatta Two Blues in the Bundaberg Red Cup.

== Parramatta Eels (2011–14) ==
Sio made his National Rugby League début in round 26 of the 2011 season, he played on the wing against the Gold Coast Titans, also scoring his début try in the same match.

In June 2011, he re-signed with the Parramatta Eels until 2014, along with teammates Matt Ryan and Joseph Paulo respectively.

Sio was seen as the shining light in 2012, which was a terrible season for the Parramatta Eels as they finished last on the table for the first time since 1972, when he scored 13 tries and subsequently came 6th in the NRL's top try scorers table for the season.

He was injured in round 1 of the 2013 season against the Warriors, in which he was replaced by debutant, Vai Toutai. Sio returned from injury to play 20 games for Parramatta in 2013 and scored 10 tries but it was not enough to save Parramatta from a second consecutive wooden spoon.

In the 2014 NRL season, Sio scored 13 tries in 12 games as Parramatta narrowly missed the finals.

== Hull Kingston Rovers (2015-16) ==
On 31 July 2014, Sio signed a contract to play for Super League club Hull Kingston Rovers from 2015.

On 8 February 2015, he made his début for Hull Kingston Rovers in round 1 of the Super League season against the Leeds Rhinos. He then scored his first-ever Super League try against the Wakefield Trinity Wildcats in round 2.

He represented the club in the 2015 Challenge Cup Final.

Sio suffered relegation from the Super League with Hull Kingston Rovers in the 2016 season, due to losing the Million Pound Game by the Salford Red Devils.

That same game proved to be his last appearance for Hull Kingston Rovers, as he went onto join the Newcastle Knights ahead of the 2017 NRL season.

== Newcastle Knights (2017-18) ==
On 31 October 2016, Sio signed a 2-year contract to return to the National Rugby League with the Newcastle Knights.

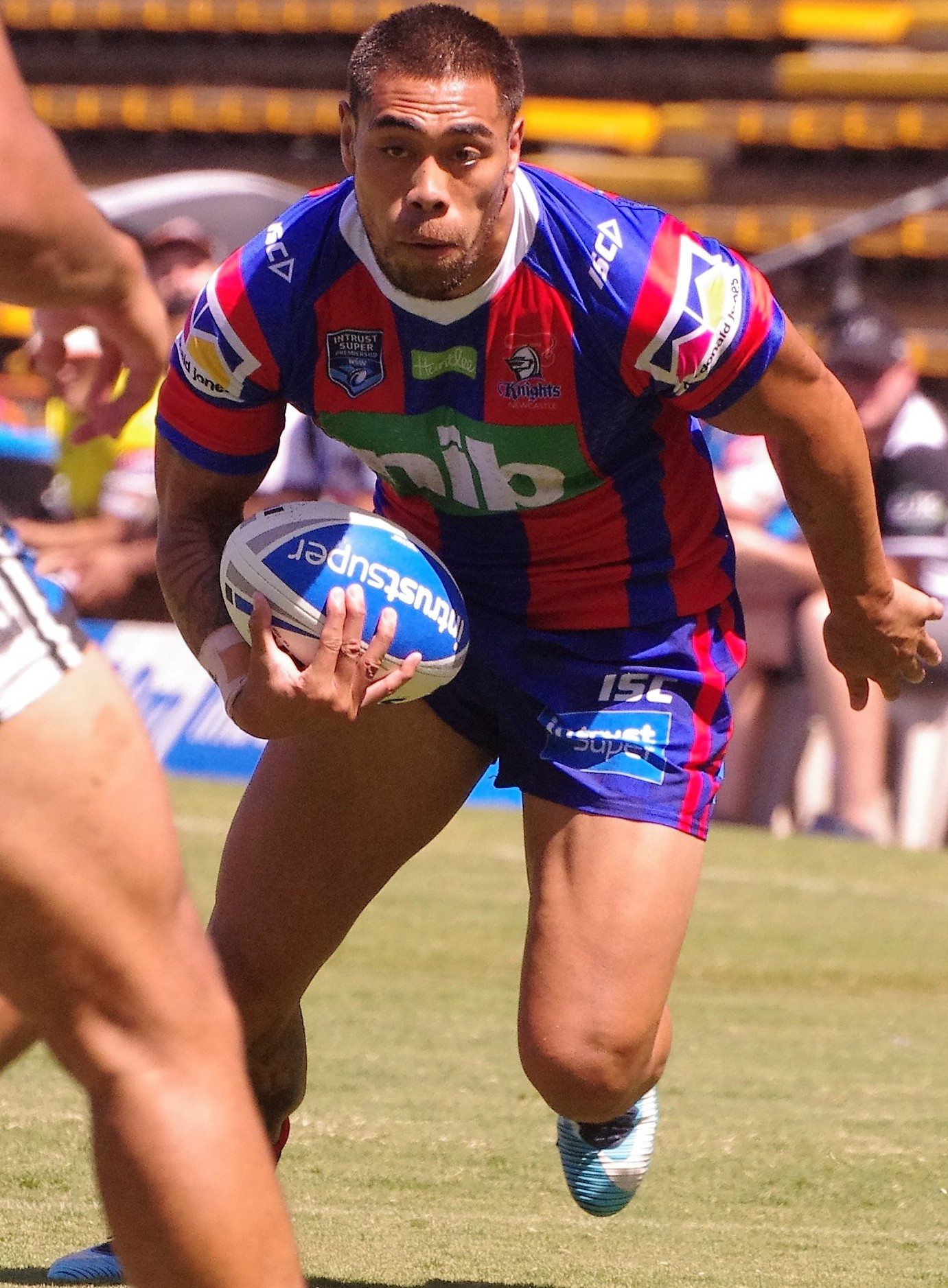
Sio playing for the Newcastle Knights in 2018

In the 2017 NRL season, Sio played 21 games and scored 5 tries as Newcastle finished last on the table for a third straight season.

On 21 April 2018, in round 7 of the 2018 season, Sio scored his first hat-trick of tries for Newcastle in their 22-20 win over the Wests Tigers at Tamworth.

Sio failed to come to terms with the Newcastle Knights over a new deal to remain at the club, after a well documented dispute over a contract that they had offered him previously. He then subsequently took the decision to make his return to the Super League.

== Salford Red Devils (2019 - 2023) ==
It was revealed on 18 October 2018, that Sio had signed a three-year contract to play for Salford in the Super League ahead of the 2019 season. Sio made his début for Salford on 1 February 2019, in a 14-34 victory over Huddersfield at the John Smiths Stadium.

He played in the 2019 Super League Grand Final defeat by St. Helens at Old Trafford. In round 22 of the 2021 Super League season, and scored four tries for Salford in a 42-14 victory over Hull F.C. At the end of the 2021 season the talented player finished as the competition's top try scorer. In round 2 of the 2022 Super League season, he scored four tries in a 38-12 victory over Toulouse Olympique. In round 19 of the 2022 Super League season, Sio scored a hat-trick in Salford's 32-6 win over Catalans. In the 2023 Super League season, Sio played 24 games for Salford and scored 12 tries as the club finished 7th on the table.

On 5 December 2023, Salford reported that he had departed on compassionate grounds, despite signing a new contract at the end of the 2023 season.

== International ==
On 25 June 2021 he played for the Combined Nations All Stars, and scored two tries, in their 26-24 victory over England, staged at the Halliwell Jones Stadium, Warrington, as part of England's 2021 Rugby League World Cup preparation.

After missing out on initial selection, he was called up as a replacement into the Samoa squad for the 2021 Rugby League World Cup.
