= Kevin Gordon (rugby league) =

Philippines dual-code rugby international footballer

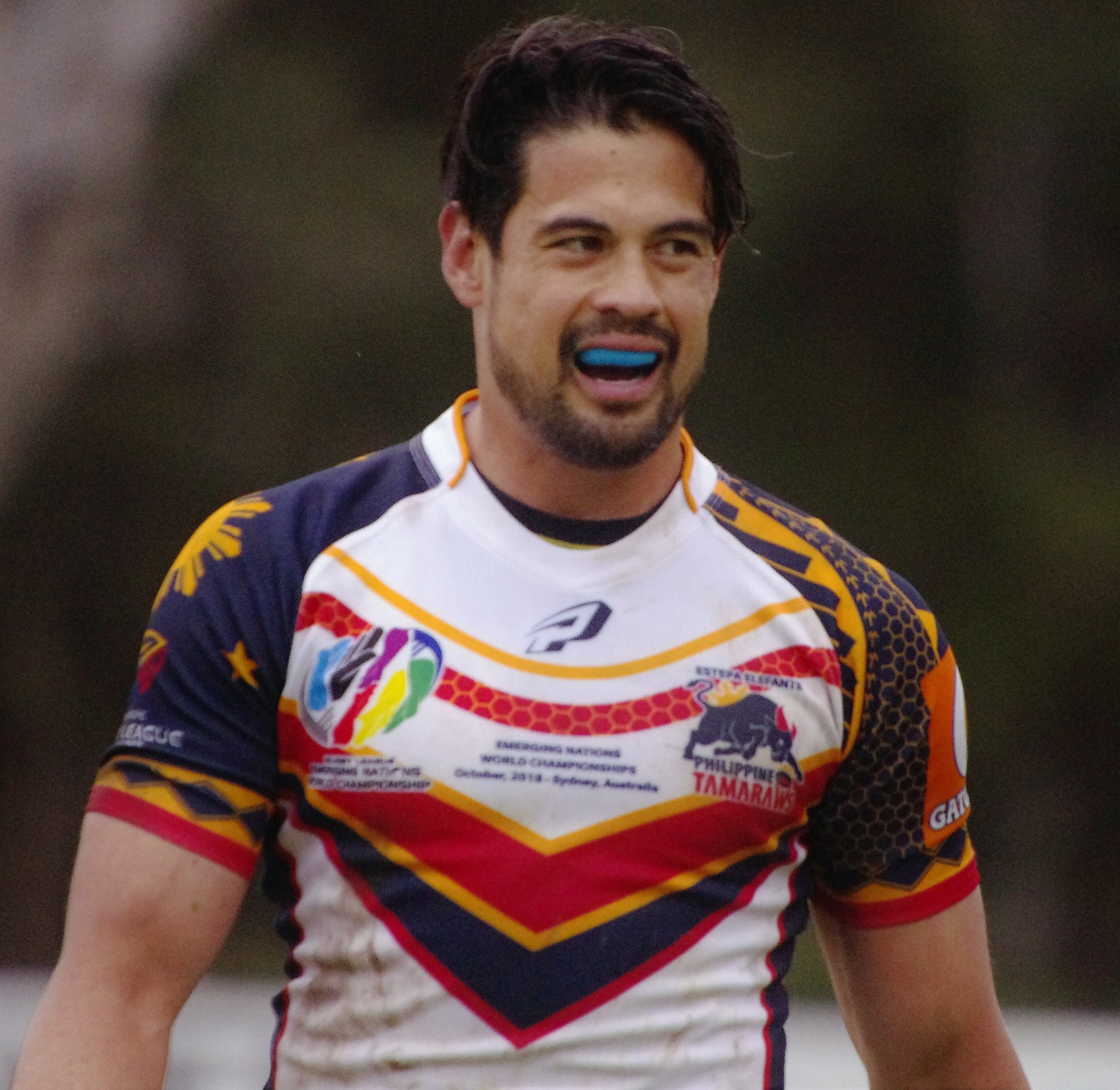

Personal information
- Born: 26 December 1989 (age 36) Coffs Harbour, New South Wales, Australia

Playing information
- Height: 180 cm (5 ft 11 in)
- Weight: 88 kg (13 st 12 lb)

Rugby league
- Position: Wing, Fullback
Club
Years	Team	Pld	T	G	FG	P
2009–15	Gold Coast Titans	118	58	17	0	266
Representative
Years	Team	Pld	T	G	FG	P
2012	Philippines	1	2	2	0	12
2013	Prime Minister's XIII	1	1	0	0	4
2014	NSW Country	1	1	0	0	4

Rugby union
Representative
Years	Team	Pld	T	G	FG	P
2017	Philippines	3	1	0	0	0

Kevin Sysu Gordon (born 26 December 1989) is a former Philippines international rugby league footballer. A New South Wales Country and Prime Minister's XIII representative, he played as a winger and fullback for the Gold Coast Titans in the National Rugby League (NRL). He played his entire career with the Titans in the NRL.

== Background ==
Gordon was born in Coffs Harbour, New South Wales, Australia. He is of Filipino, Chinese and Scottish descent.

He played his junior rugby league with the Sawtell Panthers, before being signed by the Gold Coast Titans. A member of the inaugural Titan's team in the National Youth Competition in 2008, Gordon scored 21 tries in the season. Gordon was named in the inaugural NYC Team of the Year in 2008.

Gordon is eligible for selection for several national teams as his mother of Chinese descent was born in the Philippines and his father is of Scottish descent. His brother Dennis is currently connected to the Titans squad also and plays for the Burleigh Bears in the Queensland Cup.

== Rugby league career ==
=== 2009 ===
Gordon commenced 2009 playing his second season in the under-20s competition but was selected to make his NRL debut for the Gold Coast Titans in Round 3 against the Canterbury-Bankstown Bulldogs, playing on the wing in the Titans 20–12 win at Cbus Super Stadium. In Round 8 against the Penrith Panthers, Gordon scored his first NRL career try in the Titans 34–20 loss at Penrith Stadium. Gordon finished his debut year in the NRL in as the Titans top try-scorer with 13 tries in 23 matches in the 2009 NRL season.

=== 2010 ===
Gordon began the 2010 NRL season as one of the Titan's first choice winger. Gordon proceeded to play in every single match for the Titans in the 2010 NRL season and was again the Titans top try-scorer with 12 tries in 26 matches.

=== 2011 ===
In Round 2 against the Melbourne Storm, Gordon injured his anterior cruciate ligament (ACL) in the Titans 40–12 loss at AAMI Park, ruling the promising winger out for the entire 2011 season. Gordon played in 2 matches for the Titans in the 2011 NRL season.

=== 2012 ===
After spending the first 3 rounds playing for the Burleigh Bears in the Queensland Cup, Gordon returned to the Titans first grade team in Round 4 against the New Zealand Warriors in the Titans 6–26 loss at Mt Smart Stadium. Gordon finished the 2012 NRL season with him playing in 21 matches and scoring 9 tries for the Titans. On 21 October 2012, Gordon made his international debut for the Philippines against Thailand. Gordon played at centre and scored 2 tries for the Philippines in their historic 86–0 win that saw the team crowned the inaugural Asian Cup champions.

=== 2013 ===
Gordon finished the 2013 NRL season as the Titans top try scorer with 15 tries in 22 matches. In Round 22 against the Canterbury-Bankstown Bulldogs, Gordon scored a hat-trick of tries in the Titans 26–16 win at ANZ Stadium. On 29 September, he played for the Prime Minister's XIII against Papua New Guinea, playing on the wing and scoring a try in his team's 50–10 win at Kokopo.

=== 2014 ===
In February 2014, Gordon was selected in the Gold Coast Titans inaugural 2014 Auckland Nines squad. On 26 February 2014, Gordon re-signed with Gold Coast for a further three seasons with the club until the end of the 2017 season under the new deal. In Round 6 against the Brisbane Broncos, Gordon played his 100th career match for the Titans in the 12–8 win at Cbus Super Stadium. Gordon was selected for the New South Wales Country Origin on the wing and scored a try in the 26-all draw against New South Wales City. In Round 22, against the Sydney Roosters, Gordon suffered a season ending hip injury in the Titans 18–26 loss at the SFS. Gordon finished the 2014 NRL season with him playing in 18 matches, scoring 7 tries and kicking 16 goals.

=== 2015 ===
At the start of the 2015 NRL season, there were reports that Gordon was on the outer with the Titans with Anthony Don and Kalifa Faifai Loa favoured ahead of him on the wing. Gordon played in Round 1 and, preparing for Round 2, Gordon suffered a nose injury at training after colliding with Titans recruit Leva Li. Gordon was sidelined for 2 matches before biding his time in the Queensland Cup playing for Burleigh Bears. He was recalled in Round 12 against the South Sydney Rabbitohs. Gordon's season was hampered by ongoing hip problems and bad form, resulting in him playing in 6 matches, scoring 1 try and kicking 1 goal for the Titans.

On 2 November 2015, Gordon announced his retirement from rugby league effective immediately, due to a chronic hip injury, and began to seek an acting career in the United States. Gordon finished his NRL career as a one club player with him playing in 118 matches, scoring 58 tries and kicking 17 goals for the Titans between 2009 and 2015.

== Rugby union career ==
Following his retirement from the NRL after a year in the United States pursuing acting, Gordon turned out for the Philippines national rugby union team in 2017, the "Volcanoes". Gordon made his test rugby union debut in the Asia Rugby Championship Div. 1 tournament, where the Philippines placed 3rd of 4, losing the first two tests and clinching the third against UAE. Gordon's brother Dennis previously played sevens for the Philippines, continuing a history of brothers representing the Philippine Volcanoes.
