= Caleb Binge =

Australian rugby league footballer

Personal information
- Born: 29 October 1993 (age 33) Lismore, New South Wales, Australia
- Height: 180 cm (5 ft 11 in)
- Weight: 104 kg (16 st 5 lb)

Playing information
- Position: Prop
Club
Years	Team	Pld	T	G	FG	P
2014	Gold Coast Titans	2	0	0	0	0
- Source: As of 22 September 2015

Caleb Binge (born 29 October 1993) is an Australian professional rugby league footballer for the Gold Coast Titans of the National Rugby League. He primarily plays prop.

== Playing career ==
Born in Lismore, New South Wales, Binge played his junior football for the Ballina Seagulls before being signed by the Brisbane Broncos. Upon moving to Brisbane, Binge attended Wavell State High School. He represented Queensland Under 16's in 2009 and Queensland Under 18's in 2011. He played for the Broncos' NYC team in 2011. In 2012, Binge joined the Gold Coast Titans and played for their NYC team through to 2013 before moving on to their Queensland Cup team, Tweed Heads Seagulls in 2014.

In round 14 of the 2014 NRL season, Binge made his NRL debut for the Gold Coast against the Melbourne Storm off the interchange bench in the 24–20 loss at Cbus Super Stadium. Binge didn't play in first grade again until the Titans last match of the 2014 season in Round 26 against the Canterbury-Bankstown Bulldogs at Cbus Super Stadium, where he was a late inclusion on the interchange bench after the retiring Titans foundation player Luke Bailey failed to recover from a neck injury before the Titans comeback 19–18 golden point extra time win. Binge finished off his debut year in the NRL with him playing in two matches for the Gold Coast outfit in the 2014 NRL season. In 2015, Binge played for the Tweed Seagulls in the Queensland Cup competition. He would later go on to play for the Narrabri Blues in the country competition.

== Controversy ==
In October 2010, Binge's father, Chris, alleged that Binge was racially vilified by NRL player Timana Tahu at an Aboriginal knock-out carnival. On 19 November 2014, Binge pleaded guilty to low-range drink driving and was fined $900 along with having his licence suspended for three months.
