= Jarrod Mullen =

Australian rugby league footballer

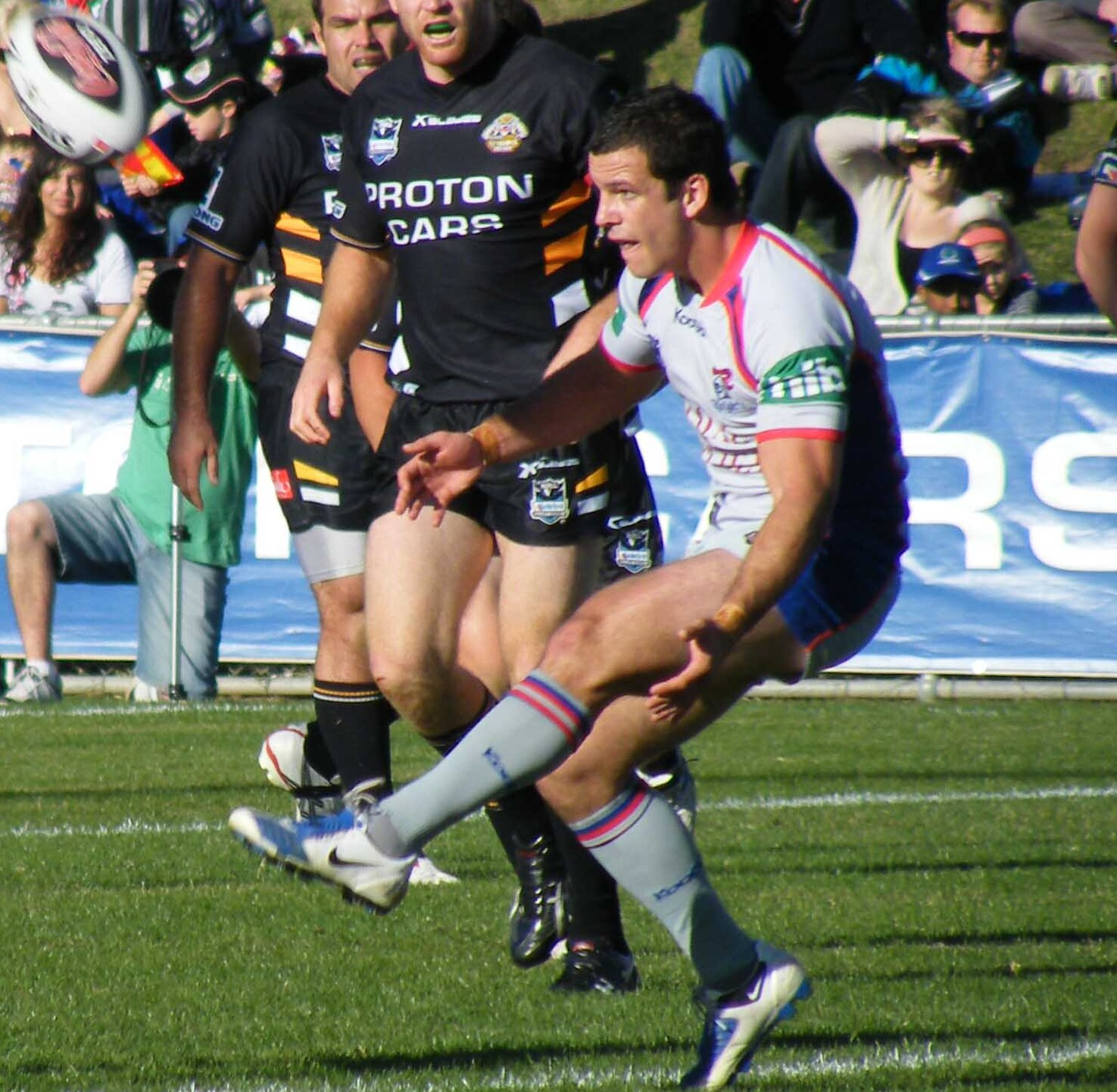

Personal information
- Full name: Jarrod Stephen Mullen
- Born: 9 April 1987 (age 39) Singleton, New South Wales, Australia

Playing information
- Height: 178 cm (5 ft 10 in)
- Weight: 88 kg (13 st 12 lb)
- Position: Five-eighth, Halfback
Club
Years	Team	Pld	T	G	FG	P
2005–16	Newcastle Knights	211	39	0	9	165
Representative
Years	Team	Pld	T	G	FG	P
2007	New South Wales	1	0	0	0	0
2009–14	NSW Country	4	0	0	0	0

Jarrod Stephen Mullen (born 9 April 1987) is an Australian former professional rugby league footballer. He last played for the Sunshine Coast Falcons in the Queensland Cup. A New South Wales State of Origin representative, he played at five-eighth and halfback. He previously played for Newcastle Knights in the National Rugby League (NRL).

== Background ==
Born in Singleton, New South Wales, he moved to Newcastle with his family when he was nine. Son of Leeann and Steve Mullen, a former rugby league footballer who played for the Canterbury-Bankstown Bulldogs and Western Suburbs Magpies in the 1980s.

== Playing career ==
=== Early career ===
Mullen played his first rugby league game aged seven for the Taree-Old Bar Lifesavers (now known as Taree Panthers). Two years later (after a brief stint playing soccer), Mullen relocated to Newcastle, where he continued his junior career with the Western Suburbs club. His first representative game was for St Therese's Primary School, New Lambton, in the Regional Knights Knockout competition, with the school winning the competition in 1996 and 1997. He played most of his junior football at five-eighth.

Mullen joined the Knights as a junior in 1997. He played five-eighth for the NSW under-17s in 2004.

While attending St. Francis Xavier's College in Hamilton, Mullen played for the Australian Schoolboys team in 2004 and 2005.

=== 2005 ===
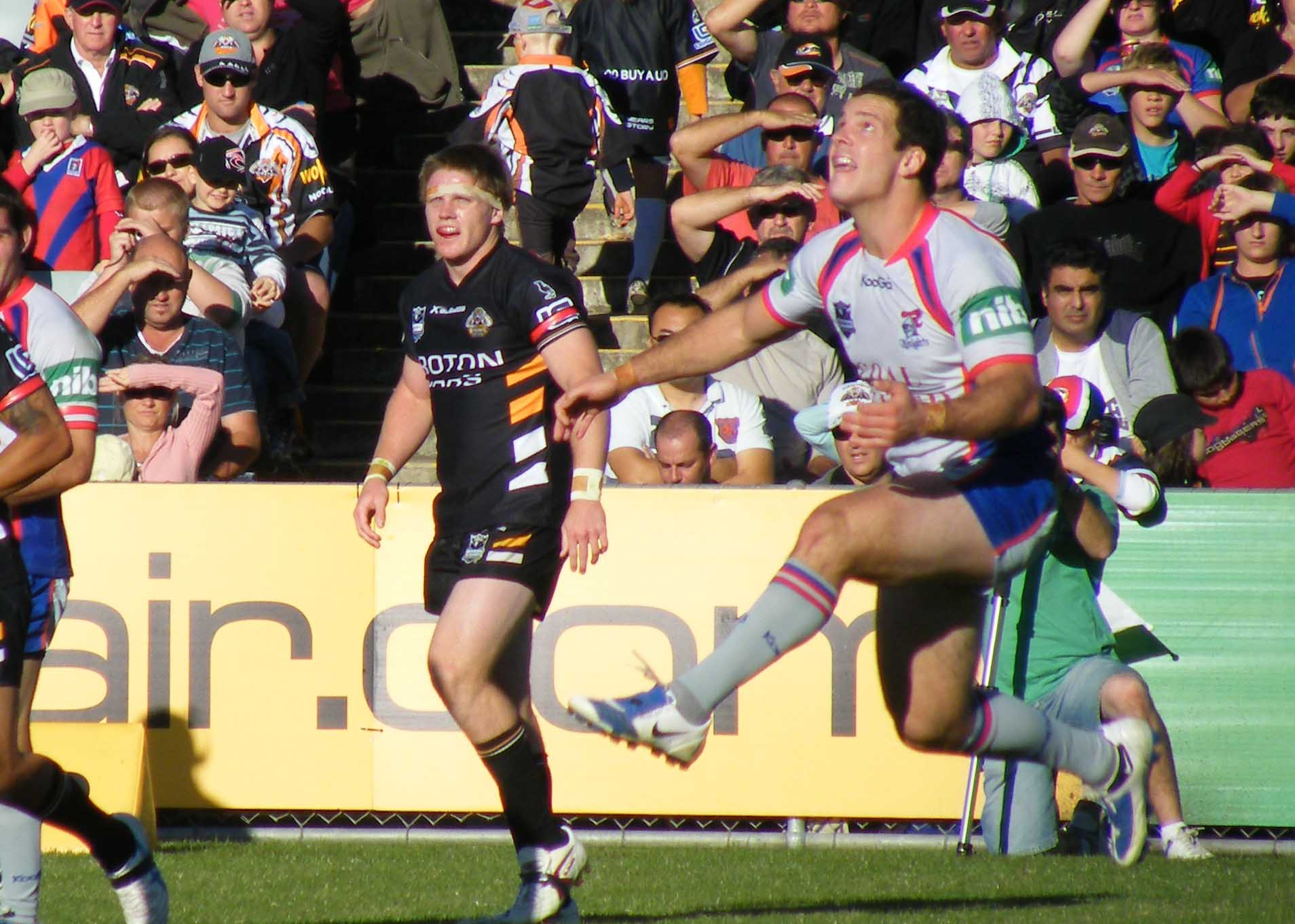
Mullen kicks the ball in a game in 2009.

Coach Michael Hagan picked Mullen for the first-grade squad aged 18. His first grade debut was on 15 May 2005 at Energy Australia Stadium against the Wests Tigers in round 10. Mullen played eight games for Newcastle in his debut year as the club finished last on the table.

=== 2006 ===
Mullen played 15 games for Newcastle in the 2006 NRL season as Newcastle qualified for the finals. Mullen played in the club's 50-6 elimination finals loss against the Brisbane Broncos at the Sydney Football Stadium.

=== 2007 ===
In 2007, Mullen was selected as starting five-eighth for the Knights. On 10 April 2007, the day after Mullen turned 20, Johns announced his shock retirement from rugby league due to a neck injury. Mullen became first-choice halfback. After playing nine first grade games as halfback and 31 games in total, he was a shock pick at that position for the New South Wales Blues in the 2007 State of Origin series. Mullen was dropped after one game, a match in which NSW let slip an 18-6 halftime lead to lose 25–18. He would never manage to gain selection for New South Wales again.

=== 2008-2016 ===
Mullen continued to play for Newcastle and featured in the club's finals campaigns in 2009 and in 2013 where they reached the preliminary final against the Sydney Roosters under the coaching of Wayne Bennett.

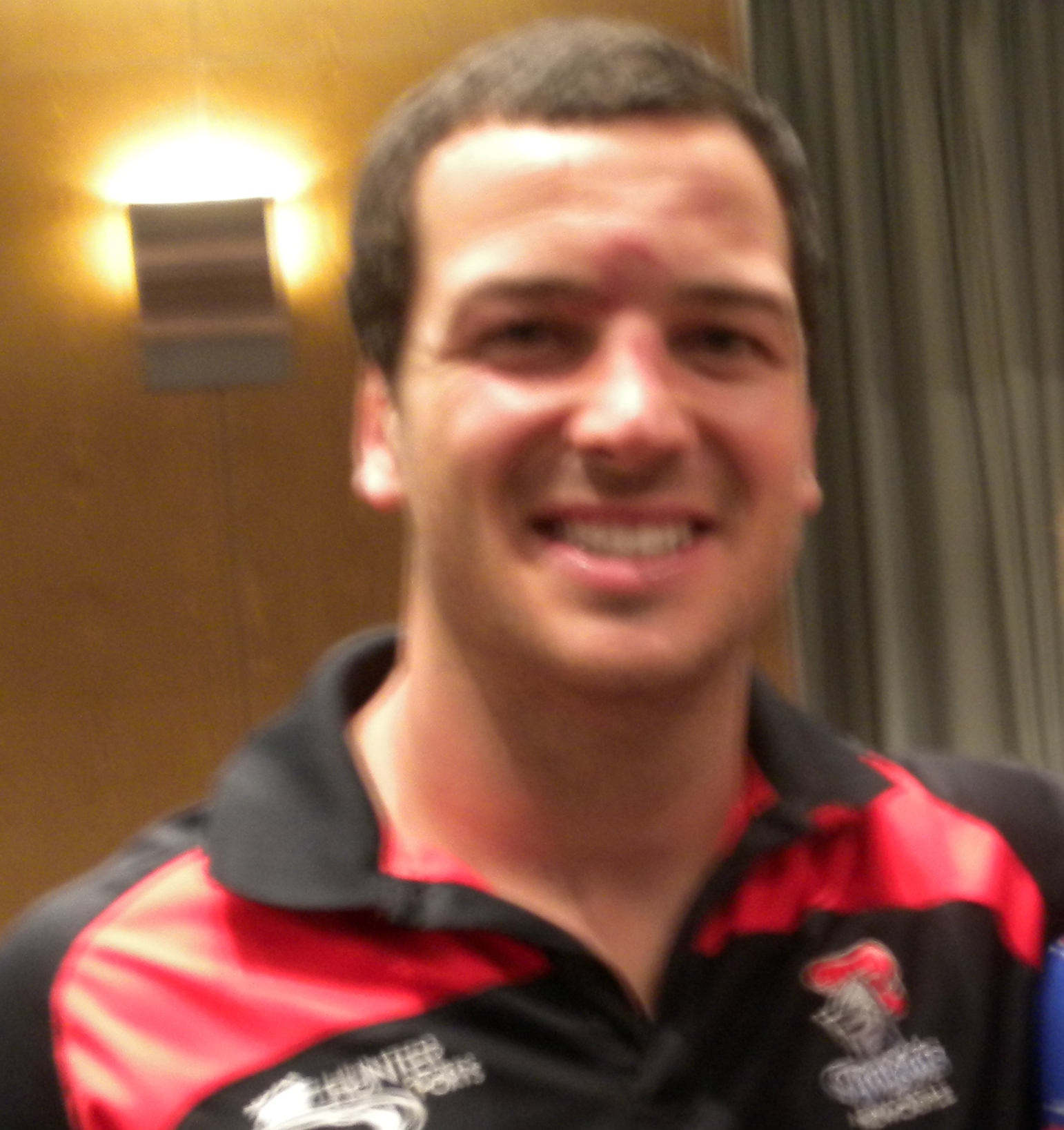
Mulle in 2012

In 2015 and 2016, Mullen was part of the Newcastle sides which finished last on the table.

=== 2017 ===
During a pre-season training session in November 2016, Mullen was tested, with the A-sample testing positive for an anabolic steroid and he was provisionally suspended on 17 January 2017 by the NRL. Mullen's B-sample tested positive to the steroid Drostanolone, confirmed by the Australian Sports Anti-Doping Authority (ASADA) on 7 March 2017 and he was handed a Notice of Alleged Anti-Doping Rule Violations. Mullen opted to challenge the matter with the anti-doping tribunal.

On 2 May 2017, the NRL Anti-Doping Tribunal imposed a four-year ban on Mullen, with a period of ineligibility backdated to the beginning of his mandatory provisional suspension, which began on 17 January 2017.

== Representative career ==
Mullen was selected in his first senior representative team, the Prime Minister's XIII, for a game against Papua New Guinea in 2006. He played with a young team in Port Moresby on 30 September, starting on the bench as a utility player. In 2007, he was picked for the New South Wales side. Mullen was not selected in the NSW State of Origin team for Game 2 due to a torn calf muscle. In opening rounds of 2008, Mullen again showed promise but succumbed to a calf injury in Round 4. Outstanding performances on his return against competition leaders Gold Coast and Melbourne thrust him back into Origin contention, jostling for the halfback spot with Brisbane's Peter Wallace, Manly's Matt Orford and Parramatta's Brett Finch.

Mullen has played for Country in the annual City vs Country on four occasions between 2009 and 2014.

== Controversies ==
In March 2019, it was revealed that Mullen almost died of a drug overdose at a friend's party back in December 2018. Mullen was taken to hospital in a critical condition and spent two days in intensive care as a result. In the following days, the Newcastle Knights released a statement denying that any of the club's current players were at the party. Newcastle CEO Phil Gardner said "To the best of my knowledge, none of our top 36 were at any of those parties, I think the reports aren’t accurate. I don’t know why they’re being reported. But it certainly doesn’t represent the facts".

On 4 December 2019, Mullen pleaded guilty at Newcastle Local Court to one charge of supplying cocaine. Mullen was arrested by police in May 2019 and was initially charged with four counts of supplying a prohibited drug. Agreed facts tendered to court stated Mullen purchased a total of 39 grams of cocaine from a co-offender between 23 and 30 November in 2018 for the purpose of supply and personal use.

A pre-sentence report was scheduled ahead of his sentence in February 2020.

On 26 February 2020, Mullen avoided jail and was instead given a two-year community corrections order and 300 hours of community service.
