= Glen Buttriss =

Australian rugby league footballer

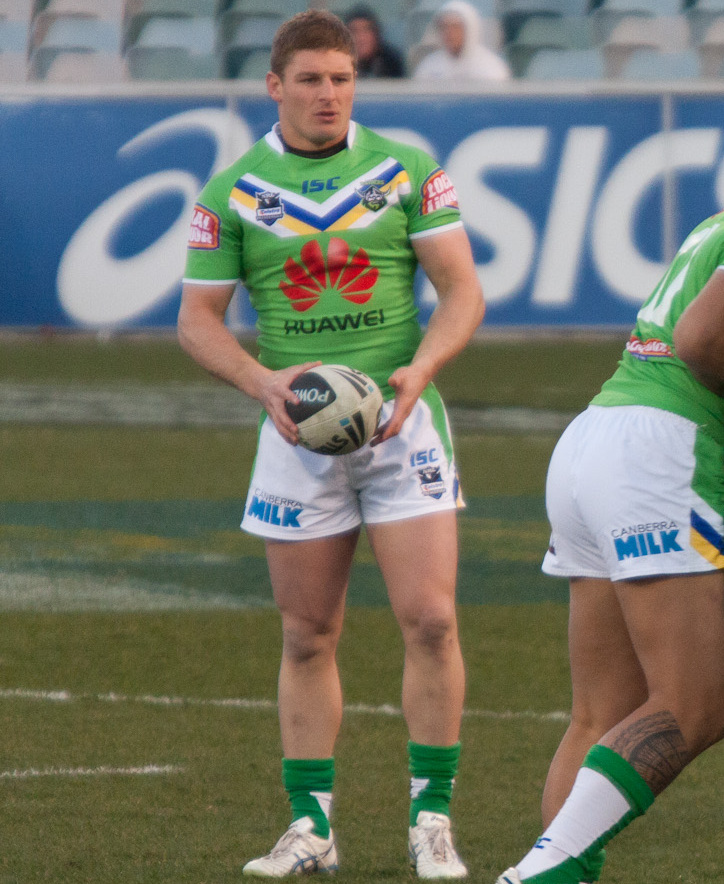

Personal information
- Full name: Glen Buttriss
- Born: 20 August 1985 (age 41) Cootamundra, New South Wales, Australia

Playing information
- Height: 180 cm (5 ft 11 in)
- Weight: 93 kg (14 st 9 lb)
- Position: Hooker
Club
Years	Team	Pld	T	G	FG	P
2008–15	Canberra Raiders	119	7	0	0	28

Glen Buttriss (born 20 August 1985) is an Australian former professional rugby league footballer who played in the 2000s and 2010s for the Canberra Raiders in the National Rugby League. Buttriss primarily played at the hooker and lock positions.

Buttriss is from a small town, Cootamundra, in southwest New South Wales.

== Playing career ==
Buttriss made his debut for Canberra against Melbourne in Round 6 2008. Buttriss went on to make a total of 119 appearances for Canberra between 2008 and 2015.

On 16 February 2017, Buttriss was announced as captain for The Mount Pritchard Mounties in The NSW Intrust Super Premiership.

On 2 October 2017, it was announced that Buttriss had returned home to Cootamundra to play for the Cootamundra Bulldogs in the local competition.

== Post playing ==
Buttriss currently works at the Melba Copland Secondary School and College as a youth worker. He also spent time as an earth mover tyre fitter in mining.
