= Paul Carter (rugby league) =

Australian rugby league footballer (born 1992)

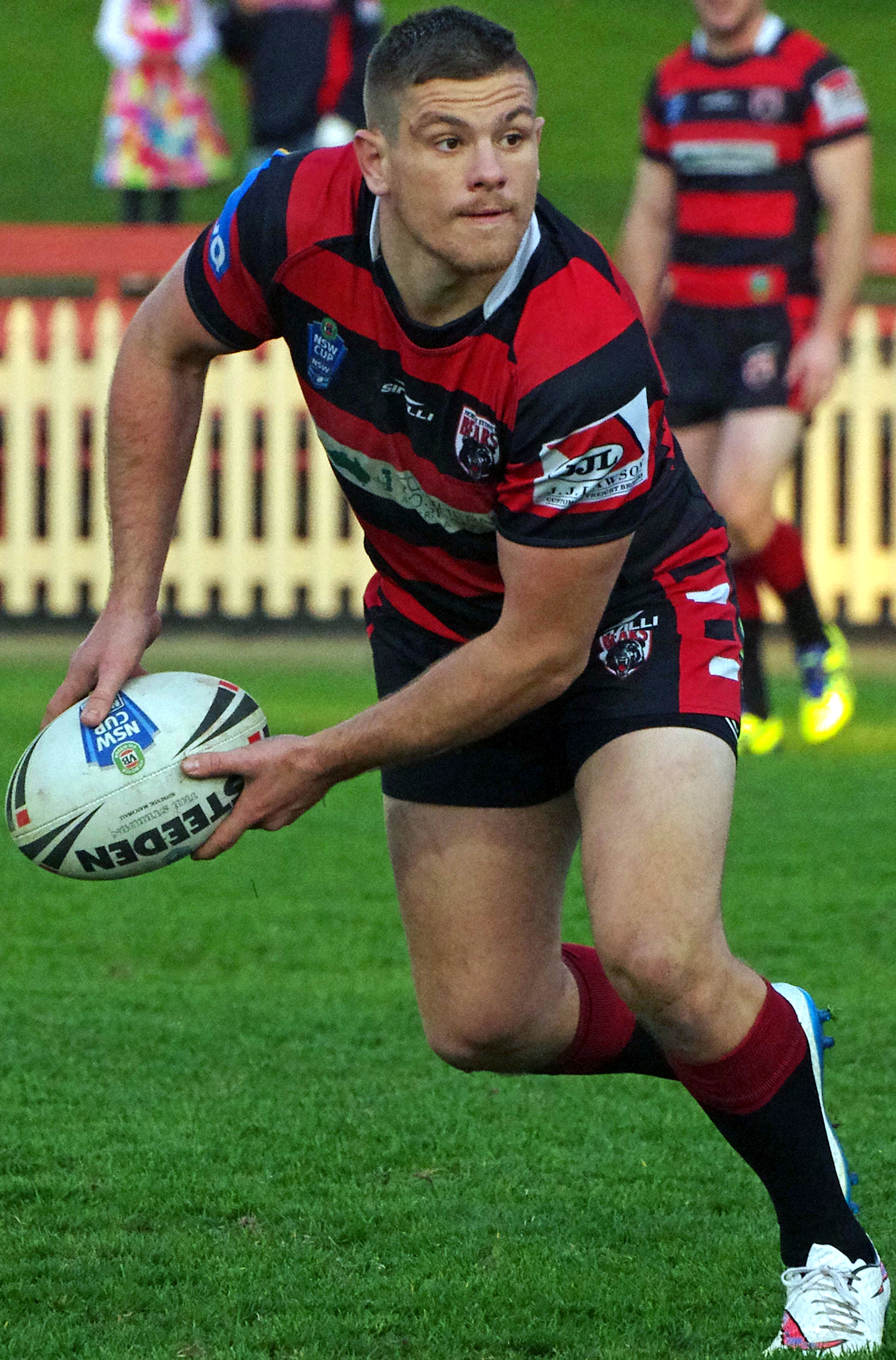

Personal information
- Born: 23 May 1992 (age 34) Penrith, New South Wales, Australia
- Height: 180 cm (5 ft 11 in)
- Weight: 98 kg (15 st 6 lb)

Playing information
- Position: Lock, Second-row, Hooker
Club
Years	Team	Pld	T	G	FG	P
2014	Gold Coast Titans	21	1	0	0	4
2015–16	South Sydney	16	2	0	0	8
2017	Sydney Roosters	3	0	0	0	0
	Total	40	3	0	0	12
- Source: As of 7 June 2017

Paul Carter (born 23 May 1992) is an Australian professional rugby league footballer who last played for the Sydney Roosters in the NRL. He primarily plays at lock and in the second-row, but can also fill in at hooker. He previously played for the Gold Coast Titans, South Sydney Rabbitohs and the Sydney Roosters.

== Background ==
Born in Penrith, New South Wales, Carter played his junior rugby league for the Wyong Roos, before being signed by the Canterbury-Bankstown Bulldogs.

Carter is the son of former Penrith Panthers and Widnes Vikings player Steve Carter.

== Playing career ==
=== Early career ===
From 2010 to 2012, Carter played for the Canterbury-Bankstown Bulldogs' NYC team. In November and December 2010, he played for the Australian Schoolboys. On 21 April 2012, he played for the New South Wales Under-20s team in New South Wales' 18–14 win over Queensland at Penrith Stadium. On 21 August 2012, he was named at lock in the 2012 NYC Team of the Year.

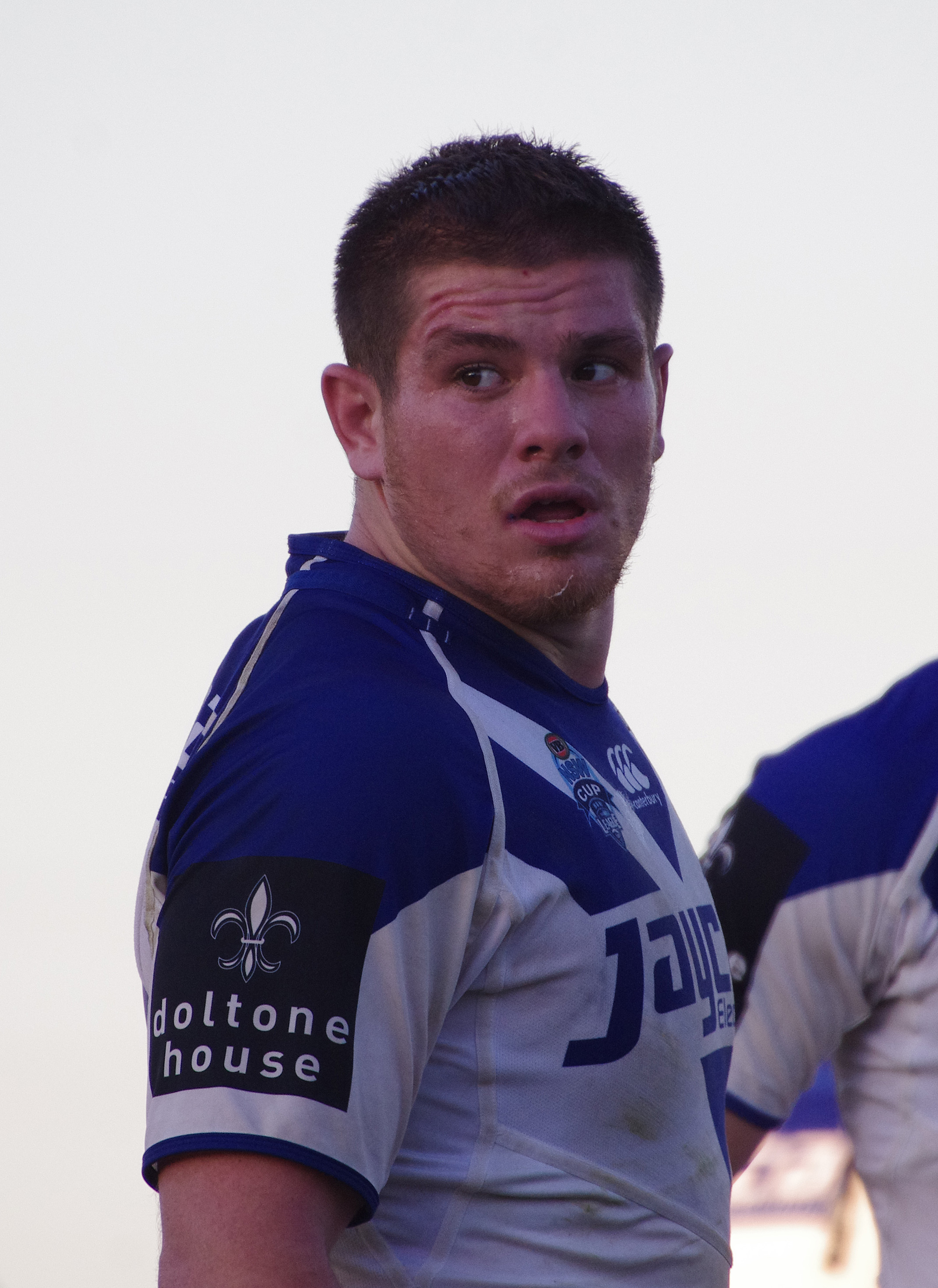
Carter playing for the Bulldogs in 2013

On 17 July 2013, he played for the New South Wales Residents against the Queensland Residents.

=== 2014 ===
On 14 August 2013, Carter signed a 2-year contract with the Gold Coast Titans starting in 2014. In February 2014, he played for the Titans in the inaugural NRL Auckland Nines. In Round 1 of the 2014 NRL season, he made his NRL debut for the Titans against the Cronulla-Sutherland Sharks off the interchange bench in the Titans' 18–12 win at Remondis Stadium. In Round 3 against the Canberra Raiders, he scored his first career try in the Titans 24–12 win at Canberra Stadium. On 12 June 2014, he was stood down by the Titans for 2 matches after being charged with high range drink driving at Surfers Paradise. He later returned to the Titans first-grade squad in Round 17 against the South Sydney Rabbitohs, playing at lock in the Titans 14–10 win at ANZ Stadium. He finished off his debut year in the NRL, having played in 21 matches and scoring 1 try for the Titans. On 20 December 2014, his Titans contract was terminated due to disciplinary reasons.

=== 2015 ===
On 15 June 2015, Carter signed a 1 1/2-year contract with the South Sydney Rabbitohs effective immediately. He made his Rabbitohs debut in Round 23 against the North Queensland Cowboys.

=== 2016 ===
On 12 July, Carter had his Rabbitohs contract terminated following a breach of the club's code of conduct and specific clauses of his contract. In October, he signed a 1-year contract with the Sydney Roosters starting in 2017.

=== 2017 ===
On 7 June, Carter was released from the Roosters effective immediately and without comment. On 13 July 2017 it was revealed that Carter was playing for The Coffs Harbour Comets on The NSW Mid North Coast in The Group 2 division. In November 2017, it was announced that The Cessnock Goannas were attempting to sign Carter on a 2-year contract but were told by The CRL that Carter had his registration as a player cancelled. CRL Operations Manager Bert Lowrie said "Carter has been deregistered by the board "based on his history" and "will remain that way until he makes an application to be registered".

=== Misconduct ===
Carter's career has been marred by alcohol abuse, which led to his contracts with the Gold Coast and South Sydney being torn up.

In 2014 season (while contracted with the Gold Coast) Carter was twice charged with drink driving. His first charge was in June, the Court gave him a $14,000 fine and suspended him from driving for 12 months. In December (six months later) he was charged with high-range drink driving while driving unlicensed. Following the incident Coach Neil Henry commented that "Paul has had an opportunity... we've put measures in place to help him out with a few of the issues he has and he was making some progress but to go and transgress again, especially when the courts have said he's unlicensed, that's unacceptable".

In July 2016 (while contracted with South Sydney) Carter was sacked because he failed to attend a training session following a weekend bender. This was not Carter's first breach of conduct with the club. A month earlier (June 2016) Carter and teammate Kirisome Auva'a were both stood down for turning up to training under the influence of alcohol.

Following Carter's sacking by South Sydney, he checked into an alcohol rehabilitation centre in Thailand.

On 11 October 2017, Carter again made headlines when it was alleged that he went to the house of former teammate Blake Ferguson. According to authorities, Carter and Ferguson were drinking until 3AM when Ferguson asked Carter to leave the house as he had young children asleep inside. It is then alleged that after Carter left Ferguson's property he made a phone call to the authorities saying that Ferguson had given his two young children drugs. The Police then knocked on Ferguson's door around 5:15AM to respond for a call to welfare of the two young children. After emergency services checked the children they found no wrongdoing from Ferguson nor any drugs in the house.

On 29 November 2017, Carter failed to appear in court for sentencing relating to supply of cocaine. Carter was due to be sentenced for supplying a small quantity of cocaine to ex-teammate Shaun Kenny-Dowall at The Ivy nightclub in May 2017. It was revealed that Carter was overseas in a rehabilitation center. The magistrate said in relation to Carter failing to appear at court as being "Unacceptable, absolutely unacceptable". The magistrate ordered that sentencing be moved to 10 January 2018.

On 13 December 2017, it was reported that Carter was involved in a fake jersey scam where he allegedly sold fake merchandise to a fan over eBay. Carter then admitted to the buyer that the jerseys were fake and he needed the money because he was struggling financially. The fan claimed that he sent Carter $2000 as he felt the troubled player needed help and that Carter would pay him back once he joined The Sydney Roosters. Carter was later sacked by The Roosters and the money was never paid back to the buyer.

On 10 January 2018, Carter was handed a two-year good behaviour bond by the court and escaped a jail sentence.

On 15 January 2019, it was revealed that Carter was accused of being at the center of a video leaking scandal regarding former teammate Dylan Napa. Carter had vehemently denied he was leaking the Dylan Napa sex tapes as part of a campaign to extort money from his former teammate. A senior staff member at the Sydney Roosters claimed that Carter was a past member of a WhatsApp player group and had access to "all the videos". It was claimed that Carter fell out with Napa 18 months ago and he wanted money in exchange for keeping the videos private.

Carter responded to the claims saying "I heard the allegations from people close to me, who messaged me in disbelief asking, 'What’s going on here?’ I was in shock. "When I was at the Roosters, I had a great relationship with Dylan and still do to this day. He sent me a message confirming the exact same thing: that we have a good relationship and there’s no bad blood. I left the Roosters but there’s no bad blood with the club or any of the players, I haven’t read the message and probably won’t. I’ve got bigger and better things to worry about than people playing games and making up stories. It’s sad that they don’t have anything better to do with their lives".

In December 2023, it was reported that Carter had avoided jail time after being found guilty of spitting in his ex-girlfriend's face on three occasions and also physically assaulting her.

On 10 May 2024, Carter was granted bail after fronting court for breaching release conditions in a previous domestic violence case. It was also alleged he failed to complete any of his 140 hours of court-mandated community service following a 2023 domestic violence conviction.
