= Tom Kingston (rugby league) =

Australian rugby league footballer

Personal information
- Born: 3 May 1988 (age 37) Tweed Heads, New South Wales, Australia
- Height: 189 cm (6 ft 2 in)
- Weight: 100 kg (15 st 10 lb)

Playing information
- Position: Second-row
Club
| Years | Team | Pld | T | G | FG | P |
|---|---|---|---|---|---|---|
| 2014 | Gold Coast Titans | 6 | 0 | 0 | 0 | 0 |
- Source: RLP

Tom Kingston (born 3 May 1988) is an Australian former professional rugby league footballer. He previously played for the Gold Coast Titans in the National Rugby League. He primarily played second-row.

== Background ==
Born in Tweed Heads, New South Wales, Kingston attended St. Josephs' Primary School and St. Joseph's College, Tweed Heads and played his junior football for the Tweed Heads Seagulls before being signed by the Gold Coast Titans.

== Playing career ==
In 2008, Kingston played for the Gold Coast Titans' NYC team before moving on to the Titans' Queensland Cup team, Tweed Heads Seagulls in 2009.

In Round 17 of the 2014 NRL season, Kingston made his NRL debut for the Titans against the South Sydney Rabbitohs.

On 12 September 2014, Kingston re-signed with the Titans on a 1-year contract.

On 5 November 2014, several months after signing his contract extension Kingston decided to retire from rugby league to take up a post in the Australian Defence Force.
