= Brad Tighe =

Australian rugby league footballer

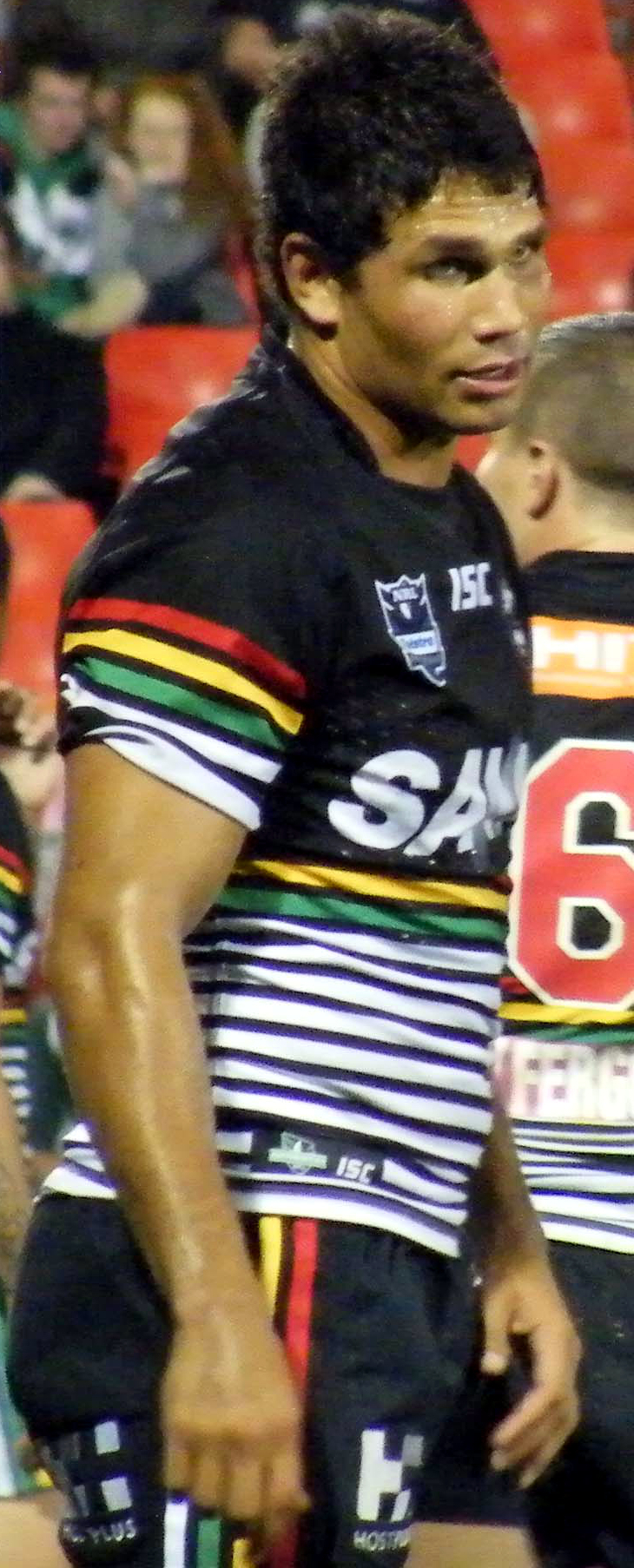

Personal information
- Full name: Bradley Tighe
- Born: 5 April 1984 (age 42) Moree, New South Wales, Australia

Playing information
- Height: 182 cm (6 ft 0 in)
- Weight: 85 kg (13 st 5 lb)
- Position: Centre, Wing
Club
Years	Team	Pld	T	G	FG	P
2005–07	Newcastle Knights	44	20	2	0	84
2008–13	Penrith Panthers	113	41	0	0	164
2014–15	Gold Coast Titans	14	4	0	0	16
	Total	171	65	2	0	264
Representative
Years	Team	Pld	T	G	FG	P
2015	Indigenous All Stars	1	0	0	0	0

Bradley Tighe (born 5 April 1984) is an Australian former professional rugby league footballer. He played at centre and wing and played for the Newcastle Knights, Penrith Panthers and Gold Coast Titans in the National Rugby League.

== Playing career ==
Tighe was brought into first-grade in 2005 during a run of injuries at the Newcastle club.

His first year in the NRL personally was successful, playing twenty games and scoring fifty-two points. However Newcastle's season as a whole saw the club finish last on the table and claim the wooden spoon.

Tighe spent the majority of 2006 back in the premier league but secured an almost permanent position at centre during 2007. During the season, Tighe was informed by coach Brian Smith that his services would not be required beyond the end of 2007.

In 2008, Tighe began playing for the Penrith Panthers and was a regular in the starting line up.

On 7 January 2014, with two years of his contract remaining, Tighe was released in a deal that saw Jamal Idris move to Penrith on a three-year deal and Tighe to the Gold Coast on a two-year deal. After departing the Gold Coast, Tighe played four seasons with Western Suburbs in the local Newcastle rugby league competition before retiring at the end of the 2019 season.

== Career highlights ==
- Junior Representative Selection: 2001 – selected for the New South Wales under 17 squad to play Queensland under 17s at Stadium Australia, 10 June, the curtain raiser to the second State of Origin match.
- First Grade Debut: 2005 – Round 2, Penrith vs Canberra Raiders at Canberra Stadium, 19 March,
- Indigenous All Stars Selection: vs the All Stars at Cbus Super Stadium, 13 February 2015
