= William Zillman =

Australian rugby league footballer

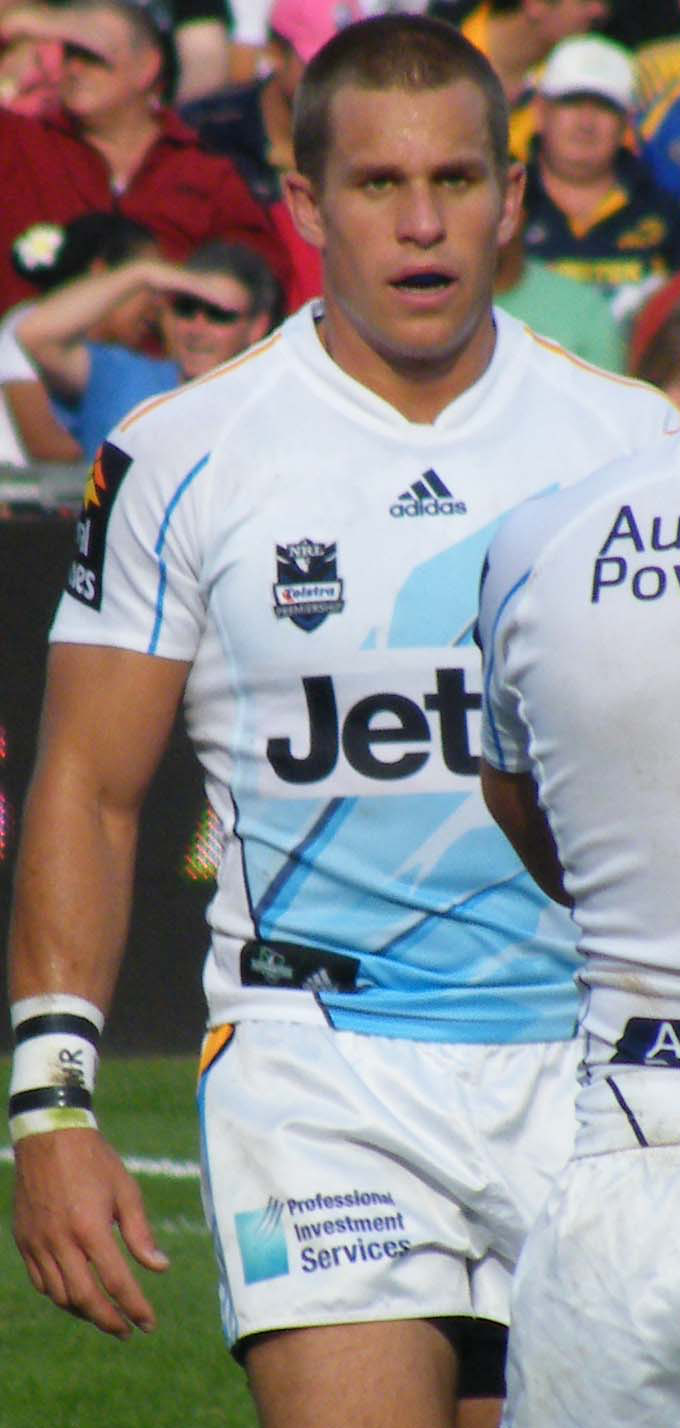

Personal information
- Full name: William Gary Zillman
- Born: 30 July 1986 (age 40) Brisbane, Queensland, Australia

Playing information
- Height: 180 cm (5 ft 11 in)
- Weight: 89 kg (14 st 0 lb)
- Position: Fullback, Wing, Centre, Five-eighth
Club
Years	Team	Pld	T	G	FG	P
2006–08	Canberra Raiders	24	12	0	0	48
2009–17	Gold Coast Titans	156	42	0	1	169
	Total	180	54	0	1	217

William Gary "Zilly" Zillman (born 30 July 1986) is an Australian former professional rugby league footballer who played in the 2000s and 2010s, he played in the National Rugby League. His usual position is at fullback but can also play five-eighth. Zillman has previously played for the Canberra Raiders and Gold Coast Titans.

== Playing career ==
=== Early years ===
He is of German descent. Zillman played rugby league during his junior years with Rochedale Brothers, but while studying at St Laurence's College in South Brisbane he played five years of rugby union, captaining the 1st XV side in his final year at the college. Playing at inside-centre in union, Zillman was selected in the 2003 Queensland Schoolboys squad and from the national tournament was selected to represent his country in the 2003 Australian Schoolboys tour.

The following year after his high school success, Zillman returned to rugby league to play with the Canberra Raiders Queensland-based feeder club the Souths Logan Magpies. Zillman's strong performances with the magpies saw him offered a junior contract with the Canberra Raiders to play in the Jersey Flegg Cup and Premier League with an opportunity to move up into the National Rugby League. Zillman performed well in Canberra and was rewarded with the significant starting role of five-eight in the Queensland under-19s squad in a 2005 State of Origin curtain-raiser. More representative honours came Zillman's way as he was a vital member of Canberra's finals campaign in Premier League, earning him selection in the 2005 Junior Kangaroos and the Australian Invitational XIII as a fullback.

=== Canberra Raiders ===
After proving himself with Canberra's Premier League squad and with strong appearances for the junior Queensland and Australian sides, Zillman was rewarded with his first NRL appearance early in the 2006 season.

His first grade debut in the National Rugby League was against the Newcastle Knights in round 2 of 2006 at Canberra Stadium. At 19 years of age Zillman was named in the starting squad at fullback and although scoring two tries on debut, Canberra went down 70–32 in a record-breaking heavy defeat by Newcastle. Coach at the time Matthew Elliott named Zillman on the bench for round 4 and round 5 of the 2006 season, but Zillman played the remainder of the season back in Premier League as he was stuck behind Canberra's first-choice full-back Clinton Schifcofske, who was the current captain at the time and a Queensland State of Origin representative.

In credit to Zillman, Schifcofske had won the Dally M Fullback of the Year which didn't help Zillman break into first grade. The young Queenslander didn't let this set-back get in the way of his rugby as he amassed 17 tries in the Premier League season, securing another Australian jersey through selection in the 2006 Junior Kangaroos.

When Shifcofske announced during the middle of the 2006 season he had made the decision to switch codes to sign with rugby union club the Queensland Reds for the 2007 season, the opportunity to once-again play in the NRL arose.

After Schifcofskes' departure, Zillman was set to cement his place in Canberra's starting line-up during the 2007 season. In his second match of the year in round 3, Zillman scored a hat-trick of tries in Canberra's 48–18 win over the Newcastle Knights, ironically the team that served a thrashing to Zillman in his NRL debut the previous year. Zillman continued to impress with his solid and consistent form, starting in 17 matches, scoring 9 tries for a total of 36 points. Then injury woes struck as he ruptured his anterior cruciate ligament against the North Queensland Cowboys which would require reconstructive surgery and side-line Zillman for the remainder of the season.

The following year would prove catastrophic for the young Queenslander as Zillman re-injured his knee against the Penrith Panthers in only round 2 of the 2008 season.

At only 21 years of age it was confirmed he would undergo his second knee re-construction in as many seasons and would be ruled out for the entire season. Zillman signed for the Gold Coast Titans soon after this injury. He played just 24 games for Canberra.

=== Gold Coast Titans ===
Zillman joined the Gold Coast Titans at the start of the 2009 NRL season on a four-year contract worth close to one-million dollars. He played his first full game for the club in a trial match against the Cronulla-Sutherland Sharks filling in at fullback for the injured Preston Campbell. Zillman played over 150 games for the club, and was an option for Queensland Maroons in the State of Origin, although being struck by injury multiple times. Zillman left the club at the end of the 2017 season.

== Statistics ==
Year	Team	Games	Tries	FGs	Pts
2006	Canberra Raiders	3	2		8
2007	Canberra Raiders	19	9		36
2008	Canberra Raiders	2	1		4
2009	Gold Coast Titans	22	4		16
2010	Gold Coast Titans	23	8		32
2011	Gold Coast Titans	24	11		44
2012	Gold Coast Titans	21	6		24
2013	Gold Coast Titans	16	6		24
2014	Gold Coast Titans	16	2	1	9
2015	Gold Coast Titans	10	3		12
2016	Gold Coast Titans	9	1		4
2017	Gold Coast Titans	15	2		8
	Totals	180	54	1	217

== Charity work ==
Zillman posed with teammates Todd Carney and Dane Tilse for the Naked for a Cause 2008-09 calendar for the McGrath Foundation charity.

Studying a Bachelor of Veterinary Science (Honours) at University of Queensland Gatton Campus
