= 2015 Sydney Roosters season =

- NRL Rank: 1st (Minor Premiers)
- Play-off result: Preliminary (Defeated)
- 2015 record: Wins: 18; draws: 0; losses: 6
- Points scored: For: 591; against: 300

Team information
- CEO: Brian Canavan
- Coach: Trent Robinson
- Captain: Jake Friend Mitchell Pearce
- Stadium: Allianz Stadium
- Avg. attendance: 15,661
- High attendance: 35,110

Top scorers
- Tries: Shaun Kenny-Dowall (17)
- Goals: James Maloney (106)
- Points: James Maloney (250)
← 2014	List of seasons	2016 →

The 2015 Sydney Roosters season was the 108th in the club's history. They competed in the 2015 National Rugby League season. The Sydney Roosters opened their 2015 season against the North Queensland Cowboys. In 2015, Trent Robinson coached the Sydney Roosters. Jake Friend and Mitchell Pearce captained the team in 2015 along with two vice-captains in Boyd Cordner and Jared Waerea-Hargreaves. The Sydney Roosters completed their 2015 regular season as Minor Premiers for the third year in a row, defeating the South Sydney Rabbitohs 30 – 0. The Sydney Roosters 2015 season ended in defeat against the Brisbane Broncos 31 – 12.

== 2015 squad ==
Cap	Nat.	Player	Pos.	Sydney Roosters Debut	Previous club
1033	(Australia)	Lopini Paea	PR	9 August 2003	Wakefield Trinity Wildcats
1067	(Australia)	Mitchell Aubusson	SR	19 March 2007
1069	(New Zealand)	Shaun Kenny-Dowall	CE	19 March 2007
1072	(Australia)	Mitchell Pearce (C)	HB	24 March 2007
1083	(Australia)	Jake Friend (C)	HK	27 June 2008
1101	(Australia)	Aidan Guerra	SR	14 March 2010
1105	(New Zealand)	Jared Waerea-Hargreaves (VC)	PR	17 April 2010	Manly-Warringah Sea Eagles
1119	(Australia)	Boyd Cordner (VC)	SR	4 June 2011
1129	(New Zealand)	Roger Tuivasa-Sheck	WG	27 July 2012
1130	(Australia)	Daniel Tupou	WG	18 August 2012
1131	(Australia)	Michael Jennings	CE	7 March 2013	Penrith Panthers
1132	(Australia)	James Maloney	FE	7 March 2013	New Zealand Warriors
1133	(New Zealand)	Sam Moa	PR	7 March 2013	Hull F.C.
1137	(New Zealand)	Isaac Liu	LK	1 April 2013
1138	(Australia)	Dylan Napa	PR	21 June 2013
1139	(Australia)	Samisoni Langi	FE	19 August 2013
1140	(Australia)	Kane Evans	PR	15 March 2014
1144	(Australia)	Brendan Elliot	WG	5 July 2014
1145	(Australia)	Jackson Hastings	HB	4 September 2014
1146	(Australia)	Blake Ferguson	WG	7 March 2015	Canberra Raiders
1147	(New Zealand)	Matt McIlwrick	HK	7 March 2015	Canberra Raiders
1148	(New Zealand)	Sio Siua Taukeiaho	LK	7 March 2015	New Zealand Warriors
1149	(Australia)	Willie Manu	SR	5 April 2015	St Helens R.F.C.
1150	(New Zealand)	Lagi Setu	SR	18 April 2015	Melbourne Storm
1151	(New Zealand)	Suaia Matagi	PR	13 June 2015	New Zealand Warriors
–	(Australia)	Tyler Cornish	HB	Yet to Debut
–	(Australia)	Vincent Leuluai	SR	Yet to Debut
–	(New Zealand)	Abraham Papalii	SR	Yet to Debut
–	(Australia)	Jack Siejka	SR	Yet to Debut
–	(New Zealand)	Omar Slaimankhel	WG	Yet to Debut	New Zealand Warriors
–	(Australia)	Nathan Stapleton	WG	Yet to Debut	Cronulla-Sutherland Sharks

=== Squad movements ===
Gains
Player	Signed From
Blake Ferguson	Deregistered
Martin Kennedy	Brisbane Broncos
Willie Manu	St Helens R.F.C.
Suaia Matagi	New Zealand Warriors
Matt McIlwrick	Canberra Raiders
Lopini Paea	Wakefield Trinity Wildcats
Abraham Papalii	New Zealand Warriors
Lagi Setu	Canberra Raiders

Losses
Player	Signed With
Rémi Casty	Catalans Dragons
Saulala Houma	Cronulla-Sutherland Sharks
Heath L'Estrange	St. George Illawarra Dragons
Nene Macdonald	Gold Coast Titans
Willis Meehan	Deregistered
Anthony Minichiello	Retired
Frank-Paul Nu'uausala	Canberra Raiders
Sonny Bill Williams	Chiefs

== 2015 results ==
=== Auckland Nines ===
Pos	Team	Pld	W	D	L	PF	PA	PD	Pts
1	Cronulla-Sutherland Sharks	3	3	0	0	68	22	+46	6
2	Sydney Roosters	3	2	0	1	30	30	0	4
3	Brisbane Broncos	3	1	0	2	21	37	−16	2
4	Canterbury-Bankstown Bulldogs	3	0	0	3	10	40	−30	0

31 January 2015 Game 7	Sydney Roosters	6 – 4	Brisbane Broncos	Auckland
3:15 PM	Tuivasa-Sheck 18'; Tuivasa-Sheck Goals 1	Statistics	Nicholls 8'	Stadium: Eden Park; Attendance: Unknown; Referee: Alan Shortall

31 January 2015 Game 15	Sydney Roosters	10 – 6	Canterbury-Bankstown Bulldogs	Auckland
7:05 PM	Langi 9'; Elliot 14'; Maloney Goals 1	Statistics	Lane 13'; Graham Goals 1	Stadium: Eden Park; Attendance: Unknown; Referee: Gavin Reynolds

1 February 2015 Game 23	Sydney Roosters	14 – 20	Cronulla-Sutherland Sharks	Auckland
1:40 PM	Taukeiaho 8, 17'; Langi 15'; Hastings Goals 1	Statistics	Leutele 4'; Bird 5'; Sauiluma 10'; Houma 13'; Gardner Goals 2	Stadium: Eden Park; Attendance: Unknown; Referee: Dave Munro

1 February 2015 Game 27	Sydney Roosters	22 – 4	Wests Tigers	Auckland
3:45 PM	Pearce 5, 10'; Stapleton 14'; Maloney 16'; Maloney Goals 3	Statistics	Naiqama 3'	Stadium: Eden Park; Attendance: Unknown; Referee: Ben Cummins

1 February 2015 Game 30	Sydney Roosters	4 – 10	Cronulla-Sutherland Sharks	Auckland
5:50 PM	Tuivasa-Sheck 14'	Statistics	Ayshford 12'; Feki 18'; Holmes Goals 1	Stadium: Eden Park; Attendance: Unknown; Referee: Gavin Badger

=== Pre-season ===
7 February 2015 Game 1	Sydney Roosters / Wyong Roos	8 – 36	Penrith Panthers	Kanwal
6:30 PM	Ferguson 24, 31'; Cornish Goals 0/2	Statistics	Nadrurutalo 12'; Aiono 19, 34'; Fisher-Harris 48'; Murdoch-Masila 56'; Akeripa 72'; Crichton 80'; Davis Goals 3/4; Brackenhoffer Goals 1/1	Stadium: Morry Breen Oval; Attendance: Unknown; Referee: Henry Perenara, Jon Stone

21 February 2015 Game 2	Sydney Roosters	36 – 6	Manly-Warringah Sea Eagles	Gosford
6:30 PM	Pearce 26'; Evans 36'; Tupou 42, 51'; Tuivasa-Sheck 58'; Napa 70'; Maloney Goals 6/6	Statistics	Hiku 11'; Lyon Goals 1/1	Stadium: Central Coast Stadium; Attendance: 3,500; Referee: Gerard Sutton, Gavin Morris

=== Regular season ===
7 March 2015 Round 1	North Queensland Cowboys	4 – 28	Sydney Roosters	Townsville
8:00 PM	O'Neill 69'; Thurston Goals 0/1	Statistics	Tupou 9'; Jennings 21'; Guerra 26'; Cordner 36, 61'; Maloney Goals 4/5	Stadium: 1300SMILES Stadium; Attendance: 17,123; Referee: Jared Maxwell, Chris Sutton

15 March 2015 Round 2	South Sydney Rabbitohs	34 – 26	Sydney Roosters	Sydney
4:00 PM	Walker 5'; Johnston 12, 61'; Burgess 50'; Reddy 69'; Luke 80'; Reynolds Goals 5/6	Statistics	Tupou 21'; Jennings 24, 28'; Napa 43'; Kenny-Dowall 57'; Maloney Goals 3/5	Stadium: ANZ Stadium; Attendance: 27,289; Referee: Matt Cecchin, Henry Perenara

23 March 2015 Round 3	Sydney Roosters	20 – 12	Penrith Panthers	Sydney
7:00 PM	Kenny-Dowall 7'; Ferguson 44, 62'; Maloney Goals 4/4	Statistics	Idris 38'; Segeyaro 66'; Moylan Goals 2/2	Stadium: Allianz Stadium; Attendance: 10,735; Referee: Gerard Sutton, Matt Cecchin

29 March 2015 Round 4	Sydney Roosters	34 – 6	Canberra Raiders	Sydney
2:00 PM	Kenny-Dowall 2'; Tuivasa-Sheck 10'; Ferguson 27'; Jennings 43'; Tupou 48'; Maloney 69'; Maloney Goals 5/6	Statistics	Croker 37'; Croker Goals 1/1	Stadium: Allianz Stadium; Attendance: 9,582; Referee: Adam Devcich, Gavin Reynolds

5 April 2015 Round 5	Sydney Roosters	12 – 20	Cronulla-Sutherland Sharks	Sydney
4:00 PM	Tuivasa-Sheck 66'; Aubusson 70'; Maloney Goals 2/2	Statistics	Bird 30, 74'; Holmes 43'; Lewis 50'; Gordon Goals 2/4	Stadium: Allianz Stadium; Attendance: 12,004; Referee: Ben Cummins, Adam Gee

10 April 2015 Round 6	Brisbane Broncos	22 – 18	Sydney Roosters	Brisbane
7:35 PM	Hunt 6, 84'; Glenn 69'; Parker Goals 5/5	Statistics	Kenny-Dowall 2'; Cordner 28'; Maloney 57'; Maloney Goals 3/3	Stadium: Suncorp Stadium; Attendance: 35,630; Referee: Gerard Sutton, Grant Atkins

18 April 2015 Round 7	Melbourne Storm	17 – 16	Sydney Roosters	Melbourne
7:30 PM	Koroibete 13'; Kaufusi 38'; Chambers 73'; Smith Goals 2/3; Cronk Field Goals 1/1	Statistics	Aubusson 18'; Tupou 75'; Maloney Goals 4/4	Stadium: AAMI Park; Attendance: 12,860; Referee: Ashley Klein, Alan Shortall

25 April 2015 Round 8	Sydney Roosters	12 – 14	St. George Illawarra Dragons	Sydney
4:00 PM	Kenny-Dowall 35'; Tuivasa-Sheck 70'; Maloney Goals 2/2	Statistics	Mata'utia 17'; Rein 25'; Widdop Goals 3/4	Stadium: Allianz Stadium; Attendance: 35,110; Referee: Gerard Sutton, Gavin Reynolds

8 May 2015 Round 9	Sydney Roosters	36 – 4	Wests Tigers	Sydney
7:35 PM	Tupou 4, 30, 62'; Taukeiaho 24'; Cordner 27'; Pearce 68'; Maloney Goals 6/7	Statistics	Halatau 76'; Richards Goals 0/1	Stadium: Allianz Stadium; Attendance: 14,366; Referee: Jared Maxwell, Chris James

15 May 2015 Round 10	Canterbury-Bankstown Bulldogs	10 – 24	Sydney Roosters	Sydney
7:35 PM	Rona 8'; Mbye 77'; Hodkinson Goals 1/2	Statistics	Tupou 34'; Tuivasa-Sheck 38'; Aubusson 62'; Guerra 70'; Maloney Goals 4/5	Stadium: ANZ Stadium; Attendance: 17,093; Referee: Gerard Sutton, Alan Shortall

Round 11	BYE

1 June 2015 Round 12	Sydney Roosters	24 – 2	Melbourne Storm	Sydney
7:00 PM	Kenny-Dowall 2, 63'; Tupou 8'; Aubusson 55'; Maloney Goals 4/7	Statistics	Smith Goals 1/1	Stadium: Allianz Stadium; Attendance: 8,265; Referee: Jared Maxwell, Chris James

7 June 2015 Round 13	Cronulla-Sutherland Sharks	10 – 4	Sydney Roosters	Sydney
4:00 PM	Lewis 46'; Gordon Goals 3/3	Statistics	Maloney 16'; Maloney Goals 0/1	Stadium: Remondis Stadium; Attendance: 14,235; Referee: Ben Cummins, David Munro

13 June 2015 Round 14	New Zealand Warriors	21 – 25	Sydney Roosters	Auckland
8:00 PM	Kata 28, 43'; Lolohea 31'; Vatuvei 35'; Johnson Goals 2/4; Johnson Field Goals 1/1	Statistics	Kenny-Dowall 40'; Elliot 50'; Maloney 72'; Ferguson 80'; Maloney Goals 4/5; Maloney Field Goals 1/1; Tuivasa-Sheck Field Goals 0/1	Stadium: Mt. Smart Stadium; Attendance: 14,167; Referee: Gavin Badger, Gavin Reynolds

22 June 2015 Round 15	St. George Illawarra Dragons	14 – 19	Sydney Roosters	Sydney
7:00 PM	Mata'utia 12'; Widdop 72'; Widdop Goals 3/3	Statistics	Kenny-Dowall 15, 58'; Evans 27'; Maloney Goals 3/4; Friend Field Goals 1/1	Stadium: Allianz Stadium; Attendance: 10,185; Referee: Ben Cummins, Gavin Morris

28 June 2015 Round 16	Sydney Roosters	20 – 10	Gold Coast Titans	Gosford
2:00 PM	Kenny-Dowall 7'; Jennings 29'; Maloney 40'; Maloney Goals 4/4	Statistics	Don 15'; Macdonald 53'; Roberts Goals 1/1; Mortimer Goals 0/1	Stadium: Central Coast Stadium; Attendance: 12,569; Referee: Gavin Morris, Adam Devcich

Round 17	BYE

11 July 2015 Round 18	Penrith Panthers	4 – 24	Sydney Roosters	Sydney
5:30 PM	Brown 66'; Koroisau Goals 0/1	Statistics	Kenny-Dowall 20, 51'; Tuivasa-Sheck 59'; Waerea-Hargreaves 74'; Maloney Goals 4/6	Stadium: Pepper Stadium; Attendance: 13,654; Referee: Ashley Klein, David Munro

19 July 2015 Round 19	Sydney Roosters	24 – 0	New Zealand Warriors	Sydney
2:00 PM	Guerra 22'; Ferguson 26'; Tuivasa-Sheck 32'; Maloney 43'; Maloney Goals 4/4	Statistics		Stadium: Allianz Stadium; Attendance: 16,301; Referee: Matt Cecchin, Grant Atkins

24 July 2015 Round 20	Wests Tigers	8 – 33	Sydney Roosters	Sydney
7:35 PM	Tedesco 26'; Richards 59'; Richards Goals 0/2	Statistics	Tupou 20'; Elliot 45, 79'; Moa 54'; Maloney 63'; Maloney Goals 6/6; Maloney Field Goals 1/1	Stadium: ANZ Stadium; Attendance: 10,186; Referee: Jared Maxwell, Gavin Morris

31 July 2015 Round 21	Sydney Roosters	38 – 28	Canterbury-Bankstown Bulldogs	Sydney
7:45 PM	Tupou 5, 14'; Tuivasa-Sheck 11'; Jennings 24, 75'; Ferguson 69'; Hastings 80'; Maloney Goals 5/7	Statistics	Lane 29'; Morris 33'; Thompson 40, 55'; Hodkinson 51'; Hodkinson Goals 4/5	Stadium: Allianz Stadium; Attendance: 13,589; Referee: Matt Cecchin, Ashley Klein

9 August 2015 Round 22	Newcastle Knights	22 – 38	Sydney Roosters	Newcastle
4:00 PM	Mata'utia 45'; Tapine 61'; Smith 64'; Gidley 70'; Roberts Goals 3/4	Statistics	Tupou 8'; Elliot 13'; Tuivasa-Sheck 31, 35, 41'; Evans 38'; Maloney 76'; Maloney Goals 5/7	Stadium: Hunter Stadium; Attendance: 17,718; Referee: Ashley Klein, Chris James

15 August 2015 Round 23	Sydney Roosters	28 – 18	Parramatta Eels	Sydney
7:30 PM	Maloney 15'; Aubusson 51'; Tuivasa-Sheck 55'; Waerea-Hargreaves 71'; Friend 78'; Maloney Goals 4/5	Statistics	Mannah 11'; Radradra 23'; Norman 31'; Kelly Goals 3/3	Stadium: Allianz Stadium; Attendance: 11,255; Referee: Grant Atkins, Henry Perenara

22 August 2015 Round 24	Sydney Roosters	12 – 10	Brisbane Broncos	Sydney
7:30 PM	Elliot 30'; Cordner 49'; Maloney Goals 2/3	Statistics	Kahu 46'; Oates 61'; Kahu Goals 1/1; Parker Goals 0/1	Stadium: Allianz Stadium; Attendance: 19,137; Referee: Gerard Sutton, Gavin Badger

28 August 2015 Round 25	Manly-Warringah Sea Eagles	10 – 46	Sydney Roosters	Sydney
7:45 PM	Lyon 37'; Symonds 69'; Lyon Goals 1/1; Cherry-Evans Goals 0/1	Statistics	Elliot 9, 17, 43'; Guerra 26'; Tupou 59, 62, 75'; Liu 78'; Maloney Goals 7/8	Stadium: Brookvale Oval; Attendance: 12,911; Referee: Jared Maxwell, Grant Atkins

4 September 2015 Round 26	Sydney Roosters	30 – 0	South Sydney Rabbitohs	Sydney
7:45 PM	Jennings 8'; Ferguson 11'; Cordner 15'; Friend 21'; Guerra 37'; Maloney Goals 5/5; Maloney Field Goals 0/1	Statistics		Stadium: Allianz Stadium; Attendance: 25,019; Referee: Gerard Sutton, Gavin Badger

=== Finals ===
11 September 2015 Qualifying	Sydney Roosters	18 – 20	Melbourne Storm	Sydney
7:55 PM	Taukeiaho 19'; Kenny-Dowall 65'; Ferguson 73'; Maloney Goals 3/4	Statistics	Koroibete 10'; Mann 54'; Glasby 71'; Smith Goals 4/4	Stadium: Allianz Stadium; Attendance: 20,521; Referee: Ben Cummins, Alan Shortall

18 September 2015 Semi-Final	Sydney Roosters	38 – 12	Canterbury-Bankstown Bulldogs	Sydney
7:55 PM	Kenny-Dowall 11, 65, 76'; Evans 51'; Tuivasa-Sheck 54'; Cordner 72'; Maloney Goals 7/7	Statistics	Lafai 27'; Cook 60'; Rona 80'; Lafai Goals 0/1; Mbye Goals 0/1; Browne Goals 0/1	Stadium: Allianz Stadium; Attendance: 35,711; Referee: Matt Cecchin, Ben Cummins

25 September 2015 Preliminary	Sydney Roosters	12 – 31	Brisbane Broncos	Brisbane
7:55 PM	Ferguson 23, 28'; Maloney Goals 2/2	Statistics	Boyd 2'; Hunt 11'; McCullough 19'; Oates 40'; Milford 48'; Reed 59'; Parker Goals 2/4; Kahu Goals 1/2; Milford Field Goals 1/1	Stadium: Suncorp Stadium; Attendance: 51,826; Referee: Gerard Sutton, Gavin Badger

== Ladder ==
2015 NRL season
Pos	Team	Pld	W	D	L	B	PF	PA	PD	Pts
1	Sydney Roosters	24	18	0	6	2	591	300	+291	40
2	Brisbane Broncos	24	17	0	7	2	574	379	+195	38
3	North Queensland Cowboys (P)	24	17	0	7	2	587	454	+133	38
4	Melbourne Storm	24	14	0	10	2	467	348	+119	32
5	Canterbury-Bankstown Bulldogs	24	14	0	10	2	522	480	+42	32
6	Cronulla-Sutherland Sharks	24	14	0	10	2	469	476	−7	32
7	South Sydney Rabbitohs	24	13	0	11	2	465	467	−2	30
8	St. George Illawarra Dragons	24	12	0	12	2	435	408	+27	28
9	Manly-Warringah Sea Eagles	24	11	0	13	2	458	492	−34	26
10	Canberra Raiders	24	10	0	14	2	577	569	+8	24
11	Penrith Panthers	24	9	0	15	2	399	477	−78	22
12	Parramatta Eels	24	9	0	15	2	448	573	−125	22
13	New Zealand Warriors	24	9	0	15	2	445	588	−143	22
14	Gold Coast Titans	24	9	0	15	2	439	636	−197	22
15	Wests Tigers	24	8	0	16	2	487	562	−75	20
16	Newcastle Knights	24	8	0	16	2	458	612	−154	20

== Player statistics ==
Player	Appearances	Tries	Goals	Field Goals	Total Points
Mitchell Aubusson	26	5	–	–	20
Boyd Cordner	25	7	–	–	28
Brendan Elliot	8	8	–	–	32
Kane Evans	26	3	–	–	12
Blake Ferguson	19	10	–	–	40
Jake Friend	22	2	–	1	9
Aidan Guerra	22	5	–	–	20
Jackson Hastings	17	1	–	–	4
Michael Jennings	24	8	–	–	32
Shaun Kenny-Dowall	20	17	–	–	68
Isaac Liu	26	1	–	–	4
Nene Macdonald	4	–	–	–	–
James Maloney	27	9	106	2	250
Willie Manu	4	–	–	–	–
Suaia Matagi	7	–	–	–	–
Matt McIlwrick	8	–	–	–	–
Sam Moa	22	1	–	–	4
Dylan Napa	27	1	–	–	4
Mitchell Pearce	21	1	–	–	4
Lagi Setu	2	–	–	–	–
Sio Siua Taukeiaho	27	2	–	–	8
Roger Tuivasa-Sheck	27	12	–	–	48
Daniel Tupou	27	16	–	–	64
Jared Waerea-Hargreaves	18	2	–	–	8
24	27	111	106	3	659

== Representative honours ==
Player	All Stars	Mid-season (ANZAC Test, Pacific Tests, City vs Country	State of Origin 1	State of Origin 2	State of Origin 3	End of season (Kiwis Tour, RLWC qualifying)
Boyd Cordner			New South Wales	New South Wales	New South Wales	
Kane Evans		City				
Aidan Guerra			Queensland	Queensland	Queensland	
Michael Jennings		Australia	New South Wales	New South Wales	New South Wales	
Shaun Kenny-Dowall		New Zealand				New Zealand
Samisoni Langi		Tonga				
Isaac Liu		Samoa				New Zealand
Nene Macdonald		Papua New Guinea				
James Maloney		Country				
Sam Moa		New Zealand				New Zealand
Mitchell Pearce	NRL All Stars		New South Wales	New South Wales	New South Wales	
Sio Siua Taukeiaho		Tonga				New Zealand
Roger Tuivasa-Sheck		New Zealand				New Zealand
Daniel Tupou		City	New South Wales			
Jared Waerea-Hargreaves	NRL All Stars					
