= 2014 Sydney Roosters season =

- NRL Rank: 1st (Minor Premiers)
- Play-off result: Preliminary (Defeated)
- 2014 record: Wins: 16; draws: 0; losses: 8
- Points scored: For: 615; against: 385

Team information
- CEO: Brian Canavan
- Coach: Trent Robinson
- Captain: Anthony Minichiello
- Stadium: Allianz Stadium
- Avg. attendance: 14,080
- High attendance: 32,481

Top scorers
- Tries: Anthony Minichiello (17)
- Goals: James Maloney (106)
- Points: James Maloney (234)
← 2013	List of seasons	2015 →

The 2014 Sydney Roosters season was the 107th in the club's history. They competed in the 2014 National Rugby League season. The Sydney Roosters opened their 2014 season against their long-time rivals the South Sydney Rabbitohs. In 2014, Trent Robinson coached the Sydney Roosters. Anthony Minichiello captained the team in 2014 along with four vice-captains in Boyd Cordner, Jake Friend, Mitchell Pearce and Jared Waerea-Hargreaves. The Sydney Roosters began 2014 by winning the World Club Challenge defeating the Wigan Warriors 36 – 14. The Sydney Roosters completed their 2014 regular season as Minor Premiers for the second year in a row, defeating the South Sydney Rabbitohs 22 – 18. The Sydney Roosters 2014 season ended in defeat against the South Sydney Rabbitohs 32 – 22.

== 2014 squad ==
Cap	Nat.	Player	Pos.	Sydney Roosters Debut	Previous club
994	(Australia)	Anthony Minichiello (C)	FB	25 February 2000
1038	(Australia)	Heath L'Estrange	HK	9 April 2004	Bradford Bulls
1067	(Australia)	Mitchell Aubusson	SR	19 March 2007
1069	(New Zealand)	Shaun Kenny-Dowall	CE	19 March 2007
1072	(Australia)	Mitchell Pearce (VC)	HB	24 March 2007
1074	(New Zealand)	Frank-Paul Nu'uausala	LK	25 April 2007
1083	(Australia)	Jake Friend (VC)	HK	27 June 2008
1101	(Australia)	Aidan Guerra	SR	14 March 2010
1105	(New Zealand)	Jared Waerea-Hargreaves (VC)	PR	17 April 2010	Manly-Warringah Sea Eagles
1119	(Australia)	Boyd Cordner (VC)	SR	4 June 2011
1129	(New Zealand)	Roger Tuivasa-Sheck	WG	27 July 2012
1130	(Australia)	Daniel Tupou	WG	18 August 2012
1131	(Australia)	Michael Jennings	CE	7 March 2013	Penrith Panthers
1132	(Australia)	James Maloney	FE	7 March 2013	New Zealand Warriors
1133	(New Zealand)	Sam Moa	PR	7 March 2013	Hull F.C.
1134	(New Zealand)	Sonny Bill Williams	SR	7 March 2013	Canterbury-Bankstown Bulldogs
1137	(New Zealand)	Isaac Liu	PR	1 April 2013
1138	(Australia)	Dylan Napa	PR	21 June 2013
1139	(Australia)	Samisoni Langi	FE	19 August 2013
1140	(Australia)	Kane Evans	PR	15 March 2014
1141	(France)	Rémi Casty	PR	23 May 2014	Catalans Dragons
1142	(Australia)	Nene Macdonald	WG	23 May 2014
1143	(Australia)	Willis Meehan	SR	14 June 2014
1144	(Australia)	Brendan Elliot	WG	5 July 2014
1145	(Australia)	Jackson Hastings	HB	4 September 2014
–	(Australia)	Scott Dureau	HB	Yet to Debut	Catalans Dragons
–	(New Zealand)	Saulala Houma	PR	Yet to Debut
–	(New Zealand)	Kurt Kara	HK	Yet to Debut
–	(Australia)	Rhyse Martin	SR	Yet to Debut
–	(Australia)	Jonathon Reuben	WG	Yet to Debut
–	(Australia)	Jack Siejka	SR	Yet to Debut
–	(Australia)	Nathan Stapleton	WG	Yet to Debut	Cronulla-Sutherland Sharks
–	(New Zealand)	Sio Siua Taukeiaho	SR	Yet to Debut	New Zealand Warriors

=== Squad movements ===
Gains
Player	Signed From
Rémi Casty	Catalans Dragons
Scott Dureau	Catalans Dragons
Jackson Hastings	St. George Illawarra Dragons
Heath L'Estrange	Bradford Bulls
Jonathon Reuben	Canberra Raiders
Kem Seru	St. George Illawarra Dragons

Losses
Player	Signed With
Josh Ailaomai	St. George Illawarra Dragons
Tinirau Arona	Cronulla-Sutherland Sharks
Adam Henry	Bradford Bulls
Martin Kennedy	Brisbane Broncos
Tautau Moga	North Queensland Cowboys
Daniel Mortimer	Gold Coast Titans
Luke O'Donnell	Retired
Michael Oldfield	Catalans Dragons

== 2014 results ==
=== Auckland Nines ===
Pos	Team	Pld	W	D	L	PF	PA	PD	Pts
1	Parramatta Eels	3	2	0	1	55	32	+23	4
2	Brisbane Broncos	3	2	0	1	42	32	+10	4
3	Sydney Roosters	3	1	0	2	29	41	−12	2
4	Canterbury Bulldogs	3	1	0	2	26	46	−20	2

15 February 2014 Game 3	Sydney Roosters	11 – 18	Parramatta Eels	Auckland
1:25 pm	Pearce 8'; Tupou 9'; Pearce Goals 1	Statistics	Radradra 4, 5, 13'; Toutai 11'; Sandow Goals 1	Stadium: Eden Park; Attendance: 44,500; Referee: Brett Suttor

15 February 2014 Game 11	Sydney Roosters	14 – 7	Brisbane Broncos	Auckland
5:10 pm	Fittler 5'; Pearce 9'; Pearce Goals 1 Friend Goals 1	Statistics	Parker 14'; Hunt Goals 1	Stadium: Eden Park; Attendance: 44,500; Referee: Jared Maxwell

16 February 2014 Game 19	Sydney Roosters	4 – 16	Canterbury-Bankstown Bulldogs	Auckland
12:50 pm	Rokolati 18'	Statistics	Jackson 3'; O'Hanlon 8, 16'; Low 10'	Stadium: Eden Park; Attendance: 44,500; Referee: Matt Cecchin

=== Pre-season ===
15 February 2014 Game 1	Sydney Roosters / Newtown Jets	32 – 4	Newcastle Knights	Kanwal
6:30 pm	Maloney 9'; Aubusson 14'; Cordner ?'; Meehan ?'; Waerea-Hargreaves ?'; Elliot ?'; Maloney Goals 3/? Mortimer Goals 1/?		Mantellato ?'; Unknown Goals 0/1	Stadium: Morrie Breen Oval; Attendance: 2,000; Referee: Ashley Klein, Matt Noyen

22 February 2014 Game 2	Sydney Roosters	36 – 14	Wigan Warriors	Sydney
8:00 pm	Jennings 3, 22, 47'; Moa 13'; Waerea-Hargreaves 67'; Kenny-Dowall 71'; Maloney Goals 6/6	Statistics	Burgess 44'; Charnley 52, 59'; Smith Goals 1/3	Stadium: Allianz Stadium; Attendance: 31,515; Referee: Ben Cummins, Gerard Sutton

=== Regular season ===
6 March 2014 Round 1	South Sydney Rabbitohs	28 – 8	Sydney Roosters	Sydney
8:05 pm	Inglis 22, 51, 77'; Goodwin 74'; Reynolds Goals 6/6	Statistics	Jennings 10'; Maloney Goals 2/2	Stadium: ANZ Stadium; Attendance: 27,282; Referee: Ben Cummins, Luke Phillips

15 March 2014 Round 2	Sydney Roosters	56 – 4	Parramatta Eels	Sydney
7:30 pm	Minichiello 6, 20, 63'; Moa 10'; Tuivasa-Sheck 42, 48'; Aubusson 46, 76'; Tupou 55'; Cordner 66'; Maloney Goals 8/10	Statistics	Radradra 32'; Norman Goals 0/1	Stadium: Allianz Stadium; Attendance: 13,269; Referee: Gavin Badger, Brett Suttor

21 March 2014 Round 3	Brisbane Broncos	26 – 30	Sydney Roosters	Brisbane
7:40 pm	Hunt 6, 72'; Thaiday 22'; Maranta 55'; Reed 68'; Parker Goals 3/6	Statistics	Jennings 8'; Moa 14'; Kenny-Dowall 60'; Tuivasa-Sheck 75'; Cordner 78'; Maloney Goals 5/5	Stadium: Suncorp Stadium; Attendance: 33,381; Referee: Shayne Hayne, Chris James

28 March 2014 Round 4	Sydney Roosters	0 – 8	Manly-Warringah Sea Eagles	Sydney
7:40 pm		Statistics	Blair 25'; Lyon Goals 2/3	Stadium: Allianz Stadium; Attendance: 14,902; Referee: Ben Cummins, Gavin Reynolds

4 April 2014 Round 5	Sydney Roosters	8 – 9	Canterbury-Bankstown Bulldogs	Sydney
7:40 pm	Jennings 32'; Maloney Goals 2/2	Statistics	Stanley 11'; Hodkinson Goals 2/2; Reynolds Field Goals 1/1	Stadium: Allianz Stadium; Attendance: 12,584; Referee: Shayne Hayne, Henry Perenara

12 April 2014 Round 6	Parramatta Eels	14 – 12	Sydney Roosters	Sydney
5:30 pm	Sio 6, 25'; Radradra 44'; Sandow Goals 1/3	Statistics	Moa 15'; Tupou 35'; Maloney Goals 2/2	Stadium: Pirtek Stadium; Attendance: 15,312; Referee: Gerard Sutton, David Munro

19 April 2014 Round 7	Cronulla-Sutherland Sharks	18 – 24	Sydney Roosters	Sydney
7:30 pm	Leutele 12'; Graham 42'; Feki 67'; Gordon Goals 3/3	Statistics	Cordner 18'; Maloney 23'; Kenny-Dowall 60, 71'; Maloney Goals 4/4	Stadium: Remondis Stadium; Attendance: 12,163; Referee: Henry Perenara, Alan Shortall

25 April 2014 Round 8	St. George Illawarra Dragons	14 – 34	Sydney Roosters	Sydney
4:00 pm	Creagh 25'; Green 39'; Beale 61'; Widdop Goals 1/3	Statistics	Guerra 9'; Tupou 16'; Minichiello 35'; Friend 42'; Cordner 68'; Kenny-Dowall 74'; Maloney Goals 5/5	Stadium: Allianz Stadium; Attendance: 38,784; Referee: Shayne Hayne, Gavin Morris

9 May 2014 Round 9	Sydney Roosters	30 – 6	Wests Tigers	Sydney
7:40 pm	Tupou 10, 40'; Jennings 35, 45'; Cordner 59'; Pearce 73'; Maloney Goals 3/6	Statistics	Lawrence 69'; Austin Goals 1/1	Stadium: Allianz Stadium; Attendance: 16,024; Referee: Matt Cecchin, Chris James

17 May 2014 Round 10	North Queensland Cowboys	42 – 10	Sydney Roosters	Townsville
7:30 pm	Linnett 2, 16, 71'; Sims 12'; Thurston 34'; Wright 40'; Tate 60'; Thurston Goals 7/9	Statistics	Minichiello 20'; Mortimer 79'; Maloney Goals 1/2	Stadium: 1300SMILES Stadium; Attendance: 15,361; Referee: Shayne Hayne, Adam Gee

23 May 2014 Round 11	Canterbury-Bankstown Bulldogs	12 – 32	Sydney Roosters	Sydney
7:45 pm	Brown 27, 57'; Inu Goals 2/3	Statistics	Macdonald 17'; Williams 22, 68'; Minichiello 48, 71'; Kenny-Dowall 64'; Maloney Goals 4/6	Stadium: ANZ Stadium; Attendance: 19,088; Referee: Ashley Klein, Adam Gee

31 May 2014 Round 12	Sydney Roosters	26 – 12	Canberra Raiders	Sydney
5:30 pm	Tupou 9, 19, 57'; Maloney 33'; Maloney Goals 5/5	Statistics	Wighton 66'; Vaughan 74'; Croker Goals 2/2	Stadium: Allianz Stadium; Attendance: 11,815; Referee: Gerard Sutton, Jared Maxwell

8 June 2014 Round 13	Melbourne Storm	12 – 32	Sydney Roosters	Melbourne
3:00 pm	Fonua 49'; Mann 68'; Smith Goals 2/2	Statistics	Minichiello 7, 79'; Pearce 30'; Casty 38'; Tuivasa-Sheck 53'; Williams 60'; Maloney Goals 4/6	Stadium: AAMI Park; Attendance: 16,757; Referee: Shayne Hayne, Henry Perenara

14 June 2014 Round 14	Sydney Roosters	29 – 12	Newcastle Knights	Sydney
7:30 pm	Tuivasa-Sheck 17, 50'; Kenny-Dowall 55'; Friend 61'; Liu 78'; Maloney Goals 4/5; Maloney Field Goals 1/1	Statistics	Smith 7'; Mamo 38'; Roberts Goals 2/2	Stadium: Allianz Stadium; Attendance: 9,847; Referee: Gavin Badger, Gavind Reynolds

Round 15	BYE

27 June 2014 Round 16	Manly-Warringah Sea Eagles	24 – 16	Sydney Roosters	Sydney
7:40 pm	Hiku 13, 78'; Taufua 18'; Stewart 52'; Lyon Goals 4/5	Statistics	Kenny-Dowall 23'; Cordner 32'; Pearce 68'; Maloney Goals 2/3	Stadium: Brookvale Oval; Attendance: 17,155; Referee: Shayne Hayne, Gavin Morris

5 July 2014 Round 17	Sydney Roosters	28 – 30	Cronulla-Sutherland Sharks	Sydney
7:30 pm	Aubusson 6, 57'; Pearce 8'; Kenny-Dowall 15'; Elliot 31'; Maloney Goals 4/5	Statistics	Graham 37'; Gagan 43, 73'; Feki 51'; Robson 78'; Gordon Goals 5/5	Stadium: Allianz Stadium; Attendance: 10,732; Referee: Gavin Morris, Henry Perenara

Round 18	BYE

19 July 2014 Round 19	Sydney Roosters	32 – 12	Penrith Panthers	Sydney
3:00 pm	Guerra 6'; Aubusson 17'; Casty 35'; Cordner 71, 77'; Maloney Goals 6/6	Statistics	Cartwright 58'; Segeyaro 75'; Soward Goals 2/2	Stadium: Allianz Stadium; Attendance: 13,993; Referee: Ashley Klein, Adam Gee

25 July 2014 Round 20	Newcastle Knights	16 – 12	Sydney Roosters	Newcastle
7:40 pm	Roberts 60, 64'; Leilua 79'; Gagai Goals 1/2; Roberts Goals 1/1	Statistics	Minichiello 2'; Nu'uausala 72'; Maloney Goals 2/2	Stadium: Hunter Stadium; Attendance: 15,468; Referee: Gavin Badger, Grant Atkins

2 August 2014 Round 21	Sydney Roosters	30 – 22	St. George Illawarra Dragons	Sydney
7:30 pm	Jennings 10, 61'; Macdonald 33'; Guerra 46'; Friend 73'; Maloney Goals 5/5	Statistics	Morris 14'; Thompson 23'; Marshall 70'; Dugan 78'; Widdop Goals 3/4	Stadium: Allianz Stadium; Attendance: 13,083; Referee: Shayne Hayne, Grant Atkins

11 August 2014 Round 22	Sydney Roosters	26 – 18	Gold Coast Titans	Sydney
7:00 pm	Minichiello 7'; Maloney 20'; Macdonald 33'; Tuivasa-Sheck 49'; Jennings 69'; Maloney Goals 3/6	Statistics	Don 3'; Taylor 28'; Bird 40'; Sezer Goals 3/3	Stadium: Allianz Stadium; Attendance: 6,345; Referee: Matt Cecchin, Henry Perenara

16 August 2014 Round 23	Wests Tigers	4 – 48	Sydney Roosters	Sydney
7:30 pm	Hitchcox 70'	Statistics	Jennings 3'; Moa 44'; Minichiello 48, 50'; Waerea-Hargreaves 59'; Kenny-Dowall 61'; Tupou 64'; Pearce 79'; Maloney Goals 8/9	Stadium: Leichhardt Oval; Attendance: 5,297; Referee: Gavin Badger, Chris Butler

24 August 2014 Round 24	New Zealand Warriors	12 – 46	Sydney Roosters	Auckland
2:00 pm	Tomkins 11'; Laumape 76'; Johnson Goals 2/2	Statistics	Guerra 4'; Jennings 21, 78'; Kenny-Dowall 35'; Minichiello 41'; Moa 48'; Liu 52'; Cordner 63'; Maloney Goals 7/8	Stadium: Mt. Smart Stadium; Attendance: 19,676; Referee: David Munro, Chris Sutton

30 August 2014 Round 25	Sydney Roosters	24 – 12	Melbourne Storm	Sydney
7:30 pm	Tupou 4, 79'; Pearce 64'; Guerra 74'; Maloney Goals 4/5	Statistics	Slater 20, 45'; Smith Goals 2/2	Stadium: Allianz Stadium; Attendance: 13,879; Referee: Jared Maxwell, Gavin Morris

4 September 2014 Round 26	Sydney Roosters	22 – 18	South Sydney Rabbitohs	Sydney
7:45 pm	Tupou 18'; Minichiello 45'; Maloney 50'; Maloney Goals 5/5	Statistics	Walker 65'; Johnston 70'; Tuqiri 75'; Luke Goals 3/4	Stadium: Allianz Stadium; Attendance: 32,481; Referee: Matt Cecchin, Gavin Morris

=== Finals ===
13 September 2014 Qualifying	Sydney Roosters	18 – 19	Penrith Panthers	Sydney
5:50 pm	Jennings 31'; Kenny-Dowall 45'; Pearce 74'; Maloney Goals 3/3	Statistics	Mansour 25'; Whare 52, 77'; Soward Goals 3/4; Soward Field Goals 1/1	Stadium: Allianz Stadium; Attendance: 23,449; Referee: Jared Maxwell, Henry Perenara

19 September 2014 Semi-Final	Sydney Roosters	31 – 30	North Queensland Cowboys	Sydney
7:55 pm	Pearce 3'; Tupou 16, 26'; Jennings 21'; Maloney 31'; Maloney Goals 5/6; Maloney Field Goals 1/1	Statistics	Lowe 35'; Cooper 38'; Thurston 46'; Lui 50'; Scott 56'; Thurston Goals 5/5	Stadium: Allianz Stadium; Attendance: 18,355; Referee: Shayne Hayne, Gavin Badger

26 September 2014 Preliminary	Sydney Roosters	22 – 32	South Sydney Rabbitohs	Sydney
7:55 pm	Pearce 5'; Minichiello 8, 80'; Guerra 79'; Maloney Goals 3/4	Statistics	Tuqiri 20'; Johnston 30'; Te'o 44'; Inglis 52, 65'; Reynolds Goals 6/6	Stadium: ANZ Stadium; Attendance: 52,592; Referee: Gerard Sutton, Ben Cummins

== Ladder ==
2014 NRL season
Pos	Team	Pld	W	D	L	B	PF	PA	PD	Pts
1	Sydney Roosters	24	16	0	8	2	615	385	+230	36
2	Manly Warringah Sea Eagles	24	16	0	8	2	502	399	+103	36
3	South Sydney Rabbitohs (P)	24	15	0	9	2	585	361	+224	34
4	Penrith Panthers	24	15	0	9	2	506	426	+80	34
5	North Queensland Cowboys	24	14	0	10	2	596	406	+190	32
6	Melbourne Storm	24	14	0	10	2	536	460	+76	32
7	Canterbury-Bankstown Bulldogs	24	13	0	11	2	446	439	+7	30
8	Brisbane Broncos	24	12	0	12	2	549	456	+93	28
9	New Zealand Warriors	24	12	0	12	2	571	491	+80	28
10	Parramatta Eels	24	12	0	12	2	477	580	−103	28
11	St. George Illawarra Dragons	24	11	0	13	2	469	528	−59	26
12	Newcastle Knights	24	10	0	14	2	463	571	−108	24
13	Wests Tigers	24	10	0	14	2	420	631	−211	24
14	Gold Coast Titans	24	9	0	15	2	372	538	−166	22
15	Canberra Raiders	24	8	0	16	2	466	623	−157	20
16	Cronulla-Sutherland Sharks	24	5	0	19	2	334	613	−279	14

== Player statistics ==
Player	Appearances	Tries	Goals	Field Goals	Total Points
Mitchell Aubusson	26	5	–	–	20
Rémi Casty	11	2	–	–	8
Boyd Cordner	22	9	–	–	36
Brendan Elliot	1	1	–	–	4
Kane Evans	9	–	–	–	–
Jake Friend	23	3	–	–	12
Aidan Guerra	23	6	–	–	24
Jackson Hastings	2	–	–	–	–
Michael Jennings	21	13	–	–	52
Shaun Kenny-Dowall	27	11	–	–	44
Samisoni Langi	1	–	–	–	–
Heath L'Estrange	5	–	–	–	–
Isaac Liu	23	2	–	–	8
Nene Macdonald	7	3	–	–	12
James Maloney	27	5	106	2	234
Willis Meehan	1	–	–	–	–
Anthony Minichiello	27	17	–	–	68
Sam Moa	27	5	–	–	20
Daniel Mortimer	8	1	–	–	4
Dylan Napa	25	–	–	–	–
Frank-Paul Nu'uausala	26	1	–	–	4
Mitchell Pearce	26	9	–	–	36
Roger Tuivasa-Sheck	26	6	–	–	24
Daniel Tupou	19	14	–	–	56
Jared Waerea-Hargreaves	26	1	–	–	4
Sonny Bill Williams	21	2	–	–	8
26	27	118	106	2	686

== Representative honours ==
Player	ANZAC Test	Pacific Test	City / Country	State of Origin 1	State of Origin 2	State of Origin 3	Four Nations
Boyd Cordner	Australia					New South Wales	Australia
Kane Evans		Fiji					
Aidan Guerra				Queensland	Queensland	Queensland	Australia
Michael Jennings				New South Wales	New South Wales		Australia
Shaun Kenny-Dowall							New Zealand
Isaac Liu		Samoa					Samoa
Sam Moa	New Zealand						
Roger Tuivasa-Sheck	New Zealand						
Daniel Tupou			City	New South Wales	New South Wales	New South Wales	Australia
