= Roger Tuivasa-Sheck =

New Zealand and Samoa international dual-code rugby player

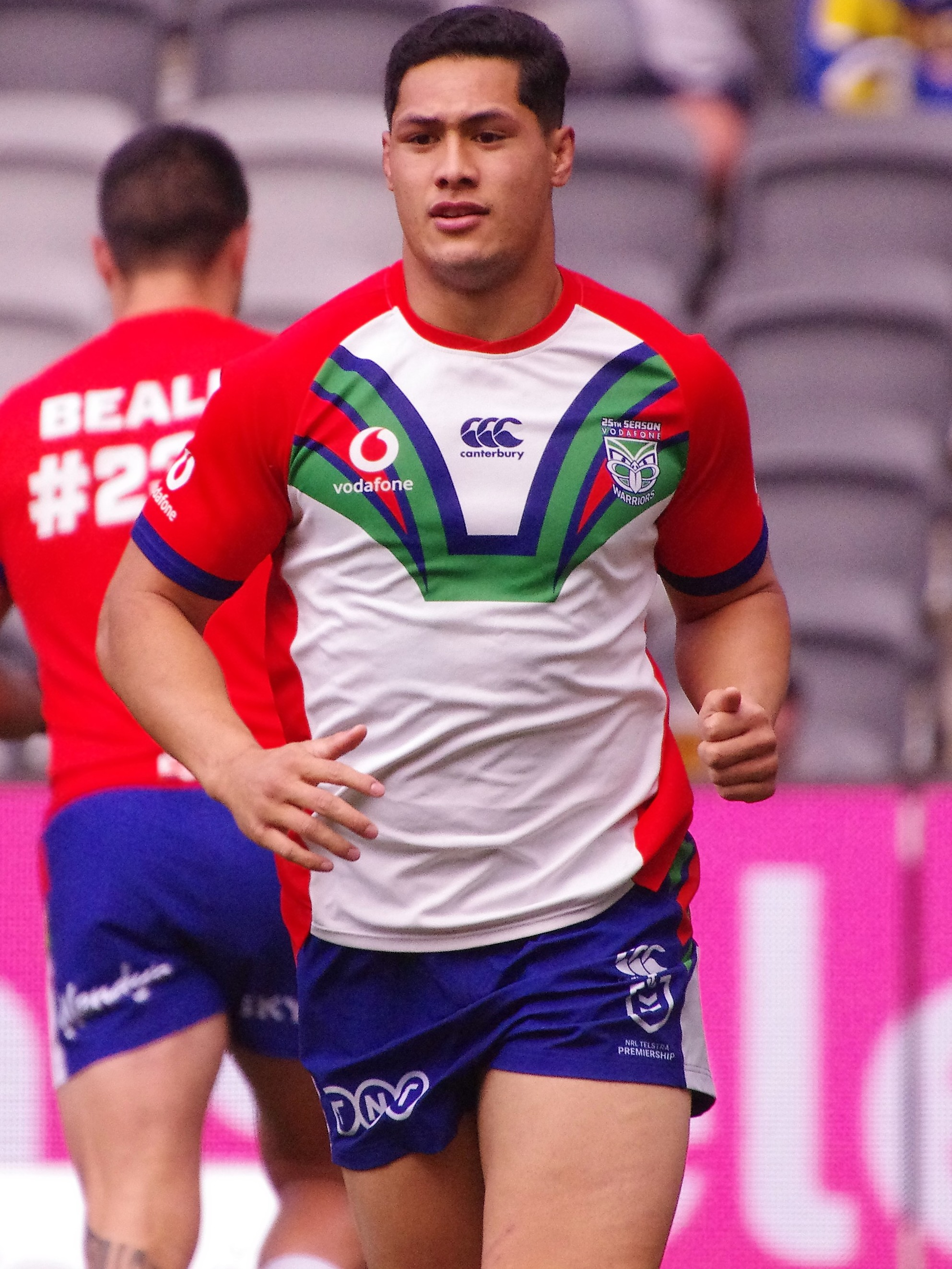

Personal information
- Full name: Roger Tuivasa-Sheck
- Born: 5 June 1993 (age 33) Apia, Samoa
- Height: 182 cm (6 ft 0 in)
- Weight: 99 kg (15 st 8 lb)

Playing information

Rugby league
- Position: Fullback, Wing, Centre
Club
Years	Team	Pld	T	G	FG	P
2012–15	Sydney Roosters	84	28	0	0	112
2016–21	New Zealand Warriors	111	30	1	0	122
2024–26	New Zealand Warriors	47	19	1	0	78
2027–	Wakefield Trinity	0	0	0	0	0
	Total	242	77	2	0	312
Representative
Years	Team	Pld	T	G	FG	P
2013–19	New Zealand	20	14	0	0	56
2024–25	Samoa	5	0	0	0	0

Rugby union
- Position: Centre
Club
Years	Team	Pld	T	G	FG	P
2022–23	Blues	18	2	0	0	10
2022–23	Auckland	15	2	0	0	10
	Total	33	4	0	0	20
Representative
Years	Team	Pld	T	G	FG	P
2022–23	New Zealand	3	0	0	0	0
2022	All Blacks XV	1	0	0	0	0
- Source: As of 22 November 2026

Roger Tuivasa-Sheck (born 5 June 1993) is a professional dual-code rugby international footballer from New Zealand who plays as a winger or fullback for Wakefield Trinity in the Super League and Samoa at international level.

He previously played for the Warriors as captain and fullback, becoming their first player to win the Dally M Medal in 2018. He also played for the Sydney Roosters, with whom he won a premiership in 2013 playing wing. He played for the Auckland Blues in Super Rugby as a centre. He has represented both the All Blacks and Kiwis at international level.

== Background ==
Tuivasa-Sheck was born in Apia, Samoa. He attended Otahuhu College in Auckland, where he played both rugby union and rugby league. Tuivasa-Sheck represented the New Zealand rugby union schoolboy team and captained Otahuhu College at the New Zealand Rugby League's Secondary Schools tournament in 2011 before being signed by the Sydney Roosters in October of that year.

Tuivasa-Sheck is the older brother of Johnny Tuivasa-Sheck who played for the Roosters premiership-winning Under 20s & reserve grade sides before joining Roger at the Warriors & turning out for the NZ club's reserve grade side.

== Playing career ==
=== Sydney Roosters (2012–2015) ===
Toyota Cup Winger of the Year, First-grade and Junior Kiwis debut (2012)

Tuivasa-Sheck played for the Roosters' NYC team in 2012 and scored 9 tries in 12 games before moving on to their New South Wales Cup reserve-grade team.

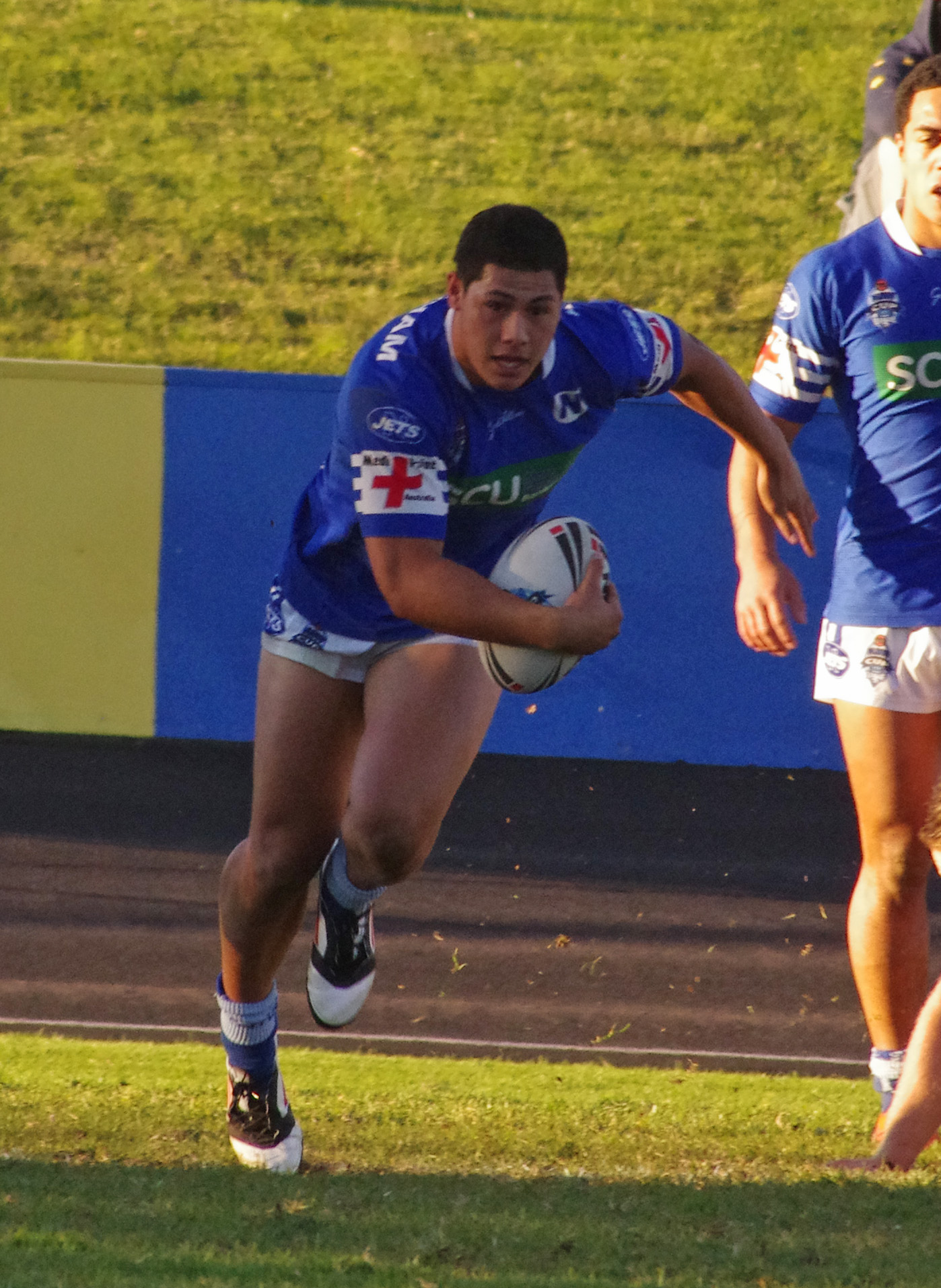
Tuivasa-Sheck playing for the Newtown Jets in 2012

In round 21 of the 2012 NRL season, Tuivasa-Sheck made his NRL debut on the wing in the Roosters' 36–16 loss against the Gold Coast Titans at the SFS. Tuivasa-Sheck finished his debut year with 6 matches. He was named at wing in the 2012 Toyota Cup Team of the Year. In September, Tuivasa-Sheck was featured in an article listing the top ten upcoming talents of the NRL.

On 2 October, Tuivasa-Sheck was named in the Junior Kiwis team to face the Junior Kangaroos. He was named the New Zealand Rugby League's 2012 Junior of the Year. On 21 December, Tuivasa-Sheck extended his contract for a further three years, keeping him at the Roosters till the end of the 2015 season.

Dally M Winger of the Year en route to the premiership, and representative Kiwis debut (2013)

In round 4, against Parramatta Eels at the SFS, Tuivasa-Sheck scored his first tries in first grade completing a hat-trick in the Roosters' 50–0 win. On 1 October, he was named Winger of the Year at the Dally M Awards. On 6 October 2013, Tuivasa-Sheck was part of the team that beat the Manly-Warringah Sea Eagles 26–18 for the 2013 NRL Premiership. Tuivasa-Sheck played in 25 matches and scored 9 tries for the Roosters in the 2013.

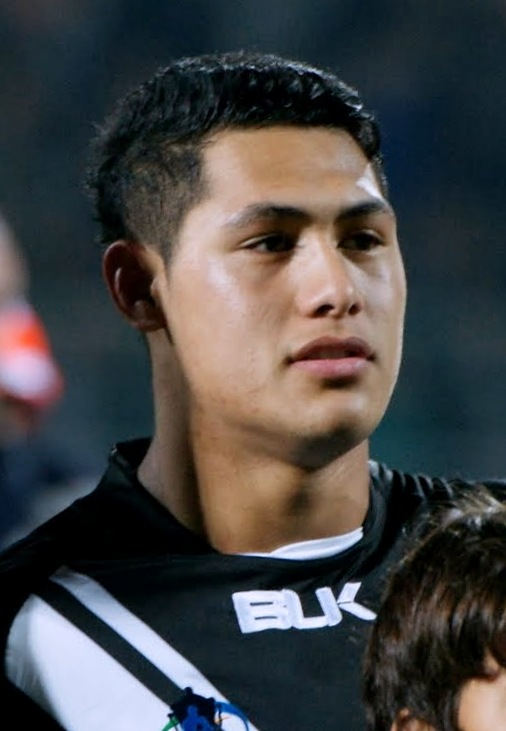
RTS playing for the Kiwis at the RLWC in 2013

Playing for the Kiwis in the 2013 Rugby League World Cup, Tuivasa-Sheck made his international debut against Samoa in the 42–24 win at Halliwell Jones Stadium. In the final, against Australia, he injured his leg early in the match and the Kiwis lost 2–34 at Old Trafford. Tuivasa-Sheck played 6 matches and scored 8 tries in the tournament.

Becoming one of rugby league’s young superstars (2014)

Tuivasa-Sheck played on the wing for New Zealand in the 2014 Anzac Test, with the Kiwis losing 30–18. He finished the 2014 NRL season with 7 tries from 26 matches.

Dally M Fullback of the Year (2015)

In the pre-season, Tuivasa-Sheck played for the Roosters in the Auckland Nines. Tuivasa-Sheck was named the fullback for the Roosters going forward, replacing Anthony Minichiello due to his retirement. On 8 April, he signed a 3-year contract with the New Zealand Warriors starting in 2016, replacing the departing Sam Tomkins. On 3 May, he played for the Kiwis at fullback in their historic 2015 Anzac Test victory over Australia. It was only the Kiwis' second win in the 15 editions of the annual test-match since its introduction in 1997.

During the season, Tuivasa-Sheck ran a combined 5767 metres. On 29 September, he was named the 2015 Dally M Fullback of the Year, finishing his last year with the Roosters having played in all of their 27 matches and scoring 12 tries. He returned to the Kiwis side at the end of the year to play in their tour of Great Britain. He played in all 3 matches and scored 1 try against England in the Kiwis' 2–1 Baskerville Shield series loss.

=== New Zealand Warriors (2016–2021) ===
Homecoming riddled by season-ending injury (2016)

In February, Tuivasa-Sheck played for the Warriors in the Auckland Nines. In Round 1 of the season, he made his club debut for the Warriors against the Wests Tigers, playing at fullback in the Warriors' 26–34 loss at Campbelltown Stadium. In round five, in his first game against his old club the Roosters, he combined with Tuimoala Lolohea to score the match-winning try that gave the Warriors a 32–28 victory in golden point. In Round 7 against the Canterbury-Bankstown Bulldogs, he suffered a season ending anterior cruciate ligament (ACL) knee injury. This meant he finished the 2016 season having played in 7 matches and scoring 1 try for the Warriors.

Appointment as captain of the Warriors (2017)

On 1 February, new coach Stephen Kearney named Tuivasa-Sheck as the Warriors new captain.

Dally M Player of the Year and Warriors’ return to the finals (2018)

On 36 September, Tuivasa-Sheck was named "Fullback of The Year" and the "Dally M" Medalist of the Year at the 2018 Dally M Awards. He became the first New Zealand Warriors player to receive this honour. Tuivasa-Sheck finished the season scoring 3 tries and playing in 23 games for the Warriors, but suffered a season-ending injury early in the Week 1 Finals loss to the Penrith Panthers.

Golden Boot winner (2019)

Tuivasa-Sheck made 23 appearances scoring 7 tries in the 2019 NRL season as New Zealand finished 13th and missed out on the finals. Tuivasa-Sheck finished 5th in the Dally M Medal voting. Later that year Tuivasa-Sheck was awarded the Rugby League World Golden Boot Award for the best international player of the year.

Permanent move to Australia; Dally M Captain of the Year (2020)

In round 16 of the 2020 NRL season, he scored two tries in a 36–6 victory over Newcastle at Scully Park in Tamworth.

He made a total of 18 appearances for New Zealand in the 2020 NRL season as the club missed out on the finals.

Final season and subsequent return to New Zealand (2021)

On 30 January, it was announced that he would be leaving the New Zealand Warriors and the National Rugby League itself, at the end of the 2021 season, to sign a contract with the New Zealand Rugby Union in a bid to play for the All Blacks (New Zealand National Rugby Team). On 6 February, Tuivasa-Sheck signed a two-year contract with the Blues from the 2022 season, and will also play for Auckland in the Mitre 10 Cup.

On 26 July, it was announced that Tuivasa-Sheck would leave the club immediately to go home to New Zealand before the Trans-Tasman travel bubble was closed. He played in 17 games for the Warriors in the 2021 NRL season.

=== Switch to rugby union; Auckland Blues (2022–23) ===
Transition to rugby union, Super Rugby and All Blacks test debut (2022)

Tuivasa-Sheck made his first-grade rugby union debut for the Blues in February, against the Hurricanes. Tuivasa-Sheck finished the 2022 Super Rugby Pacific season playing in 11 games for the Blues including the Blues’ final loss to the Crusaders. He was named in the All Blacks squad for their test series against Ireland and debuted on 16 July 2022 at Wellington. He made his debut for Auckland in the 2022 Bunnings NPC competition later in the year.

Final season in rugby union (2023)

On 20 April 2023, Tuivasa-Sheck confirmed he will be returning to the New Zealand Warriors on a three-year deal beginning in 2024. Later that year Tuivasa-Sheck revealed on The Morning Shift Podcast that in his return to the club that he will go in as a centre, rather than his traditional position of fullback.

Tuivasa-Sheck finished the 2023 Super Rugby Pacific season playing in seven games, as he missed out on selection for the All Blacks’ squad for the 2023 Rugby World Cup. He started at fullback for Auckland in the 2023 Bunnings NPC.

=== Return to rugby league; New Zealand Warriors (2024–26) ===
Tuivasa-Sheck made 18 appearances for the New Zealand Warriors in the 2024 NRL season and scored five tries which saw the club finish 13th on the table. On 27 March 2025, it was announced that Tuivasa-Sheck would be ruled out for at least eight weeks with a hamstring injury. He played 19 matches with New Zealand in the 2025 NRL season as the club finished 6th on the table and qualified for the finals. They were eliminated by Penrith in the first week of the finals. On 23 May 2026, in a 30–12 win against the St George Illawarra Dragons, Tuivasa-Sheck suffered an ACL injury which ruled him out for the remainder of the Warriors' 2026 season.

=== Wakefield Trinity (2027–) ===
In March 2026, Wakefield Trinity of the Super League confirmed they had signed Tuivasa-Sheck on a two-year deal starting in 2027.

== Statistics ==
Year	Team	Games	Tries	Goals	Pts
2012	Sydney Roosters	6			
2013	Sydney Roosters	25	9		36
2014	Sydney Roosters	26	7		28
2015	Sydney Roosters	27	12		48
2016	New Zealand Warriors	7	1		4
2017	New Zealand Warriors	23	10		40
2018	New Zealand Warriors	23	3		12
2019	New Zealand Warriors	23	7		28
2020	New Zealand Warriors	18	5	1	22
2021	New Zealand Warriors	17	4		16
2024	New Zealand Warriors	18	5		20
2025	New Zealand Warriors	19	12		48
2026	New Zealand Warriors	10	2	1	10
2027	Wakefield Trinity				
	Totals	242	77	2	312

== Personal life ==
In May 2015, Tuivasa-Sheck was first to the scene where a car crashed into a house near his home in the Sydney suburb of Botany. He rescued a man from the car, and stayed with the occupants of the house in question until medical services were able to arrive.

Tuivasa-Sheck was convicted of drink-driving in October 2023 after he was caught with excess breath alcohol at a routine police checkpoint in the early hours of 10 September. He had been drinking with teammates at SkyCity Auckland the night before and thought he was sober enough to drive. He was fined $600 and disqualified from driving for six months.
