= James Maloney (rugby league) =

Australia international rugby league footballer

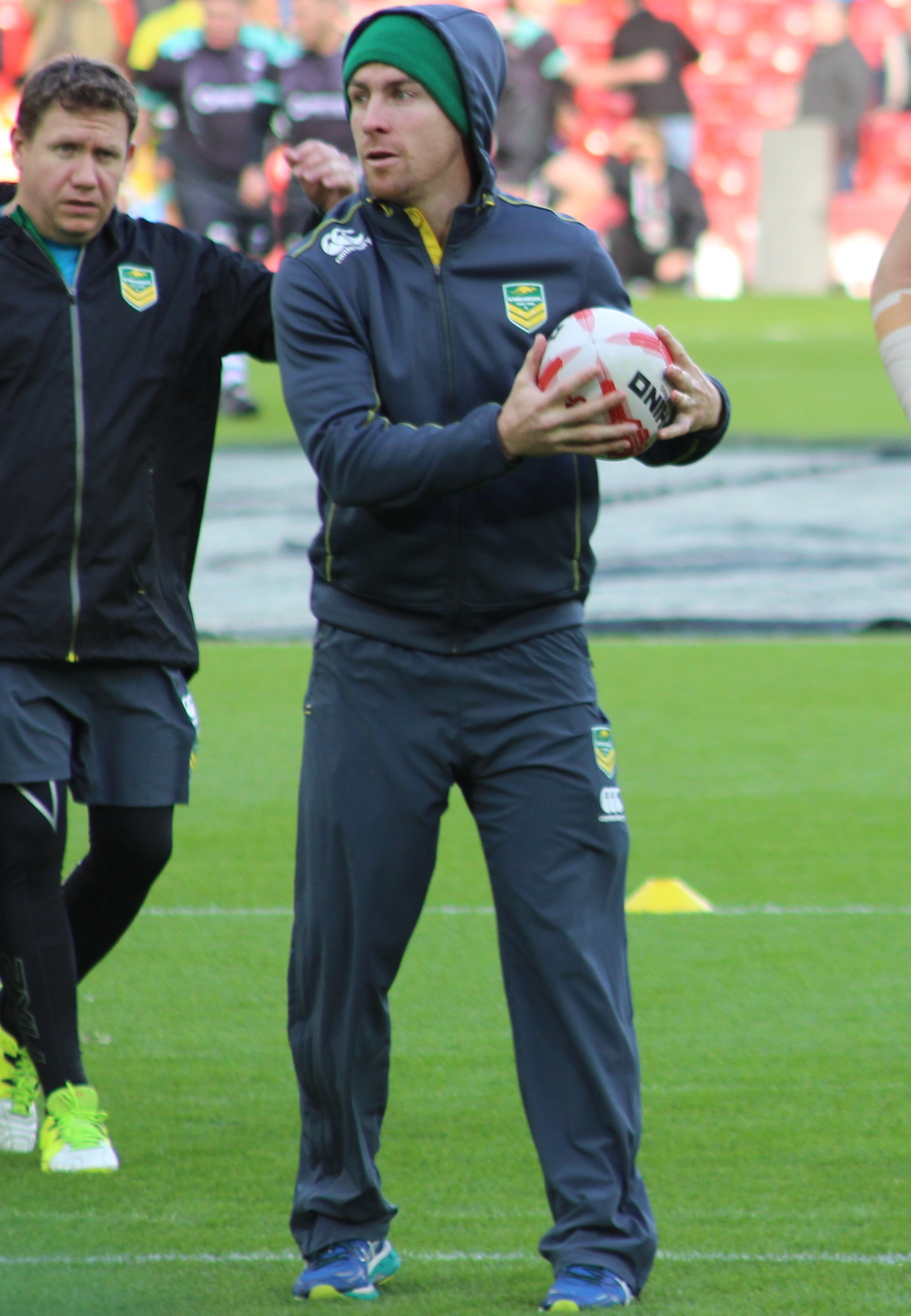

Personal information
- Full name: James Maloney
- Born: 15 June 1986 (age 40) Orange, New South Wales, Australia
- Height: 5 ft 9 in (1.76 m)
- Weight: 13 st 1 lb (83 kg)

Playing information
- Position: Five-eighth, Halfback
Club
Years	Team	Pld	T	G	FG	P
2009	Melbourne Storm	4	0	0	0	0
2010–12	New Zealand Warriors	75	24	222	7	547
2013–15	Sydney Roosters	80	23	326	4	748
2016–17	Cronulla Sharks	46	11	166	6	382
2018–19	Penrith Panthers	44	6	65	8	162
2020–21	Catalans Dragons	42	8	184	5	405
2021–23	FC Lézignan	28	6	122	3	271
	Total	319	78	1085	33	2515
Representative
Years	Team	Pld	T	G	FG	P
2008–09	NSW Residents	2	1	5	0	14
2010	Prime Minister's XIII	1	0	1	0	2
2013–16	NSW Country	3	2	8	0	24
2013–19	New South Wales	14	2	31	0	70
2016–17	Australia	3	2	11	0	30
- Source: As of 9 January 2024

James Maloney (born 15 June 1986) is an Australian professional rugby league footballer for Ourimbah Wyoming Magpies in the Central Coast Division Rugby League, and former assistant coach for the North Queensland Cowboys.

A five-eighth or halfback, Maloney also previously played for the Melbourne Storm, New Zealand Warriors, Sydney Roosters, Cronulla-Sutherland Sharks and the Penrith Panthers in the NRL, the Catalans Dragons in the Super League and FC Lezignan XIII in the Elite One Championship. He won the 2013 NRL Grand Final with the Roosters and the 2016 NRL Grand Final with the Sharks.

During his career, he was an Australian international and New South Wales State of Origin, Country Origin and Prime Minister's XIII representative.

== Background ==
Maloney was born in Orange. His father, Brian Maloney, was a lock and captain-coach of Orange CYMS in country New South Wales.

Maloney played his junior rugby for the St Edwards Bears, Ourimbah Wyoming Magpies and the North Sydney Bears.

== Playing career ==
=== Early career ===
Coming down from the Central Coast, Maloney first trialled with North Sydney Bears, playing with them in 2006. He then joined the Parramatta Eels in 2007 and helped the Wentworthville Magpies win the New South Wales Cup in 2008. He was a member of the NSW Cup team of the year in 2008. Despite Maloney's good form in the NSW cup over these two seasons, he failed to break into first grade and instead signed with the Melbourne Storm for the 2009 season.

=== 2009 ===
In 2009, Maloney moved to Melbourne and played for the Central Coast Storm in the NSW Cup. In Round 5 of the 2009 NRL season, Maloney made his NRL debut for the Melbourne Storm against the Penrith Panthers, playing at five-eighth in the 16–14 win at Olympic Park.

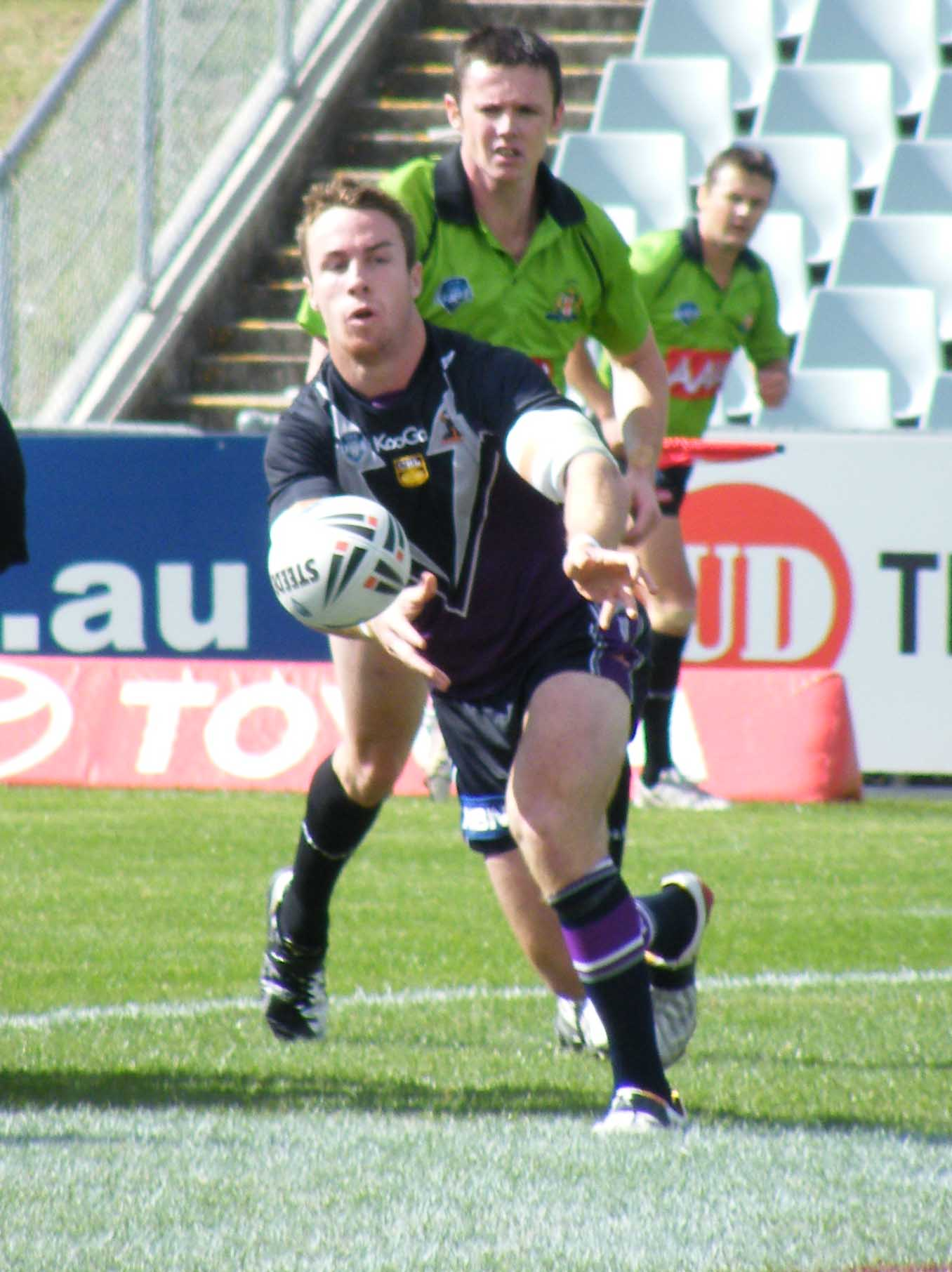
Maloney playing for the Central Coast Storm in 2009

Maloney represented the NSW Residents in 2009 against the Queensland Residents. Despite good form at both NSW Cup and NRL level, Maloney was restricted to just 4 matches in the top grade in the 2009 NRL season, rival clubs were lining up to give Maloney a better opportunity in first grade and by season's end on 7 August 2009, Maloney had signed a 3-year deal with the New Zealand Warriors beginning in 2010.

=== 2010 ===
In Round 1 of the 2010 NRL season, Maloney made his club debut for the New Zealand Warriors against the Gold Coast Titans, playing at five-eighth in the 24–18 loss at Robina Stadium. In Round 3 against the Brisbane Broncos, Maloney had an outstanding match by scoring a hattrick of tries that were his first NRL career tries and kicked 8 from 8 goals, finishing the match with 28 points in the 48–16 victory at Suncorp Stadium. Maloney had a breakthrough 2010 NRL season, scoring 188 points with 10 tries, 73 goals and 2 field goals in 24 matches in his first full NRL campaign. It put him in contention for Dally M recognition and he was on the shortlist for the standoff of the year at the Rugby League International Federation's awards. On 26 September 2010, Maloney made his representative debut, playing for Prime Minister's XIII to play Papua New Guinea playing at five-eighth and kicking 1 goal in the 30–18 win at Port Moresby.

=== 2011 ===
Maloney had an exceptional year for the Warriors where he helped his team make it into the 2011 NRL Grand Final against the Manly Sea Eagles, even though they fell short losing 24–10, Maloney kicked 1 goal in the match. Maloney finished the 2011 NRL season being the Warriors highest point scorer with 206 points, scoring 10 tries, kicking 82 goals and kicking 2 field goals in all of the 27 matches. On 28 November 2011, Maloney announced that he signed a 3-year deal with the Sydney Roosters, starting from the 2013 season.

=== 2012 ===
Maloney finished his last year with the New Zealand Warriors as the club's highest point scorer with 153 points, scoring 4 tries, kicking 67 goals and kicking 3 field goals in all of the 24 matches.

=== 2013 ===
In Round 1 of the 2013 NRL season, Maloney made his club debut for the Sydney Roosters against the South Sydney Rabbitohs, scoring a try and kicking a goal in the 28–10 loss at Sydney Football Stadium. On 21 April 2013, Maloney played for Country Origin against City Origin, playing at five-eighth in the 18–12 win at Coffs Harbour. On 5 June 2013, Maloney made his State of Origin debut for New South Wales against Queensland in Game 1 of the series alongside his Roosters halves partner Mitchell Pearce, playing at five-eighth and kicking 3 goals in the 14–6 win at ANZ Stadium. Maloney played in all 3 matches in the 2013 State of Origin series for the Blues in their 2–1 series loss. In Round 25 against the Gold Coast Titans, Maloney played his 100th NRL career match in the 30–22 loss at Sydney Football Stadium. In Round 26 against the South Sydney Rabbitohs, the Roosters won the minor premiership with Maloney playing a key role by scoring 2 tries and kicking 4 goals in their triumphant 24–12 at ANZ Stadium. On 6 October 2013, Maloney starred for the Roosters in the 2013 NRL Grand Final against the Manly Sea Eagles, setting up two tries with the boot, and kicking 5 goals in the 26–18 victory and winning his maiden NRL title. Maloney was the NRL's top points scorer for the 2013 NRL season with 252 points, by scoring 9 tries and kicking 108 goals in 25 matches for the Roosters.

=== 2014 ===
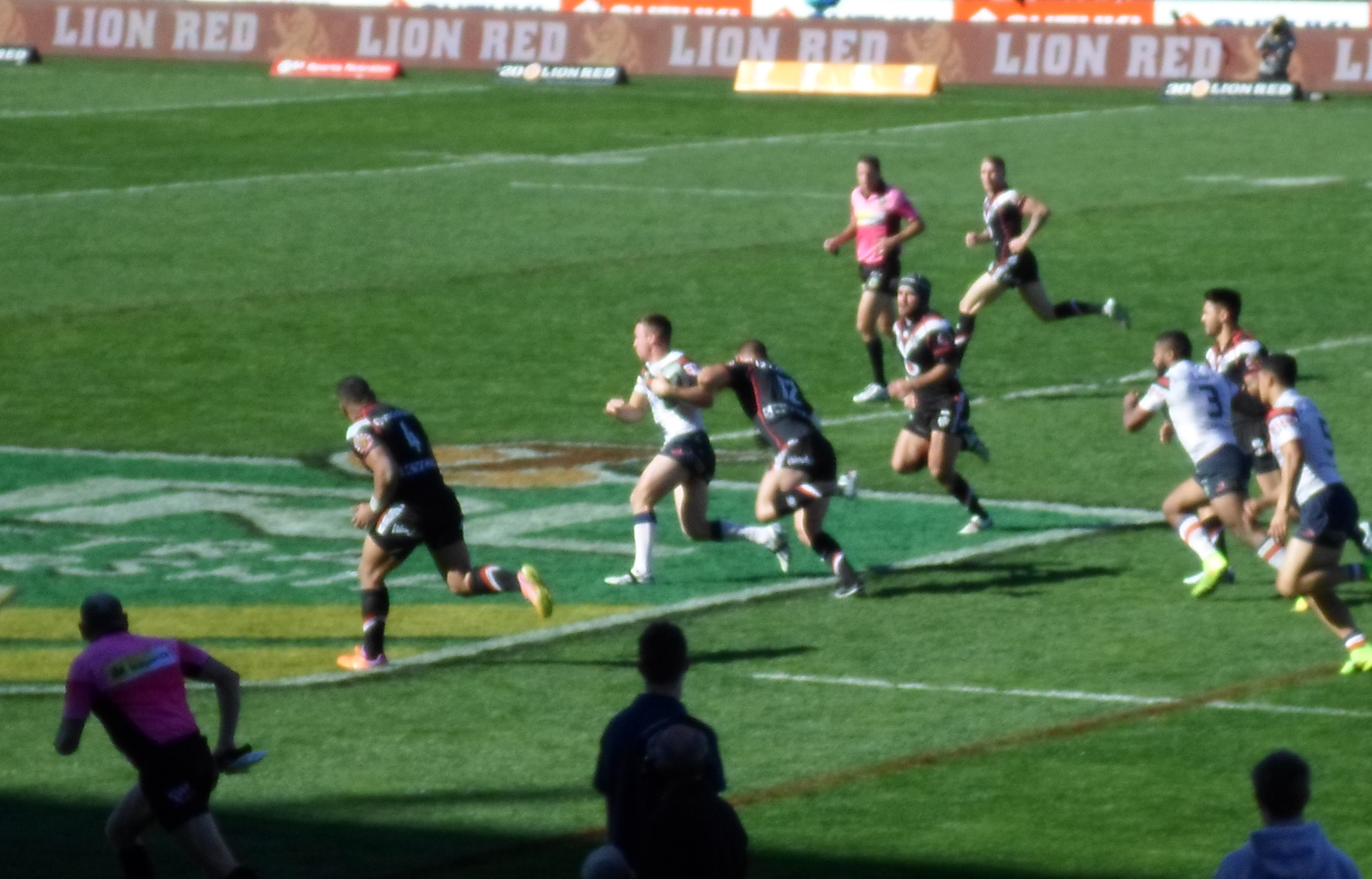
Maloney with a strong run V Warriors, 2014

Even though Maloney played no representative matches for the year, he led the Roosters to their second Minor Premiership in a row. Maloney finished the 2014 NRL season playing in all of the Roosters' 27 matches; he scored 5 tries, kicked 106 goals and kicked 2 field goals, tied with Dally M winner Johnathan Thurston as the NRL's competitions highest point scorer with 234 points.

=== 2015 ===
In January 2015, Maloney was named in the Roosters 2015 NRL Auckland Nines squad.

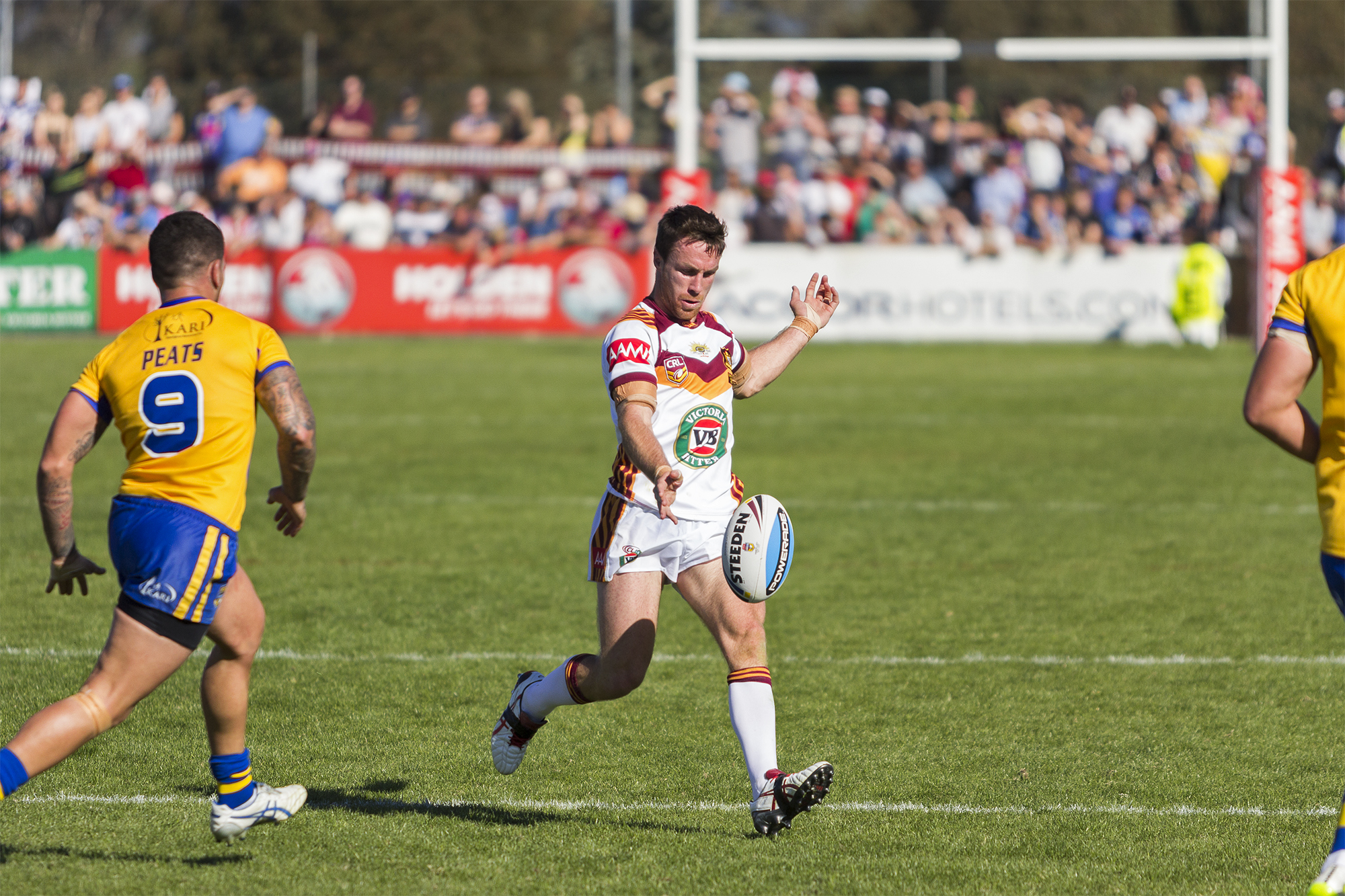
Maloney playing for Country in 2015

On 3 May 2015, Maloney played for Country Origin against City Origin, playing at five-eighth and kicking 5 goals in the 34–22 win at Wagga Wagga. On 18 June 2015, Maloney announced that he signed a 2-year deal with Cronulla Sharks, starting from 2016. In Round 21 against the Canterbury Bulldogs, Maloney played his 150th NRL career match in the 38–28 win at Sydney Football Stadium. The Roosters would go on to win their third Minor Premiership in a row and Maloney would again be the NRL competition's highest points scorer with 250 points, scoring 9 tries, kicking 106 goals and kicking 2 field goals while playing in all of the 27 matches in his last year with the Roosters in the 2015 NRL season.

=== 2016 ===
In Round 1 of the 2016 NRL season, Maloney made his club debut for Cronulla against the North Queensland Cowboys, playing at five-eighth and kicking three goals in the 20–14 loss at 1300SMILES Stadium. In Round 5 against the Wests Tigers, Maloney scored his first club try for the Sharks even as well kicking 7 goals in the 34–26 victory at Campbelltown Stadium. On 8 May 2016, Maloney played for Country Origin against City Origin, playing at five-eighth and scoring 2 tries in the 44–30 loss at Dubbo. Maloney's great form throughout the early rounds would land him a recall for New South Wales for the 2016 State of Origin series. In Game 2 at Suncorp Stadium, Maloney scored his first try in a Blues jersey in the series-losing 26–16 defeat. Maloney played in all 3 matches for Blues, scored 1 and kicked 3 goals in the 2–1 series loss. As the season went along, Maloney helped the Sharks charge into the Finals, aiming to break their 50-year premiership drought. In the Sharks important Preliminary Finals match against the last year premiers the North Queensland Cowboys, Maloney had an exceptional match, scoring 2 tries and kicking 6 goals in the Sharks triumphant 32–20 win at Sydney Football Stadium, booking the Sharks a spot in the big decider into the next week. On 28 September 2016, Maloney was named as the Dally M five eighth of the year. On 2 October 2016, Maloney played at five-eighth in the Sharks 2016 NRL Grand Final against the Melbourne Storm, kicking 3 goals in the Sharks historic 14–12 victory, winning their first ever premiership since entering the competition in 1967. Maloney finished his successful 2016 NRL season playing in 25 matches, scoring 7 tries, kicking 94 goals and kicking 3 field goals, being the Sharks highest point scorer with 219 points. Two days after the victory, on 4 October 2016, Maloney was rewarded for his great year for the Sharks by being selected in Mal Meninga's Australian 24-man squad for the 2016 Four Nations. On 28 October 2016, Maloney made his international debut for Australia against Scotland, playing at five-eighth, scoring 1 try and kicking 7 goals in the smashing 54–12 win at Craven Park in Hull. Maloney only played in 2 matches in the tournament, with 1 try and 7 goals.

=== 2017 ===
Maloney was selected play for New South Wales for the 2017 State of Origin series, playing at five-eighth in all 3 matches, scoring 1 try and kicking 7 goals in the 2–1 series loss. In Round 24 against the North Queensland Cowboys, Maloney played his 200th NRL career match in the 26–16 win at 1300SMILES Stadium. Maloney finished the 2017 NRL season, again being the Sharks highest point scorer with him, scoring 4 tries, kicking 71 goals and kicking 3 goals in 20 matches. On 2 October 2017, Maloney was selected in the 24-man squad for Australia for the 2017 Rugby League World Cup. Maloney would only play in 1 match in the tournament which was against Lebanon, where he played at five-eighth, scored a try and kicked 4 goals in the 34–0 win at Sydney Football Stadium. In November 2017, rumours were flying around that Maloney was set to take a player swap deal with Matt Moylan from the Penrith Panthers to join their respective clubs on 3-year deals. A month later on 3 December 2017, it was announced that Maloney signed the 3-year deal with the Penrith Panthers, worth $2.4 million and Matt Moylan was released from his contract to join the Sharks in the player swap deal.

=== 2018 ===
In Round 1 of the 2018 NRL season, Maloney made his club debut for his 5th club the Penrith Panthers against the Parramatta Eels, playing at five-eighth in the 24–14 win at Penrith Stadium. In Round 3 against Canterbury, Maloney scored his first club try for the Panthers in their 20–18 loss at ANZ Stadium. Later that year, Maloney was selected to play Five Eighth for NSW for all three games of the 2018 State of Origin series where NSW won the series 2–1, the first since 2014.

Maloney made a total of 22 appearances for Penrith as the club finished 5th on the table. In week one of the finals, Maloney kicked a field goal and scored a try as Penrith defeated the New Zealand Warriors 27–12. In week two, Penrith were eliminated by Maloney's former side Cronulla 21–20.

=== 2019 ===
At the beginning of the 2019 season, Penrith were expected to be challenging for position in the top 4 of the competition but found themselves sitting last on the table after only winning 2 of their first 10 games with Maloney and teammate Nathan Cleary copping criticism. Maloney was not selected by NSW coach Brad Fittler for the first game of the 2019 State of Origin series.

In Round 12 against Manly, Maloney kicked 3 goals and field goal as Penrith won the match 15–12. In the following 2 weeks, Maloney kicked field goals which won Penrith the match against Sydney Roosters and South Sydney. On 16 June, Maloney was named in the New South Wales side for Game 2 of the 2019 State of Origin series in which New South Wales would go on to win 38–6 at Optus Stadium in Perth.

In Round 15 against the New Zealand Warriors, Maloney kicked his third field goal of the season as Penrith defeated New Zealand 19–18 in golden point extra time. In Game 3 of the 2019 State of Origin series, Maloney kicked 5 goals and helped New South Wales to a 26–20 victory at ANZ Stadium. It was the first time since 2005 that New South Wales had won back to back series. The series was won in the last minute of the match courtesy to a try by James Tedesco.

On 24 July, it was announced that Maloney had signed a three-year deal starting from the 2020 season with the Catalans Dragons.

Maloney's final game in the NRL was in round 25 against Newcastle in which Penrith won the match 54–10 at Penrith Park. Penrith missed out on the finals finishing a disappointing 10th.

=== 2020 ===
Maloney played 14 games for Catalans Dragons in the 2020 Super League season including the 48-2 semi-final loss against St Helens. Maloney was sent to the sin bin in the first half of the game for a high tackle.

=== 2021 ===
In round 1 of the 2021 Super League season. Maloney kicked a field goal in golden point extra-time to earn Catalans Dragons a 29-28 victory over Hull KR. On 17 August, Maloney announced his retirement from rugby league at the end of the 2021 Super League season.

In the 2021 Magic Weekend match, Maloney kicked a drop goal for Catalans in their 31-30 victory over St Helens. Catalans were losing the match 30-12 with just five minutes remaining. The victory also meant that Catalans claimed the League Leaders Shield for the first time.

On 9 October, Maloney played for Catalans in their 2021 Super League Grand Final defeat against St. Helens. It was also Maloney's final match as a top-level professional rugby league player as he announced his retirement earlier in the season.

=== Elite 1 ===
On 6 December 2021, Maloney made his debut for FC Lezignan XIII in the French Elite 1, scoring five goals and the match-winning field goal. On 10 April 2022, Maloney was stood down from playing after an alleged doping breach.

== Statistics ==
Season	Team	Pld	T	G	G%	FG	P
2009	Melbourne Storm	4	–	–	–	–	0
2010	New Zealand Warriors	24	10	73	75.26%	2	188
2011	New Zealand Warriors	27	10	82	74.55%	2	206
2012	New Zealand Warriors	24	4	67	76.14%	3	153
2013	Sydney Roosters	25	9	108	87.10%	–	252
2014	Sydney Roosters	27	5	106	83.46%	2	234
2015	Sydney Roosters	27	9	106	82.81%	2	250
2016	Cronulla-Sutherland Sharks	25	7	94	77.69%	3	219
2017	Cronulla-Sutherland Sharks	20	4	71	87.65%	3	161
2018	Penrith Panthers	22	4	53	85.71%	4	126
2019	Penrith Panthers	22	2	12		4	36
2020	Catalans Dragons	17	3	70			164
2021	Catalans Dragons	25	5	114		5	267
2021-23	FC Lézignan	28	6	122		3	271
Overall		319	78	1085		33	2,515

== Coaching career ==
On 14 November 2023, Maloney joined the North Queensland Cowboys as an assistant coach, signing a two-year contract. On 4 September 2024, it was announced that he was fired after being charged with drink driving.
