= Matt McIlwrick =

New Zealand rugby league footballer

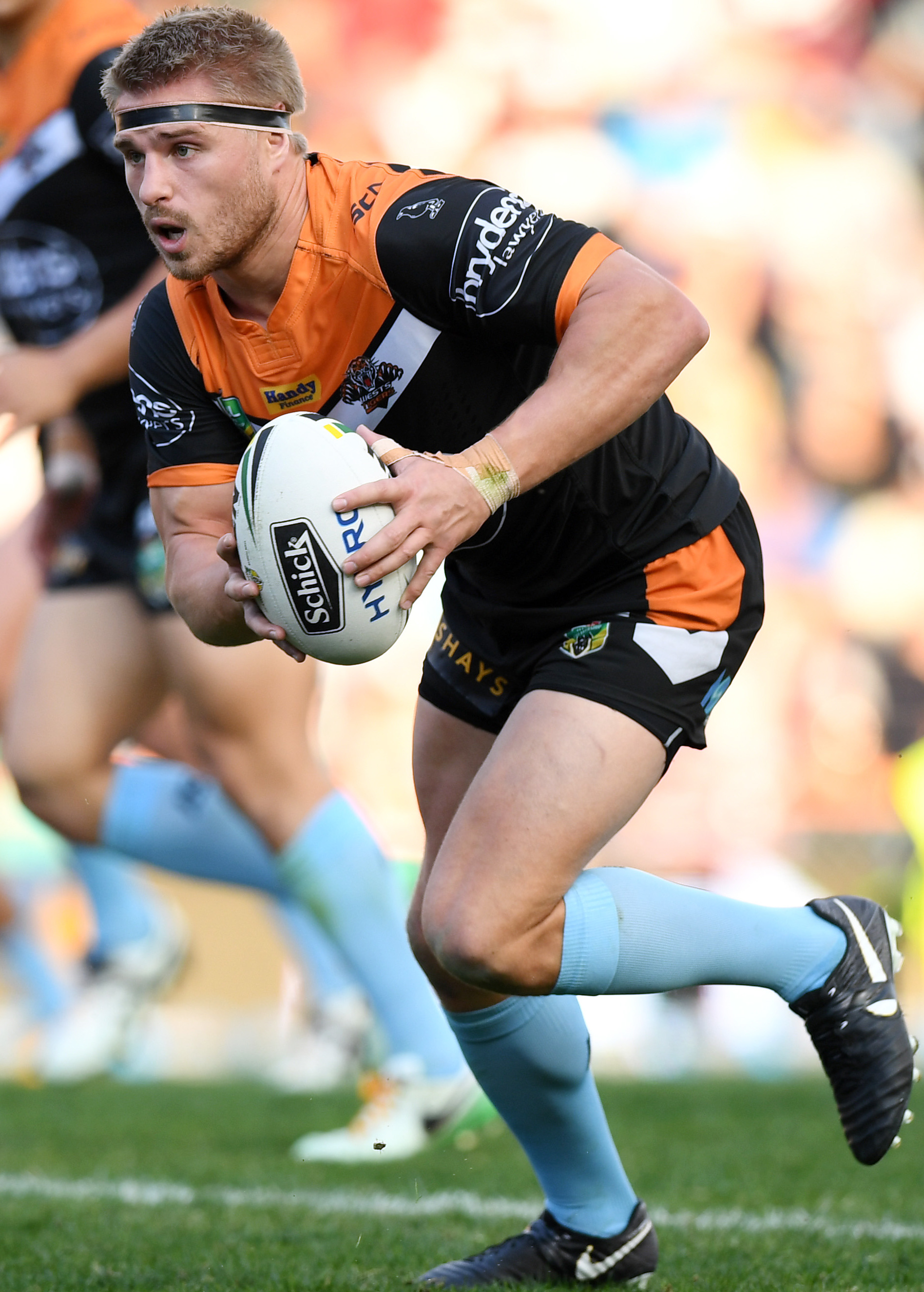

Personal information
- Full name: Matthew McIlwrick
- Born: 4 June 1991 (age 35) Christchurch, New Zealand

Playing information
- Height: 182 cm (6 ft 0 in)
- Weight: 95 kg (14 st 13 lb)
- Position: Hooker, Lock
Club
Years	Team	Pld	T	G	FG	P
2012–14	Canberra Raiders	19	1	0	0	4
2015	Sydney Roosters	8	0	0	0	0
2016	Cronulla Sharks	2	0	0	0	0
2017–18	Wests Tigers	27	2	0	0	8
	Total	56	3	0	0	12

Matt McIlwrick (born 4 June 1991) is a New Zealand former professional rugby league footballer who played as a hooker and lock.

He previously played for the Canberra Raiders, Sydney Roosters, Cronulla-Sutherland Sharks, Wests Tigers and the South Sydney Rabbitohs in the National Rugby League.

== Background ==
McIlwrick was born in Christchurch, New Zealand.

He played his junior football for the Halswell Hornets. While playing for the Hornets, he represented the New Zealand Under 16s team. In 2008, he joined the Canberra Raiders on a 3-year contract.

== Playing career ==
=== 2008-11 ===
In 2008, McIlwrick played for the Canberra Raiders' S. G. Ball Cup team, winning the Players' Player award. In Round 10 of the 2008 NYC season, McIlwrick made his NYC debut. He went on to play in 64 NYC matches between 2008 and 2011.

In 2010, McIlwrick played for the Junior Kiwis in their 2010 two-match series against the Junior Kangaroos.

=== 2012-15 ===
Before the start of the 2012 NRL season, McIlwrick re-signed with the Raiders on a 2-year contract. He moved on to the Raiders' New South Wales Cup team, Mount Pritchard Mounties. In Round 8, he made his NRL debut for the Raiders against the Cronulla-Sutherland Sharks.

On 18 April 2013, McIlwrick re-signed with the Raiders on a 2-year contract.

On 9 September 2014, McIlwrick was named in the New Zealand train-on squad for the 2014 Four Nations, but didn't make the final squad. In November, the Sydney Roosters made an inquiry about the contract status of McIlwrick, looking to potentially sign him as a back-up to regular hooker Jake Friend, but the approach was initially turned down by the Raiders. On 4 December, after coming to an agreement, McIlwrick signed a 1-year contract with the Roosters starting in 2015, after being released from the final year of his Raiders contract.

McIlwrick played in 8 games for the Roosters in the 2015 season, but was released at the end of the year. On 20 November, he signed a 1-year contract with the Cronulla-Sutherland Sharks starting in 2016.

=== 2016-17 ===
Making just 2 appearances in first grade, McIlwrick was, however, named at hooker in the 2016 Intrust Super Premiership NSW Team of the Year. In late 2016, Jason Taylor announced that McIlwrick had signed with the Wests Tigers on a one-year contract starting in 2017.

With former hooker Robbie Farah having left the club and Jacob Liddle having only played one game of first grade, McIlwrick started the season as Wests Tigers hooker. Interchanging with Liddle, McIlwrick played in every game of the season before missing the last through suspension. He was second in the club for tackles made, and was described as having a "solid year." His contract was extended to the end of the 2019 season.

=== 2018 ===
On 29 June, McIlwrick joined South Sydney in a player switch with Robbie Farah. McIlwrick said of the move "It's been a bit of a whirlwind last couple of days but I'm extremely privileged to be at such a proud club and I can't wait to rip in with the boys, from the outside in, South Sydney has always been such a big club, has some big names and is historically well known. I'm excited to be part of that and I've heard great things about the culture here".

=== 2019 ===
On 18 March, South Sydney announced they were releasing McIlwrick from the remainder of his contract to "join another NRL club". On 20 March, he signed with the Parramatta Eels for the 2019 season. but made no appearances for them, instead playing for their feeder club side the Wentworthville Magpies in the Canterbury Cup NSW competition. McIlwrick played in Wentworthville's grand final defeat by Newtown Jets. On 5 November, McIlwrick announced his retirement as a player via his Instagram account saying "After 8 years of playing Professional Rugby League I have decided it’s time for me to retire, I am fortunate enough to have made some life long mates through footy since moving to Australia from NZ 12 years ago. I have been extremely lucky to have played with and against some of the greatest players in the world, been coached by some of the best coaches and had the privilege of pulling on the jersey for many great clubs over the years".
