= Brendan Elliot =

Australian professional rugby league footballer

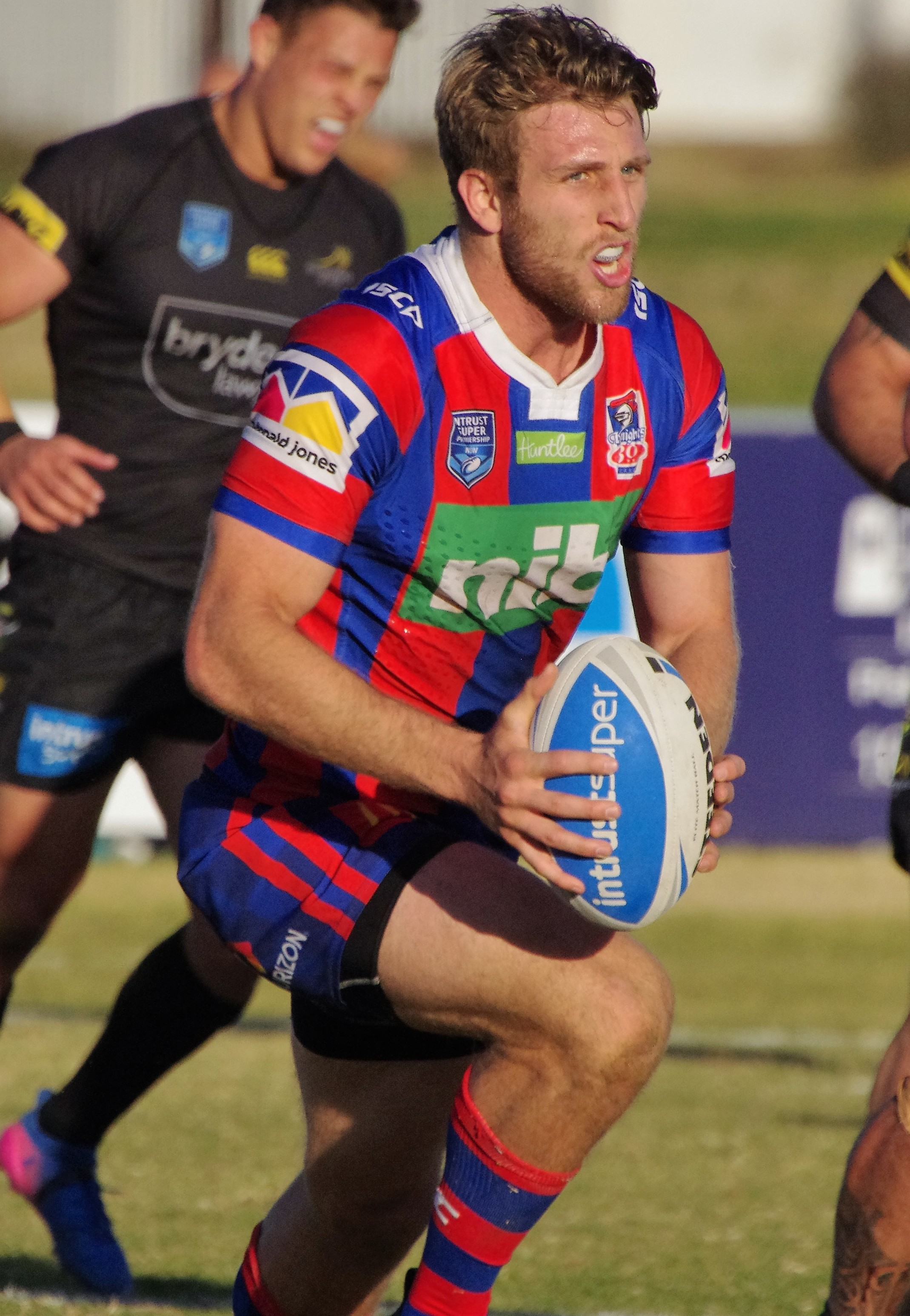

Personal information
- Full name: Brendan Elliot
- Born: 1 January 1994 (age 31); Brisbane, Queensland, Australia
- Height: 183 cm (6 ft 0 in)
- Weight: 92 kg (14 st 7 lb)

Playing information
- Position: Wing, Fullback, Centre
Club
Years	Team	Pld	T	G	FG	P
2014–16	Sydney Roosters	14	9	0	0	36
2016–17	Newcastle Knights	23	10	0	0	40
2018	Gold Coast Titans	3	0	0	0	0
2019–20	Manly Sea Eagles	26	2	0	0	8
2021	Leigh Centurions	11	3	0	0	12
2022–23	North Qld Cowboys	6	0	0	0	0
	Total	83	24	0	0	96
- Source: As of 7 April 2023

Brendan Elliot (born 1 January 1994) is an Australian former professional rugby league footballer who played as a winger.

He previously played for the Sydney Roosters, Newcastle Knights, Gold Coast Titans, Manly Sea Eagles and the North Queensland Cowboys in the National Rugby League (NRL) and Leigh Centurions in the Super League. He has also played as a fullback and centre.

== Background ==
Elliot was born in Brisbane, Queensland, Australia.

He played his junior rugby league for the Runaway Bay Seagulls. He also played rugby union while attending The Southport School, before being signed by the Sydney Roosters.

== Playing career ==
=== Early years ===
From 2012 to 2014, Elliot played for the Sydney Roosters' NYC team.

=== 2014 ===
On 3 May, Elliot played for the Queensland under-20s team against the New South Wales under-20s team. In round 17 of the 2014 NRL season, he made his NRL debut for the Roosters against the Cronulla-Sutherland Sharks, scoring a try on debut. On 2 September, he was named at centre in the 2014 NYC Team of the Year.

=== 2015 ===
On 27 July, Elliot re-signed with the Sydney Roosters on a two-year contract.

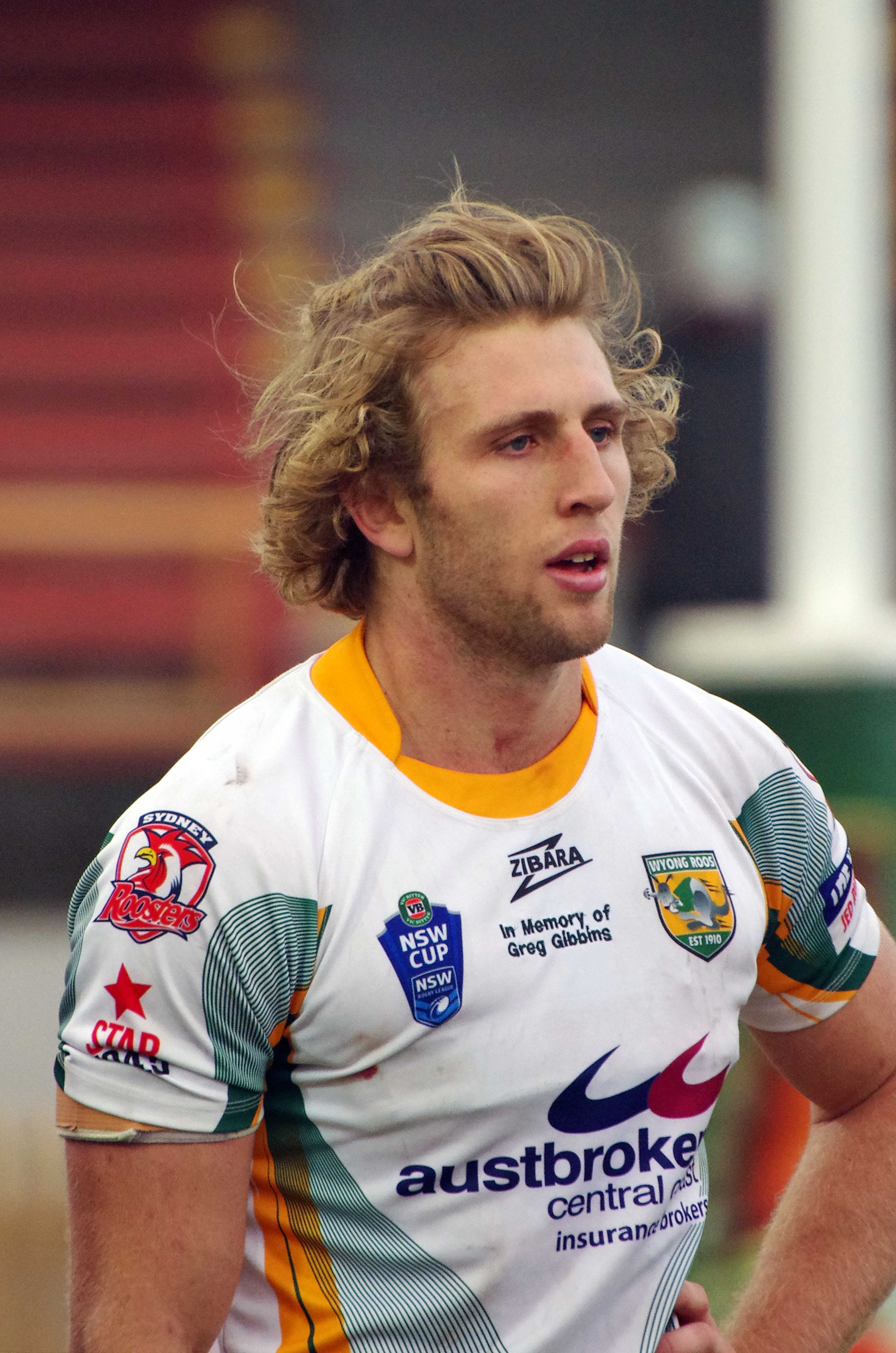
Elliot playing for Wyong Roos in 2015

=== 2016 ===
On 8 June, Elliot joined the Newcastle Knights effective immediately on a contract until the end of 2017, after being released from the final two years of his Sydney Roosters contract. He made his Newcastle debut in round 14 against the New Zealand Warriors, scoring a try.

=== 2017 ===
After 23 games for the Newcastle club, Elliot left the club at the conclusion of the 2017 season due to not being offered a new contract. In October, he signed a one-year contract with the Gold Coast Titans starting in 2018.

=== 2018 ===
Elliot made his Gold Coast debut in round 8 against the Cronulla-Sutherland Sharks, playing at centre. In July, it was announced that he would depart the Titans mid-season to take up a contract with the Leigh Centurions in the Championship until the end of 2018. However the Gold Coast outfit refused to release him due to injuries and lack of depth of outside backs at the club. He then went on to sign with the Manly-Warringah Sea Eagles for the 2019 season.

=== 2019 ===
Elliot made his debut for Manly-Warringah against the Wests Tigers in round 1 of the 2019 NRL season at Leichhardt Oval. He scored his first try for the club in Round 10 against Cronulla at Shark Park which ended in a 24-14 victory.

Elliot made a total of 18 appearances for Manly as the club finished sixth on the table at the end of the 2019 regular season. Elliot played in both finals matches for the club, scoring a try in week one of the finals series against Cronulla-Sutherland. In the second week of the finals, Manly were eliminated by South Sydney after losing 34-26 at ANZ Stadium.

=== 2020 ===
Elliott made eight appearances for Manly-Warringah in the 2020 NRL season as the club missed out on the finals. In September, Elliott was released by the Manly club.

=== 2021 ===
On 16 February, it was reported that he had signed for Leigh in the Super League.

=== 2022 ===
On 25 January, through the club website it was announced that he had signed with the North Queensland Cowboys, returning to the National Rugby League.

=== 2023 ===
Elliott was limited to only three appearances with North Queensland in the 2023 NRL season. On 20 September, it was announced that Elliott would be leaving North Queensland after not being offered a new contract. Elliott was one of nine players who were released.
