= Brian Canavan =

Brian Canavan is the current NRL Head of Football as of 17 May 2016 and was the former CEO of the Australian National Rugby League team, the Sydney Roosters from 2003 to 2013.

In 2010, Canavan was appointed to forensically investigate the on-and-off field performances, attitude, behaviour, conduct and setup of the New South Wales State of Origin team following its fifth straight series loss to Queensland. Despite his best efforts, New South Wales has continued to underachieve in the State of Origin arena; as of 2026, the Blues have lost fifteen of twenty-one State of Origin series dating back to 2005, including losing the deciding game of the 2015 series by a record margin of 52–6.

It was announced in October 2012 that he would return to the Sydney Roosters which will see him take up a role as the chief operating officer of football.
