= Anthony Minichiello =

Former Australia & Italy international rugby league footballer

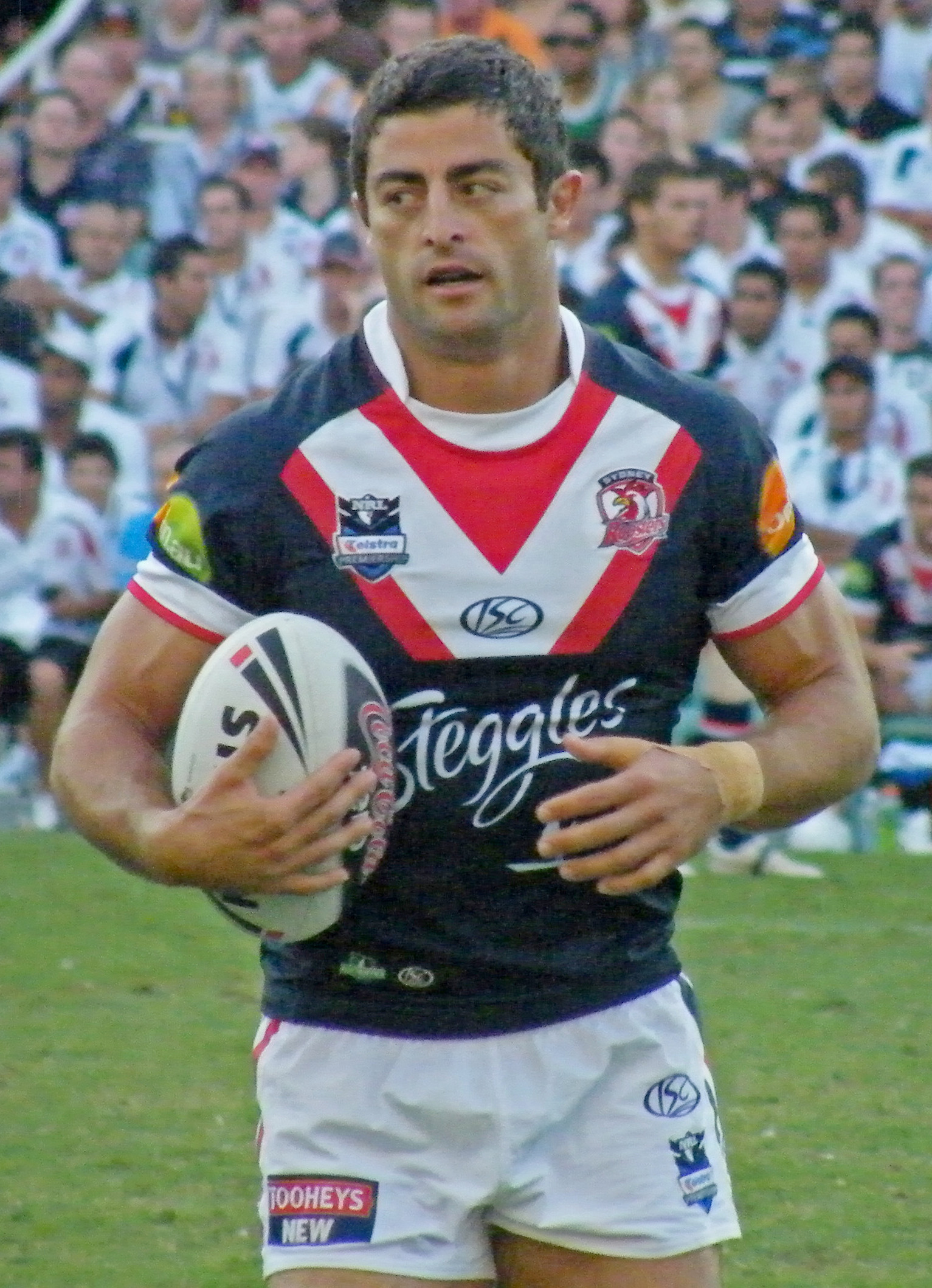

Personal information
- Full name: Antonio Marcus Minichiello
- Born: 24 May 1980 (age 46) Liverpool, New South Wales, Australia

Playing information
- Height: 182 cm (6 ft 0 in)
- Weight: 91 kg (14 st 5 lb)
- Position: Fullback, Wing
Club
Years	Team	Pld	T	G	FG	P
2000–14	Sydney Roosters	302	139	0	1	557
Representative
Years	Team	Pld	T	G	FG	P
1999–13	Italy	7	1	0	0	4
2001–10	NSW City Origin	4	2	0	0	8
2003–11	New South Wales	11	8	0	0	32
2003–05	Australia	19	11	0	0	44
- Relatives: Mark Minichiello (brother)

Anthony Minichiello (born 24 May 1980) is a former professional rugby league footballer who captained the Sydney Roosters in the National Rugby League, and retired having set records for most games and most tries in the club's history. An Australia and Italy international as well as a New South Wales State of Origin representative wing turned fullback, he played his entire career with the Roosters, with whom he won the 2002 and 2013 NRL Premierships, before retiring at the conclusion of the club's 2014 campaign. Minichiello also won the Golden Boot Award for international player of the year in 2005, and is the brother of fellow Italian international, Mark Minichiello.

== Background ==
Minichiello was born in Liverpool in South Western Sydney, Australia.

Minichiello grew up on a five-acre property near Liverpool, Southwest Sydney, with Italian heritage. His family maintained a lifestyle that included growing their own vegetables and raising chickens. His main sport as a youth was gymnastics, which he participated in from age six to eleven, competing at the state level in tumbling. He also competed in long-distance running at the state level.

Minichiello began playing rugby league for East Valley United. Minichiello attended All Saints Catholic Senior College. At a young age, he was spotted by then Roosters recruitment officer, rugby league Immortal Arthur Beetson, who signed him up to the foundation club. In 1999 he played for Italy in the inaugural Mediterranean Cup. On 4 August 2014 he announced his retirement at the end of the season.

== Professional playing career ==
=== Early career ===
Minichiello was signed by the Sydney Roosters at age 16 following a trial game where he played right centre, an event facilitated by Arthur Beetson. As a condition for pursuing his football career, his father required him to either finish his schooling or learn a trade. Minichiello chose the latter and undertook a cabinet-making apprenticeship with Dominic Chimera at West End Kitchens in Austral, balancing work, TAFE, and Roosters training commitments.

=== 2000s ===
After a stint in the lower grades, Minichiello made his NRL debut at the age of 20 in the Roosters' Round 4 clash on 25 February 2000 at the Sydney Football Stadium against the Bulldogs. This made him the 994th first grader to play for the Roosters. He tasted the bitterness of defeat at the end of his debut year in the Roosters' loss to the Brisbane Broncos in the 2000 NRL Grand Final. By midway through his second season, he had proven himself worthy of representative football when he was selected to play for City Origin in the 2001 City vs Country Origin match against Country Origin.

After scoring 16 tries during the 2002 NRL season, Minichiello played on the wing for the Roosters in their 2002 NRL Grand Final win over the New Zealand Warriors. He was also part of the successful Roosters team that took out the 2003 World Club Challenge against 2002 Super League champions, St. Helens. With Mini playing fullback, the Roosters easily accounted for Saints 38–0 at the Reebok Stadium in Bolton, England in front of 19,807 fans. For the first three seasons of his career Mini played on the wing for the Roosters, but the retirement of Luke Phillips following the 2002 NRL Grand Final prompted then-Roosters coach Ricky Stuart to move Minichiello to fullback. His move to fullback coincided with some of the Roosters' best football for the early part of the new millennium. It also saw him become an almost automatic selection for both NSW and Australia for the next few seasons. With the help of the recently New Zealand former Warriors fullback and newly appointed Roosters Premier League coach Ivan Cleary, Mini would become a vital part of the Roosters attack. His great performance in his new position soon paid off with selection for City in the 2003 City vs Country Origin match and for New South Wales in the 2003 State of Origin series, and went on to play in his 100th NRL game for the Roosters in the first Preliminary Final of the 2003 NRL Finals Series. He was declared Man of the Match in the Roosters 28–18 victory over the Bulldogs. The Roosters subsequently lost the 2003 NRL Grand Final to the Penrith Panthers, in which Minichiello played at fullback. Minichiello ran 4,571 metres with the ball in 2003, more than any other player in the competition. After that he was selected to go on the successful 2003 Kangaroo tour in which Australia defeated their oldest rivals Great Britain 3–0 to retain The Ashes. Mini played on the wing for the Kangaroos in all three tests due to the presence of Brisbane Broncos fullback Darren Lockyer, who was also the captain of the Kangaroos.

In 2004, Minichiello was again selected to play for New South Wales but just five days out from Game I he was sacked for taking a mobile telephone out contrary to team instructions during a wild bonding session. However he fought his way back into the squad and help steered New South Wales to its second series victory. He was named the Dally M Fullback of the Year in the 2004 NRL season, where he scored a career best 18 tries for the season. He also won the Harry Sunderland Medal as the player's player of the year. Mini went on to play at fullback for the Roosters in their 16–13 loss to the Bulldogs in the 2004 NRL Grand Final. It was the Roosters third Grand Final loss in four games since 2000. Minichiello was selected in the Australian team to go and compete in the end of season 2004 Rugby League Tri-Nations tournament. In the final against Great Britain he played at fullback and scored two tries in the Kangaroos' 44–4 victory. Another great season followed in 2005, where Minichiello's performances at fullback for NSW resulted in him winning the Wally Lewis Medal for player of the 2005 State of Origin series. The year was capped off with him winning the Harry Sunderland Medal again as the man of the 2005 Rugby League Tri-Nations tournament, despite New Zealand causing a boil over by defeating Australia 24–0 in the Final at Elland Road in Leeds (it was the first time since 1972 that Australia had not won an international series or tournament in which they played). The game would also prove to be Anthony Minichiello's 18th and final test for Australia. He would go on to win the 2005 Golden Boot Award as the international player of the year.

One of the longest injury/suspension free period of any player in the modern era came to end in Round 6, 2006. A back injury, first sustained in Roosters' Round 3 clash on 26 March 2006 against the Canberra Raiders, that eventually required surgery ruled Minichiello out for the remainder of season. His back injury allowed several younger fullbacks to stake claims for the Australian jersey, particularly Brisbane Broncos fullback Karmichael Hunt. Minichiello's downfall from injury also coincided with the Roosters' decline in form, with the team finishing second from last at the end of the 2006 season.

Between 2006 and 2009, Minichiello experienced a series of severe injuries that threatened his career. In 2006, he had a ruptured L5/S1 disc requiring surgery. This was followed in 2007 by a ruptured L4/5 disc, necessitating a second back operation. In 2008, he suffered a significant C5/C6 disc bulge in his neck, which was reportedly 1mm from his spinal cord, and scans revealed his spinal discs were generally dehydrated. These injuries led him to explore functional movement training with Aaron McKenzie of Origin of Energy and adopt a specific nutritional approach focusing on whole foods, slow cooking methods, reducing processed foods, and intermittent fasting, which he credits for managing inflammation and extending his career.

As part of the Roosters' 100th season celebration, a "Team 100 – The Centurions" was announced at the 2007 season launch. Minichiello was named as fullback. He kicked his first field goal in his career when the Roosters defeated the Cronulla-Sutherland Sharks in golden point, in Round 11, 2007. Minichiello was recalled as NSW fullback for Game 1 of the 2007 State of Origin series. He played an impressive first game (won 25–18 by Queensland), but unfortunately was ruled out of the second game and the third game too as his back injury was troubling him. He was replaced as the Blues custodian by Manly Sea Eagles flyer Brett Stewart. Unfortunately Mini's back injury put him on the sideline for the remainder of the 2007 season.

The 2008 NRL season saw Mini return to the field after a re-occurrence of his back injury put him out for the back half of the 2007 season. Unfortunately, during a round 4 clash with the Canterbury Bulldogs, pain in his back returned. This severely harmed his chances of regaining his Australian fullback jersey and he was overlooked in favour of both Brett Stewart and Melbourne Storm fullback Billy Slater. Stewart and Slater were also the respective fullbacks for NSW and Qld at the time. In 2009, Anthony played 2 games before injuring his ankle against the Canberra Raiders. He was sidelined until Round 20; by then, the Roosters were in deep trouble and staring down of their worst season since failing to win a single game in 1966. Eventually, the Roosters finished last on the NRL ladder, completing a spectacular downfall from the first half of the decade in which the Sydney Roosters were dominant, but had only one NRL Premiership to show for it.

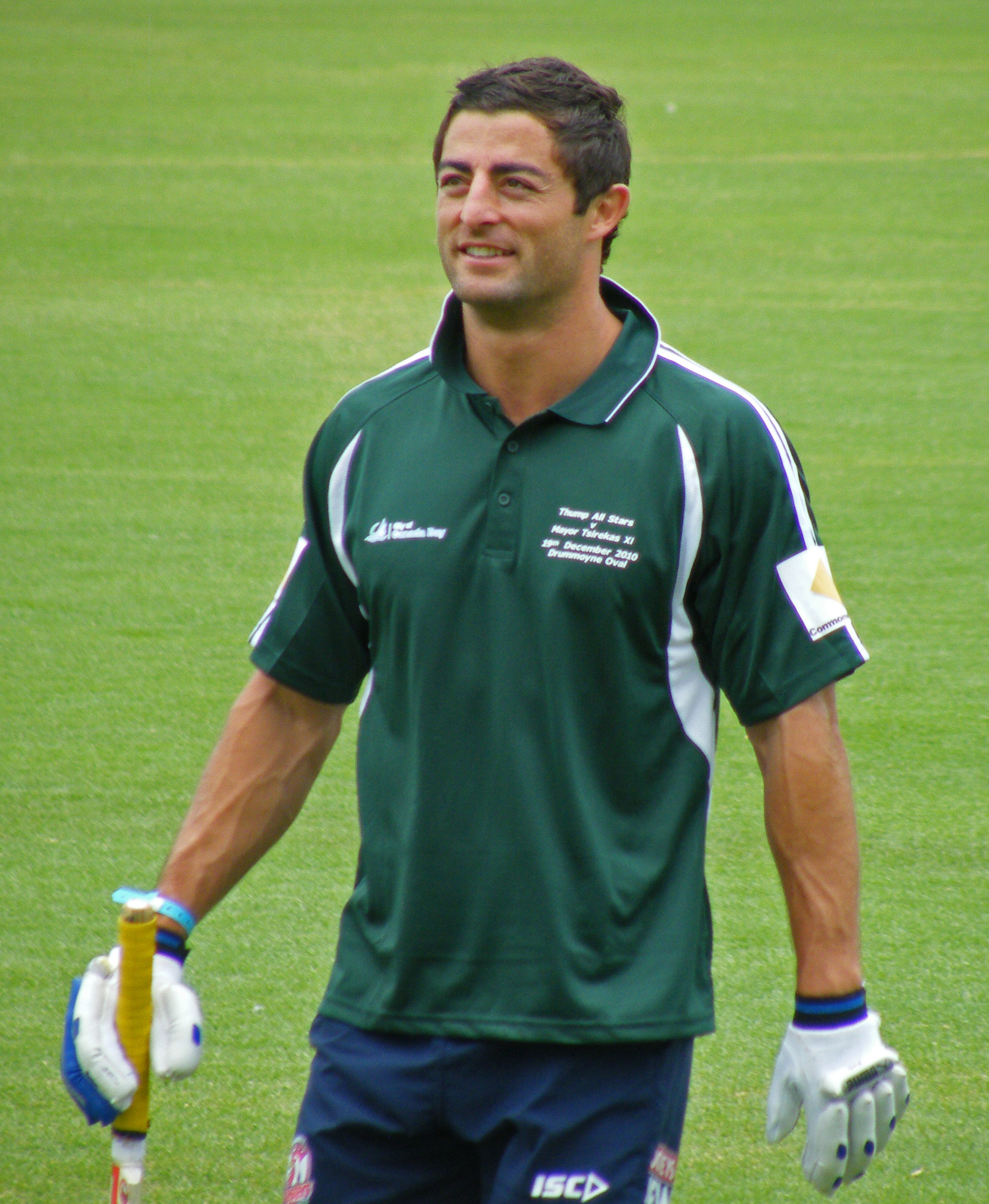
Minichiello in 2010

=== 2010s ===
In the 2010 NRL season, Minichiello returned to the field injury-free for the first time since 2005. As part of the Roosters "clean out", he was moved from fullback to the wing to make way for new recruit Todd Carney. He settled well in this position and was selected to play in the 2010 City v Country Origin match on 7 May 2010. Due to Minichiello's good form, he and his manager cleared all rumours of a possible move to the Cronulla Sharks, and signed a one-year deal with the Roosters with a possible one-year extension on top of that. On 23 August 2010, Minichiello broke the 100 try barrier against the Gold Coast Titans in Round 24.

Minichiello was rested from the Roosters' final two regular season matches with a hamstring injury, however he returned to full fitness for the 2010 NRL finals series. The Roosters advanced to the Grand Final, were beaten 32–8 by the Wayne Bennett coached St George Illawarra Dragons in a disappointing end to what was otherwise a massive improvement from the previous year. By Round 8 of the 2010 season, Mini had been moved back to fullback by coach Brian Smith, with Carney moving to his preferred position of Five-eighth. Other than playing on the wing in rounds 12 and 13, Mini would remain at fullback for the rest of the year. For his part, Carney would go on to win the Dally M Medal as the NRL Player of the Year, the first Roosters player to do so since Gary Freeman in 1992.

In 2011 he was announced as a member of the Italian side that will compete in the 2013 World Cup qualifying. After consistent form in a struggling Roosters side, Minichiello received an Origin call-up for Game 2 of the 2011 State of Origin series. This occurred after the incumbent Blues fullback, Josh Dugan, succumbed to an ankle injury the day the side was named. Minichiello's experience in the young Blues backline proved valuable as he scored the match-winner for New South Wales after Five-eight Jamie Soward dazzled the Queensland defence. The Blues won 18–8, largely due to the experienced combination of Minichiello and Ricky Stuart, who was back coaching New South Wales after five years out of the side. In Round 16 of the NRL season, he scored his 105th try against the Newcastle Knights, making him the all-time leading try-scorer for the Roosters, breaking the record of 104 previously held by Bill Mullins (1968–78).

At the end of the 2011 NRL season, Minichiello captained Italy to a 19-all draw with Lebanon that was enough for them to gain the 14th and final place in the 2013 World Cup.

On 4 May 2012, Minichiello agreed to a new one-year deal keeping him with the Roosters until the end of 2013, despite being told at the start of the season that he would not be re-signed.

Minichello went on to captain the Roosters in 2013 and to the 2013 NRL Grand Final victory, becoming the first fullback to captain his team to a grand final victory since Frank 'Skinny' McMillan in 1934.

At the end of the 2013 NRL season, Minichiello captained Italy in the 2013 World Cup. Italy would finish their campaign in the Group Stage after they beat Wales, drew with Scotland and lost to Tonga.

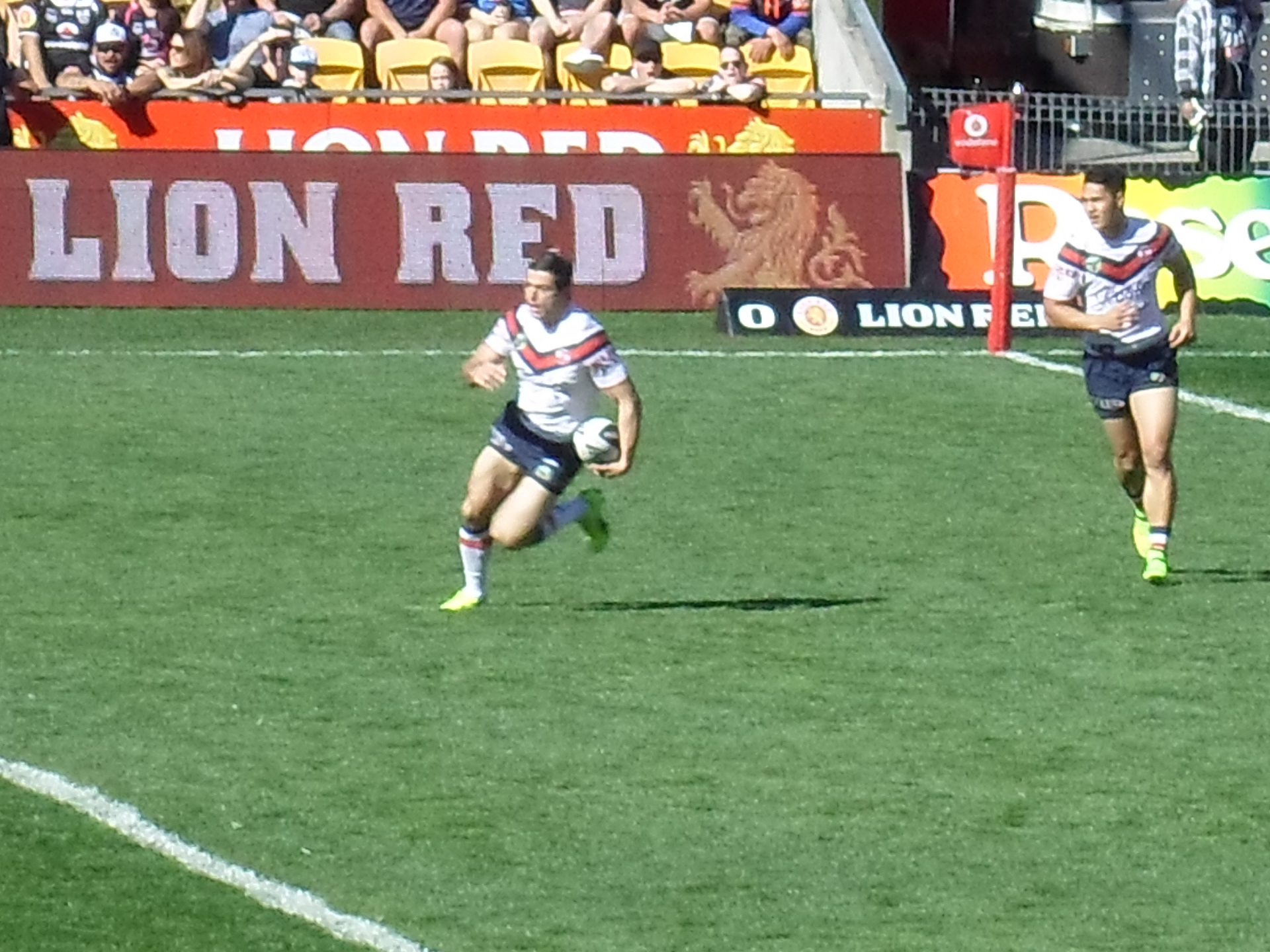
Roosters legend, Anthony Minichiello running with the ball against the Warriors, in 2014

On 4 August Minichiello announced his official retirement from the game as a one club man.

In his final outing for the club, Minichiello broke former team-mate Luke Ricketson's record for most matches with the Roosters. The record, which had stood for twelve years, was 301, with Minichiello captaining the Roosters with a stellar two-try performance for game #302 in his side's 32–22 Grand Final Qualifier defeat by the Rabbitohs, His record was surpassed by Mitchell Aubusson (306) in 2020.

=== Honours ===
Individual

- 2004: Dally M Fullback of the Year
- 2004: Harry Sunderland Medal (Tri-Nations)
- 2005: Golden Boot Award Rugby League World International Player of the Year
- 2005: Harry Sunderland Medal (Tri-Nations)
- 2005: RLIF Back of the Year Award
- 2005: Wally Lewis Medal (State of Origin)
- 2007: Sydney Roosters Team of the Century (Fullback)

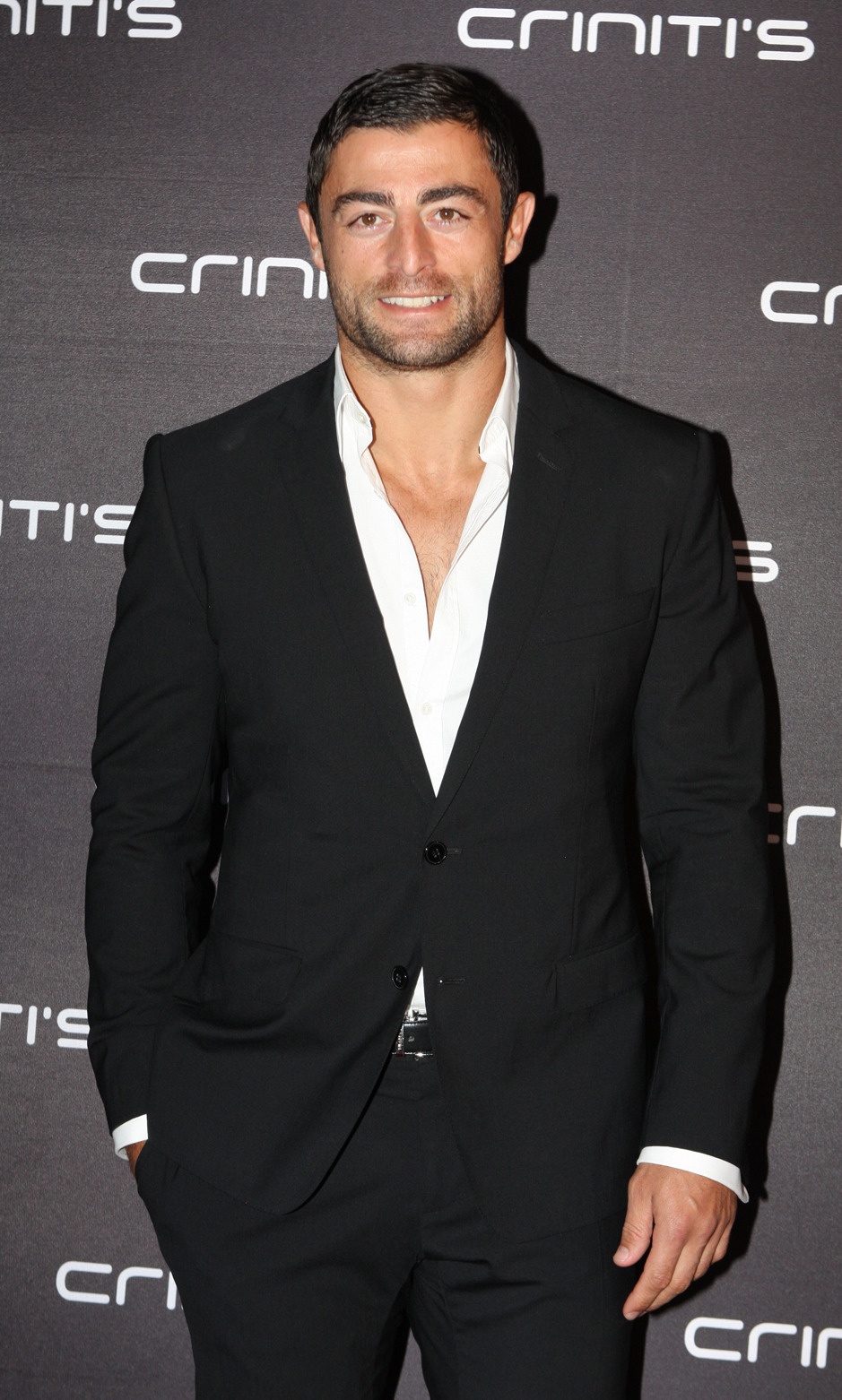
Minichiello in 2013

Team

- 2000 NRL Grand Final: Runners-up
- 2002 NRL Grand Final: Premiers
- 2003 World Club Challenge: Champions
- 2003 NRL Grand Final: Runners-up
- 2004 NRL Minor Premiers
- 2004 NRL Grand Final: Runners-up
- 2010 NRL Grand Final: Runners-up
- 2013 NRL Minor Premiers
- 2013 NRL Grand Final: Premiers
- 2014 World Club Challenge: Champions
- 2014 NRL Minor Premiers

=== Statistics ===
Season	Team	Pld	T	G	FG	Pts
2000	Sydney Roosters	24	7	0	0	28
2001	Sydney Roosters	26	14	0	0	56
2002	Sydney Roosters	26	16	0	0	64
2003	Sydney Roosters	25	10	0	0	40
2004	Sydney Roosters	25	18	0	0	72
2005	Sydney Roosters	22	14	0	0	56
2006	Sydney Roosters	6	4	0	0	16
2007	Sydney Roosters	10	2	0	1	9
2008	Sydney Roosters	9	3	0	0	12
2009	Sydney Roosters	8	1	0	0	4
2010	Sydney Roosters	26	12	0	0	48
2011	Sydney Roosters	20	6	0	0	24
2012	Sydney Roosters	24	9	0	0	36
2013	Sydney Roosters	24	6	0	0	24
2014	Sydney Roosters	27	17	0	0	68
	Totals	302	139	0	1	557

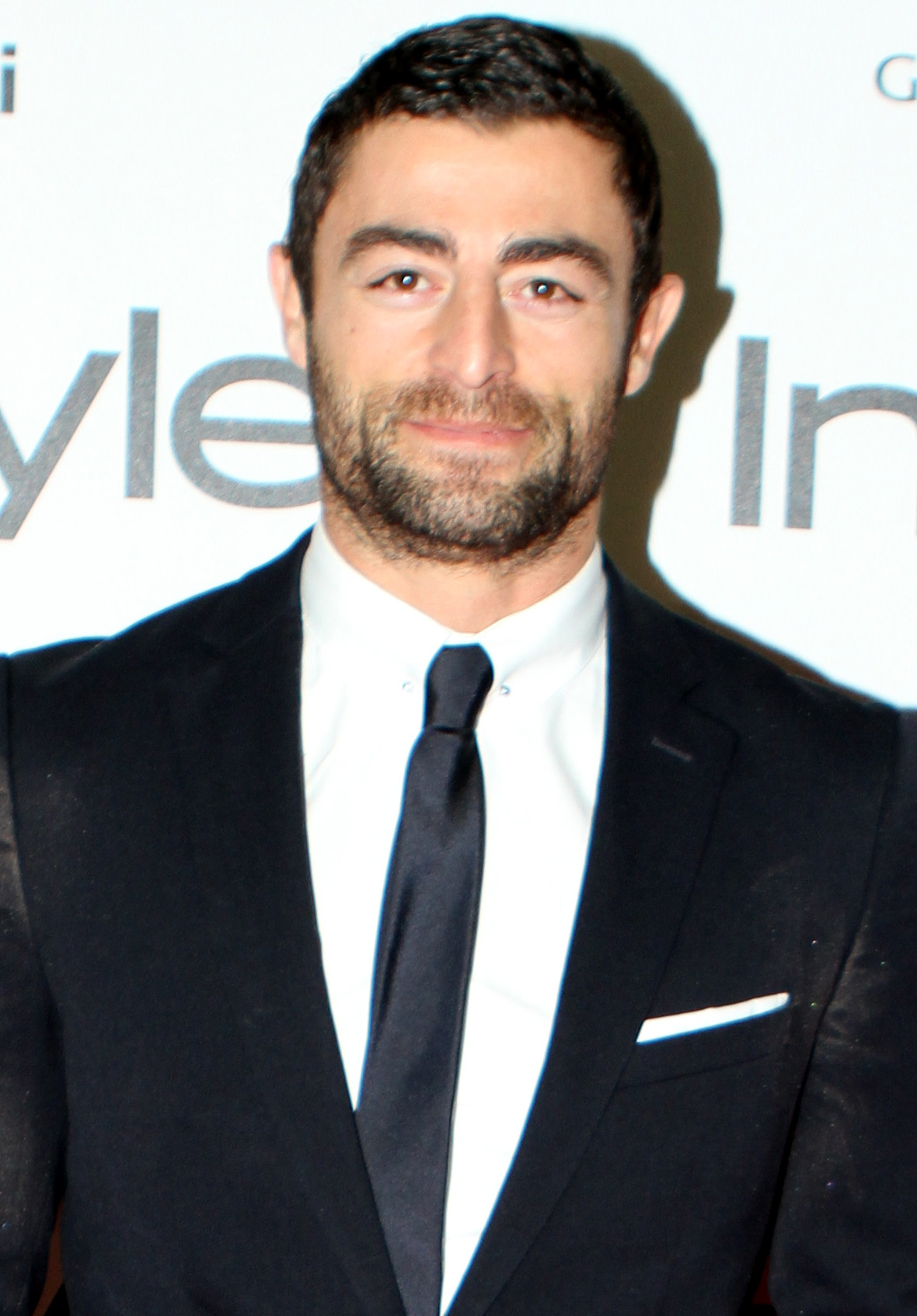
Minichiello in 2015

== Personal life ==
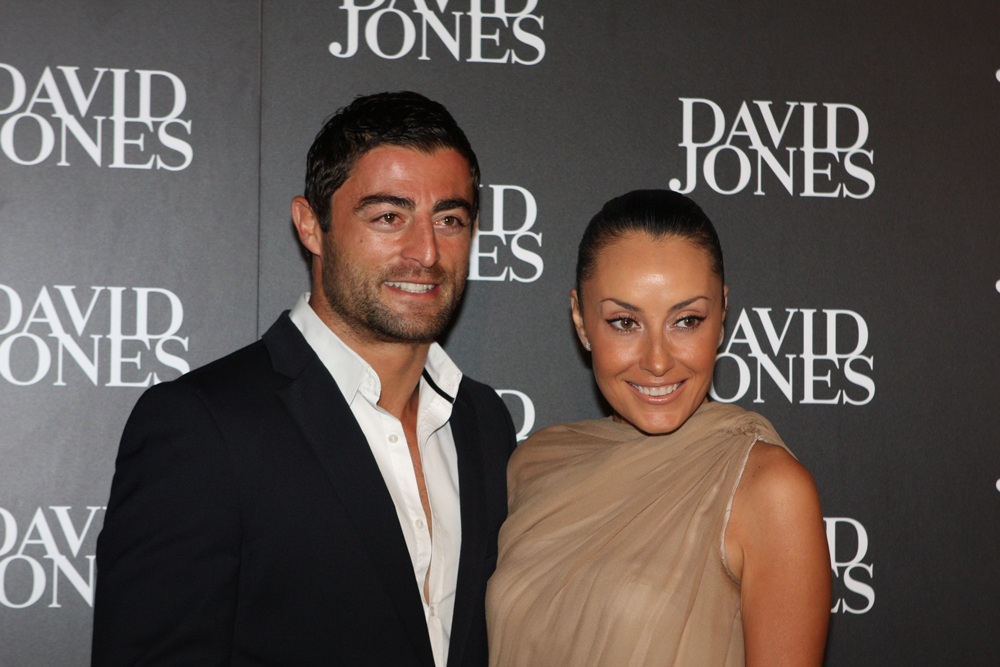
Minichiello and Terry Biviano in February 2012.

Formerly a gymnast, Minichiello was a finalist in the Sexiest Man in League contest for 2006, where he finished sixth with 7% of the vote. He was crowned the NRL's Most Wanted on The Footy Show in 2003, and with his brother Mark (who previously played for Hull FC, in the Super League), posed for Cosmopolitan magazine's Lonsdale Boys with Balls '06 feature.

He is the elder brother of Hull F.C. Second-rower Mark Minichiello. They are of Italian descent.

Minichiello was known by the nickname "The Count," given to him in 2001 by City Origin coach Brett Kenny, in reference to the character from Sesame Street. He also acquired the nickname "The Italian Mountain Cat" or "MinCat," which originated from a fan comment about his agility and was popularized by teammate Luke Ricketson.He is also known as "Mini".

On 22 January 2012, Anthony Minichiello wed Australian shoe-designer, Terry Biviano, in one of the most lavish ceremonies held at St Mary's Cathedral in Sydney. Biviano starred in the first season of WAG Nation, a reality show that documents the lives of five wives/girlfriends of Australian sportsmen.

As of 2012, Anthony has been a regular contributor to entertainment and lifestyle website Live4.

On 2 December 2013, Anthony's wife Terry Biviano gave birth to their first child, a girl named Azura Trésor.

Following his retirement from rugby league, Minichiello developed his business, Mini Fit, which he had registered in 2010. Mini Fit provides physical education programs and holiday clinics, primarily to schools. The business model often involves pairing a qualified PE teacher with an athlete, including young Roosters players and NRLW athletes, to deliver programs. Mini Fit has also expanded to offer programs in special needs schools.
