= 2014 Wests Tigers season =

The 2014 Wests Tigers season was the 15th season in the joint venture club's history. They competed in the 2014 NRL season.

== Ladder ==
2014 NRL season
Pos	Team	Pld	W	D	L	B	PF	PA	PD	Pts
1	Sydney Roosters	24	16	0	8	2	615	385	+230	36
2	Manly Warringah Sea Eagles	24	16	0	8	2	502	399	+103	36
3	South Sydney Rabbitohs (P)	24	15	0	9	2	585	361	+224	34
4	Penrith Panthers	24	15	0	9	2	506	426	+80	34
5	North Queensland Cowboys	24	14	0	10	2	596	406	+190	32
6	Melbourne Storm	24	14	0	10	2	536	460	+76	32
7	Canterbury-Bankstown Bulldogs	24	13	0	11	2	446	439	+7	30
8	Brisbane Broncos	24	12	0	12	2	549	456	+93	28
9	New Zealand Warriors	24	12	0	12	2	571	491	+80	28
10	Parramatta Eels	24	12	0	12	2	477	580	−103	28
11	St. George Illawarra Dragons	24	11	0	13	2	469	528	−59	26
12	Newcastle Knights	24	10	0	14	2	463	571	−108	24
13	Wests Tigers	24	10	0	14	2	420	631	−211	24
14	Gold Coast Titans	24	9	0	15	2	372	538	−166	22
15	Canberra Raiders	24	8	0	16	2	466	623	−157	20
16	Cronulla-Sutherland Sharks	24	5	0	19	2	334	613	−279	14
