= 2014 South Sydney Rabbitohs season =

- 2014 NRL premiers
- NRL Rank: 3rd
- Play-off result: Premiers
- 2014 record: Wins: 15; draws: 0; losses: 9
- Points scored: For: 585; against: 361

Team information
- CEO: Shane Richardson
- Head Coach: Michael Maguire
- Captain: John Sutton
- Stadium: ANZ Stadium
- Avg. attendance: 19,888
- High attendance: 43,255 v Canterbury, Rd 7

Top scorers
- Tries: Alex Johnston
- Goals: Adam Reynolds
- Points: Adam Reynolds
← 2013	List of seasons	2015 →

The 2014 South Sydney Rabbitohs season was the 105th in the club's history. Coached by Michael Maguire and captained by John Sutton, they competed in the National Rugby League's 2014 Telstra Premiership.

== Season summary ==
=== Milestones ===
On Sunday 5 October 2014, the South Sydney Rabbitohs finally ended their 43-year drought, and claimed the NRL Premiership Trophy after defeating the Canterbury-Bankstown Bulldogs in the Grand Final, 30–6.

== Squad Movement ==
=== Gains ===
Player	Signed from	Until end of	Notes
Glenn Stewart	Manly Warringah Sea Eagles	2016	
Tim Grant	Penrith Panthers	2018	
Cody Walker	Melbourne Storm	2016	

=== Losses ===
Player	2015 Club	Notes
Sam Burgess	Rugby Union	
Beau Champion	Parramatta Eels	
Apisai Koroisau	Penrith Panthers	
Nathan Merritt	Retired	
Lote Tuqiri	Retired	
Ben Te'o	Rugby Union	

=== Re-signings ===
Player	Club	Until end of	Notes
Jason Clark	South Sydney Rabbitohs	2016	
Issac Luke	South Sydney Rabbitohs	2017	Contract ended because of Lukes movement to New Zealand Warriors
Chris McQueen	South Sydney Rabbitohs	2016	

== Ladder ==
2014 NRL season
Pos	Team	Pld	W	D	L	B	PF	PA	PD	Pts
1	Sydney Roosters	24	16	0	8	2	615	385	+230	36
2	Manly Warringah Sea Eagles	24	16	0	8	2	502	399	+103	36
3	South Sydney Rabbitohs (P)	24	15	0	9	2	585	361	+224	34
4	Penrith Panthers	24	15	0	9	2	506	426	+80	34
5	North Queensland Cowboys	24	14	0	10	2	596	406	+190	32
6	Melbourne Storm	24	14	0	10	2	536	460	+76	32
7	Canterbury-Bankstown Bulldogs	24	13	0	11	2	446	439	+7	30
8	Brisbane Broncos	24	12	0	12	2	549	456	+93	28
9	New Zealand Warriors	24	12	0	12	2	571	491	+80	28
10	Parramatta Eels	24	12	0	12	2	477	580	−103	28
11	St. George Illawarra Dragons	24	11	0	13	2	469	528	−59	26
12	Newcastle Knights	24	10	0	14	2	463	571	−108	24
13	Wests Tigers	24	10	0	14	2	420	631	−211	24
14	Gold Coast Titans	24	9	0	15	2	372	538	−166	22
15	Canberra Raiders	24	8	0	16	2	466	623	−157	20
16	Cronulla-Sutherland Sharks	24	5	0	19	2	334	613	−279	14

== Fixtures ==
=== Pre-season ===
In 2014, the Rabbitohs again competed in three pre-season trial matches.

Date	Round	Opponent	Venue	Score	Attendance	Report
Sunday, 9 February	Back to Belmore	Canterbury-Bankstown Bulldogs	Belmore Sports Ground, Sydney	38 – 12	5,000	
Saturday, 22 February	Charity Shield	St. George Illawarra Dragons	WIN Stadium, Wollongong	38 – 20	14,633	
Legend: Win 13+ Win Loss 13+ Loss Draw

==== NRL Auckland Nines ====
The NRL Auckland Nines is a pre-season rugby league nines competition featuring all 16 NRL clubs. The 2014 competition was played over two days on 15 and 16 February at Eden Park in Auckland, New Zealand. The Rabbitohs featured in Pool Red and played the Panthers, Storm and Dragons. The top two teams of each pool qualified for the quarter finals.

===== Pool Play =====
Pos	Team	Pld	W	D	L	PF	PA	PD	Pts
1	Penrith Panthers	3	2	0	1	53	37	+16	4
2	South Sydney Rabbitohs	3	2	0	1	53	38	+15	4
3	Melbourne Storm	3	1	0	2	39	40	−1	2
4	St. George Illawarra Dragons	3	1	0	2	26	56	−30	2

=== Regular season ===
Round	Opponent	Score	Date	Time	Venue	Crowd	Pos.
Round 1	Sydney	28-8	March 6th	Thursday 8:05pm	ANZ Stadium	27,282	5th
Round 2	Manly	12-14	March 14th	Friday 7:40pm	Central Coast Stadium	15,120	8th
Round 3	Wests Tigers	16-25	March 21st	Friday 7:40pm	ANZ Stadium	20,061	10th
Round 4	Canberra	18-30	March 30th	Sunday 2:00pm	ANZ Stadium	16,032	14th
Round 5	St George Illawarra	26-6	April 5th	Saturday 7:30pm	Sydney Cricket Ground	24,368	3rd
Round 6	Penrith	18-2	April 11th	Friday 7:40pm	Sportingbet Stadium	11,674	7th
Round 7	Canterbury	14-15	April 18th	Friday 4:00pm	ANZ Stadium	43,255	11th
Round 8	Brisbane	28-26	April 25th	Friday 8:00pm	Suncorp Stadium	44,122	7th
Round 9	Gold Coast	40-18	May 10th	Saturday 5:30pm	Cbus Super Stadium	19,107	6th
Round 10	Melbourne	14-27	May 16th	Friday 7:40pm	ANZ Stadium	18,508	10th
Round 11	Cronulla	18-0	May 26th	Monday 7:00pm	Remondis Stadium	8,137	9th
Round 12	St George Illawarra	29-10	June 2nd	Monday 7:00pm	ANZ Stadium	11,771	5th
Round 13	Warriors	34-18	June 7th	Saturday 7:30pm	NIB Stadium	20,267	2nd
Round 14	Wests Tigers	32-10	June 13th	Friday 7:45pm	ANZ Stadium	20,721	2nd
Round 15 Bye
Round 16	North QLD	18-20	June 28th	Saturday 7:30pm	1300SMILES Stadium	15,897	4th
Round 17	Gold Coast	10-14	July 7th	Monday 7:00pm	ANZ Stadium	10,925	4th
Round 18 Bye
Round 19	Parramatta	32-12	July 18th	Friday 7:40pm	Pirtek Stadium	16,125	4th
Round 20	Canberra	34-18	July 28th	Monday 7:00pm	GIO Stadium	9,526	3rd
Round 21	Newcastle	50-10	August 3rd	Sunday 3:00pm	Barlow Park	11,578	2nd
Round 22	Manly	23-4	August 8th	Friday 7:45pm	Sydney Cricket Ground	27,062	1st
Round 23	Brisbane	42-16	August 14th	Thursday 7:45pm	ANZ Stadium	14,094	2nd
Round 24	North QLD	10-22	August 23rd	Saturday 7:30pm	ANZ Stadium	17,171	1st
Round 25	Canterbury	21-14	August 28th	Thursday 7:45pm	ANZ Stadium	20,424	3rd
Round 26	Sydney	18-22	September 4th	Thursday 7:45pm	Allianz Stadium	32,481	3rd
Qualifying Final	Manly	40-24	September 12th	Friday 7:55pm	Allianz Stadium	25,733	-
Preliminary Final	Sydney	32-22	September 26th	Friday 7:55pm	ANZ Stadium	52,592	-
Grand Final	Canterbury	30-6	October 5th	Sunday 7:20pm	ANZ Stadium	83,833	-

=== Finals ===
Qualifying and elimination finals
13 Sept, Allianz Stadium
1	Sydney	18
4	Penrith	19
13 Sept, 1300SMILES Stadium
5	North Queensland	32
8	Brisbane	20
14 Sept, AAMI Park
6	Melbourne	4
7	Canterbury-Bankstown	28
12 Sept, Allianz Stadium
2	Manly-Warringah	24
3	South Sydney	40

Semi-finals
19 Sept, Allianz Stadium
Sydney	31
North Queensland	30
20 Sept, Allianz Stadium
Canterbury-Bankstown	18
Manly-Warringah	17

Preliminary finals
27 Sept, ANZ Stadium
Penrith	12
Canterbury-Bankstown	18
26 Sept, ANZ Stadium
Sydney	22
South Sydney	32

Grand final
5 Oct, ANZ Stadium
Canterbury-Bankstown	6
South Sydney	30

== Grand final ==
Sunday, 5 October
7:35pm AEDT

South Sydney Rabbitohs
Tries
Lote Tuqiri(7') 0/1
Johnston (20') 1
G. Burgess (56') 1
Auva'a (73') 1
Reynolds (78') 1
Inglis (80') 1

Goals
Reynolds 5/7 (27' pen, 58', 64' pen, 75', 79')
S. Burgess 0/1

30 – 6

Canterbury-Bankstown Bulldogs
Tries
Williams (49') 1

Goals
Hodkinson 1/1 (51')

ANZ Stadium, Sydney
Attendance: 83,833
Referee: Shayne Hayne, Gerard Sutton
Clive Churchill Medal: Sam Burgess

== Player statistics ==
Player	Appearances	Tries	Goals	Field Goals	Total Points
–	–	–	–	–	–

== Representative honours ==
All Stars	ANZAC Test	Pacific Test	City / Country	State of Origin 1	State of Origin 2	State of Origin 3	Four Nations
N/A	(Australia) Greg Inglis	(Fiji) Lote Tuqiri	Adam Reynolds, Dylan Walker	Chris McQueen, Ben Te'o, Greg Inglis	Chris McQueen, Ben Te'o, Greg Inglis	Ben Te'o, Greg Inglis	(Australia) Greg Inglis, (Australia) Dylan Walker, (England) George Burgess, (England) Tom Burgess, (New Zealand) Issac Luke
