= 2014 Penrith Panthers season =

- NRL Rank: 4th
- Play-off result: Lost prelim-final (FW3)
- 2014 record: Wins: 16; losses: 10
- Points scored: For: 537; against: 462

Team information
- Coach: Ivan Cleary
- Captains: Kevin Kingston; Peter Wallace
- Stadium: Sportingbet Stadium – 22,500; Carrington Park – 13,000 (round 20 only)
- Avg. attendance: 11,462
- High attendance: 19,141 vs. Eels, round 12

Top scorers
- Tries: Josh Mansour (15)
- Goals: Jamie Soward (63)
- Points: Jamie Soward (155)
| ← 2013 | List of seasons | 2015 → |

The 2014 Penrith Panthers season was the 48th in the club's history. Coached by Ivan Cleary and co-captained by Kevin Kingston and Peter Wallace, the team competed in the National Rugby League's 2014 Telstra Premiership. The Panthers competed in the pre-season's 2014 NRL Auckland Nines. They completed the 26-round regular season 4th place (out of 16), reaching the finals for the first time since 2010. Penrith came within one match of the grand final but were knocked out by the Canterbury-Bankstown Bulldogs.

== Squad ==
Penrith Panthers
| NRL squad 2014 | | | Extended squad | Coaching staff |
|---|---|---|---|---|
| Sam Anderson – PR, LK; Lewis Brown – SR; Bryce Cartwright – SR; Adam Docker – SR; Tim Grant – PR; Jamal Idris – CE; Isaac John – FE; Kevin Kingston (c) – HK; Brent Kite – PR; Jeremy Latimore – PR; Josh Mansour – WG; Sika Manu – SR | Sam McKendry – PR; Kierran Moseley – HK; Matt Moylan – FB; Ben Murdoch-Masila – PR – Gain: 30 Apr; Kevin Naiqama – FB, WG; Tyrone Peachey – LK; Nigel Plum – PR; Matt Robinson – LK; James Segeyaro – HK; David Simmons – WG; Will Smith – FB, FE; Jamie Soward – FE, HB | Elijah Taylor – SR; Peter Wallace (c) – HB; Dallin Watene-Zelezniak – FB, WG; Dean Whare – CE; Isaah Yeo – SR | Wellington Albert – PR, WG; Luke Capewell – FB, FE; Anthony Cherrington – SR; Tom Eisenhuth – SR; Daniel Foster – HB; Tom Humble – FE; Eto Nabuli – WG; Wes Naiqama – FB; James Roberts – CE – Loss: 14 Mar; Ryan Simpkins – LK; Nathan Smith – LK; Shaun Spence – SR | Head coach: Ivan Cleary; Assistant coaches: David Fairleigh; Garth Brennan (NSW Cup Coach); Trent Barrett (NYC Coach); Legend: (c) Captain(s); (vc) Vice-captain(s) |

=== Player transfers ===
A † denotes that the transfer occurred during the 2014 season.

Gains
| Player | Signed from | Until end of | Notes |
|---|---|---|---|
| Wellington Albert | PNG Hunters (QLD Cup) | 2015 | |
| Jamal Idris | Gold Coast Titans | 2016 | |
| Brent Kite | Manly-Warringah Sea Eagles | 2015 | |
| Leilani Latu | Canterbury-Bankstown Bulldogs | 2015 | |
| Ben Murdoch-Masila† | Wests Tigers | 2015 | |
| Kevin Naiqama | Newcastle Knights | 2015 | |
| Tyrone Peachey | Cronulla-Sutherland Sharks | 2015 | |
| Will Smith | Newcastle Knights | 2015 | |
| Jamie Soward | London Broncos (Super League) | 2017 | |
| Shaun Spence | Wests Tigers | 2015 | |
| Elijah Taylor | New Zealand Warriors | 2016 | |
| Peter Wallace | Brisbane Broncos | 2016 | |

Losses
| Player | Signed from | Until end of | Notes |
|---|---|---|---|
| Blake Austin | Wests Tigers | 2015 | |
| Cameron Ciraldo | Retirement | – | |
| Lachlan Coote | North Queensland Cowboys | 2016 | |
| Mose Masoe | St Helens (Super League) | 2015 | |
| Clint Newton | Newcastle Knights | | |
| Kyle O'Donnell | Canberra Raiders | 2014 | |
| James Roberts† | Sacked, later Gold Coast Titans | | |
| Travis Robinson | Melbourne Storm | 2015 | |
| Brad Tighe | Gold Coast Titans | 2015 | |
| Luke Walsh | St Helens (Super League) | 2015 | |

== Fixtures ==
The Panthers again used Penrith Stadium as their home ground in 2014, now known as Sportingbet Stadium for sponsorship reasons.

=== Preseason ===
A 16-man squad was sent to Auckland and participated in the Auckland Nines competition. The Panthers played a trial match against the Newtown Jets on 23 February 2014.

== Ladder ==
2014 NRL season
| Pos | Team | Pld | W | D | L | B | PF | PA | PD | Pts |
|---|---|---|---|---|---|---|---|---|---|---|
| 1 | Sydney Roosters | 24 | 16 | 0 | 8 | 2 | 615 | 385 | +230 | 36 |
| 2 | Manly Warringah Sea Eagles | 24 | 16 | 0 | 8 | 2 | 502 | 399 | +103 | 36 |
| 3 | South Sydney Rabbitohs (P) | 24 | 15 | 0 | 9 | 2 | 585 | 361 | +224 | 34 |
| 4 | Penrith Panthers | 24 | 15 | 0 | 9 | 2 | 506 | 426 | +80 | 34 |
| 5 | North Queensland Cowboys | 24 | 14 | 0 | 10 | 2 | 596 | 406 | +190 | 32 |
| 6 | Melbourne Storm | 24 | 14 | 0 | 10 | 2 | 536 | 460 | +76 | 32 |
| 7 | Canterbury-Bankstown Bulldogs | 24 | 13 | 0 | 11 | 2 | 446 | 439 | +7 | 30 |
| 8 | Brisbane Broncos | 24 | 12 | 0 | 12 | 2 | 549 | 456 | +93 | 28 |
| 9 | New Zealand Warriors | 24 | 12 | 0 | 12 | 2 | 571 | 491 | +80 | 28 |
| 10 | Parramatta Eels | 24 | 12 | 0 | 12 | 2 | 477 | 580 | −103 | 28 |
| 11 | St. George Illawarra Dragons | 24 | 11 | 0 | 13 | 2 | 469 | 528 | −59 | 26 |
| 12 | Newcastle Knights | 24 | 10 | 0 | 14 | 2 | 463 | 571 | −108 | 24 |
| 13 | Wests Tigers | 24 | 10 | 0 | 14 | 2 | 420 | 631 | −211 | 24 |
| 14 | Gold Coast Titans | 24 | 9 | 0 | 15 | 2 | 372 | 538 | −166 | 22 |
| 15 | Canberra Raiders | 24 | 8 | 0 | 16 | 2 | 466 | 623 | −157 | 20 |
| 16 | Cronulla-Sutherland Sharks | 24 | 5 | 0 | 19 | 2 | 334 | 613 | −279 | 14 |

== Representative honours ==
=== Domestic ===
| Pos. | Player | Team | Call-up | Ref. |
|---|---|---|---|---|
| BE | Tim Grant | NSW City | 2014 City vs Country Origin | |
| FB | Matt Moylan | NSW City | 2014 City vs Country Origin | |
| LK | Adam Docker | NSW Country | 2014 City vs Country Origin | |
| CE | Jamal Idris | NSW Country | 2014 City vs Country Origin | |
| WG | Josh Mansour | Prime Minister's XIII | 2014 Prime Minister's XIII match | |
| FB | Matt Moylan | Prime Minister's XIII | 2014 Prime Minister's XIII match | |

=== International ===
| Pos. | Player | Team | Call-up | Ref. |
|---|---|---|---|---|
| BE | Isaac John | New Zealand | 2014 Anzac Test | |
| CE | Dean Whare | New Zealand | 2014 Anzac Test | |
| 18 | Waqa Blake | Fiji | 2014 Pacific Test vs Samoa | |
| BE | Reagan Campbell-Gillard | Fiji | 2014 Pacific Test vs Samoa | |
| WG | Eto Nabuli | Fiji | 2014 Pacific Test vs Samoa | |
| FB | Kevin Naiqama | Fiji | 2014 Pacific Test vs Samoa | |
| HB | Daniel Foster | Tonga | 2014 Test vs Papua New Guinea | |
| SR | Sika Manu | Tonga | 2014 Test vs Papua New Guinea | |
| LK | Ben Murdoch-Masila | Tonga | 2014 Test vs Papua New Guinea | |
| PR | Reagan Campbell-Gillard | Fiji | 2014 Hayne/Mannah Cup vs Lebanon | |
| CE | Wes Naiqama | Fiji | 2014 Hayne/Mannah Cup vs Lebanon | |
| WG | Josh Mansour | Australia | 2014 Four Nations | |
| 18 | Matt Moylan | Australia | 2014 Four Nations | |
| BE | Lewis Brown | New Zealand | 2014 Four Nations | |
| 18 | Dallin Watene-Zelezniak | New Zealand | 2014 Four Nations | |
| CE | Dean Whare | New Zealand | 2014 Four Nations | |
