= 2014 NRL season =

107th season of professional rugby league in Australia

2014 National Rugby League
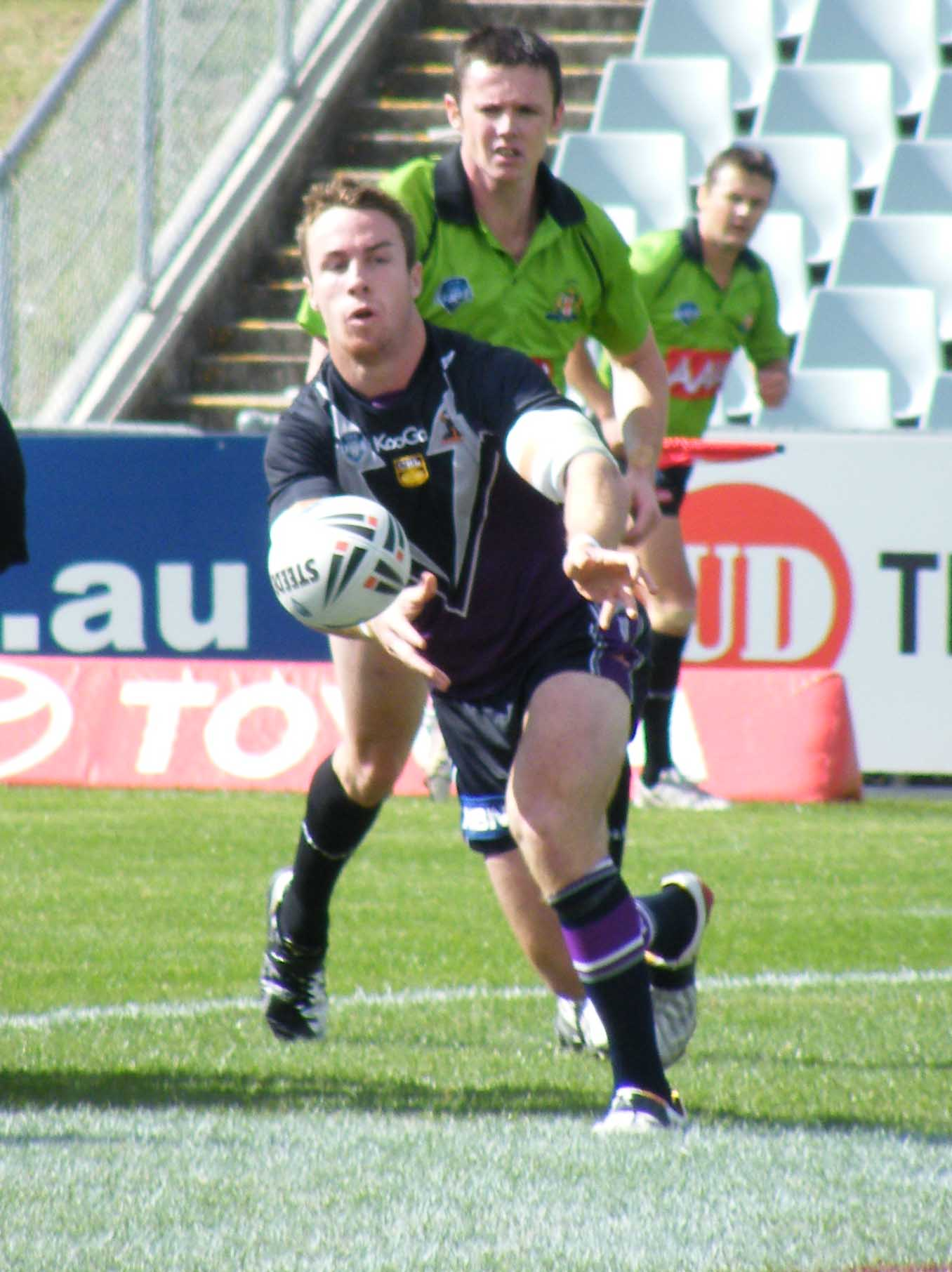
- James Maloney, the top goal scorer, in 2009
- Duration: March 6 – October 5, 2014
- Teams: 16
- Premiers: South Sydney Rabbitohs (21st title)
- Minor premiers: Sydney Roosters (18th title)
- Matches played: 201
- Points scored: 8308
- Average attendance: 16,798
- Total attendance: 3,376,409
- Top points scorer: Johnathan Thurston (208)
- Wooden spoon: Cronulla Sharks (3rd spoon)
- Dally M Medal: Johnathan Thurston & Jarryd Hayne
- Top try-scorer: Alex Johnston (21)

The 2014 NRL season was the 107th season of professional rugby league in Australia and the 17th season of the National Rugby League in Australia and New Zealand. The season started in New Zealand, for the Auckland Nines, replacing the Rugby League All Stars Match for the year, in the pre-season. After 26 rounds of the regular season, the Sydney Roosters were again crowned minor premiers and the competition had been reduced to a top eight teams to contest the finals series. The grand final was won by the South Sydney Rabbitohs, ending a 43-year premiership drought, winning 30–6 against the Canterbury-Bankstown Bulldogs.

== Teams ==
The lineup of teams remained unchanged for the 8th consecutive year. The 2014 season also presents a record 7 teams naming co-captains. The NRL's salary cap for the clubs' top 25 players was $A6.3M for 2014.

Colours	Club	Season	Home ground(s)	Head coach	Captain(s)
	Brisbane Broncos	27th season	Suncorp Stadium	Anthony Griffin	Corey Parker & Justin Hodges
	Canterbury-Bankstown Bulldogs	80th season	ANZ Stadium	Des Hasler	Michael Ennis & Frank Pritchard
	Canberra Raiders	33rd season	GIO Stadium Canberra	Ricky Stuart	Terry Campese→Brett White & Jarrod Croker
	Cronulla-Sutherland Sharks	48th season	Remondis Stadium	~~Shane Flanagan~~ (Suspended) → Peter Sharp (Resigned) → James Shepherd	~~Paul Gallen~~ & ~~Wade Graham~~ → Jeff Robson
	Gold Coast Titans	8th season	Cbus Super Stadium	John Cartwright→Neil Henry	Nate Myles & Greg Bird
	Manly Warringah Sea Eagles	65th season	Brookvale Oval	Geoff Toovey	Jamie Lyon & Jason King
	Melbourne Storm	17th season	AAMI Park	Craig Bellamy	Cameron Smith
	Newcastle Knights	27th season	Hunter Stadium	Wayne Bennett	Kurt Gidley
	New Zealand Warriors	20th season	Mt. Smart Stadium	Matthew Elliott→Andrew McFadden	Simon Mannering
	North Queensland Cowboys	20th season	1300SMILES Stadium	Paul Green	Johnathan Thurston & Matt Scott
	Parramatta Eels	68th season	Parramatta Stadium	Brad Arthur	Jarryd Hayne & Tim Mannah
	Penrith Panthers	48th season	Centrebet Stadium	Ivan Cleary	Kevin Kingston & Peter Wallace →Brent Kite & Jamie Soward
	St. George Illawarra Dragons	16th season	WIN Jubilee Oval & WIN Stadium	Steve Price→Paul McGregor	Ben Creagh
	South Sydney Rabbitohs	105th season	ANZ Stadium	Michael Maguire	John Sutton
	Sydney Roosters	107th season	Allianz Stadium	Trent Robinson	Anthony Minichiello
	Wests Tigers	15th season	Campbelltown Stadium & Leichhardt Oval	Mick Potter	Robbie Farah

== Pre-season ==
The 2014 pre-season featured the inaugural Auckland Nines competition, held over a weekend at Auckland's Eden Park. Hailed a success with its large attendances, the tournament was won by North Queensland Cowboys, claiming their first piece of silverware. The following weekend the 2014 World Club Challenge was played in Sydney, the first time the match was held outside England since 1994, with the Sydney Roosters defeating the Wigan Warriors convincingly.

Unlike previous seasons' advertising campaigns that featured a pop song, in 2014 the NRL's You're the difference was a spoken-word piece that focused on the game's fans. The NRL's official season launch was on 26 February at the Sydney Exhibition Centre and featured Roosters captain Anthony Minichiello speaking as the face of the game.

In the annual pre-season Charity Shield match, the Dragons hosted the Rabbitohs but were beaten.

== Regular season ==
The regular season commenced on Thursday, 6 March in Sydney between the South Sydney Rabbitohs and the Sydney Roosters. A number of themed rounds featured in the 2014 season, including Men of League Heritage Round (round 5), Women in League Round (round 10), and Indigenous Round (round 23). In addition, the NRL chose to designate round 19 as 'Rise for Alex' round in order to allow the rugby league community to show their support for Newcastle Knights player Alex McKinnon, who suffered a severe neck injury in round 3. One dollar from each ticket sold across all eight games were donated to support McKinnon's recovery, where it raised over $147,000 in total.

For the first time in the code's 106-year history, not one player was sent off from the field during the regular season.

Team	1	2	3	4	5	6	7	8	9	10	11	12	13	14	15	16	17	18	19	20	21	22	23	24	25	26	F1	F2	F3	GF
Brisbane Broncos	**CBY**; **6**	NQL; 4	SYD; 4	SGI; 16	PAR; 7	**GCT**; **4**	**NEW**; **26**	SOU; 2	**NQL**; **13**	GCT; 14	**WTI**; **2**	MAN; 26	**CAN**; **24**	X	**NZL**; **9**	CRO; 2	X	**PEN**; **1**	NZL; 6	MEL; 22	**MAN**; **12**	CBY; 31	**SOU**; **26**	NEW; 42	SGI; 8	**MEL**; **10**	**NQL**; **12**			
Canberra Raiders	**NQL**; **6**	**NEW**; **6**	GCT; 12	**SOU**; **12**	**PEN**; **6**	NEW; 14	MEL; 2	**MAN**; **36**	**NZL**; **42**	PEN; 6	NQL; 30	**SYD**; **14**	BRI; 24	X	CBY; 8	**WTI**; **1**	X	**GCT**; **16**	**MEL**; **14**	SOU; 16	NZL; 36	**PAR**; **8**	SGI; 18	**CRO**; **10**	WTI; 15	PAR; 13				
Canterbury Bankstown Bulldogs	BRI; 6	CRO; 38	**PEN**; **2**	MEL; 28	**SYD**; **1**	**NZL**; **1**	**SOU**; **1**	NEW; 4	**SGI**; **32**	NZL; 4	SYD; 20	X	**MAN**; **22**	PAR; 10	**CAN**; **8**	X	MAN; 7	**MEL**; **2**	**WTI**; **28**	NQL; 8	PEN; 6	**BRI**; **31**	**PAR**; **2**	WTI; 20	SOU; 7	**GCT**; **1**	**MEL**; **24**	**MAN**; **1**	**PEN**; **6**	**SOU**; **24**
Cronulla-Sutherland Sharks	GCT; 6	**CBY**; **38**	SGI; 2	**NEW**; **30**	NZL; 31	**MAN**; **20**	SYD; 6	PEN; 4	**PAR**; **18**	WTI; 2	SOU; 18	X	**SGI**; **30**	X	MAN; 26	**BRI**; **2**	**SYD**; **2**	NEW; 13	NQL; 18	**PEN**; **2**	PAR; 20	**NZL**; **4**	**MEL**; **42**	CAN; 10	**NQL**; **1**	**WTI**; **16**				
Gold Coast Titans	**CRO**; **6**	WTI; 30	**CAN**; **12**	NQL; 1	**MEL**; **2**	BRI; 4	**PEN**; **2**	**WTI**; **16**	SOU; 22	**BRI**; **14**	NZL; 8	X	PEN; 22	MEL; 4	SGI; 1	X	**SOU**; **4**	CAN; 16	**NEW**; **14**	PAR; 6	**NQL**; **20**	**SYD**; **8**	MAN; 3	**SGI**; **28**	**NZL**; **42**	CBY; 1				
Manly Warringah Sea Eagles	MEL; 1	SOU; 2	PAR; 4	**SYD**; **8**	**WTI**; **16**	CRO; 20	NQL; 5	CAN; 36	**MEL**; **3**	NEW; 1	X	**BRI**; **26**	CBY; 22	X	**CRO**; **26**	SYD; 8	**CBY**; **7**	WTI; 32	**SGI**; **9**	**NZL**; **10**	BRI; 12	**SOU**; **19**	**GCT**; **3**	**PAR**; **10**	PEN; 1	**NQL**; **14**	SOU; 16	CBY; 1		
Melbourne Storm	**MAN**; **1**	PEN; 1	NEW; 8	**CBY**; **28**	GCT; 2	SGI; 4	**CAN**; **2**	NZL; 6	MAN; 3	**SOU**; **13**	X	**NQL**; **22**	SYD; 20	**GCT**; **4**	PAR; 26	**SGI**; **12**	X	CBY; 2	CAN; 14	**BRI**; **22**	**WTI**; **22**	**NEW**; **2**	CRO; 42	**PEN**; **14**	**SYD**; **12**	BRI; 10	CBY; 24			
Newcastle Knights	**PEN**; **22**	CAN; 6	**MEL**; **8**	CRO; 30	**NQL**; **26**	**CAN**; **14**	BRI; 26	**CBY**; **4**	PEN; 22	**MAN**; **1**	X	**NZL**; **20**	WTI; 3	**SYD**; **17**	NQL; 8	**PAR**; **6**	X	**CRO**; **13**	GCT; 14	SYD; 4	**SOU**; **40**	MEL; 2	NZL; 6	**BRI**; **42**	PAR; 30	SGI; 30				
New Zealand Warriors	**PAR**; **20**	SGI; 19	**NQL**; **4**	WTI; 24	**CRO**; **31**	CBY; 1	**SGI**; **10**	**MEL**; **6**	CAN; 42	**CBY**; **4**	**GCT**; **8**	NEW; 20	**SOU**; **16**	X	BRI; 9	PEN; 10	X	PAR; 48	**BRI**; **6**	MAN; 10	**CAN**; **36**	CRO; 4	**NEW**; **6**	SYD; 34	GCT; 42	**PEN**; **16**				
North Queensland Cowboys	CAN; 6	**BRI**; **4**	NZL; 4	**GCT**; **1**	NEW; 26	**WTI**; **12**	**MAN**; **5**	PAR; 28	BRI; 13	SYD; 32	**CAN**; **30**	MEL; 22	**PAR**; **2**	X	**NEW**; **8**	SOU; 2	**SGI**; **3**	X	**CRO**; **18**	**CBY**; **8**	GCT; 20	WTI; 58	**PEN**; **1**	**SOU**; **12**	CRO; 1	MAN; 14	BRI; 12	**SYD**; **1**		
Parramatta Eels	NZL; 20	**SYD**; **52**	**MAN**; **4**	PEN; 16	**BRI**; **7**	SYD; 2	WTI; 3	**NQL**; **28**	CRO; 18	SGI; 36	X	**PEN**; **26**	NQL; 2	**CBY**; **10**	**MEL**; **26**	NEW; 6	X	**NZL**; **48**	SOU; 20	**GCT**; **6**	**CRO**; **20**	CAN; 8	CBY; 2	MAN; 10	**NEW**; **30**	**CAN**; **13**				
Penrith Panthers	NEW; 22	**MEL**; **1**	CBY; 2	**PAR**; **16**	CAN; 6	SOU; 16	GCT; 2	**CRO**; **4**	**NEW**; **22**	**CAN**; **6**	X	PAR; 26	**GCT**; **22**	SGI; 4	X	**NZL**; **10**	**WTI**; **16**	BRI; 1	**SYD**; **20**	CRO; 2	**CBY**; **6**	**SGI**; **12**	NQL; 1	MEL; 14	**MAN**; **1**	NZL; 16	**SYD**; **1**	X	CBY; 6	
South Sydney Rabbitohs	SYD; 20	**MAN**; **2**	**WTI**; **9**	CAN; 12	**SGI**; **20**	**PEN**; **16**	CBY; 1	**BRI**; **2**	**GCT**; **22**	MEL; 13	**CRO**; **18**	SGI; 19	NZL; 16	WTI; 22	X	**NQL**; **2**	GCT; 4	X	**PAR**; **20**	**CAN**; **16**	NEW; 40	MAN; 19	BRI; 26	NQL; 12	**CBY**; **7**	**SYD**; **4**	**MAN**; **16**	X	SYD; 10	CBY; 24
St. George Illawarra Dragons	WTI; 20	**NZL**; **19**	**CRO**; **2**	BRI; 16	SOU; 20	**MEL**; **4**	NZL; 10	SYD; 20	CBY; 32	**PAR**; **36**	X	**SOU**; **19**	CRO; 30	**PEN**; **4**	**GCT**; **1**	MEL; 12	NQL; 3	X	MAN; 9	**WTI**; **16**	**SYD**; **8**	PEN; 12	**CAN**; **18**	GCT; 28	**BRI**; **8**	**NEW**; **30**				
Sydney Roosters	**SOU**; **20**	PAR; 52	**BRI**; **4**	MAN; 8	CBY; 1	**PAR**; **2**	**CRO**; **6**	**SGI**; **20**	WTI; 24	**NQL**; **32**	**CBY**; **20**	CAN; 14	**MEL**; **20**	NEW; 17	X	**MAN**; **8**	CRO; 2	X	PEN; 20	**NEW**; **4**	SGI; 8	GCT; 8	**WTI**; **44**	**NZL**; **34**	MEL; 12	SOU; 4	PEN; 1	NQL; 1	**SOU**; **10**	
Wests Tigers	**SGI**; **20**	**GCT**; **30**	SOU; 9	**NZL**; **24**	MAN; 16	NQL; 12	**PAR**; **3**	GCT; 16	**SYD**; **24**	**CRO**; **2**	BRI; 2	X	**NEW**; **3**	**SOU**; **22**	X	CAN; 1	PEN; 16	**MAN**; **32**	CBY; 28	SGI; 16	MEL; 22	**NQL**; **58**	SYD; 44	**CBY**; **20**	**CAN**; **15**	CRO; 16				
Team	1	2	3	4	5	6	7	8	9	10	11	12	13	14	15	16	17	18	19	20	21	22	23	24	25	26	F1	F2	F3	GF

Bold – Opposition's Home game
X – Bye
Opponent for round listed above margin

== Ladder ==
2014 NRL season
Pos	Team	Pld	W	D	L	B	PF	PA	PD	Pts
1	Sydney Roosters	24	16	0	8	2	615	385	+230	36
2	Manly Warringah Sea Eagles	24	16	0	8	2	502	399	+103	36
3	South Sydney Rabbitohs (P)	24	15	0	9	2	585	361	+224	34
4	Penrith Panthers	24	15	0	9	2	506	426	+80	34
5	North Queensland Cowboys	24	14	0	10	2	596	406	+190	32
6	Melbourne Storm	24	14	0	10	2	536	460	+76	32
7	Canterbury-Bankstown Bulldogs	24	13	0	11	2	446	439	+7	30
8	Brisbane Broncos	24	12	0	12	2	549	456	+93	28
9	New Zealand Warriors	24	12	0	12	2	571	491	+80	28
10	Parramatta Eels	24	12	0	12	2	477	580	−103	28
11	St. George Illawarra Dragons	24	11	0	13	2	469	528	−59	26
12	Newcastle Knights	24	10	0	14	2	463	571	−108	24
13	Wests Tigers	24	10	0	14	2	420	631	−211	24
14	Gold Coast Titans	24	9	0	15	2	372	538	−166	22
15	Canberra Raiders	24	8	0	16	2	466	623	−157	20
16	Cronulla-Sutherland Sharks	24	5	0	19	2	334	613	−279	14

=== Ladder progression ===
- Numbers highlighted in green indicate that the team finished the round inside the top 8.
- Numbers highlighted in blue indicates the team finished first on the ladder in that round.
- Numbers highlighted in red indicates the team finished last place on the ladder in that round.
- Underlined numbers indicate that the team had a bye during that round.

	Team	1	2	3	4	5	6	7	8	9	10	11	12	13	14	15	16	17	18	19	20	21	22	23	24	25	26
1	Sydney	0	2	4	4	4	4	6	8	10	10	12	14	16	18	20	20	20	22	24	24	26	28	30	32	34	36
2	Manly-Warringah	0	2	4	6	6	8	10	12	12	14	16	16	18	20	22	24	24	26	28	30	32	32	34	34	36	36
3	South Sydney	2	2	2	2	4	6	6	8	10	10	12	14	16	18	20	20	20	22	24	26	28	30	32	32	34	34
4	Penrith	2	2	4	4	6	6	8	8	10	12	14	16	18	20	22	22	24	26	26	26	28	30	32	32	32	34
5	North Queensland	2	2	2	2	4	4	4	6	8	10	10	12	12	14	14	16	16	18	20	22	24	26	26	28	30	32
6	Melbourne	2	4	6	6	6	8	8	8	10	12	14	14	14	16	18	18	20	20	22	24	26	26	28	30	30	32
7	Canterbury-Bankstown	0	2	2	4	6	8	10	12	14	16	16	18	18	18	20	22	24	26	26	26	26	26	28	30	30	30
8	Brisbane	2	4	4	6	6	6	8	8	8	10	12	14	16	18	18	18	20	20	22	22	22	24	24	26	28	28
9	New Zealand	0	0	2	4	4	4	4	6	8	8	10	12	12	14	16	18	20	22	22	22	24	26	26	26	28	28
10	Parramatta	2	2	2	4	6	8	8	8	10	12	14	14	16	18	18	18	20	20	20	22	24	26	26	28	28	28
11	St. George Illawarra	2	4	6	6	6	6	8	8	8	8	10	10	12	12	14	16	18	20	20	22	22	22	24	26	26	26
12	Newcastle	0	0	0	2	2	4	4	4	4	4	6	6	6	6	8	10	12	14	14	16	16	18	20	20	22	24
13	Wests	0	2	4	4	6	8	10	10	10	12	12	14	16	16	18	20	20	20	22	22	22	22	22	22	22	24
14	Gold Coast	2	2	4	6	8	10	10	12	12	12	12	14	14	14	14	16	18	18	20	20	20	20	20	20	20	22
15	Canberra	0	2	2	4	4	4	6	6	6	6	8	8	8	10	10	10	12	14	14	14	14	14	14	16	18	20
16	Cronulla-Sutherland	0	0	0	0	2	2	2	4	4	4	4	6	6	8	8	10	12	12	12	14	14	14	14	14	14	14

== Finals series ==
For the third year the NRL uses the finals system previously implemented by the ARL competition from the 1990s (also used as the AFL finals system) to decide the grand finalists from the top eight finishing teams. All but two teams retained a top-eight position to feature in this season's finals series. The Brisbane Broncos made a return after finishing 12th in 2013, whilst the Penrith Panthers made their first finals appearance since 2010 and only the second time since 2004. By failing to qualify, the Canberra Raiders missed the finals in consecutive seasons for the first time since 1986.

By the time of the 2014 NRL Grand final list-determining preliminary finals, the top four finishing teams remained except for the 2nd-placed Sea Eagles, who'd been replaced by the 7th-placed Bulldogs.

Home	Score	Away	Match Information
Home	Score	Away	Date and Time (Local)	Venue	Referees	Crowd
QUALIFYING & ELIMINATION FINALS
Manly Warringah Sea Eagles	24 – 40	South Sydney Rabbitohs	12 September 2014, 8:00 pm	Allianz Stadium	Shayne Hayne; Gavin Badger	25,733
Sydney Roosters	18 – 19	Penrith Panthers	13 September 2014, 5:55 pm	Allianz Stadium	Jared Maxwell; Henry Perenara	23,449
North Queensland Cowboys	32 – 20	Brisbane Broncos	13 September 2014, 7:55 pm	1300SMILES Stadium	Gerard Sutton; Ben Cummins	25,120
Melbourne Storm	4 – 28	Canterbury-Bankstown Bulldogs	14 September 2014, 4:10 pm	AAMI Park	Matt Cecchin; Gavin Morris	19,230
SEMI FINALS
Sydney Roosters	31 – 30	North Queensland Cowboys	19 September 2014, 8:00 pm	Allianz Stadium	Shayne Hayne; Gavin Badger	18,355
Manly Warringah Sea Eagles	17 – 18	Canterbury-Bankstown Bulldogs †	20 September 2014, 7:50 pm	Allianz Stadium	Gerard Sutton; Ben Cummins	28,186
PRELIMINARY FINALS
South Sydney Rabbitohs	32 – 22	Sydney Roosters	26 September 2014, 8:00 pm	ANZ Stadium	Gerard Sutton; Ben Cummins	52,592
Penrith Panthers	12 – 18	Canterbury-Bankstown Bulldogs	27 September 2014, 8:00 pm	ANZ Stadium	Shayne Hayne; Gavin Badger	46,168

† Match decided in golden point extra time.

=== Chart ===
Qualifying and elimination finals
13 Sept, Allianz Stadium
1	Sydney	18
4	Penrith	19
13 Sept, 1300SMILES Stadium
5	North Queensland	32
8	Brisbane	20
14 Sept, AAMI Park
6	Melbourne	4
7	Canterbury-Bankstown	28
12 Sept, Allianz Stadium
2	Manly-Warringah	24
3	South Sydney	40

Semi-finals
19 Sept, Allianz Stadium
Sydney	31
North Queensland	30
20 Sept, Allianz Stadium
Canterbury-Bankstown	18
Manly-Warringah	17

Preliminary finals
27 Sept, ANZ Stadium
Penrith	12
Canterbury-Bankstown	18
26 Sept, ANZ Stadium
South Sydney	32
Sydney	22

Grand final
5 Oct, ANZ Stadium
Canterbury-Bankstown	6
South Sydney	30

== Grand final ==
Sunday, 5 October
7:35pm (AEDT)

South Sydney Rabbitohs	30 – 6	Canterbury Bankstown Bulldogs
Tries: Alex Johnston (20') 1 George Burgess (56') 1 Kirisome Auva'a (73') 1 Adam Reynolds (78') 1 Greg Inglis (80') 1 Goals: Adam Reynolds 5/7 (27' pen, 57', 64' pen, 75', 79'); Sam Burgess 0/1	1st: 6 - 0; 2nd: 24 - 6	Tries: 1 (49') Tony Williams; Goals: 1/1 (50') Trent Hodkinson

ANZ Stadium
Attendance: 83,833
Clive Churchill Medal: Sam Burgess
Referee: Shayne Hayne, Gerard Sutton

== Regular season player statistics ==
The following statistics are of the conclusion of round 26.

- South Sydney's winger Lote Tuqiri was the oldest player in the 2014 NRL Season at the age of 35, he is three days older than Parramatta's Fuifui Moimoi

Top 5 point scorers

Points	Player	Tries	Goals	Field Goals
208	Johnathan Thurston	10	82	4
207	James Maloney	4	95	1
202	Jarrod Croker	18	65	0
175	Adam Reynolds	4	78	3
163	Shaun Johnson	9	63	1

Top 5 try scorers

Tries	Player
21	Alex Johnston
20	Jarryd Hayne
19	Semi Radradra
18	Jarrod Croker
17	Peta Hiku
17	Sisa Waqa
17	Manu Vatuvei

Top 5 goal scorers

Goals	Player
95	James Maloney
82	Johnathan Thurston
78	Adam Reynolds
68	Cameron Smith
65	Jamie Lyon
65	Jarrod Croker

Top 5 tacklers

Tackles	Player
1,074	Nathan Friend
1,060	Andrew McCullough
974	Matt Ballin
940	Jake Friend
923	Cameron Smith

== 2014 Transfers ==
=== Players ===
Player	2013 Club	2014 Club
Scott Anderson	Brisbane Broncos	Super League: Wakefield Trinity Wildcats
Dunamis Lui	Brisbane Broncos	Manly Warringah Sea Eagles
Corey Norman	Brisbane Broncos	Parramatta Eels
Scott Prince	Brisbane Broncos	Retirement
Lama Tasi	Brisbane Broncos	Super League: Salford Red Devils
Peter Wallace	Brisbane Broncos	Penrith Panthers
Shaun Berrigan	Canberra Raiders	Retirement
Sandor Earl	Canberra Raiders	Suspension
Blake Ferguson	Canberra Raiders	N/A
Sam Mataora	Canberra Raiders	Newcastle Knights
Joe Picker	Canberra Raiders	South Sydney Rabbitohs
Joel Thompson	Canberra Raiders	St. George Illawarra Dragons
Sam Williams	Canberra Raiders	St. George Illawarra Dragons
Ben Barba	Canterbury-Bankstown Bulldogs	Brisbane Broncos
Dene Halatau	Canterbury-Bankstown Bulldogs	Wests Tigers
Kris Keating	Canterbury-Bankstown Bulldogs	Super League: Hull Kingston Rovers
Joel Romelo	Canterbury-Bankstown Bulldogs	Melbourne Storm
Steve Turner	Canterbury-Bankstown Bulldogs	Retirement
Jayson Bukuya	Cronulla-Sutherland Sharks	New Zealand Warriors
Jon Green	Cronulla-Sutherland Sharks	Redcliffe Dolphins (Intrust Super Cup)
Ben Pomeroy	Cronulla-Sutherland Sharks	Super League: Catalans Dragons
Ben Ross	Cronulla-Sutherland Sharks	Retirement
Mark Taufua	Cronulla-Sutherland Sharks	Retirement
Matthew Wright	Cronulla-Sutherland Sharks	North Queensland Cowboys
Jordan Atkins	Gold Coast Titans	Super League: London Broncos
Jamal Idris	Gold Coast Titans	Penrith Panthers
Luke O'Dwyer	Gold Coast Titans	Retirement
Richie Faʻaoso	Manly Warringah Sea Eagles	N/A
Joe Galuvao	Manly Warringah Sea Eagles	Retirement
David Gower	Manly Warringah Sea Eagles	Parramatta Eels
Brent Kite	Manly Warringah Sea Eagles	Penrith Panthers
George Rose	Manly Warringah Sea Eagles	Melbourne Storm
Maurice Blair	Melbourne Storm	Gold Coast Titans
Brett Finch	Melbourne Storm	Retirement
Jason Ryles	Melbourne Storm	Retirement
Junior Sa'u	Melbourne Storm	Super League: Salford Red Devils
Lagi Setu	Melbourne Storm	N/A
Siosaia Vave	Melbourne Storm	Cronulla-Sutherland Sharks
Gareth Widdop	Melbourne Storm	St. George Illawarra Dragons
Danny Buderus	Newcastle Knights	Retirement
Neville Costigan	Newcastle Knights	Super League: Hull Kingston Rovers
Craig Gower	Newcastle Knights	Retirement
Matt Hilder	Newcastle Knights	Retirement
Anthony Quinn	Newcastle Knights	Retirement
Kevin Locke	New Zealand Warriors	Super League: Salford Red Devils
Todd Lowrie	New Zealand Warriors	Brisbane Broncos
Russell Packer	New Zealand Warriors	Imprisonment
Steve Rapira	New Zealand Warriors	Super League: Salford Red Devils
Elijah Taylor	New Zealand Warriors	Penrith Panthers
Bill Tupou	New Zealand Warriors	Canberra Raiders
Matt Bowen	North Queensland Cowboys	Super League: Wigan Warriors
Kalifa Faifai Loa	North Queensland Cowboys	Gold Coast Titans
Ashley Graham	North Queensland Cowboys	Retirement
Clint Greenshields	North Queensland Cowboys	Retirement
Dallas Johnson	North Queensland Cowboys	Retirement
Scott Moore	North Queensland Cowboys	Super League: London Broncos
Cheyse Blair	Parramatta Eels	Manly Warringah Sea Eagles
Daniel Harrison	Parramatta Eels	Manly Warringah Sea Eagles
Matt Keating	Parramatta Eels	Burleigh Bears (Intrust Super Cup)
Reni Maitua	Parramatta Eels	Canterbury-Bankstown Bulldogs
Ben Roberts	Parramatta Eels	Melbourne Storm
Matt Ryan	Parramatta Eels	Super League: Wakefield Trinity Wildcats
Cameron Ciraldo	Penrith Panthers	Retirement
Lachlan Coote	Penrith Panthers	North Queensland Cowboys
Mose Masoe	Penrith Panthers	Super League: St. Helens
Clint Newton	Penrith Panthers	Newcastle Knights
Nathan Smith	Penrith Panthers	Retirement
Brad Tighe	Penrith Panthers	Gold Coast Titans
Luke Walsh	Penrith Panthers	Super League: St. Helens
Roy Asotasi	South Sydney Rabbitohs	Super League: Warrington Wolves
Michael Crocker	South Sydney Rabbitohs	Retirement
Andrew Everingham	South Sydney Rabbitohs	Fukuoka Sanix Blues (Japanese rugby union)
Dylan Farrell	South Sydney Rabbitohs	St. George Illawarra Dragons
Matt King	South Sydney Rabbitohs	Retirement
Jeff Lima	South Sydney Rabbitohs	Super League: Catalans Dragons
Nathan Peats	South Sydney Rabbitohs	Parramatta Eels
Matt Cooper	St. George Illawarra Dragons	Retirement
Nathan Fien	St. George Illawarra Dragons	Retirement
Michael Henderson	St. George Illawarra Dragons	Retirement
Matt Prior	St. George Illawarra Dragons	Cronulla-Sutherland Sharks
Chase Stanley	St. George Illawarra Dragons	Canterbury-Bankstown Bulldogs
Daniel Vidot	St. George Illawarra Dragons	Brisbane Broncos
Michael Weyman	St. George Illawarra Dragons	Super League: Hull Kingston Rovers
Tinirau Arona	Sydney Roosters	Cronulla-Sutherland Sharks
Martin Kennedy	Sydney Roosters	Brisbane Broncos
Luke O'Donnell	Sydney Roosters	Retirement
Michael Oldfield	Sydney Roosters	Super League: Catalans Dragons
Nafe Seluini	Sydney Roosters	Burleigh Bears (Intrust Super Cup)
Blake Ayshford	Wests Tigers	Cronulla-Sutherland Sharks
Matthew Bell	Wests Tigers	Burleigh Bears (Intrust Super Cup)
Masada Iosefa	Wests Tigers	Retirement
Benji Marshall	Wests Tigers	St. George Illawarra Dragons
Tim Moltzen	Wests Tigers	Retirement
Ben Murdoch-Masila	Wests Tigers	Penrith Panthers
Eddy Pettybourne	Wests Tigers	Super League: Wigan Warriors
Joel Reddy	Wests Tigers	South Sydney Rabbitohs
Matt Utai	Wests Tigers	Retirement
Heath L'Estrange	Super League: Bradford Bulls	Sydney Roosters
Keith Lulia	Super League: Bradford Bulls	Wests Tigers
Rémi Casty	Super League: Catalans Dragons	Sydney Roosters
Daniel Holdsworth	Super League: Hull F.C.	Cronulla-Sutherland Sharks
Michael Dobson	Super League: Hull Kingston Rovers	Newcastle Knights
Cory Paterson	Super League: Hull Kingston Rovers	Wests Tigers
Jamie Soward	Super League: London Broncos	Penrith Panthers
Michael Witt	Super League: London Broncos	St. George Illawarra Dragons
Mike Cooper	Super League: Warrington Wolves	St. George Illawarra Dragons
Lee Mossop	Super League: Wigan Warriors	Parramatta Eels
Pat Richards	Super League: Wigan Warriors	Wests Tigers
Sam Tomkins	Super League: Wigan Warriors	New Zealand Warriors
Lote Tuqiri	Leinster (Irish rugby union)	South Sydney Rabbitohs

=== Coaches ===
Coach	2013 Club	2014 Club
Ricky Stuart	Parramatta Eels	Canberra Raiders
