= 2014 North Queensland Cowboys season =

Coordinates: 27°27′53″S 153°0′34″E

- NRL Rank: 5th
- Play-off result: Lost semi-final (v Sydney Roosters, 30-31)
- 2014 record: Wins: 14; draws: 0; losses: 10
- Points scored: For: 596; against: 406

Team information
- CEO: Peter Jourdain
- Coach: Paul Green
- Captain: Johnathan Thurston Matthew Scott
- Stadium: 1300SMILES Stadium
- Avg. attendance: 14,752
- High attendance: 25,120 (vs. Brisbane, Finals Week 1)

Top scorers
- Tries: Antonio Winterstein (15)
- Goals: Johnathan Thurston (93)
- Points: Johnathan Thurston (234)
← 2013	2015 →

The 2014 North Queensland Cowboys season was the 20th in the club's history. The team is based in Townsville, Queensland, Australia. Coached by Paul Green and co-captained by Johnathan Thurston and Matthew Scott, they competed in the NRL's 2014 Telstra Premiership.

== Season summary ==
On February 16, the Cowboys won the first trophy in their club's history when they won the inaugural NRL Auckland Nines tournament held at Eden Park in Auckland defeating the Brisbane Broncos, 16-7, in the final. They won the trophy and a prize money cheque of $370,000. Winger Kyle Feldt was awarded the Breakout Player of the Tournament award, while Gavin Cooper, Kane Linnett, James Tamou and Antonio Winterstein were named in the Team of the Tournament. The Cowboys finished the NRL season in 5th place, defeating the Brisbane Broncos in the first week of the finals. They were eliminated a week later by the Sydney Roosters.

=== Milestones ===
- Round 1: Paul Green recorded his first win as an NRL coach.
- Round 1: Kane Linnett played his 50th game for the club.
- Round 5: Matthew Wright made his debut for the club.
- Round 6: Brent Tate scored the club's 2000th NRL try.
- Round 7: Curtis Rona made his NRL debut.
- Round 7: Curtis Rona scored his first NRL try.
- Round 9: Cameron King made his debut for the club.
- Round 10: Johnathan Thurston played his 200th game for the club.
- Round 11: Ashton Sims captained the club for the first time.
- Round 12: John Asiata made his NRL debut.
- Round 17: Tautau Moga made his debut for the club.
- Round 17: Sam Hoare made his NRL debut.
- Round 17: Zac Santo made his NRL debut.
- Round 17: Ben Spina made his NRL debut.
- Round 17: Laurie and Ben Spina became the first father-son duo to play for the Cowboys.
- Round 17: Jason Taumalolo played his 50th game for the club.
- Round 17: Antonio Winterstein scored his 50th career try.
- Round 21: Gavin Cooper played his 100th game for the club.
- Round 22: Michael Morgan played his 50th game for the club.
- Round 22: The Cowboys recorded their biggest ever win (def. Wests Tigers 64-6).
- Round 22: The Cowboys recorded their highest ever score (64 points).
- Round 26: Johnathan Thurston became the NRL's top point scorer for the 2014 season with 208 points.
- Finals Week 2: Johnathan Thurston scored the most points in a season by a Cowboys' player with 234 points.

== Squad List ==
North Queensland Cowboys NRL Squad 2014
First team squad			Coaching staff
John Asiata – LK, SR; Scott Bolton – PR; Javid Bowen – CE, WG; Gavin Cooper – SR; Lachlan Coote – FB; Kyle Feldt – WG; Glenn Hall – SR, PR; Sam Hoare – PR; Patrick Kaufusi – PR; Cameron King – HK; Rory Kostjasyn – HK, LK	Kane Linnett – CE; Ethan Lowe – SR, LK; Robert Lui – HB, FE; Anthony Mitchell – HK; Tautau Moga – CE, WG; Michael Morgan – FB, HB; Hezron Murgha – FB; Joel Riethmuller – LK; Curtis Rona – CE, WG; Zac Santo – FB; Matthew Scott – PR	Ashton Sims – PR; Tariq Sims – SR, LK; Ben Spina – PR; James Tamou – PR; Brent Tate – CE; Jason Taumalolo – SR; Ray Thompson – HK, HB; Ricky Thorby – PR; Johnathan Thurston (c) – FE; Antonio Winterstein – WG, CE; Matthew Wright – FB, WG	Head coach: Paul Green; Assistant coaches: David Furner (assistant coach); Terry Matterson (assistant coach); Adrian Thomson (assistant coach); Paul Bowman (High Performance Manager); Steve Sartori (physiotherapist); Andrew Croll (Strength and Conditioning Coach); Mark Henry (Assistant Strength and Conditioning Coach); Josh Carius (performance analyst); Legend: (c) Captain(s); (vc) Vice-captain(s); Updated: 15 January 2014; Source(s): Cowboys Squad 2014

== Squad Movement ==
=== 2014 Gains ===
Player	Signed from	Until end of	Notes
John Asiata	Sydney Roosters	2015	
Lachlan Coote	Penrith Panthers	2016	
Cameron King	St George Illawarra Dragons	2015	
Tautau Moga	Sydney Roosters (mid-season)	2016	
Hezron Murgha	Northern Pride	2015	
Ben Spina	Northern Pride (mid-season)	2014	
Matthew Wright	Cronulla Sharks	2014	

=== 2014 Losses ===
Player	Signed To	Until end of	Notes
Matt Bowen	Wigan Warriors	2014	
Kalifa Faifai Loa	Gold Coast Titans	2015	
Ashley Graham	Retirement	-	
Clint Greenshields	Retirement	-	
Chris Grevsmuhl	South Sydney Rabbitohs	2015	
Jayden Hodges	Manly Sea Eagles	2016	
Dallas Johnson	Retirement	-	
Felise Kaufusi	Melbourne Storm	2014	
Blake Leary	Northern Pride	2014	
Tyson Martin	Mackay Cutters	2014	
Scott Moore	London Broncos	2014	
Wayne Ulugia	Hull Kingston Rovers	2015	

=== Re-signings ===
Player	Club	Until end of	Notes
Gavin Cooper	North Queensland Cowboys	2017	
Kyle Feldt	North Queensland Cowboys	2017	
Glenn Hall	North Queensland Cowboys	2015	
Sam Hoare	North Queensland Cowboys	2016	
Rory Kostjasyn	North Queensland Cowboys	2016	
Robert Lui	North Queensland Cowboys	2015	
Brent Tate	North Queensland Cowboys	2015	
Matthew Wright	North Queensland Cowboys	2016	

== Ladder ==
2014 NRL season
Pos	Team	Pld	W	D	L	B	PF	PA	PD	Pts
1	Sydney Roosters	24	16	0	8	2	615	385	+230	36
2	Manly Warringah Sea Eagles	24	16	0	8	2	502	399	+103	36
3	South Sydney Rabbitohs (P)	24	15	0	9	2	585	361	+224	34
4	Penrith Panthers	24	15	0	9	2	506	426	+80	34
5	North Queensland Cowboys	24	14	0	10	2	596	406	+190	32
6	Melbourne Storm	24	14	0	10	2	536	460	+76	32
7	Canterbury-Bankstown Bulldogs	24	13	0	11	2	446	439	+7	30
8	Brisbane Broncos	24	12	0	12	2	549	456	+93	28
9	New Zealand Warriors	24	12	0	12	2	571	491	+80	28
10	Parramatta Eels	24	12	0	12	2	477	580	−103	28
11	St. George Illawarra Dragons	24	11	0	13	2	469	528	−59	26
12	Newcastle Knights	24	10	0	14	2	463	571	−108	24
13	Wests Tigers	24	10	0	14	2	420	631	−211	24
14	Gold Coast Titans	24	9	0	15	2	372	538	−166	22
15	Canberra Raiders	24	8	0	16	2	466	623	−157	20
16	Cronulla-Sutherland Sharks	24	5	0	19	2	334	613	−279	14

== Fixtures ==
=== Pre-season ===
Date	Round	Opponent	Venue	Score	Tries	Goals	Attendance
Saturday, 8 February	Trial 1	Brisbane Broncos	Dolphin Oval	32 – 8	Sims (2), Kaufusi, King, Santo, Taumalolo	Feldt (3), Coote (1)	12,000
Saturday, 22 February	Trial 2	Gold Coast Titans	Clive Berghofer Stadium	28 – 12	Hall, Morgan, Sims, Taumalolo, Winterstein	Thurston (4)	8,532
Legend: Win Loss Draw

==== NRL Auckland Nines ====
The NRL Auckland Nines is a pre-season rugby league nines competition featuring all 16 NRL clubs. The 2014 competition was played over two days on February 15 and 16 at Eden Park in Auckland, New Zealand. The Cowbous featured in Pool navy and played Canberra, Manly and the Warriors. The top two teams of each pool qualified for the quarter-finals.

===== Pool Play =====
Pool navy
Team	Pld	W	D	L	PF	PA	PD	Pts
New Zealand Warriors	3	3	0	0	80	41	+39	6
North Qld Cowboys	3	1	0	2	55	45	+10	2
Canberra Raiders	3	1	0	2	32	53	-21	2
Manly Sea Eagles	3	1	0	2	25	53	-28	2

Date	Time (Local)	Round	Opponent	Venue	Score	Tries	Goals
Saturday, 15 February	2:50pm	Round 1	Manly Sea Eagles	Eden Park	8 – 17	Feldt, Rona	
Saturday, 15 Saturday	6:35pm	Round 2	Canberra Raiders	Eden Park	24 – 4	Bowen (bonus try), Cooper (bonus try), Linnett, Thompson	Feldt (3)
Sunday, 16 February	1:45pm	Round 3	New Zealand Warriors	Eden Park	23 – 28	Winterstein (2), Santo (bonus try), Feldt, Linnett	Feldt (1)
Legend: Win Loss

===== Finals =====
Quarter-Finals
Newcastle Knights	11
Brisbane Broncos	16
Parramatta Eels	6
Cronulla-Sutherland Sharks	17
New Zealand Warriors	17
South Sydney Rabbitohs	16
Penrith Panthers	12
North Queensland Cowboys	22

Semi-Finals
Brisbane Broncos	18
Cronulla-Sutherland Sharks	14
New Zealand Warriors	0
North Queensland Cowboys	8

Final
Brisbane Broncos	7
North Queensland Cowboys	16

Date	Time (Local)	Round	Opponent	Venue	Score	Tries	Goals
Sunday, 16 February	4:45pm	Quarter	Penrith Panthers	Eden Park	22 – 12	Feldt (2), Morgan, Rona, Sims	Feldt (1)
Sunday, 16 February	6:10pm	Semi	New Zealand Warriors	Eden Park	8 – 0	Bowen, Feldt	
Sunday, 16 February	7:30pm	Final	Brisbane Broncos	Eden Park	16 – 7	Rona (2), Winterstein	Lui (1), Morgan (1)
Legend: Win Loss

=== Regular season ===
Date	Round	Opponent	Venue	Score	Tries	Goals	Attendance
Saturday, 8 March	Round 1	Canberra Raiders	1300SMILES Stadium	28 – 22	Cooper, Feldt, Kostjasyn, Thurston, Winterstein	Thurston (4/5)	12,121
Friday, 14 March	Round 2	Brisbane Broncos	Suncorp Stadium	12 – 16	Cooper, Thurston	Thurston (2/3)	42,303
Sunday, 22 March	Round 3	New Zealand Warriors	1300SMILES Stadium	16 – 20	Feldt, Morgan, Winterstein	Thurston (2/3)	12,738
Monday, 31 March	Round 4	Gold Coast Titans	Cbus Super Stadium	12 – 13	Scott, Thurston	Thurston (2/2)	9,482
Monday, 7 April	Round 5	Newcastle Knights	1300SMILES Stadium	28 – 2	Morgan (2), Tate, Thompson, Wright	Thurston (4/5)	11,189
Saturday, 12 April	Round 6	Wests Tigers	Campbelltown Stadium	4 – 16	Tate	Thurston (0/1)	6,456
Friday, 18 April	Round 7	Manly Sea Eagles	Central Coast Stadium	21 – 26	Tate (2), Feldt, Rona	Thurston (2/3, FG), Feldt (0/2)	10,013
Saturday, 26 April	Round 8	Parramatta Eels	1300SMILES Stadium	42 – 14	Linnett (2), Rona (2), Morgan, Scott, Thurston	Thurston (7/7)	13,285
Friday, 9 May	Round 9	Brisbane Broncos	1300SMILES Stadium	27 – 14	Kostjasyn, Linnett, Lowe, Scott	Thurston (5/6, FG)	21,340
Saturday, 17 May	Round 10	Sydney Roosters	1300SMILES Stadium	42 – 10	Linnett (3), T. Sims, Tate, Thurston, Wright	Thurston (7/9)	15,361
Sunday, 25 May	Round 11	Canberra Raiders	GIO Stadium	42 – 12	Lowe, Rona	Lowe (2/2)	8,412
Saturday, 31 May	Round 12	Melbourne Storm	1300SMILES Stadium	22 – 0	Linnett, Morgan, Thurston, Winterstein	Thurston (3/4)	12,392
Friday, 6 June	Round 13	Parramatta Eels	Pirtek Stadium	16 – 18	Morgan, Tamou, Winterstein	Thurston (2/3)	10,142
	Round 14	Bye					
Monday, 23 June	Round 15	Newcastle Knights	Hunter Stadium	28 – 36	Lui (2), Rona, T. Sims, Winterstein	Thurston (4/5)	11,925
Saturday, 28 June	Round 16	South Sydney Rabbitohs	1300SMILES Stadium	20 – 18	Wright (2), T. Sims, Winterstein	Thurston (2/5)	15,897
Saturday, 5 July	Round 17	St George Illawarra Dragons	Kogarah Oval	24 – 27	Winterstein (2), Rona, T. Sims, Taumalolo	Lowe (2/4), Wright (0/1)	12,082
	Round 18	Bye					
Friday, 18 July	Round 19	Cronulla Sharks	Remondis Stadium	36 – 18	Thurston (2), Hall, Morgan, T. Sims, Winterstein	Thurston (6/7)	9,366
Saturday, 26 July	Round 20	Canterbury Bulldogs	ANZ Stadium	20 – 12	Wright (2), Winterstein	Thurston (4/5)	9,873
Saturday, 2 August	Round 21	Gold Coast Titans	1300SMILES Stadium	28 – 8	Cooper, Linnett, Moga, Morgan, Thurston	Thurston (4/6)	14,487
Saturday, 9 August	Round 22	Wests Tigers	1300SMILES Stadium	64 – 6	Wright (3), Moga (2), Taumalolo (2), Winterstein (2), Linnett, Morgan, T. Sims	Thurston (8/12)	12,317
Monday, 18 August	Round 23	Penrith Panthers	Sportingbet Stadium	23 – 22	Hall, Linnett, Lui, Winterstein	Thurston (3/4)	7,276
Saturday, 23 August	Round 24	South Sydney Rabbitohs	ANZ Stadium	22 –10	Feldt (2), Taumalolo, Winterstein	Thurston (3/5)	17,171
Monday, 1 September	Round 25	Cronulla Sharks	1300SMILES Stadium	20 – 19	Taumalolo (2), Thurston	Thurston (3/3, 2 FG)	11,712
Saturday, 6 September	Round 26	Manly Sea Eagles	1300SMILES Stadium	30 – 16	Feldt (2), Linnett, Lui, Winterstein	Thurston (5/6)	22,521
Legend: Win Loss Draw Bye

=== Finals ===
Date	Round	Opponent	Venue	Score	Tries	Goals	Attendance
Saturday, 13 September	Qual. Final	Brisbane Broncos	1300SMILES Stadium	32 – 20	Cooper (2), Linnett, Lui, Morgan	Thurston (6/6)	25,120
Saturday, 13 September	Semi-final	Sydney Roosters	Allianz Stadium	30 – 31	Cooper, Lowe, Lui, Scott, Thurston	Thurston (5/5)	18,355
Legend: Win Loss Draw Bye

== Statistics ==
Name	App	T	G	FG	Pts
John Asiata	6	-	-	-	-
Scott Bolton	26	-	-	-	-
Gavin Cooper	17	6	-	-	24
Kyle Feldt	10	7	-	-	28
Glenn Hall	24	2	-	-	8
Sam Hoare	6	-	-	-	-
Cameron King	2	-	-	-	-
Rory Kostjasyn	25	2	-	-	8
Kane Linnett	25	12	-	-	48
Ethan Lowe	10	3	4	-	20
Robert Lui	25	6	-	-	24
Anthony Mitchell	4	-	-	-	-
Tautau Moga	11	3	-	-	12
Michael Morgan	26	10	-	-	40
Joel Riethmuller	6	-	-	-	-
Curtis Rona	7	6	-	-	24
Zac Santo	1	-	-	-	-
Matthew Scott	20	4	-	-	16
Ashton Sims	25	-	-	-	-
Tariq Sims	21	6	-	-	24
Ben Spina	1	-	-	-	-
James Tamou	21	1	-	-	4
Brent Tate	12	5	-	-	20
Jason Taumalolo	25	6	-	-	24
Ray Thompson	22	1	-	-	4
Johnathan Thurston	24	11	93	4	234
Antonio Winterstein	23	15	-	-	60
Matthew Wright	17	9	-	-	32
Totals		115	97	4	658

== Representatives ==
The following players have played a representative match in 2014

	City vs Country	ANZAC Test	Four Nations Qualifier	State of Origin 1	State of Origin 2	State of Origin 3	Prime Minister's XIII	Four Nations
Michael Morgan	-	-	-	-	-	-	Prime Minister's XIII	-
Tautau Moga	-	-	-	-	-	-	-	Samoa
Matthew Scott	-	Australia	-	Queensland	Queensland	-	-	-
Ashton Sims	-	-	Fiji	-	-	-	-	-
Tariq Sims	Country	-	-	-	-	-	-	-
James Tamou	-	Australia	-	New South Wales	New South Wales	New South Wales	-	-
Brent Tate	-	-	-	Queensland	Queensland	-	-	-
Jason Taumalolo	-	-	-	-	-	-	-	New Zealand
Johnathan Thurston	-	Australia	-	Queensland	Queensland	Queensland	-	-
Antonio Winterstein	-	-	-	-	-	-	-	Samoa

== Honours ==
=== League ===
- Dally M Medal: Johnathan Thurston
- Dally M Five-Eighth of the Year: Johnathan Thurston

=== Club ===
- Paul Bowman Medal: Johnathan Thurston
- Player's Player: Johnathan Thurston
- Club Person of the Year: Ashton Sims
- Rookie of the Year: John Asiata
- Most Improved: Michael Morgan
- Member's Player of the Year: Michael Morgan
- NYC Player of the Year: Josh Chudleigh

== Feeder Clubs ==
=== National Youth Competition ===
- North Queensland Cowboys - 12th, missed finals

=== Queensland Cup ===
- Mackay Cutters - 9th, missed finals
- Northern Pride - 1st, won Grand Final
