= 2014 Brisbane Broncos season =

Coordinates: 27°27′53″S 153°0′34″E

- NRL rank: 8th
- Play-off result: Lost Elimination Final (North Queensland Cowboys, 20–32)
- NRL Auckland Nines: Lost Final (North Queensland Cowboys, 7–16)
- 2014 record: Wins: 16; losses: 14
- Points scored: For: 549; against: 456

Team information
- CEO: Paul White
- Coach: Anthony Griffin
- Captains: Corey Parker; Justin Hodges
- Stadium: Suncorp Stadium
- Avg. attendance: 33,355
- Agg. attendance: 400,244
- High attendance: 44,122 (South Sydney Rabbitohs, 25 April)
- Low attendance: 22,292 (Newcastle Knights, 23 August)

Top scorers
- Tries: Dale Copley (16)
- Goals: Corey Parker (57)
- Points: Corey Parker (114)
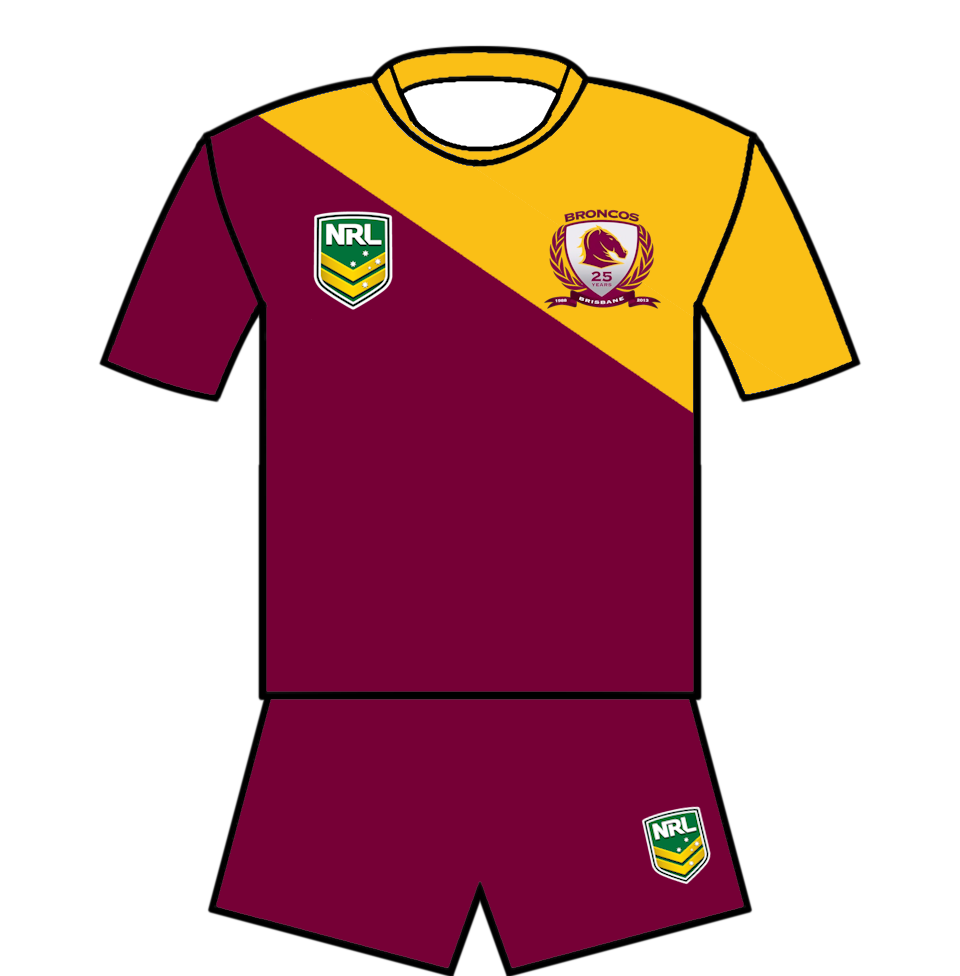
Home colours
← 2013	List of seasons	2015 →

The 2014 Brisbane Broncos season was the 27th in the club's history. The team is based in Brisbane, Queensland, Australia. Coached by Anthony Griffin and co-captained by Justin Hodges and Corey Parker, they competed in the NRL's 2014 Telstra Premiership, finishing the regular season eighth (out of sixteen) to make it into the finals. The Broncos were then knocked out of contention in the first game of the finals against the North Queensland Cowboys.

== Season summary ==
On 10 January, Sam Thaiday announced he was standing down from the Broncos captaincy. Thaiday had captained the Broncos since 2012, when he took over from retired Darren Lockyer. Justin Hodges and Corey Parker were subsequently named co-captains.

In March 2014, Anthony Griffin moved Kiwis fullback Josh Hoffman to five-eighth, with recruit Ben Barba to play fullback in Round 1 against his former team, the Bulldogs.

In July, the Broncos switched Hoffman back to fullback and moved Barba to five-eighth, abandoning the Hoffman at five-eighth experiment in Round 19 against the Warriors in a 28–22 win at Suncorp Stadium.

On 21 July, head coach Anthony Griffin was informed that his services would not be required beyond the 2014 season. Griffin agreed to see out the remainder of the season. When asked by the media about informing the players, Griffin said, "I told them I got the arse." At the time of his departure, he had coached 93 games for the Broncos, recording 51 wins.

Later that day, it was announced that Wayne Bennett had signed a three-year deal to return as head coach of the Broncos from 2015. Bennett was the club’s inaugural head coach, having previously led the team from 1988 to 2008.

== Squad information ==
As of 13 September 2014

Cap.	Nat.	Player	Position	First Broncos game	Previous First Grade RL club
100	(Australia)	Justin Hodges (c)	Centre	2000	(Australia) Sydney Roosters
106	(Australia)	Corey Parker (c)	Prop	2001	—N/a
127	(Australia)	David Stagg	Lock	2003	(Australia) Canterbury-Bankstown Bulldogs
128	(Australia)	Sam Thaiday	Lock	2003	—N/a
144	(Australia)	Ben Hannant	Prop	2006	(Australia) Canterbury-Bankstown Bulldogs
163	(Australia)	Andrew McCullough	Hooker	2008	—N/a
165	(New Zealand)	Josh Hoffman	Five-eighth	2008	—N/a
172	(New Zealand)	Alex Glenn	Second-row	2009	—N/a
174	(Australia)	Josh McGuire	Prop	2009	—N/a
177	(Australia)	Dale Copley	Centre	2009	—N/a
178	(Australia)	Ben Hunt	Halfback	2009	—N/a
180	(Tonga)	David Hala	Prop	2009	—N/a
182	(Australia)	Matt Gillett	Lock	2010	—N/a
183	(Australia)	Mitchell Dodds	Prop	2010	—N/a
190	(England)	Jack Reed	Centre	2011	—N/a
195	(Australia)	Lachlan Maranta	Wing	2012	—N/a
196	(Australia)	Jarrod Wallace	Prop	2012	—N/a
199	(New Zealand)	Jordan Kahu	Wing	2013	—N/a
200	(Australia)	Jake Granville	Hooker	2013	—N/a
201	(Australia)	Corey Oates	Second-row	2013	—N/a
203	(Australia)	Jordan Drew	Centre	2013	—N/a
204	(Australia)	Ben Barba	Fullback	2014	(Australia) Canterbury-Bankstown Bulldogs
205	(Samoa)	Daniel Vidot	Wing	2014	(Australia) St. George Illawarra Dragons
206	(Australia)	Martin Kennedy	Prop	2014	(Australia) Sydney Roosters
207	(Australia)	Todd Lowrie	Lock	2014	New Zealand Warriors
208	(Cook Islands)	Francis Molo	Prop	2014	—N/a
–	(Australia)	Ajuma Adams	Second-row	Yet to debut	—N/a
–	(Australia)	Marmin Barba	Fullback	Yet to debut	—N/a
–	(Australia)	Cameron Cullen	Hooker	Yet to debut	—N/a
–	(Australia)	Jon Green	Prop	Yet to debut	(Australia) Cronulla-Sutherland Sharks
–	(Australia)	Darren Nicholls	Halfback	Yet to debut	—N/a
–	(New Zealand)	Kodi Nikorima	Fullback	Yet to debut	—N/a
–	(Tonga)	Joe Ofahengaue	Prop	Yet to debut	—N/a
–	(Australia)	Duncan Paia'aua	Five-eighth	Yet to debut	—N/a
–	(Australia)	Zach Strasser	Five-eighth	Yet to debut	—N/a
–	(Australia)	Ashley Taylor	Halfback	Yet to debut	—N/a

== Squad changes ==
=== Transfers in ===
Date	Position	Player	From	Year/s	Ref.
15 August 2013	Five-eighth	Zach Strasser	Redcliffe Dolphins	2 Years	
28 August 2013	Fullback	Ben Barba	Canterbury-Bankstown Bulldogs	3 Years	
11 September 2013	Prop	Martin Kennedy	Sydney Roosters	3 Years	
15 October 2013	Lock	Todd Lowrie	New Zealand Warriors	2 Years	
15 October 2013	Wing	Stewart Mills	Cronulla-Sutherland Sharks	1 Year	
15 October 2013	Wing	Daniel Vidot	St. George Illawarra Dragons	2 Years	
28 October 2013	Wing	Marmin Barba	Gold Coast Titans	2 Years	
22 May 2014	Halfback	Darren Nicholls	Wyong Roos (Mid-season)	—	

=== Transfers out ===
Date	Position	Player	To	Year/s	Ref.
25 March 2013	Fullback	Corey Norman	Parramatta Eels	3 Years	
24 August 2013	Halfback	Peter Wallace	Penrith Panthers	3 Years	
26 August 2013	Five-eighth	Scott Prince	Retirement	–	
28 August 2013	Prop	Dunamis Lui	Manly Warringah Sea Eagles	–	
24 September 2013	Prop	Lama Tasi	Salford RLFC	2 Years	
17 November 2013	Hooker	Kurt Baptiste	Canberra Raiders	1 Year	
26 November 2013	Prop	Scott Anderson	Wakefield Trinity	1 Year	
30 January 2014	Prop	Nick Slyney	London Broncos	–	
30 January 2014	Wing	Denan Kemp	Thirroul Butchers	1 Year	
17 March 2014	Wing	Jharal Yow Yeh	Retirement (Mid-season)	–	
30 June 2014	Wing	Stewart Mills	Released (Mid-season)	–	

=== Re-signings ===
Date	Position	Player	Year/s	Ref.
3 February 2014	Second-row	David Stagg	2015	
22 April 2014	Centre	Justin Hodges	2 Years	
22 April 2014	Prop	Corey Parker	2 Years	
30 May 2014	Wing	Lachlan Maranta	2 Years	
30 May 2014	Prop	Jarrod Wallace	2 Years	
13 June 2014	Prop	David Hala	1 Year	
1 October 2014	Halfback	Ben Hunt	2 Years	
9 October 2014	Second-row	Corey Oates	2 Years	

=== Contract lengths ===
Player	2014	2015	2016	2017	2018	Source
Ben Barba	Brisbane Broncos	Cronulla-Sutherland Sharks				
Jake Granville	Brisbane Broncos	North Queensland Cowboys				
David Hala	Brisbane Broncos	Gold Coast Titans				
Ben Hannant	Brisbane Broncos	North Queensland Cowboys				
Josh Hoffman	Brisbane Broncos	Gold Coast Titans				
Martin Kennedy	Brisbane Broncos	Sydney Roosters				
Stewart Mills	Brisbane Broncos	Released				
Darren Nicholls	Brisbane Broncos					
Marmin Barba	Brisbane Broncos					
Alex Glenn	Brisbane Broncos					
Jordan Kahu	Brisbane Broncos					
Todd Lowrie	Brisbane Broncos					
Andrew McCullough	Brisbane Broncos					
Josh McGuire	Brisbane Broncos					
Corey Oates	Brisbane Broncos					
David Stagg	Brisbane Broncos					
Zach Strasser	Brisbane Broncos					
Sam Thaiday	Brisbane Broncos					
Daniel Vidot	Brisbane Broncos					
Dale Copley	Brisbane Broncos					
Matt Gillett	Brisbane Broncos					
Justin Hodges	Brisbane Broncos					
Lachlan Maranta	Brisbane Broncos					
Corey Parker	Brisbane Broncos					
Jarrod Wallace	Brisbane Broncos					
Ben Hunt	Brisbane Broncos					
Corey Oates	Brisbane Broncos					
Jack Reed	Brisbane Broncos					

== Coaching staff ==
Role	Name	Ref.
Head coach	Anthony Griffin	
Assistant Coach	Stephen Kearney	
Assistant Coach	Kristian Woolf	
Head of Performance	Alex Corvo	
Athletic Performance Coach	Steve Hooper	
Athletic Performance Coach	Adam Paulo	
List & Recruitment Manager	Peter Nolan	
Team & Welfare Manager	Scot Czislowski	
NYC Coach	Craig Hodges	
NYC Assistant Coach	Adam Brideson	

== Fixtures ==
=== Pre-season ===
Date	Round	Opponent	Venue	Score	Tries	Goals	Attendance
Saturday, 8 February	Trial 1	North Queensland Cowboys	Dolphin Oval	8 – 32	Daniel Vidot, Jayden Nikorima	Jordan Kahu (0/2)	12,000
Saturday, 23 February	Trial 2	New Zealand Warriors	Forsyth Barr Stadium	4 – 48	Jack Reed	Corey Parker (0/1)	6,000
Legend: Win Loss Draw

==== NRL Auckland Nines ====
The NRL Auckland Nines is a pre-season rugby league nines competition featuring all 16 NRL clubs. The 2014 competition was played over two days on 15 and 16 February at Eden Park in Auckland, New Zealand. The Broncos featured in Pool Green and played the Bulldogs, Eels and Roosters. The top two teams of each pool qualified for the quarter-finals.

===== Pool Play =====
Pool Green
Team	Pld	W	D	L	PF	PA	PD	Pts
Parramatta Eels	3	2	0	1	55	32	23	4
Brisbane Broncos	3	2	0	1	42	32	10	4
Sydney Roosters	3	1	0	2	29	41	−12	2
Canterbury-Bankstown Bulldogs	3	1	0	2	27	47	−21	2

Date	Time (Local)	Round	Opponent	Venue	Score	Tries	Goals
Saturday, 15 February	1:25pm	Round 1	Canterbury-Bankstown Bulldogs	Eden Park	20–4	Dale Copley, Andrew McCullough, Ben Hunt, Ben Barba	
Saturday, 15 Saturday	5:10pm	Round 2	Sydney Roosters	Eden Park	7–14	Corey Parker (Bonus Try)	Corey Parker (1)
Sunday, 16 February	1:15pm	Round 3	Parramatta Eels	Eden Park	15–14	Kodi Nikorima (Bonus Try), Josh Hoffman, Ben Hunt	Andrew McCullough (1)
Legend: Win Loss

===== Finals =====
quarter-finals
Newcastle Knights	11
Brisbane Broncos	16
Parramatta Eels	6
Cronulla-Sutherland Sharks	17
New Zealand Warriors	17
South Sydney Rabbitohs	16
Penrith Panthers	12
North Queensland Cowboys	22

semi-finals
Brisbane Broncos	18
Cronulla-Sutherland Sharks	14
New Zealand Warriors	0
North Queensland Cowboys	8

Final
Brisbane Broncos	7
North Queensland Cowboys	16

Date	Time (Local)	Round	Opponent	Venue	Score	Tries	Goals
Sunday, 16 February	3:30pm	Quarter	Newcastle Knights	Eden Park	16–11	Andrew McCullough, Kodi Nikorima Josh Hoffman, Dale Copley	
Sunday, 16 February	5:45pm	Semi	Cronulla-Sutherland Sharks	Eden Park	18–14	Andrew McCullough, Ben Barba, Ben Hunt, Josh Hoffman	Matt Gillett {2)
Sunday, 16 February	7:30pm	Final	North Queensland Cowboys	Eden Park	7–16	Ben Hunt (Bonus Try)	Ben Hunt (1)
Legend: Win Loss

=== Regular season ===
Date	Round	Opponent	Venue	Score	Tries	Goals	Attendance
Friday, 7 March	Round 1	Canterbury-Bankstown Bulldogs	ANZ Stadium	18 – 12	Copley, Vidot, Maranta	Parker (2/3), Hunt (1/1)	18,040
Friday, 14 March	Round 2	North Queensland Cowboys	Suncorp Stadium	16 – 12	Gillett, Vidot, McCullough	Parker (2/3)	42,303
Friday, 21 March	Round 3	Sydney Roosters	Suncorp Stadium	26 – 30	Hunt (2), Thaiday, Maranta, Reed	Parker (3/6)	33,381
Friday, 28 March	Round 4	St. George Illawarra Dragons	WIN Stadium	36 – 20	Gillett (2), Thaiday, Lowrie, Copley, Hunt	Parker (6/6)	10,526
Friday, 4 April	Round 5	Parramatta Eels	Suncorp Stadium	18 – 25	Copley, Hunt, McGuire	Parker (3/3)	32,009
Friday, 11 April	Round 6	Gold Coast Titans	Cbus Super Stadium	8 – 12	Hunt	Parker (2/2)	20,524
Friday, 18 April	Round 7	Newcastle Knights	Hunter Stadium	32 – 6	Glenn, Gillett, B. Barba, Copley, Hannant, Hoffman	Parker (3/6), Hunt (1/1)	22,254
Friday, 25 April	Round 8	South Sydney Rabbitohs	Suncorp Stadium	26 – 28	McCullough (2), Maranta, Gillett, Reed	Parker (1/3), Hunt (2/2)	44,122
Friday, 9 May	Round 9	North Queensland Cowboys	1300SMILES Stadium	14 – 27	Hunt (2), Copley	Parker (1/3)	21,340
Friday, 16 May	Round 10	Gold Coast Titans	Suncorp Stadium	22 - 8	Copley (2), Gillett, Reed	Parker (3/4)	31,380
Saturday, 24 May	Round 11	Wests Tigers	Campbelltown Stadium	16 – 14	Oates (2)	Hunt (4/4)	16,511
Sunday, 1 June	Round 12	Manly-Warringah Sea Eagles	Suncorp Stadium	36 – 10	Reed (2), Copley (2), Maranta, Glenn, Gillett	Parker (2/4), Hunt (2/3)	32,017
Monday, 9 June	Round 13	Canberra Raiders	GIO Stadium	28 – 4	Copley (2), McGuire, B. Barba, Glenn	Parker (1/2), Hunt (3/3)	8,904
	Round 14	Bye					
Saturday, 21 June	Round 15	New Zealand Warriors	Mt Smart Stadium	10 – 19	Granville, B. Barba	Hunt (1/2)	16,025
Friday, 27 June	Round 16	Cronulla-Sutherland Sharks	Suncorp Stadium	22 – 24	Hala (2), Vidot, Glenn	Hunt (3/4)	24,285
	Round 17	Bye					
Monday, 14 July	Round 18	Penrith Panthers	Sportingbet Stadium	34 – 35	Copley, Hodges, Granville, Reed, Vidot, Oates	Parker (5/6)	12,439
Saturday, 19 July	Round 19	New Zealand Warriors	Suncorp Stadium	28 – 22	Copley (2), Hannant, Hunt, Kahu	Parker (4/6)	37,082
Friday, 25 July	Round 20	Melbourne Storm	Suncorp Stadium	8 – 30	Copley, Glenn		36,319
Friday, 1 August	Round 21	Manly-Warringah Sea Eagles	Brookvale Oval	4 – 16	Reed		12,873
Friday, 8 August	Round 22	Canterbury-Bankstown Bulldogs	Suncorp Stadium	41 – 10	Hunt (2), Copley, Vidot, B. Barba, Oates, Thaiday	Parker (4/5), Hunt (2/4), McCullough (FG)	28,344
Thursday, 14 August	Round 23	South Sydney Rabbitohs	ANZ Stadium	16 – 42	Hodges, Thaiday, Reed	Parker (2/3)	14,094
Saturday, 23 August	Round 24	Newcastle Knights	Suncorp Stadium	48 – 6	B. Barba (3), Reed (2), Vidot, Gillett, Maranta, Oates	Parker (4/5), Hunt (2/4)	22,282
Friday, 29 August	Round 25	St. George Illawarra Dragons	Suncorp Stadium	30 – 22	Hunt (2), Gillett (2), Vidot	Parker (5/5)	36,720
Friday, 5 September	Round 26	Melbourne Storm	AAMI Park	12 – 22	Hunt, Reed	Parker (2/3)	20,032
Legend: Win Loss Draw Bye

=== Ladder ===
2014 NRL season
Pos	Team	Pld	W	D	L	B	PF	PA	PD	Pts
1	Sydney Roosters	24	16	0	8	2	615	385	+230	36
2	Manly Warringah Sea Eagles	24	16	0	8	2	502	399	+103	36
3	South Sydney Rabbitohs (P)	24	15	0	9	2	585	361	+224	34
4	Penrith Panthers	24	15	0	9	2	506	426	+80	34
5	North Queensland Cowboys	24	14	0	10	2	596	406	+190	32
6	Melbourne Storm	24	14	0	10	2	536	460	+76	32
7	Canterbury-Bankstown Bulldogs	24	13	0	11	2	446	439	+7	30
8	Brisbane Broncos	24	12	0	12	2	549	456	+93	28
9	New Zealand Warriors	24	12	0	12	2	571	491	+80	28
10	Parramatta Eels	24	12	0	12	2	477	580	−103	28
11	St. George Illawarra Dragons	24	11	0	13	2	469	528	−59	26
12	Newcastle Knights	24	10	0	14	2	463	571	−108	24
13	Wests Tigers	24	10	0	14	2	420	631	−211	24
14	Gold Coast Titans	24	9	0	15	2	372	538	−166	22
15	Canberra Raiders	24	8	0	16	2	466	623	−157	20
16	Cronulla-Sutherland Sharks	24	5	0	19	2	334	613	−279	14

=== Finals ===
Qualifying and elimination finals
13 Sept, Allianz Stadium
1	Sydney	18
4	Penrith	19
13 Sept, 1300SMILES Stadium
5	North Queensland	32
8	Brisbane	20
14 Sept, AAMI Park
6	Melbourne	4
7	Canterbury-Bankstown	28
12 Sept, Allianz Stadium
2	Manly-Warringah	24
3	South Sydney	40

Semi-finals
19 Sept, Allianz Stadium
Sydney	31
North Queensland	30
20 Sept, Allianz Stadium
Canterbury-Bankstown	18
Manly-Warringah	17

Preliminary finals
27 Sept, ANZ Stadium
Penrith	12
Canterbury-Bankstown	18
26 Sept, ANZ Stadium
Sydney	22
South Sydney	32

Grand final
5 Oct, ANZ Stadium
Canterbury-Bankstown	6
South Sydney	30

Date	Round	Opponent	Venue	Score	Tries	Goals	Attendance
Saturday, 13 September	Elimination Final	North Queensland Cowboys	1300SMILES Stadium	20 – 32	Kahu (2), B. Barba, Vidot	Parker (2/4)	25,120

=== Result by round ===
Round	1	2	3	4	5	6	7	8	9	10	11	12	13	14	15	16	17	18	19	20	21	22	23	24	25	26	27
Ground	A	H	H	A	H	A	A	H	A	H	A	H	A	–	A	H	–	A	H	H	A	H	A	H	H	A	A
Result	W	W	L	W	L	L	W	L	L	W	W	W	W	B	L	L	B	L	W	L	L	W	L	W	W	L	L
Position	5	2	6	2	3	8	5	6	11	11	8	6	6	5	6	7	6	7	6	8	10	10	10	9	8	8	8
Points	2	4	4	6	6	6	8	8	8	10	12	14	16	18	18	18	20	20	22	22	22	24	24	26	28	28	28

Source: National Rugby League
A = Away; H = Home; N = Neutral; B = Bye; W = Win; D = Draw; L = Loss

== Milestone games ==
As of Elimination Final

Round	Player	Milestone
Round 1	Ben Barba	Broncos Debut
Round 1	Martin Kennedy	Broncos Debut
Round 1	Todd Lowrie	Broncos Debut
Round 1	Daniel Vidot	Broncos Debut, 1st Broncos Try
Round 3	Ben Barba	100 NRL Games
Round 4	Todd Lowrie	1st Broncos Try
Round 5	Corey Parker	1000 NRL Points
Round 7	Ben Barba	1st Broncos Try
Round 11	Ben Hunt	100 NRL Games
Round 11	Francis Molo	NRL Debut
Round 12	Josh Hoffman	100 NRL Games
Round 12	Josh McGuire	100 NRL Games
Round 12	Dale Copley	50 NRL Games
Round 15	Jake Granville	1st Career Try
Round 18	Sam Thaiday	200 NRL Games
Round 20	Todd Lowrie	200 NRL Games
Round 21	Matt Gillett	100 NRL Games
Round 24	Daniel Vidot	100 NRL Games

== Statistics ==
Name	App	T	G	FG	Pts
Ben Barba	25	8	0	0	32
Dale Copley	25	16	0	0	64
Matt Gillett	21	10	0	0	40
Alex Glenn	25	5	0	0	20
Jake Granville	8	2	0	0	8
David Hala	7	2	0	0	8
Ben Hannant	21	2	0	0	8
Justin Hodges	17	2	0	0	8
Josh Hoffman	20	1	0	0	4
Ben Hunt	25	13	21	0	94
Jordan Kahu	3	3	0	0	12
Martin Kennedy	16	0	0	0	0
Todd Lowrie	18	1	0	0	4
Lachlan Maranta	17	5	0	0	20
Andrew McCullough	23	3	0	1	13
Josh McGuire	24	2	0	0	8
Francis Molo	1	0	0	0	0
Corey Oates	20	5	0	0	20
Corey Parker	22	0	57	0	114
Jack Reed	23	11	0	0	44
David Stagg	4	0	0	0	0
Sam Thaiday	19	4	0	0	16
Daniel Vidot	23	8	0	0	32
Jarrod Wallace	14	0	0	0	0
Totals		103	78	1	569

== Representatives ==
The following players have played a representative match in 2014

	City vs Country	ANZAC Test	Four Nations Qualifier	State of Origin 1	State of Origin 2	State of Origin 3	Four Nations
Matt Gillett	-	Kangaroos	-	Queensland	Queensland	Queensland	-
Justin Hodges	-	-	-	Queensland	Queensland	Queensland	-
Josh McGuire	-	-	-	-	-	-	Samoa
Corey Parker	-	Kangaroos	-	Queensland	-	Queensland	Kangaroos
Sam Thaiday	-	-	-	-	Queensland	Queensland	Kangaroos
Daniel Vidot	-	-	Samoa	-	-	-	Samoa
Ben Hunt	-	-		-	-	-	Kangaroos

== Awards ==
=== League ===
- NRL RLPA Academic Team of the Year: Todd Lowrie
- NRL Tradesman of the Year: Aaron Rockley (Inaugural winner)

=== Broncos Awards Night ===
Held at Brisbane Convention & Exhibition Centre on Friday 10 October 2014.

- Paul Morgan Medal: Ben Hunt
- Player's Player: Ben Hunt
- Fan Player of the Year: Ben Hunt
- Best Back: Ben Hunt
- Best Forward: Josh McGuire
- Most Consistent: Alex Glenn
- Play of The Year: Ben Barba
- Clubman of the Year: Scot Czislowski
- NYC Player of the Year: Joe Ofahengaue
- NYC Players’ Player: Jai Arrow
- NYC Best Back: Ashley Taylor
- NYC Best Forward: Aaron Rockley

== NRL Under-20s ==
In 2014, the Broncos Under-20s team was again coached by Craig Hodges and captained by Brett Greinke. The Broncos Under-20s finished the regular season in 2nd position, with 16 wins, 1 draw and 7 losses. The Broncos reached the Grand Final against the Junior Warriors, losing 32–34 in a close finish.

Francis Molo made his NRL debut throughout the 2014 NRL season.

=== Notable statistics ===
Statistic	Player	Total
Most Tries	Kodi Nikorima, Tom Opacic	19 Tries
Most Goals	Jayden Nikorima	52/64 @81.25%
Most Points	Jayden Nikorima	176 Points
Most Games	Joe Ofahengaue, Aaron Rockley	28 Games

=== Ladder ===
Pos	Team	Pld	W	D	L	B	PF	PA	PD	Pts	
1	Newcastle Knights (M)	24	17	2	5	2	828	554	+274	36	Advance to finals series
2	Brisbane Broncos	24	16	1	7	2	686	618	+68	33	Advance to finals series
3	Parramatta Eels	24	16	0	8	2	812	576	+236	32	Advance to finals series
4	St. George Illawarra Dragons	24	16	0	8	2	728	512	+216	32	Advance to finals series
5	Sydney Roosters	24	15	1	8	2	755	545	+210	31	Advance to finals series
6	Wests Tigers	24	15	1	8	2	682	570	+112	31	Advance to finals series
7	South Sydney Rabbitohs	24	13	0	11	2	574	598	−24	26	Advance to finals series
8	New Zealand Warriors (P)	24	12	1	11	2	733	544	+189	25	Advance to finals series
9	Penrith Panthers	24	12	1	11	2	617	552	+65	25	
10	Manly Warringah Sea Eagles	24	12	1	11	2	632	716	−84	25	
11	Melbourne Storm	24	12	0	12	2	532	590	−58	24	
12	North Queensland Cowboys	24	8	0	16	2	547	793	−246	16	
13	Canberra Raiders	24	8	0	16	2	595	890	−295	16	
14	Cronulla-Sutherland Sharks	24	6	2	16	2	525	726	−201	14	
15	Gold Coast Titans	24	6	0	18	2	584	757	−173	12	
16	Canterbury-Bankstown Bulldogs (W)	24	3	0	21	2	523	812	−289	6	

Updated to match(es) played on 7 September 2014. Source: 2014 NYC - Holden Cup - RLP, 2014 NRL Under-20s season
(M) Minor premiers; (P) Premiers; (W) Wooden spoon
