= 2014 Cronulla-Sutherland Sharks season =

- NRL rank: 16th
- 2014 record: Wins: 5; losses: 19
- Points scored: For: 334; against: 613

Team information
- CEO: Steve Noyce
- Coach: James Shephard (Acting)
- Assistant coach: John Morris (Acting)
- Captains: Paul Gallen; Wade Graham
- Stadium: Remondis Stadium
- Avg. attendance: 12,628

Top scorers
- Tries: Sosaia Feki (9)
- Goals: Michael Gordon (50)
- Points: Michael Gordon (124)
← 2013	2015 →

The 2014 Cronulla-Sutherland Sharks season is the 48th in the club's history.

== New Signings ==
- Blake Ayshford from Wests Tigers
- Matt Prior from St George Illawarra Dragons
- Daniel Holdsworth from Hull F.C.
- Eric Grothe from Out of Retirement
- Siosaia Vave from Melbourne Storm
- Tinirau Arona from Sydney Roosters
- Jacob Gagan from Manly Sea Eagles

== NRL Ladder ==
2014 NRL season
Pos	Team	Pld	W	D	L	B	PF	PA	PD	Pts
1	Sydney Roosters	24	16	0	8	2	615	385	+230	36
2	Manly Warringah Sea Eagles	24	16	0	8	2	502	399	+103	36
3	South Sydney Rabbitohs (P)	24	15	0	9	2	585	361	+224	34
4	Penrith Panthers	24	15	0	9	2	506	426	+80	34
5	North Queensland Cowboys	24	14	0	10	2	596	406	+190	32
6	Melbourne Storm	24	14	0	10	2	536	460	+76	32
7	Canterbury-Bankstown Bulldogs	24	13	0	11	2	446	439	+7	30
8	Brisbane Broncos	24	12	0	12	2	549	456	+93	28
9	New Zealand Warriors	24	12	0	12	2	571	491	+80	28
10	Parramatta Eels	24	12	0	12	2	477	580	−103	28
11	St. George Illawarra Dragons	24	11	0	13	2	469	528	−59	26
12	Newcastle Knights	24	10	0	14	2	463	571	−108	24
13	Wests Tigers	24	10	0	14	2	420	631	−211	24
14	Gold Coast Titans	24	9	0	15	2	372	538	−166	22
15	Canberra Raiders	24	8	0	16	2	466	623	−157	20
16	Cronulla-Sutherland Sharks	24	5	0	19	2	334	613	−279	14

== Results ==
- Round 1 - Cronulla Sharks vs Gold Coast Titans (12 - 18)

 Tries: Tinirau Arona, Wade Graham

- Round 2 - Canterbury Bulldogs vs Cronulla Sharks (42 - 4)

 Tries: Jonathan Wright

- Round 3 - Cronulla Sharks vs St George Illawarra Dragons (12 - 14)

 Tries: John Morris (2)

- Round 4 - Newcastle Knights vs Cronulla Sharks (30 - 0)

 Tries: No tries

- Round 5 - Cronulla Sharks vs New Zealand Warriors (37 - 6)

 Tries: Nathan Stapleton (4), Tinirau Arona, Sam Tagataese, Blake Ayshford

- Round 6 - Manly Sea Eagles vs Cronulla Sharks (24 - 4)

 Tries: Wade Graham

- Round 7 - Cronulla Sharks vs Sydney Roosters (18 - 24)

 Tries: Ricky Leutele, Wade Graham, Sosaia Feki

- Round 8 - Cronulla Sharks vs Penrith Panthers (24 - 20)

 Tries: Todd Carney, Ricky Leutele, Michael Gordon, Jeff Robson

- Round 9 - Parramatta Eels vs Cronulla Sharks (42 - 24)

 Tries: Sosaia Feki, Wade Graham, Isaac De Gois, Michael Gordon

- Round 10 - Cronulla Sharks vs Wests Tigers (20 - 22)

 Tries: Sam Tagataese, Paul Gallen, Michael Gordon

- Round 11 - Cronulla Sharks vs South Sydney Rabbitohs (0 - 18)

 Tries: No tries

- Round 13 - St George Illawarra Dragons vs Cronulla Sharks (0 - 30)

 Tries: No tries

- Round 15 - Cronulla Sharks vs Manly Sea Eagles (0 - 26)

 Tries: No tries

- Round 16 - Brisbane Broncos vs Cronulla Sharks (22 - 24)

 Tries: Jacob Gagan, Paul Gallen, Todd Carney, Sosaia Feki

- Round 17 - Sydney Roosters vs Cronulla Sharks (28 - 30)

 Tries: Jacob Gagan (2), Wade Graham, Sosaia Feki, Jeff Robson

- Round 18 - Cronulla Sharks vs Newcastle Knights (18 - 31)

 Tries: Jeff Robson, Michael Gordon, Sosaia Feki

- Round 19 - Cronulla Sharks vs North Queensland Cowboys (18 - 36)

 Tries: Jonathan Wright, Luke Lewis, Michael Gordon

- Round 20 - Penrith Panthers vs Cronulla Sharks (16 - 18)

 Tries: Jacob Gagan (2), Michael Gordon, Sam Tagataese

- Round 21 - Cronulla Sharks vs Parramatta Eels (12 - 32)

 Tries: Fa'amanu Brown, Jeff Robson

- Round 22 - New Zealand Warriors vs Cronulla Sharks (16 - 12)

 Tries: Tinirau Arona, Sosaia Feki

- Round 23 - Melbourne Storm vs Cronulla Sharks (48 - 6)

 Tries: Valentine Holmes

- Round 24 - Cronulla Sharks vs Canberra Raiders (12-22)

 Tries: Sosaia Feki, Tim Robinson

- Round 25 - North Queensland Cowboys vs Cronulla Sharks (20 - 19)

 Tries: Sosaia Feki (2), Pat Politoni
 Field Goal: Daniel Holdsworth

- Round 26 - Wests Tigers vs Cronulla Sharks (26-10)

 Tries: Valentine Holmes (2)
