= 2014 Parramatta Eels season =

Australia Rugby League Parramatta Eels 2014 season

- NRL Rank: 10th
- Play-off result: DNQ
- World Club Challenge: DNQ
- Auckland Nines: Quarter-finalists (Lost 6–17 vs Cronulla-Sutherland Sharks, 2nd Quarter Final)
- 2014 record: Wins: 12; draws: 0; losses: 12
- Points scored: For: 477; against: 580

Team information
- CEO: Scott Seward
- Coach: (Australia) Brad Arthur
- Captain: (Australia) Jarryd Hayne (Lebanon) Tim Mannah
- Stadium: Pirtek Stadium (Capacity: 20,741); ANZ Stadium (Capacity: 83,500); TIO Stadium (Capacity: 12,500)
- Avg. attendance: 18,788 (Home); 17,803 (Home & Away)
- Agg. attendance: 225,457 (Home); 427,267 (Home & Away)
- High attendance: 50,688 (21 April vs Wests Tigers, Round 7)

Top scorers
- Tries: (Australia) Jarryd Hayne (20)
- Goals: (Australia) Chris Sandow (53)
- Points: (Australia) Chris Sandow (111)
← 2013	List of seasons	2015 →

The 2014 Parramatta Eels Season was the 68th in the club's history. Coached by Brad Arthur and captained by Jarryd Hayne and Tim Mannah, they competed in the NRL's 2014 Telstra Premiership. The Parramatta club finished the regular season 10th out of 16 teams, failing to make the play-offs.

== Summary ==
Parramatta were determined to continue their rebuilding process in the off season after receiving the wooden spoon two years running. The club achieved this by releasing 12 players and signing more in key areas to help them reach success in the 2014 season. Some notable players are:

- William Hopoate
- Corey Norman
- Lee Mossop
- Nathan Peats

Parramatta also recruited a new coach in Brad Arthur, formerly an assistant coach at the club, as Ricky Stuart reneged on the final two years of his contract. This was in order to return to his hometown of Canberra and coach the Raiders, the team he played for during his youth.

Parramatta started strongly in the 2014 season, defeating the New Zealand Warriors 36–16 at Pirtek Stadium in their opening round, a mirror of twelve months previous where they also defeated the Warriors 40–10. After a 42-24 victory over Cronulla in round 9, Parramatta sat third on the table.

The Eels missed out on the finals for a fifth consecutive year. The club only needed to win one of their remaining two matches against either Newcastle or Canberra to reach the finals with both of these teams being out of contention for the finals themselves. Parramatta would lose 42-12 against Newcastle in round 25. The following week, a loss to the Canberra Raiders in round 26 of the season, ensured the club would miss out. The loss had added bitterness as Canberra were coached by former Parramatta coach Ricky Stuart.

== Standings ==
=== National Rugby League ===
2014 NRL season
Pos	Team	Pld	W	D	L	B	PF	PA	PD	Pts
1	Sydney Roosters	24	16	0	8	2	615	385	+230	36
2	Manly Warringah Sea Eagles	24	16	0	8	2	502	399	+103	36
3	South Sydney Rabbitohs (P)	24	15	0	9	2	585	361	+224	34
4	Penrith Panthers	24	15	0	9	2	506	426	+80	34
5	North Queensland Cowboys	24	14	0	10	2	596	406	+190	32
6	Melbourne Storm	24	14	0	10	2	536	460	+76	32
7	Canterbury-Bankstown Bulldogs	24	13	0	11	2	446	439	+7	30
8	Brisbane Broncos	24	12	0	12	2	549	456	+93	28
9	New Zealand Warriors	24	12	0	12	2	571	491	+80	28
10	Parramatta Eels	24	12	0	12	2	477	580	−103	28
11	St. George Illawarra Dragons	24	11	0	13	2	469	528	−59	26
12	Newcastle Knights	24	10	0	14	2	463	571	−108	24
13	Wests Tigers	24	10	0	14	2	420	631	−211	24
14	Gold Coast Titans	24	9	0	15	2	372	538	−166	22
15	Canberra Raiders	24	8	0	16	2	466	623	−157	20
16	Cronulla-Sutherland Sharks	24	5	0	19	2	334	613	−279	14

=== National Youth Competition ===
2014 NYC season
Pos	Team	Pld	W	D	L	B	PF	PA	PD	Pts
1	Newcastle Knights	24	17	2	5	2	828	554	+274	40
2	Brisbane Broncos	24	16	1	7	2	686	618	+68	37
3	Parramatta Eels	24	16	0	8	2	812	576	+236	36
4	St. George Illawarra Dragons	24	16	0	8	2	728	512	+216	36
5	Sydney Roosters	24	15	1	8	2	755	545	+210	35
6	Wests Tigers	24	15	1	18	2	682	570	+112	35
7	South Sydney Rabbitohs	24	13	0	11	2	574	598	-24	30
8	New Zealand Warriors (P)	24	12	1	11	2	733	544	+189	29
9	Penrith Panthers	24	12	1	11	2	617	552	+65	29
10	Manly-Warringah Sea Eagles	24	12	1	11	2	632	716	-84	29
11	Melbourne Storm	24	12	0	12	2	532	590	58	28
12	North Queensland Cowboys	24	8	0	16	2	547	793	-246	20
13	Canberra Raiders	24	8	0	16	2	595	890	-295	20
14	Cronulla-Sutherland Sharks	24	6	2	16	2	525	726	-201	18
15	Gold Coast Titans	24	6	0	18	2	584	757	-173	16
16	Canterbury-Bankstown Bulldogs	24	3	0	21	2	523	812	-289	10

== Fixtures ==
=== Pre-season ===
Match No.	Home	Score	Away	Match Information
Match No.	Home	Score	Away	Date and time (Local)	Venue	Attendance
1	Parramatta Eels	20 – 20	Wests Tigers	Saturday, 13 February, 7:40 PM	ANZAC Oval	3,284

=== Home and away season ===
Round	Home	Score	Away	Match Information
Round	Home	Score	Away	Date and time (Local)	Venue	Attendance
1	Parramatta Eels	36 – 16	New Zealand Warriors	9 March 2014, 3:00pm	Pirtek Stadium	14,397
2	Sydney Roosters	56 – 4	Parramatta Eels	15 March 2014, 7:30pm	Allianz Stadium	13,269
3	Manly-Warringah Sea Eagles	22 – 18	Parramatta Eels	23 March 2014, 3:00pm	Brookvale Oval	14,135
4	Parramatta Eels	32 – 16	Penrith Panthers	29 March 2014, 5:30pm	Pirtek Stadium	14,448
5	Brisbane Broncos	18 – 25	Parramatta Eels	4 April 2014, 7:40pm	Suncorp Stadium	32,009
6	Parramatta Eels	14 – 12	Sydney Roosters	12 April 2014, 5:30pm	Pirtek Stadium	15,312
7	Parramatta Eels	18 – 21	Wests Tigers	21 April 2014, 4:00pm	ANZ Stadium, Sydney	50,688
8	North Queensland Cowboys	42 – 14	Parramatta Eels	26 April 2014, 5:30pm	1300SMILES Stadium	13,285
9	Parramatta Eels	42 – 24	Cronulla-Sutherland Sharks	12 May 2014, 7:00pm	Pirtek Stadium	12,541
10	Parramatta Eels	36 – 0	St. George Illawarra Dragons	17 May 2014, 3:00pm	Pirtek Stadium	18,631
Bye Round
12	Penrith Panthers	38 – 12	Parramatta Eels	30 May 2014, 7:45pm	Sportingbet Stadium	19,141
13	Parramatta Eels	18 – 16	North Queensland Cowboys	6 June 2014, 7:40pm	Pirtek Stadium	10,142
14	Canterbury-Bankstown Bulldogs	12 – 22	Parramatta Eels	15 June 2014, 3:00pm	ANZ Stadium, Sydney	24,012
15	Melbourne Storm	46 – 20	Parramatta Eels	22 June 2014, 2:00pm	AAMI Park	12,635
16	Parramatta Eels	10 – 16	Newcastle Knights	29 June 2014, 3:00pm	Pirtek Stadium	15,566
Bye Round
18	New Zealand Warriors	48 – 0	Parramatta Eels	12 July 2014, 7:30pm	Mt Smart Stadium	14,087
19	Parramatta Eels	12 – 32	South Sydney Rabbitohs	18 July 2014, 7:40pm	Pirtek Stadium	16,125
20	Gold Coast Titans	18 – 24	Parramatta Eels	26 July 2014, 5:30pm	Cbus Super Stadium	14,175
21	Cronulla-Sutherland Sharks	12 – 32	Parramatta Eels	2 August 2014,3:00pm	Remondis Stadium	12,798
22	Parramatta Eels	18 – 10	Canberra Raiders	9 August 2014, 8:30pm	TIO Stadium	9,527
23	Parramatta Eels	16 – 18	Canterbury-Bankstown Bulldogs	15 August 2014, 7:45pm	ANZ Stadium, Sydney	30,394
24	Parramatta Eels	22 – 12	Manly-Warringah Sea Eagles	22 August 2014, 7:45 pm	Pirtek Stadium	17,706
25	Newcastle Knights	42 – 12	Parramatta Eels	30 August 2014, 3:00 pm	Hunter Stadium	18,558
26	Canberra Raiders	33 – 20	Parramatta Eels	6 September 2014, 5:30 pm	GIO Stadium Canberra	13,706

== Representative call ups ==
=== Domestic ===
Pos.	Player	Team	Call-up
CE	William Hopoate	NSW City	2014 City vs Country Origin
	Darcy Lussick	NSW City	2014 City vs Country Origin
CE	William Hopoate	NSW	2014 State of Origin Series
FB	Jarryd Hayne	NSW	2014 State of Origin Series

=== International ===
Pos.	Player	Team	Call-up
WG	Semi Radradra	Fiji	2014 Pacific Test
WG	Vai Toutai	Tonga	v (Papua New Guinea) PNG, 16 October 2014
CE	John Folau	Tonga	v (Papua New Guinea) PNG, 16 October 2014
	Mark Daoud	Lebanon	Hayne–Mannah Cup
CE	Fabian Goodall	Fiji	Hayne–Mannah Cup
