= Tinirau Arona =

Cook Islands international rugby league footballer

Tinirau "T" Arona
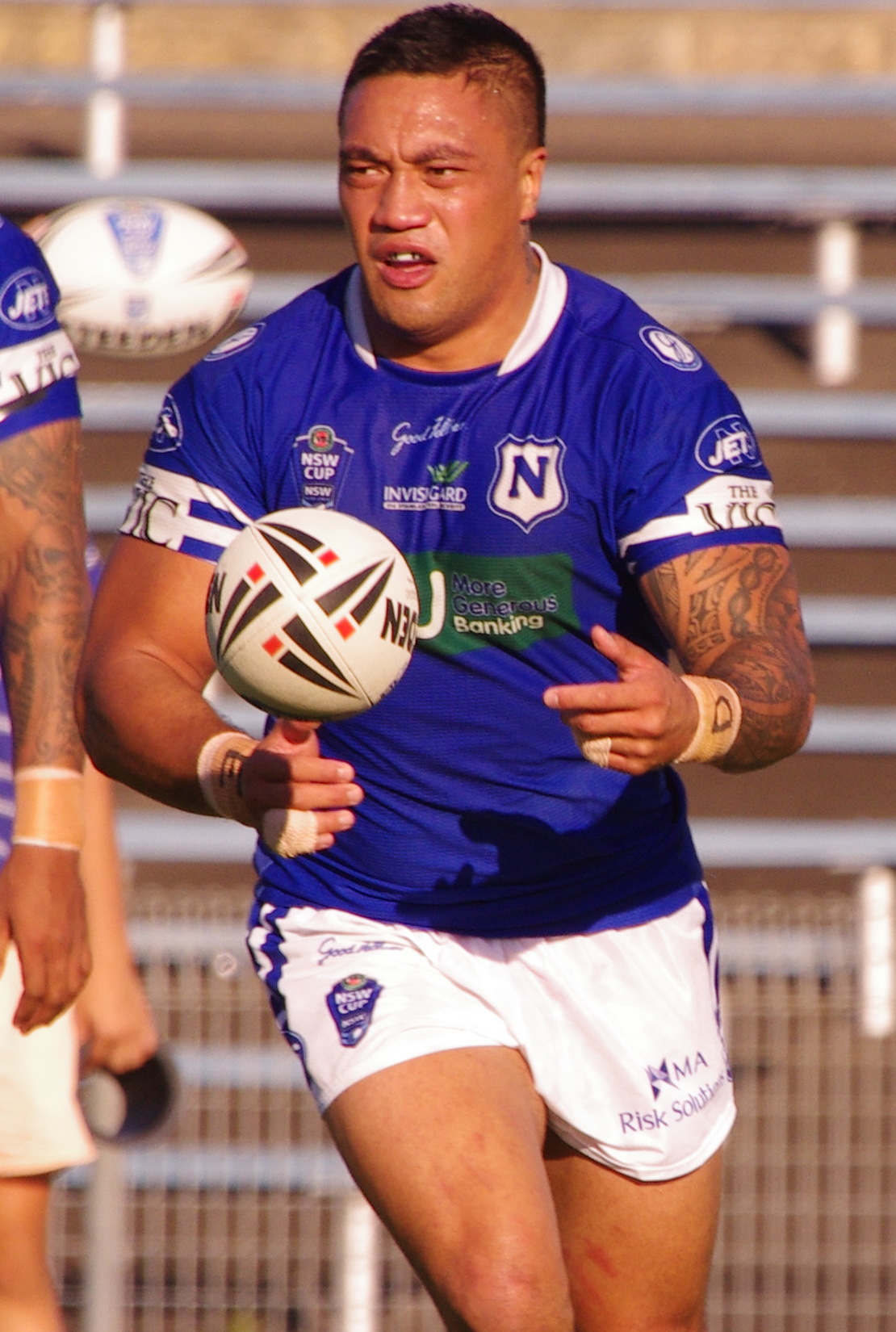

Personal information
- Full name: Tinirau Arona
- Born: 8 May 1989 (age 37) Dunedin, Otago, New Zealand

Playing information
- Height: 5 ft 11 in (1.80 m)
- Weight: 16 st 10 lb (106 kg)
- Position: Loose forward, Prop
Club
Years	Team	Pld	T	G	FG	P
2011–13	Sydney Roosters	36	3	0	0	12
2014–15	Cronulla Sharks	33	3	0	0	12
2016–22	Wakefield Trinity	153	11	0	0	44
	Total	222	17	0	0	68
Representative
Years	Team	Pld	T	G	FG	P
2006–	Cook Islands	11	3	1	0	14

Tinirau Arona (born 8 May 1989) is a former Cook Islands international rugby league footballer who last played as a loose forward and prop for Wakefield Trinity in the Super League.

He previously played for the Sydney Roosters and the Cronulla-Sutherland Sharks in the NRL.

== Background ==
Arona was born in Dunedin, New Zealand. He is of Cook Islands descent and moved to Sydney, New South Wales, Australia as an 11-year-old. Arona is cousins with Penrith Panthers and Cook Islands representative player Tupou Sopoaga.

He played his junior rugby league for the St Clair Comets, before being signed by the Penrith Panthers.

== Playing career ==
On 4 October 2006, Arona made his international début for the Cook Islands as a 17-year-old, playing off the interchange bench and scored the Cook Islands only try in the 46–6 loss to the Samoa. In October 2009, Arona played 2 matches for the Cook Islands in the Pacific Cup. Arona played in the Penrith Panthers NYC team in 2008–2009 before moving on to play for the Sydney Roosters NSW Cup team the Newtown Jets in 2010 where Arona was awarded the club's best and fairest and best forward. Earning himself a contract with the Sydney Roosters.

== Sydney Roosters ==
=== 2011 ===
In Round 4 of the 2011 NRL season, Arona made his NRL début for the Sydney Roosters, playing off the interchange bench in the Roosters 24–6 victory over the Wests Tigers at SFS. Arona finished his début year in the NRL with him playing in 13 matches for the Sydney Roosters in the 2011 NRL season. On 3 November 2011 The annual RLIF Awards dinner was held at the Tower of London and Arona was named Cook Islands' player of the year.

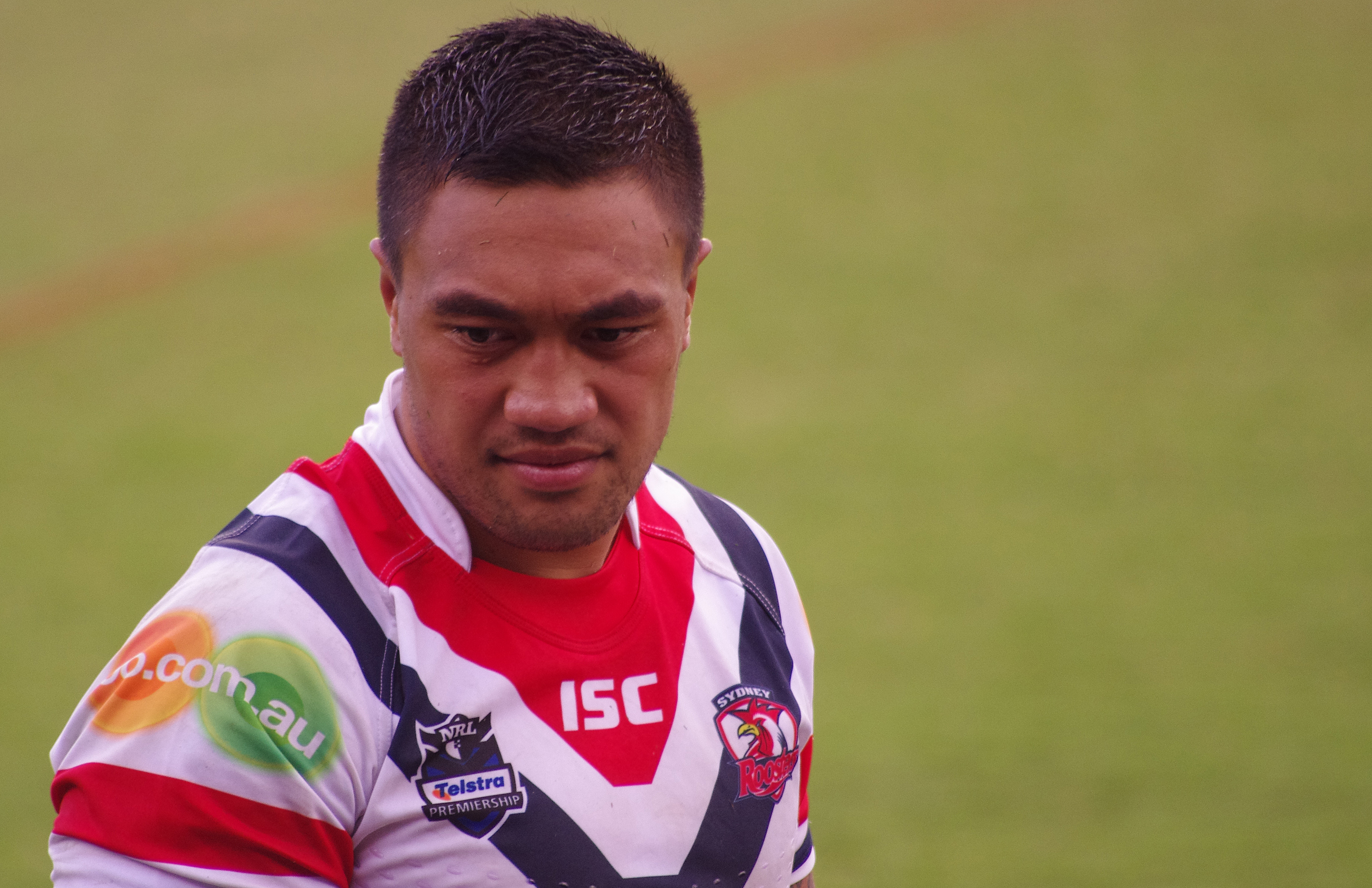
Arona playing for the Roosters in 2012

=== 2012 ===
In Round 9 against the Newcastle Knights at SFS, Arona scored his first NRL career try in the Roosters 24–6 win. Arona finished the 2012 NRL season with him playing in 20 matches and scoring 3 tries (12p) for the Sydney Roosters.

=== 2013 ===
In July 2013, Arona represented the NSW Residents side. Arona finished the 2013 NRL season with him playing in 3 matches for the Sydney Roosters. Arona was part of the Cook Islands national rugby league team that participated in the 2013 Rugby League World Cup playing at lock in all 3 matches for the Cook Islands. On 6 December 2013, Arona signed with the Cronulla-Sutherland Sharks after getting released from his contract with the Sydney Roosters.

== Cronulla-Sutherland Sharks ==
=== 2014 ===
In round 1 of the 2014 NRL season, Arona made his National Rugby League Premiership début for the Cronulla-Sutherland Sharks, scoring a try in Cronulla's 18–12 loss to the Gold Coast Titans at Remondis Stadium. Arona finished his first year with the Cronulla-Sutherland Sharks in the 2014 NRL season with him playing in 21 matches and scoring 3 tries (12p). The club endured one of their toughest ever seasons in 2014 finishing with the wooden spoon.

== Wakefield Trinity ==
On 5 November 2015, Arona signed a one-year contract with Super League side Wakefield Trinity starting in 2016. In 2018, he signed a contract extension to remain at Wakefield until the end of the 2019 Super League season. In 2019, he signed a three-year contract extension to remain at Wakefield until the end of the 2022 season. On 24 August 2022, Arona announced he would depart Wakefield Trinity at the end of the season.

== International career ==
In Arona's final professional game, he scored a try and kicked the last conversion of the match in the Cook Islands 92–10 loss against Tonga at the Riverside Stadium. It was Cook Islands' worst ever international result, as of 2023. The Cook Islands finished their 2021 Rugby League World Cup campaign in third place in Group D, and were eliminated.

He retired from league at the end of the world cup in November 2022.

== Statistics ==
Year	Team	Games	Tries	Pts
2011	Sydney Roosters	13		
2012	Sydney Roosters	20	3	12
2013	Sydney Roosters	3		
2014	Cronulla-Sutherland Sharks	21	3	12
2015	Cronulla-Sutherland Sharks	12		
2016	Wakefield Trinity	32	2	8
2017	Wakefield Trinity	29	1	4
2018	Wakefield Trinity	30	3	12
2019	Wakefield Trinity	14	1	4
2020	Wakefield Trinity	12	2	8
2021	Wakefield Trinity	21	2	8
2022	Wakefield Trinity	25		
	Totals	222	17	68
