= NRL Nines =

Rugby league nines competition

- Sport: Rugby league
- Instituted: 2014
- Inaugural season: 2014
- Ceased: 2021 (Unofficially)
- Number of teams: 16 Male; 4 Female
- Country: Australia
- Current Champions: North Queensland Cowboys (NRL); St. George Illawarra Dragons (NRLW) (2020)
- Most titles: New Zealand Kiwi Ferns (2 titles); North Queensland Cowboys (2 titles)
- Broadcast partner: Fox Sports (AU); Sky Sports (NZ)
- Related competition: Rugby League World Cup 9s

The NRL Nines is a rugby league nines competition, normally held during the NRL preseason each year. It was initially held in Auckland, New Zealand, between 2014 and 2017 before going on hiatus.

Returning in 2020, hosting duties moved to Perth, Western Australia, before being cancelled in 2021. The series has not returned since.

== Competition format ==
=== Auckland (2014–2017) ===
Two national women's teams compete in one section of the tournament and sixteen NRL club men's teams compete in the other. Each of the men's squad must include at least 12 of their top 25 players in their squad, and at least one marquee player. The winner of the men's tournament received AUD$500,000 with a total prize pool of AUD$2,250,000. In the first four editions, the competition has had eight different finalists and four different winners, though the 2016 title was later stripped from the Parramatta Eels for breaching the salary cap.

Since 2015 the Kiwiferns and the Jillaroos also competed in a three-game series, with the Kiwiferns winning the series 2-1. These games are played during the final stages of the men's tournament and allow the male players more of a break between their games while providing a broader tournament. Also in 2015, the pools were given traditional Maori names that were chosen by a public vote and were: Rangitoto, Waiheke, Piha and Hunua Ranges.

=== Perth (2020) ===
The women's teams were NRL Women's Premiership sides instead of national teams.

=== Series Cancellations (2021–2024) ===
The 2021 series was cancelled entirely, not due to the COVID-19 pandemic in Australia, but due to an overly-crowded preseason schedule.

When the 2022 Fixtures list was released by the NRL, it included no mention of the World Club Challenge or NRL Nines competitions.

The World Club Challenge did make its return in 2023, and again in 2024, but the NRL Nines competition was absent for both years.

== Rules ==
There are a number of rule variations that are implemented to ensure the games are faster and to ensure fewer delays and stoppages.

The major rule changes that differ from regular NRL games are:

- Two nine-minute halves with a two-minute half time period.
- Nine players a side with five unlimited interchange players (six interchanges in 2014).
- Scrums are only formed after a double knock on, with attacking teams electing which side to feed the ball.
- No video referee, with one on-field referee, two touch judges and two in-goal judges.
- Five minute golden try period in qualifying rounds with the match deemed a draw if there is no score, while unlimited golden try for the finals.
- A tap restart takes place after a 40/20.
- Five points for a try scored in the bonus zone under the posts, with two point drop kick conversion attempts.
- The scoring team will have a drop-kick kick-off at the half way mark to restart play.
- Three minute sin bins (Five in 2014).
- Five tackles in a set.

== Finals ==
Note – The Parramatta Eels were stripped of their 2016 Auckland Nines title due to a breach of the NRL salary cap. The 2016 title was withheld by the NRL rather than awarding it to the runners up.

=== Men's ===
Year	Winners	Score	Runners-up	Referee	Venue	Date
NRL Auckland Nines
2014	North Queensland Cowboys	16 – 7	Brisbane Broncos	B. Cummins	Eden Park Auckland	16 February 2014
2015	South Sydney Rabbitohs	18 – 14	Cronulla-Sutherland Sharks	M. Cecchin	Eden Park Auckland	1 February 2015
2016	Parramatta Eels	22 – 4	New Zealand Warriors	G. Sutton	Eden Park Auckland	7 February 2016
2017	Sydney Roosters	10 – 8	Penrith Panthers	G. Atkins	Eden Park Auckland	5 February 2017
NRL Nines
2020	North Queensland Cowboys	23 – 14	St George Illawarra Dragons	G. Atkins	Perth Oval Perth	15 February 2020
2021	Competition not held due to packed pre-season schedule.					
2022	Competition Not Held					
2023	Competition Not Held					
2024	Competition Not Held					

==== Team performance ====
Team	Premiers	Runners-up	Years won	Years runner-up
North Queensland Cowboys	2	0	2014, 2020	–
South Sydney Rabbitohs	1	0	2015	–
Sydney Roosters	1	0	2017	–
Brisbane Broncos	0	1	–	2014
Cronulla-Sutherland Sharks	0	1	–	2015
New Zealand Warriors	0	1	–	2016
Penrith Panthers	0	1	–	2017
St George Illawarra Dragons	0	1	–	2020
Parramatta Eels	0	0	~~2016~~	–

=== Women's ===
Year	Winners	Score	Runners-up	Referee	Venue	Date
NRL Nines
2020	St George Illawarra Dragons	28 – 4	Brisbane Broncos	A. Gee	Perth Oval Perth	15 February 2020
2021	Competition not held due to packed pre-season schedule.					
2022	Competition Not Held					
2023	Competition Not Held					
2024	Competition Not Held					

==== Team performance ====
Team	Winners	Runners-up	Years won	Years runner-up
St George Illawarra Dragons	1	0	2020	–
Brisbane Broncos	0	1	–	2020

== Women's Series ==
From 2015 to 2017, the New Zealand Kiwi Ferns and the Australia Jillaroos played a three match series, as the NRL Women's Premiership had not yet been formed. The NRL Women's competition was formed in 2018, and in 2020 the structure of the Women's competition changed to a club competition similar to the Men's.

Women's series results
Year	Winner	Wins	Losses	Drawn	Venue
2015	New Zealand Kiwi Ferns	2	1	0	Eden Park Auckland
2016	New Zealand Kiwi Ferns	2	1	0	Eden Park Auckland
2017	Australia Jillaroos	3	0	0	Eden Park Auckland

== Sponsorship ==
Since 2001, the National Rugby League premiership has been sponsored by Downer Group and known as the 'NRL Telstra Premiership'. Subsequently, the competition was simply known as the 'Dick Smith NRL Nines', being sponsored by the Australasian electronics retail chain until 2016.

== See also ==
- Rugby League World Sevens
- Super League World Nines
- Rugby League World Cup 9s
