= 2014 St. George Illawarra Dragons season =

- 2014 record: Wins: 11; draws: 0; losses: 13

Team information
- Coach: (Australia) Steve Price
- Captain: (Australia) Ben Creagh
- Stadium: WIN Jubilee Oval WIN Stadium
← 2013	2015 →

The 2014 St. George Illawarra Dragons season is the 16th in the joint venture club's history. Coached by Steve Price until his mid-season replacement by Paul McGregor, and captained by Ben Creagh, they're competing in the NRL's 2014 Telstra Premiership season. The Dragons had a strong start to the premiership's regular season, being the last team to remain undefeated. Part-way through the season Benji Marshall, after his brief stint in New Zealand rugby union, returned to the NRL with the Dragons, partnering Gareth Widdop in the halves.

== Transfers ==
New Signings

- Mike Cooper from Warrington Wolves
- Dylan Farrell from South Sydney Rabbitohs
- Gareth Widdop from Melbourne Storm
- Joel Thompson from Canberra Raiders
- Sam Williams from Canberra Raiders
- Matt Groat from Wests Tigers
- Josh Ailaomai from Sydney Roosters
- Peter Mata'utia from Newcastle Knights

Transfers / Leaving

- Jamie Soward to Penrith Panthers
- Matt Cooper Retired
- Nathan Fien Retired
- Michael Weyman to Hull Kingston Rovers
- Matt Prior to Parramatta Eels
- Bronx Goodwin Released
- Chase Stanley to Canterbury-Bankstown Bulldogs
- Cameron King to North Queensland Cowboys
- Daniel Vidot to Brisbane Broncos
- Kane Brennan to Canterbury-Bankstown Bulldogs
- Jackson Hastings to Sydney Roosters

Re-signed

- Leeson Ah Mau til 2015
- Ben Creagh til 2016
- Josh Dugan til 2017
- Craig Garvey til 2015
- Wil Matthews til 2014
- Adam Quinlan til 2015
- Mitch Rein til 2016
