= 2014 Canterbury-Bankstown Bulldogs season =

Canterbury-Bankstown Bulldogs
- 2014 season
- CEO: Raelene Castle
- Head coach: Des Hasler
- Captain: Michael Ennis; Frank Pritchard
- NRL: Runners Up
- Top try scorer: Club: Tim Lafai (14)
- Top points scorer: Club: Trent Hodkinson (158)
- Highest home attendance: 24,012
- Lowest home attendance: 9,873
- Average home attendance: 15,387

The 2014 Canterbury-Bankstown Bulldogs season was the 80th in the club's history. Coached by Des Hasler and co-captained by Michael Ennis and Frank Pritchard, they competed in the National Rugby League's 2014 Telstra Premiership. Finishing the regular season 7th (out of 16), the team reached the finals for the third consecutive year.

In the 2014 NRL Grand final, the Bulldogs were defeated by the South Sydney Rabbitohs.

== Pre-season ==
In the pre-season theBulldogs competed in the 2014 NRL Auckland Nines, the first ever staging of the nine-a-side knockout tournament.

== Regular season ==
The Bulldogs started the regular season with a narrow loss to the Brisbane Broncos before accounting for the Cronulla-Sutherland Sharks in the second week of the competition. They would then go on to get beaten by the Penrith Panthers after the siren in round 3. Following this loss the Bulldogs went on a season high 7 game winning streak, during which they made history by becoming the only team to ever win 3 consecutive games by a single point, victories they earned over the Sydney Roosters, the New Zealand Warriors and the South Sydney Rabbitohs.

Due to the impressive form of the team, several players were called up to play State Of Origin for New South Wales, which triggered a mid-season slump, during which the Bulldogs did not register a win for over a month. The team managed to regain some form towards the end of the origin period, claiming victories over the Canberra Raiders in round 16 and heavy favourites Manly-Warringah Sea Eagles in round 17. The Bulldogs played arguably their best defensive game of the year in round 18, when they kept the Melbourne Storm to just 4 points and ran out winners by 2.

What followed was an unpredictable collapse over the following four matches. Injuries and suspensions played havoc during the end of the regular season and after having such good defence all year, the bulldogs let in 123 points in just four games against the Wests Tigers, the North Queensland Cowboys, the Penrith Panthers and the Brisbane Broncos, only managing 56 in return. The Bulldogs next win came in round 23 when they accounted for the Parramatta Eels by 2 points. In round 24 the Bulldogs were able to reverse the result against the Tigers, winning 30-10 and all but assuring themselves a place in the finals.

The final 2 rounds of the regular season came as losses to the South Sydney Rabbitohs, who ran away victors after trailing the Bulldogs for most of the match, and the Gold Coast Titans, who came back from an 18-0 half time deficit to win 19-18 in golden point extra time.

The Bulldogs finished the regular season in Seventh place.

Round	Home	Score	Away	Match information
Round	Home	Score	Away	Date and time	Venue	Crowd
1	Canterbury Bankstown Bulldogs	12-18	Brisbane Broncos	Fri 7 Mar 2014, 8:05 pm AEDT	ANZ Stadium	18,040
2	Canterbury Bankstown Bulldogs	42-4	Cronulla Sharks	Mon 17 Mar 2014, 7:00 pm AEDT	ANZ Stadium	12,057
3	Penrith Panthers	18-16	Canterbury Bankstown Bulldogs	Sat 22 Mar 2014, 4:30 pm AEDT	Centerbet Stadium	13,291
4	Canterbury Bankstown Bulldogs	40-12	Melbourne Storm	Sat 29 Mar 2014, 4:30 pm AEDT	NIB Stadium	12,014
5	Sydney Roosters	8-9	Canterbury Bankstown Bulldogs	Fri 4 Apr 2014, 7:40 pm AEDT	Sydney Football Stadium	12,854
6	New Zealand Warriors	20-21	Canterbury Bankstown Bulldogs	Sun 13 Apr 2014, 4:00 pm NZST	Eden Park	22,165
7	South Sydney Rabbitohs	14-15	Canterbury Bankstown Bulldogs	Fri 18 Apr 2014, 4:00 pm AEST	ANZ Stadium	43,255
8	Canterbury Bankstown Bulldogs	16-12	Newcastle Knights	Sat 26 Apr 2014, 7:30 pm AEST	ANZ Stadium	15,286
9	St. George Illawarra Dragons	6-38	Canterbury Bankstown Bulldogs	Sun 11 May 2014, 3:00 pm AEST	ANZ Stadium	21,077
10	Canterbury Bankstown Bulldogs	16-12	New Zealand Warriors	Sun 18 May 2014, 2:00 pm NZST	Waikato Stadium	17,673
11	Canterbury Bankstown Bulldogs	12-32	Sydney Roosters	Fri 23 May 2014, 7:45 pm AEST	ANZ Stadium	19,088
12		BYE
13	Manly-Warringah Sea Eagles	32-10	Canterbury Bankstown Bulldogs	Fri 6 Jun 2014, 7:40 pm AEST	Brookvale Oval	9,235
14	Canterbury Bankstown Bulldogs	12-22	Parramatta Eels	Sun 15 Jun 2014, 3:00 pm AEST	ANZ Stadium	24,012
15	Canberra Raiders	14-22	Canterbury Bankstown Bulldogs	Fri 20 Jun 2014, 7:45 pm AEST	GIO Stadium	10,873
16		BYE
17	Canterbury Bankstown Bulldogs	23-16	Manly Warringah Sea Eagles	Fri 4 Jul 2014, 7:45 pm AEST	ANZ Stadium	14,921
18	Melbourne Storm	4-6	Canterbury Bankstown Bulldogs	Sat 12 Jul 2014, 7:30 pm AEST	AAMI Stadium	13,149
19	Wests Tigers	46-18	Canterbury Bankstown Bulldogs	Sun 20 Jul 2014, 3:00 pm AEST	ANZ Stadium	22,225
20	Canterbury Bankstown Bulldogs	12-20	North Queensland Cowboys	Sat 26 Jul 2014, 7:30 pm AEST	ANZ Stadium	9,873
21	Canterbury Bankstown Bulldogs	16-22	Penrith Panthers	Fri 1 Aug 2014, 7:45 pm AEST	ANZ Stadium	11,382
22	Brisbane Broncos	41-10	Canterbury Bankstown Bulldogs	Fri 8 Aug 2014, 7:45 pm AEST	Suncorp Stadium	28,334
23	Parramatta Eels	16-18	Canterbury Bankstown Bulldogs	Fri 15 Aug 2014, 7:45 pm AEST	ANZ Stadium	30,394
24	Canterbury Bankstown Bulldogs	30-10	Wests Tigers	Thu 21 Aug 2014, 7:45 pm	ANZ Stadium	9,877
25	Canterbury Bankstown Bulldogs	14-21	South Sydney Rabbitohs	Thu 28 Aug 2014, 7:45 pm AEST	ANZ Stadium	20,424
26	Gold Coast Titans	19-18	Canterbury-Bankstown Bulldogs	Sun 7 Sep 2014,3:00pm AEST	Robina Stadium	12,563

== Finals ==
In week one of the finals the Bulldogs travelled to Melbourne to face the Melbourne Storm in an elimination final. For the second time in one year the Bulldogs were able to account for the Storm in their own backyard. The Bulldogs started with a bang and ran up a 24-0 half time lead, the Storm managed to stop the flow of points in the second half, but were ultimately eliminated, losing 28-4.

The following week they faced the Manly-Warringah Sea Eagles in a semi-final that went into golden point extra time. In a fiery affair that saw one player from each team spend 10 minutes in the sin bin at different times of the game, the Bulldogs raced out to an early 16-0 lead before conceding a try on halftime, leaving the half time score at 16-6. In the second half, Manly managed to draw level at 16-16 and looked to have the momentum to win the game. With less than 10 minutes remaining in normal time, Trent Hodkinson kicked a field goal to give the Bulldogs a 17-16 lead. However Manly hit back with a field goal of their own and the scores were locked at 17-17 after 80 minutes. Each team had one shot at field goal in the opening minutes of extra time with no success, until 4 minutes in Hodkinson nailed his second field goal of the night to win the match 18-17, eliminating Manly and securing a Preliminary Final against the Penrith Panthers.

In week three of the finals the Bulldogs and the Panthers met in a Grand Final qualifier to see who would face the South Sydney Rabbitohs the following week. The Bulldogs entered the game as favourites and scored twice in the opening half an hour to set up an early 12-0 lead. The Panthers hit back on half time and the teams headed into the break at 12-6. Moments before half time Michael Ennis the Bulldogs on field captain suffered what was later found out to be a double fracture in his foot and he did not return in the second half. With the captain and hooker off the field the Bulldog's attack was hampered in the second half, but their desperation in defence remained. Defying the odds the Bulldogs, without the direction of their captain, were next to score in the 57th minute to extend their lead to 18-6. The Panthers fought bravely and were able to score in the 72nd minute, reducing the deficit to one converted try. The game went down to the wire with the Bulldogs penalised as the full-time siren sounded, handing Penrith one final opportunity to level the scores. The play did not work however and in eerily similar circumstances to 2004 the Bulldogs defeated the Panthers without the services of their captain in the second half to secure a grand final birth.

The Bulldogs faced the South Sydney Rabbitohs in the 2014 NRL Grand Final on 5 October and were defeated 30-6.

Round	Home	Score	Away	Match information
Round	Home	Score	Away	Date and time	Venue	Crowd
ELIM FINAL	Melbourne Storm	4-28	Canterbury-Bankstown Bulldogs	Sun 14 Sep 2014, 4:10 pm AEST	AAMI Stadium	19,230
SEMI FINAL	Manly Warringah Sea Eagles	17-18	Canterbury-Bankstown Bulldogs	Sat 20 Sep 2014, 7:45 pm AEST	Sydney Football Stadium	28,186
PRELIM FINAL	Penrith Panthers	12-18	Canterbury-Bankstown Bulldogs	Sat 27 Sep 2014, 7:55 pm AEST	ANZ Stadium	46,168
GRAND FINAL	South Sydney Rabbitohs	30-6	Canterbury Bankstown Bulldogs	Sun 5 Oct 2014, 7:20 pm AEDT	ANZ Stadium	83,833

== See also ==
List of Canterbury-Bankstown Bulldogs seasons
