= 2015 NRL Auckland Nines =

Rugby tournament

Tournament information
- Location: Eden Park, Auckland
- Dates: 31 January–1 February
- Teams: 16 Male; 2 Female

Final positions
- Champions: South Sydney Rabbitohs (1st title)
- Runner-up: Cronulla Sharks

Tournament statistics
- Matches played: 31 Male; 3 Female
- MVP: Adam Reynolds
- Top scorer: Adam Reynolds (34)
- Top try scorer(s): Jack Bird (4); Jake Mamo (4); Solomone Kata (4)

The 2015 NRL Auckland Nines (known as the Dick Smith NRL Auckland Nines due to sponsorship) was the second NRL Auckland Nines tournament, contested between all sixteen teams of the National Rugby League. The draw was released on 16 September 2014. It was a two-day, nine-a-side, knockout tournament held at Eden Park in Auckland, New Zealand. All sixteen NRL clubs and 288 players competed over the one weekend (31 January – 1 February) with AUD$2.4 million prize money split between the teams. In 2015, the pool names were chosen by a public vote. The pool names were: Rangitoto, Waiheke, Piha and Hunua Ranges. The event included two international women's teams, the Kiwi Ferns and the Jillaroos, who competed in a three-game series with the Kiwi Ferns winning 2-1.

== Tournament games ==
=== Rangitoto pool ===
Pos	Team	Pld	W	D	L	PF	PA	PD	Pts
1	Parramatta Eels	3	2	0	1	53	44	+9	4
2	Newcastle Knights	3	2	0	1	53	45	+8	4
3	St George Illawarra Dragons	3	2	0	1	44	49	−5	4
4	Manly-Warringah Sea Eagles	3	0	0	3	55	67	−12	0

31 January 2015	Parramatta Eels	22 – 17	Manly Warringah Sea Eagles	Auckland, New Zealand
12:30 NZDT	Bonus point tries: Tries: Conversions:		Tries: Conversions:	Stadium: Eden Park; Referee: Ben Cummins

31 January 2015	Newcastle Knights	18 – 7	St. George Illawarra Dragons	Auckland, New Zealand
12:55 NZDT	Bonus point tries: Tries: Conversions:		Tries: Conversions:	Stadium: Eden Park; Referee: Grant Atkins

31 January 2015	Parramatta Eels	21 – 15	Newcastle Knights	Auckland, New Zealand
16:25 NZDT	Bonus point tries: Radradra 1' (c); Tries: Sandow 5', Corey 10', Moeroa18'; Conversions: Kelly (1/2), Sandow (1/1), Radradra (0/1)		Bonus point tries: Houston 13' (c); Tries: Ross 3', Joseph Tapine 14'; Conversions: Roberts (1/3)	Stadium: Eden Park; Referee: Chris Sutton

31 January 2015	St. George Illawarra Dragons	25 – 21	Manly Warringah Sea Eagles	Auckland, New Zealand
16:50 NZDT	Bonus point tries: Dugan 4' (c); Tries: Thompson 6', Kiti Glymin 7', Nabuli 11', 18'; Conversions: Dugan (1/2), Marshall (1/2), Crook (0/1)		Bonus point tries: Lui 16'; Tries: Hiku 9', Trbojevic 12' (c), Jayden Hodges 14'; Conversions: Daly Cherry-Evans (2/3), Gutherson (0/1)	Stadium: Eden Park; Referee: Matt Noyen

1 February 2015	Parramatta Eels	10 - 12	St. George Illawarra Dragons	Auckland, New Zealand
11:10 NZDT	Bonus point tries: Tries: Conversions:		Tries: Conversions:	Stadium: Eden Park

1 February 2015	Manly Warringah Sea Eagles	17 - 20	Newcastle Knights	Auckland, New Zealand
11:35 NZDT	Bonus point tries: Tries: Conversions:		Tries: Conversions:	Stadium: Eden Park

=== Waiheke pool ===
Pos	Team	Pld	W	D	L	PF	PA	PD	Pts
1	South Sydney Rabbitohs	3	3	0	0	54	20	+34	6
2	North Queensland Cowboys	3	2	0	1	43	35	+8	4
3	Melbourne Storm	3	1	0	2	32	45	−13	2
4	Penrith Panthers	3	0	0	3	16	45	−29	0

31 January 2015	Melbourne Storm	8 – 17	North Queensland Cowboys	Auckland, New Zealand
13:20 NZDT	Bonus point tries: Tries: Conversions:		Tries: Conversions:	Stadium: Eden Park; Referee: Dave Munro

31 January 2015	South Sydney	11 – 4	Penrith Panthers	Auckland, New Zealand
13:45 NZDT	Bonus point tries: Clark 5' (c); Tries: McQueen 8'; Conversions: Reynolds (1/1), Luke (0/1)		Tries: Sopoaga 2'; Conversions: Isaac John (0/1)	Stadium: Eden Park; Referee: Peter Gough

31 January 2015	Melbourne Storm	20 – 4	Penrith Panthers	Auckland, New Zealand
17:15 NZDT	Tries: Tonumaipea 1', 13' (c), Koroibete 3', Chambers 4' (c); Conversions: Mann (2/3), Munster (0/1)		Tries: Jay 7'; Conversions: Koroisau (0/1)	Stadium: Eden Park; Referee: Matt Cecchin

31 January 2015	South Sydney Rabbitohs	19 – 12	North Queensland Cowboys	Auckland, New Zealand
17:40 NZDT	Tries: Grevsmuhl 3' (c), G. Burgess 12' (c), Matt King 16' (c); Conversions: Reynolds (3/3)		Tries: Cooper 5', O'Neill 6', 7'; Conversions: Wright (0/3)	Stadium: Eden Park; Referee: Alan Shortall

1 February 2015	Melbourne Storm	4 - 24	South Sydney Rabbitohs	Auckland, New Zealand
12:00 NZDT	Bonus point tries: Tries: Conversions:		Tries: Conversions:	Stadium: Eden Park

1 February 2015	North Queensland Cowboys	14 - 8	Penrith Panthers	Auckland, New Zealand
12:25 NZDT	Bonus point tries: Tries: Conversions:		Tries: Conversions:	Stadium: Eden Park

=== Hunua Ranges pool ===
Pos	Team	Pld	W	D	L	PF	PA	PD	Pts
1	Wests Tigers	3	2	0	1	50	32	+18	4
2	New Zealand Warriors	3	2	0	1	58	41	+17	4
3	Gold Coast Titans	3	1	0	2	48	56	−8	2
4	Canberra Raiders	3	1	0	2	46	73	−27	2

31 January 2015	Wests Tigers	16 – 10	Canberra Raiders	Auckland, New Zealand
14:20 NZDT	Bonus point tries: Tries: Buchanan 8' (c), Lovett 11', 16' (c); Conversions: Richards (2/3)		Tries: Croker 4' (c), Ahearn 5'; Conversions: Ahearn (1/1)	Stadium: Eden Park; Referee: Adam Devcich

31 January 2015	New Zealand Warriors	17 – 10	Gold Coast Titans	Auckland, New Zealand
14:45 NZDT	Bonus point tries: Kata 9' (c); Tries: Hoffman 5' (c), Lolohea 16'; Conversions: Johnson (2/3)		Tries: Hoffman 6' (c), Sezer 11'; Conversions: Mortimer (1/1), Sezer (0/1)	Stadium: Eden Park; Referee: Gavin Reynolds

31 January 2015	Wests Tigers	26 – 0	Gold Coast Titans	Auckland, New Zealand
18:15 NZDT	Bonus point tries: Josh Drinkwater 3' (c), Cherrington 7' (c); Tries: Simona 13', Funaki 16', Fine 18'; Conversions: Richards (2/2), Drinkwater (0/2), Simona (0/1)			Stadium: Eden Park; Referee: Jon Stone

31 January 2015	Canberra Raiders	23 – 19	New Zealand Warriors	Auckland, New Zealand
18:40 NZDT	Bonus point tries: Ahearn 18' (c); Tries: Edwards 6', Pangai 16' (c), Lee 18' (c); Conversions: Buttriss (1/1), Williams (1/1), Ahearn (1/1), J. Croker (0/1)		Bonus point tries: Johnson 7' (c); Tries: Maumalo 8', Lolohea 9', Allwood 12'; Conversions: Johnson (1/3), Townsend (0/1)	Stadium: Eden Park; Referee: Jared Maxwell

1 February 2015	Wests Tigers	8 - 22	New Zealand Warriors	Auckland, New Zealand
12:50 NZDT	Bonus point tries: Tries: Conversions:		Tries: Kata (2), Vatuvei, Lolohea, Henry; Conversions: Johnson (1)	Stadium: Eden Park

1 February 2015	Canberra Raiders	13 - 38	Gold Coast Titans	Auckland, New Zealand
13:15 NZDT	Bonus point tries: Tries: Conversions:		Tries:Josh Hoffman 2, James Roberts 2, Kane Elgey, Christan Hazard; Conversions:	Stadium: Eden Park

=== Piha pool ===
Pos	Team	Pld	W	D	L	PF	PA	PD	Pts
1	Cronulla-Sutherland Sharks	3	3	0	0	68	22	+46	6
2	Sydney Roosters	3	2	0	1	30	30	0	4
3	Brisbane Broncos	3	1	0	2	21	37	−16	2
4	Canterbury-Bankstown Bulldogs	3	0	0	3	10	40	−30	0

31 January 2015	Sydney Roosters	6 – 4	Brisbane Broncos	Auckland, New Zealand
15:10 NZDT	Tries: Tuivasa-Sheck 18'; Conversions: Tuivasa-Sheck (1/1)		Tries: Nicholls 8' (c); Conversions: Milford (0/1)	Stadium: Eden Park; Referee: Alan Shortall

31 January 2015	Cronulla-Sutherland Sharks	17 – 4	Canterbury-Bankstown Bulldogs	Auckland, New Zealand
15:35 NZDT	Bonus point tries: Politoni 18' (c); Tries: Brown 4', Gardner 6' (c); Conversions: Gardner (1/1), Holmes (1/2)		Tries: Rona 11'; Conversions: Mbye (0/1)	Stadium: Eden Park; Referee: Chris Butler

31 January 2015	Sydney Roosters	10 – 6	Canterbury-Bankstown Bulldogs	Auckland, New Zealand
19:05 NZDT	Tries: Langi 9', Elliot 14'; Conversions: Maloney (1/2)		Tries: Lane 13' (c); Conversions:	Stadium: Eden Park; Referee: Gavin Reynolds

31 January 2015	Cronulla-Sutherland Sharks	31 – 4	Brisbane Broncos	Auckland, New Zealand
19:30 NZDT	Bonus point tries: Ayshford 4' (c); Tries: Ayshford 1' (c), Sauiluma 6', 12' (c), Bird 9', 15'; Conversions: Holmes (3/6)		Tries: Whitchurch 17'; Conversions: Milford (0/1)	Stadium: Eden Park; Referee: Gavin Badger

1 February 2015	Sydney Roosters	14 – 20	Cronulla-Sutherland Sharks	Auckland, New Zealand
13:40 NZDT	Bonus point tries: Tries: Conversions:		Tries: Conversions:	Stadium: Eden Park

1 February 2015	Brisbane Broncos	13 – 0	Canterbury-Bankstown Bulldogs	Auckland, New Zealand
14:05 NZDT	Bonus point tries: Tries: Conversions:		Tries: Conversions:	Stadium: Eden Park

=== Finals ===
Quarter-Finals
Parramatta Eels	17
North Queensland Cowboys	11
South Sydney Rabbitohs	30
Newcastle Knights	6
Wests Tigers	4
Sydney Roosters	22
Cronulla Sharks	14
New Zealand Warriors	12

Semi-Finals
Parramatta Eels	6
South Sydney Rabbitohs	37
Sydney Roosters	4
Cronulla Sharks	10

Final
South Sydney Rabbitohs	18
Cronulla Sharks	14

1 February Game 25	Parramatta Eels	17-11	North Queensland Cowboys	Auckland
2:30 PM				Stadium: Eden Park; Referee: Rochelle Tamarua

1 February Game 26	South Sydney Rabbitohs	30-6	Newcastle Knights	Auckland
2:55 PM				Stadium: Eden Park

1 February Game 27	Wests Tigers	4-22	Sydney Roosters	Auckland
3:45 PM				Stadium: Eden Park

1 February Game 28	Cronulla Sharks	14-12	New Zealand Warriors	Auckland
4:10 PM			Tries: Vatuvei, Kata, Laumape	Stadium: Eden Park

1 February Game 29	Parramatta Eels	6-37	South Sydney Rabbitohs	Auckland
5:25 PM				Stadium: Eden Park

1 February Game 30	Sydney Roosters	4-10	Cronulla Sharks	Auckland
5:50 PM				Stadium: Eden Park

1 February Game 31	South Sydney Rabbitohs	18 – 14 (ET)	Cronulla Sharks	Auckland
7:30 PM				Stadium: Eden Park

=== Kiwi Ferns v. Jillaroos ===
31 January 2015	Kiwi Ferns	8 – 4	Jillaroos	Auckland, New Zealand
16:00 NZDT	Tries: Vaughan 13', Woodman 17'; Conversions: Mariu (0/2)	[Report Report]	Tries: Hoepper 6'; Conversions: Hoepper (0/1)	Stadium: Eden Park; Referee: Belinda Sleeman

1 February 2015	Kiwi Ferns	16 – 4	Jillaroos	Auckland, New Zealand
16:35 NZDT	Bonus point tries: Vaughan. Maaka; Tries: Fiso; Conversions: Mariu	[Report Report]	Tries: Hodges; Conversions:	Stadium: Eden Park

1 February 2015	Kiwi Ferns	7 – 8	Jillaroos	Auckland, New Zealand
18:40 NZDT	Bonus point tries: Vaughan; Conversions: Mariu	[Replay; Report Report]	Tries: Hancock, Breayley; Conversions: Hoepper (0/2)	Stadium: Eden Park

== Players ==
=== Team of the Tournament ===
Player	Club
Corey Norman	Parramatta Eels
Adam Reynolds	South Sydney Rabbitohs
Issac Luke	South Sydney Rabbitohs
George Burgess	South Sydney Rabbitohs
Michael Morgan	North Queensland Cowboys
Solomone Kata	New Zealand Warriors
Chris Heighington	Cronulla-Sutherland Sharks
Wade Graham	Cronulla-Sutherland Sharks
Blake Ayshford	Cronulla-Sutherland Sharks

=== Brisbane Broncos ===
Player
Andrew McCullough (C)
Ajuma Adams
Elijah Alick
Joe Boyce
Greg Eden
James Gavet
Alex Glenn
Todd Lowrie
Lachlan Maranta
Anthony Milford
Francis Molo
Darren Nicholls
Jayden Nikorima
Kodi Nikorima
Joe Ofahengaue
Tom Opacic
Matt Parcell
Aaron Whitchurch

=== Canberra Raiders ===
Player
Jarrod Croker (C)
Sam Williams
Mitch Cornish
Lachlan Croker
Sisa Waqa
Joel Edwards
Josh McCrone
Rhys Kennedy
Glen Buttriss
Brenko Lee
Bill Tupou
Jack Ahearn
Luke Bateman
Haydon Hodge
Mark Nicholls
Kyle O'Donnell
Tevita Pangai
Ken Nagas

=== Canterbury-Bankstown Bulldogs ===
Player
Tim Browne
Damien Cook
Levi Dodd
Adam Elliott
Herman Ese'ese
Antonio Kaufusi
Shaun Lane
Michael Lichaa
Moses Mbye
Josh Morris
Sam Perrett
Lloyd Perrett
Tyrone Phillips
Frank Pritchard
Curtis Rona
Corey Thompson
Aiden Tolman
Tony Williams

=== Cronulla-Sutherland Sharks ===
Player
Wade Graham (C)
Valentine Holmes
Sosaia Feki
Gerard Beale
Ricky Leutele
Jack Bird
Fa'amanu Brown
Kyle Stanley
Sam Tagataese
Pat Politoni
Tinirau Arona
Matt Prior
Chris Heighington
Blake Ayshford
Nathan Gardner
Todd Murphy
Sami Sauiluma
Junior Roqica

=== Gold Coast Titans ===
Player
William Zillman (C)
James Roberts
Anthony Don
David Mead
Josh Hoffman
Brad Tighe
Kalifa Faifai Loa
Aidan Sezer
Daniel Mortimer
Christian Hazard
Kierran Moseley
Ryan James
Mark Ioane
Luke Douglas
Lachlan Burr
Davin Crampton
Dave Taylor
Matt Robinson

=== Manly-Warringah Sea Eagles ===
Player
Daly Cherry-Evans (C)
Manaia Rudolph
Jayden Hodges
Brayden Wiliame
Tony Satini
Kieran Foran
Clinton Gutherson
Tom Trbojevic
Peta Hiku
Tom Symonds
Cheyse Blair
James Hasson
Feleti Mateo
Jesse Sene-Lefao
Josh Starling
Michael Chee-Kam
Blake Leary
Dunamis Lui

=== Melbourne Storm ===
Player
Will Chambers (C)
Young Tonumaipea
Kenny Bromwich
Kurt Mann
Richie Kennar
Dayne Weston
Cameron Munster
Hymel Hunt
Tim Glasby
Marika Koroibete
Travis Robinson
Christian Welch
Ben Hampton
Billy Brittain
Francis Tualau
Nelson Asofa-Solomona
Suliasi Vunivalu
Shaun Nona

=== Newcastle Knights ===
Player
Jarrod Mullen (C)
Sione Mata'utia
Jake Mamo
Dane Gagai
Chanel Mata'utia
Carlos Tuimavave
Tyrone Roberts
Pat Mata'utia
Adam Clydsdale
Paterika Vaivai
Tyler Randell
Chris Houston
Robbie Rochow
Nathan Ross
Korbin Sims
Joseph Tapine
Jack Stockwell
Danny Levi

=== North Queensland Cowboys ===
Player
Gavin Cooper (C)
Michael Morgan
Justin O'Neill
Tautau Moga
Kyle Feldt
Matthew Wright
Ray Thompson
Robert Lui
John Asiata
Rory Kostjasyn
Kelepi Tanginoa
Ethan Lowe
Jason Taumalolo
Jake Granville
Zac Santo
Coen Hess
Javid Bowen
Ben Spina

=== Parramatta Eels ===
Player
Chris Sandow (C)
Semi Radradra
John Folau
Brad Takairangi
Reece Robinson
Corey Norman
Junior Paulo
Kaysa Pritchard
Peni Terepo
Manu Ma'u
Tepai Moeroa
Joseph Paulo
David Gower
Kenny Edwards
Halauafu Lavaka
Pauli Pauli
Luke Kelly
Bureta Faraimo

=== Penrith Panthers ===
Player
Brendan Attwood
Christian Crichton
Joshua Jay
Isaac John
Apisai Koroisau
Kieran Moss
Andy Saunders
Nathan Smith
Tupou Sopoaga
Reagan Campbell-Gillard
Adrian Davis
George Jennings
Kevin Kingston
Sika Manu
Ben Murdoch-Masila
Chris Smith
Will Smith
Isaah Yeo

=== South Sydney Rabbitohs ===
Player
Issac Luke (C)
Joel Reddy
Bryson Goodwin
Dylan Walker
Matt King
Chris McQueen
Adam Reynolds
George Burgess
Angus Crichton
Ben Lowe
Jason Clark
Tom Hughes
Dave Tyrrell
Aaron Gray
Kyle Turner
Cameron McInnes
Chris Grevsmuhl
Setefano Taukafa

=== St. George Illawarra Dragons ===
No.	Player
1	Josh Dugan
2	Yaw Kiti Glymin
3	Euan Aitken
4	Peter Mata'utia
5	Jason Nightingale
6	Shannon Crook
7	Benji Marshall (C)
8	Mike Cooper
9	Craig Garvey
10	Dan Hunt
11	Tyson Frizell
12	Will Matthews
13	Joel Thompson
14	Nathan Green
15	Heath L'Estrange
16	Beau Henry
17	Eto Nabuli
18	Shannon Wakeman

=== Sydney Roosters ===
Player
Mitchell Pearce (C)
Jared Waerea-Hargreaves (C)
Mitchell Aubusson
Brendan Elliot
Kane Evans
Jackson Hastings
Samisoni Langi
Nene Macdonald
James Maloney
Willie Manu
Sam Moa
Taane Milne
Dylan Napa
Lagi Setu
Nathan Stapleton
Siosiua Taukeiaho
Roger Tuivasa-Sheck
Mitchell Williams

=== New Zealand Warriors ===
Player
Shaun Johnson (C)
Matthew Allwood
Nathan Friend
Ben Henry
Ryan Hoffman
Solomone Kata
Ngani Laumape
Sam Lisone
Tuimoala Lolohea
Sione Lousi
Suaia Matagi
Ben Matulino
Ken Maumalo
Nathaniel Roache
Bodene Thompson
Sam Tomkins
Chad Townsend
Manu Vatuvei

=== Wests Tigers ===
Player
Sitaleki Akauola
Nathan Brown
Jack Buchanan
Manaia Cherrington
Josh Drinkwater
Asipeli Fine
Salesi Funaki
Delouise Hoeter
Chris Lawrence
Lamar Liolevave
Kyle Lovett
Joel Luani
Kevin Naiqama
Pat Richards
Brenden Santi
Ava Seumanufagai
Tim Simona
Sauaso Sue

=== Jillaroos ===
Player
Steph Hancock (C)
Sam Hammond
Karina Brown
Jenni-Sue Hoepper
Annette Brander
Deanna Turner
Ali Brigginshaw
Maddie Studdon
Brittany Breayley
Heather Ballinger
Kezie Apps
Vanessa Foliaki
Ruan Sims
Julie Young
Kellye Hodges
Nikki Richards

=== Kiwi Ferns ===
Player
Sarina Fiso (C)
Maitua Feterika
Teuila Fotu-Moala
Georgia Hale
Chanel Huddleston
Nora Maaka
Kelly Maipi
Laura Mariu
Krystal Murray
Hilda Peters
Kahurangi Peters
Rona Peters
Krystal Rota
Atawhai Tupaea
Janna Vaughan
Sharnita Woodman
