= 2014 Rugby League Four Nations squads =

== Squads ==
=== Australia ===
Head Coach: (Australia) Tim Sheens

- On 12 October, Tim Sheens named the following players as part of his squad in preparation for the tournament. Of the twenty four players, twenty three were Australian born while one was New Zealand born.

Player	Games	Points	Position	2014 Club
Cameron Smith (C)	4	22	HK	(Australia) Melbourne Storm
Greg Inglis	4	16	FB	(Australia) South Sydney Rabbitohs
Matt Moylan*	0	0	FB	(Australia) Penrith Panthers
Alex Johnston	0	0	WG	(Australia) South Sydney Rabbitohs
Josh Mansour	4	4	WG	(Australia) Penrith Panthers
Sione Mata'utia	3	4	WG	(Australia) Newcastle Knights
Daniel Tupou	1	0	WG	(Australia) Sydney Roosters
Michael Jennings	4	8	CE	(Australia) Sydney Roosters
Dylan Walker	4	0	CE	(Australia) South Sydney Rabbitohs
Daly Cherry-Evans	4	8	SH	(Australia) Manly-Warringah Sea Eagles
Cooper Cronk	4	8	SH	(Australia) Melbourne Storm
Ben Hunt	3	8	SH	(Australia) Brisbane Broncos
David Klemmer	3	4	PR	(Australia) Canterbury-Bankstown Bulldogs
Josh Papalii	4	4	PR	(Australia) Canberra Raiders
Aaron Woods	4	0	PR	(Australia) Wests Tigers
Robbie Farah	1	0	HK	(Australia) Wests Tigers
Boyd Cordner	3	0	SR	(Australia) Sydney Roosters
Aidan Guerra	2	0	SR	(Australia) Sydney Roosters
Ryan Hoffman	1	0	SR	(Australia) Melbourne Storm
Josh Jackson	2	0	SR	(Australia) Canterbury-Bankstown Bulldogs
Beau Scott	2	4	SR	(Australia) Newcastle Knights
Sam Thaiday	4	0	SR	(Australia) Brisbane Broncos
Greg Bird	4	0	LF	(Australia) Gold Coast Titans
Corey Parker	4	0	LF	(Australia) Brisbane Broncos

* Replaced Jarryd Hayne on October 15 after his withdrawal.

=== England ===
Head Coach: (England) Steve McNamara

- On 5 October, Steve McNamara named the following 24 players as part of his squad in preparation for the tournament. Of the twenty four players, twenty three were English born while one was Australian born.

Player	Games	Points	Position	2014 Club
Sean O'Loughlin (C)	2	0	LF	(England) Wigan Warriors
Zak Hardaker	0	0	FB	(England) Leeds Rhinos
Sam Tomkins	3	4	FB	New Zealand Warriors
Joe Burgess	0	0	WG	(England) Wigan Warriors
Josh Charnley	3	4	WG	(England) Wigan Warriors
Ryan Hall	3	12	WG	(England) Leeds Rhinos
Dan Sarginson	2	0	CE	(England) Wigan Warriors
Michael Shenton	1	4	CE	(England) Castleford Tigers
Kallum Watkins	3	8	CE	(England) Leeds Rhinos
Stefan Ratchford	0	0	SO	(England) Warrington Wolves
Gareth Widdop	3	18	SO	(Australia) St. George Illawarra Dragons
Matty Smith	3	0	SH	(England) Wigan Warriors
George Burgess	3	0	PR	(Australia) South Sydney Rabbitohs
Tom Burgess	3	0	PR	(Australia) South Sydney Rabbitohs
Mike Cooper	0	0	PR	(Australia) St. George Illawarra Dragons
James Graham (vc)	3	0	PR	(Australia) Canterbury-Bankstown Bulldogs
Chris Hill	3	0	PR	(England) Warrington Wolves
Daryl Clark	3	0	HK	(England) Castleford Tigers
Josh Hodgson	2	0	HK	(England) Hull Kingston Rovers
Liam Farrell	3	4	SR	(England) Wigan Warriors
Brett Ferres	3	0	SR	(England) Huddersfield Giants
Joel Tomkins	3	4	SR	(England) Wigan Warriors
Elliott Whitehead	1	0	SR	(France) Catalans Dragons
Joe Westerman	1	0	LF	(England) Hull F.C.

=== New Zealand ===
Head Coach: (New Zealand) Stephen Kearney

- On 6 October, Stephen Kearney named 24 players as part of his squad in preparation for the tournament. Of the twenty four players, twenty were New Zealand born while four were Australian born.

Player	Games	Points	Position	2014 Club
Simon Mannering (C)	4	0	SR	New Zealand Warriors
Josh Hoffman^{1}	0	0	FB	(Australia) Brisbane Broncos
Peta Hiku	4	0	FB	(Australia) Manly-Warringah Sea Eagles
Sosaia Feki	0	0	WG	(Australia) Cronulla-Sutherland Sharks
Jason Nightingale	4	20	WG	(Australia) St. George Illawarra Dragons
Manu Vatuvei	3	12	WG	New Zealand Warriors
Gerard Beale	1	0	CE	(Australia) St. George Illawarra Dragons
Shaun Kenny-Dowall	4	4	CE	(Australia) Sydney Roosters
Dean Whare	4	4	CE	(Australia) Penrith Panthers
Kieran Foran (vc)	4	4	SO	(Australia) Manly-Warringah Sea Eagles
Shaun Johnson	4	30	SH	New Zealand Warriors
Jesse Bromwich	4	0	PR	(Australia) Melbourne Storm
Suaia Matagi	1	0	PR	New Zealand Warriors
Martin Taupau	4	0	PR	(Australia) Wests Tigers
Siliva Havili	0	0	HK	New Zealand Warriors
Thomas Leuluai	2	0	HK	New Zealand Warriors
Issac Luke	3	0	HK	(Australia) South Sydney Rabbitohs
Lewis Brown	3	4	SR	(Australia) Penrith Panthers
Greg Eastwood	3	0	SR	(Australia) Canterbury-Bankstown Bulldogs
Kevin Proctor	4	4	SR	(Australia) Melbourne Storm
Bodene Thompson^{2}	0	0	SR	(Australia) Wests Tigers
Adam Blair	4	0	SR	(Australia) Wests Tigers
Tohu Harris	4	0	LF	(Australia) Melbourne Storm
Jason Taumalolo	4	0	LF	(Australia) North Queensland Cowboys

^{1} Replaced Dallin Watene-Zelezniak who withdrew due to injury on October 22.

^{2} Replaced Sam Moa who withdrew due to family reasons on October 17.

=== Samoa ===
Head Coach: (Australia) Matt Parish

- On 7 October, Matt Parish named 23 players as part of his squad in preparation for the tournament. Of the twenty four players, twelve were New Zealand born while ten were Australian born and just two Samoan borns.

Player	Games	Points	Position	2014 Club
David Fa'alogo (C)	3	4	PR	(Australia) Newcastle Knights
Tim Lafai	2	6	WG	(Australia) Canterbury-Bankstown Bulldogs
Dominique Peyroux	1	0	WG	New Zealand Warriors
Daniel Vidot	3	8	WG	(Australia) Brisbane Broncos
Antonio Winterstein	2	4	WG	(Australia) North Queensland Cowboys
Joey Leilua	3	4	CE	(Australia) Newcastle Knights
Ricky Leutele	1	0	CE	(Australia) Cronulla-Sutherland Sharks
Tautau Moga	1	4	CE	(Australia) North Queensland Cowboys
Tim Simona	3	4	CE	(Australia) Wests Tigers
Ben Roberts	3	6	SO	(Australia) Melbourne Storm
Kyle Stanley	3	6	SO	(Australia) St. George Illawarra Dragons
Dunamis Lui	2	0	PR	(Australia) Manly-Warringah Sea Eagles
Isaac Liu	3	4	PR	(Australia) Sydney Roosters
Mose Masoe	3	0	PR	(England) St. Helens
Sam Tagataese	1	0	FR	(Australia) Cronulla-Sutherland Sharks
Josh McGuire^{1}	3	0	FR	(Australia) Brisbane Broncos
Pita Godinet	3	8	HK	(England) Wakefield Trinity Wildcats
Penani Manumalealii	0	0	HK	(Australia) Cronulla-Sutherland Sharks
Michael Sio	1	0	HK	New Zealand Warriors
Leeson Ah Mau	3	0	SR	(Australia) St. George Illawarra Dragons
Jesse Sene-Lefao^{2}	2	0	SR	(Australia) Manly-Warringah Sea Eagles
Frank Pritchard	3	0	SR	(Australia) Canterbury-Bankstown Bulldogs
Reni Maitua	1	0	LF	(Australia) Canterbury-Bankstown Bulldogs
Sauaso Sue	2	0	LF	(Australia) Wests Tigers

^{1} Added to the squad on October 15 taking their squad number to 24.

^{2} Replaced Suaia Matagi on October 11 as he had also been named in the New Zealand squad and opted to play for them.
