= 2014 Rugby League Four Nations =

2014 Four Nations
- Number of teams: 4
- Host countries: New Zealand; Australia
- Winner: New Zealand (2nd title)
- Matches played: 7
- Attendance: 144,722 (20,675 per match)
- Points scored: 286 (40.86 per match)
- Tries scored: 52 (7.43 per match)
- Top scorer: (New Zealand) Shaun Johnson (30)
- Top try scorer: (New Zealand) Jason Nightingale (5)

The 2014 Rugby League Four Nations tournament was the fourth staging of the Rugby League Four Nations tournament played in Australia and New Zealand over three weeks from Saturday, 25 October to Saturday, 15 November 2014. The series was contested by regular participants Australia, England and New Zealand, joined by Samoa, having won their Pacific qualifier against Fiji. New Zealand won the tournament, defeating Australia in the final at Wellington's Westpac Stadium on Saturday 15 November.

== Background ==
The 2014 tournament is the first Four Nations series to be scheduled following the 2013 Rugby League World Cup, with the venues rotating between Europe and the South Pacific.

In addition to automatic inclusions Australia, England and New Zealand, Pacific nations Fiji and Samoa met in a mid-season test match at the Penrith Stadium in western Sydney to determine the fourth entrant in the tournament. Samoa won an entertaining match 32-16 in front of 9,063 fans.

The 34,500 capacity Westpac Stadium in Wellington will play host to the first Four Nations Final played in New Zealand. The last time the final of the tournament was held in New Zealand was at the Mount Smart Stadium in Auckland when the tournament was known as the Tri-Nations in its inaugural year, 1999.

== Teams ==
Team	Coach	Captain	RLIF Rank	Continent
Australia	Tim Sheens	Cameron Smith	1st	Oceania
England	Steve McNamara	Sean O'Loughlin	3rd	Europe
New Zealand	Stephen Kearney	Simon Mannering	2nd	Oceania
Samoa	Matt Parish	David Fa'alogo	7th	Oceania

== Venues ==
The games were played at the following venues in Australia and New Zealand. The tournament final was played in Wellington.

Wellington	Brisbane	Whangārei
Westpac Stadium	Suncorp Stadium	Toll Stadium
Capacity: 34,500	Capacity: 52,500	Capacity: 30,000
Melbourne	Dunedin	Wollongong
AAMI Park	Forsyth Barr Stadium	WIN Stadium
Capacity: 30,050	Capacity: 30,748	Capacity: 23,750

== Referees ==
- Henry Perenara (Referee and Video Referee - New Zealand)
- Phil Bentham (Referee - England)
- Gerard Sutton (Referee - Australia)
- Ben Cummins (Replacement Referee - Australia)

=== Touch judges/video referees ===
- Anthony Eliott (Touch Judge - New Zealand)
- Grant Atkins (Touch Judge - Australia)
- Jason Walsh (Touch Judge - Australia)
- Robert Hicks (Touch Judge - England)
- Ian Smith (Video Referee - England)
- Bernard Sutton (Video Referee - Australia)

== Qualifier ==
=== Samoa v. Fiji ===
3 May 2014

Samoa	32–16	Fiji
Tries: Penani Manumalealii (3) 13' c, 38' c, 44' c Carlos Tuimavave 54'c Daniel Vidot 64'c Sam Tagataese 78'; Goals: Krisnan Inu (6/6) 13', 38', 44', 50', 54', 64'	Video	Tries: Kevin Naiqama 16' c James Storer 27' c Lote Tuqiri 30' m Goals: Lote Tuqiri (2/3) 17', 28'

Penrith Stadium, Sydney, Australia
Attendance: 9,063
Referee: Ashley Klein (Australia)
Player of the Match: Penani Manumalealii (Samoa)

Samoa won the test match by 32–16 after being behind 16–12 at half-time. Samoa's Penani Manumalealii won the man of the match award, scoring 3 tries in the match.

Samoa picked 7 debutantes for the test match, while Fiji featured three. All of the Samoan team were National Rugby League based players, while the Fijian side had 10 players from the NRL. Samoa's most capped player was Daniel Vidot who made his 6th appearance for his country, while Fiji's most experienced players were Alipate Noilea, Aaron Groom, and captain Ashton Sims who all made their 10th appearance for their nation.

== Results ==
=== Round 1 ===
Saturday, 25 October 2014
5:00pm (AEDT)

England	32–26	Samoa
Tries: Michael Shenton 21' c Kallum Watkins 34' c Liam Farrell 46' c Joel Tomkins 65' c Sam Tomkins 68' c Goals: Gareth Widdop (6/6) 22', 34', 40', 46', 65', 68'	Report	Tries: Isaac Liu 26' c Daniel Vidot 30' m Pita Godinet (2) 55' c, 61' c Antonio Winterstein 72' c Goals: Kyle Stanley (3/4) 26', 55', 61'; Ben Roberts (1/1) 72'

Suncorp Stadium, Brisbane, Australia
Attendance: 47,813
Referee: Gerard Sutton (Australia)
Player of the Match: Sam Tomkins (England)

- Ben Roberts made his 10th appearance for Samoa, only the second player to hit double-digit appearances for his country with George Carmont being the first.

FB	1	Sam Tomkins
RW	2	Josh Charnley
RC	3	Kallum Watkins
LC	4	Michael Shenton
LW	5	Ryan Hall
SO	6	Gareth Widdop
SH	7	Matty Smith
PR	8	George Burgess
HK	9	Josh Hodgson
PR	10	James Graham (c)
SR	11	Liam Farrell
SR	12	Joel Tomkins
LF	13	Joe Westerman
Substitutions:
BE	14	Daryl Clark
BE	15	Brett Ferres
BE	16	Tom Burgess
BE	17	Chris Hill
Coach:
(England) Steve McNamara

FB	1	Tim Simona
RW	2	Antonio Winterstein
RC	3	Ricky Leutele
LC	4	Joey Leilua
LW	5	Daniel Vidot
FE	6	Ben Roberts
HB	7	Kyle Stanley
PR	8	Sam Tagataese
HK	9	Michael Sio
PR	10	David Fa'alogo (c)
SR	11	Frank Pritchard
SR	12	Leeson Ah Mau
LK	13	Josh McGuire
Substitutions:
BE	14	Pita Godinet
BE	15	Jesse Sene-Lefao
BE	16	Isaac Liu
BE	17	Mose Masoe
Coach:
(Australia) Matt Parish

Saturday, 25 October 2014
7:30pm (AEDT)

Australia	12–30	New Zealand
Tries: Beau Scott 3' c Greg Inglis 21' c Goal: Cameron Smith (2/2) 3', 21'	Report	Tries: Proctor 17' c Lewis Brown 29' c Shaun Johnson 47' c Dean Whare 51' c Jason Nightingale 68' c Goals: Shaun Johnson (5/5) 17', 29', 47', 51', 68'

Suncorp Stadium, Brisbane, Australia
Attendance: 47,813
Referee: Phil Bentham (England)
Player of the Match: Shaun Johnson (New Zealand)

- Dallin Watene-Zelezniak could have made his international test debut in the starting XIII for New Zealand on the right-wing, but was ruled out for the game and for the rest of the tournament with an ankle injury and Gerard Beale replaced him.
- Jason Taumalolo made his international test debut for New Zealand.
- Daniel Tupou, Josh Mansour, Dylan Walker, Aaron Woods and Aidan Guerra made their international test debut for Australia
- With the victory, this was New Zealand's first Test win over Australia since the 2010 Four Nations Final.

FB	1	Greg Inglis
RW	2	Josh Mansour
RC	3	Michael Jennings
LC	4	Dylan Walker
LW	5	Daniel Tupou
SO	6	Johnathan Thurston
SH	7	Cooper Cronk
PR	8	Aaron Woods
HK	9	Cameron Smith (c)
PR	10	Sam Thaiday
SR	11	Beau Scott
SR	12	Ryan Hoffman
LF	13	Greg Bird
Substitutions:
BE	14	Robbie Farah
BE	15	Aidan Guerra
BE	16	Josh Papalii
BE	17	Corey Parker
Coach:
(Australia) Tim Sheens

FB	1	Peta Hiku
RW	19	Gerard Beale
RC	3	Shaun Kenny-Dowall
LC	4	Dean Whare
LW	2	Jason Nightingale
FE	6	Kieran Foran
HB	7	Shaun Johnson
PR	8	Jesse Bromwich
HK	9	Thomas Leuluai
PR	10	Adam Blair
SR	11	Simon Mannering (c)
SR	12	Kevin Proctor
LK	13	Jason Taumalolo
Substitutions:
BE	14	Lewis Brown
BE	15	Greg Eastwood
BE	16	Martin Taupau
BE	17	Tohu Harris
Coach:
(New Zealand) Stephen Kearney

=== Round 2 ===
Saturday, 1 November 2014
4:00pm (NZT)

New Zealand	14–12	Samoa
Tries: Kieran Foran 10' c Jason Nightingale 64'; Shaun Kenny-Dowall 76'; Goals: Shaun Johnson (1/3) 11'	Report	Tries: Tautau Moga 6'; Daniel Vidot 18'; Joseph Leilua 44'; Goals: Tim Lafai (0/3)

Toll Stadium, Whangārei, New Zealand
Attendance: 16,912
Referee: Henry Perenara (New Zealand)
Player of the Match: Kieran Foran (New Zealand)

- Suaia Matagi made his international test debut for New Zealand
- Tautau Moga and Dominique Peyroux made their international test debut for Samoa
- With the victory, New Zealand retained the Peter Leitch QSM Challenge Trophy.

FB	1	Peta Hiku
RW	2	Jason Nightingale
RC	3	Shaun Kenny-Dowall
LC	4	Dean Whare
LW	5	Manu Vatuvei
FE	6	Kieran Foran
HB	7	Shaun Johnson
PR	8	Jesse Bromwich
HK	9	Issac Luke
PR	10	Adam Blair
SR	11	Simon Mannering (c)
SR	12	Kevin Proctor
LK	13	Jason Taumalolo
Substitutions:
BE	14	Lewis Brown
BE	15	Suaia Matagi
BE	16	Martin Taupau
BE	17	Tohu Harris
Coach:
(New Zealand) Stephen Kearney

FB	1	Tim Simona
RW	20	Tautau Moga
RC	3	Tim Lafai
LC	4	Joey Leilua
LW	5	Daniel Vidot
FE	6	Ben Roberts
HB	7	Kyle Stanley
PR	8	Isaac Liu
HK	13	Josh McGuire
PR	10	David Fa'alogo (c)
SR	11	Frank Pritchard
SR	12	Leeson Ah Mau
LK	16	Sauaso Sue
Substitutions:
BE	9	Pita Godinet
BE	14	Dunamis Lui
BE	17	Mose Masoe
BE	18	Dominique Peyroux
Coach:
(Australia) Matt Parish

Sunday, 2 November 2014
4:00pm (AEST)

Australia	16–12	England
Tries: Michael Jennings 16'; Ben Hunt 56' c Greg Inglis 62' c Goals: Cameron Smith (2/3) 57', 64'	Report	Tries: Kallum Watkins 28' c Ryan Hall 33' c Goals: Gareth Widdop (2/2) 29', 35'

AAMI Park, Melbourne, Australia
Attendance: 20,585
Referee: Gerard Sutton (Australia)
Player of the Match: Cameron Smith (Australia)

- Perth born Dan Sarginson made his international test début for England.
- Ben Hunt and David Klemmer made their international test debuts for Australia.
- Sione Mata'utia also made his international test début for Australia and becoming the youngest ever player to play for Australia at aged 18 years and 129 days, eclipsing Israel Folau's seven-year-old record by 65 days.
- Cameron Smith becomes the 6th Kangaroo-Test player, to play 40-Test games for Australia.

FB	1	Greg Inglis
RW	2	Josh Mansour
RC	3	Michael Jennings
LC	4	Dylan Walker
LW	5	Sione Mata'utia
SO	6	Johnathan Thurston
SH	7	Daly Cherry-Evans
PR	8	Aaron Woods
HK	9	Cameron Smith (c)
PR	10	Sam Thaiday
SR	11	Beau Scott
SR	12	Greg Bird
LF	13	Corey Parker
Substitutions:
BE	14	Boyd Cordner
BE	15	Ben Hunt
BE	16	David Klemmer
BE	17	Josh Papalii
Coach:
(Australia) Tim Sheens

FB	1	Sam Tomkins
RW	2	Josh Charnley
RC	3	Kallum Watkins
LC	18	Dan Sarginson
LW	5	Ryan Hall
SO	6	Gareth Widdop
SH	7	Matty Smith
PR	8	George Burgess
HK	9	Josh Hodgson
PR	10	James Graham
SR	11	Liam Farrell
SR	12	Joel Tomkins
LF	19	Sean O'Loughlin (c)
Substitutions:
BE	14	Daryl Clark
BE	15	Brett Ferres
BE	16	Tom Burgess
BE	17	Chris Hill
Coach:
(England) Steve McNamara

=== Round 3 ===
Saturday, 8 November 2014
7:00pm (NZT)

New Zealand	16–14	England
Tries: Jason Nightingale (2) 2' c, 29' c Manu Vatuvei 45'; Goals: Shaun Johnson (2/3) 3', 31'	Report	Tries: Ryan Hall (2) 7', 56' c Josh Charnley 24'; Goals: Gareth Widdop (1/3) 58'

Forsyth Barr Stadium, Dunedin, New Zealand
Attendance: 15,863
Referee: Phil Bentham (England)
Player of the Match: Jason Taumalolo (New Zealand)

- With the victory, New Zealand secured a place in the final.

FB	1	Peta Hiku
RW	2	Jason Nightingale
RC	3	Shaun Kenny-Dowall
LC	4	Dean Whare
LW	5	Manu Vatuvei
FE	6	Kieran Foran
HB	7	Shaun Johnson
PR	8	Jesse Bromwich
HK	14	Thomas Leuluai
PR	10	Adam Blair
SR	11	Simon Mannering (c)
SR	12	Kevin Proctor
LK	13	Jason Taumalolo
Substitutions:
BE	9	Issac Luke
BE	15	Greg Eastwood
BE	16	Martin Taupau
BE	17	Tohu Harris
Coach:
(New Zealand) Stephen Kearney

FB	1	Sam Tomkins
RW	2	Josh Charnley
RC	3	Kallum Watkins
LC	4	Dan Sarginson
LW	5	Ryan Hall
SO	6	Gareth Widdop
SH	7	Matty Smith
PR	8	George Burgess
HK	14	Daryl Clark
PR	10	James Graham
SR	11	Liam Farrell
SR	12	Joel Tomkins
LF	13	Sean O'Loughlin (c)
Substitutions:
BE	15	Brett Ferres
BE	16	Tom Burgess
BE	17	Chris Hill
BE	18	Elliott Whitehead
Coach:
(England) Steve McNamara

Sunday, 9 November 2014
4:00pm (AEST)

Australia	44–18	Samoa
Tries: Cooper Cronk (2) 2', 62'; Greg Inglis (2) 11', 26'; Daly Cherry-Evans 30'; David Klemmer 34'; Josh Papalii 76'; Josh Mansour 79'; Goals: Cameron Smith (4/6); Daly Cherry-Evans (2/2)	Report	Tries: Tim Simona 20'; Ben Roberts 47'; David Fa'alogo 69'; Goals: Tim Lafai (3/3)

WIN Stadium, Wollongong, Australia
Attendance: 18,456
Referee: Gerard Sutton (Australia)
Player of the Match: Greg Inglis (Australia)

- Josh Jackson made his international test debut for Australia.
- With the victory, Australia secured a place in the final.

FB	1	Greg Inglis
RW	2	Josh Mansour
RC	3	Michael Jennings
LC	4	Dylan Walker
LW	5	Sione Mata'utia
SO	6	Daly Cherry-Evans
SH	7	Cooper Cronk
PR	8	Aaron Woods
HK	9	Cameron Smith (c)
PR	10	Josh Papalii
SR	11	Sam Thaiday
SR	12	Greg Bird
LF	13	Corey Parker
Substitutions:
BE	14	Boyd Cordner
BE	15	Ben Hunt
BE	19	David Klemmer
BE	21	Josh Jackson
Coach:
(Australia) Tim Sheens

FB	1	Tim Simona
RW	2	Antonio Winterstein
RC	3	Tim Lafai
LC	4	Joey Leilua
LW	5	Daniel Vidot
FE	6	Ben Roberts
HB	7	Kyle Stanley
PR	8	Isaac Liu
HK	13	Josh McGuire
PR	10	David Fa'alogo (c)
SR	11	Frank Pritchard
SR	12	Leeson Ah Mau
LK	17	Mose Masoe
Substitutions:
BE	9	Pita Godinet
BE	14	Dunamis Lui
BE	15	Reni Maitua
BE	16	Sauaso Sue
Coach:
(Australia) Matt Parish

=== Standings ===
2014 Four Nations
Pos	Team	Pld	W	D	L	PF	PA	PD	Pts	Qualification
1	New Zealand	3	3	0	0	60	38	+22	6	Qualification for Final
2	Australia	3	2	0	1	72	60	+12	4	Qualification for Final
3	England	3	1	0	2	58	58	0	2	
4	Samoa	3	0	0	3	56	90	−34	0	

Source: BBC Sport

=== Final ===
Saturday, 15 November
8:30pm (NZT)

New Zealand	22–18	Australia
Tries; Manu Vatuvei (35', 63') 2 Jason Nightingale (23') 1 Shaun Johnson (58') 1 Goals; Shaun Johnson 3/5 (25', 29' pen, 36')	Report	Tries; 1 (11') Michael Jennings; 1 (42') Sione Mata'utia; 1 (76') Ben Hunt; Goals; 3/3 Cameron Smith (12', 43', 77')

Westpac Stadium, Wellington, New Zealand
Attendance: 25,093
Referee: Phil Bentham (England)
Player of the Match: Shaun Johnson (New Zealand)

New Zealand	Position	Australia
Peta Hiku	FB	Greg Inglis
Jason Nightingale	WG	Josh Mansour
Dean Whare	CE	Michael Jennings
Shaun Kenny-Dowall	CE	Dylan Walker
Manu Vatuvei	WG	Sione Mata'utia
Kieran Foran	FE	Daly Cherry-Evans
Shaun Johnson	HB	Cooper Cronk
Jesse Bromwich	PR	Aaron Woods
Isaac Luke	HK	Cameron Smith (c)
Adam Blair	PR	Josh Papalii
Simon Mannering (c)	SR	Sam Thaiday
Kevin Proctor	SR	Greg Bird
Jason Taumalolo	LK	Corey Parker
Lewis Brown	Int	Boyd Cordner
Greg Eastwood	Int	Ben Hunt
Martin Taupau	Int	Josh Jackson
Tohu Harris	Int	David Klemmer

Score Progression:
11th: Australia 6 - 0 (Jennings Try, Smith Goal) 23rd: Even 6 - 6 (Nightingale Try, Johnson Goal) 29th: New Zealand 8 - 6 (Johnson Penalty Goal) 35th: New Zealand 14 - 6 (Vatuvei Try, Johnson Goal) 42nd: New Zealand 14 - 12 (Mata'utia Try, Smith Goal) 58th: New Zealand 18 - 12 (Johnson Try) 63rd: New Zealand 22 - 12 (Vatuvei Try) 76th: New Zealand 22 - 18 (Hunt Try, Smith Goal)

Match records:

- This was Australia's first game at Wellington's Westpac Stadium since 2007, when they beat New Zealand 58-0.
- This was New Zealand's first home game at Wellington's Westpac Stadium since the 2010 Four Nations Round 1 clash with England, when they won 24-10.
- With the victory, New Zealand won this year's Four Nations Title, as well as their second Tournament Title.
- New Zealand became the second team since Australia (in the 2011 Four Nations series), to go through the tournament undefeated.
- New Zealand won 2 consecutive matches against Australia, for the first time since 1998.
- New Zealand earned their first victory over Australia at a home venue since 2003, when they won 30-16 over Australia at Auckland's North Harbour Stadium.
- Manu Vatuvei becomes New Zealand's all-time leading try-scorer, passing Nigel Vagana's record (of 19 tries) after scoring his second try in the game for a total of 20 test tries.
- Simon Mannering became the fifth Kiwi-Test player to play 40 tests for New Zealand.

== Player statistics ==
Top point scorers
	Player	Team	T	G	FG	Pts
1	Shaun Johnson	New Zealand	2	11	0	30
2	Cameron Smith	Australia	0	11	0	22
3	Jason Nightingale	New Zealand	5	0	0	20
4	Gareth Widdop	England	0	9	0	18
5	Greg Inglis	Australia	4	0	0	16

Top try scorers
	Player	Team	T
1	Jason Nightingale	New Zealand	5
2	Greg Inglis	Australia	4
3	Ryan Hall	England	3
3	Manu Vatuvei	New Zealand	3

== Broadcasting rights ==
In the United Kingdom, Premier Sports televised all the matches live while BBC Two televised England's round robin matches and the final live. BBC One televised highlights of matchday one while BBC Two televised highlights of matchday two while BBC One televised highlights of England's final round robin match against New Zealand while highlights of matchday three was televised on BBC Two in England and England HD at 10:00pm and in Northern Ireland at 10:30pm and in Scotland 11:00pm and in Wales at 11:30pm. BBC One televised highlights of the final.
