= Michael Chee-Kam =

Samoa international rugby league footballer

Michael Chee Kam
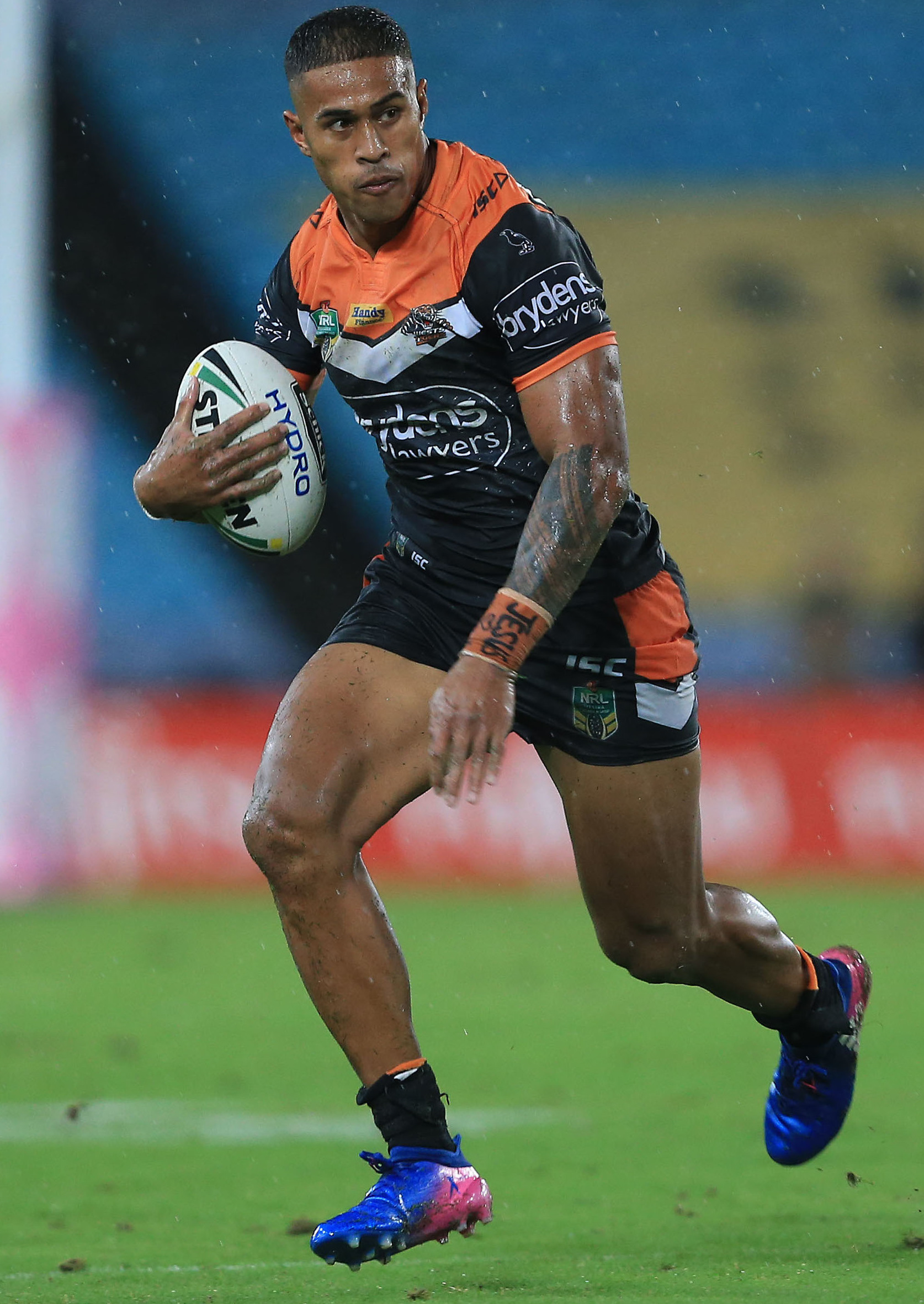

Personal information
- Full name: Michael Chee-Kam
- Born: 26 February 1992 (age 34) Auckland, New Zealand
- Height: 192 cm (6 ft 4 in)
- Weight: 100 kg (15 st 10 lb)

Playing information
- Position: Second-row, Centre
Club
Years	Team	Pld	T	G	FG	P
2014–15	Manly Sea Eagles	5	0	0	0	0
2016–21	Wests Tigers	89	11	0	0	44
2022–24	South Sydney	38	2	0	0	8
2025	Manly Sea Eagles	1	0	0	0	0
	Total	133	13	0	0	52
Representative
Years	Team	Pld	T	G	FG	P
2018–19	Samoa	3	0	0	0	0
2019	Samoa 9s	4	0	0	0	0
- Source: As of 8 August 2024
- Relatives: Tim Simona (cousin)

Michael Chee-Kam (born 26 February 1992) is a former Samoa international rugby league footballer who last played as a second-row forward or centre for the Manly Warringah Sea Eagles in the NRL.

He previously played for the Manly Warringah Sea Eagles the Wests Tigers and the South Sydney Rabbitohs in the National Rugby League.

== Background ==
Chee-Kam was born in Auckland, New Zealand, and is of Samoan and Chinese descent.

An alumnus of Tamaki College, he played his junior rugby league for the Mount Wellington Warriors, before being signed by the Melbourne Storm.

== Playing career ==
=== Early career ===
After playing in the lower grades at the Melbourne Storm, Chee-Kam joined the Canberra Raiders in 2010. From 2010 to 2012, he played for the Raiders' National Youth Competition (NYC) team. In November and December 2010, he played for the Australian Schoolboys. In May 2012, he signed a three-year contract with the Manly Warringah Sea Eagles starting in 2013. On 21 August 2012, he was named at second-row in the 2012 NYC Team of the Year.

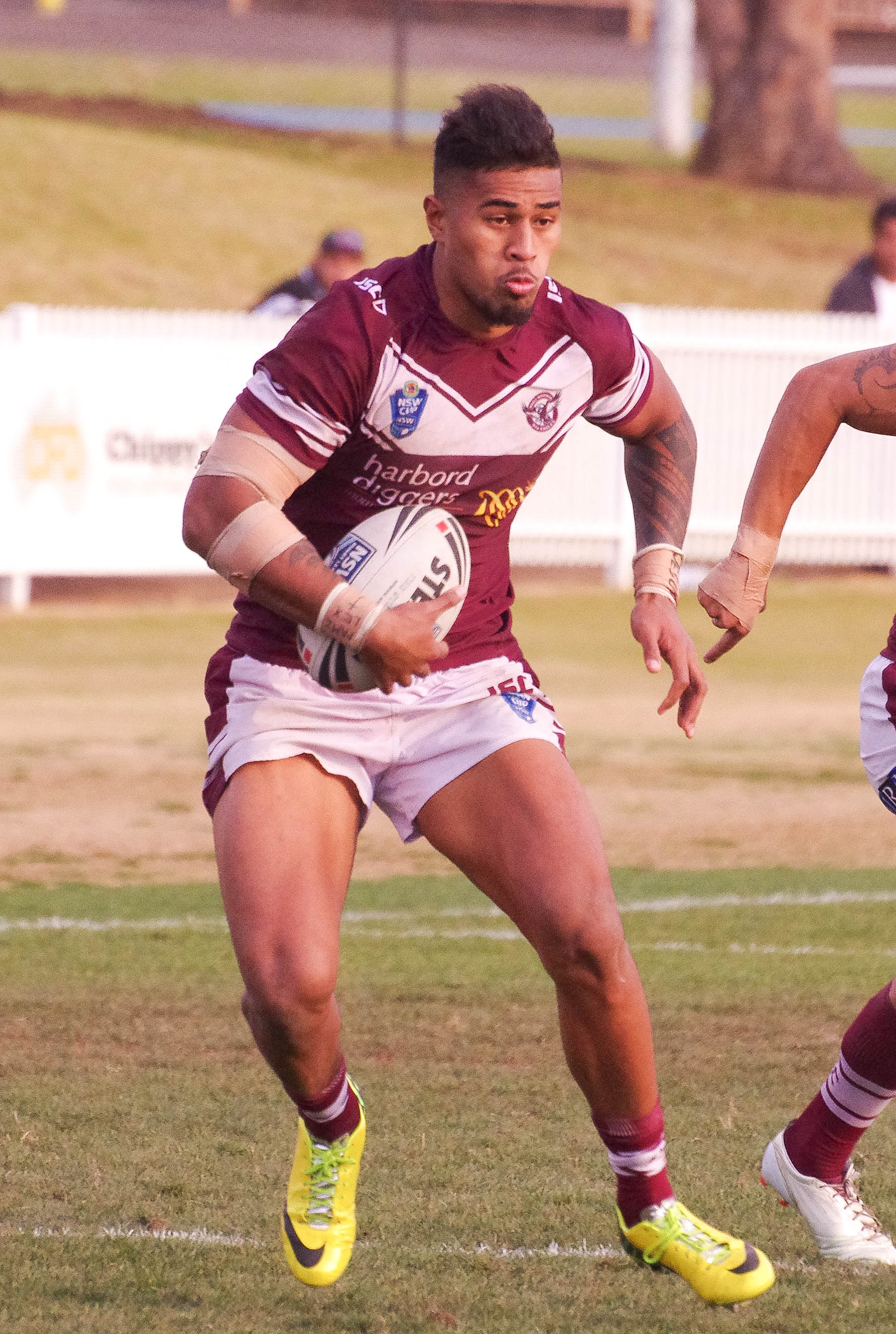
Chee-Kam playing for the Sea Eagles in 2014

=== 2014 ===
In Round 26 of the 2014 NRL season, Chee-Kam made his National Rugby League debut for the Manly-Warringah Sea Eagles against the North Queensland Cowboys.

=== 2015 ===
On 3 August 2015, after limited opportunities with Manly-Warringah, Chee-Kam signed a one-year contract with the Wests Tigers starting in 2016. After being told he was unwanted by Manly, he played 4 games for them towards the end of the season. He said, "I didn't think they were going to give me those games that I played at the end after they told me that, so I was pretty happy with those couple of games that I got. I used that to build my confidence and get some experience playing at the top level."

=== 2016 ===
In Round 9, Chee-Kam made his Tigers debut against the South Sydney Rabbitohs. On 25 May, he re-signed with the Tigers on a one-year contract.

=== 2017 ===
With Tim Simona de-registered by the NRL and Jamal Idris lacking the fitness to play 80 minutes, Chee-Kam was named at centre for the opening rounds of the season. He said, "I remember when I was on the fringes and seeing a couple of boys come off I would get a little opportunity and you have to make the most of it. I'm trying to feed off that. This is a small opportunity to hold this position and I need to make the most of it."

In April, Chee-Kam extended his contract to the end of the 2019 season, saying, "I feel like I've made a family here, I'm really close with all the boys and have made some great friendships and it's exciting to know I'll be here for a while longer. I want this to be my last club and I'm really grateful and blessed to have been given this opportunity." With further injuries to players (including centre Moses Suli), Chee-Kam remained in first grade for most of the season, playing 22 games. In round 13, he scored his first try in the match against the St. George Illawarra Dragons.

=== 2018 ===
Chee-Kam was again a regular in first grade in 2018, mostly playing from the bench. Towards the end of the season, he spent some time in the starting team. Playing on the left edge after an injury to Chris Lawrence, he was averaging 120 metres with the ball and 34 tackles per game in this period.

=== 2019 ===
In Round 5 against the Brisbane Broncos, Chee-Kam scored the match winning try for the Tigers as they won the game 22-16 at Suncorp Stadium. He had run from in-field with a minute remaining and proceeded to beat five Brisbane players to score next to the posts. In Round 15 against South Sydney, Chee-Kam scored the winning try for Wests in the final three minutes of the game in the club's 14-9 victory at the new Western Sydney Stadium. Chee-Kam played 22 games for Wests in the 2019 NRL season as the club finished ninth on the table and missed out on the finals. Wests had the chance to finish as high as seventh on the table but lost their final game of the season against Cronulla at Leichhardt Oval.

=== 2020 ===
In round 11 against Parramatta, Chee-Kam was taken from the field on a stretcher and sent to hospital after being knocked out attempting to tackle one of the Parramatta players. Chee Kam was then seen shaking on the ground after apparently suffering a seizure. Wests would go on to lose the match 26-16 at Bankwest Stadium. Chee-Kam made a total of nine appearances for the club as they finished 11th on the table and missed the finals.

=== 2021 ===
On 6 September, Chee Kam was one of five players who were released by the Wests Tigers club. On 14 October, Chee-Kam signed a one-year deal with South Sydney.

=== 2022 ===
Chee-Kam was limited to only six games for South Sydney in the 2022 NRL season. He played in all three of the clubs finals matches however, as they reached the preliminary final for a fifth straight season, losing to eventual premiers Penrith 32-12, which was Chee Kam’s 100th NRL game.

=== 2023 ===
In round 3 of the 2023 NRL season, Chee-Kam was sent to the sin bin during South Sydney's 20-18 loss against arch-rivals the Sydney Roosters. Chee-Kam played a total of 16 games throughout the year as South Sydney finished 9th on the table and missed the finals.

=== 2024 ===
Chee-Kam played a total of 16 games for South Sydney in the 2024 NRL season as the club finished 16th on the table. On 8 September, it was announced that Chee-Kam would be departing the South Sydney club after not being offered a new contract. On 14 November, Chee-Kam had signed on to return to the Manly Sea Eagles for 2025.

=== 2025 ===
Chee-Kam only made one appearance for Manly in the 2025 NRL season. During Manly's round 27 match, Chee-Kam was one of nine players that were farewelled. On 30 September, Chee-Kam announced his retirement from the sport.

== Statistics ==
Year	Team	Games	Tries	Pts
2014	Manly Warringah Sea Eagles	1	0	0
2015	Manly Warringah Sea Eagles	4	0	0
2016	Wests Tigers	5	0	0
2017	Wests Tigers	22	1	4
2018	Wests Tigers	22	3	12
2019	Wests Tigers	22	6	24
2020	Wests Tigers	9	0	0
2021	Wests Tigers	9	1	4
2022	South Sydney Rabbitohs	6	0	0
2023	South Sydney Rabbitohs	16	1	4
2024	South Sydney Rabbitohs	17	1	4
2025	Manly Warringah Sea Eagles	1	0	0
	Totals	133	13	52

== Assault charge ==
On 3 January 2019, Chee-Kam along with another man was charged by police for assaulting an Uber driver at Bondi Beach in Sydney's Eastern Suburbs. The alleged incident happened on Sunday 30 December 2018 at 10:30PM. Chee-Kam and the other man allegedly punched the driver multiple times through the driver's side window.

On 1 May 2019, Chee-Kam pleaded guilty to common assault. He was subsequently suspended for two matches by Wests Tigers and fined an undisclosed amount.
