= Lamar Liolevave =

Fiji international rugby league footballer

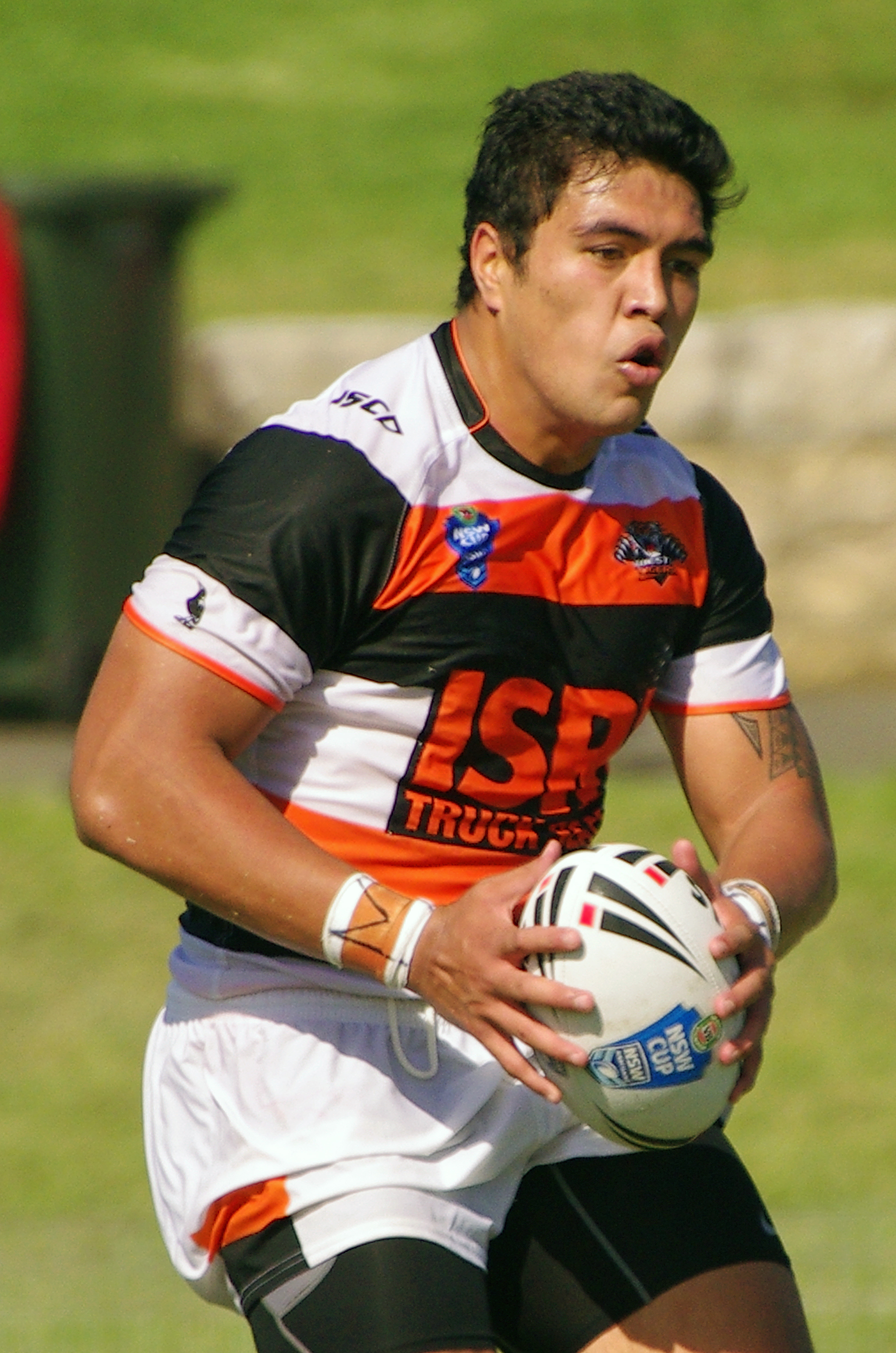

Personal information
- Full name: Lamar Manuel-Liolevave
- Born: 1 December 1995 (age 30) Auckland, New Zealand
- Height: 183 cm (6 ft 0 in)
- Weight: 102 kg (16 st 1 lb)

Playing information
- Position: Second-row, Lock
Club
Years	Team	Pld	T	G	FG	P
2015	Wests Tigers	1	0	0	0	0
Representative
Years	Team	Pld	T	G	FG	P
2019–	Fiji	7	0	0	0	0
- Source: As of 5 November 2022
- Education: Keebra Park State High School
- Relatives: Matthew Wright (cousin)

Lamar Manuel-Liolevave (born 1 December 1995) is a Fiji international rugby league footballer who plays as second-rower or lock for the Tweed Heads Seagulls in the Queensland Cup.

He previously played for the Wests Tigers in the NRL.

== Background ==
Born in Auckland, New Zealand, Liolevave is of Māori, Samoan and Fijian descent and played his junior rugby league for the Marist Saints. He later moved to Queensland, Australia to attend Keebra Park State High School. In July 2013, he signed a contract with the West Tigers starting in 2014.

== Playing career ==
=== Early career ===
In 2013, Liolevave played for the Australian Schoolboys.

In 2014 and 2015, Liolevave played for the Wests Tigers' NYC team. He was named the Tigers' NYC Coach's Player of the Year in 2014. On 18 October 2014, he played for the Junior Kiwis against the Junior Kangaroos, playing off the interchange bench in the Kiwis' 15-14 win. Soon after, he re-signed with the Wests Tigers on a two-year contract.

=== 2015 ===
Liolevave graduated to the Tigers' New South Wales Cup team in 2015. In round 4, he made his NRL debut for the Wests Tigers against the Canterbury-Bankstown Bulldogs.

On 2 May 2015, Liolevave again played for the Junior Kiwis against Junior Kangaroos.

=== 2016 ===
In April 2016, Liolevave joined the Canterbury-Bankstown Bulldogs effective immediately on a contract to the end of 2017.

=== 2019 ===
He made his international debut, coming off the bench, in the 18-44 win against Samoa on 2 November 2019.
