= Yaw Kiti Glymin =

Australian rugby league footballer

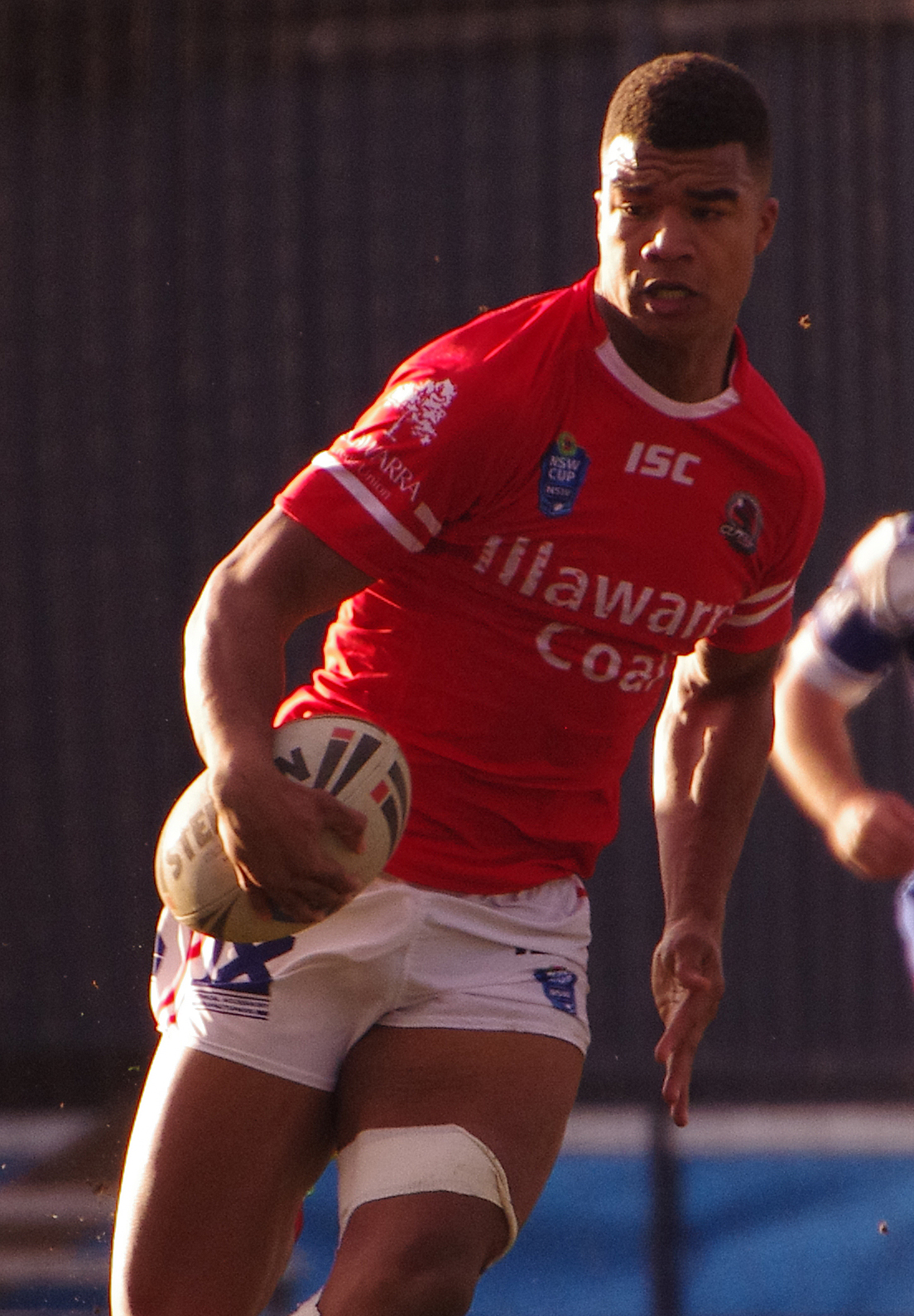
- Glymin playing for the Illawarra Cutters in 2014

Personal information
- Full name: Yaw Kiti Glymin
- Born: 22 July 1993 (age 32) Arncliffe, New South Wales, Australia
- Height: 185 cm (6 ft 1 in)
- Weight: 96 kg (15 st 2 lb)

Playing information
- Position: Wing
Club
Years	Team	Pld	T	G	FG	P
2015	St. George Illawarra	1	0	0	0	0
- Source: As of 29 January 2019

Yaw Kiti Glymin (born 22 July 1993) is an Australian rugby league footballer on the wing position. He played for the St. George Illawarra Dragons in the National Rugby League.

== Background ==
Glymin was born in Arncliffe, New South Wales and is of Ghanaian descent. He played his junior rugby league for the Arncliffe Scots, before being signed by the St. George Illawarra Dragons.

== Playing career ==
Progressing through the St. George Illawarra Dragons Harold Matthews Cup and S. G. Ball Cup squads, Glymin played for the Dragons' NYC team in 2012 and 2013, before moving on to the Dragons' NSW Cup team, Illawarra Cutters in 2014. On 27 October 2014, he re-signed with St. George on a one-year contract.

In round 17 of the 2015 NRL season, Glymin made his debut for St. George against the North Queensland Cowboys. On 12 August 2015, he re-signed with St. George on a two-year contract.

Glymin was released by St. George at the end of 2017 after making a single appearance due to injuries.
