= Jesse Sene-Lefao =

Samoa international rugby league footballer

Jesse Sene Lefao
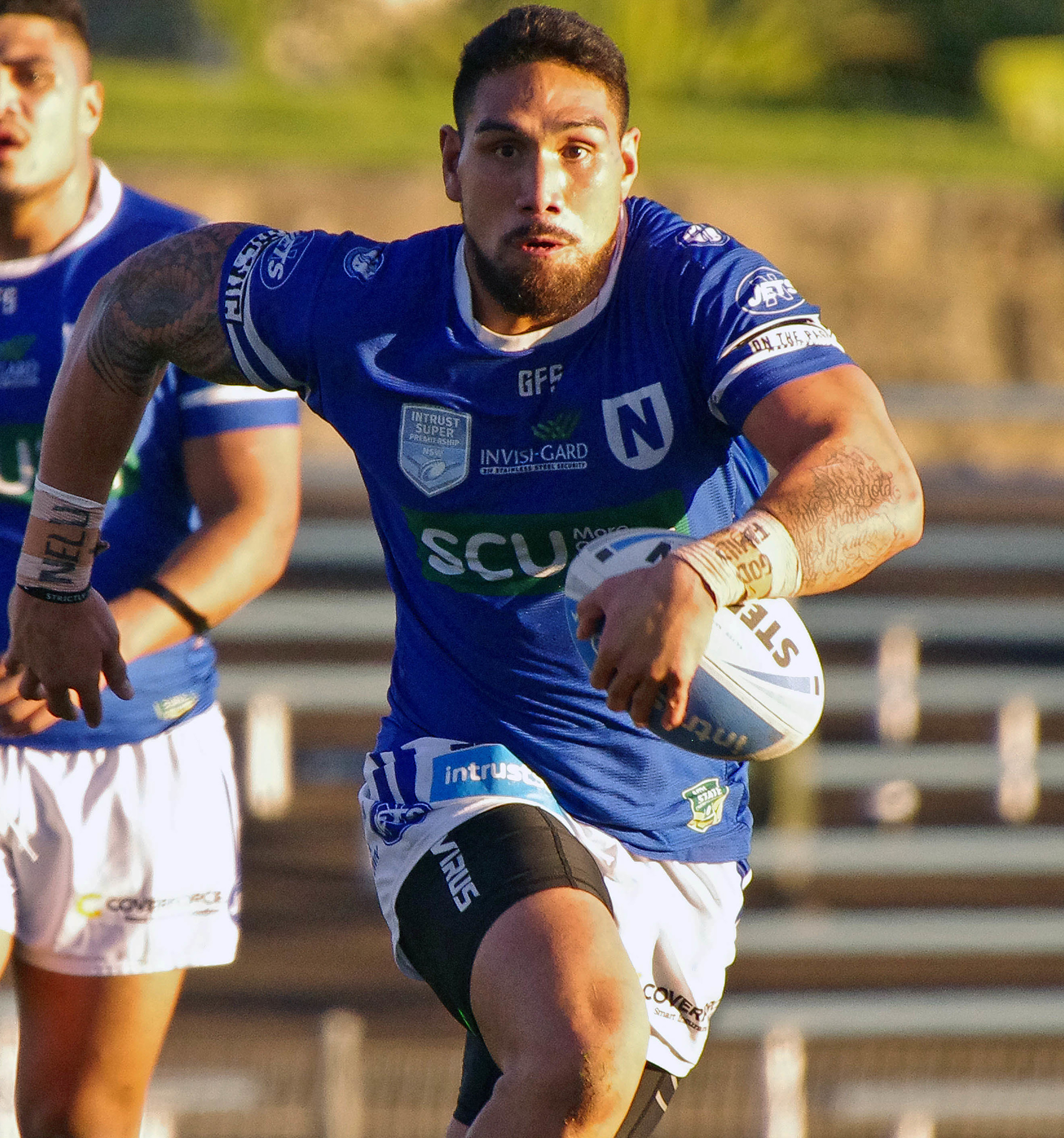

Personal information
- Full name: Jesse Sene-Lefao
- Born: 8 December 1989 (age 36) Wellington, New Zealand
- Height: 6 ft 2 in (1.89 m)
- Weight: 17 st 0 lb (108 kg)

Playing information
- Position: Second-row, Prop
Club
Years	Team	Pld	T	G	FG	P
2013–15	Manly Sea Eagles	38	3	0	0	12
2016	Cronulla Sharks	6	0	0	0	0
2017–21	Castleford Tigers	109	16	0	0	64
2022	Featherstone Rovers	16	7	0	0	28
2023–24	Sheffield Eagles	46	11	0	0	44
	Total	215	37	0	0	148
Representative
Years	Team	Pld	T	G	FG	P
2014	Samoa	2	0	0	0	0
- Source: As of 5 January 2023
- Relatives: Matthew Wright (cousin); Tim Simona (uncle)

Jesse Sene-Lefao (born 8 December 1989) is a Samoa international rugby league footballer who plays as a prop or second-row forward for the Sheffield Eagles in the RFL Championship.

Sene-Lefao has previously played for the Manly-Warringah Sea Eagles and the Cronulla-Sutherland Sharks in the NRL, plus Castleford Tigers in the Super League.

== Background ==
Sene-Lefao was born in Wellington, New Zealand.

== Early years ==
Sene-Lefao is the nephew of West Tigers centre Tim Simona, and cousin of North Queensland Cowboys centre Matthew Wright. Sene-Lefao is of Samoan descent.

Sene-Lefao played his junior football for the Penrith Brothers before being signed by the Penrith Panthers. Sene-Lefao played for the Panthers' NYC team in 2008 and 2009, scoring 15 tries in 38 games.

== Playing career ==
=== 2013 ===
In 2013, Sene-Lefao joined the Manly-Warringah Sea Eagles. He made his NRL debut in the opening round of the season against the Brisbane Broncos at Suncorp Stadium, playing off the interchange bench in Manly-Warringah's 22–14 win. Sene-Lefao played his 2nd and last match for the year in round 8.

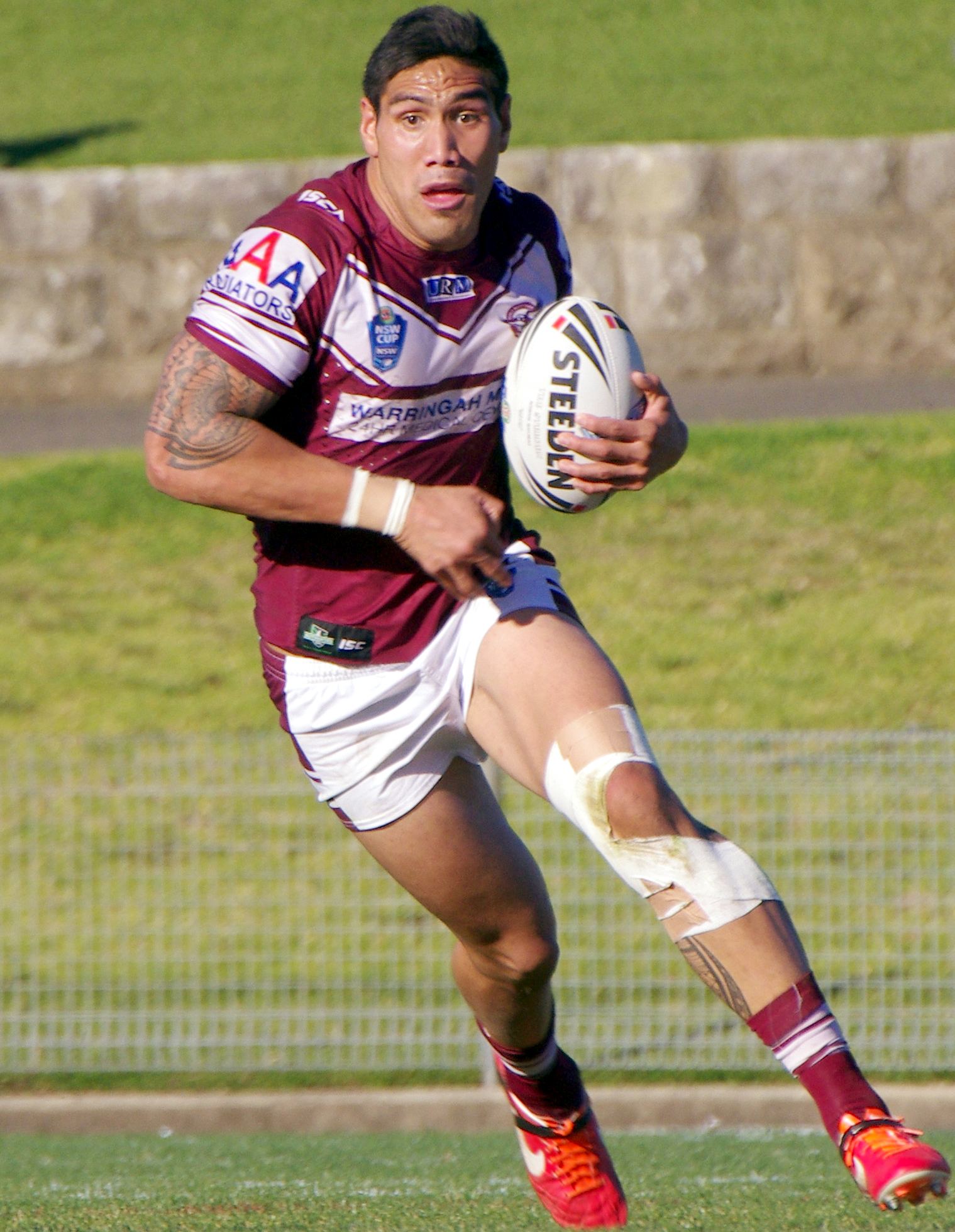
Sene-Lefao playing for the Manly Sea Eagles in 2013

Sene-Lefao spent most of the year playing for the team's New South Wales Cup team.

=== 2014 ===
Sene-Lefao was selected in Manly's inaugural 2014 NRL Auckland Nines squad. He made his international debut in May for Samoa in the test against Fiji at Penrith Stadium. Sene-Lefao played off the interchange bench in Samoa's 32–16 win. Soon after, Sene-Lefao re-signed with the Manly-Warringah club on a two-year contract.

In round 13 against the Canterbury-Bankstown Bulldogs at Brookvale Oval, Sene-Lefao scored his first NRL career try in Manly's 32–10 win. It was the sole try he scored from 25 matches in 2014. At the end of the season, Sene-Lefao was a late selection for Samoa in the Four Nations after Suaia Matagi was selected in the New Zealand national rugby league team squad.

=== 2015 ===
Sene-Lefao was again part of the Manly Auckland Nines squad in 2015. He scored two tries from his 11 matches in 2015. On 9 October, Sene-Lefao signed a two/year contract with the Cronulla-Sutherland Sharks, starting from 2016 after he was released from the final year of his contract with Manly.

=== 2016 ===
Sene-Lefao played 6 games for the Cronulla-Sutherland Sharks in 2016. He was a vital squad member for Cronulla-Sutherland in 2016, filling in for captain Paul Gallen during the semis, and the injured Sam Tagataese towards the end of the season. Although he did not play in Cronulla's 2016 drought breaking premiership win.

On 21 October 2016, Sene-Lefao signed a two-year contract with Castleford Tigers.

=== 2017 ===
Sene-Lefao played in the 2017 Super League Grand Final defeat by the Leeds Rhinos at Old Trafford.

=== 2018 ===
In the 2018 Super League season, he made 17 appearances for Castleford as the club finished third on the table but failed to reach the grand final.

=== 2019 ===
Sene-Lefao played 24 games for Castleford as they finished the Super League XXIV season in 5th place on the table. Castleford reached the second week of the 2019 Super League finals series where they were defeated by Salford 22-0 in the elimination semi-final.

=== 2020 ===
Sene-Lefao made nine appearances for Castleford in the 2020 Super League season. The club finished a disappointing ninth on the table, their lowest finish since 2013.

=== 2021 ===
On 17 July 2021, Sene-Lefao played for Castleford in their 2021 Challenge Cup Final loss against St. Helens.

=== 2022 ===
On 20 December 2021, it was reported that he had signed for Featherstone Rovers in the RFL Championship On 28 May, he played for Featherstone in their 2022 RFL 1895 Cup final loss against Leigh. On 31 October, he signed a two-year deal to join fellow RFL Championship side Sheffield ahead of the 2023 season.

== Statistics ==
Year	Team	Games	Tries	Pts
2013	Manly Warringah Sea Eagles	2		
2014	Manly Warringah Sea Eagles	25	1	4
2015	Manly Warringah Sea Eagles	11	2	8
2016	Cronulla-Sutherland Sharks	6		
2017	Castleford Tigers	34	6	24
2018	Castleford Tigers	22	2	8
2019	Castleford Tigers	25	7	28
2020	Castleford Tigers	9		
2021	Castleford Tigers	19	1	4
2022	Featherstone Rovers	16	7	28
2023	Sheffield Eagles	27	9	36
2024	Sheffield Eagles	17	2	8
	Totals	213	36	148
