= Matthew Wright (rugby league) =

Samoa international rugby league footballer

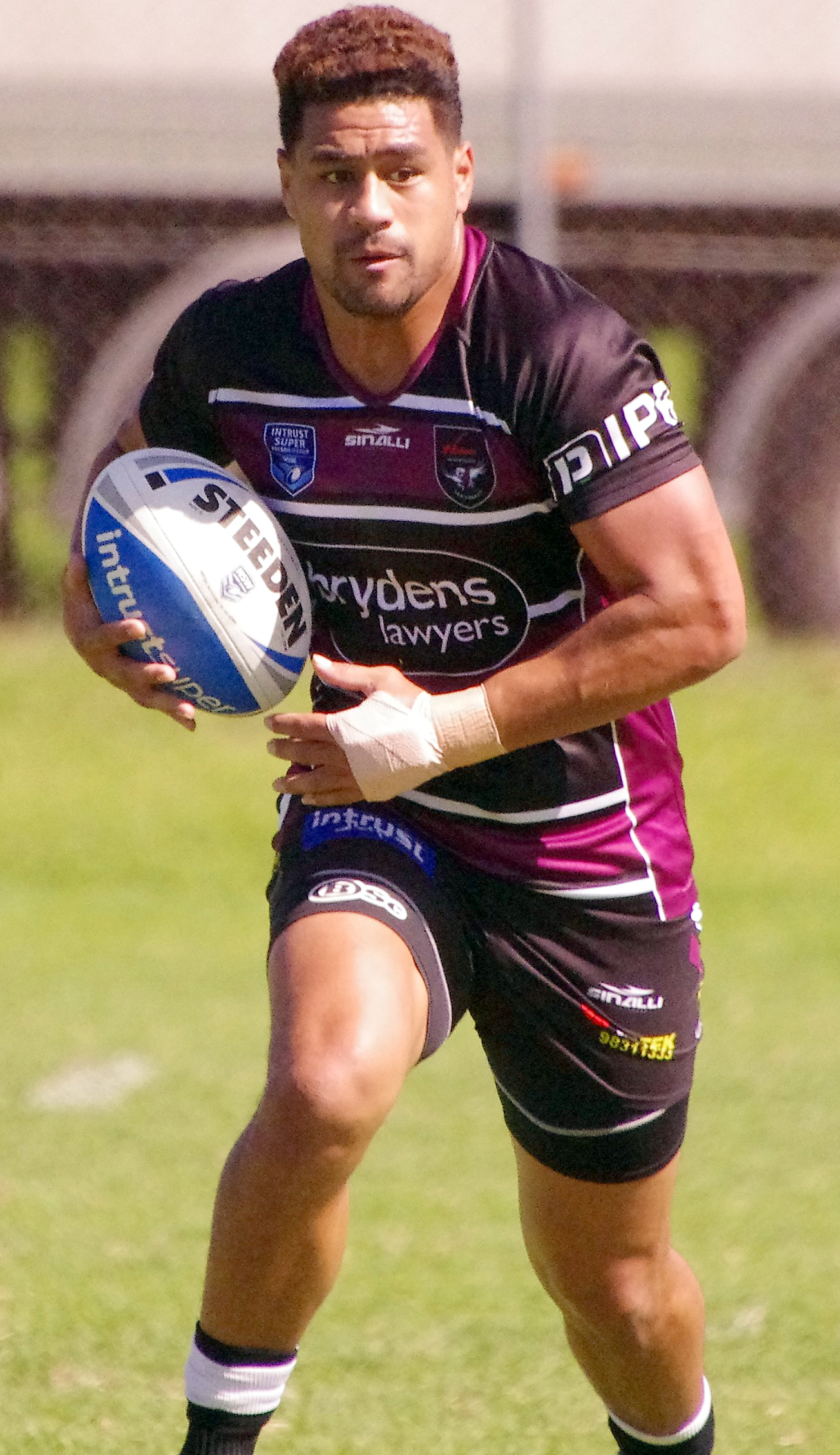

Personal information
- Born: 30 January 1991 (age 35) Auckland, New Zealand
- Height: 6 ft 4 in (1.92 m)
- Weight: 14 st 13 lb (95 kg)

Playing information
- Position: Wing, Fullback, Centre
Club
Years	Team	Pld	T	G	FG	P
2009–13	Cronulla Sharks	62	12	6	0	60
2014–15	Nth Qld Cowboys	34	18	0	0	72
2016–18	Manly Sea Eagles	47	12	43	0	134
2019–21	Newcastle Thunder	21	10	20	0	80
	Total	164	52	69	0	346
Representative
Years	Team	Pld	T	G	FG	P
2013–17	Samoa	5	2	4	0	16
2016–18	World All Stars	1	0	0	0	0
- Source: As of 29 December 2020
- Education: Patrician Brothers' College, Blacktown
- Relatives: Tony Tatupu (uncle); Tim Simona (uncle); Jesse Sene-Lefao (cousin); Lamar Liolevave (cousin)

Matthew Wright (born 30 January 1991) is a Samoa international rugby league footballer who plays as a centre, wing and fullback for the Townsville Blackhawks in Hostplus Cup.

He previously played for the Cronulla-Sutherland Sharks, North Queensland Cowboys and the Manly-Warringah Sea Eagles in the NRL and the Central Queensland Capras in the Intrust Super Cup.

== Early career ==
Born in Auckland, New Zealand, Wright grew up in Blacktown, New South Wales, playing his junior rugby league for St Patrick's and attending Patrician Brothers' College. While attending Patrician Brothers', Wright was a member of their rugby league team that was defeated by Matraville High in the final of 2007 GIO Schoolboy Cup. In 2008, Wright was selected to play for the Australian Schoolboys.

A Penrith Panthers junior, Wright played for the Panther's Harold Matthews Cup and S.G. Ball Cup sides, winning the Harold Matthews Player of the Year award in 2007. In 2008, Wright debuted for Penrith's NYC team. In 10 games, he scored six tries and kicked 28 goals. That year he signed a three-year deal with the Cronulla Sharks.

== Playing career ==
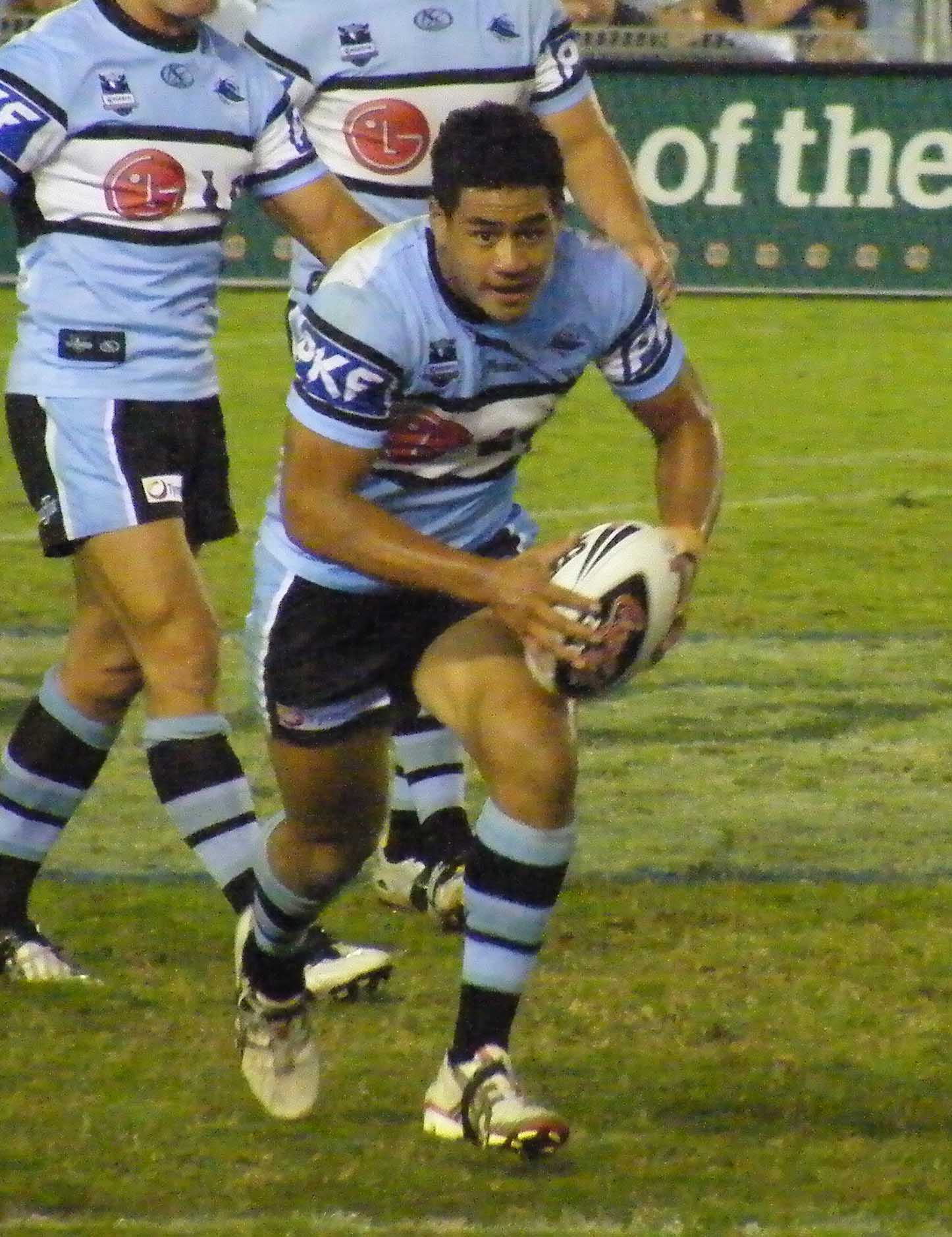
Wright playing for the Sharks in 2009

=== 2009 ===
After starting the 2009 season in the NYC, Wright made his first grade debut for the Sharks at just 18 years old. In his rookie season, Wright played 17 games and scored 6 tries.

=== 2010 ===
Wright spent the 2010 season playing for Cronulla's NYC and NSW Cup sides. At the end of the season, Wright played two games for the Junior Kangaroos, and was selected in Samoa's train-on squad.

=== 2011 ===
In 2011, Wright returned to first grade for the Sharks, playing 19 games all on the wing and scoring 4 tries.

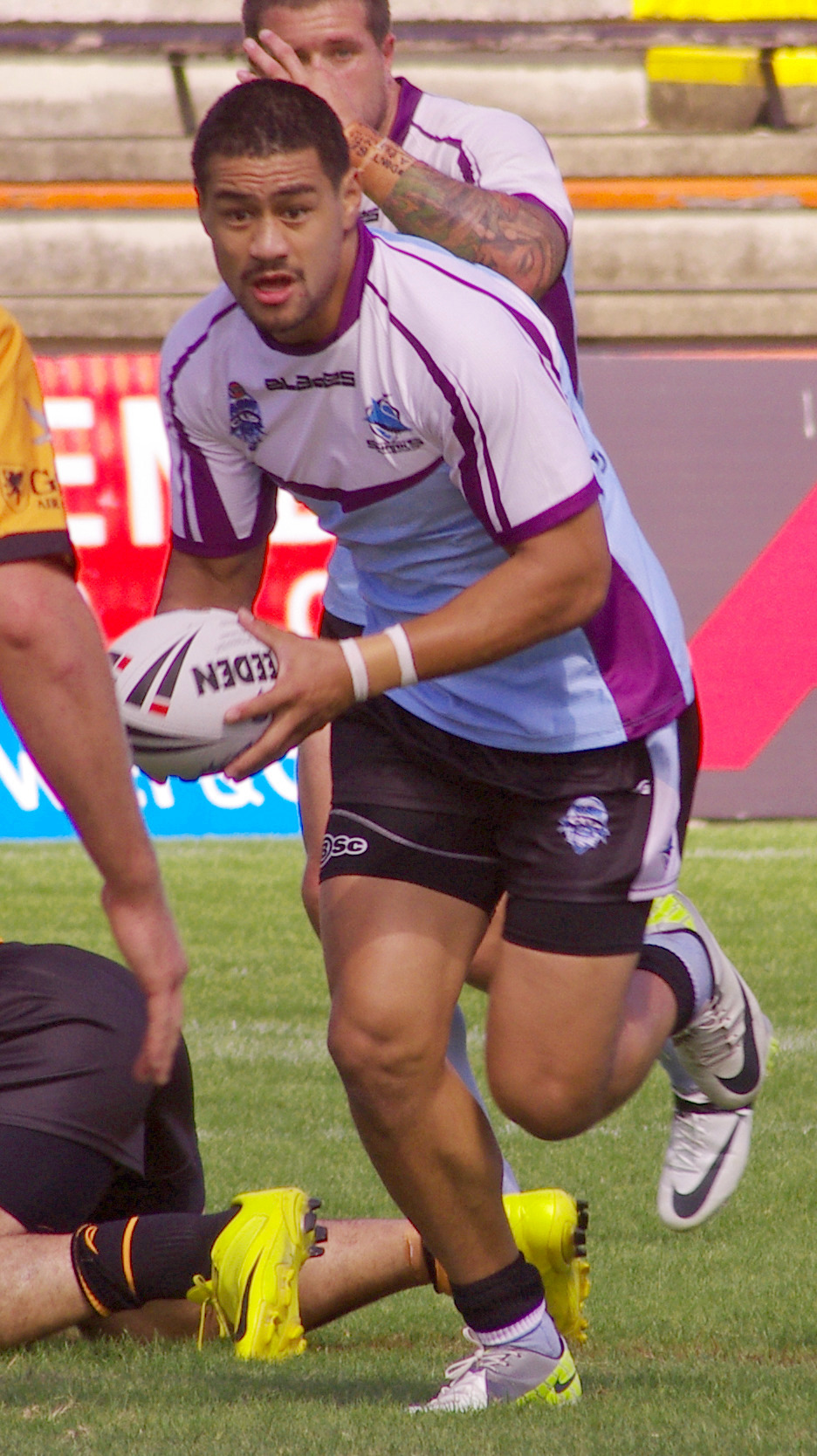
Wright playing for the Sharks-Storm team in the NSW Cup in 2012

=== 2012 ===
Wright spent the majority of 2012 playing fullback for Cronulla, scoring 1 try.

=== 2013 ===
In 2013, he made his test debut for Samoa in the Pacific Rugby League International against Tonga.

Later that season, Wright was a member of the Sharks victorious New South Wales Cup side.

=== 2014 ===
In January 2014, Wright signed a one-year deal with the North Queensland Cowboys. Wright made his debut for the Cowboys in their Round 5 win over the Newcastle Knights, in which he scored a try. On 22 August, Wright became one of the current NRL players and former Sharks players to accept reduced bans from the Australian Sports Anti-Doping Authority for his role in the club's 2011 supplements program.

Wright finished his first season for the Cowboys with 9 tries in 17 games, including a first half hat-trick in the side's 64–6 win over the Wests Tigers.

=== 2015 ===
In Round 5 of the 2015 NRL season, Wright scored his second hat-trick for the Cowboys in their 30–10 win over the Penrith Panthers.

=== 2016 ===
On 22 April, Wright was granted a release from the Cowboys to join the Manly Warringah Sea Eagles on a three-year contract. On 7 May 2016, Wright played for Samoa in the 2016 Polynesian Cup against Tonga, where he played on the wing and scored a try in the 18–6 win at Parramatta Stadium. Later in the year he represented Samoa in their historical test match against Fiji in Apia. He kicked 3 goals in Samoa's two point defeat.

=== 2019 ===
On 9 Jun 2019, Newcastle Thunder announced the signing of Wright

== Statistics ==
=== NRL ===
Statistics are correct the end of the 2021 season

Season	Team	Matches	T	G	F/G	Pts
2009	Cronulla-Sutherland Sharks	17	6	0	0	24
2011	Cronulla-Sutherland Sharks	19	4	6	0	28
2012	Cronulla-Sutherland Sharks	21	1	0	0	4
2013	Cronulla-Sutherland Sharks	5	1	0	0	4
2014	North Queensland Cowboys	17	9	0	0	36
2015	North Queensland Cowboys	17	9	0	0	36
2016	Manly Warringah Sea Eagles	15	2	7	0	22
2017	Manly Warringah Sea Eagles	15	6	36	0	96
2018	Manly Warringah Sea Eagles	17	4			16
2019	Newcastle Thunder	6	7	12		52
2020	Newcastle Thunder	1				
2021	Newcastle Thunder	14	3	8		28
Career totals		182	62	49	0	266

=== International ===
Season	Team	Matches	T	G	GK %	F/G	Pts
2013	Samoa	1	0	0	—	0	0
2016	Samoa	2	1	3	100.00	0	10
2017	Samoa	2	1	1			6
Career totals		5	2	4	100.00	0	16

== Personal life ==
Wright is the nephew of former New Zealand international Tony Tatupu and Wests Tigers back Tim Simona (despite actually being almost 10 months older than Simona). He is also a cousin of Cronulla-Sutherland Sharks forward Jesse Sene-Lefao and Canterbury-Bankstown Bulldogs forward Lamar Liolevave.
