= Tim Simona =

Samoa international rugby league footballer

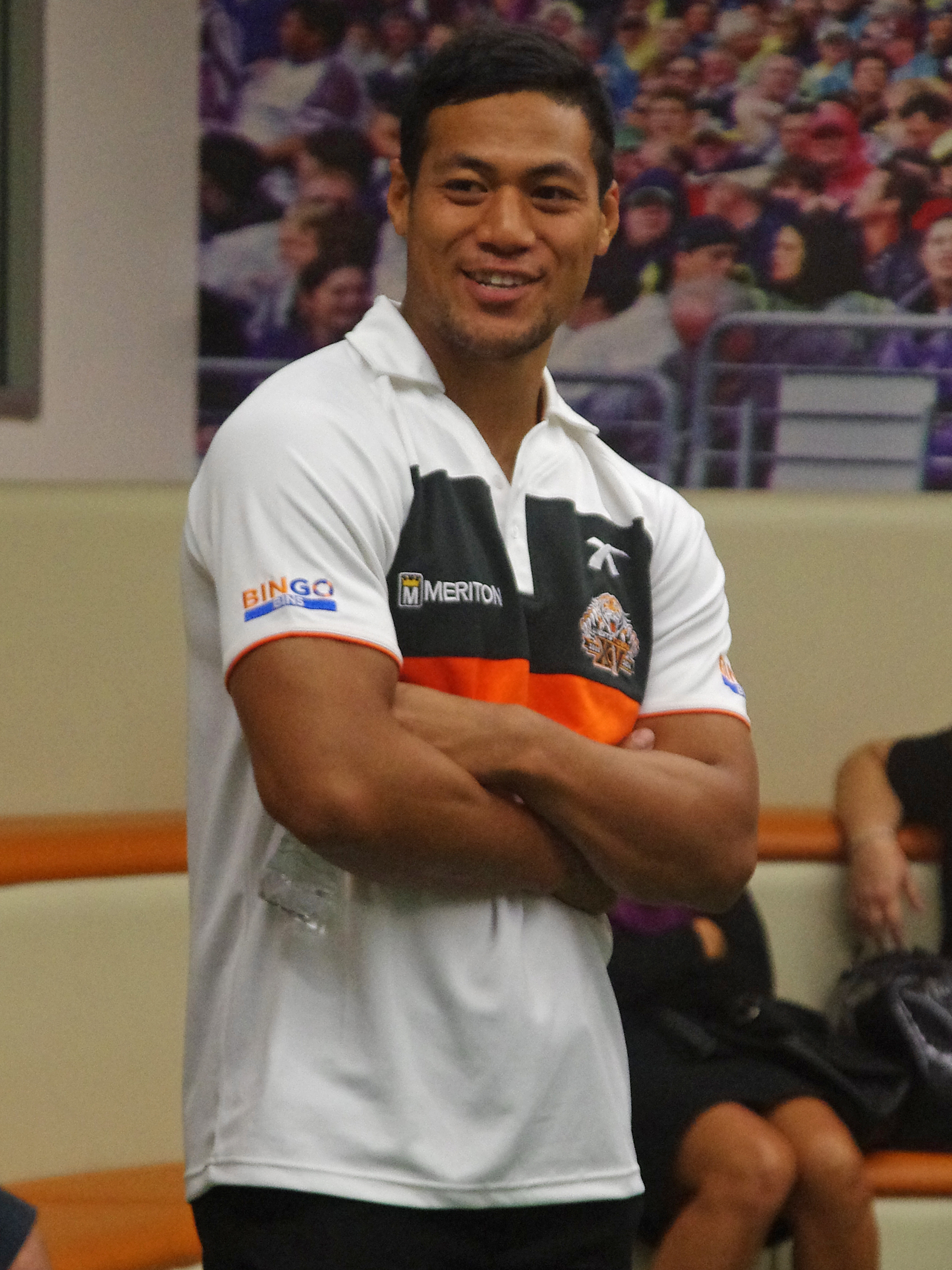

Personal information
- Full name: Timothy Simona
- Born: 20 November 1991 (age 35) Auckland, New Zealand
- Height: 183 cm (6 ft 0 in)
- Weight: 90 kg (14 st 2 lb)

Playing information
- Position: Centre, Fullback
Club
Years	Team	Pld	T	G	FG	P
2011–16	Wests Tigers	79	27	1	0	110
Representative
Years	Team	Pld	T	G	FG	P
2014–16	Samoa	5	1	1	0	6
- Source: As of 2 August 2016
- Education: Chifley College Mount Druitt Campus; Patrician Brothers' College, Blacktown
- Relatives: Jesse Sene-Lefao (nephew); Matthew Wright (nephew); Sami Sauiluma (cousin); Michael Chee-Kam

Tim Simona (born 20 November 1991) is a former Samoan international rugby league footballer who last played as a centre, fullback, wing and halfback for the Blacktown Workers Sea Eagles in the NSW Cup and previously Wests Tigers in the NRL.

== Early years ==
Born in Auckland, New Zealand, Simona is of Samoan descent. Simona moved to Australia as a 6-year old. and was a Western City Tigers and Doonside Roos junior. Simona was educated at Chifley College Mount Druitt Campus and Patrician Brothers' College, Blacktown. Simona played for the Wests Tigers NYC team in 2010-2011.

== Playing career ==
=== 2011 ===
Simona joined the Wests Tigers first grade squad in 2011. In Round 13, he made an "impressive NRL debut" against the Newcastle Knights at centre in the Tigers 17-16 win at Leichhardt Oval.

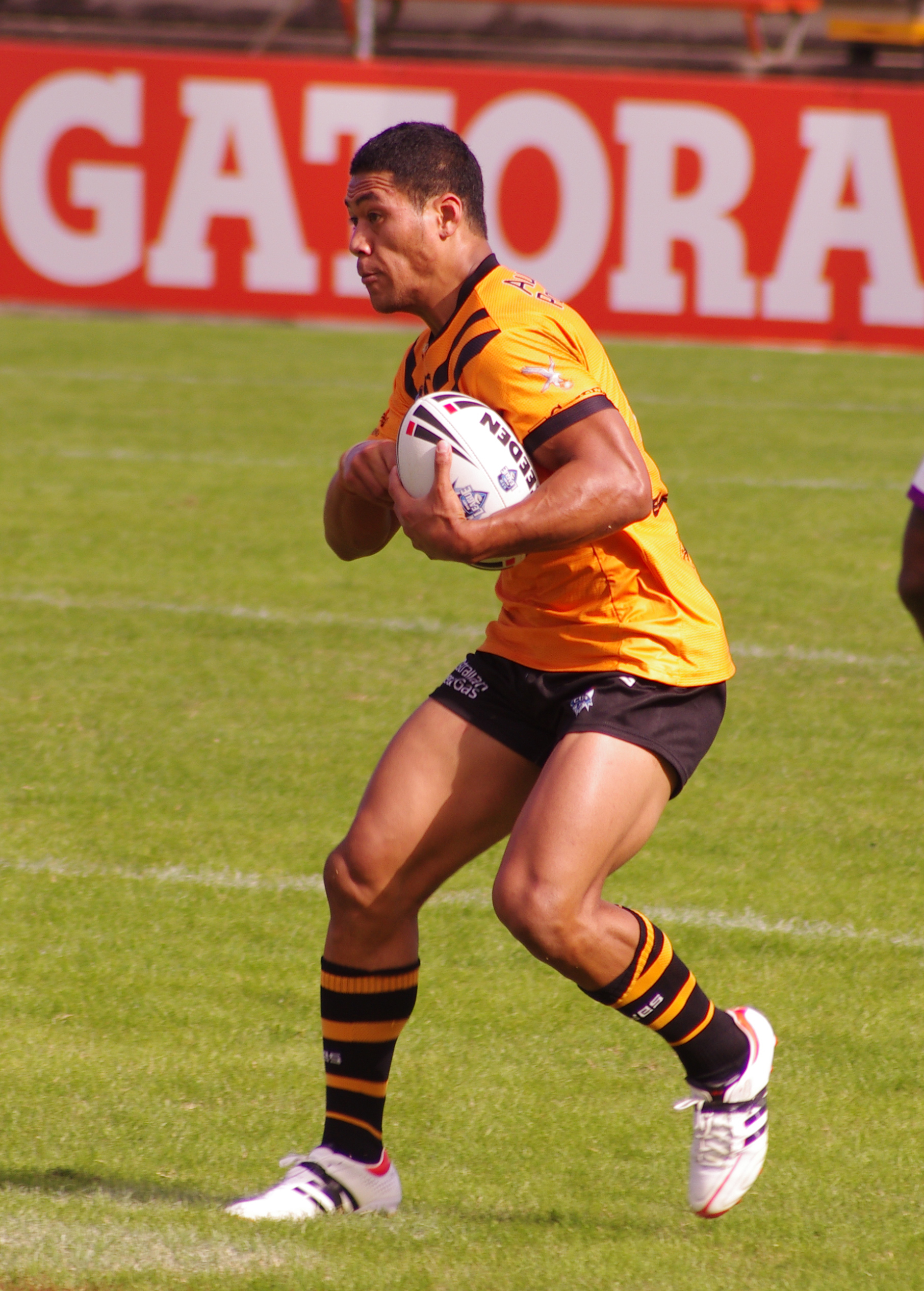
Simona playing for the Wests Tigers

=== 2012 ===
Simona played 3 first-grade games in 2012. He was a member of the Balmain Ryde Eastwood Tigers side that lost the NSW Cup grand final the Newtown Jets.

=== 2013 ===
Starting the season in NSW Cup, Simona returned to first grade in Round 8 after injuries to Blake Ayshford and Chris Lawrence and spent the rest of the season playing either wing or centre. In Round 13 Simona scored his first NRL career try against the Penrith Panthers in the Tigers 20-18 win at Penrith Stadium. On 18 July, he re-signed with the Tigers to the end of 2015. Simona finished the year as the Tigers highest try-scorer with 12 tries in 17 matches. At the end of the season, Simona underwent an operation on his shoulder that was expected to see him out of action for some months. Simona had been selected for New Zealand's 2013 World Cup side, but declined in order to better prepared for the 2014 season.

=== 2014 ===
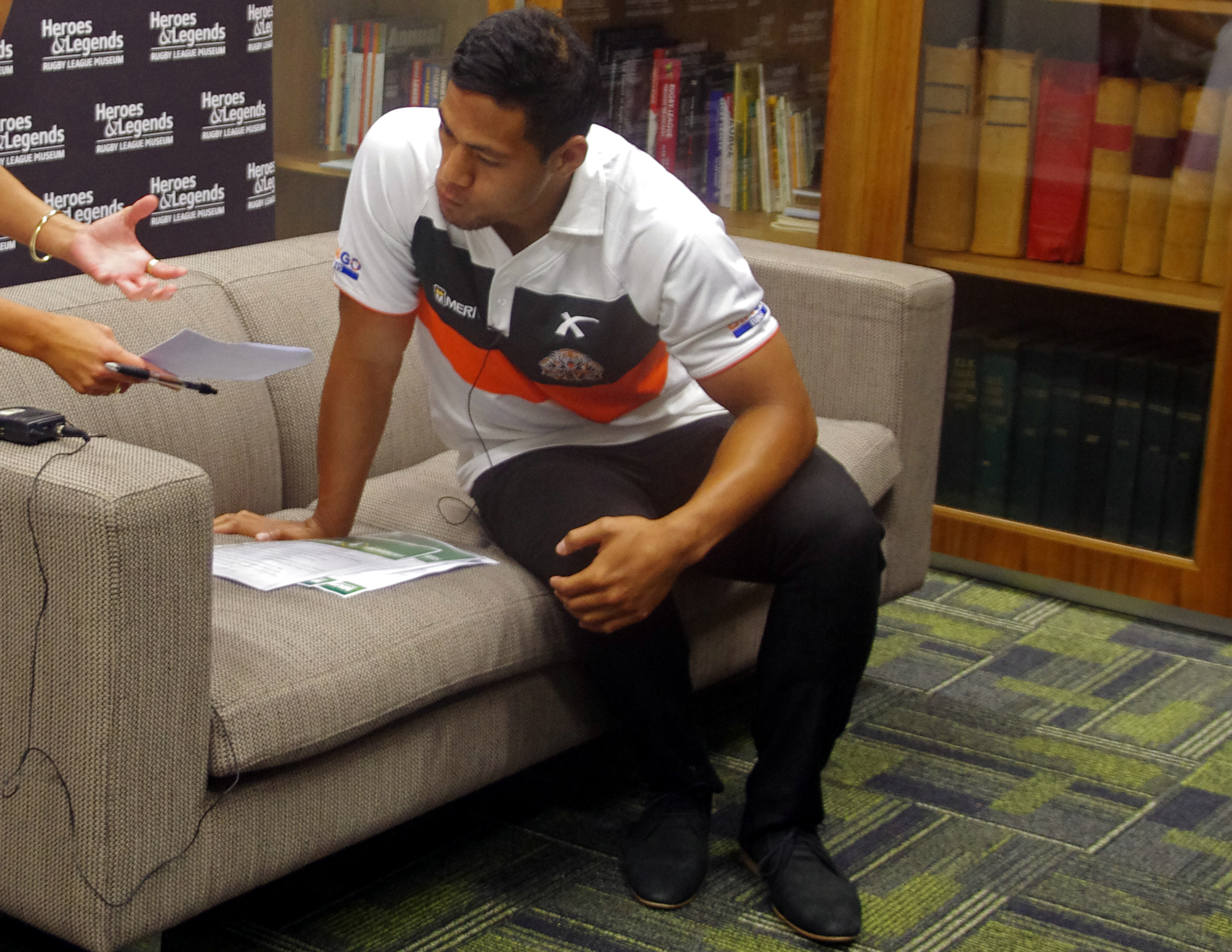
Simona on media duty for the Wests Tigers

In April, Simona was named for Samoa against Fiji in the Pacific Rugby League International match, a qualifier for the 2014 Four Nations, but was later ruled out with suspension and replaced by St George Illawarra Dragons player Peter Mata'utia. Simona finished off the year with him playing in 14 matches and scoring 3 tries. On 25 October, Simona made his international debut for Samoa against England at Suncorp Stadium, playing at fullback in Samoa's 32-26 loss. He played in 3 matches and scored 1 try throughout the Four Nations.

=== 2015 ===
On 23 January, Simona was named in the Tigers Auckland Nines squad. He started the regular season by scoring 3 tries and setting up 6 more in the first 7 rounds. In May, he played at halfback for Samoa against Tonga in the 2015 Polynesian Cup, and suffered an ankle injury during the match. He ended the season with 5 tries and 10 try-assists from a personal-best 20 appearances.

=== 2016 ===
Simona again started the pre-season playing in the Auckland Nines. On 7 May, Simona played fullback for Samoa in the 2016 Polynesian Cup, winning 18-6. He made a career-best 21 appearances for Wests Tigers, scoring 7 tries, but admitted to being disappointed with his form. "I spoke one-on-one with my coach, and he told me that I'd had a pretty good year, but I just know for myself as a player that I've got plenty more to prove," he said.

=== 2017 ===
Simona was officially de-registered by the NRL on 10 March, after the NRL integrity unit found that he had breached the rules of the league by betting on NRL games. NRL CEO Todd Greenberg declared: "it is very hard to imagine that Tim Simona will be registered with the NRL at any time in the future". On 11 July 2017, Simona was given an 18 month good behaviour bond by Campbelltown local court. Simona was facing up to two years in jail for his role in selling signed jerseys for auction but taking the proceeds for himself which he then used for gambling and drug use purposes. On 4 December 2017, it was revealed that Simona was attempting to resurrect his career in England with Hull Kingston Rovers, and The Toronto Wolfpack showing interest in signing the player. But both clubs were told Simona's contract could not be registered as he failed to meet the eligibility requirements.

=== 2018 ===
In June, Penrith general manager Phil Gould formally approached the NRL about the player getting clearance to be a welfare officer in the NRL community outreach program. Gould spoke to the media saying "Regardless of any future opportunity to return to the NRL, Tim is doing his best to make up for his mistakes of the past". Former teammate Beau Ryan said to the media "People have got very short memories which is good and bad. I believe at some stage he does need a second chance. Whether that's playing? Probably not, to be honest, I can't see him playing on the field again".

=== 2019 ===
On 13 January, it was reported that Simona was preparing a formal bid to overturn his indefinite ban from the game. It was revealed that Simona was preparing to meet with the Rugby League Players Association. On July 4, the NRL approved his application to return to the game, for Blacktown, the feeder club for the Manly-Warringah Sea-Eagles On 13 July, Simona returned to the field for the first time in over 2 years as Blacktown defeated South Sydney 30-22 at ANZ Stadium in the Canterbury Cup NSW competition.

He signed with French Elite One Championship club Lézignan Sangliers for the 2019-2020 season.

== Personal life ==
Simona is the cousin of winger Sami Sauiluma also first cousins with Michael Chee-Kam and uncle of Castleford Tigers forward Jesse Sene-Lefao and Manly Warringah Sea Eagles winger Matthew Wright. Simona's younger brother Paul Simona played for the Cronulla-Sutherland Sharks Toyota Cup. He is eligible to play for either Samoa through his heritage, New Zealand due to being born there, or Australia as a result of playing junior footy in that country. After his rugby league career was finished, Simona started working as a personal trainer at a gym in Smeaton Grange.

In December 2017, Simona announced that he would be pursuing a career in Boxing after failing to get another rugby league contract. On 8 February 2018, Simona was scheduled to fight in a boxing match at The Hurstville Entertainment Center but was pulled from the card in the week leading up to the event because he failed to get clearance from the combat sports authority.

On 1 September 2019, it was revealed that Simona had forced his then girlfriend of four months to have an abortion after she discovered she was pregnant. The alleged incident occurred back in 2016 when Simona was playing for the Wests Tigers. The woman told the media "Straightaway he said, ‘We're definitely going to get an abortion’, I was in shock, it was one of those moments where you can't quite believe what you're hearing and can't quite process it then and there … He was so cold. That was the absolute beginning point, so from then he wouldn't speak to me unless we were talking about me getting an abortion". The woman went on to say "He refused to talk about the possibility of having the baby and manipulated me by saying things like, ‘How could you do this to me? How could you bring a baby into the world whose father didn't want it? How could you ruin my career like that? You're doing this on purpose".
