= Sami Sauiluma =

Australian rugby league footballer

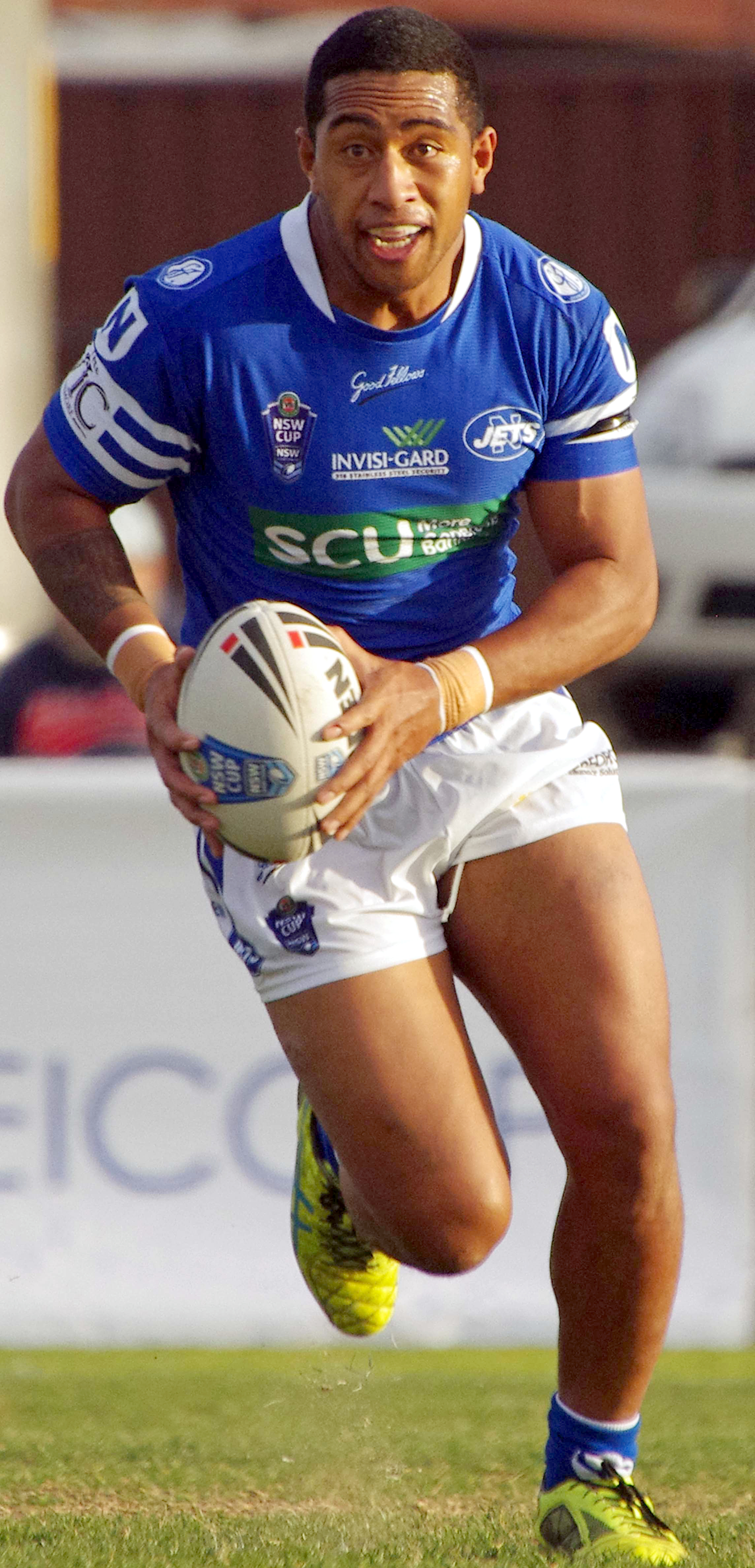

Personal information
- Born: 14 February 1991 (age 35) Bankstown, New South Wales, Australia
- Height: 184 cm (6 ft 0 in)
- Weight: 104 kg (16 st 5 lb)

Playing information
- Position: Centre, Wing, Second-row
Club
Years	Team	Pld	T	G	FG	P
2013–14	Canberra Raiders	15	5	0	0	20
2015	Cronulla-Sutherland	3	0	0	0	0
	Total	18	5	0	0	20
Representative
Years	Team	Pld	T	G	FG	P
2016	Queensland Residents	1	0	0	0	0
- Source: As of 6 January 2024
- Relatives: Tim Simona (cousin)

Sami Sauiluma (born 14 February 1993) is an Australian professional rugby league footballer who plays for the Burleigh Bears in the Queensland Cup. He primarily plays at centre and wing, but can also fill in at second-row and previously played for the Canberra Raiders and Cronulla-Sutherland Sharks in the NRL.

== Background ==
Born in Bankstown, New South Wales, Sauiluma is of Samoan descent and played his junior rugby league for the Woden Valley Rams, before being signed by the Canberra Raiders.

Sauiluma is a cousin of Wests Tigers player Tim Simona.

== Playing career ==
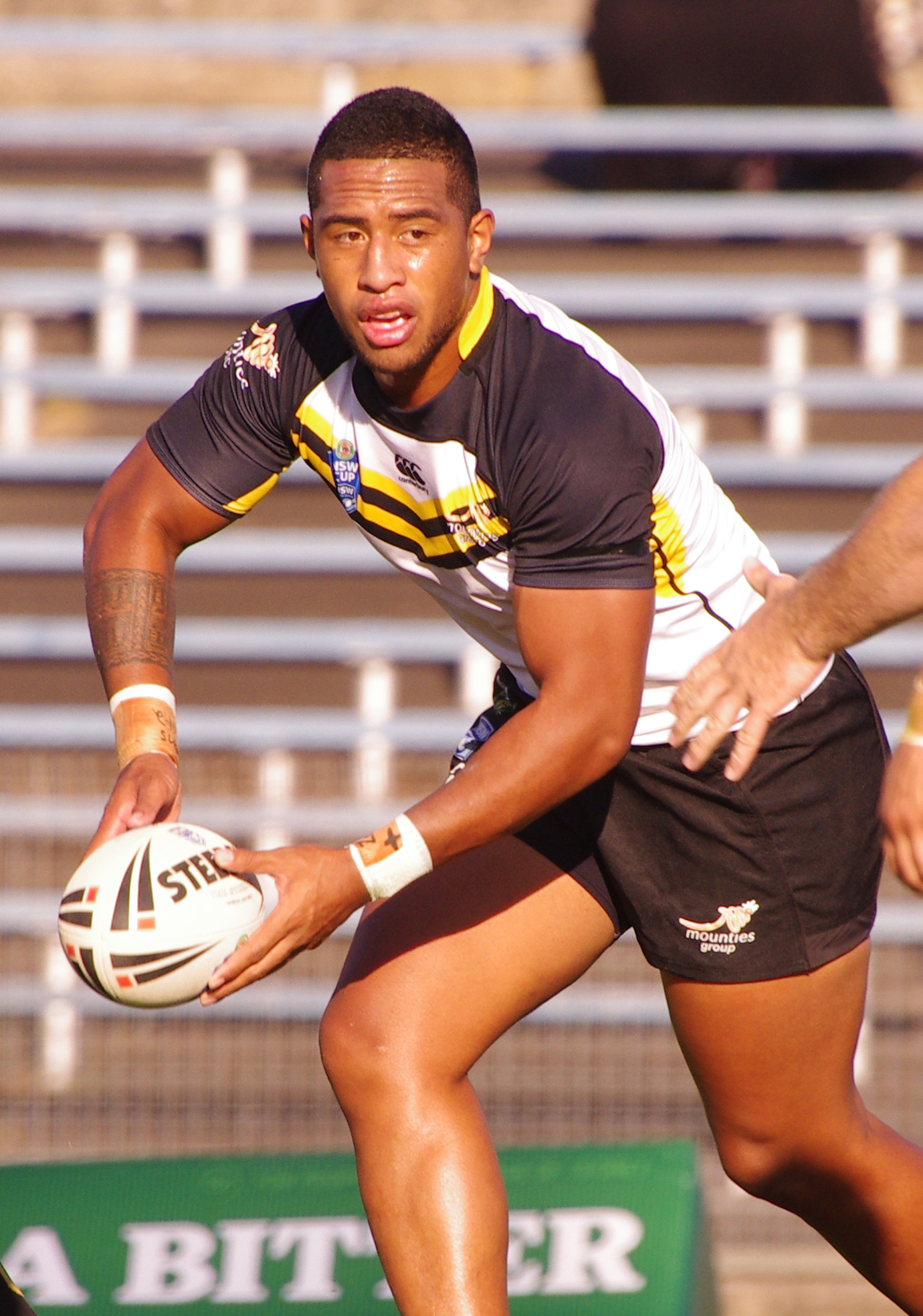
Sauiluma playing for the Mount Pritchard Mounties in 2013

=== Early career ===
From 2009 to 2011, Sauiluma played for the Canberra Raiders' NYC team, before moving on to the Raiders' NSW Cup team, Mount Pritchard Mounties in 2012.

=== 2013 ===
In Round 15 of the 2013 NRL season, Sauiluma made his NRL debut for the Canberra Raiders against the Wests Tigers. On 19 September, he was named in the Samoan train-on squad for the 2013 Rugby League World Cup, but didn't make the final cut.

=== 2014 ===
On 21 September, Sauiluma was named at centre in the 2014 New South Wales Cup Team of the Year. On 25 September, he signed a 1-year contract with the Cronulla-Sutherland Sharks starting in 2015.

=== 2015 ===
In round 9 of the 2015 NRL season, Sauiluma made his Cronulla-Sutherland debut against the New Zealand Warriors. On 27 September, he was named at centre in the 2015 New South Wales Cup Team of the Year, for a second year in a row. At the conclusion of the 2015 season, he was released by Cronulla-Sutherland. In November, he joined the Gold Coast Titans to train in the 2016 pre-season and attempt to gain a contract but this proved unsuccessful.

=== 2016 to 2023 ===
In 2016, Sauiluma joined Queensland Cup side Burleigh. He played in the clubs 2016 and 2019 Queensland Cup grand final victories. He made his 100th appearance for Burleigh during the 2021 season.
