= Penani Manumalealii =

Samoa international rugby league footballer

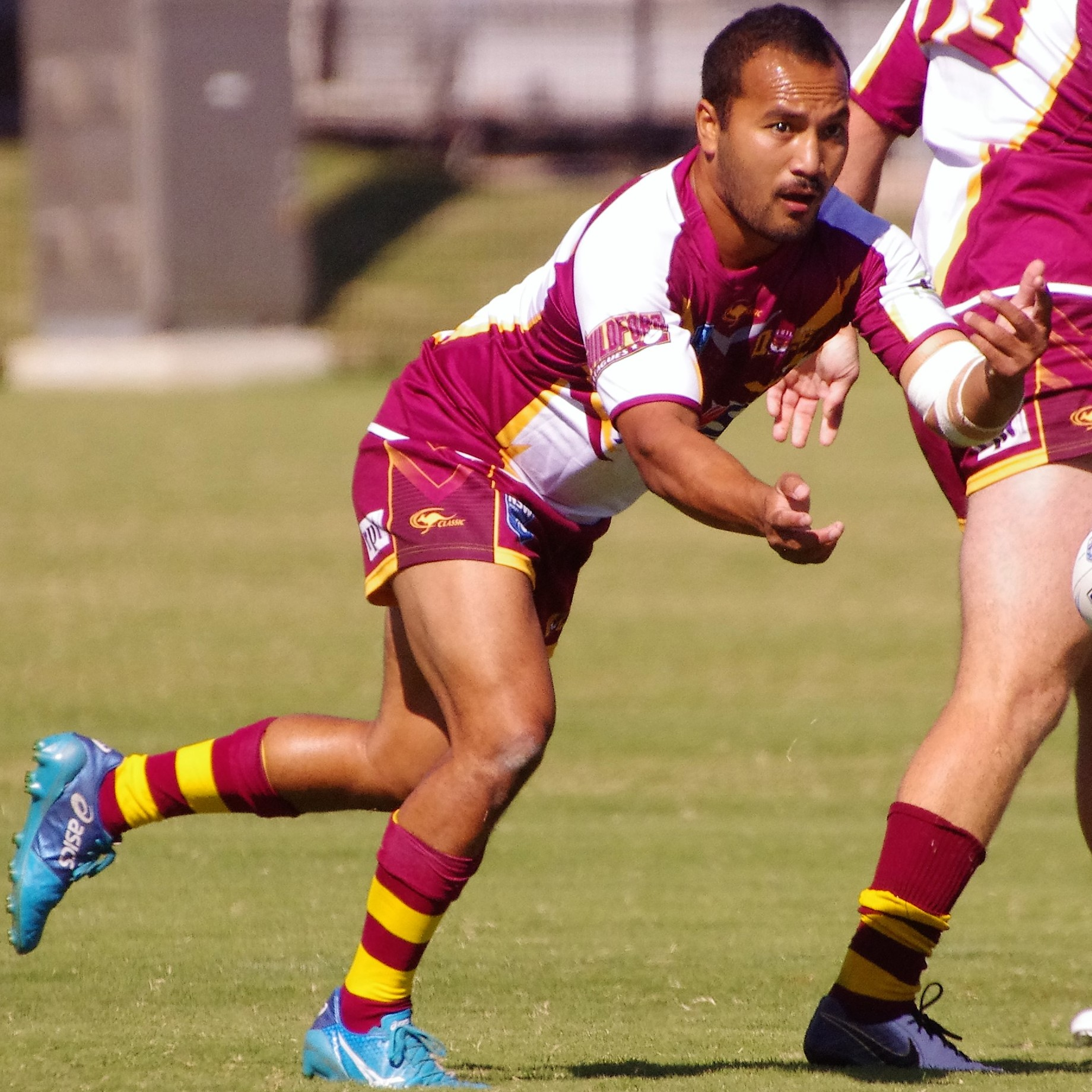

Personal information
- Born: 14 June 1992 (age 33) Apia, Samoa
- Height: 170 cm (5 ft 7 in)
- Weight: 80 kg (12 st 8 lb)

Playing information
- Position: Halfback, Five-eighth, Hooker
Club
Years	Team	Pld	T	G	FG	P
2014	Cronulla Sharks	2	0	0	0	0
Representative
Years	Team	Pld	T	G	FG	P
2013–14	Samoa	4	4	0	0	16
- Source: As of 12 May 2019

Penani Manumalealii (born 14 June 1992) is a Samoan professional rugby league footballer who plays as a halfback and five-eighth for the Newtown Jets in the Intrust Super Premiership NSW, having previously played for the Cronulla-Sutherland Sharks and the Wests Tigers in the NRL.

== Early years ==
Born in Apia, Samoa, Manumalealii was raised in New Zealand and attended Hornby high school while playing his junior football for the Hornby Panthers.

== Playing career ==
As a 16-year-old, Manumalealii moved to Sydney, Australia to play for the Cronulla-Sutherland Sharks. He played for the Sharks' NYC team from 2010 to 2012 before moving on to the Sharks' New South Wales Cup team in 2013.

In Round 2 of the 2014 NRL season, Manumalealii made his NRL debut for the Sharks against the Canterbury-Bankstown Bulldogs.

On 20 March 2014, Manumalealii signed a contract with the Wests Tigers effective immediately for the rest of the season.

At the end of the 2016 season, Manumalealii was not re-signed by the Wests Tigers, instead signing with the Newtown Jets.

== Representative career ==
In 2012, Manumalealii played for the Junior Kiwis.

In 2013, Manumalealii was named in the Samoa squad for the World Cup. He scored a try in their opening match against New Zealand.

In May 2014, Penani played for Samoa in the 2014 Pacific Rugby League International. He scored three tries in Samoa's 32-16 victory. He dedicated those tries to his mother who had died months earlier.

On 8 September 2014, Manumalealii was selected for the Samoa Four Nations train-on squad. On 7 October 2014, Manumalealii was selected in the Samoa national rugby league team final 24 man squad for the 2014 Four Nations series.
