= Sam Tagataese =

Samoa international rugby league footballer

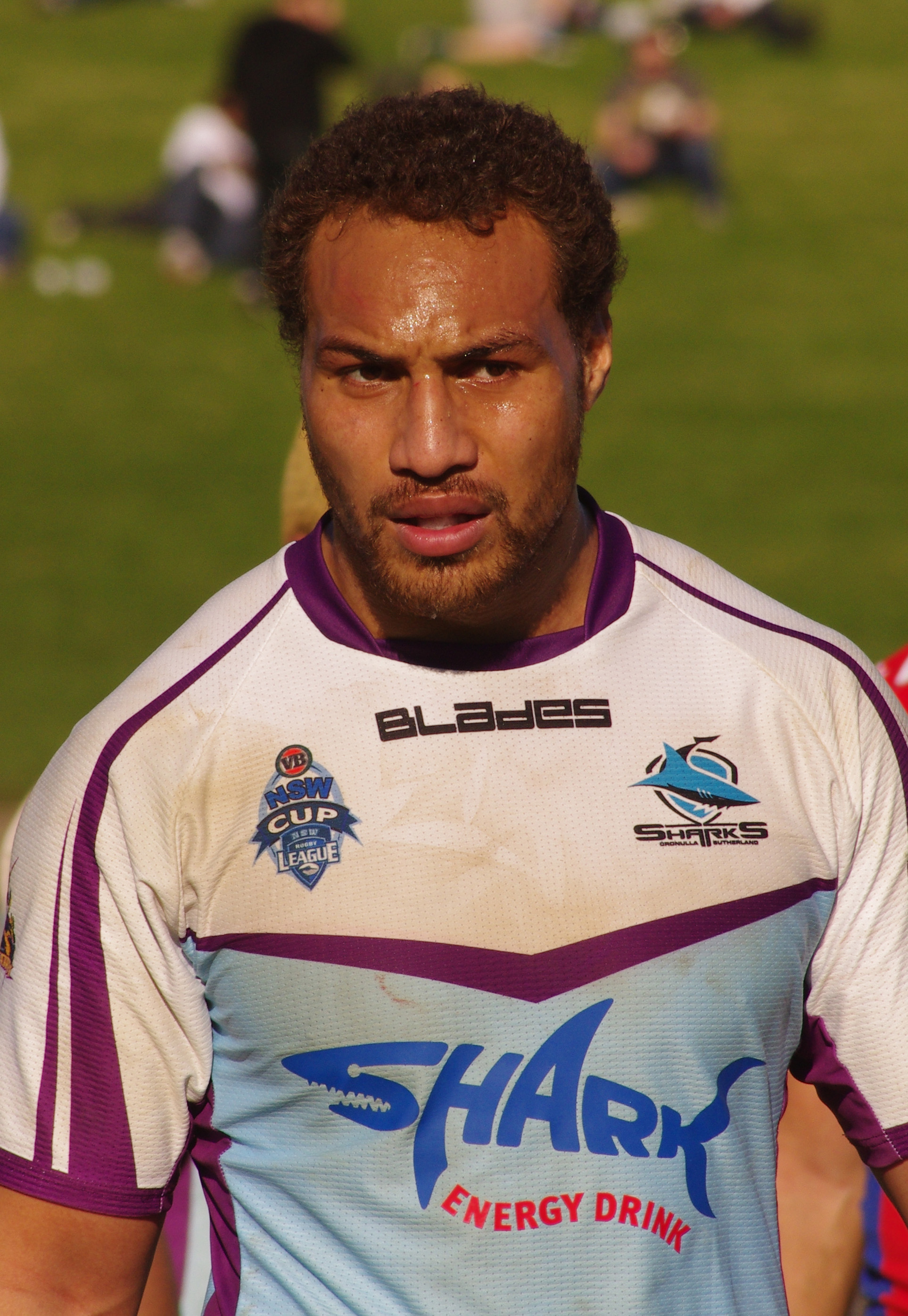

Personal information
- Full name: Samuel Tagataese
- Born: 8 December 1986 (age 39) Wellington, New Zealand
- Height: 193 cm (6 ft 4 in)
- Weight: 108 kg (17 st 0 lb)

Playing information
- Position: Prop, Second-row, Centre
Club
Years	Team	Pld	T	G	FG	P
2007–08	Melbourne Storm	19	2	0	0	8
2009–11	Gold Coast Titans	33	4	0	0	16
2011–17	Cronulla Sharks	118	9	0	0	36
2018	Brisbane Broncos	4	0	0	0	0
	Total	174	15	0	0	60
Representative
Years	Team	Pld	T	G	FG	P
2009–17	Samoa	6	0	0	0	0
- Source: As of 14 March 2021

Sam Tagataese pronounced (/teɪɡətiːzi/) (born 8 December 1986) is a Samoa international rugby league footballer who last played as a prop forward for the Brisbane Broncos in the NRL.

He played for the Melbourne Storm, Gold Coast Titans and the Cronulla-Sutherland Sharks in the National Rugby League. Tagataese was part of the Cronulla team that won their maiden premiership title in the 2016 season.

== Early life ==
Born in Wellington, New Zealand. Tagataese attended St. Bernard's College, Lower Hutt, playing first fifteen Rugby, and received Sportsman of the year in 2003.

He left Wellington to play with Melbourne Storm feeder Brisbane Norths. He was educated at Wavell State High School was selected for the Queensland under 19's and 2004 Junior Kiwis squad.

== Playing career ==
Tagataese made his NRL debut for the Melbourne Storm on 7 April 2007, against the Newcastle Knights at Energy Australia Stadium. He made 11 appearances for Melbourne in his debut year. In the 2008 NRL season, Tagatese played 6 games for Melbourne before he joined the Gold Coast. Tagatese played in the Gold Coast's first ever finals campaign in the 2009 NRL season.

On 11 June 2011, Tagataese announced he was leaving the Gold Coast Titans immediately to join the Cronulla-Sutherland Sharks on a three-year contract. Tagataese managed eight appearances for the Gold Coast in the 2011 NRL season as the club finished last and claimed the wooden spoon.

In the 2014 NRL season, Tagataese played 18 games as Cronulla-Sutherland endured a horror year on and off the field with the club finishing last on the table due to a high injury toll and the Cronulla-Sutherland Sharks supplements saga.

In the 2015 NRL season, Cronulla turned their form around on the field to reach the finals. Tagataese played in the club's 39–0 defeat by North Queensland in the elimination final.

In 2016, Tagataese was part of the Cronulla side which won their first ever premiership defeating Melbourne 14–12 in the 2016 NRL Grand Final at ANZ Stadium.

On 13 December 2017, Brisbane Broncos announced they had signed Tagataese on a one-year deal."For me it is about tapping into something I don't think I have tapped into before- and that is getting the best out of myself," he said. "I am going to give it my all and I hope to make it into the 17 during the year."

In 2019, he announced his retirement, playing his final game for the Souths Logan Magpies of the Queensland Cup. He scored ten tries for the Magpies during his stint in the Queensland Cup.

== Representative career ==
Tagataese is of Samoan heritage, and was named in the Samoa training squad for the 2008 Rugby League World Cup.

In 2009 he was named as part of the Samoan side for the Pacific Cup.

In 2013, Sam made his international début, he played for Samoa in the Pacific Rugby League International against fierce pacific rivals Tonga.

In May 2014, Sam again played for Samoa in the Pacific Rugby League International. Tagataese made headlines in the match after being sent off for a head-butt on Fijian player Kane Evans.

On 8 September 2014, Tagataese was selected for the Samoa Four Nations train-on squad. On 7 October 2014, Tagataese was selected in the Samoa national rugby league team final 24 man squad for the 2014 Four Nations series.

On 7 May 2016, Tagataese traveled down from Hull to Sydney to captain Samoa in the 2016 Polynesian Cup against Tonga, playing off the interchange bench in the 18–6 win at Parramatta Stadium.

== Statistics ==
=== NRL ===
Year	Team	Games	Tries	Pts
2007	Melbourne Storm	12	1	4
2008	Melbourne Storm	6	1	4
2009	Gold Coast Titans	9	1	4
2010	Gold Coast Titans	16	2	8
2011	Gold Coast Titans	8	1	4
2011	Cronulla-Sutherland Sharks	12	1	4
2012	Cronulla-Sutherland Sharks	13	1	4
2013	Cronulla-Sutherland Sharks	21	2	8
2014	Cronulla-Sutherland Sharks	18	3	12
2015	Cronulla-Sutherland Sharks	20	2	8
2016	Cronulla-Sutherland Sharks	21		
2017	Cronulla-Sutherland Sharks	12		
2018	Brisbane Broncos	4		
	Totals	174	15	60

=== Reserve grade ===
Year	Team	Games	Tries	Goals	Pts
2019	Souths Logan Magpies	22	3	1	14
2018	Norths Devils	18	7		28
2017	Newtown Jets	11	4		16
2016	Newtown Jets	4			
	Totals	55	14	1	58
