= 2015 South Sydney Rabbitohs season =

- NRL Rank: 7th
- Play-off result: Elimination Final
- 2015 record: Wins: 13; draws: 0; losses: 11
- Points scored: For: 465; against: 467

Team information
- CEO: Shane Richardson
- Head Coach: Michael Maguire
- Captain: Greg Inglis
- Stadium: ANZ Stadium

Top scorers
- Tries: Alex Johnston (17)
- Goals: Adam Reynolds (53)
- Points: Adam Reynolds (111)
← 2014	List of seasons	2016 →

The 2015 South Sydney Rabbitohs season is the 106th in the club's history. Coached by Michael Maguire and captained by Greg Inglis, they are competing in the National Rugby League's 2015 Telstra Premiership.

== Squad List ==
South Sydney Rabbitohs Squad 2015
First team squad			Coaching staff
Kirisome Auva'a – CE, WG; Nathan Brown – PR; George Burgess – PR; Tom Burgess – SR, PR; Paul Carter – HK, LK, SR; Jason Clark – LK, HK, SR; Bryson Goodwin (gk) – WG, CE; Tim Grant – PR; Aaron Gray – CE, WG; Chris Grevsmuhl – SR, LK, PR; Greg Inglis (c) – FB, CE, FE; Luke Keary (gk) – FE, HB, HK; Ben Lowe – LK, SR	Issac Luke (gk) – HK; Sam Manuleleua – WG; Sione Masima – SR, LK; Cameron McInnes – HK; Chris McQueen – SR, CE, LK; Daryl Millard – CE, WG; Ed Murphy – CE, WG; John Olive – CE, WG; Joel Reddy – WG, CE; Adam Reynolds (gk) – HB, FE; Scott Sorensen – HK, SR, LK; Glenn Stewart – LK, SR, FE; John Sutton – FE, SR, LK, HB (vc)	Kyle Turner – LK, SR, CE; David Tyrrell – SR, LK; Cody Walker – HB, FE; Dylan Walker – CE, WG, FE, FB	Head coach: Michael Maguire; Assistant coaches: Kurt Wrigley (assistant); Wayne Collins (assistant); Troy Thomson (high performance manager); Sean Edwards (strength and conditioning); Legend: (c) Captain(s); (vc) Vice-captain(s); (gk) Goal kicker; Did not play a first Grade game for Souths in 2015; Updated: 15 August 2015; Source(s): Rabbitohs Squad

== Awards ==
Year	George Piggins Medal	Jack Rayner Players' Player Award	Bob McCarthy Clubman of the Year Award	John Sattler Rookie of the year Award	Burrow Appreciation Award	Roy Asotasi Members Choice	Tooheys New Fan Player of the Year	NYC Best and Fairest Award	NYC Players' Player of the Year Award
2015	Greg Inglis	Greg Inglis	Ben Lowe	Chris Grevsmuhl	Jason Clark	Bryson Goodwin	Alex Johnston	Cheyne Whitelaw	Cheyne Whitelaw

== Squad Positions ==
Round	Fullback	Winger 1	Centre 1	Centre 2	Winger 2	Five Eight	Halfback	Prop 1	Hooker	Prop 2	Second Row 1	Second Row 2	Lock	Bench 1	Bench 2	Bench 3	Bench 4
1	Inglis	Johnston	Walker	Goodwin	Reddy	Keary	Reynolds	G. Burgess	Luke	Tyrrell	Stewart	Sutton	Lowe	Grevsmuhl	Clark	McQueen	T. Burgess
2	Inglis	Johnston	Walker	Goodwin	Reddy	Keary	Reynolds	G. Burgess	Luke	Tyrrell	Stewart	Sutton	McQueen	Lowe	Grevsmuhl	Clark	T. Burgess
3	Inglis	Johnston	Walker	Goodwin	Reddy	Keary	Reynolds	G. Burgess	Luke	Tyrrell	Stewart	Grant	McQueen	Grevsmuhl	Clark	T. Burgess	McInnes
4	Inglis	Johnston	Millard	Goodwin	Reddy	Keary	Reynolds	G. Burgess	Luke	Tyrrell	Stewart	McQueen	Grant	McInnes	Grevsmuhl	T. Burgess	Lowe
5	Inglis	Johnston	Millard	Goodwin	Reddy	Keary	Reynolds	G. Burgess	Luke	Tyrrell	Stewart	McQueen	Clark	Grant	Lowe	Grevsmuhl	T. Burgess
6	Inglis	Johnston	Millard	Goodwin	Reddy	Stewart	Keary	G. Burgess	Luke	Tyrrell	Grevsmuhl	McQueen	Clark	Lowe	Grant	T. Burgess	Brown
7	Inglis	Johnston	Walker	Goodwin	Reddy	McInnes	Keary	G. Burgess	Luke	Tyrrell	Stewart	McQueen	Clark	Brown	Grant	T. Burgess	Grevsmuhl
8	Inglis	Johnston	Walker	Goodwin	Reddy	Gray	Keary	G. Burgess	Luke	T. Burgess	Stewart	McQueen	Grevsmuhl	McInnes	Tyrrell	Clark	Grant
9	Inglis	Johnston	Walker	Goodwin	Gray	Keary	Reynolds	G. Burgess	McInnes	Tyrrell	Sutton	McQueen	Lowe	Luke	Grevsmuhl	T. Burgess	Grant
10	Inglis	Johnston	Walker	Goodwin	Gray	Sutton	Keary	G. Burgess	McInnes	Tyrrell	Grevsmuhl	McQueen	Lowe	Luke	Brown	T. Burgess	Grant
11	Johnston	Reddy	Walker	Goodwin	Gray	Sutton	Keary	G. Burgess	Luke	Tyrrell	Lowe	McQueen	Clark	McInnes	Brown	Grant	T. Burgess
12	Inglis	Johnston	Walker	Goodwin	Gray	Sutton	Keary	T. Burgess	Luke	Tyrrell	Brown	McQueen	Clark	McInnes	Grant	G. Burgess	Grevsmuhl
13	Inglis	Johnston	Walker	Goodwin	Gray	Sutton	Keary	T. Burgess	Luke	Tyrrell	Brown	McQueen	Lowe	Clark	Grevsmuhl	Grant	G. Burgess
14	Johnston	Olive	Walker	Goodwin	Gray	Keary	Reynolds	T. Burgess	McInnes	Tyrrell	Sutton	McQueen	Lowe	Clark	Grevsmuhl	Brown	G. Burgess
16	Inglis	Johnston	Walker	Goodwin	Gray	Keary	Reynolds	G. Burgess	Luke	Grant	McQueen	Sutton	Lowe	Stewart	Grevsmuhl	Tyrrell	T. Burgess
17	Johnston	Reddy	Walker	Goodwin	Gray	Keary	Reynolds	G. Burgess	Luke	Tyrrell	Stewart	Sutton	McQueen	Lowe	Grevsmuhl	T. Burgess	Clark
19	Inglis	Johnston	Walker	Goodwin	Gray	Keary	Reynolds	G. Burgess	McInnes	Grant	Stewart	Sutton	McQueen	Tyrrell	Lowe	Grevsmuhl	T. Burgess
20	Inglis	Johnston	Walker	Goodwin	Reddy	Keary	Reynolds	G. Burgess	Luke	Grant	Stewart	Sutton	McQueen	Lowe	Grevsmuhl	Tyrrell	T. Burgess
21	Inglis	Johnston	Walker	Goodwin	Gray	Keary	Reynolds	G. Burgess	Luke	Grant	Stewart	Sutton	McQueen	Turner	Grevsmuhl	Tyrrell	T. Burgess
22	Inglis	Johnston	Walker	Goodwin	Gray	Keary	Reynolds	G. Burgess	Luke	Grant	Stewart	Sutton	McQueen	Grevsmuhl	Tyrrell	T. Burgess	Clark
23	Inglis	Johnston	Walker	Auva'a	Goodwin	Keary	Reynolds	G. Burgess	Luke	Tyrrell	Turner	Sutton	McQueen	Clark	Grant	T. Burgess	Carter
24	Inglis	Johnston	Walker	Auva'a	Goodwin	Sutton	Reynolds	G. Burgess	McInnes	Tyrrell	Turner	Clark	McQueen	Carter	Stewart	Grant	T. Burgess
25	Walker	Johnston	Auva'a	Goodwin	Reddy	Keary	Reynolds	G. Burgess	Luke	Tyrrell	Stewart	Sutton	Turner	Clark	Grevsmuhl	Grant	T. Burgess
26	Johnston	Reddy	Walker	Auva'a	Goodwin	Keary	Reynolds	G. Burgess	McInnes	T. Burgess	Stewart	McQueen	Turner	Clark	Grevsmuhl	Grant	Carter
FW1	Inglis	Johnston	Walker	Auva'a	Goodwin	Keary	Reynolds	T. Burgess	McInnes	Tyrrell	Grevsmuhl	McQueen	Turner	Clark	Carter	Stewart	Grant

== Squad Movement ==
=== Gains ===
Player	Signed from	Until end of	Notes
Paul Carter	Gold Coast Titans	2016	Due to being sacked from the Titans
Michael Oldfield	Catalans Dragons	2016	
Sam Burgess	Bath Rugby	2018	
Damien Cook	Canterbury Bulldogs	2017	

=== Losses ===
Player	2015 Club	Notes
Isaac Luke	New Zealand Warriors	
Ben Lowe	Retirement	
Chris McQueen	Gold Coast Titans	
Glenn Stewart	Catalans Dragons	
Dylan Walker	Manly-Warringah Sea Eagles	Walker was originally released by souths before signing with Manly.

=== Re-signings ===
Player	Club	Until end of	Notes
Thomas Burgess	South Sydney Rabbitohs	2016	
Alex Johnston	South Sydney Rabbitohs	2017	
Luke Keary	South Sydney Rabbitohs	2016	
Cameron McInnes	South Sydney Rabbitohs	2017	
Adam Reynolds	South Sydney Rabbitohs	2017	
David Tyrrell	South Sydney Rabbitohs	2017	
Aaron Gray	South Sydney Rabbitohs	2017	
Bryson Goodwin	South Sydney Rabbitohs	2017	

== 2015 Tops ==
=== Appearances ===
Rank	Appearances (/25)	Player	Notes
=1	25	Tom Burgess	
=1	25	Bryson Goodwin	
=1	25	Alex Johnston	

=== Try Scores ===
Rank	Tries	Player	Notes
1	17	Alex Johnston	
2	13	Dylan Walker	
3	8	Greg Inglis	
4	7	Aaron Gray	
=5	6	Bryson Goodwin	
=5	6	Chris Grevsmuhl	

=== Goal Kickers ===
Rank	Goals Kicked	Player	Notes
1	53	Adam Reynolds	
2	19	Issac Luke	
3	2	Bryson Goodwin	

=== Field Goal Kickers ===
Rank	Goals Kicked	Player	Notes
1	1	Adam Reynolds	

=== Point Scores ===
Rank	Points	Player	Notes
1	111	Adam Reynolds	1t, 53g, 1fg
2	68	Alex Johnston	17t
3	52	Dylan Walker	13t
4	50	Isaac Luke	3t,19g
5	32	Greg Inglis	8t

== Ladder ==
2015 NRL season
Pos	Team	Pld	W	D	L	B	PF	PA	PD	Pts
1	Sydney Roosters	24	18	0	6	2	591	300	+291	40
2	Brisbane Broncos	24	17	0	7	2	574	379	+195	38
3	North Queensland Cowboys (P)	24	17	0	7	2	587	454	+133	38
4	Melbourne Storm	24	14	0	10	2	467	348	+119	32
5	Canterbury-Bankstown Bulldogs	24	14	0	10	2	522	480	+42	32
6	Cronulla-Sutherland Sharks	24	14	0	10	2	469	476	−7	32
7	South Sydney Rabbitohs	24	13	0	11	2	465	467	−2	30
8	St. George Illawarra Dragons	24	12	0	12	2	435	408	+27	28
9	Manly-Warringah Sea Eagles	24	11	0	13	2	458	492	−34	26
10	Canberra Raiders	24	10	0	14	2	577	569	+8	24
11	Penrith Panthers	24	9	0	15	2	399	477	−78	22
12	Parramatta Eels	24	9	0	15	2	448	573	−125	22
13	New Zealand Warriors	24	9	0	15	2	445	588	−143	22
14	Gold Coast Titans	24	9	0	15	2	439	636	−197	22
15	Wests Tigers	24	8	0	16	2	487	562	−75	20
16	Newcastle Knights	24	8	0	16	2	458	612	−154	20

== Fixtures ==
=== Pre-season ===
In 2015, the Rabbitohs again competed in three pre-season trial matches.

Date	Round	Opponent	Venue	Score	Attendance	Report
Sat 9 Feb	Return to Redfern	Papua New Guinea	ATP Performance Centre, Redfern	38–12	5,000	
Sat 16 Feb	Coffs Harbour Trial	Newcastle Knights	BCU International Stad., Coffs Harbour	12–18	4,000	
Fri 22 Feb	Charity Shield	St. George Illawarra Dragons	ANZ Stadium, Sydney	28–12	20,675	
Legend: Win 13+ Win Loss 13+ Loss Draw

=== NRL Auckland Nines ===
The NRL Auckland Nines is a pre-season rugby league nines competition featuring all 16 NRL clubs. The 2015 competition was played over two days on 31 Jan and 1 Feb at Eden Park in Auckland, New Zealand. The Rabbitohs won the competition beating the Sharks in the grand final.

=== Regular season ===
Win	Lose	Draw
Green	Red	Yellow

Round	Vs	Score (Souths points first)	Lineup and player stats	Tries	Goals	Field Goals	Notes
1	Brisbane Broncos	36–6		Dylan Walker (28'); John Sutton (43'); Greg Inglis (47'); Luke Keary (57'); Joel Reddy (69')	*Adam Reynolds (8/8)	–	Dylan Walker scored the first try of the 2015 NRL season Souths Debut Game: Glenn Stewart (2nd Row 1) &; Chris Grevsmuhl (Interchange); NRL Team of the week: 1. Greg Inglis; 7. Adam Reynolds; 16. Thomas Burgess
2	Sydney Roosters	34–26		Dylan Walker (6'); Alex Johnston (13'); George Burgess (51'); Alex Johnston (61'); Joel Reddy (69'); Issac Luke (79')	*Adam Reynolds (5/6)	–	NRL Team of the week: 2. Alex Johnston; 6. Luke Keary; 10. George Burgess; 12. Glenn Stewart
3	West Tigers	20–6		Alex Johnston (35'); Dylan Walker (40'); Greg Inglis (46'); Dylan Walker (75')	*Adam Reynolds (2/4)	–	Souths Debut Game: Tim Grant; NRL Team of the week: 1. Greg Inglis; 7. Dylan Walker
4	Parramatta Eels	16–29		Joel Reddy (9'); Chris Grevsmuhl (34'); Alex Johnston (61')	*Adam Reynolds (2/3)	–	Souths Debut Game: Daryl Millard (Centre 1)
5	Canterbury-Bankstown Bulldogs	18–17		Isaac Luke (39'); Dave Tyrrell (59')	Adam Reynolds (4/4); Bryson Goodwin (1/1)	–	NRL team of the Week: 15. Chris McQueen
6	North Queensland Cowboys	12–30		Dave Tyrrell (2'); Alex Johnston (20')	Isaac Luke (2/2)	–	Souths Debut Game: Nathan Brown (Interchange)
7	Cronulla Sharks	10–18		Alex Johnston (31'); Chris McQueen (53')	Isaac Luke (1/2)	–	
8	Canberra Raiders	22–30		Chris McQueen (19'); Bryson Goodwin (26'); Greg Inglis (35'); Luke Keary (59')	Isaac Luke (3/4)	–	Souths Debut Game: Aaron Gray (Five Eight); NRL team of the Week: 15. Chris McQueen
9	St George Illawarra Dragons	16–10		Aaron Gray (33'); Aaron Gray (47'); Alex Johnston (58')	Adam Reynolds (2/4)	–	NRL team of the Week: 15. Ben Lowe
10	Melbourne Storm	12–16		Alex Johnston (48'); Aaron Gray (55')	Isaac Luke (1/2); Bryson Goodwin (1/1)	–	
11	Parramatta Eels	14–12		Aaron Gray (9'); Aaron Gray (55'); Cameron McInnes (75')	Isaac Luke (1/3)	–	NRL team of the Week: 5. Aaron Gray; 7 Luke Keary; 17 Thomas Burgess; 100th First Grade Game (all for Souths): Jason Clark
12	Gold Coast Titans	'22–16		Greg Inglis (23'); Chris Grevsmuhl (48'); Alex Johnston (61'); Chris Grevsmuhl (71')	Isaac Luke (3/4)	–	NRL team of the Week: 6. John Sutton; 12. Nathan Brown
13	New Zealand Warriors	'36–6		Bryson Goodwin (8'); Chris Grevsmuhl (37'); Tim Grant (40'); Dylan Walker (51'); Alex Johnston (62'); Dylan Walker (75')	Isaac Luke (6/8)	–	NRL team of the Week: 4. Dylan Walker; 50th South Sydney Rabbitohs Games: Dylan Walker
14	West Tigers	6–34		Bryson Goodwin (16)	Adam Reynolds (1/1)	–	South Sydney Rabbitohs First Grade Debuts: John Olive; 150th NRL Grade Game (all for souths including NYC and NRL): Jason Clark
15	BYE						
16	Manly Sea Eagles	20–8		Aaron Gray (28'); Bryson Goodwin (45'); Aaron Gray (48'); Luke Keary (63')	Isaac Luke (2/5)	–	NRL team of the Week: 8. George Burgess
17	Penrith Panthers	6–20		Joel Reddy (74')	Adam Reynolds (1/1)	–	

=== Finals 2015 ===
13 September
4:10pm

Cronulla Sutherland Sharks	28–12	South Sydney Rabbitohs

Allianz Stadium
Attendance:
Man of the Match:
Referee: Matt Cecchin, Ashley Klein

Qualifying and elimination finals
11 Sept, Sydney Football Stadium
1	Sydney Roosters	18
4	Melbourne	20
12 Sept, Stadium Australia
5	Canterbury	11
8	St. George Illawarra	10
13 Sept, Sydney Football Stadium
6	Cronulla	28
7	Souths	12
12 Sept, Lang Park
2	Brisbane	16
3	North Queensland	12

Semi-finals
18 Sept, Sydney Football Stadium
Sydney Roosters	38
Canterbury	12
19 Sept, Willows Sports Complex
North Queensland	39
Cronulla	0

Preliminary finals
26 Sept, Melbourne Rectangular Stadium
Melbourne	12
North Queensland	32
25 Sept, Lang Park
Brisbane	31
Sydney Roosters	12

Grand final
4 Oct, Stadium Australia
Brisbane	16
North Queensland	17

== Player statistics ==
Player	Appearances	Tries	Goals	Field Goals	Total Points
Kirisome Auva'a	5	0	0	0	0
Nathan Brown	7	0	0	0	0
George Burgess	24	1	0	0	4
Tom Burgess	25	2	0	0	8
Paul Carter	4	0	0	0	0
Jason Clark	18	2	0	0	8
Bryson Goodwin	25	6	2	0	28
Tim Grant	21	1	0	0	4
Aaron Gray	12	7	0	0	28
Chris Grevsmuhl	22	6	0	0	24
Greg Inglis (c)	20	7	0	0	28
Alex Johnston	25	17	0	0	68
Luke Keary	24	4	0	0	16
Ben Lowe	14	0	0	0	0
Issac Luke	20	3	19	0	46
Sam Manuleleua	0	0	0	0	0
Sione Masima	0	0	0	0	0
Cameron McInnes	13	1	0	0	4
Chris McQueen	24	2	0	0	8
Daryl Millard	3	0	0	0	0
Ed Murphy	0	0	0	0	0
John Olive	1	0	0	0	0
Joel Reddy	13	4	0	0	16
Adam Reynolds	18	1	53	1	111
Scott Sorensen	0	0	0	0	0
Glenn Stewart	18	0	0	0	0
John Sutton	17	2	0	0	8
Setefano Taukafa	0	0	0	0	0
Kyle Turner	6	0	0	0	0
David Tyrrell	24	2	0	0	8
Cody Walker	0	0	0	0	0
Dylan Walker	22	13	0	0	52
Total	(Players) 32	70 – (280pts)	62 – (124pts)	1 – (1pt)	405

== Representative Honours ==
Name	All Stars	ANZAC Test	Pacific Test	City / Country	State of Origin 1	State of Origin 2	State of Origin 3	Kiwis Tour	Prime Ministers XIII
Jason Clark	–	–	–	City	–	–	–		–
Chris Grevsmuhl	Indigenous All Stars	–	–	–	–	–	–		–
Greg Inglis	Indigenous All Stars	Australia	–	–	Queensland	Queensland	Queensland		–
Alex Johnston	Indigenous All Stars	Australia	–	–	–	–	–		Winger
Isaac Luke	–	New Zealand	–	–	–	–		–	
Chris McQueen	–	–	–	–	–	–	–		Second Row
Daryl Millard	–	–	Fiji	–	–	–		–	
Adam Reynolds	–	–	–	–	–	–	–		Halfback
Kyle Turner	Indigenous All Stars	–	–	–	–	–	–		–
Dylan Walker	NRL All Stars	–	–	–	–	–	–		–
Named on Team but did not play either due to injury or not selected in the final 17
Alex Johnston	–	–	–		–	–	18th Man		–
Luke Keary	–	–	–	City (Injured)	–	–	–		–
David Tyrell	–	–	–	–	–	–	–		18th Man
Dylan Walker	–	–	–	City (Injured)	–	18th Man	–		–
