= 2016 South Sydney Rabbitohs season =

- NRL Rank: 12th
- 2016 record: Wins: 9; draws: 0; losses: 15
- Points scored: For: 473; against: 549

Team information
- CEO: Shane Richardson
- Head Coach: Michael Maguire
- Captain: Greg Inglis
- Stadium: ANZ Stadium

Top scorers
- Tries: Alex Johnston (11)
- Goals: Adam Reynolds (43)
- Points: Adam Reynolds (95)
| ← 2015 | List of seasons | 2017 → |

The 2016 South Sydney Rabbitohs season is the 107th in the club's history. Coached by Michael Maguire and captained by Greg Inglis, they are competing in the National Rugby League's 2016 Telstra Premiership.

== Pre-season ==
The South Sydney Rabbitohs pre-season will consist of:

- Auckland Nines tournament playing the Sydney Roosters, Parramatta Eels and Melbourne Storm in the round robin on 6 and 7 February.
- The 33rd Charity Shield against the St. George Illawarra Dragons on 13 February.
- A pre-season trial against the Gold Coast Titans at Pizzey Park on 20 February.

Also during the pre-season on 13 February (the same date of the Charity Shield) the All Stars match will be played originally consisting of the following Rabbitohs; Greg Inglis, Alex Johnston, Chris Grevsmuhl (Indigenous All Stars) and Sam Burgess, Tom Burgess (World All Stars). However, as of 9 February, Johnston and Grevsmuhl withdrew with injuries and Sam Burgess chose not to participate. Adam Reynolds has since been added to the World All Stars team.

=== Auckland Nines ===
South Sydney started the year with the 2016 NRL Auckland Nines. They were captained by 2014 Premiership winning captain John Sutton. This years nines tournament saw Damien Cook, Michael Oldfield, Hymel Hunt and Cody Walker make their rabbitohs debuts along with a number of under South Sydney NYC players playing. South Sydney started with a win over the Sydney Roosters, Souths won the match 14–13 to extend their Nines winning streak to 7 strait matches. Alex Johnston, Kirisome Auvaa and Michael Oldfield scored tries with new recruit Damien Cook kicking the winning goal. South Sydney then faced the Melbourne Storm where they lost 18–12. John Olive, Hymel Hunt and Damien Cook scored tries in the match. On day 2 of the nines, Souths needed to either beat or draw with eventual champions the Parramatta Eels. Souths lost the game 24–11 with Bryson Goodwin and Cameron McInnes scoring tries along with a goal from Damien Cook.

== Squad list ==
South Sydney Rabbitohs 2016 Squad
| First team squad | | | Coaching staff |
|---|---|---|---|
| Kirisome Auva'a – CE, WG; Nathan Brown – PR, SR; George Burgess – PR; Sam Burgess – LK, PR, SR; Tom Burgess – PR; Paul Carter – SR, LK, HK; Jason Clark – SR, LK, PR; Damien Cook – HK, FE, FB; Angus Crichton – SR, CE; Bryson Goodwin – CE, WG; Jack Gosiewski – SR; Aaron Gray – CE, WG; Brock Gray – SR, PR | Brett Greinke – SR, CE; Hymel Hunt – CE, WG; Greg Inglis (c) – FB, CE, FE; Alex Johnston – FB, WG; Luke Keary – FE, HB, HK; Cameron McInnes – HK; Ed Murphy – CE, WG; Zane Musgrove – PR; Michael Oldfield – WG, CE; Adam Reynolds – HB; Patrice Siolo – SR, LK; John Sutton – FE, LK, SR; Siosifa Talakai – CE, SR | Tautalatasi Tasi – WG, SR; Kyle Turner – SR; David Tyrrell – PR; Cody Walker – FE, HB; Cheyne Whitelaw – LK | Head coach: Michael Maguire; Assistant coaches: Wayne Collins (assistant coach); Kurt Wrigley (assistant coach); Ben Gardiner (NSW Cup coach); David Penna (NYC coach); Ben Lowe (coach); Scott Geddes (coach); Matt King (coach); Eddie Farah (physiotherapist); Harry Harris (head strength and conditioning coach); Troy Thomson (high performance manager); Legend: (c) Captain(s); (vc) Vice-captain(s); Injured; Updated: 20 December 2015; Source(s): Rabbitohs Squad 2016 |

=== 2016 gains ===
| Player | 2015 Club | Until End of | Notes |
|---|---|---|---|
| Sam Burgess | Bath Rugby | 2018 | |
| Damien Cook | Canterbury Bulldogs | 2017 | |
| Hymel Hunt | Melbourne Storm | 2016 | |
| Dane Nielsen | Bradford Bulls | 2017 | |
| Michael Oldfield | Catalans Dragons | 2016 | |

=== 2016 losses ===
| Player | 2016 Club | Notes |
|---|---|---|
| Isaac Luke | New Zealand Warriors | |
| Ben Lowe | Retirement | |
| Chris McQueen | Gold Coast Titans | |
| Darren Nicholls | Brisbane Broncos | |
| John Olive | Gold Coast Titans | |
| Glenn Stewart | Catalans Dragons | |
| Tim Grant | Wests Tigers | |
| Dylan Walker | Manly-Warringah Sea Eagles | |

=== Re-signings ===
| Player | Club | Until End of | Notes |
|---|---|---|---|
| Jack Gosiewski | South Sydney Rabbitohs | 2017 | |
| Cody Walker | South Sydney Rabbitohs | 2019 | |
| Jason Clark | South Sydney Rabbitohs | 2018 | |
| Greg Inglis | South Sydney Rabbitohs | 2020 | |

=== 2017 gains ===
| Player | 2015 Club | Until End of | Notes |
|---|---|---|---|
| Brett Greinke | Brisbane Broncos | 2017 | (Mid season) |
| Robert Jennings | Penrith Panthers | 2018 | |
| Tyrell Fuimaono | Parramatta Eels | 2018 | |
| Braidon Burns | Penrith Panthers | 2018 | |
| Connor Tracey | Cronulla-Sutherland Sharks | 2018 | |
| Robbie Rochow | Newcastle Knights | 2017 | |
| Robbie Farah | Wests Tigers | 2018 | |

=== 2017 losses ===
| Player | 2016 Club | Notes |

== 2016 NRL Season ==
Highest Winning Margin – 42 points (Round 2 Vs Newcastle Knights)

Closest Winning Margin – 2 points (Round 10 Vs Parramatta Eels)

Highest Losing Margin – 50 points (Round 21 Vs Canberra Raiders)

Closest Losing Margin – 1 point (Round 13 Vs Gold Coast Titans), (Round 22 Vs Melbourne Storm)

Most Points Scored by Souths in a Match – 48 (Round 2 Vs Newcastle Knights)

Least Points Scored by Souths in a Match – 0 (Round 17 Vs North Queensland Cowboys)

Most Points Scored against Souths in a Match – 54 (Round 21 Vs Canberra Raiders)

Least Points Scored against Souths in a Match – 6 (Round 2 Vs Newcastle Knights), (Round 25 Vs Cronulla-Sutherland Sharks)

Longest Winning Streak – 4 Matches, Round 23 – Round 26

Longest Losing Streak – 9 Matches, Round 13 – Round 22

== Significant rounds ==
- Round 1 (Vs Sydney Roosters), Damien Cook and Hymel Hunt Rabbitohs debut games.
- Round 1 (Vs Sydney Roosters), Zane Musgrove, Cody Walker NRL first grade debut games.
- Round 4 (Vs Canterbury-Bankstown Bulldogs), Michael Oldfield Rabbitohs debut.
- Round 5 (Vs Manly Warringah Sea Eagles), Luke Keary 50th NRL first grade game (all for SSR).
- Round 5 (Vs Manly Warringah Sea Eagles), Sam Burgess 100th NRL first grade game (all for SSR).
- Round 5 (Vs Manly Warringah Sea Eagles), South Sydney Rabbitohs 35, 000th point scored (try scored by souths junior and hooker Cameron McInnes).
- Round 8 (Vs Brisbane Broncos), Dane Nielsen Rabbitohs debut game.
- Round 9 (Vs Wests Tigers), Patrice Siolo Rabbitohs debut game.
- Round 10 (Vs Parramatta Eels), Jack Gosiewski NRL first grade debut game.
- Round 11 (Vs St George Illawarra), Bryson Goodwin 150th NRL first grade game.
- Round 11 (Vs St George Illawarra), Bryson Goodwin 500th NRL first grade point.
- Round 11 (Vs St George Illawarra), Adam Reynolds 800th NRL first grade point.

== Player appearances ==
| FB=Fullback | C=Centre | W=Winger | FE=Five-Eight | HB=Halfback | PR=Prop | H=Hooker | SR=Second Row | L=Lock | B=Bench |

| No | Player | 1 | 2 | 3 | 4 | 5 | 6 | 7 | 8 | 9 | 10 | 11 | 12 | 13 | 14 | 15 | 16 | 17 | 18 | 19 | 20 | 21 | 22 | 23 | 24 | 25 | 26 |
|---|---|---|---|---|---|---|---|---|---|---|---|---|---|---|---|---|---|---|---|---|---|---|---|---|---|---|---|
| 1 | Greg Inglis | FB | FB | FB | FB | FB | FB | FB | FB | FB | FE | FE | Bye | FE | FE | | C | C | Bye | Red card | Red card | Red card | FB | FB | FB | FB | FB |
| 2 | Alex Johnston | W | W | W | | | | | | | FB | FB | Bye | W | W | W | FB | W | Bye | W | W | W | W | W | W | W | W |
| 3 | Bryson Goodwin | C | C | C | C | | W | W | W | C | C | C | Bye | C | SR | | | | Bye | | C | | | | | | |
| 4 | Hymel Hunt | C | C | C | C | C | C | C | C | | | | Bye | | | | | | Bye | | | | C | C | C | C | C |
| 5 | Aaron Gray | W | W | W | W | W | W | W | W | W | | | Bye | | C | W | W | C | Bye | C | C | C | C | C | C | C | C |
| 6 | Cody Walker | FE | FE | FE | FE | FE | FE | | | | | W | Bye | FB | FB | FE | FE | FB | Bye | FB | FB | FB | FE | FE | FE | FE | FE |
| 7 | Adam Reynolds | HB | | | | | | HB | HB | HB | HB | HB | Bye | HB | HB | | | HB | Bye | | HB | HB | HB | HB | HB | HB | HB |
| 8 | Sam Burgess | PR | L | L | | PR | PR | L | L | L | L | L | Bye | L | L | L | L | L | Bye | L | L | L | L | L | L | L | L |
| 9 | Cameron McInnes | H | H | H | H | H | H | H | B | B | H | H | Bye | H | H | H | H | H | Bye | H | H | H | | | | | |
| 10 | David Tyrrell | PR | PR | PR | PR | B | | PR | PR | PR | | | Bye | B | PR | PR | B | B | Bye | PR | PR | | | | | | |
| 11 | Paul Carter | SR | SR | SR | SR | | B | B | SR | Red card | SR | SR | Bye | SR | SR | B | Red card | | Bye | Sacked | | | | | | | |
| 12 | John Sutton | SR | | | | | | | | | | | Bye | | | SR | SR | SR | Bye | FE | SR | SR | SR | SR | SR | SR | SR |
| 13 | Kyle Turner | L | SR | SR | SR | SR | SR | SR | | SR | SR | SR | Bye | SR | B | SR | SR | SR | Bye | SR | SR | C | SR | SR | SR | SR | SR |
| 14 | Damien Cook | B | B | B | B | B | B | | H | H | | | Bye | | | B | | B | Bye | B | | B | H | H | H | H | H |
| 15 | Jason Clark | B | B | B | B | B | B | B | B | | B | B | Bye | B | B | B | B | B | Bye | B | B | B | B | B | B | B | B |
| 16 | Chris Grevsmuhl | B | | | B | SR | SR | SR | SR | SR | | Released: Penrith Panthers | Bye | | | | | | Bye | | | | | | | | |
| 17 | Zane Musgrove | B | | | | | | | | | | | Bye | | | | | | Bye | | | PR | PR | PR | Red card | B | B |
| 18 | Luke Keary | Red card | HB | HB | HB | HB | HB | FE | FE | FE | B | B | Bye | B | | HB | HB | FE | Bye | HB | FE | FE | | | | | |
| 19 | George Burgess | Red card | PR | PR | PR | PR | PR | B | | | B | B | Bye | | | | | | Bye | B | B | PR | PR | B | FR | FR | FR |
| 20 | Nathan Brown | | B | B | L | L | L | B | B | B | FR | FR | Bye | FR | B | B | FR | FR | Bye | SR | B | B | | | B | B | B |
| 21 | Kirisome Auva'a | | B | B | B | C | C | C | B | C | C | C | Bye | C | C | C | | | Bye | Sacked | | | | | | | |
| 22 | Michael Oldfield | | | | W | W | | | | | W | | Bye | | | | | | Bye | | | W | | | | | |
| 23 | Thomas Burgess | | | | | FR | B | PR | PR | PR | PR | PR | Bye | PR | PR | PR | PR | PR | Bye | PR | PR | Red card | B | PR | PR | PR | PR |
| 24 | Dane Nielsen | | | | | | | | C | W | W | W | Bye | W | C | W | | | Bye | | | | | | | | |
| 25 | Patrice Siolo | | | | | | | | | B | | | Bye | | | | B | x | Bye | | | | | | | | |
| 26 | Jack Gosiewski | | | | | | | | | | B | B | Bye | B | | | | | Bye | | | B | | B | B | | |
| 26 | Siosifa Talakai | | | | | | | | | | | | Bye | | B | B | C | | Bye | | | | | | | | |
| 27 | Ed Murphy | | | | | | | | | | | | Bye | | | | | C | Bye | | C | | | | | | |
| 28 | Joe Burgess | Contracted to Sydney Roosters | | | | | | | | | | | Bye | | | | W | W | Bye | W | W | x | W | W | W | W | W |
| 29 | Tautalatasi Tasi | | | | | | | | | | | | Bye | | | | B | B | Bye | | | | | | | | |
| 30 | Angus Crichton | | | | | | | | | | | | Bye | | | | | | Bye | B | B | SR | B | B | B | B | B |

= Injured

= Suspended

/ = Unable to play due to State of Origin camp.

| Player | Appearances | Tries | Goals | Field Goals | Total Points |
| – | – | – | – | – | – |

== Representative honours ==
=== Domestic ===
| Pos. | Player | Team | Call-up |
|---|---|---|---|
| FB | Greg Inglis | Indigenous All Stars | 2016 All Stars match |
| HB | Adam Reynolds | World All Stars | 2016 All Stars match |
| PR | Thomas Burgess | World All Stars | 2016 All Stars match |
| CE | Aaron Gray | NSW City | 2016 City vs Country Origin |
| BE | Nathan Brown | NSW Country | 2016 City vs Country Origin |
| CE | Greg Inglis | Queensland | 2016 State of Origin |
| HB | Adam Reynolds | NSW | 2016 State of Origin |

=== International ===
| Pos. | Player | Team | Call-up |
|---|---|---|---|
| CE | Greg Inglis | Australia | 2016 Anzac Test |
| CE | Kirisome Auva'a | Samoa | 2016 Polynesian Cup |
| WG | Michael Oldfield | Tonga | 2016 Polynesian Cup |
| CE | Greg Inglis | Australia | 2016 Four Nations |
| LK | Sam Burgess (C) | England | 2016 Four Nations |
| PR | Thomas Burgess | England | 2016 Four Nations |
| PR | George Burgess | England | 2016 Four Nations |

== Individual honours ==
| George Piggins Medal | Jack Rayner Players' Player Award | Bob McCarthy Clubman of the Year Award | John Sattler Rookie of the year Award | Roy Asotasi Members’ Choice Award | The Burrow Appreciation Award | NYC Best and Fairest Award | NYC Players’ Player |
|---|---|---|---|---|---|---|---|
| Sam Burgess | Sam Burgess | Jason Clark | Cody Walker | Cody Walker | Kyle Turner | Maia Sands | Maia Sands |

== Controversies ==
=== Luke Keary Vs Russell Crowe in Coffs Harbour ===
In January, Keary was involved in an ugly bust-up with actor and Rabbitohs club co-owner Russell Crowe in a boozy pre-season bonding session at Crowe's farm in Nana Glen, New South Wales. It was revealed that Keary was furious at Crowe after he berated him, Cameron McInnes and some of the younger players. Keary defended them then Crowe told him that he not worth the money of his contract, sending Keary into a rage towards Crowe then at senior Rabbitohs leader Sam Burgess for reportedly not sticking up for the younger players. After that he was ordered by Crowe to leave his property, so left catching a taxi at about 3:00am. Keary later signed a contract to join rivals the Sydney Roosters from the start of 2017.

=== Chris Grevsmuhl walking out on the Club ===
In January, it was revealed that Grevsmuhl had signed a 2-year contract with the Penrith Panthers starting in 2017. On 20 May, Grevsmuhl joined the Panthers mid-season after being released from the remainder of his Rabbitohs contract. He said that he was unwilling to play under Rabbitohs coach Michael Maguire any further. Grevsmuhl said, "He’s a mind-game specialist. He breaks you down mentally. He questioned why I was there, the effort I was putting in, and questioned why I was talking to other clubs.

=== Kirisome Auva'a Sacking ===
On 13 July 2016, Auva’a was sacked by the Rabbitohs for a second breach of the NRL’s Testing Policy for illicit substances. While Auva’a, did not return a positive test for an illicit or hazardous substance in this instance, he contravened the rules as set out in the NRL Policy. Under the terms of the policy, the Rabbitohs had the right to terminate the troubled star’s contract for a second breach. In a statement released on Thursday afternoon, South Sydney said they would “continue to offer welfare assistance and support to Kirisome”.

=== Paul Carter Sacking ===
In July 2016 (while contracted with the Rabbitohs) Carter was sacked because he failed to attend a training session following a weekend bender. This was not Carter's first breach of conduct with the club.

Following Carter's sacking by the Rabbitohs, he checked into an alcohol rehabilitation centre in Thailand.
