= 2015 World Club Series =

- Duration: 3 games
- Teams: 6
- Highest attendance: 20,842 Wigan Warriors vs Brisbane Broncos
- Lowest attendance: 13,080 Warrington Wolves vs St George Illawarra Dragons
- Average attendance: 17,301
- Broadcast partners: (United Kingdom) Sky Sports (United Kingdom) BBC Sport (United Kingdom) SLTV; Fox Sports (Australia) (France) beIN Sport (United States) Fox Soccer Plus (Europe) Sport Klub

2015 Series
- World Champions: South Sydney Rabbitohs
- Series Winners: (Australia) NRL
- Top point-scorer: Adam Reynolds (12)
- Top try-scorer: Joel Reddy (2)

The 2015 World Club Series was the inaugural World Club Series and was contested by six clubs (three each from the Super League and National Rugby League), including Super League XIX champions, St Helens R.F.C. and 2014 NRL Premiers, the South Sydney Rabbitohs. The 2015 series marked a departure from the previous format, whereby only the premiers from the two respective competitions would take part.

== Background ==
In September 2014 it was announced that the World Club Series would be overhauled to include six clubs – three each from the Super League and Australia's National Rugby League. The 2015 series will take place between 22–25 February, and will feature three matches, the first and second essentially being two exhibition games and the final game being for the Championship trophy between the two respective premiers as in previous years.

Other than the two aforementioned teams, it was also announced that Super League clubs the Warrington Wolves and Wigan Warriors, as well as National Rugby League clubs the St. George Illawarra Dragons and Brisbane Broncos would also take part.

== Series details ==
=== Series Score ===
Winners	Score	Runners-up
(Australia) NRL	3 - 0	(England) Super League

=== Game 1 ===
20 February 2015

Warrington Wolves	12 – 18	St. George Illawarra Dragons
Tries: Gareth O'Brien (13') 1 Ryan Atkins (30') 1 Goals: Gareth O'Brien 2/3 (14', 59' pen)	1st: 10 - 12; 2nd: 2 - 6	Tries: 1 (2') Tyson Frizell; 1 (19') Joel Thompson; 1 (63') Josh Dugan; Goals: 3/3 Gareth Widdop (3', 20', 64')

Halliwell Jones Stadium, Warrington
Attendance: 13,080
Referee: (England) Ben Thaler

=== Game 2 ===
21 February 2015

Wigan Warriors	12 – 14	Brisbane Broncos
Tries: Liam Farrell (25') 1 Joe Burgess (79') 1 Goals: Matty Smith 2/2 (26', 80')	1st: 6 - 6; 2nd: 6 - 6 ET: 0 - 2	Tries: 1 (7') Andrew McCullough; 1 (56') Lachlan Maranta; Goals: 3/4 Corey Parker (8', 69' pen, 90')

DW Stadium, Wigan
Attendance: 20,842
Referee: (England) Phil Bentham

=== World Club Challenge ===
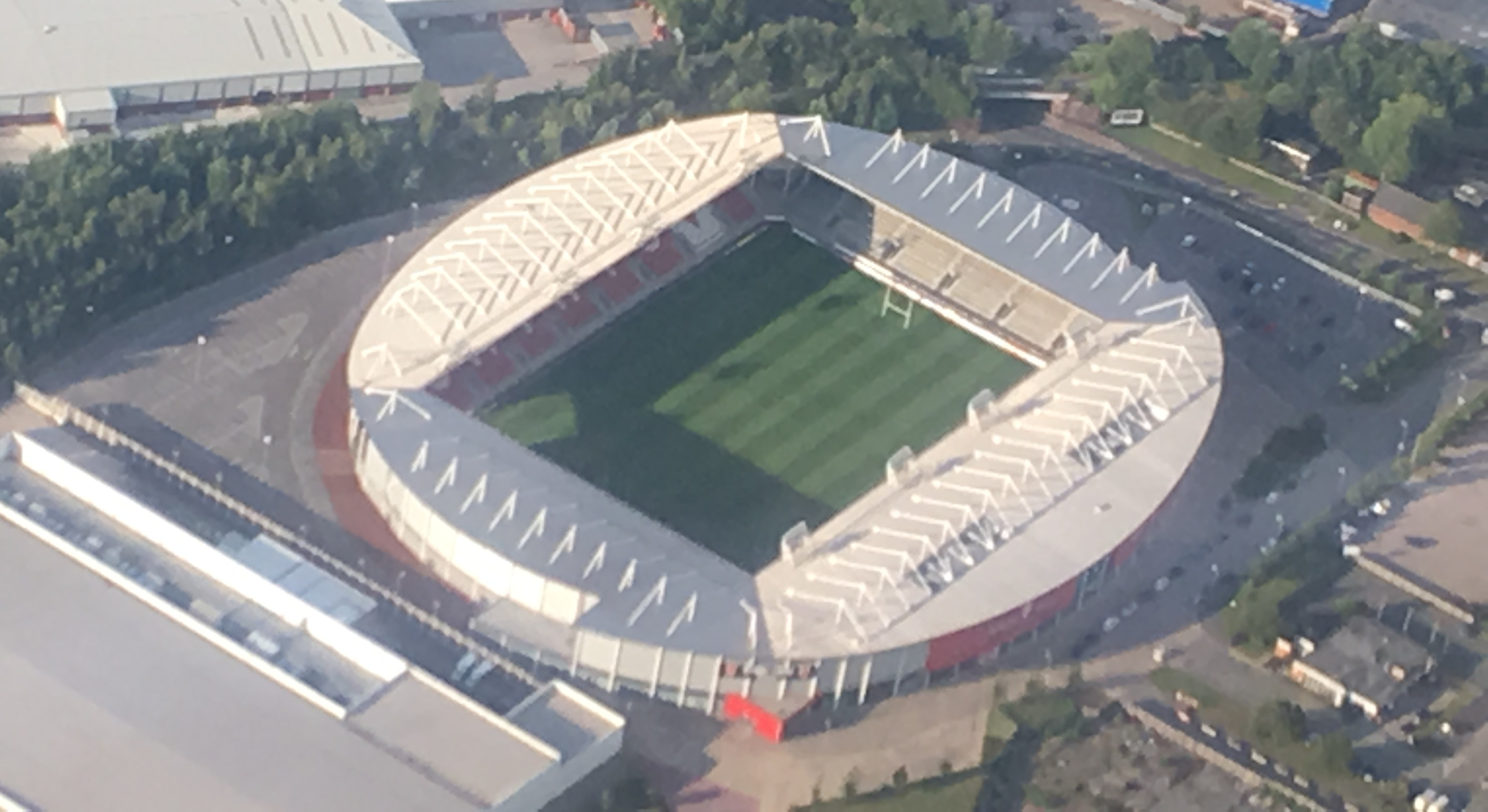
The Totally Wicked Stadium hosted the match

22 February 2015

St Helens	0 – 39	South Sydney Rabbitohs
	1st: 0 – 24; 2nd: 0 – 15	Tries: 2 (31', 67') Joel Reddy; 1 (2') Glenn Stewart; 1 (20') Dylan Walker; 1 (24') Greg Inglis; 1 (47') Luke Keary; 1 (58') Chris McQueen; Goals: 5/8 Adam Reynolds (3', 8' pen, 25', 33', 48'); Field Goals: 1 (78') Adam Reynolds

Langtree Park, St. Helens
Attendance: 17,980
Referee: (England) Richard Silverwood
Player of the Match: George Burgess

==== St. Helens Rugby League Football Club ====
Saints finished Super League XIX's regular season in 1st place and on 11 October 2014 defeated defending premiers the Wigan Warriors 14 - 6 in the 2014 Super League Grand Final, qualifying the Saints for their sixth World Club Challenge overall.

==== South Sydney Rabbitohs ====
The Rabbitohs finished the 2014 NRL season in third place and on 5 October 2014 defeated the 7th-placed Canterbury-Bankstown Bulldogs 30 - 6 in the 2014 NRL Grand Final, qualifying South Sydney for their first World Club Challenge.

2015 World Club Series Final Teams
St Helens	Posit.	South Sydney Rabbitohs
Jonny Lomax	Fullback	Greg Inglis (c)
Tommy Makinson	Winger	Alex Johnston
Mark Percival	Centre	Dylan Walker
Jordan Turner	Centre	Bryson Goodwin
Adam Swift	Winger	Joel Reddy
Travis Burns	Five-eighth	Luke Keary
Jon Wilkin (c)	Halfback	Adam Reynolds
Kyle Amor	Prop	George Burgess
James Roby	Hooker	Issac Luke
Mose Masoe	Prop	David Tyrrell
Joe Greenwood	Second Row	Glenn Stewart
Atelea Vea	Second Row	John Sutton
Mark Flanagan	Lock	Ben Lowe
Louie McCarthy-Scarsbrook	Interchange	Jason Clark
Alex Walmsley	Interchange	Chris McQueen
Luke Thompson	Interchange	Tom Burgess
Andre Savelio	Interchange	Chris Grevsmuhl
Keiron Cunningham	Coach	Michael Maguire
