= Return to Redfern =

Return to Redfern is a rugby league match held every year since 2009 by the South Sydney Rabbitohs at Redfern, New South Wales.

== History of games ==
The first game was South Sydney played the Wests Tigers in a pre-season match on 8 February 2009. The seating capacity for this game was only 5,000, so only members from South Sydney and the Tigers were allowed to purchases tickets for the match. The Tigers won the game 30–26 in front of a sold-out crowd.

Due to the success of the RTR match, the South Sydney Rabbitohs decided to play another trial match on 7 February 2010 against the Manly Sea Eagles. The match was advertised at Souths home games as 'RTR 2010 The Tradition Continues'. Once again, the game was for members only. The game took place approximately 40 years after the famous 1970 NSWRL grand final, in which Souths legend John Sattler played most of the game with a shattered jaw. A teaser for the game was uploaded to YouTube by a Souths fan which details the rivalry between Souths and Manly. Sam Burgess made his debut for the Rabbitohs and scored a try as South Sydney won on the day 42–14.

The third annual RTR game was played on 5 February 2011, when South Sydney took on the Newtown Jets. The last time these two teams met was back in the 1983 NSWRFL season. The game was marked as Ben Ross' return to rugby league after a two-year neck injury. Ross captained the side, as South Sydney won their second straight RTR match, beating the Jets 10–4.

In 2012, South Sydney played the fourth annual RTR game against Super League club, the English club the Warrington Wolves on 28 January. Warrington took an early 24–0 lead, before Souths came back to 28–28. However, it wasn't enough as the Wolves scored the winning try through Gareth O'Brien. Warrington finished the game 34–28 over the Rabbitohs in front of a sold-out crowd. On the same day, the club opened "Souths On Chalmers" across the road from Redfern Oval (on Chalmers Street) - it is a restaurant and club

In 2013, South Sydney played the Papua New Guinea Residents XIII in their 5th annual RTR ON 9 February. Ben Lowe scored early on and new recruit Bryson Goodwin converted. In a shock ending to the first quarter, PNG's halfback scored twice to give PNG a 12–6 lead after 20 minutes. In the first hit up of the second quarter, Dave Tyrell was knocked down pretty hard but minutes later, he scored to draw the game back up until Rabbitohs captain Jason Clark scored minutes later to end the half 18–6. The 3rd quarter ended the way the second ended, with a Rabbitoh's try. Chris McQueen spun away from three tackles and plunged over. Although PNG's defence was proving tough, tries from Aaron Gray, Bennett Leslie and a second from Jason Clark ended the day with Rabbitoh's running away with it 38–12. Ben Te'o, Bryson Goodwin and several other recruits were presented with their 2013 jersey.

On 9 February 2014, South Sydney played the Canterbury-Bankstown Bulldogs in a match that was dubbed "Back to Belmore". In a classic encounter, the Rabbitohs ran out the victors winning 28 points to 20.

In 2015, the Rabbitohs were due to host the Canterbury-Bankstown Bulldogs in the return fixture from last year. However, with the Bulldogs qualifying for the World Club Series the meeting was rescheduled for 2016. The replacement team chosen was the current State Champions the Northern Pride from Cairns Queensland.

=== Match results ===
Winner	Score	Loser	Match Information
Winner	Score	Loser	Date	Venue & Crowd	Match
Wests Tigers	30–26	South Sydney Rabbitohs	5:15pm, Sunday, 8 February 2009	Redfern Oval (5,000)	Return To Redfern I
South Sydney Rabbitohs	42–14	Manly-Warringah Sea Eagles	6:00pm, Sunday, 7 February 2010	Redfern Oval (5,000)	Return To Redfern II
South Sydney Rabbitohs	10–4	Newtown Jets	6:00pm, Saturday, 5 February 2011	Redfern Oval (5,000)	Return To Redfern III
Warrington Wolves	34–28	South Sydney Rabbitohs	6:00pm, Saturday, 28 January 2012	Redfern Oval (5,000)	Return To Redfern IV
South Sydney Rabbitohs	38–12	Papua New Guinea Residents XIII	6:00pm, Saturday, 9 February 2013	Redfern Oval (5,000)	Return To Redfern V
The 2014 "Return To Redfern" Trial-Match was not played due to other trial commitments. The South Sydney Rabbitohs played against the Canterbury-Bankstown Bulldogs in the third Back To Belmore Trial-Match at the Belmore Sports Ground.
South Sydney Rabbitohs	20–20	Northern Pride	6:00pm, Saturday, 14 February 2015	Redfern Oval (2,000)	Return To Redfern VI
South Sydney Rabbitohs	8–28	Penrith Panthers	6:00pm, Saturday, 23 February 2019	Redfern Oval (4,111)	Return To Redfern VII
