= Jason Clark (rugby league) =

Australian rugby league footballer

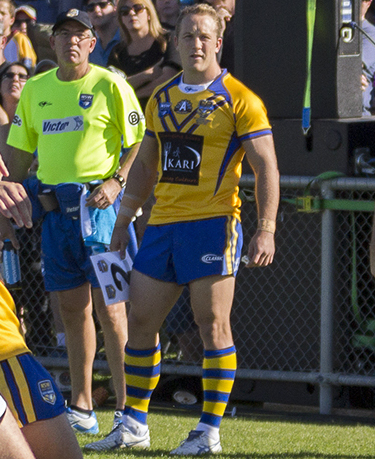

Personal information
- Born: 28 June 1989 (age 37) Sydney, New South Wales, Australia

Playing information
- Height: 6 ft 0 in (1.83 m)
- Weight: 16 st 3 lb (103 kg)
- Position: Loose forward
Club
Years	Team	Pld	T	G	FG	P
2009–18	South Sydney	172	11	1	0	46
2019–22	Warrington Wolves	84	3	1	0	14
2022–23	Limoux Grizzlies	16	0	0	0	0
	Total	272	14	2	0	60
Representative
Years	Team	Pld	T	G	FG	P
2013	NSW Residents	1	1	0	0	4
2015	NSW City	1	0	0	0	0

Jason Clark (born 28 June 1989) is an Australian former rugby league footballer who last played as a loose forward for the Limoux Grizzlies in the Elite One Championship.

He played for the South Sydney Rabbitohs in the National Rugby League (NRL), the Warrington Wolves in the Super League and played for NSW City in 2015.

== Background ==
Clark was born in Sydney, New South Wales, Australia.

== Playing career ==
=== Early career ===
Clark played his junior football for the Coogee Randwick Wombats, representing New South Wales at under-17 level. Prior to his NRL debut, he was Souths' Toyota Cup captain, scoring 20 tries in 47 NYC games for the South Sydney side.

=== 2008 ===
Clark played for South Sydney's NYC team as captain. He won the first Rabbitohs NYC Players Player award.

=== 2009 ===
In round 25 of the 2009 NRL season, Clark made his first grade debut for Souths (first grade player number 1072) in a 41-6 win over St. George Illawarra Dragons where he was a replacement, coming off of the bench at hooker.

=== 2010 ===
Clark played in 20 matches for Souths in the 2010 NRL season playing three games at lock, one game in the second row, and the rest from the bench.

=== 2011 ===
In round 18, Clark scored his first NRL try in Souths 36-22 loss against Manly. Clark played in 15 matches for Souths in the 2011 NRL season.

=== 2012 ===
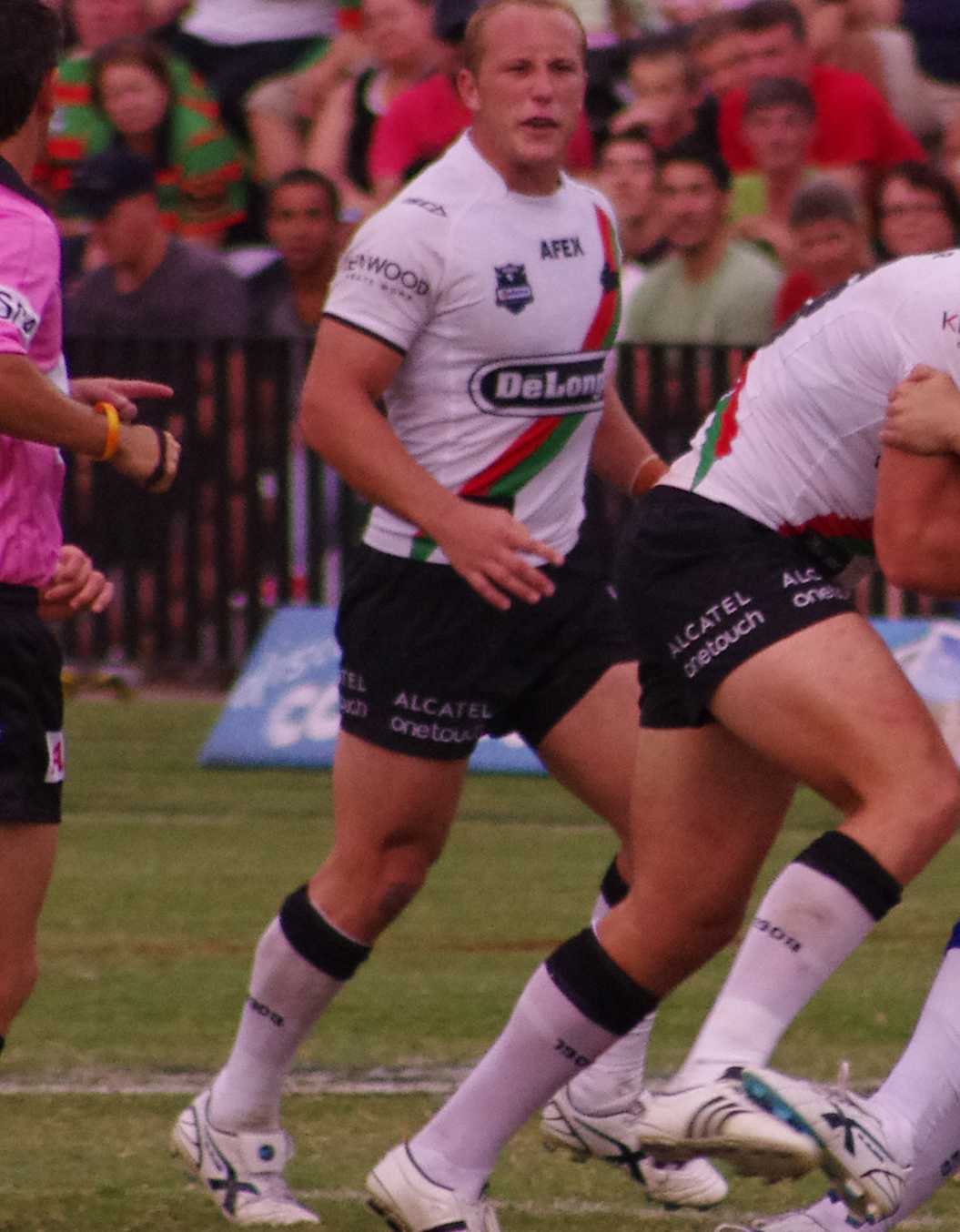
Clark playing for the Rabbitohs in 2012

In 2012, Clark went to play a total of 23 out of 25 matches for Souths and scored one try. This was Clark's first year of making it into the finals, however Souths were knocked out of the finals in the preliminary final against Canterbury-Bankstown.

=== 2013 ===
On 9 February 2013, Clark captained Souths in the 2013 "Return to Redfern" clash against Papua New Guinea. His team won 38-12, with Clark scoring a double.

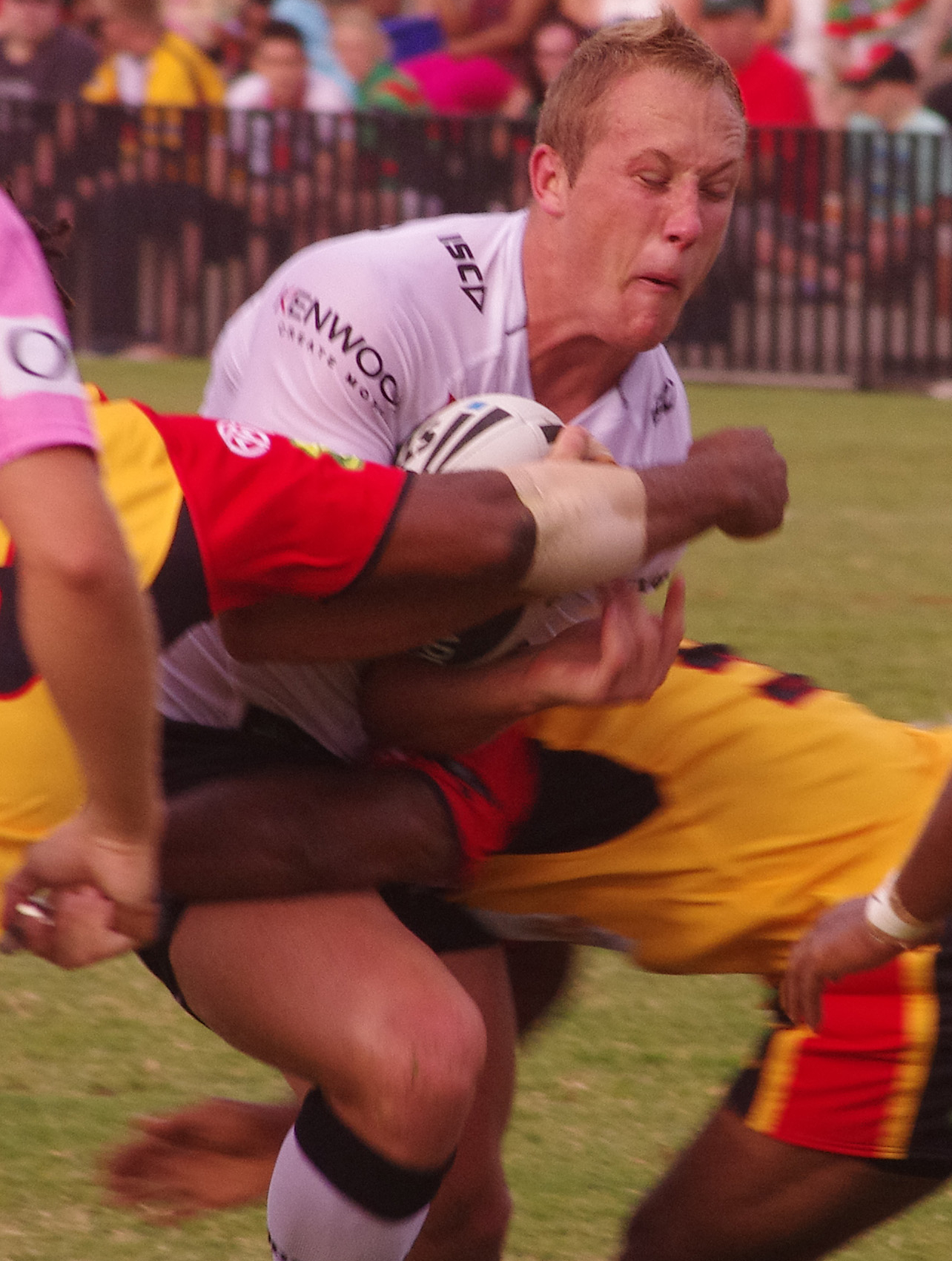
Clark playing for the South Sydney Rabbitohs in 2013

On 22 September 2013, Clark was named on the interchange bench in the 2013 New South Wales Cup Team of the Year. Clark only played 11 games for Souths in 2013 NRL season.

=== 2014 ===
Clark missed the first four weeks of the 2014 NRL season with an ankle injury. He scored a try on his return in round five, where Souths beat the Dragons 26-6, he then played all games excluding one in the lead up to Souths 21st Premiership. On 5 October 2014, in South Sydney's 2014 NRL Grand Final against the Canterbury-Bankstown Bulldogs, Clark played off the bench in Souths 30-6 victory.

=== 2015 ===
Clark was named to play in South Sydney's 2015 NRL Auckland Nines squad in jersey 11. Clark played in all of the games and scored Souths first try of the tournament; against the Penrith Panthers where he was awarded a 5-point try for scoring right under the posts. Clark played in the 2015 World Club Challenge where Souths beat St Helens 39-0. He was originally named to start at lock, however Ben Lowe started at lock and Clark moved onto the bench.

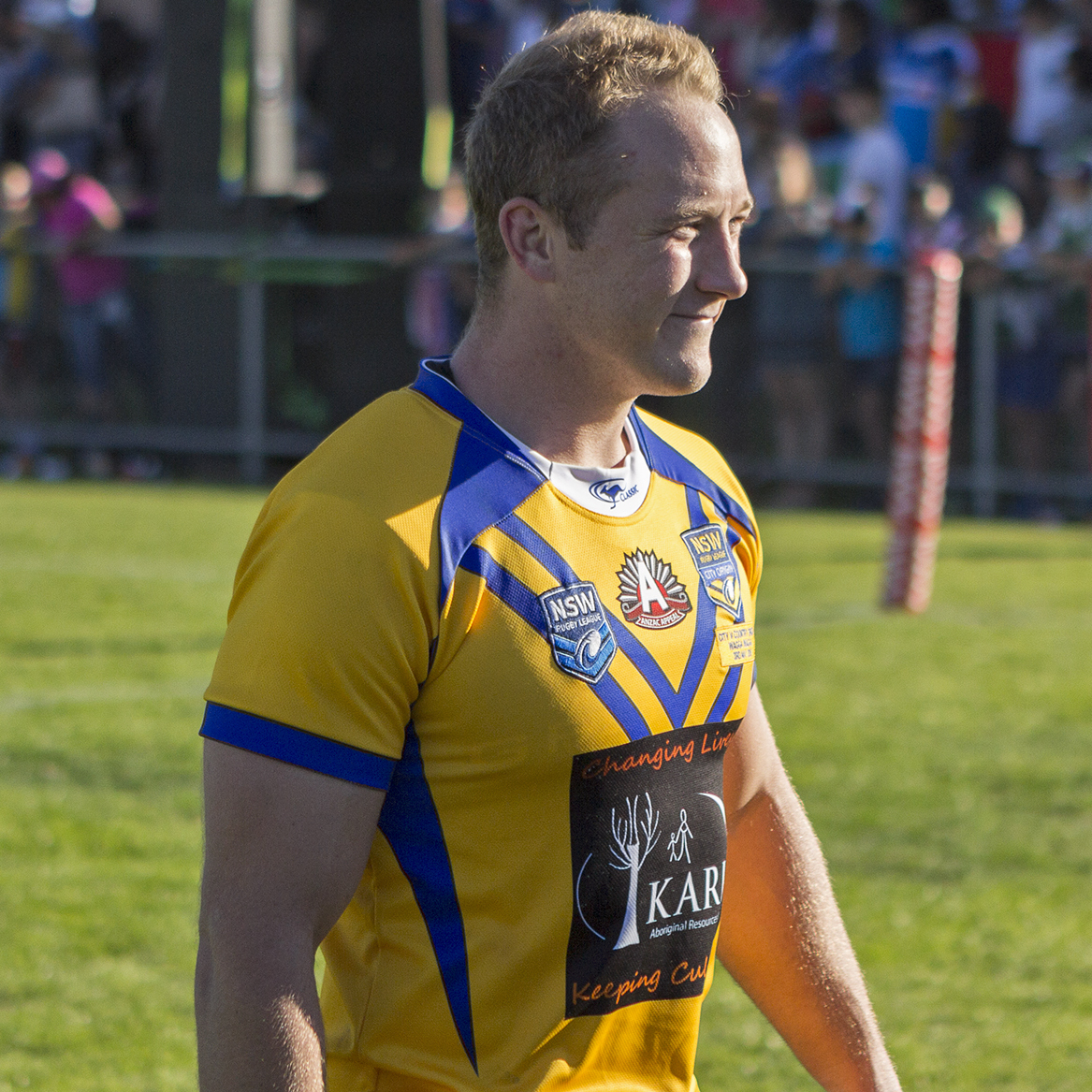
Clark playing for City in 2015

On 3 May 2015, Clark played for New South Wales City against New South Wales Country in the 2015 City vs Country Origin.

On 22 May 2015, Clark played his 100th NRL first-grade game for Souths against the Parramatta Eels. On 12 June 2015, Clark played his 150th grade game for South Sydney. This includes all of his NYC games and first grade games. Clark went to play 18 NRL games in 2015 for Souths, scoring two tries. Clark was awarded the Burrow Appreciation Award for 2015 at South Sydney's annual Red and Green Ball, an award awarded to a South Sydney player every year nominated by "the burrow", a Rabbitohs supporter group.

=== 2016 ===
Clark started the year representing South Sydney in their 2016 Auckland Nines team, playing all three of Souths' games.

On 18 August, Clark extended his contract with Souths until the end of the 2018 season.

At the conclusion of the 2016 NRL season, Clark along with Sam Burgess and Kyle Turner, played in 23 of Souths' 24 matches - the most matches by any player. Despite not scoring any tries in 2016, Clark finished 4th in the team in tackles (with 603) and was also second to last in missed tackles (by players who had played over 10 matches), with only 17.

=== 2017 ===
Clark made 15 appearances for Souths in the 2017 NRL season.

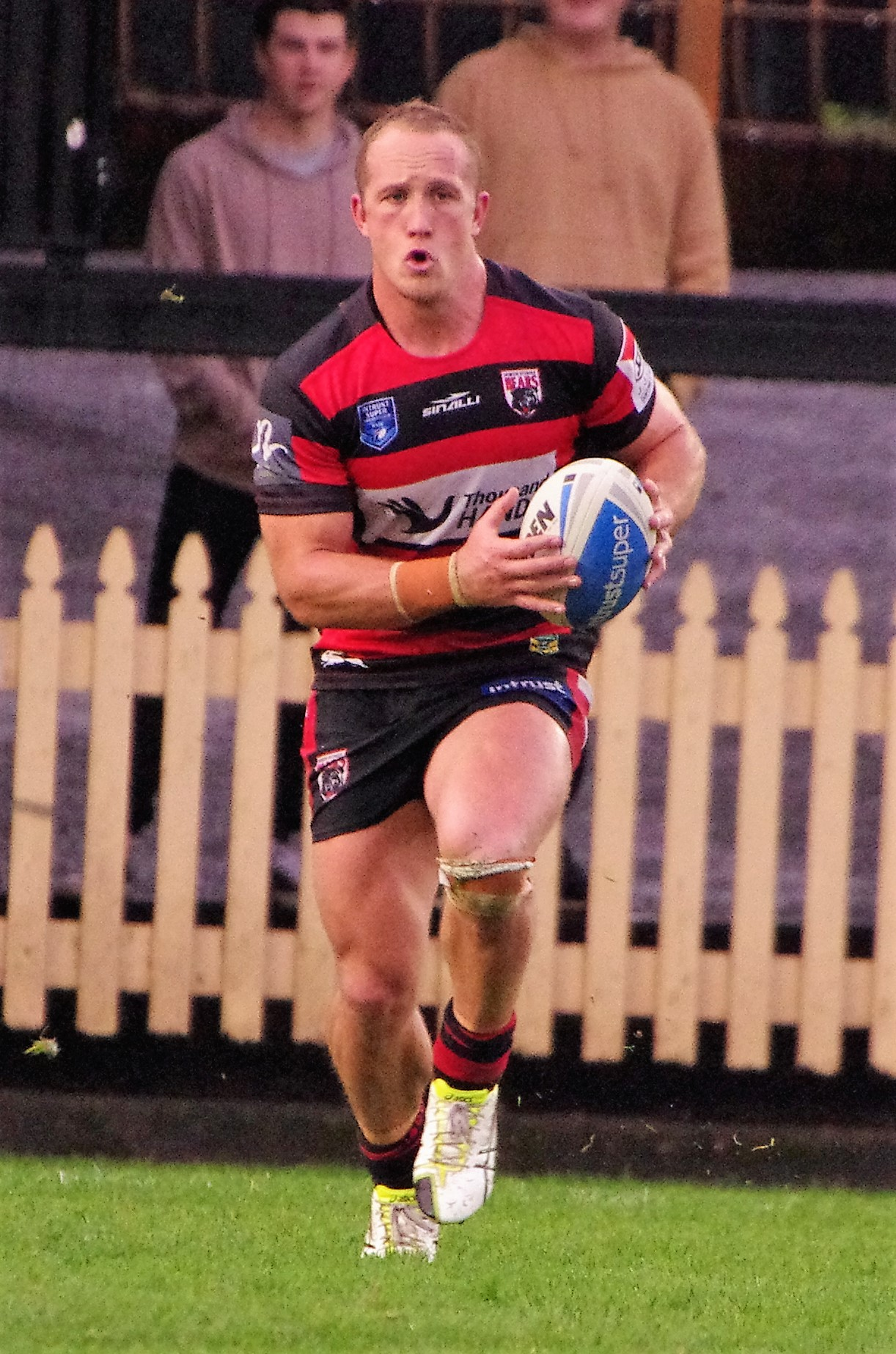
Clark playing for the North Sydney Bears in 2017

Later in the year he played four games for the North Sydney Bears but was recalled to The Souths team for the final game of the year against Parramatta.

=== 2018 ===
At the start of the 2018 NRL season, it was revealed that Souths management had told Clark his services would not be required for the 2019 NRL season and beyond.

This prompted Souths fans to start a petition demanding that Clark would be offered a new contract to stay at the club. The petition read “Jason was told by club officials that he is no longer in their plans beyond the 2018 NRL season. Jason plays every game with pure Rabbitohs heart and he's both fan and players favourite. We don't want to see this amazing player leave this club, he played a big part in our 2014 premiership winning series. We absolutely CANNOT see this great talent leave. Please sign and share this petition and hopefully get this message to club officials"

In June 2018, Clark signed a two-year deal to join English side Warrington. Clark was part of the Souths side that ended up finishing 3rd on the table at the end of the regular season. Clark's final game for Souths was the 13-12 elimination final victory over St George as the player picked up an injury in the match and was ruled out of the preliminary final game against the Sydney Roosters.

=== 2019 ===
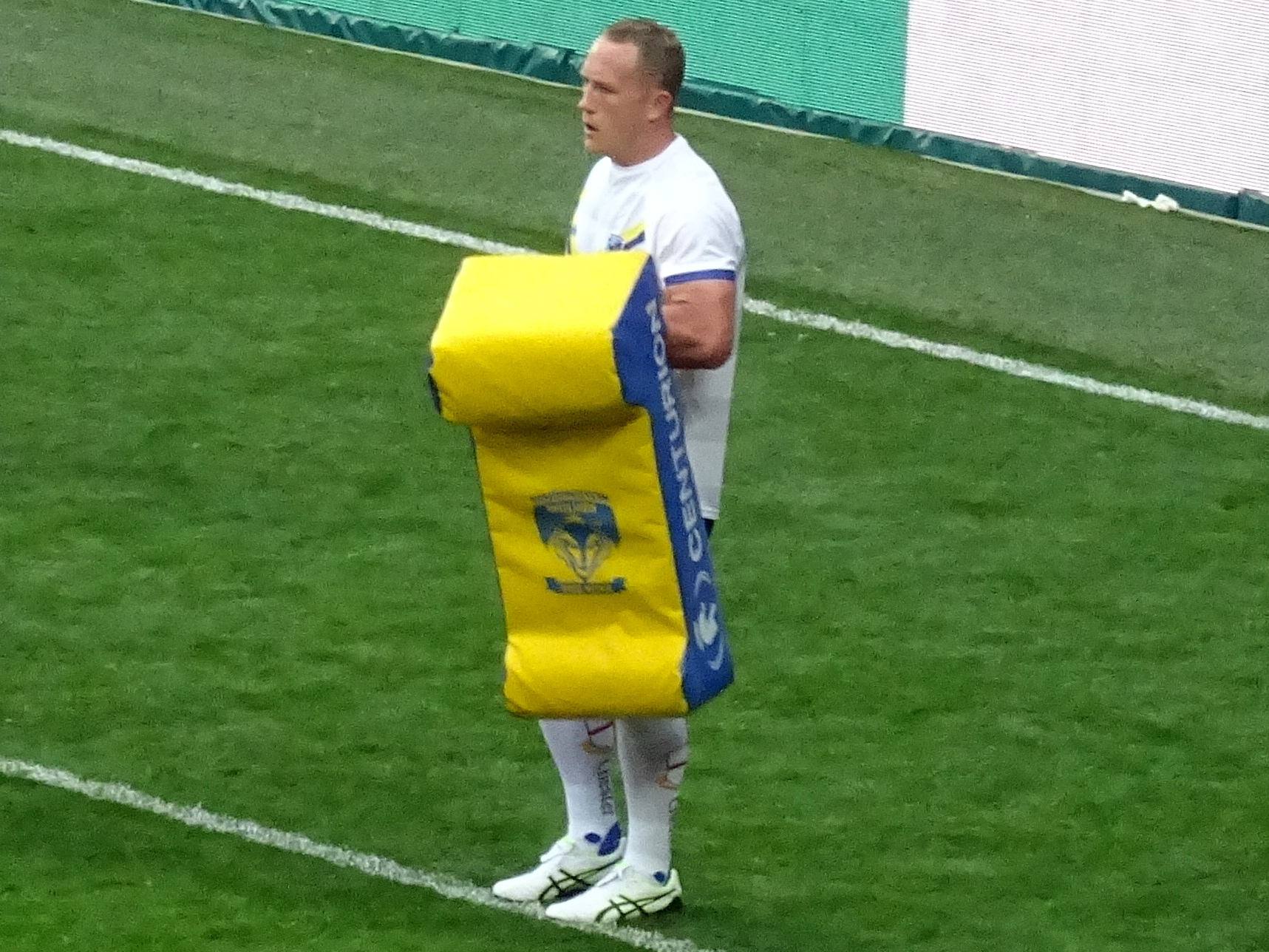
Clark warming up for the Warrington Wolves in 2019

He played in the 2019 Challenge Cup Final victory over St. Helens at Wembley Stadium.

=== 2023 ===
On 6 Jun 2023 he announced his retirement from professional rugby league.

== Personal life ==
Clark is an Australian Apprenticeships Ambassador for the Australian Government and an Apprentice Mentor in the NRL's Trade UP With The NRL Program.

Clark has three daughters - Milla, Andi and Billie.

== Statistics ==
=== NRL ===
†	Denotes seasons in which Clark won an NRL Premiership

Season	Team	Matches	T	G	GK %	F/G	Pts	W	L	D	W-L %
2009	South Sydney Rabbitohs	1	0	0	—	0	0	1	0	0	100
2010	South Sydney Rabbitohs	20	0	0	—	0	0	10	10	0	50.0
2011	South Sydney Rabbitohs	15	1	0	—	0	0	9	6	0	60.0
2012	South Sydney Rabbitohs	23	1	0	—	0	4	16	7	0	69.57
2013	South Sydney Rabbitohs	11	2	0	—	0	8	8	3	0	72.73
2014†	South Sydney Rabbitohs	22	2	0	—	0	8	17	5	0	77.27
2015	South Sydney Rabbitohs	18	2	0	—	0	8	8	10	0	44.4
2016	South Sydney Rabbitohs	23	0	0	—	0	0	9	14	0	39
2017	South Sydney Rabbitohs	15	0	0	—	0	0	6	9	0	40
2018	South Sydney Rabbitohs	21	1	1	100	0	6	14	7	0	66.67
2019	Warrington Wolves	32	2	0	__	)	8				
2020	Warrington Wolves	17									
2021	Warrington Wolves	17	1				4				
2022	Warrington Wolves	19		1							
2023	Limoux Grizzlies	16									
Career totals		272	10	2	100	0	60	98	71	0	57.99

=== NSW City Origin ===
†	Denotes seasons in which Clark won a game for New South Wales City Origin team

Season	Team	Matches	T	G	GK %	F/G	Pts	W	L	D	W-L %
2015	NSW City	1	0	0	—	0	0	0	1	0	0

== Records and achievements ==
- 2008 South Sydney NYC Players’ Player for the under 20s side award
- 2009 South Sydney NYC Players’ Player for the under 20s side award
- 2009 South Sydney NYC Best and Fairest award
- 2009 round 25 - club debut
- 2013 Selected for NSW Cup team of the year
- 2014 Won NRL Telstra Premiership Grand Final with Souths
- 2015 Won NRL Auckland Nines with Souths
- 2015 Won World Club Challenge with Souths
- 2015 Played for NSW City Origin
- 2015 Played 100 first grade games (all for South Sydney)
- 2015 Played 150 grade games for a club (all for South Sydney, Including NYC)
- 2015 Awarded South Sydney Burrow Appreciation Award
- 2016 Awarded South Sydney Bob McCarthy Clubman of the Year Award
