= Jaiman Lowe =

Australian rugby league footballer

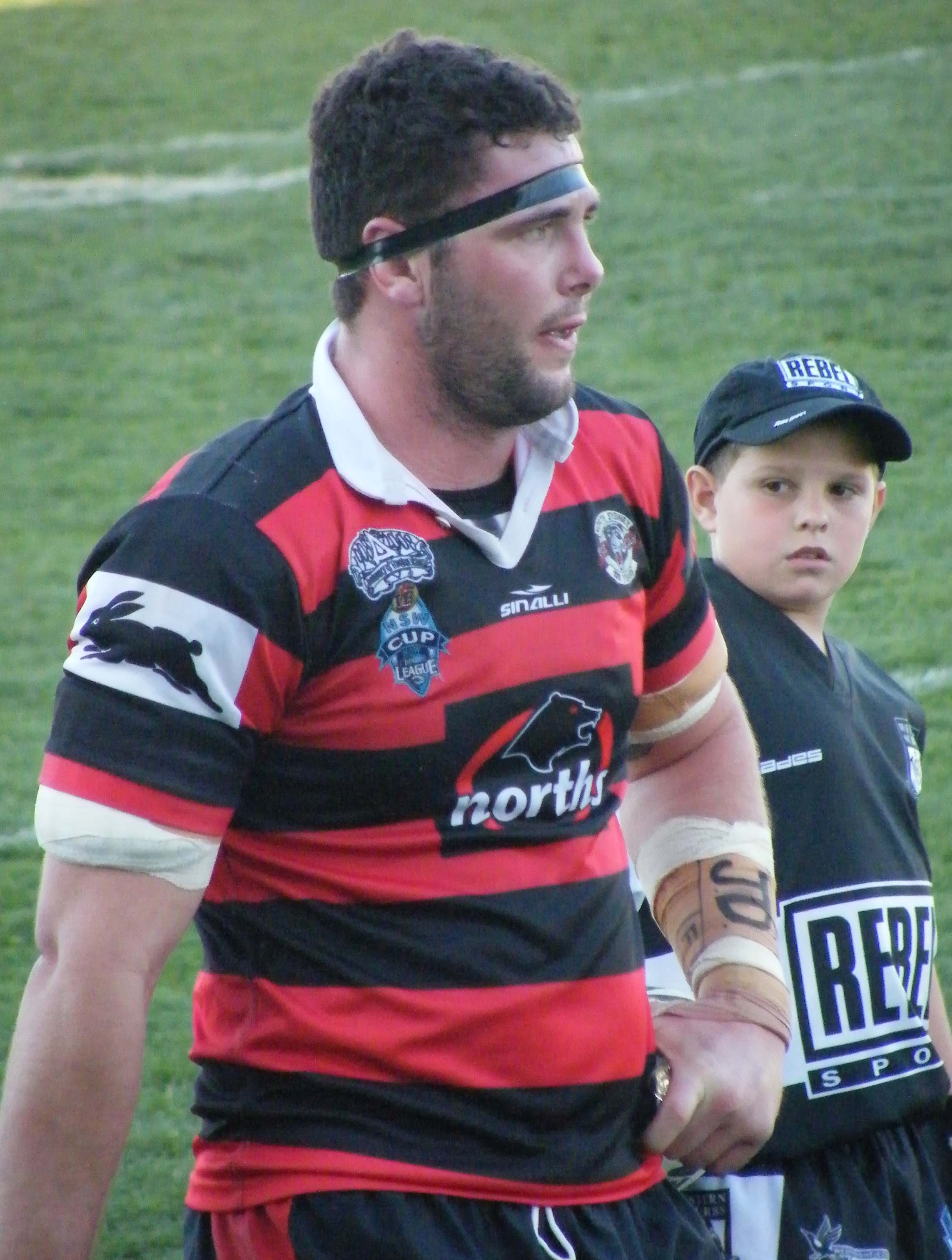

Personal information
- Born: 22 January 1983 (age 43) Toowoomba, Queensland, Australia

Playing information
- Height: 6 ft 4 in (1.92 m)
- Weight: 17 st 0 lb (108 kg)
- Position: Prop
Club
Years	Team	Pld	T	G	FG	P
2002–05	North Qld Cowboys	54	3	0	0	12
2006–10	South Sydney	50	2	0	0	8
2011–12	Melbourne Storm	38	1	0	0	4
	Total	142	6	0	0	24
- Education: St Mary's College, Toowoomba
- Relatives: Ben Lowe (brother)

Jaiman Lowe (born 22 January 1983 in Toowoomba, Queensland) is an Australian former professional rugby league footballer who last played for the Melbourne Storm in the National Rugby League (NRL). He has previously played for the North Queensland Cowboys and the South Sydney Rabbitohs. His usual position is at Prop Forward. Jaiman played alongside his younger brother, South Sydney forward Ben Lowe.

== Early life ==
Born in Toowoomba, Queensland Jaiman is the brother of Ben. He was educated at St Mary's College, Toowoomba

== Playing career ==
In 2002, Lowe made his first grade debut for the North Queensland Cowboys in a match against the South Sydney Rabbitohs. In 2006, he signed and played with South Sydney until he was released from contract in 2009. In round 11 of the 2007 NRL season, Lowe was sent off for king hitting Gold Coast player Brett Delaney during South Sydney's 25-18 loss. It was alleged prior to the incident that Delaney had grabbed Lowe by the testicles during the previous tackle. Lowe was later suspended for four games.

At the start of 2010 he joined the Queensland Cup side Northern Pride RLFC, but was re-signed mid-season to the South Sydney Rabbitohs to replace Ben Ross, who was ruled out of the season due to a neck injury. Along with his playing time for Souths, Lowe also played 27 matches for North Sydney in the NSW Cup.

Lowe signed with the Melbourne Storm for the 2011 NRL season. He played interchange in Storm's 2012 Premiership win over Canterbury-Bankstown. Lowe retired at the end of the 2012 season.

== Post playing ==
In 2022, Lowe was defeated by Sio Siua Taukeiaho in a boxing match. In 2023, Lowe played in the Cowboys Old Boys match.

== Achievements and accolades ==
=== Team ===
- 2012 NRL Grand Final: Melbourne Storm – Winners

== Statistics ==
Year	Team	Games	Tries	Pts
2002	North Queensland Cowboys	16		
2003	North Queensland Cowboys	24	2	8
2004	North Queensland Cowboys	6		
2005	North Queensland Cowboys	8	1	4
2006	South Sydney Rabbitohs	17	1	4
2007	South Sydney Rabbitohs	10		
2008	South Sydney Rabbitohs	3		
2009	South Sydney Rabbitohs	14		
2010	South Sydney Rabbitohs	6	1	4
2011	Melbourne Storm	23		
2012	Melbourne Storm	15	1	4
	Totals	142	6	24
