= Beau Scott =

Australian rugby league footballer

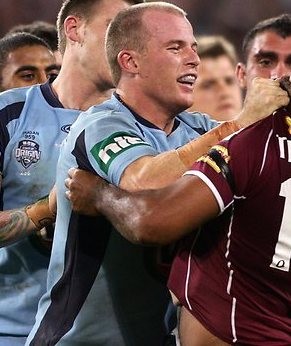

Personal information
- Born: 15 May 1984 (age 42) Camden, New South Wales, Australia

Playing information
- Height: 185 cm (6 ft 1 in)
- Weight: 99 kg (15 st 8 lb)
- Position: Second-row, Centre, Lock
Club
Years	Team	Pld	T	G	FG	P
2005–06	Cronulla Sharks	28	7	0	0	28
2007–12	St. George Illawarra	119	13	0	0	52
2013–15	Newcastle Knights	54	9	0	0	36
2016–18	Parramatta Eels	44	3	0	0	12
	Total	245	32	0	0	128
Representative
Years	Team	Pld	T	G	FG	P
2009–14	NSW Country	3	0	0	0	0
2010–15	New South Wales	11	1	0	0	4
2011–14	Australia	3	1	0	0	4
2014	Prime Minister's XIII	1	1	0	0	4
2015	NRL All Stars	1	0	0	0	0

Beau Scott (born 15 May 1984) is an Australian former professional rugby league footballer who played in the 2000s and 2010s in the National Rugby League (NRL). An Australia international and New South Wales State of Origin representative second-row, he could also play centre and lock. He played for the Cronulla-Sutherland Sharks, St. George Illawarra Dragons (with whom he won the 2010 NRL Premiership), the Newcastle Knights and the Parramatta Eels.

== Background ==
Scott was born in Camden, New South Wales, Australia.

He played his junior football for the Picton Magpies before being signed by the St. George Illawarra Dragons. He played for the Dragons' lower grade teams before being signed by the Cronulla-Sutherland Sharks. He played for the Sharks' Premier League reserve-grade team in 2006.

== Professional playing career ==
=== Cronulla-Sutherland Sharks ===
In Round 22 of the 2005 NRL season Scott made NRL debut for the Sharks against the Melbourne Storm. He scored on debut and was reported for contrary conduct against Cameron Smith, though he would be found not guilty at the tribunal the following week. He played 5 games that year before becoming a regular starter in 2006.

=== St. George Illawarra Dragons ===
In 2007, Scott joined the St. George Illawarra Dragons. In 2009, he played for Country in the City vs Country match due to an injury to another player. Scott was ruled out for the 2010 match after being named as 18th man for Australia. He was selected for New South Wales in Game 2 of the 2010 State of Origin series. His debut was subject to media-wide publicity, as he was the subject of a racial controversy involving their assistant coach Andrew Johns. Johns had allegedly made a racial comment in reference to Queensland centre Greg Inglis, while talking to Scott about tackling him, which triggered teammate Timana Tahu's exit from the New South Wales camp. Scott also played in Game 3. He played in the Dragons' 2010 NRL Grand Final-winning team defeating the Sydney Roosters, starting in the second-row. He also played in the 2011 World Club Challenge-winning team against the Wigan Warriors. In 2011, Scott was selected as 18th man for Australia in the 2011 ANZAC Test to play New Zealand. He was selected for 2 games of the 2011 State of Origin series. Scott made his debut for the Kangaroos in November against Wales in the 2011 Four Nations tournament. On 9 March 2012, Scott signed a four-year contract with the Newcastle Knights starting in 2013 to rejoin former Dragons coach Wayne Bennett. He played in Game 3 of the 2012 State of Origin series after Glenn Stewart was ruled out. Scott played 118 games over six seasons with St. George Illawarra between 2007–2012.

=== Newcastle Knights ===
Scott commenced playing for the Newcastle Knights in the 2013 NRL season. On 6 August 2014, Scott extended his contract with the Knights from the end of 2016 to the end of 2017.

Scott played in the 2014 Four Nations. He scored his sole international try against New Zealand in Round 1.

On 13 February 2015, Scott captained the NRL All Stars against the Indigenous All Stars in the 2015 All Stars match.

In April 2015, Scott asked for a release from the final two years of his Knights contract on compassionate grounds, due to his son requiring medical assistance that he could receive at the Children's Hospital in Westmead. On 20 April, he was officially released.

=== Parramatta Eels ===
On 20 April 2015, Scott signed a three-year contract with the Parramatta Eels starting in 2016. In Round 1, he made his club debut for the Eels in the season opening match against the Brisbane Broncos, playing at second-row in the Eels' 17-4 loss. In round 6, he scored his first try for the Eels, against the Canberra Raiders. At the end of the 2016 NRL season, Scott played 20 games and scored 2 tries.

On 20 June 2017, it was announced that Scott would be ruled out for the season with a bicep injury. On 1 September 2017, Scott made a shock return to the Parramatta side to play against South Sydney, it was initially thought he would be out for the rest of the season. On 18 May 2018, Scott suffered a serious knee injury in Parramatta's 24-12 loss to New Zealand. Scans confirmed that Scott had ruptured his left anterior cruciate ligament, ruling him out for the remainder of the season. On 27 June 2018, Scott announced his retirement from rugby league. He spoke to the media saying "I feel privileged to have played the great game of rugby league professionally for the past 14 years and I'm grateful for the opportunities and experiences that have come with it, I would like to thank all of the players, coaches and support staff who I have been associated with throughout my career and I'd like to acknowledge and thank all the fans and members who have supported me over such a long period".
