= 2015 All Stars match =

Australian rugby league match

2015 All Stars Game
Indigenous All Stars	NRL All Stars
20	6
	1	2	3	4	Total
IND	0	0	6	14	20
NRL	0	6	0	0	6
- Date: 13 February 2015
- Stadium: Cbus Super Stadium
- Location: Robina, Queensland
- Preston Campbell Medal: George Rose
- Advance Australia Fair: Christine Anu
- Referees: Gerard Sutton, Grant Atkins
- Attendance: 23,177

Broadcast partners
- Broadcasters: Nine Network
- Commentators: Tim Gilbert; Phil Gould; Andrew Johns; Wally Lewis

The 2015 All Stars Match was the fifth annual representative exhibition match played between the Indigenous All Stars and the NRL All Stars on the Gold Coast, Queensland, Australia. It was held on 13 February 2015, returning from a one-year hiatus.

The Indigenous side was selected through public voting which lasted from 1 December 2014 through to 9 January 2015. The NRL side wasn't voted on by the public, as in previous games, but selected by the team's coach, Wayne Bennett. Both sides were officially announced on 19 January.

Preceding games included a touch football game between an Indigenous and Australian sides which featured rugby league legend Scott Prince, won 5-4 by the Indigenous team, a QLD Under 16s Indigenous All Stars vs. NSW Under 16s Indigenous All Stars game, drawn 24-24 and the Women's All Stars exhibition match which was won by the NRL Women's All Stars 26-8.

== Teams ==
INDIGENOUS ALL STARS	Position	NRL ALL STARS
Greg Inglis	Fullback	Matt Moylan
Alex Johnston	Wing	Manu Vatuvei
Will Chambers	Centre	Jarrod Croker
Justin Hodges	Centre	Dylan Walker
Josh Hoffman	Wing	Antonio Winterstein
Ben Barba	Five-eighth	Kieran Foran
Johnathan Thurston (c)	Halfback	Mitchell Pearce
George Rose	Prop	James Graham
Ray Thompson	Hooker	Nathan Friend^{3}
Ryan James	Prop	Jared Waerea-Hargreaves
Tyrone Peachey	2nd Row	Beau Scott (c)
Kyle Turner	2nd Row	Jason Taumalolo
Chris Grevsmuhl^{4}	Lock	Paul Gallen
Tyrone Roberts^{1}	Interchange	Jesse Bromwich
David Fifita^{5}	Interchange	Luke Brooks
Dane Gagai	Interchange	Joseph Paulo^{2}
Tyson Andrews^{6}	Interchange	Trent Merrin
Jack Wighton	Interchange	Corey Parker
Kierran Moseley	Interchange	Jeremy Smith
Brad Tighe	Interchange	Dave Taylor
Laurie Daley	Coach	Wayne Bennett

^{1} - Chris Sandow was originally selected to play but withdrew due to injury. He was replaced by Tyrone Roberts.
^{2} - Will Hopoate was originally selected to play but withdrew due to injury. He was replaced by Joseph Paulo.
^{3} - Michael Ennis was originally selected to play but withdrew due to injury. He was replaced by Nathan Friend.
^{4} - Tom Learoyd-Lahrs was originally selected to play but withdrew due to injury. He was replaced by Chris Grevsmuhl.
^{5} - Greg Bird was originally selected to play but withdrew due to injury. Chris Grevsmuhl was promoted to the starting lineup as a result and Bird was replaced by David Fifita.
^{6} - Sam Thaiday was originally selected to play but withdrew due to injury. Kyle Turner was promoted to the starting lineup as a result and Thaiday was replaced by Tyson Andrews.

== Result ==
13 February 2015
8:00pm (AEST)

Indigenous All Stars	20 – 6	NRL All Stars
Tries: Greg Inglis (51') 1 Will Chambers (64') 1 Chris Grevsmuhl (78') 1 Goals: Johnathan Thurston 4/4 (53', 66', 75' pen, 79')	1st: 0 - 0; 2nd: 0 - 6; 3rd: 6 - 0; 4th: 14 - 0	Tries: Dylan Walker (29') 1 Goals: Jarrod Croker 1/1 (30')

Cbus Super Stadium
Gold Coast, Queensland
Attendance: 23,177
Preston Campbell Medal: George Rose
Referee: Gerard Sutton, Grant Atkins

== Women's All Stars match ==
2015 Women All Stars match
Indigenous Women All Stars	Women All Stars
8	26
	1	Total
IND	4	8
WAS	14	26
- Date: 13 February 2015
- Stadium: Cbus Super Stadium
- Location: Robina, Queensland
- Woman of the Match: Kezie Apps
- Advance Australia Fair: TBA

Broadcast partners

The NRL announced the Women's and Indigenous Women's All Stars teams to take the field as part of the Harvey Norman Rugby League All Stars match on Saturday 13 February in Brisbane. This will be the fourth Women's rugby league match for the women as part of the fixture, with the level of competition stepping up again next year, thanks to increased women's pathways nationally and female participation levels across the game at an all-time high.

=== Women's Teams ===
INDIGENOUS WOMEN ALL STARS	Position	WOMEN ALL STARS
Mahalia Murphy	Fullback	Sam Hammond
Latoya Billy	Wing	Karina Brown
Amber Pilley	Centre	Annette Brander
Tallisha Harden	Centre	Emily Andrews
Nakia Welsh Davis	Wing	Kellye Hodges
Casey Karklis	Five-eighth	Ali Brigginshaw
Jasmine Allende	Halfback	Courtney Lockwood
Chloe Caldwell	Prop	Steph Hancock
Caitlin Moran	Hooker	Brittany Breayley
Carly Phillips	Prop	Heather Ballinger
Emma-Marie Young	2nd Row	Kezie Apps
Litisha Boney	2nd Row	Ruan Sims
Lavina Phillips	Lock	Nikki Richards
Molly O'Connell	Interchange	Sarah Walker
Ash Singleton	Interchange	Alex Sulisi
Jess Shaw	Interchange	Simaima Taufa (Maima)
Shaylin Williams	Interchange	Deanna Turner
Jenni-Sue Hoepper	Interchange	Oneata Schwalger
	Coach

The Women's All Stars exhibition match which was held as a curtain raiser for the men's 2015 All Stars match and was won by the NRL Women's All Stars 26-8.

13 February 2015

Indigenous All Stars	8 – 26	NRL All-Stars
Tries: 2 Latoya Billy 2 Goals: nil	Report	Tries: 5; 2 Kezie Apps; Kellye Hodges; Ali Brigginshaw; Annette Brander; Goals: 3; 2 Ali Brigginshaw; Steph Hancock

Cbus Super Stadium, Robina
Attendance: 23,177
Player of the Match: Kezie Apps
