= Ed Murphy (rugby league) =

Australian rugby league footballer (born 1992)

Ed “Deadly” Murphy
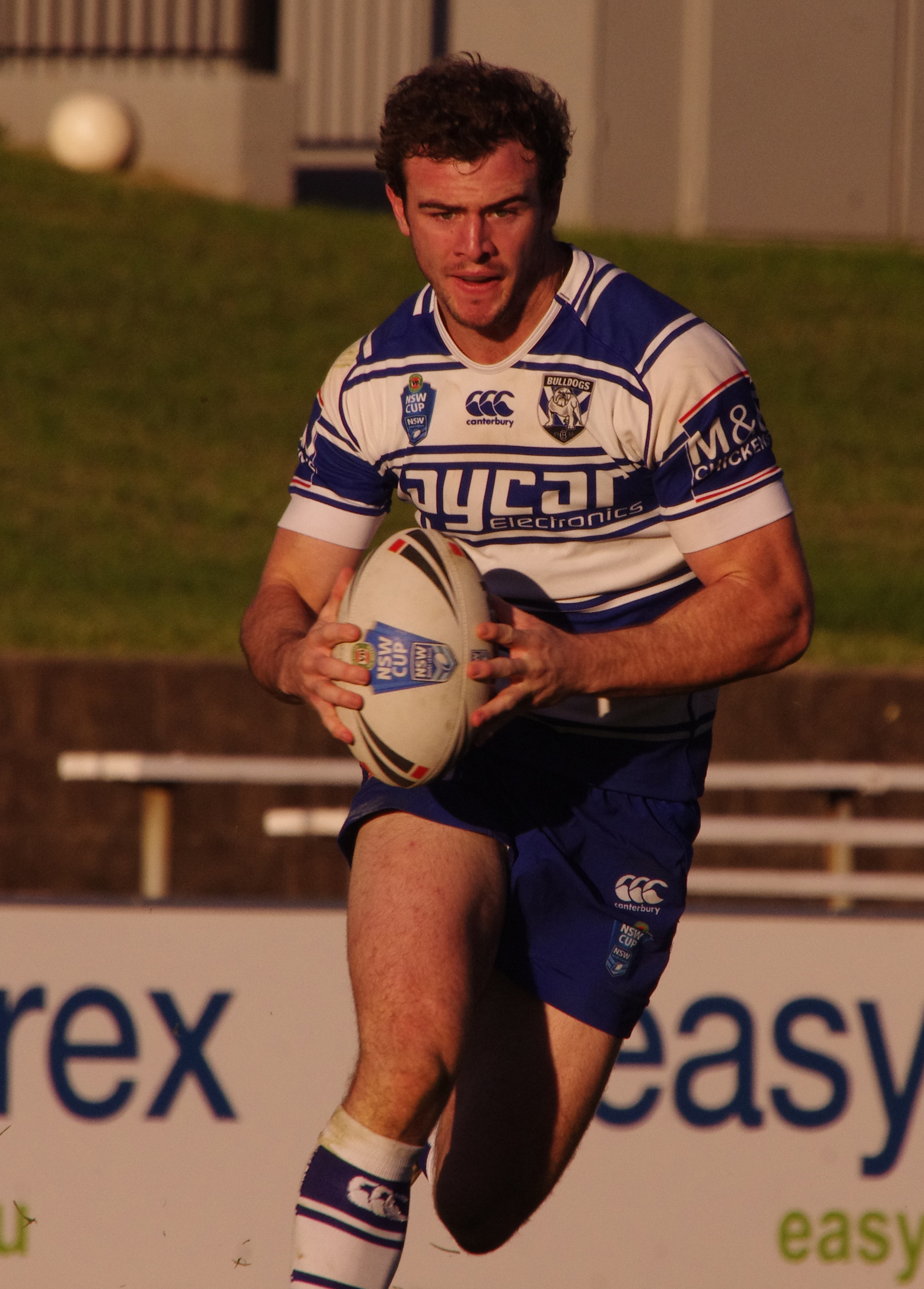
- Murphy in 2014

Personal information
- Full name: Edward Murphy
- Born: 22 October 1992 (age 34) Sydney, New South Wales, Australia
- Height: 181 cm (5 ft 11 in)
- Weight: 93 kg (14 st 9 lb)

Playing information
- Position: Centre, Wing
Club
Years	Team	Pld	T	G	FG	P
2016–17	South Sydney	2	0	0	0	0
2019	Limoux Grizzlies	2	0	0	0	0
	Total	4	0	0	0	0
- Source: As of 3 March 2018

Ed Murphy (born 22 October 1992) is an Australian professional rugby league footballer last played as a centre or winger for the Limoux Grizzlies in the Elite One Championship.

== Early life ==
Murphy was born in Sydney, New South Wales, Australia and grew up in Mungindi.

He played his junior rugby league for the Mungindi Grasshoppers. He was then signed by the Canterbury-Bankstown Bulldogs.

== Playing career ==
=== Early career ===
In 2011 and 2012, Murphy played for the Canterbury-Bankstown Bulldogs' NYC team. On 21 April 2012, he played for the New South Wales under-20s team against the Queensland under-20s team in the inaugural under-20s State of Origin match. In 2013, he graduated to Canterbury's New South Wales Cup team. In 2015, he joined the South Sydney Rabbitohs and played with their New South Wales Cup team, North Sydney Bears.

=== 2016 ===
In Round 16 of the 2016 NRL season, Murphy made his NRL debut for South Sydney against the Penrith Panthers.

=== 2017 ===
For the 2017 Intrust Super Premiership NSW season, Murphy was named Captain of the North Sydney side. On 28 August, he was named at centre in the Intrust Super Premiership NSW Team of the Year.

=== 2018 ===
After leaving North Sydney at the end of 2017, Murphy signed a contract with Canberra Raiders feeder club Mounties in hopes of gaining an NRL contract and playing first grade rugby league. On 10 March, he scored a try in his debut game for Mounties in their 22-20 opening round victory over St. George Illawarra. Murphy failed to break into first grade for Canberra but was selected in the NSW residents side to play against the Queensland residents.

On 12 December, it was revealed that Murphy had returned to North Sydney after signing a one-year deal.

=== 2019 ===
Murphy made 18 appearances for Norths in the 2019 Canterbury Cup NSW season as the club finished third on the table and qualified for the finals.

On 7 August, it was revealed that Murphy had signed a contract to join the Limoux Grizzlies in the Elite One Championship.

Murphy played in the club's finals campaign in which they lost the qualifying final against South Sydney. Murphy did not play in the elimination final the following week against Newtown which Norths lost 30-28 at Leichhardt Oval.
