= 2012 State of Origin series =

Australian rugby league series

- Won by: Queensland (17th title)
- Series margin: 2-1
- Points scored: 97
- Attendance: 191,569 (ave. 63,856 per match)
- Player of the series: Nate Myles
- Top points scorer(s): Johnathan Thurston – 22
- Top try scorer(s): Darius Boyd; Brett Stewart; Both 3

The 2012 State of Origin series was the 31st time the annual best-of-three series between the Queensland and New South Wales rugby league teams was played entirely under 'state of origin' rules. For the fourth successive year a Queensland victory set a new record for consecutive State of Origin titles, reaching seven. Game I was played at Melbourne's sold out Etihad Stadium and won by Queensland; its television broadcast watched by more than 2.5 million viewers, rating it as the most-watched State of Origin broadcast since the introduction of OzTAM ratings in 1999. New South Wales' series-equalling win in Game II, played at Sydney's sold out ANZ Stadium, set a new TV ratings record for most-watched second game of any series in State of Origin history. The decider, Game III was played at Brisbane's Suncorp Stadium and was won by Queensland. This game set a new record for the highest television audience in Australia for a rugby league match since the introduction of the OzTam ratings system in 2001.

In 2012, the first year of the independent Australian Rugby League Commission, a new rule was put into place that would set out earlier in a player's career which was his state of origin. For the second successive year, Queensland hosted Game III and New South Wales hosted Game II; typically the states would alternate the hosting of these games.

Ricky Stuart stepped down as New South Wales head coach after the series in August, shortly after signing a contract to coach the Parramatta Eels from 2013 onwards. Later in the year New South Wales' player of the series was named: hooker Robbie Farah.

2012 also saw the inaugural Under 20s State of Origin match which was played at Centerbet Stadium, with New South Wales taking out the Darren Lockyer Shield against Queensland.

== Game I ==
The opening game for the New South Wales Blues saw Todd Carney, James Tamou, Tony Williams and Jamie Buhrer make their debuts, with all either having previous international representative or grand final experience. Michael Jennings was the first Origin player in 29 years to be selected to the squad after playing in the reserve grades, where he was dropped from the Penrith Panthers for one game due to poor off-field discipline. Jamie Buhrer from the Manly Sea Eagles was generally the shock selection in the squad, only playing for City Origin earlier in the year as his sole representative honour and was yet to play 50 games for his club, but was selected due to his big game experience, having played in Manly's winning 2011 NRL Grand Final team, and his high utility value to replace their recognised utility in Kurt Gidley who was unable to play in the 2012 series to due a season-long injury. Only 9 of the selected 17 players were incumbent from Game Three in 2011.

Queensland's selected side for the first game was largely unchanged from the 2011 series, with only four changes made. Their only debutant was Matt Gillett from the Brisbane Broncos to play a utility role from the bench. It was hooker Cameron Smith's first match and series as the permanent captain for his state, having previously filled in for the role only in Darren Lockyer's absence.

Wednesday, 23 May 2012
20:00

New South Wales
Tries
Uate (6') 1
Jennings (43') 1
Goals
Carney 1/3
(44')
10 – 18
report

Game details

Queensland
Tries
2 (27', 40') Boyd
1 (73') Inglis
Goals
3/3 Thurston
(28' ,40' ,74')

Etihad Stadium, Melbourne
Attendance: 56,021
Referee: Ben Cummins, Matt Cecchin
Player of the Match: Nate Myles (Queensland)

1st half

New South Wales held most of the momentum early in the match, and scored first through winger Akuila Uate in the sixth minute of the match, who recovered a bomb kick and scored in the corner; Todd Carney missed the conversion and New South Wales led 4–0. In the twenty-first minute, a brawl erupted; Blues centre Michael Jennings, who ran some distance to leap into the brawl and punch Brent Tate in the head, was sent to the sin bin for ten minutes. The Maroons scored shortly afterwards, with winger Darius Boyd touching down in the corner and Johnathan Thurston converting to give Queensland a 6–4 lead. Boyd scored again in the thirty-eighth minute, and another successful conversion from Thurston gave Queensland a 12–4 lead at halftime.

2nd half

New South Wales added points early in the second half, with Jennings scoring a try from a bomb kick; Carney's successful conversion brought the score to 12–10. New South Wales had most of the attack during the second half, but Queensland was able to defend its goal-line and prevent the Blues from scoring; and in the fifty-second minute, Carney narrowly missed a long-range penalty goal attempt which would have levelled the scores at twelve apiece, but after seventy minutes, Queensland still led 12–10. After a repeat set of six in the seventy-third minute, Maroons' centre Greg Inglis crossed the line in controversial circumstances: after recovering the ball from a cross-field kick, Inglis lost control of the ball when it contacted the boot of Blues' hooker Robbie Farah, before regathering and grounding in goal. After a lengthy review, the video referee awarded a try: he ruled that Farah had intentionally played at and kicked the ball out of Inglis' hands, and that Inglis' loss of control was therefore not a knock-on. The try was converted, and there was no further score, giving Queensland 18–10 victory. The decision to award the try to Inglis was highly controversial. Blues captain Paul Gallen argued vehemently with the referee onfield following the decision, although was more circumspect after the match. Inglis' controversial try saw him pass Dale Shearer to become the all-time leading try scorer in State of Origin football. Michael Jennings received a one-match suspension for the punch for which he was sin-binned during the match. It was Queensland's fourth Game One victory in a row, the first time either team had achieved the feat.

After the controversial Inglis try call, and others during the game, New South Wales coach Ricky Stuart asked his players not to give interviews to media in the lead-up to Game II, although the ban was lifted after two days. The decision was officially endorsed by referees' coach Bill Harrigan the following day.

== Game II ==
The two players to enter the New South Wales squad for the second game of the series were Anthony Watmough and Tim Grant, with Grant making his debut. Grant was included to partner James Tamou as starting props, with captain Paul Gallen moved back to his preferred position at lock and Greg Bird subsequently shifted to second row with Luke Lewis to the bench to replace Jamie Buhrer. Watmough replaces Tony Williams who was not selected due to a sustained injury. The announced Queensland side remained unchanged, however afterwards Sam Thaiday was forced to withdraw due to injury and was replaced by David Taylor, allowing Corey Parker to enter the squad.

Wednesday, 13 June 2012
20:00

New South Wales
Tries
B Stewart (26', 45') 2
J.Morris (48') 1
Goals
Carney 2/4
(43', 46')
16 – 12
Report

Game details

Queensland
Tries
1 (40') Hannant
1 (62') Inglis
Goals
2/2 Thurston
(40', 63')

ANZ Stadium, Sydney
Attendance: 83,110
Referee: Tony Archer, Ben Cummins
Player of the Match: Greg Bird

1st half

Game 2 saw a very physical contest between the two sides. New South Wales dominated possession, and Brett Stewart scored the first try of the game in the corner after around 25 minutes, giving New South Wales a 4–0 lead. A late converted try by Ben Hannant after a bomb kick was misread by the New South Wales backline saw Queensland lead 6–4 at half-time.

2nd half

Two minutes into the second half, Cooper Cronk was sin-binned for a professional foul which denied Todd Carney the opportunity to score under the posts from a grubber kick; Carney converted a penalty goal to level the scores at 6–6. Billy Slater and Corey Parker then suffered game-changing injuries as the Maroons struggled to keep up with the Blues' pace. New South Wales scored two quick tries during Cronk's period in the sin bin, with both Brett Stewart scoring a 50-metre try following a break by Carney, and Josh Morris scoring after a break by Jarryd Hayne. Johnathan Thurston had stripped Hayne of the ball which travelled forward, Morris picked the ball up and out paced Greg Inglis in a 40-metre sprint to score; this gave New South Wales a 16–6 lead. From there, Queensland began to have the better of possession, and won several repeat sets from goal-line dropouts. Greg Inglis scored a try in the 62nd minute, the conversion bringing the score back to 16–12. Brent Tate almost scored a try in the 70th minute, but Michael Jennings knocked the ball out of his grasp in the in-goal area to save the try. There were no further points in the game, and New South Wales won the game 16–12, to level the series.

== Game III ==
Injury concerns to both squads forced their respective coaches to name extended squads for the decider. Glenn Stewart was the main injury concern for New South Wales, as was Billy Slater likewise for Queensland. Both players were not available for the game. For NSW, Beau Scott replaced the injured Stewart whilst Brett Morris was chosen over Akuila Uate and Tony Williams returned replacing Trent Merrin.

Greg Inglis was selected to replace Slater, although Matthew Bowen and Darius Boyd were also considered as replacements. Inglis's centre spot was filled by Dane Nielson whilst Corey Parker took Ashley Harrison's lock position, as Harrison was ruled out from injury. Sam Thaiday returned to the run-on squad and Ben Te'o was considered over David Taylor on the bench.

Wednesday, 4 July 2012
20:00

Queensland
Tries
Boyd (19') 1
Thurston (32') 1
Hodges (35') 1
Goals
Thurston 4/5
(33', 36', 52' pen, 64' pen)
Field goals
Cronk (75') 1
21 – 20
Report

Game details

New South Wales
Tries
1 (13') B Morris
1 (47') Stewart
1 (70') J Morris
Goals
4/4 Carney
(7' pen, 14' ,49' ,71')

Suncorp Stadium, Brisbane
Attendance: 52,437
Referee: Tony Archer, Ben Cummins
Player of the Match: Johnathan Thurston (Queensland)

1st half

New South Wales scored first with a penalty goal by Todd Carney, and then ran in the first try of the match in the 13th minute, scored by Brett Morris and converted by Carney, for an early lead of 8 points to nil. Queensland's Darius Boyd scored out wide after 19 minutes from a cut-out pass from Johnathan Thurston. Thirteen minutes later, from deep in Queensland's half, Thurston broke through an attempted Mitchell Pearce tackle and raced 35m up field before finding Brent Tate and Cooper Cronk in support; two tackles later Thurston accepted an offload from Corey Parker to score close to the posts. New South Wales then kicked the restart into touch on the full and three tackles later Justin Hodges scored a controversial try beside the posts, after calls from New South Wales players for obstruction were denied by the video referee. Thurston converted his own and Hodges' tries, and the score at the half-time break was 16–8 in favour of the Maroons.

2nd half

Seven minutes into the second half, Brett Stewart pounced on a Robbie Farah grubber kick into the Queensland in-goal and scored his third try of the series for the Blues just before the ball went dead; Carney converted the try to reduce the margin to 16–14. The next two scores were both Queensland penalty goals kicked by Thurston, one in the 49th minute and one in the 64th minute, to make the score 20–14. In the 70th minute, Josh Morris scored a try in the corner following a perfectly placed cross-field kick by Robbie Farah, Morris showing great skill to out-jump Darius Boyd and score before sliding into touch; Todd Carney then converted the kick from the sideline to even up the match at 20 points each. Maroons halfback Cooper Cronk kicked a field goal from 40m out to put Queensland ahead by one point with six minutes remaining. Mitchell Pearce then missed a long-range field goal in the final minute to give the Maroons a one-point victory, and their seventh successive State of Origin series victory. Nate Myles was awarded the Wally Lewis Medal for best player in the series while Johnathan Thurston, playing his 24th consecutive Origin match since debut, won his fifth Man of the Match award.

Johnathan Thurston's try in the 32nd minute of Game III saw him pass former New South Wales player Michael O'Connor (1985–91) as the second highest point scorer in Origin history.

This game set a new record for the highest television audience in Australia for a rugby league match since the introduction of the OzTam ratings system in 2001, and the 2nd highest OzTam-rated television audience in Australian television history (Games 1 and 2 were the 5th and 6th most watched respectively). This includes a record 421,000 viewership in Melbourne for Game 3, more than all the previous month's Friday Night AFL matches, and up 100,000 from the previous record set for Game 2.

== Teams ==
The 18th & 19th man are reserves to cover for any forthcoming injuries and, unless chosen, do not actually play.

=== New South Wales Blues ===
Position	Game 1	Game 2	Game 3
Fullback	Brett Stewart		
Wing	Jarryd Hayne		
Centre	Michael Jennings		
Centre	Josh Morris		
Wing	Akuila Uate		Brett Morris
Five-Eighth	Todd Carney		
Halfback	Mitchell Pearce		
Prop	Paul Gallen (c)	Tim Grant	
Hooker	Robbie Farah		
Prop	James Tamou		
2nd Row	Luke Lewis	Greg Bird	
2nd Row	Glenn Stewart		Beau Scott ^{2}
Lock	Greg Bird	Paul Gallen (c)	
Interchange	Trent Merrin		Tony Williams
Interchange	Jamie Buhrer	Luke Lewis	
Interchange	Ben Creagh		
Interchange	Tony Williams	Anthony Watmough	
Coach	Ricky Stuart		
18th Man	Aaron Woods ^{1}	Jamie Buhrer	Trent Merrin
19th Man	Joseph Leilua		Akuila Uate

1 - Tariq Sims was originally selected but withdrew due to injury. He was replaced by Aaron Woods.
2 - Glenn Stewart was originally selected to play but withdrew due to injury. He was replaced by Beau Scott.

=== Queensland Maroons ===
Queensland's team for the 2012 campaign featured one débutante in Brisbane utility Matt Gillett. No changes were made to the successful Game I team until Sam Thaiday was forced out when a shoulder injury failed to respond to treatment before Game II. This brought David Taylor into the starting side and Corey Parker onto the bench.

Position	Game 1	Game 2	Game 3
Fullback	Billy Slater		Greg Inglis ^{2}
Wing	Darius Boyd		
Centre	Greg Inglis		Dane Nielsen ^{2}
Centre	Justin Hodges		
Wing	Brent Tate		
Five-eighth	Johnathan Thurston		
Halfback	Cooper Cronk		
Prop forward	Matthew Scott		
Hooker	Cameron Smith (c)		
Prop	Petero Civoniceva		
2nd-row	Nate Myles		
2nd-row	Sam Thaiday	David Taylor ^{1}	Sam Thaiday
Lock	Ashley Harrison		Corey Parker
Interchange	Matt Gillett		
Interchange	David Taylor	Corey Parker ^{1}	Ben Te'o
Interchange	Ben Hannant		
Interchange	David Shillington		
Coach	Mal Meninga		
18th man	Daly Cherry-Evans	Dallas Johnson	Matt Bowen
19th man	Dane Nielson	Ben Barba	Dave Taylor

1 - Sam Thaiday was originally selected to play but withdrew due to a shoulder injury. He was replaced by interchange forward David Taylor whilst Corey Parker was called onto the bench.
2 - Billy Slater was originally selected to play but withdrew due to a knee injury sustained during Game II. He was replaced by Greg Inglis whilst Dane Nielson came into the centres for Inglis.

== Under-20s ==
The 2012 Under 20s State of Origin was the introduction of the State Of Origin concept to the Holden Cup. New South Wales win the inaugural Darren Lockyer Shield.

April 21, 2012
19:30

New South Wales	18 – 14	Queensland
Tries; Evans 1 Mata'utia1; Siejka1; Goals; Siejka 3/3	Report	Tries; Whitchurch 1 Lee 2 Goals; Frei 1/3

Centerbet Stadium, Sydney
Attendance: 5,105
Referee: Dave Munro
Player of the Match: Harry Siejka

== Women's State of Origin ==
Saturday, 23 June 2012
15.00 AEST

New South Wales	10–34	Queensland
Tries: 2 Sam Hammond; Tarah Westera; Goals: 1 Maddie Studdon	1st: 10–16; 2nd: 0–18	Tries: 8 Bianca Ambrum (4); Natalie Dwyer (2); Karina Brown; Karyn Murphy; Goals: 1 Amber Saltner

Centrebet Stadium, Penrith
Player of the Match: Heather Ballinger
