= Sione Masima =

Australian rugby league footballer

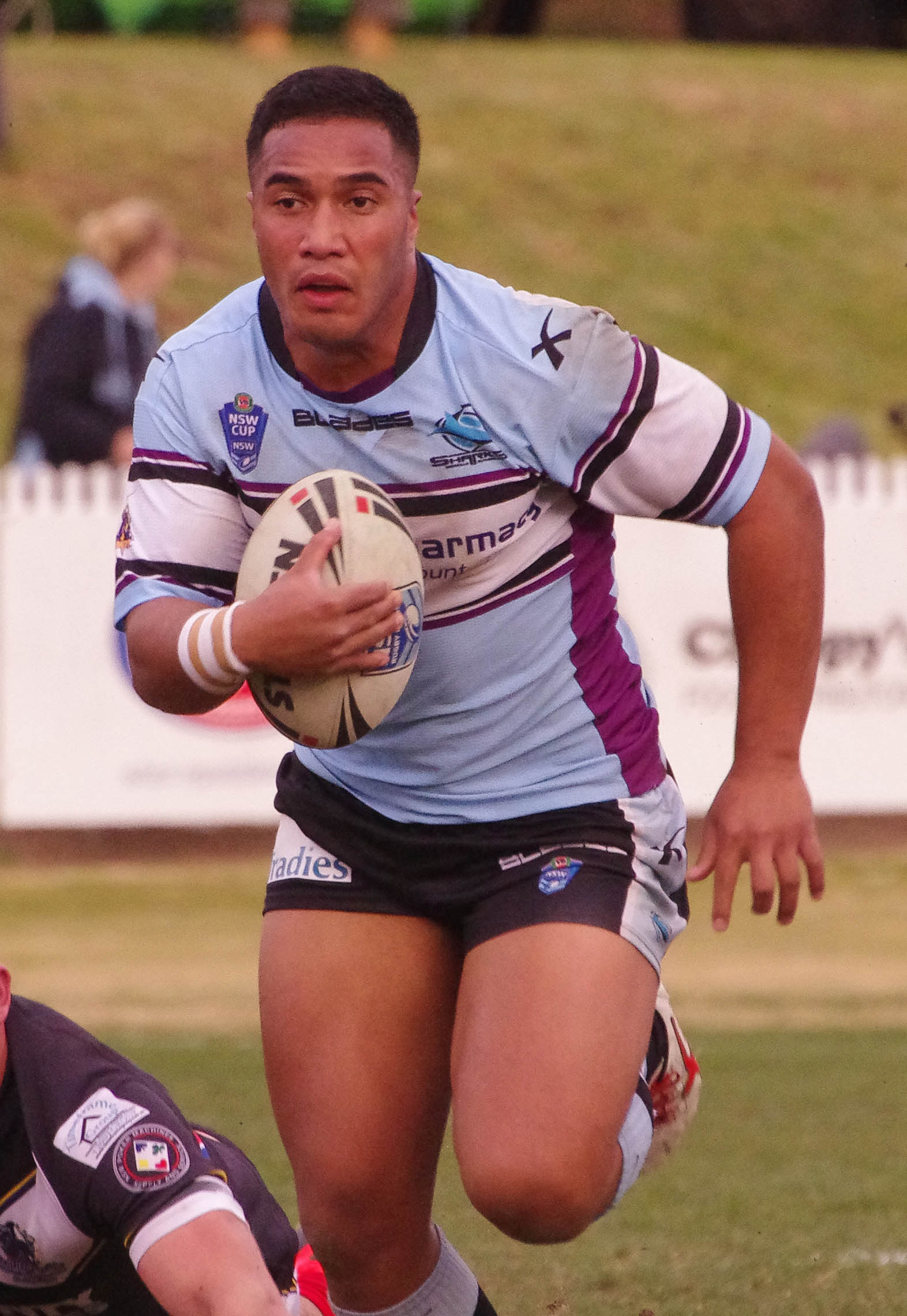
- Masima playing for the Sharks in 2014.

Personal information
- Born: 24 February 1993 (age 33) Camperdown, New South Wales, Australia
- Height: 185 cm (6 ft 1 in)
- Weight: 100 kg (15 st 10 lb)

Playing information
- Position: Second-row, Lock
Club
Years	Team	Pld	T	G	FG	P
2014	Cronulla-Sutherland	3	0	0	0	0
- Source: Rugby League Project As of 16 June 2015

Sione Masima (born 24 February 1993) is an Australian professional rugby league footballer who last played for the Cronulla-Caringbah Sharks in the Sydney Shield. He plays at second-row and lock and previously played for the Cronulla-Sutherland Sharks in the National Rugby League.

== Background ==
Born in Camperdown, New South Wales, Masima played his junior football for the Gymea Gorillas, before being signed by the Cronulla-Sutherland Sharks.

== Playing career ==
=== Early career ===
From 2011 to 2013, Masima played for the Cronulla-Sutherland Sharks' NYC team.

=== 2014 ===
In 2014, Masima moved on to Cronulla's New South Wales Cup team. In round 24 of the 2014 NRL season, he made his NRL debut for the Cronulla-Sutherland Sharks against the Canberra Raiders at Remondis Stadium, playing off the interchange bench in Cronulla's 22–12 loss. He went on to make a total of three appearances for Cronulla in 2014.

=== 2015 ===
In 2015, Masima joined the South Sydney Rabbitohs but made no first grade appearances. .

=== Later career ===
In 2015, Masima played for the Limoux Grizzlies in the Elite 1 competition. In 2017, Masima joined the Blacktown Workers Sea Eagles in the NSW Cup. Masima later played for Cronulla-Caringbah in the Sydney Shield.
