= Tim Grant (rugby league) =

Australian rugby league footballer

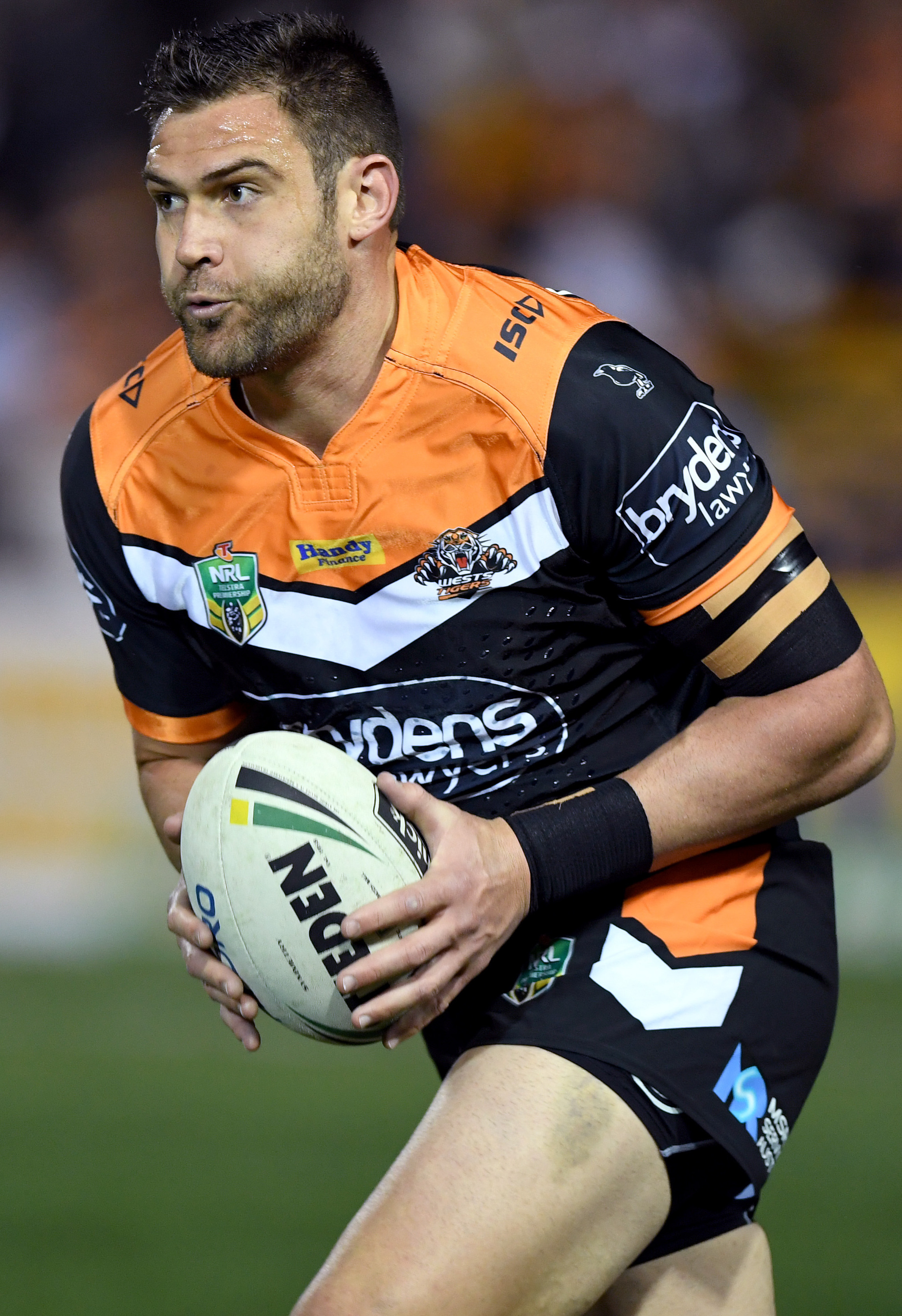

Personal information
- Born: 17 February 1988 (age 38) Penrith, New South Wales, Australia
- Height: 194 cm (6 ft 4 in)
- Weight: 110 kg (17 st 5 lb)

Playing information
- Position: Prop
Club
Years	Team	Pld	T	G	FG	P
2007–14	Penrith Panthers	122	3	0	0	12
2015	South Sydney	21	1	0	0	4
2016–18	Wests Tigers	46	2	0	0	8
2019	Penrith Panthers	7	2	0	0	8
	Total	196	8	0	0	32
Representative
Years	Team	Pld	T	G	FG	P
2010–14	City Origin	4	0	0	0	0
2011	Prime Minister's XIII	1	0	0	0	0
2012	New South Wales	2	0	0	0	0
2013	NRL All Stars	1	1	0	0	0
- Source: As of 7 June 2019

Tim Grant (born 17 February 1988) is an Australian professional rugby league footballer who plays as a prop.

He previously played for the Penrith Panthers in two separate spells, and the South Sydney Rabbitohs and the Wests Tigers in the NRL. Grant has played for City Origin, Prime Minister's XIII, New South Wales in the State of Origin series and the NRL All Stars.

== Background ==
Grant was born in Penrith, New South Wales, Australia.

== Playing career ==
Grant started his NRL career in 2007. He made his representative début for the City New South Wales team in the 2011 City vs Country Origin match.

Grant was selected to make his début for the New South Wales Blues in the 2012 State of Origin series' second game. He took the first hit-up of the match and was seen as contributing well to the Blues's victory.

Early in the 2014 NRL season Grant was relegated to the NSW Cup and was informed by Penrith to find a new club, despite having two years left on his contract. Although the club later changed its tune, Grant finalised a move to the South Sydney Rabbitohs in April 2014, signing a 4-year contract.

On 8 January 2016, Grant signed a 2-year contract with the Wests Tigers starting effective immediately, after being granted a release from the final 3 years of his South Sydney contract.

At the end of the 2018 NRL season, Grant was released by Wests. Grant then signed a contract to return to his former club Penrith for the 2019 NRL season. In Round 12 2019 against Manly-Warringah, Grant was taken from the field with an injury which was later revealed to be a torn pectoral muscle and was ruled out for the season. On 5 June 2019, Grant informed the Penrith club of his decision to terminate his contract.

On 14 November 2019, it was announced that Grant had signed a contract to join the Thirroul Butchers in the local Illawarra competition for 2020.

== Statistics ==
Year	Team	Games	Tries	Pts
2007	Penrith Panthers	11		
2008	Penrith Panthers	5		
2009	Penrith Panthers	17	1	4
2010	Penrith Panthers	18	1	4
2011	Penrith Panthers	23	1	4
2012	Penrith Panthers	16		
2013	Penrith Panthers	21		
2014	Penrith Panthers	11		
2015	South Sydney Rabbitohs	21	1	4
2016	Wests Tigers	22	1	4
2017	Wests Tigers	19		
2018	Wests Tigers	5	1	4
2019	Penrith Panthers	7	2	8
	Totals	196	8	32
