= Chris Grevsmuhl =

Australian rugby league footballer

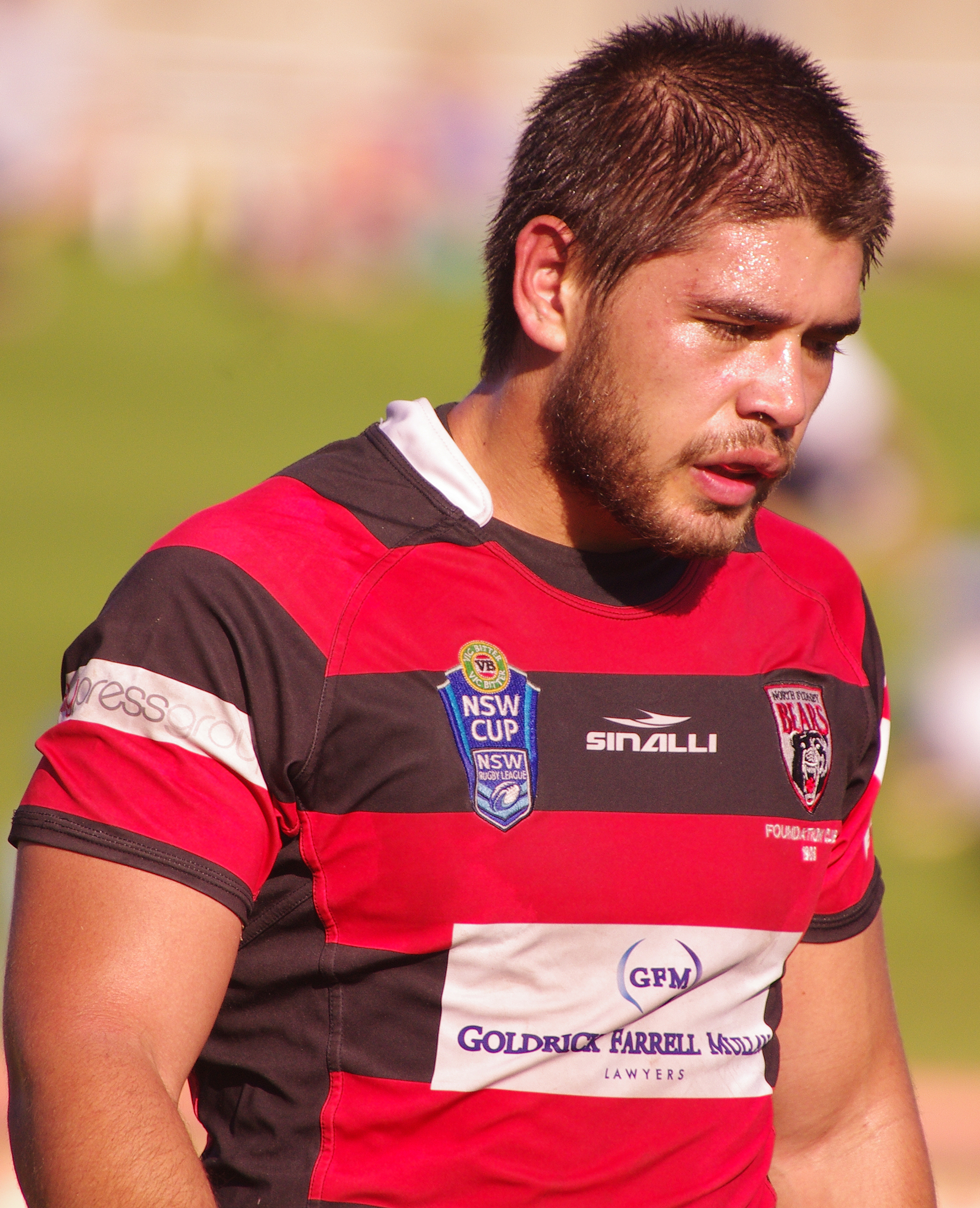

Personal information
- Born: 23 February 1993 (age 33) Townsville, Queensland, Australia
- Height: 186 cm (6 ft 1 in)
- Weight: 106 kg (16 st 10 lb)

Playing information
- Position: Second-row, Prop, Lock
Club
Years	Team	Pld	T	G	FG	P
2015–16	South Sydney	30	8	0	0	32
2016	Penrith Panthers	14	2	0	0	8
2017	Gold Coast Titans	4	1	0	0	4
	Total	48	11	0	0	44
Representative
Years	Team	Pld	T	G	FG	P
2015	Indigenous All Stars	1	1	0	0	4
- Source: As of 3 March 2018

Chris Grevsmuhl (born 23 February 1993) is an Australian professional rugby league footballer who previously played for the Gold Coast Titans, Penrith Panthers and the South Sydney Rabbitohs. An Indigenous All Stars representative, he plays at second-row and prop.

== Background ==
Born in Townsville, Queensland, Grevsmuhl is of Indigenous Australian descent.

He was educated at Ignatius Park College, Townsville and represented the 2010 Australian Schoolboys.

Grevsmuhl played his junior rugby league for the Hughenden Hawks and Townsville Brothers before being signed by the North Queensland Cowboys.

== Playing career ==
=== Early career ===
From 2011 to 2013, he played for the North Queensland Cowboys' NYC team. In October 2011, he scored two tries in the Cowboys' 2011 NYC Grand Final loss to the New Zealand Warriors. On 21 April 2012, he played for the Queensland under-20s team against the New South Wales under-20s team. On 13 October 2012, he played for the Junior Kangaroos against the Junior Kiwis. On 21 August 2012, he was named on the interchange bench in the 2012 NYC Team of the Year. In April 2013, he again played for the Queensland under-20s team against the New South Wales under-20s team. On 10 October 2013, he signed a 2-year contract with the South Sydney Rabbitohs starting in 2014. He spent the 2014 season playing for the Rabbitohs feeder New South Wales Cup team the North Sydney Bears.

=== 2015 ===
In the pre-season Grevsmuhl played in the Rabbitohs' Auckland Nines winning campaign, the Charity Shield, the World Club Series and scored a try on debut for the Indigenous All Stars in the annual All Stars match. In Round 1, he made his NRL debut for South Sydney against the Brisbane Broncos. In Round 4 against the Parramatta Eels, he scored his first NRL try in the 29–16 loss at Parramatta Stadium.

In Round 12 against the Gold Coast Titans, Grevsmuhl scored his first double in the 22–16 win at Cbus Super Stadium. He finished his debut year in the NRL with six tries from 22 matches and was awarded with the 2015 John Sattler Rookie of the Year award. On 7 October, he re-signed with the South Sydney club on a one-year contract.

=== 2016 ===
In January, it was revealed that Grevsmuhl had signed a two-year contract with the Penrith Panthers starting in 2017. Selected in the QAS Emerging Origin squad, on 5 February, he was one of eight players from the Maroons emerging camp who was banned from representing Queensland for 12-months after breaking curfew in Brisbane. He was selected to play for the Indigenous All Stars, but withdrew before the match.

On 20 May, Grevsmuhl joined the Penrith side mid-season after being released from the remainder of his South Sydney contract. He said that he was unwilling to play under Souths head coach Michael Maguire any further. Grevsmuhl said, "He's a mind-game specialist. He breaks you down mentally. He questioned why I was there, the effort I was putting in, and questioned why I was talking to other clubs.

On 25 November, Grevsmuhl was granted an immediate release from his Penrith contract on compassionate grounds.

=== 2017 ===
In March, the Gold Coast Titans announced the signing of Grevsmuhl for the 2017 and 2018 seasons.

On 2 April, Grevsmuhl made his Gold Coast debut, coming off the bench in the 28–22 loss to the New Zealand Warriors. He scored his first try for the Gold Coast in the 24–22 loss to the Brisbane Broncos in Round 7.

After being unable to play for the remainder of the 2017 season due to a shoulder injury, the Gold Coast released Grevsmuhl on 11 August after only four games with the club.

The same day that he was released from the Gold Coast, it was reported by various media outlets that Grevsmuhl took payment from fans for a number of his jerseys, but never delivered the goods. This incident led to the Titans stepping in and paying out the fans who were left out of pocket, and returning the payment from Grevsmuhl's salary. The Titans refused to comment whether or not this was the reason that they released Grevsmuhl.

=== 2018 ===
In March 2018, Grevsmuhl signed a one-year contract to join Group 10 country rugby league side CYMS Orange.

=== 2019 ===
During November 2019, Grevsmuhl was back spotted training with the South Sydney club, however Shane Richardson said they had no interest in signing him.
