= Ben Lowe =

Australian rugby league footballer (born 1985)

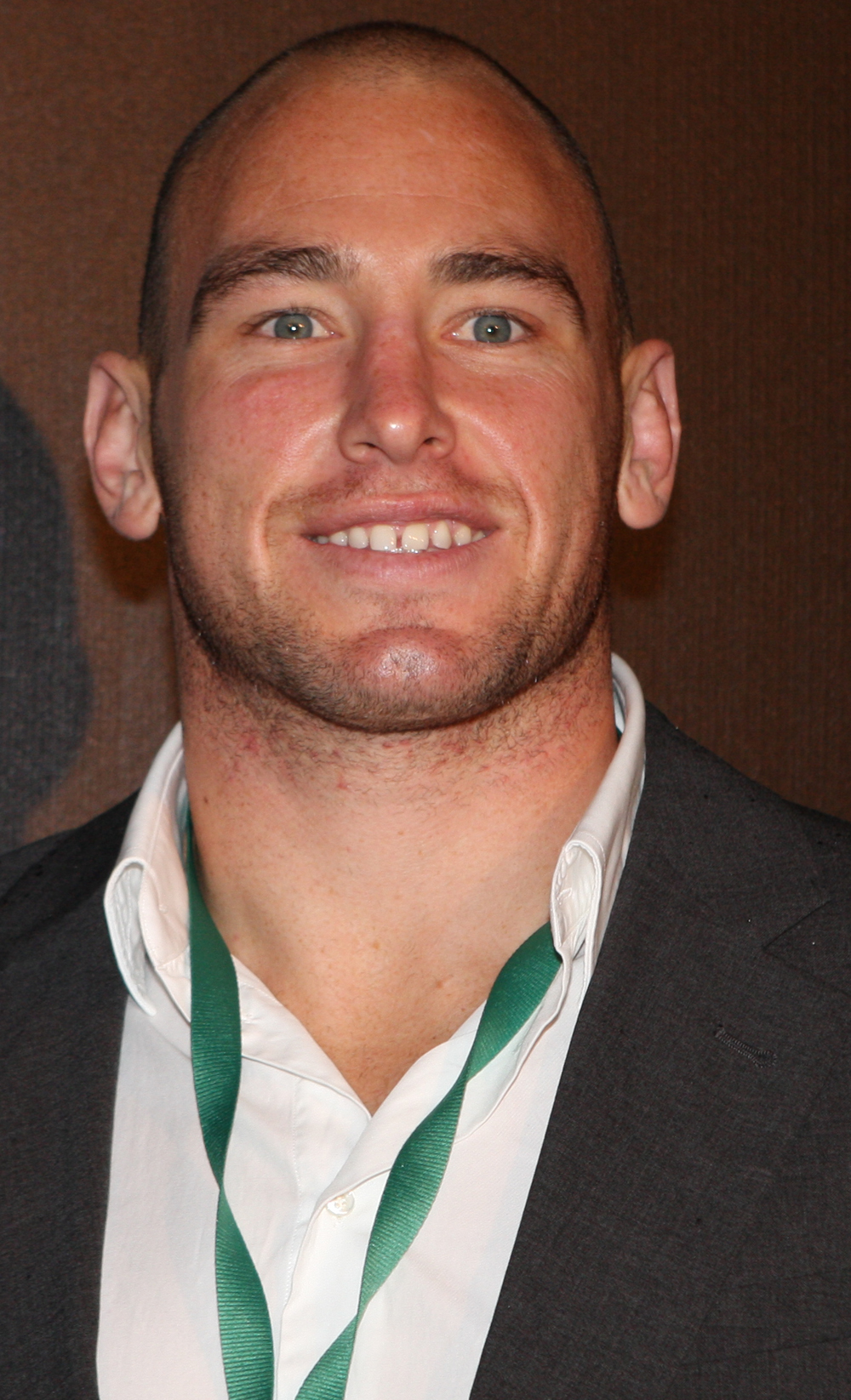
- Lowe at Man Of Steel movie premiere, Sydney, June 2013

Personal information
- Full name: Ben Lowe
- Born: 13 March 1985 (age 41) Toowoomba, Queensland, Australia

Playing information
- Height: 188 cm (6 ft 2 in)
- Weight: 98 kg (15 st 6 lb)
- Position: Lock, Second-row
Club
Years	Team	Pld	T	G	FG	P
2008–15	South Sydney	117	7	1	0	30
Representative
Years	Team	Pld	T	G	FG	P
2006	Queensland Residents	1	0	0	0	0
- Education: St Mary's College, Toowoomba
- Relatives: Jaiman Lowe (brother)

Ben Lowe (born 13 March 1985) is an Australian former professional rugby league footballer who played his whole career with the South Sydney Rabbitohs in the NRL. He primarily played lock and second-row.

== Early life ==
Born in Toowoomba, Queensland Ben is the brother of Jaiman. He was educated at St Mary's College, Toowoomba

== Playing career ==
In 2008, Lowe made his first grade debut in Round two for the South Sydney Rabbitohs against the Canterbury-Bankstown Bulldogs, a game in which he scored the first try of the match and also of his NRL career. In round 25 of 2009 he scored a try in South Sydney's 41–6 flogging of the St. George Illawarra Dragons.

Lowe is the younger brother of fellow Rabbitoh Jaiman Lowe. He was selected to be the 18th man in the Queensland squad for the third State Of Origin game in 2010. He was a part of the South Sydney squad that won the 2014 NRL Premiership, being named on an extended bench for the final after featuring in 17 regular season games. Lowe was reportedly "shattered" by the omission but did manage to play lock in Souths 39-0 victory over St Helens in the 2015 World Club Challenge.

On 5 August 2015, Lowe announced his retirement from rugby league. Injuries had forced Lowe to retire, with consideration to life after football for him and his family. Lowe 116 first grade games - all for South Sydney between the years of 2008 and 2015. Stated “Due to injuries I’ve had to make the difficult decision to retire from football immediately. It hasn't been the easiest decision to make but after long conversations with family and loved ones it was the best for my welfare and the best for my family as we head into life after football,”. Lowe also provided great service to South's feeder club side the North Sydney Bears where he played 45 games and scored 8 tries.

He played his last NRL game on 25 July 2015 where South Sydney beat Newcastle by 46 points in a 52-6 score. Lowe played for only 9 minutes off the bench in jersey number 14.

== Statistics ==
=== NRL ===
Statistics are correct as of Lowe's retirement at the end of the 2015 season

†	Denotes seasons in which Lowe was in the team that won NRL Premiership but did not play in the Grand Final.

Season	Team	Matches	T	G	GK %	F/G	Pts	W	L	D	W-L %
2008	South Sydney Rabbitohs	9	3	0	—	0	12	3	6	0	33.33
2009	South Sydney Rabbitohs	16	1	0	—	0	4	9	7	0	56.25
2010	South Sydney Rabbitohs	18	1	0	—	0	4	9	9	0	50.0
2011	South Sydney Rabbitohs	5	0	0	—	0	0	2	3	0	40.00
2012	South Sydney Rabbitohs	18	1	0	—	0	4	12	6	0	66.67
2013	South Sydney Rabbitohs	20	0	0	—	0	0	15	5	0	75.00
2014†	South Sydney Rabbitohs	17	1	1	100	0	6	9	8	0	52.94
2015	South Sydney Rabbitohs	14	0	0	—	0	0	9	5	0	64.3
Career totals		117	7	1/1	100	0	30	68	49	0	58.1

- Note: In 2014 Ben Lowe was asked to kick a goal for his 100th NRL game in round 23 against the Broncos
- Note 2: In 2015 Ben Lowe retired immediately at the end of round 21 due to ongoing injuries
