= David Tyrrell (rugby league) =

Australian rugby league footballer

Dave Tyrrell
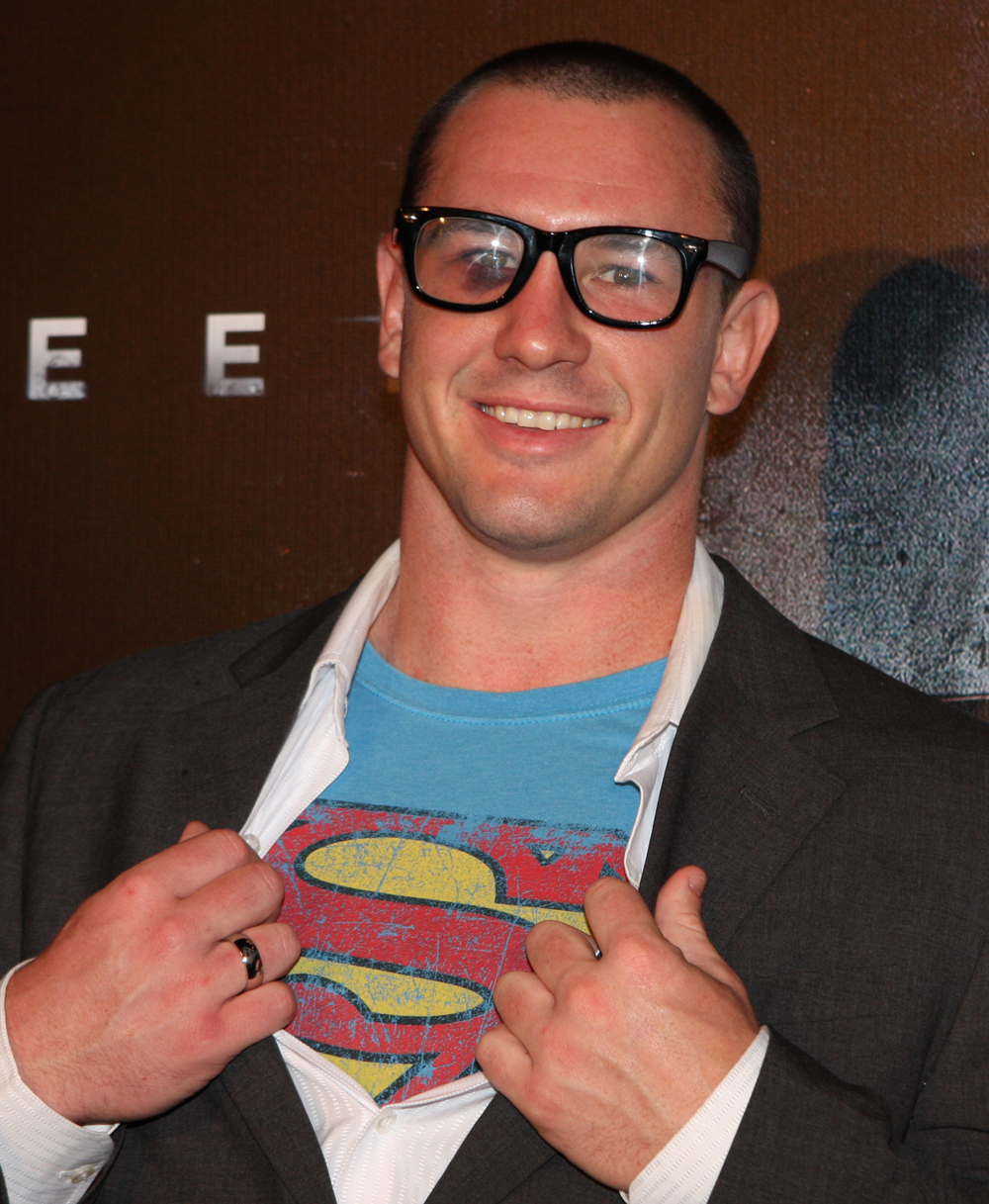

Personal information
- Full name: David Tyrrell
- Born: 9 October 1988 (age 38) Brisbane, Queensland, Australia
- Height: 190 cm (6 ft 3 in)
- Weight: 101 kg (15 st 13 lb)

Playing information
- Position: Prop, Second-row
Club
Years	Team	Pld	T	G	FG	P
2009–17	South Sydney	155	6	0	0	24
Representative
Years	Team	Pld	T	G	FG	P
2015	Prime Minister's XIII	1	0	0	0	0
- Source: As of 3 October 2017

David Tyrrell (born 9 October 1988) is an Australian former professional rugby league footballer. Tyrrell played his entire career for the South Sydney Rabbitohs in the NRL, primarily as a prop.

== Background ==
Tyrrell was born in Brisbane, Queensland, Australia.

== Playing career ==
In 2006, Tyrrell was selected for the Queensland under 19s side, secured a contract with the South Sydney Rabbitohs and won the Carbine Club "Colt of the Year" at the Queensland Rugby League South East Division Awards.

In round 18 of 2009 he made his debut for the Rabbitohs against the Penrith Panthers. In his second game, against the Brisbane Broncos, he scored a try.

On 5 October 2014, in the Rabbitohs 2014 NRL Grand Final against the Canterbury-Bankstown Bulldogs, Tyrrell played at prop in the Rabbitohs 30–6 victory.

David is an Australian Apprenticeships Ambassador for the Australian Government and an Apprentice Mentor in the NRL's Trade UP with the NRL Program. He had completed his own apprenticeship and, including his blossoming career as an NRL star, he is also a qualified electrician.

On 15 September 2015, Tyrrell was named as 18th man for the Prime Minister's XIII team to take on Papua New Guinea.

On 18 August 2017 it was announced by Souths that Tyrrell would be leaving the club at the end of the season. On 11 October 2017, Tyrrell signed with Queensland Cup side Easts Tigers.
