= 2018 Manly Warringah Sea Eagles season =

- NRL rank: 15
- 2018 record: Wins: 7; draws: 0; losses: 17
- Points scored: For: 500; against: 622

Team information
- Coach: (Australia) Trent Barrett
- Assistant coach: (Australia) John Cartwright
- Stadium: Lottoland
- Avg. attendance: 11,232
- High attendance: 31,118 (vs Brisbane Broncos, round 10)

Top scorers
- Tries: Shaun Lane, Tom Trbojevic (9)
- Goals: Daly Cherry-Evans (65)
- Points: Daly Cherry-Evans (164)
← 2017	2019 →

The 2018 Manly Warringah Sea Eagles season was the 69th in the club's history since their entry into the then New South Wales Rugby Football League premiership in 1947. The team came second last in the regular season and did not qualify for the finals.

== Signings/Transfers ==
=== Gains ===
Player	2017 Club	2018 Club	Ref
Joel Thompson	St George Illawarra Dragons	Manly-Warringah Sea Eagles	

=== Losses ===
Player	2017 Club	2018 Club	Ref
Brenton Lawrence	Manly-Warringah Sea Eagles	Gold Coast Titans	
Nate Myles	Manly-Warringah Sea Eagles	Melbourne Storm	
Blake Green	Manly-Warringah Sea Eagles	New Zealand Warriors	

== Ladder ==
Pos	Team	Pld	W	D	L	B	PF	PA	PD	Pts	
1	Sydney Roosters (M, P)	24	16	0	8	1	542	361	+181	34	Advance to finals series
2	Melbourne Storm	24	16	0	8	1	536	363	+173	34	Advance to finals series
3	South Sydney Rabbitohs	24	16	0	8	1	582	437	+145	34	Advance to finals series
4	Cronulla-Sutherland Sharks	24	16	0	8	1	519	423	+96	34	Advance to finals series
5	Penrith Panthers	24	15	0	9	1	517	461	+56	32	Advance to finals series
6	Brisbane Broncos	24	15	0	9	1	556	500	+56	32	Advance to finals series
7	St. George Illawarra Dragons	24	15	0	9	1	519	472	+47	32	Advance to finals series
8	New Zealand Warriors	24	15	0	9	1	472	447	+25	32	Advance to finals series
9	Wests Tigers	24	12	0	12	1	377	460	−83	26	
10	Canberra Raiders	24	10	0	14	1	563	540	+23	22	
11	Newcastle Knights	24	9	0	15	1	414	607	−193	20	
12	Canterbury-Bankstown Bulldogs	24	8	0	16	1	428	474	−46	18	
13	North Queensland Cowboys	24	8	0	16	1	449	521	−72	18	
14	Gold Coast Titans	24	8	0	16	1	472	582	−110	18	
15	Manly-Warringah Sea Eagles	24	7	0	17	1	500	622	−122	16	
16	Parramatta Eels (W)	24	6	0	18	1	374	550	−176	14	

Updated to match(es) played on 2 September 2018. Source: 2018 NRL Ladder
(M) Minor premiers; (P) Premiers; (W) Wooden spoon

== Fixtures ==
=== Regular season ===
Friday 9 March	Newcastle Knights	19 – 18	Manly-Warringah Sea Eagles	McDonald Jones Stadium, Newcastle
5:00pm (AEDT)	Tries: Kalyn Ponga, Slade Griffin, Lachlan Fitzgibbon; Goals: Kalyn Ponga (3/3)	[ Report]	Tries; Jorge Taufua, Shaun Lane, Brian Kelly; Goals: Daly Cherry-Evans (2/3), Daly Cherry-Evans (FG)	Attendance: 23,516; Referee: Adam Gee, Gavin Reynolds

Sunday 18 March	Manly-Warringah Sea Eagles	54 – 0	Parramatta Eels	Lottoland, Brookvale
3:10pm (AEDT)	Tries: Curtis Sironen (2), Daly Cherry-Evans, Apisai Koroisau, Addin Fonua-Blake, Lachlan Croker, Jake Trbojevic, Lloyd Perrett, Jorge Taufua; Goals: Daly Cherry-Evans (9/10)	[ Report]		Attendance: 10,502; Referee: Matt Cecchin, Alan Shortall

Saturday 24 March	South Sydney Rabbitohs	34 – 6	Manly-Warringah Sea Eagles	ANZ Stadium, Sydney
4:30pm (AEDT)	Tries; Robert Jennings (3), Richard Kennar (2), Hymel Hunt, Alex Johnston; Goals; Adam Doueihi (3/7)	[ Report]	Tries; Jackson Hastings; Goals; Daly Cherry-Evans (1/1)	Attendance: 12,553; Referee: Gavin Badger, Ziggy Przeklasa-Adamski

Saturday 31 March	Manly-Warringah Sea Eagles	32 – 16	Canberra Raiders	Lottoland, Brookvale
6:30pm (AEDT)	Tries: Matthew Wright, Daly Cherry-Evans, Jake Trbojevic, Tom Trbojevic; Goals: Daly Cherry-Evans	[ Report]	Tries: Jarrod Croker, Iosia Soliola, Jack Wighton; Goals: Jarrod Croker	Attendance: 9,392; Referee: Adam Gee, Tim Roby

Sunday 8 April	Gold Coast Titans	32 – 20	Manly-Warringah Sea Eagles	Marley Brown Oval
2:00pm (AEST)	Tries: Jai Arrow (2), Morgan Boyle, Anthony Don, Jarrod Wallace; Goals: Michael Gordon (5/6), Kevin Proctor (1/1)	[ Report]	Tries: Daly Cherry-Evans, Brian Kelly, Jonathan Wright; Goals: Daly Cherry-Evans	Attendance: 5,135; Referee: Ashley Klein, Tim Roby

Sunday 15 April	Manly-Warringah Sea Eagles	12 – 38	Wests Tigers	Lottoland, Brookvale
4:10pm (AEST)	Tries: Brad Parker, Joel Thompson; Goals: Daly Cherry-Evans (2/2)	[ Report]	Tries: Benji Marshall (2), Luke Brooks, Chris Lawrence, Jacob Liddle, Malakai Watene-Zelezniak; Goals: Esan Marsters (7/7)

Sunday 22 April	Parramatta Eels	44 – 10	Manly-Warringah Sea Eagles	ANZ Stadium, Sydney
2:00pm (AEST)	Tries: Michael Jennings, Kenny Edwards, Clinton Gutherson, George Jennings Corey Norman, Manu Ma'u, Kaysa Pritchard; Goals: Mitchell Moses (8/10)	[ Report]	Tries: Brad Parker, Akuila Uate; Goals: Daly Cherry-Evans (1/2)	Attendance: 11,069; Referee: Chris Sutton, Jon Stone

Friday 27 April	Manly-Warringah Sea Eagles	12 – 18	Newcastle Knights	Lottoland, Brookvale
6:00pm (AEST)	Tries: Dylan Walker, Shaun Lane; Goals: Daly Cherry-Evans (2/3)	[ Report]	Tries; Slade Griffin, Nathan Ross, Connor Watson; Goals: Ken Sio (3/4)	Attendance: 5,715; Referee: Adam Gee, Ziggy Przeklasa-Adamski

Sunday 6 May	Sydney Roosters	22 – 20	Manly-Warringah Sea Eagles	Allianz Stadium, Sydney
4:10pm (AEST)	Tries: Blake Ferguson, Isaac Liu, Jared Waerea-Hargreaves; Goals: Latrell Mitchell (5/5)	[ Report]	Tries: Akuila Uate (2), Addin Fonua-Blake; Goals: Daly Cherry-Evans (4/5)	Attendance: 10,129; Referee: Henry Perenara, Jon Stone

Saturday 12 May	Manly-Warringah Sea Eagles	38 – 24	Brisbane Broncos	Suncorp Stadium, Brisbane
6:00pm (AEST)	Tries: Joel Thompson (2), Jake Trbojevic (2), Apisai Koroisau, Akuila Uate; Goals: Daly Cherry-Evans (7/9)	[ Report]	Tries; Jamayne Isaako, Andrew McCullough, Anthony Milford, Sam Thaiday; Goals: Jamayne Isaako (4/5)	Attendance: 31,118; Referee: Grant Atkins, Chris Butler

Saturday 19 May	Melbourne Storm	4 – 24	Manly-Warringah Sea Eagles	AAMI Park, Melbourne
7:30pm (AEST)	Goals: Cameron Munster (2/2)	[ Report]	Tries: Moses Suli, Tom Trbojevic, Akuila Uate, Matthew Wright; Goals: Trent Hodkinson (3/6), Daly Cherry-Evans (1/1)	Attendance: 13,172; Referee: Henry Perenara, Ziggy Przeklasa-Adamski

Friday 25 May	Canberra Raiders	21 – 20	Manly-Warringah Sea Eagles	GIO Stadium, Canberra
6:00pm (AEST)	Tries: Nick Cotric (2), Jack Wighton; Goal: Jarrod Croker (3/6), Aidan Sezer (1 FG)	[ Report]	Tries: Daly Cherry-Evans, Brian Kelly, Joel Thompson; Goals: Trent Hodkinson (4/5)	Attendance: 11,105; Referee: Chris Butler, Alan Shortall

Thursday 31 May	Manly-Warringah Sea Eagles	12 – 26	North Queensland Cowboys	Lottoland, Brookvale
7:50pm (AEST)	Tries: Brian Kelly, Shaun Lane; Goals: Trent Hodkinson (2/3)	[ Report]	Tries: Antonio Winterstein (2), Jason Taumalolo, Enari Tuala; Goals: Johnathan Thurston (5/6)	Attendance: 6,172; Referee: Ben Cummins, Peter Gough

Saturday 9 June	Manly-Warringah Sea Eagles	34 – 14	New Zealand Warriors	AMI Stadium, Christchurch
3:00pm (NZST)	Tries: Brian Kelly, Apisai Koroisau; Goals: Trent Hodkinson (3/3)	[ Report]	Tries: David Fusitu'a (3), Tohu Harris, Shaun Johnson, Isaiah Papali'i; Goals: Shaun Johnson (5/6)	Attendance: 17,357; Referee: Chris Sutton, Gavin Reynolds

Saturday 16 June	St George Illawarra Dragons	32 – 8	Manly-Warringah Sea Eagles	WIN Stadium, Wollongong
5:30pm (AEST)

Saturday 30 June	Penrith Panthers	10 – 18	Manly-Warringah Sea Eagles	Panthers Stadium, Penrith
3:00pm (AEST)

Saturday 14 July	Manly-Warringah Sea Eagles	12 – 13	Melbourne Storm	Lottoland, Brookvale
5:30pm (AEST)

Sunday 22 July	Manly-Warringah Sea Eagles	24 – 56	Sydney Roosters	Lottoland, Brookvale
4:10pm (AEST)	Tries: Daly Cherry-Evans, Shaun Lane, Tom Trbojevic, Frank Winterstein; Goals: Trent Hodkinson (4/4)	[ Report]	Tries: Blake Ferguson (2), Latrell Mitchell (2), Lindsay Collins, Boyd Cordner, Joseph Manu, Victor Radley, Sio Siua Taukeiaho, James Tedesco; Goals: Latrell Mitchell (8/10)	Attendance: 9,427; Referee: Grant Atkins, Matt Noyen

Saturday, 28 July	Manly-Warringah Sea Eagles	24 – 28	Penrith Panthers	Lottoland, Brookvale
3:00pm (AEST)				Attendance: 6,134; Referee: Ben Cummins, Gavin Badger

Sunday 5 August	Cronulla-Sutherland Sharks	32 – 33	Manly-Warringah Sea Eagles	Southern Cross Group Stadium, Sydney
2:00pm (AEST)				Attendance: 13,273; Referee: Henry Perenara, Ziggy Przeklasa-Adamski

Saturday 11 August	Manly-Warringah Sea Eagles	18 – 6	Canterbury-Bankstown Bulldogs	Lottoland, Brookvale
5:30pm (AEST)	Tries: Tom Trbojevic (2), Addin Fonua-Blake; Goals: Daly Cherry-Evans (3/5)	[ Report]	Tries: Reimis Smith; Goals: Rhyse Martin (1/1)	Attendance: 11,283; Referee: Chris Sutton, Tim Roby

Friday 17 August	Manly-Warringah Sea Eagles	34 – 42	Gold Coast Titans	Lottoland, Brookvale
6:00pm (AEST)	Tries; Tom Trbojevic (3), Jake Trbojevic (2), Joel Thompson; Goals: Daly Cherry-Evans (5/6)	[ Report]	Tries: Alexander Brimson (2), Anthony Don, Mitch Rein, Phillip Sami, Jack Stockwell, Ashley Taylor; Goals: Ashley Taylor (7/8)	Attendance: 6,382; Referee: Chris Butler, Gavin Reynolds

Thursday 23 August	Wests Tigers	22–20	Manly-Warringah Sea Eagles	Campbelltown Stadium, Campbelltown
7:50pm (AEST)

Sunday 2 September	Brisbane Broncos	48–16	Manly-Warringah Sea Eagles	Suncorp Stadium, Sydney
4:10pm (AEST)
