= 2019 Manly Warringah Sea Eagles season =

- NRL rank: 6
- 2019 record: Wins: 14; draws: 0; losses: 10
- Points scored: For: 496; against: 446

Team information
- CEO: Lyall Gorman
- Coach: (Australia) Des Hasler
- Assistant coach: (Australia) John Cartwright
- Captain: Daly Cherry-Evans
- Stadium: Brookvale Oval (Lottoland)
- Avg. attendance: 13,777
- High attendance: 41,388 (vs Brisbane Broncos, round 9)

Top scorers
- Tries: (Australia) Reuben Garrick (16)
- Goals: (Australia) Reuben Garrick (65)
- Points: (Australia) Reuben Garrick (194)
← 2018	2020 →

The 2019 Manly-Warringah Sea Eagles season was the 70th in the club's history since their entry into the then New South Wales Rugby Football League premiership in 1947. The team came sixth in the regular season and qualified for the finals where they beat the Cronulla-Sutherland Sharks in an elimination final then lost to the South Sydney Rabbitohs in the semi-finals round.

== Signings/Transfers ==
=== Gains ===
Player	2018 Club	2019 Club	Ref
Trent Hodkinson	Cronulla-Sutherland Sharks	Manly-Warringah Sea Eagles	
Brendan Elliot	Gold Coast Titans	Manly-Warringah Sea Eagles	
Kane Elgey	Gold Coast Titans	Manly-Warringah Sea Eagles	
Reuben Garrick	St. George Illawarra Dragons	Manly-Warringah Sea Eagles	

=== Losses ===
Player	2018 Club	2019 Club	Ref
Lewis Brown	Manly-Warringah Sea Eagles	Retired	
Jackson Hastings	Manly-Warringah Sea Eagles	Super League: Salford Red Devils	
Brian Kelly	Manly-Warringah Sea Eagles	Gold Coast Titans	
Shaun Lane	Manly-Warringah Sea Eagles	Parramatta Eels	
Akuila Uate	Manly-Warringah Sea Eagles	Super League: Huddersfield Giants	
Frank Winterstein	Manly-Warringah Sea Eagles	Penrith Panthers	
Jonathan Wright	Manly-Warringah Sea Eagles	Retired	
Matthew Wright	Manly-Warringah Sea Eagles	Central Queensland Capras (Intrust Super Cup)	

== Ladder ==
2019 NRL season
Pos	Team	Pld	W	D	L	B	PF	PA	PD	Pts
1	Melbourne Storm	24	20	0	4	1	631	300	+331	42
2	Sydney Roosters	24	17	0	7	1	627	363	+264	36
3	South Sydney Rabbitohs	24	16	0	8	1	521	417	+104	34
4	Canberra Raiders	24	15	0	9	1	524	374	+150	32
5	Parramatta Eels	24	14	0	10	1	533	473	+60	30
6	Manly-Warringah Sea Eagles	24	14	0	10	1	496	446	+50	30
7	Cronulla-Sutherland Sharks	24	12	0	12	1	514	464	+50	26
8	Brisbane Broncos	24	11	1	12	1	432	489	−57	25
9	Wests Tigers	24	11	0	13	1	475	486	−11	24
10	Penrith Panthers	24	11	0	13	1	413	474	−61	24
11	Newcastle Knights	24	10	0	14	1	485	522	−37	22
12	Canterbury-Bankstown Bulldogs	24	10	0	14	1	326	477	−151	22
13	New Zealand Warriors	24	9	1	14	1	433	574	−141	21
14	North Queensland Cowboys	24	9	0	15	1	378	500	−122	20
15	St. George Illawarra Dragons	24	8	0	16	1	427	575	−148	18
16	Gold Coast Titans	24	4	0	20	1	370	651	−281	10

=== Ladder Progression ===
- Numbers highlighted in green indicate that the team finished the round inside the top 8.
- Numbers highlighted in blue indicates the team finished first on the ladder in that round.
- Numbers highlighted in red indicates the team finished last place on the ladder in that round.
- Underlined numbers indicate that the team had a bye during that round.

Team	1	2	3	4	5	6	7	8	9	10	11	12	13	14	15	16	17	18	19	20	21	22	23	24	25
Manly-Warringah Sea Eagles	0	0	2	4	6	6	8	10	10	12	12	12	14	16	18	20	20	22	24	26	26	28	30	30	30

== Fixtures ==
=== Regular season ===
Saturday 16 March	Wests Tigers	20 – 6	Manly-Warringah Sea Eagles	Campbelltown Stadium, Campbelltown
	Tries: Robbie Farah (2), Luke Garner; Goals: Esan Marsters (3/3)	[ Report]	Tries; Jorge Taufua, Goals: Daly Cherry-Evans (1/2)	Attendance: 13,159; Referee: Adam Gee, Adam Cassidy

Saturday 23 March	Manly-Warringah Sea Eagles	18 – 26	Sydney Roosters	Lottoland, Brookvale
	Tries: Manase Fainu, Jake Trbojevic, Moses Suli; Goals: Daly Cherry-Evans (3/3)	[ Report]	Tries: Brett Morris, Daniel Tupou (2), Boyd Cordner (2); Goals: Latrell Mitchell (3/5)	Attendance: 9,664; Referee: Matt Cecchin, Chris Buttler

Saturday 30 March	Manly-Warringah Sea Eagles	46 – 12	New Zealand Warriors	Christchurch Stadium, Christchurch
	Tries; Tom Trbojevic (2), Daly Cherry-Evans (2), Joel Thompson, Manase Fainu, Jorge Tafua, Reuben Garrick; Goals; Daly Cherry-Evans (7/9)	[ Report]	Tries; Isaiah Papali'i, Isaac Luke; Goals; Adam Keighran (2/2)	Attendance: 11,774; Referee: Dave Munro, Chris Sutton

Saturday 6 April	Manly-Warringah Sea Eagles	13 – 12	South Sydney Rabbitohs	Lottoland, Brookvale
	Tries: Tom Trbojevic, Manase Fainu; Goals: Daly Cherry-Evans (2/2), Daly Cherry-Evans (FG) (1/2)	[ Report]	Tries: Sam Burgess, Campbell Graham; Goals: Adam Reynolds (2/5), Adam Reynolds (FG) (0/2)	Attendance: 12,304; Referee: Grant Atkins, Liam Kennedy

Saturday 13 April	Newcastle Knights	18 – 26	Manly-Warringah Sea Eagles	Macdonald Jones Stadium, Newcastle
	Tries: Edrick Lee, Aidan Guerra, Mitchell Barnett; Goals: Kalyn Ponga (3/3)	[ Report]	Tries: Jorge Tafua, Reuben Garrick, Joel Thompson, Addin Fonua-Balke; Goals: Daly Cherry-Evans (5/6)	Attendance: 21,779; Referee: Peter Gough, Jon Stone

Saturday 20 April	St George Illawarra Dragons	12 – 10	Manly-Warringah Sea Eagles	WIN Stadium, Wollongong
	Tries: Matthew Dufty, Mikaele Ravalawa; Goals: Timoteo Lafai (2/5)	[ Report]	Tries: Brad Parker, Daly Cherry-Evans; Goals: Daly Cherry-Evans (1/2)	Attendance: 14,268; Referee: Dave Munro, Liam Kennedy

Sunday 28 April	Manly-Warringah Sea Eagles	24 – 20	Canberra Raiders	Lottoland, Brookvale
	Tries: Martin Taupau, Lachlan Croker (2), Reuben Garrick; Goals: Daly Cherry-Evans (2/2), Reuben Garrick (2/3)	[ Report]	Tries: Jack Wighton (2), Charnze Nicoll-Klokstad; Goals: Jarrod Croker (4/4)	Attendance: 10,706; Referee: Gerard Sutton, Adam Gee

Saturday 4 May	Manly-Warringah Sea Eagles	18 – 10	Canterbury-Bankstown Bulldogs	Lottoland, Brookvale
	Tries: Reuben Garrick (2); Goals: Reuben Garrick (5/5)	[ Report]	Tries; Reimis Smith (2); Goals: Rhyse Martin (1/2)	Attendance: 10,148; Referee: Henry Perenara, Jon Stone

Friday 10 May	Manly-Warringah Sea Eagles	10 – 26	Brisbane Broncos	Suncorp Stadium, Brisbane
	Tries: Apisai Koroisau, Jack Gosiewski; Goals: Reuben Garrick (1/2)	[ Report]	Tries: Anthony Milford, Corey Oates, Matt Gillett, Darius Boyd, David Fifita; Goals: Kotoni Staggs (3/5)	Attendance: 41,388; Referee: Ben Cummins, Ziggy Przeklasa-Adamski

Sunday 19 May	Cronulla-Sutherland Sharks	14 – 24	Manly-Warringah Sea Eagles	Southern Cross Group Stadium, Sydney
	Tries: Bronson Xerri, Braden Hamlin-Uele, Sosaia Feki; Goals: Kyle Flanagan (1/3)	[ Report]	Tries; Addin Fonua-Blake, Brendan Elliot, Kane Elgey, Dylan Walker; Goals: Reuben Garrick (4/4)	Attendance: 31,118; Referee: Ashley Klein, Matt Cecchin

Friday 24 May	Manly-Warringah Sea Eagles	18 – 36	Gold Coast Titans	Lottoland, Brookvale
	Tries: Jorge Tafua, Reuben Garrick, Brad Parker; Goals: Reuben Garrick (3/3)	[ Report]	Tries: Dale Copley (3), Alexander Brimson, Tyrone Roberts (2), Bryce Cartwright; Goals: Ashley Taylor (4/7)	Attendance: 7,465; Referee: Matt Cecchin, Phil Henderson

Thursday 30 May	Penrith Panthers	15 – 12	Manly-Warringah Sea Eagles	Panthers Stadium, Penrith
	Tries: Dylan Edwards, Liam Martin; Goals: James Maloney (3/3), James Maloney (FG)	[ Report]	Tries: Manase Fainu, Cade Cust; Goals: Reuben Garrick (2/2)	Attendance: 7,981; Referee: Ben Cummins, Peter Gough

Saturday 8 June	North Queensland Cowboys	20 – 22	Manly-Warringah Sea Eagles	1300SMILES Stadium, Townsville
	Tries: Kyle Feldt, Tom Opacic, Francis Molo; Goals: Jake Clifford (4/4)	[ Report]	Tries: Curtis Sironen, Joel Thompson, Jorge Tafua, Cade Cust; Goals: Reuben Garrick (3/4)	Attendance: 13,314; Referee: Adam Gee, Gavin Badger

Sunday 16 June	Manly-Warringah Sea Eagles	34 – 14	St George Illawarra Dragons	Lottoland, Brookvale
	Tries: Reuben Garrick, Dylan Walker, Jack Gosiewski, Cade Cust, Manase Fainu, Tom Trbojevic; Goals: Reuben Garrick (5/6)	[ Report]	Tries: Ben Hunt, Euan Aitken; Goals: Corey Norman (3/3)	Attendance: 8,468; Referee: Chris Sutton, Phil Henderson

Saturday 29 June	Gold Coast Titans	12 – 30	Manly-Warringah Sea Eagles	Cbus Super Stadium, Gold Coast
	Tries: Phillip Sami (2); Goals: Tyrone Roberts (2/3)	[ Report]	Tries: Curtis Sironen (2), Reuben Garrick, Jorge Taufua, Moses Suli; Goals: Reuben Garrick (5/7)	Attendance: 11,056; Referee: Chris Sutton, Phil Henderson

Saturday 13 July	South Sydney Rabbitohs	21 – 20	Manly-Warringah Sea Eagles	ANZ Stadium, Sydney
	Tries: Dean Britt, Dane Gagai, Campbell Graham; Goals: Adam Reynolds (4/5) (FG)		Tries: Cade Cust, Curtis Sironen, Moses Suli, Joel Thompson; Goals: Reuben Garrick (2/4)	Attendance: 13,434; Referee: Grant Atkins, Liam Kennedy

Sunday 21 July	Manly-Warringah Sea Eagles	36 – 24	Parramatta Eels	Lottoland, Brookvale
	Tries: Reuben Garrick (3), Daly Cherry-Evans, Tom Trbojevic, Brad Parker, Addin Fonua-Blake; Goals: Reuben Garrick (4/7)		Tries: Ethan Parry, Brad Takairangi, Nathan Brown, Maika Sivo; Goals: Mitchell Moses (4/4)	Attendance: 15,245; Referee: Matt Cecchin, Ziggy Przeklasa-Adamski

Saturday 27 July	Melbourne Storm	10 – 11	Manly-Warringah Sea Eagles	AAMI Park, Melbourne
	Tries: Will Chambers, Brandon Smith; Goals: Cameron Smith (1/2), Brodie Croft (FG) (0/5)		Tries: Joel Thompson; Goals: Reuben Garrick (3/3), Daly Cherry-Evans (FG) (1/4)	Attendance: 14,836; Referee: Grant Atkins, Peter Gough

Saturday 3 August	Manly-Warringah Sea Eagles	30 – 6	Newcastle Knights	Lottoland, Brookvale
	Tries: Curtis Sironen, Reuben Garrick (2), Joel Thompson, Martin Taupau, Jorge Tafua; Goals: Reuben Garrick (3/6), Daly Cherry-Evans (FG) (0/1)		Tries: Kalyn Ponga; Goals: Mason Lino (1/2)	Attendance: 15,012; Referee: Henry Perenara, Phil Henderson

Friday 9 August	New Zealand Warriors	24 – 16	Manly-Warringah Sea Eagles	Mount Smart Stadium, Auckland
	Tries: Ken Maumalo (2), Ligi Sao, Jazz Tevaga; Goals: Chanel Harris-Tavita (4/5)	[ Report]	Tries: Joel Thompson, Reuben Garrick (2); Goals: Reuben Garrick (2/3)	Attendance: 9,595; Referee: Ben Cummins, Ziggy Przeklasa-Adamski

Thursday 15 August	Manly-Warringah Sea Eagles	32 – 12	Wests Tigers	Lottoland, Brookvale
	Tries: Jack Gosiewski (2), Dylan Walker, Jorge Tafua, Moses Suli, Addin Fonua-Blake; Goals: Reuben Garrick (4/6)	[ Report]	Tries: David Nofoaluma, Luke Brooks; Goals: Paul Momirovski (2/2)	Attendance: 8,512; Referee: Gerard Sutton, Chris Butler

Sunday 25 August	Canberra Raiders	14 – 18	Manly-Warringah Sea Eagles	GIO Stadium, Canberra
	Tries: Jarrod Croker (2); Goals: Jarrod Croker (3/4)	[ Report]	Tries: Reuben Garrick, Jake Trbojevic; Goals: Reuben Garrick (5/5)	Attendance: 20,265; Referee: Ashley Klein, Ziggy Przeklasa-Adamski

Saturday 31 August	Manly-Warringah Sea Eagles	6 – 36	Melbourne Storm	Lottoland, Brookvale
	Tries: Taniela Paseka; Goals: Reuben Garrick (1/1)	[ Report]	Tries: Josh Addo-Carr, Justin Olam (3), Nelson Asofa-Solomona, Ryan Papenhuyzen; Goals: Cameron Smith (6/7)	Attendance: 14,640; Referee: Ben Cummins, Adam Gee

Friday 6 September	Parramatta Eels	32 – 16	Manly-Warringah Sea Eagles	Bankwest Stadium, Sydney
	Tries: Michael Jennings, Clinton Gutherson, Maika Sivo (3); Goals: Mitchell Moses (6/8)	[ Report]	Tries: Manase Fainu (2); Goals: Reuben Garrick (4/4)	Attendance: 25,034; Referee: Gerard Sutton, Phil Henderson

=== Finals ===
Saturday 14 September	Manly-Warringah Sea Eagles	28 – 16	Cronulla-Sutherland Sharks	Lottoland, Brookvale
	Tries: Apisai Koroisau, Moses Suli, Brad Parker, Addin Fonua-Blake, Brendan Elliot; Goals: Reuben Garrick (4/5)	[ Report]	Tries: Bronson Xerri, Aaron Gray, Josh Morris; Goals: Shaun Johnson (2/3)	Attendance: 15,495; Referee: Matt Cecchin, Henry Perenara

Friday 20 September	South Sydney Rabbitohs	34 – 26	Manly-Warringah Sea Eagles	ANZ Stadium, Sydney
	Tries: Alex Johnston, Cody Walker, Cameron Murray (2), John Sutton; Goals: Adam Reynolds (7/9)	[ Report]	Tries: Brad Parker, Corey Waddell, Daly Cherry-Evans, Moses Suli, Jack Gosiewski; Goals: Reuben Garrick (3/5)	Attendance: 32,127; Referee: Gerard Sutton, Adam Gee
