= 2017 Manly-Warringah Sea Eagles season =

- NRL rank: 6th
- Play-off result: Elimination Finals
- 2017 record: Wins: 11; draws: 0; losses: 6
- Points scored: For: 396; against: 309

Team information
- Coach: (Australia) Trent Barrett
- Assistant coach: (Australia) John Cartwright
- Captains: (Australia) Daly Cherry-Evans; (Australia) Jake Trbojevic (vice-captain)
- Stadium: Lottoland
- Avg. attendance: 13,640
- High attendance: 44,127 (vs Brisbane Broncos, round 10)

Top scorers
- Tries: Akila Uate 14
- Goals: Mathew Wright 31 Goals
- Points: Dylan Walker 104 points
← 2016	2018 →

The 2017 Manly Warringah Sea Eagles season was the 68th in the club's history since their entry into the then New South Wales Rugby Football League premiership in 1947.

The 2017 Sea Eagles was coached by former Australian international Trent Barrett. With the retirement of long time captain Jamie Lyon, the team captain was Daly Cherry-Evans with Jake Trbojevic named as vice-captain. The club competed in the National Rugby League's 2017 Telstra Premiership and played its home games at the 23,000 capacity Brookvale Oval, which for the first time was known as Lottoland due to a sponsorship agreement.

== Squad list ==
Manly Sea Eagles 2017 squad
First team squad			Coaching staff
Billy Bainbridge – SR, LK; Lewis Brown – SR, CE, HK; Daly Cherry-Evans (c) – HB, FE; Cameron Cullen – FE, HB, HK; Addin Fonua-Blake – PR; Pita Godinet – FE, HB, HK; Blake Green – FE; Jackson Hastings – HB, FE, HK, FB; Brian Kelly – CE, WG, FB; Jarrad Kennedy – SR, LK, CE; Apisai Koroisau – HK, FE, HB; Shaun Lane – SR; Brenton Lawrence – PR	Darcy Lussick – PR, LK; Joey Lussick – HK; Brad Parker – CE, WG; Lloyd Perrett – PR; Lucas Price – WG, FB; Peter Schuster – WG, CE, FB; Curtis Sironen – SR, LK, FE; Kelepi Tanginoa – SR, LK; Jorge Taufua – WG, CE; Martin Taupau – PR, SR, LK; Jake Trbojevic (vc) – LK, PR; Tom Trbojevic – FB, WG, CE; Akuila Uate – WG	Dylan Walker – CE, FE; Frank Winterstein – SR; Jonathan Wright – CE, WG; Matthew Wright – CE, WG, FB, FE; Tom Wright – FE, FB	Head coach: Trent Barrett; Assistant coach: John Cartwright; Legend: (c) Captain(s); (vc) Vice-captain(s); Injured; Updated: 10 August 2017; Source(s): Manly Squad 2017

=== 2017 signings/transfers ===
Note: The "Out" column is from the players who were with the team as of the end of the 2016 NRL season. Players who left the club before the end of the season (e.g. Tom Symonds) are not included.

Gains

- Cameron Cullen from Gold Coast Titans
- Blake Green from Melbourne Storm
- Jackson Hastings from Sydney Roosters
- Brian Kelly from Gold Coast Titans
- Jarrad Kennedy from Canberra Raiders
- Shaun Lane from New Zealand Warriors
- Lloyd Perrett from Canterbury-Bankstown Bulldogs
- Peter Schuster from rugby union
- Curtis Sironen from Wests Tigers
- Kelepi Tanginoa from Parramatta Eels
- Akuila Uate from Newcastle Knights
- Jonathan Wright from New Zealand Warriors

Out

- Jamie Buhrer to Newcastle Knights
- Nathan Green released
- Liam Knight to Sydney Roosters
- Blake Leary to North Queensland Cowboys
- Jamie Lyon to retired
- Steve Matai to retired*
- Nate Myles to Melbourne Storm*
- Matt Parcell to Leeds Rhinos
- Josh Starling to Newcastle Knights
- Brett Stewart to retired*
- Siosaia Vave to Parramatta Eels
- Brayden Wiliame to Catalans Dragons

* Seeking medical retirement as of 10 February 2017.
* Nate Myles released on 8 June

== Kit ==
Home	Away

== Milestones ==
- Round 1: Brian Kelly made his first grade debut

== Ladder ==
2017 NRL season
Pos	Team	Pld	W	D	L	B	PF	PA	PD	Pts
1	Melbourne Storm (P)	24	20	0	4	2	633	336	+297	44
2	Sydney Roosters	24	17	0	7	2	500	428	+72	38
3	Brisbane Broncos	24	16	0	8	2	597	433	+164	36
4	Parramatta Eels	24	16	0	8	2	496	457	+39	36
5	Cronulla-Sutherland Sharks	24	15	0	9	2	476	407	+69	34
6	Manly-Warringah Sea Eagles	24	14	0	10	2	552	512	+40	32
7	Penrith Panthers	24	13	0	11	2	504	459	+45	30
8	North Queensland Cowboys	24	13	0	11	2	467	443	+24	30
9	St. George Illawarra Dragons	24	12	0	12	2	533	450	+83	28
10	Canberra Raiders	24	11	0	13	2	558	497	+61	26
11	Canterbury-Bankstown Bulldogs	24	10	0	14	2	360	455	−95	24
12	South Sydney Rabbitohs	24	9	0	15	2	464	564	−100	22
13	New Zealand Warriors	24	7	0	17	2	444	575	−131	18
14	Wests Tigers	24	7	0	17	2	413	571	−158	18
15	Gold Coast Titans	24	7	0	17	2	448	638	−190	18
16	Newcastle Knights	24	5	0	19	2	428	648	−220	14

== NRL Auckland Nines ==
Piha Pool
Team	Pld	W	D	L	PF	PA	PD	Pts
Parramatta Eels	3	3	0	0	66	23	+43	6
Manly Warringah Sea Eagles	3	2	0	1	50	48	+2	4
St George Illawarra Dragons	3	1	0	2	45	65	−20	2
New Zealand Warriors	3	0	0	3	21	46	−25	0

4 February 2017	New Zealand Warriors	11 – 15	Manly Warringah Sea Eagles	Auckland, New Zealand
15:15 AEDST	11		15	Stadium: Eden Park

4 February 2017	St. George Illawarra Dragons	20 – 23	Manly Warringah Sea Eagles	Auckland, New Zealand
14:45 AEDST	20		23	Stadium: Eden Park

5 February 2017	Manly Warringah Sea Eagles	12 – 17	Parramatta Eels	Auckland, New Zealand
09:25 AEDST	12		17	Stadium: Eden Park

Quarter Final

5 February 2017	Penrith Panthers	16 – 12 (Golden Try)	Manly Warringah Sea Eagles	Auckland, New Zealand
11:55 AEDST	Bonus Point Tries: Waqa Blake, Sione Katoa; Tries: Tyrone May; Conversions: Corey Harawira-Naera (1/2)	[Report Report]	Bonus Point Tries: Brian Kelly, Dylan Walker; Tries: Conversions: Cameron Cullen (1/2)	Stadium: Eden Park

== Trial Games ==
Saturday 11 February	Manly-Warringah Sea Eagles	22 – 16	South Sydney	Campbelltown Stadium, Sydney
8:00pm (AEDT)	Tries: Jarrad Kennedy, Jonathan Wright, Dylan Walker, Peter Schuster; Goals: Dylan Walker (3/5)	[ Report]	Tries: Sitiveni Moceidreke, Siosifa Talakai, Ed Murphy; Goals: Levido, Doueihi	Attendance: 2,465; Referee: NA; Player of the Match: NA

Saturday 18 February	Sydney Roosters	22 – 24	Manly-Warringah Sea Eagles	Central Coast Stadium, Gosford
6:30pm (AEST)	Tries: Daniel Tupou (2), Blake Ferguson, Latrell Mitchell; Goals: Michael Gordon (3/4)	[ Report]	Tries: Tom Trbojevic, Curtis Sironen, Frank Winterstein, Dylan Walker; Goals: Dylan Walker (4/4)	Attendance: NA; Referee: NA; Player of the Match: NA

== Fixtures ==
2017 NRL draw - Manly-Warringah Sea Eagles.

=== Regular season ===
Sunday 5 March	Manly-Warringah Sea Eagles	12 – 20	Parramatta Eels	Lottoland, Sydney
4:00pm (AEDT)	Tries: Brian Kelly, Blake Green; Goals: Dylan Walker (2/2)	[ Report]	Tries: Corey Norman, Bevan French, Clinton Gutherson; Goals: Clinton Gutherson (4/5)	Attendance: 11,318; Referee: Grant Atkins, Chris Butler; Player of the Match: Corey Norman

Saturday 11 March	Manly-Warringah Sea Eagles	18 – 38	South Sydney Rabbitohs	Lottoland, Sydney
5:30pm (AEDT)	Tries: Akuila Uate, Brian Kelly, Tom Trbojevic, Daly Cherry-Evans; Goals: Dylan Walker (1/4)	[ Report]	Tries: Alex Johnston (2), Robert Jennings, Cody Walker, John Sutton, Robbie Farah; Goals: Adam Reynolds (7/7)	Attendance: 10,183; Referee: Gavin Badger, Jon Stone; Player of the Match: Cody Walker

Saturday 18 March	North Queensland Cowboys	8 – 30	Manly-Warringah Sea Eagles	1300SMILES Stadium, Townsville
8:00pm (AEDT)	Tries: Jake Granville; Goals: Johnathan Thurston (2/2)	[ Report]	Tries: Jorge Taufua, Tom Trbojevic, Brenton Lawrence, Jackson Hastings; Goals: Dylan Walker (7/7)	Attendance: 14,763; Referee: Henry Perenara, Peter Gough; Player of the Match: Brenton Lawrence

Saturday 25 March	Manly-Warringah Sea Eagles	36 – 0	Canterbury-Bankstown Bulldogs	Lottoland, Sydney
4:30pm (AEDT)	Tries: Brian Kelly (2), Dylan Walker, Curtis Sironen, Tom Trbojevic, Api Koroisau, Akuila Uate; Goals: Dylan Walker (4/7)	[ Report]	Tries: Goals:	Attendance: 9,610; Referee: Gavin Badger, Jon Stone; Player of the Match: Daly Cherry-Evans

Friday 31 March	Sydney Roosters	12 – 18	Manly-Warringah Sea Eagles	Allianz Stadium, Sydney
6:00pm (AEDT)	Tries: Shaun Kenny-Dowall, Mitchell Pearce; Goals: Michael Gordon (2/3)	[ Report]	Tries: Dylan Walker (2), Jorge Taufua; Goals: Dylan Walker (3/4)	Attendance: 12,376; Referee: Ben Cummins, Chris Butler; Player of the Match: Dylan Walker

Saturday 8 April	Manly-Warringah Sea Eagles	10 – 35	St George Illawarra Dragons	Lottoland, Sydney
3:00pm (AEST)	Tries: Jorge Taufua (2); Goals: Dylan Walker (1/2)	[ Report]	Tries: Euan Aitken (2) Gareth Widdop (2), Jack de Belin, Kurt Mann; Goals: Gareth Widdop (5/7); Field Goals: Gareth Widdop	Attendance: 11,654; Referee: Gavin Badger, Chris James; Player of the Match: Gareth Widdop

Saturday 15 April	Manly-Warringah Sea Eagles	26 – 30	Melbourne Storm	Lottoland, Sydney
3:00pm (AEST)	Tries: Frank Winterstein, Jorge Taufua, Brian Kelly, Jake Trbojevic, Brenton Lawrence; Goals: Dylan Walker (3/5)	[ Report]	Tries: Suliasi Vunivalu (2), Felise Kaufusi (2), Young Tonumaipea, Josh Addo-Carr; Goals: Cameron Smith (3/6)	Attendance: 10,144; Referee: Ashley Klein, Chris Butler; Player of the Match: Cameron Smith

Friday 21 April	Canberra Raiders	18 – 20 (gp)	Manly-Warringah Sea Eagles	GIO Stadium, Canberra
6:00pm (AEST)	Tries: Jarrod Croker, Josh Papalii, Jordan Rapana; Goals: Jarrod Croker (3/4)	[ Report]	Tries: Jake Trbojevic, Dylan Walker, Tom Trbojevic; Goals: Dylan Walker (4/6)	Attendance: 15,976; Referee: Grant Atkins, Chris Sutton; Player of the Match: Martin Taupau

Friday 28 April	South Sydney Rabbitohs	8 – 46	Manly-Warringah Sea Eagles	Allianz Stadium, Sydney
6:00pm (AEST)	Tries: Hymel Hunt; Goals: Adam Reynolds (2/2)	[ Report]	Tries: Akuila Uate (4), Brenton Lawrence, Curtis Sironen, Jorge Taufua, Jake Trbojevic, Blake Green; Goals: Dylan Walker (3/6); Daly Cherry-Evans (0/1); Jackson Hastings (2/2)	Attendance: 10,594; Referee: Gavin Badger, Gavin Reynolds; Player of the Match: Dylan Walker

Representative Round

Saturday 13 May	Manly-Warringah Sea Eagles	14 – 24	Brisbane Broncos	Suncorp Stadium, Brisbane
7:50pm (AEST)	Tries: Tom Trbojevic, Apisai Koroisau, Jorge Taufua; Goals: Dylan Walker (0/1); Apisai Koroisau (1/2)	[ Report]	Tries: Corey Oates (2), Anthony Milford, Kodi Nikorima; Goals: Jordan Kahu (4/4)	Attendance: 44,127; Referee: Ashley Klein, Jon Stone; Player of the Match: Anthony Milford

Saturday 20 May	Gold Coast Titans	10 – 30	Manly-Warringah Sea Eagles	Cbus Super Stadium, Gold Coast
5:30pm (AEST)	Tries: Ash Taylor, Anthony Don; Goals: Ash Taylor (1/2)	[ Report]	Tries: Dylan Walker (2), Akuila Uate, Apisai Koroisau, Jake Trbojevic; Goals: Matthew Wright (5/5)	Attendance: 12,509; Referee: Matt Cecchin, Adam Gee; Player of the Match: Jake Trbojevic

Bye

Sunday 4 June	Manly-Warringah Sea Eagles	21 – 20 (gp)	Canberra Raiders	Lottoland, Sydney
2:00pm (AEST)	Tries: Dylan Walker, Martin Taupau, Jorge Taufua, Daly Cherry-Evans; Goals: Matthew Wright (2/4); Field Goals: Daly Cherry-Evans (1)	[ Report]	Tries: Jordan Rapana (2), Blake Austin; Goals: Jarrod Croker (4/4)	Attendance: 11,318; Referee: Gerard Sutton, Chris Butler; Player of the Match: Daly Cherry-Evans

Friday 9 June	Manly-Warringah Sea Eagles	18 – 14	Newcastle Knights	Lottoland, Sydney
6:00pm (AEST)	Tries: Akuila Uate (2), Curtis Sironen; Goals: Matthew Wright (3/3)	[ Report]	Tries: Jaelen Feeney, Danny Levi; Goals: Brock Lamb (3/3)	Attendance: 4,189; Referee: Ashley Klein, Jon Stone; Player of the Match: Martin Taupau

Bye

Sunday 25 June	Cronulla-Sutherland Sharks	18 – 35	Manly-Warringah Sea Eagles	Southern Cross Group Stadium, Sydney
4:00pm (AEST)	Tries: Luke Lewis, Sosaia Feki, Wade Graham; Goals: James Maloney (3/3)	[ Report]	Tries: Curtis Sironen (2), Matthew Wright (2), Blake Green, Dylan Walker; Goals: Matthew Wright (5/6); Field Goals: Daly Cherry-Evans (1)	Attendance: 14,766; Referee: Ben Cummins, Chris Butler; Player of the Match: Daly Cherry-Evans

Saturday 1 July	Manly-Warringah Sea Eagles	26 – 22	New Zealand Warriors	nib Stadium, Perth
3:30pm (AWST)	Tries: Tom Trbojevic (2), Brian Kelly, Akuila Uate, Dylan Walker; Goals: Matthew Wright (3/5)	[ Report]	Tries: Charnze Nicoll-Klokstad (2), Bodene Thompson, Roger Tuivasa-Sheck; Goals: Shaun Johnson (3/4)	Attendance: 6,258; Referee: Gavin Badger, Tim Roby; Player of the Match: Daly Cherry-Evans

Saturday 8 July	Penrith Panthers	16 – 8	Manly-Warringah Sea Eagles	Pepper Stadium, Sydney
5:30pm (AEST)	Tries: James Tamou, Dallin Watene Zelezniak; Goals: Nathan Cleary (4/5)	[ Report]	Tries: Dylan Walker, Tom Trbojevic; Goals: Dylan Walker (0/2)	Attendance: 14,625; Referee: Henry Perenara, Chris James; Player of the Match: Dallin Watene Zelezniak

Sunday 16 July	Manly-Warringah Sea Eagles	28 – 16	Wests Tigers	Lottoland, Sydney
2:00pm (AEST)	Tries: Matthew Wright (2), Shaun Lane, Akuila Uate, Jake Trbojevic; Goals: Daly Cherry-Evans (4/5); Matthew Wright (0/1)	[ Report]	Tries: Joel Edwards, Esan Marsters, Luke Brooks; Goals: Tuimoala Lolohea (2/3)	Attendance: 14,128; Referee: Gerard Sutton, Tim Roby; Player of the Match: Tom Trbojevic

Sunday 23 July	St George Illawarra Dragons	52-22	Manly-Warringah Sea Eagles	WIN Stadium, Wollongong
2:00pm (AEST)	Tries: Euan Aitken (2), Jason Nightingale (2), Matthew Dufty, Jacob Host, Timoteo Lafai, Paul Vaughan, Gareth Widdop; Goals: Gareth Widdop (8/9)	[ Report]	Tries: Darcy Lussick, Joey Lussick, Jake Trbojevic, Akuila Uate, Dylan Walker; Goals: Daly Cherry-Evans (2/2), Jackson Hastings (1/2)	Attendance: 16,883

Sunday 30 July	Melbourne Storm	40-6	Manly-Warringah Sea Eagles	AAMI Park, Melbourne
2:00pm (AEST)	Tries: Josh Addo-Carr, Kenneth Bromwich, Will Chambers, Cooper Cronk, Jahrome Hughes, Joe Stimson, Suliasi Vunivalu; Goals: Cameron Smith (6/8)	[ Report]	Tries: Matthew Wright; Goals: Matthew Wright (1/1)	Attendance: 15,036

Sunday 8 August	Manly-Warringah Sea Eagles	36-18	Sydney Roosters	Lottoland, Sydney
2:00pm (AEST)	Tries: Tom Trbojevic (2), Lewis Brown, Daly Cherry-Evans, Brad Parker, Matthew Wright; Goals: Matthew Wright (4/5), Daly Cherry-Evans (2/2)	[ Report]	Tries: Luke Keary, Latrell Mitchell, Daniel Tupou; Goals: Latrell Mitchell (3/3)	Attendance: 14,564; Referee: Matt Cecchin, Grant Atkins

Sunday 13 August	Wests Tigers	30-26	Manly-Warringah Sea Eagles	Leichhardt Oval, Sydney
4:00pm (AEST)	Tries: Tuimoala Lolohea, Kevin Naiqama, Sauaso Sue, Elijah Taylor, Malakai Watene-Zelezniak; Goals: Tuimoala Lolohea (5/5)	[ Report]	Tries: Daly Cherry-Evans (2), Akuila Uate, Lloyd Perrett; Goals: Matthew Wright (3/5)	Attendance: 12,208; Referee: Grant Atkins, Chris James

Sunday 20 August	Canterbury-Bankstown Bulldogs	30-16	Manly-Warringah Sea Eagles	ANZ Stadium, Sydney
4:00pm (AEST)	Tries: Marcelo Montoya (2), Brett Morris (2), Brenko Lee, Josh Morris; Goals: Moses Mbye (3/6)	[ Report]	Tries: Lewis Brown, Brian Kelly, Jake Trbojevic; Goals: Daly Cherry-Evans (1/1), Matthew Wright (1/2)	Attendance: 8,912; Referee: Ben Cummins, Gavin Badger

Sunday 27 August	New Zealand Warriors	21-22 (gp)	Manly-Warringah Sea Eagles	Mount Smart Stadium, Auckland
4:00pm (NZST)	'Tries: David Fusitu'a, Blake Ayshford, Ken Maumalo; Goals: Shaun Johnson (1/1), Isaac Luke (1/3), Shaun Johnson (FG)	[ Report]	Tries: Jake Trbojevic, Tom Trbojevic, Dylan Walker; Goals: Matthew Wright, Daly Cherry-Evans (2 FG)	Attendance: 9,167; Referee: Gavin Badger, Chris Sutton

Saturday 2 September	Manly-Warringah Sea Eagles	28-12	Penrith Panthers	Lottoland, Sydney
5:30pm (AEST)	Tries: Daly Cherry-Evans, Brian Kelly, Curtis Sironen, Jake Trbojevic, Tom Trbojevic; Goals: Matthew Wright (4/5)	[ Report]	Tries: Reagan Campbell-Gillard, Tyrone May; Goals: Nathan Cleary (2/2)	Attendance: 14,423; Referee: Matt Cecchin, Alan Shortall

* 13 May - Manly home game despite playing Brisbane Broncos in Brisbane. Match played as part of an NRL double header at Suncorp Stadium.
* 1 July - Manly home game played in Perth.

=== Finals ===
Qualifying and elimination finals
9 September – Melbourne
1	Melbourne Storm	18
4	Parramatta Eels	16
10 September – Sydney
5	Cronulla-Sutherland Sharks	14
8	North Queensland Cowboys	15
9 September – Sydney
6	Manly-Warringah Sea Eagles	10
7	Penrith Panthers	22
8 September – Sydney
2	Sydney Roosters	24
3	Brisbane Broncos	22

Semi-finals
16 September – Sydney
Parramatta Eels	16
North Queensland Cowboys	24
15 September – Brisbane
Brisbane Broncos	13
Penrith Panthers	6

Preliminary finals
22 September – Melbourne
Melbourne Storm	30
Brisbane Broncos	0
23 September – Sydney
Sydney Roosters	16
North Queensland Cowboys	29

Grand final
1 October – Sydney
Melbourne Storm	34
North Queensland Cowboys	6

Saturday 9 September	Manly-Warringah Sea Eagles	10-22	Penrith Panthers	Allianz Stadium, Sydney
	Tries: Lewis Brown, Dylan Walker; Goals: Matthew Wright (1/2)	[ Report]	Tries: Bryce Cartwright (2), Tyrone Peachey; Goals: Nathan Cleary (5/5)	Attendance: 15,408; Referee: Gerard Sutton, Adam Gee

== Player statistics ==
Note: Games and (sub) show total games played, e.g. 1 (1) is 2 games played.

Player	Games (sub)	Tries	Goals	FG	Points
(Australia) Billy Bainbridge	(2)				
(New Zealand) Lewis Brown	1 (14)				
(Australia) Daly Cherry-Evans (c)	17	2	4/6	2	18
(Australia) Cameron Cullen	(3)				
(Tonga) Addin Fonua-Blake	1 (16)				
(Australia) Blake Green	17	3			12
(Samoa) Pita Godinet					
(Australia) Jackson Hastings	(10)	1	2/2		8
(Australia) Brian Kelly	17	6			24
(Australia) Jarrad Kennedy	(1)				
(Fiji) Apisai Koroisau	17	3	1/2		14
(Australia) Shaun Lane	2 (1)	1			4
(Australia) Brenton Lawrence	17	3			12
(Australia) Darcy Lussick	1 (5)				
(Australia) Nate Myles	2 (8)				
(Australia) Brad Parker	(2)				
(New Zealand) Lloyd Perrett	(8)				
(Australia) Curtis Sironen	14	3			12
(Tonga) Jorge Taufua	13	8			32
(New Zealand) Martin Taupau	15	1			4
(Australia) Jake Trbojevic (vc)	16	5			20
(Australia) Tom Trbojevic	15	8			32
(Fiji) Akuila Uate	16	11			44
(Australia) Dylan Walker	17	9	28/46		92
(Samoa) Frank Winterstein	17	1			4
(Samoa) Matthew Wright	8	3	18/25		48
(Australia) Jonathan Wright					
TOTAL		TBD	TBD	TBD	TBD

- On 8 June, Manly released Nate Myles from the remainder of his contract. 5 days later he announced that he had signed with the Melbourne Storm.

== Representative Players ==
=== International ===
- Australia – Jake Trbojevic
- Fiji – Apisai Koroisau, Akuila Uate*
- New Zealand – Martin Taupau
- Samoa – Pita Godinet
- Tonga – Addin Fonua-Blake

* Akuila Uate selected in Fiji squad for their game against Tonga, but did not play.

=== State of Origin ===
- New South Wales – Jake Trbojevic, Tom Trbojevic*
- Queensland – Nate Myles

* Tom Trbojevic named as 20th man for Games 2 and 3 of the State of Origin series.

=== City vs Country Origin ===
- City – Curtis Sironen
- Country – Brian Kelly
