= Billy Bainbridge =

Australian rugby league footballer

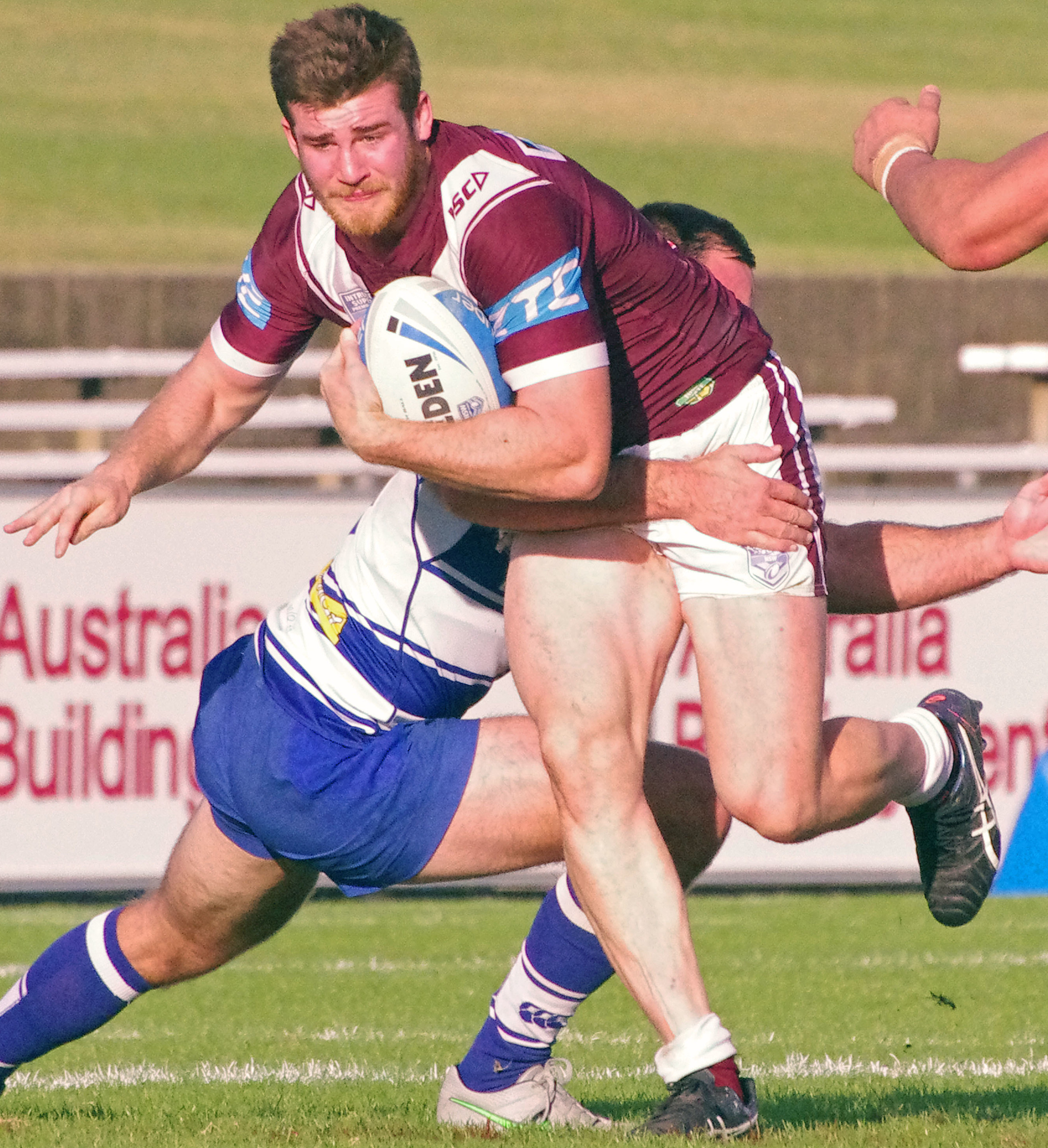

Personal information
- Full name: William Bainbridge
- Born: 9 September 1997 (age 28) Cromer, New South Wales, Australia
- Height: 180 cm (5 ft 11 in)
- Weight: 98 kg (15 st 6 lb)

Playing information
- Position: Second-row, Lock
Club
Years	Team	Pld	T	G	FG	P
2016–17	Manly Sea Eagles	3	0	0	0	0
- Source: As of 14 November 2018

Billy Bainbridge (born 9 September 1997) is an Australian professional rugby league footballer who plays as a second-row and lock for the Manly Warringah Sea Eagles in the National Rugby League.

== Background ==
Bainbridge was born in Cromer, New South Wales, Australia.

He played his junior rugby league for the Manly Christian Brothers, before being signed by the Manly Warringah Sea Eagles.

== Playing career ==
=== 2015 ===
In 2015 and 2016, Bainbridge played for the Manly Warringah Sea Eagles' NYC team. In August 2015, he re-signed with the Manly club on a two-year contract until the end of 2017.

=== 2016 ===
In round 26 of the 2016 NRL season, Bainbridge made his NRL debut for the Manly club against Penrith.

=== 2017 ===
Bainbridge was contracted with Manly in 2017 but spent the entire season playing for the clubs feeder side the Blacktown Workers Sea Eagles in the NSW Cup.
