= Moses Suli =

Tonga international rugby league footballer

Mosese Suli
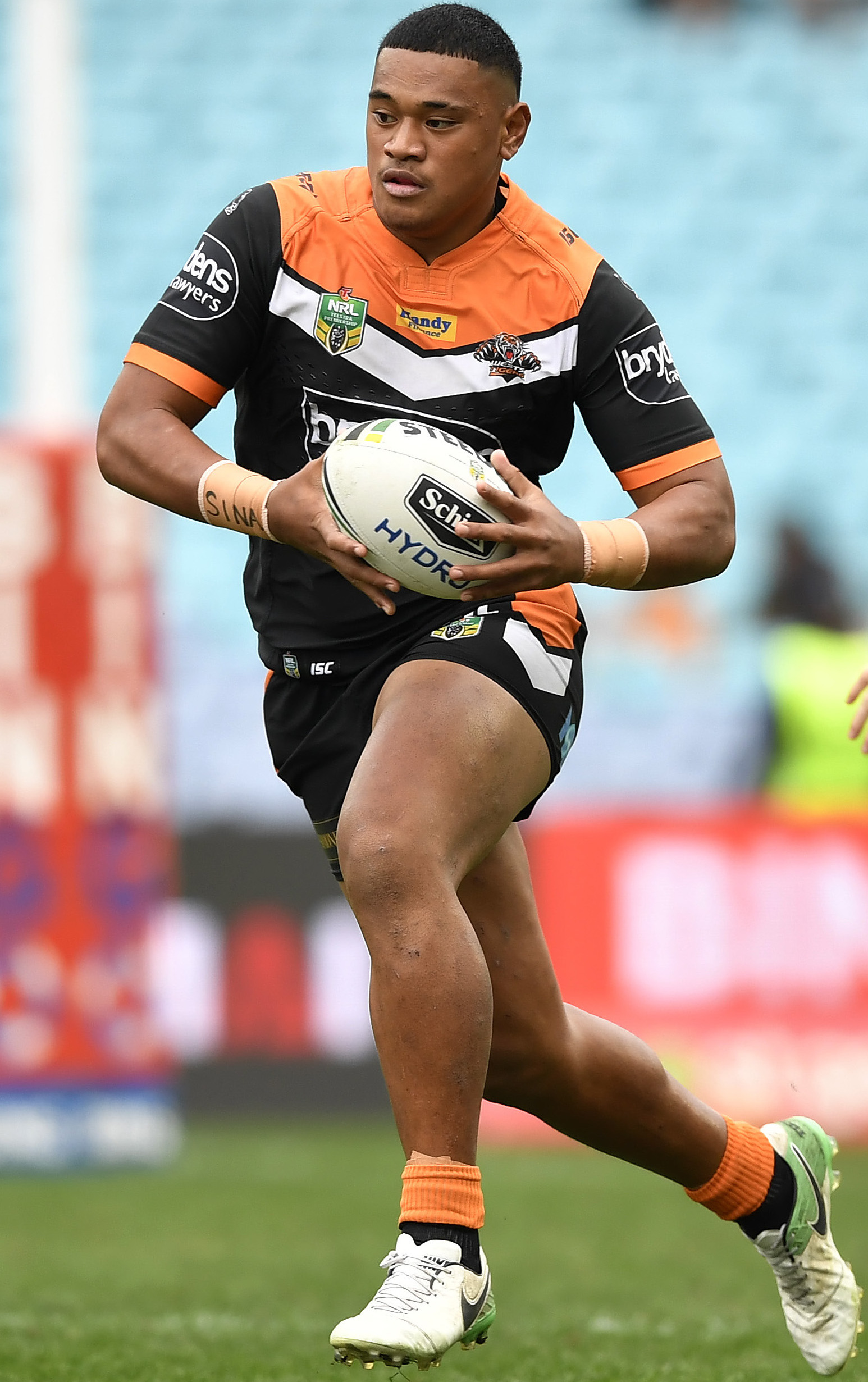

Personal information
- Full name: Mosese Suli
- Born: 9 June 1998 (age 28) Sydney, New South Wales, Australia
- Height: 189 cm (6 ft 2 in)
- Weight: 109 kg (17 st 2 lb)

Playing information
- Position: Centre, Wing
Club
Years	Team	Pld	T	G	FG	P
2017	Wests Tigers	16	2	0	0	8
2018–21	Manly Sea Eagles	63	12	0	0	48
2022–	St. George Illawarra	93	15	0	0	60
	Total	172	29	0	0	116
Representative
Years	Team	Pld	T	G	FG	P
2017–24	Tonga	10	1	0	0	4
- Source: As of 5 September 2026

Mosese "Moses" Suli (born 9 June 1998) is a Tonga international rugby league footballer who plays as a centre and winger for the St. George Illawarra Dragons in the National Rugby League (NRL).

Suli previously played for the Wests Tigers, was signed by the Canterbury-Bankstown Bulldogs before his contract was terminated ahead of the 2018 NRL season for repeated indiscretions during pre-season, he then joined Manly Warringah Sea Eagles.

== Background ==
Suli was born in Geelong Crescent in St John's Park Fairfield, Sydney, Australia. He is of Tongan descent.

He played his junior rugby league for Fairfield United. He was then signed by the Wests Tigers. Suli later said, "I got axed by Parra in Harold Matthews when I was 16. They actually wanted me back but I just didn’t want to go back. I just said I wasn’t interested. I was going good at the Tigers and I just wanted to stay here."

== Playing career ==
=== 2016 ===
In 2016 Suli played for the Wests Tigers' NYC team.

=== 2017 ===
In January Suli re-signed with the Tigers on a three-year contract until the end of 2020.

In round 1 of the 2017 NRL season, he made his NRL debut for the Tigers against the South Sydney Rabbitohs, scoring a try. The Daily Telegraph said, "Apart from owning wonderful speed, footwork and vision, Suli is also larger than your favourite reality TV star’s ego. Truly, this young bloke is the real deal. A genuine Next Big Thing."

=== 2018 ===
On January 31 Suli was released by the Wests Tigers. It was reported that Suli would only attend training sessions for five minutes, and would sleep in a teammates car while the team was training.

He was quickly signed by the Canterbury-Bankstown Bulldogs. However, 28 days later, his new contract was terminated by the Belmore-based club following repeated indiscretions. It was revealed he had been given two warnings in his first two weeks at the club.

Suli subsequently joined Manly-Warringah, making his debut in round 9. By round 14, he had been dropped again after misplacing his passport and missing training in New Zealand.

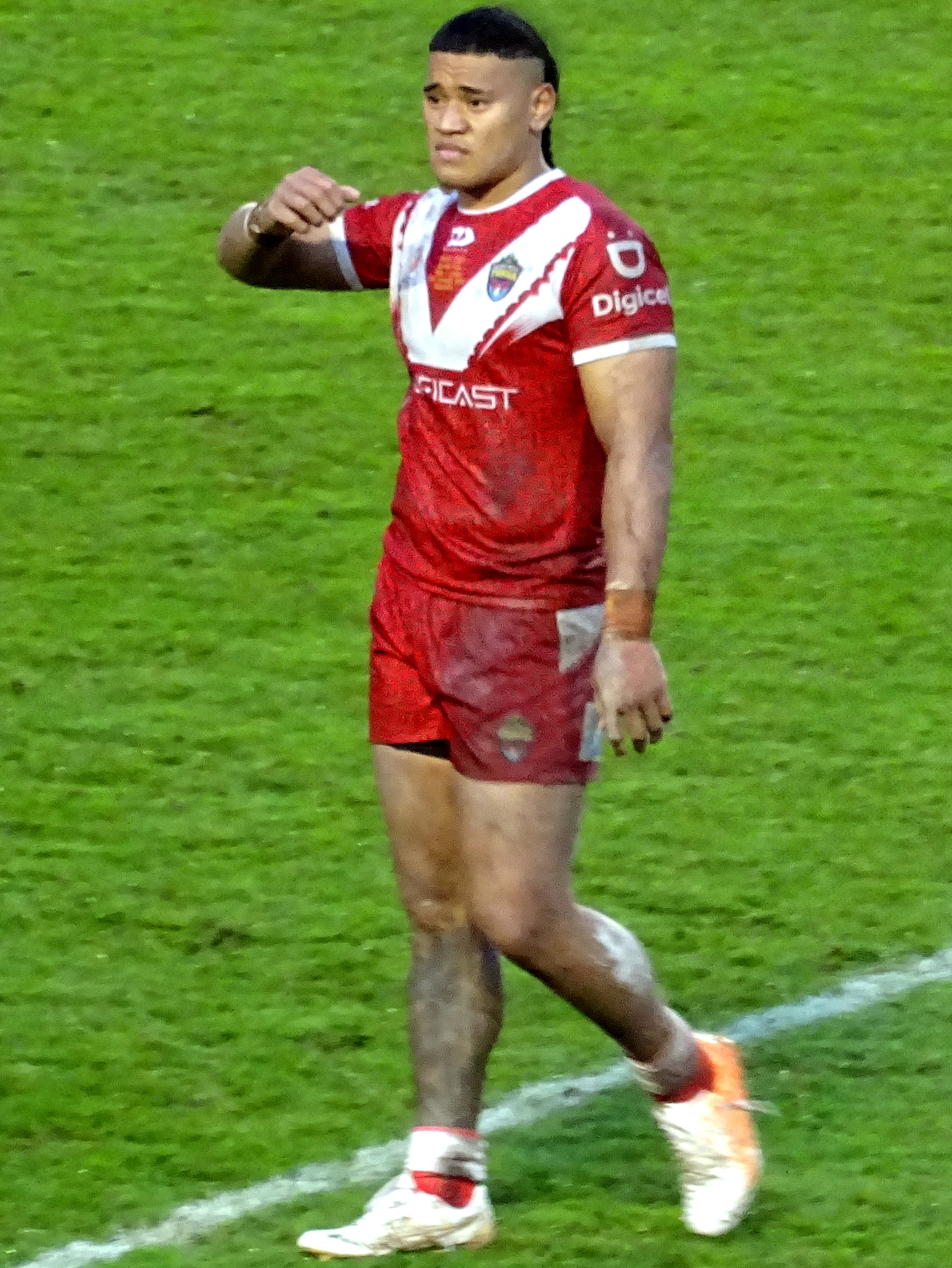
Suli after Tonga were knocked out of the 2021 RLWC

=== 2019 ===
On 2 April Suli was dropped from the Manly side for the club's Round 4 match against South Sydney for failing to meet the club's disciplinary standards.

Suli made a total of 22 appearances for Manly and scored 6 tries as the club finished 6th on the table and qualified for the finals. Suli played in both finals games for the club and scored a try in each match as they were eliminated in the semi-final by South Sydney at ANZ Stadium.

=== 2020 ===
In round 16 Suli was taken from the field during Manly's 56–16 loss against South Sydney. He was later ruled out for the rest of the season with injury. He made a total of 13 appearances for Manly scoring two tries.

=== 2021 ===
In round 22 Suli came on as 18th man in Manly's 56–10 victory over Parramatta and scored two tries.

Suli played a total of 13 games for Manly in 2021, including the club's preliminary final loss against South Sydney. On 6 October, he was released early from his contract to join St. George Illawarra.

=== 2022 ===
Suli made his club debut for St. George Illawarra in round 1 of the 2022 NRL season against the New Zealand Warriors. On 19 July, it was confirmed that Suli had suffered a leg injury and would be told that he would return during the NRL Finals.

Suli played 17 games for the club throughout 2022 as they finished 10th on the table and missed the finals for a fourth straight season.

In October he was named in the Tonga squad for the 2021 Rugby League World Cup.

=== 2023 ===
In round 10 of the 2023 NRL season, Suli was responsible for one of the bombed tries of the year with one minute remaining as St. George Illawarra lost 16–18 against the bottom placed Wests Tigers. The ball had found Suli with an unmarked Mikaele Ravalawa on his outside. Suli elected to run the ball but then attempted a flick pass which went to ground. Ravalawa picked up the loose ball but was then bundled into touch.. A week later he scored the opening try for the St. George Illawarra Dragons in a 95 m effort against the Sydney Roosters in their 24–22 win. Suli played a total of 22 games in the 2023 NRL season as St. George Illawarra finished 16th on the table.

=== 2024 ===
Suli played 19 games for St. George Illawarra in the 2024 NRL season as the club finished 11th on the table.

=== 2025 ===
Suli played 20 matches for St. George Illawarra in the 2025 NRL season as the club finished a disappointing 15th on the table, with Suli managing only a single try all season.

=== 2026 ===
Suli played 13 matches for St. George Illawarra in the 2026 NRL season as the club finished with the Wooden Spoon. It was the first time any St. George affiliated side had come last since 1938.

== Statistics ==
Year	Team	Games	Tries	Pts
2017	Wests Tigers	16	2	8
2018	Manly Warringah Sea Eagles	15	1	4
2019	Manly Warringah Sea Eagles	22	6	24
2020	Manly Warringah Sea Eagles	13	2	8
2021	Manly Warringah Sea Eagles	17	3	12
2022	St. George Illawarra Dragons	17	5	20
2023	St. George Illawarra Dragons	22	2	8
2024	St. George Illawarra Dragons	19	3	12
2025	St. George Illawarra Dragons	20	1	4
2026 *	St. George Illawarra Dragons	3	1	4
	Totals	160	26	104

* denotes season still competing

source;
