= Joel Thompson (rugby league) =

Australian rugby league footballer

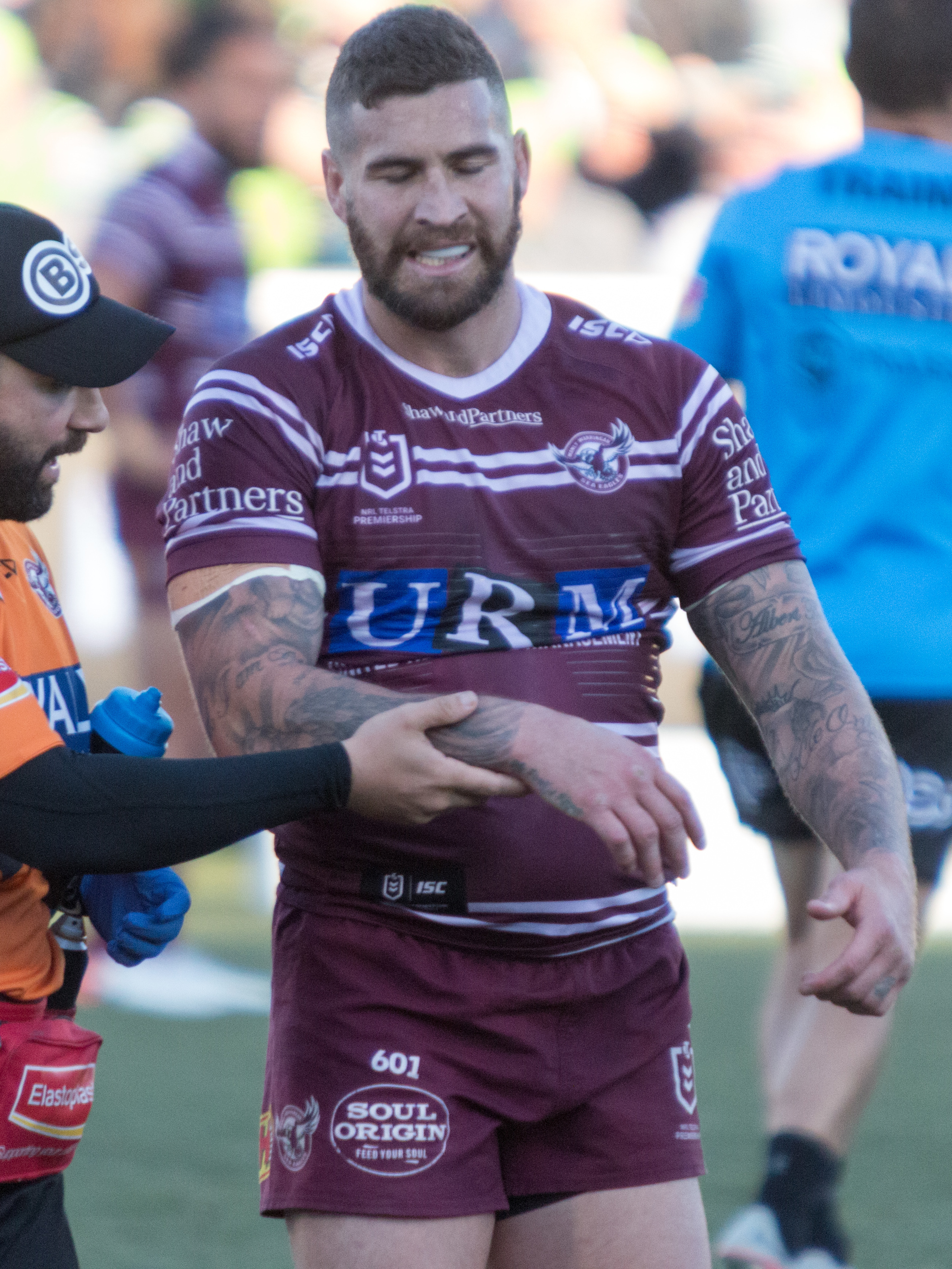

Personal information
- Born: 24 August 1988 (age 38) Ivanhoe, New South Wales, Australia
- Height: 6 ft 3 in (1.90 m)
- Weight: 16 st 3 lb (103 kg)

Playing information
- Position: Second-row, Centre
Club
Years	Team	Pld	T	G	FG	P
2008–13	Canberra Raiders	89	28	0	0	112
2014–17	St. George Illawarra	86	19	0	0	76
2018–20	Manly Sea Eagles	60	16	0	0	64
2021	St Helens	19	1	0	0	4
	Total	254	64	0	0	256
Representative
Years	Team	Pld	T	G	FG	P
2009	Queensland Residents	1	0	0	0	0
2010–20	Indigenous All Stars	7	0	0	0	0
2011–15	Country Origin	2	0	0	0	0
- Source: As of 5 January 2024

Joel Thompson (born 24 August 1988) is a retired Australian professional rugby league footballer who played as a second-row forward for St Helens in the Super League, and for the Canberra Raiders, St George Illawarra Dragons and the Manly Warringah Sea Eagles in the National Rugby League (NRL). Thompson has played for the Indigenous All stars and NSW Country Origin side at representative level, and played as a centre in the NRL earlier in his career.

== Background ==
Thompson was born in Ivanhoe, New South Wales, Australia and is of Indigenous Australian descent and English descent.

Thompson played his junior rugby league for the Ivanhoe Roosters and Forbes Magpies and attended Red Bend Catholic College before being signed by the Canberra Raiders. He represented the Australian Schoolboys in 2006 and played for the Junior Kangaroos in 2007.

== Playing career ==
=== 2008 ===
In the 2008 NRL season, Thompson played in the Canberra Raiders NYC team, being named at second-row in the 2008 NYC Team of the Year. In round 26 of the 2008 NRL season, Thompson made his NRL debut for Canberra against the Canterbury-Bankstown Bulldogs off the interchange bench in the 52–34 win at Canberra Stadium. This was Thompson's only NRL match for the Raiders in the 2008 NRL season.

=== 2009 ===
On 2 February 2009, Thompson was stood down from the Raiders squad pending the outcome of an assault allegation on his girlfriend. Thompson was later proven not guilty and returned towards the end of the season in round 18 against the Newcastle Knights playing off the interchange bench in the club's 23–4 loss at Hunter Stadium. In round 22 against the Canterbury-Bankstown Bulldogs, Thompson scored his first NRL career try in the club's 23–20 loss at ANZ Stadium. Thompson played in 9 matches and scored 2 tries for the Raiders in the 2009 NRL season.

=== 2010 ===
On 13 February 2010, Thompson was selected for the inaugural Indigenous All Stars team against the NRL All Stars at Cbus Super Stadium, playing off the interchange bench in the 16–12 loss. Thompson played in 15 matches and scored 10 tries for Canberra in the 2010 NRL season. Thompson season ended in round 17 against the Sydney Roosters after succumbing to a groin injury in the 22–12 win at Canberra Stadium. On 10 September 2010, Thompson re-signed with Canberra to the end of the 2013 NRL season.

=== 2011 ===
On 12 February 2011, Thompson was again selected for the Indigenous All Stars team for the NRL All Stars match at Cbus Super Stadium, playing off the interchange bench in the 28–12 loss. On 6 May 2011, Thompson was selected for the NSW Country Origin team against the NSW City Origin at centre in the 18–12 win at Lavington Sports Ground in Albury, New South Wales. Thompson played in 21 matches and scored 6 tries for the Raiders in the 2011 NRL season.

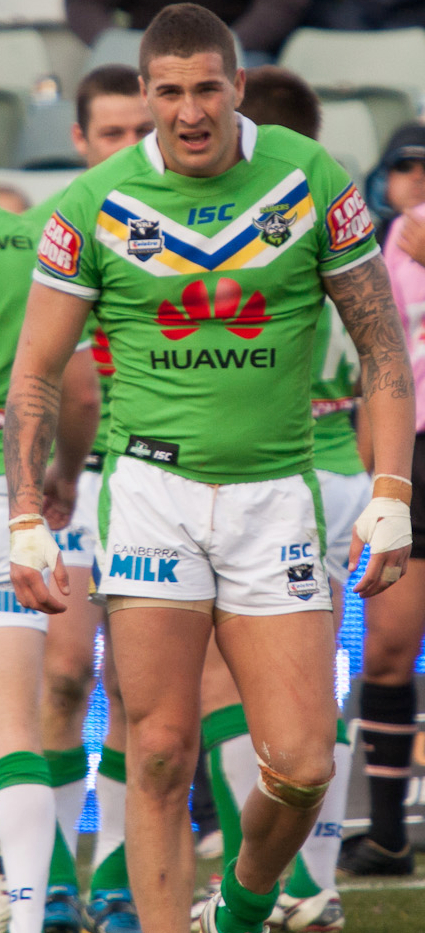
Thompson playing for Canberra in 2012

=== 2012 ===
On 4 February 2012, Thompson was selected for the Indigenous All Stars team against the NRL All Stars at Cbus Super Stadium, playing off the interchange bench in the 36–28 loss. Thompson played in 25 matches and scored 7 tries for Canberra in the 2012 NRL season.

=== 2013 ===
On 9 February 2013, Thompson was selected for the Indigenous All Stars team against the NRL All Stars at Suncorp Stadium, playing at second-row in the 32–6 win. On 18 April 2013, it was announced that Thompson had signed a 3-year contract to join the St. George Illawarra Dragons worth $1.3M, starting in 2014. Thompson played 18 matches and scored 8 tries in his last year with the Canberra Raiders in the 2013 NRL season.

=== 2014 ===
In February 2014, Thompson was selected for the St George Illawarra Dragons inaugural Auckland Nines squad. In Round 1 of the 2014 NRL season, Thompson made his club debut for the St George Illawarra Dragons against the Wests Tigers, playing off the interchange bench in the 44–24 win at ANZ Stadium. On 11 May 2014, it was rumoured that Thompson was seeking a return to the Canberra Raiders but later decided to stay at St. George. In round 13 against the Cronulla-Sutherland Sharks, Thompson played his 100th NRL career match in the 30–0 win at WIN Stadium. In round 21 against the Sydney Roosters, Thompson scored his first club try for the club in the 30–22 loss at the Sydney Football Stadium. Thompson finished off his first year with the St George Illawarra Dragons in the 2014 season with him playing in 23 matches and scoring 3 tries.

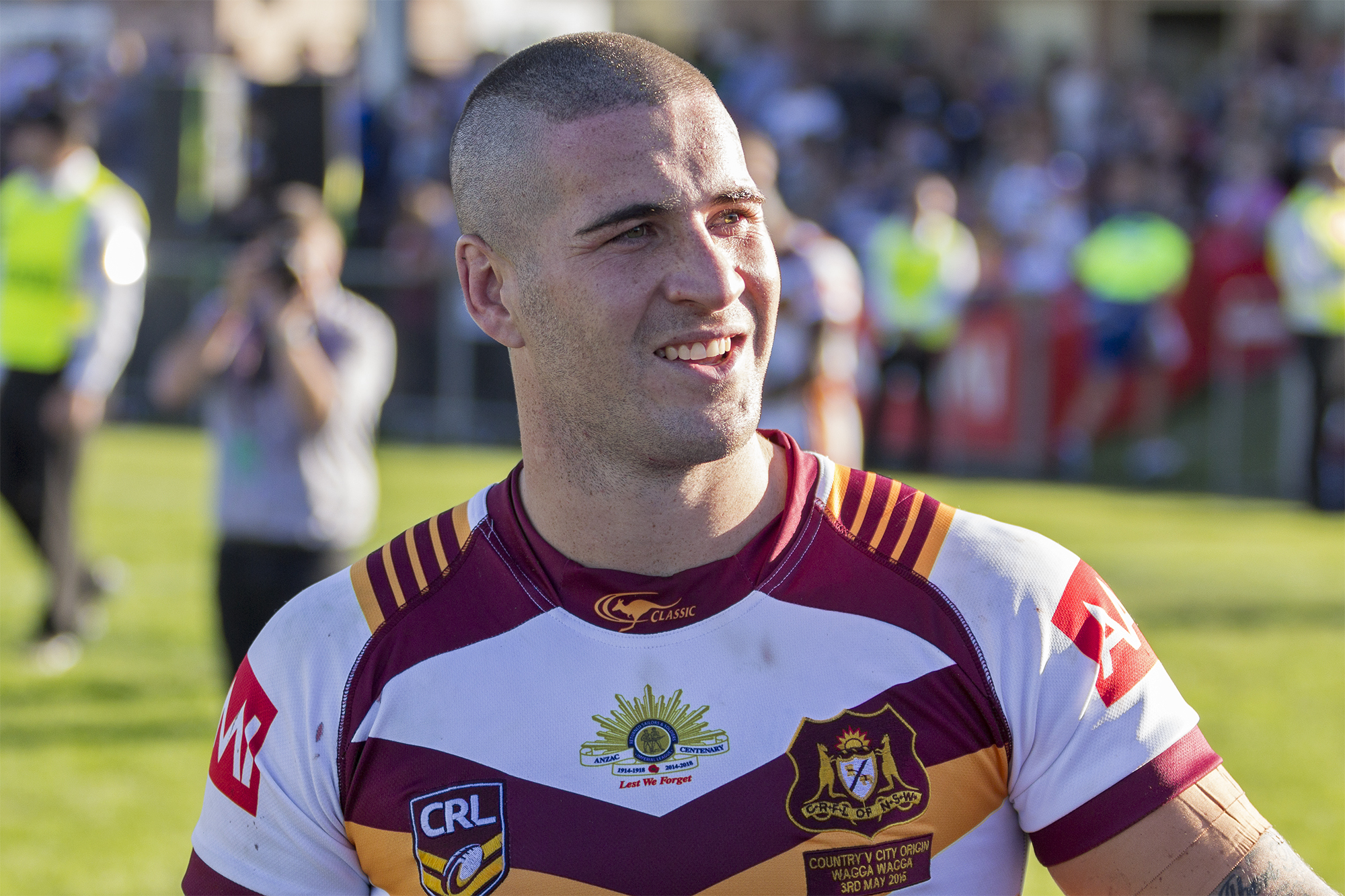
Thompson playing for Country in the 2015 City vs Country Origin

=== 2015 ===
On 21 January 2015, Thompson was named in St. George's 2015 NRL Auckland Nines squad. On 3 May 2015, Thompson played for NSW Country Origin against NSW City Origin in the 2015 City vs Country Origin, playing at second-row in the 34–22 win at Wagga Wagga. Thompson finished the 2015 NRL season with him playing in 19 matches and scoring 3 tries for the Dragons. On 15 December 2015, Thompson was named at second-row for the Indigenous All Stars team to play against the NRL All Stars on 13 February 2016.

=== 2016 ===
On 13 February 2016, Thompson played for the Indigenous All Stars against the World All Stars, starting at second-row in the 12–8 loss at Suncorp Stadium. In round 2, after St. George's woeful 30–2 loss to arch rivals the Cronulla-Sutherland Sharks at Shark Park, Thompson taken to Twitter to have a rant about his frustration lack of post-match security after his wife and daughter were intimidated in the car park by a drunken Sharks supporter, saying in his tweet, "Happy to cop abuse especially after that game", ”Drunken Sharks fans are a disgrace, Coming over threatening to piss on my car, Swearing in front of my two-year-old girl. Hard to take in front of my family. You're very lucky there are consequences if I reacted how I wanted to, I'm filthy." On 2 August 2016, Thompson extended his contract with the Dragons to the end of the 2018 season. In Round 25 against the Parramatta Eels, Thompson played his 150th NRL career match in the club's 30–18 loss at Parramatta Stadium. Thompson finished the 2016 NRL season with him playing in 20 matches and scoring 3 tries for the Saints.

=== 2017 ===
On 10 February 2017, Thompson played for the Indigenous All Stars against the World All Stars in the 2017 All Stars match, starting at second-row in the 34–8 win at Hunter Stadium. In Round 1 against the Penrith Panthers, Thompson scored his first career hattrick of tries in the Dragons impressive 42–10 win at Jubilee Oval. Thompson finished the 2017 NRL season with him playing in 24 matches and scoring 9 tries for the club. On 22 December 2017, Thompson was granted a release from his final year of contract with St. George to sign a 2-year deal with the Manly-Warringah Sea Eagles, starting in 2018.

=== 2018 ===
In round 1 of the 2018 NRL season, Thompson made his club debut with the Manly-Warringah Sea Eagles against the Newcastle Knights, starting at second-row in the 19-18 golden point extra time loss at Hunter Stadium. He scored his first try for Manly in the 12–38 loss to the Wests Tigers. He scored a double against the Brisbane Broncos in the round 10 win. At the end of the 2018 NRL season Thompson finished with 24 games and 7 tries.

=== 2019 ===
Thompson made 22 appearances for Manly in the 2019 NRL season as the club finished 6th on the table and qualified for the finals. Thompson missed the finals series however as he sustained a broken arm in round 23 against Canberra.

On 9 October, Thompson was airlifted to the Royal North Shore Hospital in Sydney after falling over and hitting his head in what the player described as a "a real bad accident". Thompson then posted a photo of himself on Instagram lying in a hospital bed in a neck brace and with tubes connected through his mouth. Underneath the photo was a caption saying "Hey everyone I’ve had a real bad accident – won’t be talking to anyone for another week. Big lesson learnt around drinking and partying... Thinking of you all".

=== 2020 ===
In October 2020, it was announced that Thompson would join St Helens on a two-year deal starting in 2021.

=== 2021 ===
In round 1 of the 2021 Super League season, he made his debut for St. Helens in their 29–6 victory over Salford.

On 22 June, Thompson announced he would retire at the end of the 2021 Super League season.

On 17 July, he played for St. Helens in their 26-12 2021 Challenge Cup Final victory over Castleford. Thompson did not play for St. Helens in their 2021 Super League Grand Final victory over Catalans Dragons.
