= Brad Parker (rugby league) =

Australian rugby league footballer (born 1997)

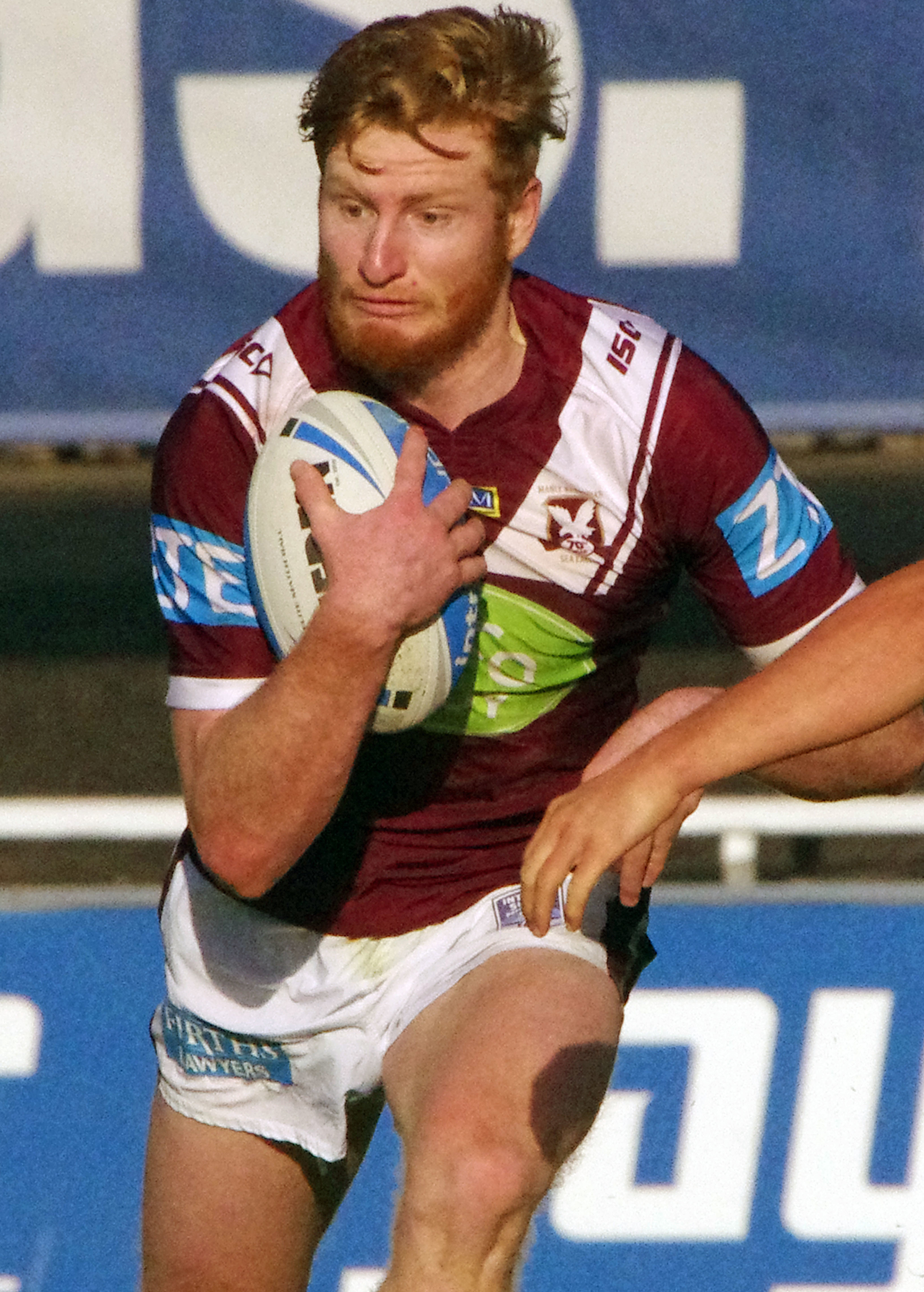

Personal information
- Full name: Bradley Parker
- Born: 19 February 1997 (age 29) Sydney, New South Wales, Australia

Playing information
- Height: 193 cm (6 ft 4 in)
- Weight: 100 kg (15 st 10 lb)
- Position: Centre, Wing
Club
Years	Team	Pld	T	G	FG	P
2016–23	Manly Sea Eagles	117	29	0	0	116
Representative
Years	Team	Pld	T	G	FG	P
2019	Prime Minister's XIII	1	0	0	0	0

Brad Parker (born 19 February 1997) is an Australian former professional rugby league footballer who last played as a centre for the Manly Warringah Sea Eagles in the National Rugby League (NRL).

== Background ==
Parker was born in the Northern Beaches of Sydney, New South Wales, Australia.

He played his junior rugby league for the Manly Christian Brothers, before being signed by the Manly Warringah Sea Eagles.

== Playing career ==
=== Early career ===
In 2015 and 2016, Parker played for the Manly-Warringah Sea Eagles' NYC team. On 18 August 2015, he re-signed with Manly on a two-year contract until the end of 2017.

=== 2016 ===
In round 19 of the 2016 NRL season, Parker made his NRL debut for Manly-Warringah against the New Zealand Warriors. Parker got both his first and second try in the round 24 clash with the Melbourne Storm at Brookvale Oval.

=== 2017 ===
On the August 8, 2017, Parker signed a new deal with the club keeping him there till the end of 2019.“Manly is the team want to stay at, it’s the team I have gone for my whole life,” Parker said. Parker injured himself in the round 24 clash with the Wests Tigers. Results of the scan revealed Parker has a lateral meniscus tear suffered in the loss at Leichhardt Oval. Parker sat out for the rest of the season with the injury. In the 2017 season Parker played 4 games scoring 1 try with the Manly Warringah Sea Eagles.

=== 2018 ===
Parker made 17 appearances for Manly in 2018 as the club narrowly avoided the wooden spoon by 2 competition points.

=== 2019 ===
Parker made 19 appearances for Manly in the 2019 NRL season as the club finished in sixth place and qualified for the finals. Parker scored a try in Manly's elimination final victory over Cronulla in week one of the finals series at Brookvale Oval. The following week in the elimination semi final, Parker scored a try but was later sin binned for tripping a South Sydney player in the club's 34-26 loss at ANZ Stadium.

On 30 September, Parker earned his first representative jersey as he was named at Centre for the Australia PM XIII side. On 7 October, Parker was named in the U23 Junior Australian side.

=== 2020 ===
Parker played 19 games in the 2020 NRL season. Manly missed out on the finals finishing a disappointing 13th on the table.

=== 2021 ===
In round 11 of the 2021 NRL season, Parker scored two tries for Manly-Warringah in a 28-6 victory over Parramatta. In round 14 against North Queensland, Parker scored two tries for Manly in a 50-18 victory. Parker played 25 games for Manly in the 2021 NRL season including the club's preliminary final loss against South Sydney.

=== 2022 ===
In round 8 of the 2022 NRL season, Parker was taken from the field during Manly's 40-22 loss against South Sydney. It was later revealed Parker would be ruled out for an indefinite period with an ACL injury.

=== 2023 ===
Parker played 19 matches for Manly in the 2023 NRL season as the club finished 12th on the table and missed the finals. Parker re-signed with Manly until the end of the 2025 season.

=== 2024 ===
Parker spent the 2024 season in NSW Cup, playing 22 games for Manly's feeder side Blacktown Workers Sea Eagles.

On 6 September 2024, Parker announced via Manly's Instagram that he was announcing his retirement at the end of the season, days prior team mate Aaron Woods announced his retirement from the NRL and confirmed that Parker would be retiring as well. Parker said that his body had broken down on him and the call to retire had come earlier then he would've liked

== Post playing ==
After retiring from the NRL, Parker revealed that he was going to work in commercial real estate.

== Statistics ==
=== First grade ===
Year	Team	Games	Tries	Pts
2016	Manly Warringah Sea Eagles	4	2	8
2017	Manly Warringah Sea Eagles	4	1	4
2018	Manly Warringah Sea Eagles	17	3	12
2019	Manly Warringah Sea Eagles	19	5	20
2020	Manly Warringah Sea Eagles	19	4	16
2021	Manly Warringah Sea Eagles	25	8	32
2022	Manly Warringah Sea Eagles	10	1	4
2023	Manly Warringah Sea Eagles	19	5	20
	Totals	117	29	116

=== Reserve grade ===
Year	Team	Games	Goals	Tries	Pts
2019	Blacktown Workers Sea Eagles	1			
2022	Blacktown Workers Sea Eagles	1			
2024	Blacktown Workers Sea Eagles	22	1	5	22
	Totals	25	1	5	30
