= Addin Fonua-Blake =

New Zealand and Tonga international rugby league footballer

Addin Fonua Blake
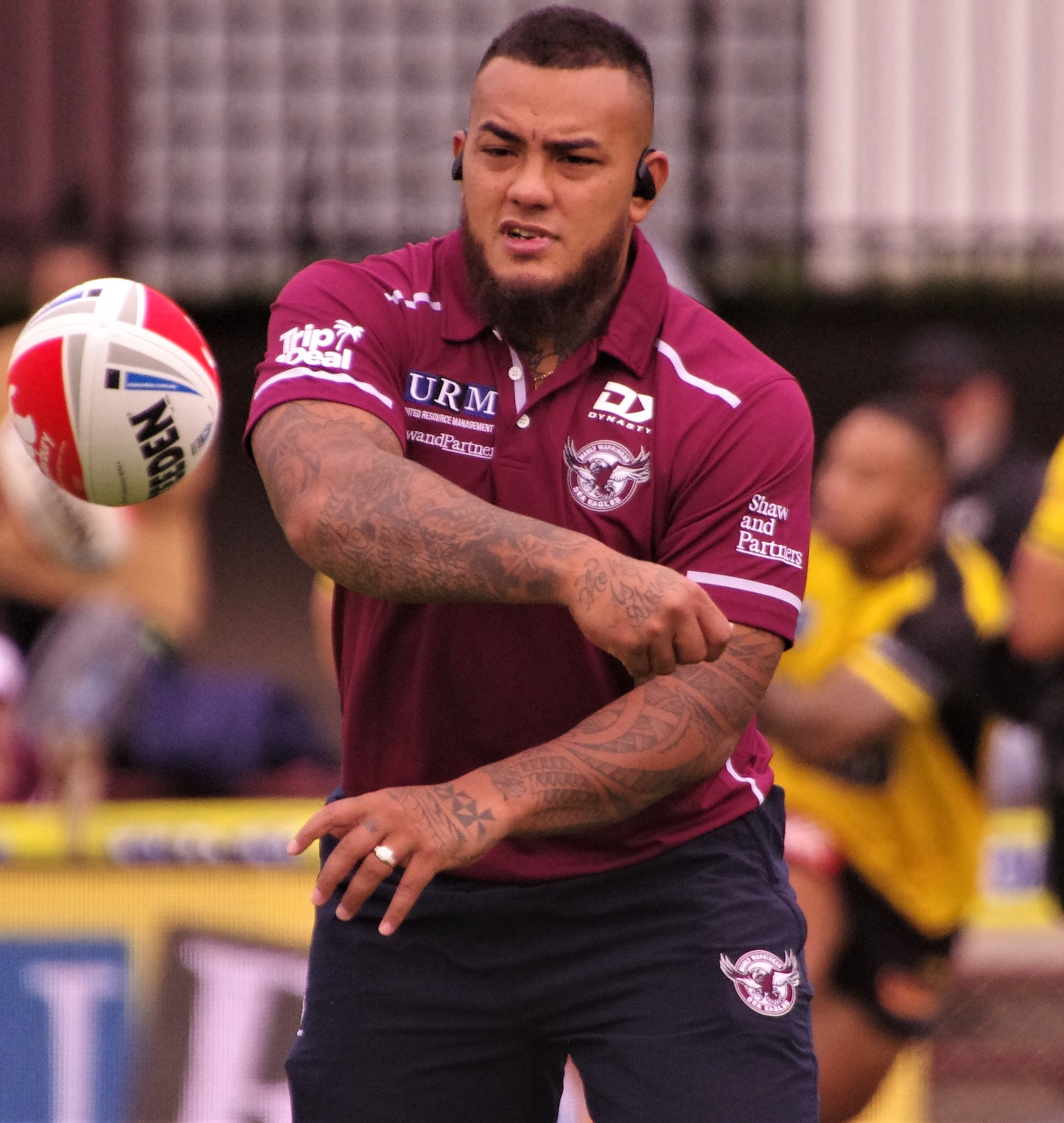

Personal information
- Full name: Addin Fonua-Blake
- Born: 6 November 1995 (age 31) Brisbane, Queensland, Australia
- Height: 189 cm (6 ft 2 in)
- Weight: 123 kg (19 st 5 lb)

Playing information
- Position: Prop
Club
Years	Team	Pld	T	G	FG	P
2016–20	Manly Sea Eagles	97	13	0	0	52
2021–24	New Zealand Warriors	85	19	0	0	76
2025–	Cronulla Sharks	50	8	0	0	32
	Total	232	40	0	0	160
Representative
Years	Team	Pld	T	G	FG	P
2017–	Tonga	20	2	0	0	8
2017	New Zealand	1	0	0	0	0
2026	New South Wales	3	0	0	0	0
- Source: As of 22 November 2026

Addin Fonua-Blake (born 6 November 1995) is a professional rugby league footballer who plays as a prop for the Cronulla-Sutherland Sharks in the National Rugby League (NRL). He has played for both Tonga and New Zealand at international level.

He previously played for the Manly Warringah Sea Eagles and New Zealand Warriors in the NRL.

== Background ==
Fonua-Blake was born in Brisbane, Queensland..

He is of New Zealand and Tongan descent

He lived in Queensland until he was five, playing his first junior rugby league for Logan Brothers before moving to Sydney.

In Sydney, he played his junior rugby league for the Mascot Jets, before being signed by the South Sydney Rabbitohs.

== Playing career ==
=== Early career ===
After playing lower grades with the South Sydney Rabbitohs in 2011 and Parramatta Eels in 2012, Fonua-Blake joined the St. George Illawarra Dragons in 2013. In 2013 and 2014, he played for St. George Illawarra's NYC team.

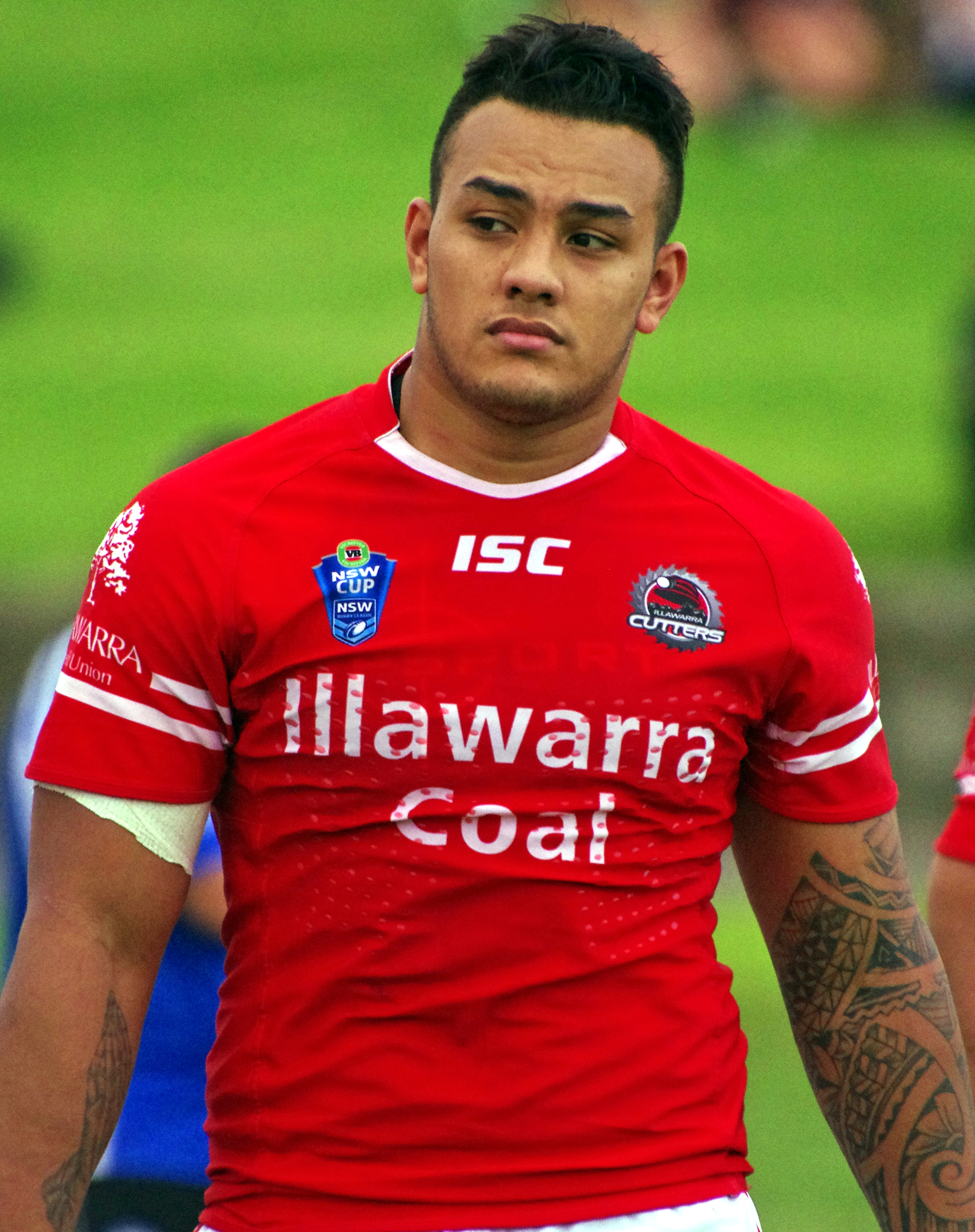
Fonua-Blake playing for the Illawarra Cutters in 2014

In 2014, he co-captained the side. On 2 September 2014, he was named on the interchange bench in the 2014 NYC Team of the Year.

On 18 October 2014, he played for the Junior Kiwis against the Junior Kangaroos, before re-signing with St. George Illawarra on a contract to the end of 2016. On 19 January 2015, he was stood down by the club due to disciplinary reasons, before having his contract terminated on 30 June 2015 when he pleaded guilty to assaulting his girlfriend. At the end of 2015, he was granted approval by the NRL to train with the Manly Warringah Sea Eagles from 1 November of the same year.

=== 2016 ===
After playing in five Intrust Super Premiership NSW matches for the Manly-Warringah club, Fonua-Blake was cleared to be eligible to play in the NRL after satisfying the NRL Integrity Unit that he had completed a comprehensive off-field counselling and development program. This allowed him to make his NRL debut for Manly-Warringah against the Parramatta Eels in Round 7 of the 2016 NRL season.

On 7 September, following the end to Manly's season (having finished 13th), Fonua-Blake was named in the New Zealand Kiwis train-on squad for the 2016 Four Nations tournament. Later on the same day, he won the Ken Arthurson Award as Manly's 2016 Rookie of the Year. He played in 14 games for Manly-Warringah in 2016, crossing for 2 tries (a double against the defending premiers North Queensland in Townsville).

=== 2017 ===
Fonua-Blake made 22 appearances for Manly in 2017 as the club finished 6th on the table and qualified for the finals. Fonua-Blake played in the elimination final against the Penrith Panthers which Penrith controversially won 22-12 as Tyrone Peachey scored the match winning try although replays had shown the player knocked the ball forwards with his hands.

=== 2018 ===
Fonua-Blake made 24 appearances for Manly in 2018. The club endured a horror season on and off the field narrowly avoiding the club's first wooden spoon by 2 competition points.

=== 2019 ===
Fonua-Blake made 22 appearances for Manly in the 2019 NRL season as the club finished sixth on the table. Fonua-Blake scored a try in Manly's week one elimination final victory over Cronulla at Brookvale Oval. Fonua-Blake played in Manly's elimination final defeat against South Sydney at ANZ Stadium the following week which ended their season.

=== 2020 ===
In round 8 of the 2020 NRL season, Fonua-Blake was sent off after full-time in the match against Newcastle after he called referee Grant Atkins a "fucking retard", and later a "spasticc". Fonua-Blake said this in response to Manly being denied a penalty try in the final moments of the match, which resulted in a 14-12 loss to the Newcastle Knights at Brookvale Oval.

On 16 September, Fonua-Blake handed in a transfer request despite having two years left on his contract. Fonua-Blake cited wanting to relocate out of Sydney with his young family for the decision.

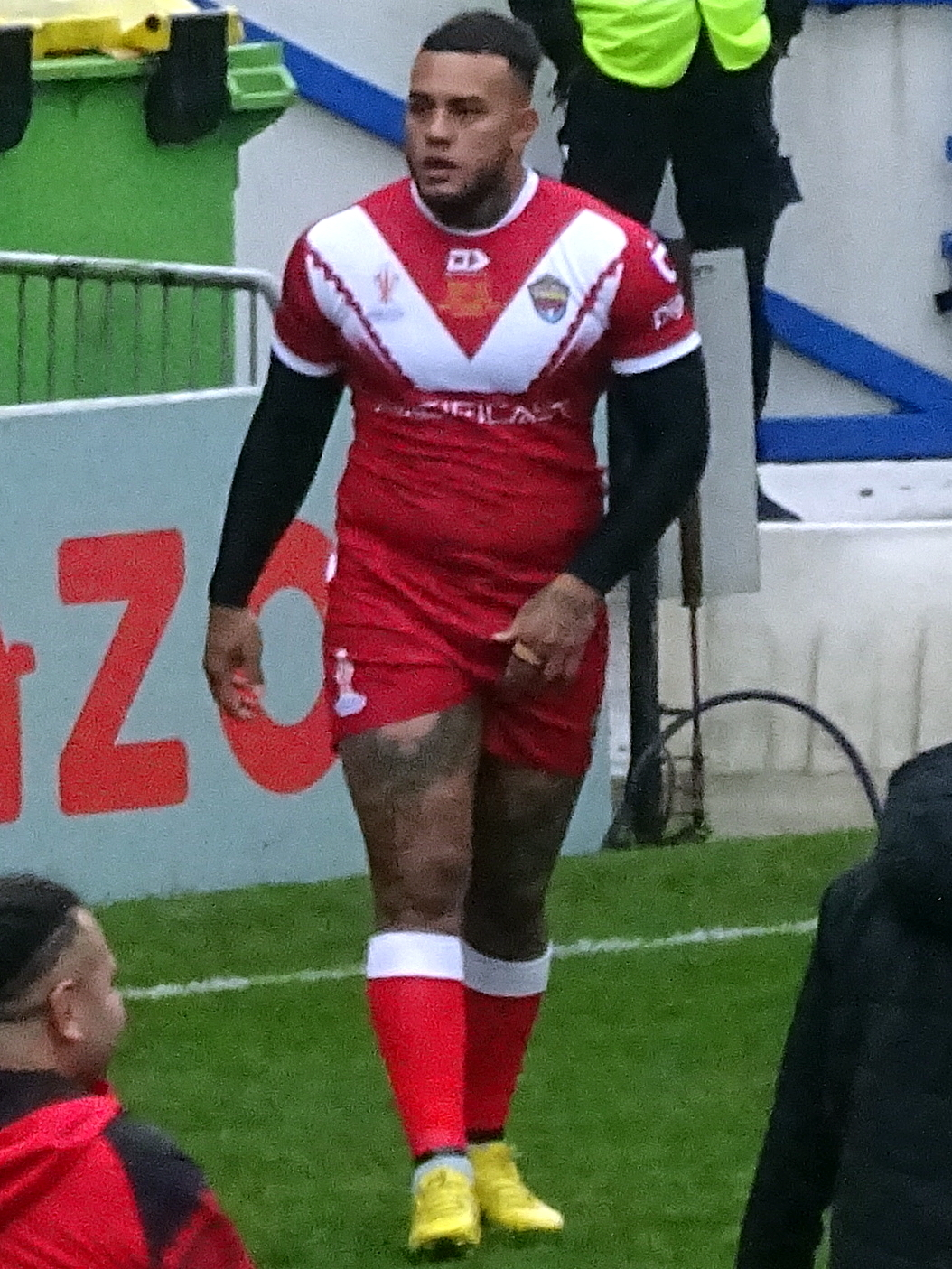
Fonua-Blake warming up for Tonga at the 2021 RLWC

On 22 September, he announced via his Instagram account that he has agreed to join the New Zealand Warriors from the 2021 NRL season, with Manly having agreed to terminate the remainder of his contract.

=== 2021 ===
Fonua-Blake played 15 games for New Zealand in the 2021 NRL season as the club missed the finals finishing 12th.

=== 2022 ===
On 26 May, it was announced that Fonua-Blake would be ruled out indefinitely from playing with a foot injury.

He made a total of 21 appearances for the New Zealand Warriors in the 2022 NRL season as they finished 15th on the table.

In October 2022 he was named in the Tonga squad for the 2021 Rugby League World Cup.

=== 2023 ===
Fonua-Blake played 26 games for the New Zealand Warriors in the 2023 NRL season as the club finished 4th on the table and qualified for the finals. He played in all three finals games as the club reached the preliminary final stage before being knocked out by Brisbane. In November, Fonua-Blake requested a release from the New Zealand Warriors to return to Sydney on a compassionate release. Fonua-Blake then committed to play out the 2024 season with the Warriors. On 19 December, Fonua-Blake signed a four-year deal to join Cronulla ahead of the 2025 NRL season.

=== 2024 ===
After the New Zealand Warriors Magic round win over the Penrith Panthers, Fonua-Blake skipped the teams post game de-brief and missed the team song. He was stood down from round 12 by coach Andrew Webster. He played 23 games for the New Zealand Warriors in the 2024 NRL season which saw the club finish 13th on the table. Fonua-Blake would play for Tonga in the Pacific Championships.

=== 2025 ===
Fonua-Blake made his club debut for Cronulla in round 1 of the 2025 NRL season against Penrith scoring a try during the clubs 28-22 loss. He played 27 matches for Cronulla in the 2025 NRL season as the club finished 5th on the table. The club reached the preliminary final for a second consecutive season but lost against Melbourne 22-14.

=== 2026 ===
He made his New South Wales debut in Game 1 of the 2026 State of Origin on 27 May 2026 in the 22-20 win. He played 23 games for Cronulla in the 2026 NRL season as the club finished 5th on the table and qualified for the finals.

== Statistics ==
Season	Team	Played	Tries	Pts
2016	Manly Warringah Sea Eagles	14	2	8
2017	Manly Warringah Sea Eagles	22		
2018	Manly Warringah Sea Eagles	24	3	12
2019	Manly Warringah Sea Eagles	22	5	20
2020	Manly Warringah Sea Eagles	15	3	12
2021	New Zealand Warriors	15	1	4
2022	New Zealand Warriors	21	1	4
2023	New Zealand Warriors	26	9	36
2024	New Zealand Warriors	23	8	32
2025	Cronulla-Sutherland Sharks	27	6	24
2026	Cronulla-Sutherland Sharks	23	2	8
2027	Cronulla-Sutherland Sharks			
	Career Totals	232	40	160

*denotes season competing

== Assault charge ==
In 2015, he pleaded guilty to assault charges after pushing and kicking his partner after a night out drinking. He was fined $1000, ordered to undergo counselling and given a one year suspended sentence.

His contract with St George Illawarra was also terminated.
