= Jorge Taufua =

Samoa & Tonga international rugby league footballer

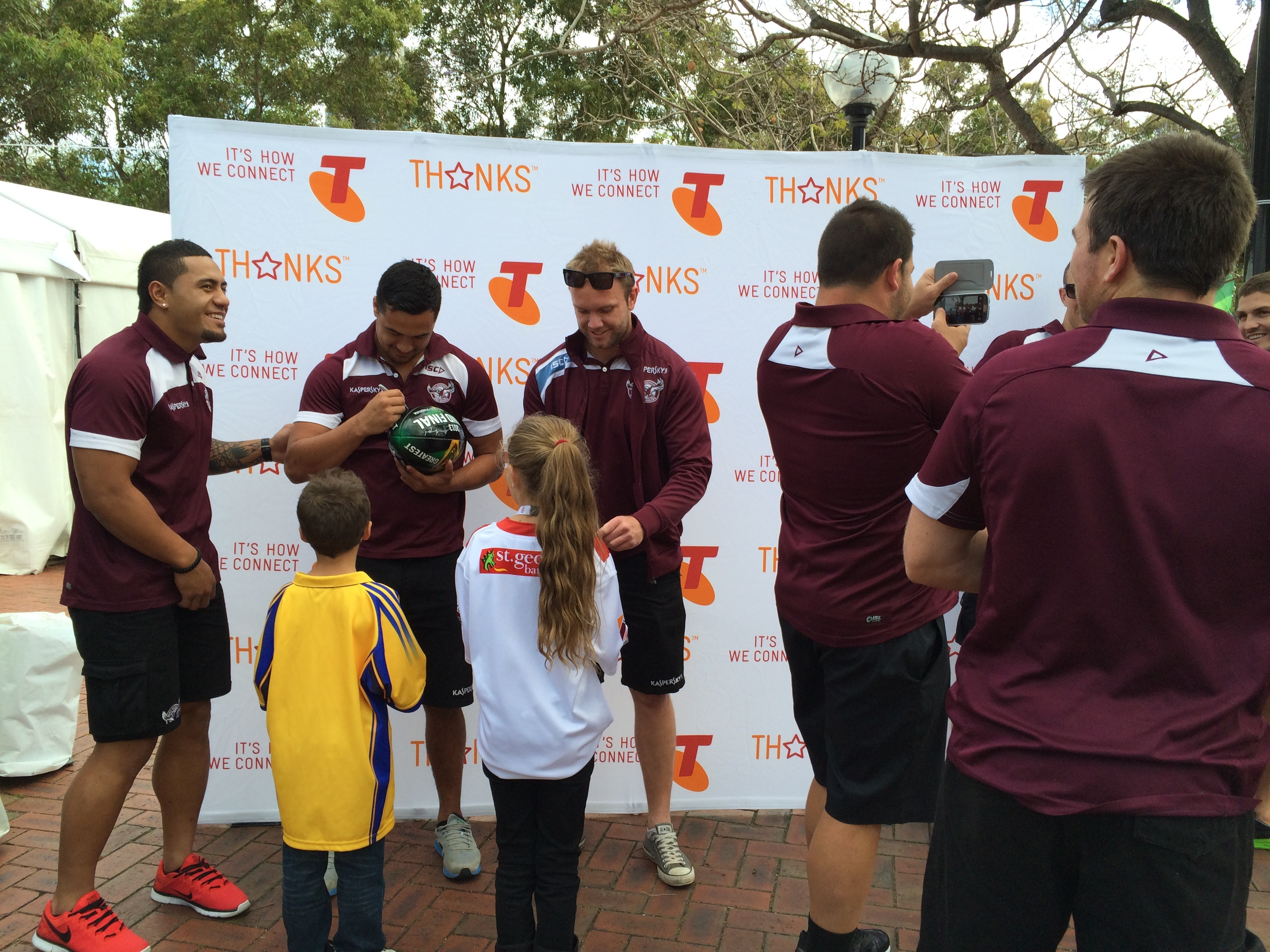

Personal information
- Born: 23 October 1991 (age 35) Canberra, Australian Capital Territory, Australia
- Height: 184 cm (6 ft 0 in)
- Weight: 105 kg (16 st 7 lb)

Playing information

Rugby league
- Position: Wing, Centre
Club
Years	Team	Pld	T	G	FG	P
2012–22	Manly Sea Eagles	161	87	0	0	348
2022–23	Wakefield Trinity	13	1	0	0	4
2023–25	Bradford Bulls	20	11	0	0	44
	Total	194	99	0	0	396
Representative
Years	Team	Pld	T	G	FG	P
2013–14	NSW City	2	0	0	0	0
2013–17	Tonga	3	1	0	0	4
2018–19	Samoa	3	3	0	0	12

Rugby union
Club
Years	Team	Pld	T	G	FG	P
2025–	Bradford Salem RFC
- Source: As of 22 November 2026

Jorge Taufua (/dʒɔːrdʒ təfuːə/) (born 23 October 1991) is a professional rugby league footballer who last played as a winger for Bradford Bulls in the Championship. He has played for both Tonga and Samoa at international level. He is currently playing rugby union for Bradford Salem RFC

Taufua has previously played for the Manly Warringah Sea Eagles in the NRL and for the New South Wales City side.

== Background ==
Taufua was born in Canberra, Australian Capital Territory, Australia to a Tongan father and a New Zealand mother of Samoan descent. Jorge has 12 siblings including his "half" siblings from his father's side, most of them were born in Canberra, Australian Capital Territory.

Taufua played his junior football for the Toongabbie Tigers and Wentworthville Magpies whilst attending The Hills Sports High School before being signed by the Parramatta Eels.

== Playing career ==
=== Early career ===
Taufua played for the Eels' Toyota Cup (Under-20s) team in 2010.

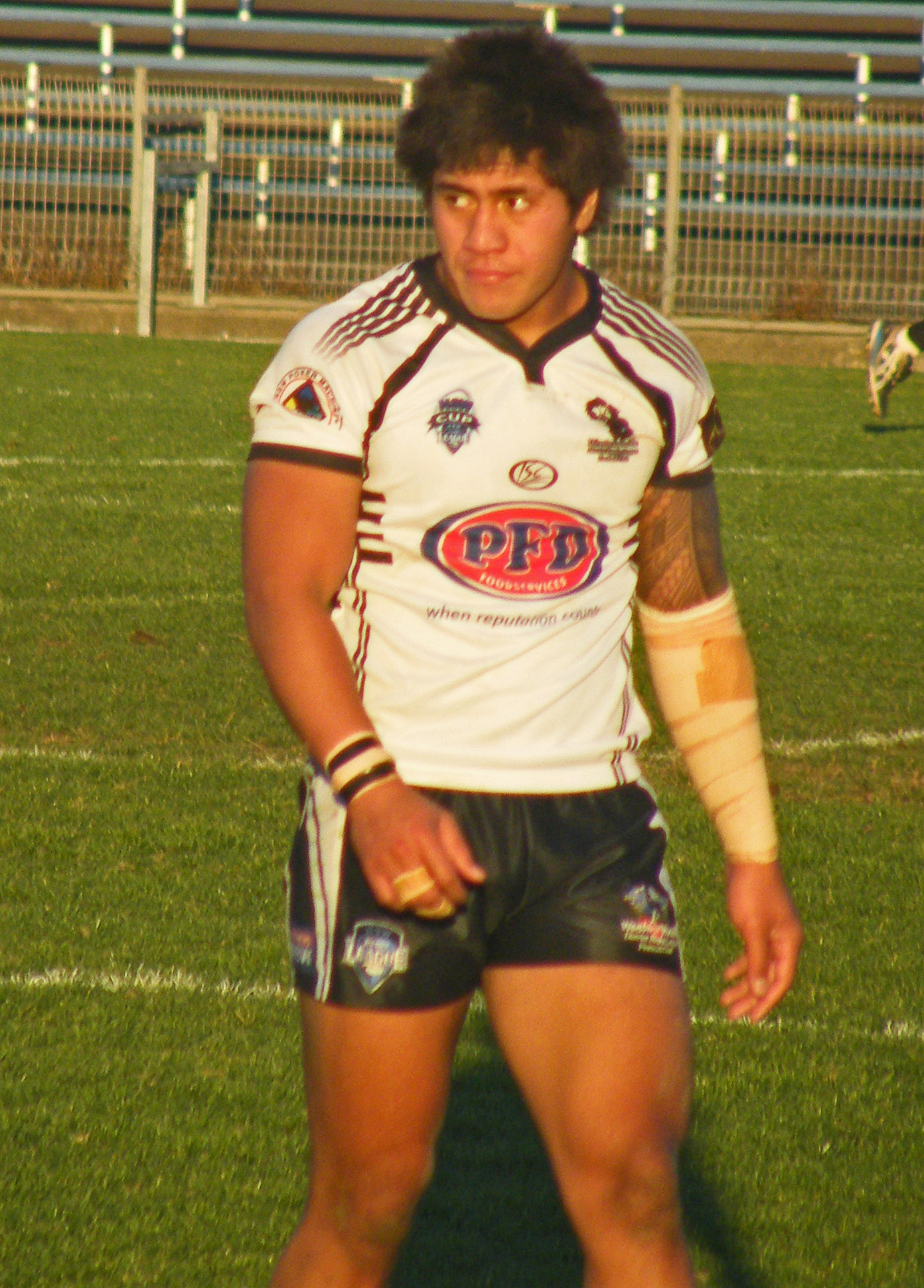
Taufua playing for the Wentworthville Magpies in 2010.

In 2011, Taufua signed with the Manly Warringah Sea Eagles. He played for the Sea Eagles' Toyota Cup team in 2011 before moving on to the Sea Eagles' NSW Cup reserve-grade team in 2012.

=== 2012 ===
In round 4 of the 2012 NRL season, Manly Warringah head coach Geoff Toovey selected Taufua to make his NRL debut from the interchange bench for Manly Warringah against the St George Illawarra Dragons but he didn't get on the field in the club's 6-17 loss at Kogarah Oval.

In round 5 against the Parramatta Eels, Taufua made his official NRL debut for the Manly Warringah Sea Eagles on the wing and scored a try in Manly's 29-20 loss at Parramatta Stadium.

Since being selected on the wing, Taufua established himself as Manly's left winger, replacing long time winger, and 2008 NRL Grand Final hero, Michael Robertson, who had left the club. On 20 June 2012, Taufua re-signed with the club for two years to the end of the 2014 season.

While some considered Taufua unlucky to miss out on the Rookie of the Year award for his impressive debut season, it was towards the end of the season and during the finals series that Taufua's potential became fully evident.

Despite many of his teammates showing the effects of a season crippled by injuries and off-field dramas, Taufua produced a string of astonishing performances, including a man-of-the-match performance in Manly-Warringah's 22-12 semi final win over the North Queensland Cowboys.

Unfortunately for Taufua, and Manly, they saved their worst performance of the season for the Preliminary Final against the Melbourne Storm at AAMI Park just a week after defeating North Queensland 22-12 at SFS.

Manly-Warringah bumbled and fumbled their way through a savage 40-12 loss to the eventual NRL premiers. Taufua finished his debut year in the [NRL with him being named the Manly-Warringah Sea Eagles 2012 NRL season rookie of the year with him playing in 23 matches and scoring 10 tries. On 19 October 2012, Taufua was charged with assault for allegedly spitting at a Queensland Police officer at a night club on the Gold Coast. Taufua was then banned in court from entering any licensed venues in Queensland. As a result, a special court hearing was needed (held on 7 March 2013) to allow him to play for Manly-Warringah in their opening match of the 2013 NRL season against the Brisbane Broncos at Suncorp Stadium, which is a licensed venue. The outcome of the hearing saw a variation to the original ruling. While still banned from entering any licensed venues, Taufua was allowed into such venues for the purposes of his employment as a professional rugby league footballer.

=== 2013 ===
Taufua started 2013 with well by scoring 7 tries in the first 5 matches, including a hat-trick in Manly's 32-0 win over the Newcastle Knights at Brookvale Oval in round 2.

In April 2014, Taufua earned his first representative selection when he played on the wing for NSW City Origin in their 18-12 loss to NSW Country Origin in Coffs Harbour. Taufua's form on the wing for Manly also saw him spoken as a possible selection for New South Wales in the State of Origin series, though he ultimately missed selection.

Taufua played on the wing in Manly's 26-18 Grand Final loss to the Sydney Roosters scoring the first try in the match.

Taufua finished the 2013 NRL season with him played 26 matches and being Manly's joint top tryscorer with David Williams on 20 tries.

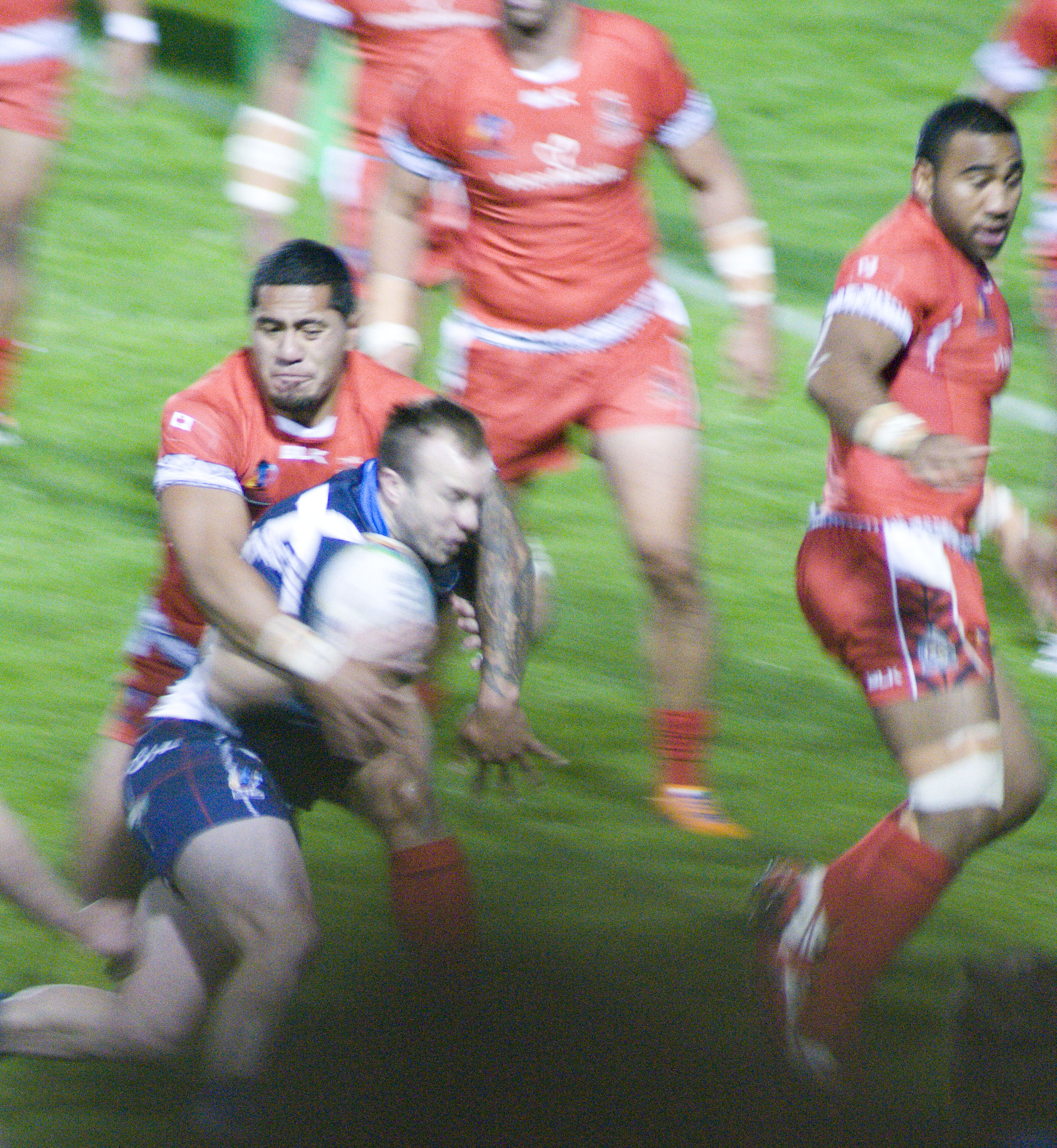
Taufua making a tackle for Tonga against Scotland at the 2013 RLWC

Taufua played for Tonga in the 2013 Rugby League World Cup playing in all 3 matches and scoring a try against the Cook Islands in the 22-16 win at Leigh Sports Village.

=== 2014 ===
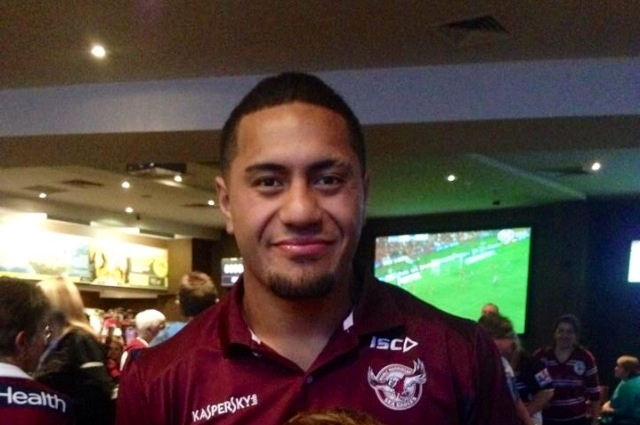
Taufua in 2014

In February 2014, Taufua was selected in the Sea Eagles inaugural 2014 Auckland Nines squad. Taufua was selected to play for City Origin on the wing against Country Origin in the 26-all draw in Dubbo.

A day before Manly's Finals Week 2 match against the Canterbury-Bankstown Bulldogs, Taufua was dropped by coach Geoff Toovey after he was struggling under the high ball in Manly-Warringah's 40-24 loss to South Sydney a week earlier in Week 1 of the 2014 finals series. Taufua finished off the 2014 NRL season with him playing in 16 matches and scoring 10 tries for Manly-Warringah.

=== 2015 ===
On 21 March, Taufua was involved in an alcohol fuelled fight with Canterbury-Bankstown Bulldogs player Jacob Loko outside the Hotel Chambers on Elizabeth Street in the Sydney Central Business District.

Taufua was later hit with a $10,000 fine and an alcohol ban till 31 December.

On 2 May, he played for Tonga in their Polynesian Cup test-match clash against Pacific rivals Samoa, playing on the wing and scoring 2 tries in Tonga's 16-18 loss at Cbus Super Stadium. As he was about to score a third try that would put Tonga in front by two points with 3 minutes left remaining in the match, he was taken into touch from a hit by Samoan forwards Frank Pritchard and Sam Kasiano. He finished off the 2015 season having played in 17 matches and scoring 10 tries for the Sea Eagles. On 17 October, he represented Tonga again, this time in their Asia-Pacific Qualifier match against the Cook Islands for the 2017 Rugby League World Cup, playing on the wing and scoring a try in Tonga's 28-8 win at Campbelltown Stadium.

=== 2016 ===
On 1 February, Taufua was named in Manly's 2016 NRL Auckland Nines squad.

=== 2017 ===
In round 13, Taufua suffered an anterior cruciate ligament tear and was ruled out for the season.

=== 2018 ===
On March 27, Taufua was ruled out for 8 weeks after suffering a broken collarbone. In total, Taufua made 12 appearances for Manly in 2018 as the club finished second last on the table and narrowly avoided the wooden spoon.

=== 2019 ===
Taufua made 24 appearances for Manly in the 2019 NRL season as the club finished sixth on the table and qualified for the finals. Taufua played in both of Manly's finals games including their elimination final loss against South Sydney at ANZ Stadium. Taufua was also responsible for some of the biggest tackles seen in the 2019 season including a tackle which even made the news in the United States of America after Taufua hit Melbourne player Cameron Munster with a hard driving tackle.

=== 2020 ===
In round 17 of the 2020 NRL season, Taufua scored a try but was later taken from the field with a torn calf injury during Manly's 34-32 loss against the Wests Tigers at Brookvale Oval. When asked in the post match press conference about Taufua, Manly head coach Des Hasler said "He's torn a calf so you'd think he won't be back [this year]. Add it to the list".

=== 2021 & 2022 ===
After missing the entire 2021 NRL season through injury, Taufua was called into the Manly side for the first time in almost two years for the clubs round 12 match against Melbourne in the 2022 NRL season. Taufua scored a try in Manly's 28-8 loss.

On 7 July 2022, Taufua was granted an immediate release from his Manly contract to join Super League side Wakefield Trinity until the end of 2023. Taufua made his Wakefield Trinity debut in round 19 of the 2022 Super League season against Hull Kingston Rovers. The following week, he scored his first try for the club in a 13-12 loss against St Helens RFC. On 27 July, it was announced that Taufua would miss the remainder of the season after having surgery for an arm injury.

=== 2023 ===
On 21 June, Taufua signed a contract to join RFL Championship side Bradford for the remainder of the season.

=== 2024 ===
On 31 October, Taufua signed a one year extension with Bradford until the end of the 2025 season.

=== 2025 ===
On 19 December 2025 it was reported that he was playing for 6th-tier rugby union side Bradford Salem RFC after leaving Bradford Bulls

== Statistics ==
Year	Team	Games	Tries	Pts
2012	Manly Warringah Sea Eagles	24	10	40
2013	Manly Warringah Sea Eagles	26	20	80
2014	Manly Warringah Sea Eagles	16	10	40
2015	Manly Warringah Sea Eagles	17	10	40
2016	Manly Warringah Sea Eagles	18	12	48
2017	Manly Warringah Sea Eagles	12	8	32
2018	Manly Warringah Sea Eagles	12	2	8
2019	Manly Warringah Sea Eagles	24	8	32
2020	Manly Warringah Sea Eagles	14	7	28
2022	Manly Warringah Sea Eagles	1	1	4
2022	Wakefield Trinity	2	1	4
2023	Wakefield Trinity	12		
2023	Bradford Bulls	7	4	16
2024	Bradford Bulls	22	9	36
2025	Bradford Bulls	9	5	20
	Totals	194	199	396
