= Curtis Sironen =

Australian rugby league footballer

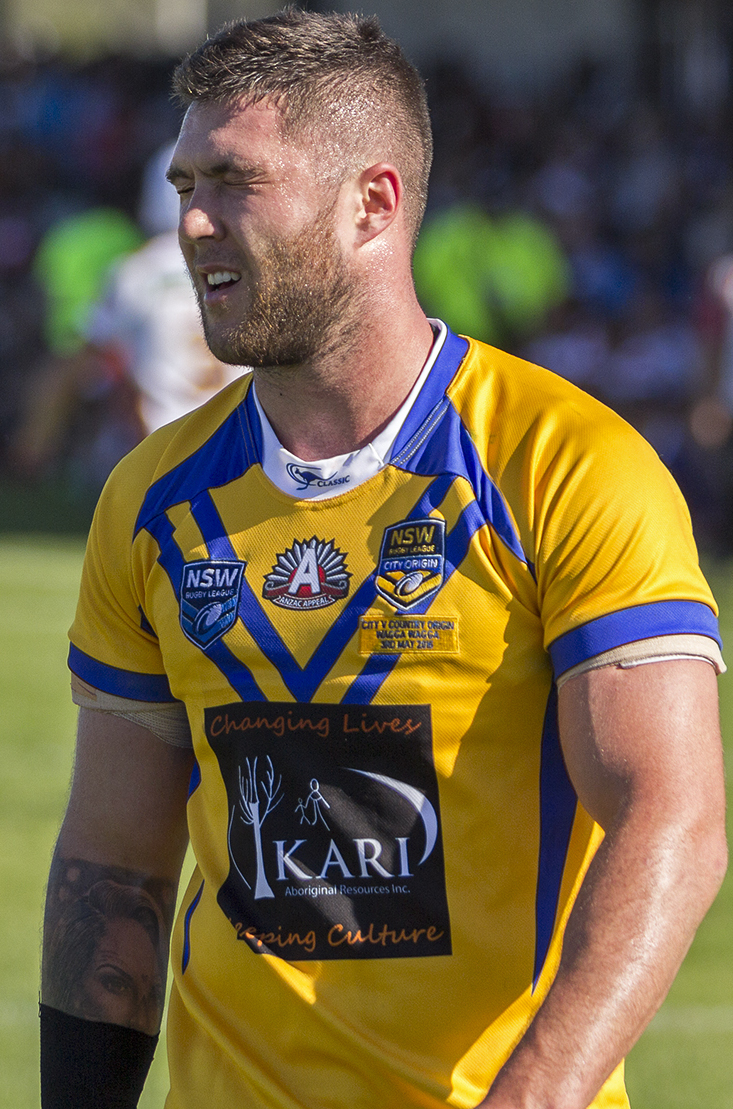

Personal information
- Full name: Curtis James Sironen
- Born: 31 July 1993 (age 33) Sydney, New South Wales, Australia
- Height: 6 ft 4 in (1.93 m)
- Weight: 17 st 5 lb (110 kg)

Playing information
- Position: Second-row, Halfback, Five-eighth
Club
Years	Team	Pld	T	G	FG	P
2012–16	Wests Tigers	65	8	4	0	40
2017–21	Manly Sea Eagles	66	17	0	0	68
2022–	St Helens	103	19	0	0	76
	Total	234	44	4	0	184
Representative
Years	Team	Pld	T	G	FG	P
2013–17	City Origin	4	0	0	0	0
- Source: As of 4 August 2026
- Education: Holy Cross College, Ryde
- Father: Paul Sironen
- Relatives: Bayley Sironen (brother)

Curtis Sironen (born 31 July 1993) is an Australian professional rugby league footballer who plays as a second-row forward for St Helens in the Super League.

He previously played for the Wests Tigers and Manly-Warringah Sea Eagles in the National Rugby League. He has also played at representative level for City Origin.

== Early years ==
Sironen was born in Sydney, New South Wales, Australia and is the son of Balmain Tigers legend Paul Sironen.

Sironen played his junior football with the Dundas Shamrocks. A student at Holy Cross College Ryde, Sironen captained the NSW Combined Catholic Colleges to victory in the Australian Schoolboys tournament in 2011. He represented New South Wales at an under-18 level, and played for the Australian Schoolboys side in 2011, while playing for Wests Tigers NYC team. Undergoing shoulder surgery after completing his HSC, Sironen rejoined the NYC team in round 9.

== Playing career ==
=== 2012 ===
With Robert Lui leaving the club at the end of 2011, Sironen was considered a possible replacement for the Wests Tigers halfback, along with players Jacob Miller, Tim Moltzen and Tom Humble. Moltzen started the season at halfback, but a number of players filled the position before Benji Marshall moved from five-eighth. Sironen was 18 years old when he made his debut from the bench against the North Queensland Cowboys midway through the 2012 NRL season. The next week he made his first appearance in the starting side, playing at five-eighth and scoring a try. Coach Tim Sheens said of him, "I've been trying to hide him as long as I can. There's no doubt he's a first grader." Sironen is the first son of a former Balmain or Wests player to get a run for Wests Tigers.

Having established himself as the team five-eighth outside Benji Marshall, Sironen had played 6 games when he was injured. Coach Tim Sheens said, "Young Curtis will be out for the season and we're pretty sure he'll need another reconstruction. When you throw your arm out like he did and the guy's going in another direction, even with a good shoulder you can suffer a dislocation." Despite playing just 6 games for the year, he was named the club's joint Rookie of the Year.

=== 2013 ===
Returning from injury in round 6 of 2013, Sironen was initially chosen in the halves. After only one game, Sironen was a late selection (after Josh Reynolds withdrew) to play for City in the annual City vs Country Origin match. He was the third least experienced player to ever appear in the match. Later in the season, Braith Anasta was moved to five-eighth and Sironen played in the second-row. In the last 4 games of the year, Sironen scored a try in 3 games.

=== 2014 ===
After an injury-hampered 2014, where he was limited to 13 games, Sironen underwent shoulder surgery in the off-season.

=== 2015 ===
He played in the first 11 rounds of 2015 before undergoing neck surgery. Returning to first grade in July, he made 19 appearances for the season. Mostly playing in the second row, he was on the field for a full 80 minutes in 15 games. On 31 October 2015, Sironen needed to delete his Twitter account in the wake of a media story which arose that involved Sironen's former partner. According to reports, Sironen's ex-partner hacked into his Twitter account and posted a naked photo of him with another woman with the caption "I make excuses this is why my girlfriend who is tattooed on my arm left me". After the story was aired in the media Sironen tried to downplay the incident.

=== 2016 ===
Sironen played the opening two games of the season in the second row, before missing three with injury. Soon after his return, he was chosen in the City side for the third time. Sironen said, "As someone who wants State of Origin honours in the future this is one of the stepping stones. Earlier this season I had a hamstring niggle. I've just been trying to get my body healthy and play for the Tigers, I'm just worrying about that before anything else. If I can put all the drama aside I'll be able to one day achieve the goals I've set myself."

In November 2016, it was reported that Sironen would opt out of his contract so he could join the Manly-Warringah Sea Eagles for 2 seasons starting in 2017. In the wake of Sironen leaving the Wests Tigers, his father Paul slammed coach Jason Taylor in the media as he claimed that Taylor was leaving his son out of the first grade side on purpose. After Taylor was terminated, Paul Sironen said "He punted me then got rid of my young bloke last year, Well, karma's a bitch, Good riddance & don't let the door hit you on the way out!".

=== 2017 ===
On 4 May 2017, Sironen was placed under investigation by The NRL for an incident involving his former partner and the woman he had an affair with at a Balmain pub. It was alleged that Sironen smashed the door of a women's toilet because his former partner was spending far too long in the woman's cubicle with the woman he was cheated with. Witnesses said they had seen Sironen leave bleeding heavily from his hand and he was photographed two days later at training with his hand wrapped in a bandage. In the 2017 season, Sironen suffered a torn pectoral muscle in Round 14 and was ruled out for twelve weeks. He made it back for the last two games of the season – round 26 against the Penrith Panthers and then the elimination final, against the same opponents the following week. At the end of the season Curtis played 15 games for the Manly club scoring six tries.

=== 2018 ===
In the 2018 NRL season, Sironen only managed to feature in 4 games for Manly as he missed the majority of the year with a knee injury which required a reconstruction.

=== 2019 ===
In Round 15 against the Gold Coast, Sironen scored 2 tries as Manly-Warringah won the match 30-12 at Cbus Super Stadium.

Sironen made 22 appearances for Manly in the 2019 NRL season as the club finished 6th on the table and qualified for the finals. Sironen missed out on playing in the club's final series due a foot injury sustained in Manly's round 25 loss against Parramatta.

=== 2020 ===
Sironen played 18 games for Manly-Warringah in the 2020 NRL season as they finished a disappointing 13th on the table.

=== 2021 ===
It was announced in September 2021 that Sironen had signed a two-year deal with the reigning English Super League champions St Helens RLFC for the 2022 season.

=== 2022 ===
In round 1 of the 2022 Super League season, Sironen made his club debut for St Helens R.F.C. where they defeated Catalans Dragons 28-8. On 24 September 2022, Sironen played in St Helens 24-12 Grand Final victory over Leeds.

=== 2023 ===
On 18 February 2023, Sironen played in St Helens 13-12 upset victory over Penrith in the 2023 World Club Challenge. In round 3 of the 2023 Super League season, Sironen was sent to the sin bin during St Helens 25-24 controversial loss against Leeds. Sironen played 15 games for St Helens in the 2023 Super League season as the club finished third on the table. Sironen played in St Helens narrow loss against the Catalans Dragons in the semi-final which stopped them reaching a fifth successive grand final.

=== 2024 ===
Sironen played 21 matches for St Helens in the 2024 Super League season which saw the club finish sixth on the table.

=== 2025 ===
Sironen played 24 games for St Helens in the 2025 Super League season including the clubs 20-12 semi-final loss against Hull Kingston Rovers.

=== 2026 ===
Sironen was limited to just 12 games with St Helens in the 2026 Super League season as the club missed the playoffs finishing 7th on the table.

== Statistics ==
Year	Teams	Games	Tries	Goals	Pts
2012	Wests Tigers	6	1		4
2013	Wests Tigers	19	3	3	18
2014	Wests Tigers	13	2	1	10
2015	Wests Tigers	19	1		4
2016	Wests Tigers	8	1		4
2017	Manly Warringah Sea Eagles	16	6		24
2018	Manly Warringah Sea Eagles	4	2		8
2019	Manly Warringah Sea Eagles	22	5		20
2020	Manly Warringah Sea Eagles	18	3		12
2021	Manly Warringah Sea Eagles	6	1		4
2022	St Helens	24	3		12
2023	St Helens	17	4		16
2024	St Helens	23	3		12
2025	St Helens	26	5		20
2026	St Helens	4	1		4
	Totals	220	40	4	176
