= Houldsworth baronets of Heckmondwike (1956) =

The Houldsworth baronetcy, of Heckmondwike in the West Riding of the County of York, was created in the Baronetage of the United Kingdom on 25 January 1956 for the coal industry manager and industrialist Hubert Houldsworth. He died a week later. The title became extinct on the death of his son, the 2nd Baronet, in 1990.

== Houldsworth baronets, of Heckmondwike (1956) ==
- Sir Hubert Stanley Houldsworth, 1st Baronet (1889–1956)
- Sir (Harold) Basil Houldsworth, 2nd Baronet (1922–1990), died leaving a daughter.
