= Tom Burgess (rugby league) =

Great Britain and England international rugby league footballer

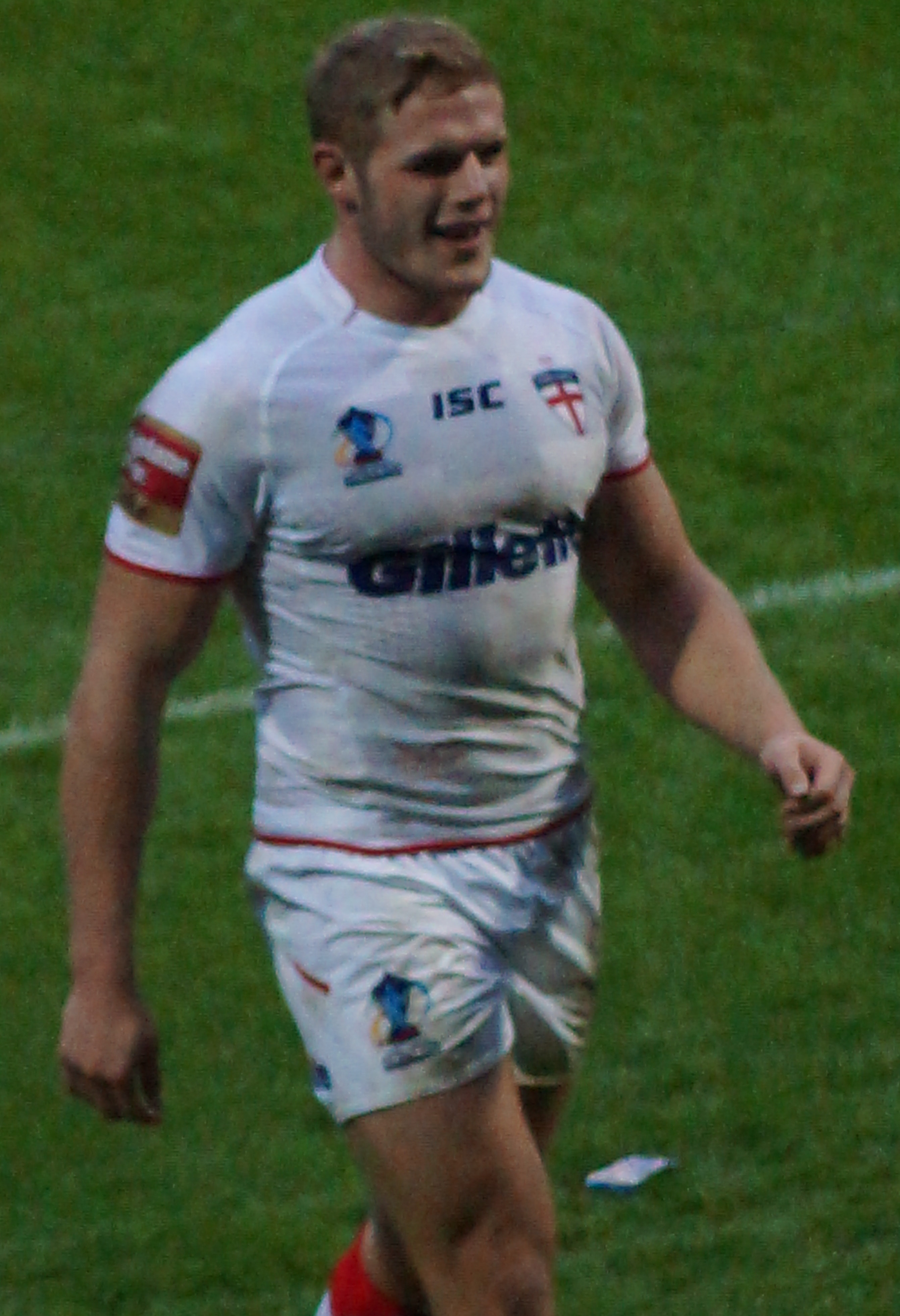

Personal information
- Full name: Thomas Burgess
- Born: 21 April 1992 (age 34) Dewsbury, West Yorkshire, England
- Height: 6 ft 5 in (1.96 m)
- Weight: 18 st 13 lb (120 kg)

Playing information
- Position: Prop
Club
Years	Team	Pld	T	G	FG	P
2011–12	Bradford Bulls	46	4	0	0	16
2013–24	South Sydney	249	22	1	0	90
2025–	Huddersfield Giants	36	3	0	0	12
	Total	331	29	1	0	118
Representative
Years	Team	Pld	T	G	FG	P
2012	England Knights	2	2	0	0	8
2013–22	England	34	8	0	0	32
2016	World All Stars	1	0	0	0	0
2019	Great Britain	4	0	0	0	0
- Source: As of 31 March 2026
- Relatives: George Burgess (brother); Luke Burgess (brother); Sam Burgess (brother)

Thomas Burgess (born 21 April 1992) is an English professional rugby league footballer who plays as a prop for the Huddersfield Giants in the English Super League. He has played for the England Knights, England and Great Britain at international level.

Burgess previously played for the Bradford Bulls in the Super League and the South Sydney Rabbitohs in the NRL, and has played for the World All Stars. He played in the Rabbitohs 2014 NRL Grand Final winning team alongside his twin brother George Burgess, and older brother Sam Burgess. Burgess is also the younger brother of retired rugby league footballer Luke Burgess.

== Background ==
Burgess was born on 21 April 1992 in Dewsbury, West Yorkshire, England. His father, Mark Burgess who died of Motor neurone disease, was also a rugby league footballer who played for Nottingham City, Rochdale Hornets, Dewsbury Rams and Hunslet; while his mother Julie is a teacher, currently employed at The Scots College in Bellevue Hill, Sydney. Burgess is brother of Luke, and fellow South Sydney Rabbitohs players Sam, and twin-brother George. Burgess attended Castle Hall Academy to receive a secondary education before becoming a professional rugby league footballer. He played his junior rugby league for Dewsbury Moor.

Burgess was a product of the Leeds Rhinos junior development system, before moving onto the Bradford Bulls.

== Playing career ==
=== 2011 ===
Burgess first featured in three of the four pre-season friendlies of the 2011 season, playing against Halifax, the Dewsbury Rams and the Wakefield Trinity Wildcats. He made his Super League début in Round 8 against the London Broncos off the interchange bench in the Bradford Bulls' 24-22 win. In Round 20 against the Catalans Dragons, Burgess scored his first Super League try in the Bradford Bulls' 34-28 loss. Burgess also played in both Challenge Cup games against Halifax and Wigan Warriors, scoring against Halifax. He played in 20 matches and scored 2 tries in 2011.

=== 2012 ===
On 6 August, it was announced that Burgess had signed a one-year deal with the South Sydney Rabbitohs for 2013, joining brothers Sam, Luke and George. Burgess scored one try from 25 matches for the season. He was selected in the England Knights squad for the 2012 European Cup. Burgess made his Knights début in the 56–4 win over Ireland scoring a try in the process. In this competition he also featured in the 62–24 win over Scotland.

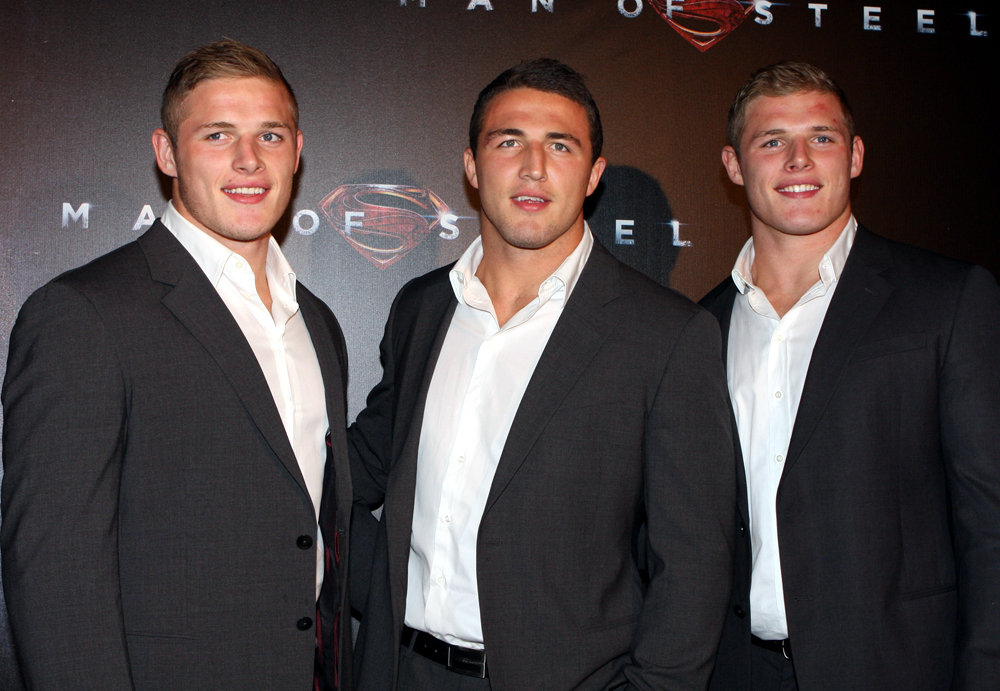
Tom Burgess with older brother Sam, and twin brother George in 2013.

=== 2013 ===
In Round 15, Burgess made his NRL début for South Sydney against the Parramatta Eels, playing off the interchange bench in the 30-10 win at ANZ Stadium. In August, against the Wests Tigers, the Burgess Brothers became the first set of four brothers to line up in the same Australian side since Ray, Roy, Rex and Bernard Norman played for Sydney's Annandale club in the 1910 NSWRFL season. South Sydney won 32-18 at SFS. Burgess finished his début year in the NRL with 9 appearances. He joined England's 24-man squad for the World Cup, and played in 2 matches.

=== 2014 ===
Burgess returned to first grade in Round 11. In Round 21 against the Newcastle Knights at Barlow Park in Cairns, Burgess scored his first NRL try in South Sydney's smashing 50-10 win. On 5 October, in South Sydney's 2014 NRL Grand Final against the Canterbury-Bankstown Bulldogs, Burgess played off the interchange bench in the club's 30-6 victory alongside his brothers George and Sam Burgess. Burgess finished the season with one try from 17 matches . Burgess was selected in the English final 24-man squad for the Four Nations series, and played in all 3 matches of the tournament.

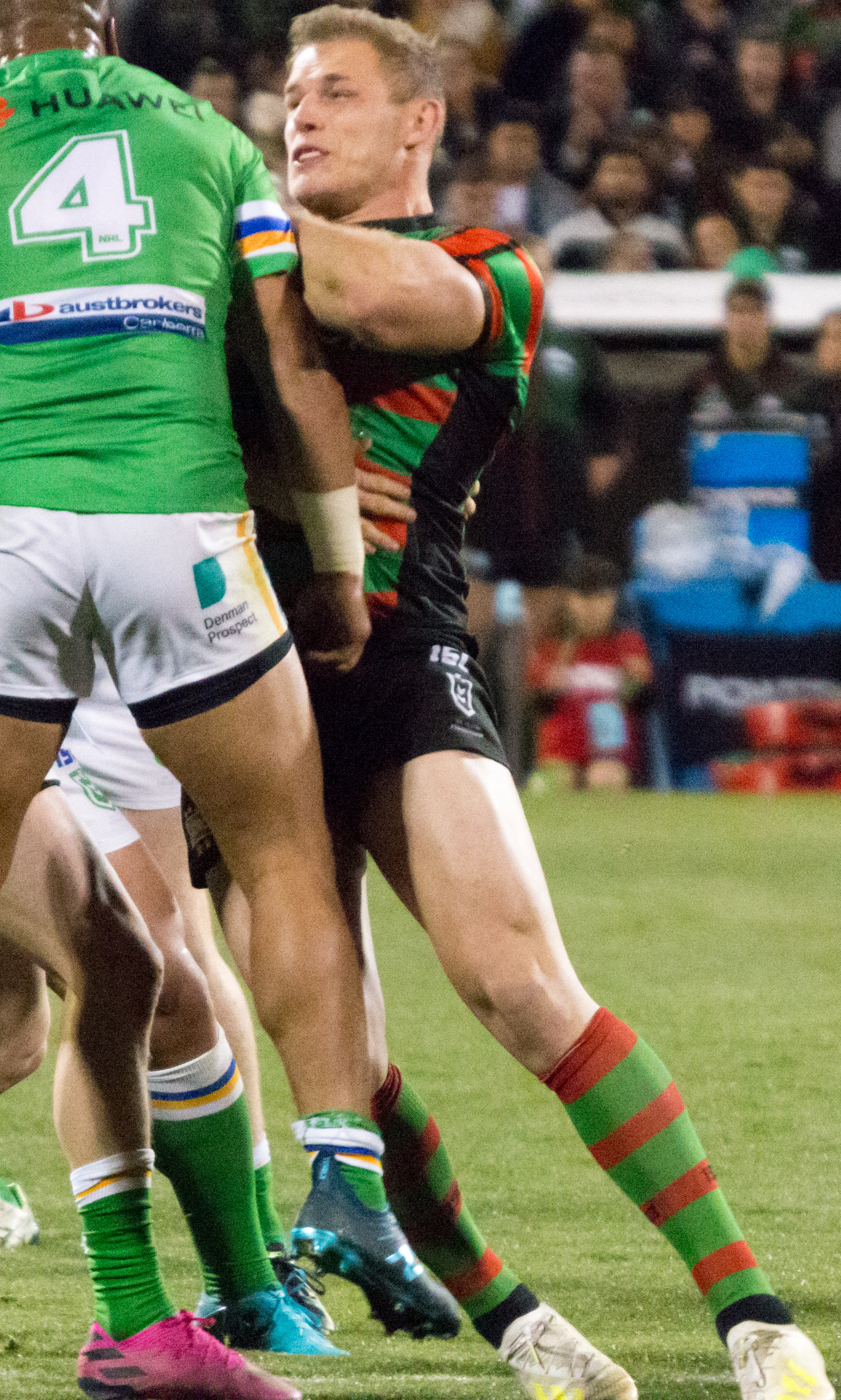
Tom Burgess playing for the Rabbitohs in 2019

=== 2015 ===
On 23 February, Burgess played for South Sydney in the 2015 World Club Challenge match against 2014 Super League Grand Final premiers St. Helens, playing off the interchange bench in the 39-0 win at Langtree Park. Burgess extended his contract with the Rabbitohs to the end of the 2017 season after scoring 2 tries from his 24 appearances. Burgess scored his first international try in England's 84-4 shellacking win over France at Leigh. He then played in the end of year test series against New Zealand, appearing in all 3 matches off the interchange bench in England's 2-1 Baskerville Shield series win. In December, Burgess trialled and trained with NFL teams the Seattle Seahawks and Buffalo Bills after he attracted interest from the clubs.

=== 2016 ===
In February 2016, Burgess played in South Sydney's Auckland Nines squad, On 13 February 2016, Burgess played for the World All Stars against the Indigenous All Stars in the 2016 All Stars match, starting at prop in the 12-8 win at Suncorp Stadium. After missing the first 4 rounds due to injury, in Round 5 against the Manly-Warringah Sea Eagles, Burgess made his return to the South Sydney team, playing off the interchange bench in the 16-12 win at Brookvale Oval. In July 2016, it was rumoured that Burgess was being offloaded to other clubs in a clean-out overhaul in their underperforming roster.

Burgess finished the 2016 NRL season with him playing in 19 matches for South Sydney. At the end of the season, Tom was selected in England's 24-man squad for the 2016 Four Nations. Before the tournament began, England played a test match against France in which Burgess scored his second international try in England's 40-6 win. Burgess played in all 3 matches off the interchange bench of the tournament.

=== 2017 ===
On 6 May 2017, Burgess played for England in the test against Samoa, playing off the interchange bench in the 30-10 win at Campbelltown Stadium.

Burgess finished the 2017 NRL season with him playing in 22 matches for the South Sydney club.

In October 2017 he was selected in the England squad for the 2017 Rugby League World Cup. Burgess played in The World Cup final against Australia and made two crucial errors towards the end of the game in which Australia came out victorious 6-0.

On 6 December 2017, Burgess signed an extension contract with Souths keeping him at the club until the end of 2019.

=== 2018 ===
Burgess scored his first try in two years against the New Zealand Warriors in round 11 in South Sydney's 30-10 victory at Mount Smart Stadium. The following week he scored a double against the Cronulla-Sutherland Sharks at ANZ Stadium in South Sydney's 22-14 win. Burgess made 27 appearances for Souths in total as the club finished 3rd on the table at the end of the regular season and reached the preliminary final before being defeated by eventual premiers the Sydney Roosters 12-4.

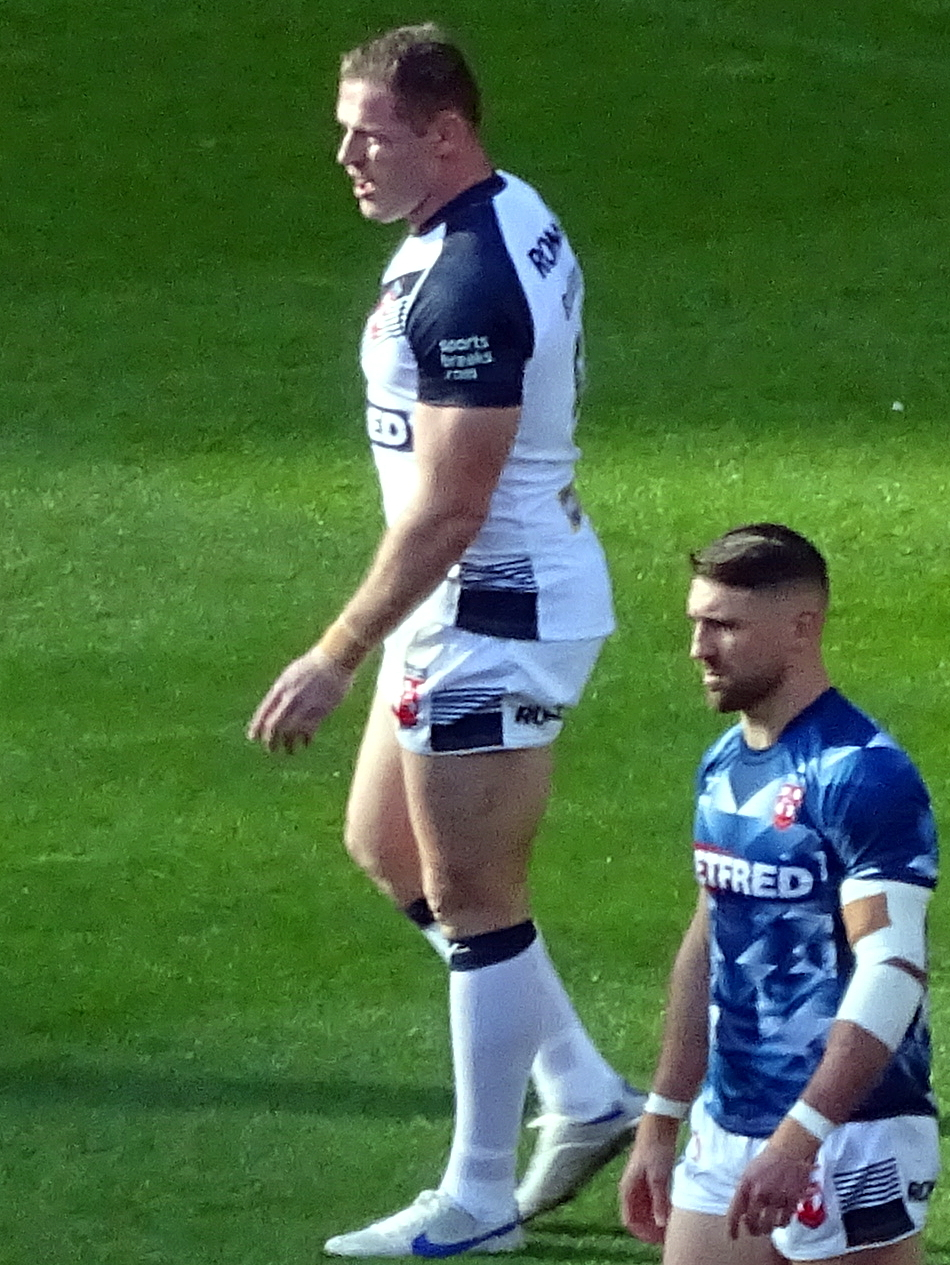
Burgess warming up for England in 2022

In 2018 he was selected for England against France at the Leigh Sports Village.

=== 2019 ===
Burgess began the 2019 NRL season in good form as the club won 10 of their first 11 games to sit on top of the table. Following South Sydney's Round 13 loss against Newcastle Knights, Burgess was ruled out of action for 4–6 weeks with an ankle injury. Burgess returned to the Souths side in Round 19 which South Sydney won 20-16 after the final siren had sounded.

Burgess made a total of 19 appearances for South Sydney in the 2019 NRL season as the club finished 3rd on the table and qualified for the finals. Burgess featured in all 3 of the club's finals games as they reached the preliminary final against Canberra Raiders, but were defeated 16-10 at Canberra Stadium.

On 10 October, Burgess was named in the England team for the 2019 Rugby League World Cup 9s.

He was selected in squad for the 2019 Great Britain Lions tour of the Southern Hemisphere. He made his Great Britain test debut in the defeat by Tonga.

=== 2020 ===
Burgess played 23 games for Souths throughout the year as the club reached their third straight preliminary final. However, for the third straight year Souths would fall short of a grand final appearance losing to Penrith 20-16 at ANZ Stadium.

=== 2021 ===
In round 6 of the 2021 NRL season, he scored the winning try for South Sydney in their 18-14 golden point extra-time victory over the Wests Tigers.

In round 19, he scored two tries for Souths in their 60-22 victory over the New Zealand Warriors.

Burgess played a total of 26 games for South Sydney in the 2021 NRL season including the club's 2021 NRL Grand Final defeat against Penrith.

=== 2022 ===
In round 20 of the 2022 NRL season, Burgess was sent off for a dangerous high tackle in South Sydney's 21-20 loss against Cronulla.

In the first week of the finals, Burgess was sent to the sin bin for a dangerous high tackle in South Sydney's 30-14 upset victory over arch-rivals the Sydney Roosters.

On 13 September, Burgess was suspended for two matches over his high tackle on James Tedesco.

In October he was named in the England squad for the 2021 Rugby League World Cup. In the third group stage match at the 2021 Rugby League World Cup, Burgess scored two tries for England in a 94-4 victory over Greece.

In November he was named in the 2021 RLWC Team of the Tournament.

=== 2023 ===
In round 23 of the 2023 NRL season, Burgess was placed on report during South Sydney's 26-16 loss against Cronulla. On 6 August, Burgess was controversially suspended for three matches with many critics saying the length of the suspension too harsh. Burgess played a total of 16 games throughout the year as South Sydney finished 9th on the table and missed the finals.

=== 2024 ===
On 7 February, it was announced that Burgess had signed a three-year deal with English side Huddersfield which is due to start in the 2025 Super League season. In round 8 of the 2024 NRL season, Burgess became South Sydney's second most capped player in their history. South Sydney would go on to lose 54–20 against Melbourne. In his final game for South Sydney in round 27, Burgess scored a try and kicked a goal in the club's 36–28 loss against arch-rivals the Sydney Roosters.

=== 2025 ===
In round 1 of the 2025 Super League season, Burgess made his club debut for Huddersfield in their 20-12 loss against Warrington. Burgess played 22 matches for Huddersfield in the 2025 Super League season as the club finished 10th on the table.

== Statistics ==
Year	Team	Games	Tries	Goals	Pts
2011	Bradford Bulls	20	2		8
2012	Bradford Bulls	25	2		8
2013	South Sydney Rabbitohs	9			
2014	South Sydney Rabbitohs	17	1		4
2015	South Sydney Rabbitohs	25	2		8
2016	South Sydney Rabbitohs	19			
2017	South Sydney Rabbitohs	22			
2018	South Sydney Rabbitohs	27	5		20
2019	South Sydney Rabbitohs	20	1		4
2020	South Sydney Rabbitohs	23	2		8
2021	South Sydney Rabbitohs	26	4		16
2022	South Sydney Rabbitohs	21	2		8
2023	South Sydney Rabbitohs	16	1		4
2024	South Sydney Rabbitohs	24	4	1	18
2025	Huddersfield Giants	18	1	0	4
2026	Huddersfield Giants				
	Totals	312	27	1	110
