= Luke Keary =

Australia & Ireland international rugby league footballer

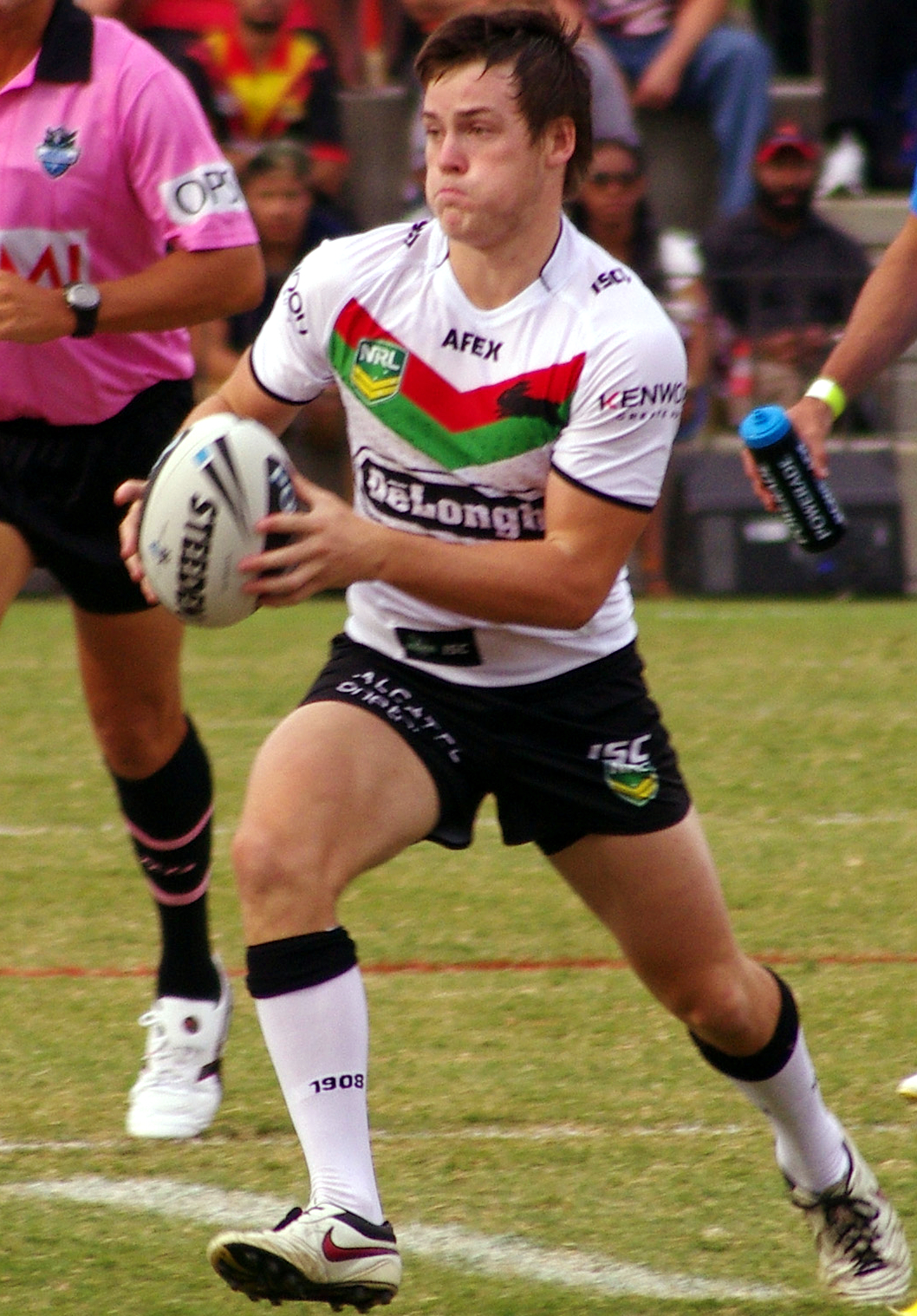

Personal information
- Born: 3 February 1992 (age 34) Ipswich, Queensland, Australia
- Height: 179 cm (5 ft 10 in)
- Weight: 85 kg (13 st 5 lb)

Playing information
- Position: Five-eighth, Halfback
Club
Years	Team	Pld	T	G	FG	P
2013–16	South Sydney	63	12	0	0	48
2017–24	Sydney Roosters	168	36	6	6	162
2025	Catalans Dragons	27	6	0	2	26
	Total	258	54	6	8	236
Representative
Years	Team	Pld	T	G	FG	P
2018	Australia	2	0	0	0	0
2020	New South Wales	1	0	0	0	0
2022	Ireland	3	0	0	0	0
- Source: As of 23 September 2025

Luke Keary (born 3 February 1992) is a former professional rugby league footballer who last played as a Five-eighth or Halfback for the Catalans Dragons in the Super League and Ireland at international level.

Keary previously played for the South Sydney Rabbitohs, with whom he won the 2014 NRL Premiership, and the Sydney Roosters where he won the 2018 and 2019 NRL Premierships and was a fill-in captain. Keary won the Clive Churchill Medal in 2018 with the Roosters.

== Early career ==
Keary was born in Ipswich, Queensland, Australia, and is of Irish descent and was raised in the suburb of Raceview and attended St. Mary's Primary School in Ipswich.

He played junior rugby league for Ipswich Brothers. At age 10, Keary moved to Sydney with his family. In Sydney, Keary played junior rugby league for the Kellyville Bushrangers and later Hills District Bulls and attended Oakhill College in Castle Hill. In 2010, Keary represented the Australian Schoolboys rugby union team. That same year he represented the New South Wales Combined Independent Schools (NSWCIS) rugby league team at the Under 18s National Championships. In 2011, Keary returned to Queensland, moving to the Gold Coast where he attended Griffith University and played a season with the Burleigh Bears, playing for their FOGS Colts and Queensland Cup teams. At the end of the year he won Burleigh's FOGS Colts Best Back Award.

Growing up, Keary supported the Brisbane Broncos, idolising Allan Langer who also hails from Ipswich, and stated his ambitions of one day representing them before signing with the South Sydney Rabbitohs ahead of the 2012 NRL season. Keary played for the Rabbitohs' NYC team in 2012, captaining the team and playing 24 games, in which he scored 20 tries. At the end of season, he was named on the bench in the 2012 NYC Team of the Year and won South Sydney's NYC Best and Fairest award.

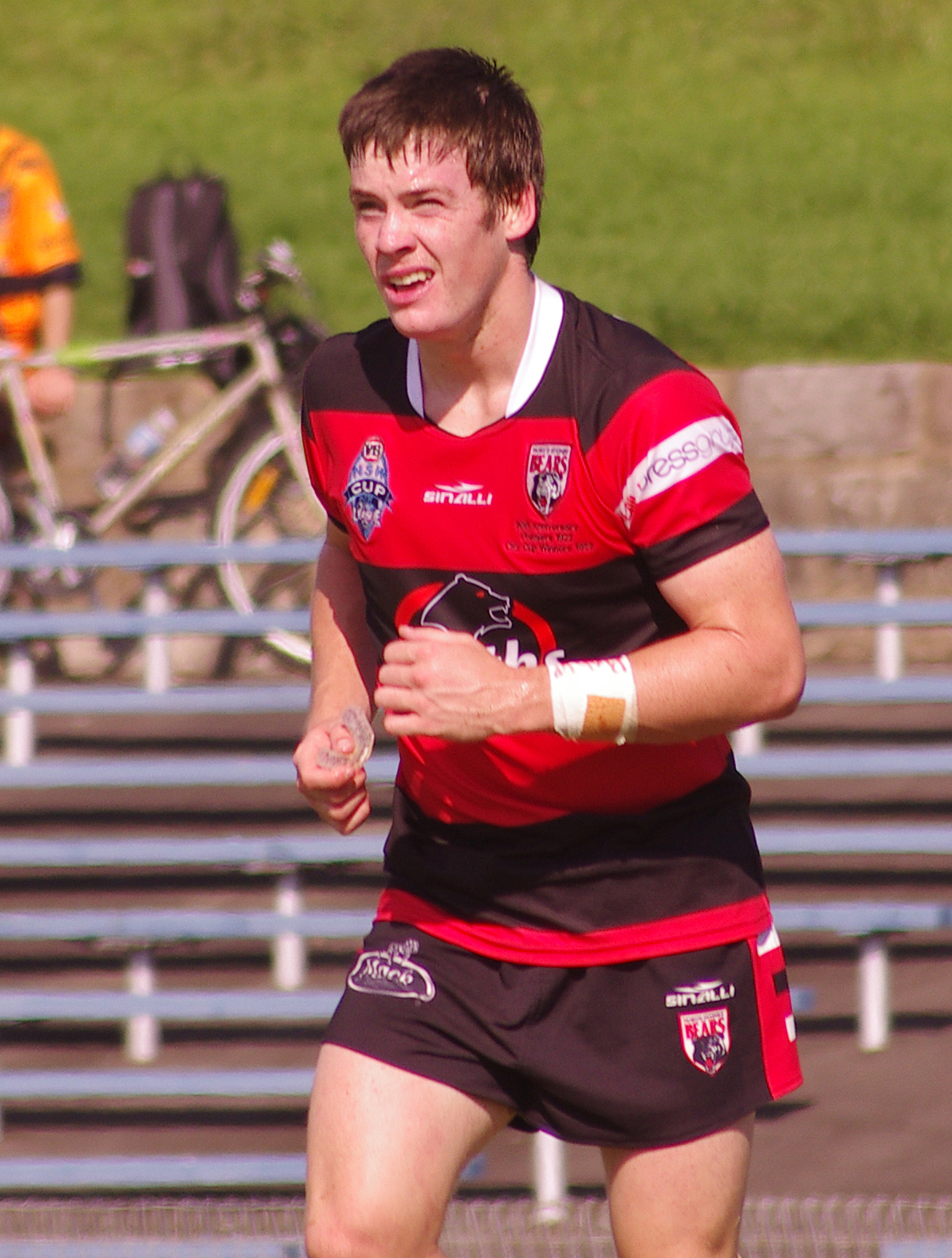
Keary playing for the North Sydney Bears in 2012

== Playing career ==
=== 2013 ===
In January 2013, Keary was a member of the Queensland Junior Emerging Origin squad. In Round 12 of the 2013 NRL season, Keary made his NRL debut for the South Sydney Rabbitohs against the Newcastle Knights off the interchange bench in the clubs 25–18 win at ANZ Stadium. In Round 20 against the Gold Coast Titans, Keary scored his first and second tries NRL career tries off the interchange bench in South Sydney's 32–4 win at Cbus Super Stadium. On 22 August 2013, Keary extended his contract with the South Sydney Rabbitohs to the end of the 2015 season. Keary finished his debut year with two tries in 10 matches.

=== 2014 ===
In February, Keary was selected for the Rabbitohs inaugural 2014 Auckland Nines squad. Keary was preparing his breakout year but it was ruined early due to a torn pectoral muscle injury in the Nines. Keary made his return to the South Sydney team in Round 17 against the Gold Coast Titans, scoring a try in the clubs 14-10 shock loss. On 5 October, in the 2014 NRL Grand Final against Canterbury, Keary played at five-eighth in the 30–6 victory. Keary finished the season with 3 tries from 12 matches.

=== 2015 ===
On 27 January, Keary re-signed with the South Sydney club on a one-year contract. On 23 February, he played for the Rabbitohs in the 2015 World Club Challenge match against 2014 Super League Grand Final premiers St. Helens, playing at five-eighth and scoring a try in the Rabbitohs' 39–0 win at Langtree Park. In April, he was selected for the New South Wales City team for the annual City vs Country Origin match, but withdrew due to a foot injury. He finished off the 2015 season having played in 24 matches and scoring 4 tries for South Sydney.

=== 2016 ===
In January, Keary was involved in a confrontation with actor and Rabbitohs club co-owner Russell Crowe in a pre-season bonding session at Crowe's farm in Nana Glen, New South Wales. It was revealed that Keary was furious after Crowe berated him, Cameron McInnes and some of the younger players. When Keary defended them, Crowe told him that he was not worth the money of his contract, sending Keary into a rage, first at Crowe and then at senior Souths player Sam Burgess for not sticking up for the younger players. Keary was ordered by Crowe to leave the property, which he did, catching a taxi at about 3:00am.

At the start of the year, Keary, who was off contract at season's end, was linked to sign with the Sydney Roosters, the St. George Illawarra Dragons who offered him a contract worth $1.2 million over three-years, or even a shift to Rugby Union for 2017. On 21 June, Keary announced that he signed a 2-year contract with the Roosters starting in 2017. In Round 21 against the Canberra Raiders, Keary would play his last match for the South Sydney Rabbitohs after he suffered a season ending hamstring injury in the woeful 54–4 loss at ANZ Stadium. Keary finished his last season with the South Sydney club playing in 17 matches and scoring three tries in the 2016 NRL season.

=== 2017 ===
In Round 1 of the 2017 NRL season, Keary made his club debut for Sydney Roosters against the Gold Coast Titans, having a successful match by scoring 2 tries in the 32–18 win at Cbus Super Stadium. Keary made 26 appearances for Sydney Roosters and was part of the side which made it all the way to the preliminary final before suffering a shock 16–29 defeat by a depleted North Queensland Cowboys team.

At season's end, Keary contemplated playing in the World Cup. He later said, "I stuck my hand up to play for Ireland in 2017. It didn’t eventuate, I had a few [injuries] at the back end of the year. I’ve always had a connection there since I was a kid. Dad’s family is still over there. I haven’t been over there but you just feel proud whenever he talked about it. It makes me feel good thinking about it."

=== 2018 ===
In 2018, Keary suffered a broken jaw at pre season training and missed over a month of training and trial games.

Keary received the Clive Churchill medal in the 2018 Grand Final where his team the Sydney Roosters beat the Melbourne Storm 21–6.

He capped a stellar season by earning selection in the Australian Kangaroos team as starting five-eighth for Test matches against New Zealand and Tonga.

=== 2019 ===
Keary started the 2019 NRL season in good form as the club won 7 of their first 9 games. Keary's good form meant that he was in line to be selected for New South Wales in the 2019 State of Origin series. In Round 11 against Newcastle, Keary was taken from the field with concussion and was subsequently ruled out for 6 weeks.

On 15 August, Keary was spoken about by Brisbane coach Anthony Seibold comparing him to Darius Boyd saying "I had a look through the competition last weekend, there is an Australian No.6 (Keary) playing for a team in Sydney who only made four metres last week and missed five tackles, Not one thing was said in the media about that. His team won and our team won. For whatever reason because Darius only had one run, he has been crucified all week from what I understand. I just think everyone needs to back off on Darius". Keary spoke to the media in response saying "I don’t really care to be honest. It’s a little bit odd. I don’t know him, I’ve never spoke to him. I don’t care what he says. I don’t care what he thinks".

Keary played at five-eighth for the Sydney Roosters in the 2019 NRL Grand Final in which the club won their second consecutive premiership defeating Canberra 14–8 in the decider. It was Keary's third premiership victory as a player.

On 7 October, Keary was named for the Australian side for the upcoming Oceania Cup fixtures.

=== 2020 ===
In round 9 of the 2020 NRL season, Keary scored two tries as the Sydney Roosters defeated North Queensland 42–16 at Queensland Country Bank Stadium. In August 2020, Keary extended his contract with the Sydney Roosters until the end of the 2024 season. In round 18 against Newcastle, he scored two tries as the Sydney Roosters won the match 42–12 at the Sydney Cricket Ground.

The following week, he scored a further two tries in the club's 34–18 victory over Cronulla-Sutherland.

=== 2021 ===
Following the Roosters decision to release halfback Kyle Flanagan, Keary was moved to halfback by the Roosters.

In round 3 of the 2021 NRL season, Keary suffered a season ending ACL injury in the Sydney Roosters 26–16 loss against archrivals South Sydney.

=== 2022 ===
In Round 1, Keary returned from his ACL injury, in a 6-20 loss to the Newcastle Knights at the Sydney Cricket Ground.

In Round 14, Keary suffered a concussion v the Melbourne Storm, leaving the field 30 minutes into the match and not returning.

In Round 19, Keary returned from his concussion, and moved back to five-eighth with Sam Walker taking over at halfback. Keary scored his first try in almost 2 years in a 42-12 victory over the Knights at McDonald Jones Stadium Keary made 22 appearances for the Sydney Roosters in the 2022 NRL season as the club finished sixth on the table. Keary played in the Sydney Roosters elimination final loss to arch-rivals South Sydney.

=== 2023 ===
In round 5 of the 2023 NRL season, Keary scored two tries for the Sydney Roosters in their 28–20 victory over Parramatta. In round 8, Keary kicked the winning field goal in the Sydney Roosters 27–26 victory over St. George Illawarra in the ANZAC Day game. In round 12, Keary scored two tries for the Sydney Roosters in their 24-22 loss against St. George Illawarra at Kogarah Oval. Keary played 26 matches for the Sydney Roosters in the 2023 NRL season as the club finished 7th on the table and qualified for the finals. Keary played in both of the clubs finals games as they were eliminated in the second week against Melbourne.

=== 2024 ===
On 29 April, it was announced that Keary was expected to announce his decision to retire from the NRL at the end of the 2024 season, later in the afternoon Keary announced his official retirement from the game after 12 seasons in the top grade. On 17 June, Keary announced he had changed his mind about retirement signing a deal to join the Catalans Dragons in the Super League starting in 2025. Keary played a total of 26 games for the Sydney Roosters in the 2024 NRL season as they finished third and qualified for the finals. Keary played in the clubs preliminary final loss against Melbourne.

=== 2025 ===
In round 1 of the 2025 Super League season, Keary made his club debut for Catalans in their upset loss against Hull F.C. On 2 May, Keary came under fire for comments he made about the Super League competition. In an interview with Wide World of Sports, Keary said "If [the NRL] don't buy it, they're in a lot of trouble. All the players are open to it," said Keary, who switched to play from Australia to Ireland in 2022. "[The Super League] is in such a bad way, the game is horrendous over here. It's the product, the coverage, the news around the game, there is zero. You watch the games, they're near unwatchable. The coverage and everything, and because we're in French, they don't show the games. One thing I've appreciated over here, seeing the state of the Super League [is] how good of a place [the NRL] is in. They're literally on their knees begging for the NRL [to buy in]. The players all want it". Rugby League Commercial managing director Rhodri Jones later came out saying that Keary's comments were "over-dramatic". Keary played 27 matches for Catalans in the 2025 Super League season as the club missed the playoffs.

== Representative career ==
Keary's State of Origin eligibility was a point of discussion within the media due to his being born and raised, for the first 10 years of his life, in Ipswich, Queensland. He spent the following eight years in Sydney, before returning to Queensland for another two years. In 2014, Keary wrote to then NRL CEO Dave Smith requesting that he be considered a Queenslander for future representative opportunities. The request was denied and the 2012 eligibility rules were upheld.

Keary made his international debut for Australia in 2018 against New Zealand. In 2020, he was selected to make his State of Origin debut for New South Wales in Game 1.

Following New South Wales upset loss in Game 1 of the 2020 State of Origin series against Queensland, Keary was cut from the New South Wales squad for Game 2 and was not selected for Game 3 as the Blues suffered a shock 2–1 series defeat, with his "successor" at South Sydney, Cody Walker playing Games 2 & 3 in the 6 jersey. On 16 October 2022, Keary made his debut for Ireland at the 2021 Rugby League World Cup and earned man of the match honours in their 48–2 victory over Jamaica.

== Statistics ==
=== NRL ===
†	Denotes seasons in which Keary won an NRL Premiership

Season	Team	Matches	T	G	GK %	F/G	Pts	W	L	D	W-L %
2013	South Sydney Rabbitohs	10	2	0	—	0	8	7	3	0	70.00
2014†	South Sydney Rabbitohs	12	3	0	—	0	12	9	3	0	75.00
2015	South Sydney Rabbitohs	24	4	0	—	0	16	13	11	0	54.17
2016	South Sydney Rabbitohs	17	3	0	—	0	12	4	13	0	23.53
2017	Sydney Roosters	26	8	0	—	1	33	18	8	0	69.23
2018†	Sydney Roosters	23	5	0	—	1	21	17	6	0	73.91
2019†	Sydney Roosters	22	2	0	—		36	17	7	0	
2020	Sydney Roosters	20	10				42				
2021	Sydney Roosters	3				2					
2022	Sydney Roosters	22	2				8				
2023	Sydney Roosters	26	5	3		2	8				
2024	Sydney Roosters	26	4	3			22				
2025	Catalans Dragons	27	6	0		2	26	0	0	0	0%
Career totals		231	48	6	—	6	210	84	51	0	60.97
