= George Burgess (rugby league) =

English rugby footballer

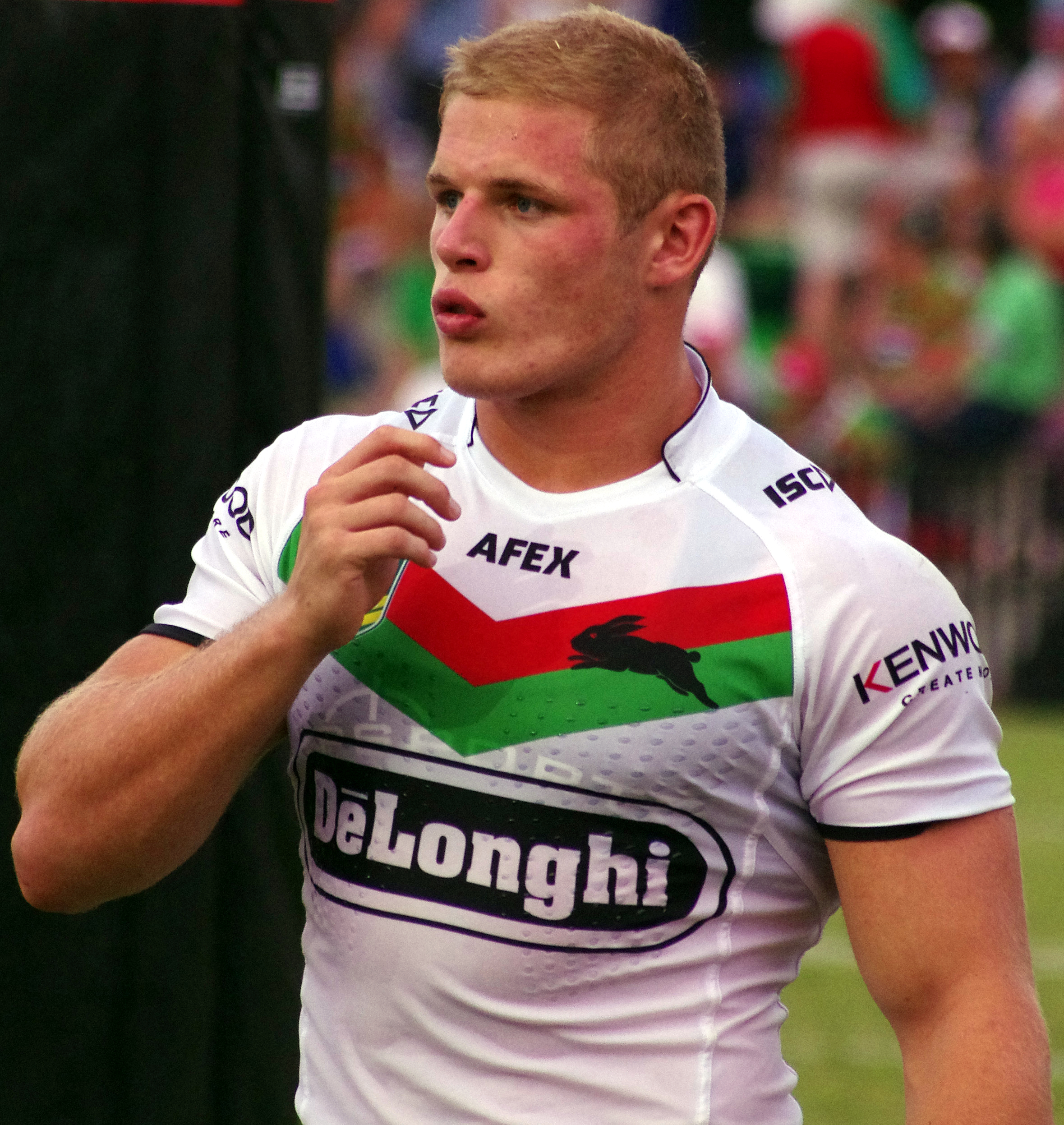

Personal information
- Born: 21 April 1992 (age 34) Dewsbury, West Yorkshire, England

Playing information
- Height: 195 cm (6 ft 5 in)
- Weight: 120 kg (18 st 13 lb)
- Position: Prop
Club
Years	Team	Pld	T	G	FG	P
2012–19	South Sydney	149	13	0	0	52
2020–21	Wigan Warriors	8	1	0	0	4
2022	St. George Illawarra	4	0	0	0	0
	Total	161	14	0	0	56
Representative
Years	Team	Pld	T	G	FG	P
2012	England Knights	2	2	0	0	8
2013–18	England	15	2	0	0	8
- Relatives: Tom Burgess (brother); Luke Burgess (brother); Sam Burgess (brother)

George Burgess (born 21 April 1992) is an English former professional rugby league footballer who last played as a prop for the Cairns Brothers in the Cairns District Rugby League.

He previously played for the South Sydney Rabbitohs with whom he won the 2014 NRL Grand Final, St. George Illawarra Dragons, Wigan Warriors in the Super League and for the England Knights and England at international level.

== Background ==
Burgess was born on 21 April 1992 in Dewsbury, West Yorkshire. His father, Mark Burgess who died of Motor neurone disease, was also a rugby league footballer who played for Nottingham City, Rochdale Hornets, Dewsbury and Hunslet; while his mother, Julie, is a teacher, currently employed at The Scots College in Bellevue Hill, Sydney. His eldest brother Luke, middle brother Sam, and elder twin brother Tom, are all professional rugby league footballers as well. Burgess attended Castle Hall Academy to receive a secondary education before becoming a professional rugby league footballer.

His twin brother Tom Burgess, and older brothers Sam Burgess and Luke Burgess are also professional rugby league players where they all played for the South Sydney Rabbitohs.

He is married to Joanna King and have three children together.

In 2023 he played a minor role of a bouncer in the Australian seasonal film Christmess.

== Early career ==
George represented England against the Australian Schoolboys in 2010 while playing lower grades and training with the full squad of the Bradford Bulls. On 1 January 2011 George was signed by the South Sydney Rabbitohs to play in the National Youth Competition and NRL in the future.

== Club career ==
=== 2012 ===
In Round 13 of the 2012 NRL season, Burgess made his NRL début for the South Sydney Rabbitohs against the Canterbury-Bankstown Bulldogs off the interchange bench in the Rabbitohs 23–18 loss at ANZ Stadium. Burgess played 3 matches for South Sydney in his début year in the NRL in the 2012 NRL season.

=== 2013 ===
In the 2013 NRL season Round 1 season opening match against the Sydney Roosters, Burgess scored his first NRL career try in South Sydney's 28–10 win at SFS. After South Sydney's 30–24 victory over the Gold Coast Titans at Barlow Park in Cairns in Round 14, Burgess was stood down three weeks for smashing a car window with a street sign in Cairns, In June 2013, a naked leaked selfie of Burgess was posted on social media. In August 2013, in Round 25 against the Wests Tigers the Burgess brothers became the first set of four brothers to line up in the same Australian side since Ray, Roy, Rex and Bernard Norman played for Sydney's Annandale club in the 1910 NSWRFL season. The brothers played in the Rabbitohs 32–18 win at SFS. Burgess finished South Sydney's 2013 NRL season with him playing in 24 matches and scoring seven tries. On 1 October 2013, Burgess was named the 2013 Dally M Rookie of Year capping of a stellar year for the South Sydney club.

=== 2014 ===
On 5 October 2014, in South Sydney's 2014 NRL Grand Final against the Canterbury-Bankstown Bulldogs, Burgess played at prop and scored an incredible try in South Sydney's 30–6 victory, alongside his brothers Thomas and Sam Burgess. Burgess finished off his solid year with the South Sydney Rabbitohs in the 2014 NRL season with him playing 23 matches and scoring three tries.

=== 2015 ===
On 23 January 2015, Burgess was named in the South Sydney Rabbitohs tournament winning 2015 NRL Auckland Nines squad. On 23 February 2015, Burgess played for South Sydney in the 2015 World Club Challenge match against 2014 Super League Grand Final premiers St. Helens, playing at prop and received the Man of the Match award in Souths 39–0 win at Langtree Park. In Round 26 against the Sydney Roosters, Burgess was placed on a contrary conduct charge after he threw a water bottle at Roosters forward Kane Evans as he was walking off the field to the sideline; Burgess was sitting on the interchange bench at the time of the incident in South Sydney's 30–0 loss at Sydney Football Stadium. Later on 10 September 2015, Burgess was unsuccessful in his downgrade bid at the NRL Judiciary and received a two match suspension. South Sydney later bowed out the Finals race after getting beaten 28–12 by the Cronulla-Sutherland Sharks in Week 1 of the 2015 NRL Finals series. Burgess finished the 2015 NRL season with him playing in 24 matches and scoring one try for the South Sydney club.

=== 2016 ===
Burgess finished the 2016 NRL season with him playing in 17 matches for the South Sydney club.

=== 2017 ===
In March 2017, days before the Rabbitohs season opening match against the Wests Tigers, Burgess was dropped from the team and was sent to play for North Sydney Bears in the NSW Cup after he failed to impress coach Michael Maguire in the pre-season trial matches and was outshone by the likes of youngster Zane Musgrove to the starting front-row position. Maguire gave Burgess a blunt ultimatum "Fire up or flounder in reserve grade". Maguire also commenting, "It's about performance in this club and he knows the areas that he needs to improve on. "Someone like David Tyrell and Zane Musgrove have excelled in these earlier games. Each week we'll look at who we need to carry and this week we've gone with those two boys."

In Round 3, Burgess was sent to the sin bin and later suspended for three matches after elbowing Newcastle player Mitch Barnett in the face during South Sydney's 24–18 victory. In Round 8 against the Brisbane Broncos, Burgess was put on report for a shoulder charge on Broncos five-eighth Anthony Milford during the Rabbitohs 25–24 loss at ANZ Stadium. After facing the NRL judiciary, Burgess copped a four-match suspension which eventually rubbed him out to play for England in their test match against Samoa. In Round 15 against the Gold Coast Titans, Burgess played his 100th NRL career match in the Rabbitohs 36–20 win at ANZ Stadium. Burgess finished the 2017 NRL season with him playing in 18 matches for the Rabbitohs.

On 6 December 2017, Burgess signed an extension contract with Souths keeping him at the club until the end of 2019.

=== 2018 ===
Burgess enjoyed a return to form in 2018 with South Sydney finishing third on the table at the end of the regular season. Burgess made 27 appearances for Souths as the club made it all the way to the preliminary final before being defeated 12-4 by eventual premiers the Sydney Roosters. He underwent surgery on his nose at the end of the season, having only 10% breathing capacity.

=== 2019 ===
Burgess made his first start for Souths in round 4 of the 2019 NRL season against Manly-Warringah which ended in a 13–12 loss. Burgess then played in the next seven games for South Sydney which were all victories and had the club sitting on top of the table after 11 rounds. In round 14 against Wests Tigers, Burgess was placed on report after allegedly attempting to gouge the eyes of Wests player Robbie Farah. Souths would go on to lose the game 14–9 at the new Western Sydney Stadium. After the match, the incident was referred immediately to the match review committee. On 2 July 2019, Burgess was found guilty of the eye gouge on Farah and received a nine match ban from the NRL judiciary. This was the longest such ban imposed for an eye gouge incident in NRL history, partially due to the fact that in the previous year's season, Burgess was guilty of another eye gouging offence.

On 29 July, Burgess signed a three-year deal with the Wigan Warriors on a three-year deal from the Super League XXV season.

In the qualifying final against arch rivals the Sydney Roosters, Burgess made his return from a nine match suspension as Souths were defeated 30–6 at the Sydney Cricket Ground.

Further into 2019, Burgess made his acting debut in the Australian/New Zealand crime thriller Locusts (film) playing a bouncer named Ivan.

=== 2020 ===
Burgess made his debut for Wigan against Warrington in the opening round of the Super League XXV season. During the match, Burgess was flattened by Warrington player Ben Murdoch-Masila after he attempted to tackle the player on his way to the try line. Wigan would go on to win the match 16–10.

Burgess only made eight appearances, scoring one try, for Wigan before a major hip injury ended his season. In February 2021 the club announced that by mutual consent with Burgess he was being released from his contract and after an operation on his hip scheduled for March 2021 would spend most of the rest of the year undergoing a physical rehabilitation programme.

=== 2021 ===
On 9 August, it was announced that Burgess would be making a return to the NRL and had signed a two-and-a-half-year contract with St. George Illawarra.

On 25 August, Burgess was charged with malicious damage by Wollongong Police after an alleged road-side incident. Police alleged that Burgess became involved in a verbal altercation on the 23 August with a 32-year-old man, before he allegedly grabbed the man's phone and threw it on the road. Burgess was ordered to appear at Wollongong Local Court on October 19. On 19 October, Burgess was given a 12-month conditional release order requiring him to be of good behaviour for the next year.

=== 2022 ===
In round 2 of the 2022 NRL season, Burgess made his club debut for St. George Illawarra in their loss to Penrith at Kogarah Oval. On 23 March, it was announced that Burgess had been arrested and charged by NSW Police for allegedly touching a woman sexually without their consent. Burgess was ordered to appear at court on 13 April 2022. On 23 July, Burgess announced he was stepping down from playing and planned to enter a rehabilitation facility to deal with gambling and depression. On 17 October, Burgess was released by St. George Illawarra. Burgess revealed his frustration at coach Anthony Griffin for only allowing him to play four games, noting "there is no point me going back there if the coach doesn’t believe in me". Burgess subsequently announced his retirement citing his ongoing hip injury as the reason on 27 November 2022.

=== 2023 ===
In April, it was announced by Burgess that he had signed for Cairns Brothers in the Cairns District Rugby League competition. After winning the local Cairns premiership with Cairns Brothers, Burgess announced that he would be retiring for a second time.

=== 2024 ===
On 11 March, Burgess pleaded not guilty to a single charge of sexually touching another person without consent while at the woman’s home in March 2022.

=== 2025 ===
On 13 September, Burgess became a founder of Dukbill, a document collection service for mortgage brokers.

== International career ==
In October 2012, Burgess also played for the England Knights team.

George was selected in England's 2013 Rugby League World Cup squad. Burgess featured in the 15–14 friendly loss to Italy. In England's first pool match against Australia, Burgess scored his first international try for England, playing at prop in the 28–20 loss at Millennium Stadium. In the Semi-final match against New Zealand, Burgess late high tackle on Sonny Bill Williams resulted in a penalty that gave New Zealand the field position to steal a late 20–18 victory in the last minute of the game at Wembley Stadium. Burgess received the Rugby League International Federation's Rookie of the Year award for 2013. Burgess played in 5 matches and scored 1 try (4p) in the tournament.

On 6 October 2014, Burgess was selected in the England national rugby league team Final 24-man squad for the Four Nations series. Burgess played in 3 matches in the tournament.

On 10 October 2016, Burgess was selected in the England 24-man squad for the 2016 Four Nations. Burgess played in all 3 matches off the interchange bench of the tournament.

Burgess was not selected in The England squad for the 2017 rugby league world cup held in Australia although his brothers Sam Burgess and Thomas Burgess were selected.

In 2018 he was selected for England against France at the Leigh Sports Village.

On 6 November 2018, Burgess was suspended for four matches after being found guilty of eye gouging Dallin Watene-Zelezniak during England's 20–14 victory over New Zealand. The suspension meant that Burgess would miss the start of the 2019 NRL season.

== Post playing ==
Burgess would turn to acting after his retirement from rugby league, he appeared alongside Daniel McPherson in Beast.

== Filmography ==
=== Films ===
Year	Title	Role	Notes
2019	Locusts	Bouncer	Feature film
2023	Christmess	Doorman/bouncer	Feature film
2024	Land of Bad	Private Cooper	Feature film
2026	Beast	Neal	Feature film
2026	The Weight	Letender	Feature film

== Professional boxing record ==
1 fight	0 wins	1 loss
By knockout	0	1

No.	Result	Record	Opponent	Type	Round, time	Date	Location	Notes
1	Loss	3-0	Nelson Asofa-Solomona	TKO	3 (1m.26)	24 Jun 2026	Pat Rafter Arena, Brisbane, Australia	debut
