= Hubert Houldsworth =

British barrister, businessman and politician

Sir Hubert Stanley Houldsworth, 1st Baronet, QC (20 April 1889 – 1 February 1956) was a barrister, Chairman of the National Coal Board and a British Liberal Party politician.

== Background ==
Houldsworth was the son of Albert Edward Houldsworth and Susannah Buckley. He was educated at Heckmondwike Grammar School and the University of Leeds, where in 1911 he received a Bachelor of Science with First Class Honours in Physics and in 1912 a Master of Science. In 1925 he was awarded a Doctor of Science. In 1919 he married Hilda Frances Clegg of Cleckheaton, Yorkshire. They had one son, Harold Basil. In 1944 he received a Knighthood. In 1951 he received an honorary LLD from Leeds University. In 1956 he was awarded a Baronetcy in the 1956 New Year Honours.

== Professional career ==
Houldsworth was Assistant Lecturer in the University of Leeds from 1919 to 1926. In 1926 he received a Call to Bar by Lincoln's Inn. From September 1936 to July 1942, he served as the Independent Chairman of the District Co-ordinating Committee of the Midland (Amalgamated) District (Coal Mines) Scheme 1930. In 1937 he became a King's Counsel. He was Joint Coal Supplies Officer for the Midland Area (Mines Department) from September 1939 – July 1942. He was Fuel and Power Controller (North-Eastern Region), Board of Trade, November 1941 – July 1942. He was Regional Controller (South and West Yorkshire), Ministry of Fuel and Power from 1942 to 1944. In 1943 he became a Bencher. He was Controller-General from 1944 to 1945. He was Chairman of the East Midlands Division of the National Coal Board from 1946 to 1951. He was Recorder of Doncaster from 1946 to 1948. In 1951 he was appointed Chairman of the National Coal Board.

== Political career ==
Houldsworth was a Liberal and in July 1927 he was selected as Liberal prospective parliamentary candidate for the Pudsey and Otley division of Yorkshire. He contested the seat at the 1929 General Election but finished third;

General Election 1929: Pudsey and Otley Electorate 49,945
Party	Candidate	Votes	%	±%
Unionist	Charles Granville Gibson	16,729		
Labour	Cllr. A W Brown	12,336		
Liberal	Hubert Stanley Houldsworth	11,685		
Majority		4,393		
Turnout				
Unionist hold		Swing		

He did not stand for parliament again. After the Liberal Party split in 1931, Houldsworth, defended the actions of Sir John Simon and his breakaway Liberal Nationals. Simon was the MP for Spen Valley and Houldsworth lived in his constituency and was a member of the local Liberal Association. He continued to support Liberal and Liberal National candidates.

== Houldsworth baronets ==
The Houldsworth Baronetcy, of Heckmondwike in the West Riding of the County of York, was created in the Baronetage of the United Kingdom on 25 January 1956. Houldsworth was awarded it for his role as Chairman of the National Coal Board. When he died a week later, the title passed to his son Basil Houldsworth.

Baronetage of the United Kingdom
New creation	Baronet (of Heckmondwike); 1956 – 1956	Succeeded by Harold Basil Houldsworth
