= Joe Seddon =

British technology entrepreneur and the founder of Zero Gravity

Joe Seddon BEM
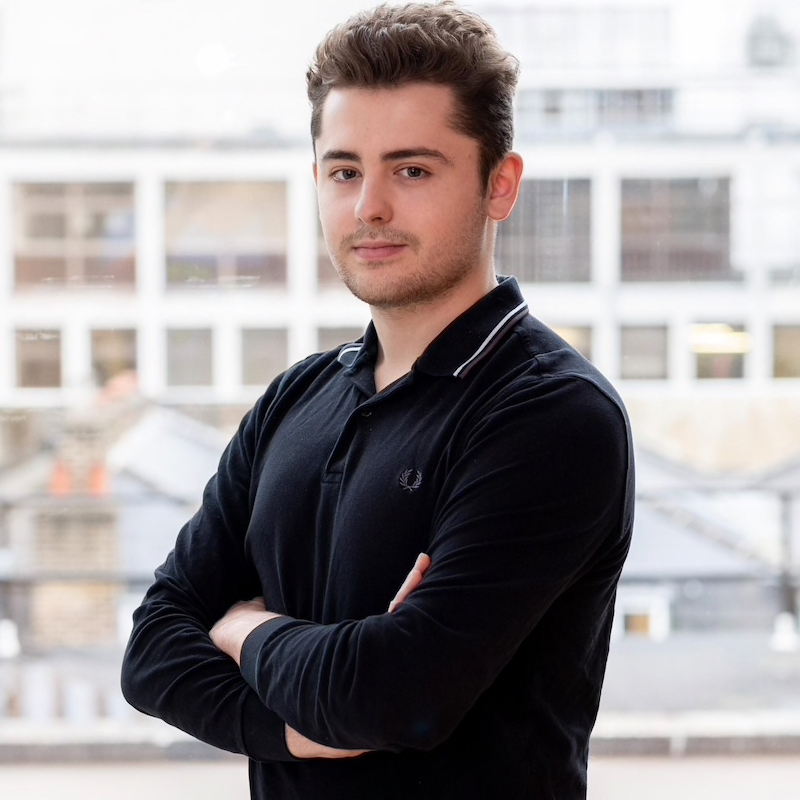
- Seddon in London, 2020
- Born: Joseph Henry Seddon; 4 June 1997 (age 29); Leeds, England
- Education: Heckmondwike Grammar School
- Alma mater: University of Oxford (BA)
- Occupations: Chief Executive Officer; Entrepreneur
- Known for: Founder & CEO, Zero Gravity
- Awards: Forbes 30 Under 30; Tech Entrepreneur of the Year; Point of Light Award
- Website: joeseddon.com

Joseph Henry Seddon BEM (born 4 June 1997) is a British technology entrepreneur who is the founder of Zero Gravity, a technology company that supports students from low-opportunity backgrounds into universities and careers.

Since its inception, Zero Gravity has supported over 23,000 students from low-opportunity backgrounds into UK universities, including more than 1,000 into Oxbridge. In 2026, Zero Gravity was selected by the UK Government to develop AI tutoring tools for 450,000 disadvantaged students in UK state schools.

Seddon was named in the Forbes 30 Under 30 list in 2022, and he was honoured in King Charles III's 2023 Birthday Honours for services to social mobility. In 2024, The Sunday Times featured Seddon in their inaugural Young Power List as one of "the 25 most inspiring people aged 30 and under in the UK".

== Early life and education ==
Seddon was born in Leeds, West Yorkshire, in June 1997 and was raised in a single-parent family by his mother, Catherine, who works as a speech therapist in the National Health Service. He grew up in Morley, West Yorkshire, a post-industrial town previously known for its textile and coal mining industries. In 2018, Morley was ranked in the bottom half of English constituencies on the Social Mobility Index, which measures how likely a person from a disadvantaged background is to progress to a higher socioeconomic status later in life.

Seddon was educated at Westerton Primary Academy, a state primary school in Morley, West Yorkshire. He then studied at Heckmondwike Grammar School, a state grammar school in Kirklees, West Yorkshire, securing 12 A* grades at GCSE and 3 A* grades at A-level. In his later years at school, Seddon was involved in competitive debating, where he won a number of regional and national awards.

Seddon has stated that, for most of his time at school, attending a prestigious university “wasn’t really on my radar”. It was only after being questioned about applying to Oxbridge during a live radio interview on BBC Radio Leeds when opening his GCSE results that he began to entertain the possibility seriously. However, Seddon struggled to navigate the Oxbridge application process, describing the interview as “almost like arriving on a different planet”.

Seddon was ultimately successful in receiving a place to study Philosophy, Politics and Economics (PPE) at Mansfield College, Oxford, and graduated in 2018 with first-class honours. While studying at Oxford, Seddon received a £6,500 means-tested bursary from the university to fund his living costs. During Seddon’s final year at Oxford, not a single student from his home constituency of Morley & Outwood was admitted to study at the university.

Alongside his university studies, Seddon was an occasional contributor to The Daily Telegraph, where he wrote articles about reforming Britain's higher education system. He also completed a summer vacation scheme at Magic Circle law firm, Slaughter and May, and turned down the offer of a training contract at the firm to instead focus on his entrepreneurial pursuits.

== Career ==
=== Zero Gravity ===
After graduating from the University of Oxford in 2018, Seddon founded Access Oxbridge, a mobile app supporting students from low-income backgrounds to win places at the universities of Oxford and Cambridge. The app matched students with mentors currently studying at Oxford and Cambridge for weekly support via hour-long video calls to navigate the university admissions process. Seddon built the app from his bedroom in Morley, West Yorkshire, and initially funded the initiative from the final £200 of his student loan. By 2020, 110 low-income students mentored on the app had received offers to study at Oxford and Cambridge. This led Seddon to receive the Points of Light award from the Prime Minister for social impact in education.

In 2020, following media coverage of his work, Seddon raised £425,000 from social impact investors, and relaunched the app as Zero Gravity. Zero Gravity aims to increase social mobility by developing technology to support high-potential students from low-opportunity backgrounds into highly-selective universities and careers. Zero Gravity uses an algorithm to identify students from the lowest 40 per cent of socioeconomic backgrounds who show indicators of academic potential, drawing on a network of over 800 state schools connected to the platform. Identified students receive mentoring, masterclasses, scholarships and access to internships and job opportunities through the platform.

By 2021, over 1,000 students mentored by Zero Gravity had achieved offers to study at Russell Group universities. In June 2021, Seddon received the Diana Award in memory of Princess Diana for social impact in the education sector. In December 2021, Seddon confirmed that he had raised a seed investment round in Zero Gravity totalling £3.5 million, with notable investors including private equity magnates such as Thor Björgólfsson, Guy Hands, and Stephen Peel. In 2022, Seddon was named by Forbes in the Forbes 30 Under 30 list.

Zero Gravity subsequently scaled its university admissions work across the UK. By April 2024, the platform had supported more than 8,000 students into Russell Group universities, including more than 800 into Oxbridge, with Seddon stating that one in four low-income students starting at Oxbridge had come through the platform. As of 2026, the company states that it has supported more than 23,000 students into university, including more than 1,000 into Oxbridge.

As its members progressed through university, Zero Gravity expanded beyond admissions into careers, partnering with employers to recruit students from low-opportunity backgrounds into internships and graduate roles. Its partners have included HSBC, KPMG, McKinsey, Rolls Royce and Snapchat. Zero Gravity has also scaled the numbers of scholarships awarded through its platform, with The Times reporting in 2023 that it had deployed over £1.5 million of scholarships. In 2024, Mercedes-Benz Formula One team pledged £438,000 to scholarships through Zero Gravity.

Seddon was awarded the British Empire Medal (BEM) in the 2023 Birthday Honours for services to social mobility. In 2025, Zero Gravity was named as the 36th fastest-growing startup in the UK and Ireland.

In 2026, Zero Gravity launched an AI-powered tutoring product covering STEM subjects at GCSE and A-level, designed around a Socratic coaching approach in which the software guides students through problems step by step rather than providing answers directly. In June 2026, Zero Gravity was announced as one of the companies selected by the Department for Science, Innovation and Technology and the Department for Education to develop AI tutoring tools for UK school students. The government has said the programme could ultimately support up to 450,000 disadvantaged pupils a year.

== Honours and recognition ==
- Point of Light Award for social impact in education (2019)
- Diana Award for social impact in the education sector (2021)
- Forbes 30 Under 30, for social impact in technology (2022)
- British Empire Medal (BEM) in the 2023 Birthday Honours, for services to social mobility (2023)
- Tech Entrepreneur of the Year in the UK Business Tech Awards (2023)
- The Sunday Times Young Power List (2024)

== Other roles ==
Seddon has previously served as a trustee of the British Youth Council, and as a governor of Lister Community School. In 2025, he was appointed by the Department for Culture, Media, and Sport to the advisory board for the UK Government's National Youth Strategy. In May 2026, he was appointed as a trustee of the Royal Voluntary Service.

Seddon is a frequent commentator on education, social mobility, and technology for outlets such as BBC Radio 5 Live, LBC, Times Radio, GB News, and Sky News. He has delivered talks at the Cambridge Union, London Tech Week, Durham Union, and the House of Lords. His work as an entrepreneur has been covered by BBC News, The Times, The Daily Telegraph, and Corriere della Sera.

== Personal life ==
Seddon lives in London and is a Hull City supporter.
