= Basil Houldsworth =

Sir Harold Basil Houldsworth, 2nd Baronet (21 July 1922 – 24 March 1990) was a British anæsthetist and Liberal Party politician.

== Background ==
He was the son of Sir Hubert Houldsworth, 1st Baronet and Hilda Frances Clegg. He was educated at Heckmondwike Grammar School, Huddersfield Technical College and Leeds University, where he qualified as a doctor. In 1946 he married Norah Clifford Halmshaw. They had one daughter. When his father died on 1 February 1956, he inherited the Baronetcy.

== Professional career ==
He was senior anaesthetist at Leeds General Infirmary from 1946-48. In 1948 he was called up to serve in the Royal Army Medical Corps and was given the rank of captain. In 1950 he was appointed the Registrar Anæsthetist at Leeds General Infirmary and St James Hospital, Leeds. In 1953 he was appointed Senior Registrar at Sheffield City General Hospital. He was Consultant Anæsthetist at Barnsley and District Hospitals from 1954–87.

== Political career ==
He came from a family with a Liberal tradition. His father contested Pudsey and Otley as Liberal candidate at the 1929 General Election. His mother was elected a Liberal member of the West Riding County Council. He was Liberal candidate for the new Gloucestershire West division at the 1950 General Election. He came third;

1950 United Kingdom general election: Gloucestershire West
Party	Candidate	Votes	%	±%
Labour	Morgan Philips Price	22,765	54.8	n/a
Conservative	Granger F Boston	13,664	32.9	n/a
Liberal	Harold Basil Houldsworth	5,125	12.3	n/a
Majority		9,101	21.9	n/a
Turnout			82.3	n/a

He did not stand for parliament again.

Baronetage of the United Kingdom
Preceded by Hubert Houldsworth	Baronet (of Heckmondwike); 1956–1990	Extinct
