= 2014 NRL Grand Final =

Australian rugby league match

South Sydney Rabbitohs	Canterbury-Bankstown Bulldogs
30	6
	1	2	Total
SOU	6	24	30
CBY	0	6	6
- Date: 5 October 2014
- Stadium: ANZ Stadium
- Location: Sydney
- Clive Churchill Medal: Sam Burgess
- Australian National anthem: Simon Gleeson
- Referee: Shayne Hayne; Gerard Sutton; Steve Carrall (Touch Judge); Jason Walsh (Touch Judge)
- Attendance: 83,833

Broadcast partners
- Broadcasters: Nine Network
- Commentators: Ray Warren Phil Gould Peter Sterling Andrew Johns

The 2014 NRL Grand Final was the concluding and premiership-deciding match of the 2014 NRL season. Played on the evening of Sunday 5 October 2014 at ANZ Stadium, the match was contested by the South Sydney Rabbitohs and the Canterbury-Bankstown Bulldogs. South Sydney won the match with a decisive 30 points to 6 victory, ending a 43-year premiership drought by claiming their 21st title. South Sydney forward Sam Burgess, who suffered a broken cheekbone from the game's opening tackle, was awarded the Clive Churchill Medal as the best player on ground.

The match was preceded by the 2014 National Youth Competition Grand Final and the 2014 NRL State Championship. British-American musician and songwriter Slash and American alternative rock band Train performed at the event as pre-match entertainment, and Simon Gleeson performed the Australian National anthem. The match was broadcast live throughout in Australia by the Nine Network.

== Background ==
=== History ===
Founded in 1908, Souths had won more premierships—20—than any other club. However, they had not appeared in a Grand Final since 1971. Over the subsequent decades, the club had battled financial problems before being excluded from the National Rugby League competition ahead of the 2000 season due to a failure to meet the league's criteria for inclusion. After litigation and high-profile public campaigns, the club was readmitted into the competition for the 2002 season.

For Canterbury, founded in 1934, the Grand Final was the club's 18th. Their most recent Grand Final appearance was a 2012 defeat to Melbourne, with their last premiership coming in 2004 against the Sydney Roosters.

The clubs had met each other in just one previous Grand Final in 1967, with South Sydney prevailing 12–10.

=== 2014 season ===
ANZ Stadium, where the match was played

South Sydney finished the regular season in third position, before defeating Manly and the Sydney Roosters in the finals series. Canterbury finished in seventh place, and made the grand final after successive sudden-death victories over Melbourne, Manly and Penrith.

Both sides had met each other twice during the course of the season, in rounds 7 and 25. The two teams were tied with one each, with Canterbury winning the first encounter 15–14, and South Sydney winning the second encounter 21–14.

== Teams ==
South Sydney Rabbitohs	Position	Canterbury Bankstown Bulldogs
Greg Inglis	Fullback	Sam Perrett
Alex Johnston	Wing	Corey Thompson
Dylan Walker	Centre	Josh Morris
Kirisome Auva'a	Centre	Tim Lafai
Lote Tuqiri	Wing	Mitch Brown
Luke Keary	Five-eighth	Josh Reynolds
Adam Reynolds	Halfback	Trent Hodkinson (c)
George Burgess	Prop	Aiden Tolman
Apisai Koroisau	Hooker	Moses Mbye
Dave Tyrrell	Prop	James Graham (c)
Ben Te'o	2nd Row	Josh Jackson
John Sutton (c)	2nd Row	Tony Williams
Sam Burgess	Lock	Greg Eastwood
Jason Clark	Interchange	Tim Browne
Kyle Turner	Interchange	Dale Finucane
Chris McQueen	Interchange	David Klemmer
Tom Burgess	Interchange	Frank Pritchard
Michael Maguire	Coach	Des Hasler

Both teams' first choice hookers were ruled out from playing in the week leading up to the Grand Final:

- For South Sydney, Issac Luke was suspended for a dangerous throw in the Preliminary Final against Sonny Bill Williams of the Sydney Roosters and was replaced by Apisai Koroisau.
- For Canterbury, captain Michael Ennis withdrew after suffering a fractured foot in the Preliminary Final against the Penrith Panthers; he was replaced by Moses Mbye as hooker, and the captaincy was shared between James Graham and Trent Hodkinson.

== Match report ==
2014 NRL Grand Final

Sunday, 5 October
19:35 AEDT (UTC+11)

South Sydney Rabbitohs	30 – 6	Canterbury-Bankstown Bulldogs
Tries: 5 Johnston 20'; G Burgess 56'; Auva'a 73'; Reynolds 78'; Inglis 80'; Goals: 5 Reynolds pen 27', 57', pen 64', 75', 79' (5/7); S Burgess (0/1)	1st: 6–0; 2nd: 24–6; Report	Tries: 1 Williams 49'; Goals: 1 Hodkinson 50' (1/1)

ANZ Stadium, Sydney
Attendance: 83,833
Referees: Shayne Hayne, Gerard Sutton
Video referee: Bernard Sutton, Luke Phillips
Touch judges: Steve Carrall, Jason Walsh
Clive Churchill Medal: Sam Burgess (South Sydney)

The first half of the match was a low-scoring affair. There was only one try—to South Sydney's Alex Johnston—while Adam Reynolds kicked a penalty goal to give Souths a 6–0 half-time lead. Canterbury equalised ten minutes into the second half through a converted try to Tony Williams. George Burgess restored Souths' lead shortly thereafter, before further tries to Kirisome Auva'a, Reynolds and Greg Inglis in the final ten minutes of the match. The final score was Souths 30, Canterbury 6.

Souths' Sam Burgess played the entire match, despite fracturing his cheekbone and eye socket in contact in the opening tackle with James Graham. He was awarded the Clive Churchill Medal, as the man of the match in the grand final. Souths player Dave Tyrrell was stretchered from the field after he was knocked out in the 68th minute following a head clash with Canterbury player James Graham.

Fullback Greg Inglis, who scored the final try of the game in the final minute of play, won his first valid premiership ring after previously featuring in the Melbourne Storm's 2007 and 2009 sides which had their premierships stripped from them due to salary cap breaches.

== Opening Games ==
=== U20s Grand Final ===
Sunday, 5 October
1:30pm (AEDT)

New Zealand Warriors U20s	34 – 32	Brisbane Broncos U20s

ANZ Stadium, Sydney

=== NRL State Championship ===
Sunday, 5 October
3:50pm (AEDT)

Penrith Panthers	28 – 32	Northern Pride

ANZ Stadium, Sydney

== Entertainment ==
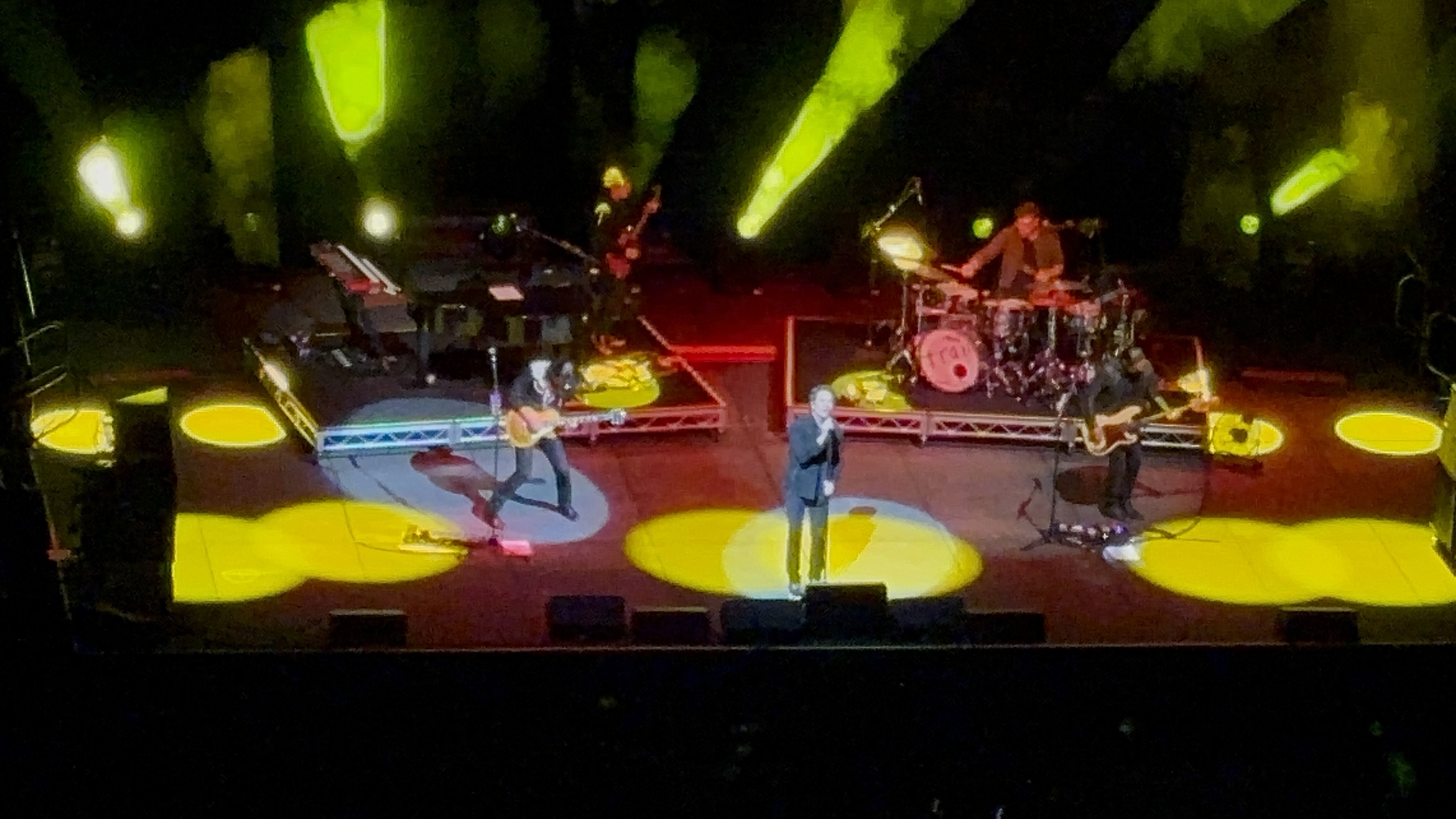
Train (pictured in 2025) headlined the pre-match entertainment.

Former Guns N' Roses guitarist Slash performed "Bent To Fly" from World on Fire, with the accompanying vocal track by Myles Kennedy being played over loudspeaker. The performance of the song was accompanied by a montage of the 2014 NRL season on ANZ Stadium's screens. Slash also performed the guitar riff from Guns N' Roses' "Sweet Child o' Mine", before closing the set with an improvised solo.

Train performed as the main act, playing "Hey, Soul Sister", "Angel in Blue Jeans", and "Drops of Jupiter".

== Match Officials ==
Shayne Hayne and Gerard Sutton were the match referees. It was Hayne's fourth grand final as he has officiated in the 2009, 2010 and 2013 grand finals. It was Sutton's first grand final as referee.

Steve Carrol and Jason Walsh were the touch judges, and the video referees were Bernard Sutton and Luke Phillips. The standby referee was Ben Cummins and the standby touch judge was Brett Suttor.

== Records ==
The 2014 NRL Grand Final was the most-watched club game in the history of rugby league, with a five-city average television audience of 2.597 million, with a peak of 3.098 million viewers. Combined with 1.354 million regional viewers tuning in, the game had an average audience of 3.951 million viewers, and a national peak audience of 4.650 million viewers.

The crowd of 83,833 was the largest attendance at a sporting event at Stadium Australia since its 2001 reconfiguration.

== Post-match ==
Souths' premiership victory qualified them for the 2015 World Club Challenge, their first ever appearance in the end of year event, in which they beat St. Helens RFC 39-0 at Langtree Park.

== See also ==
- 2014 NRL season
- NRL Premiership winners
