= Heckmondwike Grammar School =

Grammar school in Heckmondwike, West Yorkshire, England

Location
- High Street; Heckmondwike, West Yorkshire, WF16 0AH; England; 53°42′29″N 1°40′09″W

Information
- Other name: HGS
- Type: Academy Converter
- Motto: Latin: Nil Sine Labore (Nothing without Hard Work)
- Established: 1898
- Local authority: Kirklees Council
- Trust: Heckmondwike Grammar School Academy Trust
- Department for Education URN: 136283 Tables
- Ofsted: Reports
- Head teacher: Peter Roberts
- Staff: 170
- Gender: Mixed
- Age range: 11–18
- Enrolment: 1,468 (2026)
- Capacity: 1,400
- Houses: Bronte Clarke Houldsworth Priestley
- Colours: Yellow, Brown
- Publication: The Heckler
- Newspaper: Heckler
- Website: www.heckgrammar.co.uk

Heckmondwike Grammar School (HGS) is an 11–18 co-educational, charitable grammar school and sixth form with academy status in Heckmondwike, West Yorkshire, England.

== History ==
The school was built by the Heckmondwike School Board after it was compelled by the Board of Education to replace various schools across Heckmondwike. The Board began the process in January 1894, and despite much controversy, the building of the school had finished by late 1897. Arthur Alfred Stott of Mirfield was the architect. The school opened on 17 January 1898, with an attendance of 907, with around 150–160 attending the School of Science. The School's Main Hall, now known as the Swann Hall, was named by the School Board after Dr K Swann, a former Chair of Governors.

Following the Education Act 1902 and the wider development of Secondary Education across the country, the Higher Grade School became the Secondary School, as the infant's section was moved into another building. It would be renamed Heckmondwike Grammar School in late 1929.

Further north in Cleckheaton was Whitcliffe Mount Grammar School, now Whitcliffe Mount School. The existence of Secondary Education across the Spen Valley was decisive as both Heckmondwike and Cleckheaton desired to have the major secondary school in their respective locality. Eventually, Whitcliffe Mount was created after the failure of the West Riding County Council to solve the Spen Valley Question.

HGS was a foundation school, but became an academy in September 2010.

On 18 January 2011, the Crellin Building was officially opened by Prince Edward, with Ingrid Roscoe and the mayor of Kirklees.

In December 2018, the headteacher at the time, Nathan Bulley, quit following allegations of mismanagement.

On 30 January 2019, the former HGS Annexe cum 'Jo Cox Centre' was opened. This new development which made use of an old physical education and social sciences building enabled the school to provide a building solely for the private use of those attending the school's selective sixth form.

== Admissions ==
HGS is a Technology College. The school has approximately 1,500 pupils aged between 11 and 18 and includes a sixth form.

Prospective pupils pass examinations Creative Writing, English, comprehension and mathematics before entry to the school. After testing, 180–210 pupils are accepted.

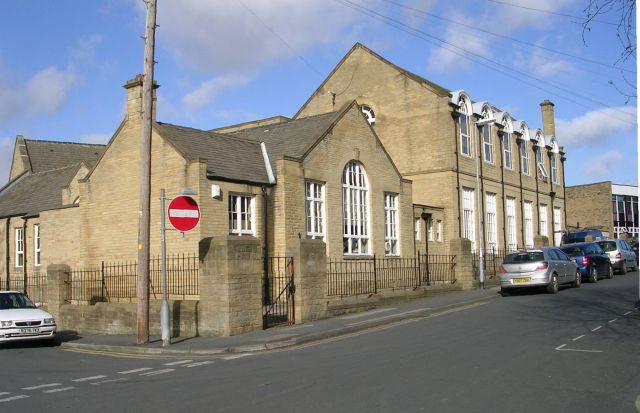
Rear of the school

== Curriculum and performance ==
Heckmondwike Grammar School follows the English National Curriculum.

In 2010 and 2013/2014 the school was ranked the 5th best-performing school in England for GCSE results. and is regularly among the top 100 state schools in the country.

In December 2022, Heckmondwike Grammar School was ranked the 2nd best school in the North of England, based on GCSE results.

The school repeatedly achieves high in the national rankings for both GCSE and A-Level examination results. The school has a KS4 progress score of 0.97, as well as a point score of 40.22 at A-Level.

More recently, the school achieved an Ofsted report under the new framework, with Strong Standards seen in six areas, and Expected Standards seen for the Sixth Form. Inspectors praised the school, noting that pupils develop 'detailed knowledge over time' and produce 'very high-quality work' across their subjects. Ofsted also reported that 'Teachers have excellent subject knowledge' and that 'GCSE results are among some of the best nationally', including for disadvantaged pupils.

Headmasters

- 1897–1924 — R. S. Cahill
- 1924–1948 — Harold Edwards
- 1948–1952 — E. G. Bennett
- 1952–1956 — E. J. S. Kyte
- 1956–1970 — Kenneth Ford, Quaker and Second World War conscientious objector who joined the Friends' Ambulance Unit
- 1970–1989 — T. C. Riddles
- 1989–1990 — J. K. Wilson (acting head)
- 1990–2010 — Mark Crellin Tweedle
- 2010–2016 — Mike Cook
- 2016–2018 — Nathan Bulley
- 2019–present — Peter Roberts

== Notable alumni ==
- John Bentley – retired English rugby union and rugby league footballer
- Tracy Brabin – actress, television writer, Labour Party MP for Batley and Spen 2016–2021, Mayor of West Yorkshire (2021–present)
- Luke Burgess – former professional rugby league footballer; older brother of Sam
- Sam Burgess – South Sydney Rabbitohs coach and former rugby league player
- Roger Burnley (born 1966) – businessman, former CEO of Asda
- Jo Cox, late Labour MP for Batley and Spen 2015–2016
- John Fozard – late engineer, chief designer of the Hawker Siddeley Harrier from 1965 to 1978
- Emily Freeman – retired runner, 2008 Olympic relay team member, 2009 European Team Championships team member
- Andrew Gale – professional cricketer, former Yorkshire County Cricket Club captain (2016–2021)
- Sir Basil Houldsworth, 2nd Baronet – late Liberal politician and anaesthetist
- Sir Hubert Houldsworth, 1st Baronet – late barrister, National Coal Board chairman, and Liberal politician
- Kim Leadbeater – Labour politician and Batley and Spen MP (2021–2024), Spen Valley MP (2024-present); younger sister of Jo Cox
- Michael McGowan – journalist, former Labour MEP for Leeds
- Frederick Campion Steward – late botanist and Cornell University professor
- Joe Seddon – entrepreneur, founder of Zero Gravity
