= Luke Burgess (rugby league) =

English rugby league footballer

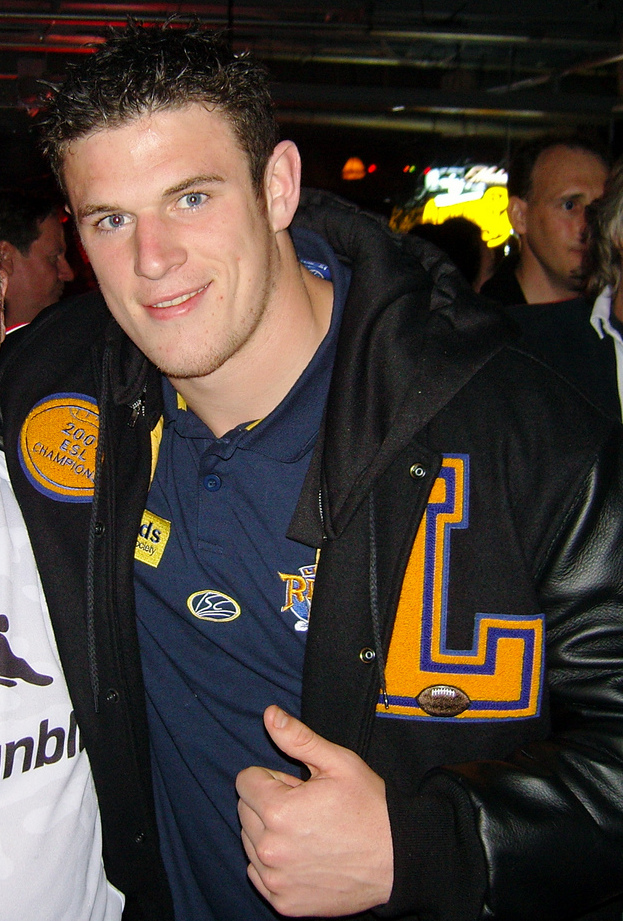

Personal information
- Born: 20 February 1987 (age 39) Liversedge, West Yorkshire, England

Playing information
- Height: 194 cm (6 ft 4 in)
- Weight: 112 kg (17 st 9 lb)
- Position: Prop
Club
Years	Team	Pld	T	G	FG	P
2007–10	Leeds Rhinos	81	6	0	0	24
2007(loan)	→ Doncaster	9	1	0	0	4
2007(loan)	→ Harlequins RL	3	0	0	0	0
2011–14	South Sydney	51	2	0	0	8
2015–16	Manly Sea Eagles	19	0	0	0	0
2016	Salford Red Devils	8	0	0	0	0
2017	Catalans Dragons	5	0	0	0	0
2018	Salford Red Devils	15	0	1	0	2
	Total	191	9	1	0	38
- Relatives: George Burgess (brother); Tom Burgess (brother); Sam Burgess (brother)

Luke Burgess (born 20 February 1987) is an English former professional rugby league footballer who last played for the Salford Red Devils in the Super League. Luke Burgess is the brother of fellow rugby league players Sam, George and Tom Burgess. He previously played in the NRL for the South Sydney Rabbitohs and the Manly-Warringah Sea Eagles.

== Background ==
Burgess was born on 20 February 1987 in Liversedge, Kirklees, West Yorkshire, England.

His late father, Mark Burgess who died of Motor neurone disease, was also a rugby league footballer who played for Nottingham City, Rochdale Hornets, Dewsbury and Hunslet; whilst his mother Julie is a teacher, currently employed at The Scots College in Bellevue Hill, Sydney. His younger brothers Sam, Tom and George play professional rugby league with the South Sydney Rabbitohs, while Sam previously played rugby union for Bath Rugby.

He attended Heckmondwike Grammar School to receive a secondary education before becoming a professional rugby league footballer. He played his junior rugby for Dewsbury Moor, and also played for Liversedge Cricket Club.

== Professional playing career ==
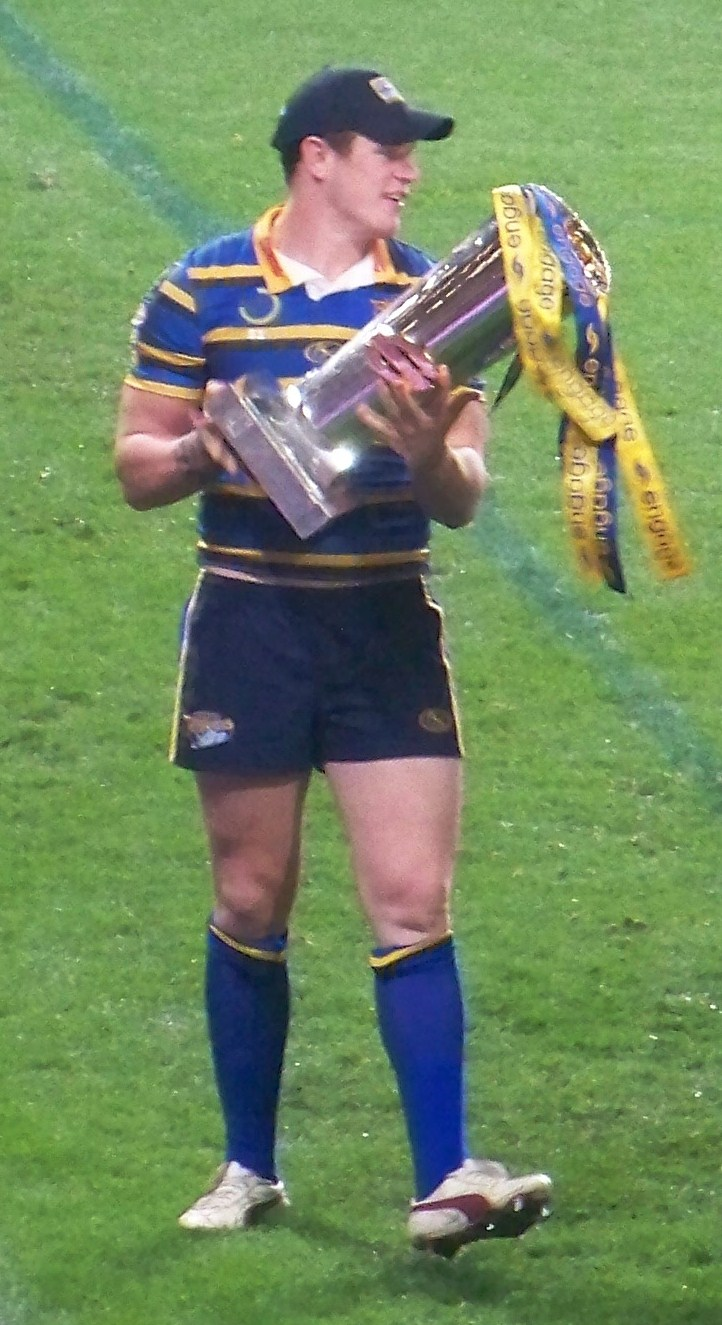
Luke Burgess with the Super League trophy in 2009.

=== Super League ===
Burgess played prop for the Leeds Rhinos having previously been on loan to Harlequins RL and Doncaster.

Burgess' début game was against Castleford Tigers at Wheldon Road, Leeds lost this game. Burgess scored his first try on his second game against Harlequins RL. At the end of the 2008 season, Burgess became the inaugural winner of the Albert Goldthorpe Rookie of the Year Award, presented by the leading trade newspaper, Rugby Leaguer & League Express.

In 2009, Burgess played in 28 games, however, he only scored one try for the club against Salford City Reds, compared to five tries from only five appearances in 2008.

He played in the 2009 Super League Grand Final victory over St. Helens at Old Trafford.

On 21 June 2011 it was confirmed that Luke had signed for the South Sydney Rabbitohs, joining brothers Sam and George at the club who play in the Australian NRL. Brother Tom Burgess came later.

=== National Rugby League ===
During the 2011 NRL season Burgess was named to make his NRL début for Souths having been in Australia for less than two weeks. Luke was included in England's 2012 training squad but ultimately never played an international game.

In May 2013, model Yolanda Hodgson who had been a contestant on Australia's Next Top Model in 2011, gave birth to the couple's first child, daughter Grace Luca. In August 2013, the Burgess brothers became the first set of four brothers to line up in the same Australian side since Ray, Roy, Rex and Bernard Norman played for Sydney's Annandale club in the 1910 NSWRFL season. However Luke missed out on the clubs 2014 premiership after he was named on the extended bench for their grand final victory over the Bulldogs.

In 2015, he joined the Manly Warringah Sea Eagles, after being granted an early leave by the South Sydney Rabbitohs, after an incident at a club after the Rabbitohs' high-altitude training camp in Arizona, United States. It was alleged that a doorman working at an Arizona bar had told Burgess and South Sydney captain John Sutton to leave as they were intoxicated. Sutton allegedly became restless and Burgess got into a fight with the bouncer. Images were released of the pair handcuffed. The bouncer eventually dropped all charges after reaching an agreement with the two players.
