= Sam Burgess =

England international dual-code rugby footballer & rugby league coach

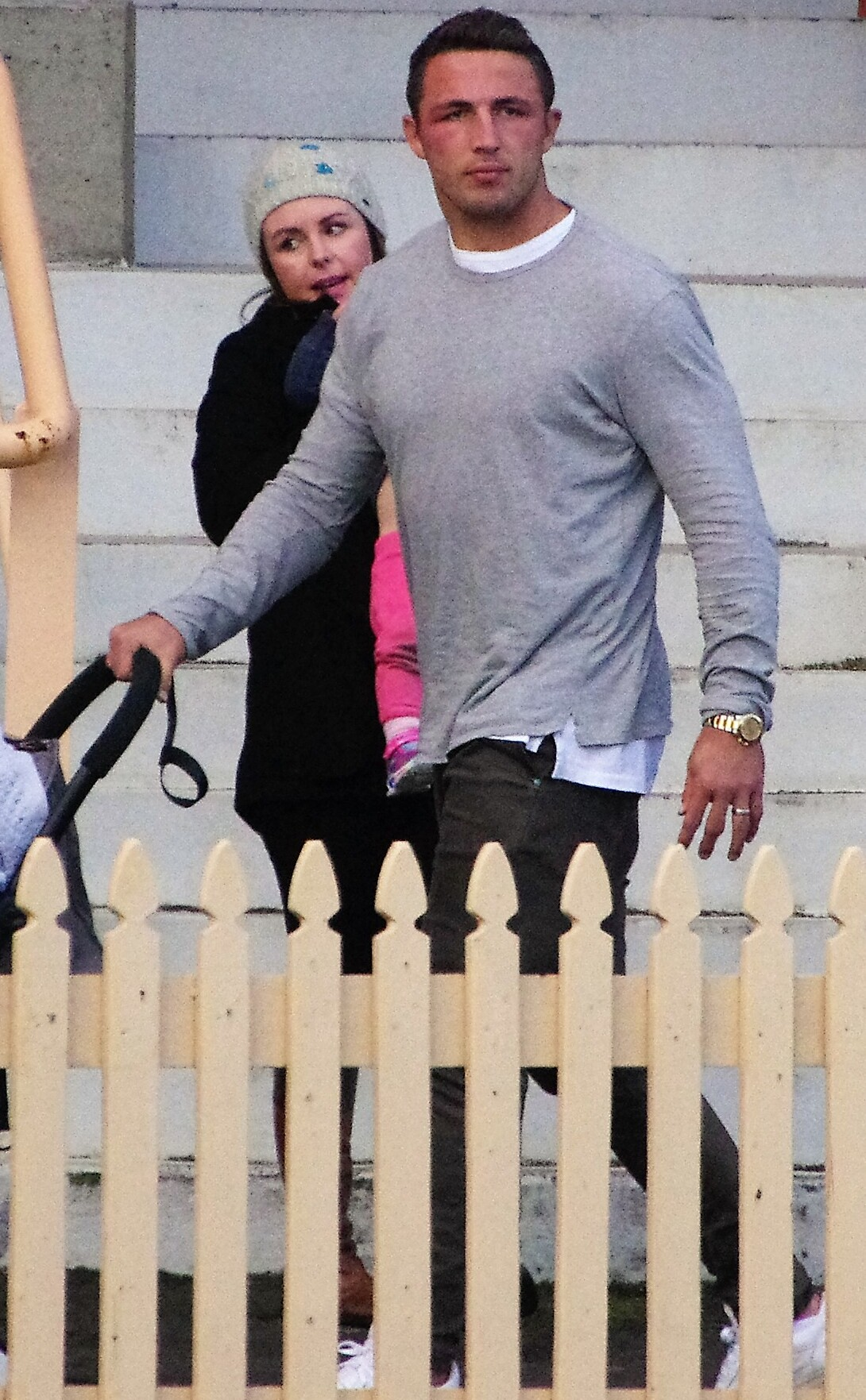

Personal information
- Full name: Samuel Burgess
- Born: 14 December 1988 (age 37) Dewsbury, West Yorkshire, England
- Height: 6 ft 5 in (1.96 m)
- Weight: 18 st 4 lb (116 kg)

Playing information
- Position: Loose forward, Prop, Second-row
Club
Years	Team	Pld	T	G	FG	P
2006–09	Bradford Bulls	88	17	5	0	78
2010–14	South Sydney	96	26	0	0	104
2016–19	South Sydney	86	18	0	0	72
	Total	270	61	5	0	254
Representative
Years	Team	Pld	T	G	FG	P
2007	Great Britain	2	1	0	0	4
2008–19	England	24	8	0	0	32
2010–19	NRL All Stars	1	0	0	0	0

Coaching information
Club
Years	Team	Gms	W	D	L	W%
2024–	Warrington Wolves	99	63	0	36	64
- Source: As of 20 November 2026

Rugby union career
- Position(s): Centre, Back row
Senior career
Years	Team	Apps	(Points)
2014–15	Bath	21	(20)
International career
Years	Team	Apps	(Points)
2015	England Saxons	1	(0)
2015	England	5	(5)
- Education: Heckmondwike Grammar School
- Relatives: Luke Burgess (brother); Tom Burgess (brother); George Burgess (brother)

Samuel Burgess (born 14 December 1988) is an English professional rugby league coach who is the head coach of the Warrington Wolves in the Super League. He is a former professional rugby league and rugby union footballer.

Nicknamed "Slammin' Sam", Burgess played as a loose forward, prop or second-row forward in the 2000s and 2010s, for the Bradford Bulls in the Super League and in Australia for the South Sydney Rabbitohs in the NRL. The Rabbitohs won the 2014 NRL Premiership, the club's first in 43 years, and Burgess was named winner of the Clive Churchill Medal for man of the match in the Grand Final. At international level, he won 2 caps for Great Britain and 24 for England.

In late 2014, Burgess switched codes to play rugby union for Bath. He was called up to the England national team in August 2015, becoming a dual-code international. He won 5 caps, playing as a centre, and was a member of England's squad for their unsuccessful 2015 World Cup campaign.

He returned to rugby league for the 2016 NRL season. On 30 October 2019, Burgess announced his retirement due to a shoulder injury.

== Early life and family ==
Burgess was born on 14 December 1988 in Liversedge, Kirklees, West Yorkshire, England. His late father, Mark Burgess, who died of motor neurone disease, was also a rugby league player who played for Nottingham City, Rochdale Hornets, Dewsbury and Hunslet; while his mother, Julie, is a teacher, currently employed at The Scots College in Bellevue Hill, Sydney.

He is one of four rugby league-playing brothers; his younger twin brothers Tom and George played for the Rabbitohs, retiring at the end of 2024 and 2022 respectively, while older brother Luke retired after playing in England and Australia.

He attended Heckmondwike Grammar School. He played his junior rugby for Hunslet Parkside, Dewsbury Moor and also played for Liversedge Cricket Club.

== Rugby league ==
=== Bradford Bulls ===
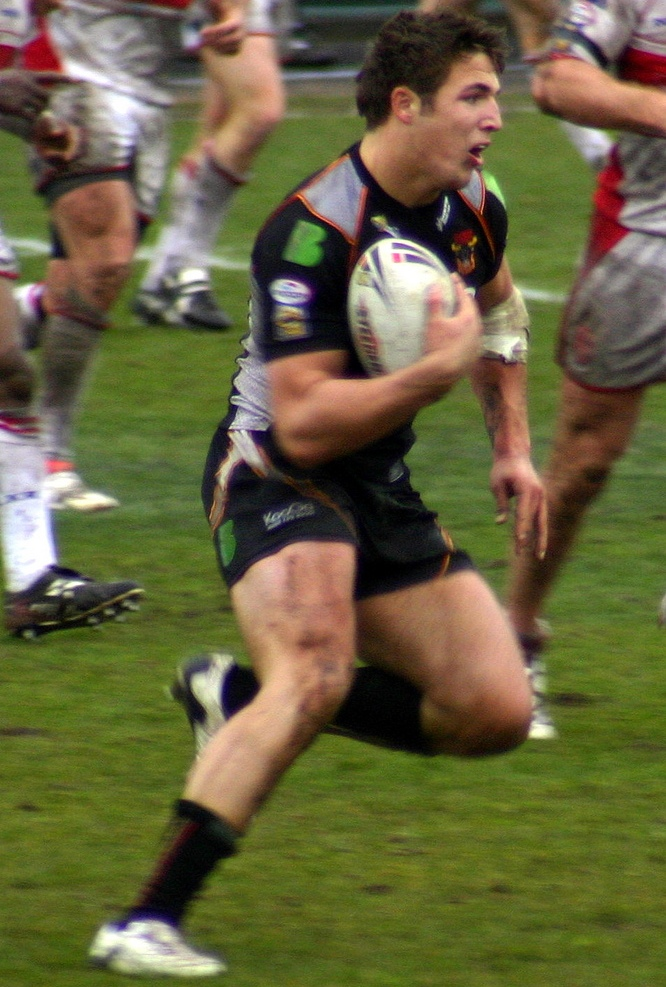
Burgess playing for the Bradford Bulls in 2008

Burgess made his Super League début against Leeds in 2006 after already being dubbed by Shontayne Hape as "Great Britain's Sonny Bill". After a highly successful début season with the Bulls, Burgess was awarded the Senior Academy Player of the Year Award by the club. In 2007 Burgess established himself as a first team regular. After a great full season he was called up for the Great Britain squad for the 2007 Test series with New Zealand, and was named as young player of the year in the Super League. Burgess made his Great Britain début against New Zealand in the 1st test in October 2007, scoring a try. Burgess also played in the centenary match between the All Golds and Northern Union; he was awarded the Man of the match. He gained attention for his big hit on New Zealand prop Fuifui Moimoi during the Kiwis' 2007 tour when he was only 19 years old.

At the end of 2008's Super League XIII, Burgess was forced to rule himself out contention for the England 2008 World Cup squad because of injury.

In September 2009, the South Sydney Rabbitohs announced they had signed Burgess on a four-year deal from the 2010 season. Burgess, on contract at the Bradford Bulls until the end of the 2010 season, was released after the clubs agreed on a compensation fee. South Sydney co-owner and A-list celebrity Russell Crowe persuaded Burgess to choose his club over others that were competing for his signature, after inviting Burgess and his mother to the set of Robin Hood, which he was filming in England at the time.

Burgess, in his last game in the UK before moving to the NRL, played a prominent role in the final of the 2009 Four Nations tournament, scoring two tries in England's defeat by Australia.

=== South Sydney ===
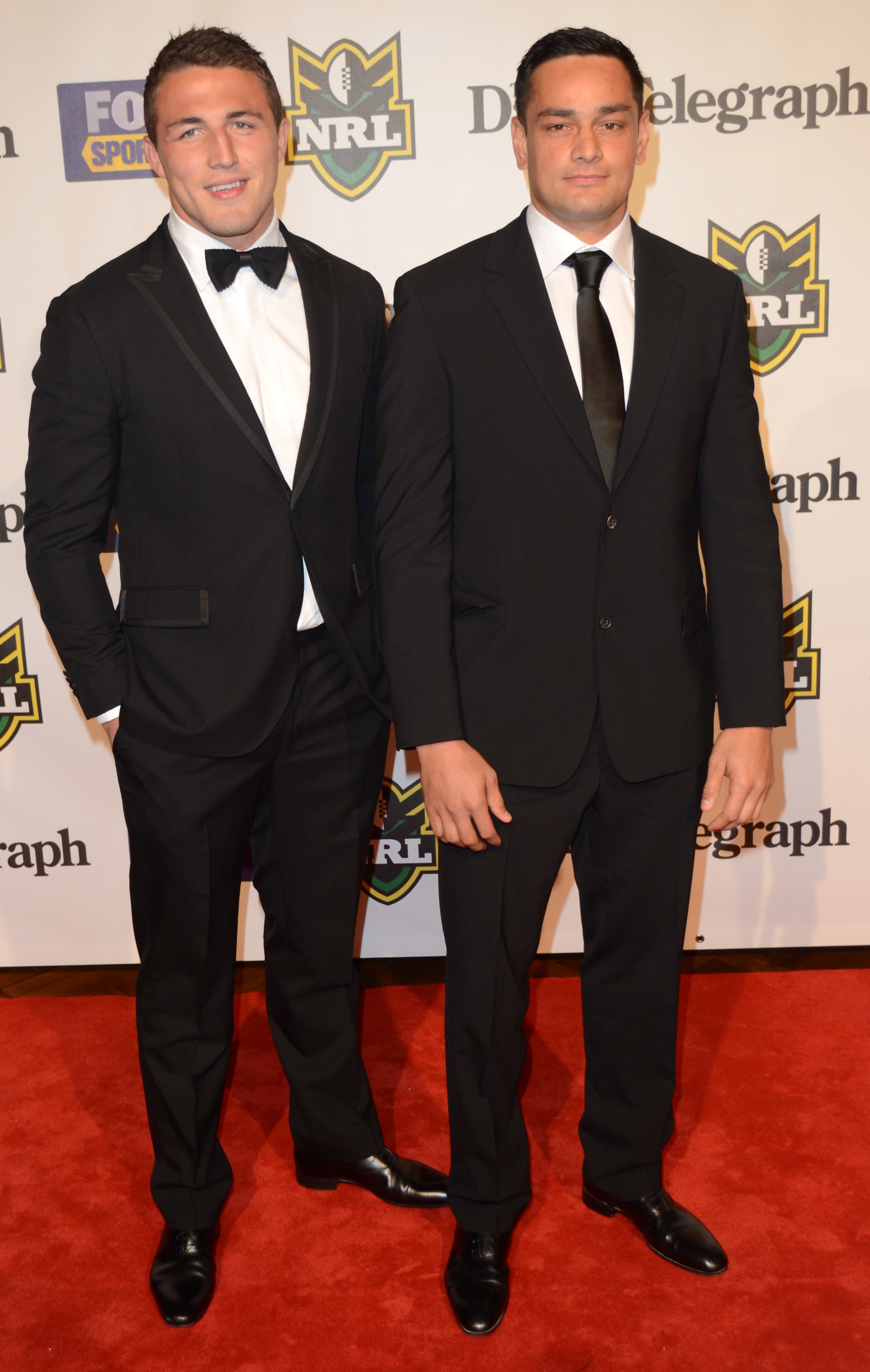
Burgess, with teammate John Sutton in 2012.

Before he had played a game for South Sydney Burgess played prop for the NRL All Stars in the inaugural All Stars match after Rabbitohs prop Dave Taylor injured his ankle at training. It was played at Skilled Park on the Gold Coast on 13 February 2010. The NRL All Stars lost the game 16–12.

He was selected to play for England against France in the one-off test in 2010.

Burgess was given a one-week ban by the NRL Judiciary for a grade one grapple tackle. He was placed on report during Round 21, against the Canterbury Bulldogs, for a grapple tackle made on Canterbury fullback Ben Barba. Burgess therefore missed the Round 22 clash against Wests Tigers. This suspension came at a fairly pivotal time in the season, as forwards Michael Crocker, Luke Stuart, Scott Geddes, and Dave Taylor had all been ruled out from the clash already.

Burgess continued to represent England at the end of the season in the 2010 Four Nations tournament. His shoulder was injured in the first game of the 2011 NRL season against the Roosters on 11 March, for which he needed surgery and a month of rest. However, as soon as he came back from that, he injured his ankle and is out for the remainder of 2011.

In August 2013, the Burgess brothers became the first set of four brothers to line up in the same Australian side since Ray, Roy, Rex and Bernard Norman played for Sydney's Annandale club during the 1910 NSWRFL season. That year, Burgess was banned for two games following his infamous "squirrel grip" on Will Chambers – where Chambers's testicles were grabbed during a game. Sam was in a DVD about his life called 'Slammin' Sam: The Sam Burgess Story'

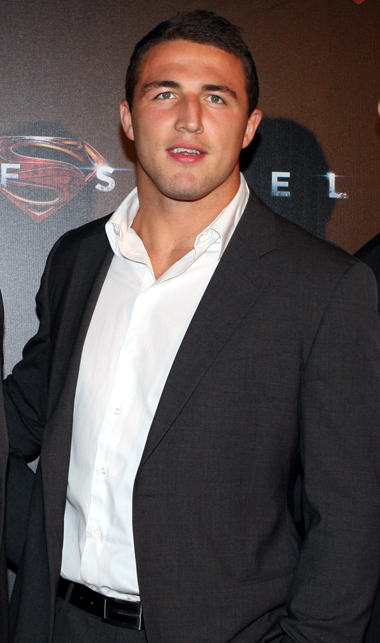
Burgess in 2013

After the 2013 NRL season Burgess represented England in the 2013 World Cup.

On 17 February 2014, it was announced that at the end of the year, Burgess would switch to rugby union. In what was his last match for South Sydney, Burgess, along with brothers Tom and George played against the Canterbury-Bankstown Bulldogs in the 2014 NRL Grand Final. Despite suffering a broken cheekbone in the first tackle of the game, Burgess continued to play on, with his team winning the match. He was awarded the Clive Churchill Medal for best player in the grand final. Taking into account the retrospective Clive Churchill medal awarded to Ron Coote in 1971, Sam Burgess was the first South Sydney player to claim the medal in 43 years.

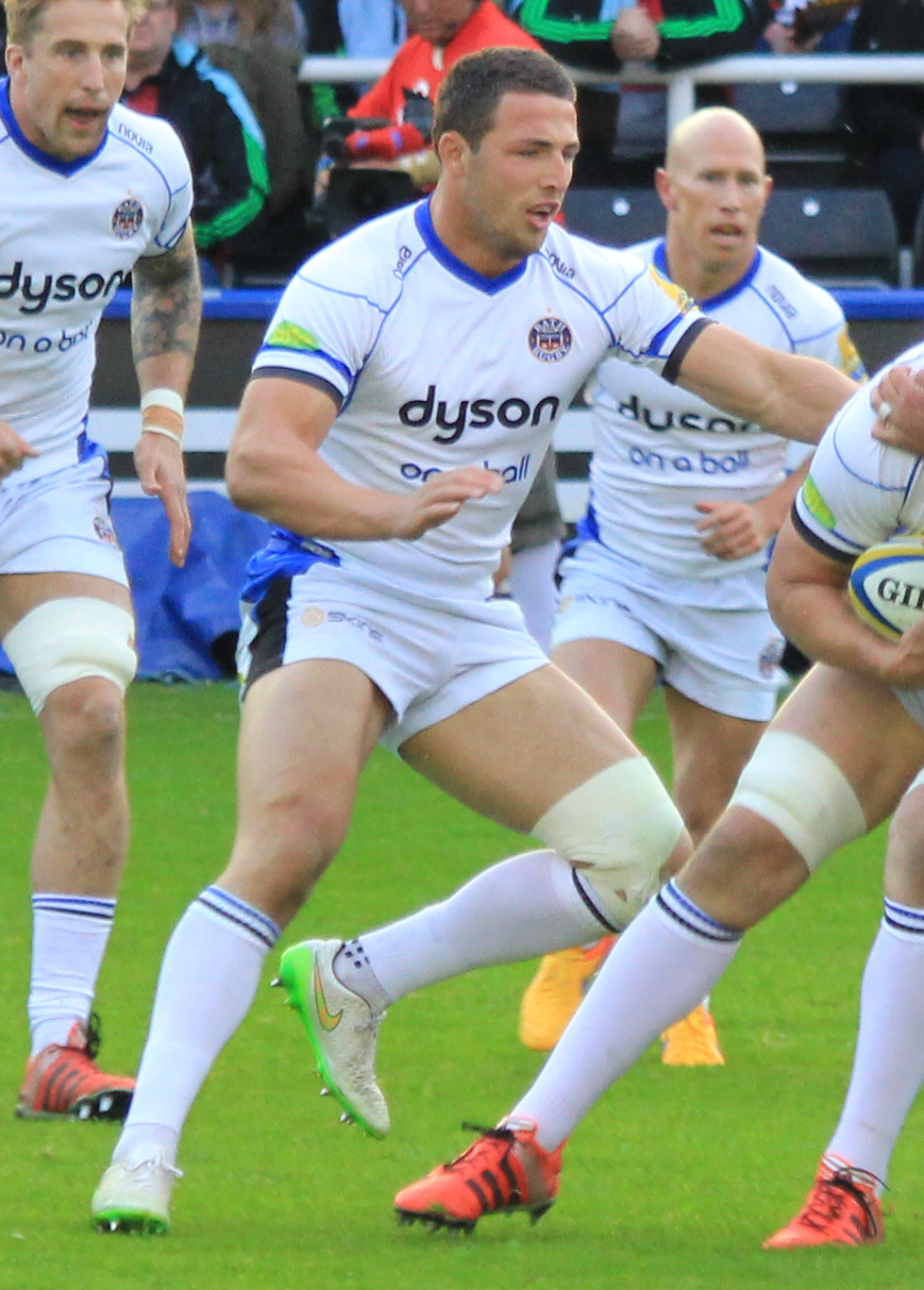
Burgess in 2015 playing for Bath Rugby

== Rugby union ==
Burgess was signed for Bath Rugby in England's top competition on a three-year contract, starting from October 2014. His start date was then delayed until December 2014 due to complicated surgery to fix a fractured cheek and eye socket. He was seen by the English rugby union as their answer to Sonny Bill Williams – a big ball-playing rugby league forward who can transfer those skills to the backline midfield in union.

He scored his first try for Bath in the 13th round of the Premiership against Wasps at the Recreation ground and was awarded man of the match. On 21 January, he was named in the England Saxons squad to play the Irish Wolfhounds. On 10 April, Burgess started in the Aviva Premiership against Newcastle Falcons at blindside flanker. Burgess completed the most turnovers of any player in the matches of that round.

On 10 August, Burgess was named in the England Elite Squad to make his International début against France at Twickenham on 15 August, in a warm-up match for the Rugby World Cup. He started the game which England won 19–14. Following his appearance where he was sin-binned, World Cup winning English scrum half Matt Dawson commented: "You can't take him to the World Cup for me. He played 80 mins and credit for that. But the way the game went in the second half there was nothing for him to do. The great thing about Burgess is he doesn't make mistakes with ball in hand. But unfortunately, if you're going to be really picky, positionally he wasn't great. He played like a six rather than a 12. There are things that are instinctively he doesn't know what to do." Dawson's comments came before Lancaster named Burgess as one of four centres including Henry Slade to represent England in the World Cup. His inclusion and performances at the World Cup were widely scrutinized, and seen by some pundits as partly to blame for England's "humiliating" early pool stage exit from the tournament—the worst result for a host nation since 1991. Burgess in 2018 claimed ""If people actually re-watched the games I participated in you will see I added to the team. What cost us an early exit was individual egos and selfish players not following our leader." England led Wales 25-18 when Burgess was substituted in the 70th minute in his final game for England.

On 5 November, Burgess made the decision to leave rugby union, opting to return to South Sydney Rabbitohs, signing a three-year contract.

== Rugby league return ==
In early November 2015 it was reported that Burgess had been signed to the South Sydney Rabbitohs for $1.5m AUD per season. This figure would make him the highest paid rugby league footballer of all time and in the top three highest paid of either code. In December 2015 Burgess was selected to play for the World All Stars in the 2016 Rugby League All Stars Match alongside his brother Tom Burgess.

In October 2016, Burgess was named in the 24-man England squad for the 2016 Four Nations tournament.

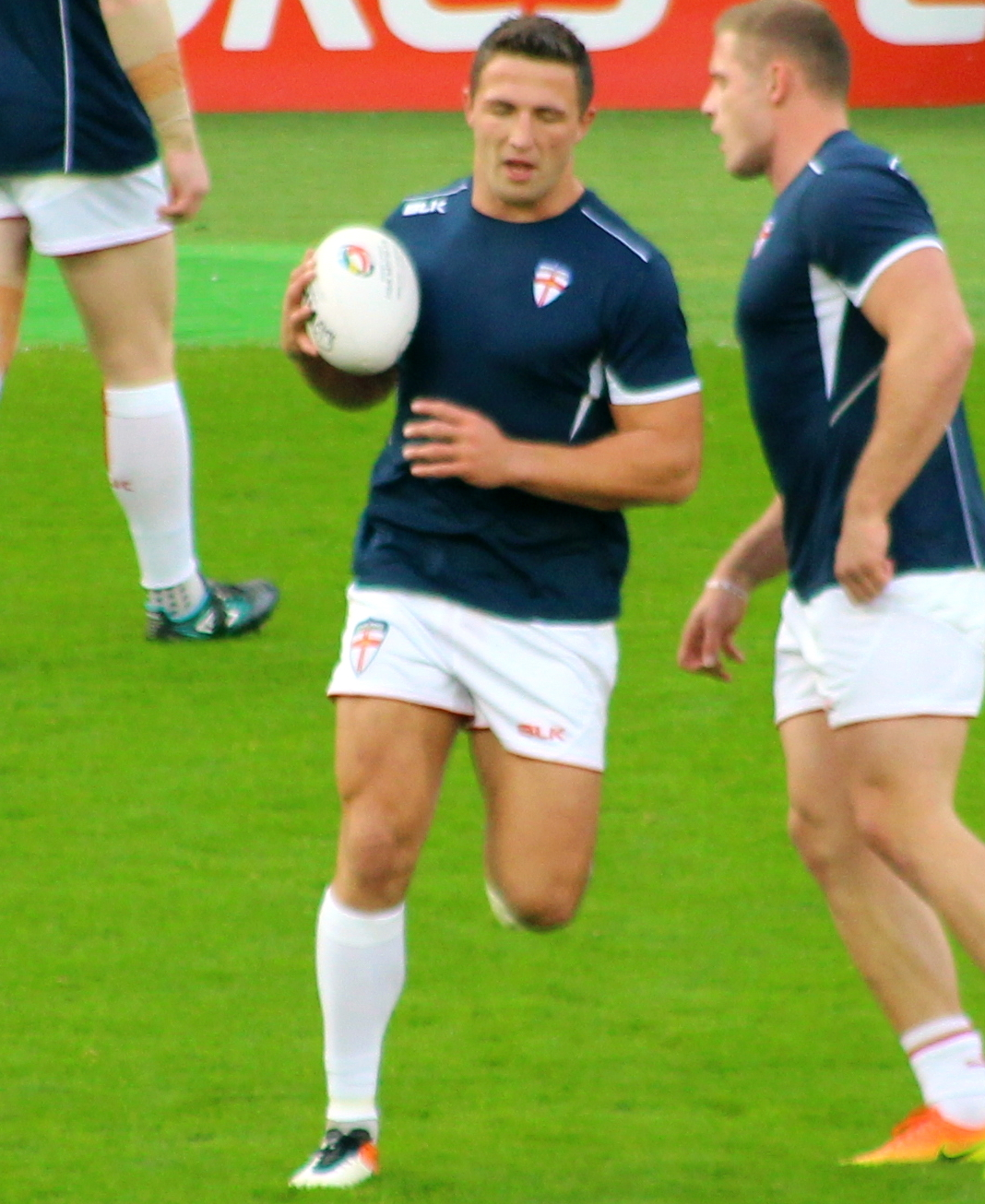
Burgess warming up for England in 2016

He was also announced the new captain under new coach Wayne Bennett after original captain Sean O'Loughlin was unavailable through injury.

In October 2017 he was selected in the England squad for the 2017 Rugby League World Cup. In the week leading up to the final, Burgess was made captain as Sean O'Loughlin pulled out with injury. England went on to lose the final to Australia 6–0. On 6 December 2017, it was announced that Burgess had agreed to a contract extension with Souths keeping him at the club until the end of 2019.

On 5 September 2018 Burgess signed a four-year contract with Souths keeping him at the club until the end of the 2023 season. The new contract deal coincided with Souths returning to form in The NRL with the club finishing third on the table at the end of the regular season. The following week, Burgess and South Sydney were embroiled in an off field incident involving Souths players exposing themselves on Instagram to a female fan back in May 2018. A report by The Daily Telegraph verified social media accounts belonging to Burgess were at the centre of the saga. On 21 September 2018, Burgess was cleared by the NRL of any wrongdoing. Burgess then spoke to the media saying "I have not sexted anyone, I fully co-operated with the inquiry as I said I would. I have engaged lawyer Chris Murphy to pursue my remedies and he has retained defamation lawyers".

Burgess started the 2019 NRL season strongly as Souths won 10 of their first 11 games. Following Souths Round 13 loss against Newcastle, Burgess was ruled out with a shoulder injury. It was later revealed that Burgess needed a drip inserted into his heart to fight an infection after shoulder surgery and was ruled out from playing indefinitely.

Burgess returned to the Souths side for their Round 20 match against Cronulla which Souths lost 39–24 at Shark Park. Burgess was placed on report during the match after hitting Cronulla player Matt Moylan with a high tackle.

On 21 August 2019 Burgess was voted as one of the best players of the decade in the NRL team of the decade announcement which spanned from the 2010 to 2019 seasons. The panel which voted was made up of Premiership-winning coaches Phil Gould, Craig Bellamy, Trent Robinson and Ricky Stuart along with Hall of Famers Peter Sterling, Darren Lockyer, Danny Buderus and Laurie Daley.

In round 25 of the 2019 NRL season, Burgess was replaced on report in South Sydney's victory over arch rivals the Sydney Roosters. Burgess was alleged to have pulled the hair of Easts player Billy Smith. Burgess was later suspended for one match over the incident.

On 18 September 2019, Burgess was asked by NRL CEO Todd Greenberg to meet with him and show cause as to why he should not be reprimanded for an outburst he made about criticism in relation to the NRL judiciary. In an interview with the media Burgess said "Everyone seems to be in uproar about this judiciary system, "Who is making the calls here? Is there a discussion before these calls go out there? I don't know. What's the process? It's like a kangaroo court in there".

At the end of the 2019 regular season, South Sydney finished in third place on the table and qualified for the finals. Burgess missed the qualifying final against the Sydney Roosters due to his suspension in round 25. Burgess returned for the elimination semi-final against Manly-Warringah which Souths won 34–26 at ANZ Stadium. The following week, Burgess played in South Sydney's 16-10 preliminary final loss against Canberra at Canberra Stadium.

On 30 October 2019, Burgess was forced into early retirement due to a chronic shoulder injury. Burgess released a statement saying "To all South Sydney members and fans, fans of the game and even the supporters that aren't my biggest fans, I'd like to thank each and every one of you for making my career what it was in the NRL, I have loved absolutely every minute; the highs, the lows; the Grand Final; coming home; my injuries; my dates with the judiciary. It really has been a fantastic ride".

== Playing statistics ==
Year	Team	Games	Tries	Goals	Pts
2006	Bradford Bulls	9	2		12
2007	Bradford Bulls	30	3	5	22
2008	Bradford Bulls	23	8		32
2009	Bradford Bulls	26	4		16
2010	South Sydney	22	3		12
2011	South Sydney	4			
2012	South Sydney	22	5		20
2013	South Sydney	22	8		32
2014	South Sydney	26	10		40
2016	South Sydney	23	5		20
2017	South Sydney	21	5		20
2018	South Sydney	23	1		4
2019	South Sydney	19	7		28
	Totals	270	61	5	254

== Coaching career ==
On 7 August 2023, Burgess signed a two-year contract to become Warrington's new head coach ahead of the 2024 Super League season. On 23 August 2023, Burgess was relieved from his duties as South Sydney's assistant head coach. It was reported that Burgess had clashed with head coach Jason Demetriou over training and standards at the club. On 8 June 2024, Burgess coached Warrington in their 2024 Challenge Cup final defeat against Wigan. Burgess guided Warrington to a third-placed finish on the table in his first season at the club. Burgess would take Warrington to the semi-final where they were narrowly defeated by Hull Kingston Rovers. On 7 June 2025, Burgess coached Warrington in their 8-6 Challenge Cup final loss against Hull Kingston Rovers. Warrington had led the match 6–2 with less than two minutes remaining. In a post match interview, Burgess stated "We were the better side, "It's going to be a tough one for the guys to take. I don't have a great deal to say because I was proud of our performance and the end of the game was a bit of a blow for me really." In the 2025 Super League season, Burgess guided Warrington to a disappointing 8th place on the table. The club finished ten points off the playoff places. In the 2026 Super League season, Burgess guided Warrington to the 2026 Super League Grand Final where they lost to Wakefield Trinity.

== Coaching statistics ==
=== League and Cup games ===
Team	From	To	M	W	D	L	PF	PA	Win%	Honours
Warrington Wolves	7 August 2023		18	12	0	6	461	231	66.67	

=== Hall of Fame ===
In August 2024, the National Rugby League announced that Burgess was an inductee into the National Rugby League Hall of Fame. Burgess, who was ascribed Hall of Fame number 126, was amongst eleven male players in the 2024 Class.

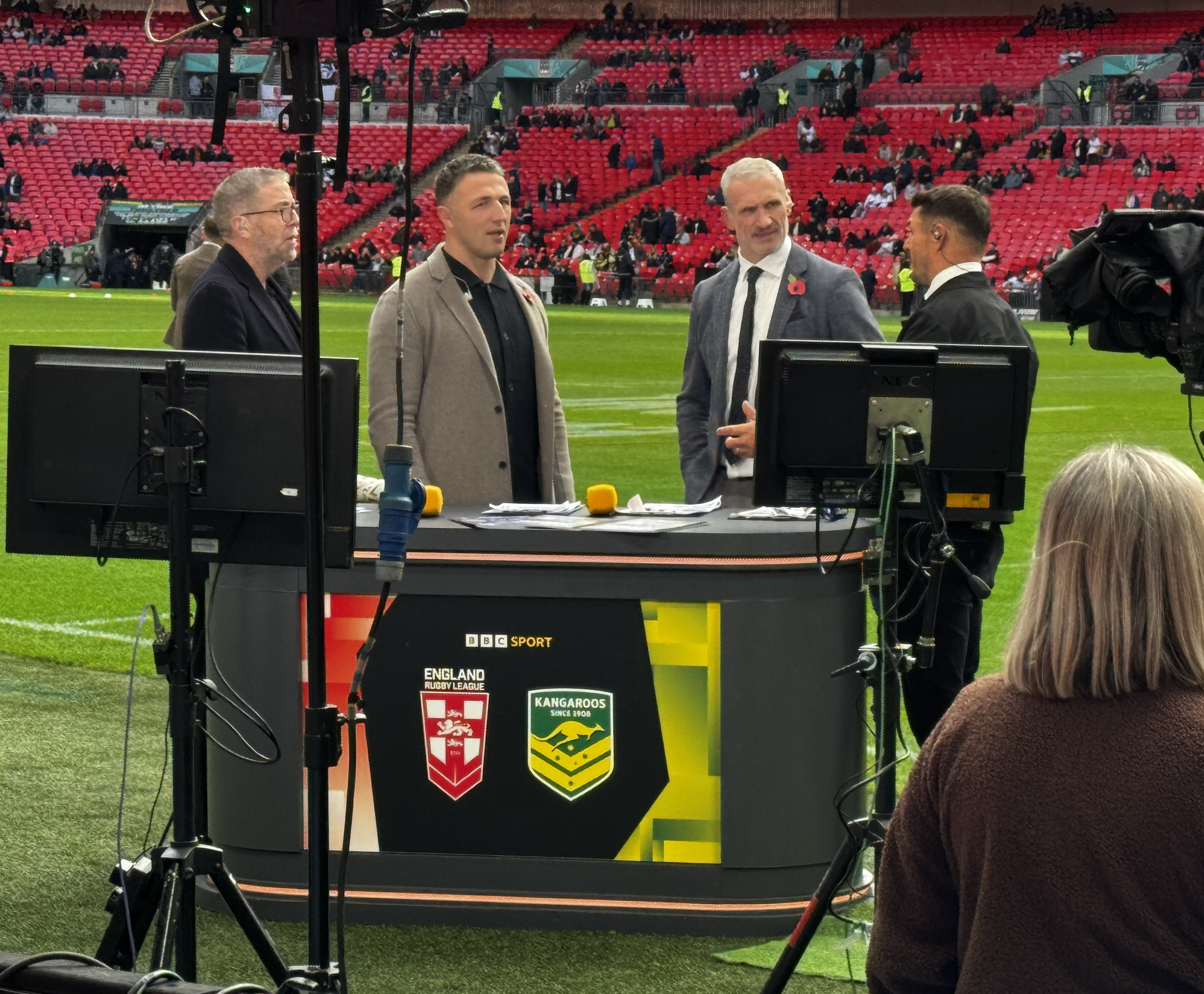
Mark Chapman, Burgess, Jamie Peacock and Jon Wilkin with the BBC at Wembley Stadium in 2025

== Honours ==
=== Rugby league ===
- NRL Winner: 2014
- Clive Churchill Medal Winner: 2014
- George Piggins Medal Winner: 2014
- Jack Rayner Players' Player Award Winner: 2014
- Bob McCarthy Clubman of the Year Award Winner: 2014
- Burrow Appreciation Award Winner: 2014
- 2019: NRL team of the decade member 2010–2019.
- National Rugby League Hall of Fame inductee: #126 2024

=== Rugby union ===
Aviva Premiership Runner-up: 2014/15

== Personal life ==
In December 2015, Burgess married Phoebe Hooke in New South Wales. The couple had a son and daughter together and separated in 2019. They reconciled some time in April 2019 but split for a second time in October 2019.

Shortly after their separation, an apprehended violence order (AVO) was taken out against Burgess on behalf of his father-in-law, Mitchell Hooke. Burgess later pleaded not guilty to charges of intimidation and common assault and claimed the allegations made by his ex-wife were "born out of malice or retaliation". On 5 February 2021, Burgess was found guilty of intimidating his former father-in-law, Mitchell Hooke. On 19 March 2021, Burgess had his conviction for intimidating his former father-in-law overturned on appeal. On 20 October 2021, Burgess was cleared of all charges against him, with a statement reading "NSW Police Operational Legal Advice unit just recommended no criminal prosecution(s) be preferred against Sam Burgess in relation to these allegations. That now concludes this investigation."

On 22 February 2021, Burgess was arrested by police and charged with driving offences which included driving an unregistered vehicle and driving without a valid licence. Burgess also failed a random roadside drug test. Burgess was later ordered to appear in court on 4 May 2021.

In October 2024, Burgess married Lucy Graham in Rome. Following their marriage, they settled in Cheshire, England, and have a daughter together.
