= Houldsworth baronets =

Set index for Houldsworth baronets

There have been two baronetcies created for persons with the surname Houldsworth, both in the Baronetage of the United Kingdom. As of 2026 one creation is extant.

- Houldsworth baronets of Reddish and Coodham (1887)
- Houldsworth baronets of Heckmondwike (1956)
