= Castle Hall Academy =

Location
- Richard Thorpe Avenue; Mirfield, West Yorkshire, WF14 9PH; England
- Coordinates: 53.68005°N 1.68870°W

Information
- Type: Academy
- Established: 1903
- Local authority: Kirklees
- Trust: Impact Education Multi Academy Trust
- Department for Education URN: 146367 Tables
- Ofsted: Reports
- Head teacher: Paul Brook
- Age: 11 to 16
- Website: http://www.castlehall.com/

Castle Hall Academy (formerly Castle Hall School before becoming an academy in 2011, and Castle Hall Academy before and after joining IMPACT in 2018) is a mixed 11–16 Academy in Mirfield, West Yorkshire, England. The school has been awarded specialist Language College status. 174 pupils at age 11 are taken in annually. Preference is given to those who live within the catchment area.

== Possible school closure plans overturned in January 2010 ==
In September 2008, the local authority decided on a plan to overhaul education in North Kirklees. This plan would see the permanent closure of the school and the remainder of its pupils merging with pupils at the Mirfield Free Grammar.

An action group made up of parents and local residents calling itself R.E.A.C.H. (Retain Education at Castle Hall) was quickly formed to campaign against the controversial proposal. Groups dedicated to saving the school also exist on the social networking sites Facebook and Twitter. At a meeting in Dewsbury Town Hall on 1 April 2009, the decision to close was delayed and referred back to Kirklees Council's Cabinet for review.

On 19 June 2009 Kirklees Council are expected to publish the statutory notice of closure for Castle Hall and the statutory notice of proposal (planning) for the expansion of Mirfield Free Grammar School. Protesters have planned a large public demonstration to take place around the school on that date.

These plans were overturned on 12 January 2010 by Schools Adjudicator, Canon Richard Lindley. The school is no longer due to close.

The GCSE results of 2009 were the best in the school's recent history with 73% of pupils achieving at least 5 A*-C. This ranked Castle Hall as the best non-selective state school in Kirklees.

The school is a popular and oversubscribed academy.
