= 2017 NRL season =

110th season of professional rugby league in Australia

2017 National Rugby League
- Duration: March 2 – October 1, 2017
- Teams: 16
- Premiers: Melbourne Storm (3rd title)
- Minor premiers: Melbourne Storm (3rd title)
- Matches played: 201
- Points scored: 8,073
- Average attendance: 15,246
- Attendance: 3,018,795
- Top points scorer(s): Nathan Cleary (228)
- Wooden spoon: Newcastle Knights (4th spoon)
- Dally M Medal: Cameron Smith
- Top try-scorer(s): Suliasi Vunivalu & Josh Addo-Carr (23)

The 2017 NRL season was the 110th season of professional rugby league in Australia and the 20th season run by the National Rugby League. The season started in New Zealand with the annual Auckland Nines, and was followed by the All Stars Match, which was played at McDonald Jones Stadium in Newcastle, and the World Club Series. It marked the last time that the Anzac Test and City vs. Country representative matches were played.

== Teams ==
The lineup of teams remained unchanged for the 11th consecutive year.

Colours	Club	Season	Home ground(s)	Head coach	Captain(s)
	Brisbane Broncos	30th season	Suncorp Stadium	Wayne Bennett	Darius Boyd
	Canberra Raiders	36th season	GIO Stadium Canberra	Ricky Stuart	Jarrod Croker
	Canterbury-Bankstown Bulldogs	83rd season	ANZ Stadium & Belmore Sports Ground	Des Hasler	James Graham
	Cronulla-Sutherland Sharks	51st season	Southern Cross Group Stadium	Shane Flanagan	Paul Gallen
	Gold Coast Titans	11th season	Cbus Super Stadium	Neil Henry→Terry Matterson (interim)	Ryan James & Kevin Proctor
	Manly Warringah Sea Eagles	68th season	Lottoland	Trent Barrett	Daly Cherry-Evans
	Melbourne Storm	20th season	AAMI Park	Craig Bellamy	Cameron Smith
	Newcastle Knights	30th season	McDonald Jones Stadium	Nathan Brown	Trent Hodkinson
	New Zealand Warriors	23rd season	Mt. Smart Stadium	Stephen Kearney	Roger Tuivasa-Sheck
	North Queensland Cowboys	23rd season	1300SMILES Stadium	Paul Green	Johnathan Thurston & Matt Scott
	Parramatta Eels	71st season	ANZ Stadium	Brad Arthur	Tim Mannah & Beau Scott
	Penrith Panthers	51st season	Pepper Stadium	Anthony Griffin	Matt Moylan
	South Sydney Rabbitohs	108th season	ANZ Stadium	Michael Maguire	Greg Inglis→Sam Burgess
	St. George Illawarra Dragons	19th season	UOW Jubilee Oval & WIN Stadium	Paul McGregor	Gareth Widdop
	Sydney Roosters	110th season	Allianz Stadium	Trent Robinson	Jake Friend & Boyd Cordner
	Wests Tigers	18th season	Leichhardt Oval & Campbelltown Stadium & ANZ Stadium	~~Jason Taylor~~→Andrew Webster (interim)→Ivan Cleary	Aaron Woods

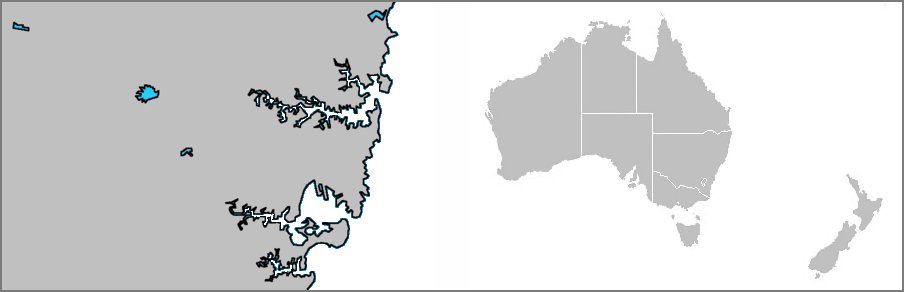
Locations of the participating clubs

== Pre-season ==
The 2017 pre-season featured the fourth edition of the Auckland Nines competition, held over a weekend at Auckland's Eden Park in which the Sydney Roosters defeated the Penrith Panthers in the final. The All Stars match was held on February 10 at McDonald Jones Stadium in Newcastle. The 2017 World Club Series took place in England with the Super League champions Wigan Warriors defeating the NRL premiers Cronulla-Sutherland Sharks in the World Club Challenge match.

== Regular season ==
Team	1	2	3	4	5	6	7	8	9	10	11	12	13	14	15	16	17	18	19	20	21	22	23	24	25	26	F1	F2	F3	GF
Brisbane Broncos	**CRO**; **8**	NQL; 1*	**MEL**; **2**	CAN; 1	**CBY**; **3**	SYD; 24	GCT; 2	**SOU**; **1**	PEN; 14	**MAN**; 10	WTI; 36	**NZL**; **18**	**SYD**; **2**	SOU; 6	X	**CAN**; **10**	MEL; 30	X	**NEW**; **12**	CBY; 30	**PAR**; **14**	**GCT**; **54**	CRO; 22	SGI; 12	PAR; 18	**NQL**; **10**	**SYD**; **2**	PEN; 7	**MEL**; **30**	
Canberra Raiders	**NQL**; **4***	CRO; 26	WTI; 40	**BRI**; **1**	PAR; 12	**GCT**; **26**	NZL; 12	MAN; 2*	**CBY**; **6**	**NEW**; **14**	**PAR**; **6**	SYD; 8	**MAN**; **1***	**PEN**; **4**	X	BRI; 10	NQL; 13	X	SGI; 4*	MEL; 6	**SOU**; **14**	**CRO**; **18**	**NZL**; **20**	PEN; 4	NEW; 18	**MEL**; **26**				
Canterbury-Bankstown Bulldogs	MEL; 6	**SYD**; **4**	**NZL**; **12**	**MAN**; **36**	BRI; 3	**NEW**; **10**	SOU; 15	WTI; 6	CAN; 6	NQL; 16	SYD; 6	**CRO**; **1**	PEN; 38	SGI; 14	X	**NZL**; **7**	PAR; 1*	NEW; 2	X	**BRI**; **30**	**PEN**; **8**	PAR; 16	SOU; 14	MAN; 14	**GCT**; **12**	SGI; 6				
Cronulla-Sutherland Sharks	BRI; 8	**CAN**; **26**	SGI; 6	**PAR**; **14**	NEW; 1	**MEL**; **9**	**PEN**; **26**	GCT; 4	**WTI**; **6**	**SGI**; **4**	NQL; 4	CBY; 1	X	MEL; 5	WTI; 2	MAN; 17	**SYD**; **32**	X	**GCT**; **20**	SOU; 14	**NZL**; **14**	CAN; 18	**BRI**; **22**	**NQL**; **10**	SYD; 2	**NEW**; **8**	NQL; 1*			
Gold Coast Titans	SYD; 14	**NEW**; **8**	PAR; 12	NQL; 6	**NZL**; **6**	CAN; 26	**BRI**; **2**	**CRO**; **4**	NEW; 30	**MEL**; **2**	MAN; 20	X	**NQL**; **12**	NZL; 22	**SOU**; **16**	**WTI**; **12**	SGI; 10	X	CRO; 20	**PEN**; **8**	WTI; 22	BRI; 54	**SGI**; **26**	**PAR**; **22**	CBY; 12	**SYD**; **4**				
Manly Warringah Sea Eagles	PAR; 8	SOU; 20	**NQL**; **22**	CBY; 36	**SYD**; **6**	SGI; 25	MEL; 4	**CAN**; **2***	**SOU**; **38**	BRI; 10	**GCT**; **20**	X	CAN; 1*	NEW; 4	X	**CRO**; **17**	NZL; 4	**PEN**; **8**	WTI; 12	**SGI**; **30**	**MEL**; **34**	SYD; 18	**WTI**; **4**	**CBY**; **14**	**NZL**; **1***	PEN; 16	PEN; 12			
Melbourne Storm	**CBY**; **6**	**NZL**; **16**	BRI; 2	**WTI**; **8**	PEN; 22	CRO; 9	**MAN**; **4**	NZL; 6	**SGI**; **12**	GCT; 2	**SOU**; **8**	X	NEW; 28	**CRO**; **5**	NQL; 1*	**SYD**; **1***	**BRI**; **30**	PAR; 16	X	**CAN**; **6**	MAN; 34	**NQL**; **18**	SYD; 3	**NEW**; **32**	SOU; 58	CAN; 26	PAR; 2	X	BRI; 30	NQL; 28
Newcastle Knights	**NZL**; **4**	GCT; 8	SOU; 6	**PEN**; **40**	**CRO**; **1**	CBY; 10	SYD; 18	**NQL**; **12**	**GCT**; **30**	CAN; 14	PEN; 10	X	**MEL**; **28**	**MAN**; **4**	X	**SGI**; **4**	WTI; 21	**CBY**; **2**	BRI; 12	**SYD**; **24**	SGI; 7	NZL; 16	**PAR**; **19**	MEL; 32	**CAN**; **18**	CRO; 8				
New Zealand Warriors	NEW; 4	MEL; 16	CBY; 12	**SGI**; **14**	GCT; 6	PAR; 12	**CAN**; **12**	**MEL**; **6**	SYD; 1	**PEN**; **8**	SGI; 16	BRI; 18	**PAR**; **8**	**GCT**; **22**	X	CBY; 7	**MAN**; **4**	X	PEN; 12	**NQL**; **12**	CRO; 14	**NEW**; **16**	CAN; 20	**SOU**; **18**	MAN; 1*	**WTI**; **12**				
North Queensland Cowboys	CAN; 4*	**BRI**; **1***	MAN; 22	**GCT**; **6**	SOU; 14	WTI; 10	**SGI**; **6**	NEW; 12	PAR; 20	**CBY**; **16**	**CRO**; **4**	X	GCT; 12	PAR; 26	**MEL**; **1***	PEN; 2	**CAN**; **13**	X	SOU; 13	NZL; 12	**SYD**; **6**	MEL; 18	**PEN**; **8**	CRO; 10	**WTI**; **8**	BRI; 10	**CRO**; **1***	**PAR**; **8**	**SYD**; **14**	**MEL**; **28**
Parramatta Eels	**MAN**; **8**	**SGI**; **18**	**GCT**; **12**	CRO; 14	**CAN**; **12**	**NZL**; **12**	**WTI**; **4**	PEN; 6	**NQL**; **20**	**SYD**; **38**	CAN; 6	**SOU**; **6**	NZL; 8	**NQL**; **26**	SGI; 14	X	**CBY**; **1***	**MEL**; **16**	X	**WTI**; **1**	BRI; 14	**CBY**; **16**	NEW; 19	GCT; 22	**BRI**; **18**	**SOU**; **6**	**MEL**; **2**	NQL; 8		
Penrith Panthers	**SGI**; **32**	**WTI**; **34**	SYD; 2	NEW; 40	**MEL**; **22**	SOU; 1	CRO; 26	**PAR**; **6**	**BRI**; **14**	NZL; 8	**NEW**; **10**	X	**CBY**; **38**	CAN; 4	X	**NQL**; **2**	**SOU**; **28**	MAN; 8	**NZL**; **12**	GCT; 8	CBY; 8	WTI; 14	NQL; 8	**CAN**; **4**	SGI; 2	**MAN**; **16**	**MAN**; **12**	**BRI**; **7**		
South Sydney Rabbitohs	WTI; 16	**MAN**; **20**	**NEW**; **6**	SYD; 14	**NQL**; **14**	**PEN**; **1**	**CBY**; **15**	BRI; 1	MAN; 38	WTI; 20	MEL; 8	PAR; 6	X	**BRI**; **6**	GCT; 16	X	PEN; 28	**SYD**; **2**	**NQL**; **13**	**CRO**; **14**	CAN; 14	**SGI**; **2**	**CBY**; **14**	NZL; 18	**MEL**; **58**	PAR; 6				
St. George Illawarra Dragons	PEN; 32	PAR; 18	**CRO**; **6**	NZL; 14	**WTI**; **22**	**MAN**; **25**	NQL; 6	**SYD**; **1***	MEL; 12	CRO; 4	**NZL**; **16**	X	**WTI**; **4**	**CBY**; **14**	**PAR**; **14**	NEW; 4	**GCT**; **10**	X	**CAN**; **4***	MAN; 30	**NEW**; **7**	SOU; 2	GCT; 26	**BRI**; **12**	**PEN**; **2**	**CBY**; **6**				
Sydney Roosters	**GCT**; **14**	CBY; 4	**PEN**; **2**	**SOU**; **14**	MAN; 6	**BRI**; **24**	**NEW**; **18**	SGI; 1*	**NZL**; **1**	PAR; 38	**CBY**; **6**	**CAN**; **8**	BRI; 2	**WTI**; **22**	X	MEL; 1*	CRO; 32	SOU; 2	X	NEW; 24	NQL; 6	**MAN**; **18**	**MEL**; **3**	WTI; 4	**CRO**; **2**	GCT; 4	BRI; 2	X	NQL; 14	
Wests Tigers	**SOU**; **16**	PEN; 34	**CAN**; **40**	MEL; 8	SGI; 22	**NQL**; **10**	PAR; 4	**CBY**; **6**	CRO; 6	**SOU**; **20**	**BRI**; **36**	X	SGI; 4	SYD; 22	**CRO**; **2**	GCT; 12	**NEW**; **21**	X	**MAN**; **12**	PAR; 1	**GCT**; **22**	**PEN**; **14**	MAN; 4	**SYD**; **4**	NQL; 8	NZL; 12				
Team	1	2	3	4	5	6	7	8	9	10	11	12	13	14	15	16	17	18	19	20	21	22	23	24	25	26	F1	F2	F3	GF

Bold – Opposition's Home game
X – Bye
* – Golden point game
Opponent for round listed above margin

== Ladder ==
2017 NRL season
Pos	Team	Pld	W	D	L	B	PF	PA	PD	Pts
1	Melbourne Storm (P)	24	20	0	4	2	633	336	+297	44
2	Sydney Roosters	24	17	0	7	2	500	428	+72	38
3	Brisbane Broncos	24	16	0	8	2	597	433	+164	36
4	Parramatta Eels	24	16	0	8	2	496	457	+39	36
5	Cronulla-Sutherland Sharks	24	15	0	9	2	476	407	+69	34
6	Manly-Warringah Sea Eagles	24	14	0	10	2	552	512	+40	32
7	Penrith Panthers	24	13	0	11	2	504	459	+45	30
8	North Queensland Cowboys	24	13	0	11	2	467	443	+24	30
9	St. George Illawarra Dragons	24	12	0	12	2	533	450	+83	28
10	Canberra Raiders	24	11	0	13	2	558	497	+61	26
11	Canterbury-Bankstown Bulldogs	24	10	0	14	2	360	455	−95	24
12	South Sydney Rabbitohs	24	9	0	15	2	464	564	−100	22
13	New Zealand Warriors	24	7	0	17	2	444	575	−131	18
14	Wests Tigers	24	7	0	17	2	413	571	−158	18
15	Gold Coast Titans	24	7	0	17	2	448	638	−190	18
16	Newcastle Knights	24	5	0	19	2	428	648	−220	14

=== Ladder progression ===
- Numbers highlighted in green indicate that the team finished the round inside the top 8.
- Numbers highlighted in blue indicates the team finished first on the ladder in that round.
- Numbers highlighted in red indicates the team finished last place on the ladder in that round.
- Underlined numbers indicate that the team had a bye during that round.

	Team	1	2	3	4	5	6	7	8	9	10	11	12	13	14	15	16	17	18	19	20	21	22	23	24	25	26
1	Melbourne (P)	2	4	6	8	10	10	12	14	16	16	18	20	22	24	26	26	28	28	30	32	34	36	38	40	42	44
2	Sydney	2	4	6	8	8	8	10	12	12	14	16	16	18	20	22	24	24	26	28	30	32	32	32	34	36	38
3	Brisbane	2	2	2	4	4	6	8	10	12	14	16	16	16	18	20	22	22	24	26	28	28	30	32	34	34	36
4	Parramatta	2	4	4	4	4	4	6	8	10	10	10	12	14	14	16	18	20	22	24	26	28	30	30	32	34	36
5	Cronulla-Sutherland	0	2	2	4	6	8	10	10	12	14	16	18	20	20	22	22	24	26	26	28	30	30	30	32	32	34
6	Manly-Warringah	0	0	2	4	6	6	6	8	10	10	12	14	16	18	20	22	24	24	26	26	26	28	28	28	30	32
7	Penrith	0	2	2	4	4	4	4	4	4	6	8	10	12	14	16	16	16	18	20	22	24	26	28	30	30	30
8	North Queensland	2	4	4	6	8	8	8	10	10	12	12	14	16	18	18	20	22	24	26	28	28	28	28	28	30	30
9	St. George Illawarra	2	2	4	6	8	10	12	12	12	12	14	16	18	18	18	20	20	22	22	24	24	24	26	26	28	28
10	Canberra	0	0	2	2	4	6	8	8	8	8	10	12	12	12	14	14	14	16	18	18	20	22	24	24	26	26
11	Canterbury-Bankstown	0	0	2	2	4	6	8	8	10	10	10	10	10	12	14	14	14	16	18	18	18	18	18	20	22	24
12	South Sydney	0	2	4	4	4	6	6	6	6	8	8	8	10	10	12	14	16	16	16	16	16	18	20	22	22	22
13	New Zealand	2	2	2	2	4	6	6	6	8	8	8	10	10	12	14	16	16	18	18	18	18	18	18	18	18	18
14	Wests	2	2	2	2	2	4	4	6	6	6	6	8	8	8	8	8	10	12	12	12	14	14	16	16	16	18
15	Gold Coast	0	0	2	2	2	2	2	4	6	8	8	10	10	10	10	12	14	16	18	18	18	18	18	18	18	18
16	Newcastle	0	2	2	2	2	2	2	2	2	4	4	6	6	6	8	8	8	8	8	8	10	12	14	14	14	14

== Finals series ==
Home	Score	Away	Match Information
Home	Score	Away	Date and Time (Local)	Venue	Referees	Crowd
QUALIFYING & ELIMINATION FINALS
Sydney Roosters	24 – 22	Brisbane Broncos	8 September 2017, 8:00 pm	Allianz Stadium	Matt Cecchin; Alan Shortall	21,212
Melbourne Storm	18 – 16	Parramatta Eels	9 September 2017, 4:15 pm	AAMI Park	Ben Cummins; Chris Sutton	22,626
Manly Warringah Sea Eagles	10 – 22	Penrith Panthers	9 September 2017, 7:45 pm	Allianz Stadium	Gerard Sutton; Adam Gee	15,408
Cronulla-Sutherland Sharks	14 – 15	North Queensland Cowboys †	10 September 2017, 4:15 pm	Allianz Stadium	Ashley Klein; Gavin Badger	16,115
SEMI FINALS
Brisbane Broncos	13 – 6	Penrith Panthers	15 September 2017, 8:00 pm	Suncorp Stadium	Gerard Sutton; Adam Gee	38,623
Parramatta Eels	16 – 24	North Queensland Cowboys	16 September 2017, 7:45 pm	ANZ Stadium	Matt Cecchin; Ben Cummins	41,287
PRELIMINARY FINALS
Melbourne Storm	30 – 0	Brisbane Broncos	22 September 2017, 7:55 pm	AAMI Park	Matt Cecchin; Ben Cummins	28,821
Sydney Roosters	16 – 29	North Queensland Cowboys	23 September 2017, 7:40 pm	Allianz Stadium	Gerard Sutton; Adam Gee	28,108

† Match decided in extra time.

=== Chart ===
Qualifying and elimination finals
9 Sept, AAMI Park
1	Melbourne	18
4	Parramatta	16
10 Sept, Allianz Stadium
5	Cronulla-Sutherland	14
8	North Queensland	15
9 Sept, Allianz Stadium
6	Manly-Warringah	10
7	Penrith	22
8 Sept, Allianz Stadium
2	Sydney	24
3	Brisbane	22

Semi-finals
16 Sept, ANZ Stadium
Parramatta	16
North Queensland	24
15 Sept, Suncorp Stadium
Brisbane	13
Penrith	6

Preliminary finals
22 Sept, AAMI Park
Melbourne	30
Brisbane	0
23 Sept, Allianz Stadium
Sydney	16
North Queensland	29

Grand final
1 Oct, ANZ Stadium
Melbourne	34
North Queensland	6

== Grand Final ==
Sunday, 1 October
7:30pm

Melbourne Storm	34 - 6	North Queensland Cowboys

ANZ Stadium
Attendance: 79,722
Clive Churchill Medalist: Billy Slater

== Player statistics and records ==
- Cameron Smith became the most prolific goal kicker in NRL history when he kicked his 943rd goal in Round 9. During the Finals he surpassed Darren Lockyer as the most capped player in NRL history with his 356th game and became the first player to kick 1,000 NRL goals.
- Nathan Cleary, 19, broke the record for the youngest player to score 200 points in a season which was set by Graham Eadie, 20, in 1974. Cleary also became the youngest player to be the season's leading points scorer since Harold Horder in 1913.
- Kirisome Auva'a scored the fastest try in NRL history in 13 seconds for Parramatta Eels against Brisbane Broncos in Round 25.

The following statistics are as of the conclusion of Round 26.

Top 5 point scorers

Points	Player	Tries	Goals	Field Goals
216	Nathan Cleary	11	86	0
191	Gareth Widdop	10	75	1
190	Jarrod Croker	9	77	0
176	Jordan Kahu	9	69	2
164	Cameron Smith	2	78	0

Top 5 try scorers

Tries	Player
23	Suliasi Vunivalu
22	Alex Johnston
21	Jordan Rapana
20	Semi Radradra
19	Josh Addo-Carr

Top 5 goal scorers

Goals	Player
86	Nathan Cleary
78	Cameron Smith
77	Jarrod Croker
75	Gareth Widdop
69	Jordan Kahu

Top 5 tacklers

Tackles	Player
1,155	Cameron McInnes
986	Simon Mannering
909	Aiden Tolman
902	Apisai Koroisau
891	Elijah Taylor

== 2017 Transfers ==
=== Players ===
Player	2016 Club	2017 Club
Greg Eden	Brisbane Broncos	Super League: Castleford Tigers
Lachlan Maranta	Brisbane Broncos	Queensland Reds (Super Rugby)
Corey Parker	Brisbane Broncos	Retirement
Jack Reed	Brisbane Broncos	Retirement
Jarrod Wallace	Brisbane Broncos	Gold Coast Titans
Shaun Fensom	Canberra Raiders	North Queensland Cowboys
Jarrad Kennedy	Canberra Raiders	Manly Warringah Sea Eagles
Edrick Lee	Canberra Raiders	Cronulla-Sutherland Sharks
Paul Vaughan	Canberra Raiders	St. George Illawarra Dragons
Sam Williams	Canberra Raiders	Super League: Wakefield Trinity
Tim Browne	Canterbury-Bankstown Bulldogs	Penrith Panthers
Lloyd Perrett	Canterbury-Bankstown Bulldogs	Manly Warringah Sea Eagles
Sam Perrett	Canterbury-Bankstown Bulldogs	Retirement
Curtis Rona	Canterbury-Bankstown Bulldogs	Western Force (Super Rugby)
Tony Williams	Canterbury-Bankstown Bulldogs	Cronulla-Sutherland Sharks
Ben Barba	Cronulla-Sutherland Sharks	RC Toulonnais (French rugby union)
Mitch Brown	Cronulla-Sutherland Sharks	Super League: Leigh Centurions
Michael Ennis	Cronulla-Sutherland Sharks	Retirement
Matt McIlwrick	Cronulla-Sutherland Sharks	Wests Tigers
Jesse Sene-Lefao	Cronulla-Sutherland Sharks	Super League: Castleford Tigers
Greg Bird	Gold Coast Titans	Super League: Catalans Dragons
Lachlan Burr	Gold Coast Titans	Super League: Leigh Centurions
Luke Douglas	Gold Coast Titans	Super League: St. Helens
Nathan Friend	Gold Coast Titans	Retirement
Josh Hoffman	Gold Coast Titans	Parramatta Eels
Nene Macdonald	Gold Coast Titans	St. George Illawarra Dragons
David Mead	Gold Coast Titans	Brisbane Broncos
Daniel Mortimer	Gold Coast Titans	Cronulla-Sutherland Sharks
David Shillington	Gold Coast Titans	Retirement
Matt Srama	Gold Coast Titans	Retirement
Zeb Taia	Gold Coast Titans	Super League: St. Helens
Jamie Buhrer	Manly Warringah Sea Eagles	Newcastle Knights
Blake Leary	Manly Warringah Sea Eagles	North Queensland Cowboys
Jamie Lyon	Manly Warringah Sea Eagles	Retirement
Steve Matai	Manly Warringah Sea Eagles	Retirement
Josh Starling	Manly Warringah Sea Eagles	Newcastle Knights
Brett Stewart	Manly Warringah Sea Eagles	Retirement
Tom Symonds	Manly Warringah Sea Eagles	Super League: Huddersfield Giants
Siosaia Vave	Manly Warringah Sea Eagles	Parramatta Eels
Brayden Wiliame	Manly Warringah Sea Eagles	Super League: Catalans Dragons
Blake Green	Melbourne Storm	Manly Warringah Sea Eagles
Ben Hampton	Melbourne Storm	North Queensland Cowboys
Marika Koroibete	Melbourne Storm	Melbourne Rebels (Super Rugby)
Ryan Morgan	Melbourne Storm	Super League: St. Helens
Kevin Proctor	Melbourne Storm	Gold Coast Titans
Matthew White	Melbourne Storm	Burleigh Bears (Intrust Super Cup)
Jake Mamo	Newcastle Knights	Super League: Huddersfield Giants
Jarrod Mullen	Newcastle Knights	Suspension
Robbie Rochow	Newcastle Knights	South Sydney Rabbitohs
Korbin Sims	Newcastle Knights	Brisbane Broncos
Tariq Sims	Newcastle Knights	St. George Illawarra Dragons
Jeremy Smith	Newcastle Knights	Retirement
Kade Snowden	Newcastle Knights	Retirement
Akuila Uate	Newcastle Knights	Manly Warringah Sea Eagles
Ben Henry	New Zealand Warriors	Retirement
Thomas Leuluai	New Zealand Warriors	Super League: Wigan Warriors
Tuimoala Lolohea	New Zealand Warriors	Wests Tigers
Sione Lousi	New Zealand Warriors	Townsville Blackhawks (Intrust Super Cup)
Jeff Robson	New Zealand Warriors	Parramatta Eels
Manu Vatuvei	New Zealand Warriors	Super League: Salford Red Devils
Jonathan Wright	New Zealand Warriors	Manly Warringah Sea Eagles
Ben Hannant	North Queensland Cowboys	Retirement
Rory Kostjasyn	North Queensland Cowboys	Retirement
Tautau Moga	North Queensland Cowboys	Brisbane Broncos
James Tamou	North Queensland Cowboys	Penrith Panthers
Isaac De Gois	Parramatta Eels	Retirement
Kieran Foran	Parramatta Eels	New Zealand Warriors
Michael Gordon	Parramatta Eels	Sydney Roosters
Luke Kelly	Parramatta Eels	South Sydney Rabbitohs
Junior Paulo	Parramatta Eels	Canberra Raiders
Nathan Peats	Parramatta Eels	Gold Coast Titans
Danny Wicks	Parramatta Eels	Retirement
Chris Grevsmuhl	Penrith Panthers	Gold Coast Titans
Zak Hardaker	Penrith Panthers	Super League: Castleford Tigers
Jeremy Latimore	Penrith Panthers	Cronulla-Sutherland Sharks
Suaia Matagi	Penrith Panthers	Parramatta Eels
Kirisome Auva'a	South Sydney Rabbitohs	Parramatta Eels
Nathan Brown	South Sydney Rabbitohs	Parramatta Eels
Joe Burgess	South Sydney Rabbitohs	Super League: Wigan Warriors
Paul Carter	South Sydney Rabbitohs	Sydney Roosters
Luke Keary	South Sydney Rabbitohs	Sydney Roosters
Cameron McInnes	South Sydney Rabbitohs	St. George Illawarra Dragons
Dane Nielsen	South Sydney Rabbitohs	Retirement
Michael Oldfield	South Sydney Rabbitohs	Penrith Panthers
Mike Cooper	St. George Illawarra Dragons	Super League: Warrington Wolves
Ben Creagh	St. George Illawarra Dragons	Retirement
Dunamis Lui	St. George Illawarra Dragons	Canberra Raiders
Benji Marshall	St. George Illawarra Dragons	Brisbane Broncos
Tyrone McCarthy	St. George Illawarra Dragons	Super League: Salford Red Devils
Adam Quinlan	St. George Illawarra Dragons	Hull Kingston Rovers
Mitch Rein	St. George Illawarra Dragons	Penrith Panthers
Dale Copley	Sydney Roosters	Gold Coast Titans
Jackson Hastings	Sydney Roosters	Manly Warringah Sea Eagles
Ian Henderson	Sydney Roosters	Retirement
Sam Moa	Sydney Roosters	Super League: Catalans Dragons
Robbie Farah	Wests Tigers	South Sydney Rabbitohs
Dene Halatau	Wests Tigers	Retirement
Jordan Rankin	Wests Tigers	Super League: Huddersfield Giants
Tim Simona	Wests Tigers	Indefinite ban
Curtis Sironen	Wests Tigers	Manly Warringah Sea Eagles
Dave Taylor	Super League: Catalans Dragons	Canberra Raiders
Joe Wardle	Super League: Huddersfield Giants	Newcastle Knights
Frank Pritchard	Super League: Hull F.C.	Parramatta Eels
Ken Sio	Super League: Hull Kingston Rovers	Newcastle Knights
James Segeyaro	Super League: Leeds Rhinos	Cronulla-Sutherland Sharks
Daniel Vidot	Super League: Salford Red Devils	Gold Coast Titans
Joe Greenwood	Super League: St. Helens	Gold Coast Titans
Anthony Tupou	Super League: Wakefield Trinity Wildcats	Newcastle Knights
Dan Sarginson	Super League: Wigan Warriors	Gold Coast Titans
Frank Winterstein	Australia (Rugby sevens)	Manly Warringah Sea Eagles
Jarryd Hayne	Fiji (Rugby sevens)	Gold Coast Titans
Jamal Idris	Hiatus	Wests Tigers
Zane Tetevano	N/A	Sydney Roosters

=== Coaches ===
Coach	2016 Club	2017 Club
Ivan Cleary	N/A	Wests Tigers
Stephen Kearney	New Zealand	New Zealand Warriors
