= 2018 NRL season =

111th season of professional rugby league in Australia

2018 National Rugby League
- Duration: March 8 – September 30, 2018
- Teams: 16
- Premiers: Sydney Roosters (14th title)
- Minor premiers: Sydney Roosters (20th title)
- Matches played: 201
- Points scored: 8,152
- Average attendance: 16,205
- Total attendance: 3,257,235
- Top points scorer: Latrell Mitchell (248)
- Wooden spoon: Parramatta Eels (14th spoon)
- Dally M Medal: Roger Tuivasa-Sheck
- Top try-scorer: David Fusitu'a (23)

The 2018 NRL season was the 111th season of professional rugby league in Australia and the 21st season run by the National Rugby League. The main competition, known as the 2018 Telstra Premiership due to sponsorship from Telstra, featured 16 teams playing 25 weekly rounds of matches from March until September, resulting in the top eight teams playing a series of finals matches to determine which two teams reached the 2018 NRL Grand Final.

== Teams ==
The lineup of teams remained unchanged for the 12th consecutive year.

Colours	Club	Season	Home ground(s)	Head coach	Captain(s)
	Brisbane Broncos	31st season	Suncorp Stadium	Wayne Bennett	Darius Boyd
	Canberra Raiders	37th season	GIO Stadium Canberra	Ricky Stuart	Jarrod Croker
	Canterbury-Bankstown Bulldogs	84th season	ANZ Stadium & Belmore Sports Ground	Dean Pay	Josh Jackson
	Cronulla-Sutherland Sharks	52nd season	Southern Cross Group Stadium	Shane Flanagan	Paul Gallen & Wade Graham
	Gold Coast Titans	12th season	Cbus Super Stadium	Garth Brennan	Ryan James
	Manly Warringah Sea Eagles	69th season	Lottoland	Trent Barrett	Daly Cherry-Evans
	Melbourne Storm	21st season	AAMI Park	Craig Bellamy	Cameron Smith
	Newcastle Knights	31st season	McDonald Jones Stadium	Nathan Brown	Jamie Buhrer & Mitchell Pearce
	New Zealand Warriors	24th season	Mt. Smart Stadium	Stephen Kearney	Roger Tuivasa-Sheck
	North Queensland Cowboys	24th season	1300SMILES Stadium	Paul Green	Johnathan Thurston & Matt Scott
	Parramatta Eels	72nd season	ANZ Stadium	Brad Arthur	Tim Mannah, Beau Scott & Clint Gutherson
	Penrith Panthers	52nd season	Panthers Stadium	~~Anthony Griffin~~ → Cameron Ciraldo (interim)	~~Peter Wallace~~ → James Maloney
	South Sydney Rabbitohs	109th season	ANZ Stadium	Anthony Seibold	Greg Inglis
	St. George Illawarra Dragons	20th season	UOW Jubilee Oval & WIN Stadium	Paul McGregor	Gareth Widdop
	Sydney Roosters	111th season	Allianz Stadium	Trent Robinson	Jake Friend & Boyd Cordner
	Wests Tigers	19th season	Leichhardt Oval, Campbelltown Stadium & ANZ Stadium	Ivan Cleary	Chris Lawrence, Benji Marshall, Elijah Taylor, Josh Reynolds & Russell Packer

== Pre-season ==
The 2018 pre-season as usual saw a number of trials. In addition it saw British clubs Leeds Rhinos, Hull F.C., and Wigan Warriors conduct pre-season tours to Australia. Leeds's tour was ahead of their the 2018 World Club Challenge clash Melbourne Storm (won by Melbourne 38–4), while Hull's and Wigan's was ahead of them hosting a Super League game at Wollongong Showground.

Trial results

italics indicates a non-NRL club

- 7 February: Newcastle Knights 26-22 Melbourne Storm
- 10 February: Brisbane Broncos 16-6 Central Queensland Capras
- 17 February: New Zealand Warriors 24-14 Melbourne Storm
- 17 February: St George Illawarra Dragons 24-18 Hull F.C.
- 17 February: Canterbury-Bankstown Bulldogs 16-12 Canberra Raiders
- 17 February: Penrith Panthers 30-18 Sydney Roosters
- 17 February: Cronulla-Sutherland Sharks 30-14 Manly Warringah Sea Eagles
- 17 February: South Sydney Rabbitohs 18-8 Wigan Warriors
- 17 February: Brisbane Broncos 38-10 Gold Coast Titans
- 17 February: Wests Tigers 30-16 North Queensland Cowboys
- 23 February: North Queensland Cowboys 16-14 Melbourne Storm
- 24 February: Brisbane Broncos 26-12 PNG Hunters
- 24 February: New Zealand Warriors 20-14 Gold Coast Titans
- 24 February: Canterbury-Bankstown Bulldogs 24-10 Penrith Panthers
- 24 February: Sydney Roosters 28-26 Manly Warringah Sea Eagles
- 24 February: Parramatta Eels 26-6 Newcastle Knights
- 24 February: Cronulla-Sutherland Sharks 24-12 Wests Tigers
- 24 February: South Sydney Rabbitohs 22-18 St George Illawarra Dragons

== Regular season ==
With the City vs. Country representative game having been scrapped, the NRL scheduled 6 games to take place in regional areas of New South Wales and Queensland as a replacement: Tamworth, Bathurst & Mudgee, and Toowoomba, Gladstone & Cairns.

The overall structure of the season's draw was also revised. The second game of the 2018 State of Origin series was played as a stand-alone fixture on a Sunday to avoid conflict with the regular season. Due to this the competition was shortened to 25 rounds and each team got 1 bye as opposed to 2 in previous years.

Team	1	2	3	4	5	6	7	8	9	10	11	12	13	14	15	16	17	18	19	20	21	22	23	24	25	F1	F2	F3	GF
Brisbane Broncos	**SGI**; **22**	NQL; 4	**WTI**; **2***	GCT; 12	**NEW**; **5**	**NZL**; **9**	MEL; 14	**SOU**; **4**	CBY; 2	MAN; 14	SYD; 6	PAR; 8	X	**MEL**; **16**	**CRO**; **4**	CAN; 4	**GCT**; **34**	NZL; 20	PEN; 32	CRO; 2	**CBY**; **14**	**NQL**; **4**	SOU; 20	**SYD**; **14**	MAN; 32	SGI; 30			
Canberra Raiders	**GCT**; **2**	NEW; 2	NZL; 1	**MAN**; **16**	CBY; 16	PAR; 16	**SOU**; **20**	**NQL**; **10**	GCT; 14	CRO; 8	**SGI**; **7**	MAN; 1	X	PEN; 1	**WTI**; **36**	**BRI**; **4**	**CBY**; **4**	NQL; 26	**CRO**; **4**	**MEL**; **34**	**PEN**; **9**	WTI; 2	SYD; 2	SOU; 12	**NZL**; **4**				
Canterbury-Bankstown Bulldogs	MEL; 18	**SYD**; **18**	PEN; 2	SOU; 4	**CAN**; **16**	**NQL**; **17**	SYD; 6	**PEN**; **8**	**BRI**; **2**	PAR; 8	**CRO**; **6**	WTI; 4	X	SGI; 2	GCT; 22	**NEW**; **20**	CAN; 4	SOU; 18	PAR; 6	WTI; 12	BRI; 14	**MAN**; **12**	NZL; 1	**SGI**; **38**	CRO; 12				
Cronulla-Sutherland Sharks	**NQL**; **6**	SGI; 4	**PAR**; **10**	MEL; 10	SYD; 18	**SGI**; **20**	PEN; 4	**GCT**; **1**	PAR; 2	**CAN**; **8**	CBY; 6	**NEW**; **38**	**SOU**; **8**	WTI; 8	BRI; 4	**NZL**; **3**	X	**PEN**; **12**	CAN; 4	**BRI**; **2**	MAN; 1*	**MEL**; **3**	NQL; 12	NEW; 26	**CBY**; **12**	**SYD**; **9**	PEN; 1	**MEL**; **16**	
Gold Coast Titans	CAN; 2	**NZL**; **12**	SGI; 46	**BRI**; **12**	MAN; 12	**PEN**; **23**	**NQL**; **12**	CRO; 1	**CAN**; **14**	MEL; 14	NEW; 7	**SYD**; **20**	X	SOU; 2	**CBY**; **22**	**WTI**; **18**	BRI; 34	SYD; 8	**NEW**; **6**	NZL; 24	**PAR**; **16**	PEN; 1*	**MAN**; **8**	MEL; 2	**NQL**; **4**				
Manly Warringah Sea Eagles	**NEW**; **1***	PAR; 54	**SOU**; **28**	CAN; 16	**GCT**; **12**	WTI; 26	**PAR**; **34**	NEW; 6	**SYD**; **2**	**BRI**; **14**	**MEL**; **20**	**CAN**; **1**	NQL; 14	**NZL**; **20**	**SGI**; **24**	**PEN**; **8**	X	MEL; 1	SYD; 32	PEN; 4	**CRO**; **1***	CBY; 12	GCT; 8	**WTI**; **2**	**BRI**; **32**				
Melbourne Storm	**CBY**; **18**	WTI; 2	NQL; 16	**CRO**; **10**	**WTI**; **1**	NEW; 26	**BRI**; **14**	NZL; 40	**SGI**; **20**	**GCT**; **14**	MAN; 20	**NQL**; **1**	X	BRI; 16	**NEW**; **18**	**SYD**; **1**	SGI; 22	**MAN**; **1**	**NZL**; **6**	CAN; 34	**SOU**; **10**	CRO; 3	PAR; 16	**GCT**; **2**	PEN; 6	SOU; 1	X	CRO; 16	**SYD**; **15**
Newcastle Knights	MAN; 1*	**CAN**; **2**	**SYD**; **30**	**SGI**; **18**	BRI; 5	**MEL**; **26**	**WTI**; **2**	**MAN**; **6**	SOU; 18	PEN; 11	**GCT**; **7**	CRO; 38	**PAR**; **26**	SYD; 2	MEL; 18	CBY; 20	X	PAR; 2	GCT; 6	**NQL**; **2**	WTI; 9	**NZL**; **16**	**PEN**; **8**	**CRO**; **26**	SGI; 10				
New Zealand Warriors	**SOU**; **12**	GCT; 12	**CAN**; **1**	**SYD**; **24**	NQL; 10	BRI; 9	SGI; 8	**MEL**; **40**	WTI; 22	SYD; 32	**PAR**; **10**	SOU; 20	X	MAN; 20	**NQL**; **7**	CRO; 3	**PEN**; **32**	**BRI**; **20**	MEL; 6	**GCT**; **24**	SGI; 6	NEW; 16	**CBY**; **1**	PEN; 20	CAN; 4	**PEN**; **15**			
North Queensland Cowboys	CRO; 6	**BRI**; **4**	**MEL**; **16**	PEN; 19	**NZL**; **10**	CBY; 17	GCT; 12	CAN; 10	**PEN**; **6**	**WTI**; **8**	SOU; 1	MEL; 1	**MAN**; **14**	PAR; 6	NZL; 7	SOU; 1	X	**CAN**; **26**	SGI; 14	NEW; 2	**SYD**; **6**	BRI; 4	**CRO**; **12**	PAR; 38	**GCT**; **4**				
Parramatta Eels	**PEN**; **10**	**MAN**; **54**	CRO; 10	**WTI**; **10**	PEN; 6	**CAN**; **16**	MAN; 34	**WTI**; **2**	**CRO**; **2**	**CBY**; **8**	NZL; 10	**BRI**; **8**	NEW; 26	**NQL**; **6**	**SOU**; **18**	**SGI**; **2**	X	**NEW**; **2**	**CBY**; **6**	**SOU**; **6**	GCT; 16	SGI; 36	**MEL**; **16**	**NQL**; **38**	SYD; 34				
Penrith Panthers	PAR; 10	SOU; 4	**CBY**; **2**	**NQL**; **19**	**PAR**; **6**	GCT; 23	**CRO**; **4**	CBY; 8	NQL; 6	**NEW**; **11**	WTI; 14	SGI; 26	X	**CAN**; **1**	**SYD**; **26**	MAN; 8	NZL; 32	CRO; 12	**BRI**; **32**	**MAN**; **4**	CAN; 9	**GCT**; **1***	NEW; 8	**NZL**; **20**	**MEL**; **6**	NZL; 15	**CRO**; **1**		
South Sydney Rabbitohs	NZL; 12	**PEN**; **4**	MAN; 28	**CBY**; **4**	**SGI**; **4**	**SYD**; **12**	CAN; 20	BRI; 4	**NEW**; **18**	SGI; 14	**NQL**; **1**	**NZL**; **20**	CRO; 8	**GCT**; **2**	PAR; 18	**NQL**; **1**	X	**CBY**; **18**	**WTI**; **16**	PAR; 6	MEL; 10	SYD; 4	**BRI**; **20**	**CAN**; **12**	**WTI**; **41**	**MEL**; **1**	SGI; 1	**SYD**; **8**	
St. George Illawarra Dragons	BRI; 22	**CRO**; **4**	**GCT**; **46**	NEW; 18	SOU; 4	CRO; 20	**NZL**; **8**	**SYD**; **16**	MEL; 20	**SOU**; **14**	CAN; 7	**PEN**; **26**	X	**CBY**; **2**	MAN; 24	PAR; 2	**MEL**; **22**	WTI; 4	**NQL**; **14**	**SYD**; **18**	NZL; 6	**PAR**; **36**	**WTI**; **10**	CBY; 38	**NEW**; **10**	**BRI**; **30**	**SOU**; **1**		
Sydney Roosters	**WTI**; **2**	CBY; 18	NEW; 30	NZL; 24	**CRO**; **18**	SOU; 12	**CBY**; **6**	SGI; 16	MAN; 2	**NZL**; **32**	**BRI**; **6**	GCT; 20	WTI; 2	**NEW**; **2**	PEN; 26	MEL; 1	X	**GCT**; **8**	**MAN**; **32**	SGI; 18	NQL; 6	**SOU**; **4**	**CAN**; **2**	BRI; 14	**PAR**; **34**	CRO; 9	X	SOU; 8	MEL; 15
Wests Tigers	SYD; 2	**MEL**; **2**	BRI; 2*	PAR; 10	MEL; 1	**MAN**; **26**	NEW; 2	PAR; 2	**NZL**; **22**	NQL; 8	**PEN**; **14**	**CBY**; **4**	**SYD**; **2**	**CRO**; **8**	CAN; 36	GCT; 18	X	**SGI**; **4**	**SOU**; **16**	**CBY**; **12**	**NEW**; **9**	**CAN**; **2**	SGI; 10	MAN; 2	SOU; 41				
Team	1	2	3	4	5	6	7	8	9	10	11	12	13	14	15	16	17	18	19	20	21	22	23	24	25	F1	F2	F3	GF

Bold – Opposition's Home game
X – Bye
* – Golden point game
Opponent for round listed above margin

== Ladder ==
Pos	Team	Pld	W	D	L	B	PF	PA	PD	Pts	
1	Sydney Roosters (M, P)	24	16	0	8	1	542	361	+181	34	Advance to finals series
2	Melbourne Storm	24	16	0	8	1	536	363	+173	34	Advance to finals series
3	South Sydney Rabbitohs	24	16	0	8	1	582	437	+145	34	Advance to finals series
4	Cronulla-Sutherland Sharks	24	16	0	8	1	519	423	+96	34	Advance to finals series
5	Penrith Panthers	24	15	0	9	1	517	461	+56	32	Advance to finals series
6	Brisbane Broncos	24	15	0	9	1	556	500	+56	32	Advance to finals series
7	St. George Illawarra Dragons	24	15	0	9	1	519	472	+47	32	Advance to finals series
8	New Zealand Warriors	24	15	0	9	1	472	447	+25	32	Advance to finals series
9	Wests Tigers	24	12	0	12	1	377	460	−83	26	
10	Canberra Raiders	24	10	0	14	1	563	540	+23	22	
11	Newcastle Knights	24	9	0	15	1	414	607	−193	20	
12	Canterbury-Bankstown Bulldogs	24	8	0	16	1	428	474	−46	18	
13	North Queensland Cowboys	24	8	0	16	1	449	521	−72	18	
14	Gold Coast Titans	24	8	0	16	1	472	582	−110	18	
15	Manly-Warringah Sea Eagles	24	7	0	17	1	500	622	−122	16	
16	Parramatta Eels (W)	24	6	0	18	1	374	550	−176	14	

Updated to match(es) played on 2 September 2018. Source: 2018 NRL Ladder
(M) Minor premiers; (P) Premiers; (W) Wooden spoon

=== Ladder progression ===
- Numbers highlighted in green indicate that the team finished the round inside the top 8.
- Numbers highlighted in blue indicates the team finished first on the ladder in that round.
- Numbers highlighted in red indicates the team finished last place on the ladder in that round.
- Underlined numbers indicate that the team had a bye during that round.

	Team	1	2	3	4	5	6	7	8	9	10	11	12	13	14	15	16	17	18	19	20	21	22	23	24	25
1	Sydney	0	2	4	4	6	6	8	8	10	12	12	14	16	18	20	20	22	24	26	28	30	32	32	32	34
2	Melbourne	2	2	4	4	4	6	8	10	10	12	12	14	16	18	20	22	24	26	28	30	30	30	32	34	34
3	South Sydney	0	0	2	4	4	6	8	8	10	12	14	16	18	20	22	24	26	28	28	30	32	32	32	32	34
4	Cronulla-Sutherland	0	0	2	4	4	4	6	8	10	12	14	16	16	18	18	20	22	24	26	26	26	28	30	32	34
5	Penrith	2	4	4	6	8	10	10	12	12	14	16	18	20	22	22	22	24	24	24	26	28	30	30	30	32
6	Brisbane	0	2	4	4	4	6	6	8	10	10	12	14	16	16	18	20	22	22	24	26	26	26	28	30	32
7	St. George Illawarra	2	4	6	8	10	12	12	14	16	16	18	18	20	22	24	26	26	26	28	28	28	28	30	30	32
8	New Zealand	2	4	6	8	10	10	12	12	14	14	16	16	18	20	22	22	22	24	24	24	26	28	28	30	32
9	Wests	2	4	4	6	8	10	10	10	10	12	12	14	14	14	14	14	16	18	20	20	22	24	24	26	26
10	Canberra	0	0	0	0	2	4	4	6	8	8	8	10	12	12	14	14	16	18	18	18	18	18	20	22	22
11	Newcastle	2	4	4	4	6	6	8	10	10	10	10	10	12	12	12	12	14	16	18	18	18	18	20	20	20
12	Canterbury-Bankstown	0	0	2	2	2	4	4	4	4	6	6	6	8	8	8	10	10	10	10	12	14	14	16	18	18
13	North Queensland	2	2	2	2	2	2	4	4	6	6	6	6	8	8	8	8	10	10	10	12	12	14	14	16	18
14	Gold Coast	2	2	2	4	6	6	6	6	6	6	8	8	10	10	12	14	14	14	14	16	16	16	18	18	18
15	Manly-Warringah	0	2	2	4	4	4	4	4	4	6	8	8	8	8	8	10	12	12	12	12	14	16	16	16	16
16	Parramatta	0	0	0	0	0	0	2	4	4	4	4	4	4	6	6	6	8	8	10	10	12	14	14	14	14

== Finals series ==
Home	Score	Away	Match Information
Home	Score	Away	Date and Time (Local)	Venue	Referees	Crowd
QUALIFYING & ELIMINATION FINALS
Melbourne Storm	29 – 28	South Sydney Rabbitohs	7 September 2018, 7:50 pm	AAMI Park	Ashley Klein; Adam Gee	17,306
Penrith Panthers	27 – 12	New Zealand Warriors	8 September 2018, 5:40 pm	ANZ Stadium	Matt Cecchin; Henry Perenara	17,168
Sydney Roosters	21 – 12	Cronulla-Sutherland Sharks	8 September 2018, 7:50 pm	Allianz Stadium	Gerard Sutton; Ben Cummins	24,588
Brisbane Broncos	18 – 48	St. George Illawarra Dragons	9 September 2018, 4:10 pm	Suncorp Stadium	Grant Atkins; Chris Sutton	47,296
SEMI FINALS
Cronulla-Sutherland Sharks	21 – 20	Penrith Panthers	14 September 2018, 7:50 pm	Allianz Stadium	Ashley Klein; Adam Gee	19,211
South Sydney Rabbitohs	13 – 12	St. George Illawarra Dragons	15 September 2018, 7:50 pm	ANZ Stadium	Gerard Sutton; Ben Cummins	48,188
PRELIMINARY FINALS
Melbourne Storm	22 – 6	Cronulla-Sutherland Sharks	21 September 2018, 7:55 pm	AAMI Park	Gerard Sutton; Ben Cummins	26,621
Sydney Roosters	12 – 4	South Sydney Rabbitohs	22 September 2018, 7:50 pm	Allianz Stadium	Ashley Klein; Adam Gee	44,380

† Match decided in extra time.

=== Chart ===
Qualifying and elimination finals
8 Sept, Allianz Stadium
1	Sydney	21
4	Cronulla-Sutherland	12
8 Sept, ANZ Stadium
5	Penrith	27
8	New Zealand	12
9 Sept, Suncorp Stadium
6	Brisbane	18
7	St. George Illawarra	48
7 Sept, AAMI Park
2	Melbourne	29
3	South Sydney	28

Semi-finals
14 Sept, Allianz Stadium
Cronulla-Sutherland	21
Penrith	20
15 Sept, ANZ Stadium
South Sydney	13
St. George Illawarra	12

Preliminary finals
22 Sept, Allianz Stadium
Sydney	12
South Sydney	4
21 Sept, AAMI Park
Melbourne	22
Cronulla-Sutherland	6

Grand final
30 Sept, ANZ Stadium
Sydney	21
Melbourne	6

== Grand final ==
Sunday, 30 September
7:35pm (AEST)

Sydney Roosters	21 – 6	Melbourne Storm
Tries: Daniel Tupou (8') 1 Latrell Mitchell (15') 1 Joseph Manu (37') 1 Goals: Latrell Mitchell 4/6 (4' pen, 16', 31' pen, 79' pen); Field Goals: Luke Keary (69') 1	1st: 18 - 0; 2nd: 3 - 6	Tries: Josh Addo-Carr (63') 1 Goals: Cameron Smith 1/1 (64'); Sin Bin: Cameron Munster 2 (30', 78')

ANZ Stadium
Attendance: 82,688
Clive Churchill Medal: Luke Keary
Referee: Gerard Sutton, Ashley Klein

== Player statistics and records ==
- Jamayne Isaako broke the record for the most points scored in a rookie season with 239, which was set by Mick Cronin in 1977 who scored 225 points.
- Gavin Cooper became the first forward in the 111 year history of the NRL to score a try in nine consecutive games, beating the previous record of eight set by Frank Burge in 1918.
- Cameron Smith became the first hooker in NRL history to score 200 points in a season.

The following statistics are as of the conclusion of Round 25.

Top 5 point scorers

Points	Player	Tries	Goals	Field Goals
233	Jamayne Isaako	11	94	1
228	Latrell Mitchell	15	84	0
191	Gareth Widdop	4	87	1
186	Adam Reynolds	4	84	2
181	Cameron Smith	1	88	1

Top 5 try scorers

Tries	Player
22	David Fusitu'a
21	Valentine Holmes
18	Robert Jennings
18	Corey Oates
17	Blake Ferguson
17	Josh Addo-Carr

Top 5 goal scorers

Goals	Player
94	Jamayne Isaako
88	Cameron Smith
87	Gareth Widdop
84	Adam Reynolds
84	Latrell Mitchell

Top 5 tacklers

Tackles	Player
1,102	Jake Friend
1,062	Cameron McInnes
968	Jake Trbojevic
963	Matt Eisenhuth
954	Aidan Guerra

== 2018 Transfers ==
=== Players ===
Player	2017 Club	2018 Club
Jai Arrow	Brisbane Broncos	Gold Coast Titans
Adam Blair	Brisbane Broncos	New Zealand Warriors
Herman Ese'ese	Brisbane Broncos	Newcastle Knights
Ben Hunt	Brisbane Broncos	St. George Illawarra Dragons
Benji Marshall	Brisbane Broncos	Wests Tigers
David Mead	Brisbane Broncos	Super League: Catalans Dragons
Tautau Moga	Brisbane Broncos	Newcastle Knights
Travis Waddell	Brisbane Broncos	Souths Logan Magpies (Intrust Super Cup)
Kurt Baptiste	Canberra Raiders	Sydney Roosters
Jeff Lima	Canberra Raiders	Retirement
Clay Priest	Canberra Raiders	Canterbury-Bankstown Bulldogs
Dave Taylor	Canberra Raiders	Central Queensland Capras (Intrust Super Cup)
James Graham	Canterbury-Bankstown Bulldogs	St. George Illawarra Dragons
Sam Kasiano	Canterbury-Bankstown Bulldogs	Melbourne Storm
Brenko Lee	Canterbury-Bankstown Bulldogs	Gold Coast Titans
Josh Reynolds	Canterbury-Bankstown Bulldogs	Wests Tigers
Chase Stanley	Canterbury-Bankstown Bulldogs	Toronto Wolfpack
Gerard Beale	Cronulla-Sutherland Sharks	New Zealand Warriors
Jack Bird	Cronulla-Sutherland Sharks	Brisbane Broncos
Fa'amanu Brown	Cronulla-Sutherland Sharks	Canterbury-Bankstown Bulldogs
Adam Clydsdale	Cronulla-Sutherland Sharks	Retirement
Chris Heighington	Cronulla-Sutherland Sharks	Newcastle Knights
Jeremy Latimore	Cronulla-Sutherland Sharks	St. George Illawarra Dragons
James Maloney	Cronulla-Sutherland Sharks	Penrith Panthers
Daniel Mortimer	Cronulla-Sutherland Sharks	Leigh Centurions
Sam Tagataese	Cronulla-Sutherland Sharks	Brisbane Broncos
Tony Williams	Cronulla-Sutherland Sharks	Parramatta Eels
Joe Greenwood	Gold Coast Titans	Super League: Wigan Warriors
Jarryd Hayne	Gold Coast Titans	Parramatta Eels
Chris McQueen	Gold Coast Titans	Wests Tigers
Agnatius Paasi	Gold Coast Titans	New Zealand Warriors
Eddy Pettybourne	Gold Coast Titans	Toulouse Olympique
Leivaha Pulu	Gold Coast Titans	New Zealand Warriors
Tyrone Roberts	Gold Coast Titans	Super League: Warrington Wolves
Dan Sarginson	Gold Coast Titans	Super League: Wigan Warriors
Daniel Vidot	Gold Coast Titans	Retirement
William Zillman	Gold Coast Titans	Retirement
Pita Godinet	Manly Warringah Sea Eagles	Wests Tigers
Blake Green	Manly Warringah Sea Eagles	New Zealand Warriors
Jarrad Kennedy	Manly Warringah Sea Eagles	N/A
Brenton Lawrence	Manly Warringah Sea Eagles	Retirement
Darcy Lussick	Manly Warringah Sea Eagles	Toronto Wolfpack
Cooper Cronk	Melbourne Storm	Sydney Roosters
Slade Griffin	Melbourne Storm	Newcastle Knights
Tohu Harris	Melbourne Storm	New Zealand Warriors
Jordan McLean	Melbourne Storm	North Queensland Cowboys
Nate Myles	Melbourne Storm	Retirement
Mark Nicholls	Melbourne Storm	South Sydney Rabbitohs
Robbie Rochow	Melbourne Storm	Wests Tigers
Brendan Elliot	Newcastle Knights	Gold Coast Titans
Dane Gagai	Newcastle Knights	South Sydney Rabbitohs
Trent Hodkinson	Newcastle Knights	Cronulla-Sutherland Sharks
Sam Mataora	Newcastle Knights	Retirement
Peter Mata'utia	Newcastle Knights	Leigh Centurions
Mickey Paea	Newcastle Knights	Super League: Hull F.C.
Pauli Pauli	Newcastle Knights	Super League: Wakefield Trinity
Tyler Randell	Newcastle Knights	Super League: Wakefield Trinity
Josh Starling	Newcastle Knights	Retirement
Jack Stockwell	Newcastle Knights	Gold Coast Titans
Anthony Tupou	Newcastle Knights	Retirement
Joe Wardle	Newcastle Knights	Super League: Castleford Tigers
Kieran Foran	New Zealand Warriors	Canterbury-Bankstown Bulldogs
Charlie Gubb	New Zealand Warriors	Canberra Raiders
Ryan Hoffman	New Zealand Warriors	Melbourne Storm
Jacob Lillyman	New Zealand Warriors	Newcastle Knights
Ben Matulino	New Zealand Warriors	Wests Tigers
Bodene Thompson	New Zealand Warriors	Leigh Centurions
Blake Leary	North Queensland Cowboys	Burleigh Bears (Intrust Super Cup)
Ray Thompson	North Queensland Cowboys	Retirement
Frank Pritchard	Parramatta Eels	Retirement
Semi Radradra	Parramatta Eels	RC Toulonnais (French rugby union)
Jeff Robson	Parramatta Eels	Retirement
Sitaleki Akauola	Penrith Panthers	Super League: Warrington Wolves
Tim Browne	Penrith Panthers	Retirement
Bryce Cartwright	Penrith Panthers	Gold Coast Titans
Leilani Latu	Penrith Panthers	Gold Coast Titans
Matt Moylan	Penrith Panthers	Cronulla-Sutherland Sharks
Michael Oldfield	Penrith Panthers	Canberra Raiders
Mitch Rein	Penrith Panthers	Gold Coast Titans
Bryson Goodwin	South Sydney Rabbitohs	Super League: Warrington Wolves
Aaron Gray	South Sydney Rabbitohs	Cronulla-Sutherland Sharks
Luke Kelly	South Sydney Rabbitohs	Retirement
Dave Tyrrell	South Sydney Rabbitohs	Eastern Suburbs Tigers (Intrust Super Cup)
Josh Dugan	St. George Illawarra Dragons	Cronulla-Sutherland Sharks
Kalifa Faifai Loa	St. George Illawarra Dragons	Townsville Blackhawks (Intrust Super Cup)
Siliva Havili	St. George Illawarra Dragons	Canberra Raiders
Jake Marketo	St. George Illawarra Dragons	Timișoara Saracens (Romanian rugby union)
Will Matthews	St. George Illawarra Dragons	Gold Coast Titans
Josh McCrone	St. George Illawarra Dragons	Toronto Wolfpack
Russell Packer	St. George Illawarra Dragons	Wests Tigers
Joel Thompson	St. George Illawarra Dragons	Manly Warringah Sea Eagles
Kane Evans	Sydney Roosters	Parramatta Eels
Michael Gordon	Sydney Roosters	Gold Coast Titans
Aidan Guerra	Sydney Roosters	Newcastle Knights
Shaun Kenny-Dowall	Sydney Roosters	Newcastle Knights
Mitchell Pearce	Sydney Roosters	Newcastle Knights
Connor Watson	Sydney Roosters	Newcastle Knights
Matt Ballin	Wests Tigers	Retirement
Joel Edwards	Wests Tigers	Limoux Grizzlies (Elite One Championship)
Jamal Idris	Wests Tigers	Retirement
Kyle Lovett	Wests Tigers	Leigh Centurions
Mitchell Moses	Wests Tigers	Parramatta Eels
Ava Seumanufagai	Wests Tigers	Cronulla-Sutherland Sharks
James Tedesco	Wests Tigers	Sydney Roosters
Aaron Woods	Wests Tigers	Canterbury-Bankstown Bulldogs
Mahe Fonua	Super League: Hull F.C.	Wests Tigers
Mitchell Allgood	Super League: Wakefield Trinity	St. George Illawarra Dragons
Sam Williams	Super League: Wakefield Trinity	Canberra Raiders
Peta Hiku	Super League: Warrington Wolves	New Zealand Warriors
Corey Thompson	Super League: Widnes Vikings	Wests Tigers
Anthony Gelling	Super League: Wigan Warriors	New Zealand Warriors
Frank-Paul Nu'uausala	Super League: Wigan Warriors	Sydney Roosters
Reece Robinson	New South Wales Waratahs (Super Rugby)	Sydney Roosters
Sandor Earl	Suspension	Melbourne Storm

=== Coaches ===
Coach	2017 Club	2018 Club
Michael Maguire	South Sydney Rabbitohs	New Zealand
Brad Fittler	Lebanon	New South Wales
