= 2017 St. George Illawarra Dragons season =

- NRL rank: 11
- 2017 record: Wins: 12; draws: 2; losses: 12
- Points scored: For: 341; against: 538

Team information
- CEO: Peter Doust
- Coach: Paul McGregor
- Captain: Gareth Widdop
- Stadium: WIN Jubilee Oval WIN Stadium

Top scorers
- Tries: Jason Nightingale
- Goals: Gareth Widdop
- Points: Gareth Widdop
← 2016	2018 →

The 2017 St. George Illawarra Dragons season was the 19th in the joint venture club's history. The Dragons competed in the NRL's 2017 Telstra Premiership season.

== Gains And Losses of Squad ==
=== Players ===
▲ or ▼	Player	2016 Club	2017 Club
▲	Paul Vaughan	Canberra Raiders	St. George Illawarra Dragons
▲	Nene Macdonald	Gold Coast Titans	St. George Illawarra Dragons
▲	Tariq Sims	Newcastle Knights	St. George Illawarra Dragons
▲	Cameron McInnes	South Sydney Rabbitohs	St. George Illawarra Dragons
▼	Mike Cooper	St. George Illawarra Dragons	Super League: Warrington Wolves
▼	Ben Creagh	St. George Illawarra Dragons	Retirement
▼	Dunamis Lui	St. George Illawarra Dragons	Canberra Raiders
▼	Benji Marshall	St. George Illawarra Dragons	Brisbane Broncos
▼	Tyrone McCarthy	St. George Illawarra Dragons	Super League: Salford Red Devils
▼	Adam Quinlan	St. George Illawarra Dragons	Hull Kingston Rovers
▼	Mitch Rein	St. George Illawarra Dragons	Penrith Panthers

== Regular season ==
Team	1	2	3	4	5	6	7	8	9	10	11	12	13	14	15	16	17	18	19	20	21	22	23	24	25	26	F1	F2	F3	GF
St. George Illawarra Dragons	PEN; 32	PAR; 18	CRO; 6	NZL; 14	WTI; 22	MAN; 25	NQL; 6	SYD; 1*	MEL; 12	CRO; 4	NZL; 16	X	WTI; 4	CBY; 14	PAR; 14	NEW; 4	GCT; 10	X	CAN; 4*	MAN; 30	NEW; 7	SOU; 2	GCT; 26	BRI; 12	PEN; 2	CBY; 6				
Team	1	2	3	4	5	6	7	8	9	10	11	12	13	14	15	16	17	18	19	20	21	22	23	24	25	26	F1	F2	F3	GF

== Season Results ==
ROUND	Home	Score	Away	Match Information
ROUND	Home	Score	Away	Date and Time (AEDT)	Venue	Referee	Attendance
1	St. George Illawarra Dragons	42-10	Penrith Panthers	Saturday, 4 March 2017 4:30 PM	UOW Jubilee Oval	Henry Perenara, Peter Gough	7,283
2	St. George Illawarra Dragons	16-34	Parramatta Eels	Sunday, 12 March, 6:30 PM	WIN Stadium	Dave Munro, Chris Sutton	16,023
3	Cronulla-Sutherland Sharks	10-16	St. George Illawarra Dragons	Sunday, 19 March 2017 6:30 PM	Southern Cross Group Stadium	Ben Cummins, Adam Gee	14,247
4	St. George Illawarra Dragons	26-12	New Zealand Warriors	Sunday, 26 March, 6:30 PM	UOW Jubilee Oval	David Munro, Chris Sutton	11,608
5	Wests Tigers	6-28	St. George Illawarra Dragons	Sunday, 2 April, 4:00 PM	ANZ Stadium	Henry Perenara, Matt Noyen	13,172
6	Manly-Warringah Sea Eagles	10-35	St. George Illawarra Dragons	Saturday, 8 April, 2:30 PM	Lottoland	Gavin Badger, Chris James	11,654
7	St. George Illawarra Dragons	28-22	North Queensland Cowboys	Saturday, 15 April 2017 7:00 PM	WIN Stadium	H. Perenara, M. Noyen	13,886
8 ANZAC Round	Sydney Roosters	13-12 (gp)	St. George Illawarra Dragons	Tuesday, 25 April 2017	Allianz Stadium	B. Cummins, D. Munro	40,864
9	St. George Illawarra Dragons	22-34	Melbourne Storm	Sunday, 30 April 2017	WIN Stadium	M. Cecchin, C. Butler	12,377
10	St. George Illawarra Dragons	14-18	Cronulla-Sutherland Sharks	Friday, 12 May 2017	UOW Jubilee Oval	Gerard Sutton, Chris Butler	15,927
11; Beanies for Brain Cancer Round	New Zealand Warriors	14-30	St George Illawarra Dragons	Friday, 19 May, 6:00pm	FMG Stadium Waikato	Henry Peranara, Peter Gough	11,108
12	North Queensland Cowboys	7th-5th	St. George Illawarra Dragons	BYE
13	St George Illawarra Dragons	16-12	Wests Tigers	Saturday, 3 June, 3:00 PM	ANZ Stadium	Gavin Badger, Peter Gough	12,983
14	Canterbury-Bankstown Bulldogs	16-2	St George Illawarra Dragons	Monday, 12 June 2017 4:00 PM	ANZ Stadium	Ben Cummins, Gavin Badger	24,083
15	Parramatta Eels	24-10	St George Illawarra Dragons	Sunday, 18 June, 4:00 PM	ANZ Stadium	Grant Atkins, Chris Sutton	13,559
16	St George Illawarra Dragons	32-28	Newcastle Knights	Sunday, 25 June 2017 2:00 PM	UOW Jubilee Oval	Adam Gee, Gavin Reynolds	10,174
17	Gold Coast Titans	20–10	St George Illawarra Dragons	Friday, 30 June, 6:00pm	Cbus Super Stadium	Grant Atkins, Chris Sutton	13,140
18	St. George Illawarra Dragons		Canberra Raiders	BYE
19	Canberra Raiders	18-14	St George Illawarra Dragons		GIO Stadium		10,977
20; Women in League Round	St George Illawarra Dragons	52-22	Manly-Warringah Sea Eagles	Sunday, 23 July, 2:00pm	WIN Stadium	Ashley Klein, Alan Shortall	16,883
21	Newcastle Knights	21-14	St George Illawarra Dragons	Saturday 29 July, 3:00pm	McDonald Jones Stadium	: Gavin Badger, Zbignew Przeklasa-Adamski	15,031
22; Retro Round	St George Illawarra Dragons	24-26	South Sydney Rabbitohs	18:00	Sydney Cricket Ground	Ben Cummins, David Munro	12, 312
23	St George Illawarra Dragons	42-16	Gold Coast Titans		UOW Jubilee Oval		8,973
24	Brisbane Broncos	24-12	St George Illawarra Dragons	Friday 18 August, 7:50pm	Suncorp Stadium	Matt Cecchin, Gavin Reynolds	31,832
25	Penrith Panthers	14–16	St George Illawarra Dragons		Pepper Stadium	Gerard Sutton, Ben Cummins	18,848
26	St George Illawarra Dragons	20 - 26	Canterbury-Bankstown Bulldogs		ANZ Stadium	Ashley Klein, Chris Sutton	21,582
Legend: Win Loss Bye

=== Ladder progression ===
	Team	1	2	3	4	5	6	7	8	9	10	11	12	13	14	15	16	17	18	19	20	21	22	23	24	25	26
9	St. George Illawarra Dragons	0	0	2	4	4	4	6	8	8	10	10	12	14	14	16	18	18	20	20	20	20	20	22	22	22	24
