= 2018 St. George Illawarra Dragons season =

- NRL rank: 7th
- 2018 record: Wins: 15; draws: 0; losses: 9
- Points scored: For: 206; against: 100

Team information
- CEO: Peter Doust
- Coach: Paul McGregor
- Captain: Gareth Widdop
- Stadium: WIN Jubilee Oval WIN Stadium
- Avg. attendance: 16,909
- High attendance: 18,589 (vs. Newcastle, round 4)

Top scorers
- Tries: Nene McDonald (10)
- Goals: Gareth Widdop (39)
- Points: Gareth Widdop (82)
← 2017	2019 →

The 2018 St. George Illawarra Dragons season was the 20th in the joint venture club's history. The Dragons competed in the NRL's 2018 Telstra Premiership season.

== Gains And Losses of Squad 2018 ==
=== Players ===
▲ or ▼	Player	2017 Club	2018 Club	Ref(s)
▲	Mitchell Allgood	Super League: Wakefield Trinity	St. George Illawarra Dragons	
▲	Ben Hunt	Brisbane Broncos	St. George Illawarra Dragons	
▲	James Graham	Canterbury-Bankstown Bulldogs	St. George Illawarra Dragons	
▲	Jeremy Latimore	Cronulla-Sutherland Sharks	St. George Illawarra Dragons	
▼	Josh Dugan	St. George Illawarra Dragons	Cronulla-Sutherland Sharks	
▼	Kalifa Faifai Loa	St. George Illawarra Dragons	Townsville Blackhawks (Intrust Super Cup)	
▼	Siliva Havili	St. George Illawarra Dragons	Canberra Raiders	
▼	Jake Marketo	St. George Illawarra Dragons	Timișoara Saracens (Romanian rugby union)	
▼	Will Matthews	St. George Illawarra Dragons	Gold Coast Titans	
▼	Josh McCrone	St. George Illawarra Dragons	Toronto Wolfpack	
▼	Russell Packer	St. George Illawarra Dragons	Wests Tigers	
▼	Joel Thompson	St. George Illawarra Dragons	Manly-Warringah Sea Eagles	

=== Ladder progression ===
Team	1	2	3	4	5	6	7	8	9	10	11	12	13	14	15	16	17	18	19	20	21	22	23	24	25	F1	F2	F3	GF
St. George Illawarra Dragons	BRI; **1st**	**CRO**; **1st**	**GCT**; **1st**	NEW; **1st**	SOU; **1st**	CRO; **1st**	**NZL**; **1st**	**SYD**; **1st**	MEL	**SOU**	CAN	**PEN**	X	**CBY**	MAN	PAR	**MEL**	WTI	**NQL**	**SYD**	NZL	**PAR**	**WTI**	CBY	**NEW**				

Bold – Opposition's Home game
X – Bye
* – Golden point game
Opponent for round listed above margin

== Season Results ==
ROUND	Home	Score	Away	Match Information
ROUND	Home	Score	Away	Date and Time (AEDT)	Venue	Referee	Attendance
1	St George Illawarra Dragons	34 – 12	Brisbane Broncos	Thursday, 8 March, 7:50pm	UOW Jubilee Oval	Matt Cecchin, Alan Shortall	14,457
2	Cronulla-Sutherland Sharks	16 – 20	St George Illawarra Dragons	Thursday, 15 March, 7:50pm	Southern Cross Group Stadium	Gavin Badger, Peter Gough	13,517
3	Gold Coast Titans	8 – 54	St George Illawarra Dragons	Sunday, 25 March, 4:10pm	Clive Berghofer Stadium	Henry Perenara, Chris Butler	7,297
4	St George Illawarra Dragons	30 - 12	Newcastle Knights	Sunday, 1 April, 4:10pm	WIN Stadium	Grant Aitkins, Jon Stone	18,589
5	St George Illawarra Dragons	16 - 12	South Sydney Rabbitohs	Friday 6 April, 7:50pm	UOW Jubilee Oval	Gavin Badger, Peter Gough	16,709
6	St George Illawarra Dragons	40 - 20	Cronulla-Sutherland Sharks	Friday 13 April, 7:50pm	WIN Stadium	Ashley Klein, Gavin Badger	17,882
7	New Zealand Warriors	20 - 12	St George Illawarra Dragons	Friday 20 April, 8:00pm (NZ)	Mt Smart Stadium	Ben Cummins, Henry Perenara	18,295
8	St George Illawarra Dragons	24 - 8	Sydney Roosters	Wednesday 25 April 4:10PM (AEST)	Allianz Stadium	Ashley Klein, Gavin Badger	41,142
9	St George Illawarra Dragons	34 - 14	Melbourne Storm	Sunday, 6 May 2PM (AEST)	UOW Jubilee Stadium	Matt Cecchin, Chris Butler	19,173
10	South Sydney Rabbitohs	24 - 10	St George Illawarra Dragons	Sunday, 13 May 2PM (AEST)	ANZ Stadium	Adam Gee, Ziggy Przeklasa-Adamski	13,062
11	St George Illawarra Dragons	25 - 18	Canberra Raiders	Sunday, 20 May 2PM (AEST)	Glen Willow Stadium	Ashley Klein, Peter Gough	8,962
12	Penrith Panthers	28 - 2	St George Illawarra Dragons	Saturday, 26 7 May:30PPM (AEST)	Panthers Stadium	Gerard Sutton, Chris Sutton	21,565
13		BYE
14*	Canterbury-Bankstown Bulldogs	16 - 18	St George Illawarra Dragons	Monday, 11 June 4PM (AEST)	ANZ Stadium	Matt Cecchin, Tim Roby	21,376
15	St George Illawarra Dragons	32 - 8	Manly-Warringah Sea Eagles	Saturday, 16 7 June:30PM (AEST)	WIN Stadium	Jon Stone, Alan Shortall	13,069
16	St George Illawarra Dragons	20 - 18	Parramatta Eels	Thursday, 28 7 June:50PM (AEST)	WIN Stadium	Ben Cummins, Peter Gough	6,933
17	Melbourne Storm	52 - 30	St George Illawarra Dragons	Thursday, 5 7 July:50PM (AEST)	AAMI Park	Matt Cecchin, Gavin Reynolds	12,167
18	St George Illawarra Dragons	16 - 20	Wests Tigers	Sunday, 15 4 July:10PM (AEST)	UOW Jubilee Stadium	Ben Cummins, Ziggy Przeklasa-Adamski	15,992
19	North Queensland Cowboys	10 - 24	St George Illawarra Dragons	Saturday, 21 7 July:30PM (AEST)	1300SMILES Stadium	Adam Gee, Ziggy Przeklasa-Adamski	18,068
20	Sydney Roosters	36 - 18	St George Illawarra Dragons	Sunday, 29 4 July:10PM (AEST)	Allianz Stadium	Ashley Klein, Chris Sutton	19,878
21	St George Illawarra Dragons	12 - 18	New Zealand Warriors	Saturday, 4 August 3PM	WIN Stadium	Gerard Sutton, Chris Butler	13,924
22	Parramatta Eels	4 – 40	St George Illawarra Dragons	Saturday, 11 7 August:30PM	ANZ Stadium	Adam Gee, Phil Henderson	10,541
23	Wests Tigers	10 – 20	St George Illawarra Dragons	Saturday, 18 5 August:30PM (AEST)	Leichhardt Oval	Grant Atkins, Mayy Noyen	18,387
24	St George Illawarra Dragons	0 – 38	Canterbury-Bankstown Bulldogs	Sunday, 26 4 August:10PM (AEST)	UOW Jubilee Stadium	Ben Cummins, Henry Perenara	12,436
25	Newcastle Knights	14 – 24	St George Illawarra Dragons	Saturday, 1 September	McDonald Jones Stadium	Henry Perenara, Ziggy Przeklasa-Adamski	24,662
Finals 1	Brisbane Broncos	18 – 48	St George Illawarra Dragons	Sunday, 9, 4 September:10pm (AEST)	Suncorp Stadium	Grant Atkins, Chris Sutton	47,296
Finals 2	South Sydney Rabbitohs	13 – 12	St George Illawarra Dragons	Saturday 15 September	ANZ Stadium	Gerard Sutton, Ben Cummins	48,188
Legend: Win Loss Bye
