= Nene Macdonald =

Papua New Guinea international rugby league footballer

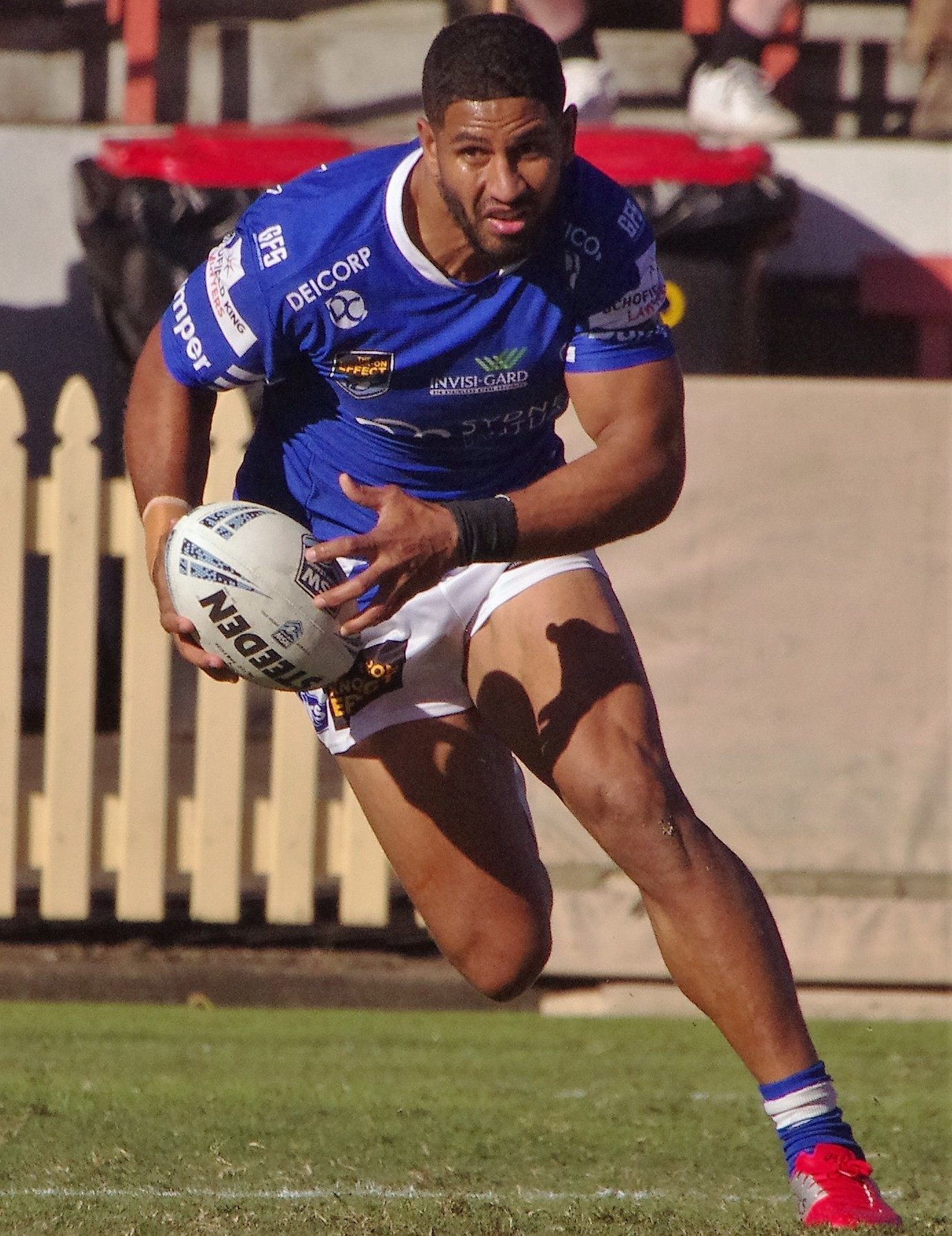

Personal information
- Full name: Bosam Nene Macdonald
- Born: 11 May 1994 (age 32) Port Moresby, Papua New Guinea
- Height: 6 ft 4 in (1.93 m)
- Weight: 16 st 1 lb (102 kg)

Playing information
- Position: Wing, Centre, Fullback
Club
| Years | Team | Pld | T | G | FG | P |
|---|---|---|---|---|---|---|
| 2014–15 | Sydney Roosters | 11 | 3 | 0 | 0 | 12 |
| 2015–16 | Gold Coast Titans | 34 | 14 | 0 | 0 | 56 |
| 2017–18 | St. George Illawarra | 46 | 16 | 0 | 0 | 64 |
| 2019 | North Qld Cowboys | 5 | 1 | 0 | 0 | 4 |
| 2020 | Cronulla Sharks | 2 | 1 | 0 | 0 | 4 |
| 2022 | Leigh Centurions | 27 | 26 | 0 | 0 | 104 |
| 2023 | Leeds Rhinos | 20 | 2 | 0 | 0 | 8 |
| 2024–25 | Salford Red Devils | 34 | 17 | 0 | 0 | 68 |
| 2025(loan) | → Oldham | 2 | 1 | 0 | 0 | 4 |
| 2026 | St Helens | 13 | 3 | 0 | 0 | 12 |
| | Total | 194 | 84 | 0 | 0 | 336 |
Representative
| Years | Team | Pld | T | G | FG | P |
| 2013–25 | PNG Prime Minister's XIII | 4 | 5 | 0 | 0 | 20 |
| 2013– | Papua New Guinea | 23 | 13 | 0 | 0 | 52 |
| 2016–17 | World All Stars | 2 | 1 | 0 | 0 | 4 |
- Source: As of 22 November 2026

Nene Macdonald (born 11 May 1994) is a Papua New Guinean professional rugby league footballer who last played as a winger or centre for St Helens in the Super League, and Papua New Guinea at international level.

He previously played for the Leeds Rhinos and the Salford Red Devils in the Super League, Leigh Centurions in the Championship, Sydney Roosters, Gold Coast Titans, St George Illawarra Dragons, North Queensland Cowboys and the Cronulla-Sutherland Sharks in the National Rugby League, the Northern Pride RLFC and the Norths Devils in the Intrust Super Cup, the Wyong Roos and the Newtown Jets in the NSW Cup and the World All Stars at representative level.

== Background ==
Born in Port Moresby, Papua New Guinea, Macdonald moved to Queensland, Australia at a young age. He played his junior football for the Cairns Brothers, before being signed by the Gold Coast Titans.

== Club career ==
=== 2012 ===
In 2012, he joined the Sydney Roosters. He played for the Roosters' NYC team in 2012 and 2013.

=== 2014 ===
On 11 February 2014, Macdonald was selected in the Roosters' inaugural 2014 NRL Auckland Nines squad. In Round 11 of the 2014 NRL season, he made his NRL debut for the Roosters against the Canterbury-Bankstown Bulldogs on the wing and scored a try in the Roosters' 32-12 win at ANZ Stadium. He finished his debut year in the NRL having played 7 games and scoring 3 tries for the Roosters. On 2 September 2014, he was named on the wing in the 2014 NYC Team of the Year.

=== 2015 ===
On 31 January and 1 February, Macdonald again played for the Roosters' in the 2015 NRL Auckland Nines.

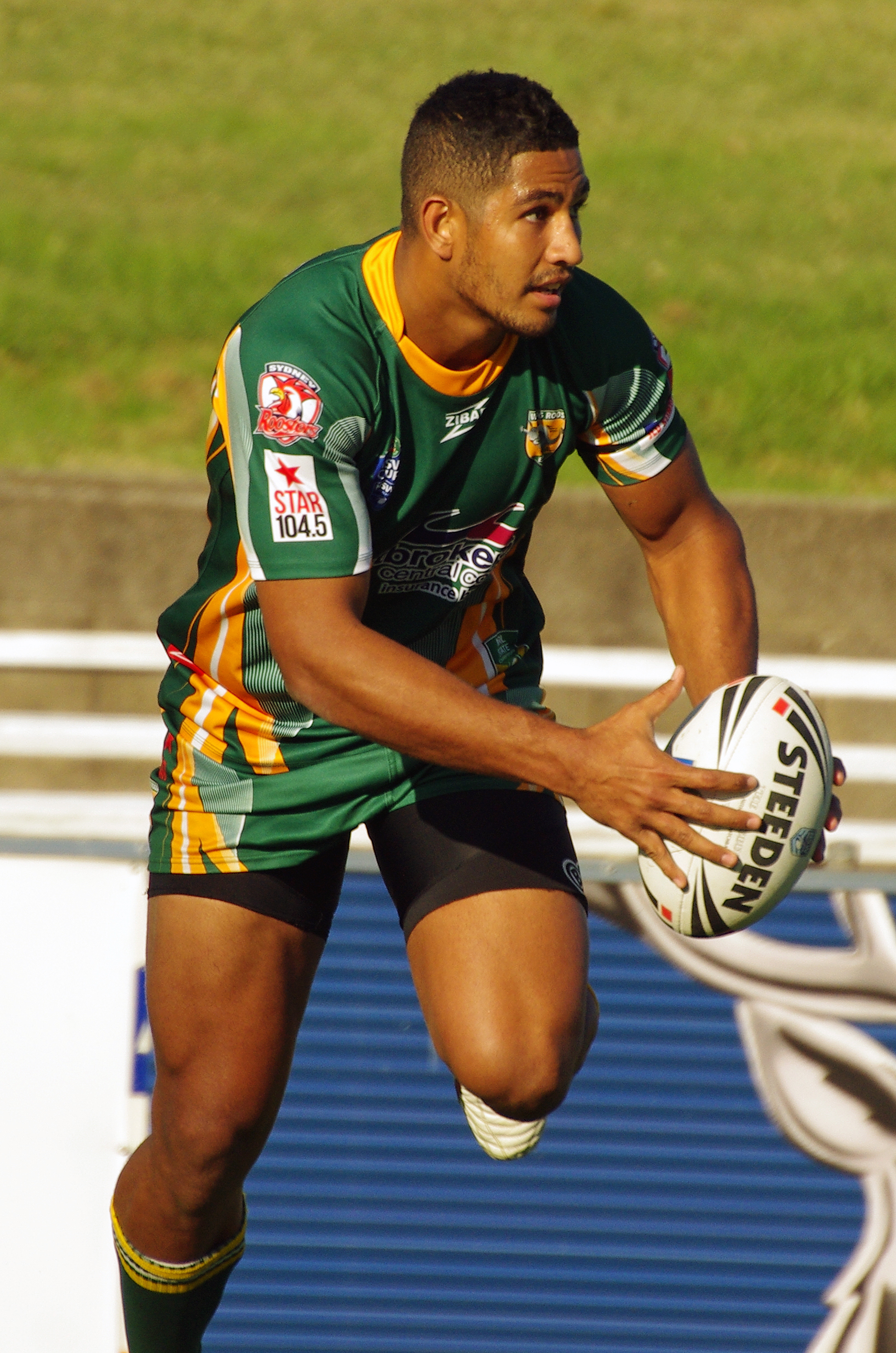
Macdonald playing for the Wyong Roos in 2015

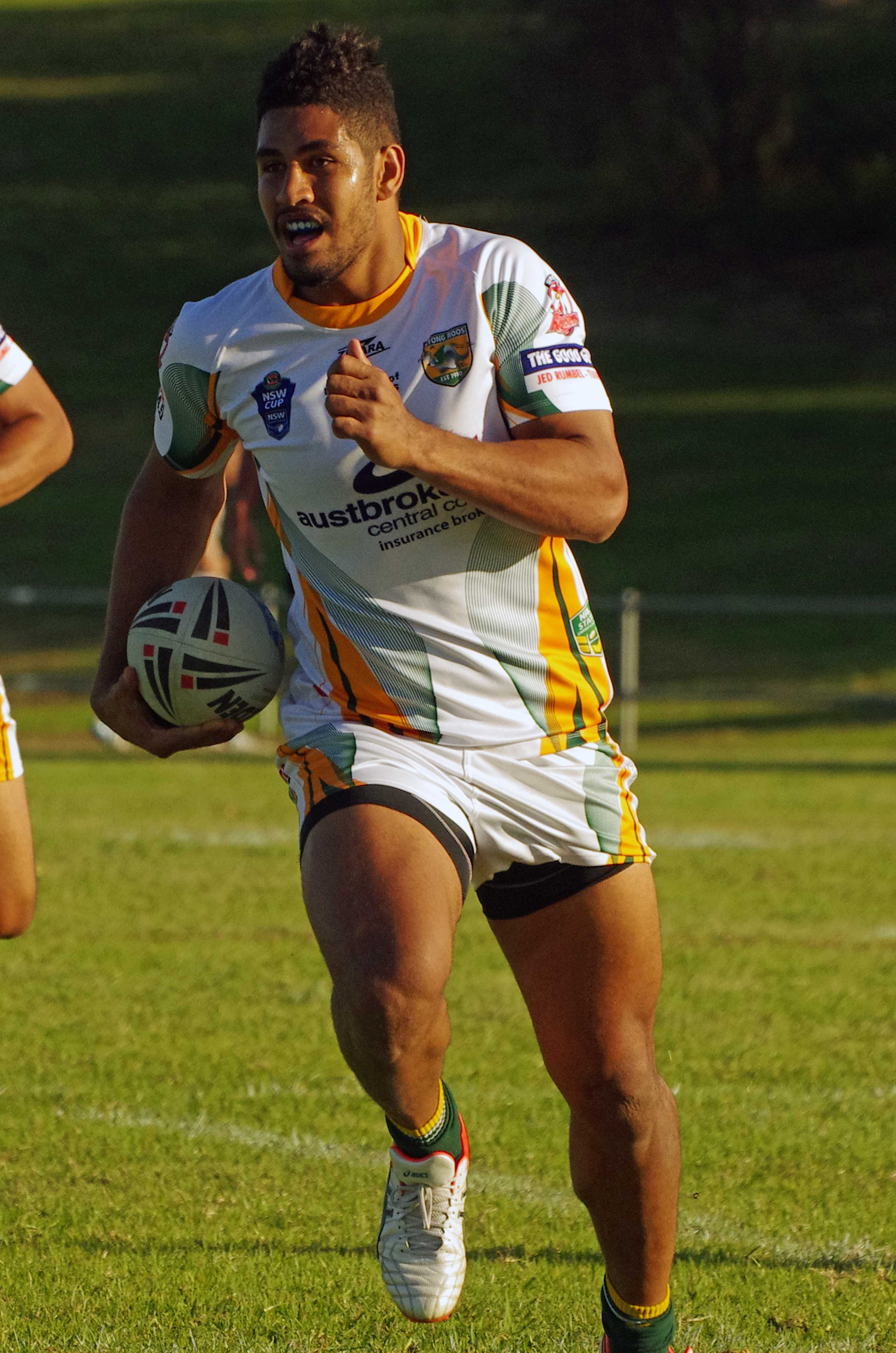
Macdonald playing for the Wyong Roos in 2015

On 16 June, he signed a 1 1/2-year contract with the Gold Coast Titans mid-season effective immediately. He made his club debut for the Titans in Round 15 against the New Zealand Warriors, playing at centre in the Titans' 36-14 loss at Cbus Super Stadium. In his next match in Round 16 against his former club the Sydney Roosters, he scored his first try for the Titans in their 20-10 loss at Central Coast Stadium. He finished off the 2015 season having played in 4 matches for the Roosters and 11 matches for the Titans, scoring 4 tries.

=== 2016 ===
In February, he played for the Titans in the 2016 NRL Auckland Nines. In August, he signed a 3-year contract with the St George Illawarra Dragons starting in 2017. He finished the 2016 season having played in 23 matches and scoring 10 tries in his last year with the Titans.

=== 2017 ===
In February 2017, Macdonald was named in the Dragons 2017 NRL Auckland Nines squad. In Round 1 of the 2017 NRL season, Macdonald made his club debut for the St George Illawarra Dragons against the Penrith Panthers, playing on the wing in the 42-10 win at Jubilee Oval.

=== 2018 ===
On 9 October, Macdonald signed a three-year contract with the North Queensland Cowboys starting in 2019.

=== 2019 ===
In March, Macdonald was dropped from a pre-season trial game against the Melbourne Storm for being late to training.

In round 1 of the 2019 NRL season, Macdonald made his debut for North Queensland, scoring a try in their 24–12 victory over his former club, the St George Illawarra Dragons. In round 5, he suffered a fracture and dislocation of his ankle in the club's 12–18 defeat by the Melbourne Storm.

On 20 June, he was involved in a traffic incident, in which a hired car leased in his name was found damaged and abandoned on Magnetic Island. On 5 July, he was released by North Queensland.

=== 2020 ===
On 11 June, Macdonald signed a contract to join Cronulla-Sutherland Sharks after twelve months out of the game. Macdonald made his debut for Cronulla-Sutherland in round 9 against Penrith and scored a try as Cronulla were beaten 56-24 at Kogarah Oval.

=== 2021 ===
Macdonald joined the Norths Devils and played four games for the Queensland Cup club, including their 16-10 grand final win over the Wynnum Manly Seagulls. On 5 November, he signed a train and trial deal with Brisbane worth $1000 a week.

On 29 November, it was announced that Macdonald had signed to play for Leigh in the Betfred Championship under Leigh's Papua New Guinean head coach Adrian Lam.

=== 2022 ===
In round 1 of the 2022 season, MacDonald scored a hat-trick on his club debut for Leigh in their 50-4 victory over Whitehaven. On 28 May, Macdonald played for Leigh in their 2022 RFL 1895 Cup final victory over Featherstone. On 10 July, Macdonald scored a hat-trick in Leigh's 66-0 victory over Workington Town. On 3 October 2022, Macdonald scored try in the Million Pound Game victory over Batley which saw Leigh promoted back to the Super League. On 17 November 2022, Macdonald joined Leeds Rhinos from Leigh for the 2023 season with a pre-season friendly being announced as part of the deal.

=== 2023 ===
In round 2 of the 2023 Super League season, Macdonald made his club debut for Leeds in their 22-18 loss against Hull F.C. Macdonald played a total of 19 games for Leeds in the 2023 Super League season as the club finished 8th on the table and missed the playoffs. On 16 October 2023 it was reported that he had signed a four-year deal to join Salford ahead of the 2024 season.

=== 2024 ===
In round 1 of the 2024 Super League season, Macdonald made his club debut for Salford against his former team Leeds. Leeds would win the match 22-16. At the end of the season, Macdonald was the sole Salford representative in the Super League Dream Team.

=== 2025 ===
On 4 April, as part of Salford's on-going financial turmoil, it was reported that he had signed for Oldham RLFC in the RFL Championship on short-term loan.

On 11 December, it was reported that he had signed for St Helens in the Super League on a two-year deal.

=== 2026 ===
On 7 February 2026, Macdonald made his club debut for St Helens in their 98-2 victory over Workington Town in the third round of the Challenge Cup.

On 27 October 2026, St Helens released a statement to say that he had been released by 'mutual consent'

== Representative career ==
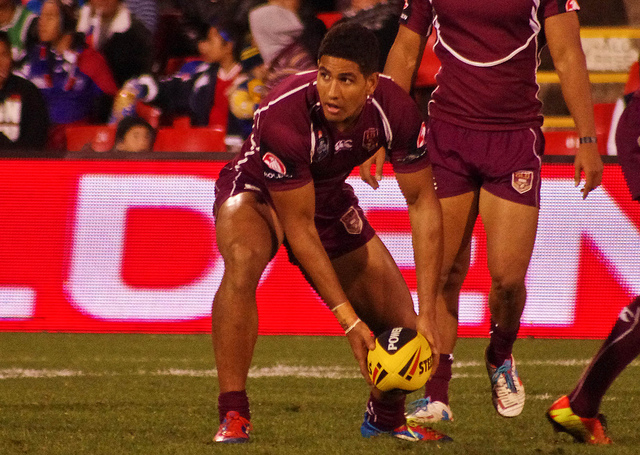
Macdonald playing for the Queensland under 20s side in 2013

In October 2005, Macdonald played for the Australian Schoolboys. In 2013 and 2014, he played for the Queensland Under-20s team.

On 12 January 2016, Macdonald was selected in the QAS Emerging Maroons squad. Macdonald was named on interchange bench for the 2016 World All Stars to play against the Indigenous All Stars in the NRL All Stars game, playing on the wing in his team's 12-8 win at Suncorp Stadium.

On 10 February 2017, Macdonald again played for the World All Stars against the Indigenous All Stars in the 2017 All Stars match, playing on the wing and scoring a try in the 34-8 loss at Hunter Stadium. Macdonald played for Papua New Guinea in the 2017 Rugby League World Cup.

== International career ==
In 2013, he made a try-scoring debut for Papua New Guinea against the Prime Minister's XIII team, and was selected in the Papua New Guinea squad for the 2013 World Cup. He played in 3 matches and scored three tries and a field goal in Papua New Guinea's 9-8 defeat by France.

In 2015, he played for Papua New Guinea against Fiji in the 2015 Melanesian Cup, playing on the wing in the Papua New Guinea's 22-10 loss at Cbus Super Stadium.

On 7 May 2016, he played for Papua New Guinea against Fiji in the 2016 Melanesian Cup, playing at centre and scoring a try in Papua New Guinea's 24-22 win at Parramatta Stadium.

In 2022, Macdonald was selected for the Papua New Guinea Squad at the delayed 2021 Rugby League World Cup in England. Macdonald started the group stage matches against Tonga, Wales, and Cook Islands, as well as the quarter-final loss to England, but failed to register any points.

Macdonald was ever-present in Papua New Guinea's successful 2023 Pacific Bowl campaign, scoring four tries against the Cook Islands in Port Moresby on the way to winning the Bowl.

In 2024, Macdonald played in the Kumuls' unbeaten run to the promotion final in the 2024 Rugby League Pacific Championships, playing at Fullback and scoring a try against in the tournament's opening match against Fiji in Suva, and registering a brace against the Cook Islands a fortnight later in Port Moresby.

On 12 October 2025 he played for the PNG Prime Minister's XIII in the 28-10 defeat to Australia's Prime Minister's XIII in Port Moresby.

== Statistics ==
=== NRL, Super League & RFL Championship ===
Statistics are correct to end of 2024 season

| Season | Team | Matches | T | G | GK % | F/G | Pts |
|---|---|---|---|---|---|---|---|
| 2014 | Sydney Roosters | 7 | 3 | 0 | — | 0 | 12 |
| 2015 | Sydney Roosters | 4 | 0 | 0 | — | 0 | 0 |
| 2015 | Gold Coast Titans | 11 | 4 | 0 | — | 0 | 16 |
| 2016 | Gold Coast Titans | 23 | 10 | 0 | — | 0 | 40 |
| 2017 | St George Illawarra Dragons | 23 | 6 | 0 | — | 0 | 24 |
| 2018 | St George Illawarra Dragons | 23 | 10 | 0 | — | 0 | 40 |
| 2019 | North Queensland Cowboys | 5 | 1 | 0 | — | 0 | 4 |
| 2020 | Cronulla-Sutherland Sharks | 1 | 1 | 0 | — | 0 | 4 |
| 2022 | Leigh Leopards | 27 | 27 | | | | 108 |
| 2023 | Leeds Rhinos | 20 | 2 | | | | 8 |
| 2024 | Salford Red Devils | 23 | 12 | | | | 48 |
| 2025 | Salford Red Devils | | | | | | |
| 2025 | → Oldham RLFC (loan) | 2 | 1 | 0 | 0 | 0 | 4 |
| 2026 | St Helens | 13 | 3 | 0 | 0 | | 12 |
| Career totals | | 194 | 84 | 0 | — | 0 | 336 |

=== International ===
| Season | Team | Matches | T | G | GK % | F/G | Pts |
|---|---|---|---|---|---|---|---|
| 2013 | Papua New Guinea | 3 | 1 | 0 | — | 0 | 4 |
| 2015 | Papua New Guinea | 1 | 0 | 0 | — | 0 | 0 |
| 2016 | Papua New Guinea | 1 | 1 | 0 | — | 0 | 4 |
| 2017 | Papua New Guinea | 4 | 3 | 0 | — | 0 | 12 |
| 2022 | Papua New Guinea | 4 | | | | | |
| 2023 | Papua New Guinea | 3 | | | | | |
| 2024 | Papua New Guinea | 3 | 3 | | | | 12 |
| 2025 | Papua New Guinea | | | | | | |
| 2026 | Papua New Guinea | | | | | | |
| Career totals | | 17 | 12 | 0 | — | 0 | 48 |
