= Cameron McInnes =

Australian rugby league footballer

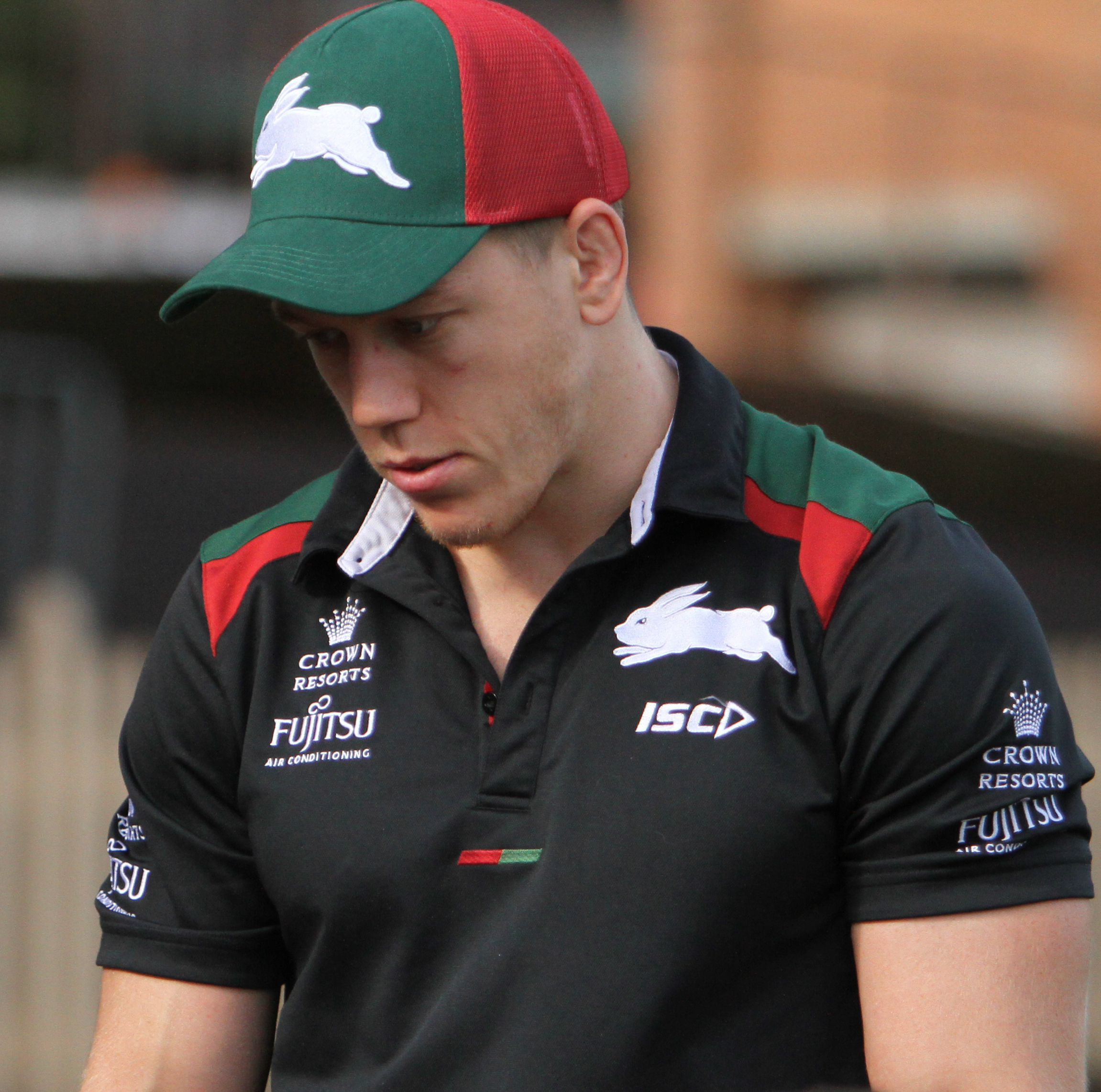

Personal information
- Born: 1 February 1994 (age 32) Sydney, New South Wales, Australia
- Height: 177 cm (5 ft 10 in)
- Weight: 91 kg (14 st 5 lb)

Playing information
- Position: Hooker, Lock
Club
Years	Team	Pld	T	G	FG	P
2014–16	South Sydney	39	6	0	0	24
2017–20	St. George Illawarra	91	11	0	0	44
2022–26	Cronulla Sharks	115	11	0	0	44
2027–	York Knights	0	0	0	0	0
	Total	245	28	0	0	112
Representative
Years	Team	Pld	T	G	FG	P
2017	NSW City	1	0	0	0	0
2023	Prime Minister's XIII	1	1	0	0	4
2024	New South Wales	1	0	0	0	0
- Source: As of 6 November 2026

Cameron McInnes (born 1 February 1994) is an Australian professional rugby league footballer who plays as a lock forward for the York Knights in the English Super League.

He previously played as a hooker for the South Sydney Rabbitohs, St George Illawarra Dragons and Cronulla Sharks in the National Rugby League. At representative level he has played for New South Wales in the State of Origin series and New South Wales City.

== Background ==
McInnes was born in Sydney, New South Wales, Australia.

He attended Marist College Pagewood and he topped the school in the 2011 HSC for Biology, Business Studies and English. He played his junior football for the Botany Rams before being signed by the South Sydney Rabbitohs.

== Career ==
=== Early career ===
He played for South Sydney's NYC team from 2012 to 2014 before moving on to the South Sydney New South Wales Cup team, North Sydney three rounds into 2014. He captained the NYC team in 2013 and 2014. In October 2013, McInnes re-signed with the Rabbitohs on a 2-year contract. At the end of 2013, McInnes won South Sydney's NYC Best and Fairest award, Player's Player award and was named on the interchange bench in the 2013 NYC Team of the Year.

=== 2014 ===
In Round 5 of the 2014 NRL season, McInnes made his NRL debut for South Sydney against the St. George Illawarra Dragons. In Round 11, McInnes scored his first ever NRL try (against the Cronulla-Sutherland Sharks), slicing through defenders 10m out to plant the ball the down.

=== 2015 ===
McInnes was selected twelve times in 2015, playing off the bench, at Hooker and even at times in the back-row. In Round 11, McInnes scored the winning try against the Parramatta Eels, latching onto a pass from fellow hooker, Issac Luke, before diving over the try-line. On 13 May 2015, McInnes re-signed with South Sydney on a two-year contract.

=== 2016 ===
The departure of Isaac Luke to the New-Zealand Warriors gave McInnes the starting role for the South Sydney club. In Round One he opened the scoring, diving under the posts five minutes into South Sydney's 42–10 win over the Sydney Roosters. In Round 5, McInnes was credited with a 'stellar' performance, creating all three tries for the South Sydney club. After scoring two solo tries from dummy half, he then put five-eighth, Cody Walker through a hole to score in Souths 12–16 win over the Manly-Warringah Sea Eagles.

As the season went on McInnes would switch between starting and interchange hooker, as him and South Sydney's alternate hooking option, Damien Cook fought for a starting position. By the end of the 2016 season, McInnes had played 19 games, scoring 4 tries with 1 try assist and an impressive 726 tackles. In September 2016, McInnes signed a two-year contract with the St. George Illawarra Dragons starting in 2017, after being released from the final year of his South Sydney contract following their signing of New South Wales State of Origin representative hooker Robbie Farah.

=== 2017 ===
In December 2017, McInnes signed a four-year deal to remain at St George Illawarra until the end of the 2021 season.

=== 2018 ===
In 2018, McInnes was part of the St. George Illawarra side which qualified for the finals and defeated Brisbane 48–18 in week one before being eliminated the following week by South Sydney 13–12.

=== 2019 ===
McInnes made a total of 23 appearances for St. George Illawarra in the 2019 NRL season as the club endured one of their worst seasons finishing in 15th place on the table just above the last placed Gold Coast. Before the season had started, St George Illawarra were expected to reach the finals and challenge for the premiership but only managed to win 7 games all year.

=== 2020 ===
On 19 February, it was announced that McInnes would miss the first 12 weeks of the 2020 NRL season after suffering an MCL injury at the pre-season NRL Nines tournament. Due to the rescheduling of the season due to the COVID-19 pandemic, he managed to return in round 3.

He made a total of 18 appearances for the club in the 2020 NRL season as the side finished a disappointing 13th on the table.

=== 2021 ===
On 2 February, McInnes signed with Cronulla-Sutherland for four years starting in 2022. On 12 February, McInnes suffered an anterior cruciate ligament (ACL) injury, ruling him out for the rest of the season and prematurely ending his career with the club.

=== 2022 ===
In round 2 of the 2022 NRL season, McInnes made his club debut for Cronulla in their 18-16 victory over Parramatta. McInnes played 25 games for Cronulla throughout the year as the club surprised many by finishing second on the table. McInnes played in both finals matches as Cronulla were eliminated in straight sets.

=== 2023 ===
In Cronulla's 0-28 loss to the Penrith Panthers in round 22 of the 2023 NRL season, McInnes - playing at lock forward - made 78 tackles, breaking the NRL-era record for most tackles made by a player in a single match previously held by Canberra's Shaun Fensom, who made 74 tackles against Canterbury-Bankstown in 2011. McInnes played a total of 23 games for Cronulla in the 2023 NRL season as Cronulla finished sixth on the table. McInnes played in the clubs 13-12 upset loss against the Sydney Roosters which ended their season.

=== 2024 ===
On 26 May, McInnes was selected by New South Wales ahead of the 2024 State of Origin series following his good form at club level for Cronulla. On 16 June, McInnes was not selected by New South Wales for game two after the fallout of the 38-10 loss in game one of the series. McInnes played 26 matches for Cronulla in the 2024 NRL season as the club finished 4th on the table and qualified for the finals. He played in all three of Cronulla's finals matches including their preliminary final loss against Penrith. On 16 December, the Sharks announced that McInnes had re-signed with the club until the end of the 2026 season.

=== 2025 ===
On 20 August it was announced that McInnes would be ruled out of the rest of the season after suffering a knee injury in Cronulla's round 24 win against the Gold Coast.

=== 2026 ===
On 31 August, the York Knights confirmed that they had signed McInnes on a three year deal. He played 19 matches for Cronulla in the 2026 NRL season as the club finished 5th on the table and qualified for the finals. His final game for the club was their semi-final loss to the Sydney Roosters.

== Statistics ==
Season	Team	Matches	T	G	GK %	F/G	Pts
2014	South Sydney	7	1	0	—	0	4
2015	South Sydney	13	1	0	—	0	4
2016	South Sydney	19	4	0	—	0	16
2017	St. George Illawarra	24	4	0	—	0	16
2018	St. George Illawarra	26	3	0	—	0	12
2019	St. George Illawarra	23	3	0	—	0	12
2020	St. George Illawarra	18	1	0	—	0	4
2022	Cronulla-Sutherland	25	2	0	—	0	8
2023	Cronulla-Sutherland	23	3				12
2024	Cronulla-Sutherland	26	2				8
2025	Cronulla-Sutherland	22	3				12
2026	Cronulla-Sutherland	3					
2027	York Knights						
Career totals		229	27	0	—	0	108

=== City vs Country ===
Season	Team	Matches	T	G	GK %	F/G	Pts
2017	NSW City	1	0	0	—	0	0
Career totals		1	0	0	—	0	0
