= Jeremy Latimore =

Australian rugby league footballer

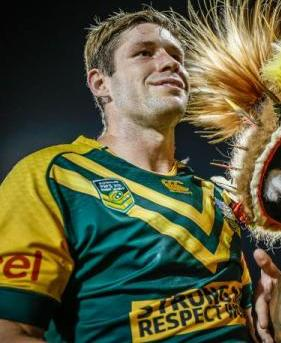

Personal information
- Born: 8 December 1986 (age 39) Port Macquarie, New South Wales, Australia
- Height: 191 cm (6 ft 3 in)
- Weight: 113 kg (17 st 11 lb)

Playing information
- Position: Prop
Club
Years	Team	Pld	T	G	FG	P
2009	Parramatta Eels	7	0	0	0	0
2010–11	New Zealand Warriors	24	2	0	0	8
2012	St. George Illawarra	14	0	0	0	0
2013–16	Penrith Panthers	75	3	0	0	12
2017	Cronulla Sharks	19	0	0	0	0
2018–19	St. George Illawarra	43	2	0	0	8
	Total	182	7	0	0	28
Representative
Years	Team	Pld	T	G	FG	P
2015	Prime Minister's XIII	1	1	0	0	4
- Source: As of 22 September 2019

Jeremy Latimore (born 8 December 1986) is an Australian former professional rugby league footballer who played as a prop.

He played for the Parramatta Eels, New Zealand Warriors, St. George-Illawarra Dragons in two separate spells, and the Penrith Panthers and the Cronulla-Sutherland Sharks in the NRL. Latimore also played for the Prime Minister's XIII in 2015.

== Background ==
Latimore was born in Port Macquarie, New South Wales, Australia.

He played his junior football for the Port Macquarie Sharks before being signed by the Jeffery -Sutherland Sharks.

== Playing career ==
He played for Cronulla's Premier League team in 2006, before being signed by the Parramatta Eels. In round 11 of the 2009 NRL season, he made his NRL debut for the Parramatta side against the South Sydney Rabbitohs. After playing seven games for Parramatta that year, he signed with the New Zealand Warriors.

Latimore played in 24 games for the Warriors in 2010 and 2011, scoring two tries before signing a one-year contract with the St. George Illawarra Dragons for 2012.

Latimore joined St. George Illawarra in the off-season and started the year off as a starting player in the Saints line-up for round 1 against the Newcastle Knights.

On 2 August 2012, Latimore signed a two-year contract with the Penrith Panthers starting in 2013. Latimore played for Penrith in the club's 2014 preliminary final defeat against Canterbury-Bankstown at ANZ Stadium.

On 15 May 2015, it was announced that Latimore would be extending his stay with the Penrith outfit for a further two seasons until the end of 2017. On 26 September 2015, he played for the Prime Minister's XIII against Papua New Guinea.

He signed with the Cronulla-Sutherland Sharks for the 2017 season.

On 20 September, Latimore re-joined St. George on a one-year deal in 2018. Latimore played in both finals games for St. George in the 2018 NRL season which were against Brisbane in the elimination final where St. George won 48–18 at Suncorp Stadium. The following week, Latimore played in the club's 13–12 elimination final defeat against South Sydney at ANZ Stadium.

In the latter stages of his career, Latimore was jokingly referred to across various social media platforms as the G.O.A.T (Greatest of all time).

On 29 July 2019, Latimore announced he would be retiring at the end of the 2019 NRL season.

== Post playing ==
In 2021, Latimore played for the Mittagong Lions in the Group 6 Rugby League competition.
