= Gareth Widdop =

GB & England international rugby league footballer

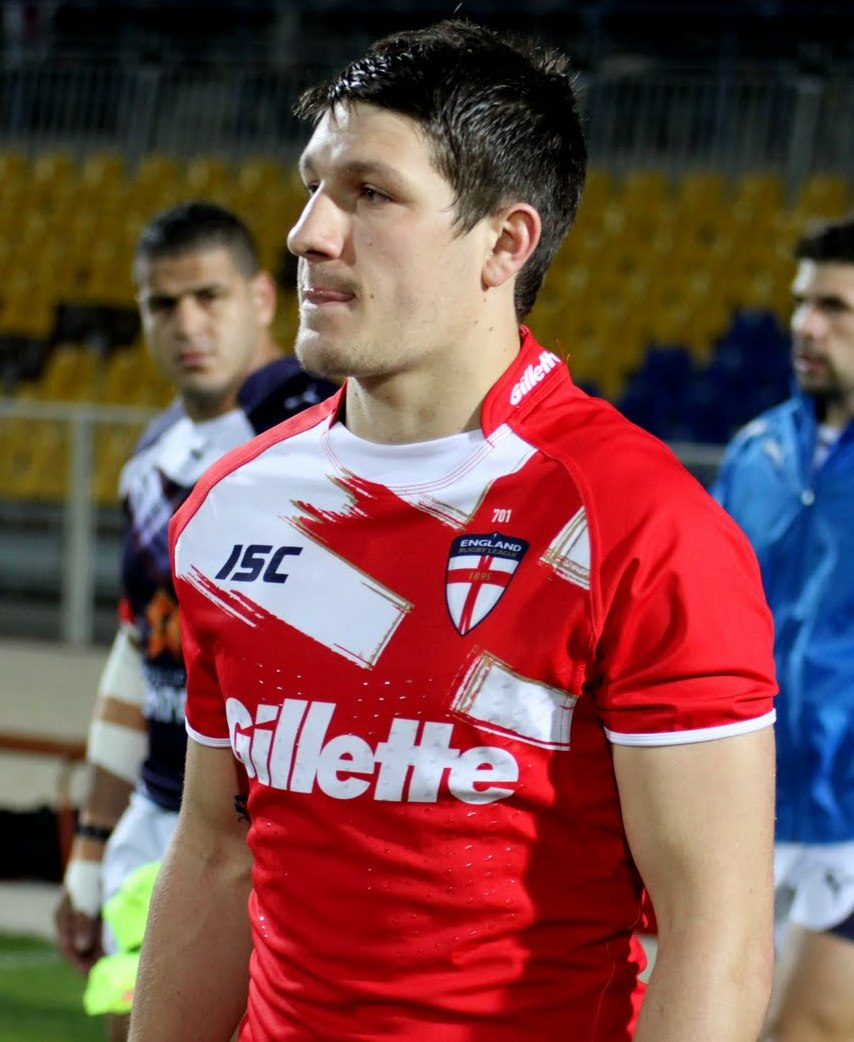

Personal information
- Full name: Gareth Edward Widdop
- Born: 12 March 1989 (age 37) Halifax, West Yorkshire, England
- Height: 6 ft 0 in (1.83 m)
- Weight: 14 st 2 lb (90 kg)

Playing information

Rugby league
- Position: Stand-off, Fullback, Scrum-half
Club
Years	Team	Pld	T	G	FG	P
2010–13	Melbourne Storm	70	10	25	1	91
2014–19	St George Illawarra	125	33	387	6	912
2020–22	Warrington Wolves	49	20	47	1	175
2023	Castleford Tigers	21	1	37	1	79
2024	Halifax Panthers	24	7	6	0	40
	Total	289	71	502	9	1297
Representative
Years	Team	Pld	T	G	FG	P
2010	NSW Residents	1	1	0	0	4
2010–18	England	29	7	71	1	171
2016	World All Stars	1	0	0	0	0
2019	Great Britain	4	0	6	0	12

Rugby union
- Position: Fullback, Centre
Club
Years	Team	Pld	T	G	FG	P
2025–Present	Huddersfield
- Source: As of 22 November 2026

Gareth Edward Widdop (born 12 March 1989) is an English former professional rugby league footballer who played as a stand-off or fullback for the Halifax Panthers in the RFL Championship. He is now assistant coach for Huddersfield RUFC.

Widdop played at club level for the Melbourne Storm and the St. George Illawarra Dragons in the National Rugby League, and for the Warrington Wolves and the Castleford Tigers in the Super League. He won the 2012 NRL Grand Final with Melbourne and has played for the World All Stars.

He made 29 representative appearances for England, ranking as the side's second-highest points scorer, and made 4 appearances for Great Britain.

== Early life ==
Born and brought up in Halifax, Yorkshire, Widdop played his junior rugby for King Cross before moving to Melbourne, Australia with his family at the age of 17 where he was educated at Bayside Secondary College.

As a teenager, Widdop went to the 2006 NRL Grand Final, and continued to play in the Melbourne Rugby League for Altona Roosters under his father Gary. He was introduced to the Storm by Dean Lance, and was taken into the Storms Academy U18 program by Paul Bramley the High Performance Manager at the time, he went on to represent Victoria Under 18s team, and the Australian Affiliated U18 Schoolboys and he eventually signed for Melbourne Storm's Under 20s team.

On 2 September 2009, Widdop was named on the interchange bench in the 2009 NYC Team of the Year. In the 2009 NYC Grand Final against the Wests Tigers NYC Team, Widdop scored the match winning try and goal in the 24–22 win. Widdop was named the Storms' NYC player of the year in 2009.

== Club career ==
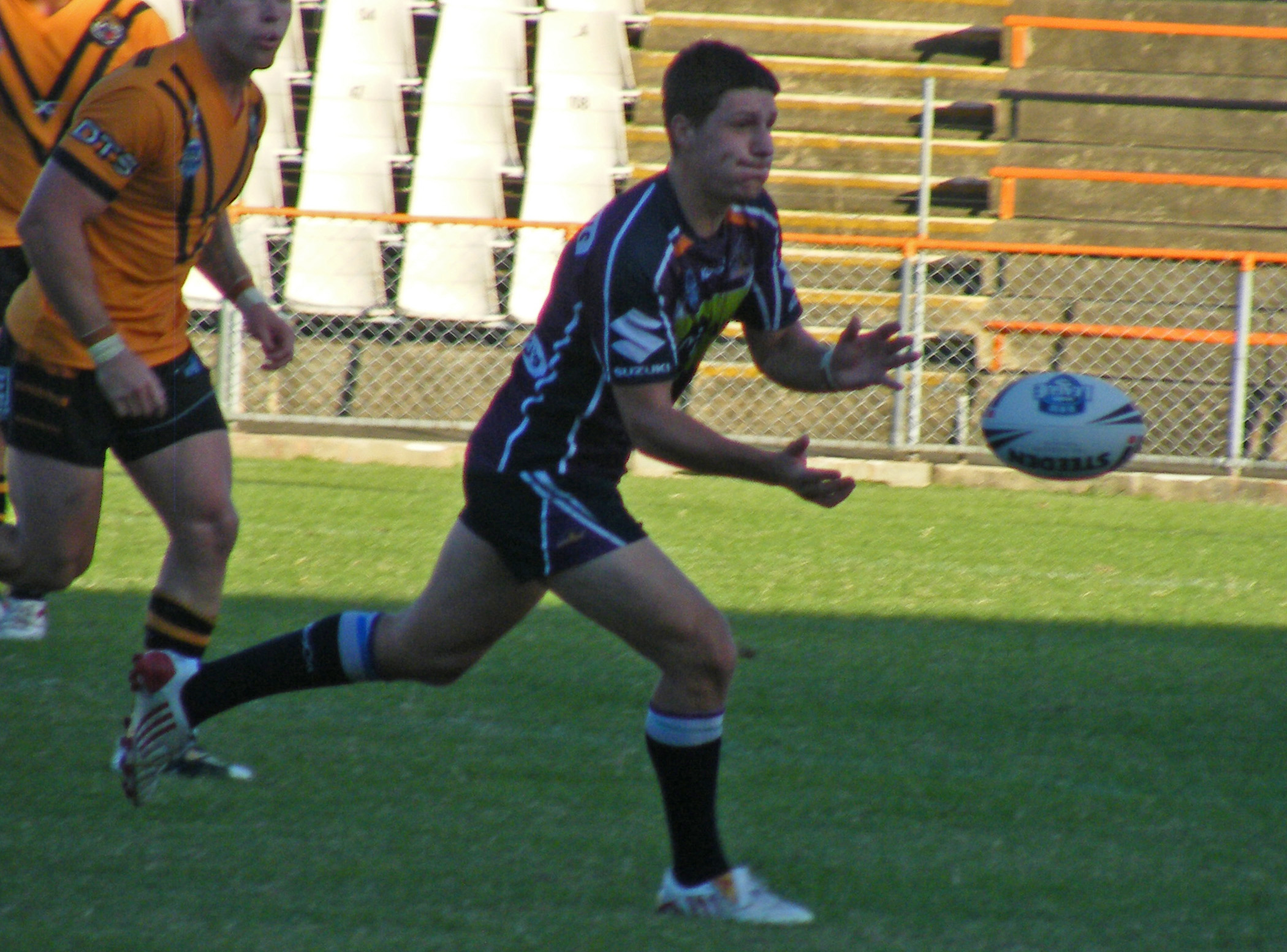
Widdop playing for the Storm in the 2010 NSW Cup

=== Melbourne Storm ===
In 2010, Widdop's first season in the first team at the Melbourne Storm, he was named in Melbournes' 23-man touring party in preparation for the 2010 World Club Challenge against Leeds Rhinos but was not chosen to play but did pick up the man of the match award in their warm up game against the Harlequins.

Widdop made his NRL debut in Round 7 of the 2010 NRL season against the Warriors where he played centre in the Storms' 40–6 win at Etihad Stadium. This was notably the first match which the Storm played following news of their salary cap scandal, which saw the club stripped of three minor premierships, two premierships and the right to accrue any competition points in 2010. In Round 12 against the Canterbury-Bankstown Bulldogs, Widdop made his first appearance at fullback in place of the rested Billy Slater, scoring a try and kicking 3 conversions in the 23–12 win at AAMI Park. Widdop was put back in the centres for his third and final appearance in 2010 for the Storm, the Round 25 clash against the Wests Tigers.

On 9 September 2010, Widdop was named at five-eighth in the 2010 NSW Cup Team of the Year. Widdop finished his début year in the NRL with him playing in 3 matches, scoring 1 try and kicking 3 goals for the Melbourne Storm in the 2010 NRL season.

On 14 May 2011, Widdop re-signed with the Storm until the end of the 2013 season. Widdop appeared in 25 matches, scoring 2 tries, kicking 7 goals and kicking 1 field goal for the Melbourne Storm in the 2011 NRL season.

On 30 September 2012, in the Storm's 2012 NRL Grand Final against the Canterbury-Bankstown Bulldogs, Widdop played at five-eighth in the Storm's 14–4 victory. Widdop finished the 2012 NRL season for the Storm playing in 25 matches, scoring 4 tries, and kicking 12 goals.

Widdop started the 2013 season as five-eighth in the Melbourne Storm's 18–14 win over Super League champions Leeds Rhinos in the 2013 World Club Challenge at Headingley Stadium. On 19 April 2013, it was announced that Widdop had signed a four-year contract with the St. George Illawarra Dragons starting in 2014. In Round 15 against Gold Coast Titans, Widdop suffered a dislocated hip in an awkward tackle in the Storms' 18–12 loss at Cbus Super Stadium. Widdop later returned in the Week 1 finals match against the South Sydney Rabbitohs in the Storms' 20–10 loss at ANZ Stadium. Widdop finished his last year with the Melbourne Storm with him playing in 16 matches, scoring 3 tries and kicking 3 goals in the 2013 NRL season.

=== St. George Illawarra Dragons ===
In Round 1 of the 2014 NRL season, Widdop made his club début for the St George Illawarra Dragons against the Wests Tigers, Widdop proved his worth having a hand in four of the team's seven tries and kicking eight from eight goals in the Dragons 44–24 win at ANZ Stadium. The signing of Benji Marshall to the Dragons part way through the season meant a new halves partner for Widdop. In Round 16, against his former club the Melbourne Storm, Widdop scored his first club try for the Dragons in the 24–12 win at WIN Stadium. Widdop finished off his first year with the St George Illawarra Dragons as the club's highest point scorer with 137 points from 3 tries, 61 goals and 3 field goals, and played in all of the Dragons 24 matches.

Widdop featured in the World Club Series against Warrington Wolves where he kicked 3 goals in the 18–12 win at Halliwell Jones Stadium. In Round 6, against the Canterbury-Bankstown Bulldogs, Widdop played his 100th NRL match in the Dragons 31–6 win at ANZ Stadium. In the Dragons week 1 elimination final match against the Canterbury-Bankstown Bulldogs, Widdop became the hero and the villain in the tight match, Widdop was the hero in the 80th minute when he kicked a penalty goal after Bulldogs second-rower Shaun Lane scored a try in the 78th minute but when the ball came off Lane from an offside position from a short kickoff from the Dragons, the Dragons were awarded the penalty and Widdop levelled the match at 10–10 at full-time, sending the match into extra time. Widdop became the villain after his kick out on the full, in an attempt to nail a 40/20, which later saw Bulldogs' Josh Reynolds kick the match-winning field goal four tackles later in the 84th minute ending the Dragons season 11–10 at ANZ Stadium. Widdop finished the 2015 NRL season as the club's highest tryscorer and point scorer with him scoring 182 points in 24 matches, from 9 tries and 73 goals.

On 13 February 2016, Widdop played for the World All Stars against the Indigenous All Stars in the 2016 All Stars match, playing at five-eighth in the 12–8 win at Suncorp Stadium.

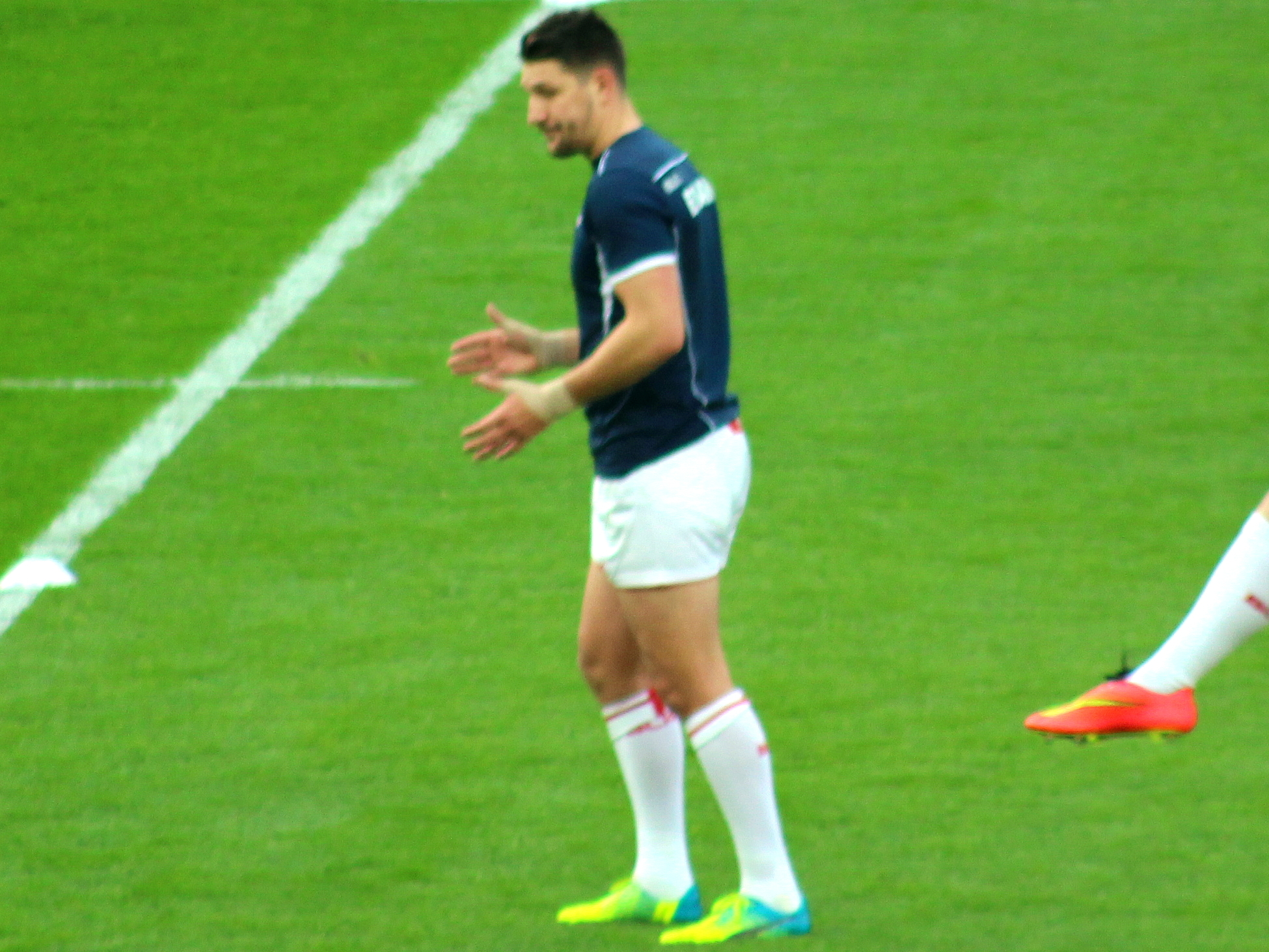
Widdop playing for England in 2016

The Dragons found form in the early 2017 season with many good performances from Widdop. He received Dally M five-eighth of the year.

Widdop made 22 appearances for St George in 2018 as the club qualified for the finals for the first time since 2015 finishing 7th at the end of the regular season although the saints lead the competition earlier on in the year. In week one of the finals series, Widdop dislocated his shoulder for the second time in the season as St George romped to a shock 48–18 victory against Brisbane at Suncorp Stadium. Widdop had only just returned to the squad after dislocating the same shoulder a month prior against Parramatta. Widdop was subsequently ruled out of the following weeks elimination final against South Sydney.

In round 3 against the Brisbane Broncos, Widdop dislocated his right shoulder in the 25–24 victory. Scans later confirmed that Widdop would need a second shoulder reconstruction and the player would miss 4–5 months.

In round 25 against the Gold Coast, Widdop kicked 4 goals as St George won the match 24–16. In the process, Widdop reached 1000 NRL points in his final game for the club. St George ended the season in 15th position on the table which was one of the worst seasons in the club's history.

=== Warrington Wolves ===
Widdop made his début at scrum-half in the 18–8 away defeat against Wakefield Trinity on 16 February 2020.

In round 2 of the 2021 Super League season, Widdop scored two tries in a 44–12 victory over Leigh. In round 7, he scored a hat-trick in Warrington's 38–12 victory over Castleford. The following week, he scored two tries in a 62–18 victory over Salford. Widdop played a total of 20 games for Warrington including their shock 19-0 elimination playoff loss to Hull Kingston Rovers.

Widdop played a total of 15 games for Warrington in the 2022 Super League season as the club endured a difficult campaign finishing 11th.

=== Castleford Tigers ===
On 6 October 2022, it was confirmed that Widdop had signed for the Castleford Tigers on a two-year deal.

Widdop played 21 games for Castleford in the Super League XXVIII season as the club finished 11th on the table narrowly avoiding relegation.

On 18 October 2023, the Tigers announced that Widdop would depart the club by mutual consent, with Widdop later confirming his retirement from professional rugby league.

=== Halifax Panthers ===
On 23 December 2023, it was reported that Widdop would come out of retirement and sign for his hometown club Halifax to play in the RFL Championship in 2024.

=== 2025 ===
Widdop joined Huddersfield RUFC for the second half of season 2025 - where he played fullback and inside centre.

== International career ==
On 1 June 2010, Widdop received a surprise call-up into new England coach Steve McNamara's 19-man squad for the match against France on 12 June 2010. Widdop featured at fullback and scored a try with his first touch of the ball, he also kicked 2 goals when Kevin Sinfield was substituted in England's 60–6 win.

In mid-September, Widdop was once again called up to the England squad for the Four Nations, he started at fullback in an 18-all draw in the warm up match against New Zealand Māori in which he kicked 3 goals at Mt Smart Stadium. Widdop was once again on the scoresheet as England lost their opening game 24–10 against reigning world champions New Zealand, scoring a try and kicking a goal in the 24–10 loss at Westpac Stadium. Widdop was not selected for the game against Australia but was on the interchange bench in the final game against Papua New Guinea where he came on at centre to kick a goal in the 36–10 victory at Eden Park.

In the opening match of the 2011 Four Nations, Widdop was named on the interchange bench for England against Wales where he scored a try with the final play of the game in the 42–4 win at Leigh Sports Village. Widdop featured in England's final match against Australia on the interchange bench in a 30–8 loss at Elland Road. Widdop played in all 4 matches and scored a try in the tournament.

Widdop was selected to represent England from the interchange bench against Italy where he came on and kicked a goal in the 15–14 loss. Widdop featured in 3 matches and kicked a goal for England in the 2013 Rugby League World Cup.

Widdop was selected in England's 2014 Four Nations squad. Widdop featured against Samoa, Australia and New Zealand in the group stages. Widdop scored in all three matches with six, two and one goals respectively.

Widdop played in all 3 Test matches against New Zealand at stand off and kicked 10 goals in England's 2-1 Baskerville Shield series win.

At the conclusion of the club season, Gareth was selected for England for their test match against France and test series against New Zealand. In the test match against France, Widdop kicked 12 goals in a record 84–4 rout win of the 'Les Tricolores'.

In October, Widdop was selected in the England squad for the 2016 Four Nations. Before the tournament, England played a test match against France which saw Widdop tally his 100th test point in England's 40–6 win.

In October 2017 he was selected in the England squad for the 2017 Rugby League World Cup.

He was selected in England 9s squad for the 2019 Rugby League World Cup 9s.

He was selected in squad for the 2019 Great Britain Lions tour of the Southern Hemisphere. He made his Great Britain test debut in the defeat by Tonga.

== Statistics ==
Year	Team	Games	Tries	Goals	FGs	Pts
2010	Melbourne Storm	3	1	4		10
2011	Melbourne Storm	25	2	7	1	23
2012	Melbourne Storm	26	4	12		40
2013	Melbourne Storm	16	3	3		18
2014	St. George Illawarra Dragons	24	3	61	3	137
2015	St. George Illawarra Dragons	24	9	73		182
2016	St. George Illawarra Dragons	24	6	54	1	133
2017	St. George Illawarra Dragons	21	10	75	1	191
2018	St. George Illawarra Dragons	22	4	94	1	204
2019	St. George Illawarra Dragons	10	1	30		64
2020	Warrington Wolves	14	5	10	1	41
2021	Warrington Wolves	20	10	31		102
2022	Warrington Wolves	15	5	6		32
2023	Castleford Tigers	21	1	37	1	79
2024	Halifax Panthers					
	Totals	265	64	496	9	1257

== Honours ==
=== Melbourne ===
- NRLPremiership:

- Winner: 2012

- NRL Minor Premiers:

- Winner: 2011

- World Club Challenge:

- Winner: 2013
