= 2017 Brisbane Broncos season =

Coordinates: 27°27′53″S 153°0′34″E

- NRL rank: 3rd
- Play-off result: Lost Preliminary Final, (Melbourne Storm, 0–30)
- NRL Auckland Nines: Lost Quarter Final, (Sydney Roosters, 14–15)
- World Club Series: Lost Game 1, (Warrington Wolves, 18-27)
- 2017 record: Wins: 18; losses: 11
- Points scored: For: 597; against: 433

Team information
- CEO: Paul White
- Head Coach: Wayne Bennett
- Captain: Darius Boyd
- Stadium: Suncorp Stadium
- Avg. attendance: 31,394
- Agg. attendance: 376,730
- High attendance: 47,703 (North Queensland Cowboys, 10 March)
- Low attendance: 21,197 (Wests Tigers, 19 May)

Top scorers
- Tries: James Roberts (18)
- Goals: Jordan Kahu (74)
- Points: Jordan Kahu (187)
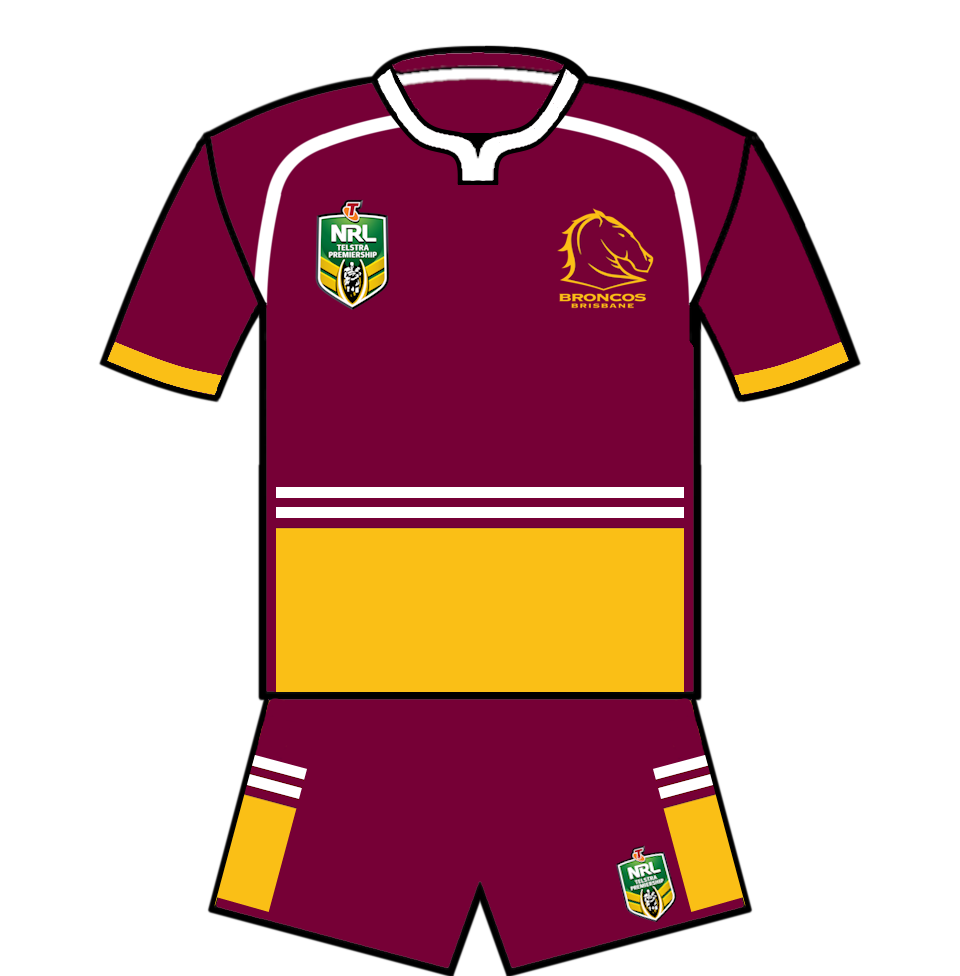
Home colours
← 2016	List of seasons	2018 →

The 2017 Brisbane Broncos season is the 30th in the Australian rugby league club's history. The team is based in Brisbane, Queensland, Australia. Coached by Wayne Bennett, and captained by Darius Boyd, they compete in the NRL's 2017 Telstra Premiership. Prior to the start of the Premiership season, the Broncos competed in the 2017 NRL Auckland Nines, finishing first in their pool, but lost the Quarter-Final.

== Squad information ==
As of 22 September 2017

Cap.	Nat.	Player	Position	First Broncos game	Previous First Grade RL club
128	(Australia)	Sam Thaiday	Second-row	2003	—N/a
141	(Australia)	Darius Boyd (c)	Fullback	2006	(Australia) Newcastle Knights
163	(Australia)	Andrew McCullough	Hooker	2008	—N/a
172	(Cook Islands)	Alex Glenn	Second-row	2009	—N/a
174	(Australia)	Josh McGuire	Lock	2009	—N/a
178	(Australia)	Ben Hunt	Halfback	2009	—N/a
182	(Australia)	Matt Gillett	Second-row	2010	—N/a
183	(Australia)	Mitchell Dodds	Prop	2010	(England) Warrington Wolves
199	(New Zealand)	Jordan Kahu	Wing	2013	—N/a
201	(Australia)	Corey Oates	Wing	2013	—N/a
208	(Cook Islands)	Francis Molo	Prop	2014	—N/a
209	(Samoa)	Anthony Milford	Five-eighth	2015	(Australia) Canberra Raiders
210	(New Zealand)	Adam Blair (vc)	Prop	2015	(Australia) Wests Tigers
212	(Tonga)	Joe Ofahengaue	Prop	2015	—N/a
213	(New Zealand)	Kodi Nikorima	Halfback	2015	—N/a
215	(Australia)	Joe Boyce	Lock	2015	—N/a
218	(Australia)	James Roberts	Centre	2016	(Australia) Gold Coast Titans
220	(Samoa)	Herman Ese'ese	Prop	2016	(Australia) Canterbury-Bankstown Bulldogs
221	(Australia)	Travis Waddell	Hooker	2016	(Australia) Newcastle Knights
222	(Australia)	Jai Arrow	Lock	2016	—N/a
223	(Australia)	Jaydn Su'A	Second-row	2016	—N/a
224	(Tonga)	Tevita Pangai Jnr	Prop	2016	—N/a
225	(Australia)	Tom Opacic	Centre	2016	—N/a
226	(Australia)	Jonus Pearson	Wing	2016	—N/a
227	(Samoa)	Tautau Moga	Centre	2017	(Australia) North Queensland Cowboys
228	(Fiji)	Korbin Sims	Prop	2017	(Australia) Newcastle Knights
229	(New Zealand)	Benji Marshall	Five-eighth	2017	(Australia) St. George Illawarra Dragons
230	(Papua New Guinea)	David Mead	Wing	2017	(Australia) Gold Coast Titans
231	(Australia)	George Fai	Prop	2017	—N/a
232	(New Zealand)	Jamayne Isaako	Fullback	2017	—N/a
–	(Australia)	Alex Barr	Second-row	Yet to debut	—N/a
–	(Australia)	Mitch Cronin	Hooker	Yet to debut	—N/a
–	(Australia)	Salesi Funaki	Second-row	Yet to debut	—N/a
–	(Australia)	Sam Lavea	Prop	Yet to debut	—N/a
–	(New Zealand)	Matiu Love-Henry	Second-row	Yet to debut	—N/a
–	(Australia)	Todd Murphy	Halfback	Yet to debut	—N/a
–	(Tonga)	Mosese Pangai	Centre	Yet to debut	—N/a
–	(Australia)	Aaron Rockley	Prop	Yet to debut	—N/a
–	(Australia)	Sam Scarlett	Halfback	Yet to debut	—N/a
–	(Australia)	Marion Seve	Centre	Yet to debut	—N/a
–	(Australia)	Gehamat Shibasaki	Centre	Yet to debut	—N/a
–	(New Zealand)	Nikau Terupe	Wing	Yet to debut	—N/a

== Squad changes ==
=== Transfers in ===
Date	Position	Player	From	Year/s	Ref.
3 August 2016	Centre	Mosese Pangai	Townsville Blackhawks	2 Years	
10 September 2016	Wing	David Mead	Gold Coast Titans	1 Year	
24 October 2016	Centre	Tautau Moga	North Queensland Cowboys	2 Years	
26 October 2016	Prop	Mitchell Dodds	Warrington Wolves	1 Year	
21 October 2016	Halfback	Benji Marshall	St. George Illawarra Dragons	1 Year	
23 January 2017	Prop	Korbin Sims	Newcastle Knights	2 Years	

=== Transfers out ===
Date	Position	Player	To	Year/s	Ref.
13 June 2016	Wing	Greg Eden	Castleford Tigers	2 Years	
20 June 2016	Lock	Corey Parker	Retirement	—N/a	
21 July 2016	Prop	Jarrod Wallace	Gold Coast Titans	3 Years	
1 September 2016	Wing	Lachlan Maranta	Queensland Reds	2 Years	
7 September 2016	Centre	Jack Reed	Retirement	—N/a	
4 October 2016	Centre	Aaron Whitchurch	Redcliffe Dolphins	1 Year	
5 October 2016	Halfback	Darren Nicholls	Penrith Panthers	1 Year	
24 October 2016	Fullback	Carlin Anderson	Townsville Blackhawks	1 Year	

== Ladder ==
2017 NRL season
Pos	Team	Pld	W	D	L	B	PF	PA	PD	Pts
1	Melbourne Storm (P)	24	20	0	4	2	633	336	+297	44
2	Sydney Roosters	24	17	0	7	2	500	428	+72	38
3	Brisbane Broncos	24	16	0	8	2	597	433	+164	36
4	Parramatta Eels	24	16	0	8	2	496	457	+39	36
5	Cronulla-Sutherland Sharks	24	15	0	9	2	476	407	+69	34
6	Manly-Warringah Sea Eagles	24	14	0	10	2	552	512	+40	32
7	Penrith Panthers	24	13	0	11	2	504	459	+45	30
8	North Queensland Cowboys	24	13	0	11	2	467	443	+24	30
9	St. George Illawarra Dragons	24	12	0	12	2	533	450	+83	28
10	Canberra Raiders	24	11	0	13	2	558	497	+61	26
11	Canterbury-Bankstown Bulldogs	24	10	0	14	2	360	455	−95	24
12	South Sydney Rabbitohs	24	9	0	15	2	464	564	−100	22
13	New Zealand Warriors	24	7	0	17	2	444	575	−131	18
14	Wests Tigers	24	7	0	17	2	413	571	−158	18
15	Gold Coast Titans	24	7	0	17	2	448	638	−190	18
16	Newcastle Knights	24	5	0	19	2	428	648	−220	14

== Fixtures ==
=== Pre-season ===
Date	Opponent	Venue	Score	Tries	Goals
Saturday, 4 February	Cronulla Sharks	Dolphin Oval	30 – 12 (subscription required)	Pangai Jr., Isaako, Ese’ese, Glenn, Ofahengaue	Isaako (5/5)
Legend: Win Loss Draw

==== NRL Auckland Nines ====
The NRL Auckland Nines is a pre-season rugby league nines competition featuring all 16 NRL clubs. The 2017 competition was played over two days on 4 and 5 February at Eden Park. The Broncos featured in the Rangitoto pool and played the Knights, Tigers and Storm.

Rangitoto Pool
Team	Pld	W	D	L	PF	PA	PD	Pts
Brisbane Broncos	3	2	0	1	50	29	+21	4
Melbourne Storm	3	2	0	1	38	34	+4	4
Wests Tigers	3	1	0	2	33	43	−10	2
Newcastle Knights	3	1	0	2	36	51	−15	2

Date	Time (Local)	Round	Opponent	Venue	Score	Tries	Goals
Saturday, 4 February	2:15pm	Round 1	Melbourne Storm	Eden Park	18 – 4	Kahu (2), Gillett, Pearson	Marshall (1/1), Kahu (0/2), Milford (0/1)
Saturday, 4 February	5:45pm	Round 2	Newcastle Knights	Eden Park	21 – 8	Kahu (3), Love-Henry	Kahu (2/4)
Sunday, 5 February	12:15pm	Round 3	Wests Tigers	Eden Park	11 – 17	Boyd, Oates	McCullough (1/1), Kahu (0/1)
Legend: Win Loss Draw

===== Finals =====
Quarter-finals
Penrith Panthers	16
Manly Sea Eagles	12
Parramatta Eels	14
Gold Coast Titans	0
Brisbane Broncos	14
Sydney Roosters	15
North Queensland Cowboys	12
Melbourne Storm	25

Semi-finals
Penrith Panthers	13
Parramatta Eels	0
Sydney Roosters	21
Melbourne Storm	16

Final
Penrith Panthers	8
Sydney Roosters	10

Date	Time (Local)	Round	Opponent	Venue	Score	Tries	Goals
Saturday, 5 February	3:05pm	Quarter-Final	Sydney Roosters	Eden Park	14 – 15	Kahu, Cronin, Lavea	Kahu (1/1), Boyd (0/1)
Legend: Win Loss Draw

==== World Club Series ====
Date	Opponent	Venue	Score	Tries	Goals	Attendance
Saturday, 18 February	Warrington Wolves	Halliwell Jones Stadium	27 – 18	Oates, Roberts, Mead	Kahu (3/3)	12,082
Legend: Win Loss Draw

=== Regular season ===
Date	Round	Opponent	Venue	Score	Tries	Goals	Attendance	Ref(s)
Thursday, 2 March	Round 1	Cronulla-Sutherland Sharks	Southern Cross Group Stadium	18 – 26	Kahu, Milford, Oates, Roberts	Kahu (5/5)	11,493	
Friday, 10 March	Round 2	North Queensland Cowboys	Suncorp Stadium	20 – 21 (Golden Point)	Boyd, Kahu, Roberts	Anthony Milford (4/5), Kahu (0/1)	47,703	
Thursday, 16 March	Round 3	Melbourne Storm	AAMI Park	14 – 12	Hunt, Roberts	Kahu (2/2)	16,334	
Friday, 24 March	Round 4	Canberra Raiders	Suncorp Stadium	13 – 12	Boyd, McCullough	Kahu (2/3) & (FG)	29,370	
Thursday, 30 March	Round 5	Canterbury-Bankstown Bulldogs	ANZ Stadium	10 – 7	Thaiday	Kahu (1/1) & (FG)	7,412	
Thursday, 6 April	Round 6	Sydney Roosters	Suncorp Stadium	32 – 8	Mead, McCullough, Roberts, Sims, Thaiday	Kahu (6/7)	30,376	
Friday, 14 April	Round 7	Gold Coast Titans	Suncorp Stadium	24 – 22	Roberts (3), Milford, Nikorima	Kahu (2/4), Milford (0/1)	34,592	
Friday, 21 April	Round 8	South Sydney Rabbitohs	ANZ Stadium	24 – 25	Oates (2), Moga, Sims	Milford (4/5) & (FG)	11,803	
Thursday, 27 April	Round 9	Penrith Panthers	Suncorp Stadium	32 – 18	Gillett, Kahu, Moga, Nikorima, Roberts, Sims	Kahu (4/6)	21,464	
Saturday, 13 May	Round 10	Manly-Warringah Sea Eagles	Suncorp Stadium	14 – 24	Oates (2), Nikorima, Milford	Kahu (4/4)	44,127	
Friday, 19 May	Round 11	Wests Tigers	Suncorp Stadium	36 – 0	Glenn, Kahu, Milford, Moga, Nikorima, Sims	Kahu (6/6)	21,197	
Saturday, 27 May	Round 12	New Zealand Warriors	Mt Smart Stadium	28 – 10	Roberts (2)	Kahu (1/2)	13,826	
Saturday, 3 June	Round 13	Sydney Roosters	Allianz Stadium	16 – 18	Marshall, Moga, Oates	Kahu(2/3)	12,236	
Friday, 9 June	Round 14	South Sydney Rabbitohs	Suncorp Stadium	24 – 18	Gillett, Kahu, Oates, Thaiday	Kahu(4/5)	30,578	
	Round 15	Bye						
Saturday, 24 June	Round 16	Canberra Raiders	GIO Stadium	30 – 20	Gillett (2), Glenn, Oates, Ofahengaue	Kahu (5/6)	15,652	
Friday, 30 June	Round 17	Melbourne Storm	Suncorp Stadium	12 – 42	Hunt, Mead	Kahu (2/2)	41,741	
	Round 18	Bye						
Saturday, 15 July	Round 19	Newcastle Knights	McDonald Jones Stadium	34 – 22	Kahu, Milford, Moga, Pearson, Roberts, Sims	Kahu(5/6)	13,773	
Thursday, 20 July	Round 20	Canterbury-Bankstown Bulldogs	Suncorp Stadium	42 – 12	Roberts (2), Blair, Hunt, Kahu, Moga, McGuire, Nikorima	Jordan Kahu(7/8)	24,267	
Friday, 28 July	Round 21	Parramatta Eels	ANZ Stadium	14 – 28	Gillett, Roberts	Kahu (3/3)	12,182	
Saturday, 5 August	Round 22	Gold Coast Titans	Cbus Super Stadium	54 – 0	Hunt (3), Nikorima (2), Milford, Moga, McGuire, Oates, Roberts	Kahu (7/9), Roberts (0/1)	21,716	
Friday, 11 August	Round 23	Cronulla Sutherland Sharks	Suncorp Stadium	32 – 10	Moga (2), Boyd, Gillett, Oates	Milford (6/9)	34,552	
Friday, 18 August	Round 24	St George Illawarra Dragons	Suncorp Stadium	24 – 12	Glenn (2), Kahu, Milford, Oates	Milford (2/5)	31,832	
Thursday, 24 August	Round 25	Parramatta Eels	Suncorp Stadium	34 – 52	Ese'ese, Glenn, Mead, Moga, McGuire, Oates	Milford (5/6)	29,058	
Thursday, 31 August	Round 26	North Queensland Cowboys	1300SMILES Stadium	20 – 10	Blair, Gillett, Kahu, Roberts	Kahu (2/4)	23,321	
Legend: Win Loss Draw Bye

=== Result by round ===
Round	1	2	3	4	5	6	7	8	9	10	11	12	13	14	15	16	17	18	19	20	21	22	23	24	25	26
Ground	A	H	A	H	A	H	H	A	H	A	H	A	A	H	B	A	H	B	A	H	A	A	H	H	H	A
Result	W	L	L	W	L	W	W	W	W	W	W	L	L	W	B	W	L	B	W	W	L	W	W	W	L	W
Position	5	7	9	8	9	7	6	5	4	4	2	4	5	5	4	3	5	5	4	3	4	3	2	2	3	3
Points	2	2	2	4	4	6	8	10	12	14	16	16	16	18	18	20	20	20	22	24	24	26	28	30	30	32

Source: National Rugby League
A = Away; H = Home; N = Neutral; B = Bye; W = Win; D = Draw; L = Loss

=== Finals ===
Qualifying and elimination finals
9 September – Melbourne
1	Melbourne Storm	18
4	Parramatta Eels	16
10 September – Sydney
5	Cronulla-Sutherland Sharks	14
8	North Queensland Cowboys	15
9 September – Sydney
6	Manly-Warringah Sea Eagles	10
7	Penrith Panthers	22
8 September – Sydney
2	Sydney Roosters	24
3	Brisbane Broncos	22

Semi-finals
16 September – Sydney
Parramatta Eels	16
North Queensland Cowboys	24
15 September – Brisbane
Brisbane Broncos	13
Penrith Panthers	6

Preliminary finals
22 September – Melbourne
Melbourne Storm	30
Brisbane Broncos	0
23 September – Sydney
Sydney Roosters	16
North Queensland Cowboys	29

Grand final
1 October – Sydney
Melbourne Storm	34
North Queensland Cowboys	6

Date	Round	Opponent	Venue	Score	Tries	Goals	Attendance
Friday 8 September	Qualifying Final	Sydney Roosters	Allianz Stadium	22 – 24	Oates, Hunt, Roberts	Kahu (3/4)	21,212
Friday 15 September	Semi Final	Penrith Panthers	Suncorp Stadium	13 – 6	Oates, Roberts	Kahu (2/4) Kahu (FG)	38,623
Sunday 22 September	Preliminary Final	Melbourne Storm	AAMI Park	0 – 30			28,821
Legend: Win Loss Draw Bye

== Statistics ==
Name	App	T	G	FG	Pts
Jai Arrow	12	0	0	0	0
Adam Blair	27	1	0	0	4
Darius Boyd	20	3	0	0	12
Herman Ese'ese	22	1	0	0	4
George Fai	1	0	0	0	0
Matt Gillett	25	7	0	0	28
Alex Glenn	27	5	0	0	20
Ben Hunt	21	7	0	0	28
Jamayne Isaako	1	0	0	0	0
Jordan Kahu	25	9	75	3	189
Andrew McCullough	18	2	0	0	8
Josh McGuire	25	3	0	0	12
Benji Marshall	13	1	0	0	4
David Mead	12	3	0	0	12
Anthony Milford	23	7	21	1	71
Tautau Moga	27	10	0	0	40
Kodi Nikorima	19	7	0	0	28
Corey Oates	21	15	0	0	60
Joe Ofahengaue	16	1	0	0	4
Tevita Pangai	18	0	0	0	0
Jonus Pearson	6	1	0	0	4
James Roberts	26	18	0	0	72
Korbin Sims	22	5	0	0	20
Jaydn Su'a	4	0	0	0	0
Sam Thaiday	26	3	0	0	12
Travis Waddell	1	0	0	0	0
Totals		109	96	4	632

== Representative honours ==
This table lists all players who played a representative match in 2017.

Player	Mid-season Tests	State of Origin 1	State of Origin 2	State of Origin 3	World Cup
Corey Allan	Junior Kangaroos	–	–	–	–
Adam Blair	New Zealand	—N/a	—N/a	—N/a	New Zealand
Darius Boyd	Australia	Queensland	Queensland	–	–
Herman Ese'ese	Samoa	—N/a	—N/a	—N/a	Samoa
Matt Gillett	Australia	Queensland	Queensland	Queensland	Australia
Alex Glenn	Cook Islands	—N/a	—N/a	—N/a	–
Ben Hunt	–	–	–	Queensland	Australia
Jordan Kahu	New Zealand	—N/a	—N/a	—N/a	–
David Mead	–	–	–	–	Papua New Guinea
Anthony Milford	Samoa	Queensland	–	–	–
Josh McGuire	Samoa	Queensland	Queensland	Queensland	Australia
Kodi Nikorima	New Zealand	—N/a	—N/a	—N/a	New Zealand
Joe Ofahengaue	Tonga	–	–	–	Tonga
Corey Oates	–	Queensland	–	–	–
Tevita Pangai Junior	–	–	–	–	Tonga
Korbin Sims	Fiji	–	–	–	Fiji
Jaydn Su'A	Junior Kangaroos	–	–	–	–
Sam Thaiday	Australia	Queensland	Queensland	Queensland	–

== Judiciary ==
Player	Round	Incident/Charge	Verdict	Result	Victim	Club	Ref(s)
Salesi Funaki	Trial	Dangerous Throw	Guilty	2 match ban			
Sam Thaiday	Round 3	Contrary Conduct	Guilty	$2,100 fine	Jesse Bromwich	Melbourne Storm	
Joe Ofahengaue	Round 24	Dangerous Throw	Guilty	3 match ban	Max King	Gold Coast Titans	
Adam Blair	Qualifying Final	Tripping	Guilty	$1,100 fine	Jake Friend	Sydney Roosters	

== See also ==
2017 NRL season
