= Joe Ofahengaue =

Tonga international rugby league footballer

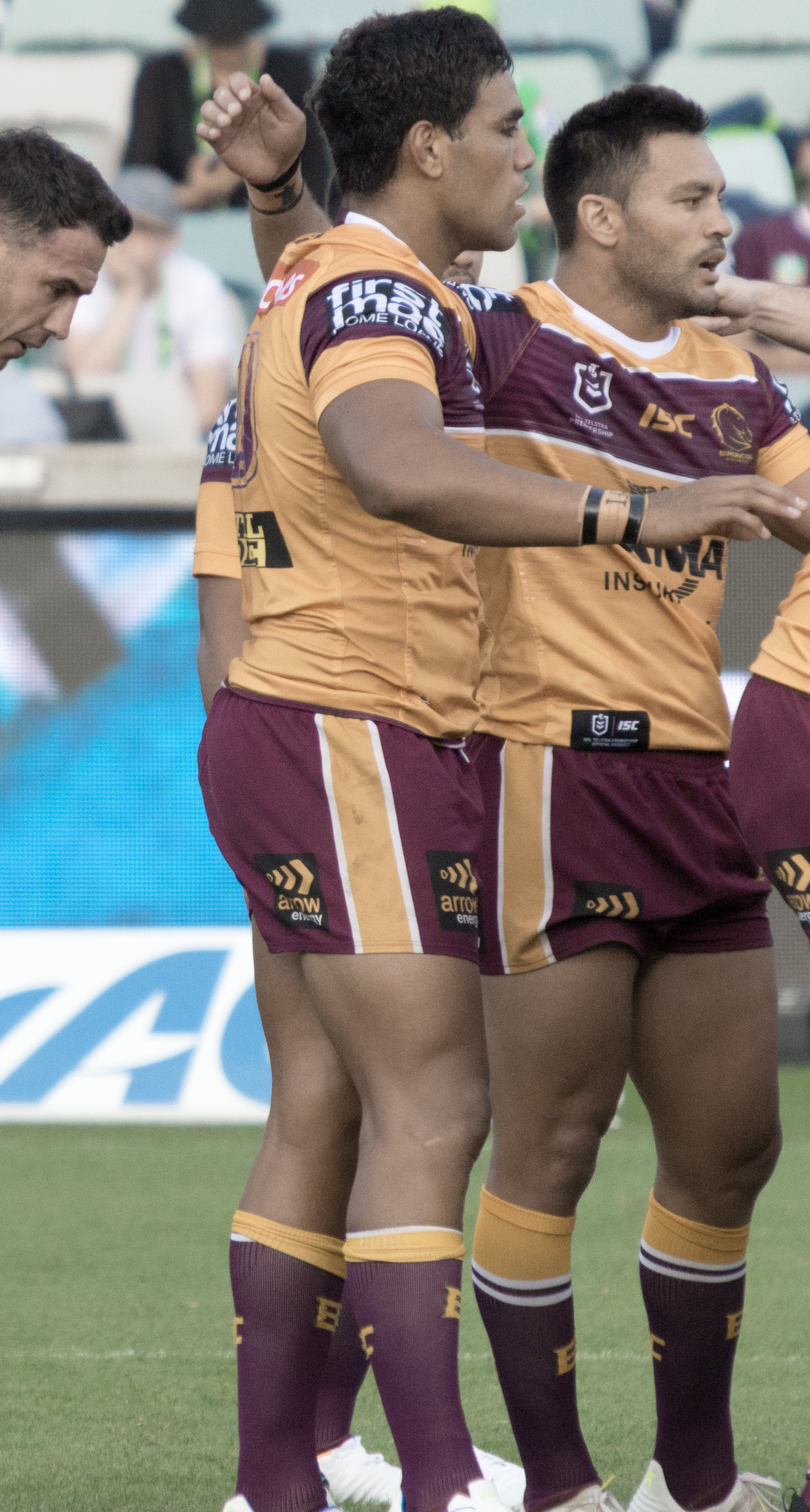

Personal information
- Full name: Joseph Anthony Young Ofahengaue
- Born: 15 September 1995 (age 31) Auckland, New Zealand
- Height: 6 ft 3 in (1.91 m)
- Weight: 18 st 2 lb (115 kg)

Playing information
- Position: Loose forward, Prop
Club
Years	Team	Pld	T	G	FG	P
2015–20	Brisbane Broncos	105	6	0	0	24
2021–23	Wests Tigers	56	3	0	0	12
2023–25	Parramatta Eels	41	3	0	0	12
2025–	Leigh Leopards	42	6	0	0	24
	Total	244	18	0	0	72
Representative
Years	Team	Pld	T	G	FG	P
2015–19	Tonga	7	0	0	0	0
2019–21	Queensland	3	0	0	0	0
- Source: As of 17 April 2025
- Relatives: Viliami Ofahengaue (uncle)

Joseph Anthony Young Ofahengaue (born 15 September 1995) is a Tonga at international rugby league footballer who plays as a loose forward and prop forward for the Leigh Leopards in the Super League.

He previously played for the Brisbane Broncos and Wests Tigers in the NRL, and has played at representative level for Queensland in State of Origin.

== Background ==
Born in Auckland, New Zealand, Ofahengaue is of Tongan descent, and moved to Australia as a 9-year old.

Ofahengaue played his junior rugby league for the Ipswich Brothers and attended Forest Lake State High School, St Edmund's College and St Peter Claver College alongside fellow NRL players Anthony Milford and Tautau Moga.

Ofahengaue is the nephew of Tongan-born Australian Wallabies rugby union player Viliami Ofahengaue.

== Playing career ==
=== Early career ===
In 2012, he played for the Sydney Roosters SG Ball team.

From 2013 to 2015, Ofahengaue played for the Brisbane Broncos' NYC team.

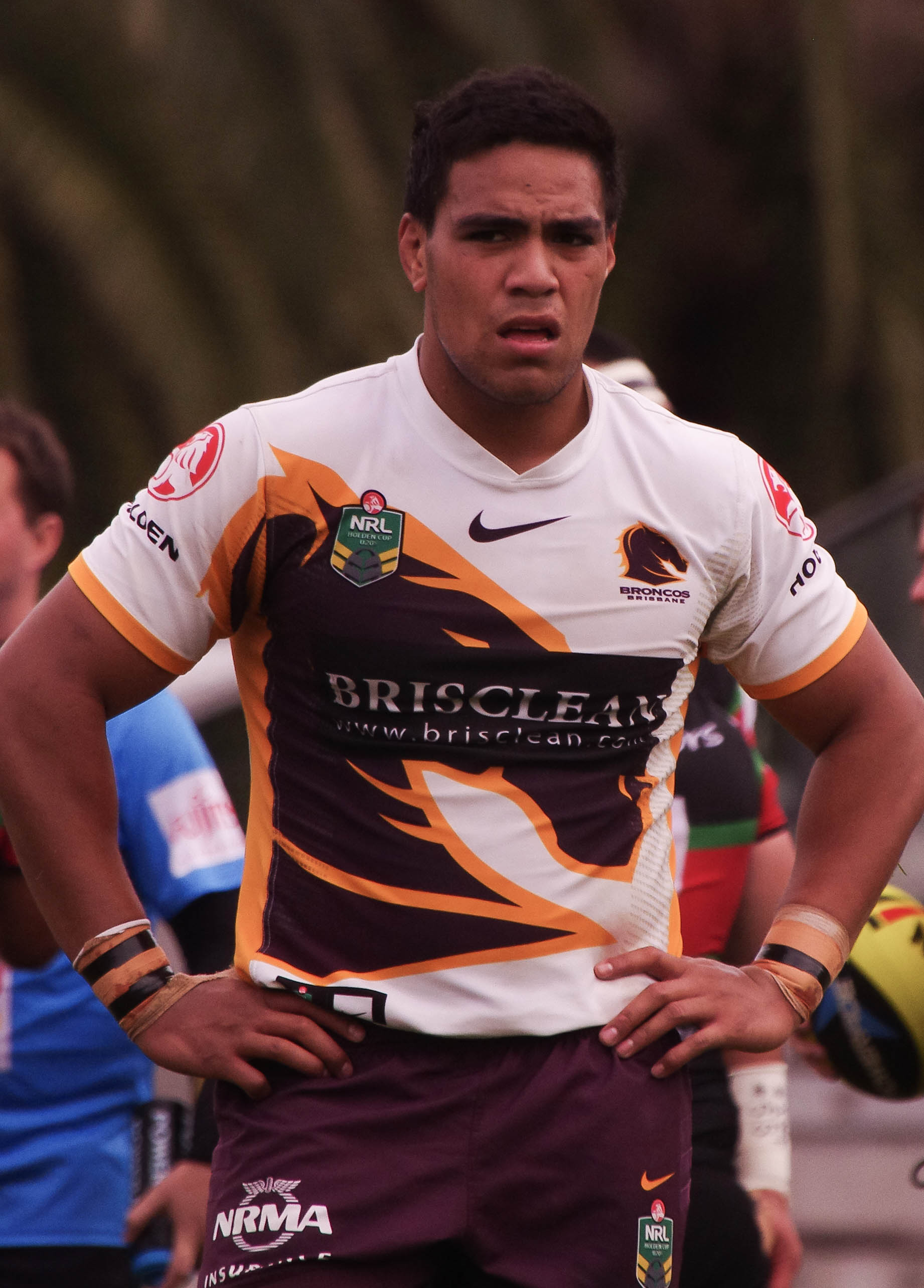
Ofahengaue playing for the Broncos in 2014

On 3 May 2014, Ofahengaue played for the Queensland under-20s team against the New South Wales under-20s team, playing off the interchange bench in the 30-8 loss at Penrith Stadium. On 5 October 2014, Ofahengaue played in the Broncos Holden Cup Grand final against the Junior New Zealand Warriors, starting at prop in the 34-32 loss. On 18 October 2014, he played for the Junior Kangaroos against the Junior Kiwis, starting at prop in the 15-14 loss at Mt Smart Stadium.

=== 2015 ===
In round 2 of the 2015 NRL season, Ofahengaue made his NRL debut for the Brisbane Broncos against the Cronulla-Sutherland Sharks, playing off the interchange bench in the 10-2 win at Shark Park. On 2 May 2015, Ofahengaue again played for the Junior Kangaroos against Junior Kiwis, starting at prop in the 22-20 win at Robina Stadium. On 1 June 2015, Ofahengaue re-signed with the Broncos on a two-year contract. On 14 September 2015, Ofahengaue was named at prop in the 2015 NYC Team of the Year. On 4 October 2015, in the Broncos 2015 NRL Grand Final against Queensland rivals the North Queensland Cowboys, Ofahengaue played off the interchange bench in the 17-16 heartbreaking golden point extra time loss. Ofahengaue finished his debut year in the NRL with him playing in 14 matches for the Broncos in the 2015 NRL season. On 17 October 2015, Ofahengaue played for Tonga against the Cook Islands in their Asia-Pacific Qualifier for the 2017 Rugby League World Cup, starting at lock in the 28-8 win at Campbelltown Stadium.

=== 2016 ===
On 12 January, Ofahengaue was selected in the Queensland Maroons emerging squad. In February, he was involved in the Maroons camp breach as he was one of the designated drivers alongside Dale Copley as they were with 8 other players such as Anthony Milford, Cameron Munster, Valentine Holmes and Dylan Napa who broke the camp midnight curfew and partied on into the night after a drinking session at the Story Bridge Hotel. Ofahengaue and Copley, however weren’t banned.

In round 7 against the Newcastle Knights, Ofahengaue scored his first NRL career try in the 53-0 demolished win at Suncorp Stadium. On 7 May 2016, Ofahengaue played for Tonga against Samoa in the 2016 Polynesian Cup, starting at lock in the 18-6 loss at Parramatta Stadium. Later into the season, Ofahengaue found himself behind in the pecking order in the forward stocks in the likes of Jai Arrow and Tevita Pangai Junior and was languishing in the Queensland Cup, playing for the Souths Logan Magpies for the rest of the year after round 21. Ofahengaue finished the 2016 NRL season with him playing in 16 matches and scoring 1 try.

=== 2017 ===
Ofahengaue had to appear in court in April after he was caught on CCTV footage cheating in a game of poker at the Treasury Casino by slipping a $100 chip under a $15 chip while the dealer was looking away and later copped a $400 fine with no conviction of fraud.

In round 8 against the South Sydney Rabbitohs, Ofahengaue made his return to the Broncos top squad, playing off the interchange bench in the 25-24 win at ANZ Stadium. On 8 May 2017, Ofahengaue played for Tonga against Fiji in a Pacific Test, starting at lock in the 26-24 win at Campbelltown Stadium. On 19 June 2017, Ofahengaue extended his contract with the Broncos to the end of the 2019 season. Ofahengaue finished the 2017 NRL season with him playing in 16 matches and scoring 1 try for the Broncos. On 5 October 2017, Ofahengaue was selected in the 24-man Tonga squad for the 2017 Rugby League World Cup. Ofahengaue only played in one match in the tournament which was against Lebanon, starting at prop in the 24-22 win at AMI Stadium in Christchurch.

=== 2018 ===
After showing some powerhouse performances in the earlier rounds of the season, Ofahengaue skyrocketed in contention for the Queensland Maroons as an interchange option but instead stuck with Tonga for the time being. Y On 23 June 2018, Ofahengaue was selected for Tonga to play in the 2018 Pacific test against Samoa, playing off the interchange bench in the 38-22 win at Campbelltown Stadium. Ofahengaue finished his best season up to date in the 2018 NRL season with him playing in 24 matches and scoring 3 tries. On 20 October 2018, Ofahengaue was selected for Tonga to play in their first ever test against Australia, playing off the interchange bench in the 34-16 loss at Mt Smart Stadium.

=== 2019 ===
Ofahengaue was selected to play for Queensland in the 2019 State of Origin series. Ofahengaue played in two of the matches in the series which New South Wales won 2-1. Ofahengaue made 20 appearances for Brisbane in the 2019 NRL season as the club finished 8th on the table and qualified for the finals. Ofahengaue played in the club's elimination final against Parramatta which Brisbane lost 58-0 at the new Western Sydney Stadium. The defeat was the worst in Brisbane's history and also the biggest finals defeat in history. Ofahengaue was also placed on report during the match after hitting Parramatta player Blake Ferguson in the head with a swinging arm. Ofahengaue was a part of Tonga’s historic victory over Australia in November, playing off the interchange bench.

=== 2020 ===
On 26 January, Ofahengaue was charged by Queensland police for a traffic infringement. He was found asleep behind the wheel of a stationary vehicle. On 28 February, Ofahengaue was suspended for two matches by Brisbane. Brisbane CEO Paul White spoke to the media saying, "The Broncos took the decision to stand down the player after taking into consideration that it was not his first driving offence in recent years. Joe is really disappointed in himself and very remorseful for what he has done. As a club, our goal is to set a standard for our players and Joe understands that he must pay a price for his actions that night."

Ofahengaue made 15 appearances for Brisbane in the 2020 NRL season as the club suffered their worst ever year on the field, culminating in the club's first Wooden Spoon.

On 29 November, he signed a three-year deal to join the Wests Tigers starting in 2021.

=== 2021 ===
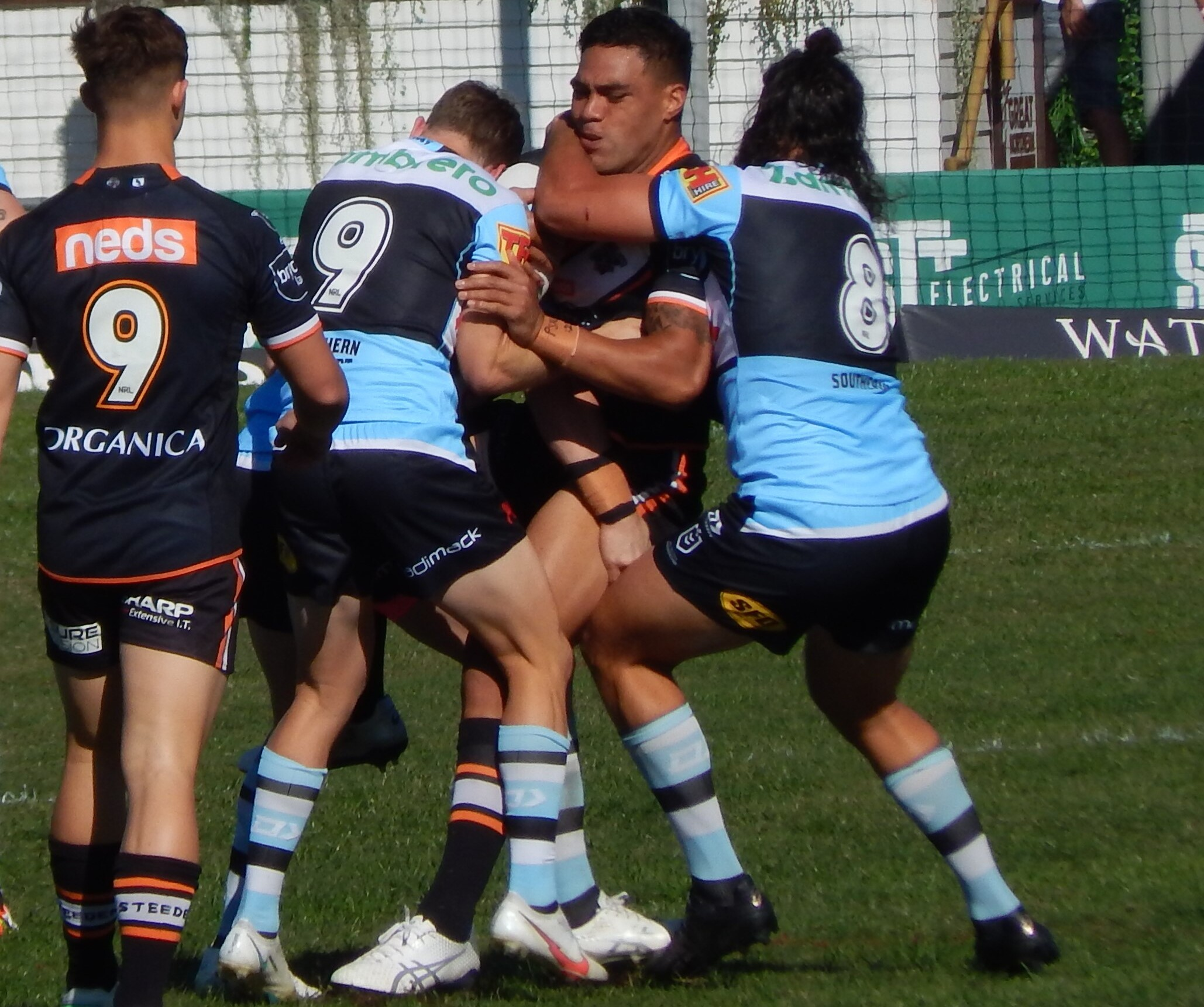
Ofahengaue turned around in the tackle for the Wests Tigers against the Cronulla Sharks in 2021

In round 1 of the 2021 NRL season, he made his debut for Wests Tigers in a 30-12 loss against Canberra.

He played a total of 23 games for the Wests Tigers in the 2021 as the club finished 13th and missed the finals.

=== 2022 ===
Despite Wests Tigers collecting the wooden spoon, Ofahengaue finished ninth in the competition for most tackles made, second in decoy runs, and tenth in runs made. He came 4th in the NRL's Hard Work Index, where he was described as having, "arguably the best year of his career". One of two players to appear in every game of Wests Tigers season, he was awarded the Kelly-Barnes Medal as the best player for the club.

At season's end, Ofahengaue signed a contract extension to remain at the club until the end of 2025. Incoming coach Tim Sheens said, "We’ve brought several younger players through the pathways this season, with more to come, and Joe has played a role in their development. He’s a player they look up to and are comfortable going to for advice. Like the younger guys, he too is always challenging himself to improve, and that’s exciting for all of us."

=== 2023 ===
On 20 May, Ofahengaue played his final game for the Wests Tigers starting at lock and scoring a try in a 66-18 win over North Queensland. On 23 May, Ofahengaue was granted an immediate release from his Wests Tigers contract to join Parramatta. He later said, "Everyone knows I didn't want to leave that club. Sometimes you’ve just got to read the room. Everyone knows how passionate I was about that club. I signed three years for a reason because I wanted to stay there to be a part of the changes that were going to come. Things changed, and what happened was out of my control."

Ofahengaue made his debut for Parramatta as a starting prop for their round 13 match against North Queensland. He sustained a calf injury within the first ten minutes and was taken from the field. Ofahengaue was later ruled out for an indefinite period. Ofahengaue played a total of 11 matches for Parramatta in the 2023 NRL season as the club finished 10th and missed the finals.

=== 2024 ===
In round 6 of the 2024 NRL season, Ofahengaue scored his try for Parramatta in their 27-20 victory over North Queensland. He made 24 appearances for Parramatta throughout the year as the club endured a tough campaign finishing 15th on the table.

=== 2025 ===
On 16 February, Ofahengaue was forced to apologise by Parramatta officials after he pulled the pants down of teammate Zac Lomax during a post-match interview with a female reporter. The following day, Ofahengaue apologised personally to the female reporter in question. On 17 April, Ofahengaue was granted an early release from his contract, he signed a deal with the Super League team Leigh. Ofahenguae played 17 games for Leigh in the 2025 Super League season including their semi-final loss against Wigan.

== Statistics ==
Year	Team	Games	Tries	Pts
2015	Brisbane Broncos	14		
2016	Brisbane Broncos	16	1	4
2017	Brisbane Broncos	16	1	4
2018	Brisbane Broncos	24	3	12
2019	Brisbane Broncos	20	1	4
2020	Brisbane Broncos	15		
2021	Wests Tigers	23	1	4
2022	Wests Tigers	24	1	4
2023	Wests Tigers	9	1	4
2023	Parramatta Eels	11		
2024	Parramatta Eels	24	1	4
2025	Parramatta Eels	6	1	4
2025	Leigh Leopards	18	5	20
2026	Leigh Leopards	11	1	4
	Totals	231	18	72
