= 2016 Anzac Test =

Rugby Match

Australia	New Zealand
16	0
	1	2	Total
AUS	10	6	16
NZL	0	0	0
- Date: 6 May 2016
- Stadium: Hunter Stadium
- Location: Newcastle, New South Wales, Australia
- Charles Savory Medal: Paul Gallen
- Referee: (Australia) Gerard Sutton
- Attendance: 27,724

Broadcast partners
- Broadcasters: (Australia) Nine Network (New Zealand) Sky Sport
- Commentators: Ray Warren Phil Gould Peter Sterling

The 2016 Anzac Test (known as the Downer Anzac Test due to sponsorship) was a rugby league test match played between Australia and New Zealand at Hunter Stadium in Newcastle. It was the 17th Anzac Test played between the two nations since the first was played under the Super League banner in 1997.

The game marked the international coaching debut of Mal Meninga for Australia since taking over the position from Tim Sheens in late 2015. Meninga, a 4 time Kangaroo Tourist (the only player ever to do so), a World Cup winning captain and a veteran of 46 tests for Australia between 1982–94, has previously coached Queensland to 9 State of Origin series wins in 10 years (including a record 8 series wins in succession from 2006-2013) in the years prior to taking over as Kangaroos coach.

This was the first of two matches between Australia and New Zealand before the 2016 Rugby League Four Nations in late October and November. The second match will be played at the nib Stadium in Perth, Western Australia on 15 October.

Meninga broke tradition and named the Australian team a few days early, which included 4 debutants; Blake Ferguson, Josh McGuire, Michael Morgan and Fijian-born Semi Radradra.

The New Zealand team was named on 1 May.

== Pre-game ==
=== National anthems ===
- Russ Walker - New Zealand National Anthem
- (Australia) Adrian Li Donni - Australian National Anthem

== Squads ==
Australia	Position	New Zealand
Darius Boyd	Fullback	Jordan Kahu
Semi Radradra	Wing	Jason Nightingale
Greg Inglis	Centre	Tohu Harris^{2}
Josh Dugan	Centre	Gerard Beale^{1}
Blake Ferguson	Wing	Dallin Watene-Zelezniak
Johnathan Thurston	Five-Eighth	Kodi Nikorima
Cooper Cronk	Halfback	Shaun Johnson
Matt Scott	Prop	Jesse Bromwich (c)
Cameron Smith (c)	Hooker	Lewis Brown
Paul Gallen	Prop	Adam Blair
Josh Papalii	2nd Row	Kevin Proctor
Matt Gillett	2nd Row	Manu Ma'u
Corey Parker	Lock	Jason Taumalolo
Josh McGuire	Interchange	Greg Eastwood
Michael Morgan	Interchange	Martin Taupau
James Tamou	Interchange	Sam Moa
Sam Thaiday	Interchange	Kenny Bromwich
Mal Meninga	Coach	Stephen Kearney

^{1} - Peta Hiku was originally selected to play but withdrew due to injury. He was replaced by Gerard Beale.
^{2} - Shaun Kenny-Dowall and Brad Takairangi were originally selected to play but both players withdrew. Tohu Harris was shifted from five-eighth to centre and Kodi Nikorima was shifted from the bench to five-eighth as a result.

- Aidan Guerra and Michael Jennings were a part of the Kangaroos squad but did not play in the match.
- Alex Glenn and Danny Levi were a part of the Kiwis squad but did not play in the match.

== Match summary ==
6 May 2016
8.05pm (AEST)

Australia	16–0	New Zealand
Tries: Boyd (14') 1 Inglis (32') 1 Ferguson (80') 1 Goals: Thurston 1/3 (20' pen); Smith 1/2 (44' pen); Sin Bin: Radradra 1 (6')

Hunter Stadium, Newcastle
Attendance: 27,724
Referee: (Australia) Gerard Sutton
Player of the Match: Paul Gallen

Notes:

- This was the annual 2016 Anzac Test.
- Australia's win ended a 3-match losing streak against New Zealand.
- This was the first time New Zealand were held scoreless in a test-match since 2007.
- With the victory, Australia reclaim the Bill Kelly Memorial Trophy.
- Martin Taupau and Sam Moa made their 10th test appearance for New Zealand.
- Blake Ferguson, Josh McGuire, Michael Morgan and Fijian-born Semi Radradra made their international debuts for Australia while Dallin Watene-Zelezniak, Kenny Bromwich and Manu Maʻu made their international debuts for New Zealand.

== Women's Test ==
2016 Women's Anzac Test
Australia	New Zealand
16	26
	1	2	Total
AUS	6	10	16
NZL	12	14	26
- Date: 6 May 2016
- Stadium: Hunter Stadium
- Location: Newcastle, New South Wales, Australia

Broadcast partners
- Broadcasters: (Australia) Nine Network (New Zealand) Sky Sport
- Commentators: Mathew Thompson Darren Lockyer Jo Barrett

A Women's rugby league match between the Australian Jillaroos and New Zealand Kiwi Ferns will serve as the curtain-raiser for the main game.

New Zealand coach Alan Jackson named an 18-strong squad in preparation for the Trans-Tasman Test.

A few days later, Australian coach Steve Folkes announced his 18-strong squad for the Trans-Tasman Test.

=== Women's squads ===
Australia	Position	New Zealand
Samantha Bremner	Fullback	Sarina Fiso (c)
Chelsea Baker	Wing	Lanulangi Veaimu
Corban McGregor	Centre	Maitua Feterika
Annette Brander	Centre	Va'anessa Molia-Fraser
Karina Brown	Wing	Atawhai Tupaea
Allana Ferguson	Five-Eighth	Georgia Hale
Maddie Studdon	Halfback	Kristina Sue
Simaima Taufa	Prop	Lilietta Maumau
Brittany Breayley	Hooker	Krystal Rota
Heather Ballinger	Prop	Kelly Maipi
Kezie Apps	2nd Row	Teuila Fotu-Moala
Vanessa Foliaki	2nd Row	Annetta Nu'uausala
Ruan Sims (c)	Lock	Nora Maaka
Libby Cook-Black	Interchange	Amber Kani
Kody House	Interchange	Kahurangi Peters
Casey Karklis	Interchange	Krystal Murray
Emma Young	Interchange	Charmaine McMenamin
Steve Folkes	Coach	Alan Jackson
Caitlyn Moran	18th Woman	Mary-Jane Ale

- The 18th woman is a cover for a possible injury or suspension and unless called up to the starting line-up or the bench, does not actually play.

=== Match summary ===
6 May 2016
5.25pm (AEST)

Australia	16 – 26	New Zealand
Tries: Brown (50', 78') 2 Bremner (24') 1 Goals: Studdon 1 (pen); Moran 1 (con)		Tries: Tupaea 2 (11', 17'); Fiso 2 (45', 64'); Feterika 1 (33'); Rota 1 (68'); Goals: Maaka 1 (con)

Hunter Stadium, Newcastle
Referee: (Australia) Adam Cassidy
