= Josh McGuire =

Australia & Samoa international rugby league footballer

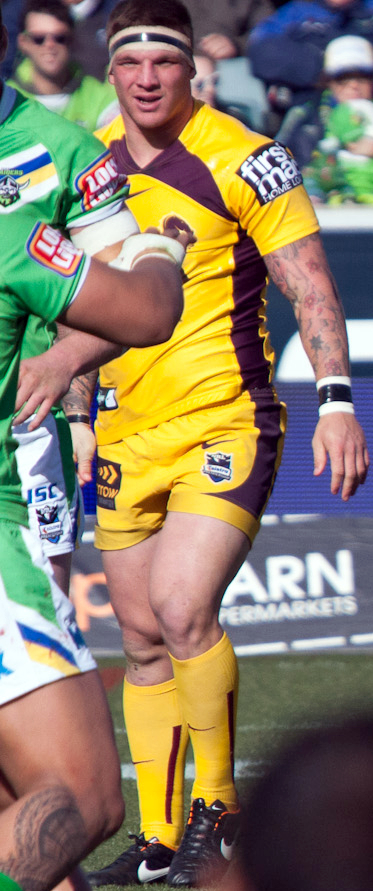

Personal information
- Full name: Joshua McGuire
- Born: 2 March 1990 (age 36) Brisbane, Queensland, Australia
- Height: 5 ft 11 in (1.80 m)
- Weight: 229 lb; 16 st 5 lb (104 kg)

Playing information
- Position: Prop, Lock, Second-row
Club
Years	Team	Pld	T	G	FG	P
2009–18	Brisbane Broncos	197	11	0	0	44
2019–21	North Qld Cowboys	38	0	0	0	0
2021–22	St. George Illawarra	27	2	0	0	8
2023	Warrington Wolves	7	1	0	0	4
	Total	269	14	0	0	56
Representative
Years	Team	Pld	T	G	FG	P
2010–17	Samoa	7	1	0	0	4
2012–14	Prime Minister's XIII	2	0	0	0	0
2015–19	Queensland	14	1	0	0	4
2016–18	Australia	8	0	0	0	0
- Source: As of 22 June 2023

Joshua McGuire (born 2 March 1990) is a professional rugby league footballer who played as a prop and lock. McGuire last played for the Warrington Wolves in the Super League and has also represented Samoa and Australia at an international level.

He previously played for the Brisbane Broncos, North Queensland Cowboys and the St. George Illawarra Dragons in the National Rugby League, and at representative level for the Prime Minister's XIII and Queensland in the State of Origin series.

== Background ==
McGuire was born in Brisbane, Queensland, Australia. His mother is from Auckland, New Zealand and his maternal grandfather is from Samoa. When he was two, he moved to Lismore, New South Wales with his family.

He moved back to Brisbane at age 12 and began playing junior football for the Aspley Devils at age 14, before being signed by the Brisbane Broncos.

Before playing rugby league, McGuire was a junior ice hockey player, having been scouted by Ralph Barahona to potentially trial for the Vancouver Canucks.

== Playing career ==
=== Early career ===
In 2007, McGuire played for Queensland under-17s and under-19s. In 2008, he played for Queensland under-18s. McGuire played for the Brisbane Broncos Under 20's side from 2008 to 2010, playing 29 games and scoring 11 tries.

=== 2009 ===
In Round 3, McGuire made his NRL debut for Brisbane against the New Zealand Warriors, playing off the interchange bench in Brisbane's 26–10 win at Mt Smart Stadium. In Round 22 against the Cronulla-Sutherland Sharks, McGuire scored his first NRL try in Brisbane's 30–10 win at Suncorp Stadium. McGuire finished his debut year in the NRL with him playing in 14 matches and scoring two tries.

=== 2010 ===
In the 2010, McGuire played in 14 matches for the Brisbane club. He debuted for Samoa against New Zealand on 16 October.

=== 2011 ===
In Round 8 against the Canterbury-Bankstown Bulldogs, McGuire suffered a serious eye injury after he was accidentally poked by teammate Mitchell Dodds, and has to attend hospital with significant bleeding. McGuire later returned for the Brisbane club in Round 17 against the Parramatta Eels. McGuire finished the year with 18 appearances. He was selected in the Australian Kangaroos train-on squad but was later omitted due to eligibility issues from playing for Samoa. On 26 October, McGuire re-signed with Brisbane for three further seasons.

=== 2012 ===
In round 2 against the North Queensland Cowboys, McGuire scored his first try for Brisbane since round 23 of 2009. He was selected as 18th man for Queensland in Game 2 of the 2012 State of Origin series. On 23 September, McGuire played for the Prime Minister's XIII against Papua New Guinea, playing off the interchange bench in the 24–18 win at Port Moresby.

=== 2013 ===
McGuire scored one try from 19 matches in 2013.

=== 2014 ===
In Round 12 against the Manly-Warringah Sea Eagles, McGuire played his 100th NRL career match in Brisbane's 36–10 win at Suncorp Stadium. He was again selected as 18th man for Queensland in Game 3 of the 2014 State of Origin series. McGuire finished the regular season with him playing in 24 matches and scoring two tries. On 7 October, McGuire was selected in the Samoan 24-man squad for the Four Nations series while he was in the Prime Minister's XIII squad. After fulfilling his obligations with the PM's XIII, McGuire would go on to play in all 3 matches of the tournament, starting at hooker in two of the test matches. On 18 October, McGuire revealed that he was playing blind in his left eye after suffering a detached retina from the eye-poke that saw him sidelined in 2011.

=== 2015 ===
On 23 January, McGuire re-signed with Brisbane to the end of the 2017 season. On 2 May, McGuire played for Samoa against Tonga in the 2015 Polynesian Cup. On 27 May, in Game 1 of the 2015 State of Origin series, McGuire made his long-awaited State of Origin debut for Queensland, playing off the interchange bench in the 11–10 win at ANZ Stadium. McGuire also played in Game 2 of the series before his season-ending Achilles tendon injury he suffered in Round 16 against the Newcastle Knights. McGuire was unfortunately sidelined for the rest of the season, where he watched his team made it up to the grand final. McGuire managed two tries from 13 matches for the season.

=== 2016 ===
In the season opening match against the Parramatta Eels, McGuire made his return to the Broncos team from injury in the 17–4 win. On 6 May, McGuire made his international debut for Australia against New Zealand in the 2016 Anzac Test, playing off the interchange bench in the 16–0 win at Hunter Stadium. In the 2016 State of Origin series, McGuire played in all 3 matches for Queensland, including starting at prop in Game 2, where the Maroons won 26–16 at Suncorp Stadium. After the series-winning match, McGuire wrote a Tweet about the victory, mocking New South Wales saying "Losers have meetings, Winners have parties". On 13 September, in the lead-up to the Broncos do-or-die semi-final match against premiers the North Queensland Cowboys, McGuire and Broncos-contracted Wynnum-Manly Seagulls Queensland Cup player Salesi Funaki were involved in a scuffle at training after Funaki reacted to McGuire's overzealous tackle on him before he started to throw a few punches towards McGuire but was quickly broken up by other players. In the match against the North Queensland side, McGuire played his 150th NRL game in the season-ending 26-20 golden point extra time loss. McGuire finished the season with 24 matches for Brisbane. McGuire was added to the Australia Kangaroos Four Nations train-on squad but didn't make the final squad.

=== 2017 ===
On 9 March 2017, McGuire extended his contract with the Brisbane club until the end of the 2021 season. On 6 May 2017, McGuire played for Samoa in the test against England, starting at lock in the 30–10 loss at Campbelltown Stadium. For the 2017 State of Origin series, McGuire played in all 3 matches, starting at lock, replacing the retired Corey Parker, and had a very good series helping Queensland win the series and was controversially not picked for the man of the match award in Game 2 ahead of NSW's Josh Jackson in a 18-16 victorious side. On 16 June 2017, McGuire was selected in the Inaugural Australian Merit Team at lock after his outstanding performances in the State of Origin series. McGuire finished the 2017 NRL season with him playing in 25 matches and scoring 3 tries for the Broncos. On 3 October 2017, McGuire was selected in the 24-man Australia Kangaroos 2017 Rugby League World Cup squad. McGuire played in 5 matches of the tournament, including starting at lock the World Cup Final match against England in the hard-fought 6–0 victory at Suncorp Stadium.

=== 2018 ===
McGuire played 19 games for Brisbane in 2018, starting 17 games at lock and two at hooker. He started three games at lock for Queensland in their series loss to New South Wales and in October, started two games at lock for Australia.

On 19 November, McGuire was granted a release from the final three-years of his Brisbane contract to join the North Queensland Cowboys on a four-year deal.

=== 2019 ===
In Round 1 of the 2019 NRL season, McGuire made his debut for North Queensland in their 24–12 win over the St. George Illawarra Dragons. In Round 6, he played his 200th NRL game in North Queensland's 17–10 win over the Warriors.

Despite great form for his new club, McGuire's 2019 was plagued by on-field incidents. In Round 5, he avoided suspension for an alleged eye gouge on Queensland and Australian teammate Cameron Munster. Munster refused to make a complaint to referees after the incident. McGuire was charged with grade one contrary conduct and fined $3550.

Following a Round 13 loss to the Manly Sea Eagles, he was charged again after putting his hands in the face of Dylan Walker. He again escaped suspension with a $4500 fine. He would be suspended for one-week after a late hit on James Maloney while playing for Queensland during the 2019 State of Origin series. In North Queensland's Round 21 loss to the Brisbane Broncos, McGuire was charged again for putting his hands in the face of an opponent, this time Brisbane's David Fifita, and was suspended for three weeks.

He returned for North Queensland's final game of the season, a loss to the Melbourne Storm, and was charged for a trip on Cameron Smith. He took the early guilty and accepted a one-game suspension.

=== 2020 ===
In February, McGuire was a member of the Cowboys' 2020 NRL Nines winning squad. He played in the side's first three games before injuring his knee in a win over the South Sydney Rabbitohs.

McGuire missed Round 1 of the 2020 NRL season due to his suspension from the previous season, returning the next week in North Queensland's 24–16 win over the Canterbury Bulldogs. He missed two more games in 2020 both due to suspension. He was suspended for one game after a crusher tackle on Manly-Warringah Sea Eagles' half Cade Cust in Round 11. In Round 18, he was sin-binned for dissent by referee Grant Atkins and was later charged and suspended for one week.

On 3 October, McGuire won North Queensland's Players' Player award.

=== 2021 ===
On 13 April, it was announced that McGuire would immediately switch to the St George Illawarra Dragons and stay at the club until the end of 2022.

In round 9 of the 2021 NRL season, McGuire tasted his first win of the season as the club defeated Canterbury-Bankstown 32–12. McGuire had previously been part of eight previous losses with four of them being with both North Queensland and St. George Illawarra.

In round 10, McGuire was sent to the sin bin during the club's 44–18 loss against Melbourne. On 17 May, McGuire was suspended for five matches in relation to the sin bin offence.

On 5 July 2021, McGuire was fined $12,000 by the NRL and suspended for one game after breaching the game's COVID-19 biosecurity protocols when he attended a party along with 12 other St. George Illawarra players at Paul Vaughan's property.

In the final round of the regular season, McGuire was sent to the sin bin for a dangerous tackle during the club's loss against South Sydney. The following week, McGuire was suspended for five matches in relation to the incident.

=== 2022 ===
On 20 July, McGuire signed a two-year deal to join English side Warrington starting in 2023.

=== 2023 ===
On 4 February, During a pre-season game against Leigh, McGuire dismissed from the field after using unacceptable language. On 14 February following an investigation by the RFL, McGuire was found guilty of using a disability derogatory word and received a seven-match ban. On 6 June, McGuire was handed a 12-game suspension and fined £1000 for using "unacceptable language" during Warrington's loss against Leigh in May. On 19 June, it was confirmed that McGuire had left Warrington by "mutual agreement", to return home to Australia.

== Post playing ==
In April 2024, McGuire returned to the Broncos as part of the coaching staff, he became the teams wrestling coach. On 5 December 2025, it was revealed that McGuire had been arrested and charged with two offences including one of common assault. The charges related to the alleged strangulation of a five-year-old child. McGuire was set to face Brisbane Magistrates Court on 17 December 2025. On 4 February 2026, Maguire's case was heard in Brisbane's magistrates court for the first time. Maguire was on bail and did not appear for the hearing. On 13 August 2026, McGuire was committed to stand trial to face the common assault and strangulation charges that were laid in December 2025.

== Achievements and accolades ==
=== Individual ===
- Brisbane Broncos Most Improved: 2011
- Brisbane Broncos Most Consistent: 2012
- Brisbane Broncos Best Forward: 2014
- North Queensland Cowboys Players' Player of the Year: 2020

=== Team ===
- 2020 NRL Nines: North Queensland Cowboys – Winners

== Statistics ==
=== NRL ===
Statistics are correct to the end of the 2023 season

Season	Team	Matches	T	G	GK %	F/G	Pts
2009	Brisbane	14	2	0	—	0	8
2010	Brisbane	14	0	0	—	0	0
2011	Brisbane	18	0	0	—	0	0
2012	Brisbane	24	1	0	—	0	4
2013	Brisbane	19	1	0	—	0	4
2014	Brisbane	24	2	0	—	0	8
2015	Brisbane	13	2	0	—	0	8
2016	Brisbane	24	0	0	—	0	0
2017	Brisbane	25	3	0	—	0	12
2018	Brisbane	19	0	0	—	0	0
2019	North Queensland	17	0	0	—	0	0
2020	North Queensland	17	0	0	—	0	0
2021	St. George Illawarra Dragons	13	2				8
2022	St. George Illawarra Dragons	14					
2023	Warrington Wolves	7	1				4
Career totals		266	14	0	—	0	56

=== State of Origin ===
†	Denotes seasons in which McGuire won a State of Origin Series

Season	Team	Matches	T	G	GK %	F/G	Pts
2015†	Queensland	2	0	0	—	0	0
2016†	Queensland	3	0	0	—	0	0
2017†	Queensland	3	1	0	—	0	4
2018	Queensland	3	0	0	—	0	0
2019	Queensland	3	1	0	—	0	4
Career totals		14	1	0	—	0	4

=== International ===
†	Denotes seasons in which McGuire won a World Cup

Season	Team	Matches	T	G	GK %	F/G	Pts
2010	Samoa	2	0	0	—	0	0
2014	Samoa	3	0	0	—	0	0
2015	Samoa	1	1	0	—	0	4
2016	Australia	1	0	0	—	0	0
2017	Samoa	1	0	0	—	0	0
2017†	Australia	5	0	0	—	0	0
2018	Australia	2	0	0	—	0	0
Career totals		15	1	0	—	0	4
