= St Peter Claver College =

- Ipswich, Queensland; Australia

Information
- Type: Private, co-educational
- Motto: Concern Love Justice
- Denomination: Catholic
- Principal: Charles Brauer
- Colors: Fisher House; More House; Chisolm House; Xavier House
- Slogan: Concern, Love and Justice
- Website: www.spcc.qld.edu.au

St Peter Claver College is a Roman Catholic co-educational secondary school located in the suburb of Riverview in Ipswich, Queensland, Australia. It was founded in 1976, on the traditional lands of the Ugarapul clan of the Yuggera Nation, and was named in honour of St Peter Claver, the Spanish Jesuit priest and patron saint of the slaves.

== Cultures ==
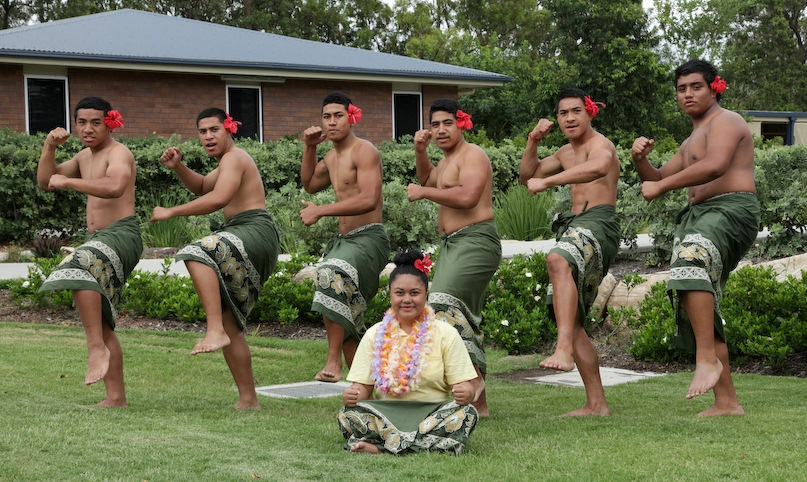
St Peter Claver College students celebrating Harmony Day (21 May) by performing a cultural dance

St Peter Claver College is a school with students of varied background. The college offers the study of different languages (Japanese). Cultural dance is often observed every year on harmony day.

== Rugby league program ==
St Peter Claver College offers a range of different sports to students in year levels 8–12. One of these is the rugby league program aimed at developing and perfecting students' skills and techniques. St Peter Claver enters a team(s) from each grade to participate in the CISSSA (Combined Ipswich Secondary School Sport Association) competition. Each year level holds two teams. The a team has the opportunity to enter the Broncos Challenge Cup and compete if they win their games in a round robin tournament. Each year Claver has a team from each year level make this tournament. The b team then competes in the CISSSA Competition. In grade 9, 10, 11 and 12, students may select rugby league as a HPE subject. St Peter Claver has developed promising NRL stars Anthony Milford (Canberra Raiders) and Tautau Moga (Sydney Roosters) and Brett Greinke, who plays in Broncos under 20s and Queensland side. St Peter Claver has had many Queensland and Met West students attend the school. Claver Rugby League students attend the Confraternity Cup every year.

== Principals ==
The school principals have been a mix of Marist Brothers and lay teachers:

- Bob Cullen (1976–1986)
- Kenneth Welsh (Marist brother)
- Dominic O’Sullivan (Marist brother)
- Peter Carroll (Marist brother)
- Michael Carroll
- Kerry Mulkerin
- Diarmuid O'Riordan
- Niall Coburn
- Terry Finan
- Bruce Mcphee
- Charles Brauer

== Notable alumni ==
- Paulo Aokuso, professional boxer, competed in the 2021 Tokyo Olympics
- Joanna Lindgren, politician
- Anthony Milford, rugby league player
- Tautau Moga, rugby league player
- Joe Ofahengaue, rugby league player
- Susan Seipel, para-canoeist
- Marion Seve, rugby league player
- Dylan Wenzel-Halls, soccer player for Brisbane Roar
