= Jordan Kahu =

New Zealand international rugby league footballer

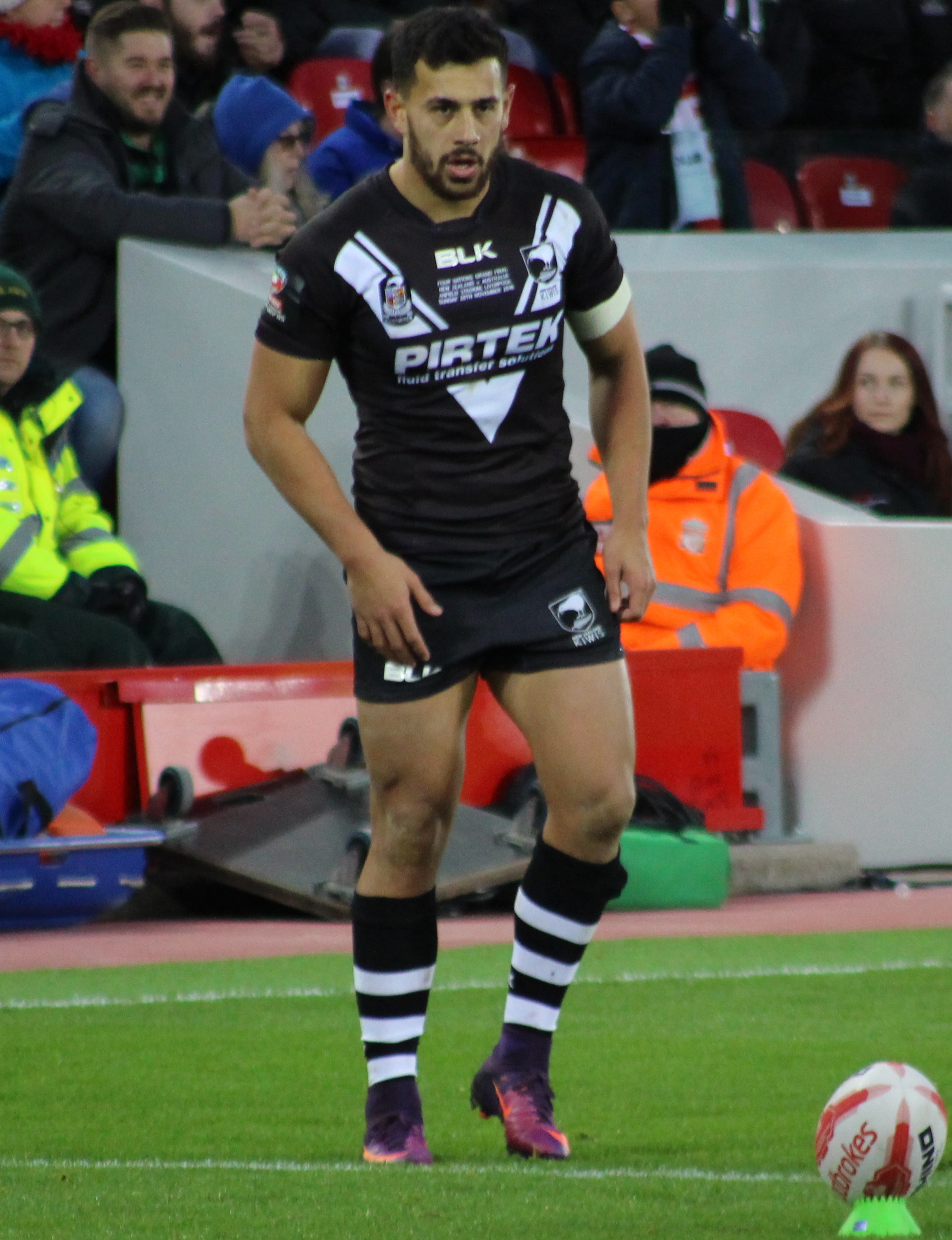

Personal information
- Full name: Jordan Kahukuranui
- Born: 28 January 1991 (age 35) Lower Hutt, Wellington, New Zealand
- Height: 184 cm (6 ft 0 in)
- Weight: 93 kg (14 st 9 lb)

Playing information
- Position: Wing, Centre, Fullback
Club
Years	Team	Pld	T	G	FG	P
2013–18	Brisbane Broncos	98	42	149	3	469
2019	North Qld Cowboys	19	1	40	2	86
2020	Brisbane Broncos	2	0	0	0	0
	Total	119	43	189	5	555
Representative
Years	Team	Pld	T	G	FG	P
2015–17	New Zealand	9	3	5	1	23
2016	World All Stars	1	0	0	0	0
2019	Māori All Stars	1	0	1	0	2
- Source: As of 21 May 2020

Jordan Kahu (born 28 January 1991) is a former professional rugby league footballer who played as a winger or centre, fullback for the Brisbane Broncos and North Queensland Cowboys in the NRL.

Kahu represented New Zealand at international level and also made appearances for the World All Stars and New Zealand Māori. .

== Background ==
Born in Lower Hutt, New Zealand, Kahu is of Māori descent specifically the Ngāti Toa Iwi (tribe). Kahu is short for Jordan's birth surname Kahukuranui. Kahu attended Wellington College and played his junior rugby union for the Petone Rugby Club with Lima Sopoaga before moving to Australia to attend Keebra Park State High School. While at Keebra Park, Kahu captained the school's rugby league side to win the 2009 Arrive Alive Cup. Kahu played for the Broncos NYC team in 2010 and 2011, scoring 11 tries and kicking 2 goals in 23 games. Kahu's 2011 and 2012 seasons were shattered by two season ending knee injuries.

== Playing career ==
=== 2013 ===
In Round 4 of the 2013 NRL season, Kahu made his NRL debut for the Brisbane Broncos against the Melbourne Storm at centre in the 32–26 loss at Suncorp Stadium. In the Round 9 match against the Parramatta Eels, Kahu scored his first and second NRL tries in the Broncos 19–18 loss at Parramatta Stadium. Soon after, Kahu extended his contract with the Broncos for 2 years, keeping him at the club until the end of the 2015 season. He scored 4 tries from 10 appearances in his debut year.

=== 2014 ===
Kahu injured his knee again for a third time in four years in a trial match against the North Queensland Cowboys. In Round 19 against the New Zealand Warriors, Kahu played his first match for the Broncos of the 2014 season playing on the wing for the suspended Daniel Vidot and scoring a try in the 28–22 win. He finished off the season playing in 3 matches and scoring three tries.

=== 2015 ===
Due to the injury of incumbent fullback Darius Boyd during the off-season, Kahu was selected to fill in at fullback showing promising performances in the early rounds. During a "breakout season", Kahu was rewarded with a 2-year contract extension with Broncos, to the end of the 2017 season. On 4 October, Kahu played on the wing in the Broncos' 17-16 golden point extra time loss to the North Queensland Cowboys in the 2015 NRL Grand Final. He finished off the 2015 season having played in 22 matches, scoring 9 tries and kicking 22 goals. On 9 October, he was selected in the 23-man New Zealand squad to tour England. Kahu was one of four members of Brisbane's Grand Final team to be included in coach Stephen Kearney's squad for the Three-Test tour and one of six rookies to have received an international call-up by the Kiwis. On 2 November, he made his New Zealand international debut against England, playing at centre in the Kiwis' 26–12 loss at KC Stadium.

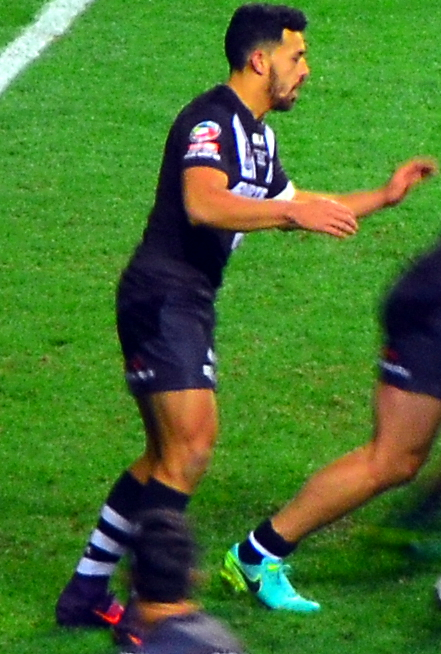
Kahu representing the Kiwis

On 14 November, in the third and final test match against England, he scored his first international try for New Zealand in the Kiwis' 20–14 loss at DW Stadium.

=== 2016 ===
On 13 February, Kahu played for the World All Stars against the Indigenous All Stars, playing at fullback in his team's 12–8 win at Suncorp Stadium. In the Round 1 season opening match against the Parramatta Eels, he scored the first try of the 2016 season in the Broncos' 17–4 win at Parramatta Stadium. On 6 May, Kahu played for New Zealand against Australia in the 2016 Anzac Test, playing at fullback in the 16–0 loss at Hunter Stadium. Kahu finished the 2016 NRL season with him playing in 20 matches, scoring 15 tries and kicking 42 goals for the Broncos. On 21 September 2016, Kahu was added to the New Zealand national rugby league team train-on squad for the 2016 Four Nations. On 3 October 2016, Kahu was selected in the final 24-man squad. Kahu played in 4 matches of tournament including starting at fullback and scoring 2 tries in the Kiwis 34-8 Four Nations Final loss against Australia at Anfield.

=== 2017 ===
In February 2017, Kahu was selected in the Broncos 2017 NRL Auckland Nines squad. In Round 1 season opening match against the Cronulla-Sutherland Sharks, Kahu put his name in the record books by scoring the first try of the 2017 season in the Broncos 26–18 win at Shark Park, Kahu is the first player to score the first try of the season in two consecutive seasons. On 5 May 2017, Kahu played for New Zealand in the 2017 ANZAC Test against Australia where he started at centre and kicked 2 goals in the 30–12 loss at Canberra Stadium. On 5 August 2017, Kahu extended his contract with the Broncos to the end of the 2020 season. Kahu finished the 2017 NRL season with him playing in 25 matches, scoring 9 tries and kicking 74 goals and 3 field goals for the Broncos. Kahu was in the frame to be selected in the Kiwis 2017 Rugby League World Cup squad but opted to sit out the tournament to recover from a groin injury.

=== 2018 ===
In Round 2 of the 2018 NRL season, Kahu fractured his jaw in the Broncos' win over the North Queensland Cowboys. He returned 10 weeks later in the Broncos' Round 12 win over the Parramatta Eels. He finished the 2018 season with 15 games, two tries, seven goals and 22 points, his lowest tally in all categories since 2015.

=== 2019 ===
On 15 February, Kahu represented the Māori All Stars side, kicking a goal in the 14–34 loss to the Indigenous All Stars. On 18 February, Kahu joined the North Queensland Cowboys on a one-year deal.

In Round 1 of the 2019 NRL season, he made his debut for the Cowboys, starting at fullback in their 24–12 win over the St George Illawarra Dragons. In Round 17, he fractured his eye socket in the Cowboys' 15–12 win over the Sydney Roosters, missing five weeks. He returned in Round 22, playing the final four games of the season. He ended the 2019 season as the Cowboys' top point scorer, with 86 points in 19 games.

On 13 September, it was announced that he would be leaving the Cowboys at the end of the season. With clauses in his previous contract with the Broncos still standing, Kahu returned to the Broncos for the 2019-2020 pre-season.

=== 2020 ===
Hampered by the injuries and indifferent form of their available centres and wingers, Kahu made only two appearances for Brisbane in the 2020 NRL season, a year in which the club finished last on the table for the first time in their history.

== 2021 ==
Kahu announced that he would retire at the end of the 2021 NRL season.

== Statistics ==
=== NRL ===
Statistics are correct to the end of the 2019 season

Season	Team	Matches	T	G	GK %	F/G	Pts
2013	Brisbane	10	4	0	—	0	16
2014	Brisbane	3	3	0	—	0	12
2015	Brisbane	22	9	22	68.6%	0	80
2016	Brisbane	20	15	42	79.3%	0	144
2017	Brisbane	25	9	74	78.7%	3	187
2018	Brisbane	15	2	7	77.8%	0	22
2019	North Queensland	19	1	40	74.1%	2	86
2020	Brisbane	2	0	0	-	0	0
Career totals		114	43	185	76.5%	5	547
