= Tautau Moga =

Former Samoa international rugby league footballer

Tautau "Tee" Moga
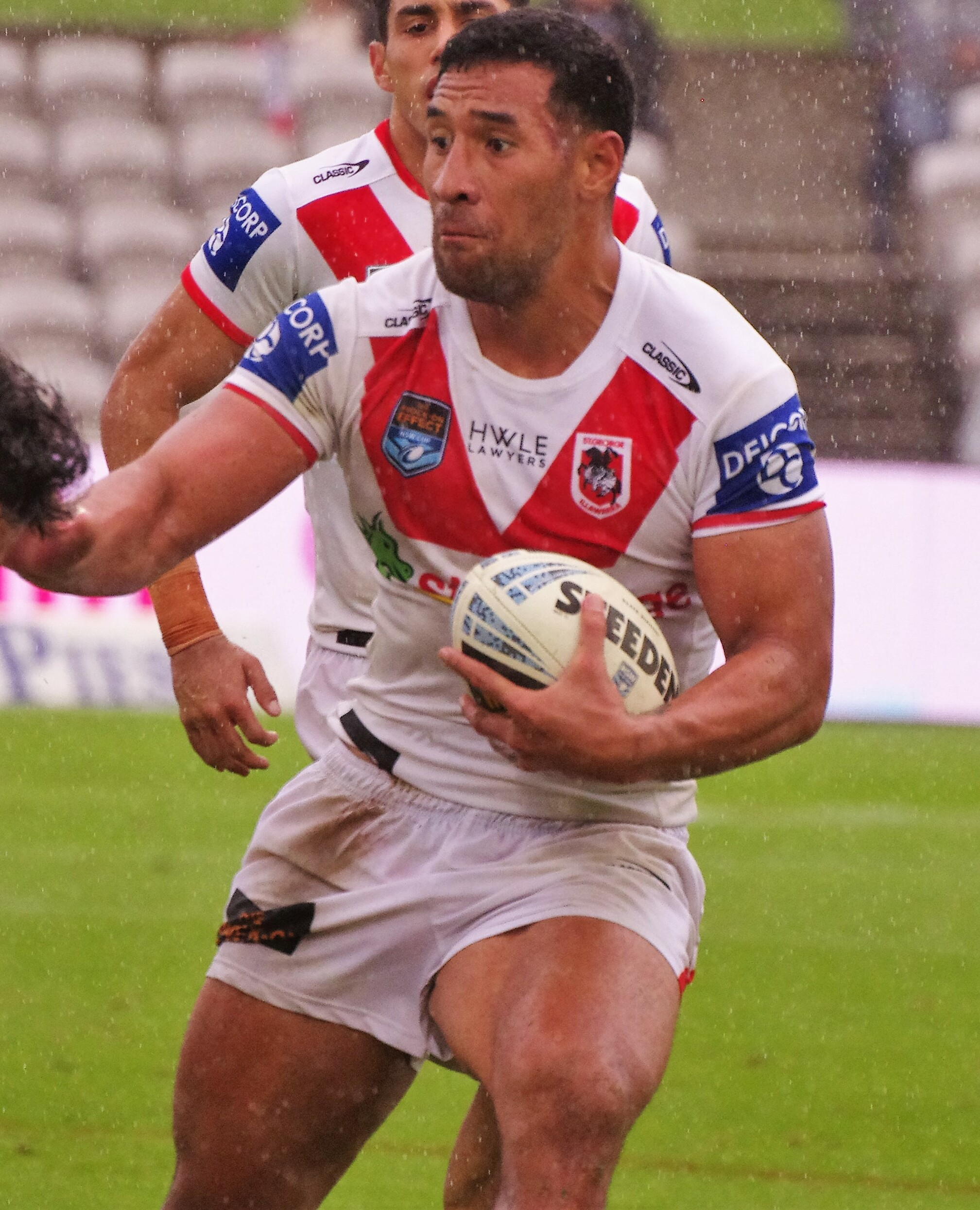

Personal information
- Full name: Tautau Moga
- Born: 6 December 1993 (age 32) Ipswich, Queensland, Australia
- Height: 193 cm (6 ft 4 in)
- Weight: 110 kg (17 st 5 lb)

Playing information
- Position: Centre, Wing, Second-row
Club
Years	Team	Pld	T	G	FG	P
2012–13	Sydney Roosters	14	7	0	0	28
2014–16	North Qld Cowboys	18	3	0	0	12
2017	Brisbane Broncos	27	9	0	0	36
2018–20	Newcastle Knights	14	4	0	0	16
2021	South Sydney	1	0	0	0	0
2022–23	St. George Illawarra	13	13	0	0	52
	Total	87	36	0	0	144
Representative
Years	Team	Pld	T	G	FG	P
2014–15	Samoa	3	1	0	0	4
- Source: As of 29 June 2023

Tautau Moga (born 6 December 1993) is a Samoa international rugby league footballer who plays as a centre and winger in the National Rugby League (NRL).

He previously played for the Sydney Roosters, North Queensland Cowboys, Brisbane Broncos, Newcastle Knights, South Sydney Rabbitohs and the St George Illawarra Dragons in the NRL.

== Background ==
He was born in Ipswich, Queensland, Australia.

Moga is of Samoan descent. Growing up in Ipswich, he played his junior rugby league for the Redbank Plains Bears and Springfield Panthers. He attended St Peter Claver College in Ipswich, where he was the recipient of the 2010 Ronald Holmes memorial trophy as the school's Player of the Year. He represented the Australian Schoolboys in 2010.

Moga joined the Sydney Roosters system at age 14. He took the next step and played for the Roosters SG Ball team before being fast tracked into the Toyota Cup team in 2011. Moga turned heads in the competition, scoring 18 tries in 13 games. In late 2011, he would have become the youngest Roosters debutant in 73 years if not for a new NRL rule barring players under the age of 18 from playing first grade.

== Playing career ==
=== 2012 ===
Moga joined the Sydney Roosters first grade squad and started the season playing in the Toyota Cup and for the Newtown Jets in the NSW Cup.

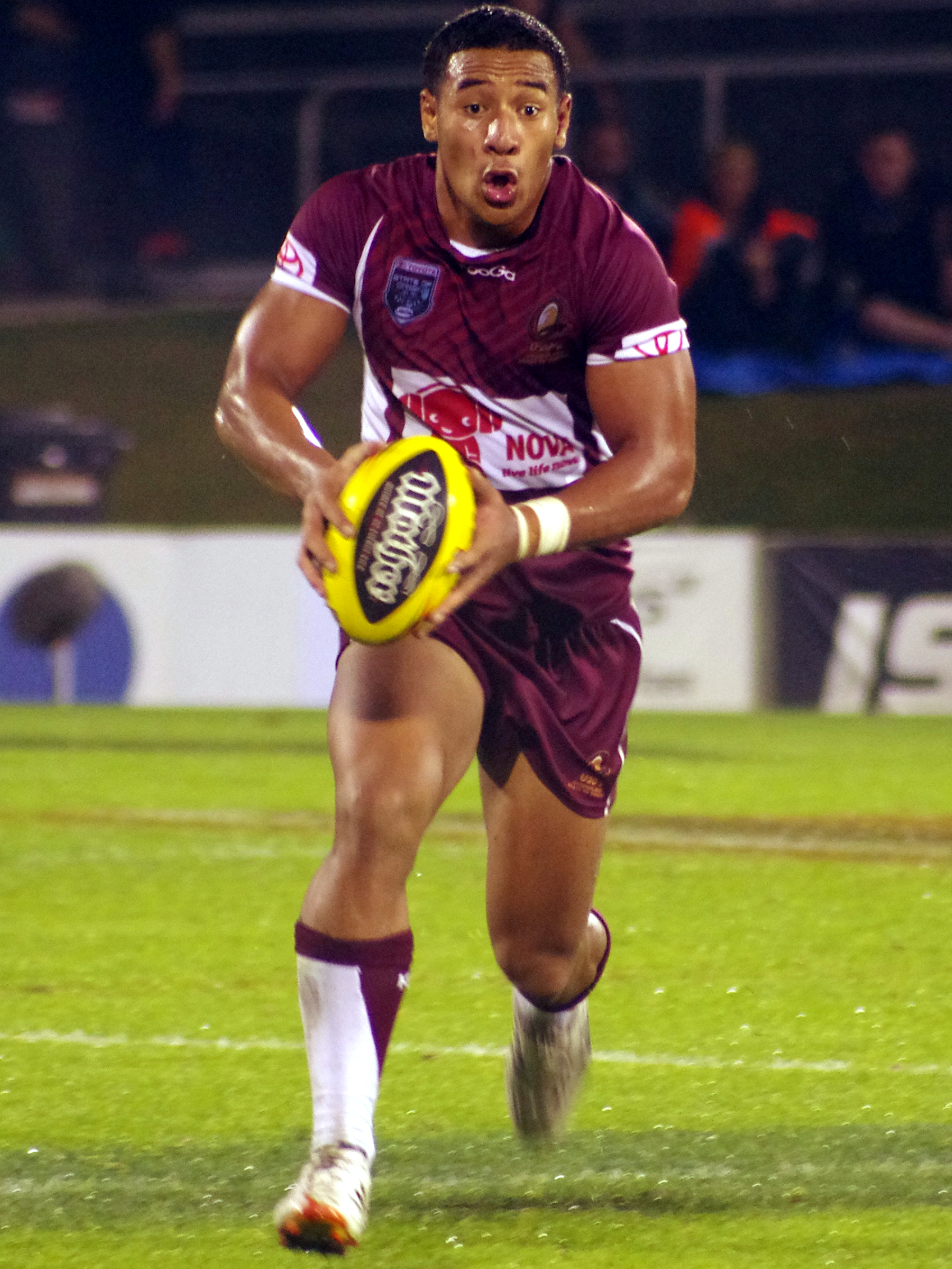
Moga playing for the Queensland under 20s side in 2012

He was selected for Queensland in the inaugural State of Origin Under 20's match at centre in the 18–14 loss against New South Wales at Penrith Stadium.

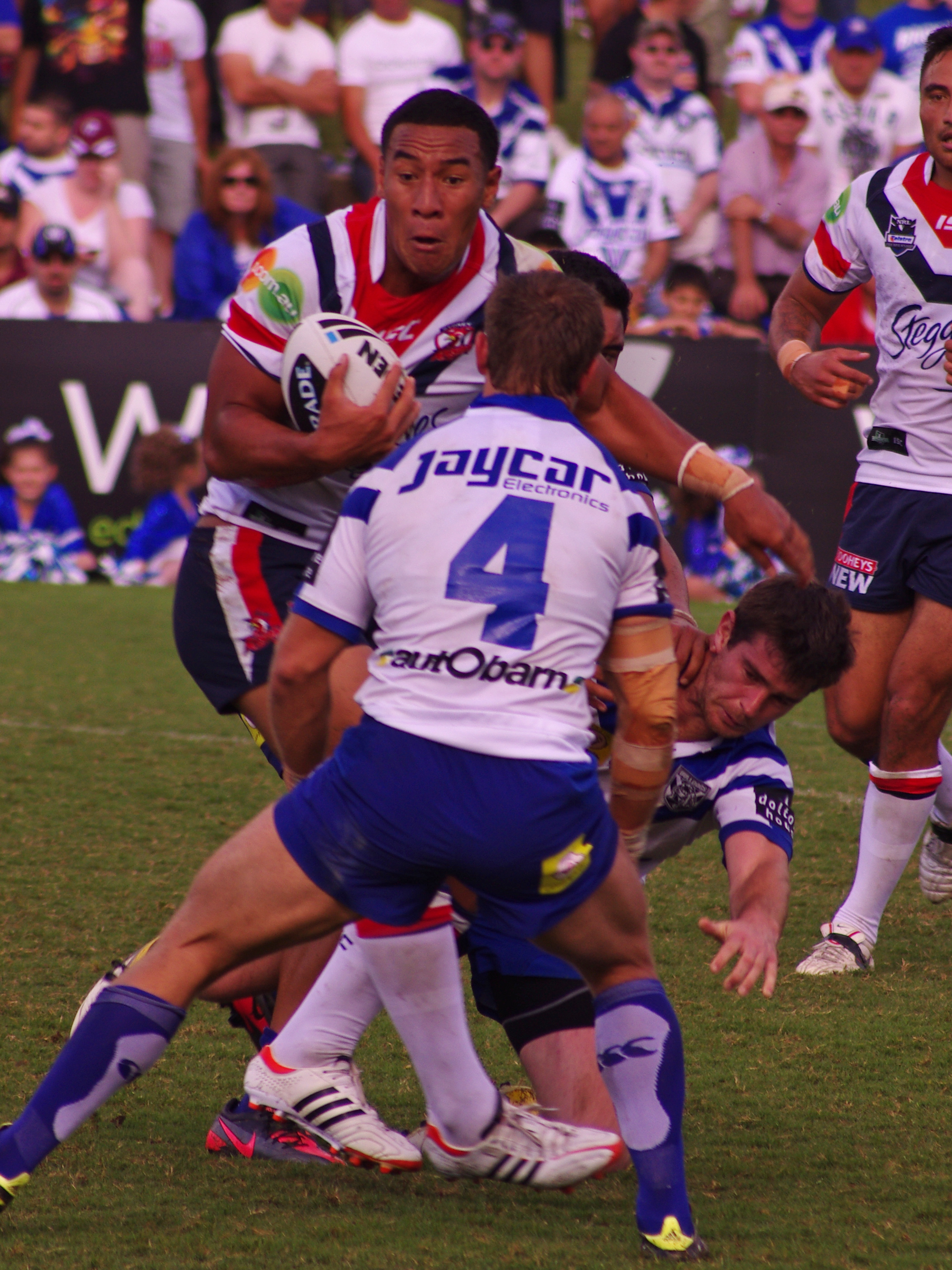
Moga playing for the Sydney Roosters in 2012

In Round 10, Moga made his first grade NRL debut for the Sydney Roosters against the Warriors on the wing, scoring a try in the clubs 30–26 loss at Mt Smart Stadium. Moga played in 14 matches and scored 7 tries in his debut year in the NRL.

=== 2013 ===
Moga spent the season on the sidelines after suffering two anterior cruciate ligament (ACL) injuries. One of the injuries happened while playing in a comeback match in the NYC.

=== 2014 ===
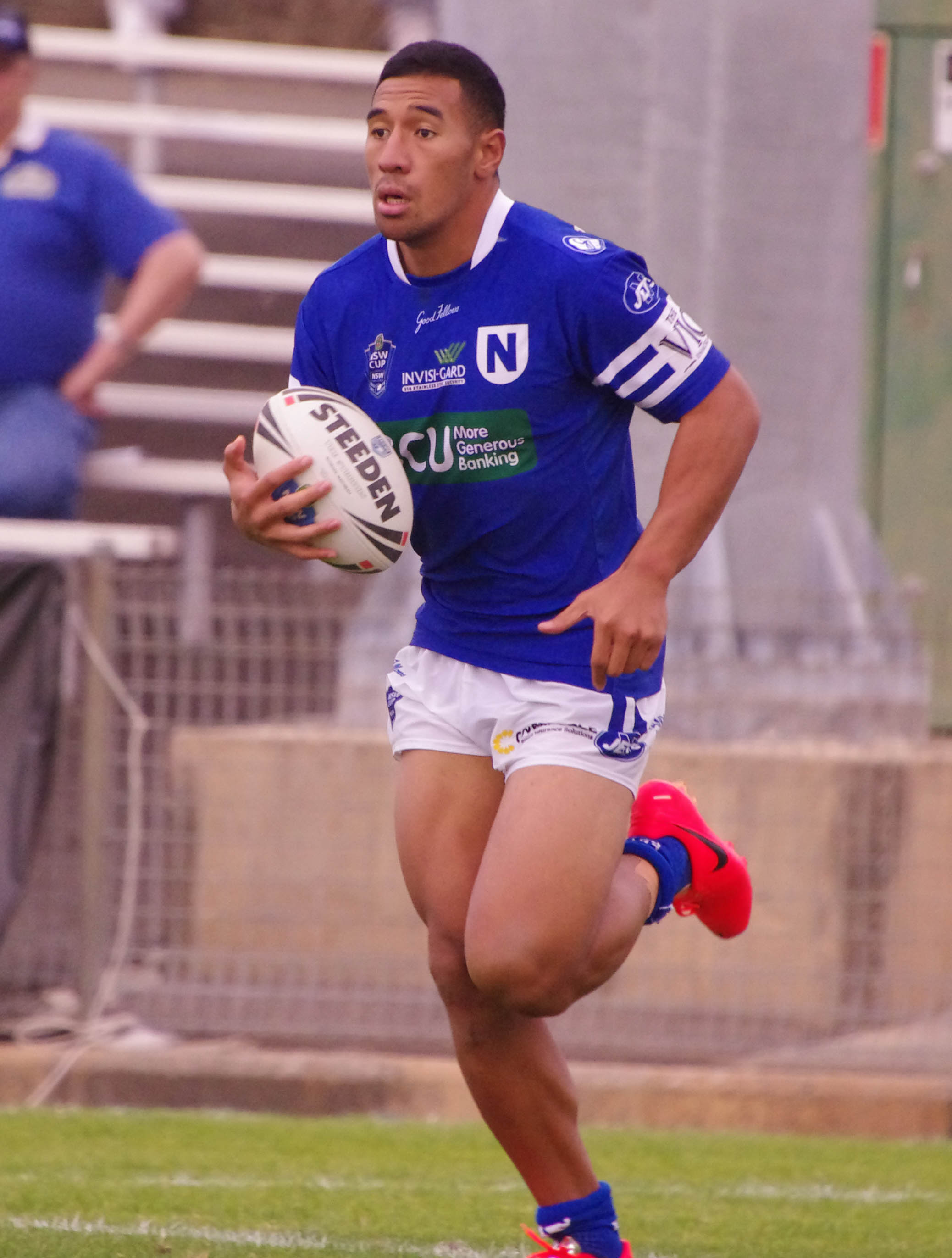
Moga playing for the Newtown Jets in 2014

On 29 June, Moga joined the North Queensland Cowboys mid-season, signing with them until the end of the 2016 season. In Round 17, Moga made his debut for North Queensland against the St. George Illawarra Dragons at centre in the clubs 27–24 loss at Jubilee Oval. In Round 21 against the Gold Coast Titans, Moga scored his first try club for the North Queensland side in the 28–8 win at 1300SMILES Stadium. Moga finished his first year with the North Queensland Cowboys in the 2014 NRL season with him playing in 11 matches and scoring three tries.

On 7 October 2014, Moga was selected for the Samoan 24-man squad for the 2014 Four Nations series.

On 23 October 2014, Moga alongside Samoa teammates Reni Maitua and Sauaso Sue were fined $10,000 for their involvement in a brawl in at a nightclub at Fortitude Valley. The trio were dropped for 2 matches but later returned to play against New Zealand, Moga making his Samoan international debut on the wing and scoring a try in Samoa's 14–12 loss at Toll Stadium in Whangarei, New Zealand. Moga played in 2 matches in the tournament.

=== 2015 ===
Moga played for North Queensland in the 2015 NRL Auckland Nines.

On 2 May, he played for Samoa in their Polynesian Cup clash with Pacific rivals Tonga, playing at fullback in Samoa's 18–16 loss at Cbus Super Stadium. During the match, he tore his Anterior cruciate ligament, having to undergo a third knee reconstruction, ruling him out for the rest of the year.

He finished off the 2015 season early, having played in 6 matches for the North Queensland outfit.

=== 2016 ===
In round 18 of the 2016 season, Moga made his return from injury against the Canberra Raiders.

On 24 October, he signed a two-year contract with the Brisbane Broncos starting in 2017.

=== 2017 ===
In July, after playing in 17 matches for the Brisbane club up to that point, Moga signed a three-year contract with the Newcastle Knights starting in 2018.

=== 2018 ===
In round 1 of the 2018 season, Moga made his debut for the Newcastle side in their 19–18 golden point extra-time win over the Manly-Warringah Sea Eagles. In round 4, he tore his Anterior cruciate ligament while scoring a try in Newcastle's 12–30 loss against the St. George Illawarra Dragons, meaning he would miss the rest of the season after facing his fourth knee reconstruction.

=== 2019 ===
After spending time recovering from his injury and playing in the Canterbury Cup NSW, Moga managed to play in six NRL games for the Newcastle outfit.

=== 2020 ===
In 2020, Moga played four NRL games for the Newcastle club, spending most of the year in Canterbury Cup NSW. In November, he signed a contract with the South Sydney Rabbitohs for 2021.

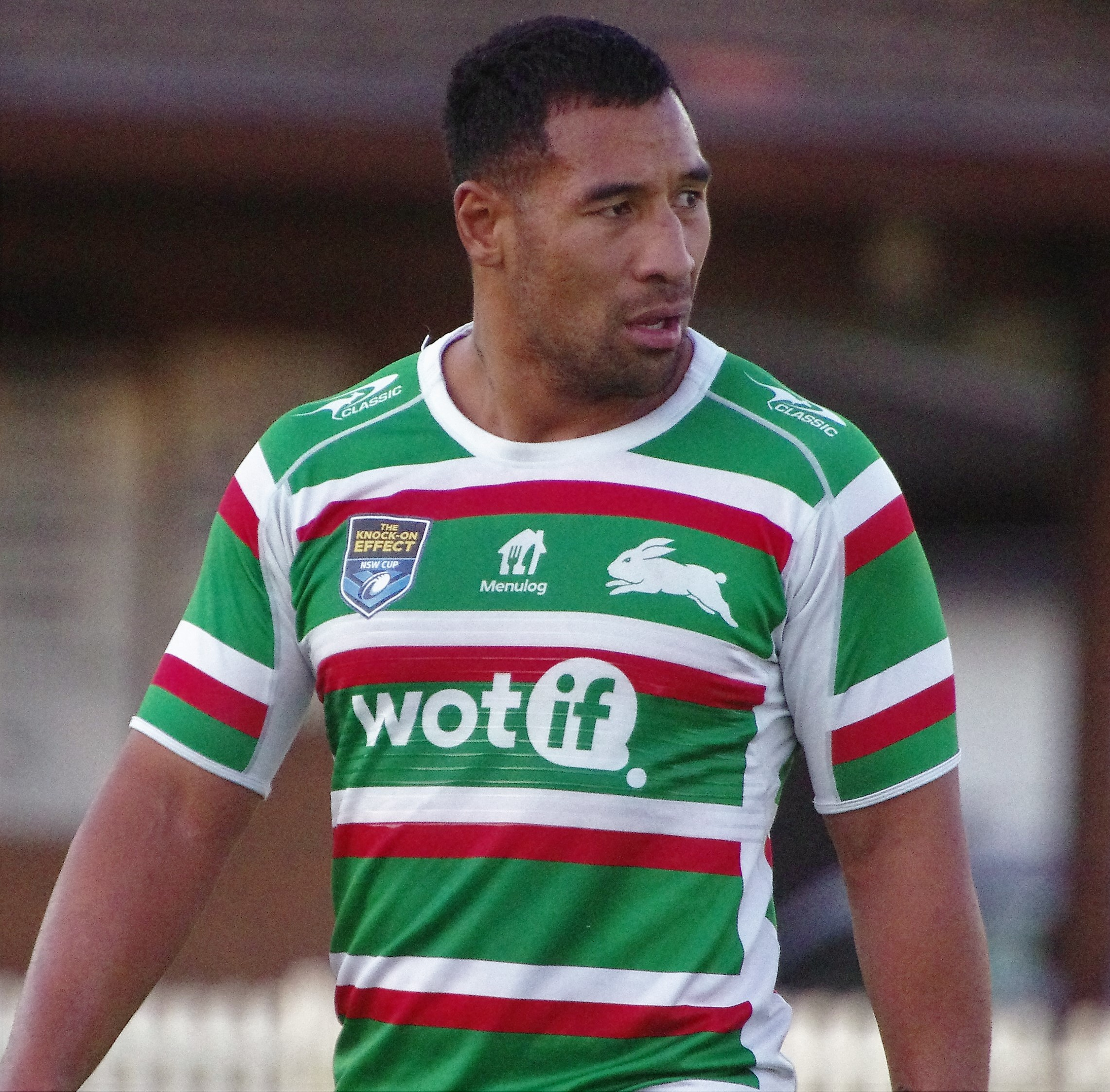
Moga playing for the Rabbitohs in 2021

=== 2021 ===
Moga made only one appearance for South Sydney in the 2021 NRL season.

On 15 October, Moga signed a contract to join St. George Illawarra for the 2022 season

=== 2022 ===
Moga debuted for St. George Illawarra in round 12 of the 2022 NRL season, scoring a try in a 34–24 victory against Canterbury. In round 23, Moga scored a hat-trick in the clubs 46–26 victory over the hapless Gold Coast side. Moga finished the 2022 NRL season playing 10 games and scoring 7 tries, this was the first time he had reached double figures in games in a season since 2017.

On 21 October, Moga re-signed with St. George Illawarra for the 2023 season.

=== 2023 ===
On 16 April in Moga's first game of the 2023 season he scored two tries in St. George Illawarra's 14–20 loss to the Canberra Raiders. In round 8, Moga scored a hat-trick in St. George Illawarra's 27–26 loss to the Sydney Roosters in the ANZAC Day game. On 10 September, it was announced that Moga would be departing St. George Illawarra. He played a total of three games for the club in the 2023 NRL season scoring 7 tries.

=== 2024 ===
On 18 January, it was revealed that Moga had been released by St. George Illawarra after failing to secure a new contract. On 6 October 2024, Moga was one of the players farewelled during the NRL Grand Final tribute to retiring players.

== Post playing ==
As of 2024, Moga was playing for the Wests Devils in the Illawarra competition.

== Alleged assault ==
On 11 January 2019, it was revealed that Moga had been charged by police for common assault. The incident took place on Boxing Day 2018 when Moga slapped a taxi driver twice on the head. According to police, Moga and another man allegedly were refused entry into a King Street, Newcastle pub before getting into the taxi.

Moga's club Newcastle released a statement saying "The Newcastle Knights were made aware of an incident involving a player on 26 December 2018, The club alerted the NRL Integrity Unit at an appropriate time and are co-operating with the NSW Police. No further comment will be made".

In April 2019, Moga was fined $60,000, half of which was suspended, by Newcastle. In March 2019 Moga pleaded guilty to a charge of assault over the incident.

== Statistics ==
=== NRL ===
Statistics are correct to the end of the 2023 season
*denotes season in progress

Season	Team	Matches	T	G	GK %	F/G	Pts
2012	Sydney Roosters	14	7	0	—	0	28
2014	North Queensland Cowboys	11	3	0	—	0	12
2015	North Queensland Cowboys	6	0	0	—	0	0
2016	North Queensland Cowboys	1	0	0	—	0	0
2017	Brisbane Broncos	27	9	0	—	0	36
2018	Newcastle Knights	6	2	0		0	8
2019	Newcastle Knights	4	0	0		0	0
2020	Newcastle Knights	4	0	0		0	0
2021	South Sydney Rabbitohs	1	0	0		0	0
2022	St. George Illawarra Dragons	10	7	0		0	28
2023	St. George Illawarra Dragons	3	6	0		0	24
Career totals		87	36	0	—	0	144

=== International ===
Season	Team	Matches	T	G	GK %	F/G	Pts
2014	Samoa	2	1	0	—	0	4
2015	Samoa	1	0	0	—	0	0
Career totals		3	1	0	—	0	4
