= Blake Ferguson (rugby league) =

Australia international rugby league footballer

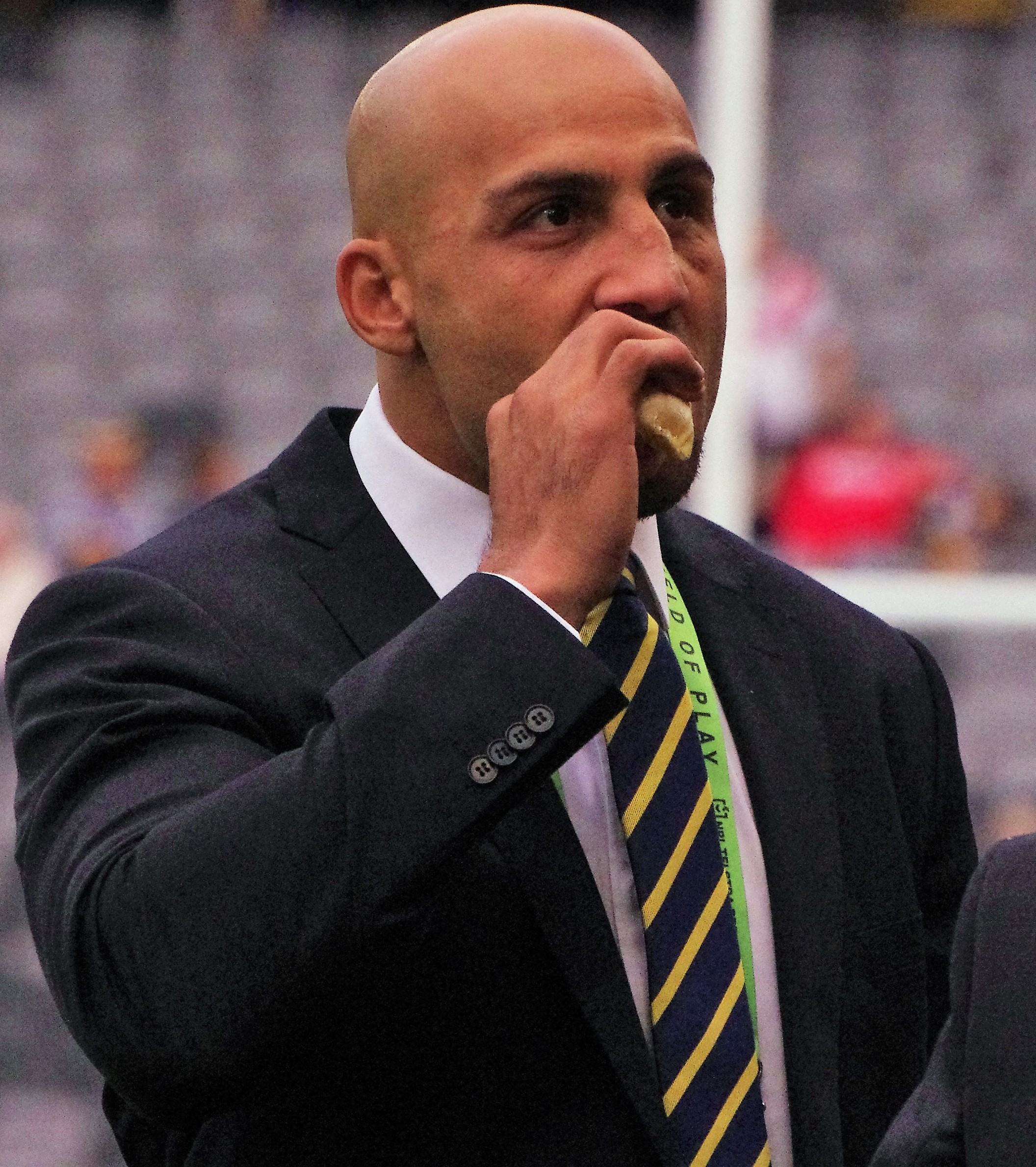

Personal information
- Born: 20 March 1990 (age 36) Wellington, New South Wales, Australia

Playing information
- Height: 191 cm (6 ft 3 in)
- Weight: 102 kg (16 st 1 lb)
- Position: Wing, Centre, Fullback
Club
Years	Team	Pld	T	G	FG	P
2009–10	Cronulla Sharks	42	16	0	0	64
2011–13	Canberra Raiders	60	36	14	0	172
2015–18	Sydney Roosters	91	51	8	0	220
2019–21	Parramatta Eels	57	24	1	0	98
2022	Leigh Centurions	17	21	1	0	86
	Total	267	148	24	0	640
Representative
Years	Team	Pld	T	G	FG	P
2010–21	Indigenous All Stars	6	3	1	0	14
2010–19	Prime Minister's XIII	3	4	0	0	16
2012	Country NSW	1	2	0	0	8
2013–19	New South Wales	9	0	0	0	0
2016–17	Australia	7	6	0	0	24

Blake Ferguson (born 20 March 1990) is an Australian former professional rugby league footballer.

During his rugby league career he represented the Indigenous All Stars, Country NSW, and New South Wales in the State of Origin series. He was a part of the NSW Blues team that won the 2019 State of Origin series. He played for the National Rugby League team the Sydney Roosters that won the 2018 NRL Grand Final.

He previously played for the Cronulla-Sutherland Sharks, Canberra Raiders and Parramatta Eels playing as a centre or fullback earlier in his career. Ferguson is also an amateur boxer.

== Background ==
Ferguson was born in Wellington, NSW on 20 March 1990. Ferguson is a cousin of Anthony Mundine. Ferguson is of Aboriginal descent from Wiradjuri people, and is eligible for the Indigenous All Stars.

He played his junior rugby league at Wellington Cowboys and Earlwood Saints.

== NRL ==
=== Cronulla-Sutherland Sharks ===
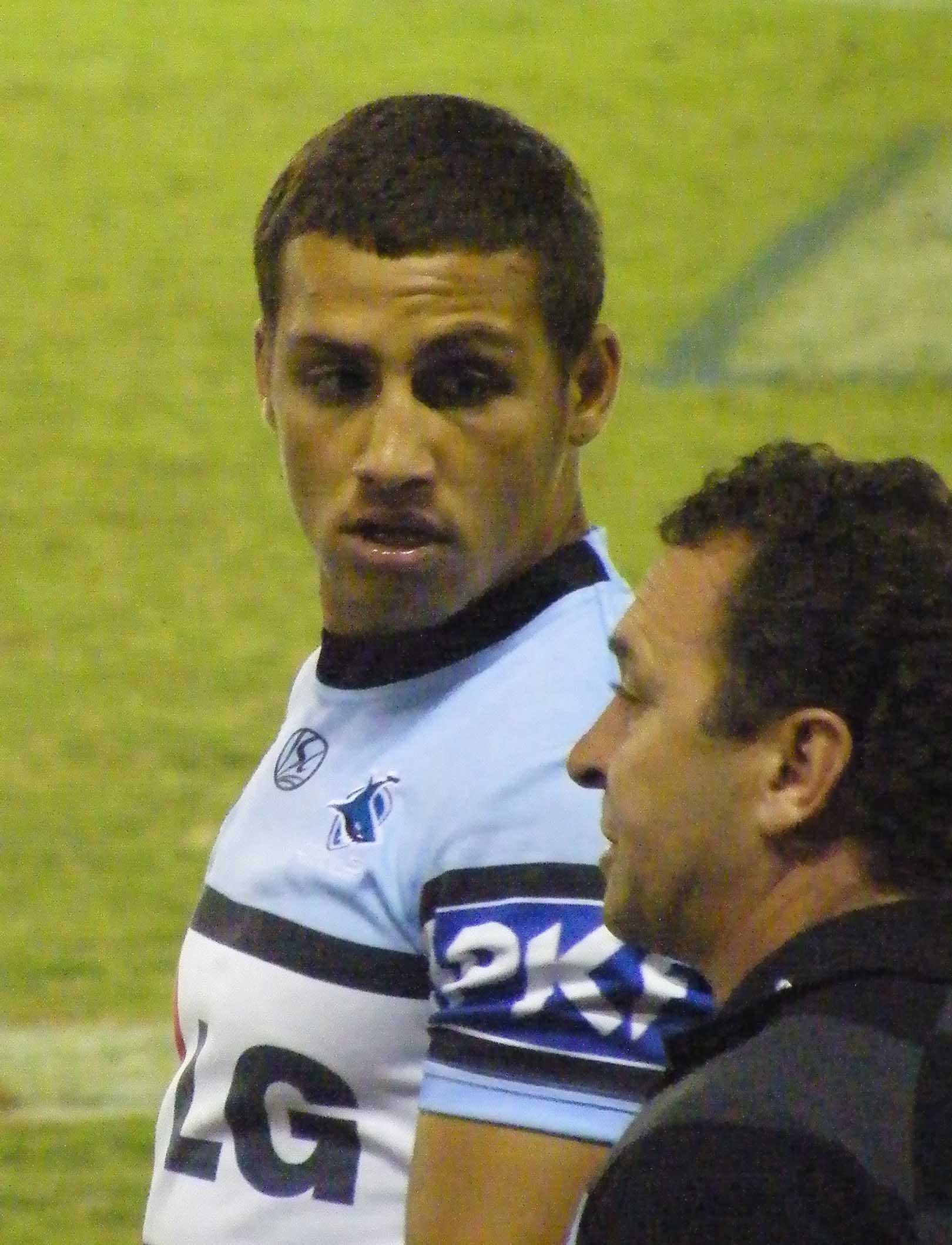
Ferguson playing for Cronulla in 2009

Ferguson was the 2009 Cronulla-Sutherland Sharks season's top try scorer. He was just beaten by Jamal Idris as the rookie of the year at the 2009 Dally M Awards.

Following a clause in his contract that allowed him to leave the Sharks if coach Ricky Stuart left, Ferguson also left the club at the end of 2010.

=== Canberra Raiders ===
Ferguson signed a 2-year deal to play with the Canberra Raiders starting from 2011. He was the Raiders top try-scorer for the season.

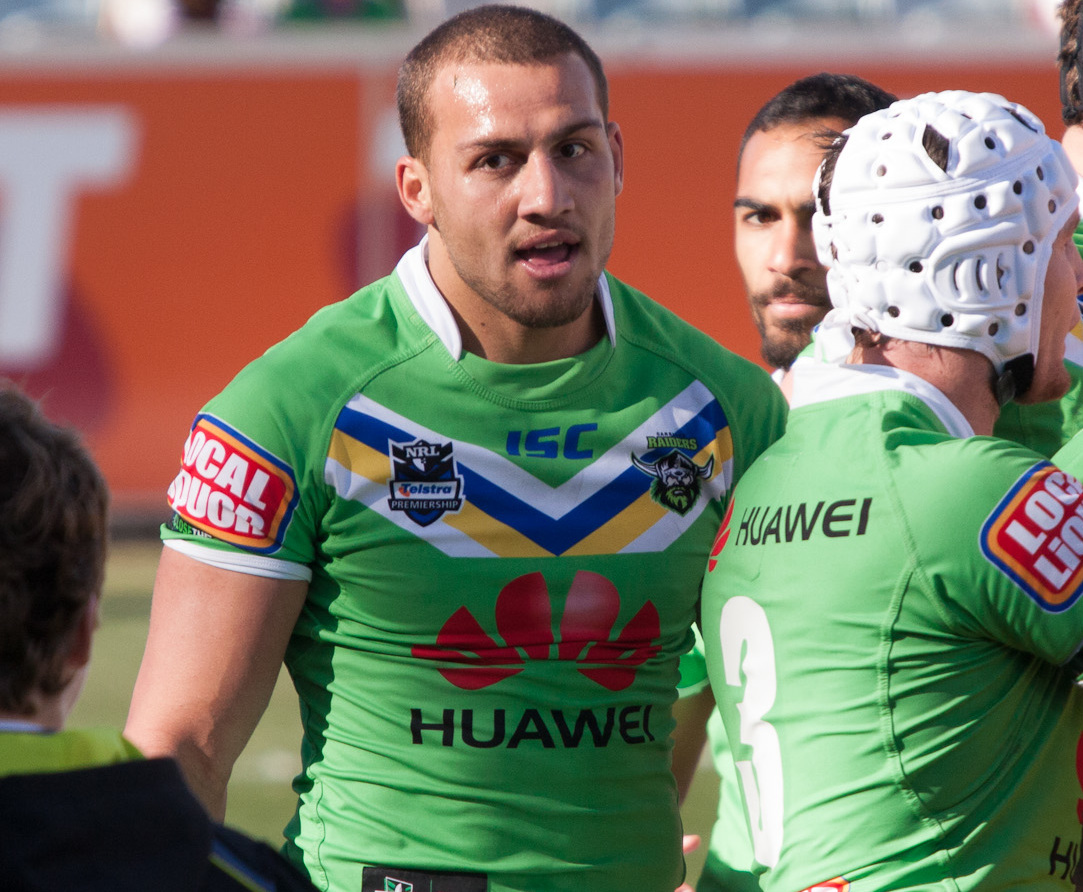
Ferguson playing for the Canberra Raiders in 2012

Following his debut Origin game in 2013 Ferguson's league career took a highly publicised downward spiral following an indecent assault charge. Ferguson finished the 2013 Canberra Raiders season as the club's top try scorer.

=== Sydney Roosters ===
In May 2014, Ferguson signed with the Sydney Roosters, who beat out South Sydney Rabbitohs for his services. However, due to Ferguson's guilty verdict in his 2013 indecent assault charge, the NRL in late June 2014 rejected an application for him to join the Sydney Roosters for the remainder of the 2014 NRL season, meaning he had to wait until the 2015 season to play for his new club. As part of his rehabilitation, Ferguson completed a rugby league refereeing course. He was widely seen as the man to replace Sonny Bill Williams, who departed after the 2014 season.

For the 2015 NRL season Ferguson's healthy form led to Wendell Sailor considering him "the second best buy of the season". Following the departure of Roger Tuivasa-Sheck from the Roosters, after 2015, Ferguson was anointed as the player to replace him at fullback for the 2016 season. However, after just one game at fullback, he was moved back to the centres.

Ferguson was part of the Roosters team that qualified for the finals in 2017. In the qualifying final, Ferguson almost cost his side the game when he chose to bat the ball back into play when it was heading to the sideline enabling Brisbane winger Corey Oates to score a try and put Brisbane in front with minutes to play. The Roosters went on to win the game in the dying minutes thanks to a Latrell Mitchell try. In the preliminary final against North Queensland, Ferguson scored a try off a knock on from North Queensland player Justin O'Neill to make the score 16–12 with less than 15 minutes to play in the match and with Eastern Suburbs in control. In the next play from the restart, Ferguson lost the ball after being hit in a good tackle by O'Neill, who had lost the ball moments earlier. In the following play North Queensland scored courtesy of Kyle Feldt and Easts never recovered losing the match 29–16 in a huge upset.

On 4 July 2018, Ferguson signed a three-year contract to join Parramatta beginning in 2019. Ferguson rejected a similar offer by Newcastle and wanted a new contract with Eastern Suburbs but the club was only prepared to offer him a one-year deal.

In round 25 of the 2018 season, Ferguson scored his 100th try against his future club from 2019 onwards, the Parramatta Eels. His final game for the Roosters was the 2018 NRL Grand Final, in which it was revealed that he had played the second half with a broken leg.

=== Parramatta Eels ===
Ferguson made his debut for Parramatta against Penrith in Round 1 of the 2019 season. Ferguson scored his first and second try for Parramatta the following week against arch rivals Canterbury in a 36–16 victory. In Round 5 against Canberra, Ferguson suffered a badly broken nose and bruised ribs in a 19–0 loss. Ferguson was subsequently ruled out of the following week and missed the club's 51–6 victory over Wests Tigers at the new Western Sydney Stadium.

On 25 July 2019, Ferguson was ruled out of action indefinitely as he had suffered an infection in his knee and required surgery. Ferguson was only expected to initially miss one match. It was reported that Ferguson also suffered a bad reaction to antibiotics. Parramatta coach Brad Arthur spoke to the media saying "His health is our No. 1 priority, We won't play him until he is 100 per cent fit".

After spending 7 weeks out of action, Ferguson returned to the Parramatta side for their round 24 match against the Brisbane Broncos which Brisbane won 17–16 in Golden Point extra-time at Suncorp Stadium. Ferguson scored a second half try in the defeat.

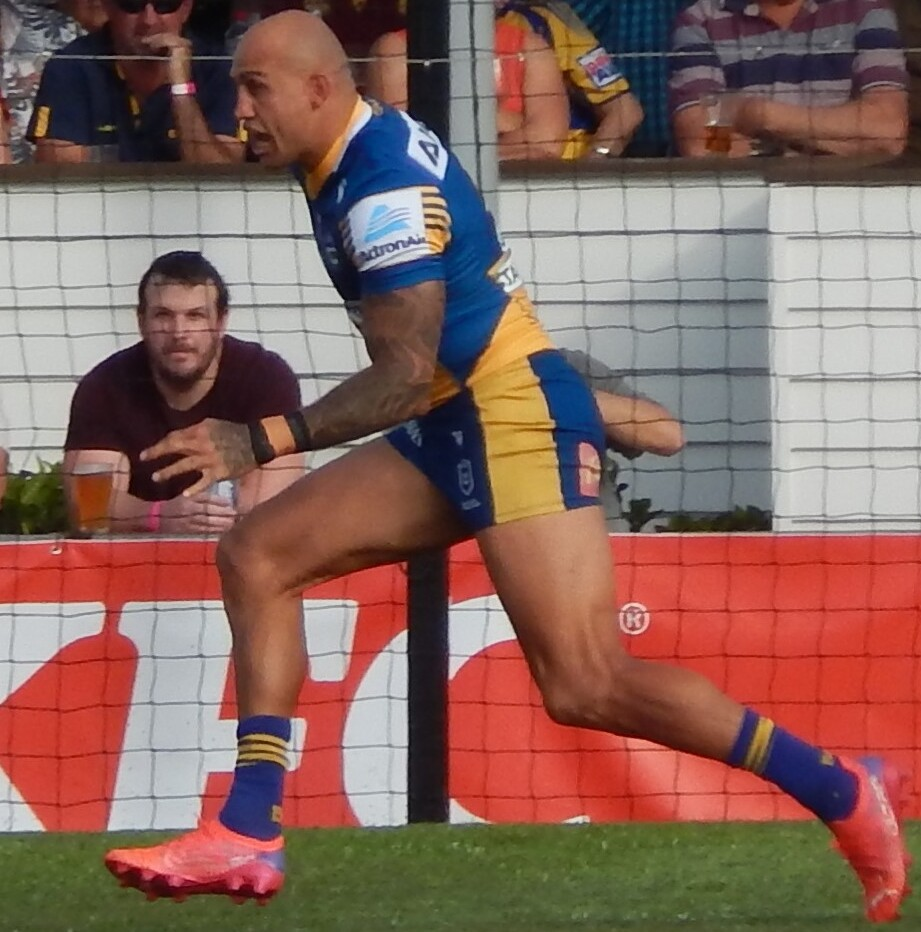
Ferguson playing for the Parramatta Eels in 2021

At the end of the 2019 regular season, Parramatta finished in 5th place on the table and qualified for the finals. In the elimination final against Brisbane, Ferguson scored a try as Parramatta won the match 58–0 at the new Western Sydney Stadium. The victory was the biggest finals win in history, eclipsing Newtown's 55–7 win over St George in 1944. The match was also Parramatta's biggest win over Brisbane and Brisbane's worst ever loss since entering the competition in 1988.

On 30 September, Ferguson was named at wing for the Australia PM XIII side.

In round 17 of the 2020 NRL season, Ferguson scored his first try of the year as Parramatta defeated the New Zealand Warriors 24–18 at the Central Coast Stadium. It was Ferguson's first try in nearly 12 months with his previous try coming against Brisbane in the 2019 elimination final.

In round 3 of the 2021 NRL season, he scored two tries in a 28–4 victory over Cronulla-Sutherland. The following week in round 4, he scored two tries for Parramatta in a 36–22 victory over the Wests Tigers at Stadium Australia. Ferguson then experienced a mid-season form slump, which resulted in him being overlooked for selection in the NSW State of Origin side for Game One of the series, as well as being dropped from the Parramatta side for their Round 12 game against the Newcastle Knights.

After spending seven weeks in the NSW Cup, Ferguson was recalled to the Parramatta side for their round 19 match against Canberra. Ferguson set up a second half try for Parramatta during the game which they lost 12–10.

In round 24, Ferguson scored two tries for Parramatta in a 22–10 victory over Melbourne. The win also ended Melbourne's 19-game winning streak.

In week one of the 2021 Finals Series, Ferguson scored two tries for Parramatta in their 28-20 elimination final victory over Newcastle. Ferguson's final game for Parramatta came the following week as the club lost to Penrith 8–6 in the elimination final. On 22 September 2021, Ferguson was released by the Parramatta club.

=== Rugby union in Japan ===
Ferguson moved to Japan in October 2021 to play for the NEC Green Rockets rugby union team, but was arrested on 30 December, prior to appearing in a single match, on suspicion of possessing illegal cocaine after an altercation at a Roppongi restaurant. Ferguson spent 29 nights in a Japanese prison following the incident. He pled guilty in a Japanese court on 3 March 2022, and thereafter returned to Australia, where he unsuccessfully tried to secure an NRL contract and at one point interviewed for a coal mining job outside Sydney.

=== Leigh ===
On 29 April 2022, RFL Championship side Leigh announced that they had signed Ferguson on a one-year deal until the end of the season. On 23 May 2022, Ferguson made his club debut for Leigh and scored four tries as they defeated Workington Town 58-6. On 28 May 2022, Ferguson won his first trophy with Leigh, defeating Featherstone 30-16 in the RFL 1895 Cup final at the Tottenham Hotspur Stadium. On 28 August 2022, Ferguson scored two tries for Leigh in a 42-4 win over Widnes. On 3 October 2022, Ferguson played for Leigh in their Million Pound Game victory over Batley which saw the club promoted back to the Super League.

=== Kurri Kurri Bulldogs ===
On 3 October 2023, it was reported that he had joined Kurri Kurri Bulldogs. On 26 April 2024 it was reported that his contract had been terminated due to gross misconduct. The following day, Ferguson signed for a new club, the Wellington Cowboys.

== Representative career ==
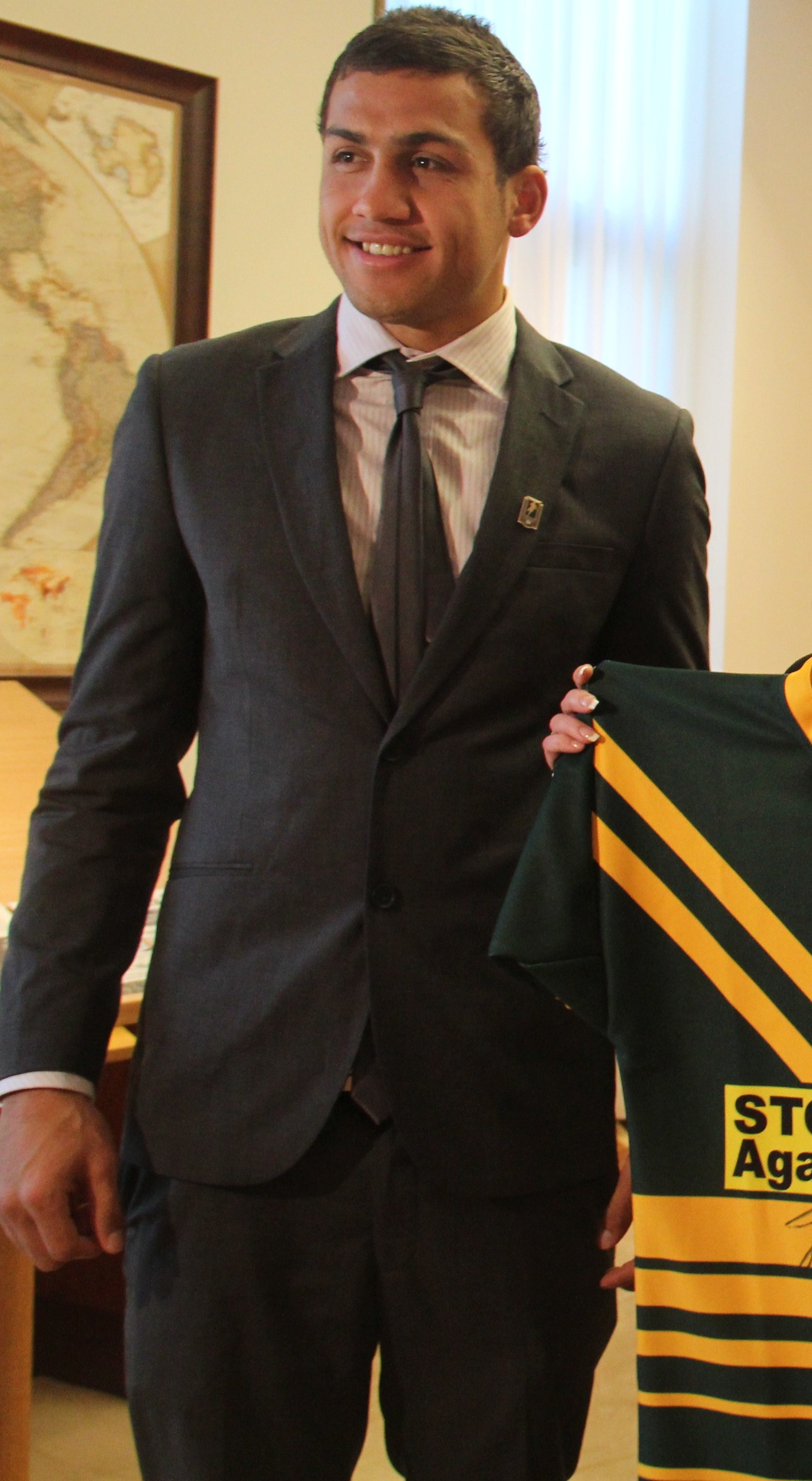
Ferguson representing the Prime Ministers XIII in 2011

=== All Stars ===
In 2010, he was called up to play for the Indigenous All-Stars, replacing the injured Justin Hodges. In that match he famously ran down Israel Folau. Ferguson was previously managed by his uncle Solomon Haumono and is now managed by Sam Ayoub.

=== Country ===
In 2012, Ferguson had one of his best seasons on the field, representing the Country New South Wales rugby league team.

=== New South Wales ===
In 2013, Ferguson made his debut for the New South Wales rugby league team in Game I of the 2013 State of Origin series. He had previously been approached by Queensland rugby league team coach Mal Meninga to play for Queensland.

In the 2018 NRL season, Ferguson was not selected for the 2018 State of Origin series with coach Brad Fittler opting to select wingers Josh Addo-Carr and Tom Trbojevic instead. Fittler had publicly stated to the media before the team selection that NSW needed to change its "selfish culture". Despite Ferguson's strong 2018 form, the 28-year-old's non-selection was no great shock given the players infamous afternoon at a pub with Josh Dugan five days out from the 2017 series decider.

After missing out on selection for New South Wales in 2018, Ferguson was selected for Game 2 of the 2019 State of Origin series which New South Wales would go on to win 38–6 at Optus Stadium in Perth. Ferguson was retained for Game 3 of the series which was played at ANZ Stadium in the deciding match. With 1 minute left of normal time and with the scores at 20–20, Ferguson made a break down the right-hand side of the field and beat the covering tackle of Corey Norman. Ferguson then passed to James Tedesco who crossed over for the series-winning try with 20 seconds of play left.

=== Australia ===
In 2012 he made the Australia train-on squad.

On 6 May 2016, Ferguson made his international debut for Australia against New Zealand in the 2016 Anzac Test, scoring a try on debut.

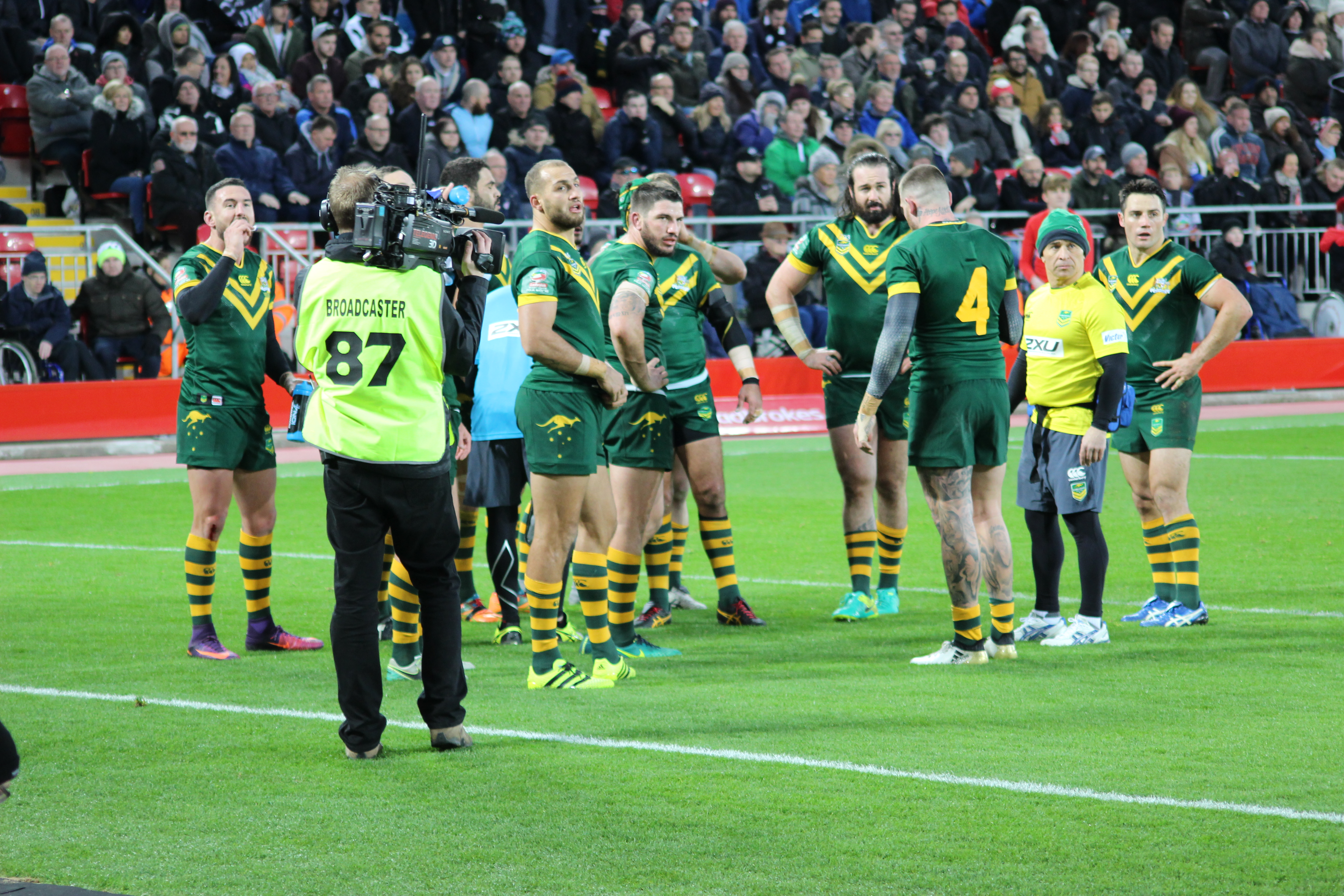
Ferguson playing for Australia

== Boxing ==
Ferguson made his professional boxing debut on 27 November 2013 in a fight against Luke Turner.

== Personal life and controversies ==
Blake has been disciplined for several incidents of off-field behaviour. At a music festival in November 2012, he was escorted by security staff out of a VIP area after reports that he had been spitting on patrons. The Raiders refused to answer specific questions about the incident but stated that "We are aware of the incident and Blake has been disciplined internally." He was also fined by the NRL after breaking their drinking policy.

On 17 June 2013, Ferguson was apprehended and charged by police for an alleged Indecent Assault at the Sutherland Shire nightclub 2230. On 6 September 2013 the Canberra Raiders sacked Ferguson. On 11 December 2013, Ferguson was found guilty of June's indecent assault charge. Ferguson had pleaded not guilty arguing that he had mistaken the woman for 'another blonde woman' he had met earlier that evening at a different venue, 'Northies' but Ferguson was found guilty, placed on a good behaviour bond, and ordered to stay away from nightclubs and alcohol. He was also suspended from football for more than 2 years.

He converted to Islam in 2013, after taking his shahada with his cousin, Mundine, who has been a Muslim for many years. He also briefly gave up alcohol.

In December 2017, it was revealed that Ferguson had admitted himself into a rehabilitation centre to overcome a gambling addiction.

On 30 December 2021, Ferguson was arrested in Tokyo for assaulting a patron in a restaurant and for being in possession of cocaine. He was in Tokyo to start a new career with NEC Green Rockets. He was subsequently sacked by the Green Rockets.
