= Emma Young =

Australian architect (born 1971)

Emma Young (born 1971) is an Australian architect.

== Early life and education ==
Young was born in Sydney in 1971. She attended James Ruse Agricultural High School from 1983 to 1988, then completed a Bachelor of Science (Environmental Design) at the University of Canberra before completing a Bachelor of Architecture at RMIT University in 1999.

== Early life and career ==
Prior to establishing PHOOEY Architects with her partner Peter Ho in 2002, Emma worked in a number of renowned Melbourne architectural practices including Max May, Rijavec Architects, Lyons and Places Victoria. In recognition of their contribution to awareness of sustainability and re-use of materials throughout their projects, Young with her partner Ho have received awards both nationally and internationally, including the RAIA National Award for Small Project Architecture in 2008. In 2013, Young was an invited speaker at Material, the Australian Institute of Architects National Conference in Melbourne. In 2014, she was an invited speaker at the CMS Design Experience Series in New Zealand.

Emma Young is currently in practice at PHOOEY Architects with her partner Peter Ho, in Melbourne.

== Key projects ==
Cubo house is a renovated 1880s heritage-listed house in Fitzroy North, VIC. Inspiration for the house came from the 'cultural memory of the existing building' combined with PHOOEY's commitment to sustainability. The house has sustainable features including passive & active solar systems and rainwater harvesting for re-use. Many materials from the original house have been upcycled and reused. To do this PHOOEY made an inventory of materials and items removed from the project. All the removed windows were repositioned to create a three-storey window-wall which also acts as a light-well to the new basement level. In front of the window wall in the centre of the new spiral staircase, hangs a chandelier made of the original stair parts. Security screens re-emerged as a privacy screen and sun shades, the bluestone fire hearth was once the doorstep and the salvaged timber flooring is now face kitchen joinery. Original slate roof tiles and bricks were integrated into the facade. The rear façade and internal joinery details were informed using the surrealist technique of Cubomania. This involved cutting photos of the original building into squares and rearranging them to produce a resolved floor and facade layout.

Kaleidoscope is a two-bedroom apartment in Melbourne located within an old warehouse complex. It sits on the second level, above an artist and industrial design studio. It has no garden access so a glazed wall surrounding an internal courtyard acts as a lightwell with light filtered through red, orange and yellow hued windows above glass doors. Original roof trusses were retained and painted black, contrasting with new white raked ceilings. The design also retained existing timber flooring. The glazing and kitchen laminates are organised chromatically to create the effect of an unravelled kaleidoscope.

Children's Activity Centre, located in South Melbourne is constructed from four shipping containers joined together. Two large at the bottom and two smaller at the top. The design by PHOOEY minimises waste along with the embodied energy of the materials. The container doors are used as balcony ends, the removed side walls are cut into balustrades and awnings. The project uses most of the remnants and off-cuts generated by the construction process.

== Awards ==
- Edna Walling Award for Residential Designed Landscape – Winner 2014. Australian Institute of Landscape Architects (VIC) In collaboration with Simon Ellis Landscape Architects.
- Bruce Mackenzie Landscape Award – Finalist 2014. Think Brick Awards (National) In collaboration with Simon Ellis Landscape Architects.
- Houses Awards – Outdoor – Commendation 2014. Houses Awards (National) In collaboration with Simon Ellis Landscape Architects.
- Residential Alterations & Additions Award – Commendation 2014. Australian Institute of Architects (VIC).
- Green Dot Award – Residential Built – Honorable Mention 2013. 6th Annual Green Dot (International) Awards.
- Westpac Bank Ruby Award – Winner 2011. Westpac Bank, Elizabeth Street, Melbourne.
- National Award for Small Project Architecture – Winner 2008. Australian Institute of Architects (National), Cubo House.
- Award for Small Project Architecture – Winner 2008. Australian Institute of Architects (VIC).
- Sustainability Award – Winner 2008. Australian Institute of Architects (VIC).
- Premier's Design Mark for Cultural Architecture – Winner 2008. Premier's Design Awards, State of Victoria.
- Outstanding Public Building – High Commendation 2008. Architectural & Design Excellence in the South East Awards, South East Development.
- Mayor's Award – Winner 2009. Tenth Design & Development Awards, City of Port Phillip.
- AA Prize for Unbuilt Work – Special Mention 2010. Architecture Australia.
- Building of the Year – Winner 2008. 3RRR FM.
- AR Awards for Emerging Architecture – Honorable Mention 2007. The Architectural Review (UK).
- Building of the Year – High Commendation 2008. World Architecture Festival (Spain).
- Leadership in Sustainable Buildings – Finalist 2005. Banksia Environmental Awards, Banksia Foundation
- Green Building Award – Finalist 2005. World Environment Day Awards, United Nations Association of Australia.
- Merit Award for Environment in Landscape Architecture – Winner 2004. Australian Institute of Landscape Architects (VIC).
- Year of the Built Environment National Awards – Exemplar 2004. Exemplar in 4 x categories: Design for All, Excellence in Building, Imagining the Future, Towards Sustainable Communities.
