= 2019 Newcastle Knights season =

- NRL Rank: 11th
- 2019 record: Wins: 10; draws: 0; losses: 14
- Points scored: For: 485; against: 522

Team information
- CEO: Phil Gardner
- Coach: Nathan Brown then Kristian Woolf (interim)
- Captain: Mitchell Pearce
- Stadium: McDonald Jones Stadium
- Avg. attendance: 19,053
- High attendance: 25,929 (vs. Roosters, round 11)

Top scorers
- Tries: Kalyn Ponga (11)
- Goals: Kalyn Ponga (48)
- Points: Kalyn Ponga (140)
← 2018	2020 →

The 2019 Newcastle Knights season was the 32nd in the club's history. Coached by Nathan Brown, interim coached by Kristian Woolf after Brown's contract was terminated, and captained by Mitchell Pearce, they competed in the NRL's 2019 Telstra Premiership, finishing the regular season in 11th place (out of 16).

== Milestones ==
- Round 1: James Gavet made his debut for the club, after previously playing for the New Zealand Warriors.
- Round 1: Tim Glasby made his debut for the club, after previously playing for the Melbourne Storm and scored his 1st try for the club.
- Round 1: Hymel Hunt made his debut for the club, after previously playing for the South Sydney Rabbitohs.
- Round 1: David Klemmer made his debut for the club, after previously playing for the Canterbury-Bankstown Bulldogs.
- Round 1: Edrick Lee made his debut for the club, after previously playing for the Cronulla-Sutherland Sharks and scored his 1st try for the club.
- Round 1: Kurt Mann made his debut for the club, after previously playing for the St. George Illawarra Dragons.
- Round 1: Jesse Ramien made his debut for the club, after previously playing for the Cronulla-Sutherland Sharks.
- Round 3: Hymel Hunt played his 50th career game.
- Round 3: Jesse Ramien scored his 1st try for the club.
- Round 4: Hymel Hunt scored his 1st try for the club.
- Round 4: Edrick Lee scored his 50th career try.
- Round 4: Mason Lino made his debut for the club, after previously playing for the New Zealand Warriors.
- Round 6: Mitchell Barnett kicked his 1st career goal.
- Round 7: James Gavet scored his 1st try for the club.
- Round 9: Lachlan Fitzgibbon played his 50th career game.
- Round 9: Edrick Lee played his 100th career game.
- Round 10: Nathan Brown won his 100th career game as coach.
- Round 10: Kurt Mann scored his 1st try for the club.
- Round 13: Mason Lino kicked his 1st goal for the club.
- Round 13: Sione Mata'utia played his 100th career game.
- Round 15: Mason Lino scored his 1st try for the club.
- Round 16: Phoenix Crossland made his NRL debut for the club.
- Round 16: Shaun Kenny-Dowall captained his 1st game for the club.
- Round 16: Kurt Mann played his 100th career game.
- Round 21: Shaun Kenny-Dowall played his 50th game for the club.
- Round 21: Jacob Saifiti played his 50th career game.
- Round 22: Josh King played his 50th career game.
- Round 23: Bradman Best made his NRL debut for the club.
- Round 24: Bradman Best scored his 1st career try.
- Round 25: Starford To'a made his NRL debut for the club and scored his 1st career try.

== Squad ==
Newcastle Knights
2019 NRL premiership (Top 30) squad			Development players	Coaching staff
253 Sione Mata'utia – LK, SR, CE, FE; 260 Danny Levi – HK; 261 Lachlan Fitzgibbon – SR, FE; 262 Nathan Ross – WG (mid-season retirement); 268 Daniel Saifiti – PR; 269 Jacob Saifiti – PR; 273 Josh King – PR, LK; 276 Mitchell Barnett – SR, PR, LK, CE, FE (gk); 279 Jamie Buhrer (vc) – SR, LK, HK; 282 Sam Stone – SR (mid-season loss); 287 Shaun Kenny-Dowall (vc) – WG	289 Herman Ese'ese – PR, LK; 290 Slade Griffin – HK; 291 Aidan Guerra – LK, PR, SR; 294 Tautau Moga – CE; 295 Mitchell Pearce (c) – HB; 296 Kalyn Ponga – FB, FE (gk); 297 Connor Watson – HK, FE, FB, CE; 300 Pasami Saulo – PR; 302 James Gavet – PR; 303 Tim Glasby – LK, PR, SR; 304 Hymel Hunt – CE, WG	305 David Klemmer – PR, LK; 306 Edrick Lee – WG; 307 Kurt Mann – FE, FB, WG, HK, CE; 308 Jesse Ramien – CE (mid-season loss); 309 Mason Lino – FE, HB, HK (gk); 310 Phoenix Crossland – FE; 311 Bradman Best – CE, WG; 312 Starford To'a – WG; 000 Beau Fermor – SR; 000 Brodie Jones – SR; 000 Zac Woolford – HK	Tex Hoy – FB; Jirah Momoisea – PR; Brayden Musgrove – CE; Chris Randall – HK; Extended squad players: Mitch Andrews – CE; Kiah Cooper – CE; Mat Croker – LK; Sale Finau – FB (pre-season loss); Jacob Gagai – WG; Luke Huth – HK; Simi Sasagi – FE	Head coach: Nathan Brown (mid-season termination); Assistant coaches: Kristian Woolf (interim head coach); James Shepherd; Rory Kostjasyn - Canterbury Cup NSW coach; Scott Dureau - Jersey Flegg Cup coach; Legend: (c) Captain(s); (vc) Vice-captain(s); Updated: 9 September 2019; Source(s): Newcastle Knights Profiles, Rugby League Project

== Transfers and Re-signings ==
=== Gains ===
Player/Coach	Previous club	Length
Sale Finau	Melbourne Storm	2019
James Gavet	New Zealand Warriors	2020
Tim Glasby	Melbourne Storm	2021
Hymel Hunt	South Sydney Rabbitohs	2019
David Klemmer	Canterbury-Bankstown Bulldogs	2023
Edrick Lee	Cronulla-Sutherland Sharks	2021
Mason Lino	New Zealand Warriors	2020
Kurt Mann	St. George Illawarra Dragons	2021
Jesse Ramien	Cronulla-Sutherland Sharks	2020
Kristian Woolf (assistant coach & interim head coach)	Townsville Blackhawks	2019
Zac Woolford	Canterbury-Bankstown Bulldogs	2019

=== Losses ===
Player/Coach	Club
Tyrone Amey	Maitland Pickers
Jack Cogger	Canterbury-Bankstown Bulldogs
Matt Cooper	Eastern Suburbs Tigers
Thomas Cronan	South Newcastle Lions
Cory Denniss	South Sydney Rabbitohs
JJ Felise	Canberra Raiders
Christian Hazard	Tweed Heads Seagulls
Chris Heighington	Retirement
Trent Hodkinson	Cronulla-Sutherland Sharks
Tom Hughes	Eastern Suburbs Tigers
Jack Johns	South Sydney Rabbitohs
Brock Lamb	Sydney Roosters
Jacob Lillyman	Retirement
Todd Lowrie (Jersey Flegg Cup coach)	Released
Jock Madden	Wests Tigers
Chanel Mata'utia	Cessnock Goannas
Pat Mata'utia	Western Suburbs Rosellas
Nick Meaney	Canterbury-Bankstown Bulldogs
Brent Naden	Penrith Panthers
Dylan Phythian	Contract terminated
Michael Potter (assistant coach)	Released
Ken Sio	Salford Red Devils
Tom Starling	Canberra Raiders
Simon Woolford (ISP NSW coach)	Huddersfield Giants
Luke Yates	London Broncos

=== Promoted juniors ===
Player	Junior side
Mitch Andrews	Knights Jersey Flegg Cup
Bradman Best	Knights Jersey Flegg Cup
Kiah Cooper	Knights Intrust Super Premiership NSW
Mat Croker	Knights Jersey Flegg Cup
Phoenix Crossland	Knights Jersey Flegg Cup
Beau Fermor	Knights Jersey Flegg Cup
Jacob Gagai	Knights Intrust Super Premiership NSW
Tex Hoy	Knights Jersey Flegg Cup
Luke Huth	Knights Jersey Flegg Cup
Jirah Momoisea	Knights Jersey Flegg Cup
Chris Randall	Knights Intrust Super Premiership NSW
Simi Sasagi	Knights Jersey Flegg Cup
Starford To'a	Knights Jersey Flegg Cup

=== Change of role ===
Player/Coach	New role
Scott Dureau (S. G. Ball Cup coach)	Knights Jersey Flegg Cup coach
Zac Hosking	Knights second-tier squad

=== Re-signings ===
Player/Coach	Re-signed to
Bradman Best	2022
Phoenix Crossland	2021
Beau Fermor	2020
Lachlan Fitzgibbon	2021
Tex Hoy	2021
Jirah Momoisea	2020
Simi Sasagi	2020
Starford To'a	2021

=== Player contract situations ===
2019 (left)	2020	2021	2022	2023
Mitch Andrews	Mitchell Barnett	Phoenix Crossland	Bradman Best	David Klemmer
Jamie Buhrer	Mat Croker	Lachlan Fitzgibbon		
Kiah Cooper	Herman Ese'ese	Tim Glasby		
Sale Finau	Beau Fermor	Tex Hoy		
Jacob Gagai	Aidan Guerra	Edrick Lee		
James Gavet	Hymel Hunt	Kurt Mann		
Slade Griffin	Luke Huth	Sione Mata'utia		
Shaun Kenny-Dowall	Brodie Jones	Mitchell Pearce		
Brayden Musgrove	Josh King	Kalyn Ponga		
Jesse Ramien	Danny Levi	Starford To'a		
Nathan Ross	Mason Lino			
Sam Stone	Tautau Moga			
Zac Woolford	Jirah Momoisea			
	Chris Randall			
	Daniel Saifiti			
	Jacob Saifiti			
	Simi Sasagi			
	Pasami Saulo			
	Connor Watson			

== Ladder ==
2019 NRL season
Pos	Team	Pld	W	D	L	B	PF	PA	PD	Pts
1	Melbourne Storm	24	20	0	4	1	631	300	+331	42
2	Sydney Roosters	24	17	0	7	1	627	363	+264	36
3	South Sydney Rabbitohs	24	16	0	8	1	521	417	+104	34
4	Canberra Raiders	24	15	0	9	1	524	374	+150	32
5	Parramatta Eels	24	14	0	10	1	533	473	+60	30
6	Manly-Warringah Sea Eagles	24	14	0	10	1	496	446	+50	30
7	Cronulla-Sutherland Sharks	24	12	0	12	1	514	464	+50	26
8	Brisbane Broncos	24	11	1	12	1	432	489	−57	25
9	Wests Tigers	24	11	0	13	1	475	486	−11	24
10	Penrith Panthers	24	11	0	13	1	413	474	−61	24
11	Newcastle Knights	24	10	0	14	1	485	522	−37	22
12	Canterbury-Bankstown Bulldogs	24	10	0	14	1	326	477	−151	22
13	New Zealand Warriors	24	9	1	14	1	433	574	−141	21
14	North Queensland Cowboys	24	9	0	15	1	378	500	−122	20
15	St. George Illawarra Dragons	24	8	0	16	1	427	575	−148	18
16	Gold Coast Titans	24	4	0	20	1	370	651	−281	10

== Jerseys and sponsors ==
In 2019, the Knights' jerseys were made by ISC and their major sponsor is nib Health Funds.

2019 Home Jersey	2019 Away Jersey	2019 Indigenous Jersey	2019 NSW Mining Jersey

== Fixtures ==
=== Pre-season trials ===
Date	Round	Opponent	Venue	Score	Tries	Goals	Attendance
Saturday, 23 February	Trial 1	St. George Illawarra Dragons	WIN Stadium	10 – 18	L.Fitzgibbon, E.Lee	K.Ponga (1/2)	
Saturday, 2 March	Trial 2	Cronulla-Sutherland Sharks	Maitland No.1 Sportsground	6 – 30	S.To'a	K.Ponga (1/1)	
Legend: Win Loss Draw

=== Regular season ===
Date	Round	Opponent	Venue	Score	Tries	Goals	Attendance
15 March	1	Cronulla-Sutherland Sharks	McDonald Jones Stadium	14 – 8	T. Glasby, E. Lee	K. Ponga (3/3)	21,813
23 March	2	Penrith Panthers	McDonald Jones Stadium	14 – 16	M. Barnett, E. Lee	K. Ponga (3/5)	19,451
29 March	3	Canberra Raiders	GIO Stadium	10 – 17	S. Kenny-Dowall, J. Ramien	K. Ponga (1/2)	10,585
7 April	4	St. George Illawarra Dragons	McDonald Jones Stadium	12-13	E. Lee, H. Hunt.	K. Ponga (1/2)	19,105
13 April	5	Manly-Warringah Sea Eagles	McDonald Jones Stadium	18-26	E. Lee, A. Guerra, M. Barnett	K. Ponga (3/3)	21,779
21 April	6	Gold Coast Titans	Cbus Super Stadium	38-14	H. Hunt, M. Barnett, K. Ponga	M. Barnett (1/3)	11,654
28 April	7	Parramatta Eels	McDonald Jones Stadium	28-14	K. Ponga, L. Fitzgibbon, J. Gavet, M. Pearce	K. Ponga (4/4)	19,604
5 May	8	New Zealand Warriors	Mt Smart Stadium	36-18	M. Pearce, S. Kenny-Dowall, S. Mata'utia, H. Hunt, K. Ponga	K. Ponga (4/4)	14,975
11 May	9	Canterbury-Bankstown Bulldogs	Suncorp Stadium	22-10	H. Hunt, M. Pearce, L. Fitzgibbon, K. Ponga	K. Ponga (3/4)	25,292
19 May	10	St. George Illawarra Dragons	Glen Willow Oval	45-12	T. Glasby, K. Ponga 2, K. Mann, S. Kenny-Dowall, M. Pearce, C. Watson	K. Ponga (6/7)	9,267
24 May	11	Sydney Roosters	McDonald Jones Stadium	38-12	H. Hunt, K. Ponga, M. Pearce, C. Watson, E. Lee	K. Ponga (7/7) M. Barnett (2/2)	25,929
	12	Bye					
7 June	13	South Sydney Rabbitohs	ANZ Stadium	20-12	H. Hunt, M. Barnett, C. Watson	M. Lino (4/5)	8,253
15 June	14	Melbourne Storm	AAMI Park	34-4	H. Hunt	-	16,313
29 June	15	Brisbane Broncos	McDonald Jones Stadium	26-12	E. Lee, L. Fitzgibbon, S. Kenny-Dowall, M. Lino	M. Lino (5/5)	24,397
6 July	16	New Zealand Warriors	McDonald Jones Stadium				
12 July	17	Canterbury-Bankstown Bulldogs	McDonald Jones Stadium				
20 July	18	Sydney Roosters	Sydney Cricket Ground				
26 July	19	Wests Tigers	McDonald Jones Stadium				
3 August	20	Manly-Warringah Sea Eagles	Lottoland				
10 August	21	Parramatta Eels	Bankwest Stadium				
17 August	22	North Queensland Cowboys	McDonald Jones Stadium				
24 August	23	Wests Tigers	Campbelltown Stadium				
31 August	24	Gold Coast Titans	McDonald Jones Stadium				
8 September	25	Penrith Panthers	Panthers Stadium				
Legend: Win Loss Draw

== Statistics ==
Name	Appearances	Tries	Goals	Field goals	Points	Captain	Age
Mitchell Barnett	21	7	3	0	34	0	25
Bradman Best	3	1	0	0	4	0	18
Jamie Buhrer	9	0	0	0	0	1	30
Phoenix Crossland	1	0	0	0	0	0	19
Herman Ese'ese	18	2	0	0	8	0	25
Lachlan Fitzgibbon	21	5	0	0	20	0	25
James Gavet	18	1	0	0	4	0	30
Tim Glasby	21	2	0	0	8	0	30
Aidan Guerra	12	2	0	0	8	0	31
Hymel Hunt	24	9	0	0	36	0	26
Shaun Kenny-Dowall	23	8	0	0	32	1	31
Josh King	13	0	0	0	0	0	24
David Klemmer	21	0	0	0	0	0	26
Edrick Lee	14	6	0	0	24	0	27
Danny Levi	17	0	0	0	0	0	24
Mason Lino	12	2	33	0	74	0	25
Kurt Mann	19	1	0	0	4	0	26
Sione Mata'utia	22	5	0	0	20	0	23
Tautau Moga	6	2	0	0	8	0	26
Mitchell Pearce	23	8	0	1	33	23	30
Kalyn Ponga	20	11	48	0	140	0	21
Jesse Ramien	17	2	0	0	8	0	22
Daniel Saifiti	21	0	0	0	0	0	23
Jacob Saifiti	7	0	0	0	0	0	23
Pasami Saulo	3	0	0	0	0	0	21
Starford To'a	1	1	0	0	4	0	19
Connor Watson	21	4	0	0	16	0	23
Totals	24	79	84	1	485	-	Average: 25

27 players used.

== Representative honours ==
The following players appeared in a representative match in 2019.

Australia

- David Klemmer

Australian Men's Nines

- Kalyn Ponga

Australian Schoolboys

- Mitchell Black
- Cooper Jenkins

Indigenous All Stars

- Jesse Ramien

Junior Kangaroos

- Kalyn Ponga

Junior Kiwis

- Christian Ma'anaima
- Simi Sasagi (squad member)
- Daniel Ticehurst
- Starford To'a

Māori All Stars

- Danny Levi
- Kalyn Ponga

New South Wales

- David Klemmer
- Mitchell Pearce
- Daniel Saifiti

New South Wales under-16s

- Max Bradbury
- Lachlan Crouch
- Oryn Keeley
- Fletcher Myers
- Noah Nailagoliva
- Jonah Pezet
- Noah Reed

New South Wales under-18s

- Bradman Best
- Mitchell Black

New South Wales under-20s

- Mat Croker
- Phoenix Crossland (20th man)
- Tex Hoy
- Luke Huth

New Zealand Nines

- Starford To'a (squad member)

Queensland

- Tim Glasby
- Kalyn Ponga

Queensland under-20s

- Brandon Russell (squad member)

Samoa

- Herman Ese'ese
- James Gavet
- Hymel Hunt
- Mason Lino

Samoan Nines

- James Gavet (squad member)
- Danny Levi

Tonga

- Kristian Woolf (coach)
