= 2019 NRL season =

112th season of professional rugby league in Australia

2019 National Rugby League
- Duration: March 14 – October 6, 2019
- Teams: 16
- Premiers: Sydney Roosters (15th title)
- Minor premiers: Melbourne Storm (4th title)
- Matches played: 201
- Points scored: 7,905
- Average attendance: 15,804
- Attendance: 3,176,561
- Top points scorer: Latrell Mitchell (273)
- Wooden spoon: Gold Coast Titans (2nd spoon)
- Dally M Medal: James Tedesco
- Top try-scorer: Maika Sivo (22)

The 2019 NRL season was the 112th season of professional rugby league in Australia and the 22nd season run by the National Rugby League. The Sydney Roosters became the first team to win back-to-back Premierships since the Brisbane Broncos in 1997–98, and the first to achieve the feat since the unified NRL competition started in 1998.

== Teams ==
The lineup of teams remained unchanged for the 13th consecutive year.

Colours	Club	Season	Home ground(s)	Head coach	Captain(s)
	Brisbane Broncos	32nd season	Suncorp Stadium	Anthony Seibold	Darius Boyd
	Canberra Raiders	38th season	GIO Stadium Canberra	Ricky Stuart	Jarrod Croker & Josh Hodgson
	Canterbury-Bankstown Bulldogs	85th season	ANZ Stadium & Belmore Sports Ground	Dean Pay	Josh Jackson
	Cronulla-Sutherland Sharks	53rd season	PointsBet Stadium	John Morris	Paul Gallen & Wade Graham
	Gold Coast Titans	13th season	Cbus Super Stadium	~~Garth Brennan~~ → Luke Burt (interim)	Ryan James
	Manly Warringah Sea Eagles	70th season	Lottoland	Des Hasler	Daly Cherry-Evans
	Melbourne Storm	22nd season	AAMI Park	Craig Bellamy	Cameron Smith
	Newcastle Knights	32nd season	McDonald Jones Stadium	~~Nathan Brown~~ → Kristian Woolf (interim)	Mitchell Pearce
	New Zealand Warriors	25th season	Mt. Smart Stadium	Stephen Kearney	Roger Tuivasa-Sheck
	North Queensland Cowboys	25th season	1300SMILES Stadium	Paul Green	Michael Morgan
	Parramatta Eels	73rd season	Bankwest Stadium	Brad Arthur	Tim Mannah & Clint Gutherson
	Penrith Panthers	53rd season	Panthers Stadium	Ivan Cleary	James Maloney → James Tamou
	South Sydney Rabbitohs	110th season	ANZ Stadium	Wayne Bennett	~~Greg Inglis~~ → Sam Burgess
	St. George Illawarra Dragons	21st season	Netstrata Jubilee Stadium & WIN Stadium	Paul McGregor	Gareth Widdop
	Sydney Roosters	112th season	Sydney Cricket Ground	Trent Robinson	Jake Friend & Boyd Cordner
	Wests Tigers	20th season	Leichhardt Oval, Campbelltown Stadium & Bankwest Stadium	Michael Maguire	Moses Mbye

== Pre-season ==
The 2019 pre-season featured the All Stars match held on February 15 at AAMI Park. The 2019 World Club Challenge match saw the NRL premiers Sydney Roosters defeat the Super League champions Wigan Warriors.

== Regular season ==
For the first time, the NRL announced that the entirety of a round of games would be hosted at a single venue, adopting the Super League's Magic Weekend concept. Magic Round took place during Round 9 at Suncorp Stadium.

State of Origin was played in Perth for the first time, with Game 2 of the 2019 series played at Optus Stadium.

Team	1	2	3	4	5	6	7	8	9	10	11	12	13	14	15	16	17	18	19	20	21	22	23	24	25	F1	F2	F3	GF
Brisbane Broncos	**MEL**; **10**	NQL; 19	SGI; 1	**SYD**; **32**	WTI; 6	**CAN**; **4**	CRO; 23	**SOU**; **32**	MAN; 16	SYD; 5	**NZL**; **6**	X	GCT; 8	**PAR**; **28**	**NEW**; **14**	**CRO**; **2**	NZL; 0*	CBY; 22	**GCT**; **22**	MEL; 36	**NQL**; **4**	PEN; 12	SOU; 2	PAR; 1*	**CBY**; **16**	**PAR**; **58**			
Canberra Raiders	**GCT**; **21**	MEL; 12	NEW; 7	**NQL**; **18**	PAR; 19	BRI; 4	**MAN**; **4**	**PEN**; **18**	**SYD**; **6**	SOU; 4	NQL; 6	**CBY**; **2**	**WTI**; **28**	CRO; 2	**PAR**; **6**	X	**SGI**; **22**	WTI; 8	**PEN**; **12**	**NZL**; **34**	SYD; 4	**MEL**; **4**	MAN; 4	**CRO**; **1***	NZL; 4	**MEL**; **2**	X	SOU; 6	**SYD**; **6**
Canterbury-Bankstown Bulldogs	**NZL**; **34**	PAR; 20	**WTI**; **14**	**MEL**; **2**	**SGI**; **36**	SOU; 8	NQL; 12	**MAN**; **8**	NEW; 12	**GCT**; **6**	MEL; 22	CAN; 2	SGI; 24	**SYD**; **26**	CRO; 2	X	**NEW**; **6**	**BRI**; **22**	SYD; 8	PEN; 8	WTI; 2	SOU; 8	**PAR**; **6**	**NQL**; **7**	BRI; 16				
Cronulla-Sutherland Sharks	**NEW**; **6**	GCT; 14	**NQL**; **26**	**PAR**; **12**	SYD; 14	PEN; 4	**BRI**; **23**	MEL; 2	**GCT**; **8**	MAN; 10	**SGI**; **13**	X	PAR; 20	**CAN**; **2**	**CBY**; **2**	BRI; 2	**MEL**; **24**	**NZL**; **1**	NQL; 2	SOU; 15	**PEN**; **6**	SGI; 6	NZL; 26	CAN; 1*	**WTI**; **17**	**MAN**; **12**			
Gold Coast Titans	CAN; 21	**CRO**; **14**	**SOU**; **8**	**NZL**; **16**	PEN; 6	NEW; 24	**WTI**; **16**	**NQL**; **14**	CRO; 8	CBY; 6	**MAN**; **18**	NQL; 2	**BRI**; **8**	NZL; 4	MAN; 18	X	**PEN**; **22**	MEL; 20	BRI; 22	**SYD**; **52**	**SGI**; **12**	PAR; 24	**MEL**; **16**	**NEW**; **34**	SGI; 8				
Manly Warringah Sea Eagles	**WTI**; **14**	SYD; 8	**NZL**; **34**	SOU; 1*	**NEW**; **8**	**SGI**; **2**	CAN; 4	CBY; 8	**BRI**; **16**	**CRO**; **10**	GCT; 18	**PEN**; **3**	**NQL**; **2**	SGI; 20	**GCT**; **18**	X	**SOU**; **1**	PAR; 12	**MEL**; **1***	NEW; 24	**NZL**; **8**	WTI; 20	**CAN**; **4**	MEL; 30	**PAR**; **16**	CRO; 12	**SOU**; **8**		
Melbourne Storm	BRI; 10	**CAN**; **12**	**PEN**; **30**	CBY; 2	**NQL**; **6**	SYD; 1*	NZL; 1	**CRO**; **2**	PAR; 54	WTI; 2	**CBY**; **22**	X	**NZL**; **22**	NEW; 30	**SYD**; **2**	**SGI**; **2**	CRO; 24	**GCT**; **20**	MAN; 1*	**BRI**; **36**	**SOU**; **10**	CAN; 4	GCT; 16	**MAN**; **30**	NQL; 8	CAN; 2	PAR; 32	**SYD**; **8**	
Newcastle Knights	CRO; 6	PEN; 2	**CAN**; **7**	SGI; 1*	MAN; 8	**GCT**; **24**	PAR; 14	**NZL**; **18**	**CBY**; **12**	**SGI**; **33**	SYD; 26	X	**SOU**; **8**	**MEL**; **30**	BRI; 14	NZL; 4	CBY; 6	**SYD**; **38**	WTI; 2	**MAN**; **24**	**PAR**; **6**	NQL; 36	**WTI**; **42**	GCT; 34	**PEN**; **44**				
New Zealand Warriors	CBY; 34	**WTI**; **28**	MAN; 34	GCT; 16	**SOU**; **4**	NQL; 7	**MEL**; **1**	NEW; 18	**SGI**; **8**	**PEN**; **20**	BRI; 6	X	MEL; 22	**GCT**; **4**	PEN; 1*	**NEW**; **4**	**BRI**; **0***	CRO; 1	**PAR**; **2**	CAN; 34	MAN; 8	**SYD**; **36**	**CRO**; **26**	SOU; 21	**CAN**; **4**				
North Queensland Cowboys	SGI; 12	**BRI**; **19**	CRO; 26	CAN; 18	MEL; 6	**NZL**; **7**	**CBY**; **12**	GCT; 14	SOU; 16	PAR; 7	**CAN**; **6**	**GCT**; **2**	MAN; 2	WTI; 1*	**SGI**; **8**	X	**SYD**; **3**	SOU; 12	**CRO**; **2**	**WTI**; **24**	BRI; 4	**NEW**; **36**	PEN; 14	CBY; 7	**MEL**; **8**				
Parramatta Eels	**PEN**; **8**	**CBY**; **20**	SYD; 14	CRO; 12	**CAN**; **19**	WTI; 45	**NEW**; **14**	SGI; 14	**MEL**; **54**	**NQL**; **7**	PEN; 6	SOU; 12	**CRO**; **20**	BRI; 28	CAN; 6	X	WTI; 12	**MAN**; **12**	NZL; 2	**SGI**; **8**	NEW; 6	**GCT**; **24**	CBY; 6	**BRI**; **1***	MAN; 16	BRI; 58	**MEL**; **32**		
Penrith Panthers	PAR; 8	**NEW**; **2**	MEL; 30	WTI; 1*	**GCT**; **6**	**CRO**; **4**	SOU; 4	CAN; 18	**WTI**; **26**	NZL; 20	**PAR**; **6**	MAN; 3	SYD; 9	**SOU**; **1**	**NZL**; **1***	X	GCT; 22	SGI; 22	CAN; 12	**CBY**; **8**	CRO; 6	**BRI**; **12**	**NQL**; **14**	**SYD**; **16**	NEW; 44				
South Sydney Rabbitohs	**SYD**; **10**	**SGI**; **16**	GCT; 8	**MAN**; **1***	NZL; 4	**CBY**; **8**	**PEN**; **4**	BRI; 32	**NQL**; **16**	**CAN**; **4**	WTI; 16	**PAR**; **12**	NEW; 8	PEN; 1	**WTI**; **5**	X	MAN; 1	**NQL**; **12**	SGI; 4	**CRO**; **15**	MEL; 10	**CBY**; **8**	**BRI**; **2**	**NZL**; **21**	SYD; 6	**SYD**; **24**	MAN; 8	**CAN**; **6**	
St. George Illawarra Dragons	**NQL**; **12**	SOU; 16	**BRI**; **1**	**NEW**; **1***	CBY; 36	MAN; 2	**SYD**; **10**	**PAR**; **14**	NZL; 8	NEW; 33	CRO; 13	X	**CBY**; **24**	**MAN**; **20**	NQL; 8	MEL; 2	CAN; 22	**PEN**; **22**	**SOU**; **4**	PAR; 8	GCT; 12	**CRO**; **6**	SYD; 22	WTI; 28	**GCT**; **8**				
Sydney Roosters	SOU; 10	**MAN**; **8**	**PAR**; **14**	BRI; 32	**CRO**; **14**	**MEL**; **1***	SGI; 10	WTI; 30	CAN; 6	**BRI**; **5**	**NEW**; **26**	X	**PEN**; **9**	CBY; 26	MEL; 2	**WTI**; **8**	NQL; 3	NEW; 38	**CBY**; **8**	GCT; 52	**CAN**; **4**	NZL; 36	**SGI**; **22**	PEN; 16	**SOU**; **6**	SOU; 24	X	MEL; 8	CAN; 6
Wests Tigers	MAN; 14	NZL; 28	CBY; 14	**PEN**; **1***	**BRI**; **6**	**PAR**; **45**	GCT; 16	**SYD**; **30**	PEN; 26	**MEL**; **2**	**SOU**; **16**	X	CAN; 28	**NQL**; **1***	SOU; 5	SYD; 8	**PAR**; **12**	**CAN**; **8**	**NEW**; **2**	NQL; 24	**CBY**; **2**	**MAN**; **20**	NEW; 42	**SGI**; **28**	CRO; 17				
Team	1	2	3	4	5	6	7	8	9	10	11	12	13	14	15	16	17	18	19	20	21	22	23	24	25	F1	F2	F3	GF

Bold – Opposition's Home game
X – Bye
* – Golden point game
Opponent for round listed above margin

== Ladder ==
2019 NRL season
Pos	Team	Pld	W	D	L	B	PF	PA	PD	Pts
1	Melbourne Storm	24	20	0	4	1	631	300	+331	42
2	Sydney Roosters	24	17	0	7	1	627	363	+264	36
3	South Sydney Rabbitohs	24	16	0	8	1	521	417	+104	34
4	Canberra Raiders	24	15	0	9	1	524	374	+150	32
5	Parramatta Eels	24	14	0	10	1	533	473	+60	30
6	Manly-Warringah Sea Eagles	24	14	0	10	1	496	446	+50	30
7	Cronulla-Sutherland Sharks	24	12	0	12	1	514	464	+50	26
8	Brisbane Broncos	24	11	1	12	1	432	489	−57	25
9	Wests Tigers	24	11	0	13	1	475	486	−11	24
10	Penrith Panthers	24	11	0	13	1	413	474	−61	24
11	Newcastle Knights	24	10	0	14	1	485	522	−37	22
12	Canterbury-Bankstown Bulldogs	24	10	0	14	1	326	477	−151	22
13	New Zealand Warriors	24	9	1	14	1	433	574	−141	21
14	North Queensland Cowboys	24	9	0	15	1	378	500	−122	20
15	St. George Illawarra Dragons	24	8	0	16	1	427	575	−148	18
16	Gold Coast Titans	24	4	0	20	1	370	651	−281	10

=== Ladder progression ===
- Numbers highlighted in green indicate that the team finished the round inside the top 8.
- Numbers highlighted in blue indicates the team finished first on the ladder in that round.
- Numbers highlighted in red indicates the team finished last place on the ladder in that round.
- Underlined numbers indicate that the team had a bye during that round.

	Team	1	2	3	4	5	6	7	8	9	10	11	12	13	14	15	16	17	18	19	20	21	22	23	24	25
1	Melbourne	2	4	6	8	10	10	12	12	14	16	18	20	22	24	26	28	30	32	32	34	36	36	38	40	42
2	Sydney	0	2	4	6	8	10	12	14	16	16	16	18	18	20	20	22	22	24	26	28	30	32	34	36	36
3	South Sydney	2	4	6	6	8	10	12	14	16	18	20	20	20	20	20	22	24	26	28	28	28	28	30	32	34
4	Canberra	2	2	4	6	8	10	10	12	12	12	12	14	16	18	18	20	22	24	26	28	28	30	30	32	32
5	Parramatta	2	4	4	6	6	8	8	10	10	10	10	12	12	14	16	18	20	20	22	24	26	28	28	28	30
6	Manly-Warringah	0	0	2	4	6	6	8	10	10	12	12	12	14	16	18	20	20	22	24	26	26	28	30	30	30
7	Cronulla-Sutherland	0	2	4	4	4	6	6	8	10	10	12	14	16	16	16	16	16	16	18	20	20	22	24	24	26
8	Brisbane	0	2	2	2	2	2	4	4	6	8	10	12	12	12	12	14	15	17	19	19	21	23	23	25	25
9	Wests	2	4	4	4	6	6	8	8	10	10	10	12	12	14	16	16	16	16	18	20	20	20	22	24	24
10	Penrith	0	2	2	4	4	4	4	4	4	4	6	8	10	12	14	16	18	20	20	20	22	22	22	22	24
11	Newcastle	2	2	2	2	2	2	4	6	8	10	12	14	16	16	18	18	18	18	18	18	18	20	20	22	22
12	Canterbury-Bankstown	0	0	2	2	2	2	4	4	4	6	6	6	6	6	8	10	12	12	12	14	16	18	20	20	22
13	New Zealand	2	2	2	4	4	4	4	4	6	8	8	10	10	12	12	14	15	17	17	17	19	19	19	19	21
14	North Queensland	2	2	2	2	2	4	4	6	6	8	10	12	12	12	12	14	16	16	16	16	16	16	18	20	20
15	St. George Illawarra	0	0	2	4	6	8	8	8	8	8	8	10	12	12	14	14	14	14	14	14	16	16	16	16	18
16	Gold Coast	0	0	0	0	2	4	4	4	4	4	6	6	8	8	8	10	10	10	10	10	10	10	10	10	10

== Finals series ==
Parramatta Eels 58 – 0 Elimination Final win over Brisbane Broncos broke the record for the biggest winning margin in Finals history, beating the previous mark of 48 points when Newtown defeated St. George 55 – 7 in the 1944 Semi-finals.

Home	Score	Away	Match Information
Home	Score	Away	Date and Time (Local)	Venue	Referees	Crowd
QUALIFYING & ELIMINATION Finals
Sydney Roosters	30 – 6	South Sydney Rabbitohs	13 September 2019, 7:50 pm	Sydney Cricket Ground	Gerard Sutton; Adam Gee	30,370
Melbourne Storm	10 – 12	Canberra Raiders	14 September 2019, 5:45 pm	AAMI Park	Ashley Klein; Chris Sutton	20,136
Manly Warringah Sea Eagles	28 – 16	Cronulla-Sutherland Sharks	14 September 2019, 7:50 pm	Lottoland	Matt Cecchin; Henry Perenara	15,495
Parramatta Eels	58 – 0	Brisbane Broncos	15 September 2019, 4:05 pm	Bankwest Stadium	Ben Cummins; Grant Atkins	29,372
SEMI Finals
South Sydney Rabbitohs	34 – 26	Manly Warringah Sea Eagles	20 September 2019, 7:50 pm	ANZ Stadium	Gerard Sutton; Adam Gee	32,127
Melbourne Storm	32 – 0	Parramatta Eels	21 September 2019, 7:50 pm	AAMI Park	Ben Cummins; Grant Atkins	21,015
PRELIMINARY Finals
Canberra Raiders	16 – 10	South Sydney Rabbitohs	27 September 2019, 7:55 pm	GIO Stadium	Ben Cummins; Grant Atkins	26,567
Sydney Roosters	14 – 6	Melbourne Storm	28 September 2019, 7:55 pm	Sydney Cricket Ground	Gerard Sutton; Adam Gee	32,814

=== Chart ===
Qualifying and elimination finals
14 Sept, AAMI Park
1	Melbourne	10
4	Canberra	12
15 Sept, Bankwest Stadium
5	Parramatta	58
8	Brisbane	0
14 Sept, Lottoland
6	Manly-Warringah	28
7	Cronulla-Sutherland	16
13 Sept, Sydney Cricket Ground
2	Sydney	30
3	South Sydney	6

Semi-finals
21 Sept, AAMI Park
Melbourne	32
Parramatta	0
20 Sept, ANZ Stadium
South Sydney	34
Manly-Warringah	26

Preliminary finals
27 Sept, GIO Stadium
Canberra	16
South Sydney	10
28 Sept, Sydney Cricket Ground
Sydney	14
Melbourne	6

Grand final
6 Oct, ANZ Stadium
Sydney	14
Canberra	8

== Grand Final ==
Sunday, 6 October
7:40pm (AEDT)

Sydney Roosters	14 – 8	Canberra Raiders
Tries: Sam Verrills (7') 1 James Tedesco (73') 1 Goals: Latrell Mitchell 3/5 (8', 21' pen, 74'); Sin Bin: Cooper Cronk (50') 1	1st: 8 - 6; 2nd: 6 - 2	Tries: Jack Wighton (31') 1 Goals: Jarrod Croker 2/2 (32', 50' pen)

ANZ Stadium
Attendance: 82,922
Clive Churchill Medal: Jack Wighton
Referee: Ben Cummins, Gerard Sutton

== Player statistics and records ==
- In Round 5, Cameron Smith surpassed Hazem El Masri's career tally of 2,418 points to become the highest point scorer in NRL history. In Round 17 he played his 400th NRL career game, becoming the first player to ever do so.

The following statistics are as of the conclusion of Round 25.

Top 5 point scorers

Points	Player	Tries	Goals	Field Goals
251	Latrell Mitchell	18	89	1
212	Jarrod Croker	12	82	0
206	Cameron Smith	2	99	0
185	Adam Reynolds	2	87	3
181	Mitchell Moses	2	86	1

Top 5 try scorers

Tries	Player
20	Maika Sivo
18	Latrell Mitchell
17	Ken Maumalo
16	Reuben Garrick
15	James Tedesco
15	Daniel Tupou
15	Cody Walker

Top 5 goal scorers

Goals	Player
99	Cameron Smith
89	Latrell Mitchell
87	Adam Reynolds
86	Mitchell Moses
82	Jarrod Croker

Top 5 tacklers

Tackles	Player
1,146	Cameron McInnes
1,138	Reed Mahoney
1,030	James Fisher-Harris
1,026	Damien Cook
992	Jake Trbojevic

== 2019 Transfers ==
=== Players ===
Player	2018 Club	2019 Club
Jordan Kahu	Brisbane Broncos	North Queensland Cowboys
Josh McGuire	Brisbane Broncos	North Queensland Cowboys
Korbin Sims	Brisbane Broncos	St. George Illawarra Dragons
Sam Tagataese	Brisbane Broncos	Souths Logan Magpies (Intrust Super Cup)
Sam Thaiday	Brisbane Broncos	Retirement
Blake Austin	Canberra Raiders	Super League: Warrington Wolves
Shannon Boyd	Canberra Raiders	Gold Coast Titans
Junior Paulo	Canberra Raiders	Parramatta Eels
Greg Eastwood	Canterbury-Bankstown Bulldogs	Retirement
Matt Frawley	Canterbury-Bankstown Bulldogs	Super League: Huddersfield Giants
David Klemmer	Canterbury-Bankstown Bulldogs	Newcastle Knights
Moses Mbye	Canterbury-Bankstown Bulldogs	Wests Tigers
Brett Morris	Canterbury-Bankstown Bulldogs	Sydney Roosters
Josh Morris	Canterbury-Bankstown Bulldogs	Cronulla-Sutherland Sharks
Aaron Woods	Canterbury-Bankstown Bulldogs	Cronulla-Sutherland Sharks
Trent Hodkinson	Cronulla-Sutherland Sharks	Manly Warringah Sea Eagles
Valentine Holmes	Cronulla-Sutherland Sharks	New York Jets (NFL)
Edrick Lee	Cronulla-Sutherland Sharks	Newcastle Knights
Ricky Leutele	Cronulla-Sutherland Sharks	Toronto Wolfpack
Luke Lewis	Cronulla-Sutherland Sharks	Retirement
Joseph Paulo	Cronulla-Sutherland Sharks	Super League: St. Helens
James Segeyaro	Cronulla-Sutherland Sharks	Brisbane Broncos
Ava Seumanufagai	Cronulla-Sutherland Sharks	Super League: Leeds Rhinos
Kane Elgey	Gold Coast Titans	Manly Warringah Sea Eagles
Brendan Elliot	Gold Coast Titans	Manly Warringah Sea Eagles
Konrad Hurrell	Gold Coast Titans	Super League: Leeds Rhinos
Ryan Simpkins	Gold Coast Titans	Retirement
Lewis Brown	Manly Warringah Sea Eagles	Retirement
Jackson Hastings	Manly Warringah Sea Eagles	Super League: Salford Red Devils
Brian Kelly	Manly Warringah Sea Eagles	Gold Coast Titans
Shaun Lane	Manly Warringah Sea Eagles	Parramatta Eels
Akuila Uate	Manly Warringah Sea Eagles	Super League: Huddersfield Giants
Frank Winterstein	Manly Warringah Sea Eagles	Penrith Panthers
Jonathan Wright	Manly Warringah Sea Eagles	Retirement
Matthew Wright	Manly Warringah Sea Eagles	Central Queensland Capras (Intrust Super Cup)
Cheyse Blair	Melbourne Storm	Super League: Castleford Tigers
Tim Glasby	Melbourne Storm	Newcastle Knights
Ryan Hoffman	Melbourne Storm	Retirement
Ryley Jacks	Melbourne Storm	Gold Coast Titans
Sam Kasiano	Melbourne Storm	Super League: Catalans Dragons
Patrick Kaufusi	Melbourne Storm	St. George Illawarra Dragons
Billy Slater	Melbourne Storm	Retirement
Young Tonumaipea	Melbourne Storm	Hiatus
Slade Griffin	Newcastle Knights	Retirement
Chris Heighington	Newcastle Knights	Retirement
Brock Lamb	Newcastle Knights	Sydney Roosters
Jacob Lillyman	Newcastle Knights	Retirement
Nathan Ross	Newcastle Knights	Retirement
Ken Sio	Newcastle Knights	Super League: Salford Red Devils
Luke Yates	Newcastle Knights	Super League: London Broncos
James Gavet	New Zealand Warriors	Newcastle Knights
Anthony Gelling	New Zealand Warriors	Widnes Vikings
Shaun Johnson	New Zealand Warriors	Cronulla-Sutherland Sharks
Simon Mannering	New Zealand Warriors	Retirement
Albert Vete	New Zealand Warriors	Melbourne Storm
Lachlan Coote	North Queensland Cowboys	Super League: St. Helens
Shaun Fensom	North Queensland Cowboys	Brisbane Broncos
Kane Linnett	North Queensland Cowboys	Super League: Hull Kingston Rovers
Ethan Lowe	North Queensland Cowboys	South Sydney Rabbitohs
Johnathan Thurston	North Queensland Cowboys	Retirement
Antonio Winterstein	North Queensland Cowboys	Retirement
Kirisome Auva'a	Parramatta Eels	Retirement
Kenny Edwards	Parramatta Eels	Super League: Catalans Dragons
Bevan French	Parramatta Eels	Super League: Wigan Warriors
Jarryd Hayne	Parramatta Eels	Retirement
Cameron King	Parramatta Eels	Featherstone Rovers
Suaia Matagi	Parramatta Eels	Super League: Huddersfield Giants
Corey Norman	Parramatta Eels	St. George Illawarra Dragons
Kaysa Pritchard	Parramatta Eels	Retirement
Beau Scott	Parramatta Eels	Retirement
Siosaia Vave	Parramatta Eels	Retirement
Tony Williams	Parramatta Eels	Retirement
Corey Harawira-Naera	Penrith Panthers	Canterbury-Bankstown Bulldogs
Sam McKendry	Penrith Panthers	Retirement
Trent Merrin	Penrith Panthers	Super League: Leeds Rhinos
Tyrone Peachey	Penrith Panthers	Gold Coast Titans
Peter Wallace	Penrith Panthers	Retirement
Jason Clark	South Sydney Rabbitohs	Super League: Warrington Wolves
Angus Crichton	South Sydney Rabbitohs	Sydney Roosters
Robbie Farah	South Sydney Rabbitohs	Wests Tigers
Hymel Hunt	South Sydney Rabbitohs	Newcastle Knights
Robert Jennings	South Sydney Rabbitohs	Wests Tigers
Zane Musgrove	South Sydney Rabbitohs	N/A
Leeson Ah Mau	St. George Illawarra Dragons	New Zealand Warriors
Jack de Belin	St. George Illawarra Dragons	Suspension
Nene Macdonald	St. George Illawarra Dragons	North Queensland Cowboys
Kurt Mann	St. George Illawarra Dragons	Newcastle Knights
Jason Nightingale	St. George Illawarra Dragons	Retirement
Kurt Baptiste	Sydney Roosters	North Queensland Cowboys
Blake Ferguson	Sydney Roosters	Parramatta Eels
Ryan Matterson	Sydney Roosters	Wests Tigers
Dylan Napa	Sydney Roosters	Canterbury-Bankstown Bulldogs
Frank-Paul Nu'uausala	Sydney Roosters	Retirement
Reece Robinson	Sydney Roosters	Retirement
Pita Godinet	Wests Tigers	Villeneuve Leopards (Elite One Championship)
Tim Grant	Wests Tigers	Penrith Panthers
Tuimoala Lolohea	Wests Tigers	Super League: Leeds Rhinos
Matt McIlwrick	Wests Tigers	Retirement
Kevin Naiqama	Wests Tigers	Super League: St. Helens
Robbie Rochow	Wests Tigers	Retirement
Sauaso Sue	Wests Tigers	Canterbury-Bankstown Bulldogs
Malakai Watene-Zelezniak	Wests Tigers	Penrith Panthers
Ryan Hall	Super League: Leeds Rhinos	Sydney Roosters
Tyrone Roberts	Super League: Warrington Wolves	Gold Coast Titans
John Bateman	Super League: Wigan Warriors	Canberra Raiders
Ryan Sutton	Super League: Wigan Warriors	Canberra Raiders
Drew Hutchison	Leigh Centurions	Sydney Roosters
Lachlan Maranta	Queensland Reds (Super Rugby)	St. George Illawarra Dragons
Lachlan Burr	N/A	New Zealand Warriors

=== Coaches ===
Coach	2018 Club	2019 Club
Wayne Bennett	Brisbane Broncos	South Sydney Rabbitohs
Shane Flanagan	Cronulla-Sutherland Sharks	Indefinite ban
Anthony Seibold	South Sydney Rabbitohs	Brisbane Broncos
Ivan Cleary	Wests Tigers	Penrith Panthers
Des Hasler	N/A	Manly Warringah Sea Eagles
Michael Maguire	N/A	Wests Tigers
