= Starford To'a =

Tonga international rugby league footballer

Personal information
- Born: 23 June 2000 (age 26) Auckland, New Zealand
- Height: 183 cm (6 ft 0 in)
- Weight: 97 kg (15 st 4 lb)

Playing information
- Position: Centre, Wing, Fullback
Club
Years	Team	Pld	T	G	FG	P
2019–21	Newcastle Knights	20	11	0	0	44
2022–26	Wests Tigers	71	21	0	0	84
2027-	Manly Sea Eagles	0	0	0	0	0
	Total	91	32	0	0	128
Representative
Years	Team	Pld	T	G	FG	P
2023	Tonga	1	1	0	0	4
- Source: As of 18 July 2026

Starford To'a (born 23 June 2000) is a Tonga international rugby league footballer who plays as a centre for the Wests Tigers in the National Rugby League.

He previously played for the Newcastle Knights as a winger in the NRL.

== Background ==
To'a was born in Auckland, New Zealand and is of Tongan and European descent. He attended St Paul's College, Auckland.

== Playing career ==
=== Early years ===
In 2018, he moved to Australia to play for the Newcastle Knights, after being scouted by a recruitment manager for the Knights in 2016 at a New Zealand national tournament in Rotorua. He played for the Knights' Jersey Flegg Cup team. At the end of 2018, he played for the Australian Schoolboys and was named man of the match in their first game.

=== 2019 ===
In 2019, To'a joined the Knights' NRL squad for pre-season training and played in a first-grade trial match. In June, he re-signed with the Knights on a 2-year contract until the end of 2021. In round 25 of the 2019 NRL season, he made his NRL debut for the Knights against the Penrith Panthers and scored a try. On 29 September, he will play for the Junior Kiwis against the Junior Kangaroos.

=== 2020 ===
He made seven appearances for Newcastle in the 2020 NRL season and scored four tries. To'a did not feature in the club's first finals campaign since 2013.

=== 2021 ===
In 2021, To'a made 12 appearances for the Knights, scoring 6 tries.

=== 2022 ===
In January 2022, To'a was granted a release from the final two years of his Newcastle contract to join the Wests Tigers on a two-year contract effective immediately. To'a played a total of 21 matches for the Wests Tigers in the 2022 NRL season and scored 3 tries as the club finished bottom of the table and claimed the wooden spoon for the first time.

=== 2023 ===
In round 12 of the 2023 NRL season, To'a scored two tries for the Wests Tigers in their record breaking victory at 66-18 against the North Queensland. In round 24, To'a scored two tries for the Wests Tigers in their 22-30 loss against the New Zealand Warriors. To'a played a total of 18 games for the Wests Tigers in the 2023 NRL season and scored seven tries as the club finished with the wooden spoon for a second straight year. In the end of season internationals, he was selected and made his debut for the Mate Ma’a Tonga team against England, where he scored a hat trick in a 34-16 win.

=== 2024 & 2025 ===
To'a was limited to only three appearances with the Wests Tigers in the 2024 NRL season as the club finished with the wooden spoon for a third straight year. In round 13 of the 2025 NRL season, he scored two tries in Wests 32-38 loss against North Queensland. On 15 August, Wests announced that To'a had extended his contract for a further two seasons. To'a played a total of 19 games for the Wests Tigers in the 2025 NRL season as the club finished 13th on the table.

=== 2026 ===
On 22 June, the Wests Tigers announced that To'a would depart the club at the end of the season, with Manly announcing that they had signed him on a two-year deal.

== Statistics ==
Year	Team	Games	Tries	Pts
2019	Newcastle Knights	1	1	4
2020	Newcastle Knights	7	4	16
2021	Newcastle Knights	12	6	24
2022	Wests Tigers	21	3	12
2023	Wests Tigers	18	7	28
2024	Wests Tigers	3	0	0
2025	Wests Tigers	19	9	36
2026	Wests Tigers	9	2	8
	Totals	91	32	128
