= Tyrone Amey =

Australian rugby league footballer

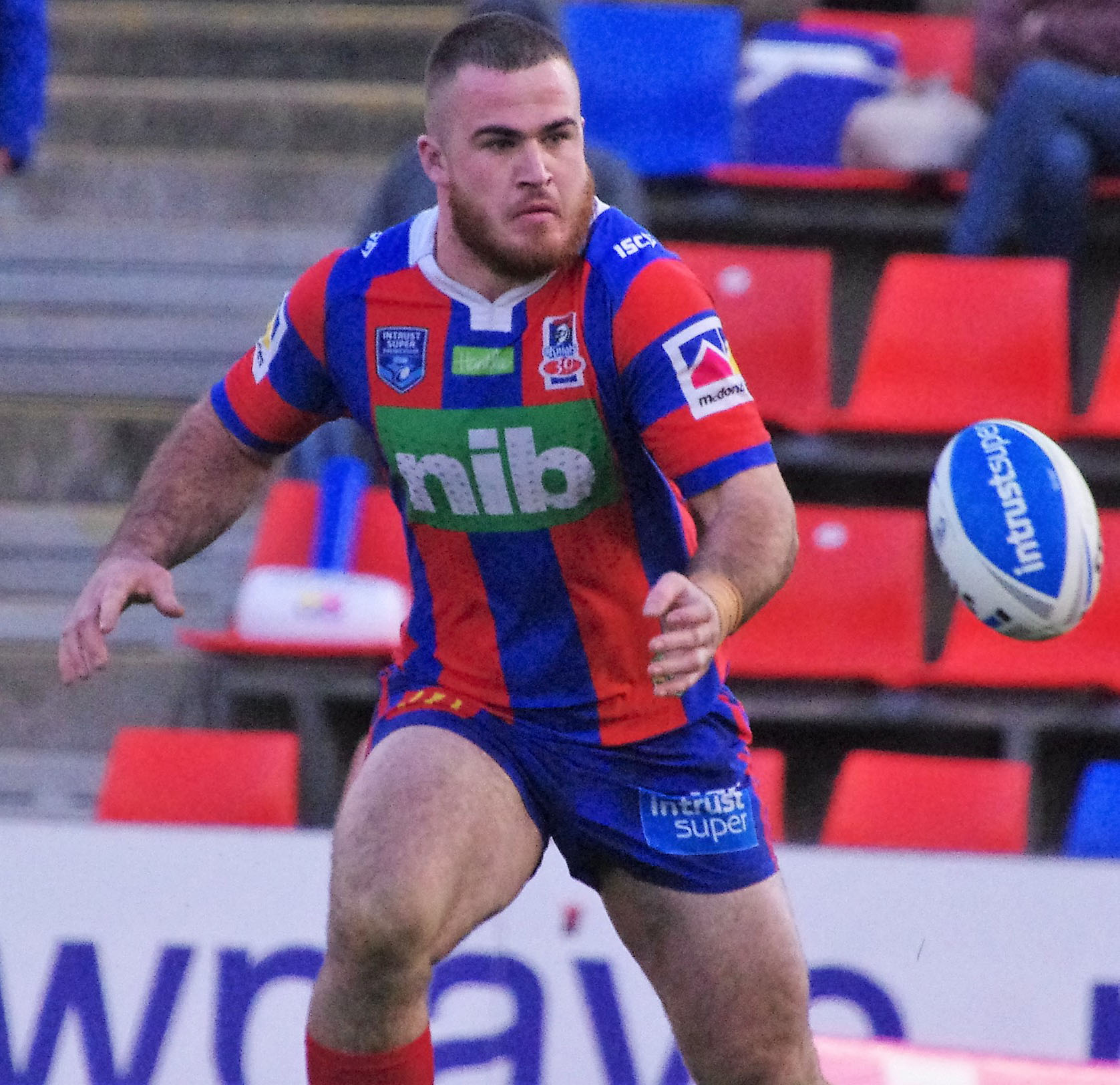
- Amey playing for the Knights' ISP team in 2017.

Personal information
- Born: 20 January 1996 (age 30) Gosford, New South Wales, Australia
- Height: 185 cm (6 ft 1 in)
- Weight: 109 kg (17 st 2 lb)

Playing information
- Position: Prop, Lock
Club
Years	Team	Pld	T	G	FG	P
2017	Newcastle Knights	1	0	0	0	0
- Source: As of 3 September 2017

Tyrone Amey (born 20 January 1996) is an Australian professional rugby league footballer. He plays at prop and lock. He previously played for the Newcastle Knights in the National Rugby League.

== Background ==
Born in Gosford, New South Wales, Amey played his junior rugby league for the South Lakes Roosters, before being signed by the Newcastle Knights.

== Playing career ==
=== Early career ===
In 2015 and 2016, Amey played for the Newcastle Knights' NYC team.

=== 2017 ===
In 2017, Amey graduated to the Knights' Intrust Super Premiership NSW team. In round 26 of the 2017 NRL season, he made his NRL debut for Newcastle against the Cronulla-Sutherland Sharks. After the season ended, he re-signed with the Newcastle outfit on a one-year contract until the end of 2018.

=== 2019 ===
Ahead of the 2019 season, Amey joined the Maitland Pickers in the Newcastle Rugby League, after not being offered a new deal with the Knights.
