= Zac Woolford =

Australian rugby league footballer (b.1996)

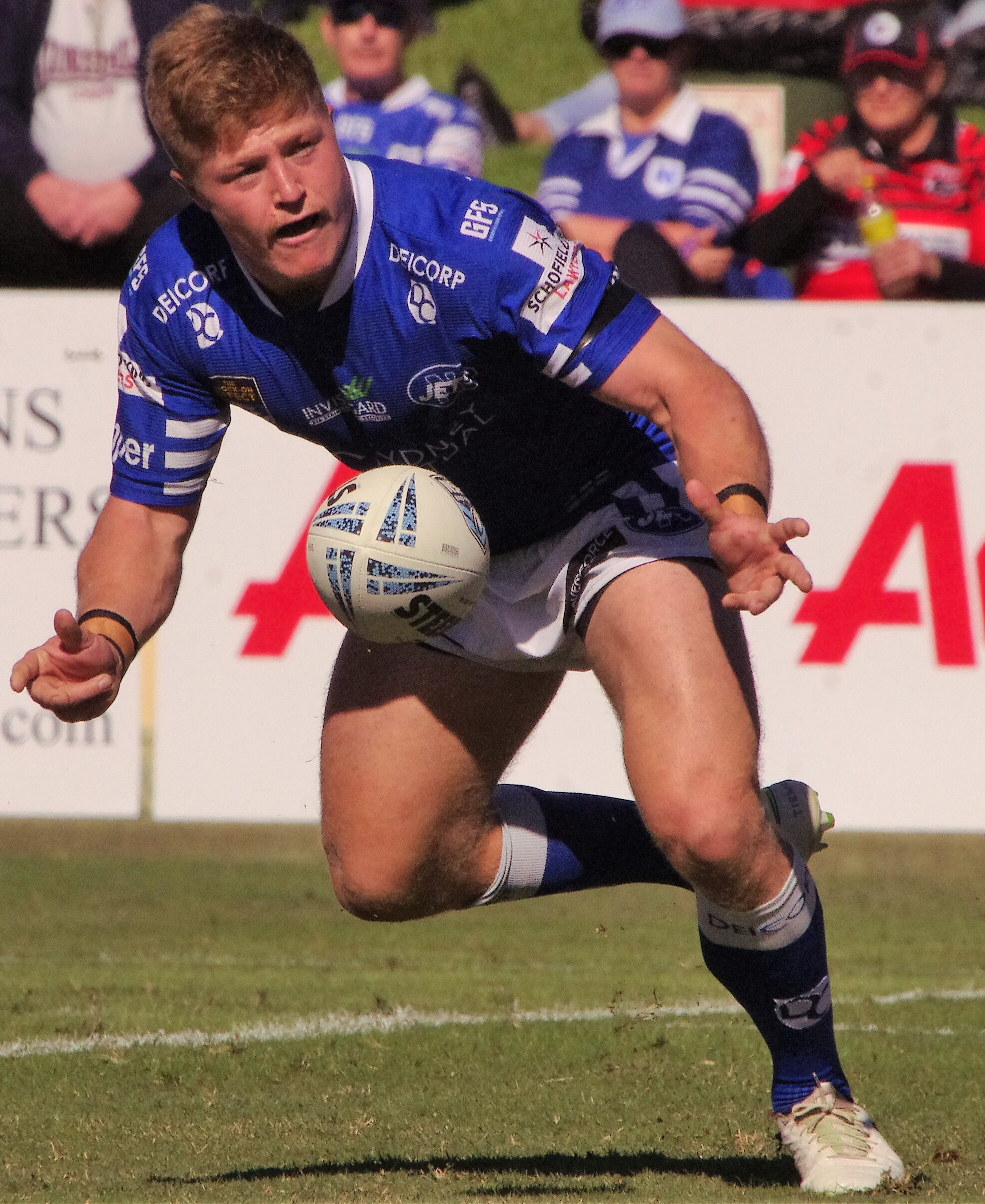

Personal information
- Born: 9 August 1996 (age 30) Canberra, Australian Capital Territory, Australia
- Height: 5 ft 10 in (1.79 m)
- Weight: 14 st 2 lb (90 kg)

Playing information
- Position: Hooker
Club
Years	Team	Pld	T	G	FG	P
2022–24	Canberra Raiders	39	0	0	0	0
2025–	Huddersfield Giants	49	3	0	0	12
	Total	88	3	0	0	12
- Source: As of 2 October 2025
- Father: Simon Woolford

Zac Woolford (born 9 August 1996) is an Australian professional rugby league footballer who plays as a hooker for the Huddersfield Giants in the Super League.

He previously played for the Canberra Raiders in the NRL.

== Background ==
Woolford is the son of former Canberra Raiders and St George Illawarra hooker Simon Woolford. He is nicknamed 'The Germ'

== Playing career ==
Woolford made his first grade debut in round 10 of the 2022 NRL season in his side's 30−10 victory over the Cronulla-Sutherland Sharks at Suncorp Stadium. Woolford played a total of 17 games for Canberra in the 2022 NRL season as the club finished 8th on the table and qualified for the finals. Woolford played in both finals matches as Canberra were eliminated in the second week by Parramatta.

=== 2023 ===
Woolford played a total of 21 matches for Canberra in the 2023 NRL season as the club finished 8th on the table and qualified for the finals. Notable games include Woolford playing in the clubs elimination finals loss against Newcastle.

=== 2024 ===
On 12 September it was announced that Woolford had departed the Canberra club and signed a one-year deal with Super League side Huddersfield.

=== 2025 ===
In round 1 of the 2025 Super League season, Woolford made his club debut for Huddersfield in their 20-12 loss against Warrington. Woolford played 22 games for Huddersfield in the 2025 Super League season as the club finished 10th on the table.

== Statistics ==
Year	Team	Played	Tries	Pts
2022	Canberra Raiders	17	0	0
2023	Canberra Raiders	21	0	0
2024	Canberra Raiders	1	0	0
2025	Huddersfield Giants	23	0	0
2026	Huddersfield Giants	0	0	0
	Totals	62	0	0

* denotes season still competing
