= Hymel Hunt =

Samoa international rugby league footballer

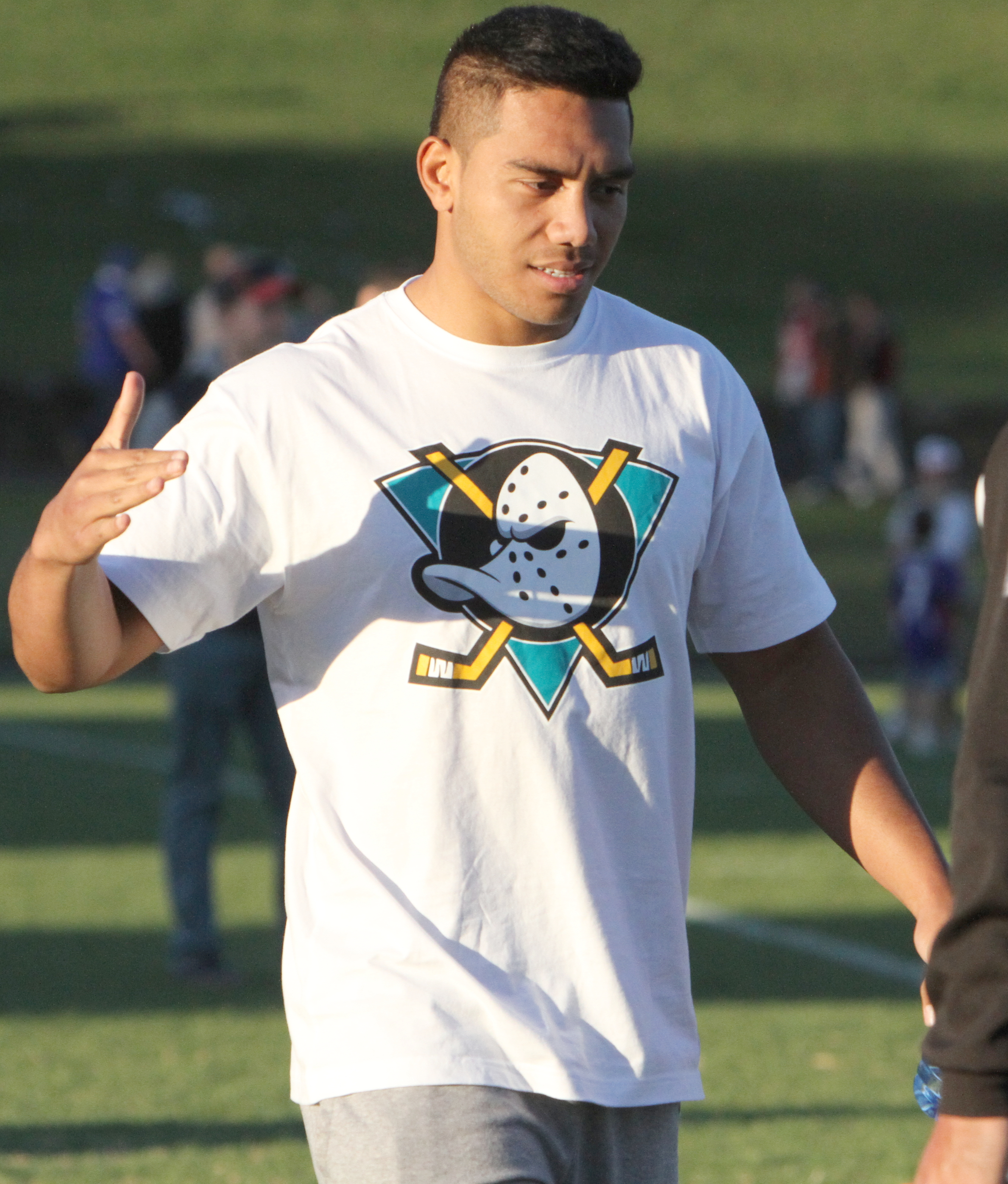

Personal information
- Born: 14 November 1993 (age 33) Auckland, New Zealand
- Height: 191 cm (6 ft 3 in)
- Weight: 99 kg (15 st 8 lb)

Playing information
- Position: Wing, Centre
Club
Years	Team	Pld	T	G	FG	P
2013	Gold Coast Titans	1	0	0	0	0
2015	Melbourne Storm	3	1	0	0	4
2016–18	South Sydney	43	11	0	0	44
2019–23	Newcastle Knights	66	22	0	0	88
	Total	113	34	0	0	136
Representative
Years	Team	Pld	T	G	FG	P
2019	Samoa	1	0	0	0	0
- Source: As of 16 September 2023

Hymel Hunt (born 14 November 1993) is a former Samoa international rugby league footballer who played as a winger or centre.

He previously played for the Gold Coast Titans, Melbourne Storm, South Sydney Rabbitohs and Newcastle Knights in the National Rugby League.

== Background ==
Hunt was born in Auckland, New Zealand, and is of Samoan descent. He moved to Queensland, Australia at a young age and grew up playing rugby union.

He played his junior rugby league for the Redcliffe Dolphins, before being signed by the Gold Coast Titans.

Hunt is the cousin of Queensland Reds player and former Brisbane Broncos player Karmichael Hunt, and former South Sydney Rabbitohs teammate Kirisome Auva'a.

== Playing career ==
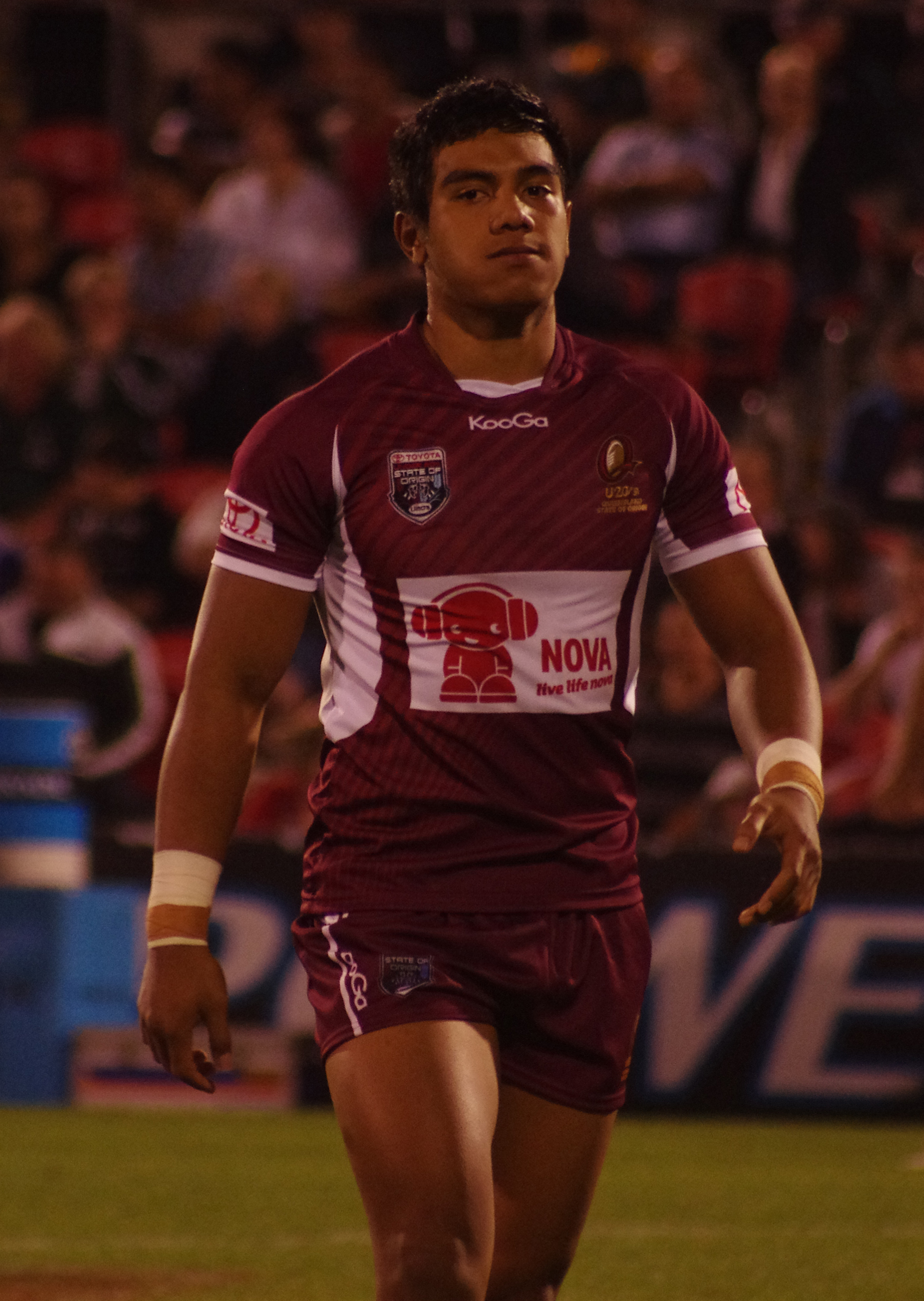
Hunt playing for the Queensland under-20s team in 2012

=== Early career ===
From 2011 to 2013, Hunt played for the Gold Coast Titans' NYC team. On 21 April 2012, he played for the Queensland under-20s team against the New South Wales under-20s team.

=== 2013 ===
In Round 17 of the 2013 NRL season, Hunt made his NRL debut for the Gold Coast Titans against the Penrith Panthers. In April 2013, he again played for the Queensland under-20s team against the New South Wales under-20s team. On 27 August 2013, he was named at centre in the 2013 NYC Team of the Year. On 21 August 2013, he signed a 1-year contract with the Melbourne Storm starting in 2014. On 13 October 2013, Hunt played for the Junior Kangaroos.

=== 2014 ===
In 2014, Hunt received a two-match suspension from the NRL after being found to have placed a bet on NRL matches. He re-signed with the Storm for 2015.

=== 2015 ===
Hunt made his Melbourne debut in Round 14 of the 2015 NRL season against the Parramatta Eels, scoring a try on debut. After the 2015 season, he was released by the Storm. On 20 December, he signed a one-year contract with South Sydney starting in 2016.

=== 2016 ===
In round 1 of the 2016 NRL season, Hunt made his club debut for the South Sydney club against the Sydney Roosters, playing at centre and scoring a try in South Sydney's 42–10 win at the Sydney Football Stadium.

=== 2017 ===
Hunt had a season plagued by injury in 2017 limiting him to only 12 appearances for the year.

=== 2018 ===
Hunt made 21 appearances for Souths and scored seven tries as the club finished 3rd on the table at the end of the regular season and made it all the way to the preliminary final before being defeated by Sydney Roosters 12–4.

On 12 November, Hunt signed a one-year contract with the Newcastle Knights starting in 2019.

=== 2019 ===
Hunt made 24 appearances for Newcastle and scored nine tries in the 2019 NRL season as the club missed out on the finals finishing a disappointing 11th place.

=== 2020 ===
Hunt made 20 appearances for Newcastle and scored eight tries in the 2020 NRL season, as the club made their first finals appearance since 2013 where Newcastle lost 46–20 in week 1 of finals against South Sydney, where Hunt scored two tries in the loss.

Due to his form throughout 2020, Hunt was rewarded with being selected in Queensland 27 man squad, where he played no games in the 2–1 upset series win.

=== 2021 ===
Hunt played 17 games for Newcastle in the 2021 NRL season including the club's elimination finals loss against Parramatta.

=== 2023 ===
After playing 66 games for the Knights, Hunt parted ways with the club at the end of the 2023 season.

=== 2024 ===
On 6 October, Hunt was one of the confirmed players who were honoured at the 2024 NRL retiring players parade.
