= Edrick Lee =

Australian rugby league footballer

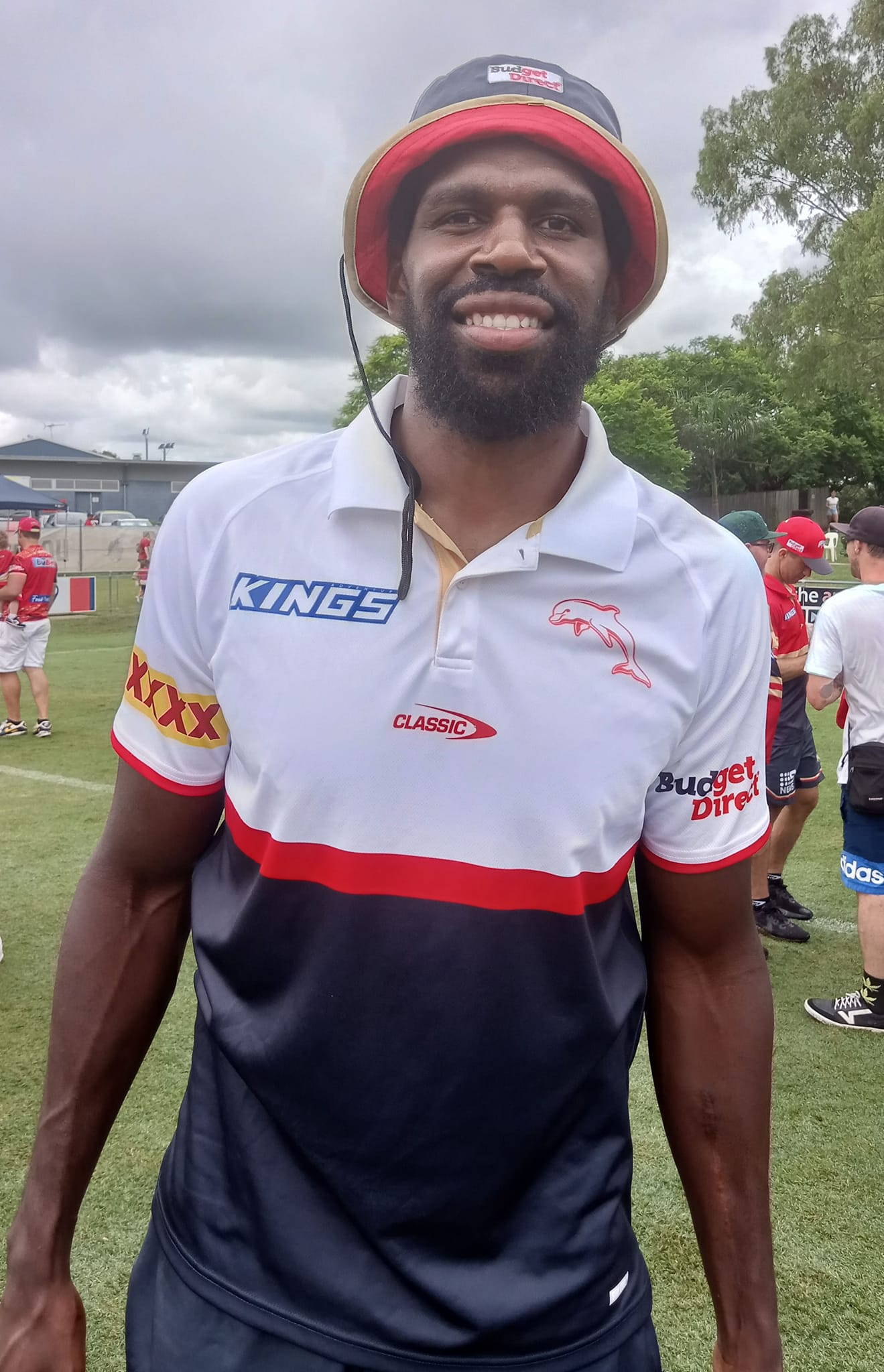

Personal information
- Full name: Edrick Lee
- Born: 18 September 1992 (age 34) Brisbane, Queensland, Australia
- Height: 196 cm (6 ft 5 in)
- Weight: 103 kg (16 st 3 lb)

Playing information
- Position: Wing
Club
Years	Team	Pld	T	G	FG	P
2012–16	Canberra Raiders	67	33	0	0	132
2017–18	Cronulla Sharks	24	14	1	0	58
2019–22	Newcastle Knights	41	26	0	0	104
2023	Dolphins	1	0	0	0	0
	Total	133	73	1	0	294
Representative
Years	Team	Pld	T	G	FG	P
2016	Indigenous All Stars	1	0	0	0	0
2020	Queensland	1	1	0	0	4
- Source: As of 6 December 2023
- Relatives: Brenko Lee (cousin); Patty Mills (cousin); Nathan Jawai (cousin); Danny Morseu (uncle); Eddie Mabo (great uncle )

Edrick Lee (born 18 September 1992) is a former Australian professional rugby league footballer who last played in the National Rugby League (NRL) as a winger for the Dolphins.

Lee previously played for the Newcastle Knights, the Cronulla-Sutherland Sharks and the Canberra Raiders in the NRL. He has also represented the Indigenous All Stars and Queensland in the State of Origin series.

== Background ==
Lee was born and raised in Brisbane, Queensland, Australia. He is of Aboriginal and Torres Strait Islander descent.

Lee is the cousin of rugby league player Brenko Lee and NBA player Patty Mills.

Lee began playing rugby league at age 12 for Easts Mount Gravatt. A keen basketball player in his youth, Lee was part of the Brisbane Bullets development squad in 2006 and 2007.

== Playing career ==
=== Early career (2010-2011) ===
In 2010, Lee was playing rugby league in Brisbane's second division competition for Mt Gravatt, situated in the Brisbane Broncos official catchment area, when he was spotted by Souths Logan Magpies scout Brian Edwards. Edwards recruited Lee to the Magpies under 20s squad. After 8 games, Edwards contacted Canberra Raiders development officer David Hamilton, who signed Lee to play for Canberra's Toyota Cup (Under-20s) team for 2011. Lee's thirty-two appearances with the Raiders NYC side from 2011-2013 started with him playing in the centres, backrow and on the wing.

=== 2012 ===
In 2012, Lee was included in the Canberra first grade trial against the Melbourne Storm in which he scored a try. On 9 March 2012, Lee re-signed with Canberra for a further two years, until the end of the 2014 NRL season. Lee cemented his spot in the centres for the Raiders under 20s in 2012, scoring 11 tries in their first 10 games.

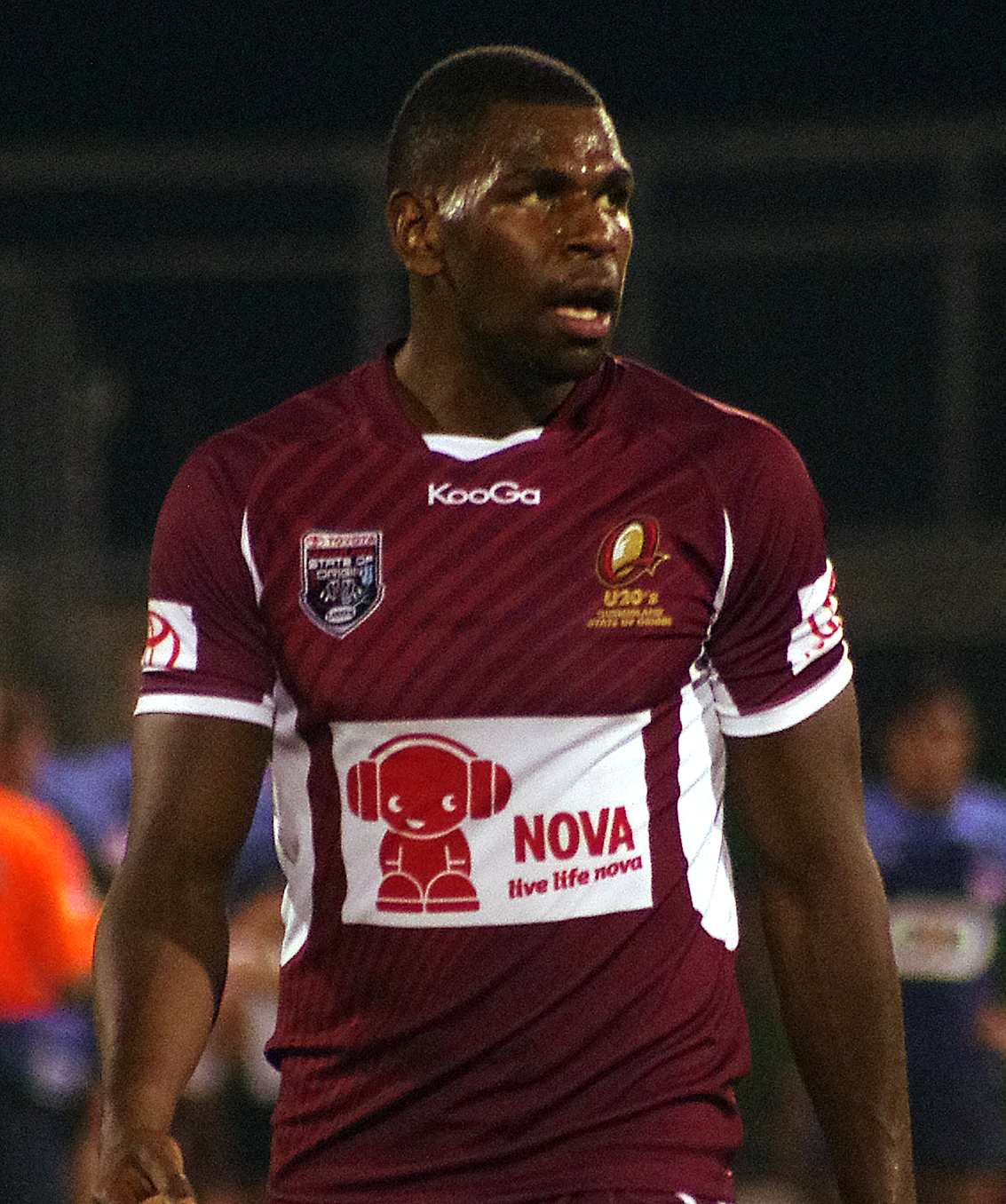
Lee playing for the 2012 Under 20s Queensland team

One of the form players to start the year, Lee was called up to represent Queensland in the inaugural Under 20s State of Origin. Lee scored two tries in the 18–14 loss to New South Wales at Penrith Stadium.

In round 12 of the 2012 NRL season, Lee made his NRL debut on the wing for the Canberra side against the South Sydney Rabbitohs in Canberra's 18–36 loss at ANZ Stadium. In his third first grade game, in round 14, against the Newcastle Knights, Lee scored his first and second NRL career tries in Canberra's 32–16 win at Hunter Stadium. Lee finished his debut year in the NRL with playing in 7 matches and scoring 6 tries. Lee was listed on 23 September in Lifestyle Uncuts' Top Ten Youngsters in the NRL, alongside players such as Nathan Green and Paul Carter.

=== 2013 ===
In round 13, against the Brisbane Broncos, Lee broke his arm with 15 minutes remaining. He remained on the field in Canberra's 30–18 win, resulting in Lee being praised for the toughness he showed. Lee also scored a try in the match. The fracture ended Lee's season. He had played in nine matches and scored seven tries. On 23 October, Lee re-signed with the Canberra Raiders until the end of the 2017 season.

=== 2014 ===
In round 3, against the Gold Coast Titans, Lee was originally ruled out for the rest of the season after tearing ligaments in his foot during Canberra's 12–24 loss. He made a return in round 22 and finished the year with two tries from eight appearances.

=== 2015 ===
In June, Lee was named as 18th man for Queensland leading up to game 3 of the 2015 State of Origin series. He finished the 2015 season having played in 23 matches and scored 12 tries. He was named in the Prime Minister's XIII train-on squad but was ruled out due to injury.

=== 2016 ===
At the start of the year, Lee was selected in the QAS Emerging Maroons squad. On 5 February, Lee was one of eight players from the Maroons emerging camp who was banned from representing Queensland for 12-months after breaking curfew in Brisbane. On 13 February, Lee played on the wing for the Indigenous All Stars against the World All Stars in the 8–12 loss at Suncorp Stadium. In the Canberra sides Preliminary Final match against the Melbourne Storm, Lee made two crucial knock-ons as Canberra lost 12–14 at AAMI Park. Lee finished the 2016 NRL season with him playing in 23 matches and scoring seven tries for the Raiders.

=== 2017 ===
On 23 February 2017, Lee signed a two-year deal the Cronulla-Sutherland Sharks after being released by the Raiders. Lee commented that he was "really excited to be joining the club, I can't wait for this year and I'm grateful for the opportunity." In round 1 of the 2017 NRL season, Lee made his club debut for Cronulla-Sutherland against the Brisbane Broncos, playing on the wing in the 18–26 loss at Shark Park. In round 3, against the St. George Illawarra Dragons, Lee scored his first club try for Cronulla in the 10–16 loss at Shark Park.

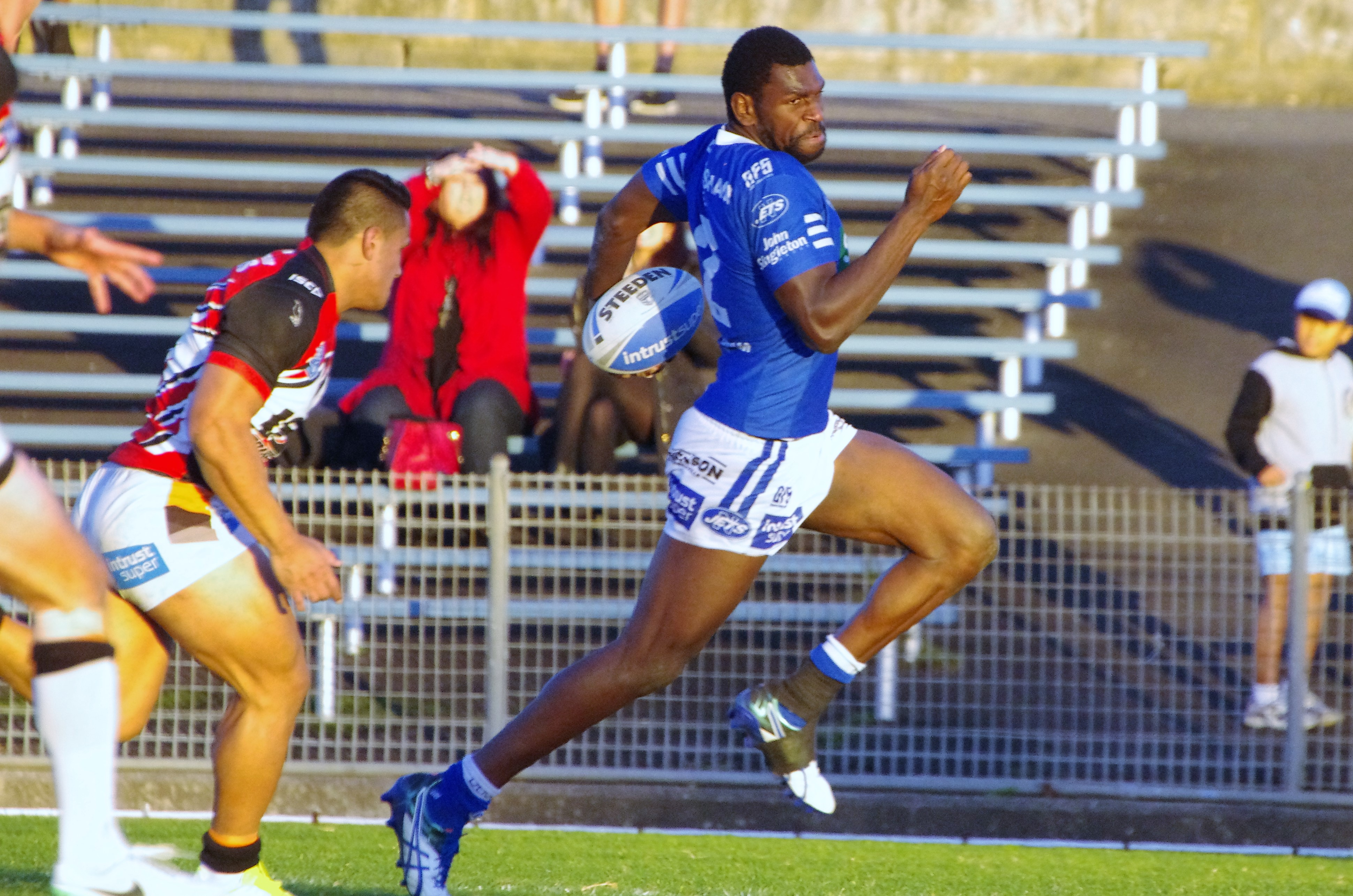
Lee playing for the Newtown Jets in 2017

Lee spent the majority of The 2017 season with Cronulla's feeder club team The Newtown Jets in The Intrust Super Premiership NSW. On 26 June 2017, Lee was held up over the line with less than four minutes to play when playing for Newtown against Wests Tigers in what some media outlets described as the bombed try of the year. If Lee was to have scored the try it would have leveled the game for Newtown and possibly had won them the match.

=== 2018 ===
After spending the majority of the 2017 season in reserve grade playing for Newtown, Lee was recalled to the Cronulla team for their round 4 game against Melbourne. He scored a try on his return in Cronulla's 14–4 victory. In June, he signed a 3-year contract with the Newcastle Knights starting in 2019.

Lee made a total of 19 appearances for Cronulla in 2018 and scored 12 tries. Lee was part of the Cronulla team which made it all the way to the preliminary final but fell short of another grand final appearance losing to Melbourne 22–6.

=== Newcastle Knights (2019-2022) ===
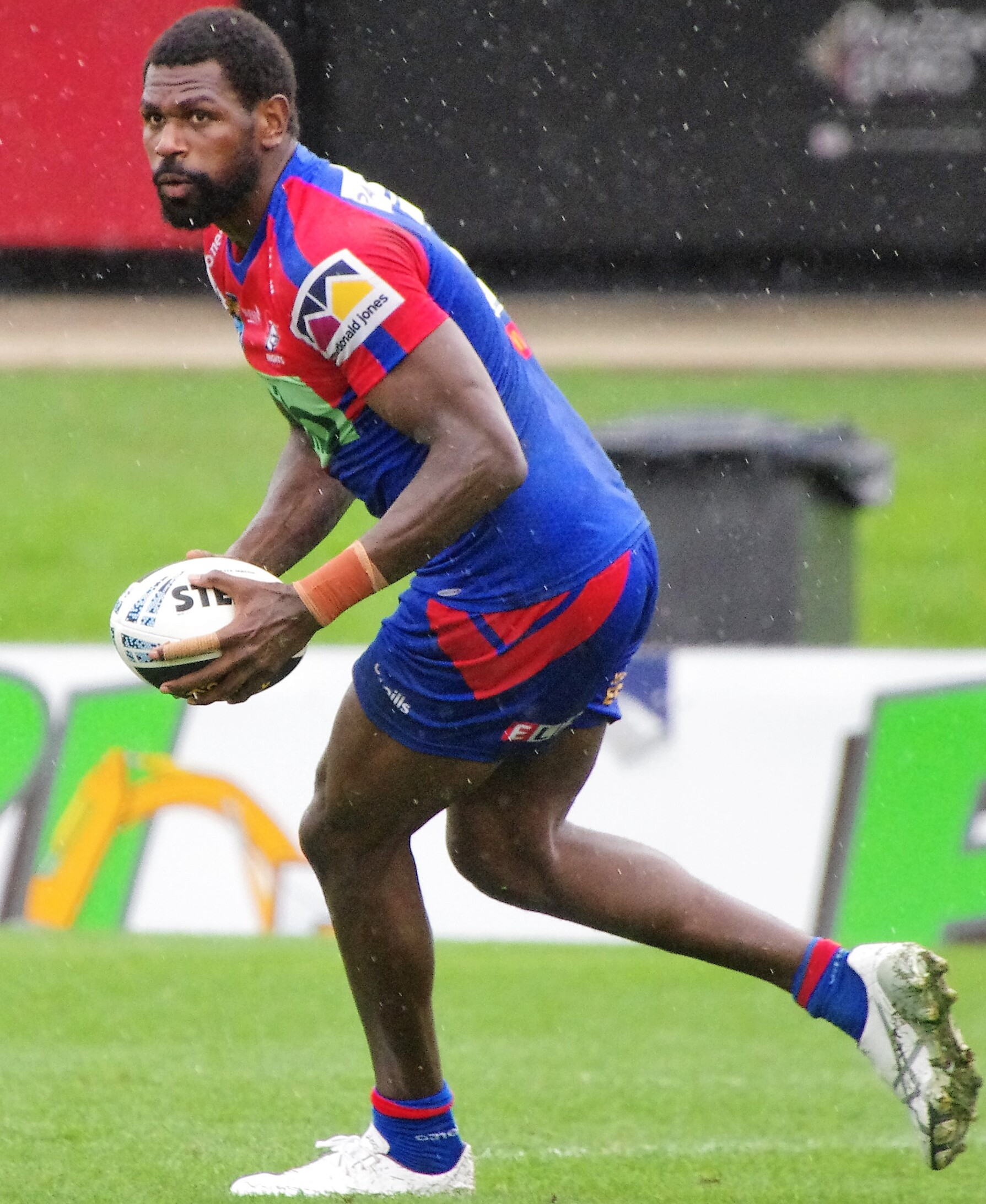
Lee playing for Newcastle in 2022

In the 2019 NRL season, Lee played fourteen games and scored six tries for the Newcastle Knights.

In 2020, he played eleven games and scored six tries for Newcastle.

Lee made his State of Origin debut for Queensland in Game 3 of the 2020 State of Origin series after Xavier Coates was ruled out with an injury he suffered in the pre-game captain's run, debuting alongside his cousin Brenko Lee. Edrick scored a try in the Maroons’ series-winning victory. This would be Lee's last game for over a year after he succumbed to multiple injuries.

Lee was out injured for all of the 2021 NRL season.

Over five-hundred days since his last professional game, Lee returned to the Newcastle side against the St. George Illawarra Dragons in round 6 of the 2022 NRL season. In round 16, he became the first Newcastle player to score five tries in one game, as they defeated the Gold Coast 38-12. In round 23, Lee scored two tries in a 22-28 loss against Canberra. Lee played a total of sixteen games and scored fourteen tries for Newcastle in 2022.

=== Dolphins (2023-24) ===
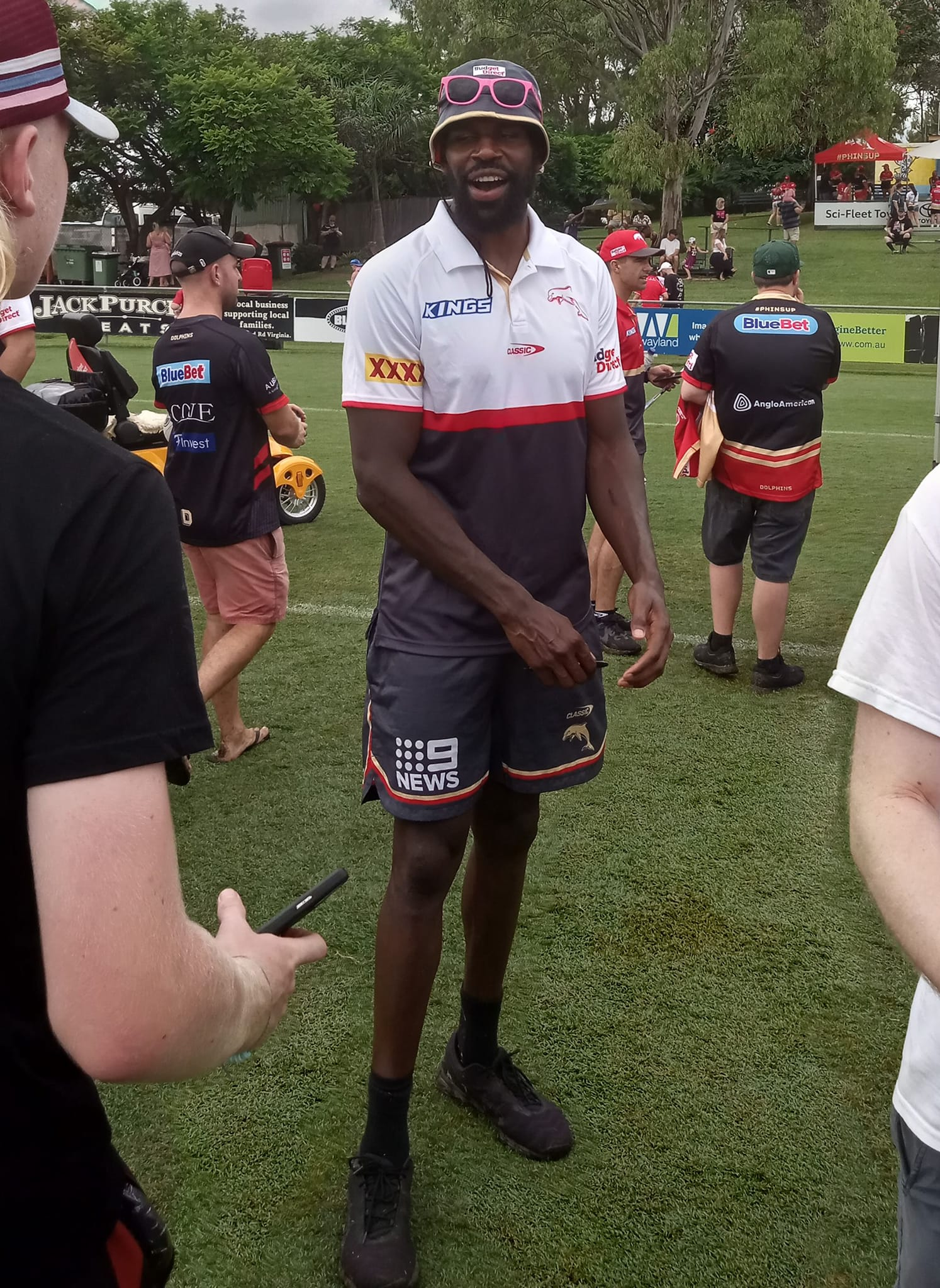
Edrick Lee in 2024

In 2023, Lee commenced a two-year contract with new NRL franchise the Dolphins and made his debut for the club in round 6 against the North Queensland Cowboys at Queensland Country Bank Stadium. Due to injury, he did not play again that year for the Dolphins.

On 6 October, Lee was one of many retiring players who were given a farewell during the NRL Grand Final.
