= Jirah Momoisea =

New Zealand rugby league player

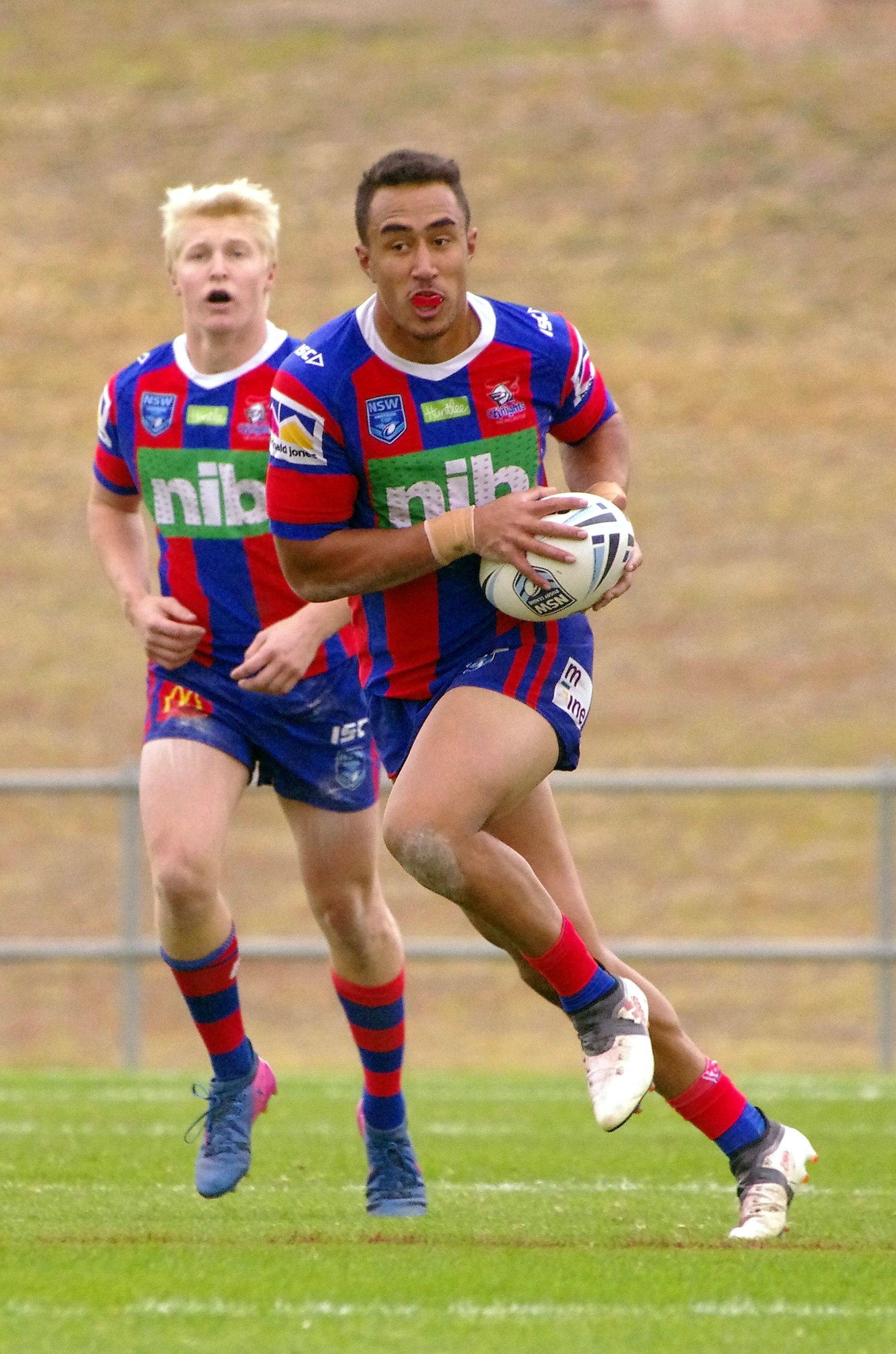

Personal information
- Born: 2 September 1998 (age 27) Auckland, New Zealand
- Height: 193 cm (6 ft 4 in)
- Weight: 109 kg (17 st 2 lb)

Playing information
- Position: Prop, Second-row
Club
Years	Team	Pld	T	G	FG	P
2021–22	Newcastle Knights	8	0	0	0	0
2023–24	Parramatta Eels	3	0	0	0	0
2024–	Canterbury Bulldogs	0	0	0	0	0
	Total	11	0	0	0	0
- Source: As of 16 March 2023

Jirah Momoisea (born 2 September 1998) is a New Zealand professional rugby league footballer who last played as a prop and second-row forward for the Parramatta Eels in the National Rugby League (NRL).

== Background ==
Momoisea was born in Auckland, New Zealand. He played his junior rugby league for St Paul's College, before being signed by the Melbourne Storm.

== Playing career ==
=== Early years ===
In 2017, Momoisea played for the Melbourne Storm NYC team. In 2018, he joined the Newcastle Knights and played for their Jersey Flegg Cup side. In 2019, he graduated to their Intrust Super Premiership team. In July 2019, he was upgraded to an NRL development contract with the Knights until the end of 2020. In January 2020, his contract was upgraded to the NRL top 30 squad and extended until the end of 2022. In December 2020, prior to the Christmas break, Momoisea ruptured his achilles tendon and had surgery to repair the injury, which would sideline him for the start of 2021.

=== 2021 ===
Momoisea made his return from injury with the Knights' Knock-On Effect NSW Cup side in May, before the competition was postponed in June and subsequently cancelled due to a breakout of the COVID-19 virus in New South Wales. However he travelled with the Knights' NRL squad to Queensland as the competition relocated to avoid the virus. In round 23 of the 2021 NRL season, he made his NRL debut for the Knights in their 22–16 win over the Canterbury-Bankstown Bulldogs.

=== 2022 ===
In June, Momoisea signed a two-year contract with the Parramatta Eels starting in 2023.

=== 2023 ===
He made his club debut for Parramatta in round 1 of the 2023 NRL season against Melbourne. Parramatta would lose 16–12 in golden point extra-time. Momoisea was limited to just three matches for Parramatta in the 2023 NRL season as the club finished 10th and missed the finals. Momoisea spent the majority of the year playing for the clubs NSW Cup team.

=== 2024 ===
In March, Momoisea was released by the Parramatta club. On 17 March, Momoisea signed a developmental contract with Parramatta's arch-rivals Canterbury.
