= James Gavet =

Samoa international rugby league footballer

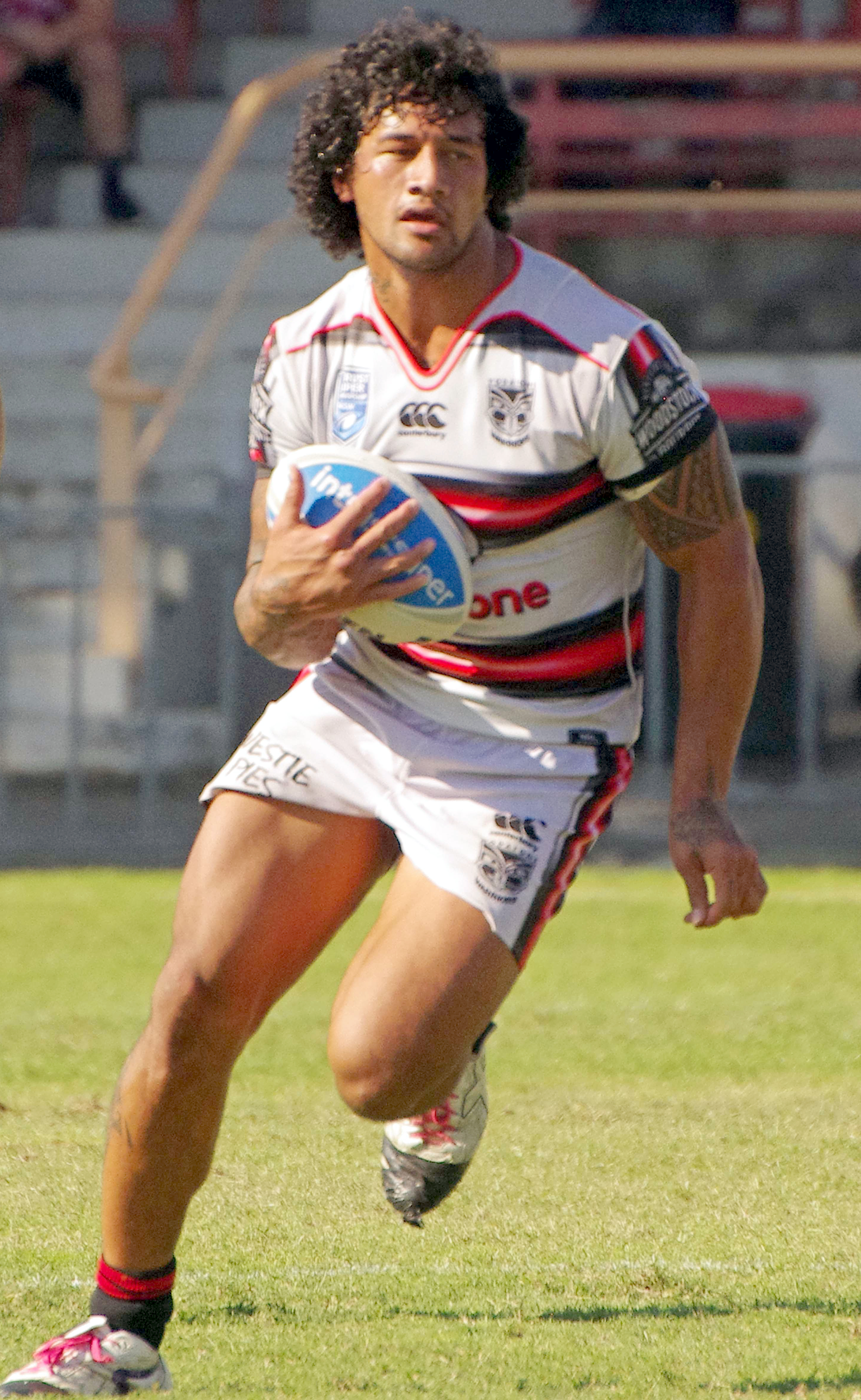

Personal information
- Full name: James Gavet
- Born: 19 October 1989 (age 37) Sydney, New South Wales, Australia
- Height: 6 ft 3 in (1.91 m)
- Weight: 18 st 2 lb (115 kg)

Playing information
- Position: Prop
Club
Years	Team	Pld	T	G	FG	P
2012	Canterbury Bulldogs	1	0	0	0	0
2014	Wests Tigers	13	1	0	0	4
2015	Brisbane Broncos	2	0	0	0	0
2016–18	New Zealand Warriors	42	2	0	0	8
2019	Newcastle Knights	18	1	0	0	4
2020–21	Huddersfield Giants	21	4	0	0	16
2022–24	Richmond Rovers	17	10	0	0	40
	Total	114	18	0	0	72
Representative
Years	Team	Pld	T	G	FG	P
2016–19	Samoa	4	1	0	0	4
2022	Akarana Falcons	4	1	0	0	4
- Source: As of 24 May 2024

James Gavet (born 19 October 1989) is a former Samoa international rugby league footballer who last played as a prop for the Huddersfield Giants in the Super League.

He previously played for the Canterbury-Bankstown Bulldogs, Wests Tigers, Brisbane Broncos, New Zealand Warriors and the Newcastle Knights in the NRL.

== Background ==
Gavet was born in Sydney, Australia. He is of Samoan heritage.

He is the brother-in-law of Oklahoma City Thunder basketball player Steven Adams.

== Playing career ==
=== Early career ===
Gavet moved to New Zealand at a young age and played his junior football for rugby union club Ponsonby and the Richmond Bulldogs before being signed by the New Zealand Warriors. Gavet played for the Warriors NYC team in 2009, scoring 2 tries in 18 matches before moving on to the Warriors' NSW Cup reserve-grade team, the Auckland Vulcans, in 2010. In 2011, Gavet was named Prop of the Year in NSW Cup and signed a 2-year contract with the Canterbury-Bankstown Bulldogs after playing them in the 2011 NSW Cup Grand Final.

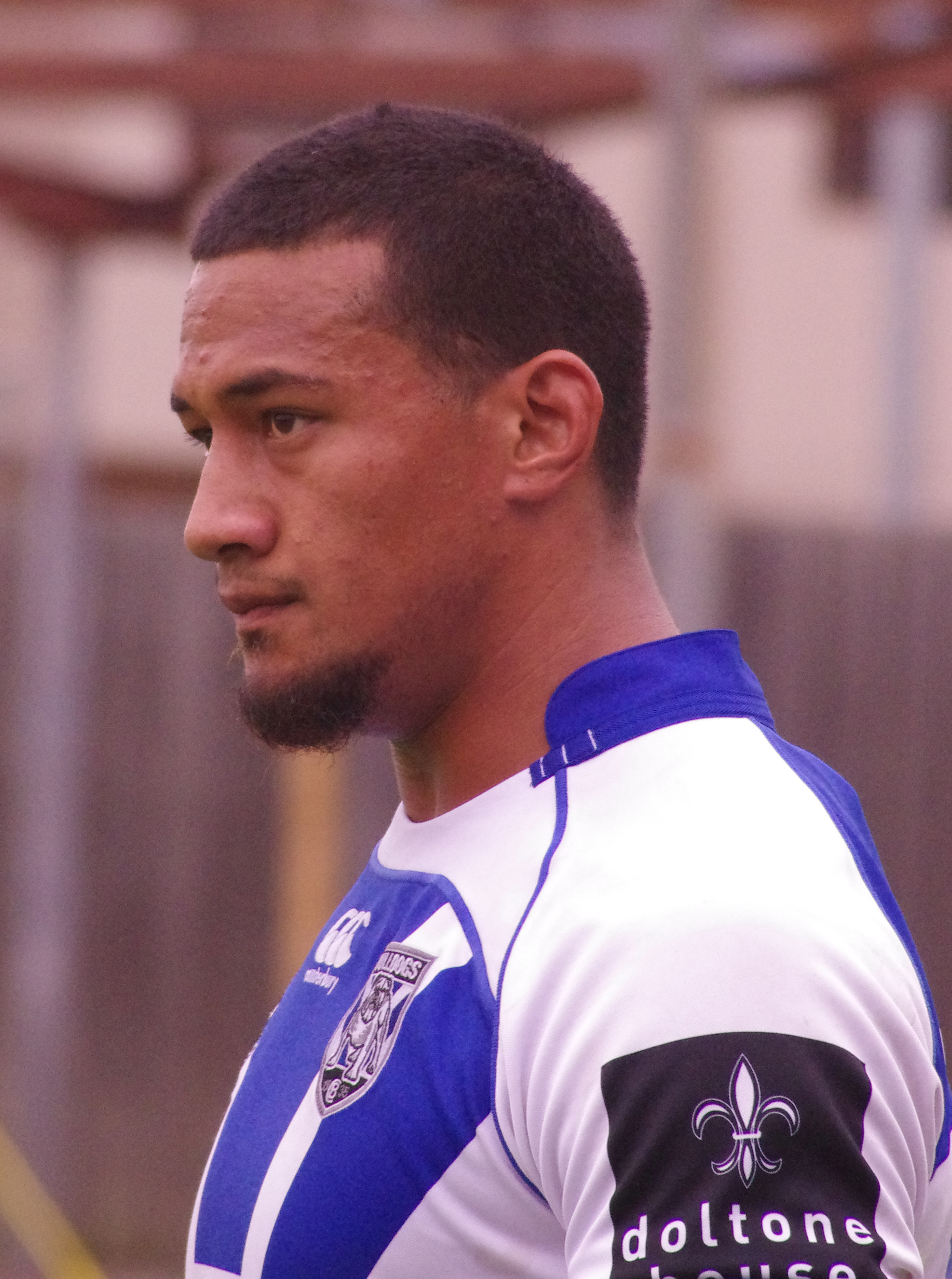
Gavet playing for the Bulldogs

=== Canterbury-Bankstown Bulldogs ===
In round 23 of the 2012 NRL season, Gavet made his NRL debut for the Canterbury-Bankstown Bulldogs against the Brisbane Broncos playing off the interchange bench in the club's 22-14 win at ANZ Stadium. Gavet played one match for Canterbury in the 2012 NRL season. On 12 December 2012, Gavet signed a 1-year contract with the Wests Tigers starting in 2013.

=== Wests Tigers ===
Gavet missed most of the 2013 NRL season with a foot injury and failed to make a first grade appearance.

On 14 February 2014, Gavet was selected in the Tigers inaugural 2014 Auckland Nines squad. In round 1 against the St George Illawarra Dragons, Gavet made his club debut for Wests off the interchange bench in the club's 44-24 loss at ANZ Stadium his first match in 574 days. In round 19 against the Canterbury-Bankstown Bulldogs at ANZ Stadium, Gavet scored his first NRL career try in the Tigers 46-18 win. Gavet finished off the Wests Tigers 2014 NRL season with him playing in 12 matches and scoring a try.

=== Brisbane Broncos ===
On 13 October 2014, Gavet was granted an immediate release from Wests to join the Brisbane Broncos on a two-year contract.

Gavet was named in the Brisbane squad for the 2015 NRL Auckland Nines.

In his NRL debut game for the club, he was put on report late in the match for a shoulder charge and was served a three-game suspension. While serving the suspension, he ruptured his anterior cruciate ligament (ACL) at training, ruling him out for the rest of the season. On 20 October 2015, he was granted release from the final year of his Broncos contract.

=== New Zealand Warriors ===
In January 2016, Gavet returned to the New Zealand Warriors on a trial basis, before signing a 1-year contract starting effective immediately on 22 February.

Gavet was named in the Warriors squad for the 2017 NRL Auckland Nines.

=== Samoa ===
On 8 September 2014, Gavet was named in the Samoa train-on squad for the 2014 Four Nations, but didn’t make the final 24 man squad.

On 8 October 2016, he made his international debut for Samoa in their historical test match against Fiji in Apia.

== Boxing ==
In 2022, Isaac Peach trained Gavet out of Peach Boxing for a celebrity corporate charity boxing fight against Liam Messam at 2022 Fight for life.
