= David Klemmer =

Australia international rugby league footballer

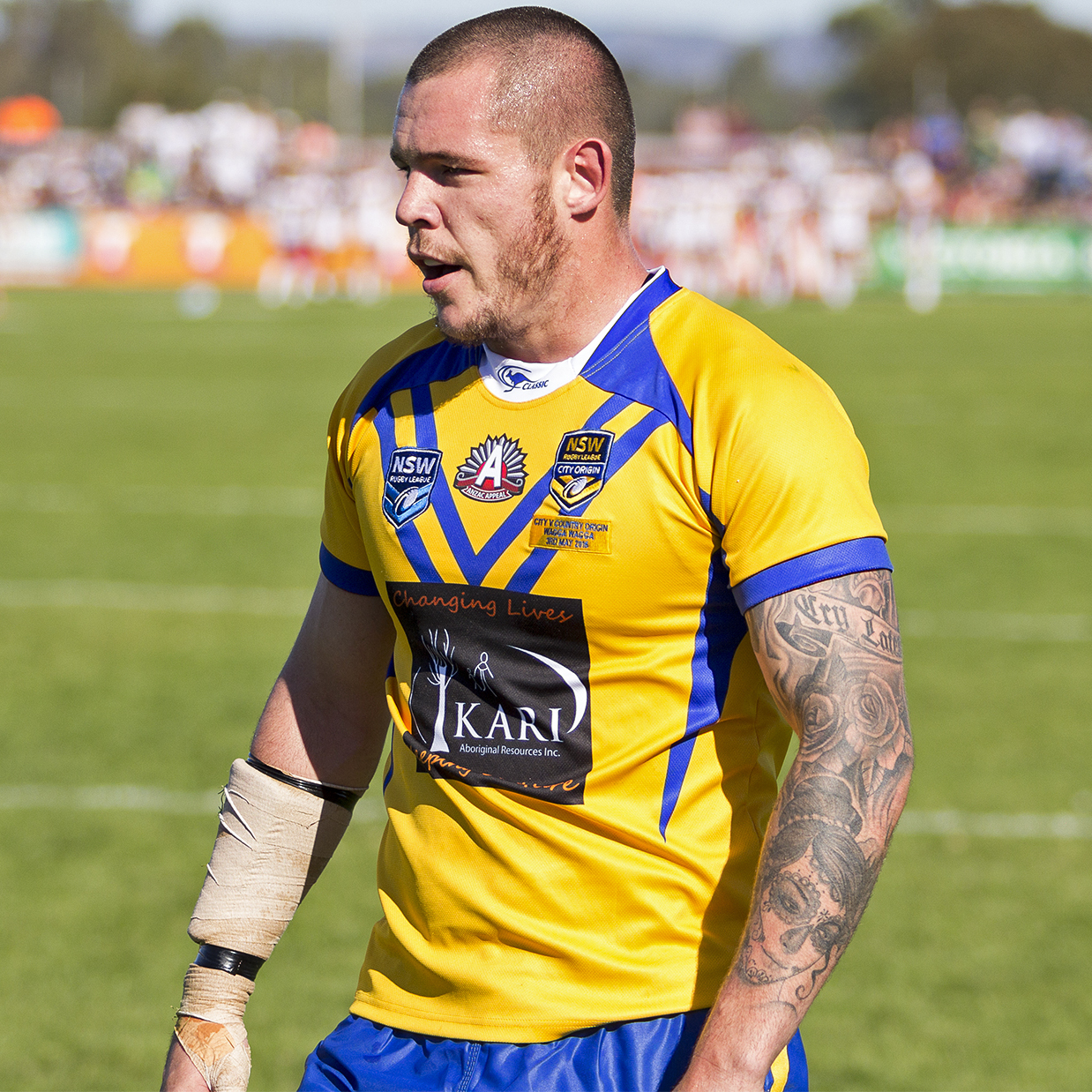

Personal information
- Full name: David Klemmer
- Born: 22 December 1993 (age 32) Sydney, New South Wales, Australia
- Height: 6 ft 6 in (1.98 m)
- Weight: 18 st 4 lb (116 kg)

Playing information
- Position: Prop, Loose forward
Club
Years	Team	Pld	T	G	FG	P
2013–18	Canterbury Bulldogs	113	4	0	0	16
2019–22	Newcastle Knights	81	1	0	0	4
2023–24	Wests Tigers	44	1	0	0	4
2025	St. George Illawarra	22	0	0	0	0
2026–	St Helens	24	2	0	0	8
	Total	284	8	0	0	32
Representative
Years	Team	Pld	T	G	FG	P
2014–15	NSW City	2	0	0	0	0
2014–19	Australia	19	1	0	0	4
2015–19	New South Wales	14	0	0	0	0
2016–18	Prime Minister's XIII	3	0	0	0	0
- Source: As of 4 August 2026

David Klemmer (born 22 December 1993) is an Australian professional rugby league footballer, who plays as a prop or loose forward for St Helens in the Super League, and Australia international level.

He previously played for the Canterbury-Bankstown Bulldogs and the Newcastle Knights in the NRL. Klemmer has played for City Origin and New South Wales in the State of Origin series.

== Background ==
Klemmer was born in Sydney, New South Wales, Australia and is of German descent.

He played his junior rugby league for the All Saints Toongabbie Tigers, before being signed by the Canterbury-Bankstown Bulldogs. He also played Australian rules football and played for the Sydney Swans academy.

== Playing career ==
At 15 years of age, Klemmer signed with the Canterbury-Bankstown Bulldogs. In 2010 and 2011, Klemmer played for the Australian Schoolboys. In 2011, Klemmer also played for the New South Wales under 18s team.

He played for Canterbury-Bankstown's NYC team in 2011 and 2012, scoring 6 tries in 28 games.

In 2012, Klemmer was named on the interchange bench for New South Wales in the inaugural under 20s State of Origin match at Penrith Stadium.

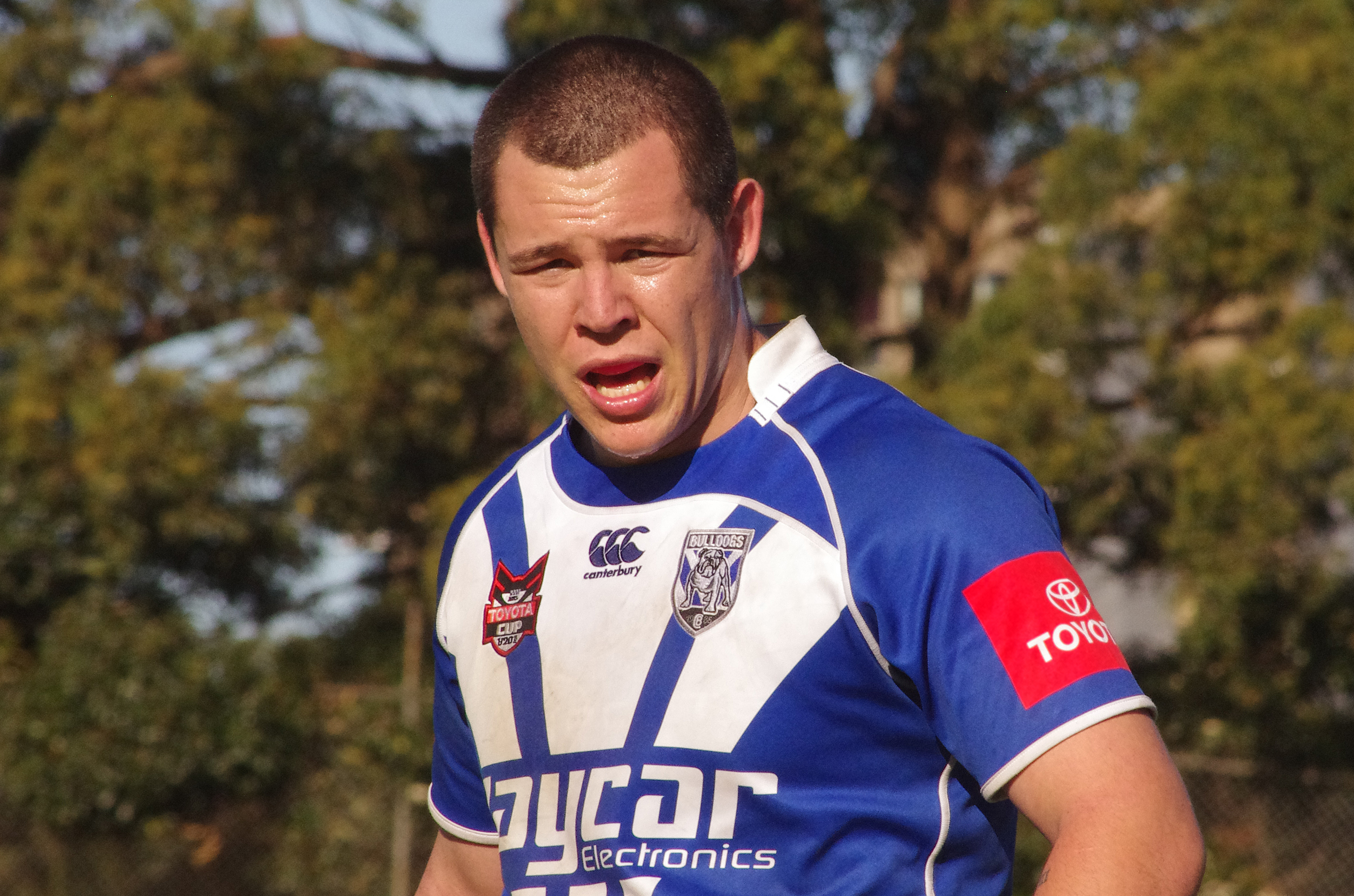
Klemmer playing for the Bulldogs in 2012

At the end of 2012, Klemmer was named NYC Player of the Year and also named at starting prop in the 2012 NYC Team of the Year.

=== 2013 ===
On 5 March 2013, Klemmer re-signed with the Canterbury-Bankstown club on a three-year contract. In round 1 of the 2013 NRL season, Klemmer made his NRL debut for Canterbury-Bankstown against the North Queensland Cowboys off the interchange bench in Canterbury's 12–24 loss at Central Coast Stadium. In round 3, against the Melbourne Storm at AAMI Park, Klemmer made headlines after he was at the end of receiving a high flying karate style kick from Melbourne's fullback Billy Slater to the head in Canterbury's 18–22 loss.

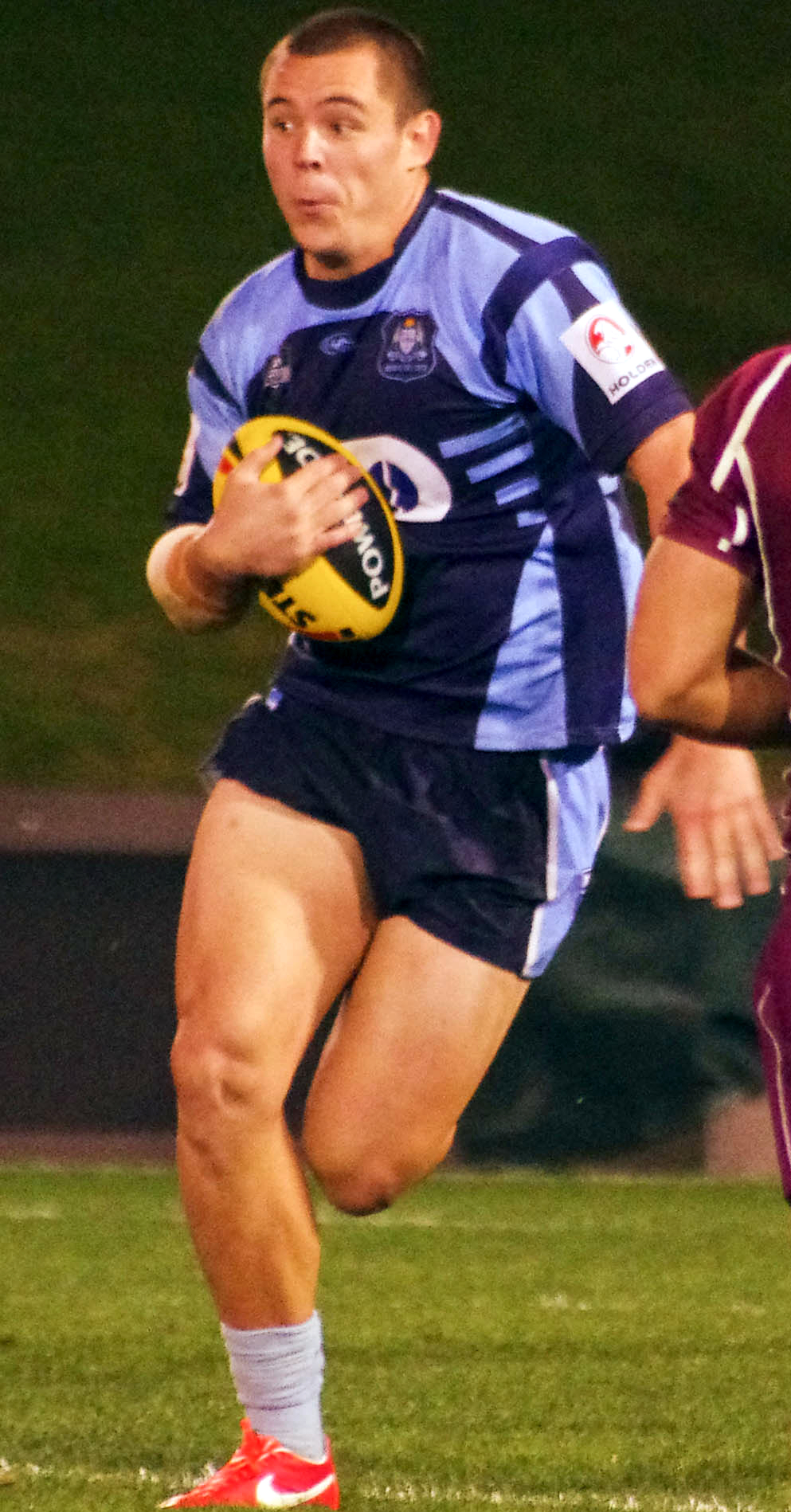
Klemmer playing for the NSW Under 20s side in 2013

On 20 April 2013, Klemmer was named captain of the New South Wales team in the under 20s State of Origin match, leading the team to a 36–12 victory over Queensland at Penrith Stadium. Klemmer debut season ended early after he sustained a knee injury. Klemmer finished his debut year with him playing 4 matches for Canterbury-Bankstown.

=== 2014 ===
In round 4 against the Melbourne Storm, Klemmer scored his first NRL career try in the Canterbury club's 40–12 win at nib Stadium in Perth. On 26 April 2014, Klemmer was selected to play for City Origin for the City vs Country Origin match at Apex Oval in Dubbo. Klemmer played off the interchange bench in the 26-all draw on 4 May 2014. On 5 October 2014, in Canterbury's 2014 NRL Grand Final against the South Sydney Rabbitohs, Klemmer played off the bench in the club's 6–30 loss. Klemmer finished the Canterbury club's 2014 season with him playing 23 matches and scoring a try. Klemmer made his international debut for Australia, playing against England at AAMI Park in Australia's 16–12 win.

=== 2015 ===
In round 5 of the 2015 NRL season, in the Grand Final re-match against the South Sydney Rabbitohs, Klemmer was sin binned after crowding in on referee Gerard Sutton alongside Canterbury captain James Graham and yelling "You're off your f***ing face". The Canterbury club were leading 17–16 at the time, but lost 17–18 at ANZ Stadium. After full-time was blown, some members of the Canterbury fan base pelted referee Gerard Sutton and match officials with plastic bottles, causing an investigation to find out and ban the misbehaving members from attending rugby league matches for life. Klemmer was later hit with a three-week suspension for contrary conduct. He returned in round 9, against the North Queensland Cowboys, in Canterbury's 23–16 loss at 1300SMILES Stadium. On 3 May, Klemmer played for New South Wales City, playing at prop in the 34–22 loss to New South Wales Country at Wagga Wagga. On 27 May, he was selected to make his State of Origin debut for New South Wales in game 1 against Queensland. He played of the interchange bench in the Blues' 11–10 loss at ANZ Stadium. In game 2 of the 2015 State of Origin series, he again made headlines after a heated exchange with the oldest member of the Queensland team, Corey Parker. Parker told Klemmer (the youngest member of the New South Wales team) to "show some respect" and Klemmer replied "get f***d you c**t". Klemmer also played in game 3, off the interchange bench, in the Blues' 52–6 record loss at Suncorp Stadium. He finished off the 2015 season having played in 21 matches and scoring a try for Canterbury-Bankstown.

=== 2016 ===
On 22 May 2016, Klemmer extended his contract with Canterbury-Bankstown until the end of the 2020 season. Klemmer played in all 3 matches for New South Wales off the interchange bench in the Blues 2–1 series loss in the 2016 State of Origin series. After Game 2, Klemmer got into some trouble after the Blues 26–16 loss to Queensland after he punched a wall in frustration in the toilets off the Suncorp Stadium changing rooms. Klemmer finished the 2016 NRL season with him playing in 22 matches and scoring a try for Canterbury-Bankstown. On 24 September 2016, Klemmer played for Prime Minister's XIII against Papua New Guinea, playing off the interchange bench in the 58–0 win at Port Moresby.

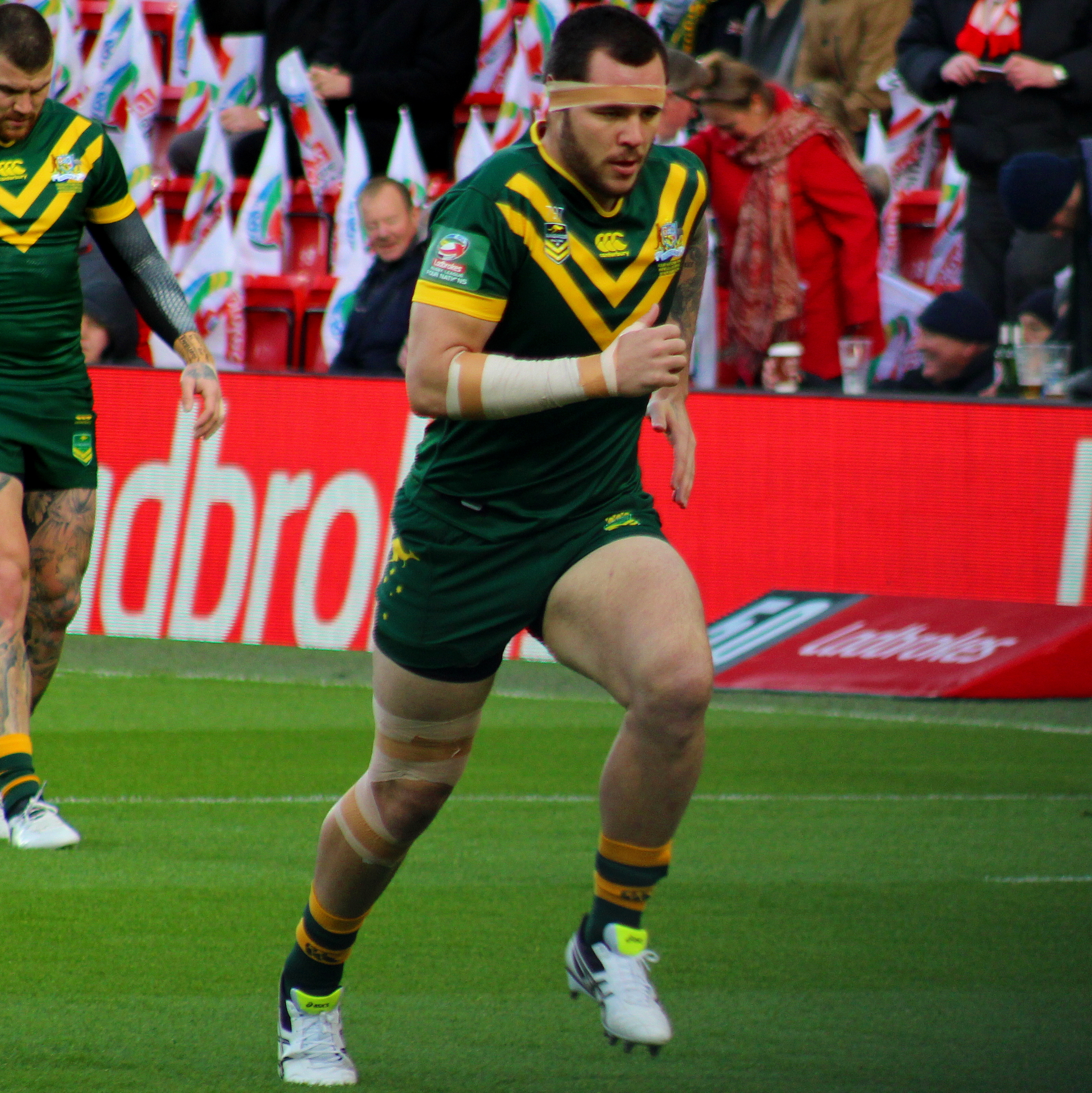
Klemmer playing for the Kangaroos in 2016

On 3 October 2016, Klemmer was selected in the 24-man Australian Kangaroos squad for the 2016 Four Nations. Klemmer played in all 5 matches of the tournament, including playing off the interchange bench in the Kangaroos 34-8 Four Nations final win against New Zealand at Anfield.

=== 2017 ===
In February, Klemmer was selected in Canterbury's 2017 NRL Auckland Nines squad. On 5 May, he played for Australia in the 2017 ANZAC Test where he started at prop in the 30–12 win at Canberra Stadium. In June 2017, it was rumoured that Klemmer requested a release from his contract from Canterbury-Bankstown due to a financial dispute stemming from his decision to split with long-time manager David Riolo. Klemmer later commented saying that he never wanted to leave Canterbury. For the 2017 State of Origin series, Klemmer played in all 3 matches off the interchange bench in the Blues 2–1 series loss. In the lead-up to Game 3, Klemmer was set to start at prop by coach Laurie Daley and with Andrew Fifita to come off the bench but rumours that Fifita blew up at Daley about the switch and he later reversed that decision and the Blues would later go on to lose the match 22–6. Klemmer was named as the winner of the Brad Fittler Medal for being the Blues Best Player of the series. Klemmer was the second player to receive the award by playing all 3 matches of the interchange bench. Klemmer finished the 2017 NRL season with him playing in 21 matches and scoring 1 try for the Bulldogs. On 3 October 2017, Klemmer was selected in the 24-man Australia Kangaroos 2017 Rugby League World Cup squad. Klemmer played in all 6 matches of the tournament, including starting at prop in the World Cup Final match against England in the hard-fought 6–0 victory at Suncorp Stadium.

=== 2018 ===
In 2018, Klemmer was selected to play for New South Wales in the 2018 State of Origin series which The Blues emerged victorious winning 2–1. In game 3, Klemmer was placed on report for an attempted trip on Queensland player Ben Hunt. Klemmer was later fined $1350 but escaped suspension.

Late in the year, Klemmer asked for a release from the final two years of his Canterbury contract. He was granted the release in November, signing a five-year contract with the Newcastle Knights starting in 2019.

=== 2019 ===
On 7 October 2019, Klemmer was named in the Australian side for the upcoming Oceania Cup fixtures.

=== 2020 ===
Klemmer played 21 games for Newcastle in the 2020 NRL season. He played in Newcastle's first finals game since 2013 which was a 46–20 loss against South Sydney in the elimination final.

=== 2021 ===
Klemmer made 21 appearances for Newcastle in the 2021 NRL season as the club qualified for the finals. Klemmer played in Newcastle's elimination final loss to Parramatta.

=== 2022 ===
In round 17 of the 2022 NRL season, Klemmer was sent off in Newcastle's 40–28 loss to South Sydney. On 2 August, Klemmer was stood down by the Newcastle club for an on-field incident which happened during the clubs round 20 loss to Canterbury. It was alleged that Klemmer refused to be substituted towards the end of the match and verbally abused a Newcastle trainer. On 16 November, Klemmer joined the Wests Tigers on a three-year deal in a player swap with Jackson Hastings.

=== 2023 ===
Klemmer played in all 24 of the Wests Tigers games for 2023. He was 9th in the competition for post-contact metres and 20th for run metres, leading the club in both statistics. The Wests Tigers would end up finishing with the wooden spoon for a second straight year.

=== 2024 ===
In round 4 of the 2024 NRL season, Wests Tigers won 17–16 over Parramatta at the Western Sydney Stadium. Parramatta's Clinton Gutherson had a penalty conversion after the full-time siren to win the match for Parramatta however he missed the kick with camera footage showing Klemmer doing a Bras d'honneur at Gutherson after the ball sailed wide of the posts. Klemmer was alleged by some fans online of cheating as he waved his arms and jumped in front of the goalposts as Gutherson moved to kick the ball, a distraction which is against the rules. Klemmer made 20 appearances for the Wests Tigers throughout the season as the club finished with the wooden spoon for a third consecutive season.

=== 2025 ===
On 13 March, Klemmer had signed a deal with the St. George Illawarra Dragons for the rest of the 2025 season. Klemmer made his club debut for St. George Illawarra in round 4 of the 2025 NRL season against Melbourne. Klemmer played a total of 22 games for St. George Illawarra in the 2025 NRL season as the club finished 15th on the table.

On 31 October it was announced that he had signed for St Helens on a two-year deal.

=== 2026 ===
On 7 February, Klemmer made his club debut for St Helens in their 98–2 victory over Workington Town in the third round of the Challenge Cup. Klemmer played 20 games for St Helens in the 2026 Super League season as the club finished 7th on the table and missed the playoffs.

== Statistics ==
Year	Team	Games	Tries	Pts
2013	Canterbury-Bankstown Bulldogs	4		
2014	Canterbury-Bankstown Bulldogs	23	1	4
2015	Canterbury-Bankstown Bulldogs	21	1	4
2016	Canterbury-Bankstown Bulldogs	22	1	4
2017	Canterbury-Bankstown Bulldogs	21	1	4
2018	Canterbury-Bankstown Bulldogs	22		
2019	Newcastle Knights	21		
2020	Newcastle Knights	21		
2021	Newcastle Knights	21		
2022	Newcastle Knights	18	1	4
2023	Wests Tigers	24	1	4
2024	Wests Tigers	20		
2025	St. George Illawarra Dragons	22		
2026	St Helens			
	Totals	260	6	24
