= 2017 NRL finals series =

- Duration: 9 Sep – 1 Oct 2017
- Teams: 8
- Premiers: Melbourne Storm (3rd title)
- Minor premiers: Melbourne Storm (3rd title)
- Matches played: 9
- Points scored: 315
- Highest attendance: 79,722 (Melbourne vs North Queensland Grand Final)
- Lowest attendance: 15,408 (Manly vs Penrith Elimination Final)
- Average attendance: 32,435
- Total attendance: 291,922
- Broadcast partners: Nine Network; Fox League
- Top points scorer(s): Ethan Lowe (28); Cameron Smith (28)
- Top try-scorer(s): Billy Slater (4); Josh Addo-Carr (4)

The 2017 NRL finals series was the 20th annual edition of the NRL final series, the Rugby League tournament staged to determine the winner of the 2017 NRL Season. The series ran over four weekends in September and October 2017, culminating with the 2017 NRL Grand Final at the ANZ Stadium on 1 October 2017.

The top eight teams from the 2017 NRL Season qualified for the finals series. NRL finals series have been played under the current format since 2012. The qualifying teams are Melbourne, Sydney, Brisbane, Parramatta, Cronulla-Sutherland, Manly Warringah, Penrith and North Queensland.

The preliminary finals are the same four teams as the 2015 finals series.

== Qualification ==
2017 NRL season
Pos	Team	Pld	W	D	L	B	PF	PA	PD	Pts
1	Melbourne Storm (P)	24	20	0	4	2	633	336	+297	44
2	Sydney Roosters	24	17	0	7	2	500	428	+72	38
3	Brisbane Broncos	24	16	0	8	2	597	433	+164	36
4	Parramatta Eels	24	16	0	8	2	496	457	+39	36
5	Cronulla-Sutherland Sharks	24	15	0	9	2	476	407	+69	34
6	Manly-Warringah Sea Eagles	24	14	0	10	2	552	512	+40	32
7	Penrith Panthers	24	13	0	11	2	504	459	+45	30
8	North Queensland Cowboys	24	13	0	11	2	467	443	+24	30
9	St. George Illawarra Dragons	24	12	0	12	2	533	450	+83	28
10	Canberra Raiders	24	11	0	13	2	558	497	+61	26
11	Canterbury-Bankstown Bulldogs	24	10	0	14	2	360	455	−95	24
12	South Sydney Rabbitohs	24	9	0	15	2	464	564	−100	22
13	New Zealand Warriors	24	7	0	17	2	444	575	−131	18
14	Wests Tigers	24	7	0	17	2	413	571	−158	18
15	Gold Coast Titans	24	7	0	17	2	448	638	−190	18
16	Newcastle Knights	24	5	0	19	2	428	648	−220	14

Melbourne qualified for their 7th straight finals series, it was also their 2nd straight first-place finish. Sydney returned to the finals after missing out in 2016. Brisbane qualified for the 4th straight year. Parramatta made their first finals appearance since the 2009 Grand Final, it was also their first top four finish since 2005. Cronulla returned to the finals for the 3rd straight year after winning the 2016 NRL Grand Final. Manly played their first finals game since 2014. Penrith returned to the finals after competing in the 2016 finals series. North Queensland qualified for their 7th straight finals series, giving them and Melbourne the best current finals streak.

== Venues ==
The matches of the 2017 NRL finals series were contested at four venues in three different states around the country.

Melbourne's AAMI Park hosted 2 matches, Brisbane's Suncorp Stadium hosted 1 match and Sydney hosted the remaining 6 matches, which were played at Allianz Stadium and ANZ Stadium.

Melbourne	2017 NRL finals series is located in Australia	Sydney
AAMI Park	2017 NRL finals series is located in Australia	Allianz Stadium
Capacity: 29,500	2017 NRL finals series is located in Australia	Capacity: 45,500
Brisbane	2017 NRL finals series is located in Australia	Sydney
Suncorp Stadium	2017 NRL finals series is located in Australia	ANZ Stadium
Capacity: 52,500	2017 NRL finals series is located in Australia	Capacity: 83,500

== Finals Structure ==
The system used for the 2017 NRL finals series is a final eight system. The top four teams in the eight receive the "double chance" when they play in week-one qualifying finals, such that if a top-four team loses in the first week it still remains in the finals, playing a semi-final the next week against the winner of an elimination final. The bottom four of the eight play knock-out games – only the winners survive and move on to the next week. Home-state advantage goes to the team with the higher ladder position in the first two weeks, to the qualifying final winners in the third week.

In the second week, the winners of the qualifying finals receive a bye to the third week. The losers of the qualifying final plays the elimination finals winners in a semi-final. In the third week, the winners of the semi-finals from week two play the winners of the qualifying finals in the first week. The winners of those matches move on to the Grand Final at ANZ Stadium in Sydney

Qualifying and elimination finals
9 September – Melbourne
1	Melbourne Storm	18
4	Parramatta Eels	16
10 September – Sydney
5	Cronulla-Sutherland Sharks	14
8	North Queensland Cowboys	15
9 September – Sydney
6	Manly-Warringah Sea Eagles	10
7	Penrith Panthers	22
8 September – Sydney
2	Sydney Roosters	24
3	Brisbane Broncos	22

Semi-finals
16 September – Sydney
Parramatta Eels	16
North Queensland Cowboys	24
15 September – Brisbane
Brisbane Broncos	13
Penrith Panthers	6

Preliminary finals
22 September – Melbourne
Melbourne Storm	30
Brisbane Broncos	0
23 September – Sydney
Sydney Roosters	16
North Queensland Cowboys	29

Grand final
1 October – Sydney
Melbourne Storm	34
North Queensland Cowboys	6

== Qualifying & Elimination Finals ==
=== 1st Qualifying final ===
Friday, 8 September
7:55pm

Sydney Roosters	24 – 22	Brisbane Broncos
Tries: Aidan Guerra (13') 1 Boyd Cordner (19') 1 Luke Keary (44') 1 Latrell Mitchell (75') 1 Goals: Michael Gordon 4/5 (14', 20', 26' pen, 76')	1st: 14 – 6; 2nd: 10 – 16	Tries: 2 (50', 71') Corey Oates; 1 (37') James Roberts; 1 (69') Ben Hunt; Goals: 3/4 Jordan Kahu (38', 70', 73')

Allianz Stadium, Sydney
Attendance: 21,212
Referee: Matt Cecchin, Alan Shortall
Player of the Match: Boyd Cordner

Team lists:

FB	1	Michael Gordon
LW	3	Latrell Mitchell
LC	16	Ryan Matterson
RC	4	Mitchell Aubusson
RW	5	Blake Ferguson
FE	6	Luke Keary
HB	7	Mitchell Pearce
PR	8	Jared Waerea-Hargreaves
HK	9	Jake Friend (c)
PR	10	Dylan Napa
SR	11	Boyd Cordner (c)
SR	12	Aidan Guerra
LK	13	Isaac Liu
Substitutes:
IC	14	Kane Evans
IC	15	Sio Siua Taukeiaho
IC	17	Connor Watson
IC	23	Daniel Tupou
Coach:
Trent Robinson

FB	5	Jordan Kahu
LW	2	Corey Oates
RC	3	James Roberts
LC	4	Tautau Moga
RW	14	David Mead
FE	6	Anthony Milford
HB	7	Benji Marshall
PR	8	Sam Thaiday
HK	9	Ben Hunt
PR	10	Adam Blair (c)
SR	11	Alex Glenn
SR	12	Matt Gillett
LK	13	Josh McGuire
Substitutes:
IC	1	Kodi Nikorima
IC	15	Jai Arrow
IC	16	Joe Ofahengaue
IC	17	Herman Ese'ese
Coach:
Wayne Bennett

=== 2nd Qualifying final ===
Saturday, 9 September
4:10pm

Melbourne Storm	18 – 16	Parramatta Eels
Tries: Josh Addo-Carr (4') 1 Kenny Bromwich (46') 1 Billy Slater (50') 1 Goals: Cameron Smith 3/4 (47', 51', 63' pen); Sin Bin: Cameron Munster (23')	1st: 4 – 10; 2nd: 14 – 6	Tries: 1 (24') Kirisome Auva'a; 1 (31') Will Smith; 1 (66') Semi Radradra; Goals: 2/3 Mitchell Moses (33', 67')

AAMI Park, Melbourne
Attendance: 22,626
Referee: Ben Cummins, Chris Sutton
Player of the Match: Cameron Smith

Team lists:

FB	1	Billy Slater
RW	2	Suliasi Vunivalu
RC	3	Will Chambers
LC	4	Curtis Scott
LW	5	Josh Addo-Carr
FE	6	Cameron Munster
HB	7	Cooper Cronk
PR	8	Jesse Bromwich
HK	9	Cameron Smith (c)
PR	10	Jordan McLean
SR	11	Felise Kaufusi
SR	12	Tohu Harris
LK	13	Dale Finucane
Substitutes:
IC	14	Kenny Bromwich
IC	15	Nelson Asofa-Solomona
IC	16	Tim Glasby
IC	17	Slade Griffin
Coach:
Craig Bellamy

FB	1	Will Smith
LW	2	Semi Radradra
LC	3	Michael Jennings
RC	4	Brad Takairangi
RW	5	Kirisome Auva'a
FE	6	Corey Norman
HB	7	Mitchell Moses
PR	8	Daniel Alvaro
HK	9	Cameron King
PR	10	Tim Mannah (c)
SR	11	Manu Maʻu
SR	12	Tepai Moeroa
LK	13	Nathan Brown
Substitutes:
IC	14	Beau Scott (c)
IC	15	Kenny Edwards
IC	16	Siosaia Vave
IC	17	Suaia Matagi
Coach:
Brad Arthur

=== 1st Elimination final ===
Saturday, 9 September
7:40pm

Manly-Warringah Sea Eagles	10 – 22	Penrith Panthers
Tries: Dylan Walker (26') 1 Lewis Brown (62') 1 Goals: Matthew Wright 1/2 (63')	1st: 4 – 10; 2nd: 6 – 12	Tries: 2 (34', 79') Bryce Cartwright; 1 (74') Tyrone Peachey; Goals: 5/5 Nathan Cleary (3' pen, 35', 40' pen, 75', 80')

Allianz Stadium, Sydney
Attendance: 15,408
Referee: Gerard Sutton, Adam Gee
Player of the Match: Nathan Cleary

Team lists:

FB	1	Tom Trbojevic
LW	2	Matthew Wright
LC	3	Dylan Walker
RC	4	Brian Kelly
RW	5	Akuila Uate
FE	6	Blake Green
HB	7	Daly Cherry-Evans (c)
PR	8	Darcy Lussick
HK	9	Apisai Koroisau
PR	10	Martin Taupau
SR	11	Frank Winterstein
SR	12	Curtis Sironen
LK	13	Jake Trbojevic
Substitutes:
IC	14	Lewis Brown
IC	15	Lloyd Perrett
IC	16	Brenton Lawrence
IC	17	Addin Fonua-Blake
Coach:
Trent Barrett

FB	20	Dylan Edwards
LW	2	Josh Mansour
LC	3	Tyrone Peachey
RC	1	Dean Whare
RW	5	Dallin Watene-Zelezniak
FE	6	Tyrone May
HB	7	Nathan Cleary
PR	8	James Tamou
HK	9	Peter Wallace (c)
PR	10	Reagan Campbell-Gillard
SR	11	Corey Harawira-Naera
SR	12	Isaah Yeo
LK	13	Trent Merrin
Substitutes:
IC	14	Sione Katoa
IC	15	Bryce Cartwright
IC	17	James Fisher-Harris
IC	18	Moses Leota
Coach:
Anthony Griffin

=== 2nd Elimination final ===
Sunday, 10 September
4:10pm

Cronulla-Sutherland Sharks	14 – 15	North Queensland Cowboys
Tries: Chad Townsend (3') 1 Jack Bird (56') 1 Goals: James Maloney 3/3 (4', 18' pen, 57'); Sin Bin: James Maloney (40')	1st: 8 – 2; 2nd: 6 – 12; ET1: 0 – 1 ET2: 0 - 0	Tries: 1 (49') Kyle Feldt; 1 (63') Jason Taumalolo; Goals: 3/4 Ethan Lowe (40' pen, 64', 78' pen); Field Goals: 1 (85') Michael Morgan

Allianz Stadium, Sydney
Attendance: 16,115
Referee: Ashley Klein, Gavin Badger
Player of the Match: Jason Taumalolo

Team lists:

FB	1	Valentine Holmes
RW	2	Sosaia Feki
RC	3	Jack Bird
LC	4	Ricky Leutele
LW	5	Gerard Beale
FE	6	James Maloney
HB	7	Chad Townsend
PR	8	Andrew Fifita
HK	9	Jayden Brailey
PR	10	Matt Prior
SR	11	Luke Lewis
SR	12	Wade Graham
LK	13	Paul Gallen (c)
Substitutes:
IC	14	Jayson Bukuya
IC	15	Chris Heighington
IC	16	Jeremy Latimore
IC	17	James Segeyaro
Coach:
Shane Flanagan

FB	1	Lachlan Coote
RW	2	Kyle Feldt
LC	3	Javid Bowen
RC	4	Kane Linnett
LW	5	Antonio Winterstein
FE	6	Te Maire Martin
HB	7	Michael Morgan
PR	17	Shaun Fensom
HK	9	Jake Granville
PR	10	Scott Bolton
SR	11	Gavin Cooper (c)
SR	12	Ethan Lowe
LK	13	Jason Taumalolo
Substitutes:
IC	14	Ben Hampton
IC	15	Coen Hess
IC	16	Corey Jensen
IC	8	John Asiata
Coach:
Paul Green

== Semi-finals ==
=== 1st Semi-final ===
Friday, 15 September
8:15pm

Brisbane Broncos	13 – 6	Penrith Panthers
Tries: Corey Oates (7') 1 James Roberts (47') 1 Goals: Jordan Kahu 2/4 (14' pen, 48'); Field Goals: Jordan Kahu (70') 1	1st: 6 – 0; 2nd: 7 – 6	Tries: 1 (64') Reagan Campbell-Gillard; Goals: 1/1 Nathan Cleary (65')

Suncorp Stadium, Brisbane
Attendance: 38,623
Referee: Gerard Sutton, Adam Gee
Player of the Match: Alex Glenn

Team lists:

FB	1	Kodi Nikorima
LW	2	Corey Oates
RC	3	James Roberts
LC	4	Tautau Moga
RW	5	Jordan Kahu
FE	6	Anthony Milford
HB	7	Benji Marshall
PR	8	Sam Thaiday
HK	9	Ben Hunt
PR	10	Adam Blair (c)
SR	11	Alex Glenn
SR	12	Matt Gillett
LK	13	Josh McGuire
Substitutes:
IC	14	David Mead
IC	15	Jai Arrow
IC	16	Joe Ofahengaue
IC	17	Herman Ese'ese
Coach:
Wayne Bennett

FB	1	Dylan Edwards
LW	2	Josh Mansour
LC	3	Tyrone Peachey
RC	4	Dean Whare
RW	5	Dallin Watene-Zelezniak
FE	6	Tyrone May
HB	7	Nathan Cleary
PR	8	James Tamou
HK	9	Peter Wallace (c)
PR	10	Reagan Campbell-Gillard
SR	11	Corey Harawira-Naera
SR	12	Isaah Yeo
LK	13	Trent Merrin
Substitutes:
IC	14	Sione Katoa
IC	15	Bryce Cartwright
IC	16	Moses Leota
IC	17	James Fisher-Harris
Coach:
Anthony Griffin

=== 2nd Semi-final ===
Saturday, 16 September
7:45pm

Parramatta Eels	16 – 24	North Queensland Cowboys
Tries: Semi Radradra (7') 1 Will Smith (31') 1 Michael Jennings (80') 1 Goals: Mitchell Moses 2/3 (8', 80')	1st: 10 – 6; 2nd: 6 – 18	Tries: 1 (11') Kyle Feldt; 1 (45') John Asiata; 1 (52') Coen Hess; 1 (75') Michael Morgan; Goals: 4/4 Ethan Lowe (12', 46', 53', 76')

ANZ Stadium, Sydney
Attendance: 41,287
Referee: Matt Cecchin, Ben Cummins
Player of the Match: Michael Morgan

Team lists:

FB	1	Will Smith
LW	2	Semi Radradra
LC	3	Michael Jennings
RC	4	Brad Takairangi
RW	5	Kirisome Auva'a
FE	6	Corey Norman
HB	7	Mitchell Moses
PR	8	Daniel Alvaro
HK	9	Cameron King
PR	10	Tim Mannah (c)
SR	11	Manu Maʻu
SR	15	Kenny Edwards
LK	13	Nathan Brown
Substitutes:
IC	14	Beau Scott (c)
IC	17	Suaia Matagi
IC	18	Kaysa Pritchard
IC	19	Peni Terepo
Coach:
Brad Arthur

FB	1	Lachlan Coote
RW	2	Kyle Feldt
LC	19	Justin O'Neill
RC	4	Kane Linnett
LW	5	Antonio Winterstein
FE	6	Te Maire Martin
HB	7	Michael Morgan
PR	17	Shaun Fensom
HK	9	Jake Granville
PR	10	Scott Bolton
SR	11	Gavin Cooper (c)
SR	12	Ethan Lowe
LK	13	Jason Taumalolo
Substitutes:
IC	8	John Asiata
IC	14	Ben Hampton
IC	15	Coen Hess
IC	16	Corey Jensen
Coach:
Paul Green

== Preliminary Finals ==
=== 1st Preliminary final ===
Friday, 22 September
8:15pm

Melbourne Storm	30 – 0	Brisbane Broncos
Tries: Billy Slater (60', 71') 2 Josh Addo-Carr (39') 1 Nelson Asofa-Solomona (66') 1 Goals: Cameron Smith 6/6 (19' pen, 40', 61', 67', 70' pen, 73'); Tohu Harris 1/1 (79')	1st: 8 – 0; 2nd: 22 – 0

AAMI Park, Melbourne
Attendance: 28,821
Referee: Matt Cecchin, Ben Cummins
Player of the Match: Cooper Cronk

Team lists:

FB	1	Billy Slater
RW	2	Suliasi Vunivalu
RC	3	Will Chambers
LC	4	Curtis Scott
LW	5	Josh Addo-Carr
FE	6	Cameron Munster
HB	7	Cooper Cronk
PR	8	Jesse Bromwich
HK	9	Cameron Smith (c)
PR	10	Jordan McLean
SR	11	Felise Kaufusi
SR	12	Tohu Harris
LK	13	Dale Finucane
Substitutes:
IC	14	Kenny Bromwich
IC	15	Nelson Asofa-Solomona
IC	16	Tim Glasby
IC	17	Slade Griffin
Coach:
Craig Bellamy

FB	1	Darius Boyd (c)
LW	2	Corey Oates
RC	3	James Roberts
LC	4	Tautau Moga
RW	5	Jordan Kahu
FE	6	Anthony Milford
HB	7	Kodi Nikorima
PR	8	Sam Thaiday
HK	9	Ben Hunt
PR	10	Adam Blair
SR	11	Alex Glenn
SR	12	Matt Gillett
LK	13	Josh McGuire
Substitutes:
IC	14	Benji Marshall
IC	15	Tevita Pangai Junior
IC	16	Joe Ofahengaue
IC	17	Herman Ese'ese
Coach:
Wayne Bennett

=== 2nd Preliminary final ===
Saturday, 23 September
7:45pm

Sydney Roosters	16 – 29	North Queensland Cowboys
Tries: Latrell Mitchell (37') 1 Connor Watson (46') 1 Blake Ferguson (61') 1 Goals: Michael Gordon 2/3 (39', 47')	1st: 6 – 8; 2nd: 10 – 21	Tries: 1 (24') Te Maire Martin; 1 (55') Kane Linnett; 1 (66') Kyle Feldt; 1 (80') Scott Bolton; Goals: 6/6 Ethan Lowe (21' pen, 26', 56', 67', 71' pen, 80'); Field Goals: 1 (77') Michael Morgan

Allianz Stadium, Sydney
Attendance: 28,108
Referee: Gerard Sutton, Adam Gee
Player of the Match: Michael Morgan

Team lists:

FB	1	Michael Gordon
LW	3	Latrell Mitchell
LC	14	Ryan Matterson
RC	4	Mitchell Aubusson
RW	5	Blake Ferguson
FE	6	Luke Keary
HB	7	Mitchell Pearce
PR	8	Jared Waerea-Hargreaves
HK	9	Jake Friend (c)
PR	10	Dylan Napa
SR	11	Boyd Cordner (c)
SR	12	Aidan Guerra
LK	13	Isaac Liu
Substitutes:
IC	2	Daniel Tupou
IC	15	Sio Siua Taukeiaho
IC	16	Zane Tetevano
IC	17	Connor Watson
Coach:
Trent Robinson

FB	1	Lachlan Coote
RW	2	Kyle Feldt
LC	3	Justin O'Neill
RC	4	Kane Linnett
LW	5	Antonio Winterstein
FE	6	Te Maire Martin
HB	7	Michael Morgan
PR	17	Shaun Fensom
HK	9	Jake Granville
PR	10	Scott Bolton
SR	11	Gavin Cooper (c)
SR	12	Ethan Lowe
LK	13	Jason Taumalolo
Substitutes:
IC	14	Ben Hampton
IC	15	Coen Hess
IC	16	Corey Jensen
IC	8	John Asiata
Coach:
Paul Green

== Grand Final ==
Sunday, 1 October
7:30pm

Melbourne Storm	34 – 6	North Queensland Cowboys
Tries: Josh Addo-Carr (20', 73') 2 Felise Kaufusi (28') 1 Billy Slater (38') 1 Dale Finucane (64') 1 Curtis Scott (67') 1 Goals: Cameron Smith 5/6 (21', 29', 39', 65', 75')	1st: 18 – 0; 2nd: 16 – 6	Tries: 1 (48') Te Maire Martin; Goals: 1/1 Ethan Lowe (49')

ANZ Stadium, Sydney
Attendance: 79,722
Referee: Matt Cecchin, Gerard Sutton
Clive Churchill Medal: Billy Slater

Team lists:

FB	1	Billy Slater
RW	2	Suliasi Vunivalu
RC	3	Will Chambers
LC	4	Curtis Scott
LW	5	Josh Addo-Carr
FE	6	Cameron Munster
HB	7	Cooper Cronk
PR	8	Jesse Bromwich
HK	9	Cameron Smith (c)
PR	10	Jordan McLean
SR	11	Felise Kaufusi
SR	12	Tohu Harris
LK	13	Dale Finucane
Substitutes:
IC	14	Kenny Bromwich
IC	15	Nelson Asofa-Solomona
IC	16	Tim Glasby
IC	17	Slade Griffin
Coach:
Craig Bellamy

FB	1	Lachlan Coote
RW	2	Kyle Feldt
LC	3	Justin O'Neill
RC	4	Kane Linnett
LW	5	Antonio Winterstein
FE	6	Te Maire Martin
HB	7	Michael Morgan
PR	17	Shaun Fensom
HK	9	Jake Granville
PR	10	Scott Bolton
SR	11	Gavin Cooper (c)
SR	12	Ethan Lowe
LK	13	Jason Taumalolo
Substitutes:
IC	14	Ben Hampton
IC	15	Coen Hess
IC	16	Corey Jensen
IC	8	John Asiata
Coach:
Paul Green
