= 2017 Parramatta Eels season =

Australia Rugby League Parramatta Eels 2019 season

- NRL Rank: 4th
- Play-off result: Semi-finalists (Lost 16–24 vs North Queensland Cowboys, 2nd Semi Final)
- World Club Challenge: DNQ
- Auckland Nines: Semi-finalists (Lost 0–13 vs Penrith Panthers, 1st Semi Final)
- 2017 record: Wins: 16; draws: 0; losses: 8
- Points scored: For: 496; against: 457

Team information
- CEO: Bernie Gurr
- Coach: (Australia) Brad Arthur
- Captain: (Lebanon) Tim Mannah (Australia) Beau Scott
- Stadium: ANZ Stadium (Capacity: 83,500); TIO Stadium (Capacity: 12,500)
- Avg. attendance: 14,346 (Home); 15,288 (Home & Away); 31,956 (Finals Series)
- Agg. attendance: 172,156 (Home); 366,909 (Home & Away); 63,913 (Finals Series)
- High attendance: 41,287 (16 September vs North Queensland Cowboys, 2nd Semi Final)

Top scorers
- Tries: (Fiji) Semi Radradra (22)
- Goals: (Australia) Clinton Gutherson (49)
- Points: (Australia) Clinton Gutherson (142)
← 2016	List of seasons	2018 →

The 2017 Parramatta Eels season is the 71st in the club's history. Coached by Brad Arthur and co-captained by Tim Mannah and Beau Scott, they are competing in the NRL's 2017 Telstra Premiership.

== Summary ==
Parramatta started the 2017 season off with victories over Manly and St. George Illawarra before succumbing to four straight losses. In the Easter Monday game against the Wests Tigers, Parramatta trailed the game 16-10 but came back in the second half to win 26-22. At the midway point of the season, Parramatta sat ninth on the table before going on to win nine of their next ten matches to finish fourth and qualify for their first finals series since 2009. The club would go into the finals series without Clinton Gutherson and Bevan French who both suffered season ending injuries.

In week one of the finals, Parramatta narrowly lost 18-16 to Minor Premiers Melbourne in a controversial match at AAMI Park with Melbourne scoring two questionable tries which were not checked by the NRL bunker. With 30 seconds remaining, Melbourne player Will Chambers performed what seemed to be a voluntary tackle which was not penalised by the referee which would have given Parramatta a chance at a penalty goal right in front of the posts to make it 18-18. In week two of the finals, Parramatta hosted North Queensland who had only qualified for the finals due to St. George Illawarra failing to win their final regular season match. North Queensland were also depleted by injuries with star players Johnathan Thurston and Matthew Scott being ruled out. Parramatta held a 10-6 lead at half-time but suffered a second half capitulation losing 24-16 which ended their season.

== Squad information ==
- This section lists players who were in Parramatta's first grade squad at any point during the 2017 season
- Asterisks indicates player left mid-season
- Caret symbol indicates player joined mid-season
- Hash symbol indicates player retired mid-season

Nat.	Name	Position	Date of birth (age)	Joined	Signed from
(Australia)	Daniel Alvaro	PR		2015	Youth
(Samoa)	Kirisome Auva'a	CE		2017	South Sydney Rabbitohs
(Australia)	Nathan Brown	PR / SR / LK		2017	South Sydney Rabbitohs
(Australia)	Troy Dargan	HB		2017	Youth
(Australia)	Nathan Davis^	FB / CE / WG		2017	Gold Coast Titans
(Portugal)	Isaac De Gois	HK		2014	Cronulla Sharks
(New Zealand)	Kenny Edwards	SR / LK		2013	Southport Tigers
(United States)	Bureta Faraimo*	WG		2014	Mackay Cutters
(Australia)	Jamal Fogarty*	HB		2017	Burleigh Bears
(Tonga)	John Folau	WG / CE		2015	Youth
(Australia)	Bevan French	FB		2016	Youth
(Australia)	David Gower	SR / LK / PR		2014	Manly Sea Eagles
(Australia)	Clinton Gutherson	FB / CE / WG		2016	Manly Sea Eagles
(Ireland)	James Hasson*	SR / PR		2016	Manly Sea Eagles
(New Zealand)	Josh Hoffman	FB / CE / WG / FE		2017	Gold Coast Titans
(Australia)	George Jennings	CE / WG		2017	Penrith Panthers
(Tonga)	Michael Jennings	CE		2016	Sydney Roosters
(Australia)	Cameron King	HK		2016	North Queensland Cowboys
(New Zealand)	Manu Ma'u	SR		2014	Wentworthville Magpies
(Australia)	Tim Mannah	PR		2009	Youth
(Samoa)	Suaia Matagi	PR		2017	Penrith Panthers
(Australia)	Tepai Moeroa	SR		2014	Youth
(Australia)	Jack Morris	SR		2017	Youth
(Australia)	Mitchell Moses^	HB		2017	Wests Tigers
(Australia)	Cody Nelson	SR / FE		2015	Gold Coast Titans
(Cook Islands)	Marata Niukore	SR / CE		2017	New Zealand Warriors
(Australia)	Corey Norman	FE / FB		2014	Brisbane Broncos
(Australia)	Rory O'Brien	PR		2016	St George Illawarra Dragons
(Samoa)	Frank Pritchard	SR		2017	Hull FC
(Samoa)	Kaysa Pritchard	HK		2013	Youth
(Australia)	Semi Radradra	WG		2013	Youth
(Australia)	Jeff Robson	HB / FE / HK		2016	New Zealand Warriors
(Australia)	Scott Schulte	WG		2016	North Queensland Cowboys
(Australia)	Beau Scott	SR / CE		2016	Newcastle Knights
(Australia)	Will Smith	FE / FB / CE		2017	Penrith Panthers
(Cook Islands)	Brad Takairangi	SR / CE		2015	Gold Coast Titans
(Australia)	Kelepi Tanginoa*	SR / LK		2016	North Queensland Cowboys
(Tonga)	Peni Terepo	PR / SR / LK		2013	Youth
(Australia)	Honeti Tuha	WG		2016	Newcastle Knights
(Australia)	Alex Twal*	PR		2016	Youth
(Australia)	Joseph Ualesi	SR / LK		2013	Youth
(Tonga)	Siosaia Vave	PR		2017	Manly Sea Eagles
(Australia)	Matthew Woods	LK / SR		2016	Wests Tigers

== Transfers ==
In:

Nat.	Pos.	Name	From	Transfer window	Date	Ref.
(Tonga)	PR	Siosaia Vave	Manly Sea Eagles	Pre-season	August 2016
(Australia)	PR	Nathan Brown	South Sydney Rabbitohs	Pre-season	September 2016
(Australia)	CE	George Jennings	Penrith Panthers	Pre-season	September 2016
(New Zealand)	FB	Josh Hoffman	Gold Coast Titans	Pre-season	October 2016
(Samoa)	CE	Kirisome Auva'a	South Sydney Rabbitohs	Pre-season	November 2016
(Australia)	FE	Will Smith	Penrith Panthers	Pre-season	November 2016
(Australia)	HB	Jamal Fogarty	Burleigh Bears	Pre-season	November 2016
(Cook Islands)	SR	Marata Niukore	New Zealand Warriors	Pre-season	November 2016
(Australia)	SR	Jack Morris	Youth	Pre-season	November 2016
(Samoa)	PR	Suaia Matagi	Penrith Panthers	Pre-season	November 2016
(Samoa)	SR	Frank Pritchard	Hull FC	Pre-season	November 2016
(Australia)	FB	Nathan Davis	Gold Coast Titans	Mid-season	March 2017
(Australia)	FE	Mitchell Moses	Wests Tigers	Mid-season	May 2017

Out:

Nat.	Pos.	Name	To	Transfer window	Date	Ref.
(Australia)	SR	Anthony Watmough	Retired	Pre-season	May 2016
(Australia)	FB	Michael Gordon	Sydney Roosters	Pre-season	June 2016
(Australia)	CE	Tyrell Fuimaono	South Sydney Rabbitohs	Pre-season	August 2016
(Australia)	HB	Luke Kelly	South Sydney Rabbitohs	Pre-season	October 2016
(Australia)	HB	Mitch Cornish	Sydney Roosters	Pre-season	October 2016
(Australia)	PR	Danny Wicks	Retired	Pre-season	November 2016
(Tonga)	WG	Vai Toutai	Released	Pre-season	January 2017
(Ireland)	PR	James Hasson	Salford Red Devils	Mid-season	May 2017
(Australia)	HB	Jamal Fogarty	Gold Coast Titans	Mid-season	June 2017
(Australia)	PR	Alex Twal	Wests Tigers	Mid-season	June 2017
(United States)	WG	Bureta Faraimo	New Zealand Warriors	Mid-season	June 2017
(Australia)	SR	Kelepi Tanginoa	Manly Sea Eagles	Mid-season	June 2017

== Auckland Nines ==
=== Pool table ===
Team	Pld	W	D	L	PF	PA	PD	Pts
Parramatta Eels	3	3	0	0	66	23	+43	6
Manly Warringah Sea Eagles	3	2	0	1	50	48	+2	4
St George Illawarra Dragons	3	1	0	2	45	65	−20	2
New Zealand Warriors	3	0	0	3	21	46	−25	0

=== Bracket ===
Quarter-finals
Penrith Panthers	16
Manly Sea Eagles	12
Parramatta Eels	14
Gold Coast Titans	0
Brisbane Broncos	14
Sydney Roosters	15
North Queensland Cowboys	12
Melbourne Storm	25

Semi-finals
Penrith Panthers	13
Parramatta Eels	0
Sydney Roosters	21
Melbourne Storm	16

Final
Penrith Panthers	8
Sydney Roosters	10

=== Matches ===
Match No.	Home	Score	Away	Match Information
Match No.	Home	Score	Away	Date and time (Local)	Venue	Attendance
1	St George Illawarra Dragons	11 – 32	Parramatta Eels	Saturday, 4 February, 12:50 PM	Eden Park	22,000
2	New Zealand Warriors	0 – 17	Parramatta Eels	Saturday, 4 February, 5:10 PM	Eden Park	22,000
3	Manly Sea Eagles	12 – 17	Parramatta Eels	Sunday, 5 February, 11:25 AM	Eden Park	22,000
QF	Parramatta Eels	17 – 0	Gold Coast Titans	Sunday, 5 February, 2:20 PM	Eden Park	22,000
SF	Penrith Panthers	13 – 0	Parramatta Eels	Sunday, 5 February, 4:40 PM	Eden Park	22,000
GF	Did not qualify				Eden Park	22,000

== Pre-season ==
Round	Home	Score	Away	Match Information
Round	Home	Score	Away	Date and time (Local)	Venue	Attendance
1	Parramatta Eels	18 – 30	Gold Coast Titans	Saturday, 11 February, 7:30 PM	ANZAC Oval	2,207
2	Penrith Panthers	18 – 6	Parramatta Eels	Saturday, 18 February, 7:10 PM	Penrith Stadium

== Home and away season ==
=== League table ===
2017 NRL season
Pos	Team	Pld	W	D	L	B	PF	PA	PD	Pts
1	Melbourne Storm (P)	24	20	0	4	2	633	336	+297	44
2	Sydney Roosters	24	17	0	7	2	500	428	+72	38
3	Brisbane Broncos	24	16	0	8	2	597	433	+164	36
4	Parramatta Eels	24	16	0	8	2	496	457	+39	36
5	Cronulla-Sutherland Sharks	24	15	0	9	2	476	407	+69	34
6	Manly-Warringah Sea Eagles	24	14	0	10	2	552	512	+40	32
7	Penrith Panthers	24	13	0	11	2	504	459	+45	30
8	North Queensland Cowboys	24	13	0	11	2	467	443	+24	30
9	St. George Illawarra Dragons	24	12	0	12	2	533	450	+83	28
10	Canberra Raiders	24	11	0	13	2	558	497	+61	26
11	Canterbury-Bankstown Bulldogs	24	10	0	14	2	360	455	−95	24
12	South Sydney Rabbitohs	24	9	0	15	2	464	564	−100	22
13	New Zealand Warriors	24	7	0	17	2	444	575	−131	18
14	Wests Tigers	24	7	0	17	2	413	571	−158	18
15	Gold Coast Titans	24	7	0	17	2	448	638	−190	18
16	Newcastle Knights	24	5	0	19	2	428	648	−220	14

=== Result by round ===
Round	1	2	3	4	5	6	7	8	9	10	11	12	13	14	15	16	17	18	19	20	21	22	23	24	25	26
Ground	A	A	A	H	A	A	H	H	A	A	H	A	H	H	H	–	H	A	–	A	H	A	H	H	A	H
Result	W	W	L	L	L	L	W	W	W	L	L	W	W	L	W	B	W	W	B	W	W	W	L	W	W	W
Position	4	1	4	9	10	13	10	10	7	9	10	9	8	9	9	8	8	8	7	7	6	5	5	5	4	4

Updated to match(es) played on 3 September 2017. Source: National Rugby League
A = Away; H = Home; B = Bye; W = Win; D = Draw; L = Loss

=== Matches ===
Round	Home	Score	Away	Match Information
Round	Home	Score	Away	Date and time (Local)	Venue	Attendance
1	Manly-Warringah Sea Eagles	12 – 20	Parramatta Eels	Sunday, 5 March, 4:00 PM	Lottoland	11,318
2	St. George Illawarra Dragons	16 – 34	Parramatta Eels	Sunday, 12 March, 6:30 PM	WIN Stadium	16,023
3	Gold Coast Titans	26 – 14	Parramatta Eels	Friday, 17 March, 8:05 PM	Cbus Super Stadium	11,612
4	Parramatta Eels	6 – 20	Cronulla-Sutherland Sharks	Saturday, 25 March, 7:00 PM	ANZ Stadium	17,003
5	Canberra Raiders	30 – 18	Parramatta Eels	Saturday, 1 April, 5:30 PM	GIO Stadium	17,653
6	New Zealand Warriors	22 – 10	Parramatta Eels	Sunday, 9 April, 1:30 PM	Mt Smart Stadium	13,526
7	Parramatta Eels	26 – 22	Wests Tigers	Monday, 17 April, 3:30 PM	ANZ Stadium	28,249
8	Parramatta Eels	18 – 12	Penrith Panthers	Saturday, 22 April, 3:00 PM	ANZ Stadium	14,070
9	North Queensland Cowboys	6 – 26	Parramatta Eels	Friday, 28 April, 8:05 PM	1300SMILES Stadium	10,594
10	Sydney Roosters	48 – 10	Parramatta Eels	Sunday, 14 May, 3:00 PM	Allianz Stadium	10,467
11	Parramatta Eels	16 – 22	Canberra Raiders	Saturday, 20 May, 7:30 PM	ANZ Stadium	10,074
12	South Sydney Rabbitohs	16 – 22	Parramatta Eels	Friday, 26 May, 7:50 PM	ANZ Stadium	14,218
13	Parramatta Eels	32 – 24	New Zealand Warriors	Friday, 2 June, 7:50 PM	ANZ Stadium	9,489
14	Parramatta Eels	6 – 32	North Queensland Cowboys	Saturday, 10 June, 7:30 PM	TIO Stadium	11,968
15	Parramatta Eels	24 – 10	St George-Illawarra Dragons	Sunday, 18 June, 4:00 PM	ANZ Stadium	13,559
Bye Round
17	Parramatta Eels	13 – 12 (gp)	Canterbury-Bankstown Bulldogs	Thursday, 29 June, 7:50 PM	ANZ Stadium	14,061
18	Melbourne Storm	6 – 22	Parramatta Eels	Saturday, 8 July, 7:30 PM	AAMI Park	13,593
Bye Round
20	Wests Tigers	16 – 17	Parramatta Eels	Sunday, 23 July, 4:00 PM	ANZ Stadium	30,901
21	Parramatta Eels	28 – 14	Brisbane Broncos	Friday, 28 July, 7:50 PM	ANZ Stadium	12,182
22	Canterbury-Bankstown Bulldogs	4 – 20	Parramatta Eels	Thursday, 3 August, 7:50 PM	ANZ Stadium	12,137
23	Parramatta Eels	10 – 29	Newcastle Knights	Friday, 11 August, 6:00 PM	ANZ Stadium	13,141
24	Parramatta Eels	30 – 8	Gold Coast Titans	Thursday, 17 August, 7:50 PM	ANZ Stadium	6,826
25	Brisbane Broncos	34 – 52	Parramatta Eels	Thursday, 24 August, 7:50 PM	Suncorp Stadium	29,058
26	Parramatta Eels	22 – 16	South Sydney Rabbitohs	Friday, 1 September, 7:50 PM	ANZ Stadium	21,533

== Finals series ==
=== Bracket ===
Qualifying and elimination finals
9 September – Melbourne
1	Melbourne Storm	18
4	Parramatta Eels	16
10 September – Sydney
5	Cronulla-Sutherland Sharks	14
8	North Queensland Cowboys	15
9 September – Sydney
6	Manly-Warringah Sea Eagles	10
7	Penrith Panthers	22
8 September – Sydney
2	Sydney Roosters	24
3	Brisbane Broncos	22

Semi-finals
16 September – Sydney
Parramatta Eels	16
North Queensland Cowboys	24
15 September – Brisbane
Brisbane Broncos	13
Penrith Panthers	6

Preliminary finals
22 September – Melbourne
Melbourne Storm	30
Brisbane Broncos	0
23 September – Sydney
Sydney Roosters	16
North Queensland Cowboys	29

Grand final
1 October – Sydney
Melbourne Storm	34
North Queensland Cowboys	6

=== Matches ===
Final	Home	Score	Away	Match Information
Final	Home	Score	Away	Date and time (Local)	Venue	Attendance
QF1	Melbourne Storm	18 – 16	Parramatta Eels	Saturday, 9 September, 4:10 PM	AAMI Park	22,626
SF1	Parramatta Eels	16 – 24	North Queensland Cowboys	Saturday, 16 September, 7:40 PM	ANZ Stadium	41,287

== Representative call-ups ==
=== Domestic ===
Player	Team	Call-up	Date	Ref.
Bevan French	Indigenous All Stars	2017 All Stars Match	February 2017
Tepai Moeroa	World All Stars	2017 All Stars Match	February 2017
Clinton Gutherson	NSW City	2017 City vs Country Origin	May 2017
David Gower	NSW City	2017 City vs Country Origin	May 2017
Daniel Alvaro	NSW Country	2017 City vs Country Origin	May 2017

=== International ===
Player	Country	Call-up	Date	Ref.
Marata Niukore	Cook Islands	2017 Pacific Rugby League Tests	May 2017
Suaia Matagi	Samoa	2017 Pacific Rugby League Tests	May 2017
Suaia Matagi	Samoa	2017 Rugby League World Cup	October 2017
Kaysa Pritchard	Samoa	2017 Pacific Rugby League Tests	May 2017
Siosaia Vave	Tonga	2017 Pacific Rugby League Tests	May 2017
Michael Jennings	Tonga	2017 Rugby League World Cup	October 2017
Manu Ma'u	Tonga	2017 Rugby League World Cup	October 2017
Peni Terepo	Tonga	2017 Rugby League World Cup	October 2017
Brad Takairangi	New Zealand	2017 Rugby League World Cup	October 2017
Daniel Alvaro	Italy	2017 Rugby League World Cup	October 2017
Nathan Brown	Italy	2017 Rugby League World Cup	October 2017
Frank Pritchard	Samoa	2017 Rugby League World Cup	October 2017
Salesi Fainga'a (NYC player)	Fiji	2017 Rugby League World Cup	October 2017
Anthony Layoun (NYC player)	Lebanon	2017 Rugby League World Cup	October 2017
Tim Mannah	Lebanon	2017 Rugby League World Cup	October 2017
Mitchell Moses	Lebanon	2017 Rugby League World Cup	October 2017
