= 2017 Canterbury-Bankstown Bulldogs season =

Canterbury-Bankstown Bulldogs
- 2017 season
- CEO: Raelene Castle
- Head coach: Des Hasler
- Captain: James Graham
- Top try scorer: Club: Marcelo Montoya (12)
- Top points scorer: Club: Kerrod Holland (80)
- Highest home attendance: 35,984
- Lowest home attendance: 7,421
- Average home attendance: 14,040

The 2017 Canterbury-Bankstown Bulldogs season is the 83rd in the club's history. Coached by Des Hasler and captained by James Graham, they competed in the National Rugby League's 2017 Telstra Premiership after finishing the 2016 season in 7th place.

== Fixtures ==
=== Regular season ===
Round	Home	Score	Away	Match Information
Round	Home	Score	Away	Date and Time	Venue	Crowd
1	Canterbury Bankstown Bulldogs	6-12	Melbourne Storm	Fri 3 Mar, 6:00pm AEDT	Belmore Sports Ground	8,712
2	Sydney Roosters	28-24	Canterbury Bankstown Bulldogs	Thu 9 Mar, 8:05pm AEDT	Allianz Stadium	13,505
3	Canterbury Bankstown Bulldogs	24-12	New Zealand Warriors	Fri 17 Mar, 8:0pm NZST	Forsyth Barr Stadium	10,238
4	Manly-Warringah Sea Eagles	36-0	Canterbury Bankstown Bulldogs	Sat 25 Mar, 4:30pm AEDT	Lottoland Stadium	9,610
5	Canterbury Bankstown Bulldogs	10-7	Brisbane Broncos	Thu 30 Mar, 8:05pm AEDT	ANZ Stadium	7,421
6	Newcastle Knights	12-22	Canterbury Bankstown Bulldogs	Fri 7 Apr, 6:00pm AEST	McDonald Jones Stadium	16,929
7	Canterbury Bankstown Bulldogs	24-9	South Sydney Rabbitohs	Fri 14 Apr, 4:00pm AEST	ANZ Stadium	35,984
8	Wests Tigers	18-12	Canterbury Bankstown Bulldogs	Sun 23 Apr, 4:00pm AEST	ANZ Stadium	19,303
9	Canterbury Bankstown Bulldogs	16-10	Canberra Raiders	Sat 29 Apr, 5:30pm AEST	ANZ Stadium	13,390
10	Canterbury Bankstown Bulldogs	14-30	North Queensland Cowboys	Thu 11 May, 7:50pm AEST	ANZ Stadium	8,122
11	Canterbury Bankstown Bulldogs	18-24	Sydney Roosters	Sun 21 May, 4:00pm AEST	ANZ Stadium	15,090
12	Cronulla Sharks	9-8	Canterbury Bankstown Bulldogs	Sat 27 May, 7:30pm AEST	Southern Cross Group Stadium	20,497
13	Canterbury Bankstown Bulldogs	0-38	Penrith Panthers	Sun 4 Jun, 7:00pm AEST	ANZ Stadium	11,283
14	Canterbury Bankstown Bulldogs	16-2	St. George Illawarra Dragons	Mon 12 Jun, 4:00pm AEST	ANZ Stadium	24,083
15		BYE
16	New Zealand Warriors	21-14	Canterbury Bankstown Bulldogs	Fri 23 Jun, 7:30pm NZST	Mt Smart Stadium	13,476
17	Parramatta Eels	13-12	Canterbury Bankstown Bulldogs	Thu 29 Jun, 7:50pm AEST	ANZ Stadium	14,061
18	Canterbury Bankstown Bulldogs	20-18	Newcastle Knights	Sun 9 Jul, 7:30pm AEST	Belmore Sports Ground	13,103
19		BYE
20	Brisbane Broncos	42-12	Canterbury Bankstown Bulldogs	Thu 20 Jul, 7:50pm AEST	Suncorp Stadium	24,267
21	Penrith Panthers	16-8	Canterbury Bankstown Bulldogs	Thu 27 Jul, 7:50pm AEST	Pepper Stadium	8,727
22	Canterbury Bankstown Bulldogs	4-20	Parramatta Eels	Thu 3 Aug, 7:50pm AEST	ANZ Stadium	12,137
23	South Sydney Rabbitohs	28-14	Canterbury Bankstown Bulldogs	Thu 10 Aug, 7:50pm AEST	ANZ Stadium	8,247
24	Canterbury Bankstown Bulldogs	30-16	Manly-Warringah Sea Eagles	Sun 20 Aug, 4:00pm AEST	ANZ Stadium	8,912
25	Gold Coast Titans	14-26	Canterbury Bankstown Bulldogs	Sat 26 Aug, 3:00pm AEST	Cbus Super Stadium	10,887
26	St. George Illawarra Dragons	20-26	Canterbury-Bankstown Bulldogs	Sun 3 Sep, 4:00pm AEST	ANZ Stadium	21,582
Legend: Win Loss Draw Bye

== Ladder ==
2017 NRL season
Pos	Team	Pld	W	D	L	B	PF	PA	PD	Pts
1	Melbourne Storm (P)	24	20	0	4	2	633	336	+297	44
2	Sydney Roosters	24	17	0	7	2	500	428	+72	38
3	Brisbane Broncos	24	16	0	8	2	597	433	+164	36
4	Parramatta Eels	24	16	0	8	2	496	457	+39	36
5	Cronulla-Sutherland Sharks	24	15	0	9	2	476	407	+69	34
6	Manly-Warringah Sea Eagles	24	14	0	10	2	552	512	+40	32
7	Penrith Panthers	24	13	0	11	2	504	459	+45	30
8	North Queensland Cowboys	24	13	0	11	2	467	443	+24	30
9	St. George Illawarra Dragons	24	12	0	12	2	533	450	+83	28
10	Canberra Raiders	24	11	0	13	2	558	497	+61	26
11	Canterbury-Bankstown Bulldogs	24	10	0	14	2	360	455	−95	24
12	South Sydney Rabbitohs	24	9	0	15	2	464	564	−100	22
13	New Zealand Warriors	24	7	0	17	2	444	575	−131	18
14	Wests Tigers	24	7	0	17	2	413	571	−158	18
15	Gold Coast Titans	24	7	0	17	2	448	638	−190	18
16	Newcastle Knights	24	5	0	19	2	428	648	−220	14

== Squad ==
Canterbury Bulldogs 2017 Squad
First team squad		Coaching staff
Brad Abbey – FB; Greg Eastwood – LK, SR, PR; Adam Elliott – SR; Raymond Faitala-Mariner – SR, LK; Asipeli Fine – CE, SR, WG; Craig Garvey – HK; James Graham (c) – PR; William Hopoate – CE, WG, FB; Josh Jackson – SR, LK; Sam Kasiano – PR, LK; Richard Kennar – CE, WG; David Klemmer – PR	Brenko Lee – CE, WG; Michael Lichaa – HK; Rhyse Martin – SR; Moses Mbye – HB; Brett Morris – WG, FB; Josh Morris – CE; Tyrone Phillips – WG, CE, FB; Josh Reynolds – FE; Chase Stanley – CE, WG; Aiden Tolman (vc) – PR	Head coach: Des Hasler; Assistant coaches: Jim Dymock (assistant coach); David Penna (assistant coach); Medical professionals: Donny Singe (director of athletic performance); Tony Grimaldi (head conditioner); Rubin Ruzicka (strength and power coach); Larry Britton (head trainer); Tony Ayoub (physiotherapist); Dr Joe Lombardo (club doctor); Garry Carden (assistant strength & conditioning coach); Steve McCullagh (assistant physiotherapist); Dr Hugh Hazzard (medical consultant); Managers: Fred Ciraldo (team manager); Andy Patmore (pathways performance manager); Steve Georgallis (NSW Cup coach); Legend: (c) Captain(s); (vc) Vice-captain(s); Injured; Updated: 15 December 2016; Source(s): Bulldogs Squad 2016

== See also ==
- List of Canterbury-Bankstown Bulldogs seasons
