= 2016 NRL season results =

2016 National Rugby League
- Teams: 16
- Premiers: Cronulla-Sutherland Sharks (1st title)
- Minor premiers: Melbourne Storm (2nd title)
- Matches played: 189
- Points scored: 7874
- Attendance: 2877018
- Top try-scorer: Suliasi Vunivalu (22)

The 2016 NRL season consists of 26 weekly regular season rounds starting on Thursday 3 March, and concluded on Sunday 2 October with the grand final.

== Round 1 ==
Home	Score	Away	Match information
Home	Score	Away	Date and time (Local)	Venue (Broadcaster)	Referees	Attendance Capacity
Parramatta Eels	4-17	Brisbane Broncos	3 Mar 2016, 8:05 pm	Pirtek Stadium (Nine Network)	Matt Cecchin/Alan Shortall	17,324 / 20,741
Manly-Warringah Sea Eagles	6-28	Canterbury-Bankstown Bulldogs	4 Mar 2016, 8:05 pm	Brookvale Oval (Nine Network)	Gerard Sutton/Matt Noyen	16,512 / 23,000
Canberra Raiders	30-22	Penrith Panthers	5 Mar 2016, 3:00 pm	GIO Stadium (Fox Sports)	Gavin Badger/Dave Munro	11,297 / 25,011
Wests Tigers	34-26	New Zealand Warriors	5 Mar 2016, 5:30 pm	Campbelltown Stadium (Fox Sports)	Ashley Klein/Chris Sutton	10,917 / 20,000
North Queensland Cowboys	20-14	Cronulla-Sutherland Sharks	5 Mar 2016, 7:30 pm	1300SMILES Stadium (Fox Sports)	Ben Cummins/Adam Devcich	15,519 / 26,500
Sydney Roosters	10-42	South Sydney Rabbitohs	6 Mar 2016, 4:00 pm	Allianz Stadium (Nine Network)	Jared Maxwell/Adam Gee	25,125 / 45,500
Gold Coast Titans	30-12	Newcastle Knights	6 Mar 2016, 6:30 pm	Cbus Super Stadium (Fox Sports)	Henry Perenara/Chris James	8,313 / 27,400
Melbourne Storm	18-16	St. George Illawarra Dragons	7 Mar 2016, 7:00 pm	AAMI Park (Fox Sports)	Grant Atkins/Gavin Reynolds	12,148 / 30,050

== Round 2 ==
Home	Score	Away	Match information
Home	Score	Away	Date and time (Local)	Venue (Broadcaster)	Referees	Attendance Capacity
Penrith Panthers	16-18	Canterbury-Bankstown Bulldogs	10 Mar 2016, 8:05 pm	Pepper Stadium (Nine Network)	Ben Cummins/Adam Devcich	11,125 / 22,500
Brisbane Broncos	25-10	New Zealand Warriors	11 Mar 2016, 8:05 pm	Suncorp Stadium (Nine Network)	Gerard Sutton/Matt Noyen	35,230 / 52,500
Canberra Raiders	21-20	Sydney Roosters	12 Mar 2016, 3:00 pm	GIO Stadium (Fox Sports)	Grant Atkins/Gavin Reynolds	12,423 / 25,011
South Sydney Rabbitohs	48-6	Newcastle Knights	12 Mar 2016, 5:30 pm	ANZ Stadium (Fox Sports)	Gavin Badger/Dave Munro	13,364 / 83,500
Parramatta Eels	20-16	North Queensland Cowboys	12 Mar 2016, 7:30 pm	Pirtek Stadium (Fox Sports)	Jared Maxwell/Adam Gee	12,194 / 20,741
Cronulla-Sutherland Sharks	30-2	St. George Illawarra Dragons	13 Mar 2016, 4:00 pm	Shark Park (Nine Network)	Matt Cecchin/Alan Shortall	17,946 / 22,000
Melbourne Storm	34-16	Gold Coast Titans	13 Mar 2016, 6:30 pm	AAMI Park (Fox Sports)	Ashley Klein/ Chris Sutton	12,637 / 30,050
Wests Tigers	36-22	Manly-Warringah Sea Eagles	14 Mar 2016, 7:00 pm	Leichhardt Oval (Fox Sports)	Henry Perenara/Chris James	11,269 / 20,000

== Round 3 ==
Home	Score	Away	Match information
Home	Score	Away	Date and time (Local)	Venue (Broadcaster)	Referees	Attendance Capacity
North Queensland Cowboys	40-0	Sydney Roosters	17 Mar 2016, 8:05 pm	1300SMILES Stadium (Nine Network)		8,099 / 26,500
Canterbury-Bankstown Bulldogs	6-20	Parramatta Eels	18 Mar 2016, 8:05 pm	ANZ Stadium (Nine Network)		30,018 / 83,500
Newcastle Knights	24-24 (gp)	Canberra Raiders	19 Mar 2016, 5:30 pm	Hunter Stadium (Fox Sports)		13,745 / 33,000
Penrith Panthers	23-22	Brisbane Broncos	19 Mar 2016, 7:30 pm	Pepper Stadium (Fox Sports)		12,086 / 22,500
Gold Coast Titans	30-18	Wests Tigers	19 Mar 2016, 9:30 pm	Cbus Super Stadium (Fox Sports)		9,975 / 27,400
New Zealand Warriors	14-21	Melbourne Storm	20 Mar 2016, 2:00 pm	Mt Smart Stadium (Fox Sports)		16,214 / 30,000
St. George Illawarra Dragons	8-6	South Sydney Rabbitohs	20 Mar 2016, 4:00 pm	SCG (Nine Network)		17,824 / 48,000
Manly-Warringah Sea Eagles	22-12	Cronulla-Sutherland Sharks	21 Mar 2016, 7:00 pm	Brookvale Oval (Fox Sports)		5,122 / 23,000

== Round 4 ==
Home	Score	Away	Match information
Home	Score	Away	Date and time (Local)	Venue (Broadcaster)	Referees	Attendance Capacity
South Sydney Rabbitohs	12-42	Canterbury-Bankstown Bulldogs	25 Mar 2016, 4:00 pm	ANZ Stadium (Nine Network)		38,192 / 83,500
Brisbane Broncos	21-20 (gp)	North Queensland Cowboys	25 Mar 2016, 8:05 pm	Suncorp Stadium (Nine Network)		46,176 / 52,500
Canberra Raiders	20-24	Gold Coast Titans	26 Mar 2016, 5:30 pm	GIO Stadium (Fox Sports)		11,039 / 25,011
Sydney Roosters	20-22	Manly-Warringah Sea Eagles	26 Mar 2016, 7:30 pm	Allianz Stadium (Fox Sports)		12,271 / 45,500
St. George Illawarra Dragons	14-12	Penrith Panthers	27 Mar 2016, 4:00 pm	WIN Stadium (Nine Network)		12,983 / 23,000
New Zealand Warriors	40-18	Newcastle Knights	28 Mar 2016, 2:00 pm	Mt Smart Stadium (Fox Sports)		13,895 / 30,000
Wests Tigers	0-8	Parramatta Eels	28 Mar 2016, 4:00 pm	ANZ Stadium (Fox Sports)		36,112 / 83,500
Cronulla-Sutherland Sharks	14-6	Melbourne Storm	28 Mar 2016, 7:00 pm	Shark Park (Fox Sports)		9,155 / 22,000

== Round 5 ==
Home	Score	Away	Match information
Home	Score	Away	Date and time (Local)	Venue (Broadcaster)	Referees	Attendance Capacity
Manly-Warringah Sea Eagles	12-16	South Sydney Rabbitohs	31 Mar 2016, 8:05 pm	Brookvale Oval (Nine Network)		9,603 / 23,000
Gold Coast Titans	16-24	Brisbane Broncos	1 Apr 2016, 8:05 pm	Cbus Super Stadium (Nine Network)		21,080 / 27,400
Melbourne Storm	18-14	Newcastle Knights	2 Apr 2016, 3:00 pm	AAMI Park (Fox Sports)		11,443 / 30,050
Wests Tigers	26-34	Cronulla-Sutherland Sharks	2 Apr 2016, 5:30 pm	Campbelltown Stadium (Fox Sports)		12,831 / 20,000
North Queensland Cowboys	36-0	St. George Illawarra Dragons	2 Apr 2016, 7:30 pm	1300SMILES Stadium (Fox Sports)		17,444 / 26,500
Sydney Roosters	28-32 (gp)	New Zealand Warriors	3 Apr 2016, 2:00 pm	Central Coast Stadium (Fox Sports)		10,113 / 20,059
Parramatta Eels	18-20	Penrith Panthers	3 Apr 2016, 4:00 pm	Pirtek Stadium (Nine Network)		15,600 /20,741
Canterbury-Bankstown Bulldogs	8-22	Canberra Raiders	4 Apr 2016, 7:00 pm	Belmore Sports Ground (Fox Sports)		13,463 / 19,000

== Round 6 ==
Home	Score	Away	Match information
Home	Score	Away	Date and time (Local)	Venue (Broadcaster)	Referees	Attendance Capacity
Brisbane Broncos	26-0	St. George Illawarra Dragons	7 Apr 2016, 7:50 pm	Suncorp Stadium (Nine Network)		29,869 / 52,500
South Sydney Rabbitohs	10-17	Sydney Roosters	8 Apr 2016, 7:50 pm	ANZ Stadium (Nine Network)		18,161 / 83,500
Parramatta Eels	36-6	Canberra Raiders	9 Apr 2016, 3:00 pm	Pirtek Stadium (Fox Sports)		12,947 / 20,741
New Zealand Warriors	18-34	Manly-Warringah Sea Eagles	9 Apr 2016, 5:30 pm	Mt Smart Stadium (Fox Sports)		16,112 / 30,000
Penrith Panthers	18-23	North Queensland Cowboys	9 Apr 2016, 7:30 pm	Pepper Stadium (Fox Sports)		13,725 / 22,500
Cronulla-Sutherland Sharks	25-20	Gold Coast Titans	10 Apr 2016, 2:00 pm	Shark Park (Fox Sports)		11,753 / 22,000
Newcastle Knights	18-16	Wests Tigers	10 Apr 2016, 4:00 pm	Hunter Stadium (Nine Network)		21,653 / 33,000
Melbourne Storm	12-18	Canterbury-Bankstown Bulldogs	11 Apr 2016, 7:00 pm	AAMI Park (Fox Sports)		11,037 / 30,050

== Round 7 ==
Home	Score	Away	Match information
Home	Score	Away	Date and time (Local)	Venue (Broadcaster)	Referees	Attendance Capacity
Manly-Warringah Sea Eagles	10-22	Parramatta Eels	14 Apr 2016, 7:50 pm	Brookvale Oval (Nine Network)		14,633 / 23,000
North Queensland Cowboys	44-18	South Sydney Rabbitohs	15 Apr 2016, 7:50 pm	1300SMILES Stadium (Nine Network)		15,487 / 26,500
Gold Coast Titans	14-19	St. George Illawarra Dragons	16 Apr 2016, 3:00 pm	Cbus Super Stadium (Fox Sports)		12,215 / 27,400
Canterbury-Bankstown Bulldogs	20-24	New Zealand Warriors	16 Apr 2016, 5:30 pm	Westpac Stadium (Fox Sports)		18,212 / 34,500
Brisbane Broncos	53-0	Newcastle Knights	16 Apr 2016, 7:30 pm	Suncorp Stadium (Fox Sports)		30,394 / 52,500
Canberra Raiders	16-40	Cronulla-Sutherland Sharks	17 Apr 2016, 2:00 pm	GIO Stadium (Fox Sports)		12,890 / 25,011
Wests Tigers	18-19 (gp)	Melbourne Storm	17 Apr 2016, 4:00 pm	Leichhardt Oval (Nine Network)		9,216 / 20,000
Sydney Roosters	16-20	Penrith Panthers	18 Apr 2016, 7:00 pm	Allianz Stadium (Fox Sports)		10,117 / 45,500

== Round 8 (Anzac Round) ==
Home	Score	Away	Match information
Home	Score	Away	Date and time (Local)	Venue (Broadcaster)	Referees	Attendance Capacity
Brisbane Broncos	30-8	South Sydney Rabbitohs	22 Apr 2016, 7:50 pm	Suncorp Stadium (Nine Network)		40,275 / 52,500
Canterbury-Bankstown Bulldogs	21-20	Gold Coast Titans	23 Apr 2016, 3:00 pm	ANZ Stadium (Fox Sports)		11,450 / 83,500
Canberra Raiders	60-6	Wests Tigers	23 Apr 2016, 5:30 pm	GIO Stadium (Fox Sports)		13,420 / 25,011
North Queensland Cowboys	32-16	Parramatta Eels	23 Apr 2016, 7:30 pm	1300SMILES Stadium (Fox Sports)		19,308 / 26,500
Cronulla-Sutherland Sharks	20-18	Penrith Panthers	24 Apr 2016, 4:00 pm	Shark Park (Nine Network)		14,273 / 22,000
Newcastle Knights	10-26	Manly-Warringah Sea Eagles	25 Apr 2016, 2:00 pm	Hunter Stadium (Fox Sports)		19,072 / 33,000
St. George Illawarra Dragons	20-18	Sydney Roosters	25 Apr 2016, 4:00 pm	Allianz Stadium (Nine Network)		34,483 / 45,500
Melbourne Storm	42-0	New Zealand Warriors	25 Apr 2016, 7:00 pm	AAMI Park (Fox Sports)		21,233 / 30,050

== Round 9 ==
Home	Score	Away	Match information
Home	Score	Away	Date and time (Local)	Venue (Broadcaster)	Referees	Attendance Capacity
South Sydney Rabbitohs	22-30	Wests Tigers	28 Apr 2016, 7:50 pm	ANZ Stadium (Nine Network)		11,229 / 83,500
Parramatta Eels	20-12	Canterbury-Bankstown Bulldogs	29 Apr 2016, 7:50 pm	ANZ Stadium (Nine Network)		31,815 / 83,500
Penrith Panthers	19-18	Canberra Raiders	30 Apr 2016, 3:00 pm	Carrington Park (Fox Sports)		6,721 / 13,000
Sydney Roosters	38-0	Newcastle Knights	30 Apr 2016, 5:30 pm	Allianz Stadium (Fox Sports)		9,502 / 45,500
Manly-Warringah Sea Eagles	6-22	North Queensland Cowboys	30 Apr 2016, 7:30 pm	Brookvale Oval (Fox Sports)		11,734 / 23,000
New Zealand Warriors	26-10	St. George Illawarra Dragons	1 May 2016, noon	Mt Smart Stadium (Fox Sports)		12,752 / 30,000
Gold Coast Titans	0-38	Melbourne Storm	1 May 2016, 2:00 pm	Cbus Super Stadium (Fox Sports)		10,214 / 27,400
Cronulla-Sutherland Sharks	30-28	Brisbane Broncos	1 May 2016, 4:00 pm	Shark Park (Nine Network)		14,406 / 22,000

== Round 10 ==
Home	Score	Away	Match information
Home	Score	Away	Date and time (Local)	Venue (Broadcaster)	Referees	Attendance Capacity
St. George Illawarra Dragons	16-12 (gp)	Canberra Raiders	12 May 2016, 7:50 pm	Jubilee Oval (Nine Network)		9,647 / 20,500
Parramatta Eels	20-22	South Sydney Rabbitohs	13 May 2016, 7:50 pm	Pirtek Stadium (Nine Network)		16,013 / 20,741
Penrith Panthers	30-18	New Zealand Warriors	14 May 2016, 3:00 pm	AMI Stadium (Fox Sports)		18,000 / 18,000
Melbourne Storm	15-14	North Queensland Cowboys	14 May 2016, 5:30 pm	Suncorp Stadium (Fox Sports)		52,347 / 52,500
Manly-Warringah Sea Eagles	6-30	Brisbane Broncos	14 May 2016, 7:30 pm	Suncorp Stadium (Fox Sports)		52,347 / 52,500
Newcastle Knights	0-62	Cronulla-Sutherland Sharks	15 May 2016, 2:00 pm	Hunter Stadium (Fox Sports)		16,150 / 33,000
Wests Tigers	4-36	Canterbury-Bankstown Bulldogs	15 May 2016, 4:00 pm	ANZ Stadium (Nine Network)		20,936 / 83,500
Gold Coast Titans	26-6	Sydney Roosters	16 May 2016, 7:00 pm	Cbus Super Stadium (Fox Sports)		9,363 / 27,400

== Round 11 ==
Home	Score	Away	Match information
Home	Score	Away	Date and time (Local)	Venue (Broadcaster)	Referees	Attendance Capacity
South Sydney Rabbitohs	34-24	St. George Illawarra Dragons	19 May 2016, 7:50 pm	ANZ Stadium (Nine Network)		12,054 / 83,500
North Queensland Cowboys	19-18	Brisbane Broncos	20 May 2016, 7:50 pm	1300SMILES Stadium (Nine Network)		25,163 / 26,500
Wests Tigers	20-12	Newcastle Knights	21 May 2016, 3:00 pm	Campbelltown Stadium (Fox Sports)		8,658 / 20,000
New Zealand Warriors	12-38	Canberra Raiders	21 May 2016, 5:30 pm	Yarrow Stadium (Fox Sports)		12,833 / 25,000
Cronulla-Sutherland Sharks	20-12	Manly-Warringah Sea Eagles	21 May 2016, 7:30 pm	Southern Cross Group Stadium (Fox Sports)		16,601 / 22,000
Penrith Panthers	24-28	Gold Coast Titans	22 May 2016, 2:00 pm	Pepper Stadium (Fox Sports)		11,210 / 22,500
Canterbury-Bankstown Bulldogs	32-20	Sydney Roosters	22 May 2016, 4:00 pm	ANZ Stadium (Nine Network)		17,704 / 83,500
Parramatta Eels	6-18	Melbourne Storm	23 May 2016, 7:00 pm	Pirtek Stadium (Fox Sports)		8,941 / 20,741

== Round 12 ==
Home	Score	porn	Match information
Home	Score	porn	Date and time (Local)	Venue (Broadcaster)	Referees	Attendance Capacity
Brisbane Broncos	18-19	Wests Tigers	27 May 2016, 7:50 pm	Suncorp Stadium (Nine Network)	Matt Cecchin/Gavin Badger	27,153 / 52,500
St. George Illawarra Dragons	14-10	North Queensland Cowboys	28 May 2016, 7:30 pm	WIN Stadium (Fox Sports)	Grant Atkins/Alan Shortall	10,032 / 23,000
Canberra Raiders	32-20	Canterbury-Bankstown Bulldogs	29 May 2016, 4:00 pm	GIO Stadium (Nine Network)	Ashley Klein/Adam Gee	13,907 / 25,011
Newcastle Knights	18-20	Parramatta Eels	30 May 2016, 7:00 pm	Hunter Stadium (Fox Sports)	Henry Perenara/Gavin Reynolds	12,856 / 33,000
Bye: New Zealand Warriors, Cronulla-Sutherland Sharks, Melbourne Storm, Penrith Panthers, South Sydney Rabbitohs, Gold Coast Titans, Manly-Warringah Sea Eagles & Sydney Roosters.

== Round 13 ==
Home	Score	Away	Match information
Home	Score	Away	Date and time (Local)	Venue (Broadcaster)	Referees	Attendance Capacity
Canberra Raiders	30-18	Manly-Warringah Sea Eagles	3 Jun 2016, 7:50 pm	GIO Stadium (Nine Network)		9,157 / 25,011
New Zealand Warriors	36-18	Brisbane Broncos	4 Jun 2016, 3:00 pm	Mt Smart Stadium (Fox Sports)		15,097 / 30,000
North Queensland Cowboys	46-16	Newcastle Knights	4 Jun 2016, 5:30 pm	1300SMILES Stadium (Fox Sports)		14,651 / 26,500
Melbourne Storm	24-6	Penrith Panthers	4 Jun 2016, 7:30 pm	AAMI Park (Fox Sports)		11,116 / 30,050
Sydney Roosters	32-18	Wests Tigers	5 Jun 2016, 4:00 pm	Allianz Stadium (Nine Network)		3,622 / 45,500
South Sydney Rabbitohs	28-29	Gold Coast Titans	5 Jun 2016, 6:30 pm	nib Stadium (Fox Sports)		13,142 / 20,500
Canterbury-Bankstown Bulldogs	18-20	Cronulla-Sutherland Sharks	6 Jun 2016, 7:00 pm	ANZ Stadium (Fox Sports)		10,081 / 83,500
Bye: Parramatta Eels & St. George Illawarra Dragons.

== Round 14 ==
Home	Score	Away	Match information
Home	Score	Away	Date and time (Local)	Venue (Broadcaster)	Referees	Attendance Capacity
Brisbane Broncos	26-18	Canberra Raiders	9 Jun 2016, 7:50 pm	Suncorp Stadium (Nine Network)		25,021 / 52,500
Wests Tigers	30-14	South Sydney Rabbitohs	10 Jun 2016, 7:50 pm	ANZ Stadium (Nine Network)		14,490 / 83,500
Newcastle Knights	14-50	New Zealand Warriors	11 Jun 2016, 3:00 pm	Hunter Stadium (Fox Sports)		12,222 / 23,000
Parramatta Eels	22-12	Gold Coast Titans	11 Jun 2016, 5:30 pm	TIO Stadium (Fox Sports)		7,722 / 14,000
Sydney Roosters	0-46	Melbourne Storm	11 Jun 2016, 7:30 pm	Allianz Stadium (Fox Sports)		8,499 / 45,500
Manly-Warringah Sea Eagles	24-31	Penrith Panthers	12 Jun 2016, 4:00 pm	Brookvale Oval (Nine Network)		12,463 / 23,000
St. George Illawarra Dragons	16-34	Canterbury-Bankstown Bulldogs	13 Jun 2016, 4:00 pm	ANZ Stadium (Fox Sports)		20,153 / 83,500
Cronulla-Sutherland Sharks	13-10	North Queensland Cowboys	13 Jun 2016, 7:00 pm	Southern Cross Group Stadium (Fox Sports)		13,119 / 22,000

== Round 15 ==
Home	Score	Away	Match information
Home	Score	Away	Date and time (Local)	Venue (Broadcaster)	Referees	Attendance Capacity
South Sydney Rabbitohs	12-30	Parramatta Eels	17 Jun 2016, 7:50 pm	ANZ Stadium (Nine Network)		11,860 / 83,500
St. George Illawarra Dragons	20-10	Melbourne Storm	18 Jun 2016, 7:30 pm	WIN Stadium (Fox Sports)		7,568 / 23,000
New Zealand Warriors	12-10	Sydney Roosters	19 Jun 2016, 4:00 pm	Mt Smart Stadium (Nine Network)		14,026 / 30,000
Gold Coast Titans	30-10	Manly-Warringah Sea Eagles	20 Jun 2016, 7:00 pm	Cbus Super Stadium (Fox Sports)		8,278 / 27,400
Bye: Newcastle Knights, Wests Tigers, Penrith Panthers, Canterbury-Bankstown Bulldogs, Canberra Raiders, Brisbane Broncos, North Queensland Cowboys & Cronulla-Sutherland Sharks.

== Round 16 ==
Home	Score	Away	Match information
Home	Score	Away	Date and time (Local)	Venue (Broadcaster)	Referees	Attendance Capacity
Penrith Panthers	28-26	South Sydney Rabbitohs	24 Jun 2016, 7:50 pm	Pepper Stadium (Nine Network)		13,080 / 22,500
Newcastle Knights	18-30	St. George Illawarra Dragons	25 Jun 2016, 3:00 pm	Hunter Stadium (Fox Sports)		13,777 / 33,000
Cronulla-Sutherland Sharks	19-18	New Zealand Warriors	25 Jun 2016, 5:30 pm	Southern Cross Group Stadium (Fox Sports)		12,074 / 22,000
Canterbury-Bankstown Bulldogs	40-14	Brisbane Broncos	25 Jun 2016, 7:30 pm	ANZ Stadium (Fox Sports)		15,106 / 83,500
Gold Coast Titans	22-30	Canberra Raiders	26 Jun 2016, 2:00 pm	Cbus Super Stadium (Fox Sports)		12,645 / 27,400
Melbourne Storm	29-20	Wests Tigers	26 Jun 2016, 4:00 pm	AAMI Park (Nine Network)		14,412 / 30,050
North Queensland Cowboys	30-26	Manly-Warringah Sea Eagles	27 Jun 2016, 7:00 pm	1300SMILES Stadium (Fox Sports)		15,584 / 26,500
Bye: Parramatta Eels & Sydney Roosters.

== Round 17 ==
Home	Score	Away	Match information
Home	Score	Away	Date and time (Local)	Venue (Broadcaster)	Referees	Attendance Capacity
Sydney Roosters	20-24	Canterbury-Bankstown Bulldogs	30 Jun 2016, 7:50 pm	Allianz Stadium (Nine Network)		7,741 / 45,500
Brisbane Broncos	6-48	Melbourne Storm	1 Jul 2016, 7:50 pm	Suncorp Stadium (Nine Network)		44,519 / 52,500
New Zealand Warriors	27-18	Gold Coast Titans	2 Jul 2016, 3:00 pm	Mt Smart Stadium (Fox Sports)		15,107 / 30,000
Wests Tigers	34-26	Penrith Panthers	2 Jul 2016, 5:30 pm	ANZ Stadium (Fox Sports)		10,580 / 83,500
Cronulla-Sutherland Sharks	34-24	Parramatta Eels	2 Jul 2016, 7:30 pm	Southern Cross Group Stadium (Fox Sports)		19,124 / 22,000
Canberra Raiders	29-25 (gp)	Newcastle Knights	3 Jul 2016, 2:00 pm	GIO Stadium (Fox Sports)		9,731 / 25,011
South Sydney Rabbitohs	0-20	North Queensland Cowboys	3 Jul 2016, 4:00 pm	Barlow Park (Nine Network)		14,923 / 18,000
Manly-Warringah Sea Eagles	36-6	St. George Illawarra Dragons	4 Jul 2016, 7:00 pm	Brookvale Oval (Fox Sports)		9,048 / 23,000
Newcastle lead Canberra 22-0 after 23 minutes

== Round 18 ==
Home	Score	Away	Match information
Home	Score	Away	Date and time (Local)	Venue (Broadcaster)	Referees	Attendance Capacity
Parramatta Eels	22-18	Sydney Roosters	8 Jul 2016, 7:50 pm	Pirtek Stadium (Nine Network)	Matt Cecchin/Gavin Badger	8,464 / 20,741
Canterbury-Bankstown Bulldogs	32-22	Wests Tigers	9 Jul 2016, 7:30 pm	ANZ Stadium (Fox Sports)	Ashley Klein/Chris James	16,212 / 83,500
Penrith Panthers	10-26	Cronulla-Sutherland Sharks	10 Jul 2016, 4:00 pm	Pepper Stadium (Nine Network)	Jared Maxwell/Henry Perenara	12,862 / 22,500
Canberra Raiders	26-12	North Queensland Cowboys	11 Jul 2016, 7:00 pm	GIO Stadium (Fox Sports)		8,328 / 25,011
Bye: St. George Illawarra Dragons, Manly-Warringah Sea Eagles, Newcastle Knights, South Sydney Rabbitohs, Brisbane Broncos, New Zealand Warriors, Gold Coast Titans & Melbourne Storm.

== Round 19 ==
Home	Score	Away	Match information
Home	Score	Away	Date and time (Local)	Venue (Broadcaster)	Referees	Attendance Capacity
St. George Illawarra Dragons	12-32	Gold Coast Titans	15 Jul 2016, 7:50 pm	Jubilee Oval (Nine Network)		8,256 / 20,500
Manly-Warringah Sea Eagles	15-14 (gp)	New Zealand Warriors	16 Jul 2016, 3:30 pm	nib Stadium (Fox Sports)		11,109 / 20,500
South Sydney Rabbitohs	10-30	Brisbane Broncos	16 Jul 2016, 7:30 pm	ANZ Stadium (Fox Sports)		13,111 / 83,500
Newcastle Knights	16-20	Melbourne Storm	17 Jul 2016, 2:00 pm	Hunter Stadium (Fox Sports)		10,748 / 33,000
Penrith Panthers	22-18	Parramatta Eels	17 Jul 2016, 4:00 pm	Pepper Stadium (Nine Network)		15,251 / 22,500
Sydney Roosters	20-32	Cronulla-Sutherland Sharks	18 Jul 2016, 7:00 pm	Allianz Stadium (Fox Sports)		9,276 / 45,500
Bye: Canterbury-Bankstown Bulldogs, Wests Tigers, Canberra Raiders & North Queensland Cowboys.

== Round 20 ==
Home	Score	Away	Match information
Home	Score	Away	Date and time (Local)	Venue (Broadcaster)	Referees	Attendance Capacity
North Queensland Cowboys	36-0	Canterbury-Bankstown Bulldogs	21 Jul 2016, 7:50 pm	1300SMILES Stadium (Nine Network)		11,620 / 26,500
Brisbane Broncos	12-31	Penrith Panthers	22 Jul 2016, 7:50 pm	Suncorp Stadium (Nine Network)		30,878 / 52,500
Canberra Raiders	26-22 (gp)	New Zealand Warriors	23 Jul 2016, 3:00 pm	GIO Stadium (Fox Sports)		9,471 / 25,011
Gold Coast Titans	34-14	Parramatta Eels	23 Jul 2016, 5:30 pm	Cbus Super Stadium (Fox Sports)		15,273 / 27,400
Melbourne Storm	26-10	Sydney Roosters	23 Jul 2016, 7:30 pm	AAMI Park (Fox Sports)		12,604 / 30,050
Cronulla-Sutherland Sharks	36-4	Newcastle Knights	24 Jul 2016, 2:00 pm	Southern Cross Group Stadium (Fox Sports)		16,882 / 22,000
St. George Illawarra Dragons	12-25	Wests Tigers	24 Jul 2016, 4:00 pm	ANZ Stadium (Nine Network)		15,087 / 83,500
South Sydney Rabbitohs	12-20	Manly-Warringah Sea Eagles	25 Jul 2016, 7:00 pm	Allianz Stadium (Fox Sports)		8,273 / 45,500

The Sharks beat Newcastle to win 15 games in a row.

== Round 21 ==
Home	Score	Away	Match information
Home	Score	Away	Date and time (Local)	Venue (Broadcaster)	Referees	Attendance Capacity
Sydney Roosters	32-16	Brisbane Broncos	28 Jul 2016, 7:50 pm	Allianz Stadium (Nine Network)		6,308 / 45,500
Canterbury-Bankstown Bulldogs	13-10	St. George Illawarra Dragons	29 Jul 2016, 7:50 pm	ANZ Stadium (Nine Network)		15,008 / 83,500
New Zealand Warriors	20-16 (gp)	Penrith Panthers	30 Jul 2016, 2:30 pm	Mt Smart Stadium (Fox Sports)		13,026 / 30,000
Parramatta Eels	8-23	Wests Tigers	30 Jul 2016, 5:00 pm	ANZ Stadium (Fox Sports)		14,428 / 83,500
North Queensland Cowboys	8-16	Melbourne Storm	30 Jul 2016, 7:00 pm	1300SMILES Stadium (Fox Sports)		20,256 / 26,500
South Sydney Rabbitohs	4-54	Canberra Raiders	31 Jul 2016, 1:30 pm	ANZ Stadium (Fox Sports)		10,076 / 83,500
Manly-Warringah Sea Eagles	36-16	Newcastle Knights	31 Jul 2016, 3:30 pm	Brookvale Oval (Nine Network)		11,222 / 23,000
Gold Coast Titans	18-18 (gp)	Cronulla-Sutherland Sharks	1 Aug 2016, 7:00 pm	Cbus Super Stadium (Fox Sports)		14,918 / 27,400

== Round 22 ==
Home	Score	Away	Match information
Home	Score	Away	Date and time (Local)	Venue (Broadcaster)	Referees	Attendance Capacity
St. George Illawarra Dragons	8-12	Brisbane Broncos	4 Aug 2016, 7:50 pm	WIN Stadium (Nine Network)		5,662 / 23,000
Parramatta Eels	10-9	Manly-Warringah Sea Eagles	5 Aug 2016, 7:50 pm	Pirtek Stadium (Nine Network)		8,143 / 20,741
Newcastle Knights	14-28	Canterbury-Bankstown Bulldogs	6 Aug 2016, 2:30 pm	Hunter Stadium (Fox Sports)		13,318/ 33,000
Cronulla-Sutherland Sharks	14-30	Canberra Raiders	6 Aug 2016, 5:00 pm	Southern Cross Group Stadium (Fox Sports)		15,133/ 22,000
Melbourne Storm	15-14 (gp)	South Sydney Rabbitohs	6 Aug 2016, 7:00 pm	AAMI Park (Fox Sports)		13,569 / 30,050
Gold Coast Titans	14-24	New Zealand Warriors	7 Aug 2016, 1:30 pm	Cbus Super Stadium (Fox Sports)		25,109 / 27,400
Wests Tigers	26-14	North Queensland Cowboys	7 Aug 2016, 3:30 pm	Leichhardt Oval (Nine Network)		14,246 / 20,000
Penrith Panthers	38-18	Sydney Roosters	8 Aug 2016, 7:00 pm	Pepper Stadium (Fox Sports)		9,653 / 22,500

The Sharks suffer their first defeat since Round 3 against Manly

== Round 23 ==
Home	Score	Away	Match information
Home	Score	Away	Date and time (Local)	Venue (Broadcaster)	Referees	Attendance Capacity
Canterbury-Bankstown Bulldogs	20-16 (gp)	Manly-Warringah Sea Eagles	11 Aug 2016, 7:50 pm	ANZ Stadium (Nine Network)		10,290 / 83,500
Brisbane Broncos	38-16	Parramatta Eels	12 Aug 2016, 7:50 pm	Suncorp Stadium (Nine Network)		30,189 / 52,500
Wests Tigers	18-19	Gold Coast Titans	13 Aug 2016, 2:30 pm	Campbelltown Stadium (Fox Sports)		16,783 / 20,000
New Zealand Warriors	22-41	South Sydney Rabbitohs	13 Aug 2016, 5:00 pm	Mt Smart Stadium (Fox Sports)		17,409 / 30,000
St. George Illawarra Dragons	32-18	Cronulla-Sutherland Sharks	13 Aug 2016, 7:00 pm	Jubilee Oval (Fox Sports)		13,167 / 20,500
Newcastle Knights	6-42	Penrith Panthers	14 Aug 2016, 1:30 pm	Hunter Stadium (Fox Sports)		13,771 / 33,000
Sydney Roosters	22-10	North Queensland Cowboys	14 Aug 2016, 3:30 pm	Allianz Stadium (Nine Network)		8,760 / 45,500
Canberra Raiders	22-8	Melbourne Storm	15 Aug 2016, 7:00 pm	GIO Stadium (Fox Sports)		15,707 / 25,011

== Round 24 ==
Home	Score	Away	Match information
Home	Score	Away	Date and time (Local)	Venue (Broadcaster)	Referees	Attendance Capacity
Brisbane Broncos	20-10	Canterbury-Bankstown Bulldogs	18 Aug 2016, 7:50 pm	Suncorp Stadium (Nine Network)		27,746 / 52,500
Penrith Panthers	40-10	Wests Tigers	19 Aug 2016, 7:50 pm	Pepper Stadium (Nine Network)		14,876 / 22,500
Newcastle Knights	6-26	Gold Coast Titans	20 Aug 2016, 2:30 pm	Hunter Stadium (Fox Sports)		10,960 / 33,000
Manly-Warringah Sea Eagles	18-38	Melbourne Storm	20 Aug 2016, 5:00 pm	Brookvale Oval (Fox Sports)		8,241 / 23,000
North Queensland Cowboys	34-6	New Zealand Warriors	20 Aug 2016, 7:00 pm	1300SMILES Stadium (Fox Sports)		15,676 / 26,500
Canberra Raiders	28-18	Parramatta Eels	21 Aug 2016, 1:30 pm	GIO Stadium (Fox Sports)		18,825 / 25,011
Sydney Roosters	42-6	St. George Illawarra Dragons	21 Aug 2016, 3:30 pm	Allianz Stadium (Nine Network)		11,486 / 45,500
South Sydney Rabbitohs	12-6	Cronulla-Sutherland Sharks	22 Aug 2016, 7:00 pm	ANZ Stadium (Fox Sports)		7,588 / 83,500

== Round 25 ==
Home	Score	Away	Match information
Home	Score	Away	Date and time (Local)	Venue (Broadcaster)	Referees	Attendance Capacity
Canterbury-Bankstown Bulldogs	16-24	North Queensland Cowboys	25 Aug 2016, 7:50 pm	Belmore Sports Ground (Nine Network)	Jared Maxwell, Chris James	10,144 / 19,000
Melbourne Storm	16-26	Brisbane Broncos	26 Aug 2016, 7:50 pm	AAMI Park (Nine Network)	Ashley Klein, Gavin Badger.	20,263 / 30,050
Manly-Warringah Sea Eagles	30-44	Canberra Raiders	27 Aug 2016, 3:00 pm	Brookvale Oval (Fox Sports)	Ben Cummins, Gavin Badger	11,137 / 23,000
Gold Coast Titans	14-15	Penrith Panthers	27 Aug 2016, 5:30 pm	Cbus Super Stadium (Fox Sports)	Grant Atkins, Chris Sutton	18,288 / 27,400
Cronulla-Sutherland Sharks	37-12	Sydney Roosters	27 Aug 2016, 7:30 pm	Southern Cross Group Stadium (Fox Sports)	Matt Cecchin, David Munro	14,457 / 22,000
New Zealand Warriors	24-36	Wests Tigers	28 Aug 2016, 2:00 pm	Mt Smart Stadium (Fox Sports)	Gerard Sutton, Alan Shortall	14,020 / 30,000
Newcastle Knights	12-34	South Sydney Rabbitohs	28 Aug 2016, 4:00 pm	Hunter Stadium (Nine Network)	Henry Perenara, Jon Stone	15,212 / 33,000
Parramatta Eels	30-18	St. George Illawarra Dragons	29 Aug 2016, 7:00 pm	Pirtek Stadium (Fox Sports)	Adam Gee, Gavin Reynolds	13,553 / 20,741

== Round 26 ==
Home	Score	Away	Match information
Home	Score	Away	Date and time (Local)	Venue (Broadcaster)	Referees	Attendance Capacity
Brisbane Broncos	24-14	Sydney Roosters	1 Sep 2016, 7:50 pm	Suncorp Stadium (Nine Network)		37,566 / 52,500
Canterbury-Bankstown Bulldogs	10-28	South Sydney Rabbitohs	2 Sep 2016, 7:50 pm	ANZ Stadium (Nine Network)		14,731 / 83,500
St. George Illawarra Dragons	28-26	Newcastle Knights	3 Sep 2016, 3:00 pm	Jubilee Oval (Fox Sports)		8,726 / 20,500
North Queensland Cowboys	32-16	Gold Coast Titans	3 Sep 2016, 5:30 pm	1300SMILES Stadium (Fox Sports)		21,495 / 26,500
Melbourne Storm	26-6	Cronulla-Sutherland Sharks	3 Sep 2016, 7:30 pm	AAMI Park (Fox Sports)		24,135 / 30,050
Wests Tigers	10-52	Canberra Raiders	4 Sep 2016, 2:00 pm	Leichhardt Oval (Fox Sports)		18,634 / 20,000
New Zealand Warriors	18-40	Parramatta Eels	4 Sep 2016, 6:00 pm	Mt Smart Stadium (Nine Network)		11,129 / 30,000
Penrith Panthers	36-6	Manly-Warringah Sea Eagles	4 Sep 2016, 6:30 pm	Pepper Stadium (Fox Sports)		15,411 / 22,500

During this round there was a very unusual event. The Melbourne Storm and Cronulla Sharks fought for the minor Premiership with the Sharks going down 26–6 to the Storm. However, because of the 20 point loss the Cronulla Sharks dropped to third, overtaken by the Canberra Raiders who beat Wests Tigers 52–10. This then resulted in a different top 2 then the ones that fought for the Minor Premiership.

== Finals series ==
Qualifying and elimination finals
10 Sept, Melbourne Rectangular Stadium
1	Melbourne	16
4	North Queensland	10
9 Sept, Lang Park
5	Brisbane	44
8	Gold Coast	28
11 Sept, Sydney Football Stadium
6	Penrith	28
7	Canterbury	12
10 Sept, Canberra Stadium
2	Canberra	14
3	Cronulla	16

Semi-finals
16 Sept, Willows Sports Complex
North Queensland	26
Brisbane	20
17 Sept, Canberra Stadium
Canberra	22
Penrith	12

Preliminary finals
24 Sept, Melbourne Rectangular Stadium
Melbourne	14
Canberra	12
23 Sept, Sydney Football Stadium
Cronulla	32
North Queensland	20

Grand final
2 Oct, Stadium Australia
Melbourne	12
Cronulla	14

For the fifth year the NRL uses the finals system previously implemented by the ARL competition from the 1990s (also used as the AFL final eight system) to decide the grand finalists from the top eight finishing teams. were featured in the preceding finals series.

Home	Score	Away	Match Information
Home	Score	Away	Date and Time (Local)	Venue (Broadcaster)	Referees	Attendance Capacity
QUALIFYING & ELIMINATION Finals
Brisbane Broncos	44-28	Gold Coast Titans	9 September 8:15 pm	Suncorp Stadium (Nine Network)	Gerard Sutton, Gavin Badger	43,170 / 52,500
Canberra Raiders	14-16	Cronulla-Sutherland Sharks	10 September 5:50 pm	GIO Stadium (Nine Network)	Matt Cecchin, Alan Shortall	25,592 / 25,592
Melbourne Storm	16-10	North Queensland Cowboys	10 September 8:15 pm	AAMI Park (Nine Network)	Ben Cummins, Grant Atkins	21,233 / 30,050
Penrith Panthers	28-12	Canterbury-Bankstown Bulldogs	11 September 4:10 pm	Allianz Stadium (Nine Network)	Jared Maxwell, Chris James	22,631 / 45,500
SEMI Finals
North Queensland Cowboys	26-20 (et)	Brisbane Broncos	16 September 8:15 pm	1300SMILES Stadium (Nine Network)	Matt Cecchin, Alan Shortall.	23,804 / 26,500
Canberra Raiders	22-12	Penrith Panthers	17 September 7:45 pm	GIO Stadium (Nine Network)	Ben Cummins, Gerard Sutton.	21,498 / 25,011
PRELIMINARY Finals
Cronulla-Sutherland Sharks	32-20	North Queensland Cowboys	23 September 8:15 pm	Allianz Stadium (Nine Network)	Ben Cummins, Gerard Sutton	36,717 / 45,500
Melbourne Storm	14-12	Canberra Raiders	24 September 7:45 pm	AAMI Park (Nine Network)	Matt Cecchin, Alan Shortall	28,161 / 30,050
GRAND FINAL
Melbourne Storm	12-14	Cronulla-Sutherland Sharks	2 October	ANZ Stadium (Nine Network)	Matt Cecchin, Ben Cummins	83,625 / 83,625

=== Qualifying And Elimination Finals ===
1st Elimination Final

Friday, 9 September
7:55PM

Brisbane Broncos	44 – 28	Gold Coast Titans
Tries: Jordan Kahu (10' pen, 23') 2 Alex Glenn (42', 51') 2 Corey Oates (62', 79') 2 Jarrod Wallace (27') 1 Anthony Milford (70') 1 Goals: Jordan Kahu 6/7 (11', 29', 43', 52', 64', 71'); Corey Parker 0/1	1st: 16 - 18; 2nd: 28 - 10	Tries: 2 (3', 66') Chris McQueen; 1 (15') David Mead; 1 (38') Josh Hoffman; 1 (74') Ryan James; Goals: 4/5 Tyrone Roberts (5', 16', 40', 75')

Suncorp Stadium, Brisbane
Attendance: 43,170
Referee: Gerard Sutton, Gavin Badger
Player of the Match: Jordan Kahu

1st Qualifying Final

Saturday, 10 September
5:35PM

Canberra Raiders	14 – 16	Cronulla Sutherland Sharks
Tries: Josh Hodgson (13') 1 Jordan Rapana (18') 1 Goals: Jarrod Croker 3/3 (14', 19', 45' pen)	1st: 12 - 6; 2nd: 2 - 10	Tries: 1 (39') Matt Prior; 1 (50') Valentine Holmes; Goals: 4/4 James Maloney (40', 51', 67' pen, 76' pen)

GIO Stadium, Canberra
Attendance: 25,592
Referee: Matt Cecchin, Alan Shortall
Player of the Match: Matt Prior

2nd Qualifying Final

Saturday, 10 September
7:55PM

Melbourne Storm	16 – 10	North Queensland Cowboys
Tries: Suliasi Vunivalu (32') 1 Jesse Bromwich (52') 1 Goals: Cameron Smith 4/5 (30' pen, 49' pen, 54', 77' pen)	1st: 6 - 6; 2nd: 10 - 4	Tries: 1 (40') Antonio Winterstein; 1 (62') Kyle Feldt; Goals: 1/2 Johnathan Thurston (40')

AAMI Park, Melbourne
Attendance: 21,233
Referee: Ben Cummins, Grant Atkins
Player of the Match: Jesse Bromwich

2nd Elimination Final

Sunday, 11 September
4:10PM

Penrith Panthers	28 – 12	Canterbury Bankstown Bulldogs
Tries: Dallin Watene-Zelezniak (35') 1 Waqa Blake (43') 1 Peter Wallace (54') 1 Tyrone Peachey (62') 1 Josh Mansour (75') 1 Goals: Nathan Cleary 4/6 (45', 56', 63', 66' pen)	1st: 4 - 6; 2nd: 24 - 6	Tries: 1 (14') Moses Mbye; 1 (78') Sam Perrett; Goals: 1/2 Moses Mbye (36' pen); 1/1 Sam Perrett (80')

Allianz Stadium, Sydney
Attendance: 22,631
Referee: Jared Maxwell, Chris James
Player of the Match: Matt Moylan

=== Semi-finals ===
1st Semi-final

Friday, 16 September
8:15PM

North Queensland Cowboys	26 – 20	Brisbane Broncos
Tries: Justin O'Neill (57', 62') 2 Coen Hess (19') 1 Michael Morgan (85') 1 Goals: Johnathan Thurston 5/6 (34' pen, 59', 64', 79' pen, 85')	1st: 6 - 14; 2nd: 14 - 6 ET: 6 - 0	Tries: 1 (4') Andrew McCullough; 1 (39') Jordan Kahu; 1 (69') Corey Oates; Goals: 4/4 Jordan Kahu (5', 12' pen, 40', 71')

1300SMILES Stadium, Townsville
Attendance: 23,804
Referee: Matt Cecchin, Alan Shortall
Player of the Match: Jason Taumalolo

Match decided in extra time.
2nd Semi-final

Saturday, 17 September
7:45PM

Canberra Raiders	22 – 12	Penrith Panthers
Tries: Blake Austin (12') 1 Jordan Rapana (35') 1 Jarrod Croker (43') 1 Goals: Jarrod Croker 5/5 (13', 37', 45', 75' pen, 80' pen)	1st: 12 - 0; 2nd: 10 - 12	Tries: 1 (59') Tyrone Peachey; 1 (65') Dallin Watene-Zelezniak; Goals: 2/2 Nathan Cleary (61',67')

GIO Stadium, Canberra
Attendance: 21,498
Referee: Ben Cummins, Gerard Sutton
Player of the Match: Joseph Leilua

=== Preliminary Finals ===
1st Preliminary Final

Friday, 23 September
8:15PM

Cronulla Sutherland Sharks	32 – 20	North Queensland Cowboys
Tries: James Maloney (55', 65') 2 Sosaia Feki (22') 1 Chad Townsend (36') 1 Luke Lewis (51') 1 Goals: James Maloney 6/8 (17' pen, 27' pen, 37', 51', 56', 64 pen)	1st: 14 - 0; 2nd: 18 - 20	Tries: 2 (70', 77') Kyle Feldt; 1 (42') Lachlan Coote; 1 (79') Coen Hess; Goals: 2/4 Johnathan Thurston (42', 77')

Allianz Stadium, Sydney
Attendance: 36,717
Referee: Ben Cummins, Gerard Sutton
Player of the Match: James Maloney

2nd Preliminary Final

Saturday, 24 September
7:45PM

Melbourne Storm	14 – 12	Canberra Raiders
Tries: Cooper Cronk (32') 1 Cheyse Blair (60') 1 Goals: Cameron Smith 3/4 (16' pen, 33', 64' pen)	1st: 8 - 6; 2nd: 6 - 6	Tries: 1 (23') Jordan Rapana; 1 (76') Elliott Whitehead; Goals: 2/2 Aiden Sezer (25', 77')

AAMI Park, Melbourne
Attendance: 28,161
Referee: Matt Cecchin, Alan Shortall
Player of the Match: Cooper Cronk

== 2016 NRL Grand Final ==
Sunday, 2 October
7:15pm (AEDT)

Melbourne Storm	12 – 14	Cronulla-Sutherland Sharks
Tries: Jesse Bromwich (50') 1 Will Chambers (64') 1 Goals: Cameron Smith 2/2 (51', 66')	1st: 0 - 8; 2nd: 12 - 6	Tries: 1 (15') Ben Barba; 1 (69') Andrew Fifita; Goals: 3/3 James Maloney (8' pen, 16', 71')

ANZ Stadium, Sydney
Attendance: 83,625
Referee: Matt Cecchin, Ben Cummins
Clive Churchill Medal: Luke Lewis
