= 2017 Cronulla-Sutherland Sharks season =

- NRL rank: 5th
- Play-off result: Qualifying Finalist
- 2017 record: Wins: 15; losses: 9
- Points scored: For: 476; against: 407

Team information
- CEO: Lyall Gorman
- Coach: Shane Flanagan
- Assistant coach: Steve Price
- Captains: Paul Gallen; Wade Graham
- Stadium: Shark Park
- Avg. attendance: 12,953

Top scorers
- Tries: Sosaia Feki (13)
- Goals: James Maloney (71)
- Points: James Maloney (161)
← 2016	2018 →

The 2017 Cronulla-Sutherland Sharks season was the 51st in the club's history. Coached by Shane Flanagan and captained by Paul Gallen, they competed in the National Rugby League's 2017 Telstra Premiership.

== Important Matches ==
- Round 1 : Jayden Brailey, NRL Debut
- Round 1 : Edrick Lee, Club Debut
- Round 3 : James Segeyaro, Club Debut
- Round 5 : Chris Heighington, 300th NRL Match
- Round 6 : Chris Heighington, 100th Cronulla Sutherland Sharks Match
- Round 9 : Tony Williams, Club Debut
- Round 15 : Daniel Mortimer, Club Debut
- Round 16 : Sosaia Feki, 100th NRL Match
- Round 20 : Luke Lewis, 300th NRL Match
- Round 23 : Paul Gallen, 300th NRL Match
- Round 24 : James Maloney, 200th NRL Match
- Round 24 : Ricky Leutele, 100th NRL Match
- Round 25 : Wade Graham, 200th NRL Match
- Round 26 : Matt Prior, 200th NRL Match
- Round 26 : Jesse Ramien, NRL Debut

== Ladder ==
2017 NRL season
Pos	Team	Pld	W	D	L	B	PF	PA	PD	Pts
1	Melbourne Storm (P)	24	20	0	4	2	633	336	+297	44
2	Sydney Roosters	24	17	0	7	2	500	428	+72	38
3	Brisbane Broncos	24	16	0	8	2	597	433	+164	36
4	Parramatta Eels	24	16	0	8	2	496	457	+39	36
5	Cronulla-Sutherland Sharks	24	15	0	9	2	476	407	+69	34
6	Manly-Warringah Sea Eagles	24	14	0	10	2	552	512	+40	32
7	Penrith Panthers	24	13	0	11	2	504	459	+45	30
8	North Queensland Cowboys	24	13	0	11	2	467	443	+24	30
9	St. George Illawarra Dragons	24	12	0	12	2	533	450	+83	28
10	Canberra Raiders	24	11	0	13	2	558	497	+61	26
11	Canterbury-Bankstown Bulldogs	24	10	0	14	2	360	455	−95	24
12	South Sydney Rabbitohs	24	9	0	15	2	464	564	−100	22
13	New Zealand Warriors	24	7	0	17	2	444	575	−131	18
14	Wests Tigers	24	7	0	17	2	413	571	−158	18
15	Gold Coast Titans	24	7	0	17	2	448	638	−190	18
16	Newcastle Knights	24	5	0	19	2	428	648	−220	14

== Results ==
- Round 1 - Cronulla Sharks vs Brisbane Broncos (18 - 26)

Tries: Gerard Beale, James Maloney, Ricky Leutele

- Round 2 - Canberra Raiders vs Cronulla Sharks (16 - 42)

Tries: Wade Graham (3), Ricky Leutele, Jayden Brailey, Matt Prior, Paul Gallen

- Round 3 - Cronulla Sharks vs St George Illawarra Dragons (10 - 16)

Tries: Luke Lewis, Edrick Lee

- Round 4 - Parramatta Eels vs Cronulla Sharks (6 - 20)

Tries: Jayden Brailey, Sosaia Feki, James Maloney

- Round 5 - Cronulla Sharks vs Newcastle Knights (19 - 18)

Tries: Gerard Beale, Sosaia Feki, Valentine Holmes

Field Goal: James Maloney

- Round 6 - Melbourne Storm vs Cronulla Sharks (2 - 11)

Tries: James Segeyaro

Field Goal: James Maloney

- Round 7 - Penrith Panthers vs Cronulla Sharks (2 - 28)

Tries: James Maloney, Sosaia Feki, Jack Bird, Paul Gallen, Andrew Fifita

- Round 8 - Cronulla Sharks vs Gold Coast Titans (12 - 16)

Tries: Ricky Leutele, Jayson Bukuya

- Round 9 - Wests Tigers vs Cronulla Sharks (16 - 22)

Tries: Tony Williams, Sosaia Feki, Valentine Holmes, Chad Townsend

- Round 10 - St George Illawarra Dragons vs Cronulla Sharks (14 - 18)

Tries: Sosaia Feki (2), Ricky Leutele

- Round 11 - Cronulla Sharks vs North Queensland Cowboys (18 - 14)

Tries: James Maloney, Chad Townsend, Sosaia Feki

- Round 12 - Cronulla Sharks vs Canterbury Bankstown Bulldogs (9 - 8)

Tries: Gerard Beale

Field Goal: Chad Townsend

- Round 14 - Cronulla Sharks vs Melbourne Storm (13 - 18)

Tries Luke Lewis, Sosaia Feki

- Round 15 - Cronulla Sharks vs Wests Tigers (24 - 22)

Tries: Kurt Capewell (2), Chad Townsend, Edrick Lee, Jayson Bukuya

- Round 16 - Cronulla Sharks vs Manly Sea Eagles (18 - 35)

Tries: Luke Lewis, Sosaia Feki, Wade Graham

- Round 17 - Sydney Roosters vs Cronulla Sharks (12 - 44)

Tries: Ricky Leutele (2), Jack Bird, Valentine Holmes, Sosaia Feki, Luke Lewis, Gerard Beale

- Round 19 - Gold Coast Titans vs Cronulla Sharks (30 - 10)

Tries: Kurt Capewell, Sosaia Feki

- Round 20 - Cronulla Sharks vs South Sydney Rabbitohs (26 - 12)

Tries: Wade Graham, Fa'amanu Brown, Gerard Beale, Ricky Leutele

- Round 21 - New Zealand Warriors vs Cronulla Sharks (12 - 26)

Tries: Kurt Capewell, Fa'amanu Brown, Sosaia Feki, Jayson Bukuya

- Round 22 - Cronulla Sharks vs Canberra Raiders (12 - 30)

Tries: Sosaia Feki, Gerard Beale

- Round 23 - Brisbane Broncos vs Cronulla Sharks (10-32)

Tries: Luke Lewis, Gerard Beale

- Round 24 - North Queensland Cowboys vs Cronulla Sharks (16 - 26)

Tries: Jayden Brailey, Paul Gallen, Chad Townsend, Valentine Holmes

- Round 25 - Cronulla Sharks vs Sydney Roosters (14 - 16)

Tries: Valentine Holmes, Luke Lewis

- Round 26 - Newcastle Knights vs Cronulla Sharks (18 - 26)

Tries: Valentine Holmes, Chad Townsend, Jayden Brailey, Jesse Ramien

- Finals Week 1 - Cronulla Sharks vs North Queensland Cowboys (14 - 15)

Tries: Chad Townsend, Jack Bird
