= Daniel Alvaro =

Italy international rugby league footballer

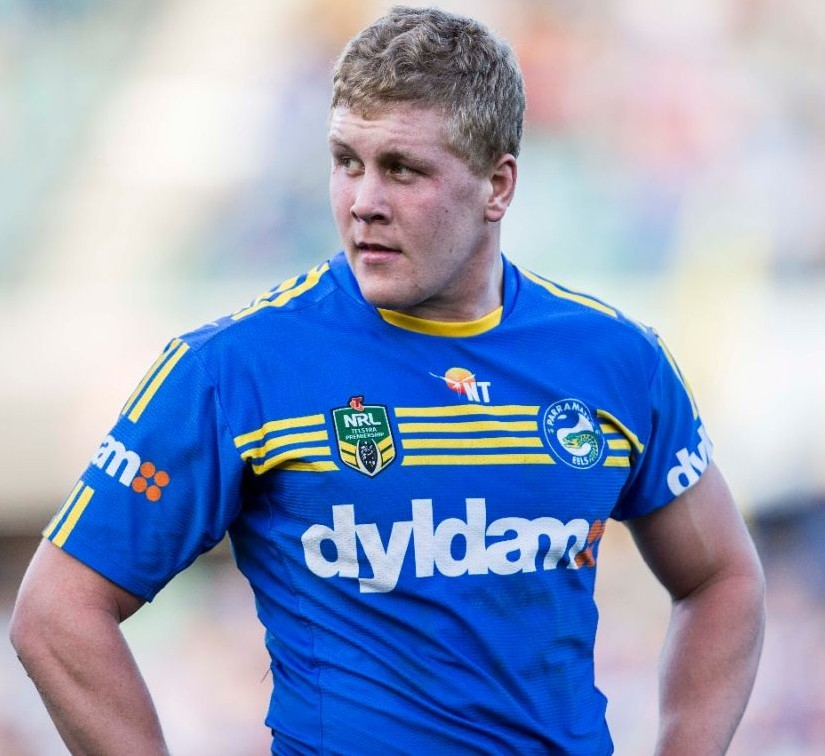

Personal information
- Born: 28 May 1993 (age 33) Newtown, New South Wales, Australia
- Height: 190 cm (6 ft 3 in)
- Weight: 115 kg (18 st 2 lb)

Playing information
- Position: Prop
Club
Years	Team	Pld	T	G	FG	P
2015–20	Parramatta Eels	89	6	0	0	24
2020(loan)	→ New Zealand Warriors	6	0	0	0	0
2021–22	St. George Illawarra	19	0	0	0	0
2022–23	Toulouse Olympique	15	1	0	0	4
	Total	129	7	0	0	28
Representative
Years	Team	Pld	T	G	FG	P
2015–16	NSW Residents	2	0	0	0	0
2017	NSW Country	1	0	0	0	0
2017	Italy	3	0	0	0	0
- Source: As of 10 January 2024

Daniel Alvaro (born 28 May 1993) is a former Italy international rugby league footballer who plays as a prop for the Toulouse Olympique in the Super League.

He previously played for the Parramatta Eels and the New Zealand Warriors in the National Rugby League and at representative level he played for NSW Country in 2017.

== Background ==
Alvaro was born in Newtown, New South Wales, Australia. He is of Italian heritage through his paternal grandfather, Roy, who was born and raised in Sinopoli, Calabria before moving to Australia at the age of 18.

He played his junior rugby league for the Mittagong Lions before being signed by the Brisbane Broncos in 2009.

== Playing career ==
=== Early career ===
Alvaro played for the Easts Tigers' Cyril Connell Cup team in 2009 and for their Mal Meninga Cup team in 2010, winning their Player of the Year award. In 2010, he represented the Queensland under-18 Maroons against New South Wales Country. In 2011, he played for the Wynnum Manly Seagulls' Mal Meninga Cup side and represented the Queensland under-18 team.

In 2011 and 2012, Alvaro played for the Brisbane Broncos' NYC team. In 2013, he joined the Parramatta Eels and played for their NYC team, before moving on to their New South Wales Cup team, Wentworthville Magpies in 2014.

=== 2015 ===
On 3 May, Alvaro played for the New South Wales Residents against the Queensland Residents. In Round 12 of the 2015 NRL season, he made his NRL debut for the Eels against the Penrith Panthers. On 26 August, he re-signed with the Eels on a 1-year contract. On 27 September, he was named on the interchange bench in the 2015 New South Wales Cup Team of the Year.

=== 2016 ===
On 26 February, Alvaro re-signed with the Eels on a 2-year contract.

=== 2017 ===
Alvaro was part of The Parramatta side which made the finals for the first time in eight years by finishing fourth at the end of the regular season. He made a total of 25 appearances and scored two tries. At seasons end, Alvaro was selected to play for Italy in The 2017 Rugby League World Cup. Alvaro played in all 3 pool matches as Italy were eliminated at the group stages.

=== 2018 ===
On 28 August, Alvaro was named the Ken Thornett medalist after being voted as the Parramatta player of the year.

=== 2019 ===
Alvaro started the 2019 season as one of Parramatta's first choice front rowers. On Easter Monday 22 April, Alvaro took the first hitup to open the new Bankwest Stadium. After taking the first hitup, Alvaro was taken from the field with concussion and did not make any further contribution to the game. Parramatta would go on to win the match 51-6.

On 28 May, Alvaro was demoted to reserve grade by coach Brad Arthur along with Tim Mannah, Brad Takairangi and George Jennings following the club's third straight defeat, the last of which came against bottom placed side Penrith.

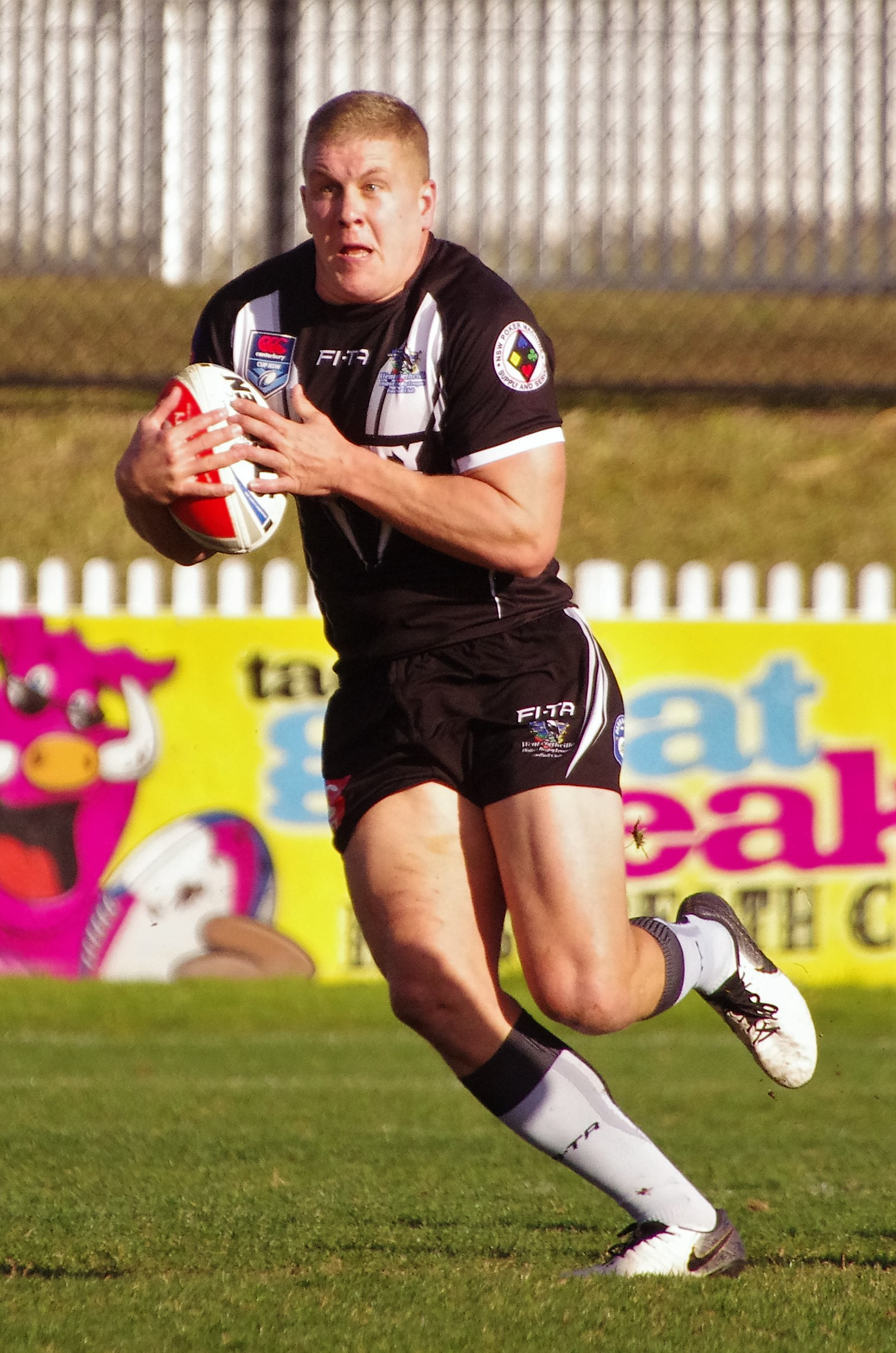
Alvaro playing for the Wentworthville Magpies in 2019

In Round 22 against the Gold Coast, Alvaro scored his first try in nearly two years as Parramatta won the match 36-12 at Cbus Super Stadium.

At the end of the 2019 regular season, Parramatta finished 5th on the table and qualified for the finals. In the elimination final against Brisbane, Alvaro scored a try as Parramatta won the match 58-0 at the new Western Sydney Stadium. The victory was the biggest finals win in history, eclipsing Newtown's 55-7 win over St George in 1944. The match was also Parramatta's biggest win over Brisbane and Brisbane's worst ever loss since entering the competition in 1988.

=== 2020 ===
Midway through the 2020 NRL season, Alvaro was loaned out to the struggling New Zealand Warriors side after making only one appearance for Parramatta. Alvaro made his debut for the New Zealand Warriors in their 26-20 victory over the Wests Tigers at the Sydney Cricket Ground in round 12 of the 2020 NRL season.

On 17 December, Alvaro signed a two-year deal to join St. George Illawarra starting in 2021.

=== 2021 ===
He made his debut for St. George Illawarra in round 1 of the 2021 NRL season which saw the club lose 32-18 against rivals Cronulla.

On 5 July 2021, Alvaro was fined $15,000 by the NRL and suspended for one game after breaching the game's Covid-19 biosecurity protocols when he attended a party along with 12 other St. George Illawarra players at Paul Vaughan's property

Alvaro played a total of 19 matches for St. George Illawarra in the 2021 NRL season as the club finished 11th on the table and missed out on the finals.

=== 2022 ===
On 5 May, Alvaro signed a three-year deal to join Toulouse Olympique. Alvaro made his club debut for Toulouse in round 12 against Wakefield Trinity which Toulouse won 20-14. Alvaro played a total of 15 matches for Toulouse in the 2022 Super League season as the club were relegated back to the RFL Championship after finishing bottom of the table.

== Statistics ==
Season	Team	Pld	T	G	FG	P
2015	Parramatta Eels	7	2	-	-	8
2016	Parramatta Eels	17	-	-	-	0
2017	Parramatta Eels	25	2	-	-	8
2018	Parramatta Eels	19	—	-	—	0
2019	Parramatta Eels	19	-	—	-	0
2020	Parramatta Eels	2	-	-	-	0
2020	New Zealand Warriors (loan)	6	-	-	-	0
2021	St. George Illawarra Dragons	19	-	-	-	0
2022	Toulouse Olympique	15	1			4
	Totals	129	5	0	0	20
