= Kirisome Auva'a =

Samoa international rugby league footballer

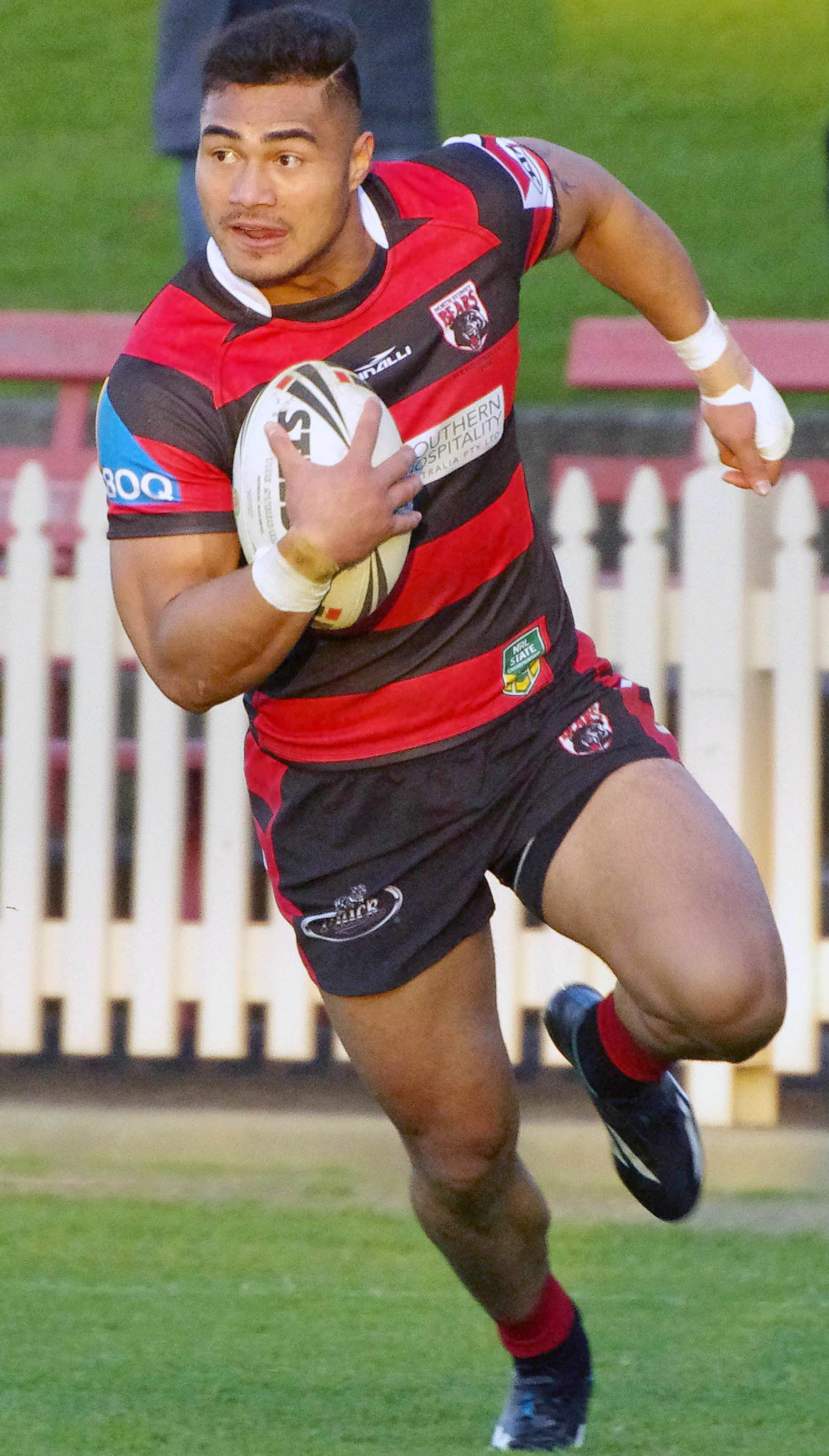

Personal information
- Born: 23 February 1992 (age 34) Motootua, Western Samoa
- Height: 186 cm (6 ft 1 in)
- Weight: 100 kg (15 st 10 lb)

Playing information
- Position: Centre, Wing
Club
Years	Team	Pld	T	G	FG	P
2014–16	South Sydney	39	12	0	0	48
2017–18	Parramatta Eels	22	9	0	0	36
	Total	61	21	0	0	84
Representative
Years	Team	Pld	T	G	FG	P
2016	Samoa	1	0	0	0	0
- Source: As of 19 February 2018

Kirisome Auva'a (born 23 February 1992), also known by the nickname of "Somi", is a Samoan professional rugby league footballer who plays as a centre and winger for the Ipswich Jets in the Queensland Cup. A Samoa international representative, he won the 2014 NRL Premiership with the South Sydney Rabbitohs and has previously played for the Parramatta Eels in the National Rugby League.

== Background ==
Born in Motootua, Samoa, Auva'a moved to New Zealand and played his junior football for the Otahuhu Rovers. Auva'a then moved to Australia as a teenager and attended Ipswich Grammar School in Queensland and played rugby league for the Norths Ipswich Tigers. He represented the Australian A Schoolboys rugby union side.

Auva'a was signed by the Melbourne Storm, playing in their Under-20s team from 2010 to 2012 before joining the Storm's first grade squad. While playing for Melbourne's NYC side, Auva'a represented Queensland Under 18's in 2010, making him eligible for the senior Queensland Origin team, and was the 18th man for Queensland in the inaugural Under 20's Origin game in 2012.

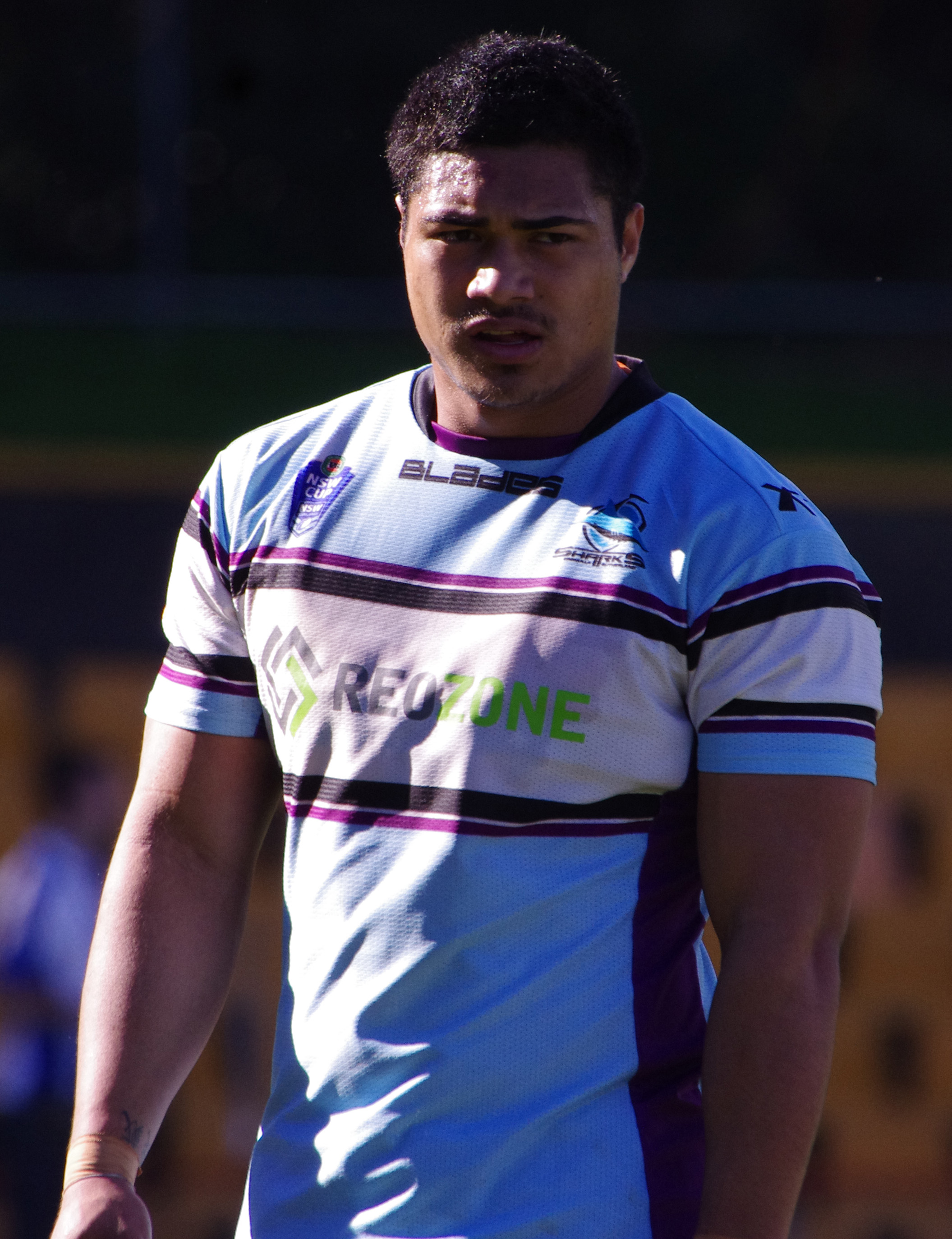
Auva'a playing for the Storm-Sharks combined team in 2013

In 2013, Auva'a played for the Cronulla-Sutherland Sharks in their 2013 New South Wales Cup Grand Final victory over the Windsor Wolves. Auva'a is the cousin of fellow South Sydney Rabbitohs teammate Hymel Hunt.

== Playing career ==
=== 2014 ===
In 2014, Auva'a joined the South Sydney Rabbitohs. In Round 6 of the 2014 NRL season, Auva'a made his NRL debut for South Sydney against the Penrith Panthers, playing at Centre and scoring a try in South Sydney's 18-2 win at Penrith Stadium. His season was interrupted by the repercussions of the domestic violence incident in January, but with the magistrate's deferral of her decision for six months, Auva'a was free to resume playing. On 5 October 2014, in South Sydney's 2014 NRL Grand Final against the Canterbury-Bankstown Bulldogs, Auva’a played at centre and scored a try in Souths 30-6 victory.

=== 2015 ===
On 30 June, Auva'a was cleared by the NRL to play in South Sydney's NSW Cup feeder team North Sydney Bears. He made his return to the Rabbitohs' first-grade squad in Round 23 against the North Queensland Cowboys in the Rabbitohs' 31-18 win at 1300SMILES Stadium. He finished the 2015 season having played in 5 matches for the Rabbitohs. On 14 November, he re-signed on a three-year contract to the end of the 2018 season.

=== 2016 ===
In February, Auva'a played for South Sydney in the 2016 NRL Auckland Nines. On 7 May, he made his international debut for Samoa against Tonga in the 2016 Polynesian Cup, where he played at centre in the 18-6 win at Parramatta Stadium. Auva’a finished the 2016 NRL season with him playing in 13 matches and scoring three tries for South Sydney.

=== 2017 ===
Kirisome signed a one-year deal with the Parramatta Eels starting in 2017. He made his debut against the New Zealand Warriors in Round 6 after Bevan French was ruled out with injury. On 24 August 2017, Auva'a scored the fastest try in NRL history when he pounced on a loose pass from the kickoff against the Brisbane Broncos, the try was timed at 12.88 seconds This was later overtaken by James Fisher-Harris who scored for New Zealand after nine seconds in round 27 of the 2025 NRL season against Manly.

=== 2018 ===
Auva'a was included in Parramatta's starting lineup for the first six rounds of the season before suffering a rib injury against Canberra in Round 6 and was ruled out indefinitely. On 30 August, Auva'a announced his retirement from rugby league at the age of 26. Auva'a spoke to the media saying "My back has been bad for several years and even after surgery a couple of years ago, I’ve had problem after problem, I’m thinking about quality of life after football and it’s a tough call but I believe it to be the right one, I’ve only managed a handful of games this season and it has been tough".

== Controversies ==
=== 2014: Assault Charges ===
On 28 May 2014, Auva'a entered a guilty plea to charges of recklessly causing injury and criminal damage in Melbourne Magistrates Court after being arrested for a violent attack in the early hours of January 18. After drinking heavily at a wedding, he threw his ex-girlfriend against a garage wall and punched holes in the walls of her home. South Sydney fined him $2,000 and suspended him for 7 days. The magistrate, who described the incident as "devastating", deferred her decision for six months; Auva'a was bailed to return to court in November, when he was given a two-year good behaviour bond and a fine of $3,000. On 13 November 2014, Auva'a was handed a 9-month suspension by the NRL, ending with round 22 of the 2015 season, and ordered to complete a secondary prevention counselling program covering issues including violence against women, alcohol abuse and anger management. An attempt by Auva'a to have his suspension lifted early was denied by the NRL.

=== 2016: Drug Charges ===
On 13 July 2016, Auva’a was sacked by the Rabbitohs for a second breach of the NRL’s Testing Policy for illicit substances. Auva’a is the second Rabbitohs player this week to have his contract terminated after forward Paul Carter was let go on Tuesday for breaching the club’s code of conduct. While Auva’a, did not return a positive test for an illicit or hazardous substance in this instance, he contravened the rules as set out in the NRL Policy. Under the terms of the policy, the Rabbitohs had the right to terminate the troubled star’s contract for a second breach. In a statement released on Thursday afternoon, South Sydney said they would "continue to offer welfare assistance and support to Kirisome".
