= Kaysa Pritchard =

Samoa international rugby league footballer

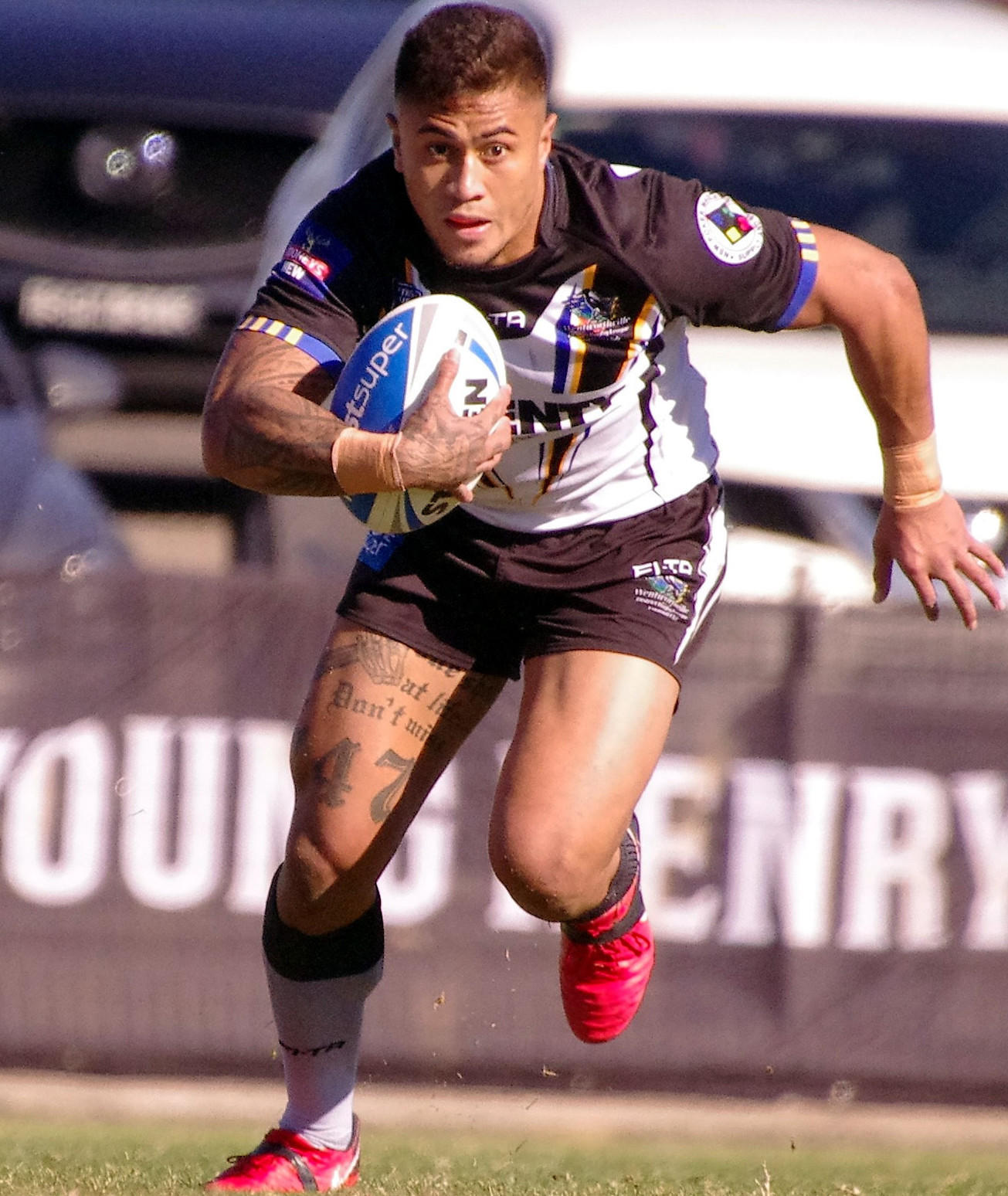

Personal information
- Born: 5 May 1994 (age 32) Campbelltown, New South Wales, Australia
- Height: 175 cm (5 ft 9 in)
- Weight: 88 kg (13 st 12 lb)

Playing information
- Position: Hooker
Club
Years	Team	Pld	T	G	FG	P
2013–19	Parramatta Eels	47	4	0	0	16
Representative
Years	Team	Pld	T	G	FG	P
2016–17	Samoa	3	0	0	0	0
- Source: As of 19 May 2019
- Relatives: Frank Pritchard (brother)

Kaysa Pritchard (born 5 May 1994) is a former Samoa international rugby league footballer who played as a hooker for the Parramatta Eels in the NRL.

== Background ==
Pritchard was born in Campbelltown, New South Wales, Australia. He is of Samoan and Pākehā (Anglo-Saxon) New Zealand descent.

He played his junior football for the Cabramatta Two Blues, and attended Hoxton Park High School before being signed by the Parramatta Eels.

Pritchard is the younger brother of retired Parramatta Eels player Frank Pritchard.

== Playing career ==
=== Early career ===
In 2012, Pritchard played for the Parramatta Eels' NYC team.

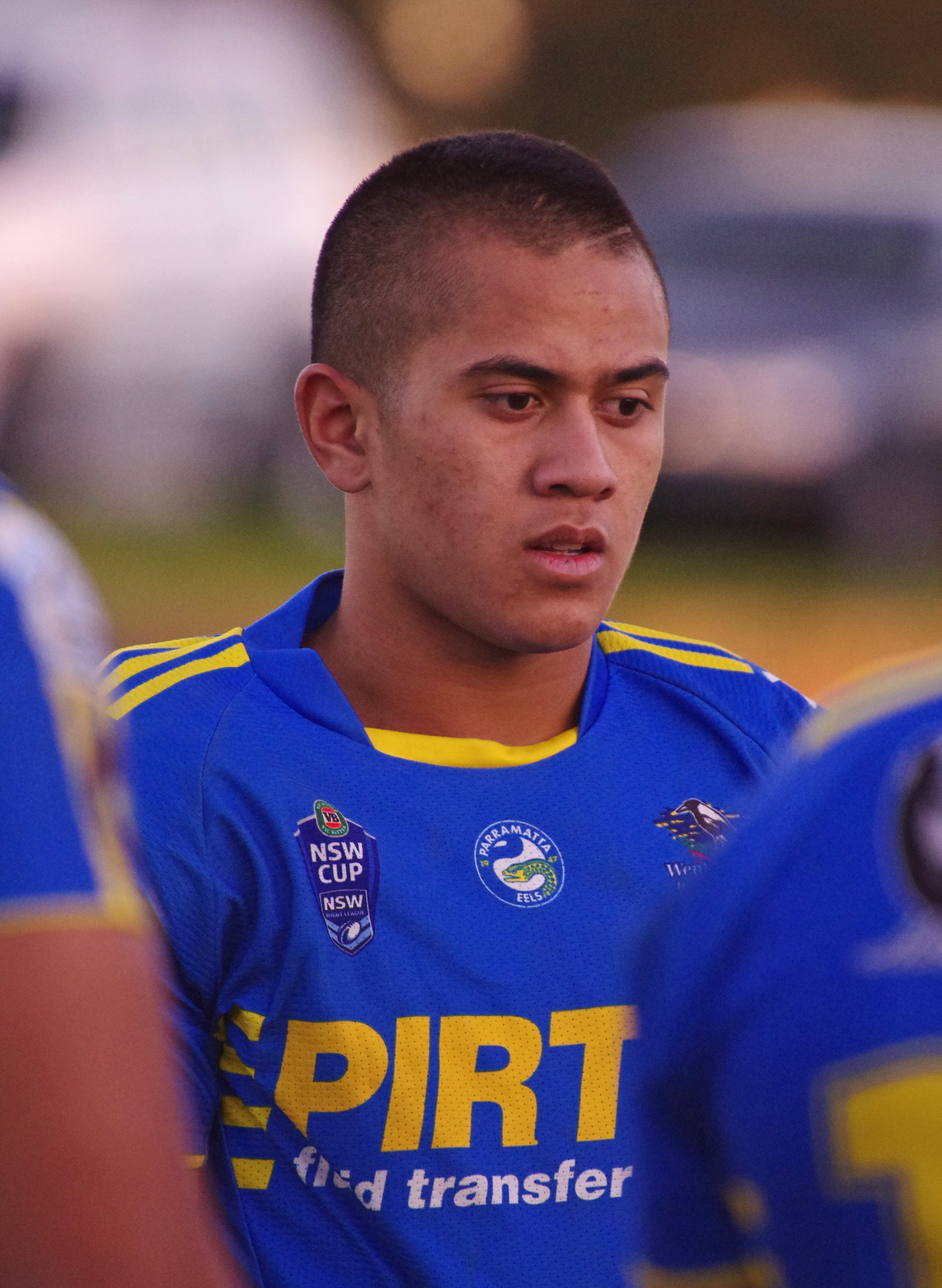
Pritchard in 2013

=== 2013 ===
In Round 8, Pritchard made his NRL debut for Parramatta against the North Queensland Cowboys. On 5 July, he re-signed with the Eels on a two-year contract.

=== 2014 ===
On 3 May, Pritchard played for the New South Wales Under-20s team against the Queensland Under-20s team. On 8 September, he was named in the Samoa train-on squad for the 2014 Four Nations, but didn't make the final 24-man squad.

=== 2015 ===
On 14 May 2015, it was revealed that Kaysa Pritchard let fellow Parramatta player Kenny Edwards take a urine sample for Pritchard on his behalf. Pritchard was temporarily stood down by the club. On 11 July, Pritchard re-signed with the Eels on a one-year contract.

=== 2016 ===
On 26 February, Pritchard re-signed with the Parramatta club on a two-year contract. On 7 May, he made his international debut for Samoa against Tonga in the 2016 Polynesian Cup. Later in the year he represented Samoa in their historical test match against Fiji in Apia.

=== 2017 ===
Pritchard started the 2017 season at hooker for Parramatta in round 1. He went on to play a further 15 games before suffering a season-ending knee injury against St. George. After being ruled out for the season, Pritchard made a shock return to the Parramatta side in their elimination final loss to North Queensland.

=== 2018 ===
On 29 April 2018, Pritchard was awarded the Anzac medal for being voted best player on ground in Parramatta's 24–22 victory over the Wests Tigers. In Round 10, Pritchard suffered a groin injury in the match against Canterbury and was ruled out for 3–4 weeks. On 19 July, Pritchard scored a try in Parramatta's 14–8 victory over arch rivals Canterbury in which the media dubbed the match the "spoon bowl" as both sides were sitting last and second last on the table. On 28 July, Pritchard was ruled out for the rest of the season after suffering a dislocated shoulder in Parramatta's 26–20 loss to South Sydney. In total, Pritchard only managed to feature in 8 games for Parramatta in season 2018 as the club endured a horror year on and off the field claiming its 14th wooden spoon and Pritchard's second wooden spoon as a player since he joined the Eels in 2013. On 30 October 2018, Pritchard signed a one-year contract extension to stay at Parramatta until the end of the 2019 season.

=== 2019 ===
In February, Pritchard was granted indefinite leave by Parramatta after the player declared that he was struggling to recover from an ongoing injury suffered from the 2018 season.

On 14 June, Pritchard announced his retirement as a player.
