= List of Indigenous All Stars players =

This article lists all rugby league footballers who have represented the Indigenous All Stars in the annual All Stars Match against the NRL All Stars. Players are listed according to the date of their debut game.

== List of players ==
Playing statistics are correct as of 2019.

Cap No.	Name	Debut Year	Affiliation	Appearances	Tries	Goals	Field goals	Points
1.	Preston Campbell	2010	Dunghutti, Nucoorilma people of Kamilaroi, and Gumbyr	1	0	0	0	0
2.	Nathan Merritt	2010	Wiradjuri	3	3	0	0	12
3.	Ty Williams	2010		1	0	0	0	0
4.	Beau Champion	2010	Dunghutti	2	0	0	0	0
5.	Wendell Sailor	2010		1	1	0	0	4
6.	Scott Prince	2010	Kalkadoon	4	0	2	0	4
7.	Johnathan Thurston	2010	Gunggari	6	1	17	0	38
8.	George Rose	2010	Kamilaroi	5	0	0	0	0
9.	Ben Jones	2010		1	1	0	0	4
10.	Carl Webb	2010		2	0	0	0	0
11.	Cory Paterson	2010		3	0	0	0	0
12.	Tom Learoyd-Lahrs	2010		3	0	0	0	0
13.	Sam Thaiday	2010	Yam Island (Torres Strait)	3	0	0	0	0
14.	Jamie Soward	2010	Wiradjuri	3	1	0	0	4
15.	Yileen Gordon	2010		1	0	0	0	0
16.	Greg Bird	2010	Kamilaroi	5	0	0	0	0
17.	Jharal Yow Yeh	2010	Margany	3	1	0	0	4
18.	Travis Waddell	2010	Badu Island (Torres Strait)	4	0	0	0	0
19.	Joel Thompson	2010	Ngiyampaa and Wiradjuri	6	0	0	0	0
20.	Blake Ferguson	2010	Wiradjuri and Pitta Pitta	4	2	0	0	8
21.	Willie Tonga	2011	Wiradjuri	1	0	0	0	0
22.	Jamal Idris	2011	Worimi	2	0	0	0	0
23.	Ben Barba	2011	Goreng Goreng	5	4	0	0	16
24.	Ryan James	2011	Bundjalung	5	0	0	0	0
25.	Joel Moon	2011		1	0	0	0	0
26.	Matt Bowen	2011	Binthi and Dhaarrba	2	1	0	0	4
27.	Anthony Mitchell	2011	Wakka Wakka	2	0	0	0	0
28.	Greg Inglis	2012	Dunghutti	5	2	0	0	8
29.	Justin Hodges	2012		3	0	0	0	0
30.	Chris Sandow	2012	Bigambul and Gubbi Gubbi	1	0	1	0	2
31.	Andrew Fifita	2012	Wiradjuri	5	0	0	0	0
32.	Nathan Peats	2012	Biripi	4	0	0	0	0
33.	Reece Robinson	2013		1	3	0	0	12
34.	Aidan Sezer	2013	Wiradjuri	2	0	1	0	2
35.	Joel Romelo	2013		1	0	0	0	0
36.	Jake Foster	2013		1	0	0	0	0
37.	Dane Nielsen	2013		1	0	0	0	0
38.	Timana Tahu	2013		1	0	0	0	0
39.	Jack Wighton	2013	Wiradjuri	4	0	0	0	0
40.	Alex Johnston	2015	Saibai Island (Torres Strait)	2	0	0	0	0
41.	Will Chambers	2015		3	1	0	0	4
42.	Josh Hoffman	2015	Torres Strait	1	0	0	0	0
43.	Ray Thompson	2015		1	0	0	0	0
44.	Tyrone Peachey	2015	Wiradjuri	4	0	0	0	0
45.	Dane Gagai	2015	Yam Island and Badu Island (Torres Strait)	3	2	0	0	8
46.	Kyle Turner	2015		2	0	0	0	0
47.	Kierran Moseley	2015	Kalkadoon, Mitakoodi, and Tittatitta	1	0	0	0	0
48.	Brad Tighe	2015	Kamilaroi	1	0	0	0	0
49.	Tyrone Roberts	2015	Bundjalung	4	0	0	0	0
50.	Chris Grevsmuhl	2015	Gugu Badhun	1	1	0	0	4
51.	David Fifita (b.1989)	2015	Wiradjuri	2	0	0	0	0
52.	Tyson Andrews	2015		1	0	0	0	0
53.	Edrick Lee	2016	Badu Island and Moa Island (Torres Strait)	1	0	0	0	0
54.	James Roberts	2016	Bundjalung, Dunghutti, and Worimi	2	0	0	0	0
55.	Craig Garvey	2016		2	0	0	0	0
56.	Wade Graham	2016	Bundjalung	2	0	0	0	0
57.	Leilani Latu	2016		3	2	0	0	8
58.	Will Smith	2016	Gumbaynggirr and Wonnarua	1	0	0	0	0
59.	Jack Bird	2017	Yuin	1	1	0	0	4
60.	Ashley Taylor	2017	Mandandanji and Yuwaalaraay	1	1	0	0	4
61.	Latrell Mitchell	2017	Biripi, Wiradjuri and Worimi	2	0	3	0	6
62.	Bevan French	2017		2	1	0	0	4
63.	Chris Smith	2017	Arrernte	2	0	0	0	0
64.	Josh Addo-Carr	2019	Gunggandji people of Yarrabah, Wiradjuri and Gadigal	1	2	0	0	8
65.	Cody Walker	2019	Bundjalung and Yuin	1	1	0	0	4
66.	David Fifita (b.2000)	2019	Badu Island (Torres Strait)	1	1	0	0	4
67.	Adam Elliott	2019	Wiradjuri	1	0	0	0	0
68.	Jesse Ramien	2019	Wailwan and Wiradjuri	1	1	0	0	4
69.	Kotoni Staggs	2019	Wiradjuri	1	0	0	0	0
70.	Josh Kerr	2019	Quandamooka	1	1	0	0	4
71.	Tyrell Fuimaono	2020	Wiradjuri					
72.	Connor Watson	2020	Kamilaroi					
73.	Joshua Curran	2020	Dharug					
74.	Jamayne Taunoa-Brown	2020	Kaurna and Narungga					
75.	Zac Saddler	2020	Wiradjuri					
76.	Jamal Fogarty	2021	Bundjalung					
77.	Reuben Cotter	2021	Boigu Island and Darnley Island (Torres Strait)					
78.	Cade Cust	2021	Gulidjan					
79.	Brian Kelly	2021	Bundjalung					
80.	Corey Thompson	2021	Yuggera					

== See also ==
- List of NRL All Stars/World All Stars players
