= Jack Bird =

Australian rugby league footballer

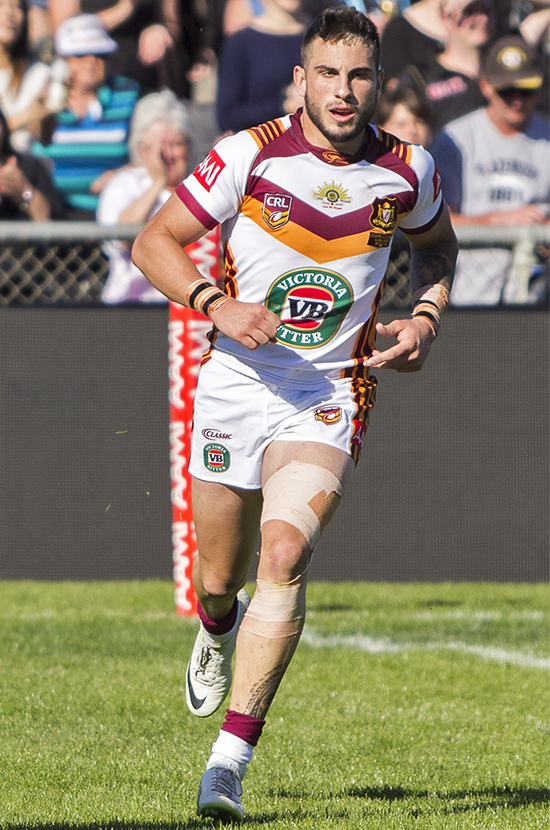

Personal information
- Born: 20 March 1995 (age 31) Wollongong, New South Wales, Australia
- Height: 6 ft 0 in (1.83 m)
- Weight: 15 st 2 lb (96 kg)

Playing information
- Position: Centre, Second-row, Stand-off, Loose forward
Club
Years	Team	Pld	T	G	FG	P
2015–17	Cronulla Sharks	66	17	0	0	68
2018–19	Brisbane Broncos	17	2	0	0	8
2021–24	St. George Illawarra	73	17	8	0	84
2025–26	Wests Tigers	17	0	0	0	0
2026–	Leeds Rhinos	14	3	0	0	12
	Total	187	39	8	0	172
Representative
Years	Team	Pld	T	G	FG	P
2015–16	NSW Country	2	0	0	0	0
2016–17	New South Wales	5	0	0	0	0
2017	Indigenous All Stars	1	1	0	0	4
2017	Prime Minister's XIII	1	0	0	0	0
- Source: As of 29 August 2026

Jack Bird (born 20 March 1995) is an Australian professional rugby league footballer who plays as a second-row forward and centre for the Leeds Rhinos in the Betfred Super League.

Bird previously played in the National Rugby League for the Wests Tigers, Brisbane Broncos, St. George Illawarra Dragons and Cronulla-Sutherland Sharks where he won the 2016 NRL Grand Final. He is a New South Wales State of Origin, Country Origin, Prime Minister's XIII and Indigenous All Stars representative. Bird has also played as a loose forward in the NRL, as well as playing as a stand-off earlier in his career.

== Background ==
Bird was born in Wollongong, New South Wales, Australia, and is of Indigenous Australian descent.

Bird played his junior rugby league for the Berkeley Eagles, before being signed by the St George Illawarra Dragons.

== Playing career ==
=== Early career ===
In 2013 and 2014, Bird played for the St. George Illawarra Dragons' NYC team playing 37 games and scoring 15 tries for 60 points.

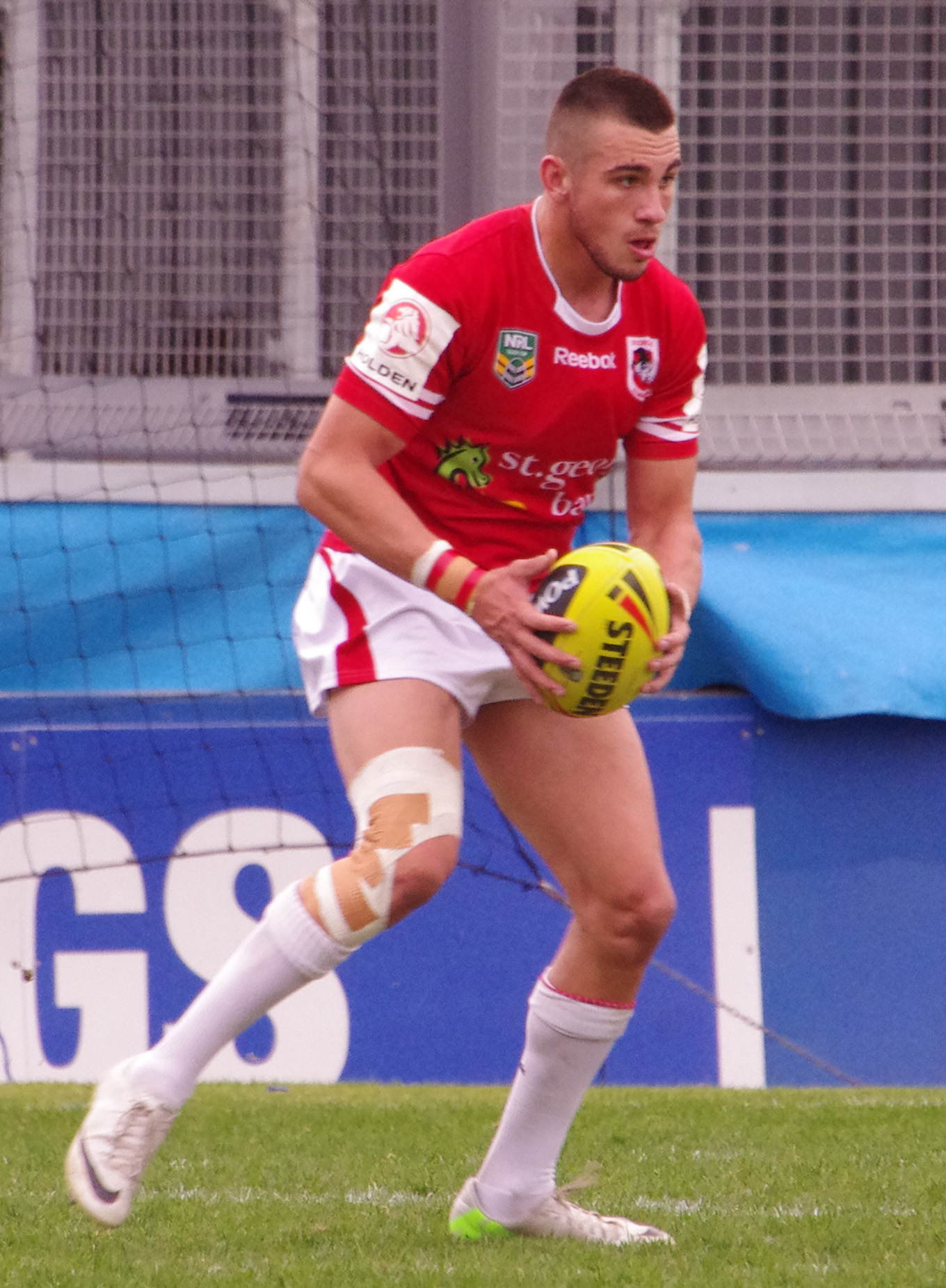
Bird playing for the Dragons in 2013

On 3 May 2014, Bird played for the New South Wales under-20s team against the Queensland under-20s team, playing at lock in the 30–8 win at Penrith Stadium.

On 18 September 2014 Bird signed a two-year contract with the Cronulla-Sutherland Sharks starting in 2015.

On 18 October 2014, Bird played for the Junior Kangaroos against the Junior Kiwis, playing at centre in the 15–14 loss at Mt Smart Stadium.

=== 2015 ===
On 31 January and 1 February 2015, Bird played for Cronulla-Sutherland in the 2015 NRL Auckland Nines.

In round 4 of the 2015 NRL season, Bird made his NRL debut for the Cronulla-Sutherland Sharks against the Gold Coast Titans, playing off the interchange bench in Cronulla's 24–22 loss at Shark Park. In his next match in round 5 against the Sydney Roosters, Bird played at five-eighth for Cronulla-Sutherland in the absence of regular five-eighth Ben Barba. Bird scored two tries and set up another in the Sharks' 20–12 upset win over the 2013 premiers, causing him to be selected again at five-eighth the next week ahead of Barba who was named on the interchange bench.

On 3 May 2015, Bird played for New South Wales Country against New South Wales City in the 2015 City vs Country Origin match, playing at halfback in Country's 34–22 win at Wagga Wagga.

On 28 September 2015, at the 2015 Dally M Awards night, Bird was named the Dally M Rookie of the Year after playing in 23 matches and scoring 8 tries for Cronulla.

=== 2016 ===
On 15 January 2016, Bird re-signed with Cronulla-Sutherland on a one-year contract.

In February 2016, Bird played for the Sharks in the 2016 NRL Auckland Nines.

On 8 May 2016, Bird played for Country Origin against City Origin, where he played at halfback in the 44–30 loss in Tamworth.

On 22 June 2016, Bird made his representative debut for New South Wales in Game 2 of the 2016 State of Origin series, where he filled the void on the interchange bench for Dylan Walker who shifted to centre in the 26–16 loss at Suncorp Stadium. Bird also played in Game 3, where he again played off interchange bench in the Blues 18–14 win at ANZ Stadium.

On 2 October 2016, in Cronulla's 2016 NRL Grand Final against the Melbourne Storm, Bird played at centre and bravely played the majority of the match with an elbow injury in the historic 14–12 victory. Bird finished his successful 2016 NRL season with him playing in 26 matches and scoring 6 tries for Cronulla-Sutherland.

=== 2017 ===
In February 2017, Bird was selected in the Sharks 2017 NRL Auckland Nines squad.

On 10 February 2017, Bird played for the Indigenous All Stars against the World All Stars in the 2017 All Stars match, starting at centre and scoring a try in the 34–8 win at Hunter Stadium.

On 13 April 2017, it was announced that Bird signed a lucrative four-year deal, worth $4 million with the Brisbane Broncos starting in 2018.

For the 2017 State of Origin series, Bird played in all 3 matches off the interchange bench for the Blues in their 2–1 series loss.

Bird finished his last year with Cronulla-Sutherland Sharks with him playing in 17 matches and scoring 3 tries in the 2017 NRL season.

On 23 September 2017, Bird played for Prime Minister's XIII against Papua New Guinea, starting at five-eighth in the 48–8 win in Port Moresby.

=== 2018 ===
When Bird arrived in Brisbane he had an existing shoulder injury that he suffered at the end of the 2017 season and Broncos coach Wayne Bennett claimed that the Sharks did not disclose the full extent of his injury before his move, the Broncos were only aware of his injury by Bird himself and that he needed surgery that would've ruled him out for till at least Round 4. In round 3 of the 2018 NRL season, Bird made his club debut for Brisbane earlier than expected against the Wests Tigers, playing at centre in the gritty 9–7 win at Campbelltown Stadium.

After the match Bird was heavily criticised by NRL fans for looking overweight, Bird commenting, "I don't really care what they think to be honest", "I'm happy with my weight, I feel good, "I do have to lose some body fat but it comes with time, being injured doesn't help, "Give me time and hopefully I can slim down a little bit but I'm feeling healthy." In round 10 against the Manly-Warringah Sea Eagles, Bird succumbed to the sternum injury that has plagued him for nine months and end his season early during Brisbane's 38–24 loss at Suncorp Stadium. Bird would have a horror 2018 NRL season, only playing in 8 matches for the Broncos because of his shoulder and sternum injuries were still ongoing during the year.

=== 2019 ===
Bird made his return for Brisbane in the 2019 season opening round 1 match against the Melbourne Storm, playing at centre in the 22–12 loss at AAMI Park. Following the match, Bird was receiving negative feedback on social media about his performance despite it was his first match back since round 10 of the previous season, fans were quick to judge his performance based on an early error, and he finished with 127 running metres, three tackle-breaks and 11 tackles. During the first half, Bird was hit hard by Storm winger Suliasi Vunivalu and coughed up the ball for Curtis Scott to race away and score for Melbourne. In Round 3 against the St George Illawarra Dragons, Bird scored his first club try for the Broncos in the heartbreaking last second 25–24 loss at Suncorp Stadium.

During the early rounds, Bird would slowly recapture his good form that he showed at Cronulla but in round 9, Bird suffered a season-ending anterior cruciate ligament knee injury during the Broncos 26–10 win at Suncorp Stadium. Bird's 2019 NRL season was cut short, finishing with 9 matches and scoring 2 tries for Brisbane.

=== 2020 ===
On 11 March, Bird was ruled out for the entire 2020 NRL season after suffering an ACL injury at pre-season training. Bird took to Instagram saying "People who know me know how hard I have worked to get to the stage I was at leading into this season, and with that, I'm truly heartbroken that I have to start this process all over again".

On 6 November, St. George Illawarra confirmed that Bird had signed a two-year contract with the club after he was permitted by Brisbane to negotiate with rival clubs.

=== 2021 ===
Bird made his debut for his junior club St. George Illawarra in round 1 of the 2021 NRL season which saw the club lose 32–18 against rivals Cronulla-Sutherland.

Bird played a total of 22 matches for St. George Illawarra as the club finished 11th on the table and missed out on the finals.

=== 2022 ===
In round 23 of the 2022 NRL season, Bird scored two tries for St. George Illawarra in a 46–26 victory over the Gold Coast. In round 24, Bird was sin binned for dissent in the clubs 24–22 victory over the Wests Tigers. Bird played 23 games for St. George Illawarra in the 2022 NRL season as the club finished 10th on the table and missed the finals.

=== 2023 ===
On 10 May, Bird came under criticism for comments he made at fans during an interview regarding the club's poor form and planned protests from St. George Illawarra supporters with Bird saying "They've got a lot to say about people on the field. I don't think they've ever played a game of footy, they don't much about the game, I'm speaking from first-hand stuff that I've copped. I feel sorry for 'Hook' (Griffin). It's us out there playing so we should be the ones to blame, Fans are good for the game and stuff like that, but it comes to a point where you can't cop so much criticism over the players and coaching staff". The following day, Bird was forced to apologise for his comments.

In Round 13, Bird was awarded an illegal try on the seventh tackle of a set in the St. George Illawarra Dragons 12–26 loss to the Dolphins at Kayo Stadium; the decision would not have been overturned even if the Dolphins had lost the game. Bird would play a total of 14 games for the club in the 2023 NRL season as they finished 16th on the table.

=== 2024 ===
In round 12 of the 2024 NRL season, Bird was taken from the field on a stretcher in what appeared to be a serious ankle injury in the clubs 44–12 loss against Canterbury. On 9 September, Bird signed a two-year deal to join the Wests Tigers starting in the 2025 NRL season.

=== 2025 ===
In round 1 of the 2025 NRL season, Bird made his club debut for the Wests Tigers against Newcastle.

On 16 August, it was announced that Bird had been given permission by Wests to negotiate with other clubs ahead of the 2026 season.

Bird played a total of 17 games for the Wests Tigers in the 2025 NRL season as the club finished 13th on the table.

=== 2026 ===
Bird began the 2026 NRL season training with the Wests Tigers, before joining the Leeds Rhinos on a two-year deal on 19 February 2026.

=== Statistics ===
Season	Team	Pld	T	G	FG	P
2015	Cronulla-Sutherland Sharks	23	8	-	-	32
2016	Cronulla-Sutherland Sharks	26	6	-	-	24
2017	Cronulla-Sutherland Sharks	17	3	-	-	12
2018	Brisbane Broncos	8	-	-	-	0
2019	Brisbane Broncos	9	2	-	-	8
2021	St. George Illawarra Dragons	22	4	6	-	28
2022	St. George Illawarra Dragons	23	7	1	-	30
2023	St. George Illawarra Dragons	14	2	1	-	10
2024	St. George Illawarra Dragons	14	4	0	-	10
2025	Wests Tigers	17	0	0	0	0
2026*	Leeds Rhinos	4	3	0	0	12
	Totals	173	36	8	0	160

*denotes season still competing

== Controversy ==
On 5 July 2021, Bird was fined $25,000 by the NRL and suspended for one game after breaching the game's COVID-19 biosecurity protocols when he attended a party along with 12 other St. George Illawarra players at Paul Vaughan's property.
