= List of NRL All Stars/World All Stars players =

This article lists all rugby league footballers who have represented the NRL All Stars/World All Stars in the annual All Stars Match against the Indigenous All Stars. Players are listed according to the date of their debut game.

== List of players ==
Cap No.	Name	Debut Year	Club	Appearances	Tries	Goals	Field goals	Points
1.	Darren Lockyer	2010	Brisbane Broncos	2	0	0	0	0
2.	Brett Finch	2010	Melbourne Storm	1	0	0	0	0
3.	Israel Folau	2010	Brisbane Broncos	1	0	0	0	0
4.	Michael Jennings	2010	Penrith Panthers	3	1	0	0	4
5.	Matt Cooper	2010	St. George Illawarra Dragons	1	0	0	0	0
6.	Manu Vatuvei	2010	New Zealand Warriors	3	1	0	0	4
7.	Benji Marshall	2010	Wests Tigers	4	1	8	0	20
8.	Adam Blair	2010	Melbourne Storm	2	0	0	0	0
9.	Cameron Smith	2010	Melbourne Storm	4	0	1	0	2
10.	Sam Burgess	2010	South Sydney Rabbitohs	1	0	0	0	0
11.	Anthony Watmough	2010	Manly Warringah Sea Eagles	2	0	0	0	0
12.	David Shillington	2010	Canberra Raiders	2	0	0	0	0
13.	Luke O'Donnell	2010	North Queensland Cowboys	1	0	0	0	0
14.	Kurt Gidley	2010	Newcastle Knights	2	0	1	0	2
15.	Anthony Tupou	2010	Cronulla-Sutherland Sharks	1	0	0	0	0
16.	Nate Myles	2010	Sydney Roosters	1	0	0	0	0
17.	Robbie Farah	2010	Wests Tigers	2	0	0	0	0
18.	Luke Bailey	2010	Gold Coast Titans	2	1	0	0	4
19.	Josh Morris	2010	Canterbury-Bankstown Bulldogs	3	1	0	0	4
20.	Jarryd Hayne	2010	Parramatta Eels	2	1	0	0	4
21.	Josh Dugan	2011	Canberra Raiders	2	2	0	0	8
22.	Akuila Uate	2011	Newcastle Knights	3	1	0	0	4
23.	Jamie Lyon	2011	Manly Warringah Sea Eagles	1	0	0	0	0
24.	Brett Morris	2011	St. George Illawarra Dragons	2	1	0	0	4
25.	Ben Hannant	2011	Brisbane Broncos	2	0	0	0	0
26.	Matthew Scott	2011	North Queensland Cowboys	1	0	0	0	0
27.	Nathan Hindmarsh	2011	Parramatta Eels	2	0	0	0	0
28.	Liam Fulton	2011	Wests Tigers	1	0	0	0	0
29.	Paul Gallen	2011	Cronulla-Sutherland Sharks	3	1	0	0	4
30.	David Taylor	2011	South Sydney Rabbitohs	3	0	0	0	0
31.	Ashley Harrison	2011	Gold Coast Titans	2	0	0	0	0
32.	Feleti Mateo	2011	New Zealand Warriors	2	0	0	0	0
33.	Shaun Kenny-Dowall	2011	Sydney Roosters	2	1	0	0	4
34.	Michael Ennis	2011	Canterbury-Bankstown Bulldogs	2	0	0	0	0
35.	Petero Civoniceva	2011	Penrith Panthers	1	0	0	0	0
36.	Jason Nightingale	2012	St. George Illawarra Dragons	1	0	0	0	0
37.	Jack Reed	2012	Brisbane Broncos	1	1	0	0	4
38.	Cooper Cronk	2012	Melbourne Storm	1	0	0	0	0
39.	Kade Snowden	2012	Newcastle Knights	1	0	0	0	0
40.	Frank Pritchard	2012	Canterbury-Bankstown Bulldogs	1	1	0	0	4
41.	Jared Waerea-Hargreaves	2012	Sydney Roosters	2	0	0	0	0
42.	Tony Williams^{1}	2012	Manly Warringah Sea Eagles	0	0	0	0	0
43.	Brent Tate	2012	North Queensland Cowboys	1	0	0	0	0
44.	Aaron Payne	2012	North Queensland Cowboys	1	0	0	0	0
45.	Luke Lewis	2012	Penrith Panthers	1	1	0	0	4
46.	Nathan Fien	2012	St. George Illawarra Dragons	1	0	0	0	0
47.	Justin O'Neill	2013	Melbourne Storm	1	0	0	0	0
48.	Adam Reynolds	2013	South Sydney Rabbitohs	2	0	3	0	6
49.	James Tamou	2013	North Queensland Cowboys	1	0	0	0	0
50.	Tim Grant	2013	Penrith Panthers	1	0	0	0	0
51.	Willie Mason	2013	Newcastle Knights	1	0	0	0	0
52.	Shaun Johnson	2013	New Zealand Warriors	1	0	0	0	0
53.	Kieran Foran	2013	Manly Warringah Sea Eagles	2	0	0	0	0
54.	Chris Heighington	2013	Cronulla-Sutherland Sharks	1	0	0	0	0
55.	Matt Moylan	2015	Penrith Panthers	1	0	0	0	0
56.	Jarrod Croker	2015	Canberra Raiders	3	0	1	0	2
57.	Dylan Walker	2015	South Sydney Rabbitohs	1	1	0	0	4
58.	Antonio Winterstein	2015	North Queensland Cowboys	1	0	0	0	0
59.	Mitchell Pearce	2015	Sydney Roosters	1	0	0	0	0
60.	James Graham	2015	Canterbury-Bankstown Bulldogs	2	0	0	0	0
61.	Beau Scott	2015	Newcastle Knights	2	0	0	0	0
62.	Jason Taumalolo	2015	North Queensland Cowboys	1	0	0	0	0
63.	Jesse Bromwich	2015	Melbourne Storm	1	0	0	0	0
64.	Luke Brooks	2015	Wests Tigers	1	0	0	0	0
65.	Joseph Paulo	2015	Parramatta Eels	1	0	0	0	0
66.	Trent Merrin	2015	St. George Illawarra Dragons	2	0	0	0	0
67.	Corey Parker	2015	Brisbane Broncos	1	0	0	0	0
68.	Jeremy Smith	2015	Newcastle Knights	2	0	0	0	0
69.	Nathan Friend	2015	New Zealand Warriors	1	0	0	0	0
World All Stars^{2}								
70.	Jordan Kahu	2016	Brisbane Broncos	1	0	0	0	0
71.	Semi Radradra	2016	Parramatta Eels	1	1	0	0	4
72.	Nene Macdonald	2016	Gold Coast Titans	2	1	0	0	4
73.	Gareth Widdop	2016	St. George Illawarra Dragons	1	0	0	0	0
74.	Tom Burgess	2016	South Sydney Rabbitohs	1	0	0	0	0
75.	Ryan Hoffman	2016	New Zealand Warriors	1	0	0	0	0
76.	Kane Evans	2016	Sydney Roosters	1	0	0	0	0
77.	Konrad Hurrell	2016	New Zealand Warriors	1	1	0	0	4
78.	Martin Taupau	2016	Manly Warringah Sea Eagles	1	0	0	0	0
79.	Matthew Wright	2016	North Queensland Cowboys	1	0	0	0	0
80.	David Mead	2017	Brisbane Broncos	1	1	0	0	4
81.	Gerard Beale	2017	Cronulla-Sutherland Sharks	1	0	0	0	0
82.	Mitchell Moses	2017	Wests Tigers	1	0	0	0	0
83.	Moses Mbye	2017	Canterbury-Bankstown Bulldogs	1	0	0	0	0
84.	Jordan McLean	2017	Melbourne Storm	1	0	0	0	0
85.	Jake Friend	2017	Sydney Roosters	1	0	0	0	0
86.	Reagan Campbell-Gillard	2017	Penrith Panthers	1	0	0	0	0
87.	Gavin Cooper	2017	North Queensland Cowboys	1	0	0	0	0
88.	Bryce Cartwright	2017	Penrith Panthers	1	0	0	0	0
89.	Tepai Moeroa	2017	Parramatta Eels	1	0	0	0	0
90.	Damien Cook	2017	South Sydney Rabbitohs	1	0	0	0	0
91.	Paul Vaughan	2017	St. George Illawarra Dragons	1	0	0	0	0
92.	Sam Lisone	2017	New Zealand Warriors	1	0	0	0	0
93.	Mitchell Aubusson	2017	Sydney Roosters	1	0	0	0	0
94.	Sione Mata'utia	2017	Newcastle Knights	1	0	0	0	0
95.	Jordan Turner	2017	Canberra Raiders	1	0	0	0	0
96.	Chris McQueen	2017	Gold Coast Titans	1	0	0	0	0

- ^{1} – Tony Williams was capped despite never playing a game for the NRL All Stars.
- ^{2} – In 2016, the NRL All Stars team changed to the World All Stars.

== See also ==
- List of Indigenous All Stars players
