= Dylan Napa =

Cook Islands international rugby league footballer

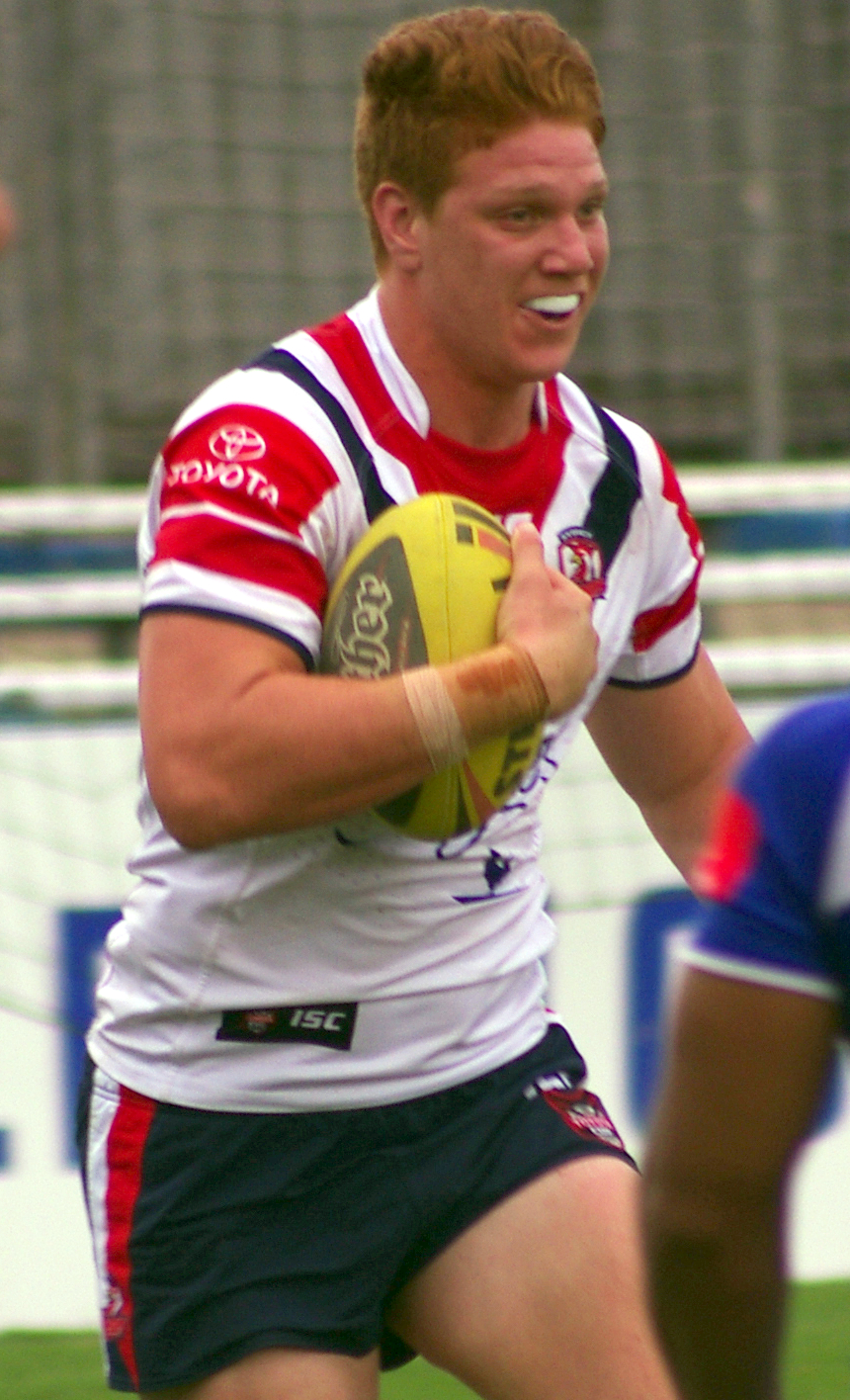

Personal information
- Born: 13 November 1992 (age 34) Brisbane, Queensland, Australia
- Height: 6 ft 10 in (208 cm)
- Weight: 17 st 13 lb (114 kg)

Playing information
- Position: Prop
Club
Years	Team	Pld	T	G	FG	P
2013–18	Sydney Roosters	122	2	0	0	8
2019–21	Canterbury Bulldogs	54	4	0	0	16
2022	Catalans Dragons	20	0	0	0	0
2023	Sydney Roosters	2	0	0	0	0
	Total	198	6	0	0	24
Representative
Years	Team	Pld	T	G	FG	P
2013–	Cook Islands	4	0	0	0	0
2014–16	Prime Minister's XIII	2	0	0	0	0
2017–19	Queensland	7	0	0	0	0
- Source: As of 28 September 2024

Dylan Napa (born 13 November 1992) is a Cook Islands international rugby league footballer who plays as a prop for the Glebe Dirty Reds in the Ron Massey Cup. Napa has previously played for the Canterbury Bankstown Bulldogs and had a previous stint with the Sydney Roosters in the National Rugby League (NRL), where he won the 2018 NRL Premiership. He also played for the Catalans Dragons in the Super League. Through ancestry, he made three appearances for the Cook Islands in 2013. He has also played at representative level for the Prime Minister's XIII and for Queensland in the State of Origin series.

== Early years ==
Napa was born in Brisbane, Queensland, Australia, the son of a Cook Islands-born father and an Australian mother.

He attended St Patrick's College, Shorncliffe, and then went on to play junior football for the Brighton Roosters, North St Joeys, Aspley Devils, the Brisbane Brothers before being signed by the Sydney Roosters. Napa played for the Roosters NYC team in 2011 and 2012. Napa was named as a prop in the inaugural under 20s State of Origin match for Queensland in 2012. At the end of 2012, Napa was named on the interchange bench in the under 20s team of the year.

Napa cites Karmichael Hunt and Sonny Bill Williams as two inspirations for his playing style while growing up.

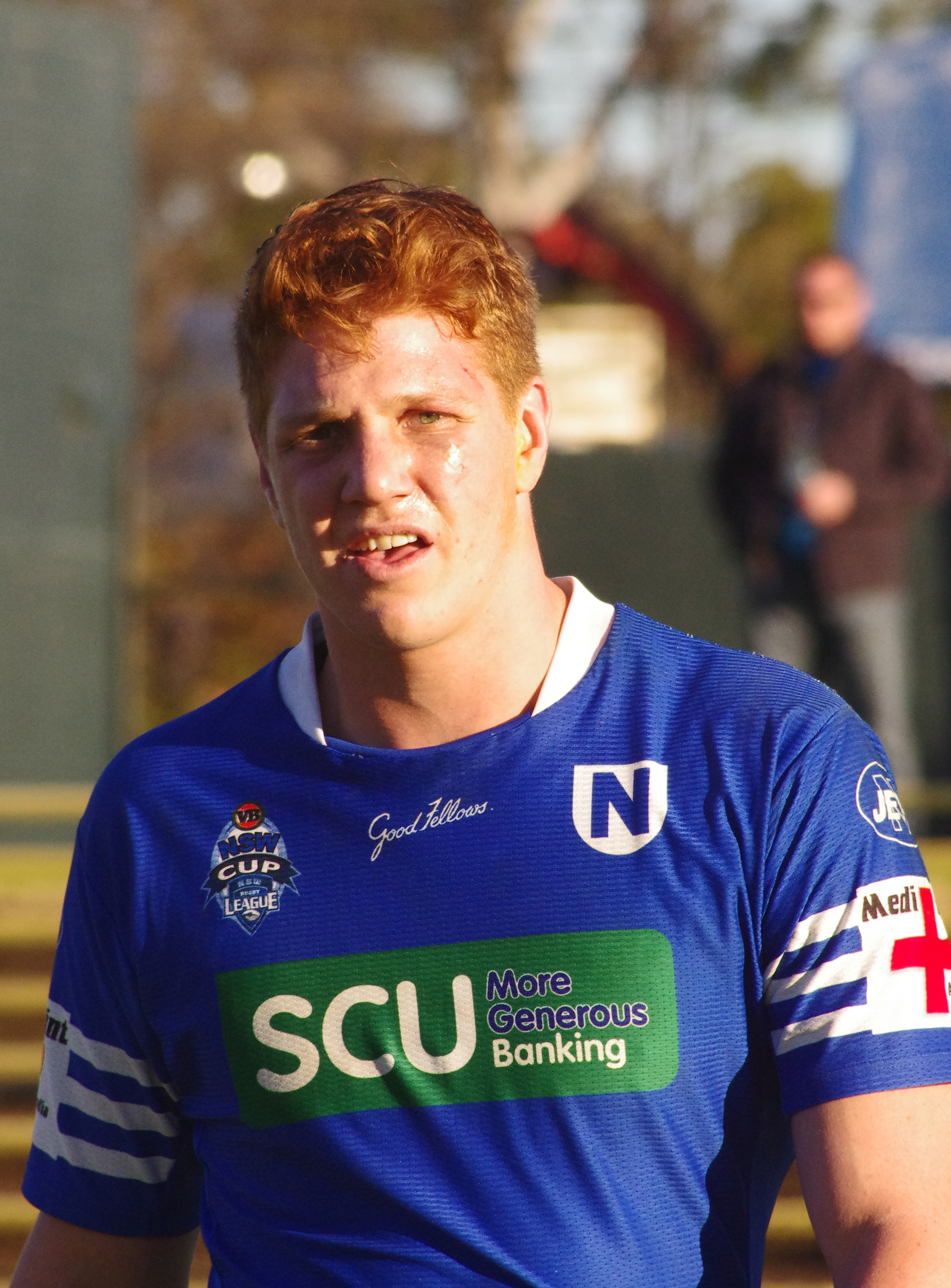
Napa playing for the Newtown Jets in 2012

== Playing career ==
=== 2013 ===
In Round 15 of the 2013 NRL season, Napa made his NRL debut for the Sydney Roosters against the Canterbury-Bankstown Bulldogs, playing off the interchange bench in the Roosters 20–18 win at ANZ Stadium. In his third match in round 24 against Cronulla, Napa put on one of the biggest hits of the year on Cronulla captain Paul Gallen in the Sydney Roosters 32–22 loss at Shark Park. Napa played in 7 matches for the Roosters in his debut year in the NRL in the 2013 NRL season, missing out on a grand final spot due to Luke O'Donnell recovering from injury. At the end of the season, Napa played in all three matches for the Cook Islands at the 2013 World Cup. On 30 October 2013, Napa made his Cook Islands international debut against the United States in the 32–20 loss at Memorial Stadium.

=== 2014 ===
On 22 February 2014, Napa played for the Roosters in their 2014 World Club Challenge match against Super League champions, the Wigan Warriors, playing off the interchange bench in the 36–14 victory at Sydney Football Stadium. Napa played in 24 matches for the Roosters in the 2014 NRL season. On 12 October 2014, Napa played for Prime Minister’s XIII against Papua New Guinea, playing off the interchange bench in the 34–18 win at Kokopo.

=== 2015 ===
In January, Napa was a member of the newly established QAS emerging Maroons squad. In January 2015, Napa was selected in the Roosters 2015 Auckland Nines squad. In Round 2 against cross-city rivals the South Sydney Rabbitohs, Napa scored his first NRL career try in the Roosters 34–26 loss at ANZ Stadium. On 22 March 2015, Napa re-signed with the Roosters until the end of the 2017 season. Napa was included in the Queensland squad for the 2015 State of Origin series, being named as 18th man in Game 1 and Game 3. Napa finished the 2015 NRL season playing in all 27 matches and scoring 1 try for the Roosters.

=== 2016 ===
On 12 January 2016, Napa was again selected in the QAS emerging Maroons squad. On 5 February 2016, Napa was one of eight players from the Maroons emerging camp who was banned from representing Queensland for 12-months after breaking curfew in Brisbane. In Round 6 against the South Sydney Rabbitohs in the Roosters 17–10 win at ANZ Stadium, Napa earned the man of the match honours after he had scored a try, completed 40 tackles and made 151 metres from 19 runs. Napa finished off the 2016 NRL season with him playing in 23 matches and scoring one try for the Roosters. On 24 September 2014, Napa played for Prime Minister’s XIII against Papua New Guinea, playing off the interchange bench in the 58–0 win at Kokopo.

=== 2017 ===
On 17 January 2017, Napa extended his contract with the Roosters to the end of the 2019 season. After showing good form in the early rounds, Napa was selected for the Queensland Maroons squad for the 2017 State of Origin series. On 31 May 2017, Napa made his Queensland representative debut against New South Wales, starting at prop in the Maroons woeful 28–4 loss at Suncorp Stadium. Napa would start at prop in the next 2 matches as the Maroons won the series 2–1. Napa finished the 2017 NRL season with him playing in 21 matches for the Roosters.

=== 2018 ===
In Round 11 against the Brisbane Broncos, Napa was sin-binned in the last 5 minutes of the match after he led with his head on a heavy hit on Broncos forward Korbin Sims, breaking his jaw in the process, the sin-binning would prove costly for the Roosters with 12 men on the field and Broncos boom rookie Jamayne Isaako would score a dazzling try in the 78th minute and the Roosters would lose the thrilling match 28–22 at Suncorp Stadium. Napa would start at prop in Game 1 and 2 for Queensland in the 2018 State of Origin series but later got demoted to 18th man in Game 3 as the Maroons lost the series 2–1. In Round 24 against the Brisbane Broncos, Napa again got himself into trouble and was sin-binned, coincidentally the same way like the previous match against the Broncos, leading in with his head but this time knocking out Broncos hooker Andrew McCullough unconscious during the Roosters 22–8 loss at Sydney Football Stadium. On 27 August 2018, Napa was handed a 3 match suspension by the NRL after being charged with dangerous contact. The suspension meant that Napa missed the clubs week one finals victory over Cronulla and the preliminary final win against Souths. On 30 September 2018, Napa played in Sydney Roosters 2018 NRL Grand Final against the Melbourne Storm, playing off the interchange bench in the 21–6 victory, On 25 November 2018, Napa signed a three-year contract reportedly worth $2 million to join the Canterbury-Bankstown Bulldogs starting in the 2019 season as the ideal replacement for David Klemmer who left the club to join the Newcastle Knights.

=== 2019 ===
On 10 January 2019, lewd videos of Napa were leaked to the media. The first video leaked showed Napa being filmed having sexual intercourse with an unknown female with Napa saying in the video "Call me Big Papi, Call me Big Papa". On 12 January 2019, a second video was leaked with Napa performing a sex act while former teammate Kane Evans was filmed shadow boxing. On 13 January 2019, Napa reportedly approached police and engaged lawyers, with the sharing and publication of clips of that nature potentially in breach of so-called 'revenge porn' laws. On 27 January 2019, it was revealed that the leaked video originated from a WhatsApp Group message between Sydney Roosters players over 5 years ago stretching back to 2013. In February 2019, it was reported that Napa was facing a playing suspension in relation to the leaked videos. On 1 March 2019, it was announced that Napa had escaped suspension by the NRL but was docked 10 percent of his wage for the 2019 season. NRL CEO Todd Greenberg said of Napa's behavior that it was an "act of gross stupidity". Greenberg went on to say "The videos I have seen are gross, juvenile and disrespectful. If there was a grading in our system for stupidity, this behaviour would be at the very top end". In round 1 of the 2019 NRL season, Napa made his club debut for the Canterbury-Bankstown Bulldogs against the New Zealand Warriors, starting at prop in the 40–6 loss at Mt Smart Stadium. In round 2 against arch-rivals the Parramatta Eels, Napa scored his first try for in the 36–16 loss at ANZ Stadium. In round 4 against the Melbourne Storm, Napa was taken from the field during Canterbury's unlucky 18–16 loss at AAMI Park. Scans later revealed Napa suffered a grade two syndesmosis to his right ankle and was ruled out for six weeks.

=== 2020 ===
Napa played 16 games for Canterbury in the 2020 NRL season. The club finished 15th on the table and only avoided the wooden spoon due to a better for and against over last placed Brisbane.

=== 2021 ===
On 25 June, Napa was one of three Canterbury players who were ordered to self-isolate after attending a COVID-19 exposure site in Sydney's Eastern Suburbs. The NRL had ordered players of all 16 teams a week earlier not to attend any restaurants, clubs or bars in the Waverley Local Government area.

On 31 August, Napa was one of twelve players who were told by Canterbury that they would not be offered a contract for the 2022 season and would be released at season's end.

Napa made a total of 18 appearances for Canterbury in the 2021 NRL season as the club finished last and claimed the Wooden Spoon.

=== 2022 ===
On his debut for the Catalans Dragons, Napa was sent off in the 71st minute of the round one match against St Helens R.F.C. for a high hit on opponent Mark Percival, and was subsequently referred to the Rugby Football League's tribunal for a Grade D – Strikes with Shoulder charge. After unsuccessfully seeking a charge downgrade to a reckless high tackle, Napa received a £500 fine and was suspended for four matches over the incident. Napa played 20 games for Catalans during the 2022 season and featured in their elimination playoff loss to Leeds. On 8 December, Napa was released by the Catalans Dragons through mutual consent with a year remaining on his contract.

Napa made a single cap against Tonga, playing for the Cook Islands, in the postponed 2021 Rugby League World Cup. Coming off the bench he had 7 hit ups for 80 m with 3 tackle breaks an 2 offloads + 19 tackles in his 29-minute stint.

In late 2022, Napa signed a contract with the Sydney Roosters for the 2023 NRL season.

=== 2023 ===
In round 24 of the 2023 NRL season, Napa made his first appearance for the Sydney Roosters in almost five years as he was called into the NRL side to play against the Dolphins which the club would go on to win 30–14.

=== 2024 ===
In September, Napa was one of the players that would depart the Sydney Roosters at the end of the season. On 6 October, Napa was one of many players given the NRL Grand Final farewell for departing and retiring players.

=== 2025 ===
On 20 January 2025 it was reported that he would join Glebe Dirty Reds for 2025.

== Career stats ==
=== Club ===
Year	Team	Appearances	Tries	Points
2013	Sydney Roosters	7	-	-
2014	Sydney Roosters	24	-	-
2015	Sydney Roosters	26	2	8
2016	Sydney Roosters	23	1	4
2017	Sydney Roosters	21	-	-
2018	Sydney Roosters	20	-	-
2019	Canterbury-Bankstown Bulldogs	20	2	8
2020	Canterbury-Bankstown Bulldogs	16		
2021	Canterbury-Bankstown Bulldogs	18	2	8
2022	Catalans Dragons	20		
2023	Sydney Roosters	2		
	Totals	198	7	24

=== Representative ===
Years	Team	Appearances	Tries	Goals	Goal-kicking percentage	Field goals	Points
2017-2019	Queensland	6	-	-	-	-	-
2013	Cook Islands	3	-	-	-	-	-
2014-2016	Prime Minister's XIII	2	-	-	-	-	-
