= Grant Garvey =

Australian rugby league footballer

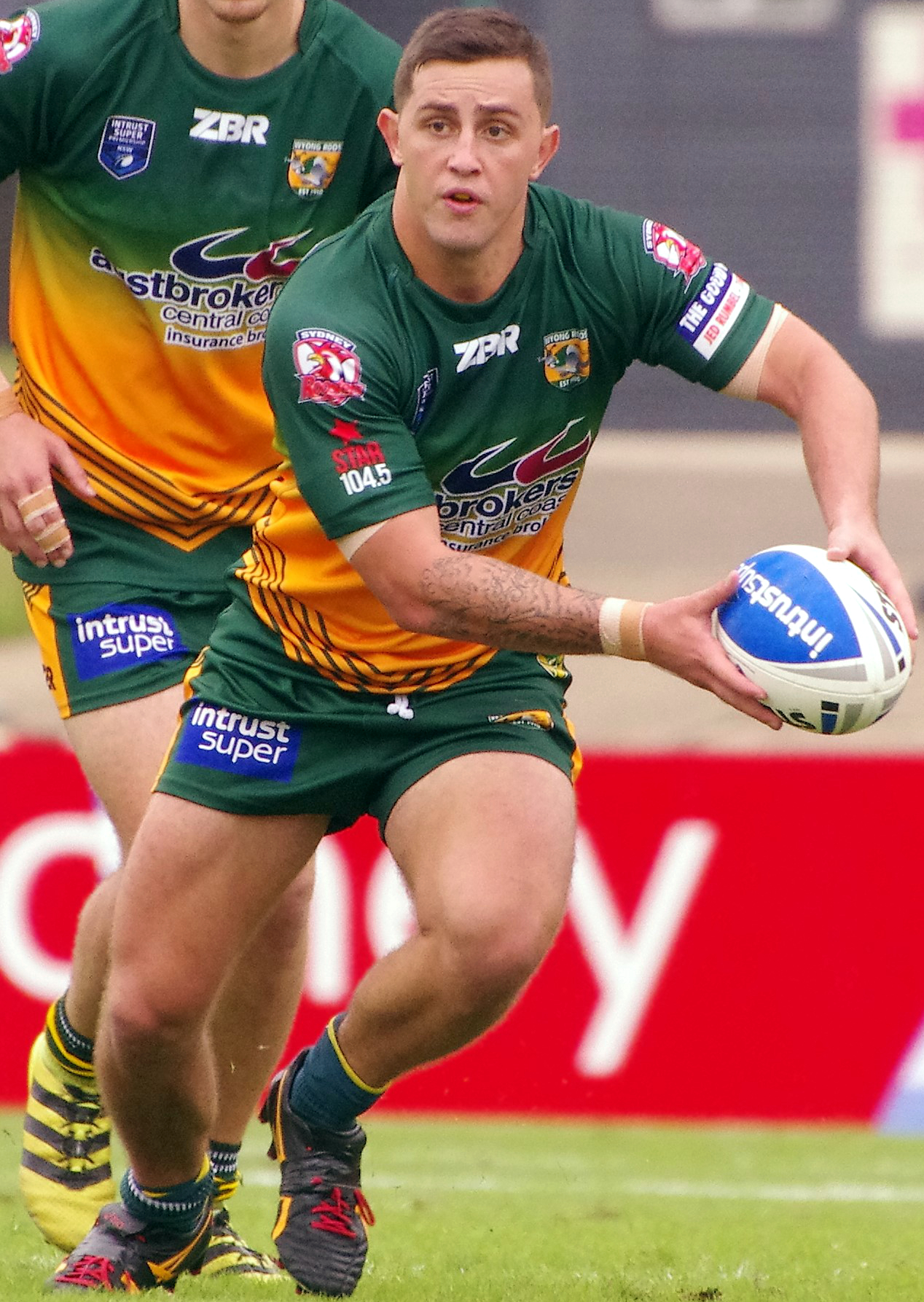

Personal information
- Born: 17 September 1996 (age 28); La Perouse, New South Wales, Australia

Playing information
- Height: 186 cm (6 ft 1 in)
- Weight: 88 kg (13 st 12 lb)
- Position: Hooker
Club
| Years | Team | Pld | T | G | FG | P |
|---|---|---|---|---|---|---|
| 2016 | Sydney Roosters | 1 | 0 | 0 | 0 | 0 |
- Relatives: Craig Garvey (brother)

Grant Garvey (born 17 September 1996) is an Australian former professional rugby league footballer who last played for the Newtown Jets in the Intrust Super Premiership NSW. His position was hooker. He previously played for the Sydney Roosters in the National Rugby League.

== Background ==
Born in Sydney, New South Wales, Garvey is of Indigenous Australian descent and played his junior rugby league for La Perouse United and South Eastern Seagulls. He was then signed by the Sydney Roosters.

Garvey is the younger brother of Sydney Roosters player Craig Garvey.

== Playing career ==
=== Early career ===
From 2014 to 2016, Garvey played for the Sydney Roosters' NYC team. On 8 July 2015, he played for the New South Wales under-20s team against the Queensland under-20s team.

=== 2016 ===
On 13 July, Garvey played for the New South Wales under-20s team against the Queensland under-20s team for a second year in a row. In Round 22 of the 2016 NRL season, he made his NRL debut for the Roosters against the Penrith Panthers. He captained the 2016 Sydney Roosters Holden Cup Premiership winning side.

=== 2017 ===
In 2017, Garvey made no first grade appearances for the Sydney Roosters. Garvey instead played the season with the clubs feeder side Wyong.

=== 2018 ===
In 2018, Garvey played for Queensland Cup side the Tweed Heads Seagulls.

=== 2019 ===
In 2019, Garvey joined NSW Cup side Newtown.

=== 2024 ===
In 2024, Garvey travelled to America to play with the Southwest Florida Copperheads in the USARL.
