= Craig Garvey =

Australian rugby league footballer

Craig "Garvs" Garvey
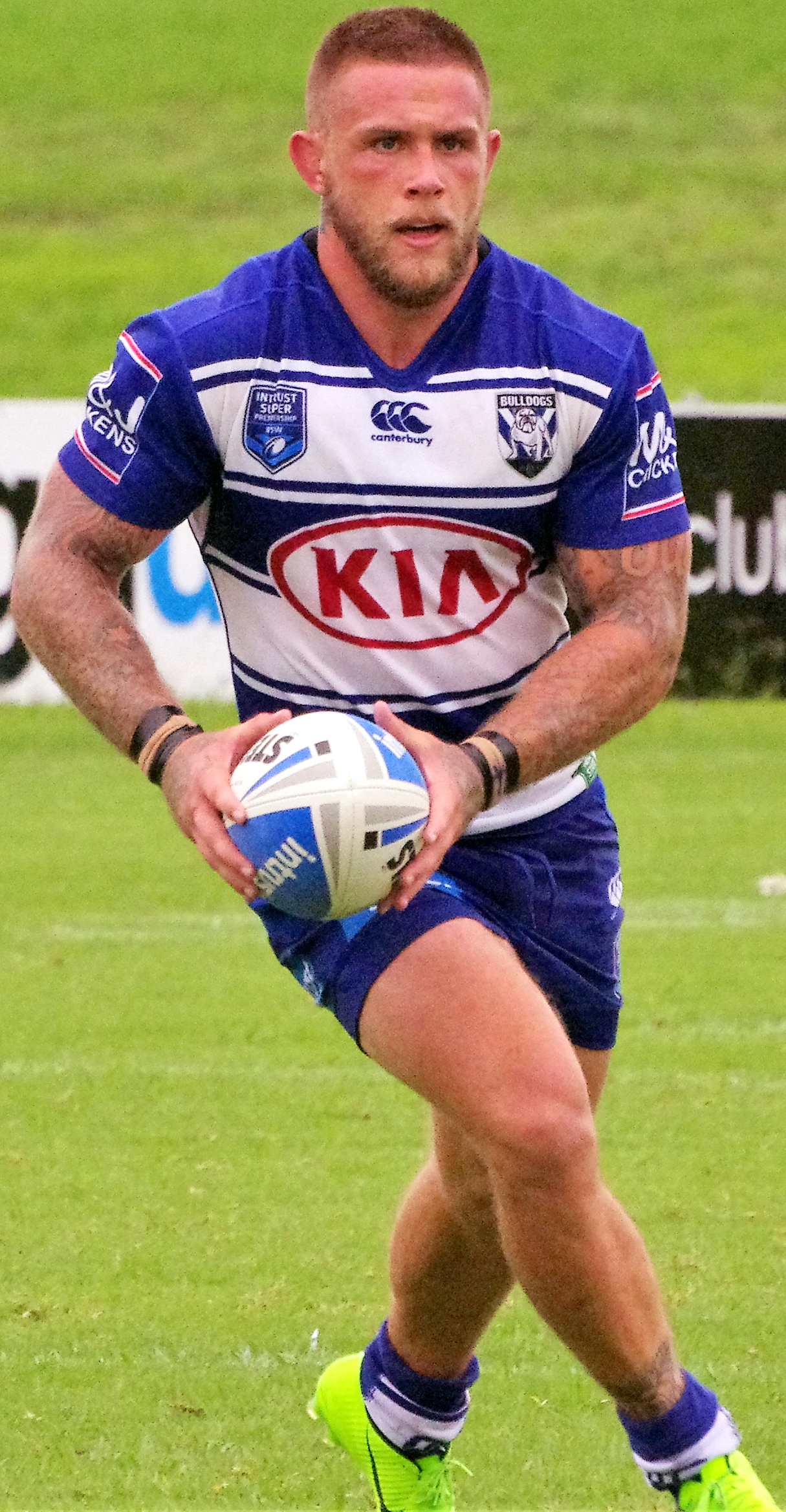

Personal information
- Full name: Craig Garvey
- Born: 28 April 1993 (age 33) La Perouse, New South Wales, Australia
- Height: 173 cm (5 ft 8 in)
- Weight: 87 kg (13 st 10 lb)

Playing information
- Position: Hooker
Club
Years	Team	Pld	T	G	FG	P
2013–15	St. George Illawarra	10	0	0	0	0
2016–17	Canterbury Bulldogs	13	2	0	0	8
	Total	23	2	0	0	8
Representative
Years	Team	Pld	T	G	FG	P
2016	Indigenous All Stars	1	0	0	0	0
- Source: As of 15 May 2019
- Relatives: Grant Garvey (brother)

Craig Garvey (born 28 April 1993) is an Australian professional rugby league footballer who plays for the Glebe Dirty Reds in the Ron Massey Cup. He previously played for the St. George Illawarra Dragons and Canterbury Bulldogs, was part of the Canberra Raiders squad for 2018 and a short-term member of the Sydney Roosters for 2019.

== Background ==
Garvey was born in Sydney, New South Wales, Australia.

He played his junior rugby league for the Earlwood Saints and La Perouse Panthers, before being signed by the St. George Illawarra Dragons.

== Playing career ==
=== Early career ===
In 2012 and 2013, Garvey played for the St. George Illawarra Dragons' NYC team.

=== 2013 ===
In 2013, Garvey captained St. George's NYC side. On 20 April, he played for the New South Wales under-20s team against the Queensland under-20s team. On 1 May, he re-signed with St. George Illawarra on a two-year contract. In round 17 of the 2013 NRL season, he made his NRL debut for St. George Illawarra against the Sydney Roosters.

=== 2014 ===
Garvey was named in the St. George squad for the 2014 NRL Auckland Nines.

On 28 February, Garvey was stood down by St. George, later being found to have been guilty to assaulting a man. On 16 December, after consultation and approval from the NRL, St. George Illawarra reinstated him into the full-time first-grade squad.

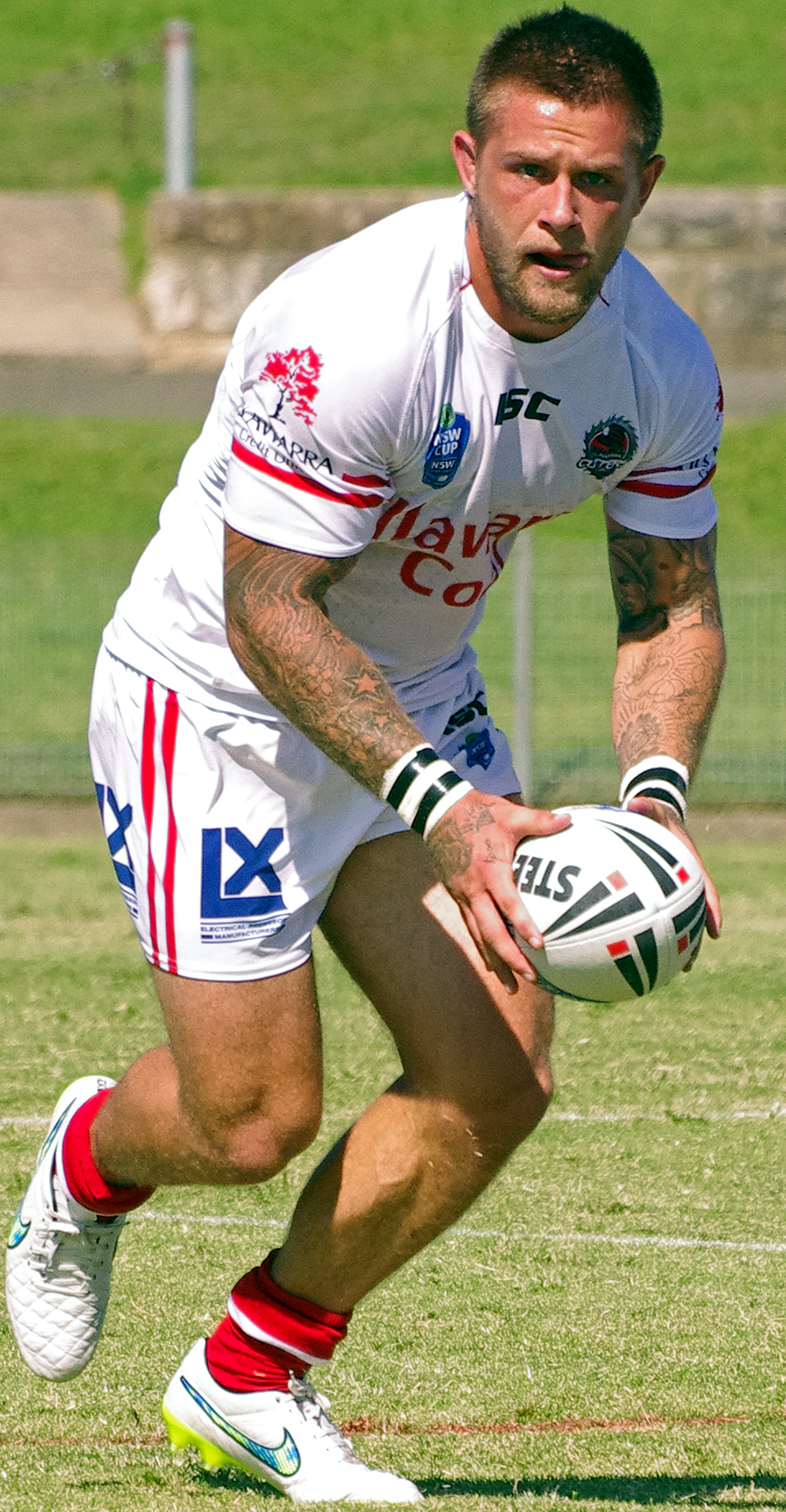
Garvey playing for the Illawarra Cutters in 2015

=== 2015 ===
On 31 January and 1 February 2015, Garvey played for St. George Illawarra in the 2015 NRL Auckland Nines.

On 3 November, Garvey signed a two-year contract with the Canterbury-Bankstown Bulldogs starting in 2016.

=== 2016 ===
On 13 February, Garvey played for the Indigenous All Stars against the World All Stars.

Garvey was named in the Bulldogs' 2016 NRL Auckland Nines squad.

=== 2017 ===
Garvey was named in the Canterbury-Bankstown squad for the 2017 NRL Auckland Nines.

=== 2018 ===
In late 2017, Garvey signed a contract to join the Canberra Raiders for the 2018 season. Garvey was unable to break into Canberra's first team and spent the majority of the season playing for their feeder team the Mount Pritchard Mounties. On 1 August, Garvey was released by Canberra with the player citing family reasons as to why the contract was ended.

=== 2019 ===
In 2019, Garvey signed a contract to join reigning premiers the Sydney Roosters.

=== 2024 ===
On 14 September, Garvey played in Glebe's Ron Massey Cup grand final victory over Wentworthville.
