= 2015 State of Origin series =

Australian rugby league series

- Won by: Queensland (19th title)
- Series margin: 2-1
- Points scored: 123
- Attendance: 224,135 (ave. 74,712 per match)
- Player of the series: Corey Parker
- Top points scorer(s): Johnathan Thurston – 26
- Top try scorer(s): Josh Morris; Michael Jennings; Greg Inglis; Will Chambers; Matt Gillett (All 2 Tries Each)

The 2015 State of Origin series was the 34th time the annual best-of-three series between the Queensland and New South Wales rugby league teams to be played entirely under 'state of origin' rules (1980 and 1981 were only one game series). It was the third series to be administered by the Australian Rugby League Commission which was created in a major restructure of the sport's administration in Australia.

This series had one game played in each of Sydney, Melbourne and Brisbane, with Game I played at the 83,500 capacity ANZ Stadium, Game II played at the 100,024 capacity Melbourne Cricket Ground, and Game III played at the 52,500 capacity Suncorp Stadium.

Former Canberra, Queensland and Australian captain Mal Meninga was coach of the Queensland side, whose eight-year State of Origin series winning streak was ended by New South Wales in 2014. The Blues were coached by former Canberra, NSW and Australia captain Laurie Daley for a third consecutive year.

== Game I ==
Wednesday, 27 May 2015
8:05 pm

New South Wales	10 – 11	Queensland
Tries: Morris (21') 1 Scott (27') 1 Goals: Hodkinson (28') 1/2	Report	Tries: 1 (14') Cronk; 1 (55') Chambers; Goals: 1/3 (15') Thurston; Field goals: 1 (74') Cronk

ANZ Stadium
Attendance: 80,122
Referee: Gerard Sutton, Ben Cummins
Player of the Match: Cameron Smith

National Anthem: Josh Piterman

== Game II ==
Wednesday, 17 June 2015
8:16 pm

Queensland	18 – 26	New South Wales
Tries: Scott (11') 1 Inglis (33') 1 Gillett (48') 1 Goals: Thurston 3/4 (12', 48', 57' pen)	report	Tries: 1 (4') Jennings; 1 (27') J Morris; 1 (62') Woods; 1 (71') Dugan; Goals: 5/5 Hodkinson (6', 28', 39' pen, 64', 72')

Melbourne Cricket Ground
Attendance: 91,513
Referee: Gerard Sutton, Ben Cummins
Player of the Match: Michael Jennings

National Anthem: Claire Lyon

== Game III ==
Wednesday, 8 July 2015
8:00pm

Queensland	52 – 6	New South Wales
Tries: Gagai (15') 1 Papalii (27') 1 Inglis (35') 1 Gillett (42') 1 Morgan (50') 1 Boyd (56') 1 Chambers (68') 1 Guerra (78') 1 Goals: Thurston 9/9 (9' pen, 16', 29', 33' pen, 37', 42', 52', 58, 69'); Hodges (80') 1/1	Report	Tries: 1 (61') Jennings; Goals: 1/2 (6' pen) Hodkinson

Suncorp Stadium
Attendance: 52,500
Referee: Gerard Sutton, Ben Cummins
Player of the Match: Johnathan Thurston

National Anthem: Australian Girls Choir and Danielle de Niese

Corey Parker was awarded the Wally Lewis medal for player of the series.

== Teams ==
The 18th, 19th & 20th man are reserves to cover for any forthcoming injuries to the selected squad and, unless chosen, do not actually play.

=== New South Wales Blues ===
Position	Game 1	Game 2	Game 3
Fullback	Josh Dugan		
Wing	Will Hopoate		
Centre	Josh Morris		
Centre	Michael Jennings		
Wing	Daniel Tupou	Brett Morris	
Five-eighth	Mitchell Pearce		
Halfback	Trent Hodkinson		
Prop	Aaron Woods		
Hooker	Robbie Farah (c)	Robbie Farah	Michael Ennis^{2}
Prop	James Tamou		
Second row	Beau Scott		
Second row	Ryan Hoffman		
Lock	Josh Jackson	Paul Gallen (c)^{1}	
Interchange	Trent Merrin		
Interchange	Boyd Cordner		
Interchange	David Klemmer		
Interchange	Andrew Fifita	Josh Jackson	
Coach	Laurie Daley		
18th Man	Tyson Frizell	Tariq Sims	
19th Man	Ryan James	Dylan Walker	Alex Johnston
20th Man	Matt Moylan		

1 - Gallen retained the captaincy role from Farah in Game II.

2 - Robbie Farah was originally chosen to play in Game lll but withdrew due to a hand injury, he was replaced by Michael Ennis on game day.

=== Queensland Maroons ===
Position	Game 1	Game 2	Game 3
Fullback	Billy Slater		Greg Inglis
Wing	Darius Boyd		
Centre	Greg Inglis		Will Chambers
Centre	Justin Hodges		
Wing	Will Chambers		Dane Gagai
Five-eighth	Johnathan Thurston		
Halfback	Cooper Cronk	Daly Cherry-Evans	Cooper Cronk
Prop	Matt Scott		
Hooker	Cameron Smith (c)		
Prop	Nate Myles		
Second row	Aidan Guerra		
Second row	Sam Thaiday		
Lock	Corey Parker		
Interchange	Michael Morgan^{1}		
Interchange	Josh McGuire		Josh Papalii
Interchange	Matt Gillett		
Interchange	Jacob Lillyman		
Coach	Mal Meninga		
18th Man	Dylan Napa	Josh Papalii	Edrick Lee
19th Man	Dane Gagai		
20th Man		Korbin Sims	

1 - Daly Cherry-Evans was originally selected to play in game one but withdrew due to injury. He was replaced by Michael Morgan, then Morgan retained his spot on the bench in Game II and III.

== Residents ==
TBD

Queensland	v	New South Wales

TBD

== Under-20s ==
8 July 2015
18:00 (Local)

New South Wales	32-16	Queensland

Suncorp Stadium

== Women's Interstate Challenge ==
27 June 2015
14:45 (Local)

New South Wales	4-4	Queensland
Tries: Kelly 1	report	Tries: 1 Baker

1300SMILES Stadium

== Records ==
Game II achieved the highest ever attendance for a State of Origin Game, with a crowd of 91,513 people in attendance.

Game III saw numerous records broken:

- Game III achieved the highest ever attendance for a match at Suncorp Stadium, with a crowd of 52,500 people in attendance.
- Queensland captain Cameron Smith made his 36th Queensland appearance, drawing level with Darren Lockyer for most appearances for Queensland.
- Johnathan Thurston scored 18 points, equalling Lote Tuqiri's for most points in a single match by a Queenslander. In addition, Thurston kicked 9 goals from 9 attempts, an Origin record.
- With a 52-6 victory, Queensland equaled their record for highest State of Origin score, and broke the record for largest winning margin in State of Origin history, with a 46-point winning margin.
