= 2016 State of Origin series =

Australian rugby league series

- Won by: Queensland (20th title)
- Series margin: 2-1
- Points scored: 84
- Attendance: 193,811 (ave. 64,604 per match)
- Player of the series: Cameron Smith
- Top points scorer(s): Dane Gagai (16)
- Top try scorer(s): Dane Gagai (4)

The 2016 State of Origin series was the 35th time the annual best-of-three series between the Queensland and New South Wales rugby league teams to be played entirely under 'state of origin' rules (1980 and 1981 were only one game series).

The Maroons were the defending champions, but had a new coach in Kevin Walters, following the appointment of Mal Meninga to the position of Australian head coach.

== Game I ==
Wednesday, June 1, 2016
8:15 pm

New South Wales	4 – 6	Queensland
Tries: Cordner 1 Goals: Reynolds 0/1	Report	Tries: 1 Gagai; Goals: 1/2 Thurston

ANZ Stadium
Attendance: 80,251
Referee: Gerard Sutton, Ben Cummins
Player of the Match: Matt Gillett

== Game II ==
Wednesday, 22 June 2016
8:15 pm

Queensland	26 – 16	New South Wales
Tries: Gagai 3 Oates 1 Goals: Thurston 5/6		Tries: 1 Frizell; 1 Maloney; Goals: 3/3 Reynolds; 1/1 Maloney

Suncorp Stadium
Attendance: 52,293
Referee: Gerard Sutton, Ben Cummins
Player of the Match: Cameron Smith

== Game III ==
Wednesday, 13 July 2016
8:15pm

New South Wales	18 – 14	Queensland
Tries: Frizell 1 Fifita 1 Jennings 1 Goals: Maloney 2/2; Gallen 1/1; Sin Bin: Fifita 1		Tries: 1 Inglis; 1 Cooper; 1 Boyd; Goals: 1/3 Thurston; Sin Bin: 1 Cronk

ANZ Stadium
Attendance: 61,267
Referee: Gerard Sutton, Ben Cummins
Player of the Match: James Maloney

== Teams ==
=== New South Wales Blues ===
Position	Game 1	Game 2	Game 3
Fullback	Matt Moylan		James Tedesco
Wing	Blake Ferguson		
Centre	Michael Jennings		
Centre	Josh Morris	Dylan Walker	Josh Dugan
Wing	Josh Mansour		
Five-eighth	James Maloney		Matt Moylan
Halfback	Adam Reynolds		James Maloney
Prop	Aaron Woods		
Hooker	Robbie Farah		
Prop	Paul Gallen (c)	James Tamou	Paul Gallen (c)
Second row	Boyd Cordner	Josh Jackson	Wade Graham
Second row	Josh Jackson	Tyson Frizell	Josh Jackson
Lock	James Tamou	Paul Gallen (c)	Tyson Frizell
Interchange	Greg Bird		Jack Bird
Interchange	Dylan Walker	David Klemmer	James Tamou
Interchange	David Klemmer	Andrew Fifita	David Klemmer
Interchange	Andrew Fifita	Jack Bird	Andrew Fifita
Coach	Laurie Daley		

=== Queensland Maroons ===
Position	Game 1	Game 2	Game 3
Fullback	Darius Boyd		
Wing	Corey Oates		
Centre	Greg Inglis		
Centre	Justin O'Neill		
Wing	Dane Gagai		
Five-eighth	Johnathan Thurston		
Halfback	Cooper Cronk		
Prop	Matt Scott		
Hooker	Cameron Smith (c)		
Prop	Nate Myles	Josh McGuire	Nate Myles
Second row	Matt Gillett		
Second row	Sam Thaiday		
Lock	Corey Parker		
Interchange	Michael Morgan		Gavin Cooper
Interchange	Josh McGuire	Jacob Lillyman	Josh McGuire
Interchange	Aidan Guerra		
Interchange	Josh Papalii		Jacob Lillyman
Coach	Kevin Walters		

1 - Darius Boyd in his 24th appearance for Queensland made his first origin start at fullback after playing his previous 23 matches on the wing. This was because Billy Slater was sidelined for 8 months in March after a shoulder surgery.

2 - For the first time since 2006, the Maroons had a new coach, with Kevin Walters taking over from Mal Meninga, who famously oversaw the 8 consecutive series victories during his time in charge.

== Player Debuts ==
=== Game 1 ===
- Cap no. 258 Josh Mansour
- Cap no. 259 Matt Moylan
- Cap no. 260 Adam Reynolds
- Cap no. 261 Dylan Walker
- Cap no. 183 Corey Oates
- Cap no. 184 Justin O'Neill

=== Game 2 ===
- Cap no. 262 Jack Bird
- Cap no. 263 Tyson Frizell

=== Game 3 ===
- Cap no. 264 James Tedesco
- Cap no. 265 Wade Graham
- Cap no. 185 Gavin Cooper

== Residents ==
8 May 2016

New South Wales	30 - 16	Queensland

Langlands Park

== Under-20s ==
13 July 2016

New South Wales	36-22	Queensland

ANZ Stadium

== Women's Interstate Challenge ==
23 July 2016

New South Wales	8 - 4	Queensland

Cbus Super Stadium
