= Aidan Guerra =

Australia & Italy international rugby league footballer

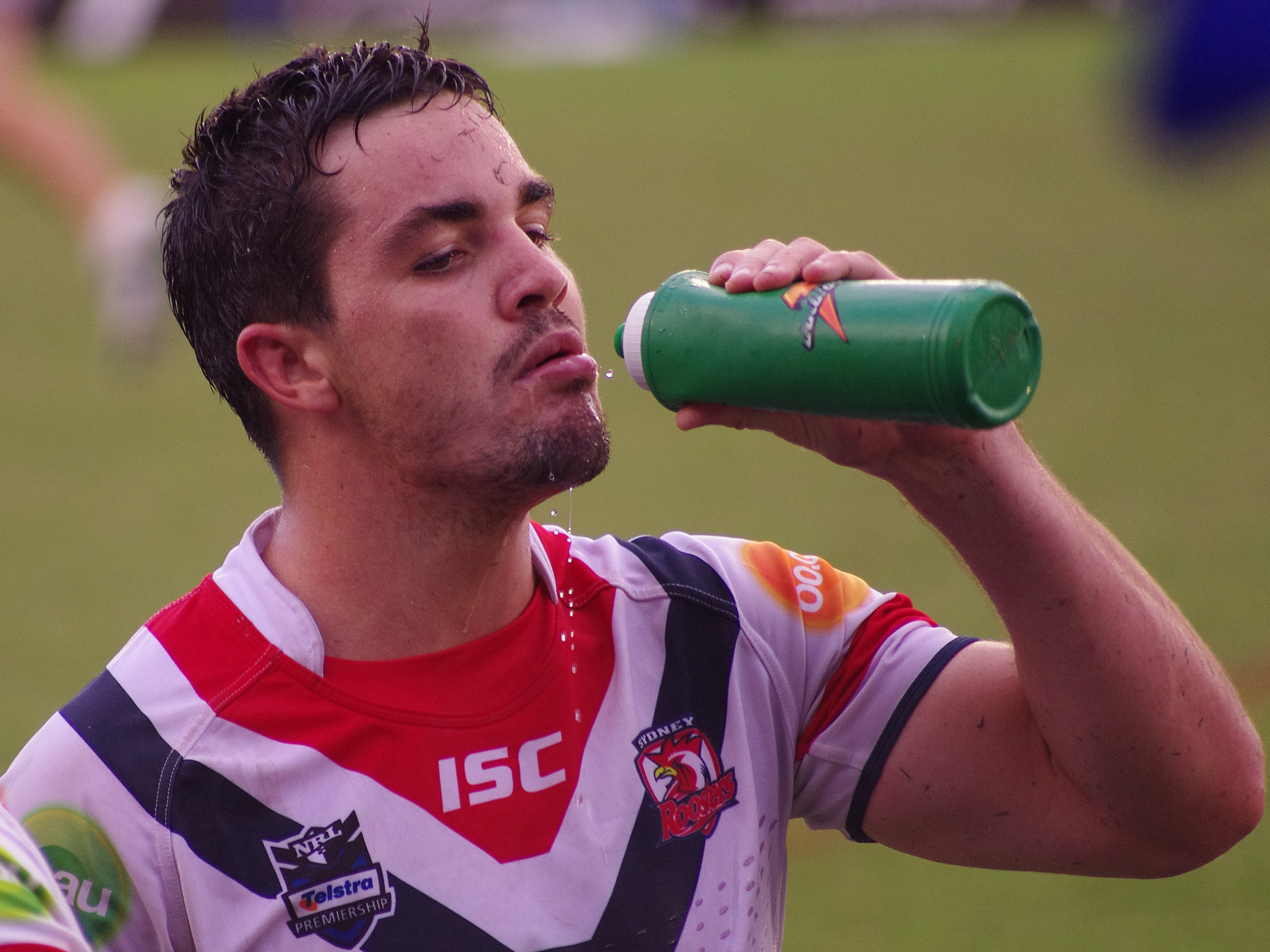

Personal information
- Born: 25 February 1988 (age 38) Cairns, Queensland, Australia

Playing information
- Height: 191 cm (6 ft 3 in)
- Weight: 104 kg (16 st 5 lb)
- Position: Second-row, Lock
Club
Years	Team	Pld	T	G	FG	P
2010–17	Sydney Roosters	154	40	0	0	160
2018–20	Newcastle Knights	57	9	1	0	38
	Total	211	49	1	0	198
Representative
Years	Team	Pld	T	G	FG	P
2010	NSW Residents	1	1	0	0	4
2013	Italy	3	2	0	0	8
2014–17	Queensland	10	2	0	0	8
2014	Australia	1	0	0	0	0

Aidan Guerra (born 25 February 1988) is a former professional rugby league footballer who played for the Sydney Roosters, with whom he won the 2013 NRL Grand Final, and the Newcastle Knights in the NRL. He represented both Italy and Australia at international level and Queensland in the State of Origin series. His positions were second-row and lock.

== Early years ==
Guerra was born in Cairns, Queensland, Australia. He is of Italian descent.

Guerra attended Ignatius Park College in Townsville and played his junior rugby league with Townsville Brothers.

Guerra was then signed with NRL club the Melbourne Storm, but never featured in the first grade squad, mostly being sidelined through injuries. The club then banned him from appearing in any grade after he signed with the Roosters for the next season. Guerra was named in the Italian side for the 2009 European Cup, but did not play.

== Playing career ==
=== 2010 ===
In round 1 of the season, Guerra made his NRL debut for the Sydney Roosters, against the South Sydney Rabbitohs at ANZ Stadium, scoring a try off the interchange bench in the Roosters 36–10 win. Guerra played for New South Wales residents against the Queensland residents team, scoring a try in the 28–20 win. Guerra finished his debut year with three tries from nine matches.

=== 2011 ===
Guerra played in 14 matches and scored six tries for the Sydney Roosters in 2011. He was announced as a member of the Italian side that competed in 2013 World Cup qualifying, but again did not feature.

=== 2012 ===
Guerra played in 19 matches and scored five tries for the Sydney Roosters in the 2012 NRL season.

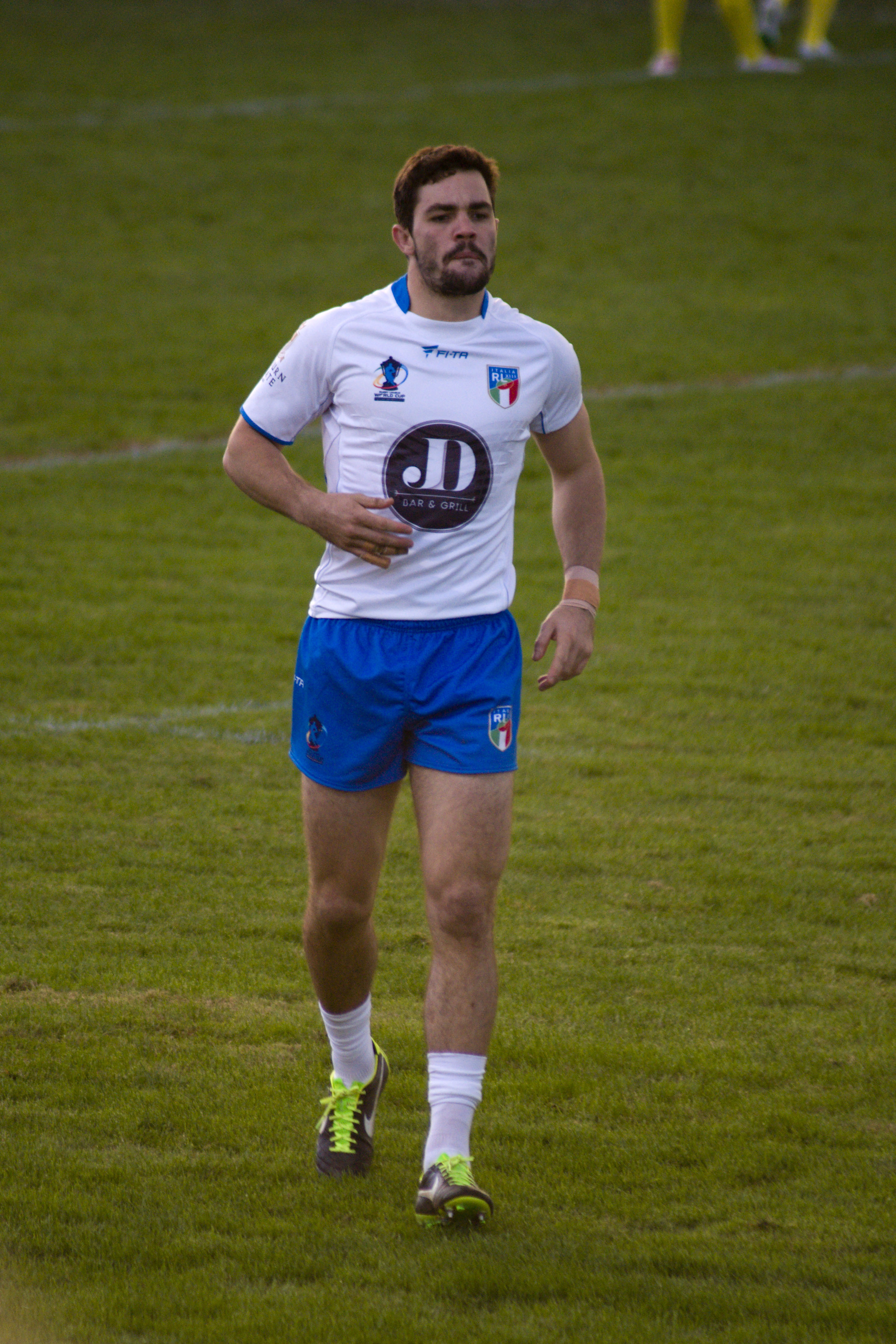
Guerra playing for Italy in 2013 World Cup against Scotland

=== 2013 ===
In the 2013 NRL Grand Final, Guerra played at second-row and scored a try in the Sydney Roosters 26–18 victory over the Manly-Warringah Sea Eagles. Guerra played in 22 matches and scored six tries in the Sydney Roosters successful 2013 NRL season. In the post season, Guerra made his international debut playing for Italy in the 2013 World Cup. He played all three matches at centre and scored two tries against Wales in Italy's 32–16 win at Millennium Stadium.

=== 2014 ===
In May, Guerra was named as the only change to the Queensland team for game 1 of the 2014 State of Origin series in place of the injured Sam Thaiday. He made his debut in the Maroons 8–12 loss at Suncorp Stadium. Guerra started at second-row in game 2, as the Maroons lost again, 4–6. In game 3, at Suncorp Stadium, Guerra scored his first origin try in the Maroons 32–8 win. Guerra finished off the Roosters season with 6 tries from 23 matches. On 14 October, Guerra was selected in the Australian Kangaroos 24-man squad for the 2014 Four Nations. He made his Australian debut and played his only match in the tournament in the 30–12 loss against New Zealand off the interchange bench at Suncorp Stadium. On 23 December, Guerra extended his contract with the Sydney Roosters to the end of the 2017 season.

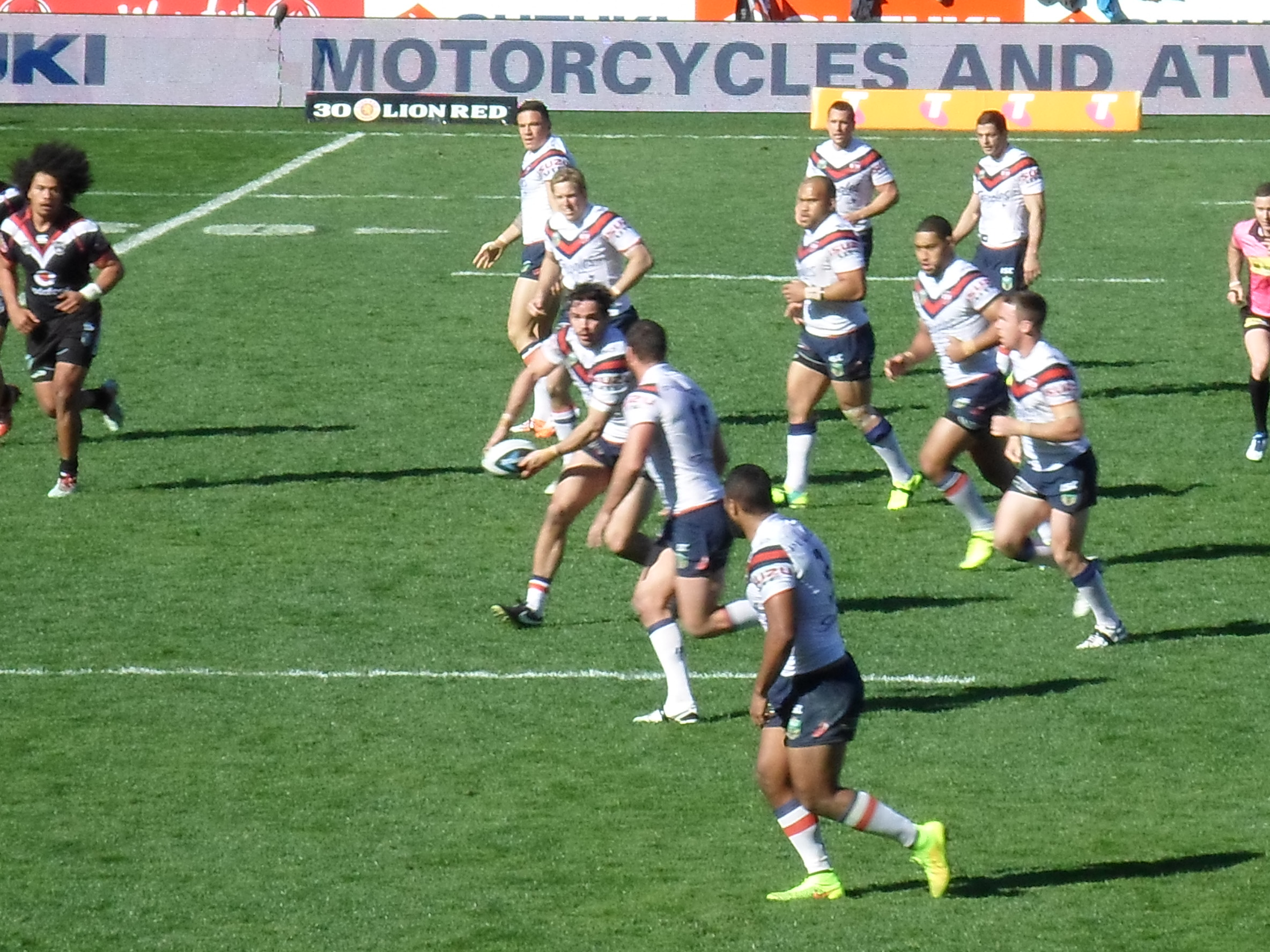
Aidan Guerra with the ball in the Roosters victory against Warriors, 2014, supported by his teammates

=== 2015 ===
Guerra retained his State of Origin spot in the second-row for all 3 matches in 2015, scoring a try in the third match. In round 20, against the Wests Tigers, he played his 100th NRL career match in the 33–8 win at the Sydney Football Stadium. Guerra scored five tries from his 22 NRL matches.

=== 2016 ===
Despite playing in all 3 State of Origin matches, Guerra was moved to the bench by the Sydney Roosters, and then dropped to reserve grade later in the season. He said, "Getting dropped always hurts whether you know you deserve it or not. But I felt that I deserved to be dropped and it was up to me if I got that reprieve to make the most of it and show I deserved to be out there. It has been hard. I have been trying to put my finger on it for 24 rounds. Some games have been good, but too many haven't." Guerra finished the season with 21 matches and 4 tries for the Sydney Roosters.

=== 2017 ===
Guerra played off the bench in the first State of Origin game of the series. After the shock defeat, Guerra was one of many players to be axed from the Maroons squad for fresher blood for Game 2. On 15 June, it was announced that Guerra signed a three-year contract with the Newcastle Knights starting in 2018. In Round 23 against the Melbourne Storm, Guerra played his 150th NRL match in the 16–13 loss at AAMI Park. Guerra finished his last year with the Sydney Roosters with 24 matches and five tries. At the end of the season, he was named in the training squad for Italy for the 2017 Rugby League World Cup but later ruled himself out.

=== 2018 ===
In round 1 of the 2018 season, Guerra made his debut for the Newcastle club in their 19-18 golden point extra-time win over the Manly Warringah Sea Eagles. In Round 2 against the Canberra Raiders, Guerra scored his first club try for the Newcastle side in the 30–28 win at Canberra Stadium.

=== 2020 ===
Guerra announced that he would retire from professional rugby league at the end of the 2020 season. He played all 21 games for the Newcastle club in his final season, which was shortened due to the COVID-19 pandemic. In week 1 of the finals, Guerra played his final game in a 20–46 loss to the South Sydney Rabbitohs, kicking a conversion from the sideline in the last moment of his career.
