= Korbin Sims =

Fiji international rugby league footballer

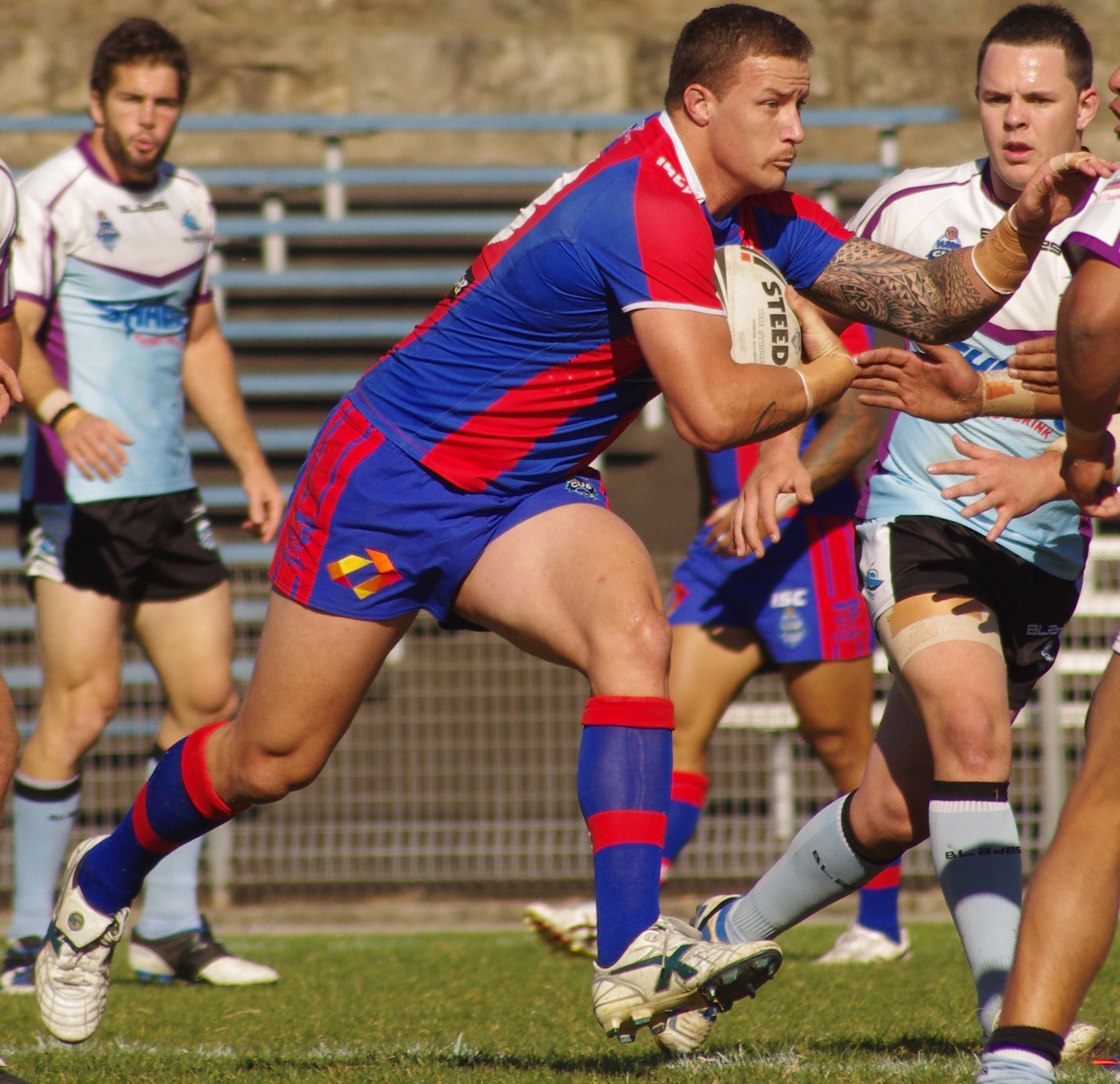

Personal information
- Born: 2 January 1992 (age 34) Gerringong, New South Wales, Australia

Playing information
- Height: 6 ft 2 in (1.89 m)
- Weight: 17 st 0 lb (108 kg)
- Position: Prop, Loose forward, Second-row
Club
Years	Team	Pld	T	G	FG	P
2013–16	Newcastle Knights	76	7	0	0	28
2017–18	Brisbane Broncos	44	9	0	0	36
2019–20	St. George Illawarra	21	2	0	0	8
2021–22	Hull Kingston Rovers	32	1	0	0	0
	Total	173	19	0	0	72
Representative
Years	Team	Pld	T	G	FG	P
2013–	Fiji	12	3	0	0	12
- Relatives: Ashton Sims (brother); Tariq Sims (brother); Ruan Sims (sister); Reagan Campbell-Gillard (cousin)

Korbin Sims (born 2 January 1992) is a former Fiji international rugby league footballer who last played as a prop, loose forward and second-row forward for Hull Kingston Rovers in the Super League.

He previously played for the Newcastle Knights, Brisbane Broncos and the St. George Illawarra Dragons in the NRL.

== Background ==
Sims was born in Gerringong, New South Wales, Australia, and is of Fijian descent. Sims is the younger brother of St. George Illawarra Dragons player Tariq Sims and former player Ashton Sims. His elder sister Ruan Sims played for the Australian women's team in 2010 and 2015.

== Playing career ==
=== Early years ===
Sims played his junior football for the Gerringong Lions and Wests Panthers before being signed by the Brisbane Broncos, along with his brothers, Ashton and Tariq in 2008. Sims played for the Queensland U16's and U18's teams. He played for the Broncos NYC team in 2010, playing alongside his brother Tariq, scoring 2 tries in 9 games. In 2011, Sims joined the Newcastle Knights, playing in the NYC team in 2011 and 2012, scoring 14 tries in 40 games.

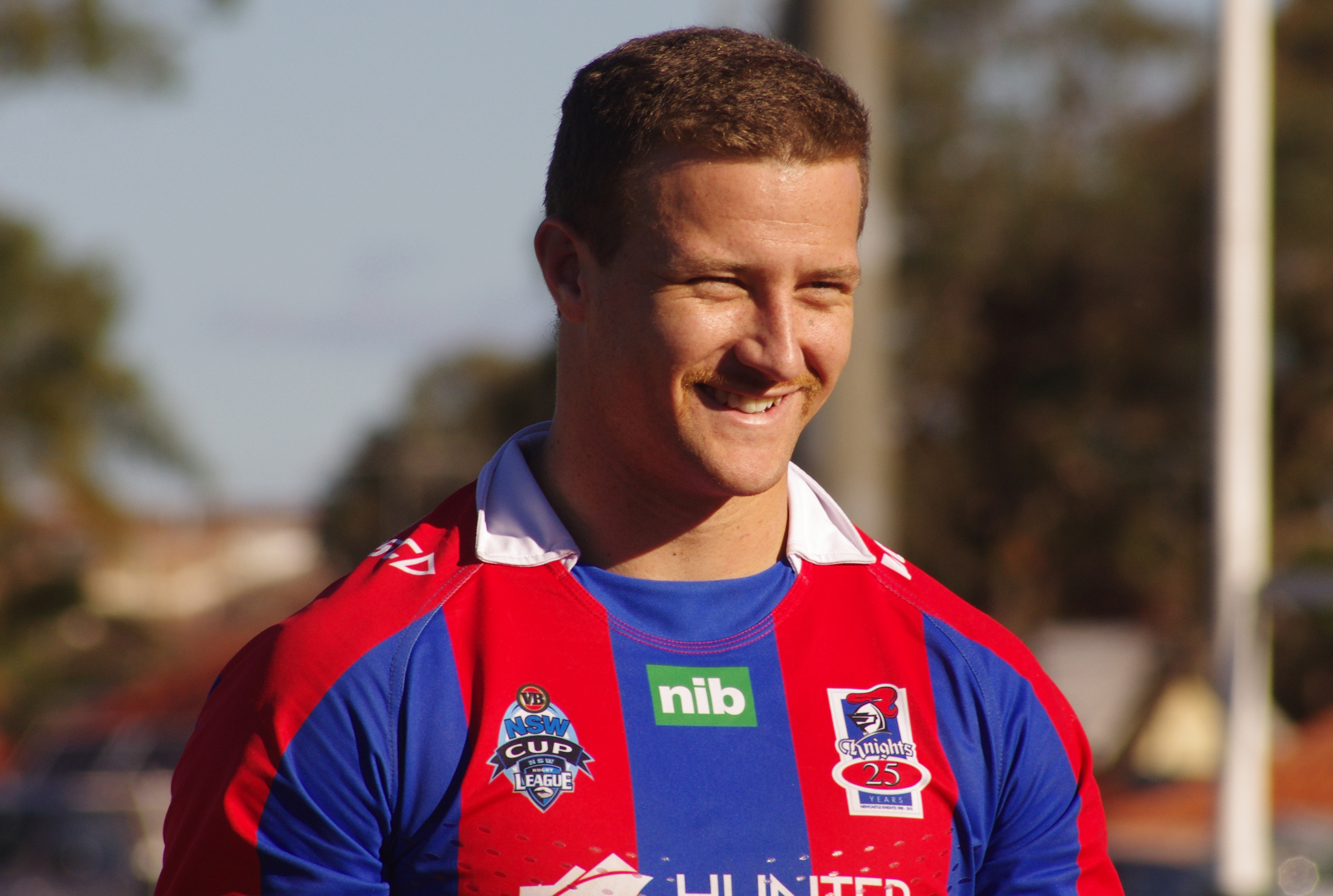
Sims playing for the Knights in 2012

In 2012, Sims was named at prop in the inaugural Under 20's State of Origin match for Queensland, but withdrew due to a broken hand. Sims was named at prop in the 2012 Toyota Cup Team of the Year. On 2 October 2012, Sims was named at second-row in the Junior Kangaroos team to face the Junior Kiwis.

=== 2013 ===
In Round 3 of the 2013 NRL season, Sims made his NRL debut for the Newcastle club against the North Queensland Cowboys off the interchange bench, playing against his brother Ashton in Newcastle's 34–6 win at Hunter Stadium.

On 3 June, Sims re-signed with the Newcastle side on a two-year contract after rejecting offers from North Queensland and the Manly-Warringah Sea Eagles. Sims made 12 appearances for the season. He was selected in the Fiji 24-man squad along his brothers Ashton and Tariq for the 2013 Rugby League World Cup, playing in 3 matches and scoring a try in his Fiji international debut against Ireland in the 32–14 win at Spotland Stadium.

=== 2014 ===
In Round 7 against the Brisbane Broncos, Sims scored his first NRL career try in Newcastle's 32–6 loss at Hunter Stadium. In May, Sims played for Fiji in the 2014 Pacific Test. Fiji lost the test match 32–16, but Korbin stole the limelight with a massive shot on Samoan opponent Isaac Liu. Sims finished the year with him playing in 20 matches and scoring 2 tries.

=== 2015 ===
In the pre-season, Sims played for Newcastle in the 2015 NRL Auckland Nines. On 13 March, he again re-signed with the Newcastle outfit on a two-year contract.

On 2 May, he played for Fiji against Papua New Guinea in the 2015 Melanesian Cup.

On 10 May, Sims groped the genitals of opposition player and former teammate Willie Mason, an action described by Rugby League writer Brad Walter as being "infantile", "bizarre and offensive", and worthy of punishment due to the potential for the incident to portray the NRL in a distasteful and damaging light. Despite some rugby league reporters calling for harsh disciplinary action as a result of the incident, Mason was unperturbed, stating that he found the incident "hilarious." Sims received a warning from the NRL match review committee. Sims apologized for any offence caused to those who were watching the game and described it as a "harmless gesture between two friends."

On 10 June, Sims was named as 20th-man for the Queensland team for game 2 of the 2015 State of Origin series. In the same match, his brother, Tariq, was named as 19th-man for New South Wales. However, neither of them played in the match. Sims finished off the 2015 season having played in 22 matches and scoring two tries.

=== 2016 ===
On 12 January, Sims was selected in the QAS Emerging Maroons squad. In February, he played for the Knights in the 2016 NRL Auckland Nines. He finished the 2016 season having played in 22 matches and scoring three tries. In October, he played for Fiji against Samoa, starting at lock in the 20–18 win at Apia Park.

=== 2017 ===
In January, Sims signed a two-year contract with the Brisbane Broncos starting effective immediately, after being released from the final year of his Knights contract.

He made his Brisbane debut in round 1 of the 2017 season, starting at prop against the Cronulla-Sutherland Sharks, in Brisbane's 26–18 win at Shark Park. In round 6 against the Sydney Roosters, he scored his first try for the Brisbane club in their 32–8 win at Suncorp Stadium. On 6 May 2017, Sims played for Fiji against Tonga in the 2017 Pacific Cup, starting at lock in Fiji's 26–24 loss at Campbelltown Stadium.

In Round 25 against the Parramatta Eels, Sims suffered a season ending arm injury in Brisbane's 52–34 loss at Suncorp Stadium, later ruining his chances to play for Fiji in the 2017 Rugby League World Cup. Sims finished the 2017 NRL season with him playing in 22 matches and scoring 5 tries for the Brisbane club.

=== 2018 ===
In Round 2, in Brisbane's Queensland derby match against the North Queensland Cowboys, Sims played his 100th NRL career match in the 24–20 win at Suncorp Stadium.

On 18 July, Sims signed a three-year deal to join the St. George Illawarra Dragons starting in 2019. On 9 September, Sims endured a horror afternoon on the field against his future side St. George Illawarra as his brother Tariq ran past him on three occasions to score a hat-trick in the club's 48–18 defeat in week one of the finals eliminating Brisbane from the competition.

=== 2019 ===
Sims made his debut for St. George Illawarra against his former club the Brisbane Broncos scoring a try in a 25–24 victory at Suncorp Stadium. The following week, Sims was taken from the field with what was later to be revealed as a broken arm. Sims had remained on the field for a further 15 minutes after breaking his arm despite being in obvious discomfort. Sims was later ruled out for 8 weeks.

Sims made a total of 16 appearances for St. George Illawarra in the 2019 NRL season as the club suffered one of their worst ever seasons finishing in 15th place on the table.

=== 2020 ===
On 15 February, Sims suffered a broken arm whilst playing for St. George Illawarra in the pre-season NRL Nines tournament against Parramatta. Sims was seen by cameras leaving the field in emotional distress.

Sims was limited to only five games throughout the season as St. George Illawarra finished 13th on the table and missed out on the finals.

In November 2020, Sims signed a two-year deal with Hull Kingston Rovers in the Super League.

=== 2021 ===
Sims played 14 games for Hull Kingston Rovers in the 2021 Super League season as the club came within one game of the grand final.

=== 2022 ===
On 29 August, it was announced that Sims would be one of eleven players who were to depart Hull Kingston Rovers at the end of the 2022 season. On 30 August, Sims was suspended for three matches by the RFL. On the same day, Sims announced his retirement from Rugby League. Sims later came out of retirement to play for Fiji at the 2021 Rugby League World Cup. Sims played for Fiji in their controversial quarter final loss to New Zealand at the MKM Stadium. After the match, Sims announced his retirement for a second time.
