= Dylan Walker =

Australia international rugby league footballer (born 1994)

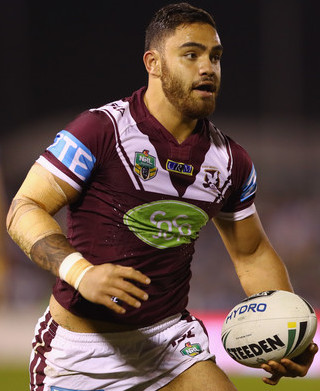

Personal information
- Born: 27 September 1994 (age 32) Sydney, New South Wales, Australia
- Height: 181 cm (5 ft 11 in)
- Weight: 99 kg (15 st 8 lb)

Playing information
- Position: Centre, Lock, Five-eighth
Club
Years	Team	Pld	T	G	FG	P
2013–15	South Sydney	62	33	2	0	136
2016–22	Manly Sea Eagles	124	32	40	0	208
2023–25	New Zealand Warriors	46	4	0	0	16
2025–26	Parramatta Eels	42	5	0	0	20
2027–	Leeds Rhinos	0	0	0	0	0
	Total	274	74	42	0	380
Representative
Years	Team	Pld	T	G	FG	P
2014	City Origin	1	0	0	0	0
2014	Australia	4	0	0	0	0
2015	NRL All Stars	1	1	0	0	4
2016	New South Wales	2	0	0	0	0
2017	Prime Minister's XIII	1	0	0	0	0
2020–24	Māori All Stars	4	1	0	0	4
- Source: As of 22 November 2026

Dylan Walker (born 27 September 1994) is a professional rugby league footballer who plays as a lock forward for the Leeds Rhinos in the Super League, and has played for Australia and the New Zealand Māori at international level.

He previously played for the South Sydney Rabbitohs, with whom he won the 2014 NRL Premiership and the Manly-Warringah Sea Eagles. Walker has played at representative level for City Origin, NRL All Stars, New South Wales and the Prime Minister's XIII.

== Background ==
Walker was born in Sydney, New South Wales, Australia.

Walker played his junior rugby league in the South Sydney Juniors competition for the Mascot Jets before being signed by the South Sydney Rabbitohs. Walker attended Matraville Sports High School and also played rugby union growing up. Walker played in the Rabbitohs NYC team in 2012–2013. In August 2012, Walker also played for the Australian Schoolboys.

Walker's mother is a Pitcairner/Cook Islander and his father is Maori. He is a direct descendant of Fletcher Christian on his mother's side.

== Playing career ==
=== South Sydney Rabbitohs (2013–2015) ===
==== Rookie year (2013) ====
On 20 April, Walker played for the New South Wales Under 20s team against the Queensland Under 20s team at centre in the Blues 36–12 win at Penrith Stadium. In Round 10, Walker made his NRL debut for the South Sydney Rabbitohs against the Wests Tigers at centre and scoring a try in South Sydney's 54–10 win at ANZ Stadium. Walker finished his promising debut year in the NRL with him playing in 16 matches, scoring 8 tries and kicking 1 goal.

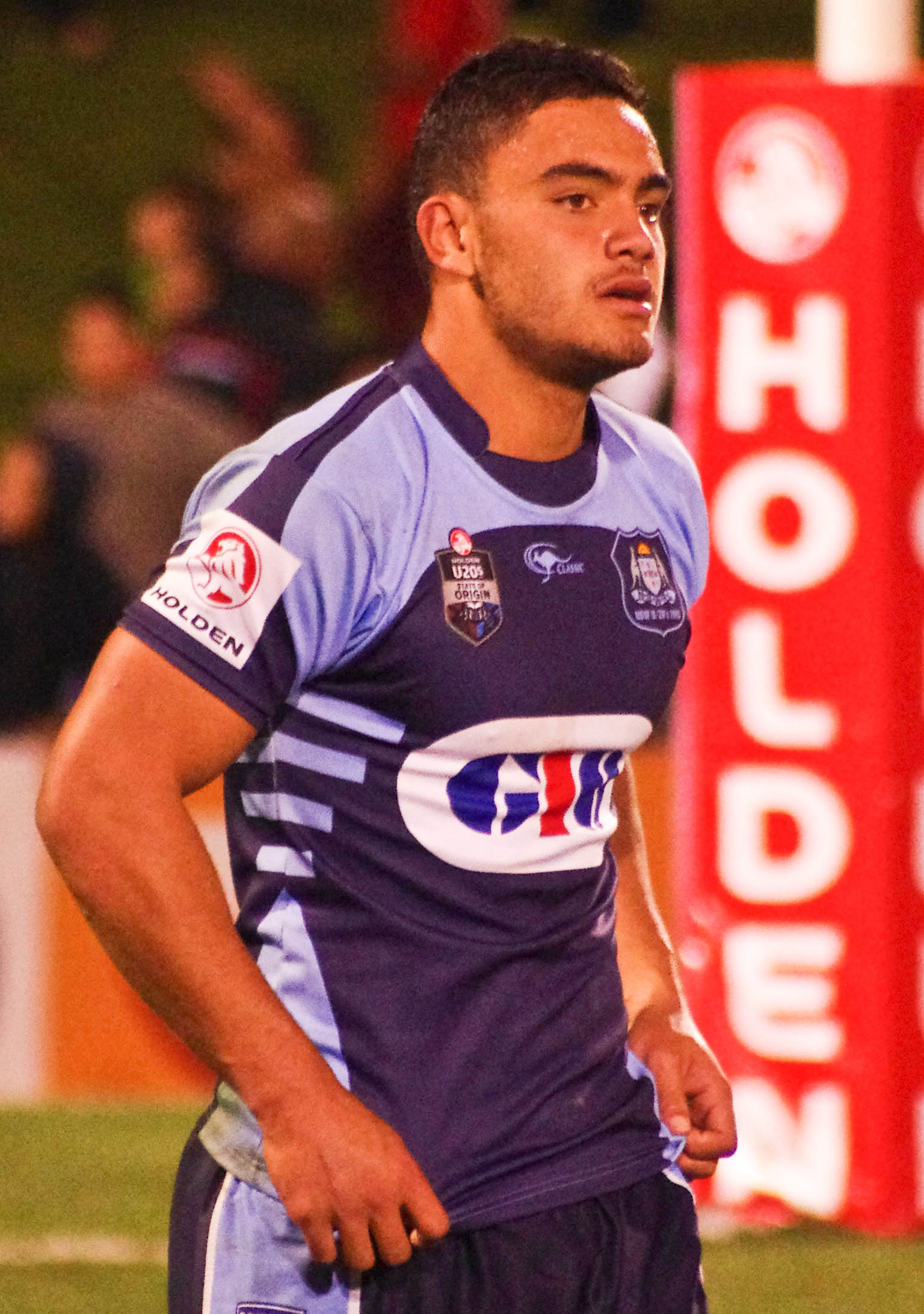
Walker playing for the NSW under-20s team in 2013

==== Representative debut season, & the end of South Sydney’s 47-year drought (2014) ====
On 14 February, Walker was named in Souths inaugural 2014 Auckland Nines squad. At the start of the 2014 NRL season, due to the new Souths five-eighth Luke Keary getting injured in the Nines tournament and John Sutton being shifted to play in the forwards, Walker was appointed to be five-eighth. Walker played five-eighth in his junior years.

He had his first start at five-eighth in round 1 against the Sydney Roosters where the South Sydney club won 28–8. Walker played at five-eighth till round 4, being shifted back to his preferred position at centre and John Sutton filling in at five-eighth until Keary returned from injury. On 4 May, Walker was selected to play at centre for City Origin against Country Origin in the 26–26 all draw in Dubbo. In Round 9 against the Gold Coast Titans, Walker scored 4 tries in South Sydney's 40–18 win.

Walker finished a breakout season playing in 24 games, scoring 12 tries and kicking 1 goal as Souths finished 2nd on the ladder. Walker scored a try in South's 40–24 qualifying final victory against Manly. Walker set up a try in Souths’ 32-22 preliminary final win against the Sydney Roosters. On 5 October, 2014 NRL Grand Final, Walker played at centre in South Sydney's 30–6 victory against the Canterbury-Bankstown Bulldogs.

On 14 October 2014, Walker was selected for the Australian Kangaroos 2014 Four Nations 24-man squad. Walker made his international debut against New Zealand at Suncorp Stadium, starting at centre then played at fullback in the 2nd half filling in for Greg Inglis in Australia's 30–12 loss. Walker played in all of Australia's 4 matches, including playing at centre in the 22–18 loss in the final against New Zealand at Westpac Stadium.

==== New South Wales debut overshadowed by off-field incidents, and a fresh start (2015) ====
On 23 January 2015, Walker was named in the South Sydney Rabbitohs tournament winning 2015 NRL Auckland Nines squad. On 13 February, Walker played centre for NRL All Stars for the 2015 All Stars match at Cbus Super Stadium. Walker scored a try in the side's 20–6 loss to the Indigenous All Stars. On 23 February 2015, Walker played for the Rabbitohs in the 2015 World Club Series match against 2014 Super League Grand Final premiers St. Helens, playing at centre and scored a try in South Sydney's 39–0 win at Langtree Park.

In the 2015 NRL season Round 1 opener against the Brisbane Broncos at Suncorp Stadium, Walker scored the first try of the 2015 season in South Sydney's 36–6 win. On 13 June 2015, Walker was included into the New South Wales Blues origin squad as 19th man leading up to Game 2 of the 2015 State of Origin series. Walker finished the 2015 NRL season with him playing in 22 matches and scoring 13 tries as South Sydney finished in 7th position on the ladder. Walker scored a try in Souths’ 26-12 loss to the Cronulla-Sutherland Sharks in Week 1 of the 2015 NRL finals.

In the early hours of 22 September 2015, Walker and fellow South Sydney teammate and best friend Aaron Gray were hospitalized after the pair overdosed on prescription drugs Oxycodone and Tramadol. The pair were discovered by another friend of them who alerted emergency services and the pair were sent to St Vincent's Hospital in a critical condition placed in induced comas. The pair were released from hospital three days later to front the media about the unfortunate situation. Later On 26 November, Walker was released from the final year of his Rabbitohs contract after requesting a release, after finding out that he was fined five percent of his contract and with the club unhappy with him for bringing it into disrepute.

On 17 December 2015, Walker signed with the Manly Warringah Sea Eagles on a four-year deal starting from 2016, after he was heavily linked to sign with them since his release from the Rabbitohs, putting the end to his tumultuous off season.

Although he had played most of his first-grade career in the centres, Manly coach Trent Barrett and Manly-Warringah legend and rugby league Immortal Bob Fulton, named Walker as the replacement five-eighth for New Zealand international half Kieran Foran, who left Manly for Parramatta. At the official announcement of his signing during a Manly pre-season training camp in Coffs Harbour, Walker told the Sydney Morning Herald "Five-eighth was my favourite position coming through the juniors and if the coach (Barrett) wants me there I will jump at the opportunity".

=== Manly-Warringah Sea Eagles (2016–2021) ===
==== Shift from centre to five-eighth, New South Wales representative debut (2016) ====
On 13 January, Walker was named in the emerging New South Wales Blues squad. In Round 1 of the 2016 NRL season, he made his club debut for Manly-Warringah against the Canterbury-Bankstown Bulldogs, starting at five-eighth in the Sea Eagles' 28–6 loss at Brookvale Oval. In Round 2 against the Wests Tigers, he scored his first club try for Manly in the 36–22 loss at Leichhardt Oval.

On 1 June, he made his debut for New South Wales against Queensland in Game 1 of the 2016 State of Origin series, coming off the interchange bench. He came onto the field at the 71st minute, and made an error shortly after.

In July 2016, Walker was fined $10,000 by Manly-Warringah after he punched his front door and injured his hand. Walker and his partner reported that he had punched the door out of frustration over an undisclosed incident. Walker was ruled out for a month as his hand required surgery.

Walker finished the 2016 NRL season playing in 18 games, scoring 8 tries and kicking 12 goals as Manly finished 13th on the ladder, which meant Walker would not qualify for the finals for the first time in his career.

==== Dally M Centre Of The Year (2017) ====
For the 2017 NRL season, Walker was shifted back to centre in the Manly side. In round 8 against Canberra, Walker missed a conversion to win the game for Manly in normal time and got into an on-field incident with Canberra player Josh Hodgson. In extra time, Walker kicked a penalty goal to win the game for Manly despite being heckled by the Canberra players behind the goal. On 28 June 2017 against Cronulla, Cronulla player Jayden Brailey attempted to tackle Walker but broke his jaw in two places as a result, Walker was seen on camera abusing Brailey as he left the field.

At the end of the 2017 NRL season, Walker was named Dally M Centre of the year, scoring 13 tries in 13 games, and kicking 28 goals as Manly finished the season in 6th position. Walker played at centre in Manly's loss in Week 1 of the finals to the Penrith Panthers. On 28 September 2017, Walker broke his leg and fractured his ankle while playing for The Australian Prime Ministers' XIII side.

==== Manly narrowly avoid the wooden spoon (2018) ====
In Round 11, Walker suffered a fractured eye socket after getting into a fist fight with Melbourne player Curtis Scott. According to the other players on the field, Walker had been heckling Scott for most of the game when the fight broke out in the second half. After the game scans revealed that Walker would be out for 6–8 weeks.

Walker finished the 2018 NRL season playing in 14 games (4 games at centre and 10 games at five-eighth) and scoring 2 tries as Manly failed to qualify for the finals, finishing in 15th position.

==== Another solid season en route to the finals (2019) ====
In round 10 of the 2019 NRL season, Walker played his first game of the season at centre and scored a try in his first game back from his suspension from the NRL due to an off-field incident. In Round 18, Walker shifted positions from centre to five-eighth, where he played for the rest of the year.

Walker made a total of 17 appearances for Manly in 2019 as the club finished 6th on the table and qualified for the finals. Walker played in both finals matches as the club reached the elimination semi-final against South Sydney in which Manly were defeated by his old club 34–26 at ANZ Stadium.

==== Māori All Stars debut and a mediocre season for Manly (2020) ====
On 22 February, Walker made his debut for the Māori All Stars and played at centre in their 30-16 victory over the Indigenous All Stars.

Walker played a total of seven games at five-eighth for Manly-Warringah in the 2020 NRL season as they finished a disappointing 13th on the table.

==== Playing at fullback, venturing into the forward pack adapting into a specialist utility and Manly’s best season finish in years (2021) ====
In Round 1, Walker started the 2021 NRL season at fullback where he played the first 5 games whilst Dally M Player of the Year, Tom Trbojevic was injured. Walker suffered a hamstring injury in round 5 against the Warriors just a week before Trbojevic returned from injury. In Round 14, he returned from injury against North Queensland and came off the interchange bench for the first time in his first-grade career where he was able to come on the field as an impact player. Walker continued to play the majority of his matches off the interchange bench for the rest of the season, which saw him play more games in the forward pack as well as starting to develop his role as a specialist utility. He also played a game at halfback in Round 17, against Canberra as captain Daly Cherry-Evans due to State of Origin.

Walker finished the season playing 20 games for Manly, and scoring 5 tries. Walker played off the interchange bench in the club's preliminary final loss against South Sydney.

==== Continuing to develop into a specialist utility (2022) ====
On 12 February, Walker played at centre in the Māori All Stars 16-10 victory in the 2022 All Stars Match. On 2 March, Walker signed a three-year deal to join the New Zealand Warriors starting in 2023.

Coming off the interchange bench for majority of games during the season, Walker played as a hooker and also a lock, fully developing into a specialist utility. Walker played a total of 19 games for Manly in the 2022 NRL season as the club finished 11th on the table and missed the finals. Walker's final game for Manly was a 21–20 loss to Canterbury in round 25 of the competition.

=== New Zealand Warriors (2023–25) ===
==== Return to career best form as a forward, and the ultimate utility (2023) ====
Walker made his club debut for New Zealand in round 1 of the 2023 NRL season against Newcastle.

Walker finished the 2023 NRL season playing in 24 games in his best season in many years. Walker's veteran experience and his versatility and ability to play multiple positions (prop, hooker, second row, lock, centre, halfback, or five-eighth) helped guide the New Zealand Warriors to their first top 4 ladder finish since 2008.

Due to a calf injury to starting halfback Shaun Johnson before Week 1 of the Finals, Walker was shifted to five-eighth in the New Zealand Warriors’ 32-6 loss to Penrith. In Week 2, Walker came off the interchange bench and scored a try in the New Zealand Warriors’ victory against the Newcastle Knights. Walker played off the bench and put in a strong performance in the clubs preliminary final loss to the Brisbane Broncos. Walker made 19 appearances for the New Zealand Warriors in the 2024 NRL season which saw the club finish 13th on the table.

=== Parramatta Eels (2025–26) ===
On 26 March the New Zealand Warriors announced Walker had been granted an early release from his contract to return home to Australia. Hours after the announcement, Parramatta announced that they had signed Walker for the rest of 2025 and the 2026 season. Walker made his club debut for Parramatta in their 23-22 golden point extra-time victory over St. George Illawarra. Walker played 20 matches for Parramatta in the 2025 NRL season as the club finished 11th on the table.

=== Leeds Rhinos (2027-) ===
On 6 July, Leeds Rhinos announced that they had signed Walker on a three-year deal starting in 2027.

== Statistics ==
Year	Club	Games	Tries	Goals	Pts
2013	South Sydney Rabbitohs	16	8	1	34
2014	South Sydney Rabbitohs	24	12	1	50
2015	South Sydney Rabbitohs	22	13	-	52
2016	Manly Warringah Sea Eagles	18	8	12	56
2017	Manly Warringah Sea Eagles	25	13	28	108
2018	Manly Warringah Sea Eagles	14	2	-	8
2019	Manly Warringah Sea Eagles	17	3	-	12
2020	Manly Warringah Sea Eagles	7	1	-	4
2021	Manly Warringah Sea Eagles	20	5	-	20
2022	Manly Warringah Sea Eagles	23	-	-	-
2023	New Zealand Warriors	24	3	-	8
2024	New Zealand Warriors	19	1		4
2025	New Zealand Warriors	3			
2025	Parramatta Eels	20	1		4
2026	Parramatta Eels	15	3		12
2027	Leeds Rhinos				
	Totals:	267	73	42	380

== Personal life ==
Walker and fellow Warriors teammate Jazz Tevaga are close friends, often referred to as the ‘Bald Brothers’.

Controversies

On 6 December 2018, Walker was arrested by police after allegedly assaulting his fiancée that day at their home in Sydney and was charged with domestic-related common assault. The NRL applied its new no-fault stand down policy, so Walker was suspended indefinitely. On 10 May 2019, at the court hearing, the magistrate dismissed the charges, saying she was not satisfied beyond a reasonable doubt that Walker had assaulted his partner. The NRL stated immediately that Walker was able to resume playing for Manly.

In November 2020, it was reported that Walker was involved in an altercation with two men outside a pizza restaurant in Sydney. Walker was later arrested and taken to Manly police station. On 18 November 2020, Walker pleaded not guilty to two counts of common assault. On 14 May 2021, Walker changed his plea to guilty but escaped conviction and was handed an 18-month conditional release.

On 6 August 2026, Walker was named by various social media pages including the Talking Parra Podcast and The Mole as the player who had been stood down for off-field issues by his club and the NRL. The Parramatta club later released a statement saying that the rumours were completely false and would be seeking legal action.
