= NRL All Stars team =

Representative rugby league team

NRL All Stars
Team information
- Governing body: Australian Rugby League Commission
- Head coach: Wayne Bennett
- Captain: Beau Scott
- Most caps: Benji Marshall

The NRL All Stars team was a rugby league football team made up of professional players in the National Rugby League. These players were selected by fan vote. However, fans were only allowed to select one player from each NRL team to join the Australian rugby league team captain and the New Zealand national rugby league team captain. Two other players were selected by the NRL All Stars coach. This team played in the annual NRL All Stars Game against the Indigenous All Stars. They were replaced in 2016 by a World All Stars.

== History ==
The first NRL All Stars team was assembled in 2010 All Stars Match to play against the Indigenous All Stars on 13 February. After a tight game the Indigenous All Stars won due to a last minute try from Jamie Soward. The final score was 16–12.

During the voting in 2010, the Australian rugby league team and New Zealand national rugby league team vice-captains, Cameron Smith and Adam Blair were selected by default but this rule was dropped the following year. The NRL All Stars were captained by Darren Lockyer in 2010 and 2011. Benji Marshall took over the role in 2012 after Lockyer's retirement. Wayne Bennett's Coach's choice selections in 2011 were Petero Civoniceva and Kurt Gidley and in 2012 were Luke Lewis and Ben Hornby. Ben Hornby was ruled out with injury and Bennett selected Hornby's Dragons teammate Nathan Fien to replace him.

For voting, there are two stages. First fans nominate two forwards and two backs from each club from the NRL to take part in stage 2. For stage 2, the coach selects a position for each of the selected players and it is the fans' job to form a team, with one player from each club only.

== Squads ==
=== 2010 ===
NRL All Stars
2010 squad		Coaching staff
1 Jarryd Hayne – FB; 2 Israel Folau – WG; 3 Michael Jennings – CE; 4 Matt Cooper – CE; 5 Manu Vatuvei – WG; 6 Darren Lockyer (c) – FE; 7 Benji Marshall – HB; 8 Adam Blair – PR; 9 Cameron Smith – HK; 10 Sam Burgess – PR; 11 Anthony Watmough – SR; 12 David Shillington – SR; 13 Luke O'Donnell – LK	14 Kurt Gidley – FB; 15 Anthony Tupou – SR; 16 Nate Myles – PR; 17 Robbie Farah – HK; 18 Luke Bailey – PR; 19 Josh Morris – CE; 20 Brett Finch – FE	Head coach: Wayne Bennett; Legend: (c) Captain(s); (vc) Vice-captain(s)

=== 2011 ===
NRL All Stars
2011 squad		Did not play	Coaching staff
1 Josh Dugan – FB; 2 Akuila Uate – WG; 3 Michael Jennings – CE; 4 Jamie Lyon – CE; 5 Brett Morris – WG; 6 Darren Lockyer (c) – FE; 7 Benji Marshall – HB; 8 Ben Hannant – PR; 9 Cameron Smith – HK; 10 Matthew Scott – PR; 11 Nathan Hindmarsh – SR; 12 Liam Fulton – SR; 13 Paul Gallen – LK	14 David Taylor – SR; 15 Ashley Harrison – LK; 16 Feleti Mateo – LK; 17 Shaun Kenny-Dowall – CE; 18 Michael Ennis – HK; 19 Petero Civoniceva – PR; 20 Kurt Gidley – FB	Gareth Ellis	Head coach: Wayne Bennett; Legend: (c) Captain(s); (vc) Vice-captain(s); Injured; Updated: 30 May 2011; Source(s): Half Time Live Scores, 2011 All Stars match, Team list

=== 2012 ===
NRL All Stars
2012 squad		Did not play	Coaching staff
1 Josh Dugan – FB; 2 Jason Nightingale – WG; 3 Jack Reed – CE; 4 Michael Jennings – CE; 5 Manu Vatuvei – WG; 6 Benji Marshall (c) – FE; 7 Cooper Cronk – HB; 8 Kade Snowden – PR; 9 Aaron Payne – HK; 10 Luke Bailey – PR; 11 Nathan Hindmarsh – SR; 12 David Taylor – SR; 13 Paul Gallen – LK	14 Adam Blair – SR; 15 Frank Pritchard – SR; 16 Jared Waerea-Hargreaves – PR; 17 Anthony Watmough – SR; 18 Brent Tate – CE; 19 Luke Lewis – LK; 20 Nathan Fien – HK	Cameron Smith; Tony Williams; Ben Hornby	Head coach: Wayne Bennett; Legend: (c) Captain(s); (vc) Vice-captain(s); Injured

=== 2013 ===
NRL All Stars
2013 squad		Coaching staff
1 Jarryd Hayne – FB; 2 Akuila Uate – WG; 3 Shaun Kenny-Dowall – CE; 4 Josh Morris – CE; 5 Brett Morris – WG; 6 Benji Marshall (c) – FE; 7 Adam Reynolds – HB; 8 James Tamou – PR; 9 Cameron Smith – HK; 10 Ben Hannant – PR; 11 David Shillington – SR; 12 Ashley Harrison – SR; 13 Chris Heighington – LK	14 Robbie Farah – HK; 15 Tim Grant – PR; 16 Kieran Foran – FE; 17 Feleti Mateo – SR; 18 Justin O'Neill – FB; 19 Willie Mason – PR; 20 Shaun Johnson – HB	Head coach: Wayne Bennett; Legend: (c) Captain(s); (vc) Vice-captain(s)

=== 2015 ===
NRL All Stars
2015 squad		Coaching staff
1 Matt Moylan – FB; 2 Manu Vatuvei – WG; 3 Jarrod Croker – CE; 4 Dylan Walker – CE; 5 Antonio Winterstein – WG; 6 Kieran Foran – FE; 7 Mitchell Pearce – HB; 8 James Graham – PR; 9 Nathan Friend – HK; 10 Jared Waerea-Hargreaves – PR; 11 Beau Scott (c) – SR; 12 Jason Taumalolo – SR; 13 Paul Gallen – LK	14 Jesse Bromwich – PR; 15 Luke Brooks – HB; 16 Joseph Paulo – LK; 17 Trent Merrin – PR; 18 Corey Parker – LK; 19 Jeremy Smith – LK; 20 Dave Taylor – SR	Head coach: Wayne Bennett; Legend: (c) Captain(s); (vc) Vice-captain(s)

== See also ==
- List of NRL All Stars players
