= 2026 NRL finals series =

- Duration: 11 September – 4 October 2026
- Teams: 8
- Premiers: Sydney Roosters (16th title)
- Minor premiers: Penrith Panthers (6th title)
- Matches played: 9
- Broadcast partners: Nine Network; Fox League

The 2026 National Rugby League finals series is a tournament staged to determine the winner of the 2026 Telstra Premiership season. The series is being played over four weekends in September and October, culminating in the 2026 NRL Grand Final on 4 October 2026.

The top eight teams from the 2026 NRL season qualified for the finals series. NRL finals series have been continuously played under this format since 2012.

== Qualification ==
| Pos | Team | Pld | W | D | L | B | PF | PA | PD | Pts | Qualification |
|---|---|---|---|---|---|---|---|---|---|---|---|
| 1 | Penrith Panthers | 24 | 18 | 0 | 6 | 3 | 683 | 347 | +336 | 42 | Advance to finals series |
| 2 | New Zealand Warriors | 24 | 18 | 0 | 6 | 3 | 728 | 418 | +310 | 42 | Advance to finals series |
| 3 | Dolphins | 24 | 17 | 0 | 7 | 3 | 662 | 506 | +156 | 40 | Advance to finals series |
| 4 | Sydney Roosters (P) | 24 | 16 | 0 | 8 | 3 | 619 | 501 | +118 | 38 | Advance to finals series |
| 5 | Cronulla-Sutherland Sharks | 24 | 14 | 0 | 10 | 3 | 672 | 523 | +149 | 34 | Advance to finals series |
| 6 | South Sydney Rabbitohs | 24 | 14 | 0 | 10 | 3 | 694 | 581 | +113 | 34 | Advance to finals series |
| 7 | Newcastle Knights | 24 | 14 | 0 | 10 | 3 | 633 | 591 | +42 | 34 | Advance to finals series |
| 8 | North Queensland Cowboys | 24 | 13 | 0 | 11 | 3 | 568 | 652 | −84 | 32 | Advance to finals series |
| 9 | Manly Warringah Sea Eagles | 24 | 11 | 0 | 13 | 3 | 623 | 524 | +99 | 28 | |
| 10 | Melbourne Storm | 24 | 11 | 0 | 13 | 3 | 594 | 576 | +18 | 28 | |
| 11 | Canberra Raiders | 24 | 11 | 0 | 13 | 3 | 581 | 626 | −45 | 28 | |
| 12 | Canterbury-Bankstown Bulldogs | 24 | 11 | 0 | 13 | 3 | 476 | 536 | −60 | 28 | |
| 13 | Parramatta Eels | 24 | 9 | 0 | 15 | 3 | 497 | 678 | −181 | 24 | |
| 14 | Brisbane Broncos | 24 | 8 | 0 | 16 | 3 | 471 | 677 | −206 | 22 | |
| 15 | Wests Tigers | 24 | 8 | 0 | 16 | 3 | 445 | 699 | −254 | 22 | |
| 16 | Gold Coast Titans | 24 | 6 | 0 | 18 | 3 | 477 | 663 | −186 | 18 | |
| 17 | St. George Illawarra Dragons | 24 | 5 | 0 | 19 | 3 | 392 | 717 | −325 | 16 | |

Source: National Rugby League
Rules for classification: 1) competition points; 2) points differential; 3) percentage; (Note: Greater percentage of points scored for and against, being determined by points scored for divided by points scored against expressed as a percentage.) 4) tries scored; (Note: Further tiebreakers (in order) include goals scored, field goals kicked; least amount of penalties conceded.)
(P) Premiers

== Finals structure ==
The system used for the 2026 NRL finals series is a final eight system. The top four teams in the eight receive the "double chance" when they play in week-one qualifying finals, such that if a top-four team loses in the first week it still remains in the finals, playing a semi-final the next week against the winner of an elimination final. The bottom four of the eight play knock-out games – only the winners survive and move on to the next week. Home ground advantage goes to the team with the higher ladder position in the first two weeks and to the qualifying final winners in the third week.

In the second week, the winners of the qualifying finals receive a bye to the third week. The losers of the qualifying final play the elimination final winners in a semi-final. In the third week, the winners of the semi-finals from week two play the winners of the qualifying finals in the first week. The winners of those matches move on to the Grand Final.

=== Bracket ===
Qualifying and elimination finals
13 September – Sydney
1 | Penrith | 19
4 | Sydney | 12
12 September – Sydney
5 | Cronulla-Sutherland | 26
8 | North Queensland | 16
11 September – Sydney
6 | South Sydney | 10
7 | Newcastle | 20
12 September – Auckland
2 | New Zealand | 16
3 | Dolphins | 26

Semi-finals
19 September – Sydney
Sydney | 46
Cronulla-Sutherland | 10
20 September – Auckland
New Zealand | 10
Newcastle | 12

Preliminary finals
27 September – Sydney
Penrith | 14
Newcastle | 22
25 September – Brisbane
Dolphins | 20
Sydney | 36

Grand final
4 October – Sydney
Sydney | 19
Newcastle | 18

=== Matches ===
| Home | Score | Away | Match Information |
| Home | Score | Away | Date and time (AEST) | Venue | Referee | Attendance | Nine viewership |
|---|---|---|---|---|---|---|---|
Qualifying and Elimination Finals
| South Sydney Rabbitohs | 10–20 | Newcastle Knights | 11 September, 19:50 | Allianz Stadium | Ashley Klein | 28,152 | 937,000 |
| New Zealand Warriors | 16–26 | Dolphins | 12 September, 16:05 | Go Media Stadium | Adam Gee | 26,131 | 706,000 |
| Cronulla-Sutherland Sharks | 26–16 | North Queensland Cowboys | 12 September, 19:50 | Allianz Stadium | Grant Atkins | 17,429 | 799,000 |
| Penrith Panthers | 19–12 | Sydney Roosters | 13 September, 16:05 | CommBank Stadium | Gerard Sutton | 22,148 | 998,000 |
Semi-Finals
| Sydney Roosters | 46-10 | Cronulla-Sutherland Sharks | 19 September, 19:50 | Allianz Stadium | Adam Gee | 39,147 | 918,000 |
| New Zealand Warriors | 10–12 | Newcastle Knights | 20 September, 16:05 | Eden Park | Ashley Klein | 48,511 | 1,088,000 |
Preliminary Finals
| Dolphins | 20–36 | Sydney Roosters | 25 September, 19:50 | Suncorp Stadium | Adam Gee | 52,286 | 1,312,000 |
| Penrith Panthers | 14–22 | Newcastle Knights | 27 September, 16:05 | Accor Stadium | Gerard Sutton | 57,102 | 1,590,000 |

==== First week: Qualifying and Elimination Finals ====
Second Elimination Final

11 September 2026
19:50 AEST (UTC+10)

| South Sydney Rabbitohs | 10–20 | Newcastle Knights |
|---|---|---|
| Tries: 2 Graham 35'; Gray 74'; Goals: 1 Mitchell 36' | 1st: 6–10; 2nd: 4–10; Report | Tries: 4 McEwen 4', 61'; Gagai 25'; Young 65'; Goals: 2 Smith 27', 62' |

Allianz Stadium, Sydney
Attendance: 28,152
Referee: Ashley Klein

Second Qualifying Final

12 September 2026
18:05 NZST (UTC+12)

| New Zealand Warriors | 16–26 | Dolphins |
|---|---|---|
| Tries: 1 Tuaupiki 15'; Goals: 6 Tuaupiki 8', 16', 20', 40', 50', 52'; Sin bin: Pompey (yellow card) 28' to 38'; Capewell (yellow card) 33' to 43' | 1st: 12–8; 2nd: 4–18; Report | Tries: 4 Cobbo 25'; Farnworth 60'; Tabuai-Fidow 66'; Bostock 74'; Goals: 5 Isaako 12', 27', 62', 68', 76'; Sin bin: Cobbo (yellow card) 33' to 43' |

Go Media Stadium, Auckland
Attendance: 26,131
Referee: Adam Gee

First Elimination Final

12 September 2026
19:50 AEST (UTC+10)

| Cronulla-Sutherland Sharks | 26–16 | North Queensland Cowboys |
|---|---|---|
| Tries: 5 Talakai 19'; Katoa 31', 48'; Kennedy 60'; Hynes 65'; Goals: 3 Hynes 5', 20', 66' | 1st: 12–6; 2nd: 14–10; Report | Tries: 3 Burns 26'; Laybutt 56'; Purdue 71'; Goals: 2 Drinkwater 27', 57' |

Allianz Stadium, Sydney
Attendance: 17,429
Referee: Grant Atkins

First Qualifying Final

13 September 2026
16:05 AEST (UTC+10)

| Penrith Panthers | 19–12 | Sydney Roosters |
|---|---|---|
| Tries: 3 Martin 11'; Edwards 35'; To'o 77'; Goals: 3 Cleary 12', 37'; Edwards 78'; Field goals: 1 Cleary 70'; Sin bin: Cleary (yellow card) 39' to 49' | 1st: 12–12; 2nd: 7–0; Report | Tries: 2 Toia 21'; Nawaqanitawase 26'; Goals: 2 Savala 21', 26' |

CommBank Stadium, Sydney
Attendance: 22,148
Referee: Gerard Sutton

==== Second week: Semi-Finals ====
First Semi-Final

19 September 2026
19:50 AEST (UTC+10)

| Sydney Roosters | 46–10 | Cronulla-Sutherland Sharks |
|---|---|---|
| Tries: 8 Collins 1'; Tupou 10'; Cherry-Evans 27'; Watson 51'; Nawaqanitawase 62', 71'; Toia 65'; Tedesco 68'; Goals: 7 Savala 3', 12', 29', 52', 64', 67', 73' | 1st: 18–10; 2nd: 28–0; Report | Tries: 2 Katoa 21'; Mulitalo 23'; Goals: 1 Trindall 25' |

Allianz Stadium, Sydney
Attendance: 39,147
Referee: Adam Gee

Second Semi-Final

20 September 2026
18:05 NZST (UTC+12)

| New Zealand Warriors | 10–12 | Newcastle Knights |
|---|---|---|
| Tries: 2 Halasima 12', 69'; Goals: 1 Tuaupiki 14' | 1st: 6–6; 2nd: 4–6; Report | Tries: 2 Sharpe 28'; Young 44'; Goals: 2 Smith 30', 46' |

Eden Park, Auckland
Attendance: 42,000
Referee: Ashley Klein

==== Third week: Preliminary Finals ====
Second Preliminary Final

25 September 2026
19:50 AEST (UTC+10)

| Dolphins | 20–36 | Sydney Roosters |
|---|---|---|
| Tries: 4 Isaako 33', 42'; Finefeuiaki 74'; Farnworth 76'; Goals: 2 Isaako 34', 76' | 1st: 6–16; 2nd: 14–20; Report | Tries: 7 Nawaqanitawase 17', 56'; Radley 23'; Tupou 26'; Toia 45'; Collins 54'; Walker 66'; Goals: 4 Walker 18', 24'; Daly Cherry-Evans 47', 55' |

Suncorp Stadium, Brisbane
Attendance: 52,286
Referee: Adam Gee

First Preliminary Final

27 September 2026
16:05 AEST (UTC+10)

| Penrith Panthers | 14–22 | Newcastle Knights |
|---|---|---|
| Tries: 2 Talagi 11'; Smith 38'; Goals: 2 Edwards 13'; Talagi 35', 39' | 1st: 14–6; 2nd: 0-16; Report | Tries: 4 Manuleleua 7'; Young 41'; Smith 58', 79'; Goals: 3 Smith 8', 60', 79'; Sent off: Crossland (red card) 35' |

Accor Stadium, Sydney
Attendance: 57,102
Referee: Gerard Sutton

=== Grand Final ===
2026 NRL Grand Final

Sunday, 4 October
19:30 AEDT (UTC+11)

| Sydney Roosters | 19 – 18 | Newcastle Knights |
|---|---|---|
| Tries: 3 Nawaqanitawase 36', 60'; B. Smith 48'; Goals: 3 Walker 38', 49', pen 55' (3/4); Field goals: 1 Cherry-Evans 70' (1/1) | 1st: 6–12; 2nd: 13–6; Report | Tries: 3 Manuleleua 16'; Ponga 30'; Marzhew 76'; Goals: 3 S. Smith 17', 32', 76' (3/3) |

Accor Stadium, Sydney
Attendance: 80,814
Referee: Adam Gee
Video referee: Chris Butler
Touch judges: Tyson Brough, Phil Henderson
Clive Churchill Medal: James Tedesco
