= 2026 State of Origin series =

Australian rugby league series

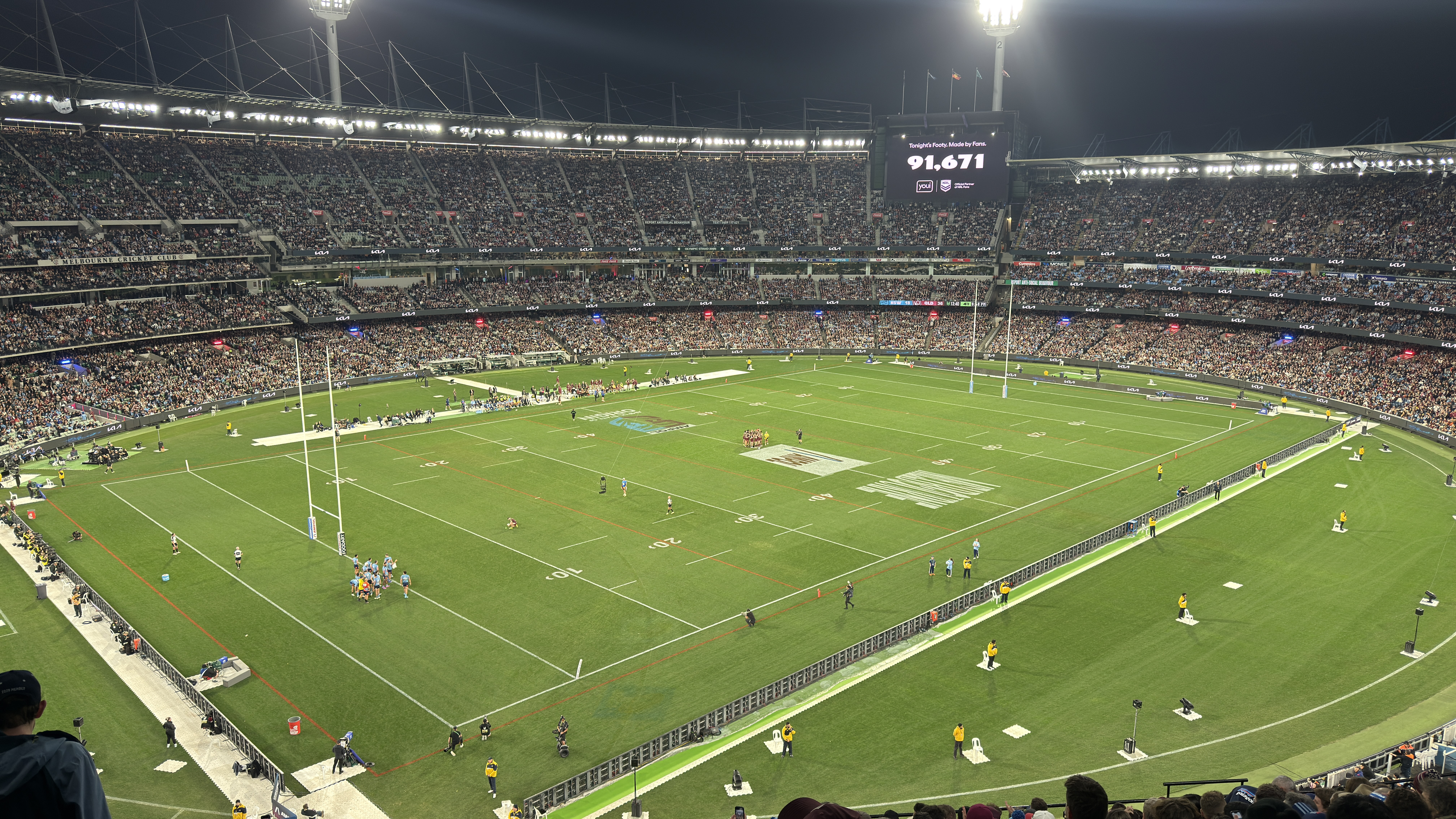
- A record attendance of 91,671 at the MCG for the second match of the series
- Won by: New South Wales (18th title)
- Series margin: 2–1
- Points scored: 152
- Attendance: 223,309 (ave. 74,436 per match)
- Player of the series: Nathan Cleary (Wally Lewis Medal)
- Top points scorer(s): Nathan Cleary (36)
- Top try scorer(s): Selwyn Cobbo (4)

The 2026 State of Origin series was the 45th annual best-of-three series between the Queensland and New South Wales men's rugby league teams. Before this series, Queensland had won 25 times, and New South Wales 17 times, with two series drawn. The first game was hosted at Accor Stadium on 27 May. The Melbourne Cricket Ground hosted the second match of the series and its seventh ever State of Origin match, attracting a record Origin crowd of 91,671. Suncorp Stadium hosted the third and deciding match of the series after both sides won a game apiece.

== Game I ==
In the lead up to the first match of the series, New South Wales coach Laurie Daley selected a 20-man squad which included six possible debutants. Those included Tongan international Tolu Koula, hooker Blayke Brailey, and following changes to the eligibility rules, New Zealand international Addin Fonua-Blake and England international Victor Radley. Former NSW captain James Tedesco returned to the squad after not being selected since game one of the 2024 series, with Penrith Panthers fullback Dylan Edwards dropped from the squad.

For Queensland, coach Billy Slater overlooked 2025 Clive Churchill Medal winner Reece Walsh in favour of Kalyn Ponga. Slater selected Sam Walker at halfback to replace injured North Queensland Cowboys halfback Tom Dearden who had won the Wally Lewis Medal in 2025. Slater also named a number of potential debutants as well as New Zealand international Briton Nikora. Days after his diagnosis with Motor Neuron Disease and subsequent immediate retirement from the sport, Queensland made former Origin player Jai Arrow their honorary "20th man."

During the team preparations, NSW halfback Mitchell Moses was ruled out of the match due to a hamstring injury. In his place Ethan Strange was elevated to the starting line-up to make his Origin debut.

Referee Ashley Klein was appointed to officiate his 21st Origin match, equalling the record of Bill Harrigan. It was Klein's thirteenth consecutive appointment to officiate a State of Origin match.

Wednesday, 27 May
20:05 AEST (UTC+10)

New South Wales	22–20	Queensland
Tries: 4 Young 27'; Strange 63'; Cleary 72'; Tedesco 79'; Goals: 3 Cleary (3/4) 28', 73', 80'	1st: 6–20; 2nd: 16–0; Report	Tries: 3 Toia 10'; Flegler 14'; Tabuai-Fidow 17'; Goals: 4 Walker (4/4) 11', 16', 19', pen 21'; Sent off: Ponga (red card) 57'

Accor Stadium, Sydney
Attendance: 79,186
Referee: Ashley Klein
Video referee: Chris Butler
Touch judges: Matt Noyen, Phil Henderson
Player of the Match: Nathan Cleary (New South Wales)

Team details
New South Wales		Position	Queensland
Name	Number	Position	Number	Name
James Tedesco	1	Fullback	1	Kalyn Ponga
Brian To'o	2	Wing	2	Selwyn Cobbo
Stephen Crichton	3	Centre	3	Robert Toia
Kotoni Staggs	4	Centre	4	Hamiso Tabuai-Fidow
Tolu Koula	5	Wing	5	Jojo Fifita
Ethan Strange	18	Five eighth	6	Cameron Munster (c)
Nathan Cleary	7	Half back	7	Sam Walker
Addin Fonua-Blake	8	Prop forward	8	Thomas Flegler
Reece Robson	9	Hooker	9	Harry Grant
Mitchell Barnett	10	Prop forward	10	Tino Fa'asuamaleaui
Hudson Young	11	Second row	11	Reuben Cotter
Haumole Olakau'atu	12	Second row	12	Kurt Capewell
Isaah Yeo (c)	13	Lock forward	13	Max Plath
Cameron Murray	14	Interchange	14	Briton Nikora
Victor Radley	15	Interchange	15	Lindsay Collins
Blayke Brailey	17	Interchange	16	Patrick Carrigan
Casey McLean	19	Interchange	17	Trent Loiero
Matt Burton	18	Replacement
Laurie Daley		Coach		Billy Slater
NRL.com

External videos
- Game I full replay on the NRL's official YouTube channel

In wet conditions at Accor Stadium, Robert Toia scored the first try of the match in the tenth minute, grounding the ball in the in-goal area following a deft grubber kick from Sam Walker. The try was converted by Walker to give Queensland a 6–0 lead. The Maroons doubled their lead in the 14th minute after Queensland's backline through Kalyn Ponga, Selwyn Cobbo, and Hamiso Tabuai-Fidow set up Queensland with field position following a high kick from Nathan Cleary that went uncontested at the back. Prop forward Thomas Flegler scoring the try adjacent to the posts, running off a pass from Walker after Harry Grant broke out of a tackle to offload. Queensland scored a third straight try in the 17th minute when Tabuai-Fidow grounded the ball from a Cameron Munster grubber kick that bounced through the NSW line. Queensland's lead inside the first 20 minutes was 18–0.

Another error from NSW provided Queensland with an opportunity to extend their lead, Walker converting a penalty goal attempt for Queensland to take the score to 20–0.

A big tackle from Blues debutant Ethan Strange on Queensland captain Munster in the 33rd minute forced an error when it looked like the Maroons could score again. That tackle seemed to spark the Blues who went down the field to score their first try through Hudson Young. The forward diving onto the ball after chasing through a kick from Cleary that looked to be heading towards the dead-ball line. Cleary converted the try to bring the score to 20–6, which would be the half time score with no further points added in the final ten minutes before the break. Queensland had 55% of the possession in the first half, completing 85% of their sets, while the Blues had completed 76% of their sets.

Queensland fullback Kalyn Ponga was controversially sent off in the 57th minute for a shoulder charge on NSW winger Tolu Koula. Ponga was the seventh player to be sent off in Origin history, and the fourth in three years by referee Ashley Klein. Some commentators like Corey Parker and Greg Alexander suggesting that Klein should have sent Ponga to the sin bin for 10 minutes, rather than making a "game-changing moment." The NRL later backed the decision of Klein to send off Ponga after Koula suffered a concussion from the incident, with Ponga also fined 23% off his match payment under the NRL Judiciary rules governing Origin matches.

Following the send off of Ponga, and the subsequent melee, NSW were able to heavily attack the Queensland line. Strange looked to have scored his first Origin try after bumping out of tackle from Munster close to the line, but the try was disallowed by the video referee for an obstruction play from Haumole Olakau'atu on Grant. A few minutes later another chance for NSW was squandered due to a forward pass from Stephen Crichton. The Blues would not be denied when Crichton made a break down the flank, passing back to Strange to score in the 63rd minute. Cleary missed the conversion attempt to make the score 20–10.

After another break out wide, NSW bombed a clear try scoring opportunity when Olakau'atu could not cleanly handle a low pass from James Tedesco, knocking the ball forward in the wet conditions. With a ten-point lead entering the final ten minutes of the match, Queensland were trying to hang on to their advantage. A 40–20 kick from Cleary that went close to the Queensland 10m line gave NSW advantageous field position. Cleary scored NSW's third try in the 72nd minute, running a diagonal line to score close to the posts from a pass from Blayke Brailey.

With 100 seconds remaining, a midfield high kick from Cleary positioned just outside the 30m line landed just short of the Queensland line, Tedesco outjumping Tabuai-Fidow to the ball to pivot over the line to score the try to level the match. Cleary converted the try with seconds remaining to win the match 22–20.

For his role in the second half comeback, NSW halfback Nathan Cleary was named the player of the match. Cleary scored a try, kicked a key 40–20 kick and had two try assists.

== Game II ==
Leading in the series, NSW made a number of changes to their squad for the second match of the series played at the Melbourne Cricket Ground (MCG). After missing the first match with a knee injury, prop forward Payne Haas returned to the starting team, as did Mitchell Moses after recovering from a hamstring strain. Moses had not played a NRL match since mid-May. The selection of Moses meant that Ethan Strange moved out of the starting lineup, despite his try in the first match in Sydney. Coach Laurie Daley suggested in the lead-up that he would use Strange off the bench in the forward pack.

Initially selected in the NSW squad to replace the injured Stephen Crichton, centre Casey McLean was forced to withdraw after suffering a quadriceps injury during team preparations. The injury forced a reshuffle to the NSW backline, with Mark Nawaqanitawase moving from the reserves to the wing to make his Origin debut, with Tolu Koula shifted to his preferred position at centre. Despite his good form for Manly, NSW forward Haumole Olakau'atu was relegated to 20th man, with Newcastle Knights forward Dylan Lucas elevated to the squad to make his Origin debut.

Queensland made only minimal changes to its squad for the match in Melbourne. Dolphins forward Kulikefu Finefeuiaki was named to make his Origin debut, replacing Patrick Carrigan who suffered an ankle injury playing for the Brisbane Broncos after the first match of the series. Carrigan was expected to miss a number of NRL matches after having surgery to repair an ankle syndesmosis injury.

Coach Billy Slater brought in Reece Walsh and Murray Taulagi as potential interchange players in place of Ezra Mam and Gehamat Shibasaki. Slater suggesting before the match that Walsh could have a 'roving role' should he be utilised from the bench.

In the days before the match, the father of Tino Fa'asuamaleaui, Fereti died from cancer. Fa'asuamaleaui remained with his family before the match, travelling to Melbourne to rejoin his teammates to take his place in the Queensland team.

Despite the controversy around decisions made during Game I and an online petition which garnered over 25,000 signatures, Ashley Klein was appointed as the referee. Both coaches voiced their support for Klein before the match after Klein's gambling history was revealed in the media.

Wednesday, 17 June
20:05 AEST (UTC+10)

New South Wales	24–44	Queensland
Tries: 4 Staggs 7'; Nawaqanitawase 21', 60'; Barnett 78'; Goals: 4 Cleary (4/4) 9', 23', 61', 78'; Sin bin: Staggs (yellow card) 64' to 74'	1st: 12–8; 2nd: 12–38; Report	Tries: 7 Loiero 27'; Cobbo 47', 52', 72'; Fifita 56'; Tabuai-Fidow 63'; Collins 66'; Goals: 8 Walker (8/8) pen 6', 27', 47', 53', 57', 63', 66', 72'

Melbourne Cricket Ground, Melbourne
Attendance: 91,671
Referee: Ashley Klein
Video referee: Chris Butler
Touch judges: Matt Noyen, Phil Henderson
Player of the Match: Sam Walker (Queensland)

Team details
New South Wales		Position	Queensland
Name	Number	Position	Number	Name
James Tedesco	1	Fullback	1	Kalyn Ponga
Brian To'o	2	Wing	2	Selwyn Cobbo
Tolu Koula	3	Centre	3	Robert Toia
Kotoni Staggs	4	Centre	4	Hamiso Tabuai-Fidow
Mark Nawaqanitawase	5	Wing	5	Jojo Fifita
Mitchell Moses	6	Five eighth	6	Cameron Munster (c)
Nathan Cleary	7	Half back	7	Sam Walker
Payne Haas	8	Prop forward	8	Thomas Flegler
Reece Robson	9	Hooker	9	Harry Grant
Mitchell Barnett	10	Prop forward	10	Tino Fa'asuamaleaui
Hudson Young	11	Second row	11	Briton Nikora
Dylan Lucas	12	Second row	12	Kurt Capewell
Isaah Yeo (c)	13	Lock forward	13	Reuben Cotter
Cameron Murray	14	Interchange	14	Max Plath
Victor Radley	15	Interchange	15	Lindsay Collins
Addin Fonua-Blake	16	Interchange	16	Kulikefu Finefeuiaki
Ethan Strange	18	Interchange	17	Trent Loiero
Laurie Daley		Coach		Billy Slater
NRL.com

External videos
- Game II full replay on the NRL's official YouTube channel

In clear conditions, a new record for an Origin match of 91,671 people were in attendance at the MCG.

After receiving the ball from the kickoff, Queensland received the first penalty of the match in the fifth minute when Nathan Cleary was ruled to have impeded Harry Grant while covering at marker in defence. Sam Walker took the penalty shot at goal from about 18m from the line adjacent to the goal posts to give Queensland a 2–0 lead. From the restart, Maroons forward Thomas Flegler immediate dropped the ball, with Blues winger Mark Nawaqanitawase picking up the loose ball. Nawaqanitawase offloaded in a desperate three-man Queensland tackle to Kotoni Staggs to dive over and score a try. Cleary kicked the conversion attempt from near the sideline to hand NSW an unlikely 6–2 lead.

A high tackle from NSW forward Hudson Young on Walker sparked a melee in the 15th minute, after Briton Nikora took exception to the tackle from Young. In the 21st minute, a grubber kick from Cleary ricocheted back to him off the Queensland defenders close to their line, the halfback able to pass the ball out to an unmarked Nawaqanitawase to dive over to score a try in the corner. With a successful conversion, NSW extended their lead to 12–2.

With less than 15 minutes to play before half time, a fluid passing movement that started inside their own half, Queensland's Hamiso Tabuai-Fidow brushed off two defenders near midfield to give the Maroons attacking field position. On the next play, Harry Grant caught NSW on the short side, passing to Cameron Munster who was able to offload for Walker. The halfback combining with Max Plath to send Trent Loiero to cross the line for his first Origin try. Queensland cut the scoreboard deficit to four points, although captain Munster was temporarily forced from the field for a head injury assessment. Mark Nawaqanitawase went close to scoring a second try for NSW in the 30th minute, but planted the ball on the touch in-goal line under pressure from Selwyn Cobbo. In the final minutes of the first half both teams had chances to score, only for strong defence to deny those opportunities. NSW would lead 12–8 at the break.

After half time, Queensland took the lead in the 47th minute when Selwyn Cobbo scored the first of his three tries for the match. Cobbo dived over the line to score in the corner following a fifth tackle play that included two kicks, latching onto the second from Munster. Cobbo had his second try five minutes later when Queensland put together a set play from a scrum win 10m out from the NSW line. Fullback Kalyn Ponga was heavily involved in the play, with Cobbo able to beat the tackle from Nawaqanitawase to score. Walker's successful conversion attempt providing the Maroons with a 18–12 advantage. Queensland were full of running and a line break from Grant set up another try on the next play when Munster launched a cross-field kick for Jojo Fifita to acrobatically outjump Brian To'o to score on Queensland's right edge.

NSW were able to score the next try through Nawaqanitawase in the 60th minute, the winger showing footwork to dive over in the corner for his second try. That try was converted by Cleary to bring the Blues deficit to eight points. Queensland were able to hit back shortly after when Hamiso Tabuai-Fidow picked up a grubber kick from Cobbo to score his 13th Origin try. In the lead up to the try, NSW centre Kotoni Staggs tackled Ponga high after the fullback had passed the ball to spark another melee. Referee Ashley Klein sent Staggs to the sin bin following the incident.

With a man advantage, Queensland quickly added two more tries through Lindsay Collins, with Cobbo completing his hat-trick#Rugby union and rugby league in the 72nd minute. NSW scored a late consolation try with two minutes remaining after Mitch Barnett crashed over beneath the posts to score his first Origin try.

Queensland had scored six tries in 25 minutes during the second half, with NSW conceding seven line breaks and making 12 errors for the match. Queensland coach Slater praising his players saying after the match "we have 19 team leaders in our team and everyone is accountable and has a role and when we get it right we are hard to handle."

Queensland halfback Sam Walker was awarded the player of the match award, kicking a penalty goal and converting all seven of Queensland's tries to score 16 points. He also led the Maroons with 446 kick metres.

The match was the seventh Origin fixture to be played at the Melbourne Cricket Ground, with Queensland's victory ending a four-match losing streak at the venue. Following the match, a heartbroken Tino Fa'asuamaleaui revealed that he had honoured advice from his father to "play hard."

== Game III ==
Ahead of the third match of the series, Queensland brought back Patrick Carrigan, Corey Horsburgh and Jeremiah Nanai into their 20-man squad. Nanai had returned from a shoulder injury to be selected in the team, while Carrigan had missed the second match due to an ankle injury. Queensland were forced to leave out prop forward Lindsay Collins, who was ruled out after suffering a concussion.

New South Wales coach Laurie Daley made a number changes to his squad, dropping winger Brian To'o, outside back Kotoni Staggs and forwards Dylan Lucas and Api Koroisau. In their places, Dolphins centre Jack Bostock was selected to start his first origin match, after he was named on the extended interchange bench for game two. Canterbury-Bankstown Bulldogs captain Stephen Crichton returned to the team after missing game two with a shoulder injury. Bradman Best was selected for his first origin match since 2024, with Latrell Mitchell still unavailable due to a calf injury.

In the leadup, Ethan Strange was in some doubt after rolling his ankle at training, but remained in the final squad.

Wednesday, 8 July
20:05 AEST (UTC+10)

Queensland	12–30	New South Wales
Tries: 3 Tabuai-Fidow 35'; Cobbo 49'; Fifita 64'; Goals: 0 Walker (0/2); Walsh (0/1)	1st: 4–18; 2nd: 8–12; Report	Tries: 5 Cleary 15', 27'; Murray 30'; Best 57'; Young 80'; Goals: 5 Cleary (5/5) 16', 28', 31', 59', pen 71' (Note: New South Wales declined the conversion attempt on the try by Hudson Young.)

Suncorp Stadium, Brisbane
Attendance: 52,452
Referee: Ashley Klein
Video referee: Chris Butler
Touch judges: Matt Noyen, Phil Henderson
Player of the Match: Nathan Cleary (New South Wales)

Team details
Queensland		Position	New South Wales
Name	Number	Position	Number	Name
Kalyn Ponga	1	Fullback	1	James Tedesco
Selwyn Cobbo	2	Wing	2	Jack Bostock
Robert Toia	3	Centre	3	Bradman Best
Hamiso Tabuai-Fidow	4	Centre	4	Stephen Crichton
Jojo Fifita	5	Wing	5	Mark Nawaqanitawase
Cameron Munster (c)	6	Five eighth	6	Mitchell Moses
Sam Walker	7	Half back	7	Nathan Cleary
Thomas Flegler	8	Prop forward	8	Payne Haas
Harry Grant	9	Hooker	9	Reece Robson
Tino Fa'asuamaleaui	10	Prop forward	10	Mitchell Barnett
Briton Nikora	11	Second row	11	Hudson Young
Kurt Capewell	12	Second row	12	Liam Martin
Reuben Cotter	13	Lock forward	13	Isaah Yeo (c)
Max Plath	14	Interchange	14	Cameron Murray
Jeremiah Nanai	16	Interchange	15	Addin Fonua-Blake
Trent Loiero	17	Interchange	17	Blayke Brailey
Reece Walsh	18	Interchange	19	Toluta'u Koula
		Replacement	18	Ethan Strange
Billy Slater		Coach		Laurie Daley
NRL.com

External videos
- Game III full replay on the NRL's official YouTube channel

== Teams ==
=== New South Wales Blues ===
Position	Game 1	Game 2	Game 3
Fullback	James Tedesco		
Wing	Brian To'o		Jack Bostock
Centre	Stephen Crichton	Tolu Koula	Bradman Best
Centre	Kotoni Staggs		Stephen Crichton
Wing	Tolu Koula	Mark Nawaqanitawase	
Five-eighth	Ethan Strange	Mitchell Moses	
Halfback	Nathan Cleary		
Prop	Addin Fonua-Blake	Payne Haas	
Hooker	Reece Robson		
Prop	Mitchell Barnett		
Second row	Hudson Young		
Second row	Haumole Olakau'atu	Dylan Lucas	Liam Martin
Lock	Isaah Yeo (c)		
Interchange	Cameron Murray		
Interchange	Victor Radley		Tolu Koula
Interchange	Blayke Brailey	Addin Fonua-Blake	
Interchange	Casey McLean	Ethan Strange	Blayke Brailey
Replacement	Matt Burton	—N/a	Ethan Strange
Reserve(s)	Jacob Saifiti	Api Koroisau	Haumole Olakau'atu
Reserve(s)	—N/a	Jack Bostock	—N/a
Coach	Laurie Daley		

=== Queensland Maroons ===
Position	Game 1	Game 2	Game 3
Fullback	Kalyn Ponga		
Wing	Selwyn Cobbo		
Centre	Robert Toia		
Centre	Hamiso Tabuai-Fidow		
Wing	Jojo Fifita		
Five-eighth	Cameron Munster (c)		
Halfback	Sam Walker		
Prop	Thomas Flegler		
Hooker	Harry Grant		
Prop	Tino Fa'asuamaleaui		
Second row	Reuben Cotter	Briton Nikora	
Second row	Kurt Capewell		
Lock	Max Plath	Reuben Cotter	
Interchange	Briton Nikora	Max Plath	
Interchange	Lindsay Collins		Jeremiah Nanai
Interchange	Patrick Carrigan	Kulikefu Finefeuiaki	Reece Walsh
Interchange	Trent Loiero		
Reserve	Ezra Mam	Reece Walsh	Patrick Carrigan
Reserve	Gehamat Shibasaki	Murray Taulagi	
Coach	Billy Slater		

=== Debutants ===
Game I

- Cap no. 320, Toluta'u Koula
- Cap no. 321, Addin Fonua-Blake
- Cap no. 322, Victor Radley
- Cap no. 323, Blayke Brailey
- Cap no. 324, Ethan Strange
- Cap no. 325, Casey McLean
- Cap no. 237, Jojo Fifita
- Cap no. 238, Sam Walker
- Cap no. 239, Max Plath
- Cap no. 240, Briton Nikora

Game II

- Cap no. 326, Mark Nawaqanitawase
- Cap no. 327, Dylan Lucas
- Cap no. 241, Kulikefu Finefeuiaki

Game III

- Cap no. 328, Jack Bostock

== Men's Under-19 State of Origin ==
Thursday, 18 June
19:45 AEST (UTC+10)

New South Wales	14–28	Queensland
Tries: 2 Iakopo 28'; Batten 59'; Goals: 3 Mareko 30', pen 36', 61' (3/3)	1st: 8–12; 2nd: 6–16; Report	Tries: 5 Wynyard 9'; Francis 24', 65'; Clarke 42'; Watson 45'; Goals: 4 Lateo 11', 26', 47', 66' (4/5)

North Sydney Oval, Sydney
Referee: Tyson Brough
Video referee: Kasey Badger
Touch judges: Dylan Lawrence, Ethan Klein
Player of the Match: Hayden Watson (Queensland)

Team details
New South Wales		Position	Queensland
Name	Number	Position	Number	Name
Toby Winter	1	Fullback	1	Tyler Pereira
Jope Rauqe	2	Wing	2	Siosaia Poese
Dayne Jennings	3	Centre	3	Alize Clarke
Marcellus Iakopo	4	Centre	4	Kingston Seve
Archie Mesritz	5	Wing	5	Joseph Litidamu
Onitoni Large	6	Five eighth	6	Taj Lateo
Carter Mareko	7	Half back	7	Hayden Watson (c)
Ryda Talagi	8	Prop forward	8	Jackson Koina
Diesel Hagan (c)	9	Hooker	9	Amare Wynyard
Christian Taupau-Moors	10	Prop forward	10	Cody Starr
Christopher Petrus	11	Second row	11	Bishop Neal
Darcy Smith	12	Second row	12	Frank Howarth
Thomas Dellow	13	Lock forward	13	Tupou Francis
Toby Batten	14	Interchange	14	Ellyjah Birve
Roman Tuaimau	15	Interchange	15	Chaev Kolone
James Finegan	16	Interchange	16	Taylan To'a
Eddy Cayless	17	Interchange	17	Jett Ryan
Cameron Bamblett (not used)	18	Reserve	18	Adaquix-Jeramiah Watts-Luke (not used)
Josh Jackson		Coach		Darius Boyd
NRL.com

== See also ==
- 2026 Women's State of Origin
- 2026 NRL season
