= Dylan Lucas =

Australian rugby league footballer (born 2000)

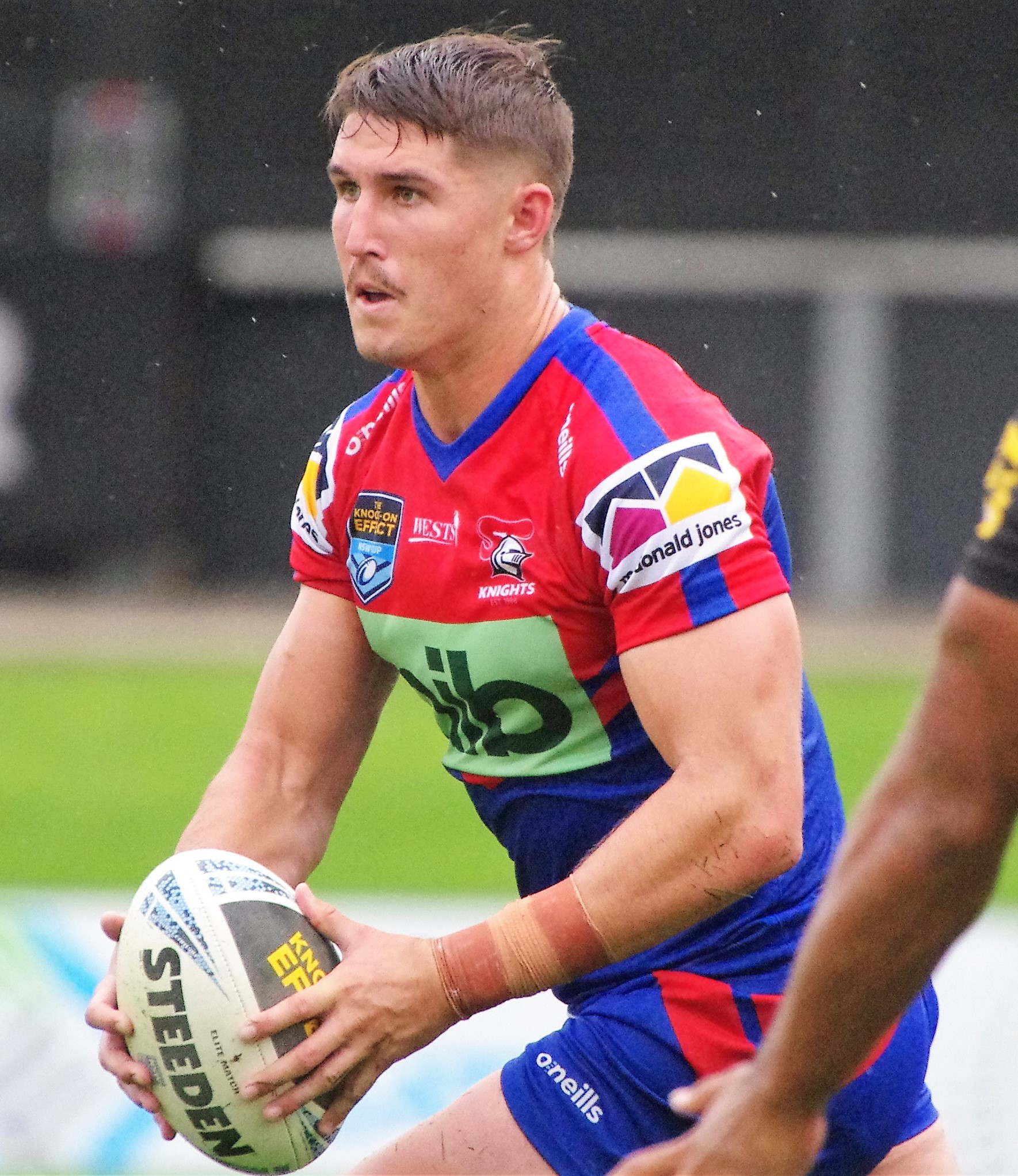

Personal information
- Born: 9 July 2000 (age 26) Bega, New South Wales, Australia
- Height: 184 cm (6 ft 0 in)
- Weight: 96 kg (15 st 2 lb)

Playing information
- Position: Second-row, Centre
Club
Years	Team	Pld	T	G	FG	P
2023–	Newcastle Knights	60	24	0	0	96
Representative
Years	Team	Pld	T	G	FG	P
2024	Prime Minister's XIII	1	1	0	0	4
2026	New South Wales	1	0	0	0	0
- Source: As of 6 November 2026

Dylan Lucas (born 9 July 2000) is an Australian professional rugby league footballer who plays as a second-row forward and centre for the Newcastle Knights in the National Rugby League.

== Background ==
Born in Bega, New South Wales, Lucas is of Indigenous Australian descent. He played his junior rugby league for the Albion Park Eagles, before being signed by the Illawarra Steelers.

== Playing career ==
=== Early years ===
Lucas played for the Illawarra Steelers' Harold Matthews Cup team in 2016 and S. G. Ball Cup side in 2018. In 2019, he joined the Newcastle Knights and played for their Jersey Flegg Cup team. In 2021, he graduated to their NSW Cup team. In 2022, he played in an NRL trial match for Newcastle against the Canterbury-Bankstown Bulldogs.

=== 2023 ===
In 2023, Lucas was upgraded to the Knights' top 30 NRL squad on a contract until the end of 2023. In round 3 of the 2023 NRL season, he made his first grade debut for Newcastle against the Dolphins.

=== 2024 ===
Lucas played 21 games for Newcastle in the 2024 NRL season as the club finished 8th and qualified for the finals. They were eliminated in the first week of the finals by North Queensland.

Lucas capped the year off by being selected in the Australian PMs XIII with boom teammate Fletcher Sharpe, Lucas would go on to impress as he also scored a stunning solo try in a 42-20 win against the PNG PMs XIII.

=== 2025 ===
In round 12 of the 2025 NRL season, Lucas scored a hat-trick in Newcastle's 25-6 victory over a depleted Penrith side. Lucas made 13 appearances for Newcastle in the 2025 NRL season as the club finished with the wooden spoon.

=== 2026 ===
On 4 June, Newcastle announced that Lucas had re-signed with the club until the end of 2030.

Lucas made his New South Wales State of Origin début on 17 June 2026 in the Game II 24-42 defeat at the MCG. Lucas was one of the New South Wales players who was not retained for game three.

On 24 July, Lucas suffered a dislocated ankle in a tackle during round 21 of the NRL season. Lucas was ruled out for the rest of the season. Lucas would later go on to make a quick recovery and returned to the Newcastle side for their finals campaign.

Lucas played 19 matches for Newcastle in the 2026 NRL season including their 2026 NRL Grand Final loss to the Sydney Roosters.

== Statistics ==
Year	Team	Games	Tries	Pts
2023	Newcastle Knights	7	2	8
2024	Newcastle Knights	21	7	28
2025	Newcastle Knights	13	5	20
2026	Newcastle Knights	10	6	24
	Totals	51	20	80
