= Reece Robson =

Australian rugby league footballer

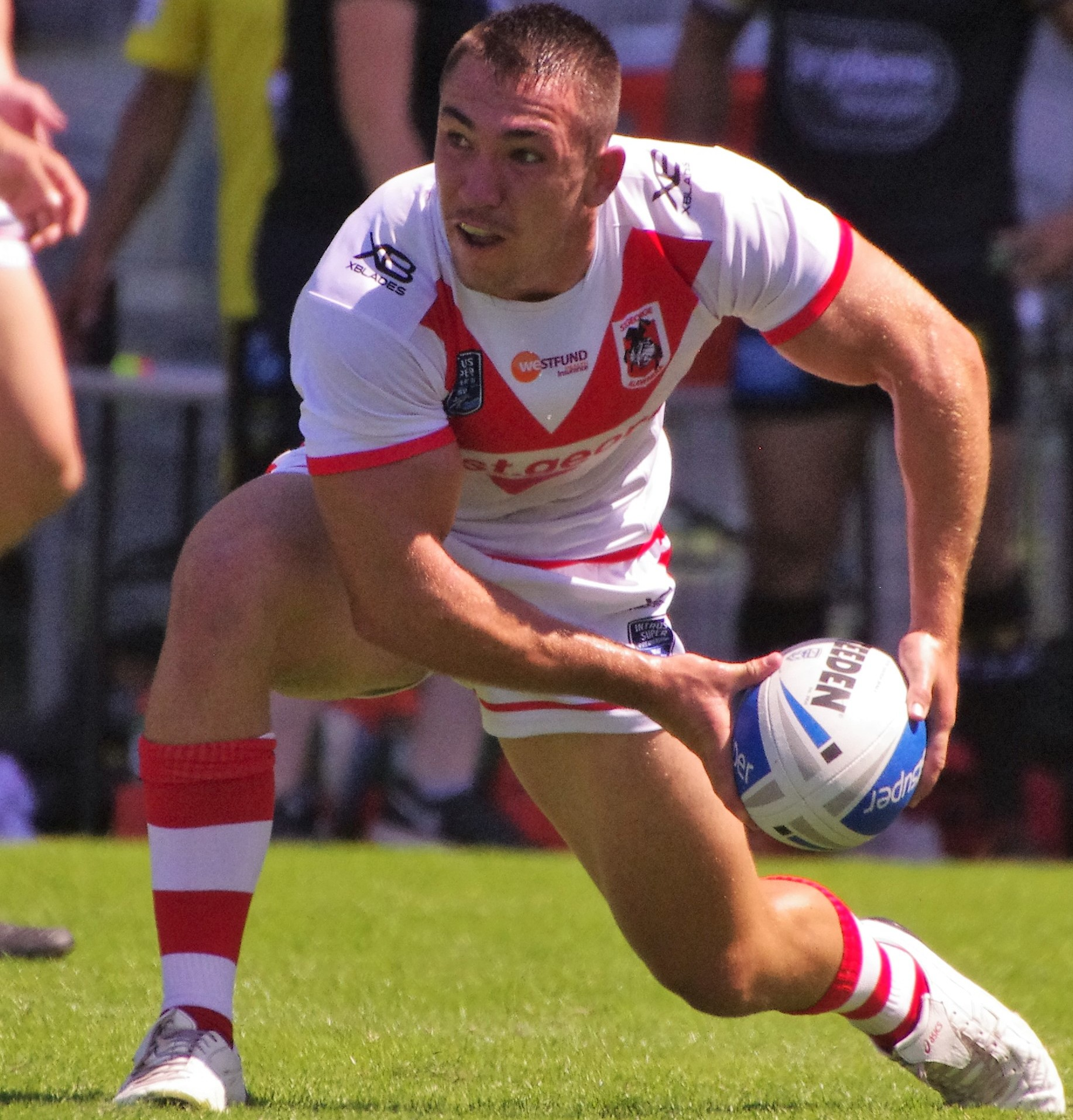

Personal information
- Full name: Reece Robson
- Born: 18 June 1998 (age 28) Murwillumbah, New South Wales, Australia
- Height: 180 cm (5 ft 11 in)
- Weight: 93 kg (14 st 9 lb)

Playing information
- Position: Hooker
Club
Years	Team	Pld	T	G	FG	P
2018–19	St. George Illawarra	9	0	0	0	0
2020–25	North Qld Cowboys	131	25	0	0	100
2026–	Sydney Roosters	23	3	0	0	12
	Total	163	28	0	0	112
Representative
Years	Team	Pld	T	G	FG	P
2018–23	Prime Minister's XIII	2	0	0	0	0
2023–26	New South Wales	11	0	0	0	0
- Source: As of 10 November 2026

Reece Robson (born 18 June 1998) is an Australian professional rugby league footballer who plays as a hooker for the Sydney Roosters in the National Rugby League (NRL).

He previously played for the St. George Illawarra Dragons in the NRL and at representative level has played for the Prime Minister's XIII and the New South Wales Blues.

== Background ==
Robson was born in Murwillumbah, in the Northern Rivers region of New South Wales, Australia.

He played junior rugby league for the Murwillumbah Colts and the Bilambil Jets, before moving to Sydney. In Sydney, he attended Endeavour Sports High School and played junior rugby league for De La Salle Caringbah. In 2016, while attending Endeavour Sports High, he represented the Australian Schoolboys.

Robson is the cousin of World Surf League Surfer Callum Robson.

== Playing career ==
=== Early career ===
In 2014, Robson was a member of the Cronulla-Sutherland Sharks Harold Matthews Cup squad. In 2015, he joined the St. George Dragons SG Ball Cup side. In 2016, despite still being SG Ball Cup-eligible, Robson moved up to the St. George Illawarra under-20 side, where he played 36 games over two seasons, scoring nine tries. Later that season, he started at hooker for the New South Wales under-18 side. In November 2016, he re-signed with St. George Illawarra until the end of the 2019 NRL season. In 2017, he was selected to start at hooker for the New South Wales under-20 and Junior Kangaroos sides.

=== 2018 ===
In 2018, Robson joined St. George's NRL squad and spent the majority of the season playing for their New South Wales Cup side, winning their Player of the Year award. He again represented the New South Wales under-20 and Junior Kangaroos sides in 2018.

In Round 9 of the 2018 NRL season, Robson made his debut off the bench in St. George's 34–14 win over Melbourne. On September 10 at the Brad Fittler medal awards, Robson won the award for NSW Under-20 Player of the Year. In October, he represented the Prime Minister's XIII in their win over the PNG Prime Minister's XIII.

=== 2019 ===
On 6 May, Robson was selected for the NSW Residents side that lost to the Queensland Residents. On 12 August, Robson signed a four-year deal with the North Queensland Cowboys, starting in 2020.

=== 2020 ===
In February, Robson was a member of the North Queensland 2020 NRL Nines winning squad, scoring a try in the final against his former club, the St. George Illawarra Dragons.

In Round 1 of the 2020 NRL season, he made his debut for North Queensland in their 21–28 loss to the Brisbane Broncos. In Round 3, he scored his first two tries against the Gold Coast Titans in a 36-6 win. In Round 5, Robson became the starting hooker for the North Queensland side. In Round 9, he scored two tries in a 16–42 loss to the Sydney Roosters. On 24 August, Robson was ruled out for the remainer of the 2020 NRL season after tearing his hamstring. In his first season with the North Queensland side, he played 14 games, scoring five tries.

=== 2021 ===
Robson played 24 games in 2021, scoring six tries. North Queensland would finish the 2021 NRL season in 15th position on the table narrowly avoiding the Wooden Spoon.

=== 2022 ===
Robson played 26 matches for North Queensland in the 2022 NRL season as the club finished third on the table and qualified for the finals. Robson played in both finals matches including their preliminary final loss to Parramatta. On 9 November, Robson signed a two-year contract extension to remain at North Queensland until the end of 2025.

=== 2023 ===
On 12 June, Robson was selected to play for New South Wales in game two of the 2023 State of Origin series. Robson was retained by New South Wales for game three as the blues lost the series 2-1. Robson made 23 appearances for North Queensland in the 2023 NRL season as the club finished 11th on the table.

=== 2024 ===
On 26 May, Robson was selected by New South Wales ahead of game one in the 2024 State of Origin series. Robson played in all three games as New South Wales won the series 2-1. Robson played 23 matches for North Queensland in the 2024 NRL season as they finished 5th on the table. Robson played in both finals games for North Queensland as they were eliminated in the second week by Cronulla. On 6 December, the Roosters announced that Robson had signed a four year deal to join them from the 2026 season.

=== 2025 ===
In May, Robson was selected by New South Wales ahead of game one in the 2025 State of Origin series. He played in all three games as New South Wales lost the series 2-1.

=== 2026 ===
In May, Robson was selected by New South Wales for game one in the 2026 State of Origin series. Robson played all three games for New South Wales as they won the series 2-1. Robson played 23 games for the Sydney Roosters in the 2026 NRL season including the clubs 2026 NRL Grand Final victory over Newcastle.

== Achievements and accolades ==
=== Individual ===
- St George Illawarra Dragons New South Wales Cup Player of the Year: 2018
- NSWRL Under-20 Player of the Year: 2018

=== Team ===
- 2020 NRL Nines: North Queensland Cowboys – Winners

NSW Blues

State of Origin

2024 Series: Winner

2026 Series: Winner

== Statistics ==
=== NRL ===
*denotes season competing

Season	Team	Matches	T	G	GK %	F/G	Pts
2018	St George Illawarra	2	0	0	—	0	0
2019	St George Illawarra	7	0	0	—	0	0
2020	North Queensland	14	5	0	—	0	20
2021	North Queensland	24	6	0	-	0	24
2022	North Queensland	26	7				28
2023	North Queensland	23	2				8
2024	North Queensland	23	3				12
2025	North Queensland	21	2				4
2026	Sydney Roosters	22	3				12
2027	Sydney Roosters						
Career totals		163	28	0	–	0	112
