= Max Plath =

Australian rugby league player

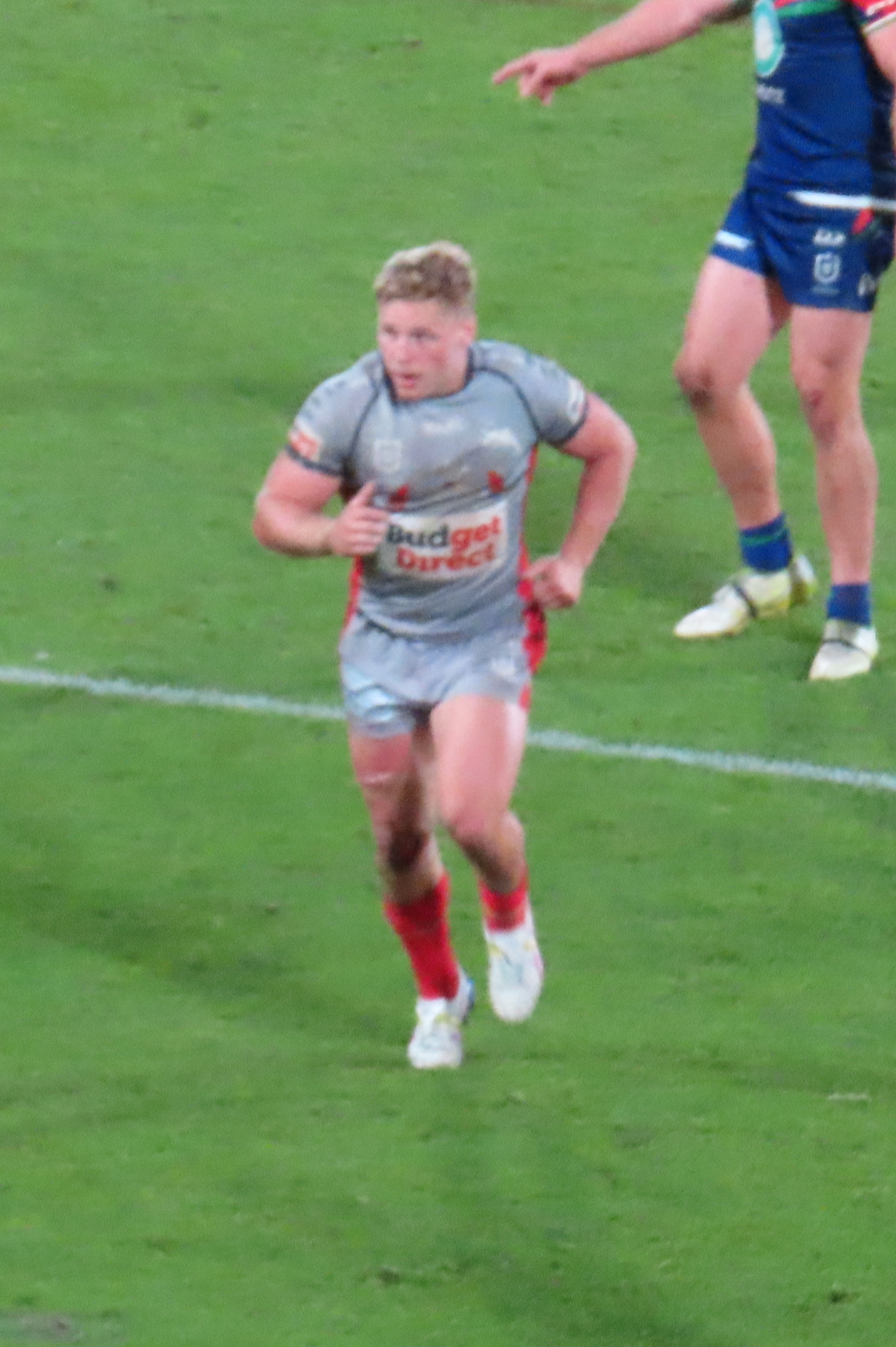
- Plath playing for the Dolphins in 2026.

Personal information
- Full name: Max Plath
- Born: 3 October 2001 (age 25) Brisbane, Queensland, Australia
- Height: 178 cm (5 ft 10 in)
- Weight: 87 kg (13 st 10 lb)

Playing information
- Position: Hooker, Lock, Second-row
Club
Years	Team	Pld	T	G	FG	P
2023–	Dolphins	52	12	0	0	48
Representative
Years	Team	Pld	T	G	FG	P
2026	Queensland	3	0	0	0	0
- Source: As of 6 November 2026
- Education: Iona College Brisbane
- Father: John Plath

Max Plath (born 3 October 2001) is an Australian professional rugby league footballer who plays as a hooker, lock or second-row forward for the Dolphins in the National Rugby League (NRL).

== Background ==
Plath was born in Brisbane, Queensland and was educated at Iona College, where he played rugby union in the AIC competition. He is the son of former Brisbane Broncos utility John Plath, and older brother of Jordan Plath, who has left the South Sydney Rabbitohs and has joined Dolphins on a 2 year deal and is playing in the Hostplus Cup. He played his junior rugby league at Capalaba Warriors for a small stint before playing at Wynnum Manly Juniors.

== Playing career ==
=== Early career ===
During 2022 and 2023, Plath played seventeen games, scored nine tries and kicked nineteen goals for the Wynnum Manly Seagulls in the Hostplus Cup. He has also played in the Queensland under-19 team.

=== Dolphins (2023–present) ===
During 2023, Plath played fifteen games and scored six tries for the Redcliffe Dolphins in the Hostplus Cup competition run by the Queensland Rugby League (QRL). On 2 June 2023 in round 14 of the 2023 NRL season, Plath made his first grade debut from the bench in their 8–30 loss to the New Zealand Warriors at Mount Smart Stadium. In total, Plath played two NRL games and scored one try for the Dolphins that year. In December 2023, his contract was extended until 2026.

=== 2024 ===
In round 4 of the 2024 NRL season, Plath was placed on report for a hip drop tackle during the clubs 30–14 victory over the Gold Coast Titans. Plath was later suspended for two games. In round 7 of the 2024 NRL season, Plath scored two tries for the Dolphins in their 44–16 victory over Parramatta. He played a total of 21 games for the Dolphins in the 2024 NRL season as the club finished 10th on the table.

=== 2025 ===
On 26 February, the Dolphins announced that Plath extended his contract until the end of 2028. Plath was limited to just eight games for the Dolphins in the 2025 NRL season as the club narrowly missed out on the finals finishing 9th.

=== 2026 ===
He made his Queensland debut in Game 1 of the 2026 State of Origin on 27 May 2026 in the 22-20 defeat. Plath played 21 matches for the club in the 2026 NRL season including their preliminary final loss to eventual premiers the Sydney Roosters.

== Statistics ==
Year	Team	Games	Tries	Pts
2023	Dolphins	2	1	4
2024	Dolphins	21	4	16
2025	Dolphins	8	3	12
2026	Dolphins	10	1	4
	Totals	41	9	36
