= Hudson Young =

Australia international rugby league footballer (born 1998)

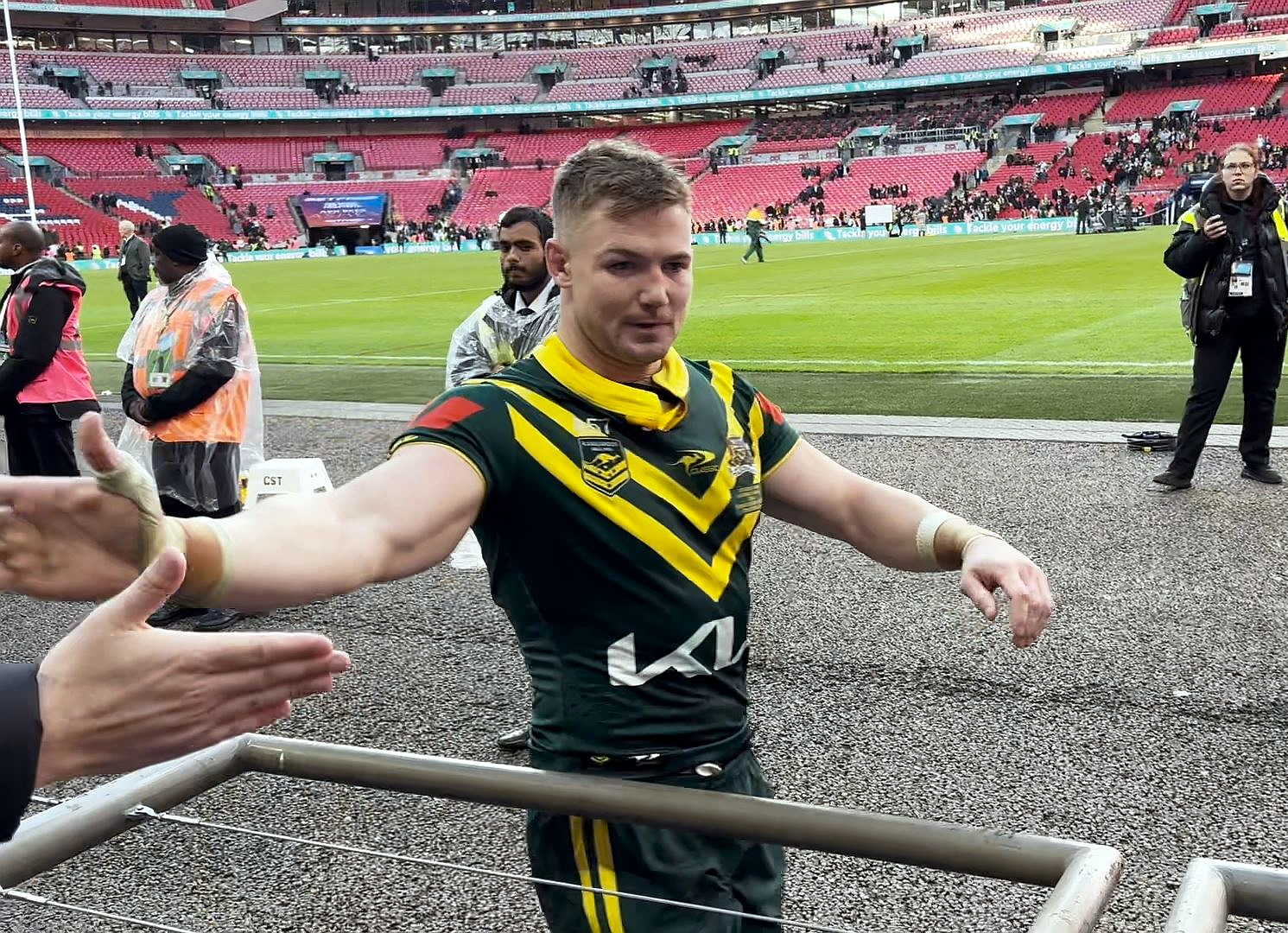

Personal information
- Full name: Hudson Young
- Born: 11 June 1998 (age 28) Maitland, New South Wales, Australia
- Height: 183 cm (6 ft 0 in)
- Weight: 98 kg (15 st 6 lb)

Playing information
- Position: Second-row
Club
Years	Team	Pld	T	G	FG	P
2019–	Canberra Raiders	155	59	0	0	236
Representative
Years	Team	Pld	T	G	FG	P
2023–26	New South Wales	9	2	0	0	8
2023	Prime Minister's XIII	1	1	0	0	4
2024–25	Australia	6	2	0	0	8
- Source: As of 6 November 2026

Hudson Young (born 11 June 1998) is an Australian professional rugby league footballer who plays as a second-row forward for the Canberra Raiders in the National Rugby League.

== Background ==
Young was born in Maitland, in the Hunter Region of New South Wales, Australia. He is of Ukrainian descent.

He played his junior rugby league for the Greta Branxton Colts.

== Career ==
=== 2019 ===
Young made his debut in Round 3 of the 2019 NRL season against the Newcastle Knights.

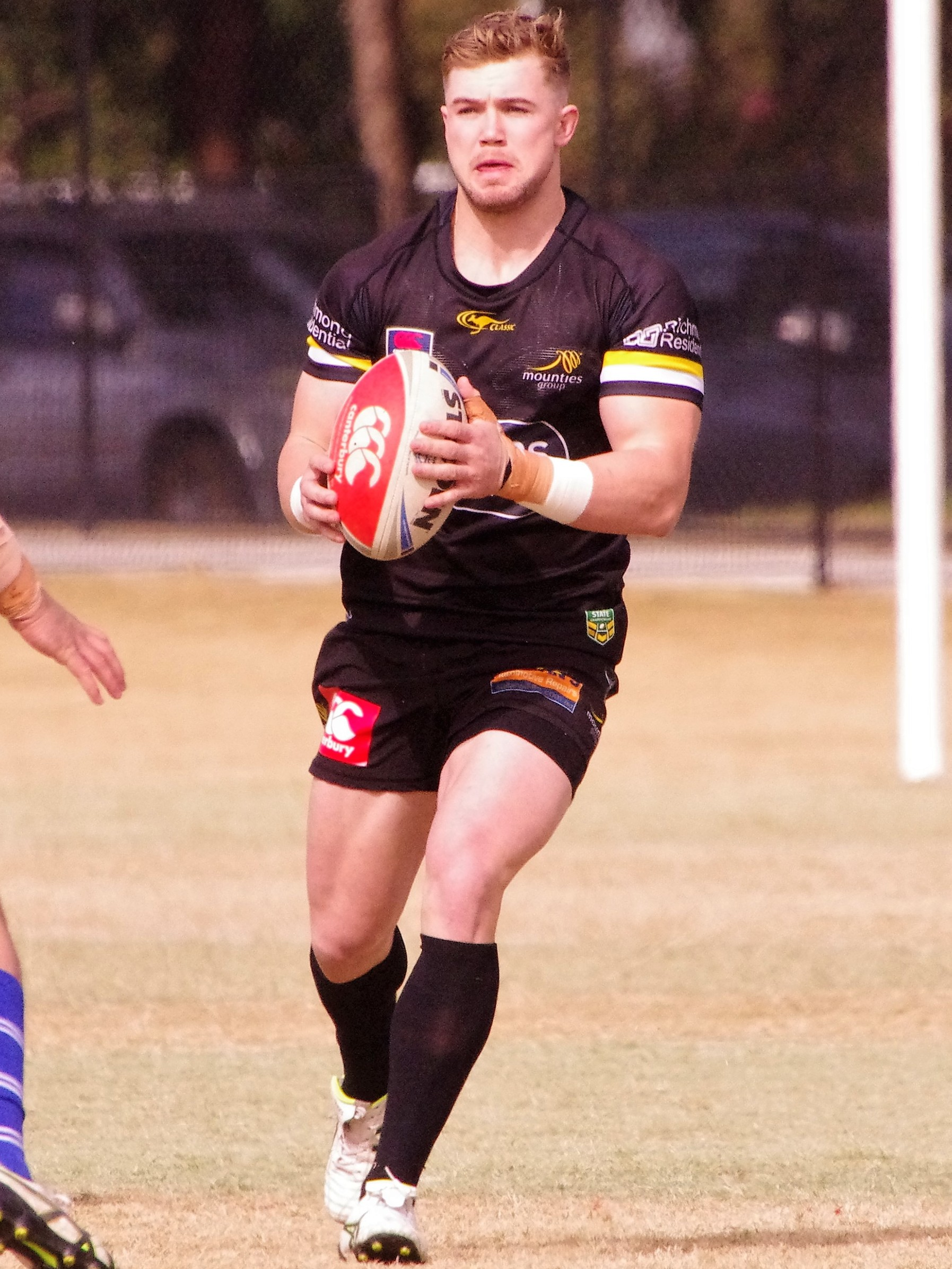
Young playing for the Mounties in 2019

In round 25 against the New Zealand Warriors, Young was referred to the match review committee after it was alleged by Fox Sports that he tried to gouge the eyes of New Zealand player Adam Pompey. Young was subsequently found guilty and suspended for 8 matches. This was the second time during the 2019 NRL season in which Young was suspended for eye gouging. The first incident occurred earlier in the year when Young was found guilty of attempting to eye gouge Canterbury-Bankstown player Aiden Tolman. Young was suspended for 5 matches over that incident.

=== 2020 ===
Young played 18 games for Canberra in the 2020 NRL season including all three of the club's finals games as they made it to the preliminary final before losing to eventual premiers Melbourne Storm.

=== 2021 ===
In the 2021 NRL season, Young played 19 games for Canberra as the club missed the finals finishing 10th.

=== 2022 ===
In round 15 of the 2022 NRL season, Young scored a sensational match-winning try for Canberra in their 20-18 victory over Newcastle, after regathering his own kick. In round 24 of the 2022 NRL season, Young scored two tries for Canberra in a 48-6 victory over Manly-Warringah. The following week, Young scored a further two tries in Canberra's 56-10 victory over wooden spooners the Wests Tigers.

=== 2023 ===
On 22 May, Young was selected by New South Wales for game one of the 2023 State of Origin series after showing good club form with Canberra during the first half of the season. He was also selected for Game 2 but was dropped for the 'dead rubber' match in Sydney after NSW lost the series. In September, it was announced that Young had signed a three-year contract extension to remain at Canberra until the end of 2027. Young played a total of 24 matches for Canberra in the 2023 NRL season as the club finished 8th on the table and qualified for the finals. Young played in the clubs elimination finals loss against Newcastle.

=== 2024 ===
In round 11 of the 2024 NRL season, Young scored two tries for Canberra in their 24-20 victory over Canterbury. On 26 May, Young was selected by New South Wales ahead of the 2024 State of Origin series. Young was not retained for game two of the series after New South Wales lost game one 38-10. Young played a total of 22 games for Canberra in the 2024 NRL season as the club finished 9th on the table.

=== 2025 ===
On 24 February it was revealed that Young had been briefly removed from the Canberra sides Las Vegas hotel after he became involved in a scuffle with teammate Morgan Smithies. Head coach Ricky Stuart later spoke to the media saying “I have spoken to the players who are very embarrassed,” Stuart said. “The behaviour was unacceptable. The club will deal with this strongly". In round 5 of the 2025 NRL season, Young scored two tries and was also sin binned in Canberra's 24-20 victory over Cronulla.

In May, Young was selected by New South Wales for the 2025 State of Origin series. He played in all three games as New South Wales lost the series 2-1.

Young played 22 matches for Canberra in the 2025 NRL season as the club claimed the Minor Premiership. Young played in both finals matches as Canberra went out in straight sets losing to both Brisbane and Cronulla.

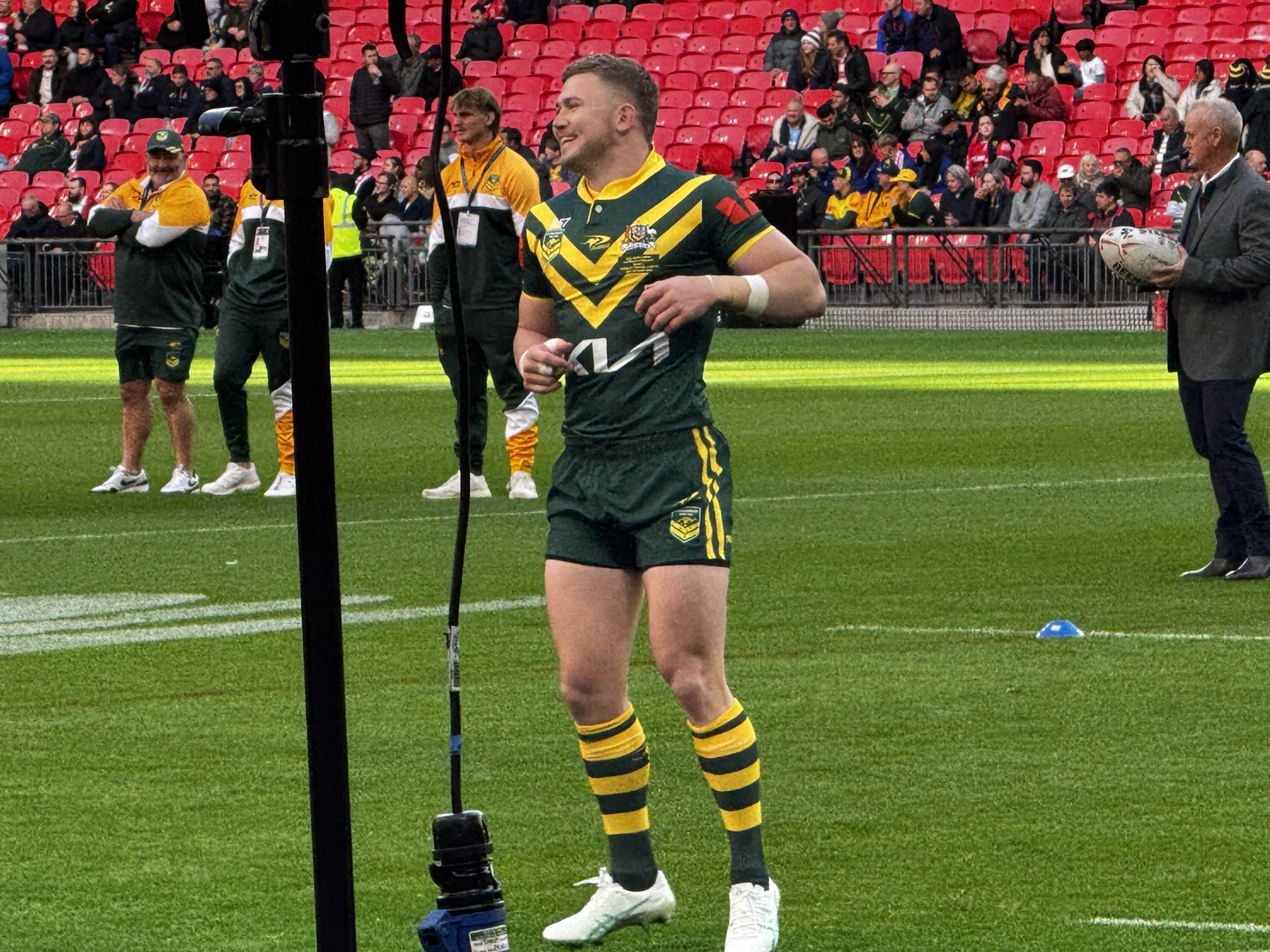
Young warming up for Australia in 2025

=== 2026 ===
In May, Young was selected by New South Wales for game one in the 2026 State of Origin series. Young played all three games for New South Wales as they won the series 2-1. In round 20, Young was taken off the field with a suspected Achilles injury. It was confirmed that Young would be ruled out of the rest of the season and the World Cup.

== Statistics ==
Season	Team	Games	Tries	Pts
2019	Canberra Raiders	12	1	4
2020	Canberra Raiders	18	4	16
2021	Canberra Raiders	19	5	20
2022	Canberra Raiders	24	14	56
2023	Canberra Raiders	24	9	36
2024	Canberra Raiders	23	10	40
2025	Canberra Raiders	22	11	44
2026	Canberra Raiders	14	5	20
	Totals	155	59	236

source;
