= John Plath =

Australian rugby league footballer

Personal information
- Born: 17 March 1969 (age 57) Gayndah, Queensland, Australia

Playing information
- Position: Utility
Club
Years	Team	Pld	T	G	FG	P
1990–99	Brisbane Broncos	149	20	0	0	80
- Source: As of 7 March 2012
- Education: Brisbane State High School
- Relatives: Max Plath (son)

John Plath (born 17 March 1969; Gayndah, Queensland) is an Australian former rugby league footballer who played in the 1990s. He played in all of the Brisbane Broncos' first four grand final wins from the interchange bench and retired as the most-capped Bronco not to have played representative football.

Plath was a Queensland schoolboy rugby union representative in 1986/87. He played rugby league for Wynnum-Manly Seagulls before he was graded by the Brisbane Broncos from their Colts team in 1990. Plath also had a season with the London Crusaders in 1991-92.

His utility value saw him on the bench in the Broncos' inaugural grand final win in 1992. In the weeks following the grand final, Plath travelled with the Broncos to England, where he played from the interchange bench in the 1992 World Club Challenge against British champions Wigan, helping Brisbane become the first NSWRL club to win the match in Britain. The following year, he again played in the Broncos' grand final, helping them to a second consecutive premiership. He was a replacement player in Brisbane's 14-20 loss to Wigan in the 1994 World Club Challenge at Lang Park. Plath was also used from the bench in Brisbane's win over the Cronulla-Sutherland Sharks in the Broncos' Super League grand final for the 1997 Telstra Cup before keeping his big-game interchange reputation intact in a cameo role in the Broncos' 1998 NRL grand final win against the Canterbury Bulldogs.

After retiring from playing, Plath spent two years at Wynnum-Manly as a development officer and CEO.

In 2016, John Plath or "Plathy" as he is affectionately known returned to rugby union assisting in coaching the Wynnum Bugs. He also took on a special mentoring project at the club with the team's struggling players, giving them a name "The Red Rockets" to try to lift them out of their squalor.

== Personal life ==
Plath's son Max also played for Wynnum-Manly Seagulls and was signed by the Dolphins (NRL) in 2023. Plath’s youngest son Jordan Plath signed with the South Sydney Rabbitohs NSW Cup team.
