= 2026 NRL Grand Final =

Australian rugby league game

- Accor Stadium hosted the match

Sydney Roosters	Newcastle Knights
19	18
	1	2	Total
SYD	6	13	19
NEW	12	6	18
- Date: 4 October 2026
- Stadium: Accor Stadium
- Location: Sydney, New South Wales, Australia
- Clive Churchill Medal: James Tedesco
- National Anthem: Emily Nkomo
- Referee: Adam Gee
- Attendance: 80,814

Broadcast partners
- Broadcasters: Nine Network
- Commentators: Mathew Thompson; Andrew Johns; Billy Slater

The 2026 NRL Grand Final was a rugby league grand final match contested between the Sydney Roosters and the Newcastle Knights at Accor Stadium in Sydney, on Sunday, 4 October 2026. The match determined the 2026 NRL premiers. The Roosters defeated Newcastle 19–18 after trailing by six points at half-time to claim the Provan-Summons Trophy for the first time since 2019. It was their 16th premiership title overall which advanced them to outright second on the all-time NRL premiership tally. Roosters fullback and captain James Tedesco was awarded the Clive Churchill Medal for being judged as player of the match.

The match was preceded by the 2026 NRL State Championship and the NRL Women's Premiership Grand Final.

== Background ==
=== 2026 season ===
Sydney Roosters' finals results
Round	Opposition	Venue	Score
QF	Penrith Panthers	CommBank Stadium (A)	19–12
SF	Cronulla Sharks	Allianz Stadium (H)	46–10
PF	Dolphins	Suncorp Stadium (A)	20–36
Key: (H) = Home venue; (A) = Away venue; (N) = Neutral venue

Newcastle Knights' finals results
Round	Opposition	Venue	Score
QF	South Sydney Rabbitohs	Allianz Stadium (A)	10–20
SF	New Zealand Warriors	Eden Park (A)	10–12
PF	Penrith Panthers	Accor Stadium (A)	14–22
Key: (H) = Home venue; (A) = Away venue; (N) = Neutral venue

The 2026 NRL season was the 119th season of professional rugby league in Australia and the 29th season run by the National Rugby League. The season consisted of 27 competition rounds, followed by a finals series contested by the top eight teams on the competition ladder.

It was the first grand final meeting between the Sydney Roosters and the Newcastle Knights, and was the first premiership decider since the 2020 NRL Grand Final in which neither team had featured in the preceding year's match. The Roosters finished 4th on the premiership ladder with 16 wins from 24 matches, whilst the Knights achieved 14 wins and finished 7th. For the first time since 2005, both grand finalists had played every round of the finals series. The Roosters last played in a grand final in 2019 when they defeated the Canberra Raiders. The Knights ended the longest active grand final drought in the NRL, having not reached a grand final in 25 years since they defeated the Parramatta Eels in 2001. They became the first side since the North Queensland Cowboys in 2017 to reach the grand final from outside the top four. The Roosters and Knights last faced each other in the finals during the 2013 season, with the Roosters winning 40–14 in the preliminary finals before going on to become the season's premiers.

=== Newcastle Knights farewell parade incident ===
During a farewell parade for the Knights on 3 October, a car lost control on the Newcastle Link Road and crashed into a crowd of supporters waiting for the team bus to pass. Ten people, including children, were injured, two of whom critically, and 18-year-old provisionally-licenced driver Indika Bambrick Samarasinghe was arrested by NSW Police; he was later charged with multiple counts of dangerous and negligent driving occasioning grievous bodily harm.

== Pre-match ==
=== Broadcasting ===
==== Television ====
The match was broadcast live on the Nine Network in Australia and 9Now, and on Sky Sport in New Zealand. Mathew Thompson, Andrew Johns, and Billy Slater were the commentators for the match, joined by Danika Mason and Brad Fittler on the sidelines. The coverage was hosted by James Bracey. Thompson has led Nine's grand final commentary since taking over from Ray Warren in 2022.

Fox League produced their own commentary for the replay of the match on subscription television, with veteran commentator Andrew Voss calling his first grand final as play-by-play commentator after working in the game for more than 40 years. The Fox League coverage had in the past usually been led by Warren Smith, who missed the entire 2026 NRL season due to multiple voice box surgeries.

==== Radio ====
Radio broadcasters included ABC, Triple M, 2GB, 4BC, and NRL Nation.

=== Officiating ===
Adam Gee was appointed as the referee for the match. He previously was the main referee for the 2023 NRL Grand Final. Tyson Brough and Phil Henderson were appointed as touch judges, while Chris Butler was chosen as the bunker review official. Gee was favoured for the role following the demotion of Ashley Klein after his controversial performance during Newcastle's win over the New Zealand Warriors in their semi-final.

Match officials
Position	Name	Standby
Referee	Adam Gee	Gerard Sutton
Touch Judges	Phil Henderson, Tyson Brough	Matt Noyen
Bunker Review Official	Chris Butler	—N/a

=== Entertainment ===
Pre-game entertainment was initially set to be performed by Australian singer Tones and I; however, negotiations reportedly fell through after she declined to sing her breakout single, "Dance Monkey". The singer later cited "scheduling conflicts" as the reason. On 28 September 2026, Peter V'landys announced a new act had been acquired, although it would not be revealed until the day of the match.

On 30 September, it was confirmed that Jai Arrow would complete a lap of honour before the Grand Final, accompanied by a performance of "You'll Never Walk Alone". Arrow was paraded around the field with former Wallabies player Nathan Charles who had also recently shared his diagnosis with motor neuron disease.

The performers, announced on 2 October 2026, included singers Amy Shark, Dave Gleeson from The Screaming Jets, Phil Jamieson from Grinspoon, as well as musicians from Peking Duk, and Teen Jesus and the Jean Teasers. The group performed the 1990s rugby league anthem "The Best" to close the prematch segment.

Following the scoring of the first try, the stadium DJ played "Dance Monkey" much to the amusement of many spectators.

The Australian National Anthem was performed by Zimbabwean-Australian singer Emily Nkomo, who was playing Nala in the Australian production of The Lion King at Sydney's Capitol Theatre.

== Teams ==
The Sydney Roosters squad as named on the Tuesday before the match was unchanged from their preliminary final win against the Dolphins. Utility player Connor Watson had suffered a concussion in that match and was initially named in the squad pending clearance from an independent neurologist, but was later ruled out after he was not cleared to play. The Roosters included five players (Tedesco, Tupou, Radley, Crichton and Butcher) who played in the team's last NRL Grand Final in 2019. Five-eighth Daly Cherry-Evans had previously featured in grand final matches with the Manly Warringah Sea Eagles (2011 and 2013), winning the Clive Churchill Medal in the 2013 NRL Grand Final against the Roosters. At 37 years and 183 days, Cherry-Evans broke the record of Cameron Smith (37 years, 130 days in 2020) as the oldest player to line up in NRL grand final history.

Following the suspension of Newcastle Knights hooker Phoenix Crossland, who received a four-match ban from the NRL Judiciary following a dangerous tackle that broke the leg of Penrith's Nathan Cleary in the Knights' preliminary final victory, Newcastle made one change to their lineup, with Harrison Graham named to start the match. The Knights had only one player with previous grand final experience — Dane Gagai featuring at centre for the South Sydney Rabbitohs in the 2021 NRL Grand Final. Other Newcastle players to miss the match were the injured Dylan Brown, who suffered a serious knee injury in July, and the suspended Jacob Saifiti, who was sent off in the Knights' final match of the regular season and suspended for four matches.

Sydney	Newcastle

Team details
Sydney Roosters		Position	Newcastle Knights
Name	Number	Position	Number	Name
James Tedesco (c)	1	Fullback	1	Kalyn Ponga (c)
Daniel Tupou	2	Wing	2	Dominic Young
Billy Smith	3	Centre	3	Dane Gagai
Robert Toia	4	Centre	4	Bradman Best
Mark Nawaqanitawase	5	Wing	5	Greg Marzhew
Daly Cherry-Evans	6	Five eighth	6	Fletcher Sharpe
Sam Walker	7	Half back	7	Sandon Smith
Naufahu Whyte	8	Prop forward	8	Tyson Frizell
Reece Robson	9	Hooker	19	Thomas Cant
Lindsay Collins	10	Prop forward	10	Cody Hopwood
Salesi Foketi	11	Second row	11	Jermaine McEwen
Siua Wong	12	Second row	12	Francis Manuleleua
Victor Radley	13	Lock forward	13	Mat Croker
Angus Crichton	15	Interchange	14	Harrison Graham
Nat Butcher	16	Interchange	15	Lachlan Crouch
Spencer Leniu	17	Interchange	16	Pasami Saulo
Hugo Savala (not used)	18	Interchange	17	Dylan Lucas
Cody Ramsey (not used)	19	Reserve	18	Fletcher Hunt (not used)
Benaiah Ioelu (not used)	20	Reserve	21	Diesel Hagan (not used)
Trent Robinson		Coach		Justin Holbrook
NRL.com

== Match summary ==
Despite the close scoreline, and a 12–0 deficit early on, the game was largely dominated by the Sydney Roosters. After Newcastle scored two converted tries in the first half-hour, the Roosters pulled one back through Mark Nawaqanitawase before half-time and went on to score another two tries, a penalty and a Daly Cherry-Evans field goal unanswered as the Knights players tired. A late try from Newcastle's Greg Marzhew against the run of play set up a grandstand finish with three minutes remaining, but the Knights were unable to capitalise on the momentum shift and Sydney saw the game out by carrying the ball defensively in the final set.

=== Clive Churchill Medal ===
Sydney Roosters fullback James Tedesco was presented the Clive Churchill Medal by Peter Sterling, who won the medal in the 1986 Grand Final. Tedesco was instrumental in the Roosters victory, running for 385 metres to set the record for most run metres in any NRL finals match. He also made zero tackles.

=== Scoreboard ===
2026 NRL Grand Final

Sunday, 4 October
19:30 AEDT (UTC+11)

Sydney Roosters	19 – 18	Newcastle Knights
Tries: 3 Nawaqanitawase 36', 60'; B. Smith 48'; Goals: 3 Walker 38', 49', pen 55' (3/4); Field goals: 1 Cherry-Evans 70' (1/1)	1st: 6–12; 2nd: 13–6; Report	Tries: 3 Manuleleua 16'; Ponga 30'; Marzhew 76'; Goals: 3 S. Smith 17', 32', 76' (3/3)

Accor Stadium, Sydney
Attendance: 80,814
Referee: Adam Gee
Video referee: Chris Butler
Touch judges: Tyson Brough, Phil Henderson
Clive Churchill Medal: James Tedesco

== Post-match ==
Newcastle captain Kalyn Ponga was charged by the NRL match review committee with a grade one careless high tackle charge for a 25th minute tackle on Sydney Roosters forward Victor Radley. Ponga was fined $1,000 by the NRL Judiciary for the incident after taking an early guilty plea.

The Roosters win was the fourth NRL premiership title won by forward Spencer Leniu after his previous three premierships with the Penrith Panthers (2021–2023). Leniu was subsequently released from his contract at the Roosters following the match, ending his time at the club after three seasons.

In his final NRL match before a switch to Super League to play with Hull F.C., Roosters halfback Daly Cherry-Evans won his second premiership, 15 years after his first when playing for the Manly Warringah Sea Eagles in 2011.

Following the Grand Final, Roosters winger Daniel Tupou announced his retirement from rugby league. The 35-year-old left the sport with four premierships (2013, 2018, 2019, 2026) after playing 307 NRL matches in a career spanning from 2012 through 2026. The Grand Final was also the final match for both Angus Crichton and Mark Nawaqanitawase who both finished their time in the code before moving to play rugby union.

== Opening matches ==
Two opening matches were played on the ground prior to the grand final: the NRL State Championship and NRL Women's Grand Final. Both matches were broadcast live throughout Australia by the Nine Network and Fox League.

=== NRL State Championship ===
Queensland Cup premiers Redcliffe Dolphins set records for the highest score and winning margin in their 68–14 win against the NSW Cup premiers Penrith Panthers. Dolphins five-eighth Jake Averillo was announced as the player of the match, scoring three tries in the match ahead of his move to the Wests Tigers in 2027.

2026 NRL State Championship

Sunday, 4 October
13:20 AEDT (UTC+11)

Penrith Panthers	14 – 68	Redcliffe Dolphins
Tries: 3 Edgar 15'; Clarke 54'; Liddiard 64'; Goals: 1 Clarke 55' (1/3)	1st: 4–40; 2nd: 10–28; Match Centre	Tries: 12; Averillo 4', 37', 44'; Gyemore 12', 74'; Coghill 20', 58'; Naufahu 25'; Pouniu 30'; Eilliot 34'; Fuller 47'; Saldanha 67'; Goals: 10; James 6', 13', 27', 31', 35', 38', 46', 48', 60', 70' (10/12)

Accor Stadium, Sydney
Referee: Kieren Irons
Video referee: Ashley Klein
Touch judges: Jack Klein, Nathan Cornick
Player of the Match: Jake Averillo (Redcliffe)

Team details
Penrith Panthers		Position	Redcliffe Dolphins
Name	Number	Position	Number	Name
Jaxen Edgar	1	Fullback	1	Trai Fuller
Nick Murphy	2	Wing	2	Steven Numambo
Patrick Moimoi	3	Centre	3	Jude Saldanha
Jesse McLean	4	Centre	4	Kyle Coghill
Jirah Liddiard	5	Wing	5	Tevita Naufahu
Keahn Skipps	6	Five eighth	6	Jake Averillo
Kurt Falls	7	Half back	7	Joshua James
Tom Ale	8	Prop forward	8	Sebastian Su'a
Billy Scott	9	Hooker	9	Brent Woolf
Jakeb Vailalo	15	Prop forward	10	Felise Kaufusi
Zakauri Clarke	11	Second row	11	Brian Pouniu
Kalani Leuluai-Going (c)	12	Second row	12	Sam Elliott
Luron Patea	13	Lock forward	13	Bradley Schneider
Josh Ruxton	10	Interchange	14	Jordan Plath
Vea Tapa'atoutai	14	Interchange	15	Sheldon Pitama (c)
Buster Hindmarsh	17	Interchange	16	Domenico De Stadis
Tuaomaliemavaitoelau Patea	22	Interchange	17	Jaron Purcell
Delahia Wigmore (not used)	16	Reserve	18	Jack Johnson (not used)
Matt Eisenhuth		Coach		Dave Elliott
NRL.com

=== NRL Women's Premiership Grand Final ===
2026 NRL Women's Premiership Grand Final

Sunday, 4 October
16:00 AEDT (UTC+11)

Sydney Roosters	30 – 6	Brisbane Broncos
Tries: 7 Parker 5', 27', 57'; Aiken 17'; Kelly 21'; Fressard 23'; Hall 32'; Goals: 1 Kelleher 17' (1/7)	1st: 26–0; 2nd: 4–6; Match Centre	Tries: 1 Southwell 64'; Goals: 1 Southwell 66' (1/1)

Accor Stadium, Sydney
Attendance: 47,451
Referee: Belinda Sharpe
Video referee: Wyatt Raymond
Touch judges: Karra-Lee Nolan, Rochelle Tamarua
Karyn Murphy Medal: Tarryn Aiken (Sydney)

Team details
Sydney Roosters		Position	Brisbane Broncos
Name	Number	Position	Number	Name
Corban Baxter	1	Fullback	1	Tamika Upton (c)
Brydie Parker	2	Wing	2	Kerri Johnson
Jessica Sergis	3	Centre	3	Deleni Paitai
Isabelle Kelly (c)	4	Centre	4	Georgia Bartlett
Jayme Fressard	5	Wing	5	Julia Robinson
Jocelyn Kelleher	6	Five eighth	6	Ali Brigginshaw
Tarryn Aiken	7	Half back	7	Jesse Southwell
Millie Elliott	8	Prop forward	8	Shannon Mato
Keeley Nizza	9	Hooker	9	Jada Ferguson
Otesa Pule	10	Prop forward	10	Brianna Clark
Sariah Paki	11	Second row	11	Lauren Dam
Jasmin Strange	12	Second row	12	Romy Teitzel
Olivia Kernick	13	Lock forward	13	Lillian Yarrow
Taina Naividi	14	Interchange	14	Rhemy Hinckesman
Aliyah Nasio	15	Interchange	15	Chelsea Lenarduzzi
Rima Butler	16	Interchange	16	Reegan Hicks
Amber Hall	17	Interchange	17	Harlem Walker
Mia Wood	18	Reserve	18	Caitlin Urwin
John Strange		Coach		Scott Prince
NRL.com
