= Dayne Jennings =

Australian rugby league footballer (born 2007)

Personal information
- Born: 29 October 2007 (age 18) Gosford, New South Wales, Australia
- Height: 181 cm (5 ft 11 in)
- Weight: 85 kg (13 st 5 lb)

Playing information
- Position: Centre, Wing
Club
Years	Team	Pld	T	G	FG	P
2026–	South Sydney	3	1	0	0	4
- Source: RLP

Dayne Jennings (born 29 October 2007) is an Australian rugby league footballer for the South Sydney Rabbitohs in the National Rugby League (NRL).

== Early life ==
Jennings was born in Gosford, New South Wales, and attended Central Coast Sports College.

== Career ==
An outside back, Jennings was a Terrigal Wamberal Sharks junior and joined the Rabbitohs in 2024, starting out in their Harold Matthews Cup team. He represented the 2025 Australian Schoolboys side against the PNG Junior Kumuls, scoring a long-range solo try in a winning cause.

In 2026, Jennings gained further representative honours with the NSW under-19s in the State of Origin, and despite starting the year in the SG Ball Cup was able to break into first-grade, making three appearances. He debuted off the bench in round 17 against the Parramatta Eels and earned a starting position as a winger in the next two rounds. His run of games was ended after he was sidelined with a leg laceration. He is contracted through to the end of the 2028 season.
