= Ryda Talagi =

Australian rugby league footballer (born 2007)

Personal information
- Born: 12 February 2007 (age 19) Liverpool, New South Wales, Australia
- Height: 189 cm (6 ft 2 in)
- Weight: 112 kg (17 st 9 lb)

Playing information
- Position: Prop
Club
Years	Team	Pld	T	G	FG	P
2026–	Parramatta Eels	1	0	0	0	0
- Source: RLP

Ryda Talagi (born 12 February 2007) is an Australian rugby league footballer for the Parramatta Eels in the National Rugby League (NRL).

== Early life ==
Born in Sydney, Talagi is a younger brother of Penrith Panthers centre Blaize Talagi and was coached by his father Byron while playing junior rugby league for Cabramatta. He attended Westfields Sports High School and was a 2024 Australian Schoolboys representative player.

== Career ==
Talagi is a prop and started his career with the Parramatta Eels in the Harold Matthews Cup, gaining their "Forward of the Year" award for 2024. He then progressed quickly, and was a member of Parramatta's NSW Cup side towards the end of their 2025 campaign, before making his first-grade debut in the penultimate round of the 2026 NRL season against the Cronulla Sharks. After re-signing with Parramatta, Talagi is contracted through to the end of 2029.
