= Mark Nawaqanitawase =

Australia dual-code rugby player (born 2000)

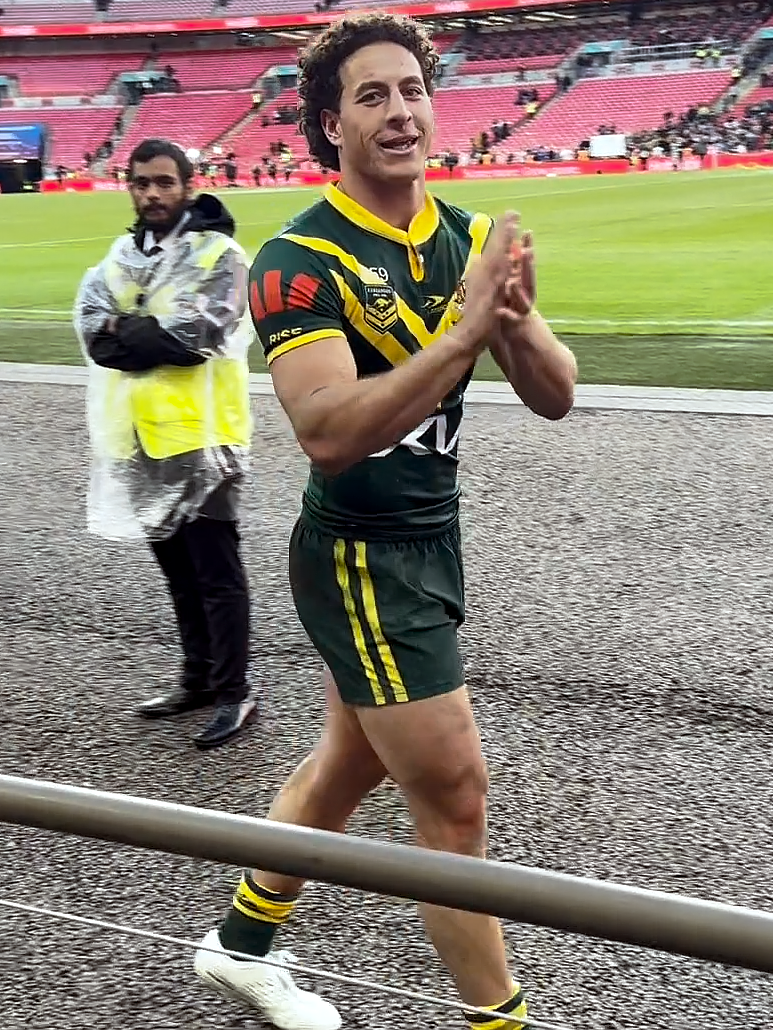

Personal information
- Full name: Mark Ermanno Dukutoko Nawaqanitawase
- Born: 11 September 2000 (age 26) Burwood, New South Wales, Australia
- Height: 190 cm (6 ft 3 in)
- Weight: 100 kg (15 st 10 lb)

Playing information

Rugby union
- Position: Wing
Club
Years	Team	Pld	T	G	FG	P
2018	Eastwood	17	9	0	0	45
2019	NSW Country Eagles	6	4	0	0	20
2020–24	Waratahs	58	23	0	0	115
2026–	Saitama Wild Knights	0	0	0	0	0
	Total	81	36	0	0	180
Representative
Years	Team	Pld	T	G	FG	P
2019	Australia U20	7	4	0	0	20
2022	Australia A	5	2	0	0	10
2022–23	Australia	11	6	0	0	30

Rugby league
- Position: Wing, Centre
Club
Years	Team	Pld	T	G	FG	P
2024–26	Sydney Roosters	47	47	0	0	188
Representative
Years	Team	Pld	T	G	FG	P
2025	Australia	3	0	0	0	0
2026	New South Wales	2	2	0	0	8
- Source: As of 30 October 2026

Mark Ermanno Dukutoko Nawaqanitawase (Fijian: [nawaŋanitaˈwaseh] na-wong-ah-nee-taw-WAW-zay; born 11 September 2000), nicknamed "Marky Mark", is an Australian professional rugby union footballer who plays as a winger or centre for the Saitama Wild Knights

He previously played rugby league as a winger for the Sydney Roosters in the NRL and for the Australia national rugby league team internationally. Nawaqanitawase also played rugby sevens at the 2024 Summer Olympics in Paris.

== Early life ==
Nawaqanitawase was born in Burwood, New South Wales, a suburb in Sydney's Inner West. He is of Fijian and Italian heritage. He played rugby league for Concord-Burwood Wolves and Leichhardt Wanderers in his youth, until he swapped over to rugby union aged 14.

== Club career ==
=== Schoolboy rugby union ===
Nawaqanitawase played schoolboy rugby for St Patrick's College, Strathfield. As an adult, he began his first-class career with Eastwood RFC in the Shute Shield competition.

With his similarities in height, position, body type, and playing style, Nawaqanitawase has been likened to former Waratahs fullback and dual Australia and Tonga representative Israel Folau.

=== 2018–19: NSW Country ===
Nawaqanitawase began his professional career in 2018, signing with the NSW Country Eagles in the National Rugby Championship. He scored his first professional try in a 24–24 draw against the Fijian Drua on 14 September 2019. He scored another three tries in a year which saw the Eagles win the Horan-Little Shield for the first time since 2016.

Following the 2019 season, the NRC competition was disbanded including franchises.

=== 2020–24: NSW Waratahs ===
Nawaqanitawase signed to the Waratahs squad for the 2020 season. He made his Super Rugby debut against the Crusaders on 1 February 2020, scoring two tries in a 42–23 loss. He scored another try the following week against the Blues. Nawaqanitawase finished his debut season having played 9 matches and scoring 4 tries.

In 2021, despite a disappointing year for the club, Nawaqanitawase extended his contract with the Waratahs until the end of the 2023 season.

Nawaqanitawase had a breakout 2022 Super Rugby Pacific season, starting in 10 of his 12 matches, scoring seven tries and playing a total of 842' minutes in a year which saw the Waratahs finish 6th on the ladder and reach the Quarter-finals.

=== 2024-26: Sydney Roosters and switch to rugby league ===
On 7 December 2023, it was announced that he would join the Sydney Roosters in the NRL for the 2025 season, with Roosters' winger Joseph Suaalii going in the opposite direction to rugby union following the conclusion of the 2024 season.

==== 2024 ====
Nawaqanitawase joined Sydney Roosters earlier in the 2024 season. On 24 August 2024, Nawaqanitawase scored a try on debut for the Roosters.

==== 2025 ====
During round eleven, Nawaqanitawase scored two tries during the Roosters' loss to Canterbury. His second try in the 67th minute was labelled the 'try of the decade', as he was going into touch but he hopped and kicked the ball before he went over the sideline and regathered it to score. In round 16, Nawaqanitawase scored two tries in the Roosters' 42-8 victory over North Queensland. In round 23, he scored a hat-trick in the Sydney Roosters 64-12 victory over the Dolphins. In Round 26, he scored four tries in a 40-10 victory over the Melbourne Storm. The following week, he scored another hat-trick in the club's 36-6 victory over arch-rivals South Sydney.

==== 2026 ====
In June, Nawaqanitawase was called into the New South Wales State of Origin squad for Game Two in the 2026 State of Origin series. He scored two tries as New South Wales were defeated by Queensland 44-24. In round 22 of the 2026 NRL season, he scored a hat-trick as the Sydney Roosters defeated North Queensland 82-12 which was the first time any first grade side had posted 80 points in a match since Eastern Suburbs achieved this feat in 1935 against Canterbury. Nawaqanitawase played in the 2026 NRL Grand Final which saw the Roosters overcome the Newcastle Knights 19-18. Nawaqanitawase scored two tries, in what was his final rugby league match before returning to union in 2027.

=== 2027-: Saitama Wild Knights and return to rugby union ===
In January 2026, The Sydney Morning Herald reported that Nawaqanitawase had signed a two-year deal for more than A$1 million a season to play for an unnamed club in the Japan Rugby League One (JRLO), with strong interest also coming from clubs in the French Top 14. Nawaqanitawase had advised the Sydney Roosters in September 2025 of his wish to depart the club upon the expiration of his contract in 2026, with the intent to pursue a return to rugby union in preparation for the 2027 Rugby World Cup in Australia. As he has been inactive internationally for Australia's first, second, and sevens national teams, Nawaqanitawase would be eligible to represent Australia, Fiji or Italy by the 2027 Rugby World Cup. The following month, Nawaqanitawase was confirmed to join the Saitama Wild Knights in the Japan Rugby League One (JRLO) ahead of the 2026–27 season.

== Representative career ==
=== Australia U-20 rugby union ===
Nawaqanitawase was a part of the U20 side that won their first title of the 2019 Oceania Rugby U20 Championship. Nawaqanitawase played twice and scored twice, with both tries being scored against Japan U20.

In the 2019 World Rugby U20 Championship, Nawaqanitawase played all five of the Junior Wallabies' matches, including the final against France in which he scored the second-fastest try in a World Rugby U20 Championship final. Unfortunately, the Junior Wallabies lost by one point: 23–24.

=== Australia sevens ===
Nawaqanitawase was named in the Australia sevens team for the 2024 Summer Olympics in Paris. The team finished in fourth place.

=== Australia Wallabies ===
In 2022, following an incredibly successful year with the Waratahs, Nawaqanitawase was named in the Australia A squad for the Pacific Nations Cup. Australia A finished runner–up in the tournament. Nawaqanitawase was again named in the Australia A squad for the three-match series against Japan. He played in two matches and scored two tries in the series win.

In 2022, Nawaqanitawase was named in the Australia squad for their 2022 spring tour. On 13 November 2022, Nawaqanitawase was named in the number 14 jersey in his debut match against Italy which the Wallabies lost 28 to 27. On 27 November, he scored two tries against Wales helping leading the Wallabies to a 39 to 34 win.

Nawaqanitawase represented Australia at the 2023 Rugby World Cup.

In October 2026, upon becoming eligible to play international rugby union again, Nawaqanitawase reportedly considered switching nationality to either Fiji or Italy.

=== Australia Kangaroos ===
Nawaqanitawase made his debut for the Australian Kangaroos against England at Wembley Stadium in the first 2025 Rugby League Ashes game on 25 October 2025. Australia would win 26-6. By debuting, he became the 49th dual-code rugby international for Australia.

== Career statistics ==
=== NRL statistics ===
As of 7 October 2026.

Year	Team	Games	Tries	Pts
2024	Sydney Roosters	1	1	4
2025	Sydney Roosters	23	24	96
2026	Sydney Roosters	24	23	92
	Totals	48	48	192

=== International statistics ===
As of 5 September 2025.

Year	Team	Games	Tries	Pts
2025	Australia	3	0	0
	Totals	3	0	0

== Honours ==
=== Sydney Roosters ===
- NRL Premiership
  - Winner (1): 2026

=== New South Wales ===
- State of Origin
  - Winner (1): 2026

=== Australia ===
- Ashes
  - Winner (1): 2025
