= Hamiso Tabuai-Fidow =

Australia & Samoa international rugby league footballer

Hamiso Tabuai Fidow
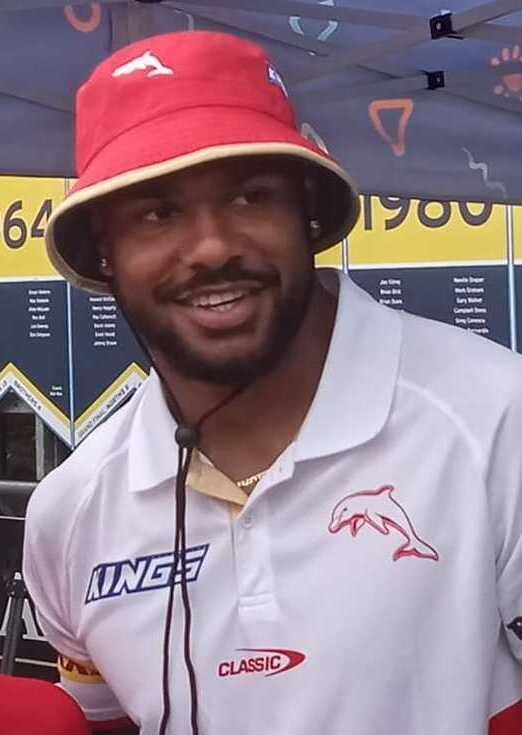

Personal information
- Full name: Hamiso Tabuai-Fidow
- Born: 5 September 2001 (age 25) Cairns, Queensland, Australia
- Height: 186 cm (6 ft 1 in)
- Weight: 89 kg (14 st 0 lb)

Playing information
- Position: Fullback, Centre, Wing
Club
Years	Team	Pld	T	G	FG	P
2020–22	North Qld Cowboys	50	21	0	0	84
2023–	Dolphins	78	66	0	0	264
	Total	128	87	0	0	348
Representative
Years	Team	Pld	T	G	FG	P
2021–26	Queensland	13	14	0	0	56
2022–25	Indigenous All Stars	2	1	0	0	4
2022–	Samoa	5	4	0	0	16
2023	Prime Minister's XIII	1	0	0	0	0
2023–24	Australia	6	4	0	0	16
- Source: As of 22 November 2026

Hamiso Tabuai-Fidow (born 5 September 2001), nicknamed "Hammer", is a professional rugby league footballer who plays as a fullback for the Dolphins in the National Rugby League (NRL) and as a centre for Queensland in the State of Origin.

He previously played for the North Queensland Cowboys in the NRL. He has played for Samoa and Australia at international level. He has represented the Indigenous All Stars in the All-Stars match and has played for the Prime Minister's XIII. Tabuai-Fidow played as a winger earlier in his career.

== Background ==
Born and raised in Cairns, Queensland to an Indigenous Australian Torres Strait Islander mother and a Samoan father, Tabuai-Fidow played his junior rugby league for the Cairns Kangaroos. He also played junior Australian rules football, being named one of the best in AFL Cape York's Crusaders and Peninsula representatives teams in the 2013 Queensland state underage championships and after a best on ground performance for Cairns Hawks in an AFL Cairns under-15s grand final at Cazalys Stadium in 2016 was signed up to the Gold Coast Suns Academy.

Tabuai-Fidow later admitted he looked up to Buddy Franklin in his younger years and was "pretty close to signing" with the Suns, but ultimately the club was unsuccessful in their attempt to relocate him to the Gold Coast and instead he accepted a scholarship to play rugby union for Brisbane Grammar School and said he would enjoy playing for the Reds or Wallabies one day. While living in Brisbane, Tabuai-Fidow was a member of the Queensland Reds rugby union development squad before being signed by the North Queensland Cowboys rugby league club in 2017. He then relocated to Townsville in 2018 and completed his schooling at Kirwan State High School.

== Playing career ==
=== Early career (2018–2019) ===
In 2018, Tabuai-Fidow played for the Cairns-based Northern Pride's Mal Meninga Cup team, scoring five tries in seven games. In 2019, he moved to Townsville, joined the North Queensland under-20 squad, and played for the Townsville Blackhawks Mal Meninga Cup team, where he scored thirteen tries in six games. Following the Mal Meninga Cup competition, he started at fullback for the Queensland under-18 team in their win over New South Wales.

He then moved up to the Blackhawks' Hastings Deering Colts side, where he scored eight tries in five games. In June 2019, he re-signed with the North Queensland side until the end of the 2022 season. On 29 September 2019, he started at centre for the Australian Schoolboys, scoring two tries in their win over the Junior Kiwis.

=== North Queensland Cowboys (2020–2022) ===
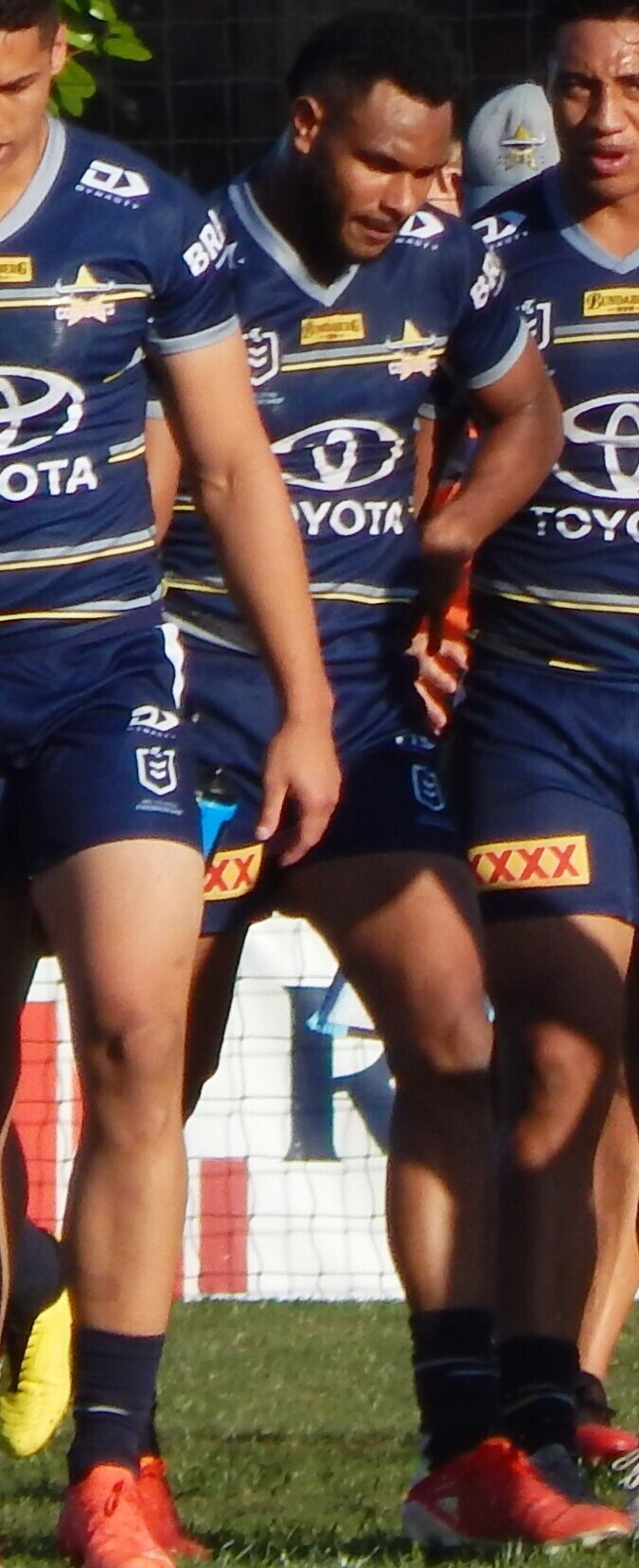
Tabuai-Fidow playing for the North Queensland Cowboys in 2021

In 2020, Tabuai-Fidow joined the North Queensland Cowboys NRL squad and was a member of their 2020 NRL Nines winning side, finishing the tournament as the equal leading try scorer. In round 5 of the 2020 NRL season, Tabuai-Fidow made his NRL debut against the New Zealand Warriors, setting up two tries in a 26–37 loss. In round 7, he scored his first NRL try in a 32–20 win over the Newcastle Knights. In his rookie season, Tabuai-Fidow played 14 games and scored six tries. On 3 October, he was named the North Queensland club's Rookie of the Year.

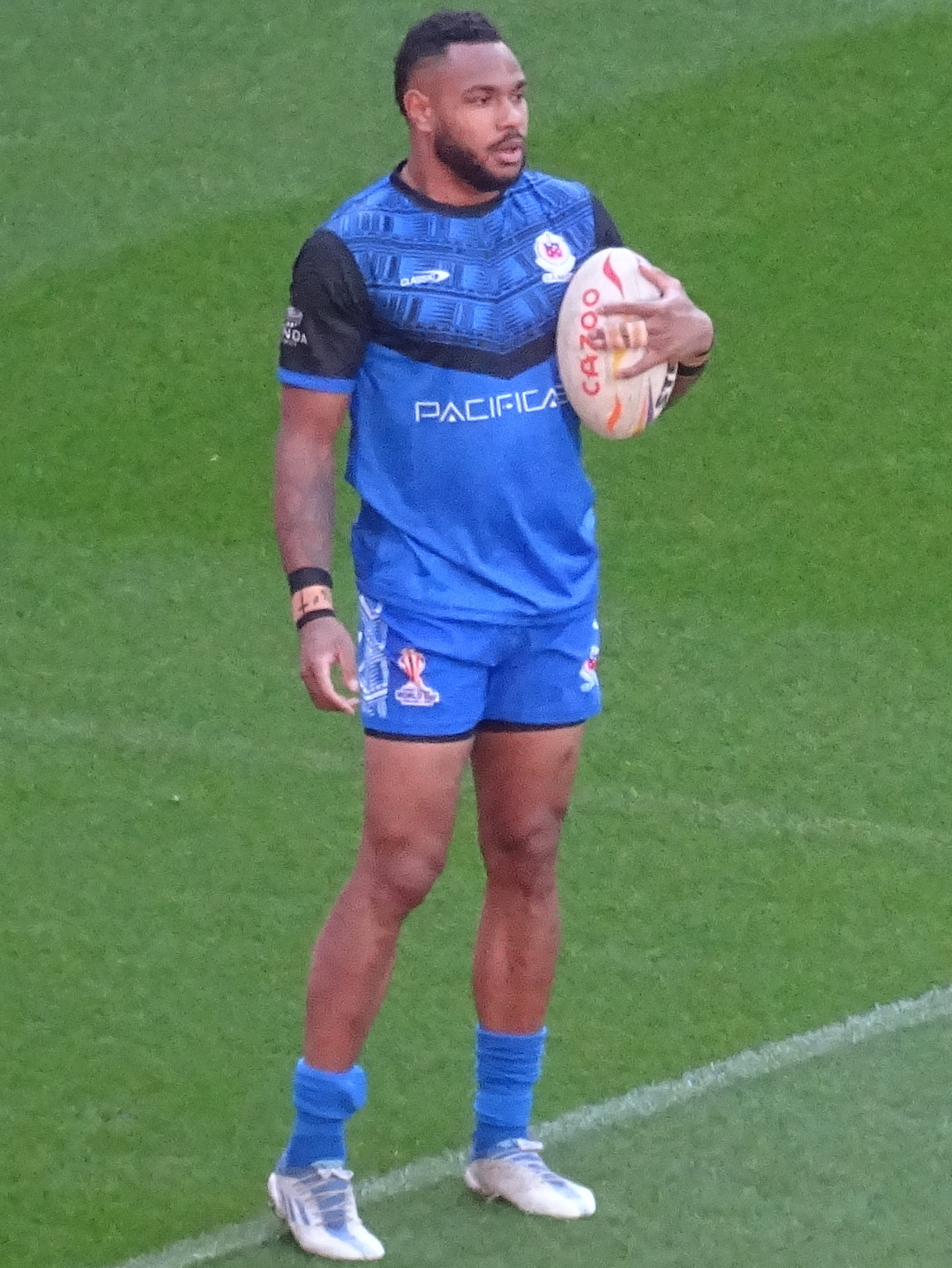
Tabuai-Fidow playing for Samoa in 2022

Tabuai-Fidow was selected by Queensland for game 3 of the 2021 State of Origin series which Queensland won 20–18. On 21 July, it was announced that Tabuai-Fidow would be out for six weeks after undergoing an emergency appendectomy.

In round 13 of the 2022 NRL season, he scored two tries for North Queensland in a 32–6 victory over the Gold Coast.

Tabuai-Fidow played 23 games for North Queensland throughout the year and scored seven tries. He played in both of the clubs finals games including their preliminary final loss against Parramatta at the Queensland Country Bank Stadium. On 5 October, he signed a two-year deal to join the newly admitted Dolphins side starting in 2023.

In October, Tabuai-Fidow was named in the Samoa squad for the 2021 Rugby League World Cup and played one game late 2022 in England.

=== Dolphins (2023–present) ===
In round 1 of the 2023 NRL season, Tabuai-Fidow scored the first try in the Dolphins' NRL history. The following week, he scored two tries as the Dolphins defeated Canberra 20–14.

In round 6, Tabuai-Fidow scored two tries in the Dolphins' 32–22 victory over his former club, the North Queensland Cowboys, at Queensland Country Bank Stadium and became the second player in first-grade Australian Rugby League history to score at least one try in each of the first six games of their team's inaugural season, after Eastern Suburbs winger Horrie Miller in the 1908 NSWRFL season.

Prior to round 8, the Dolphins extended Hamiso Tabuai-Fidow's contract until at least the end of the 2027 season. In Round 9, he scored a try in the Dolphins 30–31 loss to the Canberra Raiders at McDonalds Park, Wagga Wagga. In round 10 against the Cronulla Sutherland Sharks at Suncorp Stadium, Tabuai-Fidow scored a try for the Dolphins in their 36–16 victory.

In May, Tabuai-Fidow was selected to play for Queensland as a centre in Game I of the 2023 State of Origin series against New South Wales on 31 May at Adelaide Oval in South Australia. In the series opener, Tabuai-Fidow scored two tries as Queensland defeated New South Wales 26–18.

Tabuai-Fidow holds a number of first tryscorer records for the Dolphins by virtue of playing in their inaugural season. He is the first Dolphin to score in an NRL game, the first Dolphin to score at home venues Suncorp Stadium and Kayo Stadium, and the first Dolphin to score in a representative game (Game 1 of the 2023 State of Origin series).

In October, Tabuai-Fidow was selected to play for Australia in the 2023 Pacific Championships.

Following the Dolphins defeat against Brisbane in round 6 of the 2024 NRL season, it was announced that Tabuai-Fidow would miss at least four weeks with a hamstring injury.

Tabuai-Fidow was named in the centres for Queensland ahead of game one in the 2024 State of Origin series. In game one, Tabuai-Fidow scored a hat-trick in Queensland's 38–10 victory over New South Wales. He played a total of 16 games for the Dolphins in the 2024 NRL season and scored 15 tries as the club finished 10th on the table. In round 6 of the 2025 NRL season, Tabuai-Fidow scored a hat-trick for the Dolphins in their 30–12 upset victory over Penrith. In round 17, Tabuai-Fidow scored four tries in the Dolphins 50–28 victory over South Sydney. In May, Tabuai-Fidow was selected by Queensland ahead of the 2025 State of Origin series. Queensland would win the series 2–1.. In the 2026 State of Origin series, Tabuai-Fidow retained his centre position for Queensland. He appeared in all 3 matches, and scored a try in each as Queensland lost the series 2–1. He played 21 matches for the club in the 2026 NRL season including their preliminary final loss to eventual premiers the Sydney Roosters.

On 2 October 2026, the Dolphins announced that Tabuai-Fidow had re-signed with the Dolphins until the end of 2029.

== Achievements and accolades ==
=== Individual ===
- North Queensland Cowboys Rookie of the Year: 2020
- Dolphins Fan-Voted MVP (Most Valuable Player): 2023

== Statistics ==
Year	Team	Games	Tries	Points
2020	North Queensland Cowboys	14	6	24
2021	North Queensland Cowboys	13	8	32
2022	North Queensland Cowboys	23	7	28
2023	Dolphins	20	15	60
2024	Dolphins	16	15	60
2025	Dolphins	21	22	88
2026	Dolphins	21	14	56
2027	Dolphins			
	Total	128	87	348
