= Sam Walker (rugby league) =

Australia international rugby league footballer

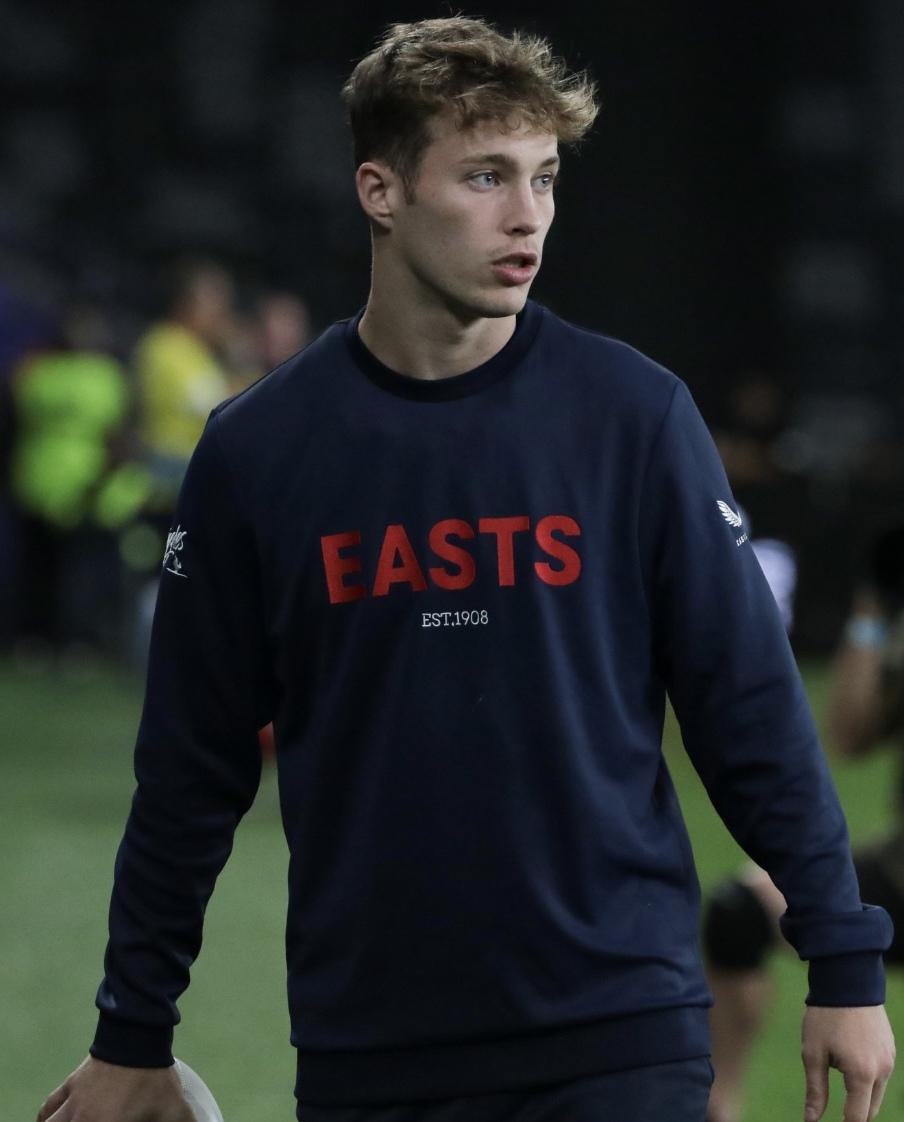

Personal information
- Full name: Samuel Walker
- Born: 16 June 2002 (age 24) Leeds, West Yorkshire, England
- Height: 183 cm (6 ft 0 in)
- Weight: 78 kg (12 st 4 lb)

Playing information
- Position: Halfback, Five-eighth
Club
Years	Team	Pld	T	G	FG	P
2021–	Sydney Roosters	109	36	343	8	838
Representative
Years	Team	Pld	T	G	FG	P
2022	Prime Minister's XIII	1	1	0	0	4
2026	Queensland	3	0	12	0	24
2026–	Australia	1	1	6	0	16
- Source: As of 16 November 2026
- Father: Ben Walker
- Relatives: Shane Walker (uncle); Chris Walker (uncle); Katie Walker (aunt)

Samuel Walker (born 16 June 2002) is an Australian professional rugby league footballer who plays as a halfback for the Sydney Roosters in the NRL and for Australia at international level.

He has played for the Prime Minister's XIII at representative level. He has also played as a five-eighth.

== Background ==
Walker was born in Leeds, West Yorkshire, England, while his Australian father Ben, a professional rugby league player, was playing for the Leeds Rhinos in the Super League. The Walker family moved back to Australia when Sam was a one year old in 2003, initially living on the Gold Coast where he began playing junior rugby league for the Burleigh Bears at seven years of age while his uncle was playing for the Gold Coast Titans, before moving to Ipswich at the age of 10, where he continued his junior rugby league with the North Ipswich Tigers. He attended Ipswich Grammar School in his teenage years and was signed to a development deal with the Brisbane Broncos.

Walker's uncles Shane and Chris are also former professional rugby league players.

== Playing career ==
In 2019, Walker played for the Ipswich Jets in the Mal Meninga Cup. On 5 June 2019, he started at halfback for Queensland under-18 in their 34–12 win over New South Wales. On 11 June 2019, he signed with the Sydney Roosters on a two-year deal.

On 29 September 2019, Walker represented the Australian Schoolboys, scoring a try in their 36–20 win over the Junior Kiwis.

In 2020, Walker joined the Roosters' NRL squad but did not play a single game that year due to the COVID-19 pandemic and the cancellation of the NSW Cup and Jersey Flegg Cup competitions. In round 15 of the 2020 NRL season, he was included in the Roosters 21-man squad to play the Wests Tigers but was omitted from the side before the game.

=== 2021 ===
On 27 February, Walker played in the Sydney Roosters’ pre-season trial win over the Canberra Raiders, scoring a try. He began the 2021 season playing for North Sydney, the Roosters' NSW Cup feeder team.

In round 4 of the 2021 NRL season, following an injury to Roosters halfback Luke Keary, Walker made his first-grade debut for the Sydney Roosters against the New Zealand Warriors at the Sydney Cricket Ground, assisting a try and scoring a conversion as his side won 32–12. The following week, he scored his first try in the NRL and set up three others in a pivotal performance as the Roosters went from being 4–18 down to the Cronulla-Sutherland Sharks, to mounting a comeback to win 26–18.

In round 14, Walker kicked the winning field goal as the Sydney Roosters defeated the Gold Coast Titans 35–34.

In round 17, with just under 20 seconds left to play, Walker bizarrely ran 90 metres in the opposite direction before running over the sideline as the Sydney Roosters defeated Canterbury-Bankstown 22–16.

In round 22, Walker kicked the match winning field goal against the Brisbane Broncos at Suncorp Stadium. The following week, in round 23, Walker was benched, with Lachlan Lam starting at halfback instead. Walker came off the bench and scored a try in the 40-22 win v the Dragons. Walker returned to the starting side the following week in round 24 against the Rabbitohs but lost 54-12. Walker was then once again benched for the rest of the season with Drew Hutchison and Lam preferred in the halves.

In week 1 of the finals, against the Gold Coast Titans, Walker kicked the winning field goal in the 77th minute of the game, as the Roosters went on to win the match 25–24. On 27 September, Walker was named Dally M Rookie of the year.

=== 2022 ===
In Round 1, following the return of Roosters half Keary, Walker played at five-eighth for the first time. Walker played the first 15 games of the season in the No.6 jersey for 7 wins and 8 losses. In Round 16, following an injury to Keary, Roosters coach Trent Robinson moved Walker back to halfback. They lost Round 16, 26-18 to eventual 2022 premiers, Penrith Panthers but would gone on to win their next 8 games in a row, with Walker retaining the halfback role upon Keary's return with Keary returning to his favoured no.6 role.

In round 18 of the 2022 NRL season, Walker scored one try and kicked nine goals in the Sydney Roosters 54–26 victory over St. George Illawarra. In round 23, Walker kicked twelve goals from twelve attempts in the club's 72–6 victory over the Wests Tigers. Walker played a total of 25 games for the club in the 2022 season and finished as their top point scorer with 211 points. Walker played for the Sydney Roosters in their elimination final loss to South Sydney. On 7 December 2022, Walker signed a two-year contract extension to remain at the Sydney Roosters until the end of the 2025 season.

=== 2023 ===
Following the Sydney Roosters loss against Cronulla in round 7 of the 2023 NRL season, Walker was demoted to reserve grade. Walker spoke to the media after being demoted saying "I never wanted to get dropped, but I will work as hard as I possibly can to get a spot back in the team". In July, Walker suffered an ACL sprain whilst playing in the NSW Cup and was ruled out for an indefinite period. In round 26 of the 2023 NRL season, Walker returned to the Sydney Roosters side in their victory over the Wests Tigers. In the first week of the 2023 finals series, Walker kicked a field goal with three minutes remaining to win the match 13-12 against Cronulla.

=== 2024 ===
In round 3 of the 2024 NRL season, Walker scored two tries for the Sydney Roosters in their 48-6 victory over arch-rivals South Sydney. In round 22, Walker scored two tries and kicked eight goals in the Sydney Roosters 40-34 victory over the Dolphins. Walker would suffer a season ending knee injury in the Sydney Roosters round 26 loss against Canberra. Walker would be ruled out for up to nine months after suffering an ACL tear. On 4 November, the Roosters announced that Walker had re-signed with the club until the end of 2027.

=== 2025 ===
In round 15 of the 2025 NRL season, Walker was scheduled to make his long-awaited return to the Sydney Roosters side however he broke his thumb in a training session and was ruled out for a further four weeks. Walker was limited to just nine games for the Sydney Roosters in the 2025 NRL season as the club finished 8th on the table and qualified for the finals. He played in the clubs elimination final loss against Cronulla.

=== 2026 ===
He made his Queensland debut in Game 1 of the 2026 State of Origin on 27 May 2026 in the 22-20 defeat; he scored 4 goals. In round 22 of the 2026 NRL season, Walker scored a hat-trick and kicked twelve goals as the Sydney Roosters defeated North Queensland 82-12 which was the first time any first grade side had posted 80 points in a match since Eastern Suburbs achieved this feat in 1935 against Canterbury. Walker played for the Sydney Roosters in their 19-18 victory over the Newcastle Knights in the 2026 NRL Grand Final on 4 October 2026, winning his first NRL Premiership.

He made his Australia international début in the 2026 Rugby League World Cup 36-22 win over Fiji on 25 October 2026, scoring a try and 6 goals.

== Statistics ==
Year	Team	Games	Tries	Goals	FGs	Pts
2021	Sydney Roosters	21	8	23	3	81
2022	Sydney Roosters	25	7	91	1	211
2023	Sydney Roosters	10	3	20	2	54
2024	Sydney Roosters	21	7	88		204
2025	Sydney Roosters	7		39	1	79
2026	Sydney Roosters	22	11	79	1	203
2027	Sydney Roosters					
	Totals	109	36	343	8	838

== Honours ==
Representative

- Rugby League World Cup Champion: 2026
