= Selwyn Cobbo =

Australia international rugby league footballer

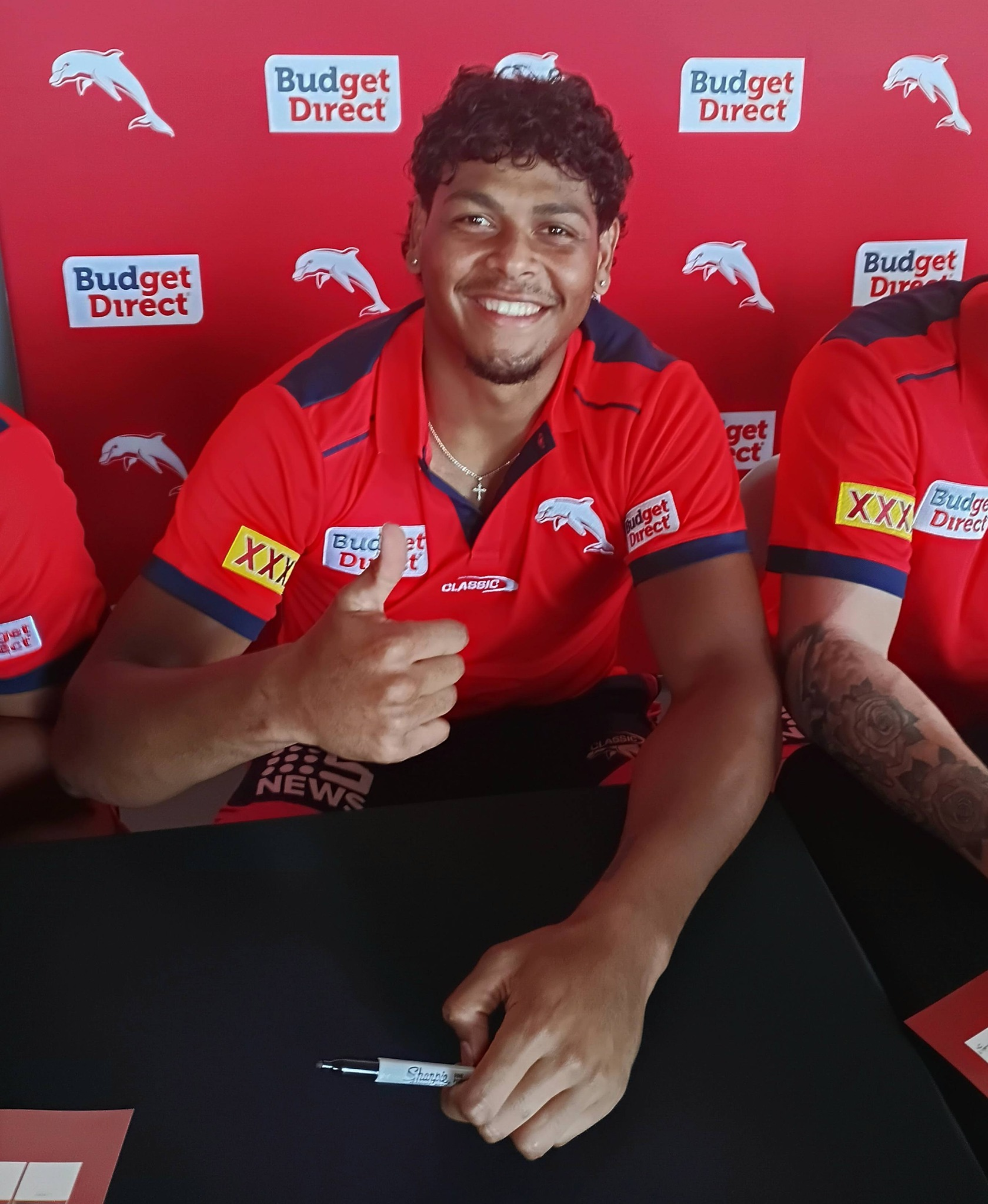

Personal information
- Born: 5 June 2002 (age 24) Cherbourg, Queensland, Australia
- Height: 192 cm (6 ft 4 in)
- Weight: 105 kg (16 st 7 lb)

Playing information
- Position: Wing, Centre, Fullback
Club
Years	Team	Pld	T	G	FG	P
2021–25	Brisbane Broncos	83	49	5	0	206
2026–	Dolphins	20	18	0	0	72
	Total	103	67	5	0	278
Representative
Years	Team	Pld	T	G	FG	P
2022–23	Indigenous All Stars	2	3	0	0	12
2022–26	Queensland	9	6	0	0	24
2022	Prime Minister's XIII	1	2	0	0	8
2023	Australia	1	0	0	0	0
- Source: As of 19 November 2026

Selwyn Cobbo (born 5 June 2002) is an Australian professional rugby league footballer who plays as a winger, centre and fullback for the Dolphins in the National Rugby League.

He previously played for the Brisbane Broncos in the NRL.

Cobbo has also played at representative level for Queensland in the State of Origin series and Australia internationally.

== Background ==
Cobbo was born in Cherbourg, Queensland, Australia, and is the great-great grandson of Eddie Gilbert. Cobbo attended Murgon State High School and was the first Indigenous student to be their school captain.

== Playing career ==
Cobbo played junior rugby league for the Cherbourg Hornets and Gympie Devils.

=== Brisbane Broncos (2021-2025) ===
In Round 13 of the 2021 NRL season, Cobbo made his first grade debut for the Brisbane Broncos on the wing against St. George Illawarra Dragons at Kogarah Oval which ended in a 52–24 loss.

Cobbo played fullback in the 2021 Queensland Cup Grand Final for the Wynnum-Manly Seagulls, which the club ultimately lost 16-10 against the Norths Devils.

=== 2022 ===
In Round 7 of the 2022 NRL season, Cobbo scored two tries for Brisbane in a 34-14 victory over Canterbury. In round 10, Cobbo scored a hat-trick in Brisbane's 38-0 victory over Manly-Warringah. The following week in round 11, Cobbo scored a further two tries in a 36-12 victory over Newcastle. He then scored another try the following week in a 35-24 comeback victory over the Gold Coast Titans.

Following a sensational start to the year with 10 tries in 12 games, Cobbo was selected to make his State of Origin debut in Game 1 of the 2022 State of Origin series on the right wing, setting up a crucial try 5 minutes before halftime for centre Dane Gagai. Cobbo would play all three games in a series win for Queensland. In round 22 of the 2022 NRL season, Cobbo scored a hat-trick in Brisbane's 28-10 victory over Newcastle.

=== 2023 ===
In January, Cobbo came under criticism after comments he made about Brisbane coach Kevin Walter on the Back of the 135 podcast in November 2022. Cobbo said at the time “He's a good person and a good bloke but I don't think he's a good coach, He's not the best coach but he's alright. He does a lot for the club but the way he coaches is a bit weird". Cobbo later apologised for the comments and stated that his words were taken out of context. The Broncos fined Cobbo $15,000 over the incident. In round 10 of the 2023 NRL season, Cobbo scored a hat-trick in Brisbane's 32-6 victory over Manly. In May, Cobbo was selected by Queensland for game one of the 2023 State of Origin series. In the series opener, Cobbo scored two tries as Queensland defeated New South Wales 26-18. In round 18, Cobbo scored a hat-trick in Brisbane's 24-16 victory over the Dolphins in the Brisbane derby. In round 26, Cobbo scored another hat-trick in Brisbane's 29-18 victory over Canberra. Cobbo played 24 games for Brisbane in the 2023 NRL season and scored 20 tries. Cobbo played in Brisbane's 26-24 loss against Penrith in the 2023 NRL Grand Final.

=== 2024 ===
In round 6 of the 2024 NRL season, Cobbo scored two tries for Brisbane in the derby victory over the Dolphins, Cobbo would also receive the Battle Medal for man of the match the second time he's received the Battle Medal. Cobbo was named on the bench for Queensland ahead of game one in the 2024 State of Origin series. Cobbo missed selection for the following games however due to a hand injury sustained in a gamer rage incident. On 29 July, Cobbo was questioned by police after allegations of a domestic disturbance.

Cobbo played 19 games for Brisbane in the 2024 NRL season which saw the club miss the finals finishing 12th on the table.

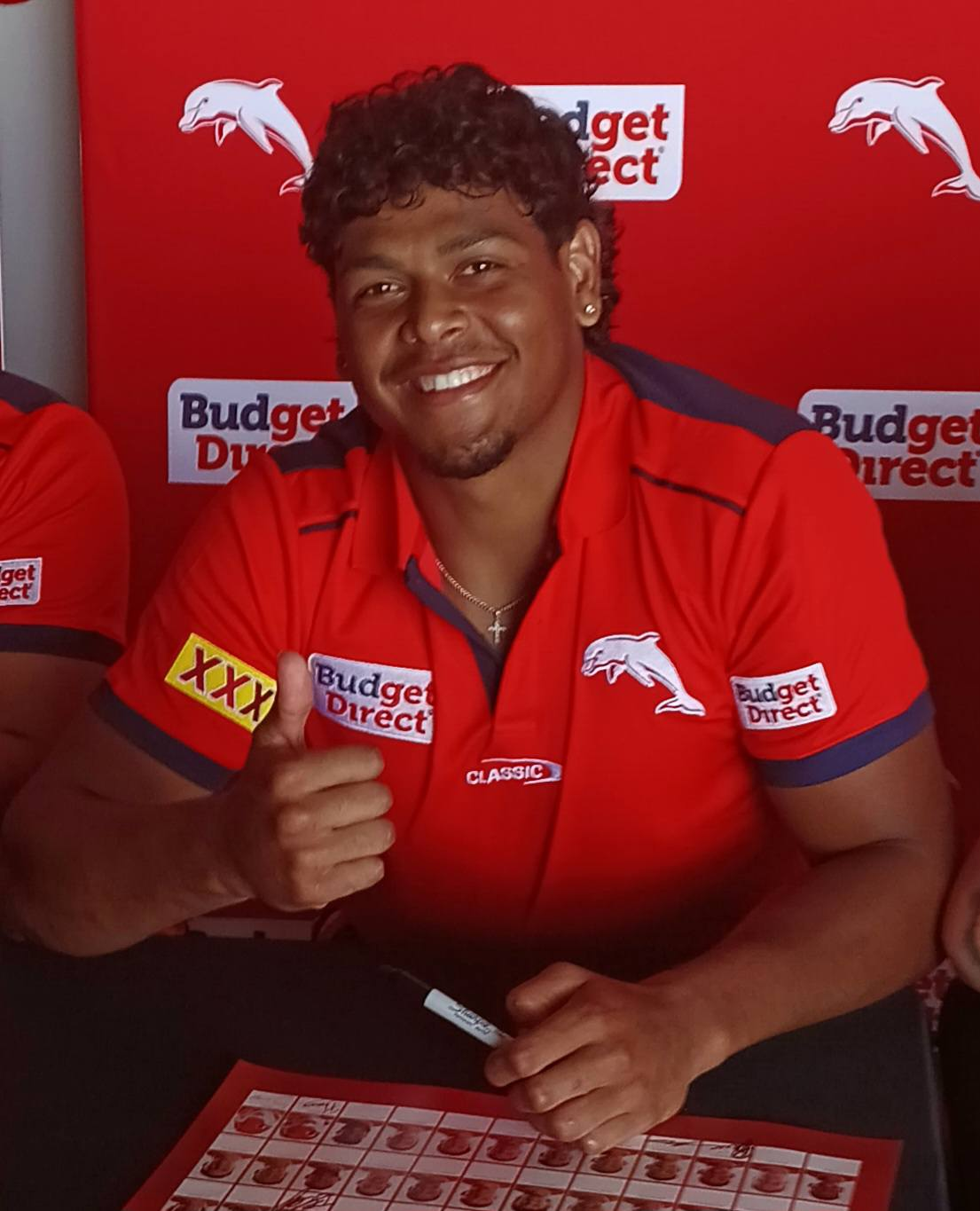
Selwyn Cobbo 2026

=== 2025 ===
In round 1 of the 2025 NRL season, Cobbo scored a hat-trick in Brisbane's 50-14 victory over the Sydney Roosters.

=== 2026 ===
On 27 June 2025, the Dolphins announced that they had signed Cobbo for the 2026 season. On 21 April 2026, the Dolphins announced that Cobbo had extended his contract with the club for a further year. In May, Cobbo was selected by Queensland ahead of the 2026 State of Origin series. In Game Two, Cobbo scored a hat-trick in Queensland's 44-24 victory. On 18 September 2026, the Dolphins announced that Cobbo had re-signed with the club until 2031. Cobbo played 20 games for the club in the 2026 NRL season including their preliminary final loss to eventual premiers the Sydney Roosters.

== Honours ==
Representative

- 2022 State of Origin series Winners
- 2023 State of Origin series Winners

== Statistics ==
=== Club ===
Season	Team	Matches	T	G	GK %	F/G	Pts
2021	Brisbane	7	2	2	100%	0	12
2022	Brisbane	18	15	0	-	0	60
2023	Brisbane	24	20	0	-	0	80
2024	Brisbane	19	6	0	-	0	24
2025	Brisbane	15	6	3	100%	0	30
2026	Dolphins	20	18				72
2027	Dolphins						
Career totals		103	67	5	100%	0	278
