= Robert Toia =

Tonga international rugby league player (born 2004)

Robert To'ia
Personal information
- Full name: Robert To'ia
- Born: 11 August 2004 (age 22) Auckland, New Zealand
- Height: 183 cm (6 ft 0 in)
- Weight: 100 kg (15 st 10 lb)

Playing information
- Position: Centre
Club
Years	Team	Pld	T	G	FG	P
2025–	Sydney Roosters	46	22	0	0	88
Representative
Years	Team	Pld	T	G	FG	P
2025–26	Queensland	6	1	0	0	4
2025–	Tonga	3	1	0	0	4
- Source: As of 16 November 2026

Robert To'ia (born 11 August 2004) is a Tonga international rugby league footballer who plays as a centre for the Sydney Roosters in the National Rugby League.

== Background ==
Toia, who is of Tongan descent, was born in Auckland, New Zealand. He was originally raised in Onehunga (New Zealand) as a youngster before moving to Brisbane at six years of age where he played junior rugby league for the Redcliffe Dolphins. He attended St Joseph's College, Nudgee before being signed by the Sydney Roosters at the age of 14.

== Playing career ==
=== Early career ===
In 2021, Toia played for the Central Coast Roosters in the Harold Matthews Cup and represented Queensland City under-17 in their win over Queensland Country.

In 2022, he moved up to the Sydney Roosters' SG Ball Cup team. Later that season, he played for their Jersey Flegg Cup team and represented Queensland under-19. His season was then ended when he ruptured his ACL for the first time. That same year, he rejected an offer to return to the Dolphins first grade side and stay with the Roosters instead.

In 2023, Toia returned from his ACL injury, playing for the Roosters and the North Sydney Bears in the New South Wales Cup. His season ended after just six games due to a broken jaw and then ruptured his ACL for the second time in training.

In June 2024, he again recovered from his ACL injury, playing six games for the Roosters' NSW Cup team.

=== 2025 ===
In Round 1 of the 2025 NRL season, Toia made his NRL debut against the Brisbane Broncos at Allianz Stadium. In May, Toia was selected to represent Queensland in Game 1 of the annual State of Origin series after only 10 matches in the NRL. Toia played in all three games for Queensland as they upset New South Wales 2-1 to win the series. Toia played 22 games in the 2025 NRL season as the club finished 8th on the table and qualified for the finals. He played in the clubs elimination final loss against Cronulla. He finished the season by winning the 2025 NRL Dally M rookie of the year. On 28 November 2025, the Roosters announced that Toia had re-signed with the club until the end of 2029.

=== 2026 ===
Toia played 24 games for the Sydney Roosters in the 2026 NRL season including the clubs 2026 NRL Grand Final victory over Newcastle.

== Statistics ==
Year	Team	Games	Tries	Pts
2025	Sydney Roosters	22	7	28
2026	Sydney Roosters	23	15	60
2027	Sydney Roosters			
	Totals	46	22	88

== Honours ==
Individual

- Dally M Rookie of the Year: 2025
- Dally M Centre of the Year: 2026

Queensland

- State of Origin Series: 2025
