= List of Dolphins (NRL) players =

Dolphins (NRL) players

This article lists all rugby league footballers who have played first-grade for the Dolphins in the Australian National Rugby League (NRL) competition.

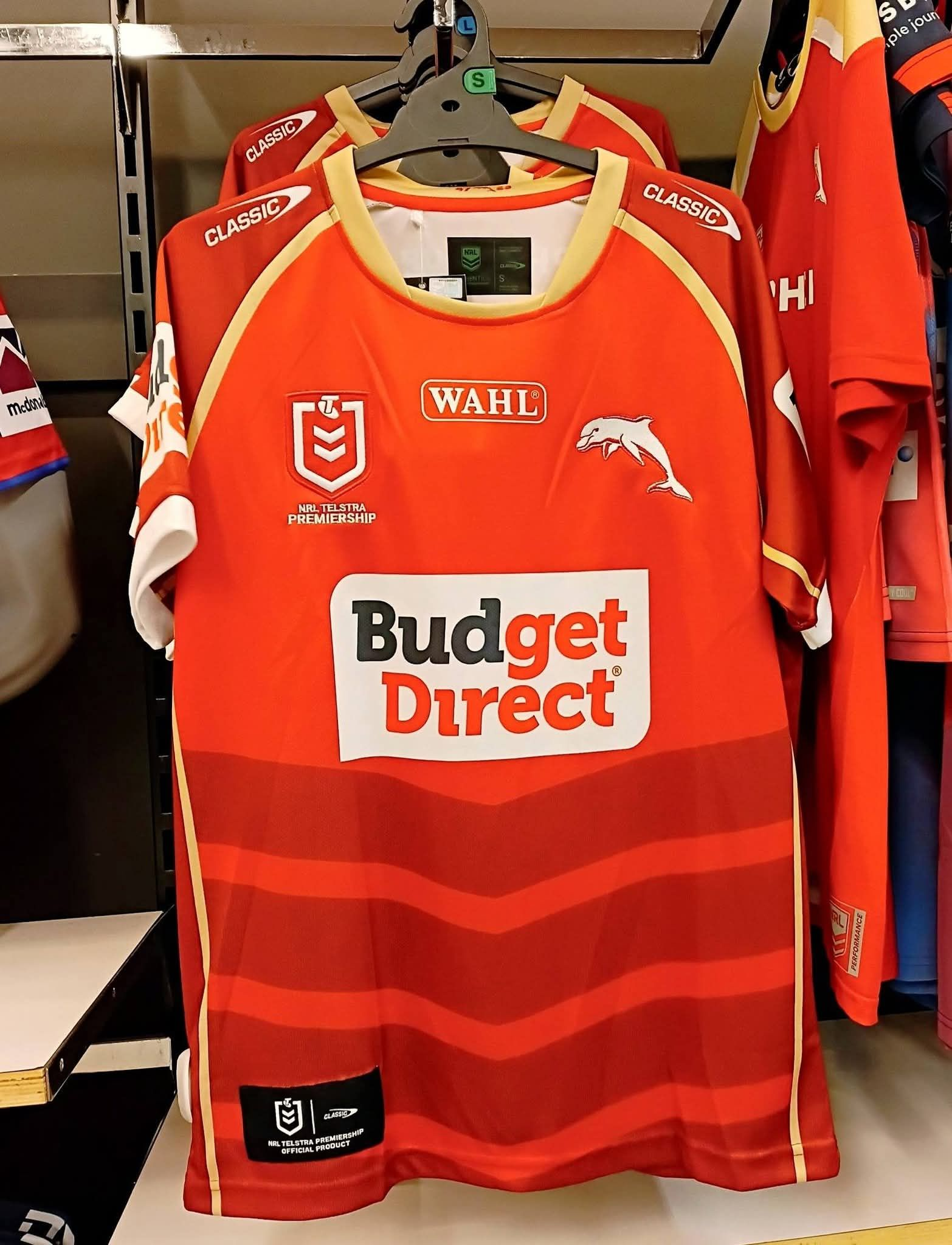
Dolphins NRL 2026 home jersey

== Notes ==
- Debut:
  - Players are listed in the order of their debut game with the club.
  - Players who debuted in the same game are ordered by teamlist position.
- Appearances: Dolphins games only, not a total of their career games. For example, Jesse Bromwich played a career total of 338 first-grade games but of those, 43 were at the Dolphins.
- Previous club: refers to the previous first-grade rugby league club (NRL or Super League) that the player played at and does not refer to any junior club, rugby union club or a rugby league club that he was signed to but never played at.
- The statistics in this table are correct as of round 13 of the 2026 NRL season.

== List of players ==
Cap no.	Name	Nationality	Career span	Debut round	Previous club	Appearances	Tries	Goals	Field goals	Points
1	Hamiso Tabuai-Fidow	(Australia) (Samoa)	2023−	Rd. 1	North Queensland Cowboys	67	59	0	0	236
2	Jamayne Isaako	(New Zealand) (Samoa)	2023−	Rd. 1	Gold Coast Titans	83	57	324	3	879
3	Euan Aitken	(Australia) (Scotland)	2023−24	Rd. 1	New Zealand Warriors	36	6	0	0	24
4	Brenko Lee	(Australia) (Tonga)	2023	Rd. 1	Brisbane Broncos	13	0	0	0	0
5	Tesi Niu	(Tonga)	2023−24	Rd. 1	Brisbane Broncos	24	9	0	0	36
6	Isaiya Katoa	(Tonga)	2023−	Rd. 1	Debut	79	6	1	0	26
7	Sean O'Sullivan	(Australia)	2023−25	Rd. 1	Penrith Panthers	28	2	2	1	14
8	Jesse Bromwich	(New Zealand)	2023−24	Rd. 1	Melbourne Storm	43	2	0	0	8
9	Jeremy Marshall-King	(New Zealand)	2023−	Rd. 1	Canterbury Bulldogs	54	9	0	0	36
10	Jarrod Wallace	(Australia)	2023−24	Rd. 1	Gold Coast Titans	21	4	0	0	16
11	Felise Kaufusi	(Tonga) (Australia)	2023−	Rd. 1	Melbourne Storm	57	3	0	0	12
12	Kenny Bromwich	(New Zealand)	2023−25	Rd. 1	Melbourne Storm	44	4	0	0	16
13	Tom Gilbert	(Australia)	2023−	Rd. 1	North Queensland Cowboys	32	2	0	0	8
14	Connelly Lemuelu	(New Zealand) (Samoa)	2023−	Rd. 1	North Queensland Cowboys	72	18	0	0	72
15	Mark Nicholls	(Australia)	2023−25	Rd. 1	South Sydney Rabbitohs	66	8	1	0	34
16	Ray Stone	(Australia)	2023−	Rd. 1	Parramatta Eels	71	6	0	0	24
17	Kurt Donoghoe	(Fiji)	2023−	Rd. 1	Debut	44	4	0	0	16
18	Mason Teague	(Australia) (Fiji)	2023−24	Rd. 2	Debut	8	0	0	0	0
19	Kodi Nikorima	(New Zealand)	2023−	Rd. 3	South Sydney Rabbitohs	70	16	1	0	66
20	Anthony Milford	(Australia) (Samoa)	2023−24	Rd. 4	Newcastle Knights	13	3	0	0	12
21	Poasa Faamausili	(New Zealand) (Samoa)	2023	Rd. 4	St. George Illawarra Dragons	4	0	0	0	0
22	Jack Bostock	(Australia)	2023−	Rd. 5	Debut	44	29	0	0	116
23	Herman Ese'ese	(Samoa) (New Zealand)	2023	Rd. 5	Gold Coast Titans	20	0	0	0	0
24	Edrick Lee	(Australia)	2023	Rd. 6	Newcastle Knights	1	0	0	0	0
25	Robert Jennings	(Tonga)	2023	Rd. 7	Penrith Panthers	4	2	0	0	8
26	JJ Collins	(Australia) (Samoa)	2023	Rd. 7	Canberra Raiders	3	0	0	0	0
27	Valynce Te Whare	(New Zealand)	2023	Rd. 10	Debut	12	6	0	0	24
28	Max Plath	(Australia)	2023−	Rd. 14	Debut	40	9	0	0	36
29	Brayden McGrady	(Australia)	2023	Rd. 17	Debut	1	1	0	0	4
30	Josh Kerr	(Australia)	2023−25	Rd. 17	St. George Illawarra Dragons	48	3	0	0	12
31	Harrison Graham	(Australia)	2023−25	Rd. 17	Debut	11	2	0	0	8
32	Trai Fuller	(Australia)	2023−	Rd. 25	Debut	19	7	0	0	28
33	Herbie Farnworth	(England)	2024−	Rd. 1	Brisbane Broncos	49	25	0	0	100
34	Thomas Flegler	(Australia)	2024−	Rd. 1	Brisbane Broncos	13	1	0	0	4
35	Jake Averillo	(Australia)	2024−	Rd. 2	Canterbury Bulldogs	54	28	0	0	112
36	Lachlan Hubner	(Australia)	2024	Rd. 6	Debut	4	0	0	0	0
37	Oryn Keeley	(Australia)	2024−	Rd. 7	Newcastle Knights	26	5	0	0	20
38	Tevita Pangai Junior	(Tonga)	2024	Rd. 16	Canterbury Bulldogs	9	2	0	0	8
39	Junior Tupou	(Tonga)	2025	Rd. 1	West Tigers	2	0	0	0	0
40	Daniel Saifiti	(Australia) (Fiji)	2025−	Rd. 1	Newcastle Knights	8	2	0	0	8
41	Kulikefu Finefeuiaki	(Tonga)	2025−	Rd. 1	North Queensland Cowboys	31	4	0	0	16
42	Francis Molo	(Samoa)	2025−	Rd. 8	St. George Illawarra Dragons	23	1	0	0	4
43	Max Feagai	(New Zealand)	2025	Rd. 12	St. George Illawarra Dragons	8	1	0	0	4
44	Aublix Tawha	(New Zealand)	2025	Rd. 16	Debut	9	0	0	0	0
45	Tevita Naufahu	(New Zealand)	2025−	Rd. 19	Debut	9	7	0	0	28
46	Peter Hola	(Tonga) (Australia)	2025	Rd. 20	Canberra Raiders	2	0	0	0	0
47	Selwyn Cobbo	(Australia)	2026−	Rd. 1	Brisbane Broncos	10	6	0	0	24
48	Brad Schneider	(Australia)	2026−	Rd. 1	Penrith Panthers	7	1	0	0	4
49	Morgan Knowles	(United Kingdom)	2026−	Rd. 1	St Helens	10	1	0	0	4
50	Brent Woolf	(Australia)	2026−	Rd. 1	Debut	1	0	0	0	0
51	Lewis Symonds	(Australia)	2026−	Rd. 8	Debut	1	0	0	0	0
52	Brian Pouniu	(New Zealand)	2026−	Rd. 12	Debut	1	0	0	0	0
53	Sebastian Su'a	(New Zealand)	2026−	Rd. 18	Newcastle Knights	1	0	0	0	0
54	John Fineanganofo	(New Zealand)	2026−	Rd. 18	Debut	1	0	0	0	0
