= 2023 Dolphins (NRL) season =

2023 NRL rugby league season

- NRL Rank: 13th
- Play-off result: DNQ
- 2023 record: Wins: 9; losses: 15
- Points scored: For: 520; against: 631 (Rd 27)

Team information
- CEO: Terry Reader
- Head Coach: Wayne Bennett
- Captain: Jesse Bromwich (Rds 1–5, 7–9, 12–25, 27) Mark Nicholls (Round 6) Felise Kaufusi (Rds 10 & 26)
- Stadium: Suncorp Stadium; 52,500 (7 home games); Sunshine Coast Stadium; 12,000 (1 home game); Kayo Stadium; 11,500 (3 home games); Optus Stadium; 65,000 (1 home game – double-header)
- Avg. attendance: 22,919 (Round 27)
- High attendance: 51,047 (Round 4) Suncorp Stadium
- Low attendance: 5,130 (Round 22) Salter Oval

Top scorers
- Tries: Jamayne Isaako (24) (Round 27)
- Goals: Jamayne Isaako (73 + 2 FG) (Round 27)
- Points: Jamayne Isaako (244) (Round 27)
List of seasons	2024 →

The 2023 Dolphins season was the inaugural season for the Dolphins club in the National Rugby League (NRL) football competition in Australia. With Wayne Bennett as head coach and Jesse Bromwich as the regular team captain, the Dolphins competed in the 2023 NRL Telstra Premiership but did not qualify for the finals. Nevertheless, they finished in thirteenth place, ahead of four other established teams.

Dolphins goal-kicking winger Jamayne Isaako recorded both the highest number of NRL tries and points in the 2023 competition; a feat last achieved by Canberra Raiders goal-kicking centre Mal Meninga in 1990.

In Round 9, the Dolphins played their first golden point game but lost 30–31 to the Canberra Raiders at McDonalds Park, Wagga Wagga.

The NRL later conceded that match officials missed a crucial knock-on call late in Canberra's golden-point victory when the former regained possession after knocking the ball into the arm of a Dolphins player. "The NRL's head of football Graham Annesley said referee Peter Gough was obscured in his view of the knock on, but the sideline officials should have pulled the play up." Otherwise, Annesley advised that no policy changes could be considered until the current season is over.

In Round 13, an illegal try on the seventh tackle of a set was awarded to the St. George Illawarra Dragons in their 26–12 loss to the Dolphins at Kayo Stadium; the decision would not have been overturned even if the Dolphins had lost the game.

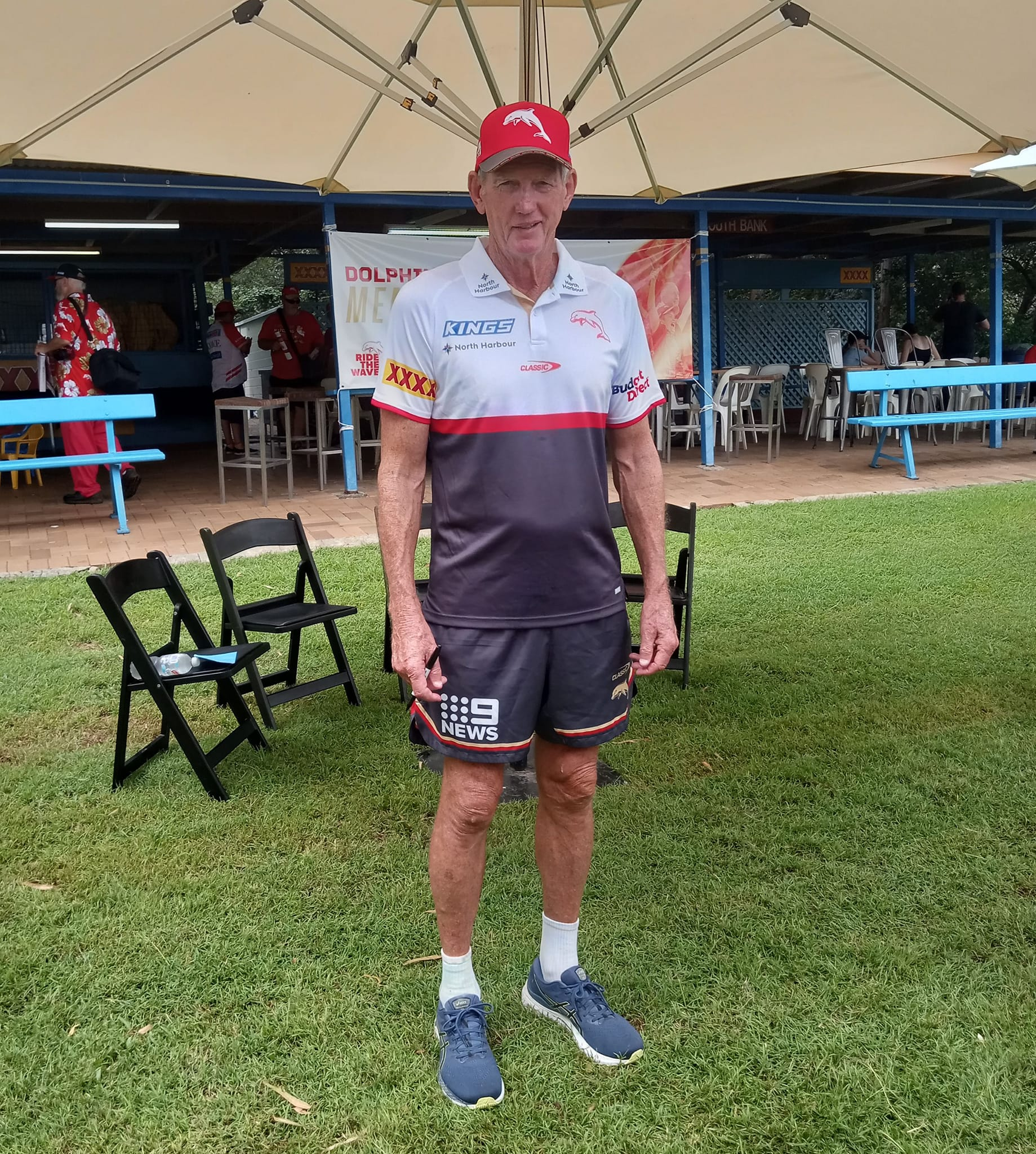
Dolphins NRL inaugural head coach Wayne Bennett

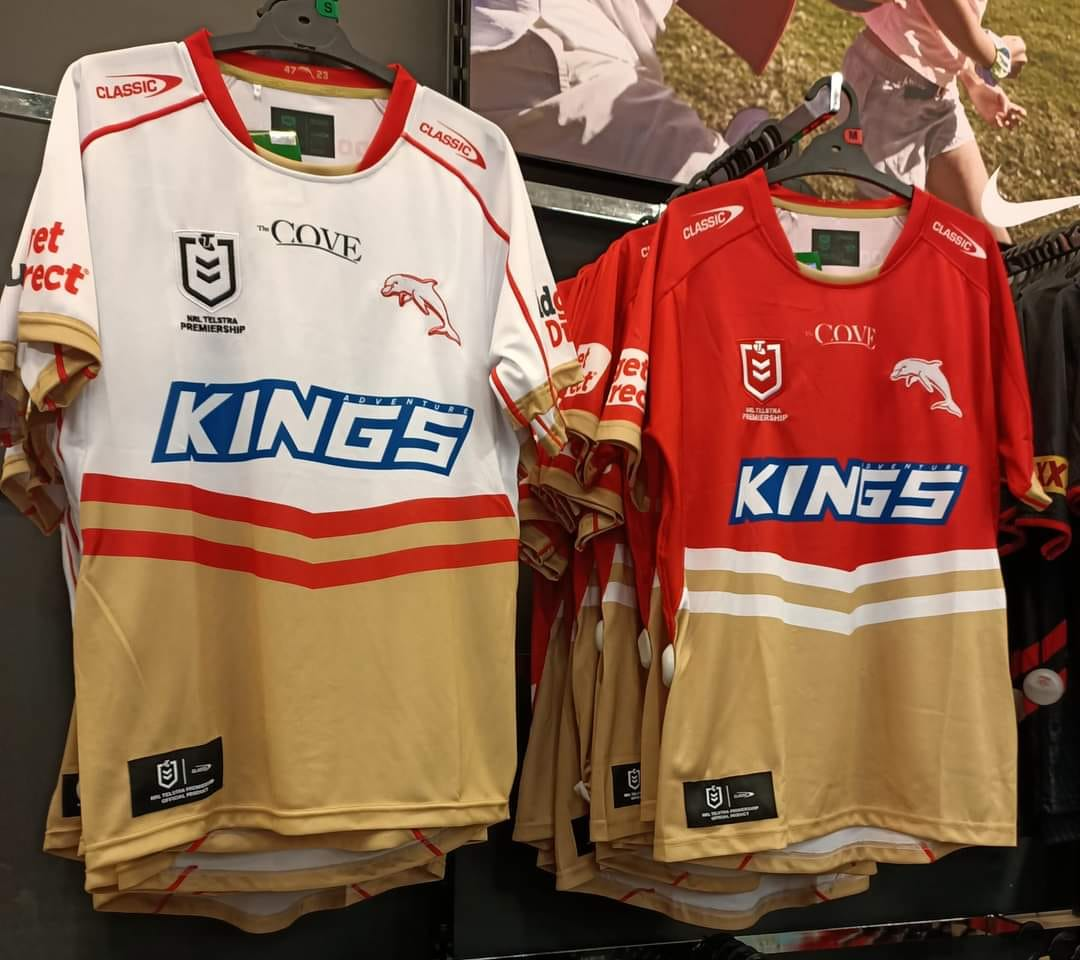
Dolphins NRL away and home jerseys 2023 (front view)

== 2023 Club awards ==
In September, the Dolphins' Inaugural Presentation Ball was held at Brisbane Convention and Exhibition Centre, and the club's annual awards were announced.

- Academic Award: Euan Aitken (for continued study in an MBA)
- Adventure Kings Fan-Voted MVP (Most Valuable Player): Hamiso Tabuai-Fidow
- Arthur Beetson Medal Player of the Year: Jamayne Isaako
- Best Back: Jamayne Isaako
- Best Forward: Mark Nicholls
- Club Person of the Year: Shane Morris (Dolphins' Game Development Manager)
- Most Consistent: Jamayne Isaako
- Players' Player: Jamayne Isaako
- Rookie of the Year: Isaiya Katoa

== Player movements ==
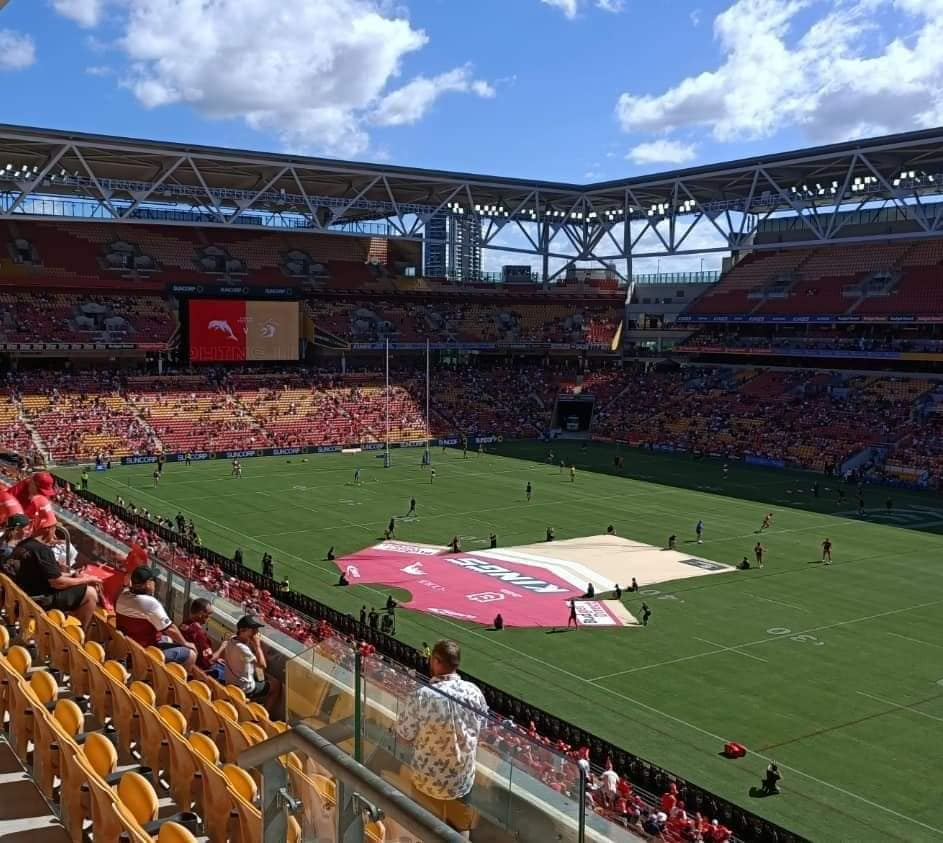
Dolphins NRL jersey on Suncorp Stadium field for inaugural match Sunday 5 March 2023

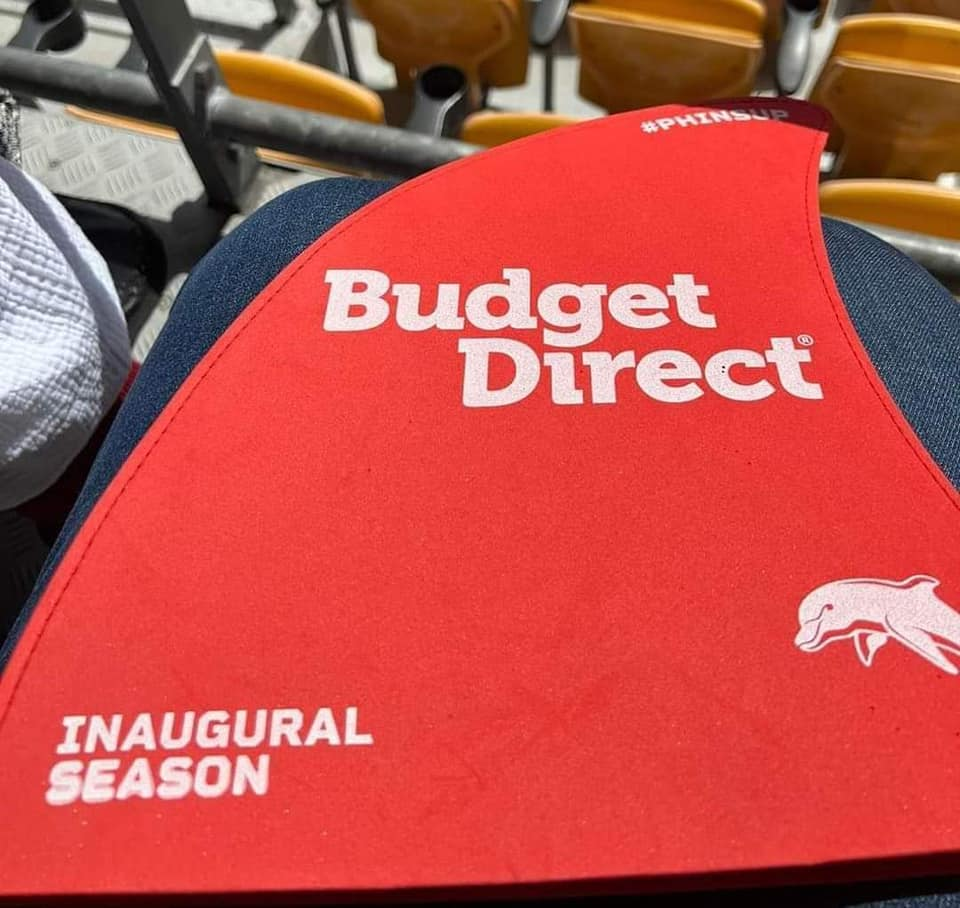
Dolphins supporters' fin headwear

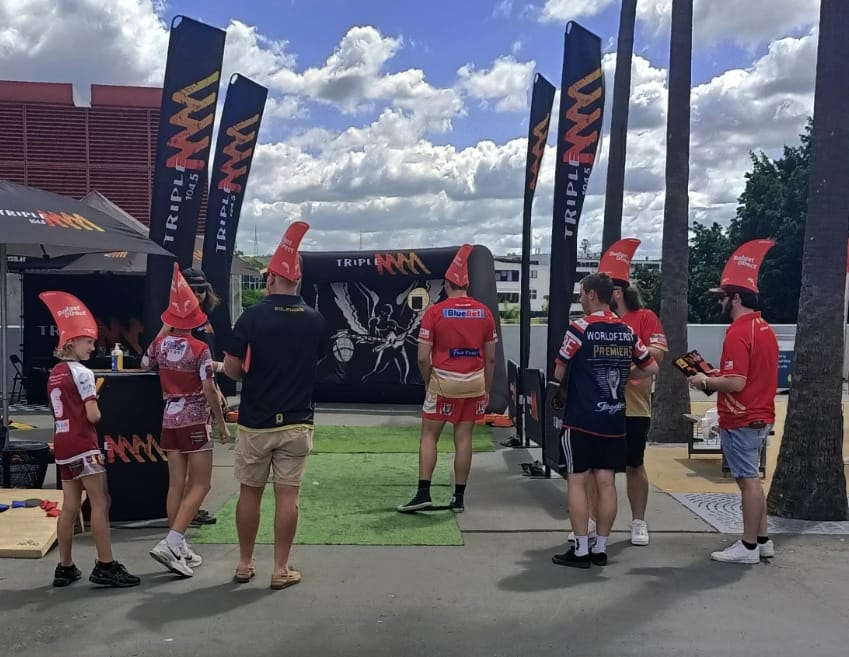
Emblematic dolphin fins on supporters' heads

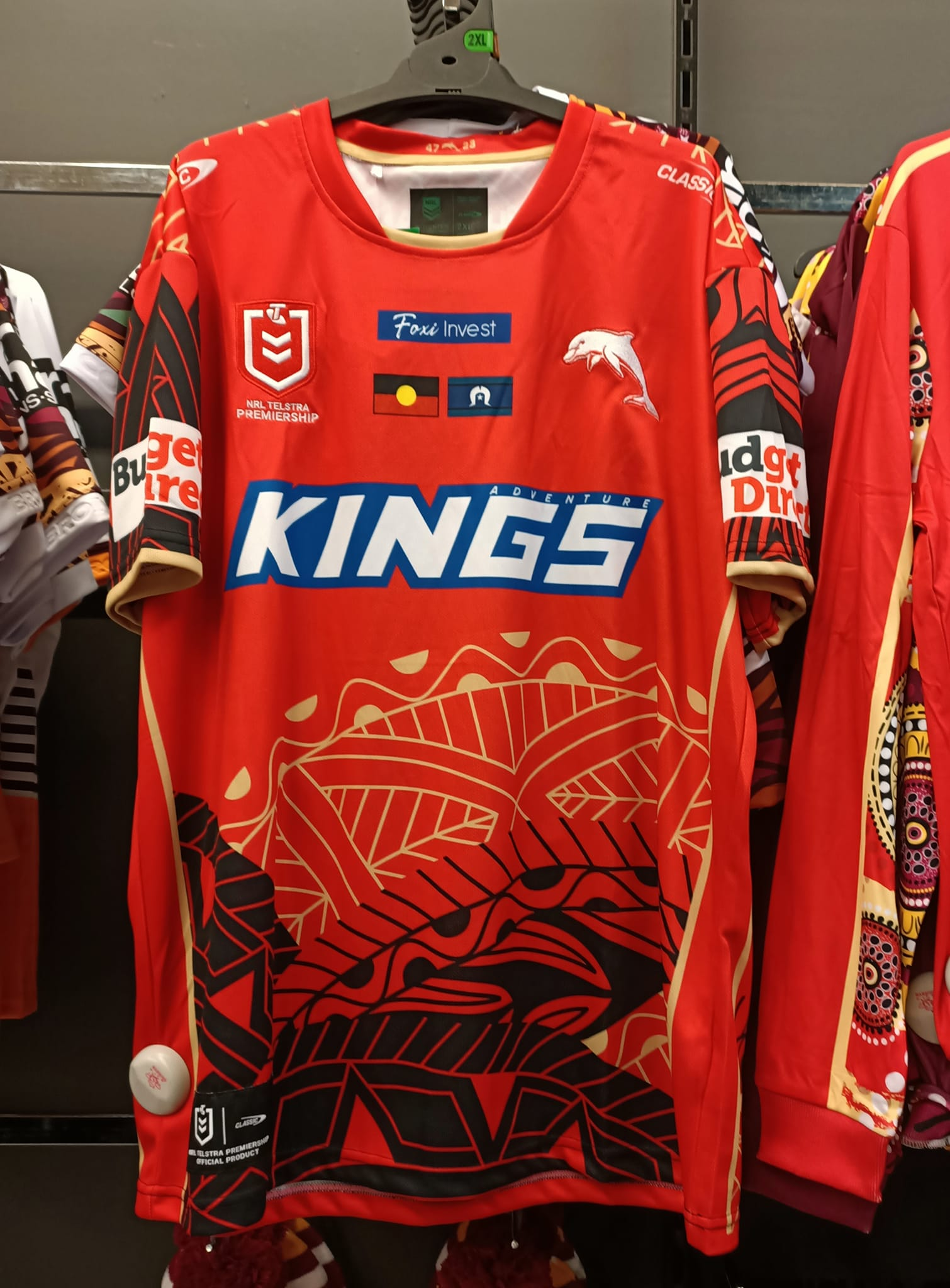
NRL Indigenous Round 12 Dolphins jersey 2023 (front view)

=== All 2023 signings ===
Player	Previous club	Length
Euan Aitken	New Zealand Warriors	2024
Brenton Baira	Mackay Cutters	2023
Tory Bath	Nudgee College	2024
Jack Bostock	St. George Illawarra Dragons	2025
Jesse Bromwich	Melbourne Storm	2024
Kenny Bromwich	Melbourne Storm	2025
Bailey Butler	CQ Capras	2024
JJ Collins	Tweed Heads Seagulls	2023
John-Paul Donevski	Penrith Panthers	2024
Kurt Donoghoe	Central Newcastle	2024
Herman Ese'ese	Gold Coast Titans	2023
Poasa Faamausili	St. George Illawarra Dragons	2023
Trai Fuller	Redcliffe Dolphins	2023
Tom Gilbert	North Queensland Cowboys	2023
Oliver Gildart	Wests Tigers	2023
Harrison Graham	Wynnum Manly Seagulls	2023
Lachlan Hubner	CQ Capras	2024
Cody Hunter	Redcliffe Dolphins	2023
Jamayne Isaako	Gold Coast Titans	2026
Ryan Jackson	Wynnum Manly Seagulls	2023
Robert Jennings	Penrith Panthers	2025
Isaiya Katoa	Penrith Panthers	2025
Felise Kaufusi	Melbourne Storm	2025
Josh Kerr	St George Illawarra Dragons	2025
Brenko Lee	Brisbane Broncos	2024
Edrick Lee	Newcastle Knights	2024
Connelly Lemuelu	North Queensland Cowboys	2025
Jeremy Marshall-King	Canterbury-Bankstown Bulldogs	2025
Brayden McGrady	Norths Devils	2024
Anthony Milford	Newcastle Knights	2024
Mark Nicholls	South Sydney Rabbitohs	2024
Kodi Nikorima	South Sydney Rabbitohs	2024
Tesi Niu	Brisbane Broncos	2024
Sean O'Sullivan	Penrith Panthers	2025
Max Plath	Wynnum Manly Seagulls	2025
Elijah Rasmussen	Westlake Boys High School	2023
Michael Roberts	Northern Rivers Titans	2023
Radean Robinson	CQ Capras	2024
Jeremiah Simbiken	Redcliffe Dolphins	2025
Ray Stone	Parramatta Eels	2024
Tyler Szepanowski	CQ Capras	2024
Hamiso Tabuai-Fidow	North Queensland Cowboys	2027
Mason Teague	Penrith Panthers	2024
Valynce Te Whare	King Country Rugby Football Union	2024
Setu Tu	Redcliffe Dolphins	2023
Jarrod Wallace	Gold Coast Titans	2024
Michael Waqa	Redcliffe Dolphins	2024

== Pre-season challenge ==
The 2023 NRL pre-season was played in February, before an eleven-day lead-up to the commencement of the regular 2023 NRL season.

Trial: 4 February 2023	Central Queensland Capras	8–24	Dolphins	Gladstone
19:00 AEST	Tries: Marshall 40'; Roberts 53'	[Report Report]	Tries: Graham 5'; Tu 13'; Baira 16'; Te Whare 21'; Tai 45'; Teague 67'	Stadium: Marley Brown Oval; Attendance: 4,500

Round 1: 12 February 2023	North Queensland Cowboys	22–22	Dolphins	Cairns
18:00 AEST	Tries: Moceidreke 11', 79'; Derby 17', 32'; Goals: Duffy 3/5 17', 27', 37', 51'; Laybutt 0/1	[Report Report]	Tries: Bostock 7'; Hubner 37'; Baira 53'; Teague 72'; Goals: Isaako 2/3 39', 55'; Katoa 1/1 74'	Stadium: Barlow Park; Attendance: 6,922; Referee: Ziggy Przeklasa-Adamski

Round 2: 19 February 2023	Dolphins	16–40	Gold Coast Titans	Redcliffe
19:05 AEST	Tries: Bostock 37'; Lemuelu 60'; Donoghoe 65'; Goals: O'Sullivan 1/1 39'; Isaako 1/2 66'; Sin bin: Kaufusi (yellow card) 44' to 54'	[Report Report]	Tries: Khan-Pereira 3', 9', 11', 68'; Hutchison 17', 24'; Schoupp 44'; McIntyre 56'; Goals: Boyd 4/8 13', 19', 46', 58'; Campbell 0/1	Stadium: Kayo Stadium; Attendance: 7,216; Referee: Adam Gee

== Regular season ==
=== League table ===
For the 2023 NRL season, the number of teams increased from sixteen to seventeen with the inclusion of the Dolphins, a fourth Queensland-based club, playing most of their home games at Suncorp Stadium in Brisbane.

2023 NRL season
Pos	Team	Pld	W	D	L	B	PF	PA	PD	Pts
1	Penrith Panthers (P)	24	18	0	6	3	645	312	+333	42
2	Brisbane Broncos	24	18	0	6	3	639	425	+214	42
3	Melbourne Storm	24	16	0	8	3	627	459	+168	38
4	New Zealand Warriors	24	16	0	8	3	572	448	+124	38
5	Newcastle Knights	24	14	1	9	3	626	451	+175	35
6	Cronulla-Sutherland Sharks	24	14	0	10	3	619	497	+122	34
7	Sydney Roosters	24	13	0	11	3	472	496	−24	32
8	Canberra Raiders	24	13	0	11	3	486	623	−137	32
9	South Sydney Rabbitohs	24	12	0	12	3	564	505	+59	30
10	Parramatta Eels	24	12	0	12	3	587	574	+13	30
11	North Queensland Cowboys	24	12	0	12	3	546	542	+4	30
12	Manly Warringah Sea Eagles	24	11	1	12	3	545	539	+6	29
13	Dolphins	24	9	0	15	3	520	631	−111	24
14	Gold Coast Titans	24	9	0	15	3	527	653	−126	24
15	Canterbury-Bankstown Bulldogs	24	7	0	17	3	438	769	−331	20
16	St. George Illawarra Dragons	24	5	0	19	3	474	673	−199	16
17	Wests Tigers	24	4	0	20	3	385	675	−290	14

=== Result by round ===
Round	1	2	3	4	5	6	7	8	9	10	11	12	13	14	15	16	17	18	19	20	21	22	23	24	25	26	27
Ground	H	H	A	H	A	A	H	H	A	N	–	H	H	A	A	–	H	A	A	H	–	A	H	A	A	H	H
Result	W	W	W	L	L	W	L	W	L	W	B	L	W	L	L	B	L	L	W	L	B	L	L	L	L	L	W
Position	3	2	2	3	7	4	8	8	9	5	8	6	6	8	11	10	11	12	12	13	13	13	14	14	14	14	13
Points	2	4	6	6	6	8	8	10	10	12	14	14	16	16	16	18	18	18	20	20	22	22	22	22	22	22	24

Source: National Rugby League
A = Away; H = Home; N = Neutral; B = Bye; W = Win; D = Draw; L = Loss

=== Matches ===
In 2023, the Dolphins played seven of their twelve home games at the 52,500-capacity Suncorp Stadium in Brisbane, one at Sunshine Coast Stadium and the three other at Kayo Stadium in Redcliffe, which also served as a training and administration base. Optus Stadium in Perth also hosted one home game. This occurred in Round 23 against the Newcastle Knights during a double-header with the other game being between South Sydney Rabbitohs and Cronulla-Sutherland Sharks.

Round 1: 5 March 2023	Dolphins	28–18	Sydney Roosters	Brisbane
20:05 AEST	Tries: Tabuai-Fidow 15'; Nicholls 35'; Lemuelu 46'; Isaako 50', 56'; Goals: Isaako 4/5 17', 27', 37', 51'	[Report Report]	Tries: Sua'ali'i 10'; Hutchison 18'; Tupou 66'; Goals: Walker 3/3 12', 19', 67'; Sin bin: Butcher (yellow card) 62' to 72'	Stadium: Suncorp Stadium; Attendance: 32,177; Referee: Chris Butler

Round 2: 11 March 2023	Dolphins	20–14	Canberra Raiders	Redcliffe
16:30 AEST	Tries: Tabuai-Fidow 38', 77'; Gilbert 62'; Goals: Isaako 3/3 39', 64', 78'; Sin bin: Marshall-King (yellow card) 33' to 43'; O'Sullivan (yellow card) 73' to 80'	[Report Report]	Tries: Wighton 13'; Cotric 28'; Goals: Fogarty 1/2 30'; Sin bin: Young (yellow card) 69' to 79'	Stadium: Kayo Stadium; Attendance: 10,023; Referee: Todd Smith

Round 3: 17 March 2023	Newcastle Knights	20–36	Dolphins	Newcastle
18:00 AEDT	Tries: Gamble 18'; Miller 35', 45'; Goals: Hastings 3/3 19', 37', 46'; Miller 1/1 69 (pen)'	[Report Report]	Tries: Tabuai-Fidow 38', 77'; Gilbert 62'; Goals: Isaako 3/3 39', 64', 78'; Sin bin: Kaufusi (yellow card) 68' to 78'	Stadium: McDonald Jones Stadium; Attendance: 20,093; Referee: Chris Butler

Round 4: 24 March 2023	Dolphins	12–18	Brisbane Broncos	Brisbane
19:00 AEST	Tries: Wallace 56'; Tabuai-Fidow 62'; Goals: Isaako 2/2 57', 64'	[Report Report]	Tries: Arthars 22'; Cobbo 49'; Capewell 69'; Staggs 77'; Goals: Reynolds 1/4 71'	Stadium: Suncorp Stadium; Attendance: 51,047; Referee: Adam Gee

Round 5: 1 April 2023	St. George Illawarra Dragons	38–12	Dolphins	Wollongong
17:30 AEDT	Tries: Liddle 18'; Lawrie 26'; Lomax 41'; Hunt 53'; Ravalawa 61', 67'; Sloan 74'; Goals: Lomax 5/7 19', 27', 54', 63', 76'	[Report Report]	Tries: Isaako 13'; Tabuai-Fidow 71'; Goals: Isaako 2/3 14', 38 (pen)' Sin bin: Nicholls (yellow card) 66' to 76'	Stadium: WIN Stadium; Attendance: 20,093; Referee: Chris Butler

Round 6: 7 April 2023	North Queensland Cowboys	22–32	Dolphins	Townsville
20:00 AEST	Tries: Feldt 16', 38'; Hess 51'; Holmes 68'; Goals: Holmes 3/4 18', 39', 52'; Sin bin: Hess (yellow card) 26' to 36'; Elliot (yellow card) 74' to 80'	[Report Report]	Tries: Isaako 7', 13', 30'; Tabuai-Fidow 23', 78'; Gilbert 33'; Goals: Isaako 4/7 24', 31', 35', 75 (pen)' Sin bin: Nikorima (yellow card) 37' to 47'	Stadium: Queensland Country Bank Stadium; Attendance: 22,811; Referee: Adam Gee

Round 7: 13 April 2023	Dolphins	14–36	South Sydney Rabbitohs	Brisbane
19:50 AEST	Tries: Wallace 1'; Marshall-King 33'; Goals: Isaako 3/3 3', 28 pen', 35'; Sin bin: K. Bromwich (yellow card) 60' to 70'	[Report Report]	Tries: Arthars 22', 44'; Walker 48'; Tass 62'; Mitchell 64'; Johnston 67'; Goals: Mitchell 6/7 23', 46', 50', 58 (pen)', 63', 65'	Stadium: Suncorp Stadium; Attendance: 23,280; Referee: Ashley Klein

Round 8: 23 April 2023	Dolphins	28–26	Gold Coast Titans	Brisbane
14:00 AEST	Tries: Jennings 33', 64'; Nicholls 47'; Wallace 50'; Aitken 74'; Goals: Isaako 4/5 34', 49', 51', 66'	[Report Report]	Tries: Randall 14'; Liu 18'; Fa'asuamaleaui 20'; Boyd 26'; Goals: Boyd 5/5 8 pen', 16', 19', 22', 28'	Stadium: Suncorp Stadium; Attendance: 22,034; Referee: Chris Butler

Round 9: 29 April 2023	Canberra Raiders	31–30	Dolphins	Wagga Wagga
15:00 AEST	Tries: Croker 1'; Wighton 5'; Rapana 20'; Kris 35'; Fogarty 66'; Goals: Croker 5/7 7', 17 (pen)', 22', 48 pen', 67'; Field goals: Fogarty 83'	[Report Report]	Tries: Aitken 25'; Tabuai-Fidow 30'; Lemuelu 57', 61'; Bromwich 71'; Goals: Isaako 5/5 27', 31', 58', 62', 72'	Stadium: McDonald's Park; Attendance: 10,445; Referee: Peter Gough

Round 10: 6 May 2023	Cronulla-Sutherland Sharks	16–36	Dolphins	Brisbane
17:30 AEST	Tries: Mulitalo 36'; Kennedy 38'; Wilton 66'; Goals: Hynes 2/3 39', 67'	[Report Report]	Tries: Katoa 5'; Tabuai-Fidow 16'; Te Whare 22', 51'; Lemuelu 26'; Niu 31'; Goals: Isaako 6/6 7', 18', 23', 28', 33', 53'	Stadium: Suncorp Stadium; Attendance: 50,183; Referee: Grant Atkins

Round 11 (Bye for Dolphins)

Round 12: 20 May 2023	Dolphins	16–24	Melbourne Storm	Brisbane
19:35 AEST	Tries: Isaako 12', 65'; Nikorima 73'; Goals: Isaako 2/3 67', 74'; Sin bin: Kaufusi (yellow card) 1' to 11'	[Report Report]	Tries: Warbrick 6'; Munster 16'; Katoa 31'; Smith 35'; Goals: Meaney 4/4 8', 18', 32', 36'	Stadium: Suncorp Stadium; Attendance: 28,325; Referee: Grant Atkins

Round 13: 25 May 2023	Dolphins	26–12	St. George Illawarra Dragons	Redcliffe
19:50 AEST	Tries: Isaako 21', 49'; Nicholls 24'; Wallace 27'; Goals: Isaako 5/5 23', 26', 29', 51', 76 (pen)'	[Report Report]	Tries: Bird 5'; Couchman 39'; Goals: Lomax 2/3 4 pen', 40'; Sin bin: De Belin (yellow card) 27' to 37'	Stadium: Kayo Stadium; Attendance: 10,047; Referee: Adam Gee

Round 14: 3 June 2023	New Zealand Warriors	30–8	Dolphins	Auckland
17:00 NZST	Tries: Johnson 5', 53'; Metcalf 55'; Watene-Zelezniak 68', 71'; Goals: Johnson 5/5 67', 74'	[Report Report]	Tries: Niu 34'; Isaako 76'; Goals: Isaako 0/2; Sin bin: Milford (yellow card) 47' to 57'	Stadium: Go Media Stadium; Attendance: 23,686; Referee: Grant Atkins

Round 15: 9 June 2023	Manly Warringah Sea Eagles	58–18	Dolphins	Sydney
20:00 AEST	Tries: Saab 3', 69'; Garrick 7', 30', 74'; Trbojevic 12', 45'; Croker 15'; Koula 50', 67'; Goals: Garrick 9/10 9', 13', 16', 32', 47', 51', 69', 71', 76'	[Report Report]	Tries: Isaako 22'; Tabuai-Fidow 57', 79'; Goals: Isaako 3/3 24', 58', 80'	Stadium: 4 Pines Park; Attendance: 28,325; Referee: Grant Atkins

Round 16 (Bye for Dolphins)

Round 17: 24 June 2023	Dolphins	20–48	Parramatta Eels	Sunshine Coast
15:00 AEST	Tries: McGrady 3'; Tabuai-Fidow 49', 66'; Te Whare 55'; Goals: Isaako 2/4 50', 67'	[Report Report]	Tries: Davey 6'; Hopgood 11'; Penisini 20', 25'; Gutherson 23', 63'; Simonsson 31'; Russell 38'; Goals: Moses 8/8 8', 18', 32', 36'	Stadium: Sunshine Coast Stadium; Attendance: 8,821; Referee: Peter Gough

Round 18: 20 May 2023	Brisbane Broncos	24–16	Dolphins	Brisbane
19:35 AEST	Tries: Cobbo 7', 68', 77'; Farnworth 21', 27'; Goals: Reynolds 2/5 23', 70'	[Report Report]	Tries: Nikorima 25'; Te Whare 50'; Marshall-King 63'; Goals: Isaako 2/3 26', 64'	Stadium: The Gabba; Attendance: 30,606; Referee: Peter Gough

Round 19: 9 July 2023	Gold Coast Titans	21–23	Dolphins	Gold Coast
16:05 AEST	Tries: Foran 27'; Sami 31'; Kelly 65'; Goals: Boyd 4/4 28', 32', 38 (pen)', 67'; Field goals: Boyd 78'	[Report Report]	Tries: Lemuelu 16'; Wallace 47'; K. Bromwich 58'; Isaako 61'; Goals: Isaako 3/5 17', 49', 85 (pen)' Field goals: Isaako 74'	Stadium: Cbus Super Stadium; Attendance: 18,335; Referee: Grant Atkins

Round 20: 16 July 2023	Dolphins	14–24	Penrith Panthers	Redcliffe
16:05 AEST	Tries: Nikorima 32'; Lemuelu 51'; Tabuai-Fidow 55'; Goals: Isaako 1/3 53'	[Report Report]	Tries: Leota 4'; Tago 8', 16'; Jenkins 68', 77'; Goals: Edwards 2/5 69', 78'; Sin bin: Cogger (yellow card) 32' to 42'	Stadium: Kayo Stadium; Attendance: 10,065; Referee: Todd Smith

Round 21 (Bye for Dolphins)

Round 22: 30 July 2023	Canterbury-Bankstown Bulldogs	23–22	Dolphins	Bundaberg
14:00 AEST	Tries: Kikau 25'; Burns 31'; Averillo 52'; Wilson 69'; Goals: Burton 3/4 20', 54', 70'; Field goals: Burton 39'	[Report Report]	Tries: Isaako 16'; Milford 56', 78'; Te Whare 64'; Goals: Isaako 3/4 9 pen', 17', 57'	Stadium: Salter Oval; Attendance: 5,130; Referee: Peter Gough

Round 23: 5 August 2023	Dolphins	28–30	Newcastle Knights	Perth
15:30 AWST	Tries: Isaako 12', 65'; Nikorima 73'; Goals: O'Sullivan 2/2 33', 50'; Isaako 2/4 42 (pen)', 74'	[Report Report]	Tries: Ponga 11'; Mann 35'; Hastings 53'; Crossland 58'; Marzhew 69'; Goals: Ponga 5/5 12', 36', 54', 59', 71'; Sin bin: Fitzgibbon (yellow card) 22' to 32'	Stadium: Optus Stadium; Attendance: 42,042; Referee: Grant Atkins

Round 24: 12 August 2023	Sydney Roosters	30–14	Dolphins	Sydney
19:35 AEST	Tries: Manu 39'; Smith 43'; Sua'ali'i 51'; Hutchison 55', 64'; Goals: Sua'ali'i 5/5 39', 45', 52', 56', 66'	[Report Report]	Tries: Stone 23'; Isaako 74'; Goals: Isaako 3/3 25', 35 (pen)', 76'; Sin bin: Stone (yellow card) 47' to 57'	Stadium: Allianz Stadium; Attendance: 13,704; Referee: Todd Smith

Round 25: 19 August 2023	Wests Tigers	24–23	Dolphins	Sydney
15:00 AEST	Tries: Pole 13'; Kepaoa 22'; Seyfarth 53'; Simpkin 56'; Goals: Koroisau 4/5 15', 24', 58', 76 (pen)'	[Report Report]	Tries: Isaako 17'; Aitken 26'; Bostock 43'; Fuller 62'; Goals: Isaako 3/5 18', 64', 67 (pen)' Field goals: Isaako 74'	Stadium: CommBank Stadium; Attendance: 9,245; Referee: Ben Cummins

Round 26: 25 August 2023	Dolphins	10–34	North Queensland Cowboys	Brisbane
20:00 AEST	Tries: Isaako 62', 71'; Goals: Isaako 1/2 63'; Sin bin: Kerr (yellow card) 27' to 37'	[Report Report]	Tries: Laybutt 10', 34'; Feldt 14'; Drinkwater 16'; Taulagi 55'; Hiku 65'; Goals: Drinkwater 5/6 11', 16', 18', 35', 67'	Stadium: Suncorp Stadium; Attendance: 33,449; Referee: Gerard Sutton

Round 27: 2 September 2023	Dolphins	34–10	New Zealand Warriors	Brisbane
15:00 AEST	Tries: Bostock 7'; O'Sullivan 23'; Katoa 25'; Isaako 39'; Plath 65'; K. Bromwich 78'; Goals: Isaako 5/6 9', 24', 27', 67', 79'	[Report Report]	Tries: Lussick 57'; Montoya 59'; Goals: Pompey 1/2 59'	Stadium: Suncorp Stadium; Attendance: 35,438; Referee: Gerard Sutton

== 2023 Squad ==
Dolphins 2023 Squad
Top 30 squad – 2023 NRL season			Development players	Coaching staff
Euan Aitken – CE, SR; Jack Bostock – WG; Jesse Bromwich (c) – PR; Kenny Bromwich – SR, PR, LK; JJ Collins – PR; Kurt Donoghoe – HK; Herman Ese'ese – PR; Poasa Faamausili – PR; Tom Gilbert – LK; Jamayne Isaako – WG	Robert Jennings – WG, CE; Isaiya Katoa – HB, FE; Felise Kaufusi – SR; Josh Kerr – PR; Brenko Lee – CE; Edrick Lee – WG; Connelly Lemuelu – SR; Jeremy Marshall-King – HK; Anthony Milford – FE, HB; Mark Nicholls – PR, LK	Kodi Nikorima – FE, FB, CE; Tesi Niu – WG, CE; Max Plath – LK, FE; Sean O'Sullivan – HB; Ray Stone – LK, PR, HK; Hamiso Tabuai-Fidow – FB, CE; Mason Teague – HK; Valynce Te Whare – CE, WG; Jarrod Wallace – PR	Harrison Graham – HK; Ryan Jackson – PR; Michael Roberts – FE, CE; Jeremiah Simbiken – SR; Michael Waqa – PR; Extended squad: Trai Fuller – FB; Brayden McGrady – WG	Head coach: Wayne Bennett; Assistant coaches: Nathan Fien; Kristian Woolf; Jeremy Hickmans (Head of Performance); Blake Duncan (Athletic Performance Coach); Elliot Jackson (Athletic Performance Coach); Medical professionals: Sam Madden (Head Physiotherapist); Adam Schumacher (Physiotherapist); John Davey (Head of Sports Science & Performance Analysis); Dr Peter Hackney (Doctor); Dr Brendan Thompson (Doctor); Legend: (c) Captain(s); (vc) Vice-captain(s); Development players; Extended squad; Updated: 14 March 2023; Source(s): NRL,
