= 2023 Dolphins season =

2023 Dolphins season may refer to:

- 2023 Dolphins (NRL) season
- 2023 Miami Dolphins season
