= Tesi Niu =

Tonga international rugby league footballer

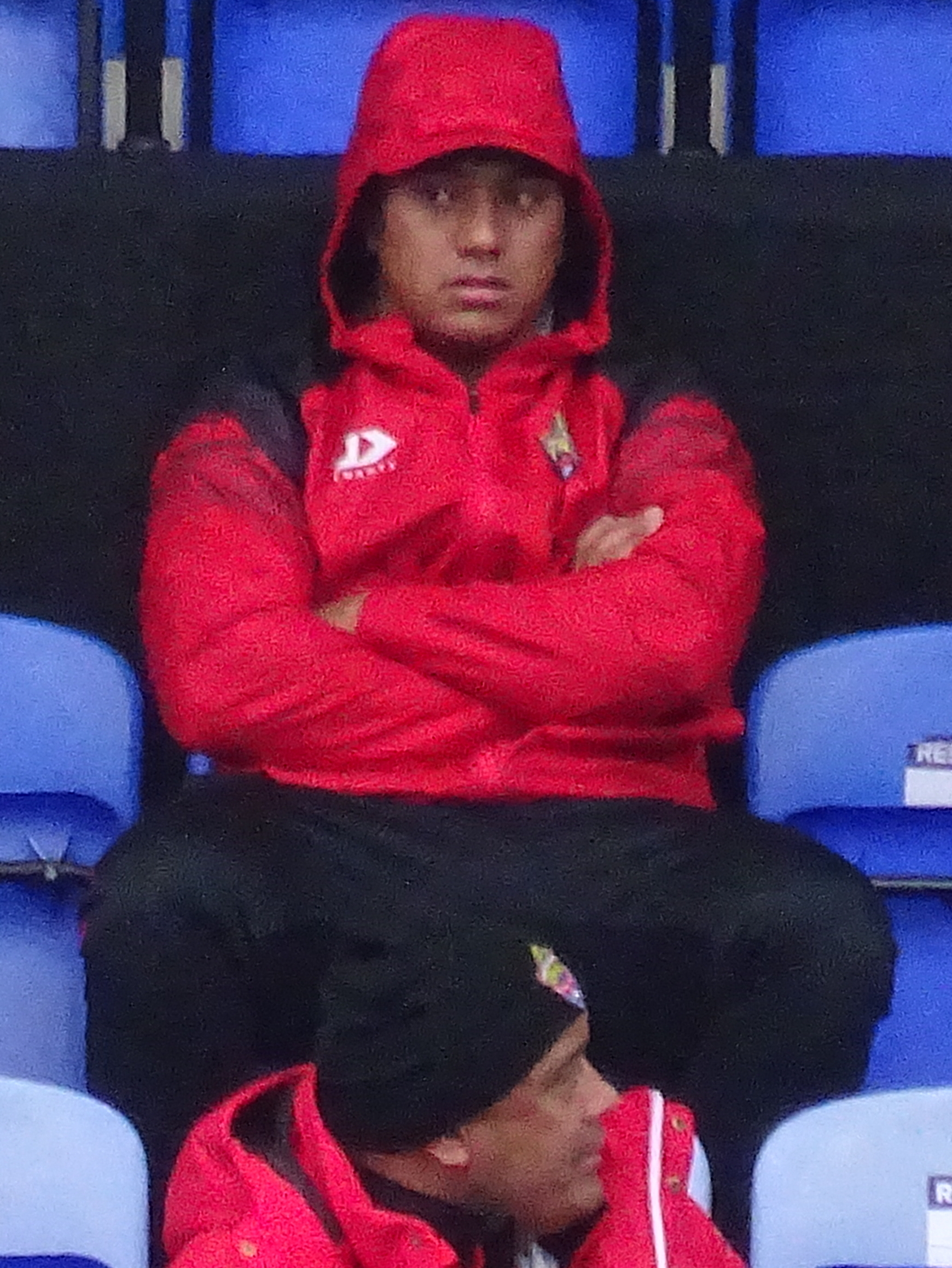

Personal information
- Full name: Fanitesi Niu
- Born: 11 August 2001 (age 25) Brisbane, Queensland, Australia
- Height: 5 ft 10 in (1.77 m)
- Weight: 14 st 11 lb (94 kg)

Playing information
- Position: Fullback, Wing, Centre
Club
Years	Team	Pld	T	G	FG	P
2020–22	Brisbane Broncos	32	11	0	0	44
2023–24	Dolphins	24	9	0	0	36
2025–	Leigh Leopards	43	16	0	0	64
	Total	99	36	0	0	144
Representative
Years	Team	Pld	T	G	FG	P
2019	Tonga 9s	3	1	0	0	4
2019–22	Tonga	3	4	0	0	16
- Source: As of 30 August 2025
- Relatives: David Fifita (cousin)

Fanitesi Niu (born 11 August 2001) is a Tonga international rugby league footballer who plays as a centre or winger for the Leigh Leopards in the Super League.

He previously played for the Dolphins and the Brisbane Broncos in the NRL.

== Background ==
Niu was born on 11 August 2001 in Brisbane, Queensland, Australia. He was educated at Marsden State High School and played his junior rugby league for the Forest Lake Magpies. He is a first cousin of David Fifita.

Niu also represented the 2018 Australian Schoolboys.

== Playing career ==
=== 2019 ===
Niu represented Tonga in 2019 Great Britain Lions tour making his international debut. He then played for Tonga 9s in the 2019 Rugby League World Cup 9s.

=== Brisbane Broncos (2020–2022) ===
On 4 June 2020, Niu made his NRL debut for the Brisbane Broncos, coming off the interchange bench in a record 59–0 home defeat against the Sydney Roosters. On 27 June 2020, he made his starting debut at fullback against the Gold Coast Titans.

Niu made a total of six appearances for Brisbane in the 2020 NRL season after suffering a season-ending wrist injury in round 10, as the club finished last on the table and claimed its first-ever wooden spoon.

In round 16 of the 2021 NRL season, Niu scored two tries in a 26–18 victory over Cronulla-Sutherland.

Niu played a total of ten games for Brisbane in the 2022 NRL season scoring three tries as the club finished 9th on the table and missed out on the finals. In the third group game at the 2021 Rugby League World Cup, Niu scored a hat-trick for Tonga in their 92–10 victory over the Cook Islands at the Riverside Stadium.

=== Dolphins (2023–24) ===
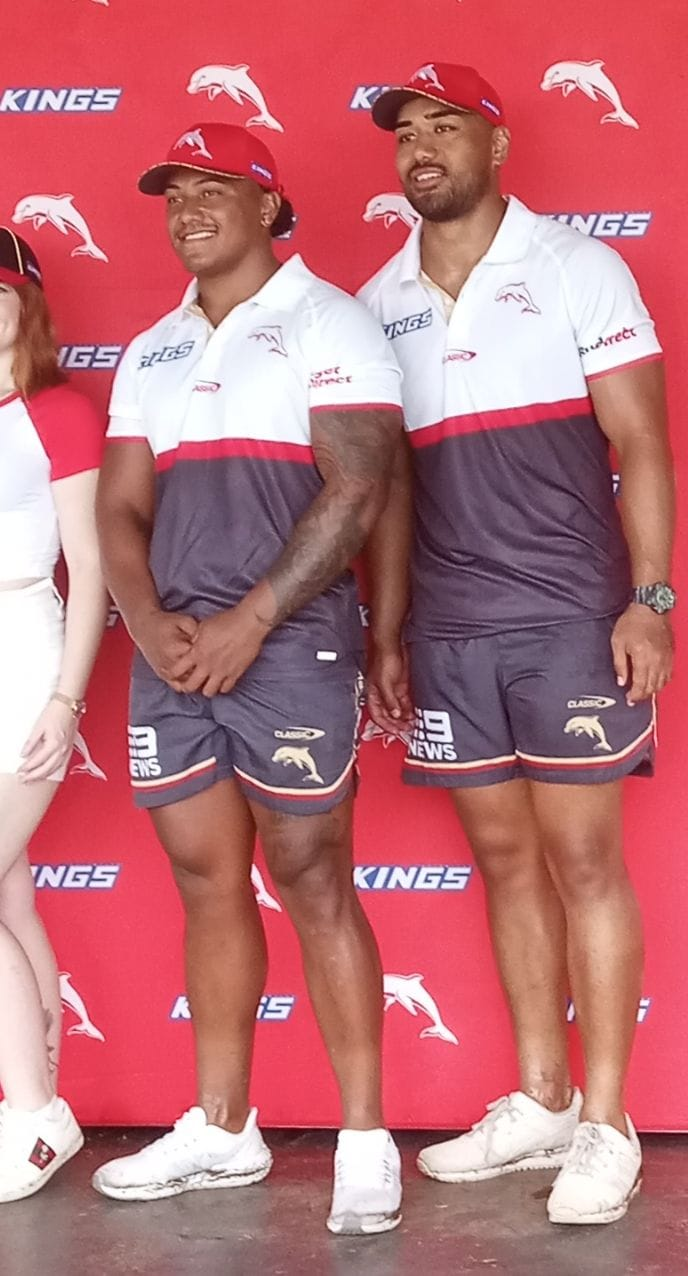
Niu (left) and Connelly Lemuelu in 2024

Niu joined the newly-licensed Dolphins after he was granted an early release by Brisbane. In round 1 of the 2023 NRL season, Niu made his club debut for the Dolphins in their inaugural game in the national competition, defeating the Sydney Roosters 28–18 at Suncorp Stadium. In round 3 of the 2023 NRL season, he became the first player in the Dolphins NRL history to score a hat-trick when they defeated the Newcastle Knights 36–20. In total, Niu played seventeen games and scored five tries for the Dolphins in 2023. His contract was extended until the end of 2024.

=== 2024 ===
In round 7 of the 2024 NRL season, Niu scored two tries in the Dolphins 44–16 victory over Parramatta. Following the end of the 2024 NRL season Niu turned out for feeder club Norths Devils and won the Queensland Cup with a 34-20 grand final victory over the Redcliffe Dolphins. Niu scored a double in the decider to earn the Duncan Hall medal for man of the match. Two weeks later he also helped the Devils win the NRL State Championship against NSW Cup premiers the Newtown Jets. Niu confirmed that he would move to the Leigh Leopards at the start of the 2025 season.

=== 2025 ===
Niu made his club debut for Leigh in round 1 of the 2025 Super League season against rivals Wigan. Leigh would win the match 1-0 in extra-time after the game finished 0-0 at the conclusion of 80 minutes. Niu played 26 games for Leigh in the 2025 Super League season including their semi-final loss against arch-rivals Wigan.

== See also ==
- List of Dolphins (NRL) players
