= Mason Teague =

Cook Islands international rugby league footballer

Personal information
- Full name: Mason Anthony Teague
- Born: 13 July 2003 (age 23) Sydney, New South Wales, Australia
- Height: 179 cm (5 ft 10 in)
- Weight: 93 kg (14 st 9 lb)

Playing information
- Position: Hooker, Lock
Club
Years	Team	Pld	T	G	FG	P
2023–25	Dolphins	8	0	0	0	0
2027–	Wakefield Trinity	0	0	0	0	0
	Total	8	0	0	0	0
Representative
Years	Team	Pld	T	G	FG	P
2024–	Cook Islands	8	1	0	0	4
- Source: As of 31 October 2026

Mason Teague (born 13 July 2003) is a Cook Islands international rugby league footballer who plays as a lock or second-row forward for Wakefield Trinity in the Super League.

He previously played for the Dolphins in the NRL.

== Background ==
Teague was born in Sydney, New South Wales and is of Fijian and Cook Island descent. He attended St Dominic's College, Penrith. He was playing in Penrith Panthers’ under-19s team in NSW Rugby League’s S. G. Ball Cup competition when he was signed by the Dolphins on a three-year deal.

== Playing career ==
=== Club career ===
Teague was contracted to the Penrith Panthers as a junior coming through the ranks, before signing with the Dolphins for their inaugural 2023 NRL season.

=== Dolphins (2023−24) ===
In round 2 of the 2023 NRL season, Teague made his first grade debut for the Dolphins in place of the injured Ray Stone in his side's 20−14 victory over the Canberra Raiders at Dolphin Stadium.

In 2024 Teague won the Queensland Cup starting at lock for the Norths Devils in the grand final against the Redcliffe Dolphins. Two weeks later he also played in their NRL State Championship win over NSW Cup premiers the Newtown Jets.

=== 2025 ===
On 13 April, Teague was released from the Dolphins in a swap deal with Newcastle.

=== 2026 ===
On 28 July 2026 it was reported that he had signed for Wakefield Trinity in the Super League on a 2-year deal.

== Statistics ==
Year	Team	Games	Tries	Pts
2023	Dolphins	7	0	0
2024	Dolphins	1	0	0
2025	Newcastle Knights	0	0	0
2027	Wakefield Trinity	0	0	0
	Totals	8	0	0
