= Valynce Te Whare =

New Zealand rugby league & union player

Personal information
- Full name: Valynce Mikaeri Crosby Te Whare
- Born: 15 September 2000 (age 25) Waikato, New Zealand
- Height: 182 cm (6 ft 0 in)
- Weight: 107 kg (16 st 12 lb)

Playing information

Rugby union
- Position: Wing
Representative
Years	Team	Pld	T	G	FG	P
2019–20	Waikato	8	4	0	0	20
2021	King Country	2	2	0	0	10
2024–	Shizuoka Blue Revs	19	10	0	0	50

Rugby league
- Position: Centre, Lock
Club
Years	Team	Pld	T	G	FG	P
2023	Dolphins	12	6	0	0	24
- As of 08 March 2025

Valynce Te Whare (/təfɑːreɪ/) (born 15 September 2000) is a New Zealand rugby league and union footballer, who plays for the Shizuoka Blue Revs in Japan. He previously played in the National Rugby League (NRL) in Australia for the Dolphins.

== Background ==
Te Whare was born and raised in Waikato, New Zealand, and is of Māori descent.

== Playing career ==
=== Rugby union ===
Te Whare played rugby union in New Zealand for his junior club, Fraser Tech. In 2019, he was selected for the Waikato Rugby Union team. From 2019 to 2020, Te Whare played wing for Waikato, scoring four tries in eight games. In 2021, Te Whare played two games for King Country Rugby Football Union and scored two tries.

=== Rugby league ===
In December 2021, Te Whare signed a rugby league contract with newly-licensed NRL side the Dolphins in Australia, who commenced their inaugural National Rugby League season in 2023.

In the meantime and to familiarise himself with the football code switch, Te Whare played for the Redcliffe Dolphins in the Hostplus Cup (QRL) state rugby league competition in Queensland, Australia during their 2022 season. On 4 June, he made his rugby league debut as a centre and scored two tries for the Redcliffe Dolphins in their 54–0 victory over the Ipswich Jets. In total, Te Whare played fourteen games and scored twelve tries during 2022.[]

On 23 September at the Queensland Rugby League Awards in Brisbane, Te Whare was named the 2022 Hostplus Cup competition’s Centre of the Year.

=== Dolphins (2023) ===
Te Whare continued playing for the Redcliffe Dolphins in the QRL, and scored four tries in three of his first four games of 2023.

In round 8 of the Dolphins 2023 NRL season, Te Whare was named as a reserve against the Gold Coast Titans at Lang Park. In round 10 against the Cronulla Sutherland Sharks at Suncorp Stadium, Te Whare made his NRL debut and scored two tries for the Dolphins in their 36–16 victory. Te Whare next appeared for the Dolphins in their 18–58 loss to the Manly Warringah Sea Eagles in Round 15 at Brookvale Oval, where he played lock forward for the full eighty minutes.

Te Whare did not play any first grade games the following year. At the end of 2024, Te Whare was unsigned for the 2025 NRL season. On 16 December, it was announced that Te Whare had departed the Dolphins and signed to join Shizuoka Blue Revs in Japanese Rugby.

== NRL statistics ==
Year	Team	Games	Tries	Pts
2023	Dolphins	12	6	24

== Achievements and accolades ==
=== Individual ===
- Queensland Rugby League Awards Centre of the Year: Hostplus Cup 2022
