= Bug Hunter (band) =

American folk pop band

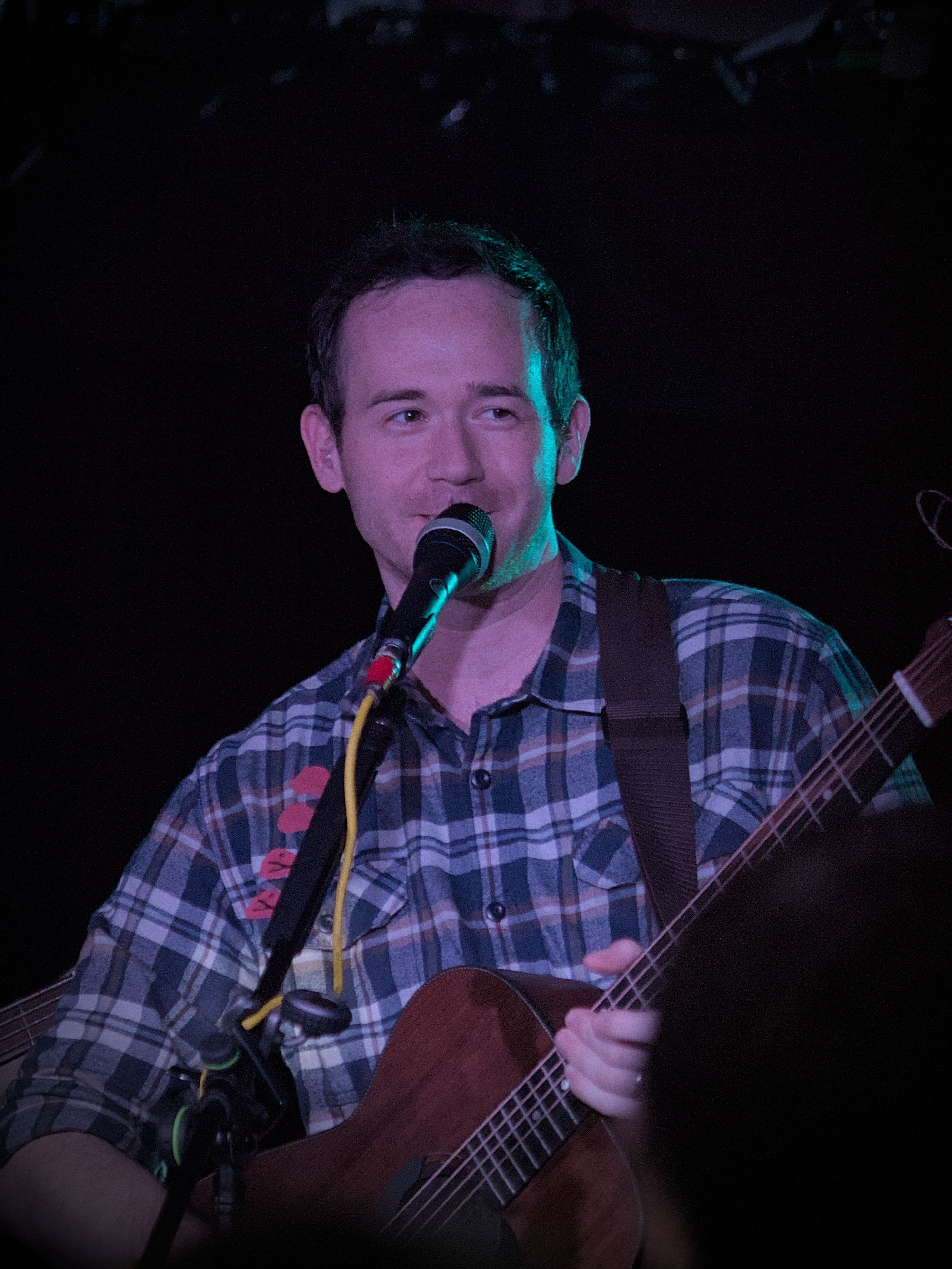
- Lead singer, Cody Hunter, playing in Manchester, in 2024

Background information
- Origin: Seattle, Washington
- Genres: Alternative rock; pop rock
- Years active: 2015–present
- Members: Cody Hunter; Jesse Gallaway; Kyle Hodgkinson
- Past members: Moe Hussein; Marcus Alcantara
- Website: bughunterbug.com

Bug Hunter is an American rock band formed in Seattle, Washington, in 2015 by lead vocalist and guitarist Cody 'Bug' Hunter. It began as a solo project by Hunter and later formed as a full band, with members consisting of Cody Hunter, Jesse Gallaway, and Kyle Hodgkinson. Former members include Moe Hussein and Marcus Alcantara. The band has released five studio albums: Torn Between a Couple (2017), The Rough Draft (2018), Bigger Than Myself (2020), Happiness (Without a Catch) (2023), and Repercussion Roulette (2026).

== History ==
In the spring of 2012, Cody Hunter began writing songs as a college student while taking music classes. Hunter later accumulated 70 written songs and began performing at open mics in Seattle, Washington in 2014. While working a full-time job, Hunter recorded some of these songs in his home's closet, and independently released Surge of Confidence under the name Bug on November 20, 2015. Hunter later recruited guitarist Moe Hussein, drummer Marcus Alcantara, and bassist Jesse Gallaway, renaming the band Bug Hunter and releasing their debut studio album Torn Between a Couple on March 20, 2017.

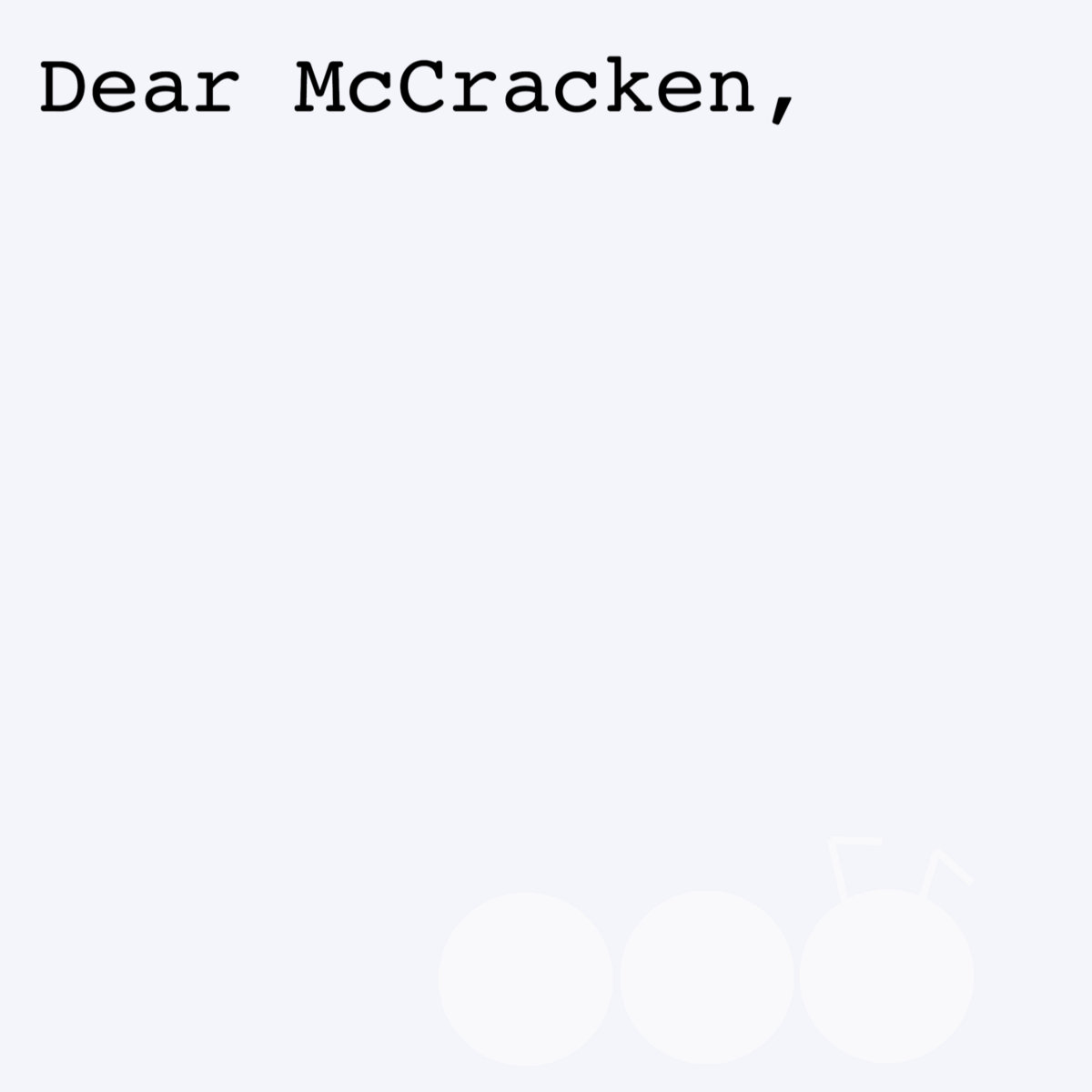
Single artwork for "Dear McCracken"

On July 17, 2017, Bug Hunter released the single "Dear McCracken", which received attention on streaming platforms and became the band's first song to amass over a million streams on Spotify. This led to the band starting a Kickstarter campaign to fund their second studio album The Rough Draft, which would contain the single. It reached 103% of its $4,500 goal and was later released on November 20, 2018. It includes the song "Disco! in the Panic Room", which accumulated over 16 million plays across streaming services by 2026 and has become the band's most-streamed song. The band then released the single "Take It Back" on September 20, 2019, appearing on their third studio album Bigger Than Myself alongside later singles "Pebbles" and "Pinecones". Bug Hunter once again used Kickstarter to fund it, receiving 154% of a $10,000 goal and releasing the album on August 20, 2020. The band's lineup changed during this time, with Gallaway additionally filling Hussein's position as guitarist and Kyle Hodgkinson joining the band to replace Alcantara as a drummer.

Bug Hunter released "2 Bed, 2 Bath (and a Ghost)", the lead single off Happiness (Without a Catch), on April 29, 2022. The album's corresponding Kickstarter campaign achieved 221% of its goal, funding the album with $33,200. Two more singles were released in 2023 in promotion of it: "Shocking Plot Twist" and "Platonic Best Friend". Their fourth studio album was released on September 8, 2023. Hunter has additionally co-hosted several seasons of the podcast Jam Mechanics with fellow musician Matt Johnston, known for their project The Narcissist Cookbook. The podcast has published 40 episodes, each consisting of the two writing and recording demos within three hours. They have also toured together annually since 2022.

In anticipation of their fifth studio album, Bug Hunter released the singles "Disc Golf" on May 31, 2024, and "Call Out Boy" on May 2, 2025. On January 31, 2026, Bug Hunter started a Kickstarter for their fifth studio album and an EP of Jam Mechanics songs. It surpassed its $20,000 goal in 36 minutes, raising $73,526 by the time it ended on February 20. In celebration, Bug Hunter released a studio version of "Swallowing Gum" from Surge of Confidence (2015). "Bottle Rocket Astronaut" was released as a standalone single on May 4 alongside a music video, amassing millions of plays upon release and being the band's most-streamed song of the year. The fundraised album was later announced to be Repercussion Roulette, and was released on September 25, 2026. The Jam Mechanics EP, entitled The Warden of Eden (Part 1), was released on October 30th 2026.

== Discography ==
=== Studio albums ===
Title	Album details
Torn Between a Couple	Released: March 20, 2017; Format: Digital download, CD, vinyl
The Rough Draft	Released: November 20, 2018; Format: Digital download, CD, vinyl
Bigger Than Myself	Released: August 20, 2020; Format: Digital download, CD, vinyl
Happiness (Without a Catch)	Released: September 8, 2023; Format: Digital download, CD, vinyl
Repercussion Roulette	Released: September 25, 2026; Format: Digital download, CD, vinyl

=== Singles ===
Title	Year	Album
"Dear McCracken"	2017	The Rough Draft
"Take It Back"	2019	Bigger Than Myself
"Making Up Words" (Acoustic)	2020	Non-album singles (Note: Acoustic performances of songs previously featured on Torn Between a Couple.)
"The Key To Being Lonely" (Acoustic)	2020	Non-album singles
"Pebbles"	2020	Bigger Than Myself
"Pinecones"	2020	Bigger Than Myself
"2 Bed, 2 Bath (and a Ghost)"	2022	Happiness (Without a Catch)
"Shocking Plot Twist"	2023	Happiness (Without a Catch)
"Platonic Best Friend"	2023	Happiness (Without a Catch)
"Disc Golf"	2024	Repercussion Roulette
"Call Out Boy"	2025	Repercussion Roulette
"Swallowing Gum"	2026	Non-album singles
"Bottle Rocket Astronaut"	2026	Non-album singles
