= Brayden McGrady =

Australian rugby league player

Personal information
- Born: 13 December 1996 (age 28) Goondiwindi, Queensland, Australia
- Height: 189 cm (6 ft 2 in)
- Weight: 98 kg (15 st 6 lb)

Playing information
- Position: Centre, wing
Club
Years	Team	Pld	T	G	FG	P
2023	Dolphins	1	1	0	0	4
- Source: As of 9 November 2025

Brayden McGrady (born 13 December 1996) is an Australian rugby league footballer who last played as a centre and winger for the Dolphins in the National Rugby League (NRL). He has also played in the Hostplus Cup (QRL) and the NSW Cup state competitions.

== Background ==
McGrady was born in Goondiwindi, Queensland.

== Playing career ==
=== Early career (2018–2023) ===
In 2018, McGrady played for the Tweed Heads Seagulls in the Hostplus Cup and scored twelve tries. From 2019 to 2020, he played for the Penrith Panthers in the NSW Cup, then returned to the Seagulls in 2021. McGrady played for the Norths Devils in 2022 and scored eighteen tries, including two tries in the Devils' 16-10 grand final victory over the Redcliffe Dolphins at Moreton Daily Stadium. In 2023, he transferred to the Redcliffe Dolphins and scored ten tries for their Hostplus side.

=== Dolphins (2023–present) ===
In round 17 of the Dolphins 2023 NRL season, McGrady made his NRL debut and scored a try for the Dolphins in their 20-48 loss to the Parramatta Eels at Sunshine Coast Stadium.
