= Ray Stone (rugby league) =

Australian rugby league footballer

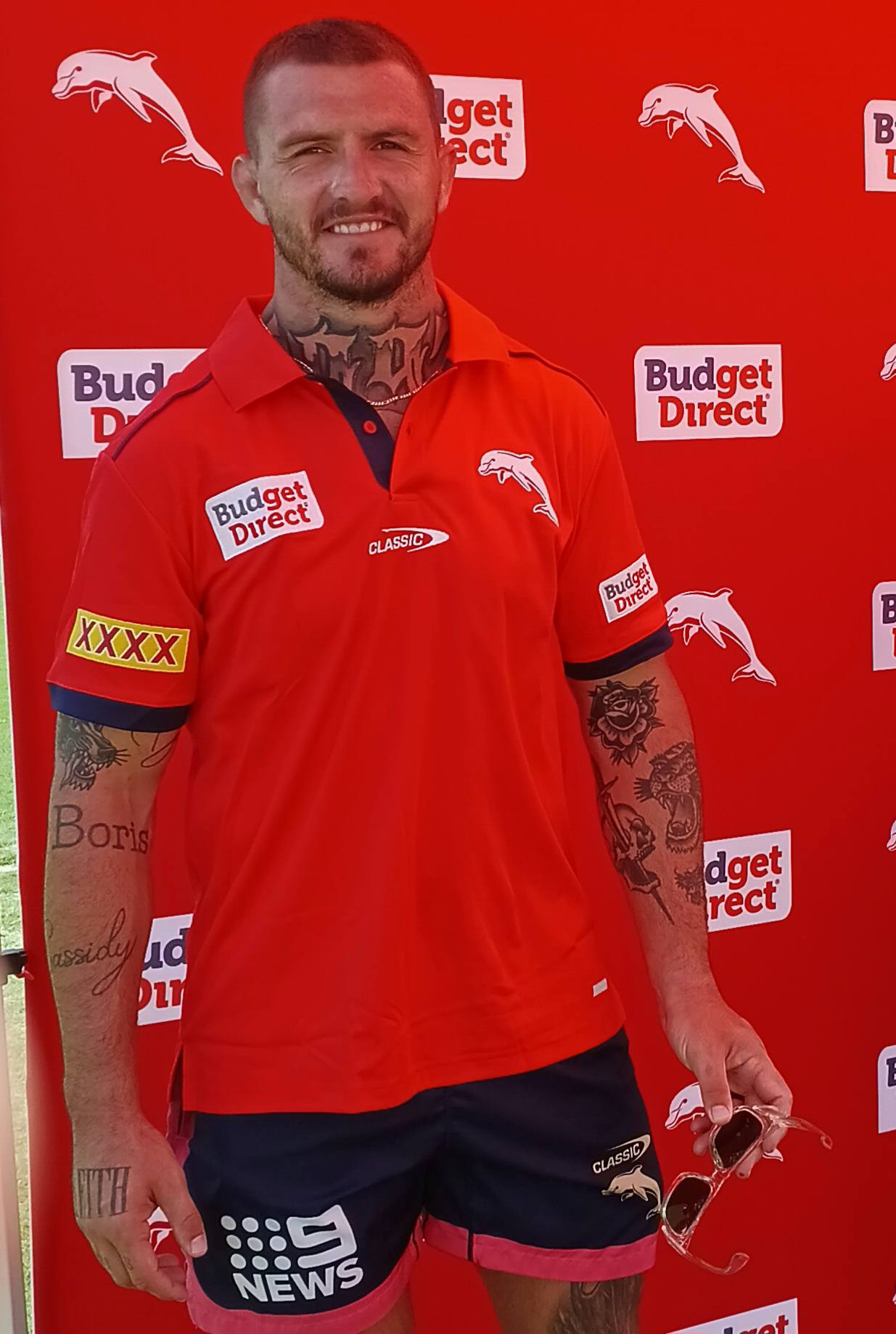

Personal information
- Full name: Raymond Stone
- Born: 6 June 1997 (age 29) Moss Vale, New South Wales, Australia
- Height: 180 cm (5 ft 11 in)
- Weight: 95 kg (14 st 13 lb)

Playing information
- Position: Lock, Hooker
Club
Years	Team	Pld	T	G	FG	P
2018–22	Parramatta Eels	31	4	0	0	16
2023–26	Dolphins	82	8	0	0	32
	Total	113	12	0	0	48
- Source: As of 22 November 2026

Ray Stone (born 6 June 1997) is an Australian professional rugby league footballer who last played as a lock for the Dolphins in the National Rugby League (NRL). He previously played for the Parramatta Eels in the NRL.

== Background ==
Stone was born and raised in Moss Vale, New South Wales, Australia.

== Playing career ==
=== Early career ===
Stone played junior rugby league football for the Moss Vale Dragons in the CRL competition and was selected in the 2015 Australian schoolboy team. He then played for the Wests Tigers in the SG Ball and Holden Cup until the end of the 2016 season.

The Parramatta Eels signed Stone for their 2017 under 20s team. He played lock for the majority of the season including in the Holden Cup Grand Final, Simultaneously, he played off the bench and at lock in nine games for Wentworthville in the Intrust Super Premiership. Stone was picked for the 20s Junior Kangaroos team and New South Wales under 20s State of Origin team.

Stone was re-signed to Parramatta's 30-man squad for the 2018 season, playing as a consistent starter for Wentworthville, appearing in fourteen games with two tries.

=== Parramatta Eels (2018-2022) ===
In round 22 of the 2018 NRL season, Stone made his NRL debut for Parramatta against the Melbourne Storm in a 20-4 defeat.

In round 6 of the 2019 NRL season, Stone played in the opening game of the new Western Sydney Stadium in a 51-6 win against the Wests Tigers. Stone re-signed with Parramatta until the end of the 2020 NRL season.

Stone made a total of six appearances for Parramatta in the 2019 NRL season. Stone played for Parramatta in their 58-0 victory over the Brisbane Broncos in the elimination final. Stone then played for the club's feeder side the Wentworthville Magpies in their Canterbury Cup NSW grand final defeat against Newtown at Bankwest Stadium.

On 4 November 2019, Stone signed a one-year contract extension with Parramatta for the 2020 season.

In round 7 of the 2020 NRL season, Stone scored his first try in the top grade as Parramatta defeated Canberra 25-24 in golden point extra-time at Western Sydney Stadium.

Stone played nine games for Parramatta in the 2021 NRL season as the club finished sixth on the table and qualified for the finals. Stone played in both finals matches for Parramatta including their 8-6 loss to Penrith in week two. In the semi-final against Penrith, Stone made a number of crucial errors in the game as the replacement hooker for the injured Reed Mahoney.

On 7 December 2021, Dolphins announced that Stone would be joining their team for their inaugural 2023 season.

In round 3 of the 2022 NRL season, Stone scored two tries for Parramatta including the winning try in golden point extra-time when the club defeated Melbourne 28-24 at AAMI Park. While scoring the match winning try, Stone tore his ACL, ending his season. "Ray Stone has today been ruled out for the 2022 season following confirmation that he has ruptured his anterior cruciate ligaments (ACL) during Saturday nights game against Melbourne" a club statement said. "He will undergo surgery in the coming days and then begin his rehabilitation for the 2023 season."

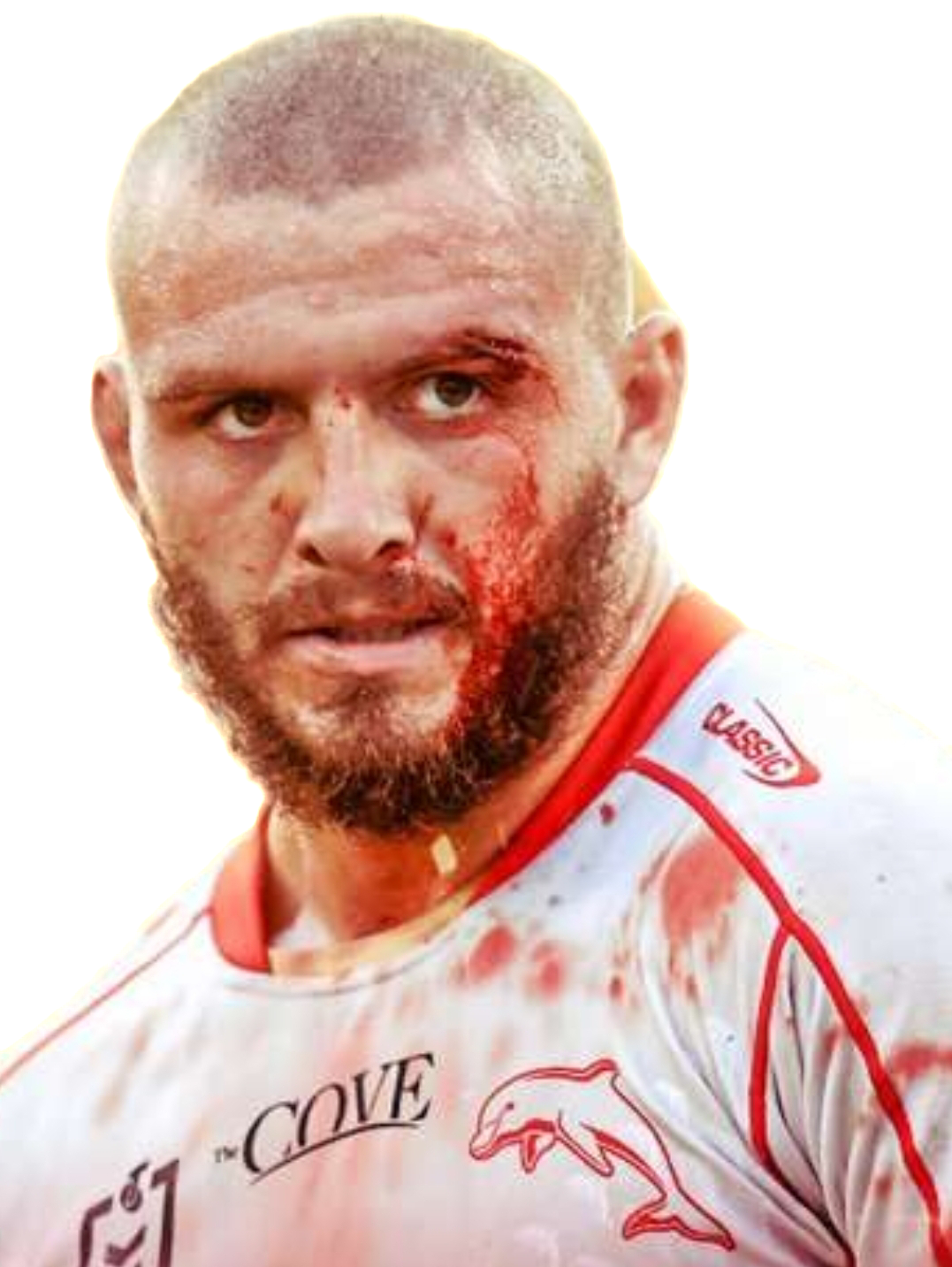
Ray Stone in 2023

=== Dolphins (2023-2026) ===
Stone made his club debut for the inaugural Dolphins team in round 1 of the 2023 NRL season coming off the bench as they pulled off a big upset defeating the Sydney Roosters 28-18 at Suncorp Stadium. On May 22, Stone re-signed with the club until 2026. Stone played a total of twenty-two games for the Dolphins in the 2024 NRL season as the club finished 10th on the table. In round 7 of the 2025 NRL season, Stone scored a double off the bench in a 42-22 upset win over the Melbourne Storm. Stone played twenty-two matches for the Dolphins in the 2025 NRL season as the club narrowly missed out on the finals finishing ninth. During the 2026 NRL season, Stone confirmed that he would be retiring at the end of the Dolphin's campaign. Stone played 21 games for the club including their preliminary final loss against the Sydney Roosters.

== Statistics ==
Year	Team	Games	Tries	Pts
2018	Parramatta Eels	1		
2019	Parramatta Eels	6		
2020	Parramatta Eels	12	1	4
2021	Parramatta Eels	9	1	4
2022	Parramatta Eels	3	2	8
2023	Dolphins	17	1	4
2024	Dolphins	22		
2025	Dolphins	22	4	16
2026	Dolphins	20	3	12
	Totals	112	12	44
