= Lachlan Hubner =

Australian rugby league player

Personal information
- Born: 3 January 2000 (age 26) Rockhampton, Queensland, Australia
- Height: 180 cm (5 ft 11 in)
- Weight: 95 kg (14 st 13 lb)

Playing information
- Position: Lock
Club
Years	Team	Pld	T	G	FG	P
2024	Dolphins	4	0	0	0	0
2025–	South Sydney	44	2	0	0	8
	Total	48	2	0	0	8
- Source: As of 11 September 2026

Lachlan Hubner (born 3 January 2000) is an Australian professional rugby league footballer who plays as a lock for the South Sydney Rabbitohs in the National Rugby League (NRL).

He previously played for the Dolphins.

== Playing career ==
=== Early years ===
Hubner played his junior rugby league with the North Knights Junior Rugby League in Rockhampton. He attended private Catholic school, Emmaus College, where he captained the school's First XIII at the Confraternity Carnival and was a promising rugby union player.

=== Central Queensland Capras ===
Hubner played fifty-eight games for the Central Queensland Capras in the Queensland Cup competition between March 2021 and April 2024.

=== Dolphins (NRL) ===
Hubner made his NRL debut with the Dolphins in the Round 6 match against the Brisbane Broncos at Lang Park on 12 April 2024 after Thomas Flegler was withdrawn from the game due to injury.

=== South Sydney ===
On 19 August 2024, Hubner signed a two-year deal to join South Sydney starting in 2025. Hubner made his club debut for South Sydney in round 1 of the 2025 NRL season against his former side the Dolphins.

On 28 July, South Sydney announced that Hubner had re-signed with the club until the end of 2028. Hubner played 20 matches for South Sydney in the 2025 NRL season which saw the club finish 14th on the table. Hubner played 24 games for South Sydney in the 2026 NRL season as the club finished 6th on the table and qualified for the finals. He played in South Sydney's upset elimination final loss to Newcastle.

== Statistics ==
Year	Team	Games	Tries	Pts
2024	Dolphins	3		
2025	South Sydney Rabbitohs	20	1	4
2026	South Sydney Rabbitohs	5	1	4
	Totals	29	2	8
