= Harrison Graham (rugby league) =

Australian rugby league player (born 2001)

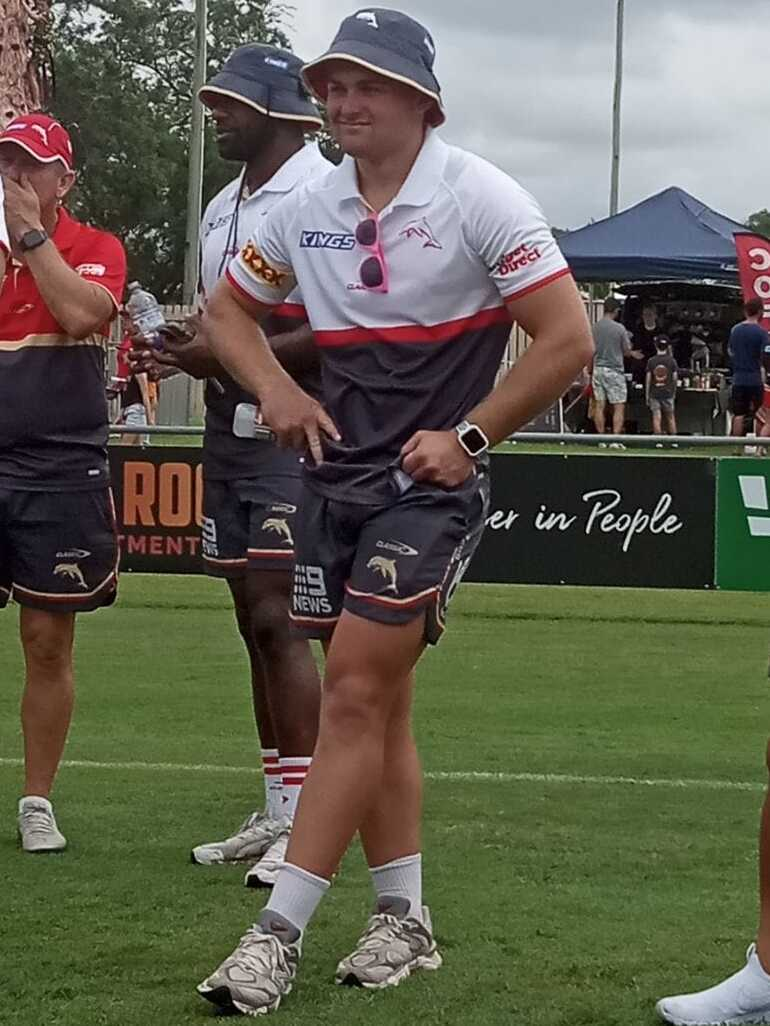

Personal information
- Born: 11 September 2001 (age 25) Lismore, New South Wales, Australia
- Height: 177 cm (5 ft 10 in)
- Weight: 83 kg (13 st 1 lb)

Playing information
- Position: Hooker
Club
Years	Team	Pld	T	G	FG	P
2023–25	Dolphins	11	2	0	0	8
2026–	Newcastle Knights	20	2	0	0	8
	Total	31	4	0	0	16
- Source: As of 4 October 2026

Harrison Graham (born 11 September 2001) is an Australian rugby league footballer who plays as a hooker for the Newcastle Knights in the National Rugby League (NRL).

== Background ==
Graham was born in Lismore, New South Wales. He first played Rugby League with Ballina Seagulls before moving to Queensland with his family when he was eight years old. He was educated at Iona College Brisbane. He is eligible to represent the USA.

== Playing career ==
Graham played junior football for the Wynnum Manly Seagulls in Queensland and progressed to junior representative teams. He was also in the Wynnum Manly 2019 Auswide Bank Mal Meninga Cup grand final squad. Harrison played in the Queensland under-18 State of Origin team as well as the Queensland under-19 team.

=== Dolphins (2023-present) ===
In round 17 of the 2023 NRL season, Graham made his NRL debut with the Dolphins against the Parramatta Eels at Sunshine Coast Stadium. In total, he played six games for the Dolphins in 2023.
