= Mark Nicholls (rugby league) =

Australian former rugby league footballer

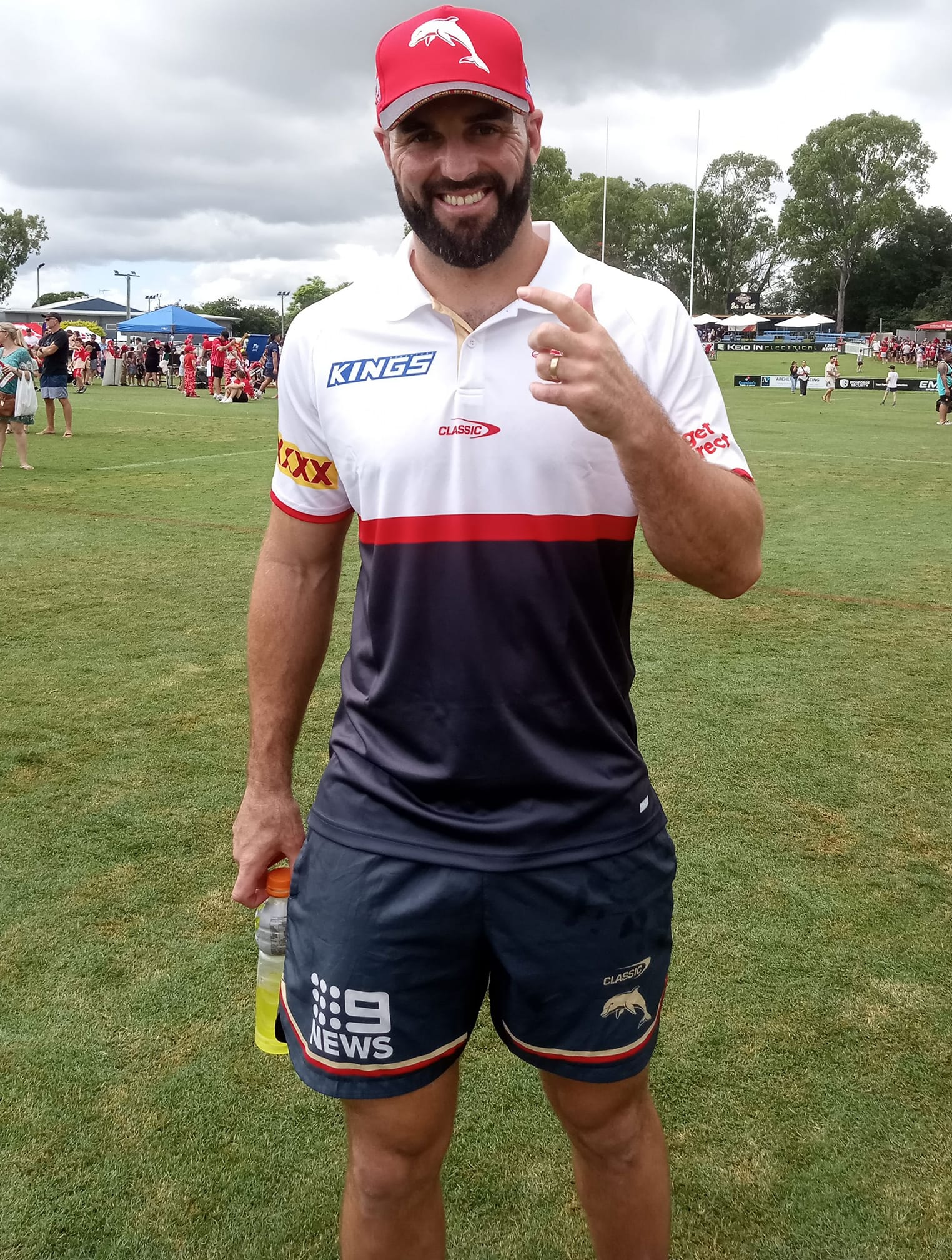

Personal information
- Full name: Mark Robert Nicholls
- Born: 5 January 1990 (age 36) Leeton, New South Wales, Australia
- Height: 194 cm (6 ft 4 in)
- Weight: 104 kg (16 st 5 lb)

Playing information
- Position: Prop
Club
Years	Team	Pld	T	G	FG	P
2012–15	Canberra Raiders	19	1	0	0	4
2016–17	Melbourne Storm	9	0	0	0	0
2018–22	South Sydney	100	6	0	0	24
2023–25	Dolphins	66	8	1	0	34
	Total	194	15	1	0	62
Representative
Years	Team	Pld	T	G	FG	P
2015	NSW Residents	1	0	0	0	0
- Source: As of 7 September 2025

Mark Nicholls (born 5 January 1990) is a former Australian professional rugby league footballer.

He played for the Dolphins, the South Sydney Rabbitohs, the Melbourne Storm and the Canberra Raiders in the National Rugby League (NRL).

== Background ==
Nicholls was born in Wagga Wagga, New South Wales. He played junior rugby league for the Leeton Greenies and Gungahlin Bulls, before being signed by the Canberra Raiders.

== Education ==
When the NRL announced its annual Academic Team of the Year for 2023 in recognition of the educational achievements of current players off-field, Nicholls' academic record included a Graduate Certificate of Program Management from Queensland University of Technology (2021), a Diploma of Business from Australian Vocational Training Company (2013) and a Bachelor of Sport Management & Coaching Science from the University of Canberra (2012).

== Playing career ==
=== Early career ===
From 2008 to 2010, Nicholls played for the Canberra Raiders'NYC team. In a 2009 Holden Cup game v the Wests Tigers, Nicholls scored 4 tries in the Raiders 50-10 victory to announce himself as a player of immense promise. In October 2010, he played for the Junior Kangaroos against the Junior Kiwis.

=== Canberra Raiders (2012–2015) ===
In round 17 of the 2012 NRL season, Nicholls made his NRL debut for the Raiders against the St. George Illawarra Dragons. He played twelve consecutive games that year, coming off the bench as a prop. In rd 25, 2012 v the Canterbury Bulldogs, Nicholls scored his 1st try in 1st grade. A remarkable solo effort that saw him chip, chase and regather before stepping fullback Ben Barba to score under the sticks.

On 25 April 2013, Nicholls re-signed with Canberra on a two-year contract. However, he only played twice for Canberra in those two seasons. Otherwise, Nicholls played for the New South Wales Residents against the Queensland Residents in July 2014. He played a total of five games for Canberra in 2015.

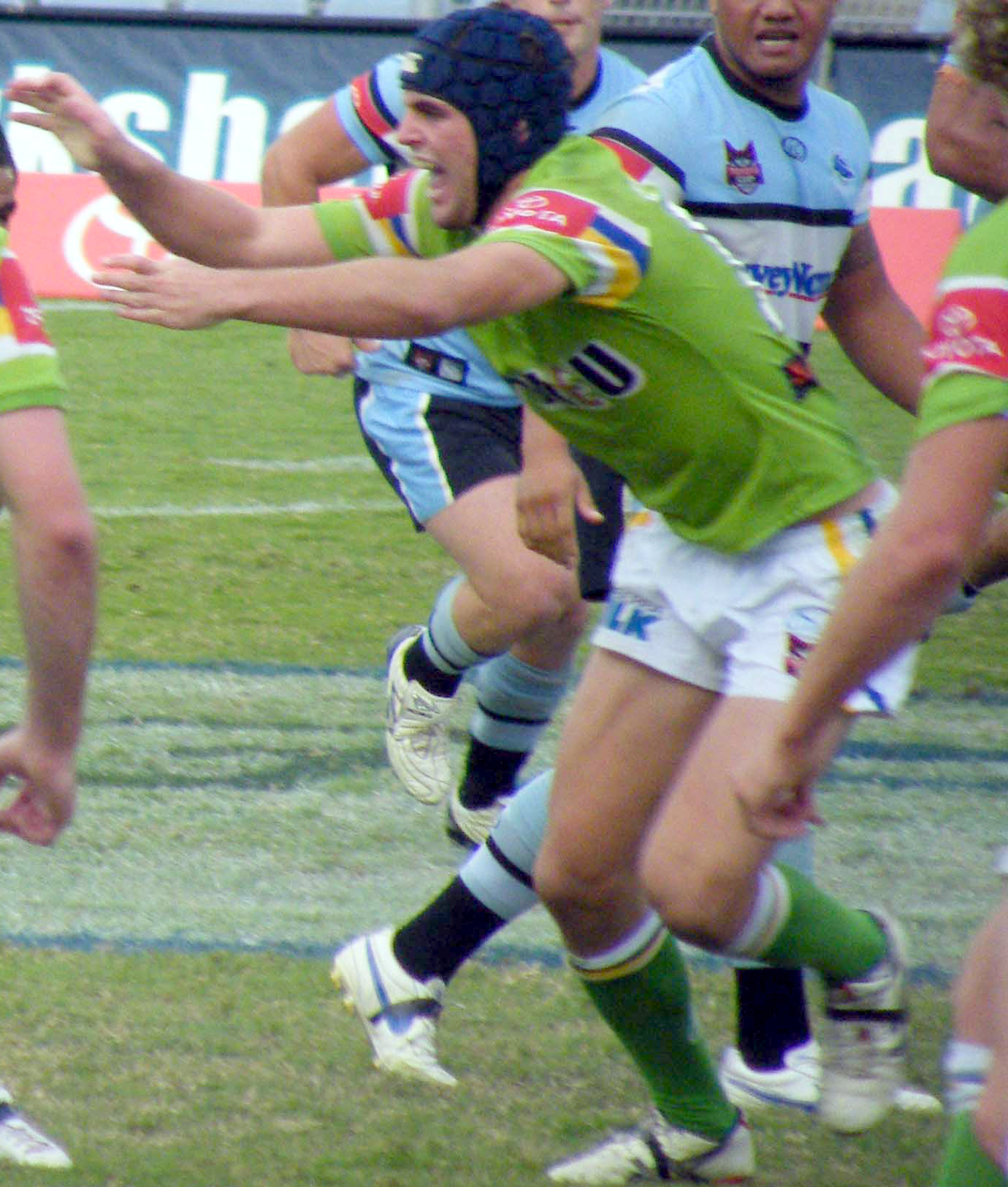
Nicholls in 2009

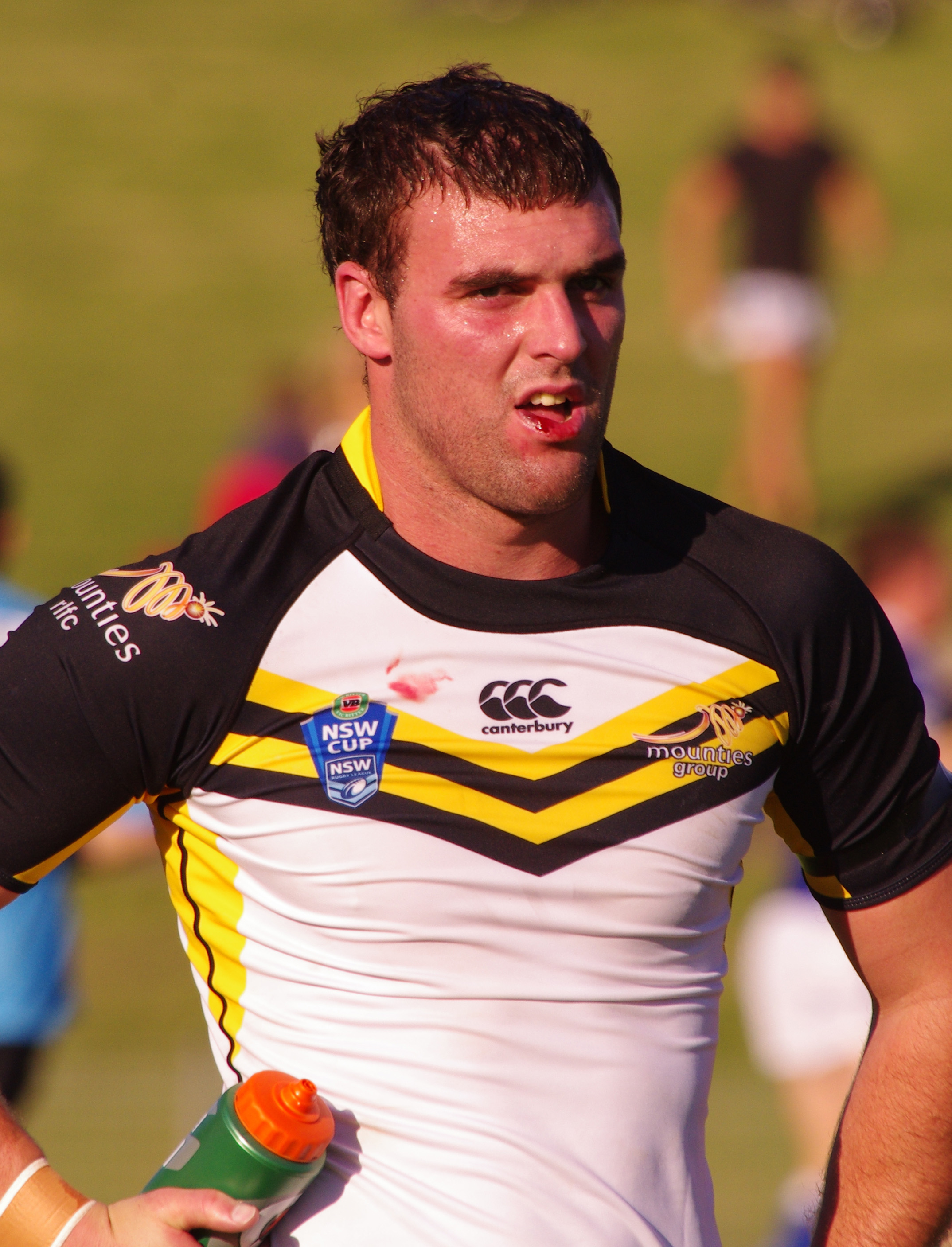
Nicholls in 2013

=== Melbourne Storm (2016–2017) ===
In 2016, Nicholls commenced a one-year contract with the Melbourne Storm. On 1 February, he was named in the Storm's 2016 NRL Auckland Nines squad but did not appear for Melbourne in the 2016 NRL season.

Nicholls was named in the Storm squad for the 2017 NRL Auckland Nines. He made his Melbourne debut against the Penrith Panthers in round 5 of the 2017 NRL season. He made a total of nine appearances for Melbourne. The club itself won the minor premiership and the 2017 NRL Grand Final; however, Nicholls did not play in the latter.

=== South Sydney Rabbitohs (2018–2022) ===
Nicholls made his South Sydney debut in round 1 of the 2018 NRL season, starting at prop in South Sydney's 20–32 loss to the New Zealand Warriors. He made a total of twelve appearances for South Sydney that season. In the 2019 NRL season, South Sydney finished third on the table and qualified for the finals. Nicholls made a total of twenty-four appearances including all three of the club's finals games; one of which was the preliminary final loss against his former club Canberra.

In round 10 of the 2020 NRL season, Nicholls scored his first try for South Sydney in their 18–20 loss to the Newcastle Knights at Bankwest Stadium. He made a total of nineteen appearances for Souths and played in all three of the club's finals matches including their preliminary final loss to Penrith. In round 24 of the 2021 NRL season, Nicholls scored two tries for South Sydney in a 52–12 victory over arch-rivals the Sydney Roosters. In round 25, he was named captain for the match against St. George Illawarra, after South Sydney chose to rest Adam Reynolds in the lead-up to the finals. Nicholls played a total of twenty-seven games for South Sydney in the 2021 NRL season including the club's 2021 NRL Grand Final loss to Penrith.

In the 2022 NRL season, Nicholls scored one try in eighteen games for South Sydney including all three of the club's finals matches when they reached the preliminary final for a fifth straight season. Souths lost the preliminary final 12–32 to Penrith, the eventual premiers.

=== Dolphins (2023–2025) ===
In January 2022, Nicholls signed a two-year deal with the Dolphins from 2023 onwards. He made his club debut for the inaugural Dolphins team in round 1 of the 2023 NRL season, scoring a try as the new team pulled off a big upset defeating the Sydney Roosters 28–18 at Suncorp Stadium. In round 6, Nicholls captained the Dolphins in their 32–22 win against the North Queensland Cowboys at Queensland Country Bank Stadium due to regular captain Jesse Bromwich missing the game because of a throat infection.

In round 8, Nicholls scored a try for the Dolphins in their 28–26 victory over the Gold Coast Titans at Suncorp Stadium. During that match, he broke a thumb and subsequently underwent surgery to stabilise the joint, rendering him unfit to play for the next few weeks. Nicholls next played in round 13 and scored a try for the Dolphins in their 26–12 victory over the St. George Illawarra Dragons at Kayo Stadium. He finished 2023 with twenty-one appearances, three tries and 93.9% tackle efficiency. In September, the Dolphins' Inaugural Presentation Ball was held at Brisbane Convention and Exhibition Centre, and Nicholls received the club's annual Best Forward award.

On 15 May 2024, Nicholls re-signed with the Dolphins until the end of 2025. Nicholls played a total of 23 games for the Dolphins in the 2024 NRL season as the club finished 10th on the table.

=== 2025 ===
Nicholls was named in the team to play in round one of the 2025 NRL season, but he later withdrew from the team to protect his home during Tropical Cyclone Alfred. On 4 September 2025, Nicholls announced his retirement from the NRL.

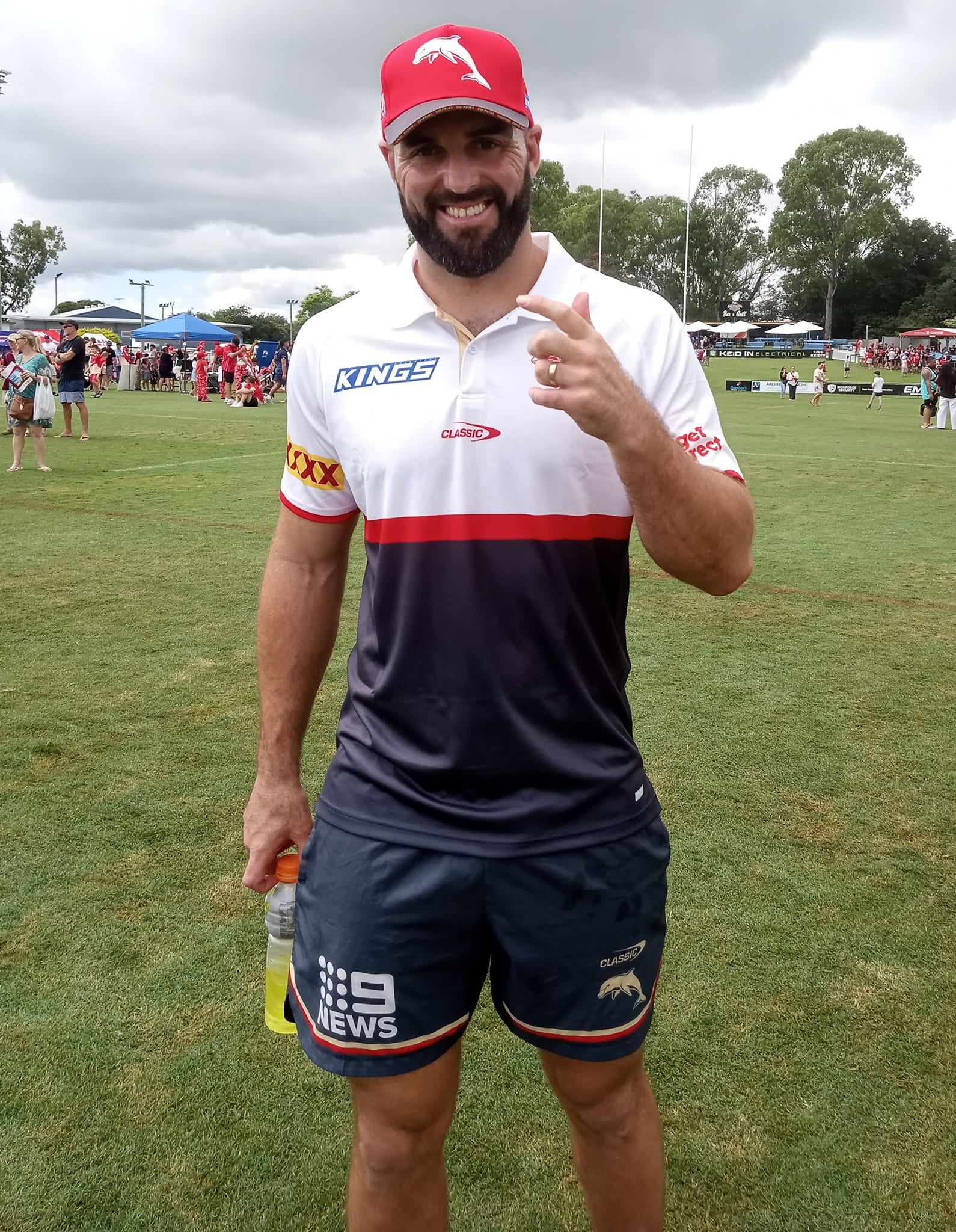
Nicholls in Brisbane

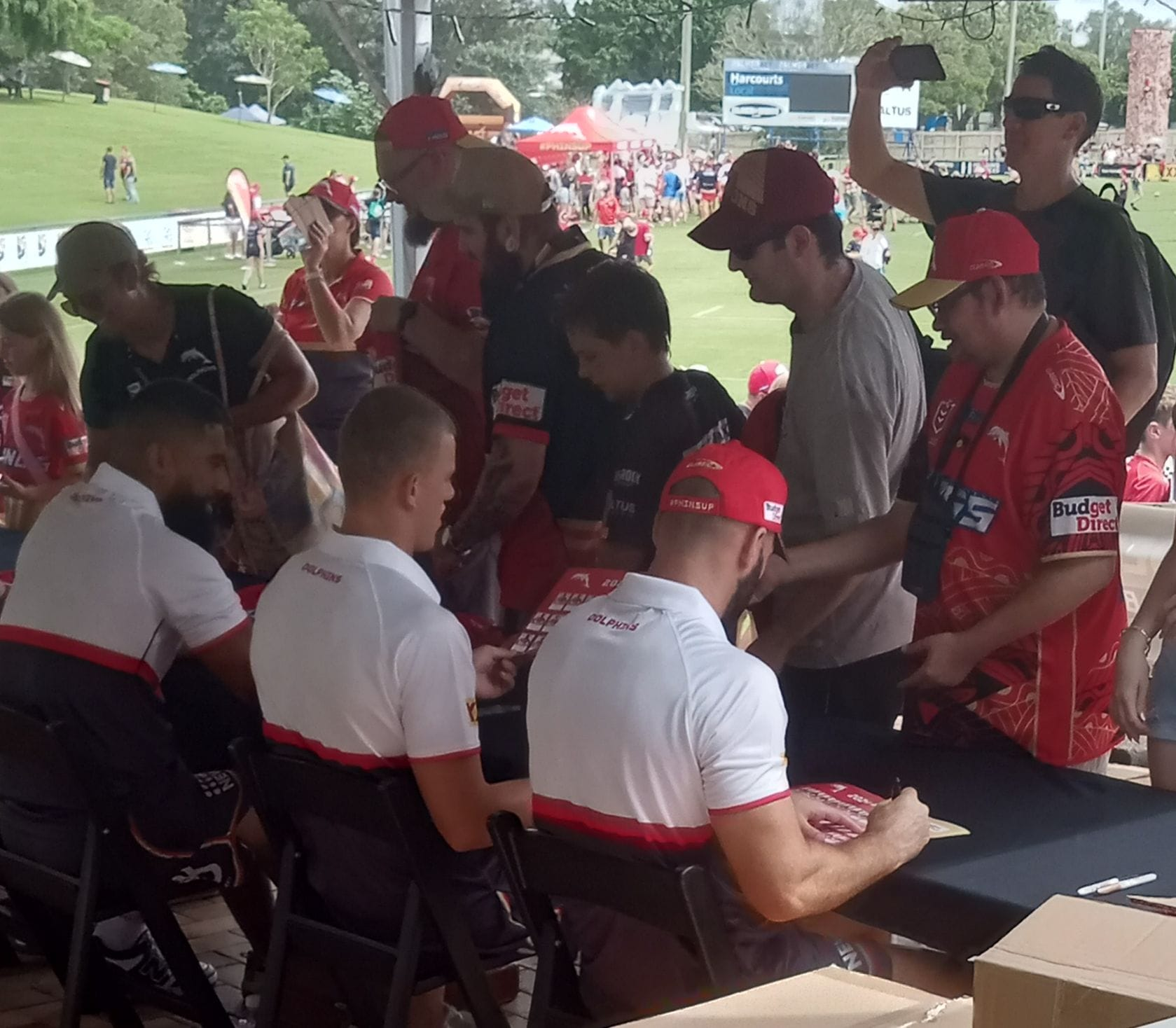
Nicholls seated on right

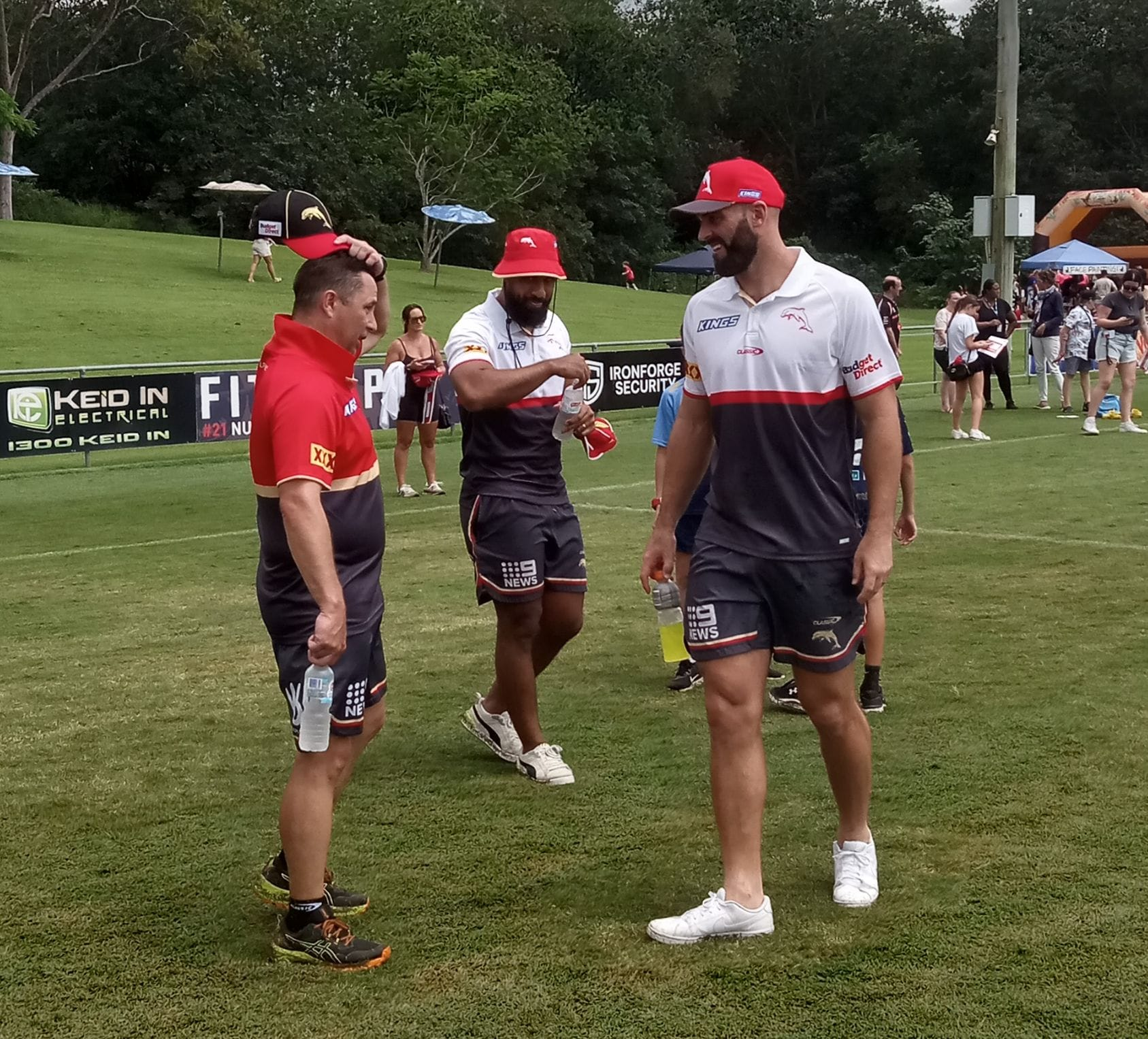
Nicholls (right) in 2024

== Post playing ==
After his retirement from the NRL, Nicholls took up a role as an ambassador with the Dolphins.

== Statistics ==
Year	Team	Games	Tries	Goals	Pts
2012	Canberra Raiders	12	1		4
2013	Canberra Raiders	2			
2015	Canberra Raiders	4			
2017	Melbourne Storm	9			
2018	South Sydney Rabbitohs	12			
2019	South Sydney Rabbitohs	24			
2020	South Sydney Rabbitohs	19	2		8
2021	South Sydney Rabbitohs	27	3		12
2022	South Sydney Rabbitohs	18	1		4
2023	Dolphins	21	3		12
2024	Dolphins	23	3		12
2025	Dolphins	22	2	1	10
	Totals	194	15	1	62

== Personal life ==
On 2 November 2019, Nicholls married professional model and executive assistant Perrie Davis in the Great Hall at the University of Sydney. Perrie is also an accredited pilates instructor. The couple have two daughters and bought a house in the Moreton Bay region of Queensland in 2022.
