= Sean O'Sullivan (rugby league) =

Australian rugby league footballer

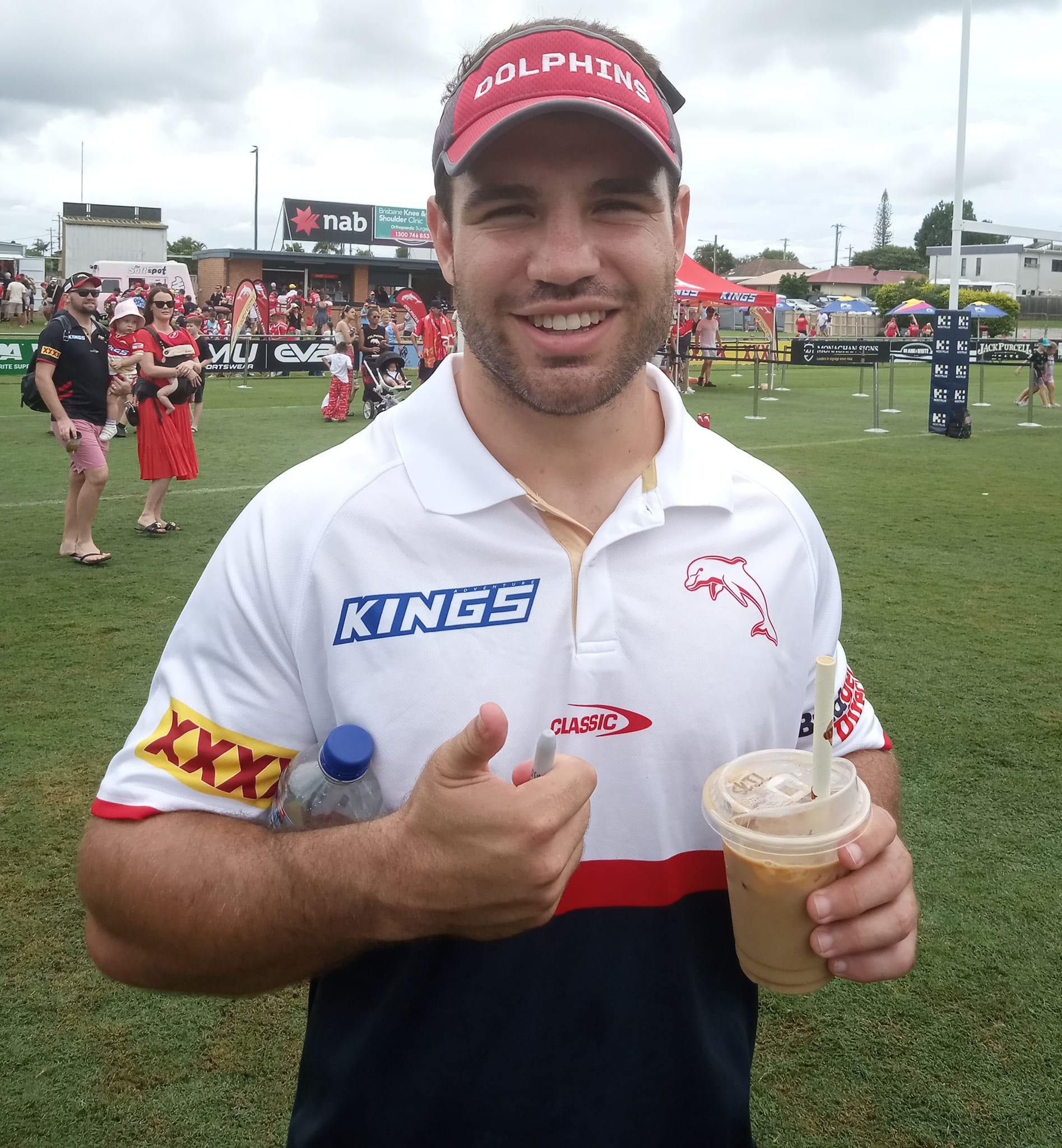

Personal information
- Full name: Sean Thomas O'Sullivan
- Born: 21 August 1998 (age 28) Sydney, New South Wales, Australia
- Height: 179 cm (5 ft 10 in)
- Weight: 86 kg (13 st 8 lb)

Playing information
- Position: Halfback, Five-eighth
Club
| Years | Team | Pld | T | G | FG | P |
|---|---|---|---|---|---|---|
| 2018 | Sydney Roosters | 1 | 1 | 0 | 0 | 4 |
| 2019–20 | Brisbane Broncos | 8 | 0 | 0 | 0 | 0 |
| 2021 | New Zealand Warriors | 12 | 2 | 0 | 0 | 8 |
| 2022 | Penrith Panthers | 11 | 2 | 2 | 0 | 12 |
| 2023–25 | Dolphins | 28 | 2 | 2 | 1 | 14 |
| 2026 | Canterbury Bulldogs | 6 | 0 | 0 | 0 | 0 |
| 2027– | St Helens | 0 | 0 | 0 | 0 | 0 |
| | Total | 66 | 7 | 4 | 1 | 38 |
Representative
| Years | Team | Pld | T | G | FG | P |
| 2018 | NSW Residents | 1 | 1 | 0 | 0 | 4 |
- Source: As of 15 November 2026
- Relatives: Matthew Lodge (brother-in-law)

Sean Thomas O'Sullivan (born 21 August 1998) is an Australian rugby league footballer who plays as a halfback for St Helens RFC in the Super League.

He has previously played for the Penrith Panthers, the New Zealand Warriors, the Dolphins, the Brisbane Broncos and the Sydney Roosters in the NRL.

== Background ==
O'Sullivan was born in Sydney of paternal Irish descent and Maltese on his mother side. His father is NRL recruitment officer Peter O'Sullivan, and his brother-in-law is NRL front rower Matthew Lodge.

O'Sullivan played junior rugby league for the Glenmore Park Brumbies in the Penrith Rugby League.

== Playing career ==
=== Sydney Roosters (2018) ===
O'Sullivan made his first grade debut and scored a try in round 18 of the 2018 NRL season for the Sydney Roosters against the Gold Coast Titans.

=== Brisbane Broncos (2019–2020) ===
O'Sullivan signed a two-year contract with the Brisbane Broncos commencing in the 2019 NRL season. Altogether, he played eight games with Brisbane over two seasons.

=== New Zealand Warriors (2021) ===
O'Sullivan joined the New Zealand Warriors for the 2021 NRL season, made twelve appearances and scored two tries.

=== Penrith Panthers (2022) ===
In 2022, O'Sullivan joined reigning premiers Penrith on a one-year deal. His club debut for Penrith was in round 1 of the 2022 NRL season filling in for the injured Nathan Cleary against Manly. In total, O'Sullivan played twelve NRL games, scored two tries and kicked two goals for Penrith. O’Sullivan served as 18th man (injury replacement) for Penrith in the 2022 NRL grand final victory, but did not take the field during the match. Otherwise, he spent most of the year playing for Penrith's NSW Cup team, including their 29–22 grand final victory over Canterbury-Bankstown Bulldogs.

=== Dolphins (2023–25) ===
O'Sullivan signed a three-year deal to join the newly licensed Dolphins (NRL) club. His club debut for the Dolphins was in their inaugural round 1 match of the 2023 NRL season starting at halfback as they pulled off a big upset defeating the Sydney Roosters 28–18 at Suncorp Stadium. In round 23 of the 2024 NRL season, O'Sullivan kicked a two-point field goal in golden point extra-time which won the game for the Dolphins 34-32 against the New Zealand Warriors.

On 24 September 2025, it was announced that O'Sullivan had signed a deal with Canterbury ahead of the 2026 NRL season.

=== Canterbury-Bankstown Bulldogs ===
On 10 November 2025, the Canterbury club officially confirmed the signing of O'Sullivan for 2026 with an option for the 2027 season. O'Sullivan was limited to just six matches for Canterbury in the 2026 NRL season. In round 20, he starred for Canterbury in their 32-0 victory over the Wests Tigers but strangely was not retained for the following game and did not feature for the first grade side for the rest of the season.

=== St Helens R.F.C. ===
On 8 September 2026 it was reported that he had signed for St Helens RFC in the Super League initially on a one-year deal.

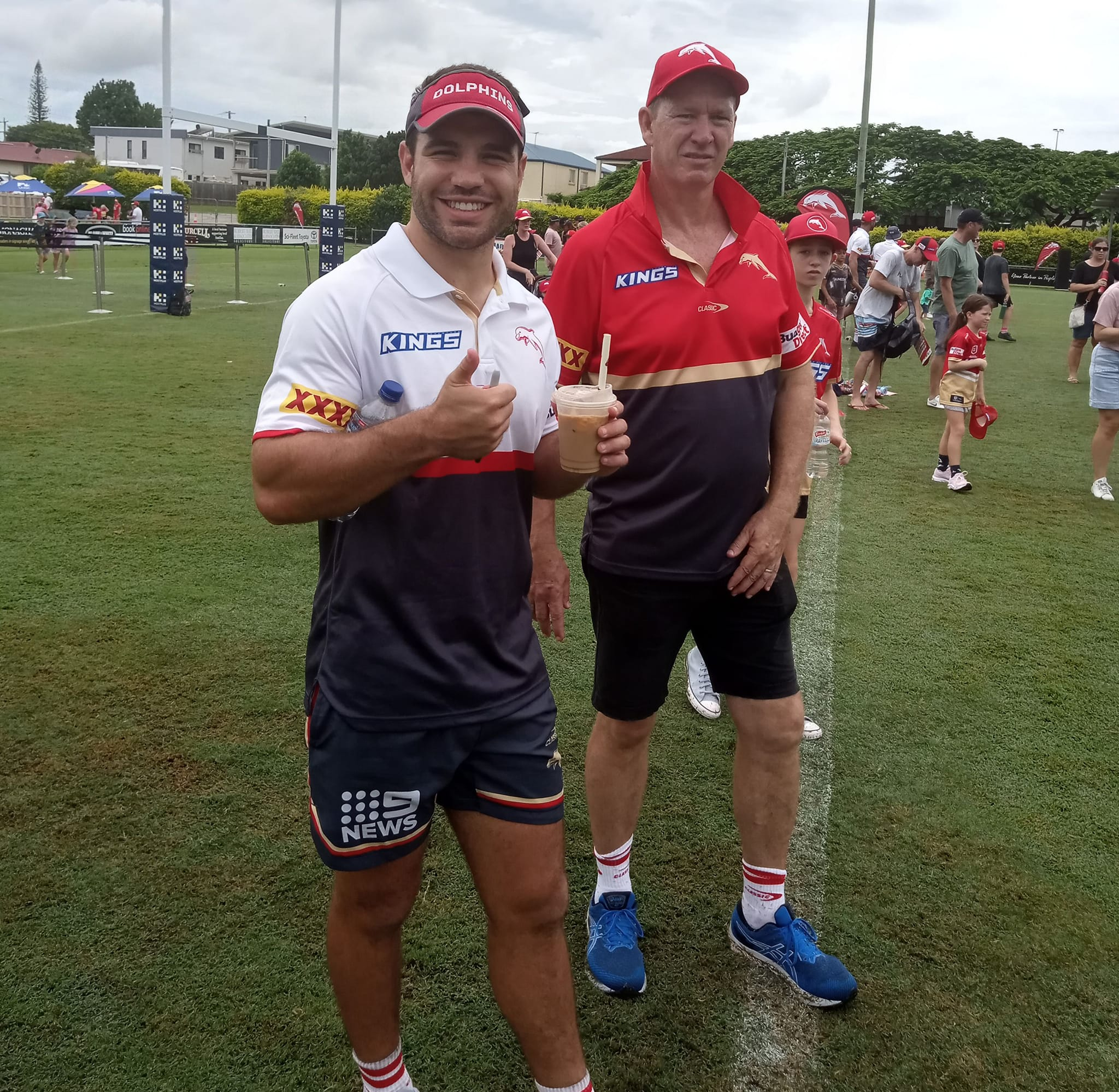
Sean O'Sullivan on left

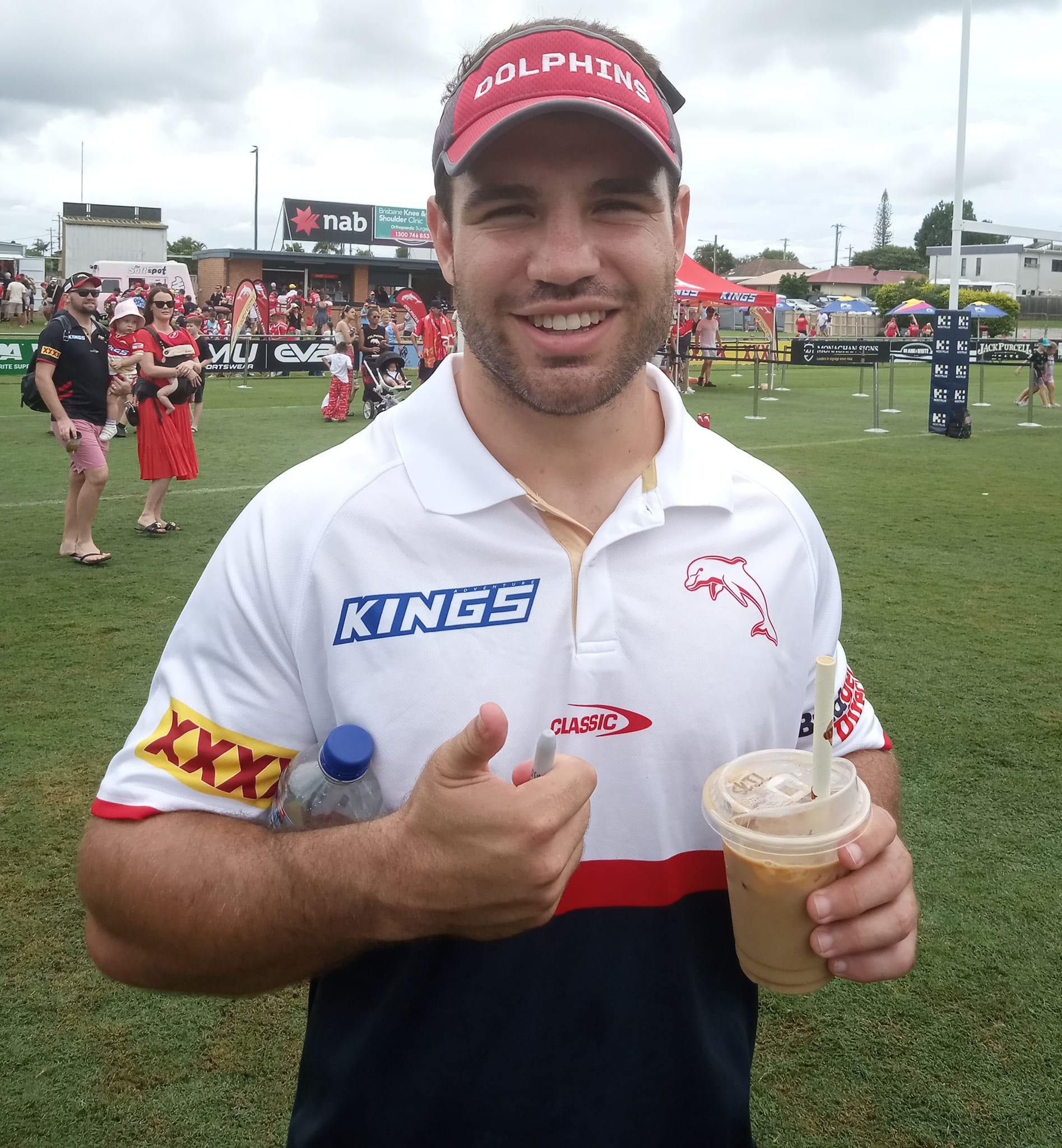
Sean O'Sullivan in Brisbane 2024

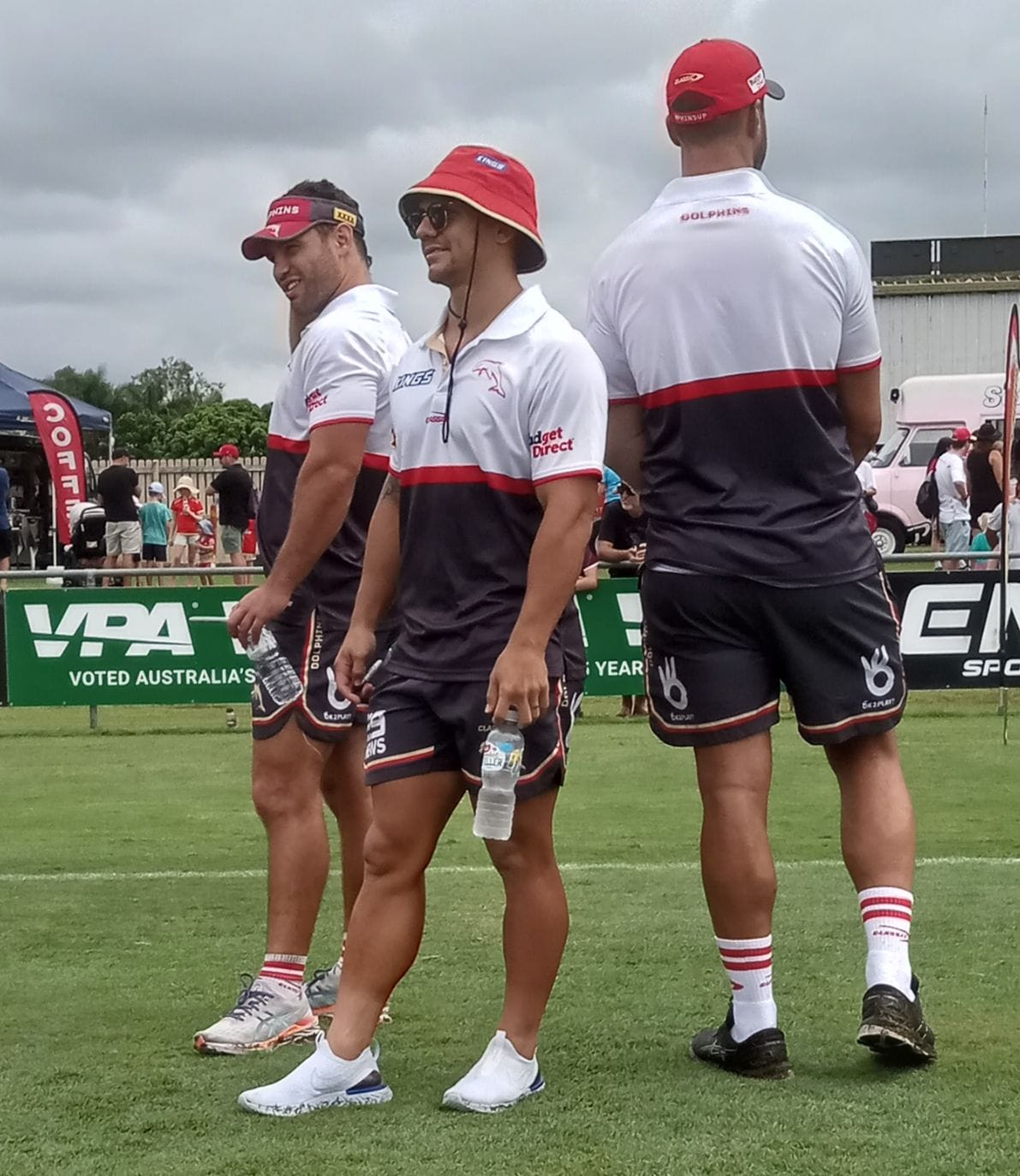
Sean O'Sullivan, Kodi Nikorima and Jesse Bromwich

== Statistics ==
| Year | Team | Games | Tries | Goals | FGs | Pts |
|---|---|---|---|---|---|---|
| 2018 | Sydney Roosters | 1 | 1 | | | 4 |
| 2019 | Brisbane Broncos | 5 | | | | |
| 2020 | Brisbane Broncos | 3 | | | | |
| 2021 | Warriors | 12 | 2 | | | 8 |
| 2022 | Penrith Panthers | 11 | 2 | 2 | | 12 |
| 2023 | Dolphins | 14 | 1 | 2 | | 8 |
| 2024 | Dolphins | 10 | 1 | | 1 | 4 |
| 2025 | Dolphins | 4 | | | | |
| 2026 | Canterbury-Bankstown Bulldogs | 6 | | | | |
| 2027 | St Helens RFC | | | | | |
| | Totals | 66 | 7 | 4 | 2 | 38 |
