= 2025 Dolphins (NRL) season =

2025 NRL rugby league season

2025 Dolphins season
- NRL Rank: 9th
- Play-off result: DNQ
- 2025 record: Wins: 12; losses: 12
- Points scored: For: 721; against: 596 (Rd 27)

Team information
- CEO: Terry Reader
- Head Coach: Kristian Woolf
- Captain: Tom Gilbert (Rds 1–4, 6–11) Felise Kaufusi (Rds 5, 12-15, 22, 25-27) Isaiya Katoa (Rds 16-27)
- Stadium: Suncorp Stadium, Kayo Stadium
- Avg. attendance: 21,820

Top scorers
- Tries: Hamiso Tabuai-Fidow (22), Herbie Farnworth (12), Jamayne Isaako (11) (Rd 27)
- Goals: Jamayne Isaako (117) (Rd 27)
- Points: Jamayne Isaako (278) (Rd 27)
← 2024	List of seasons	2026 →

The 2025 Dolphins season was the Dolphins club's third season in the National Rugby League (NRL) competition in Australia. The previous year's assistant coach Kristian Woolf succeeded Wayne Bennett as head coach. Woolf's first victory was in round 5 against the Gold Coast Titans at Cbus Super Stadium.

In round 11 against the New Zealand Warriors at Suncorp Stadium, referee Peter Gough incorrectly called "play on" after New Zealand spilt the ball forward; the next play resulted in a converted try worth six points. At full-time, the Dolphins lost the match by four points. The following week at Accor Stadium, the Dolphins achieved their first ever victory over the Canterbury-Bankstown Bulldogs. Consequently, the Dolphins have recorded wins against every other NRL side since their entry into the competition. In round 14, the Dolphins recorded their largest win by defeating the St George Illawarra Dragons 56-6. This record was overturned by their 58-4 victory against the North Queensland Cowboys in the following round.

Despite finishing the 2025 season in ninth place and missing the finals, the Dolphins scored the most points (721) of any team in the competition. With 278 points, Dolphins winger Jamayne Isaako individually recorded the highest NRL points in 2025.

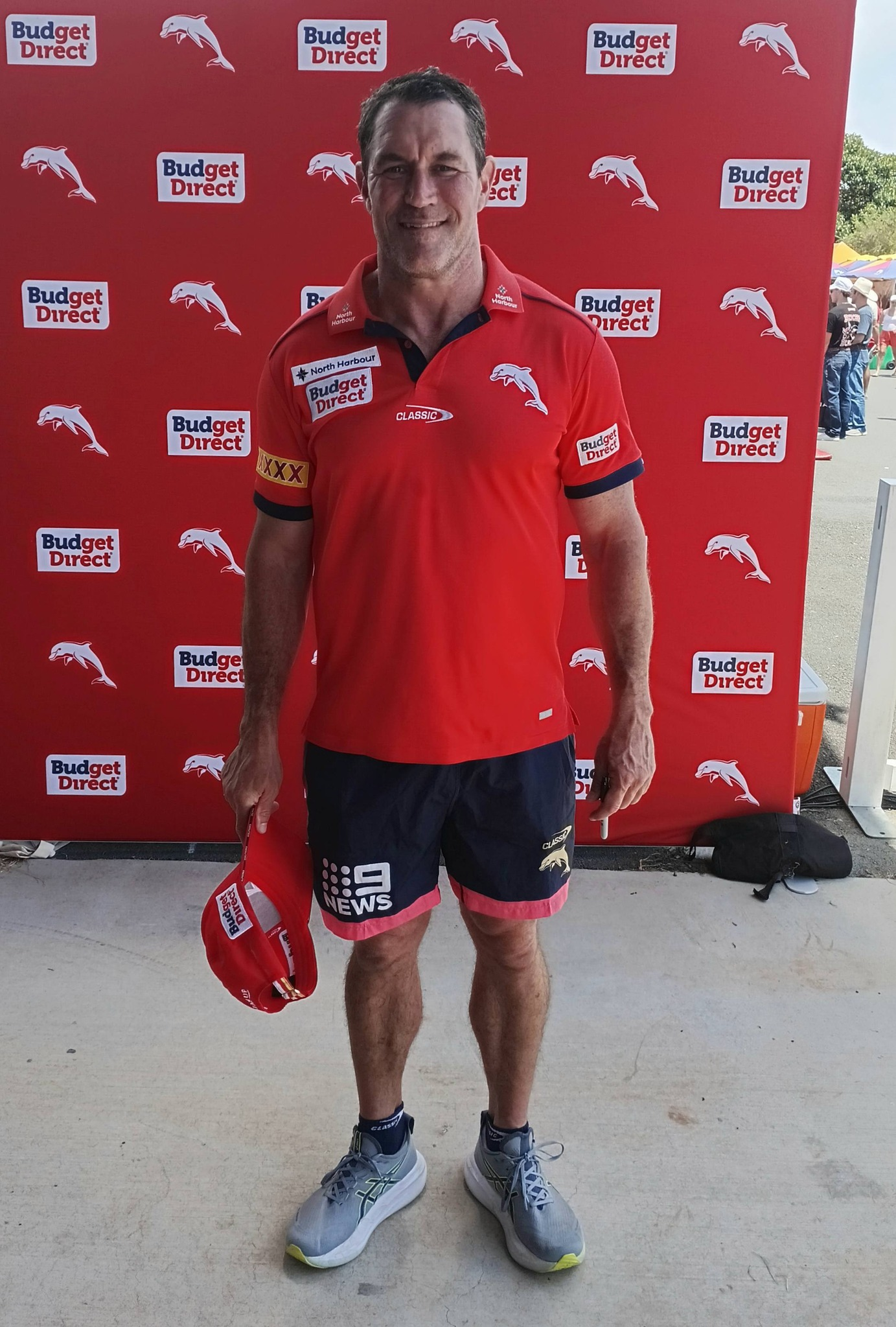
Dolphins NRL head coach Kristian Woolf

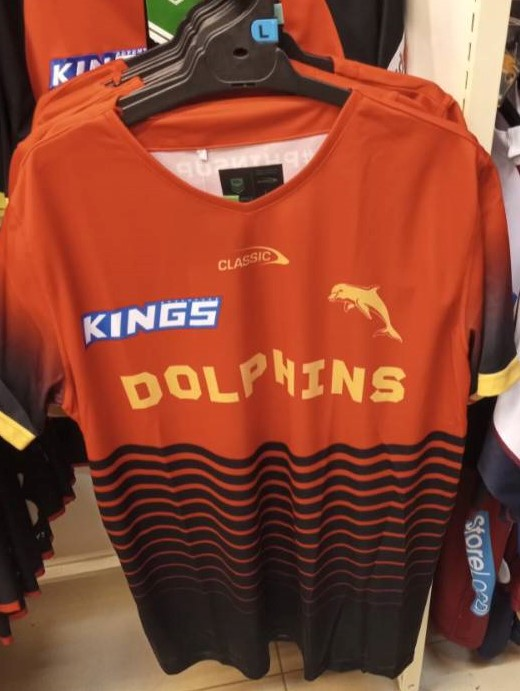
Dolphins NRL warm up tee shirt 2025

== Player movement ==
The following player movements happened across the previous season, off-season, pre-season and mid-season.

=== Gains ===
Player	Previous club	Length
Max Feagai	St. George Illawarra Dragons	2026
Kulikefu Finefeuiaki	North Queensland Cowboys	2027
Peter Hola	Norths Devils	2025
Francis Molo	St. George Illawarra Dragons	2026
Tevita Naufahu	Central Queensland Capras	2025
Daniel Saifiti	Newcastle Knights	2027
Tyreece Tait	Sydney Roosters (mid-season)	2027
Junior Tupou	Wests Tigers	2027
James Walsh	Redcliffe Dolphins	2026

=== Losses ===
Player	New Club
Euan Aitken	South Sydney Rabbitohs
Jesse Bromwich	Retired
Lachlan Hubner	South Sydney Rabbitohs
Edrick Lee	Retired
Tesi Niu	Leigh Leopards (Super League)
Tevita Pangai Junior	Catalans Dragons (Super League)
Junior Tupou	Sydney Roosters (mid-season)
Jarrod Wallace	Catalans Dragons (Super League)
Valynce Te Whare	Shizuoka Blue Revs (rugby union)

== Pre-season challenge ==
The Dolphins finished sixth in the 2025 NRL Pre-season Challenge played in February, prior to the commencement of the regular 2025 NRL season in March.

Game 1: 14 February 2025	North Queensland Cowboys	8–50	Dolphins	Cairns
19:00 AEST	Tries: Subloo 25'; Derby 55'; Goals: Subloo 0/1; Rivett 0/1	[Report Report]	Tries: Nonu 1', 7', 48'; Naufahu 16'; Bostock 22'; Tawha 22'; Waqa 29'; Averillo 37'; Teague 61'; Walsh 72'; Goals: O'Sullivan 5/7 3', 8', 24', 31', 38'; Stevanovic 2/2 63', 73'	Stadium: Barlow Park; Attendance: 6,936

Game 2: 22 February 2025	Dolphins	18–26	Gold Coast Titans	Redcliffe
18:30 AEST	Tries: Nicholls 23', 68'; Averillo 48'; Goals: Isaako 2/2 24', 50'; O'Sullivan 1/1 70'; Sin bin: Bromwich (yellow card) 53' to 63'	[Report Report]	Tries: Kini 8'; Brimson 15', 56'; Fermor 46'; Fifita 54'; Goals: Campbell 3/5 10', 17', 47'	Stadium: Kayo Stadium; Referee: Gerard Sutton

== Regular season ==
=== Ladder ===
Pos	Team	Pld	W	D	L	B	PF	PA	PD	Pts	Qualification
1	Canberra Raiders	24	19	0	5	3	654	506	+148	44	Advance to finals series
2	Melbourne Storm	24	17	0	7	3	671	459	+212	40	Advance to finals series
3	Canterbury-Bankstown Bulldogs	24	16	0	8	3	534	414	+120	38	Advance to finals series
4	Brisbane Broncos (P)	24	15	0	9	3	680	508	+172	36	Advance to finals series
5	Cronulla-Sutherland Sharks	24	15	0	9	3	599	490	+109	36	Advance to finals series
6	New Zealand Warriors	24	14	0	10	3	517	496	+21	34	Advance to finals series
7	Penrith Panthers	24	13	1	10	3	576	469	+107	33	Advance to finals series
8	Sydney Roosters	24	13	0	11	3	653	521	+132	32	Advance to finals series
9	Dolphins	24	12	0	12	3	721	596	+125	30	
10	Manly Warringah Sea Eagles	24	12	0	12	3	555	534	+21	30	
11	Parramatta Eels	24	10	0	14	3	502	578	−76	26	
12	North Queensland Cowboys	24	9	1	14	3	538	684	−146	25	
13	Wests Tigers	24	9	0	15	3	477	612	−135	24	
14	South Sydney Rabbitohs	24	9	0	15	3	427	608	−181	24	
15	St. George Illawarra Dragons	24	8	0	16	3	498	628	−130	22	
16	Gold Coast Titans	24	6	0	18	3	520	719	−199	18	
17	Newcastle Knights	24	6	0	18	3	338	638	−300	18	

Source: National Rugby League
(P) Premiers

=== Results by round ===
Round	1	2	3	4	5	6	7	8	9	10	11	12	13	14	15	16	17	18	19	20	21	22	23	24	25	26	27
Ground	A	A	H	H	A	H	H	A	A	A	H	A	–	H	A	H	H	–	A	H	–	A	H	A	A	H	H
Result	L	L	L	L	W	W	W	L	L	W	L	W	B	W	W	L	W	B	L	W	B	W	L	L	L	W	W
Position	10	15	15	16	14	14	10	12	14	12	14	13	10	7	6	9	8	7	10	9	8	8	8	9	9	9	9
Points	0	0	0	0	2	4	6	6	6	8	8	10	12	14	16	16	18	20	20	22	24	26	26	26	26	28	30

Source: National Rugby League
A = Away; H = Home; N = Neutral; B = Bye; W = Win; D = Draw; L = Loss

=== Matches ===
The league fixtures were released on 21 November 2024.

Win Draw Loss Fixtures

Round 1: 7 March 2025	South Sydney Rabbitohs	16–14	Dolphins	Parramatta
19:00 AEST (UTC+10:00)	Tries: Munro 10', 24'; Tass 67'; Goals: Humphreys 2/4 12', 25'	[Report Report]	Tries: Isaako 20', 47'; Plath 52'; Goals: Isaako 1/3 54'	Stadium: CommBank Stadium; Attendance: 6,738; Referee: Adam Gee

Round 2: 13 March 2025	Newcastle Knights	26–12	Dolphins	Newcastle
20:00 AEDT (UTC+11:00)	Tries: Schiller 9', 13'; Best 52'; Gagai 20'; Lucas 52'; Goals: Ponga 3/5 11', 29', 45'; Sin bin: Pearce-Paul (yellow card) 68' to 78'	[Report Report]	Tries: Nicholls 32'; Katoa 66'; Goals: Isaako 2/2 33', 67'	Stadium: McDonald Jones Stadium; Attendance: 18,531; Referee: Gerard Sutton

Round 3: 22 March 2025	Dolphins	18–30	Wests Tigers	Redcliffe
16:30 AEST (UTC+10:00)	Tries: Bostock 4'; Farnworth 17'; Nikorima 22'; Goals: Isaako 3/4 5', 19', 30 pen'	[Report Report]	Tries: Turuva 8', 63'; Da Silva 35'; Seyfarth 68'; Koroisau 75'; Goals: Doueihi 5/5 9', 37', 64', 70', 76'	Stadium: Kayo Stadium; Attendance: 10,023; Referee: Peter Gough

Round 4: 28 March 2025	Dolphins	12–20	Brisbane Broncos	Brisbane
19:00 AEST (UTC+10:00)	Tries: Plath 19'; Averillo 75'; Goals: Isaako 2/2 21', 76'	[Report Report]	Tries: Shibasaki 11', 55'; Paix 14'; Staggs 29'; Goals: Reynolds 2/4 16', 30'	Stadium: Suncorp Stadium; Attendance: 44,278; Referee: Gerard Sutton

Round 5: 5 April 2025	Gold Coast Titans	10–36	Dolphins	Gold Coast
16:30 AEST (UTC+10:00)	Tries: Sami 65'; Brimson 69'; Goals: Campbell 1/2 70'; Sin bin: Fa'asuamaleaui (yellow card) 1' to 11'	[Report Report]	Tries: Tabuai-Fidow 9'; Saifiti 24'; Plath 58'; Lemuelu 63'; Isaako 78'; Goals: Isaako 8/8 10', 19 pen', 25', 36 pen', 59', 64', 73 pen', 79'; Field goals: Isaako 0/1 (2 pt); Sin bin: Stone (yellow card) 30' to 40'	Stadium: Cbus Super Stadium; Attendance: 15,798; Referee: Wyatt Raymond

Round 6: 10 April 2025	Dolphins	30–12	Penrith Panthers	Brisbane
19:50 AEST (UTC+10:00)	Tries: Tabuai-Fidow 3', 22', 79'; Averillo 28'; Lemuelu 42'; Goals: Isaako 5/5 4', 23', 29', 44', 80'	[Report Report]	Tries: McLean 10'; Leota 72'; Goals: Cleary 2/2 12', 73'; Field goals: Cleary 0/1 (2 pt); Sin bin: Alamoti (yellow card) 25' to 35'	Stadium: Suncorp Stadium; Attendance: 19,103; Referee: Grant Atkins

Round 7: 18 April 2025	Dolphins	42–22	Melbourne Storm	Brisbane
20:00 AEST (UTC+10:00)	Tries: Kerr 28'; Bostock 36'; Stone 45', 59'; Lemuelu 51'; Nikorima 63'; Farnworth 71'; Goals: Isaako 7/8 4 pen', 29', 46', 53', 61', 65', 72'; Sin bin: Donoghoe (yellow card) 73' to 80'	[Report Report]	Tries: Bradley 9', 78'; Coates 12'; Papenhuyzen 20'; Goals: Papenhuyzen 5/5 10', 13', 79'; Sin bin: Loiero (yellow card) 73' to 80'	Stadium: Suncorp Stadium; Attendance: 28,024; Referee: Todd Smith

Round 8: 27 April 2025	Canberra Raiders	40–28	Dolphins	Canberra
14:00 AEST (UTC+10:00)	Tries: Tamale 9'; Weekes 30'; Hosking 49'; Strange 60'; Nicholson 65'; Kris 71'; Fogarty 78'; Goals: Fogarty 7/8 32', 51', 62', 66', 79', 80 pen'	[Report Report]	Tries: Tabuai-Fidow 13'; Farnworth 19'; Saifiti 26'; Isaako 34'; Averillo 39'; Goals: Isaako 4/5 15', 21', 28', 36'; Sin bin: Nikorima (yellow card) 7' to 17'	Stadium: GIO Stadium; Attendance: 15,686; Referee: Ashley Klein

Round 9 (Artie Match): 2 May 2025	Sydney Roosters	36–26	Dolphins	Brisbane
20:05 AEST (UTC+10:00)	Tries: Toia 10', 72'; Radley 16', 47'; Nawaqanitawase 21', 43'; Watson 49'; Goals: Savala 4/7 18', 44', 48', 51'	[Report Report]	Tries: Tabuai-Fidow 36', 66'; Farnworth 68'; Nikorima 75'; Goals: Isaako 5/5 38', 39 pen', 67', 69', 75'	Stadium: Suncorp Stadium; Attendance: 48,359; Referee: Grant Atkins

Round 10: 8 May 2025	Parramatta Eels	16–20	Dolphins	Parramatta
19:50 AEST	Tries: Simonsson 27'; Doorey 42'; Brown 72'; Goals: Russell 2/4 40 pen', 43'	[Report Report]	Tries: Bostock 11'; Lemuelu 60'; Farnworth 64'; Goals: Isaako 4/4 13', 61', 65', 70 pen'	Stadium: CommBank Stadium; Attendance: 11,214; Referee: Wyatt Raymond

Round 11: 17 May 2025	Dolphins	12–16	New Zealand Warriors	Brisbane
18:25 AEST (UTC+10:00)	Tries: Tabuai-Fidow 71'; Farnworth 77'; Goals: Isaako 2/2 72', 78'	[Report Report]	Tries: Niukore 28'; Capewell 35'; Laban 69'; Goals: Metcalf 2/3 36', 70'; Field goals: Metcalf 0/1 (2 pt); Sin bin: Fisher-Harris (yellow card) 76' to 80'	Stadium: Suncorp Stadium; Attendance: 32,165; Referee: Peter Gough

Round 12: 22 May 2025	Canterbury-Bankstown Bulldogs	8–44	Dolphins	Sydney
19:50 AEST	Tries: Hopoi 31'; Goals: Burton 2/2 9 pen', 32'	[Report Report]	Tries: Isaako 11'; Bostock 38'; Graham 46'; Farnworth 63'; Molo 73'; Averillo 76'; Donoghoe 78'; Goals: Isaako 8/9 13', 27 pen', 39', 47', 65', 74', 77', 79'	Stadium: Accor Stadium; Attendance: 10,412; Referee: Todd Smith

Round 13 (Bye for Dolphins)

Round 14: 6 June 2025	Dolphins	56–6	St. George Illawarra Dragons	Brisbane
20:00 AEST (UTC+10:00)	Tries: Farnworth 10', 79'; Isaako 13', 55'; Nikorima 20'; Lemuelu 29', 41'; Bostock 37'; Tabuai-Fidow 46', 58'; Goals: Isaako 8/10 15', 22', 31', 39', 43', 47', 59', 79'	[Report Report]	Tries: Holmes 63'; Goals: Holmes 1/2 2 pen'	Stadium: Suncorp Stadium; Attendance: 19,513; Referee: Adam Gee

Round 15: 14 June 2025	North Queensland Cowboys	4–58	Dolphins	Townsville
19:35 AEST (UTC+10:00)	Tries: Taulagi 63'; Goals: Drinkwater 0/1	[Report Report]	Tries: Bostock 3', 14', 43', 69'; Keeley 21'; Donoghoe 39'; Averillo 51'; Farnworth 65'; Stone 72'; Nikorima 77'; Goals: Isaako 9/10 16', 22', 39', 44', 53', 66', 71', 73', 77'; Sin bin: Kaufusi (yellow card) 11' to 21'	Stadium: Queensland Country Bank Stadium; Attendance: 18,343; Referee: Todd Smith

Round 16: 21 June 2025	Dolphins	20–26	Newcastle Knights	Perth
15:30 AWST (UTC+08:00)	Tries: Nikorima 10'; Lemuelu 31'; Isaako 53'; Tabuai-Fidow 59'; Goals: Isaako 2/4 32', 61'	[Report Report]	Tries: Sharpe 4'; Best 18', 63'; Young 24'; Jones 78'; Goals: Gagai 3/5 5', 19', 79'; Sin bin: Gagai (yellow card) 50' to 60'	Stadium: HBF Park; Attendance: 10,077; Referee: Grant Atkins

Round 17: 28 June 2025	Dolphins	50–28	South Sydney Rabbitohs	Brisbane
19:50 AEST (UTC+10:00)		[Report Report]		Stadium: Suncorp Stadium

Round 18 (Bye for Dolphins)

Round 19: 11 July 2025	Cronulla-Sutherland Sharks	24–12	Dolphins	Cronulla
20:00 AEST (UTC+10:00)		[Report Report]		Stadium: Sharks Stadium

Round 20: 17 July 2025	Dolphins	43–24	North Queensland Cowboys	Brisbane
16:05 AEST (UTC+10:00)		[Report Report]		Stadium: Suncorp Stadium

Round 21 (Bye for Dolphins)

Round 22: 1 August 2025	New Zealand Warriors	18–20	Dolphins	Auckland
20:00 NZST	Tries: Watene-Zelezniak 9', 35'; Halasima 58'; Goals: Boyd 3/3 10', 37', 60'	[Report Report]	Tries: Farnworth 4'; Marshall-King 25'; Keeley 29'; Isaako 78'; Goals: Isaako 2/4 5', 26'	Stadium: Go Media Stadium; Attendance: 23,012; Referee: Ashley Klein

Round 23: 9 August 2024	Dolphins	12–64	Sydney Roosters	Brisbane
17:30 AEST (UTC+10:00)		[Report Report]		Stadium: Suncorp Stadium

Round 24: 16 August 2025	Brisbane Broncos	28–38	Dolphins	Brisbane
17:30 AEST (UTC+10:00)		[Report Report]		Stadium: Suncorp Stadium

Round 25: 23 August 2025	Manly Warringah Sea Eagles	58–30	Dolphins	Sydney
15:00 AEST (UTC+10:00)		[Report Report]		Stadium: 4 Pines Park

Round 26: 31 August 2025	Dolphins	36–30	Gold Coast Titans	Brisbane
16:05 AEST (UTC+10:00)		[Report Report]		Stadium: Suncorp Stadium

Round 27: 7 September 2025	Dolphins	62–24	Canberra Raiders	Redcliffe
14:00 AEST (UTC+10:00)		[Report Report]		Stadium: Kayo Stadium

== 2025 Squad ==
Dolphins 2026 squad
Top 30 squad – 2026 NRL season			Supplementary list	Coaching staff
Jake Averillo – CE; Jack Bostock – CE; Selwyn Cobbo – WG; Kurt Donoghoe – HK; Herbie Farnworth – CE; Kulikefu Finefeuiaki – SR; Thomas Flegler – PR; Trai Fuller – FB; Tom Gilbert (c) – PR; Jamayne Isaako – WG	Isaiya Katoa (c) – HB; Felise Kaufusi (vc) – PR; Oryn Keeley – SR; Morgan Knowles – LK; Connelly Lemuelu – SR; Jeremy Marshall-King – HK; Francis Molo – PR; Tevita Naufahu – WG; Kodi Nikorima – FE; LJ Nonu – WG	Max Plath – HK; Brian Pouniu – CE; Elijah Rasmussen – PR; Brad Schneider – FE, HK; Ray Stone – LK; Sebastian Su'a – PR; Hamiso Tabuai-Fidow – FB	Charlie Dickson – LK; John Fineanganofo – HK; Zac Garton – SR; Patrick Kailahi – SR; Lewis Symonds – LK; Extended squad: Brent Woolf – HK; Tyreece Tait – WG	Head coach: Kristian Woolf; Assistant coaches: Nathan Fien; Rory Kostjasyn; Ben Woolf; Jeremy Hickmans (Head of Performance); Blake Duncan (Athletic Performance Coach); Elliot Jackson (Athletic Performance Coach); Medical professionals: Adam Schumacher (Physiotherapist); John Davey (Head of Sports Science & Performance Analysis); Legend: (c) Captain(s); (vc) Vice-captain(s); Development players; Extended squad; Updated: 1 August 2026; Source(s):
