= List of Dolphins (NRL) records =

The Dolphins are a professional rugby league football team based in the Redcliffe Peninsula area of the City of Moreton Bay, which is part of the greater Brisbane area of South East Queensland, Australia. They compete in the Australian National Rugby League (NRL), and this list of Dolphins' records since entering the NRL in 2023 is correct as of the conclusion of the 2026 season.

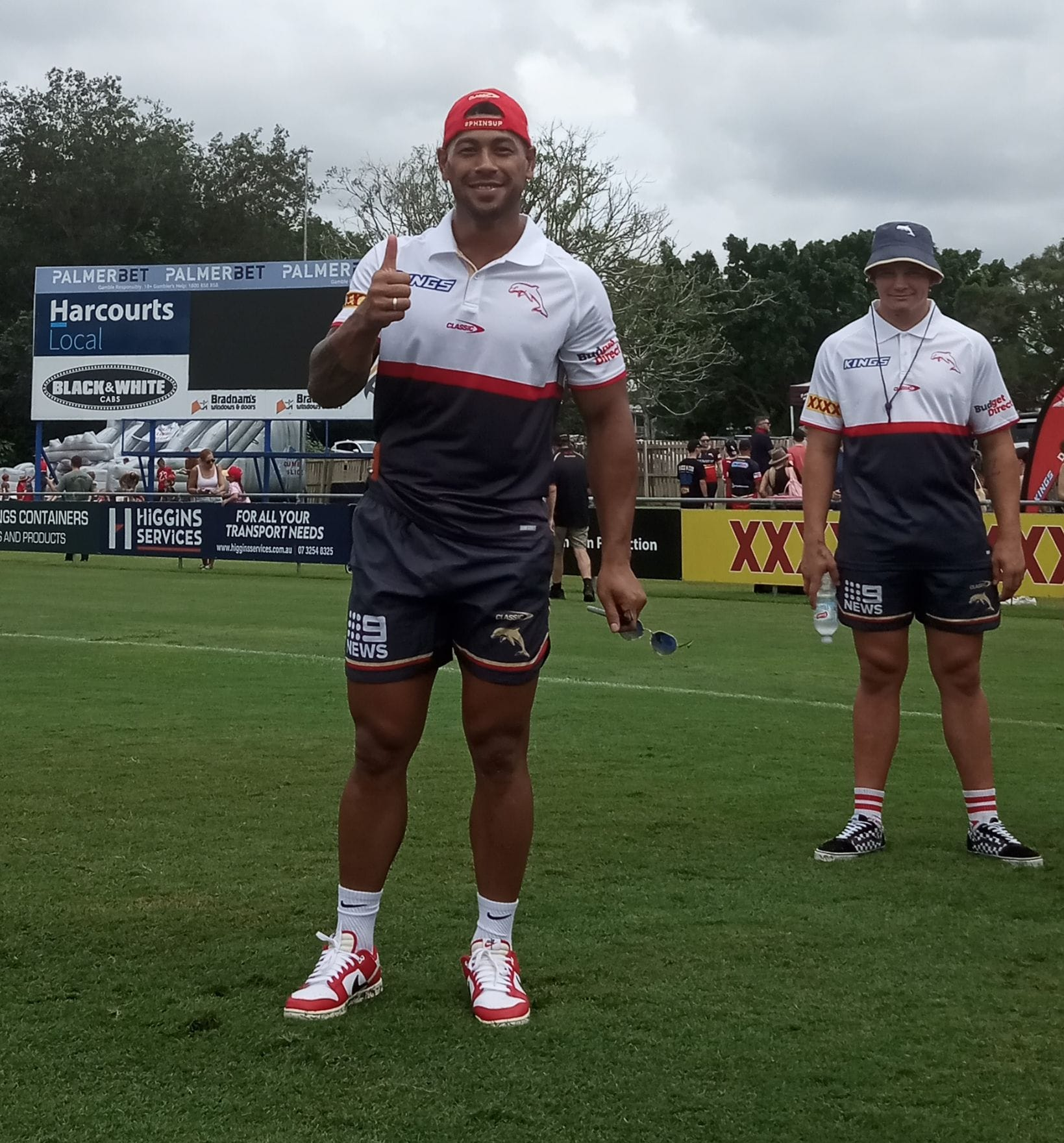
Jamayne Isaako

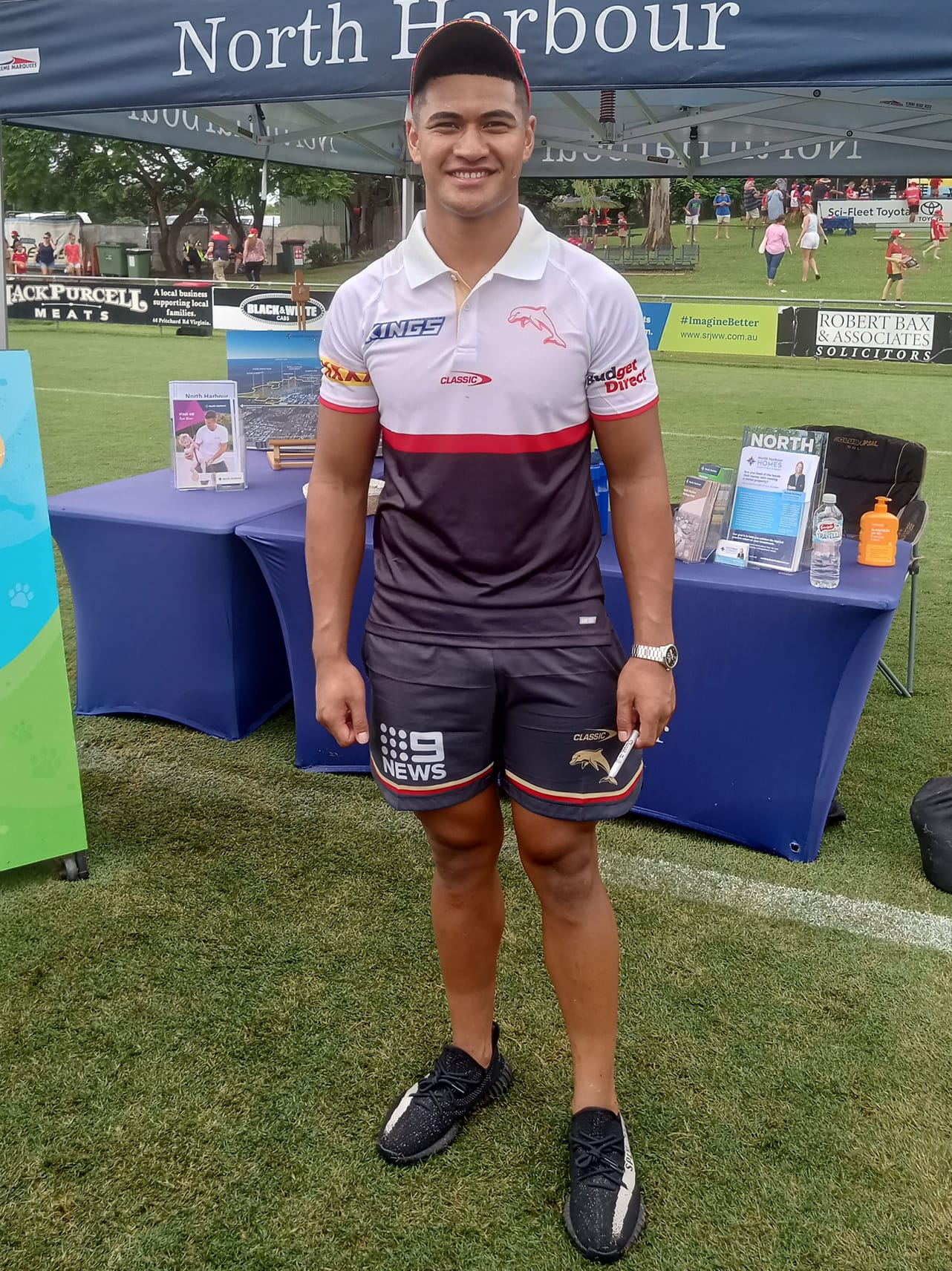
Isaiya Katoa

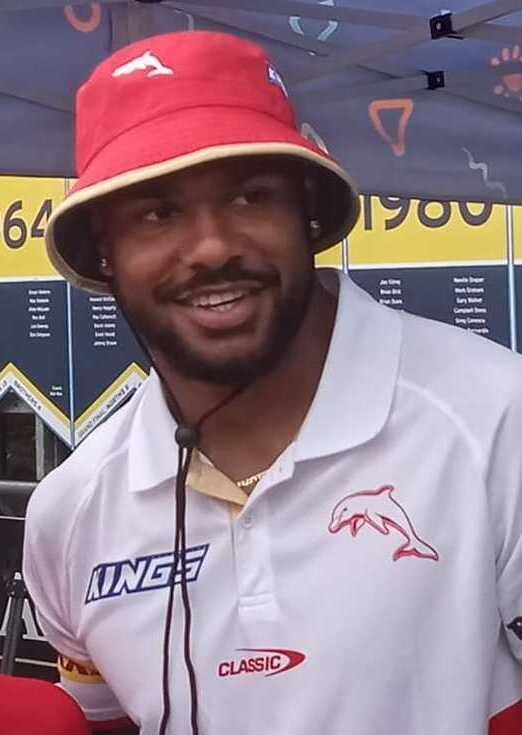
Hamiso Tabuai-Fidow

== Individual records ==
=== Most first-grade Dolphins games ===
This list refers to the most first-grade games played for the Dolphins, not the combined total number of games played for all or other clubs in the NRL.

Games	Dolphin	Years
98	Jamayne Isaako	2023–2026
90	Isaiya Katoa	2023–
85	Connelly Lemuelu	2023–
84	Kodi Nikorima	2023–2026
82	Ray Stone	2023–2026
78	Hamiso Tabuai-Fidow	2023–
69	Felise Kaufusi	2023–
69	Jeremy Marshall-King	2023–
66	Mark Nicholls	2023–2025
64	Herbie Farnworth	2024–

=== Most points for the club ===
Points	Dolphin	Tries	Goals	Field goals
1,055	Jamayne Isaako	70	386	3
264	Hamiso Tabuai-Fidow	66	0	0
140	Herbie Farnworth	35	0	0
124	Jack Bostock	31	0	0
112	Jake Averillo	28	0	0

By the end of the Dolphins' inaugural season, goal-kicking winger Jamayne Isaako recorded both the highest number of NRL tries and highest number of points in the 2023 competition, a feat last achieved in 1990 by Mal Meninga of the Canberra Raiders. Isaako was also the top pointscorer in the 2025 NRL season.

In round 24 of the 2026 NRL season, Jamayne Isaako scored 1000 club points in the fewest NRL games (93); this broke the 1981 record (98) of Michael Cronin (Parramatta Eels).

=== Most tries for the club ===
Tries	Dolphin
70	Jamayne Isaako
66	Hamiso Tabuai-Fidow
35	Herbie Farnworth
31	Jack Bostock
28	Jake Averillo

=== Most tries in a match ===
- 4 - Jack Bostock v North Queensland Cowboys, Rounds 15 2025. (Dolphins won 58–4)
- 4 - Hamiso Tabuai-Fidow v South Sydney Rabbitohs, Round 17 2025. (Dolphins won 50–28)

=== Longest try-scoring streak ===
- 8 games: Herbie Farnworth - Rounds 7–15, 2025

=== Most points in a match ===
In the 'Score' column, the Dolphins' score is shown first.

Points	Dolphin	Opponent	Venue	Round	Season	Dolphins' score
24 (2 tries, 8 goals)	Jamayne Isaako	St. George Illawarra Dragons	Suncorp Stadium	14	2025	56–6
24 (3 tries, 6 goals)	Jamayne Isaako	Canterbury-Bankstown Bulldogs	Suncorp Stadium	10	2026	44–12

=== Most goals in a match ===
In the 'Score' column, the Dolphins' score is shown first.

Goals	Dolphin	Opponent	Venue	Round	Season	Dolphins' score
9	Jamayne Isaako	North Queensland Cowboys	Queensland Country Bank Stadium	15	2025	58–4
9	Jamayne Isaako	South Sydney Rabbitohs	Suncorp Stadium	17	2025	50–28

=== Most tries in a season ===
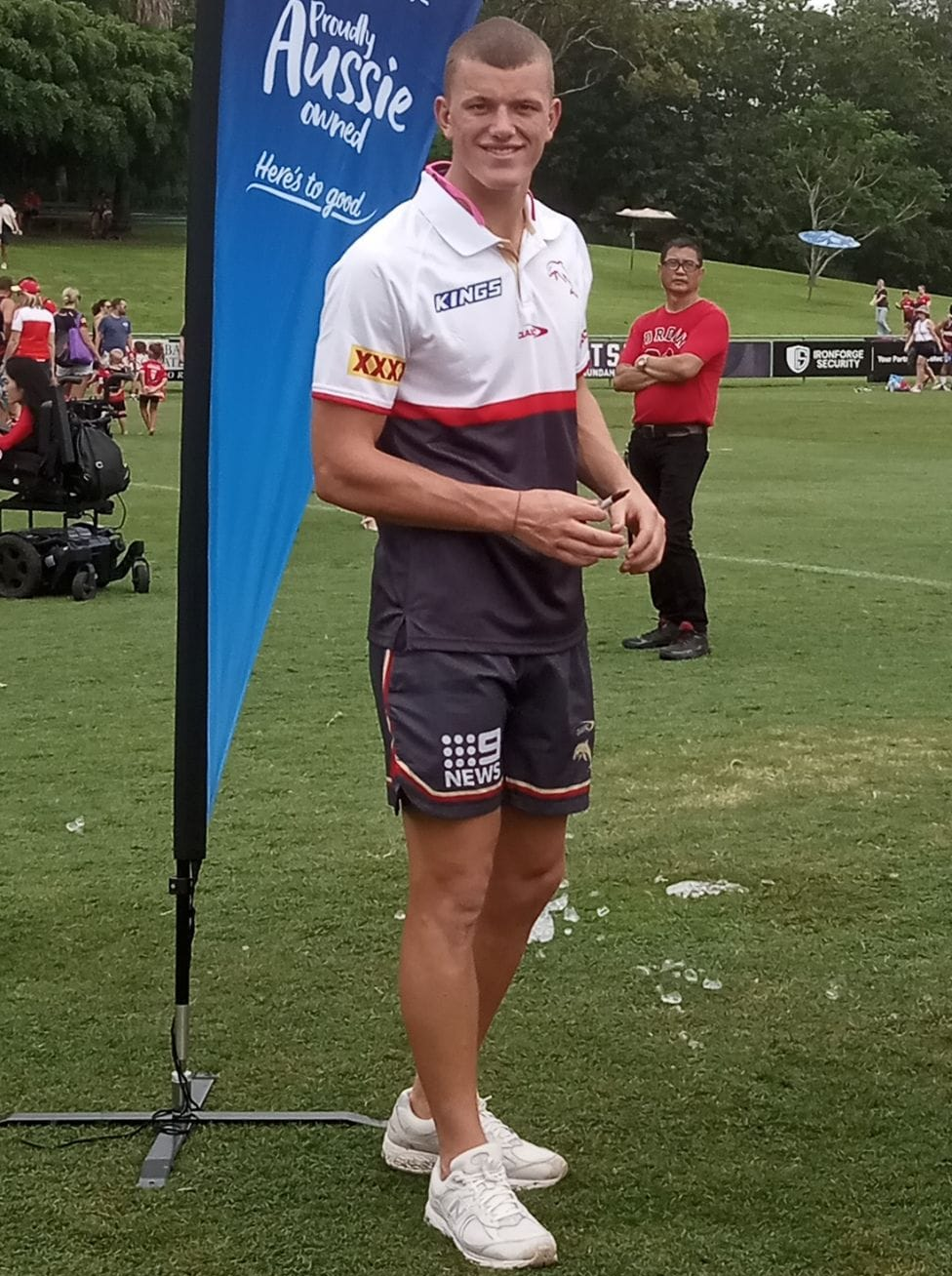
Jack Bostock

Season	Dolphin	Tries
2023	Jamayne Isaako	24
2024	Jack Bostock	14
2024	Hamiso Tabuai-Fidow	14
2025	Hamiso Tabuai-Fidow	22
2026	Jamayne Isaako	23

=== Most goals in a season ===
Season	Dolphin	Goals	Field goals
2023	Jamayne Isaako	73	2
2024	Jamayne Isaako	86	1
2025	Jamayne Isaako	117	0
2026	Jamayne Isaako	109	0

=== Most points in a season ===
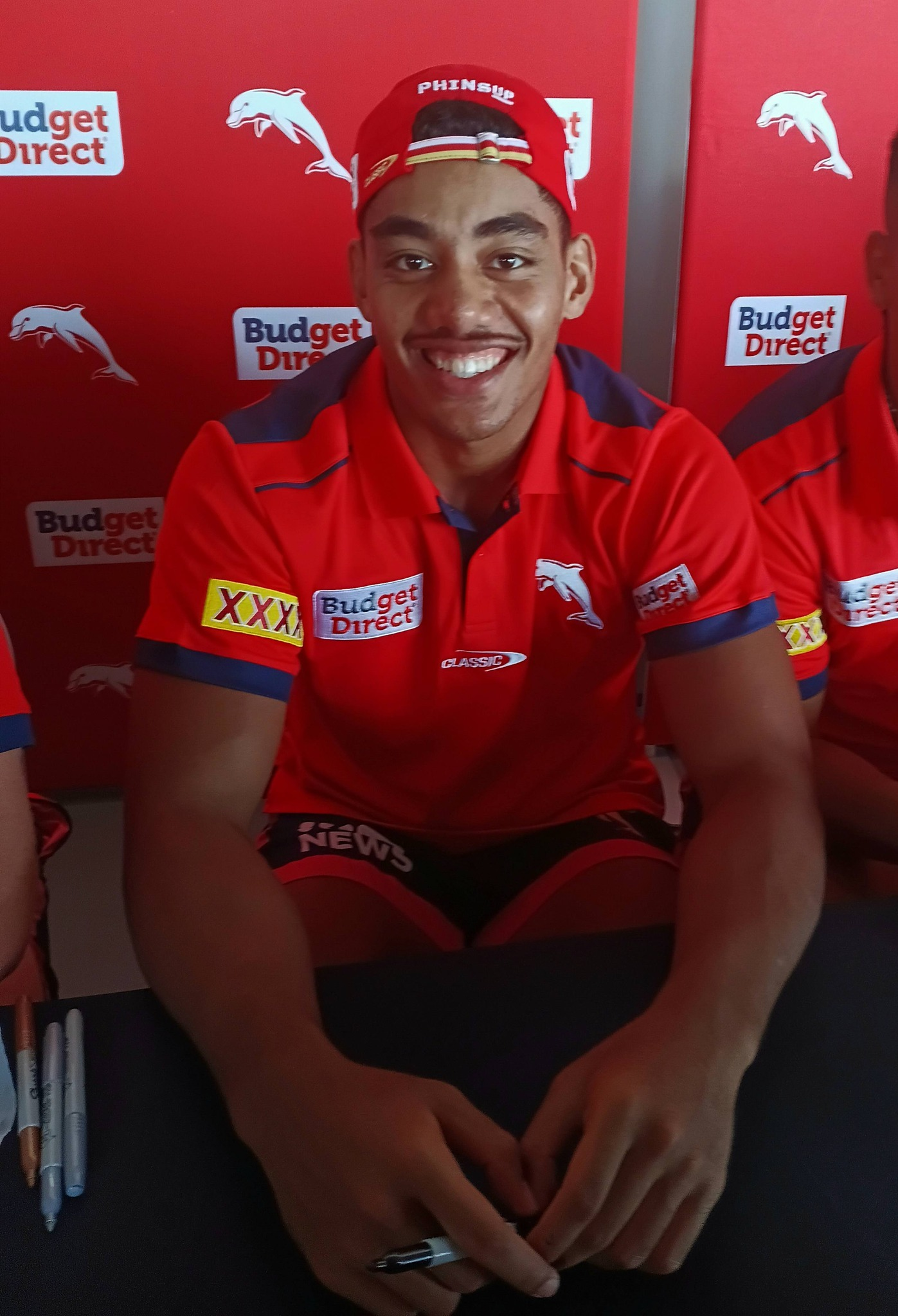
Brian Pouniu - youngest player to debut for the Dolphins @ Rd 12 2026

Season	Dolphin	Points
2023	Jamayne Isaako	244
2024	Jamayne Isaako	221
2025	Jamayne Isaako	278
2026	Jamayne Isaako	310

=== Youngest players to debut ===
Debut refers to first NRL appearance for the Dolphins, which may not necessarily be the player's first-ever NRL game.

Date of birth & current age	Age on debut for the Dolphins	Player's name	Season	Debut round
11 October 2007 (age 19)	18 years & 222 days	Brian Pouniu	2026	Round 12
18 February 2004 (age 22)	19 years & 15 days	Isaiya Katoa	2023	Round 1
28 August 2003 (age 23)	19 years & 216 days	Jack Bostock	2023	Round 5
13 July 2003 (age 23)	19 years & 241 days	Mason Teague	2023	Round 2
7 November 2005 (age 21)	19 years & 246 days	Tevita Naufahu	2025	Round 19

=== Oldest players ===
Date of birth & current age	Player's name	Age at last game	Season	Last round
5 January 1990 (age 36)	Mark Nicholls	35 years & 245 days	2025	Round 27
3 May 1989 (age 37)	Jesse Bromwich	35 years & 128 days	2024	Round 27
19 May 1992 (age 34)	Felise Kaufusi	34 years & 94 days	2026	Round 25
22 September 1991 (age 35)	Kenny Bromwich	33 years & 217 days	2025	Round 8
23 July 1991 (age 35)	Jarrod Wallace	32 years & 264 days	2024	Round 6

== Team records ==
In round 15 of the 2024 NRL season, the Dolphins achieved their first ever win in Sydney when they defeated the Cronulla-Sutherland Sharks 30-28 at PointsBet Stadium. After three previous defeats by the Brisbane Broncos, the Dolphins won their first Battle for Brisbane derby 40-6 in round 26 on 31 August 2024 at Suncorp Stadium.

In round 12 of the 2025 NRL season at Accor Stadium, the Dolphins achieved their first ever victory over the Canterbury-Bankstown Bulldogs. Consequently, the Dolphins had recorded wins against every team since entering the NRL competition in 2023.

=== Biggest wins ===
In the 'Score' column, the Dolphins' winning score is shown first.

Margin	Opponent	Score	Venue	Round	Date
54	North Queensland Cowboys	58–4	Queensland Country Bank Stadium	15	14 June 2025
50	St. George Illawarra Dragons	56–6	Suncorp Stadium	14	6 June 2025
38	St. George Illawarra Dragons	38–0	Kayo Stadium	2	17 March 2024
38	Canberra Raiders	62–24	Kayo Stadium	27	7 September 2025
38	Sydney Roosters	48–10	Suncorp Stadium	15	12 June 2026

=== Biggest losses ===
In the 'Score' column, the opponent's winning score is shown first.

Margin	Opponent	Score	Venue	Round	Date
66	Cronulla-Sutherland Sharks	66–0	Kayo Stadium	19	11 July 2026
52	Sydney Roosters	64–12	Suncorp Stadium	23	9 August 2025
42	Melbourne Storm	48–6	AAMI Park	25	24 August 2024
40	Manly Warringah Sea Eagles	58–18	4 Pines Park	15	9 June 2023
34	Manly Warringah Sea Eagles	52–18	Kayo Stadium	5	2 April 2026

=== Golden point results ===
Played	Won	Drawn	Lost
6	2	0	4

Opponent	Score	Dolphins	Date	Venue
Canberra Raiders	31–30	Loss	29 April 2023	McDonalds Park
Gold Coast Titans	21–23	Win	9 July 2023	Cbus Super Stadium
Canberra Raiders	26–25	Loss	1 June 2024	Kayo Stadium
Penrith Panthers	28–26	Loss	21 July 2024	BlueBet Stadium
New Zealand Warriors	32–34	Win	11 August 2024	Suncorp Stadium
Penrith Panthers	22–23	Loss	17 April 2026	TIO Stadium

== All-time premiership record ==
=== Regular season ===
Season	Games	Won	Drawn	Lost	Win %	Points for	Points against	Points differential
2023	24	9	0	15	37.5%	520	631	-111
2024	24	11	0	13	45.8%	577	578	-1
2025	24	12	0	12	50.0%	721	596	+125
2026	26	18	0	8	69.2%	708	558	+150
Totals	98	50	0	48	51.02%	2,526	2,363	+163

=== Performance against current NRL clubs ===
Win %	Opposition	Games	Wins	Losses	Points for	Points against	PD	Biggest win	Biggest loss
87.50%	Gold Coast Titans	8	7	1	209	156	+53	36–10	14–21
75.00%	North Queensland Cowboys	8	6	2	265	183	+82	58–4	18–43
75.00%	Parramatta Eels	4	3	1	118	96	+22	44–16	20–48
66.67%	St. George Illawarra Dragons	6	4	2	166	104	+62	56–6	12–38
60.00%	Wests Tigers	5	3	2	127	104	+23	36–22	18–30
60.00%	Cronulla-Sutherland Sharks	5	3	2	116	144	-28	38–10	0–66
55.56%	New Zealand Warriors	9	5	4	198	190	+8	34–10	8–30
50.00%	Canterbury-Bankstown Bulldogs	4	2	2	120	73	+47	44–8	10–30
50.00%	Canberra Raiders	6	3	3	195	157	+38	62–24	28–40
50.00%	South Sydney Rabbitohs	6	3	3	176	158	+26	50–28	14–36
50.00%	South Sydney Rabbitohs	6	3	3	176	158	+26	32–10	14–36
40.00%	Melbourne Storm	5	2	3	116	134	-18	42–22	6–48
40.00%	Manly Warringah Sea Eagles	5	2	3	118	192	-74	22–0	18–58
37.50%	Sydney Roosters	8	3	5	208	246	-38	48–10	12–64
25.00%	Penrith Panthers	4	1	3	92	87	+5	30–12	14–24
25.00%	Brisbane Broncos	8	2	6	174	192	-18	40–6	14–28
25.00%	Brisbane Broncos	8	2	6	174	192	-18	40–6	12–26
14.29%	Newcastle Knights	7	1	6	128	147	-19	36–20	12–26
00.00%	Perth Bears	0	0	0	0	0	+0	–	–

== Streaks ==
=== Most consecutive wins ===
- 8 : (Rounds 9–17) 1 May–27 June 2026
- 8 : (Rounds 20–Finals Week 1) 19 July–12 September 2026

=== Most consecutive losses ===
- 6 : (Rounds 20–26) 16 July–25 August 2023

== Comebacks ==
=== Biggest comebacks ===
Opponent	Venue	Round	Season	Date	Dolphins' score
Gold Coast Titans	Suncorp Stadium	8	2023	23 April	28–26 (Full-time)

- The Dolphins trailed 0–26 after 33 minutes but came back and won 28–26.

Opponent	Venue	Round	Season	Date	Dolphins' score
Brisbane Broncos	Suncorp Stadium	23	2026	8 August	40–32 (Full-time)

- The Dolphins trailed 0–24 after 24 minutes but came back and won 40–32.

== Crowds ==
=== Biggest home venue attendances ===
Crowd	Venue	Opponent	Round	Season
52,286	Suncorp Stadium	Sydney Roosters	Finals Week 3	2026
51,047	Suncorp Stadium	Brisbane Broncos	4	2023
50,188	Suncorp Stadium	Brisbane Broncos	23	2026
50,049	Suncorp Stadium	Brisbane Broncos	26	2024
44,278	Suncorp Stadium	Brisbane Broncos	4	2025

== Honours ==
=== Captains ===
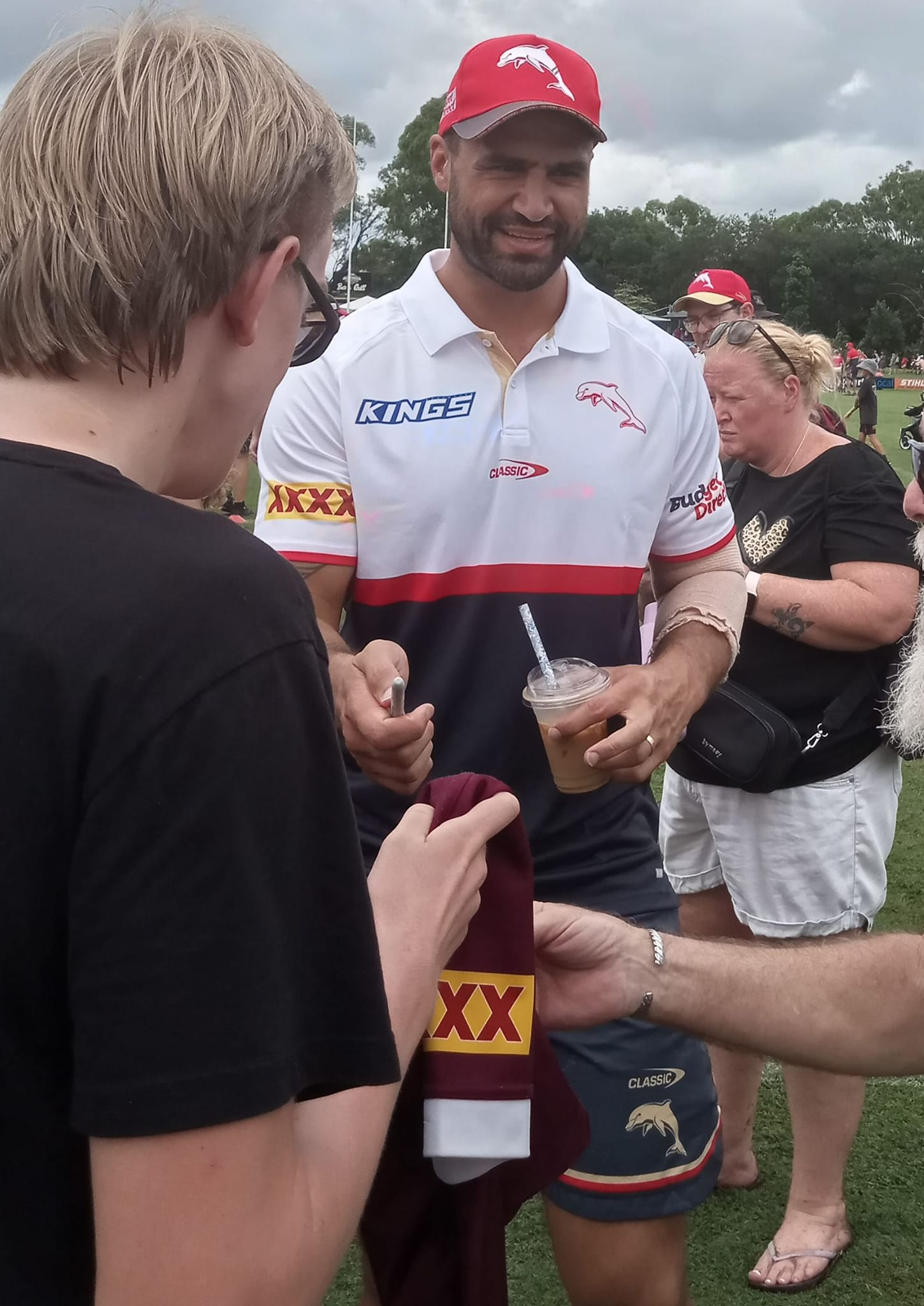
Dolphins NRL inaugural team captain Jesse Bromwich

This is the complete list of all players who have captained the Dolphins Rugby League club in an NRL game since 2023. Order is dictated by the year and round in which each player first captained the team. Italicised players were on-field substitutes for an absent club captain.

#	Name	First game as captain	Last game as captain	Total games as captain
1	Jesse Bromwich	Round 1 2023	Round 27 2024	42
2	Mark Nicholls	Round 6 2023	Round 26 2024	2
3	Felise Kaufusi	Round 10 2023	Round 18 2026	12 (Note: Includes 4 games as co-captain with Isaiya Katoa and 1 with Tom Gilbert.)
4	Kodi Nikorima	Round 15 2024	Round 20 2026	2 (Note: Includes 1 game as co-captain with Tom Gilbert.)
5	Tom Gilbert	Round 1 2025	Finals Week 3 2026	36 (Note: Includes 22 games as co-captain with Isaiya Katoa, 1 with Felise Kaufusi, and 1 with Kodi Nikorima.)
6	Isaiya Katoa	Round 16 2025 (Note: As acting captain, official club captain from Round 1 2026.)	Finals Week 3 2026	32 (Note: Includes 4 games as co-captain with Felise Kaufusi & 22 games as co-captain with Tom Gilbert.)

=== Coaches ===
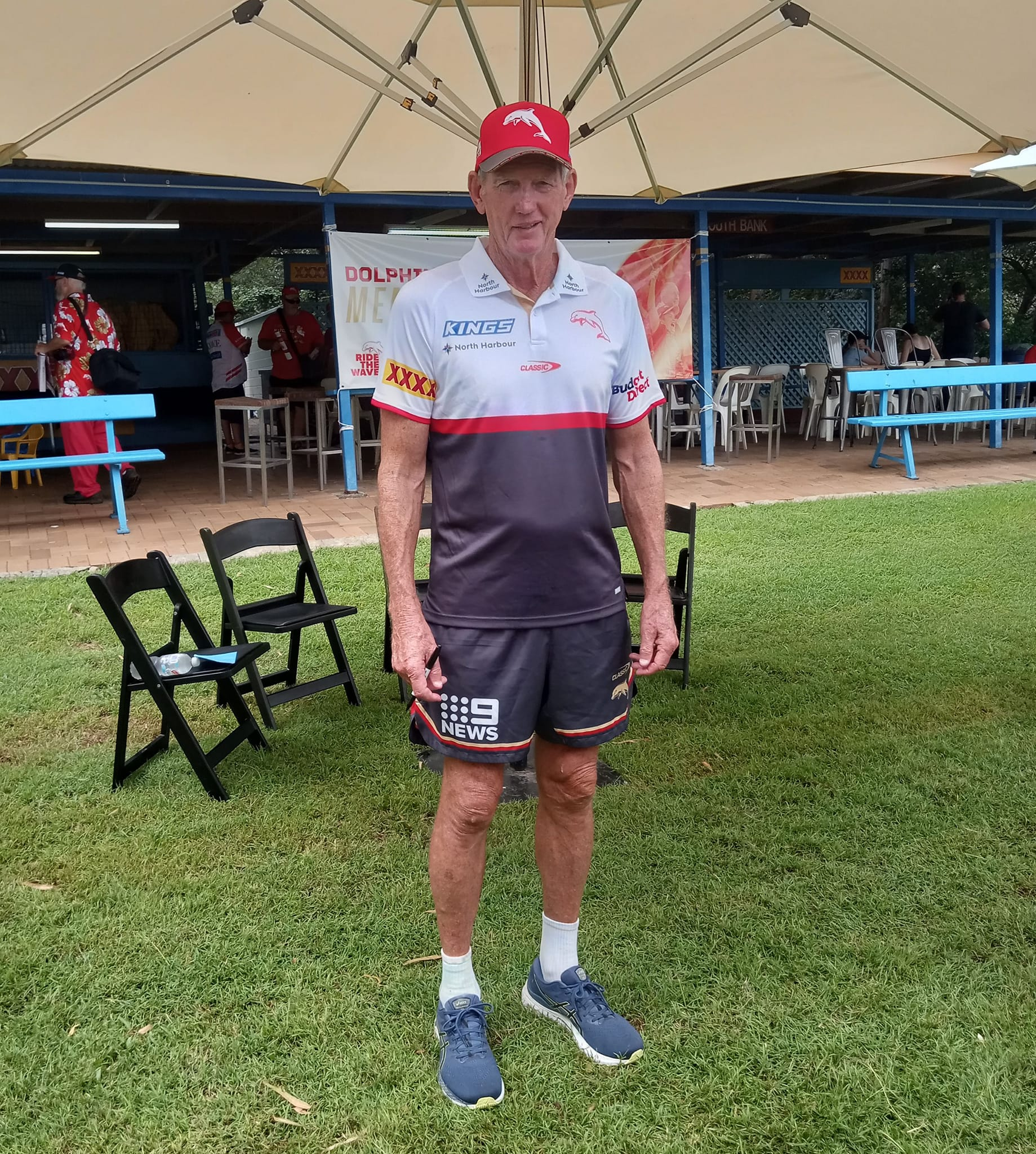
Dolphins NRL inaugural head coach Wayne Bennett

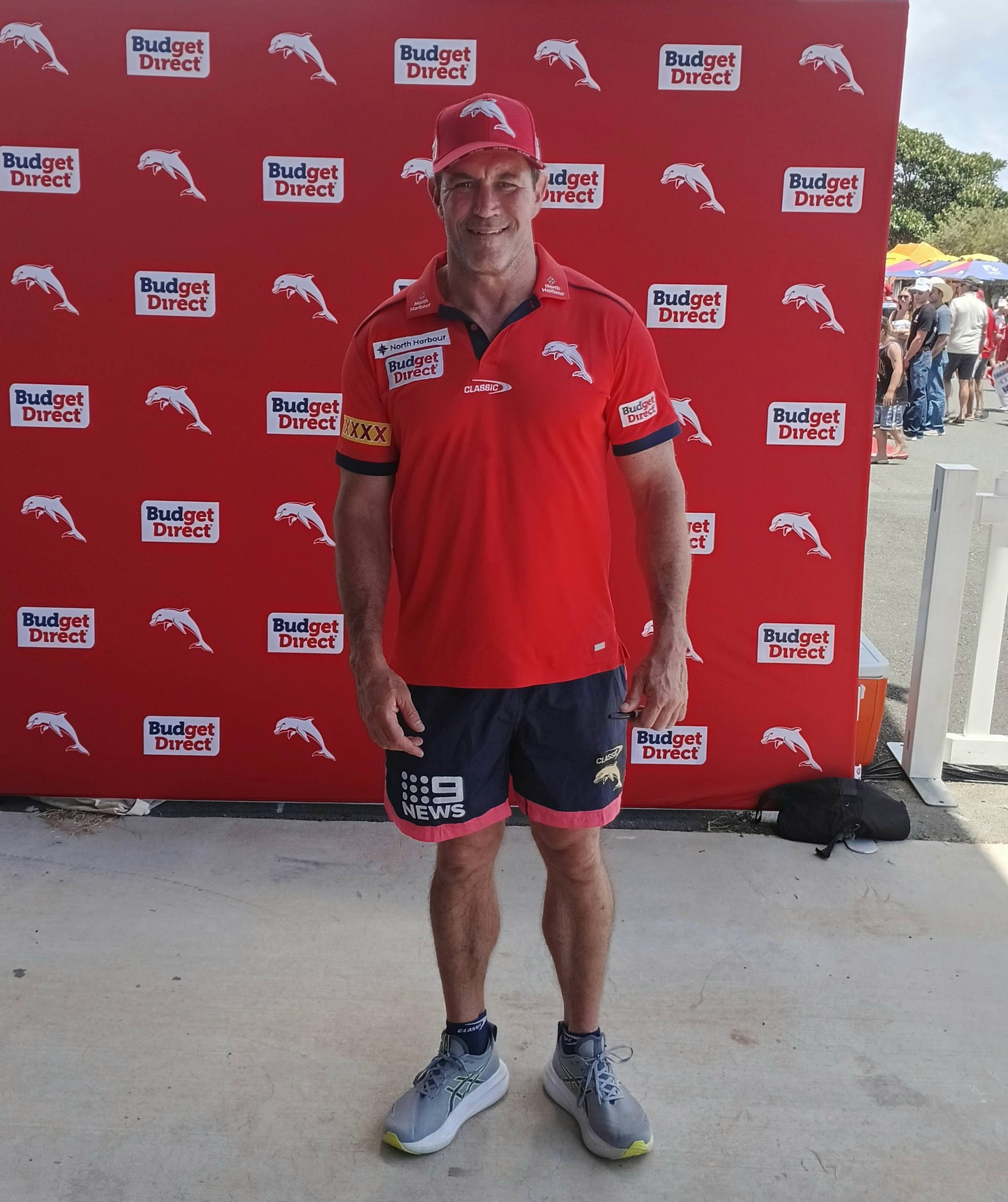
Kristian Woolf

Name	Seasons	Games	Wins	Losses	Draws	Win %
Wayne Bennett	2023–2024	48	20	28	0	41.67%
Kristian Woolf	2025–	50	30	20	0	60.00%

=== Dolphins Player of the Year Awards ===
==== Arthur Beetson Medal (Player of the Year) ====
- 2023 – Jamayne Isaako
- 2024 – Max Plath
- 2025 – Herbie Farnworth
- 2026 – Herbie Farnworth

==== Fan-Voted MVP ====
- 2023 – Hamiso Tabuai-Fidow
- 2024 – Hamiso Tabuai-Fidow
- 2025 – Herbie Farnworth
- 2026 – Selwyn Cobbo

==== Academic Award ====
- 2023 – Euan Aitken
- 2024 – Tom Gilbert
- 2025 – Sean O'Sullivan
- 2026 – Max Plath

==== Rookie of the Year ====
- 2023 – Isaiya Katoa
- 2024 – Jack Bostock
- 2025 – Tevita Naufahu
- 2026 – Brian Pouniu

==== Best Back ====
- 2023 – Jamayne Isaako
- 2024 – Herbie Farnworth
- 2025 – Isaiya Katoa
- 2026 – Herbie Farnworth

==== Best Forward ====
- 2023 – Mark Nicholls
- 2024 – Max Plath
- 2025 – Kurt Donoghoe
- 2026 – Max Plath

==== Most Consistent ====
- 2023 – Jamayne Isaako
- 2024 – Mark Nicholls
- 2025 – Kurt Donoghoe
- 2026 – Isaiya Katoa

==== Jesse Bromwich Award (Players' Player) ====
- 2023 – Jamayne Isaako
- 2024 – Max Plath
- 2025 – Isaiya Katoa
- 2026 – Herbie Farnworth

==== Club Person of the Year ====
- 2023 – Shane Morris
- 2024 – Natalie Campbell
- 2025 – Sam Tagataese
- 2026 – Abbey Cleary

== See also ==
- List of Dolphins players
- Dolphins (NRL) seasons: 2023, 2024, 2025, 2026
