= Kulikefu Finefeuiaki =

Tonga international rugby league footballer

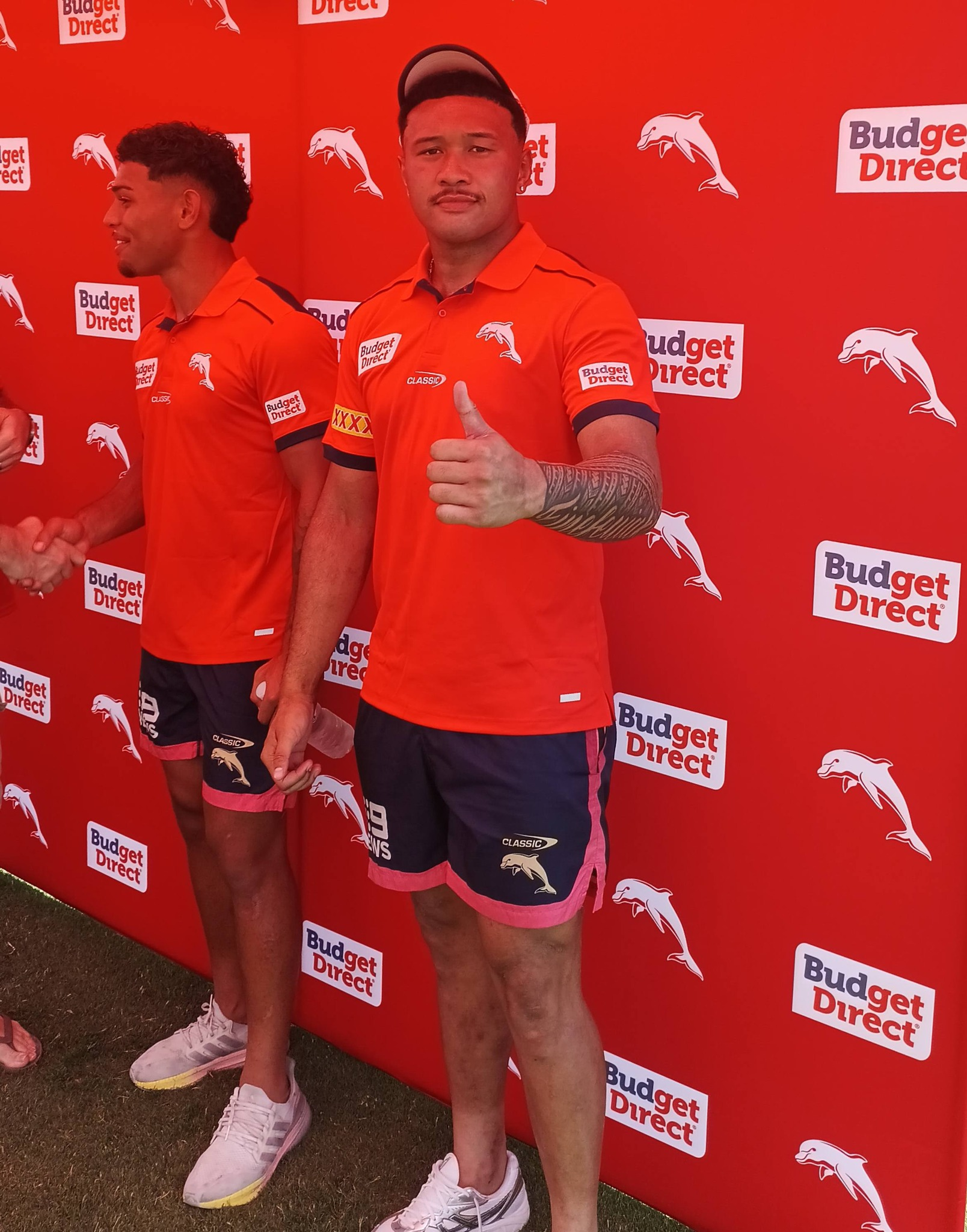
- Tevita Naufahu (L) & Kulikefu Finefeuiaki (R)

Personal information
- Full name: Kulikefu Finefeuiaki
- Born: 21 December 2003 (age 22) Auckland, New Zealand
- Height: 190 cm (6 ft 3 in)
- Weight: 105 kg (16 st 7 lb)

Playing information
- Position: Second-row
Club
Years	Team	Pld	T	G	FG	P
2023–24	North Qld Cowboys	37	5	0	0	20
2025–	Dolphins	44	5	0	0	20
	Total	81	10	0	0	40
Representative
Years	Team	Pld	T	G	FG	P
2025–	Tonga	3	0	0	0	0
2026	Queensland	1	0	0	0	0
- Source: As of 20 November 2026

Kulikefu Finefeuiaki (born 21 December 2003) is a Tonga international rugby league footballer from New Zealand who plays as a second-row forward for the Dolphins in the National Rugby League (NRL).

He previously played for the North Queensland Cowboys.

== Background ==
Finefeuiaki was born in Auckland and is of Tongan and Samoan descent. He attended Kelston Primary School in New Zealand before moving to Ipswich, Queensland with his family at age eleven.

In Ipswich, he played junior rugby league for the Redbank Plains Bears and attended Ipswich State High School before being signed by the North Queensland Cowboys.

== Playing career ==
=== Early career ===
In 2020 and 2021, Finefeuiaki played for the Ipswich Jets in the Mal Meninga Cup.

In 2022, he moved to Townsville, joining the Cowboys' Young Guns squad. That season, he played for the Townsville Blackhawks in the Queensland Cup and Hastings Deering Colts, starting at second-row in the Blackhawks' Colts Grand Final win over the Redcliffe Dolphins. In June 2022, he represented Queensland under-19 in their loss to New South Wales.

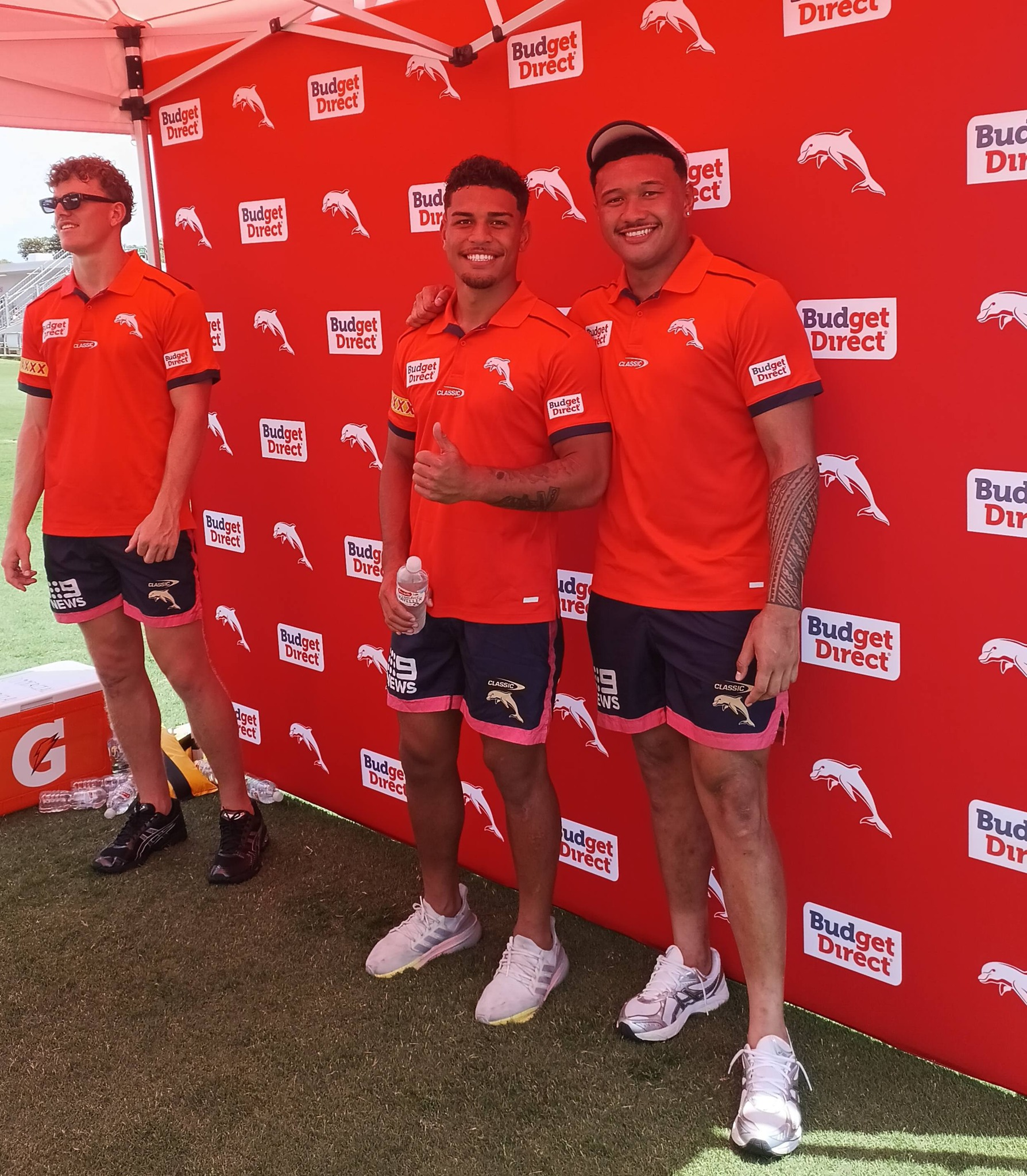
Jack Bostock, Tevita Naufahu and Kulikefu Finefeuiaki in 2026

=== North Queensland Cowboys (2023-24) ===
In April, Finefeuiaki was upgraded to a development contract, joining the Cowboys NRL squad.

In round 10 of the 2023 NRL season, Finefeuiaki made his first grade debut in North Queensland's 20–6 win over the Sydney Roosters at Suncorp Stadium. In round 16, he scored his first try in the top grade as North Queensland defeated Penrith 27–23 in golden point extra-time. He played a total of 12 games for North Queensland in the 2023 NRL season as the club finished 11th on the table.

=== Dolphins (2025-) ===
In April 2024, the Dolphins signed Finefeuiaki on a three-year contract from 2025. Finefeuiaki played 20 games for the Dolphins in the 2025 NRL season as the club narrowly missed out on the finals finishing 9th. On 18 September 2026, the Dolphins announced that Finefeuiaki had re-signed with the club until 2029. He played 24 matches for the club in the 2026 NRL season including their preliminary final loss to eventual premiers the Sydney Roosters.

=== State of Origin ===
He made his début for Queensland on 17 June 2026 in Game 2 in the 2026 State of Origin 24–44 win at the MCG.

== Statistics ==
Year	Team	Games	Tries	Pts
2023	North Queensland Cowboys	12	2	8
2024	North Queensland Cowboys	25	3	12
2025	Dolphins	20	1	4
2026	Dolphins	23	3	12
2027	Dolphins			
	Totals	80	9	36
