= Brian Pouniu =

New Zealand rugby league footballer (born 2007)

Personal information
- Born: 11 October 2007 (age 19) Auckland, New Zealand
- Height: 185 cm (6 ft 1 in)
- Weight: 96 kg (15 st 2 lb)

Playing information
- Position: Second-row, Centre
Club
Years	Team	Pld	T	G	FG	P
2026–	Dolphins	3	0	0	0	0
- Source: RLP

Brian Pouniu (born 11 October 2007) is a New Zealand rugby league footballer for the Dolphins in the National Rugby League (NRL).

== Early life ==
Born in Auckland, Pouniu attended St Eugene College in Burpengary, Queensland, serving as school captain.

== Career ==
Pouniu is a Dolphins Academy product and was the club's first NRL player to come up via all for their grades, starting with the Redcliffe juniors. He captained the Dolphins under-16s to a premiership in the 2024 Cyril Connell Cup and in 2026 gained selection for the Queensland under-19s State or Origin side.

During the 2026 NRL season, Pouniu became the youngest Dolphins first-grade debutant when he played as a centre against the Canberra Raiders in round 12 at the age of 18. He made a further two appearances late in the season as a second-rower. At the end of season awards, Pouniu was named the club's "Rookie of the Year".

== Personal life ==
Pouniu is the younger brother of former Gold Coast Titans junior Joseph Pouniu who became a quadriplegic after suffering an on-field spinal injury.
