= St Eugene College =

Location
- 138 Station Road, Burpengary, City of Moreton Bay, Queensland; Australia; 27°09′08″S 152°58′07″E

Information
- Other name: St Eugene Catholic College
- Former name: St Eugene School
- Type: Systemic co-educational primary and secondary school
- Motto: Dare to grow in Faith, Hope and Love.
- Religious affiliation: Brisbane Catholic Education
- Denomination: Roman Catholicism
- Patron saint: St Eugene de Mazenod
- Opened: 1990; 36 years ago
- Principal: Louise Olley
- Website: www.steugene.qld.edu.au

St Eugene College is a partially selective, co-educational Catholic school, located in Burpengary, Queensland, Australia that provides education for students P–12 and was the first secondary school in Burpengary.

== Social justice ==
The school's patron is St Eugene de Mazenod and the school provides education according to the principles of the order of the Missionary Oblates of Mary Immaculate which St Eugene founded. The Oblate understanding of the message of Jesus Christ incorporates respect for the dignity of all people and calls for action towards social justice to achieve these aims. The school organises and participates in events that promote social inclusion.

In June 2017, 120 of the staff and students of the school volunteered for school detention to raise awareness of the refugees being held in Australian immigration detention facilities.

In August 2017, the school community conducted a "sleep out" to highlight the plight of homeless people, accompanied by a giving campaign of blankets, non-perishable food and funds to the Society of St Vincent de Paul to assist homeless people.
