= Tevita Naufahu =

New Zealand rugby league footballer

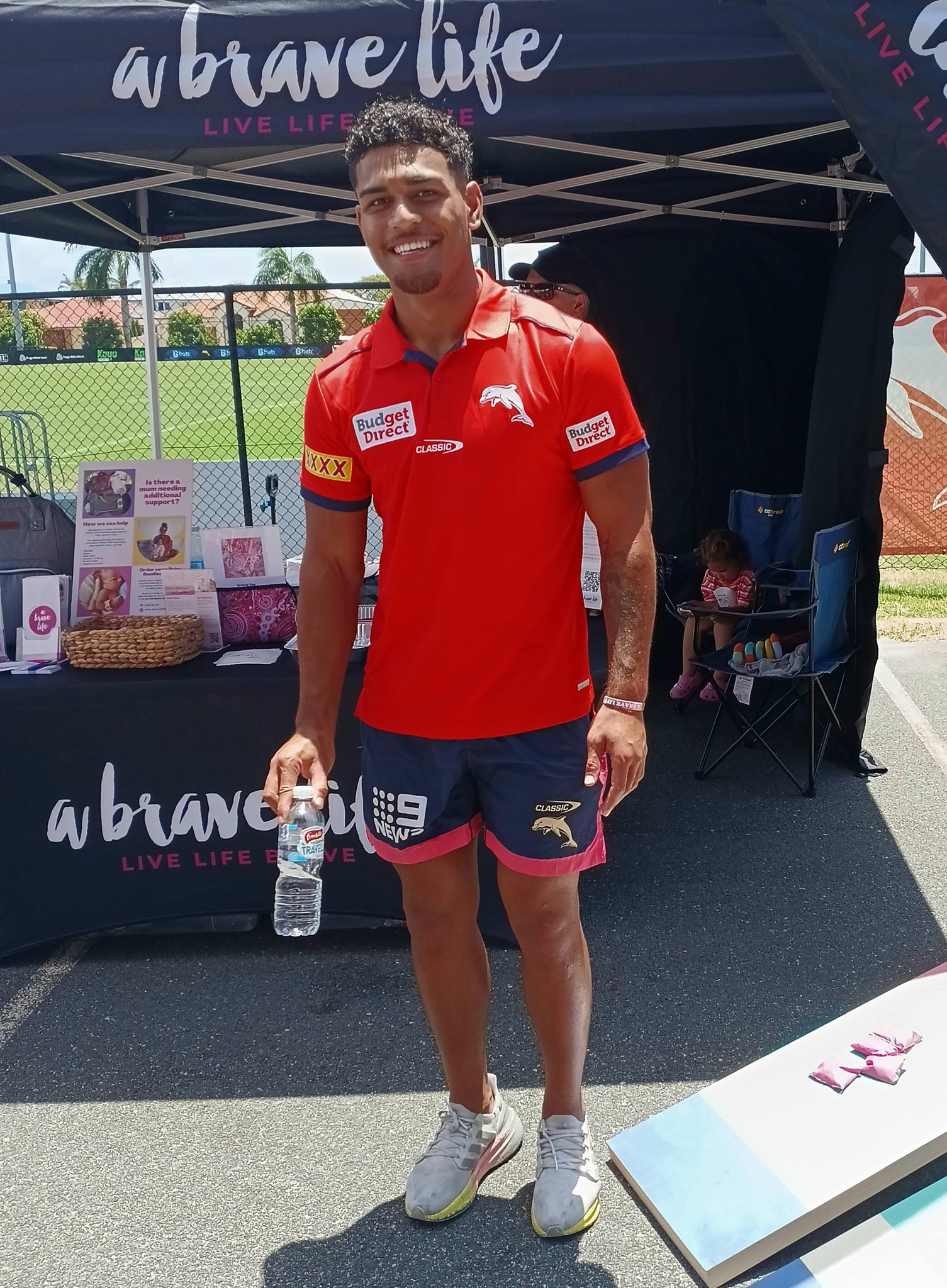

Personal information
- Born: 7 November 2005 (age 20) Auckland, New Zealand
- Height: 183 cm (6 ft 0 in)
- Weight: 87 kg (13 st 10 lb)

Playing information
- Position: Wing, Centre
Club
Years	Team	Pld	T	G	FG	P
2025–	Dolphins	15	9	0	0	36
- Source: As of 5 October 2026

Tevita Naufahu (born 7 November 2005) is a professional rugby league footballer from New Zealand who plays as a winger and centre for the Dolphins in the National Rugby League (NRL).

== Background ==
Naufahu was born in New Zealand and is of Tongan heritage. He attended St Kentigern College in Auckland, where he played in the First XV rugby union team and represented New Zealand Schools before switching to rugby league. Naufahu later joined the Dolphins’ development list ahead of the 2025 season. He is dating Gold Coast Titans NRLW player Indie Bostock, sister of his teammate Jack Bostock.

== Playing career ==
Naufahu played for the Central Queensland Capras in the 2025 Hostplus Cup, scoring eight tries in nine appearances. He averaged 135 running metres per game, made 47 tackle breaks and recorded a tackle efficiency of 82.7%.

== Dolphins (2025-present) ==
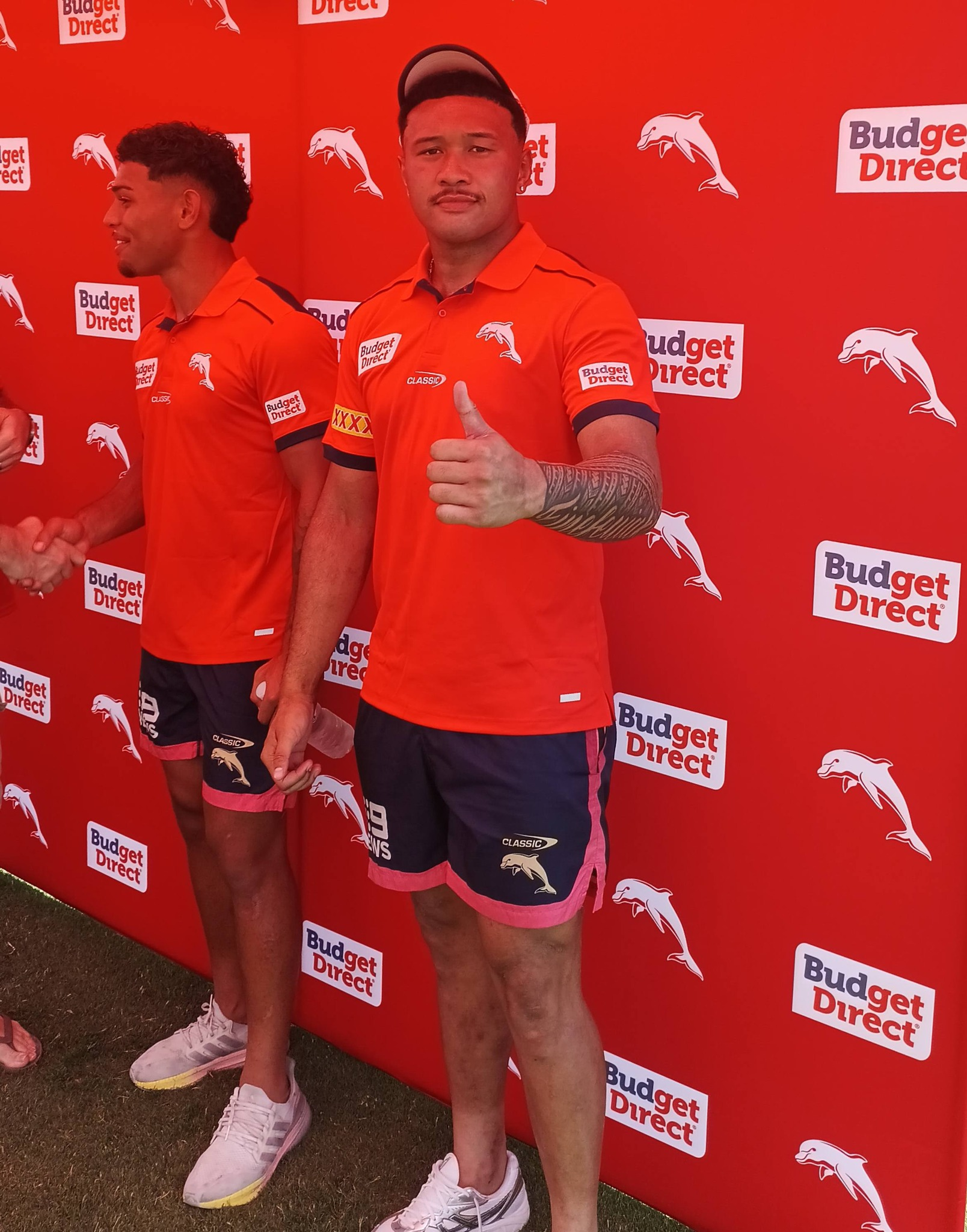
Naufahu (left) with Kulikefu Finefeuiaki in January 2026

Naufahu made his NRL debut with the Dolphins in Round 19 of the 2025 NRL season, starting on the wing in a 12-24 loss to the Cronulla-Sutherland Sharks at PointsBet Stadium. He played a total of seven NRL games in 2025 and scored six tries.

On 16 September 2026, the Dolphins announced that Naufahu had re-signed with the club for a further three years. Naufahu was selected for 8 NRL games in 2026 and won the Queensland Cup and the State Championship final playing for Redcliffe.

== Achievements and honours ==
Team

2026 Queensland Cup - Winners

2026 NRL State Championship - Winners

Individual

- CQ Capras Rookie of the Year: 2025
- Dolphins Rookie of the Year: 2025
