= Jarrett Subloo =

Australian rugby league player

Personal information
- Born: 29 July 2000 (age 26) Innisfail, Queensland, Australia
- Height: 185 cm (6 ft 1 in)
- Weight: 90 kg (14 st 2 lb)

Playing information
- Position: Five-eighth
Club
Years	Team	Pld	T	G	FG	P
2020	Canberra Raiders	1	0	0	0	0
- Source: As of 22 September 2020

Jarrett Subloo (born 29 July 2000) is an Australian professional rugby league footballer who plays as a five-eighth for the Brisbane Tigers in the Queensland Cup.

He previously played for the Canberra Raiders in the National Rugby League.

== Background ==
Born in Innisfail, Queensland and of Italian descent, Subloo played his junior rugby league for the Innisfail Leprechauns and attended Good Counsel College, Innisfail before being signed by the Brisbane Broncos. He later attended St Joseph's College, Nudgee until he graduated in 2018.

== Playing career ==
=== Early career ===
In 2016, Subloo played for the Norths Devils in the Cyril Connell Cup. In 2018, Subloo joined the Canberra Raiders and played for their SG Ball Cup side. In 2019, he moved up to the Raiders' Jersey Flegg Cup side. On 4 October 2019, he was named in Italy's 2021 Men's Rugby League World Cup qualifying squad but did not play a game.

In November 2019, Subloo joined the Raiders' NRL squad as a development player.

=== 2020 ===
In round 20 of the 2020 NRL season, Subloo made his first grade debut for Canberra against the Cronulla-Sutherland Sharks at Kogarah Oval coming onto the field with only one minute remaining.

Subloo made no further appearances for Canberra in the 2020 NRL season as the club reached the preliminary final but were defeated by eventual premiers Melbourne 30–10.

=== 2023 & 2024 ===
In 2023, Subloo joined South Sydney's NSW Cup side. In 2024, he played 17 games for South Sydney in the NSW Cup.

=== 2025 & 2026 ===
In 2025, Subloo played for the Northern Pride. In 2026, he joined the Brisbane Tigers.
