= Isaiya Katoa =

Tonga international rugby league footballer

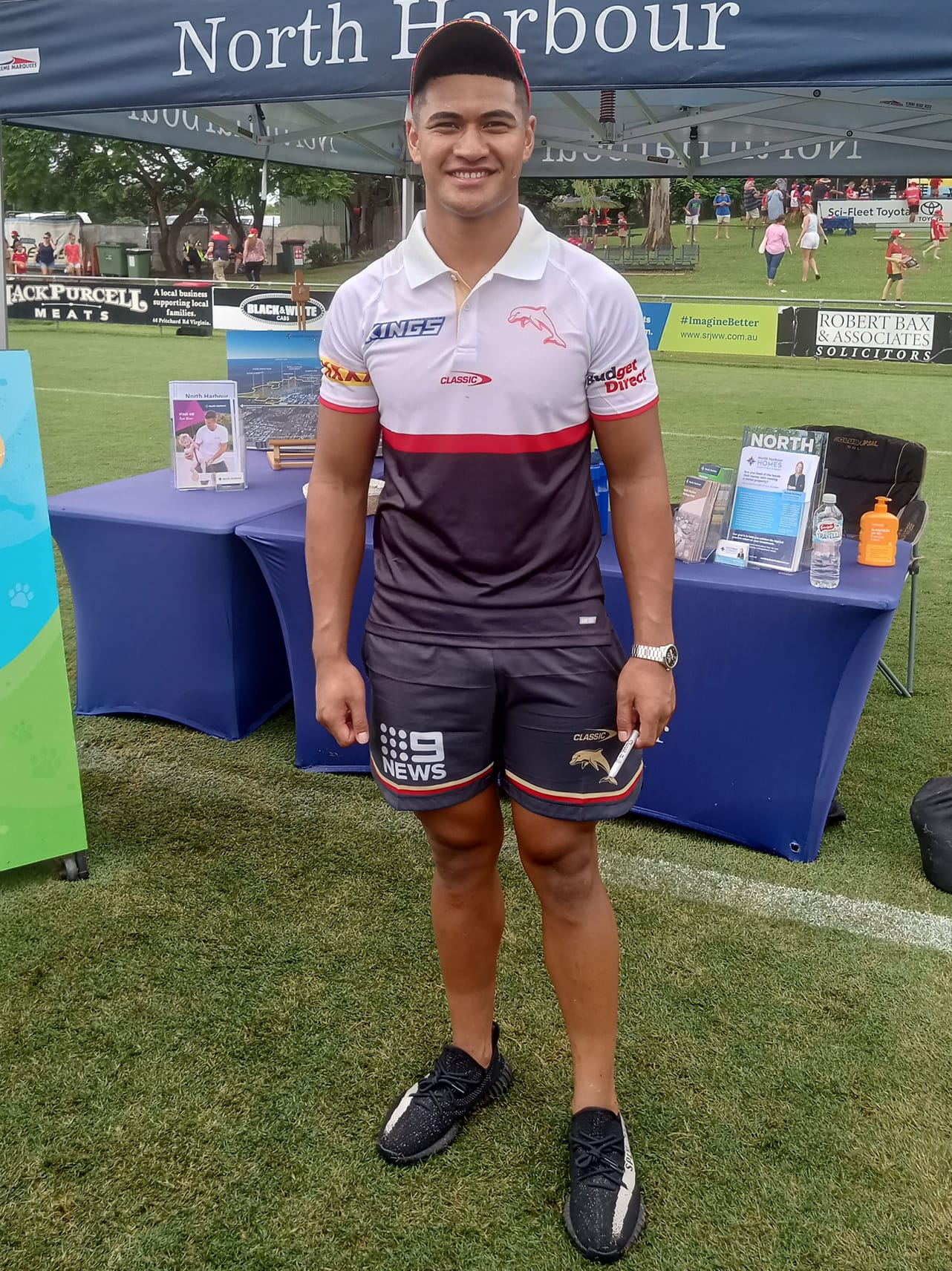

Personal information
- Born: 18 February 2004 (age 22) Lower Hutt, New Zealand
- Height: 181 cm (5 ft 11 in)
- Weight: 91 kg (14 st 5 lb)

Playing information
- Position: Halfback, Five-eighth
Club
Years	Team	Pld	T	G	FG	P
2023–	Dolphins	90	8	2	1	37
Representative
Years	Team	Pld	T	G	FG	P
2022–	Tonga	14	2	45	1	99
- Source: As of 16 November 2026
- Relatives: Sione Katoa (brother); Sam Wykes (cousin)

Isaiya Katoa (born 18 February 2004) is a Tonga international rugby league footballer who plays as a halfback and captains the Dolphins in the National Rugby League (NRL).

== Background ==
Katoa was born in Wellington, New Zealand to a family of Tongan and Cook Islands descent. He moved to Sydney at nine years of age where he was educated at Barker College, Hornsby and played junior rugby league for Glenmore Park Brumbies alongside future Wallaby player Joseph Sua'ali'i.

He is the brother to current NRL player Sione Katoa and second cousin of former Rugby Union footballer Sam Wykes.

== Playing career ==
=== Rugby Union ===
Katoa moved to Australia when he was nine. He attended Barker College for year 11 and 12. Katoa was selected at inside centre for NSW Waratahs Academy u18 team in 2021 after strong performances for Barker College and CAS. At Barker, he won a Combined Associated Schools Championship and a Manu Sutherland Shield beating St Joseph's College, Nudgee in 2022.

=== International career ===
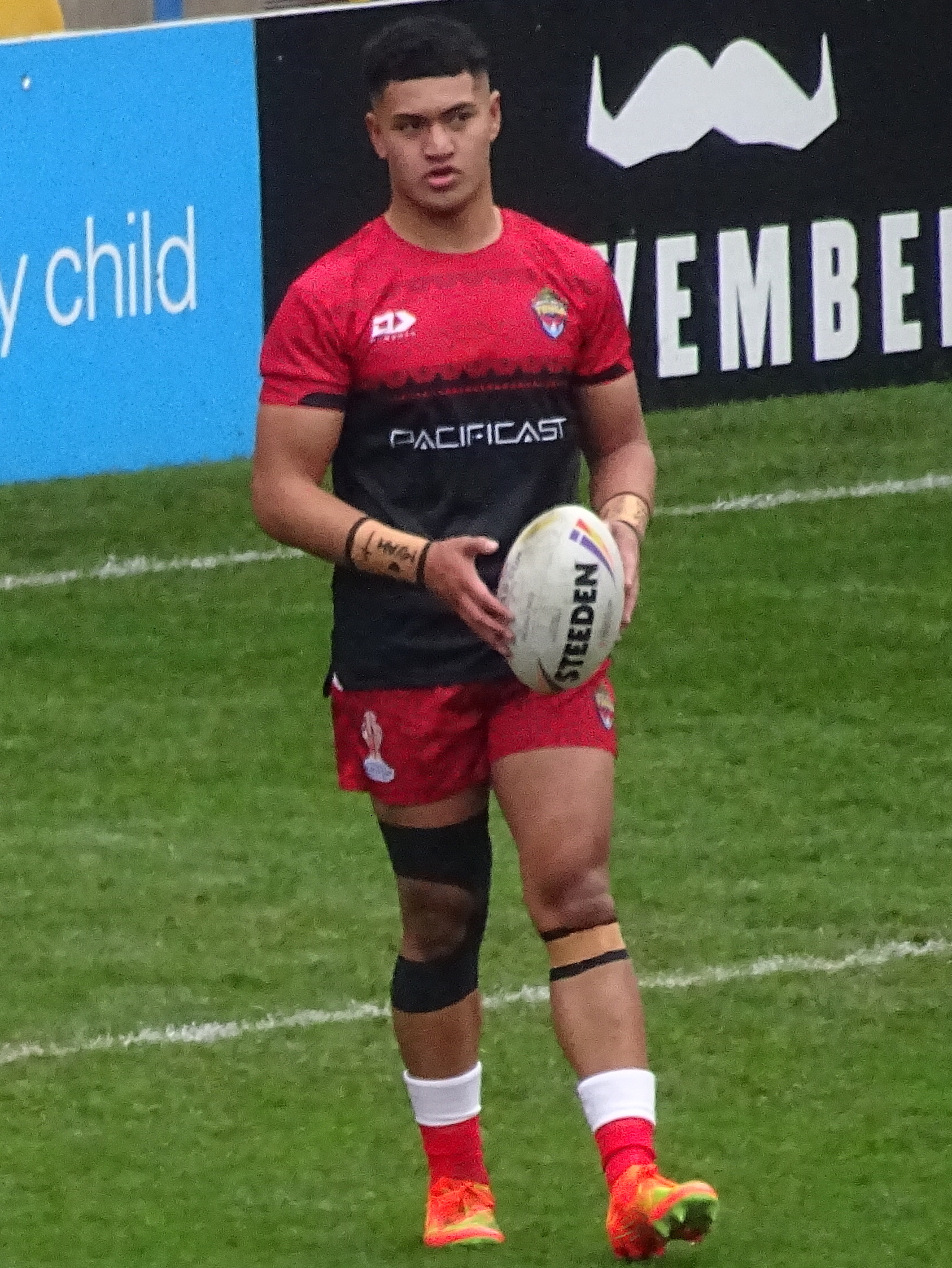
Katoa playing for Tonga in 2022

In 2022, Katoa was named in the Tonga squad for the 2021 Rugby League World Cup. In late 2022, Katoa played three matches at the 2021 Rugby League World Cup including Tonga's quarter-final loss to Samoa. The following year, Katoa was selected to represent Tonga in a three-Test series against England, kicking off at St Helens' Totally Wicked Stadium on 22 October 2023.

=== Club career ===
Katoa was contracted to the Penrith Panthers as a junior coming through the ranks, before signing with the Dolphins on the day of his 18th birthday for their inaugural 2023 NRL season.

=== Dolphins (2023-present) ===
In round 1 of the 2023 NRL season, Katoa made his NRL debut with the Dolphins in their inaugural game in the national competition, defeating the Sydney Roosters 28–18 at Suncorp Stadium. In round 10 against the Cronulla-Sutherland Sharks at Suncorp Stadium, Katoa scored a try for the Dolphins in their 36–16 victory. In September, the Dolphins' Inaugural Presentation Ball was held at Brisbane Convention and Exhibition Centre, and Katoa received the club's annual Rookie of the Year award. Katoa played a total of 22 games for the Dolphins in the 2024 NRL season as the club finished 10th on the table. Katoa played every match for the Dolphins in the 2025 NRL season as the club narrowly missed out on the finals finishing 9th. Katoa played 22 matches for the club in the 2026 NRL season including their preliminary final loss to eventual premiers the Sydney Roosters.

== Statistics ==
Year	Team	Games	Tries	Goals	FG	Pts
2023	Dolphins	22	2	0	0	70
2024	Dolphins	22	2	1	0	10
2025	Dolphins	24	2	0	1	9
2026	Dolphins	22	2	1	0	0
2027	Dolphins					
	Totals	90	8	2	1	37

== Achievements and accolades ==
=== Individual ===
- Dolphins Rookie of the Year: 2023
