= Jake Averillo =

Australian rugby league footballer (born 2000)

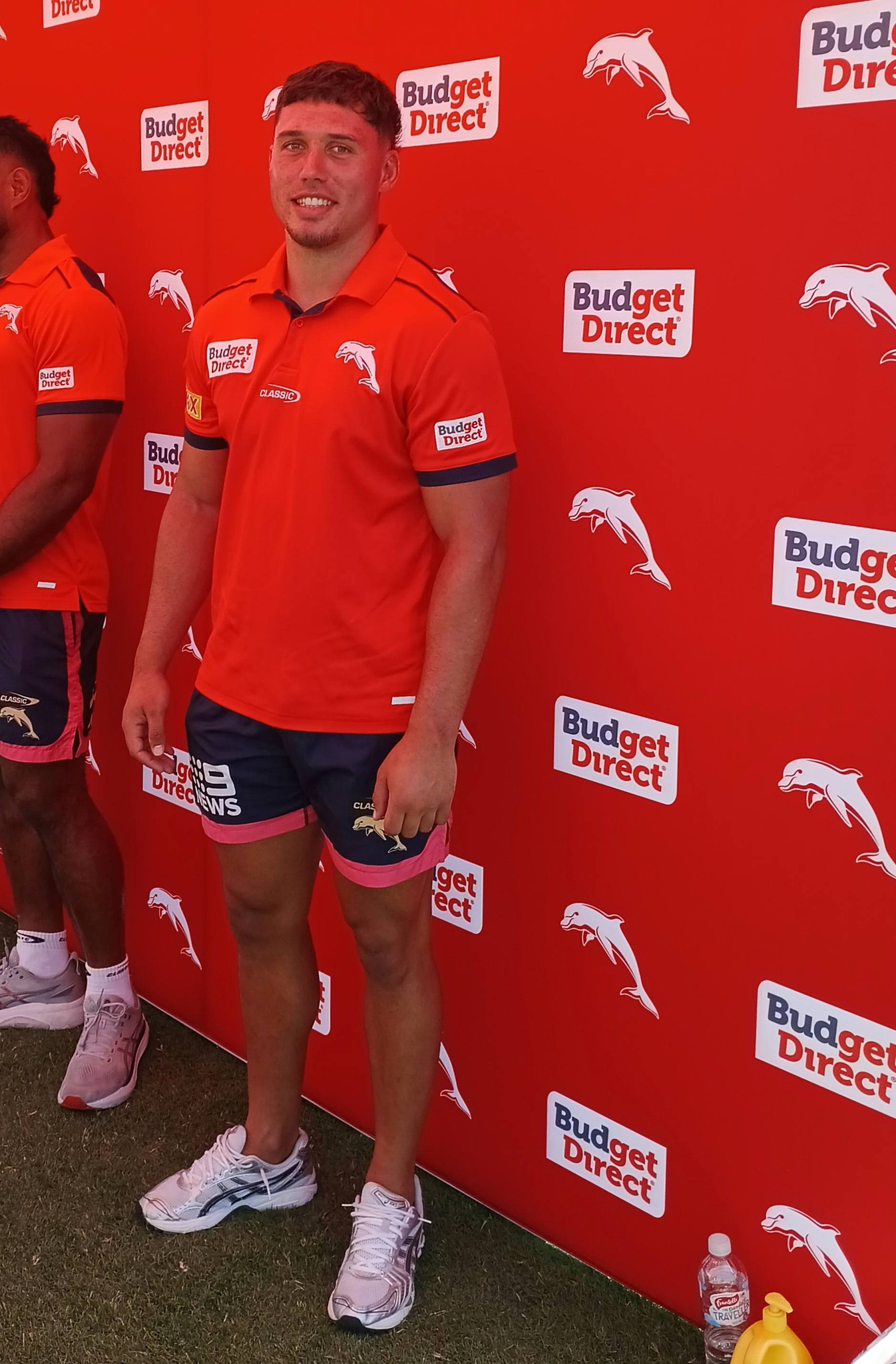

Personal information
- Born: 11 August 2000 (age 26) Sydney, New South Wales, Australia
- Height: 183 cm (6 ft 0 in)
- Weight: 92 kg (14 st 7 lb)

Playing information
- Position: Centre, Fullback, Five-eighth, Halfback
Club
Years	Team	Pld	T	G	FG	P
2020–23	Canterbury Bulldogs	78	31	39	0	202
2024–26	Dolphins	57	28	0	0	112
2027–	Wests Tigers	0	0	0	0	0
	Total	135	59	39	0	314
Representative
Years	Team	Pld	T	G	FG	P
2022	Prime Minister's XIII	1	1	0	0	4
- Source: As of 21 November 2026

Jake Averillo (born 11 August 2000) is an Australian professional rugby league footballer who plays as a centre for the Wests Tigers in the National Rugby League (NRL).

Averillo previously played for the Canterbury-Bankstown Bulldogs and Dolphins. He also played as a winger, five-eighth and halfback earlier in his career.

== Background ==
Averillo was born in Sydney and played junior rugby league for Bankstown Sports and Moorebank Rams. He is the nephew of Socceroo Jason Van Blerk, the grandson of Socceroo Cliff Van Blerk and is of Zimbabwean & Italian descent.

== Playing career ==
=== Canterbury–Bankstown Bulldogs (2020–2023) ===
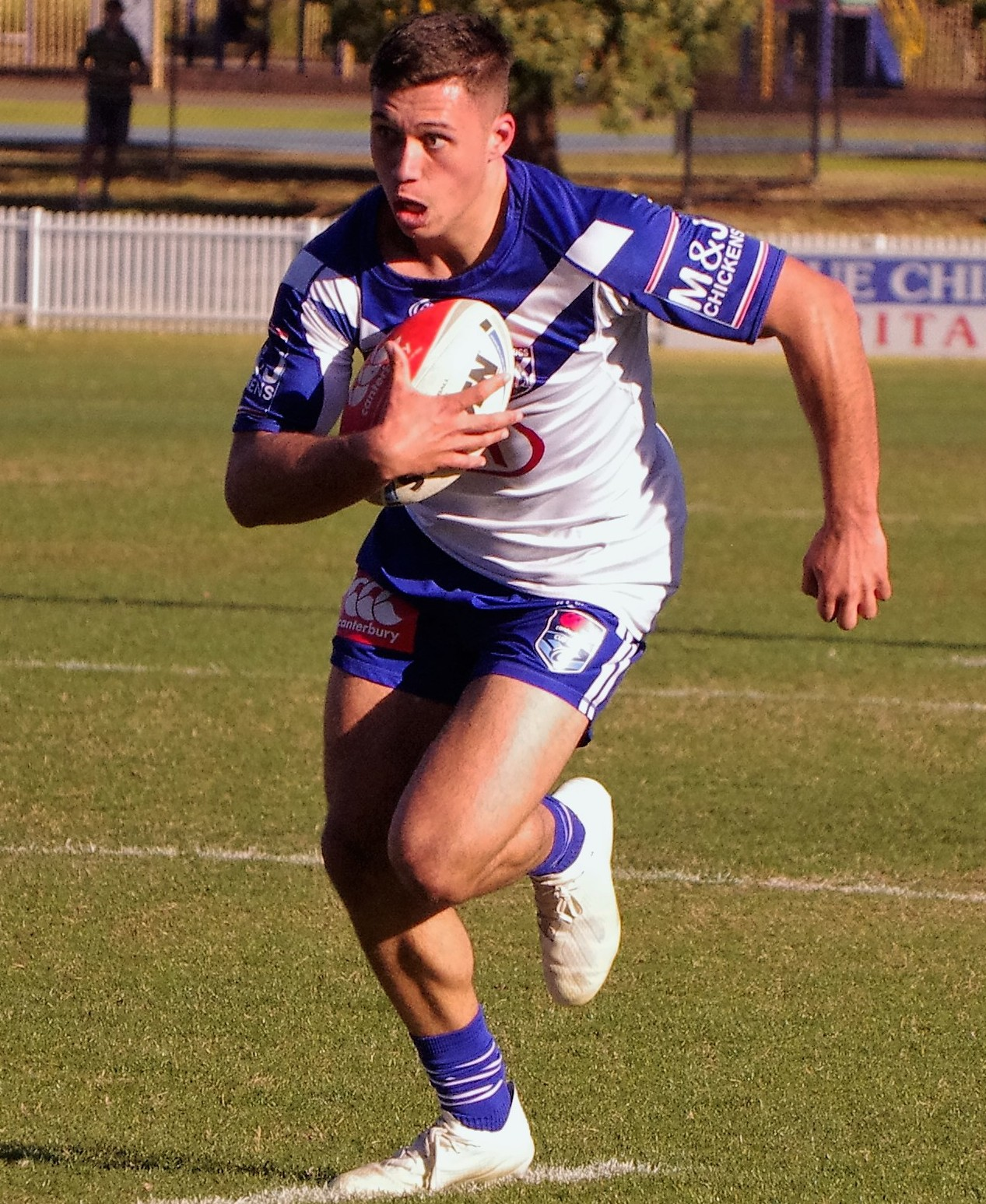
Jake Averillo with the Bulldogs

Averillo made his NRL debut in round 2 of the 2020 season for the Canterbury-Bankstown Bulldogs against the North Queensland Cowboys at ANZ Stadium.

In round 14 of the 2021 NRL season, Averillo scored two tries and kicked five goals as Canterbury–Bankstown defeated St. George Illawarra. This was Canterbury–Bankstown's second win for the season. In round 22, Averillo broke his hand in Canterbury-Bankstown's loss against the New Zealand Warriors. In round 25, he scored two tries for Canterbury–Bankstown in a 38–0 victory over the Wests Tigers. Averillo made a total of twenty-one appearances for Canterbury–Bankstown in the 2021 NRL season.

In round 12 of the 2022 NRL season, he scored two tries for Canterbury–Bankstown in their 34–24 loss against St. George Illawarra at Belmore Sports Ground. In round 14, Averillo scored two tries for Canterbury-Bankstown in their 34–4 victory over the Parramatta Eels. The following week, he scored two tries in Canterbury–Bankstown's 36–12 victory over the Wests Tigers. Averillo played a total of twenty matches for Canterbury-Bankstown throughout the season, scoring nine tries. The club finished twelfth on the table and missed the finals.

In round 9 of the 2023 NRL season, Averillo scored two tries for Canterbury–Bankstown in their 18–16 victory over St. George Illawarra. The following week, Averillo scored two tries in Canterbury-Bankstown's 30–34 loss against Canberra. In round 20 of the 2023 NRL season, Averillo scored two tries for Canterbury in their 44–24 loss against Brisbane.

=== Dolphins (2024–2026) ===
Averillo commenced a three-year contract with the Dolphins from 2024 onwards. In round 26 of the 2024 NRL season, Averillo scored two tries for the Dolphins in their 40–6 victory over the Brisbane Broncos. Averillo played a total of twenty-three matches for the Dolphins in the 2024 NRL season and scored eleven tries as the club finished 10th on the table. Averillo played every game for the Dolphins in the 2025 NRL season as the club narrowly missed out on the finals finishing 9th.

On 4 June 2026, it was reported that Averillo had signed a long term deal with the Wests Tigers. On 24 June the Tigers confirmed that Averillo had signed with the club on a four year deal. Averillo was selected for 10 NRL games in 2026 and won the Queensland Cup and the State Championship final playing for Redcliffe; winning man of the match in the State Championship.

== Statistics ==
Year	Team	Games	Tries	Goals	Pts
2020	Canterbury-Bankstown Bulldogs	13	3	12	36
2021	Canterbury-Bankstown Bulldogs	21	7	27	82
2022	Canterbury-Bankstown Bulldogs	20	9		36
2023	Canterbury-Bankstown Bulldogs	24	6		24
2024	Dolphins	23	11		44
2025	Dolphins	24	11		44
2026	Dolphins	10	6		24
2027	Wests Tigers				
	Totals	135	59	39	314
