= Jeremy Marshall-King =

NZ & Maori international rugby league footballer

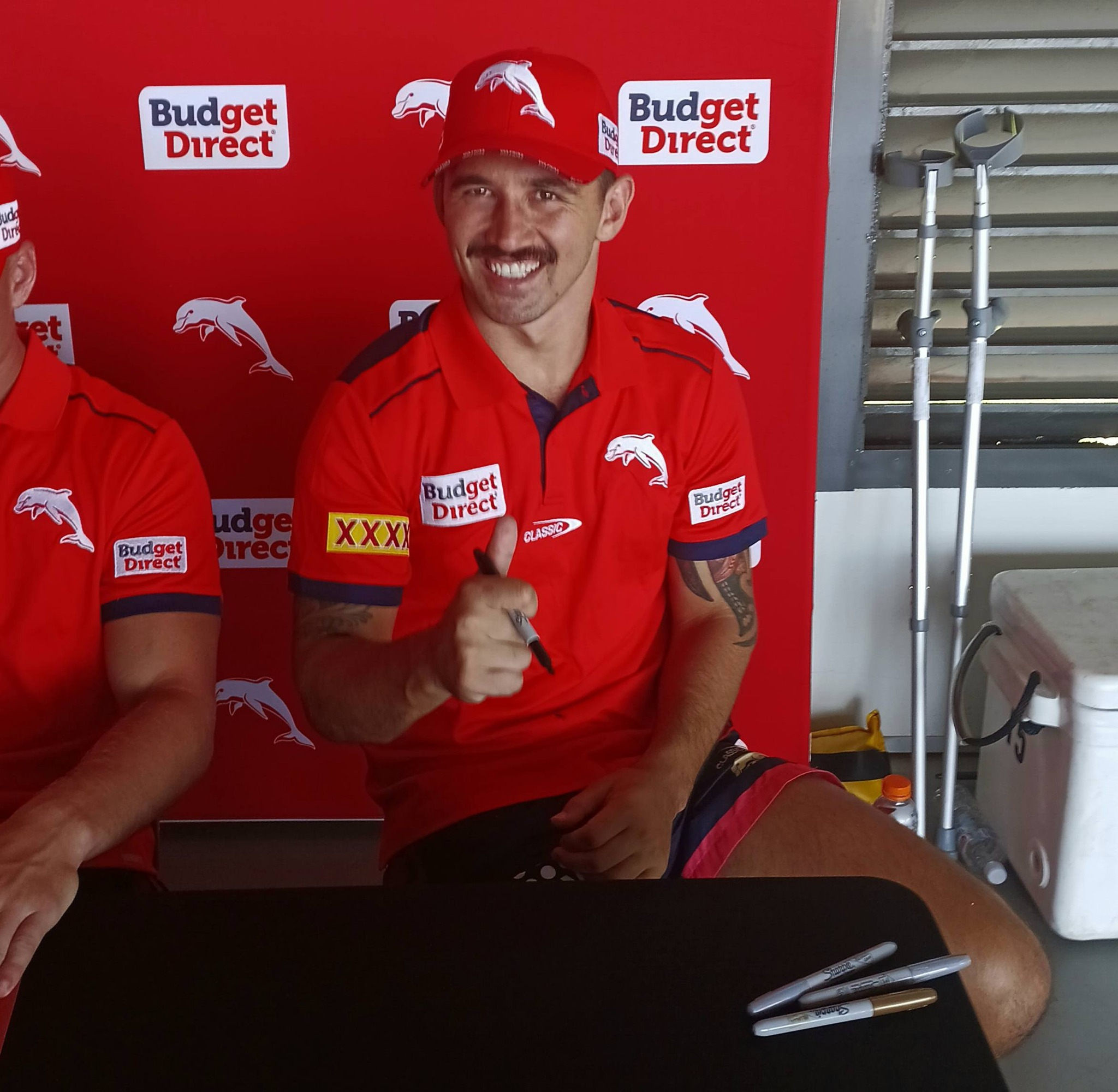

Personal information
- Born: 2 December 1995 (age 30) Whakatāne, Bay of Plenty, New Zealand
- Height: 186 cm (6 ft 1 in)
- Weight: 83 kg (13 st 1 lb)

Playing information
- Position: Hooker, Five-eighth
Club
Years	Team	Pld	T	G	FG	P
2017	Wests Tigers	1	0	0	0	0
2018–22	Canterbury Bulldogs	99	10	0	0	40
2023–	Dolphins	69	11	0	0	44
	Total	169	21	0	0	84
Representative
Years	Team	Pld	T	G	FG	P
2021–25	Māori All Stars	2	0	0	0	0
2022–	New Zealand	8	2	0	0	8
- Source: As of 15 November 2026
- Relatives: Benji Marshall (brother)

Jeremy Marshall-King (born 2 December 1995) is a New Zealand professional rugby league footballer who plays as a hooker for the Dolphins in the National Rugby League (NRL), and New Zealand at international level.

He previously played for the Canterbury-Bankstown Bulldogs and Wests Tigers in the NRL and represented the Māori All Stars.

== Background ==
Marshall-King was born in Whakatāne, New Zealand. He is of Māori descent. He moved to Sydney, Australia at a young age and played junior rugby league for All Saints Toongabbie, before being signed by the Wests Tigers.

Marshall-King is the younger brother of New Zealand international Benji Marshall.

== Playing career ==
=== Early career ===
In 2014 and 2015, Marshall-King played for the Wests Tigers' NYC team, before graduating to their Intrust Super Premiership NSW team in 2016.

=== Wests Tigers 2017 ===
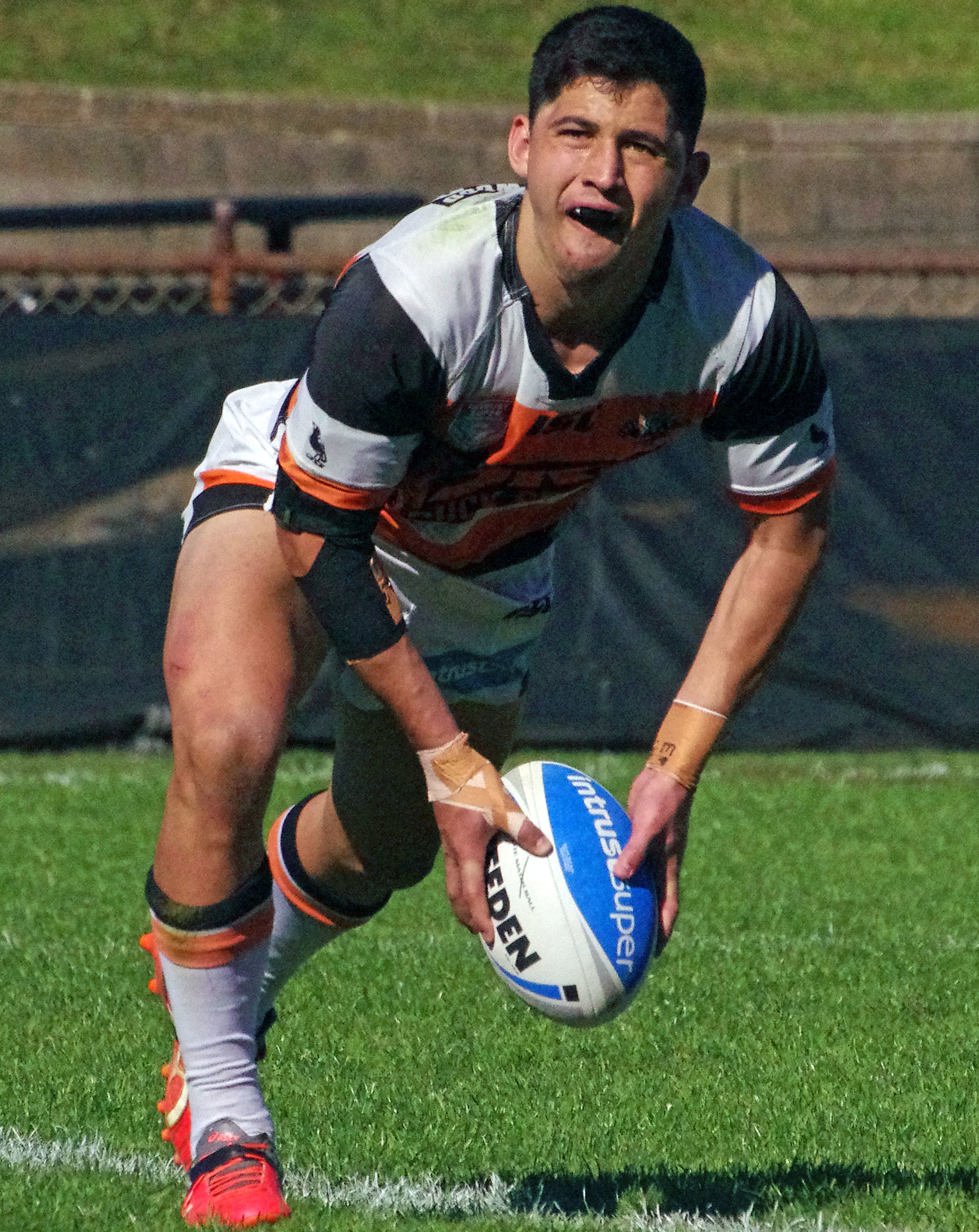
Marshall-King in 2016

In round 26 of the 2017 NRL season, Marshall-King made his NRL debut for the Tigers against the New Zealand Warriors. He spent the majority of 2017 playing for the Tigers in the Intrust Super Premiership NSW competition, making 19 appearances in a side that finished last on the table. In November, he signed a two-year contract with the Canterbury-Bankstown Bulldogs starting in 2018.

=== Canterbury-Bankstown Bulldogs 2018-2022 ===
In round 1 of the 2018 season, Marshall-King made his club debut for the Canterbury-Bankstown Bulldogs against the Melbourne Storm, coming off the bench at hooker in the Bulldogs' 18–36 loss at Perth Stadium. In round 3, he earned the starting spot at five-eighth.

Marshall-King played 23 games for Canterbury in the 2019 NRL season as the club finished 12th on the table. He made twenty appearances for Canterbury in the 2020 NRL season. The club finished in 15th place on the table, only avoiding the wooden spoon by for and against. Marshall-King made a total of nine appearances for Canterbury in the 2021 NRL season as the club finished last and claimed their sixth wooden spoon.

=== Dolphins 2023-present ===
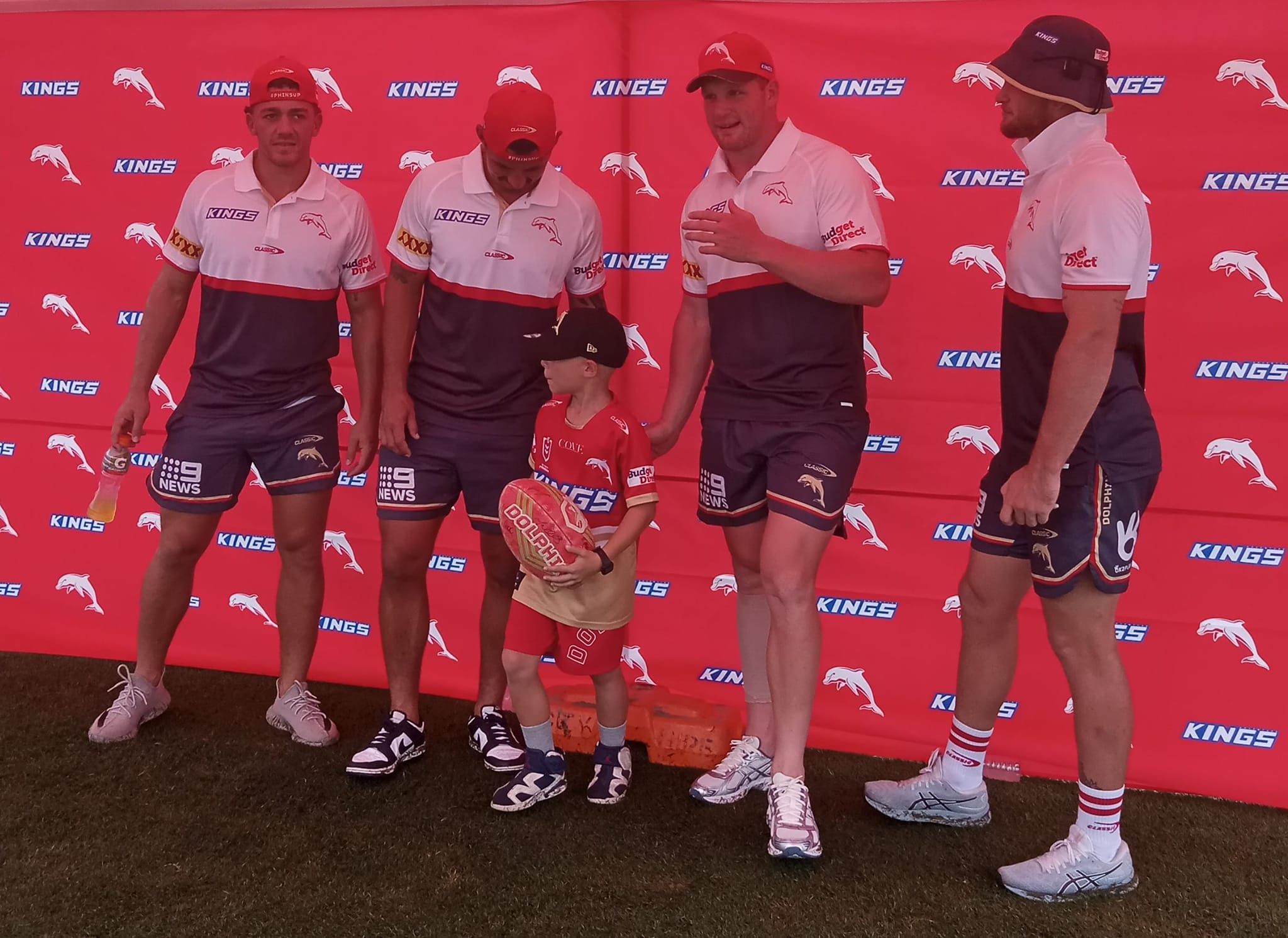
Marshall-King (second from left) with other Dolphins in 2024

Marshall-King signed a two-year deal with the newly admitted Dolphins. In round 1 of the 2023 NRL season, he made his club debut for the Dolphins as hooker in their inaugural game in the national competition, when they pulled off a major upset defeating the Sydney Roosters 28–18 at Suncorp Stadium. In total, Marshall-King played fifteen games and scored two tries for the Dolphins in 2023.

He played a total of seventeen games for the Dolphins in the 2024 NRL season as the club finished 10th on the table. on 18 June, Marshall-King re-signed with the club until the end of 2028.

Marshall-King played nineteen matches for the Dolphins in the 2025 NRL season as the club narrowly missed out on the finals, finishing 9th.

On 9 January 2026, Marshall-King was ruled for up to 3 months after suffering a knee injury at home. Marshall-King played 18 games for the club in the 2026 NRL season including their preliminary final loss to eventual premiers the Sydney Roosters.

== Statistics ==
Year	Team	Games	Tries	Pts
2017	Wests Tigers	1		
2018	Canterbury-Bankstown Bulldogs	23	2	8
2019	Canterbury-Bankstown Bulldogs	23	1	4
2020	Canterbury-Bankstown Bulldogs	20	1	4
2021	Canterbury-Bankstown Bulldogs	9	1	4
2022	Canterbury-Bankstown Bulldogs	24	5	20
2023	Dolphins	15	2	8
2024	Dolphins	17	2	8
2025	Dolphins	19	4	16
2026	Dolphins	17	3	12
2027	Dolphins			
	Totals	168	21	84
