= Jack Bostock =

Australia international rugby league footballer

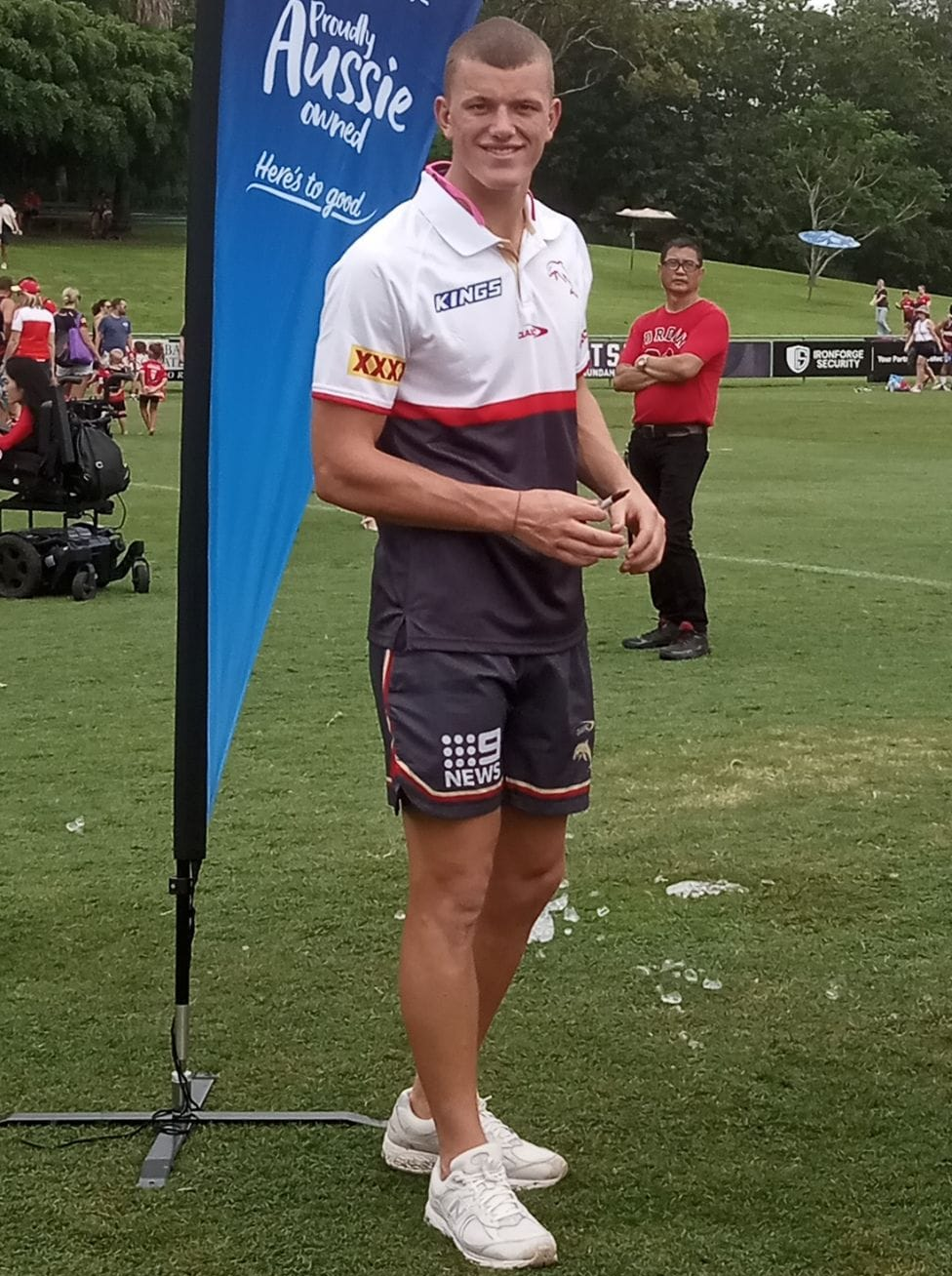

Personal information
- Born: 28 August 2003 (age 23) Figtree, New South Wales, Australia
- Height: 194 cm (6 ft 4 in)
- Weight: 97 kg (15 st 4 lb)

Playing information
- Position: Wing, Centre
Club
Years	Team	Pld	T	G	FG	P
2023 2028–	Dolphins Rabbitohs(NRL)	56	31	0	0	124
Representative
Years	Team	Pld	T	G	FG	P
2026	New South Wales	1	0	0	0	0
2026–	Australia	5	9	0	0	36
- Source: As of 22 November 2026
- Father: Josh Bostock
- Relatives: Indie Bostock (sister)

Jack Bostock (born 28 August 2003) is an Australian professional rugby league footballer who plays as a winger or centre for the Dolphins in the National Rugby League and Australia at international level.

== Background ==
Bostock was born in Figtree, New South Wales. He was signed by the Dolphins after being spotted playing junior reps with the Illawarra Steelers and for the NSW under-19 team. Jack's younger sister Indie Bostock debuted for the NRLW team St George Illawarra Dragons on 5 July 2025.

== Playing career ==
=== Early career ===
Bostock was contracted to the St. George Illawarra Dragons as a junior coming through the ranks, before signing with the Dolphins for their inaugural 2023 NRL season. Unwanted by the Dragons, Bostock said, "Obviously, it's a bit of a reality check. I know that clubs can't keep everyone and people have their different ways. The coaches and recruitment staff back then at the Dragons wanted to go a different way, and that’s totally fine."

=== Dolphins (2023–) ===
In round 5 of the 2023 NRL season, Bostock made his first grade debut and played the full eighty minutes on the wing for the Dolphins in their 38−12 loss to the St. George Illawarra Dragons at Wollongong Showground.

In the 2024 NRL season, Bostock played twenty-three matches and scored fourteen tries for the Dolphins. These included a hat-trick in the club's 44-16 victory over Parramatta in round 7. He was named as the Dally M (Dally Messenger) Rookie of the Year.

In round 15 of the 2025 NRL season, Bostock scored four tries for the Dolphins in their 58-4 victory over North Queensland. In round 16, he incurred an ACL injury and was sidelined until round 9 2026. Bostock played 16 games for the club in the 2026 NRL season including their preliminary final loss to eventual premiers the Sydney Roosters.

=== Representative ===
He made his New South Wales début on 8 July 2026 in the 12-30 win over Queensland in Match III of the 2026 State of Origin series; he replaced Brian To'o.

He made his Australia international début in the opening game of the 2026 Rugby League World Cup in the 24-22 win over New Zealand; scoring 3 tries.

On 8 November 2026, In Australia’s semi final against Samoa, he famously got into an altercation with Samoa Hooker Jazz Tevaga during the Siva Tau. They continued to target each other the rest of the game in the famous battle between the Pacific Nations. On 15 November 2026, Bostock played in Australia's 2026 Rugby League World Cup final victory over New Zealand.

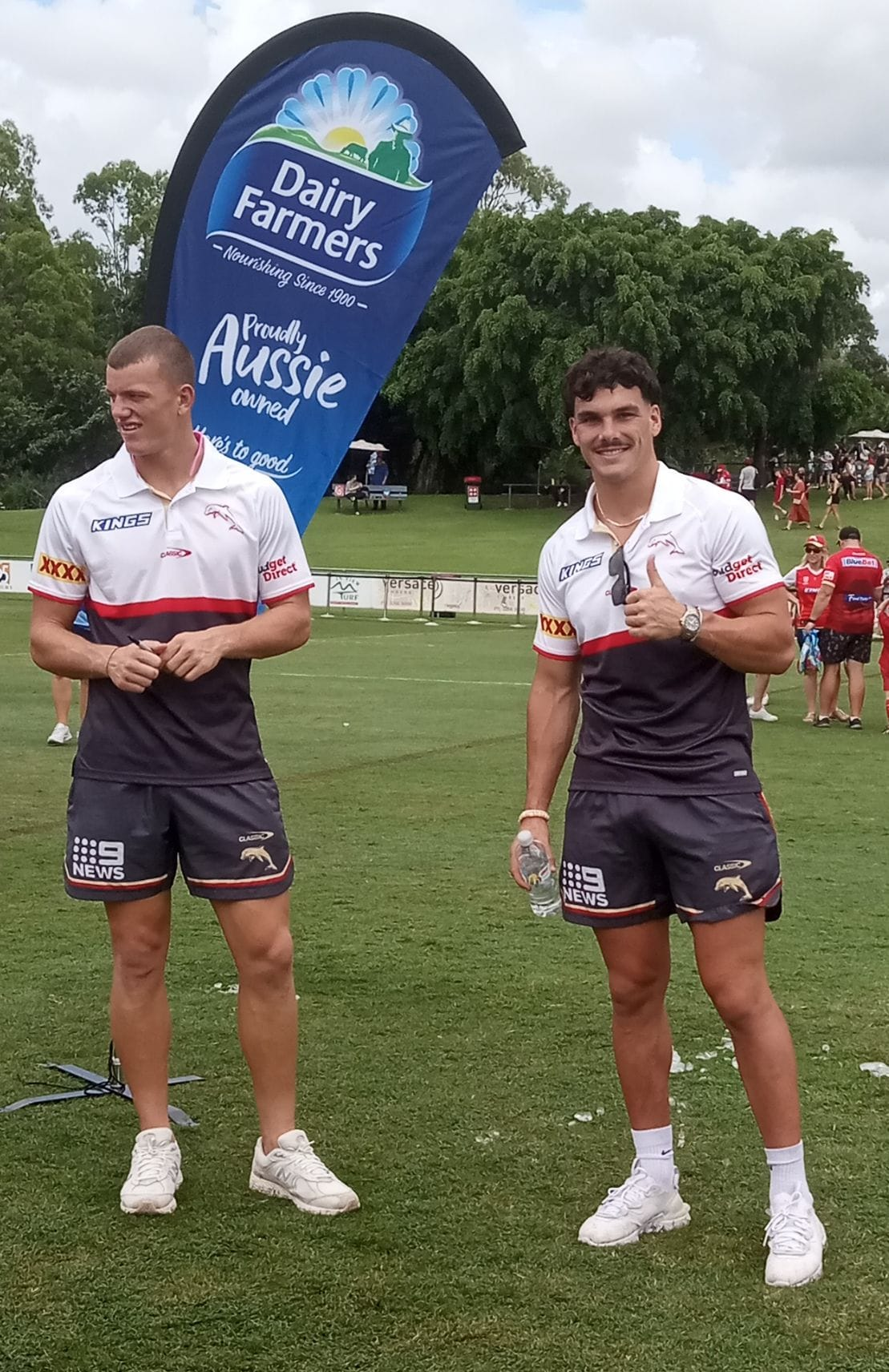
Bostock and Herbie Farnworth on right

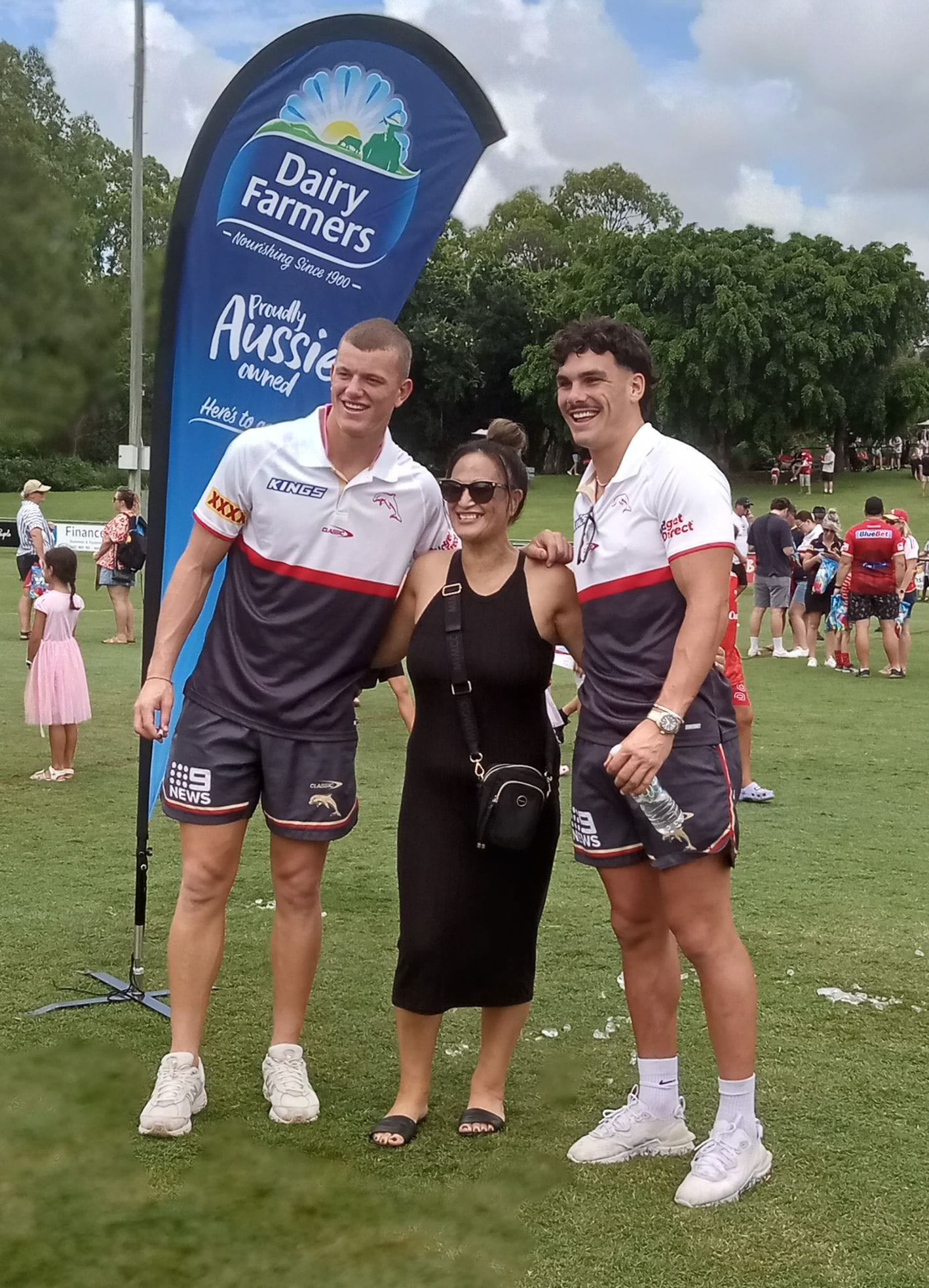
Bostock and Herbie Farnworth in 2024

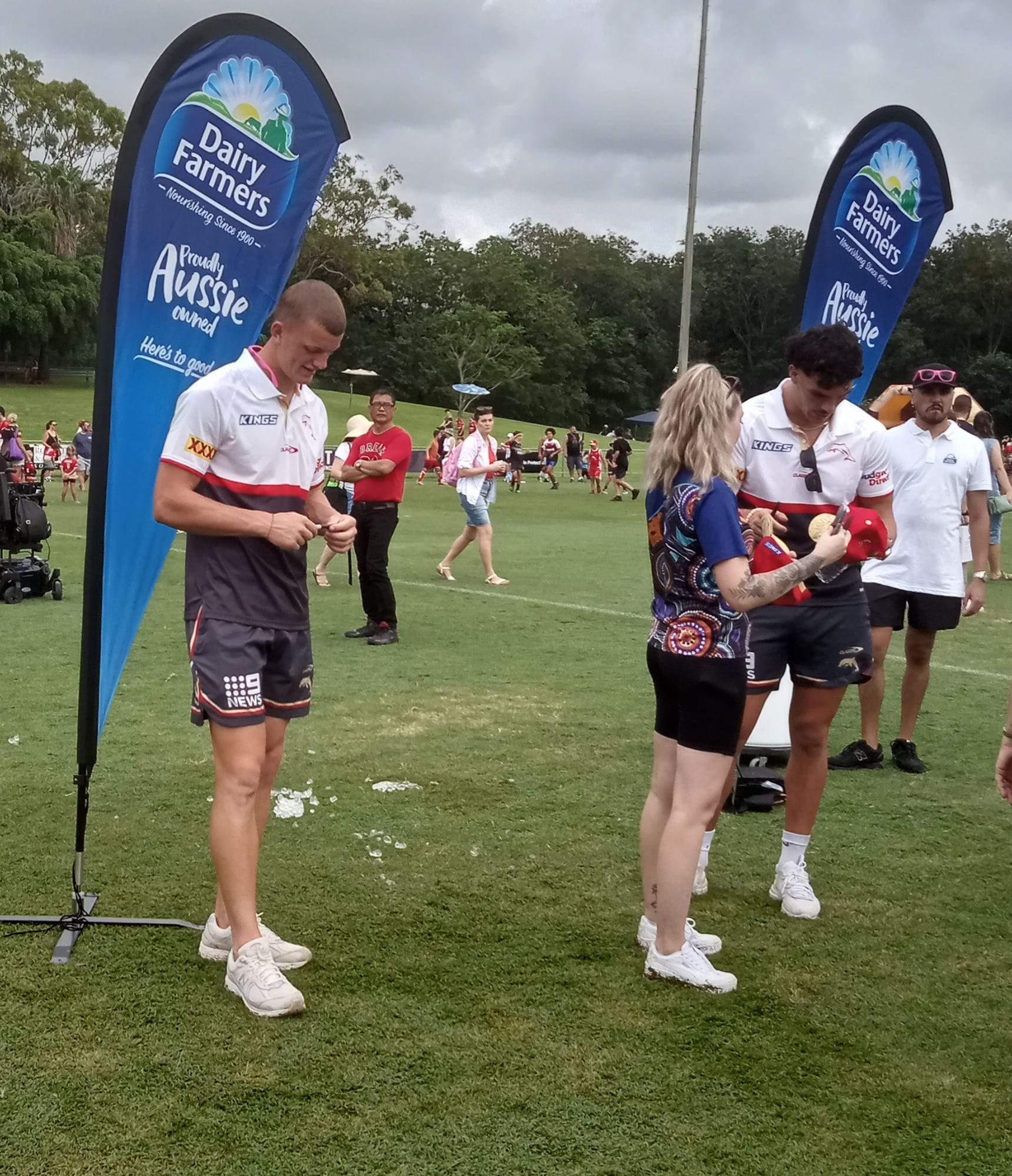
Bostock on left

== Statistics ==
Year	Team	Games	Tries	Pts
2023	Dolphins	4	2	8
2024	Dolphins	23	14	56
2025	Dolphins	13	9	36
2026	Dolphins	16	6	24
2027	Dolphins			
	Totals	56	31	124

== Achievements and honours ==
Individual

Dolphins Rookie of the Year: 2024

Dally M Rookie of the Year: 2024

World Cup Final Man of the Match: 2026

Team

State of Origin Series Winner: 2026

Rugby League World Cup Champion: 2026
