= 2026 Dolphins (NRL) season =

2026 NRL rugby league season

2026 Dolphins season
- NRL Rank: 3rd
- Play-off result: Qualified for preliminary final
- 2026 record: Wins: 17; losses: 7
- Points scored: For: 662; against: 506 (Rd 27)

Team information
- CEO: Terry Reader
- Head Coach: Kristian Woolf
- Captain: Tom Gilbert (Rds 1–16, 18–23, Finals Week 1) Isaiya Katoa (Rds 1–15, 17, 22–27, Finals Weeks 1 and 3) Felise Kaufusi (Rd 18) Kodi Nikorima (Rd 20)
- Stadium: Suncorp Stadium, Kayo Stadium
- High attendance: 52,286 (Roosters, 25 September)

Top scorers
- Tries: Jamayne Isaako (23), Selwyn Cobbo (17), Herbie Farnworth (15), Hamiso Tabuai-Fidow (14) (Finals Week 3)
- Goals: Jamayne Isaako (109) (Finals Week 3)
← 2025	List of seasons	2027 →

The 2026 Dolphins season was the Dolphins club's fourth season and their first finals appearance in the National Rugby League (NRL) competition in Australia. On 12 September, they defeated the New Zealand Warriors 26-16 at Go Media Stadium in finals week 1 and qualified for a preliminary final, losing 20-36 to the Sydney Roosters at Suncorp Stadium on Friday 25 September. In this match (his 98th and last for the Dolphins club), Jamayne Isaako scored 12 points to finish on 310 points (including the finals series) and became the fourth player in NRL history to score at least 300 points in a single season.

During the regular 2026 season, the Dolphins won a total of seventeen matches including two consecutive (15 - 21 March), eight consecutive (1 May – 27 June) and a further seven consecutive (19 July - 4 September). Their biggest loss to date was to the Cronulla Sutherland Sharks (66-0) in round 19 at Kayo Stadium. In round 23 at Suncorp Stadium, the Dolphins won the Battle for Brisbane (40-32) and effectively ended the Brisbane Broncos chances of a finals berth.

In the following round, the Dolphins qualified for the 2026 NRL finals series. At the end of the regular season, they finished third on the competition ladder. Also in round 24, Jamayne Isaako scored 1000 club points for the fewest NRL games (93); this broke the 1981 record (98) of Michael Cronin (Parramatta Eels). At season end, Isaako was the 2026 top points (288) scorer in the NRL.

The Dolphins won their first ever finals game on 13 September against the Warriors at Mount Smart, Auckland, progressing to their first ever preliminary final, a home game against the Sydney Roosters at Suncorp Stadium on 25 September. They lost to the Roosters 36-20, ending their second eight-game winning streak of the year and their finals campaign. At the 2026 Dally M Awards, in addition to Jamayne Isaako winning top NRL point scorer for the second consecutive year, Selwyn Cobbo and Herbie Farnworth were named in the NRL Team of the Year as winger and centre respectively.

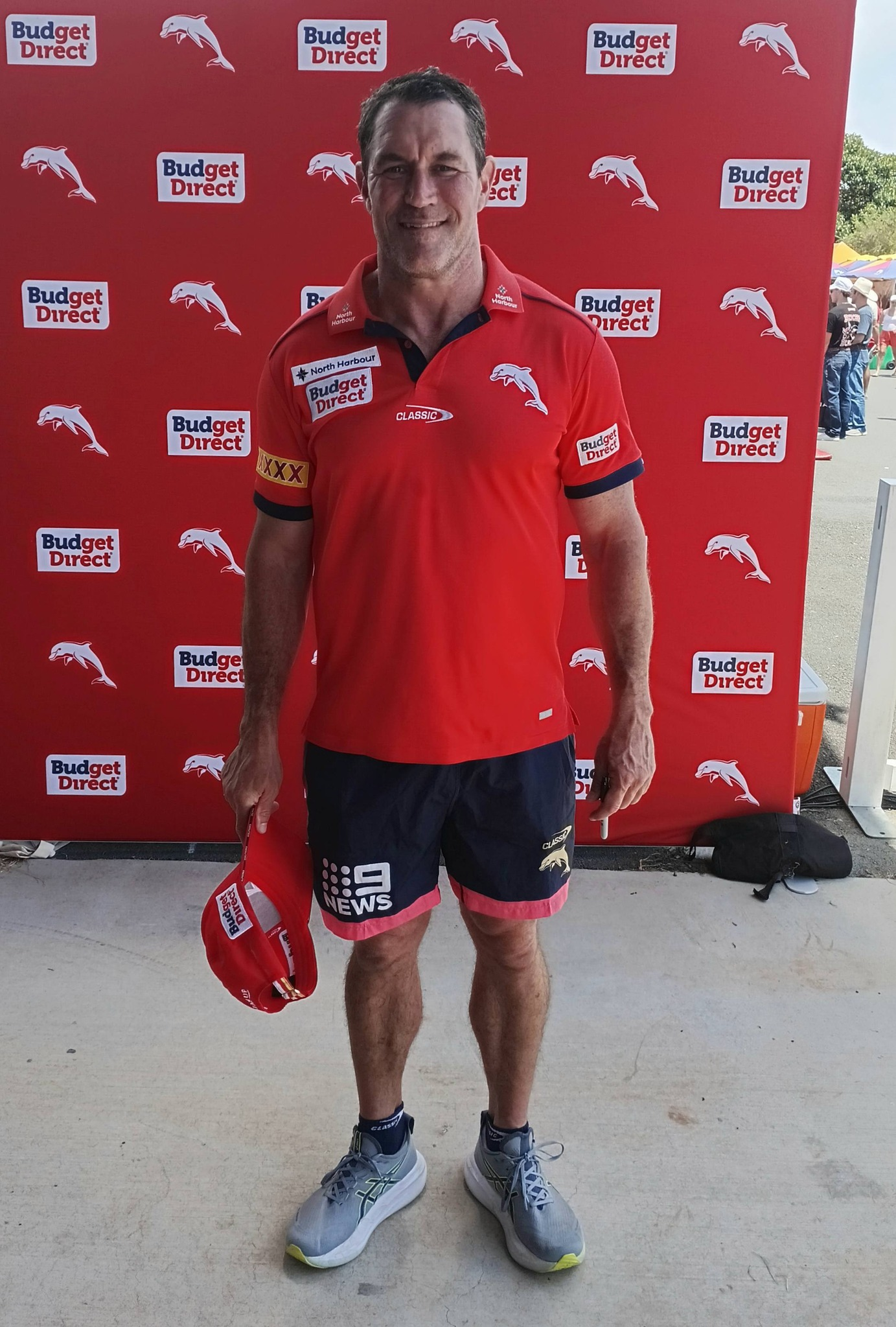
Dolphins NRL head coach Kristian Woolf

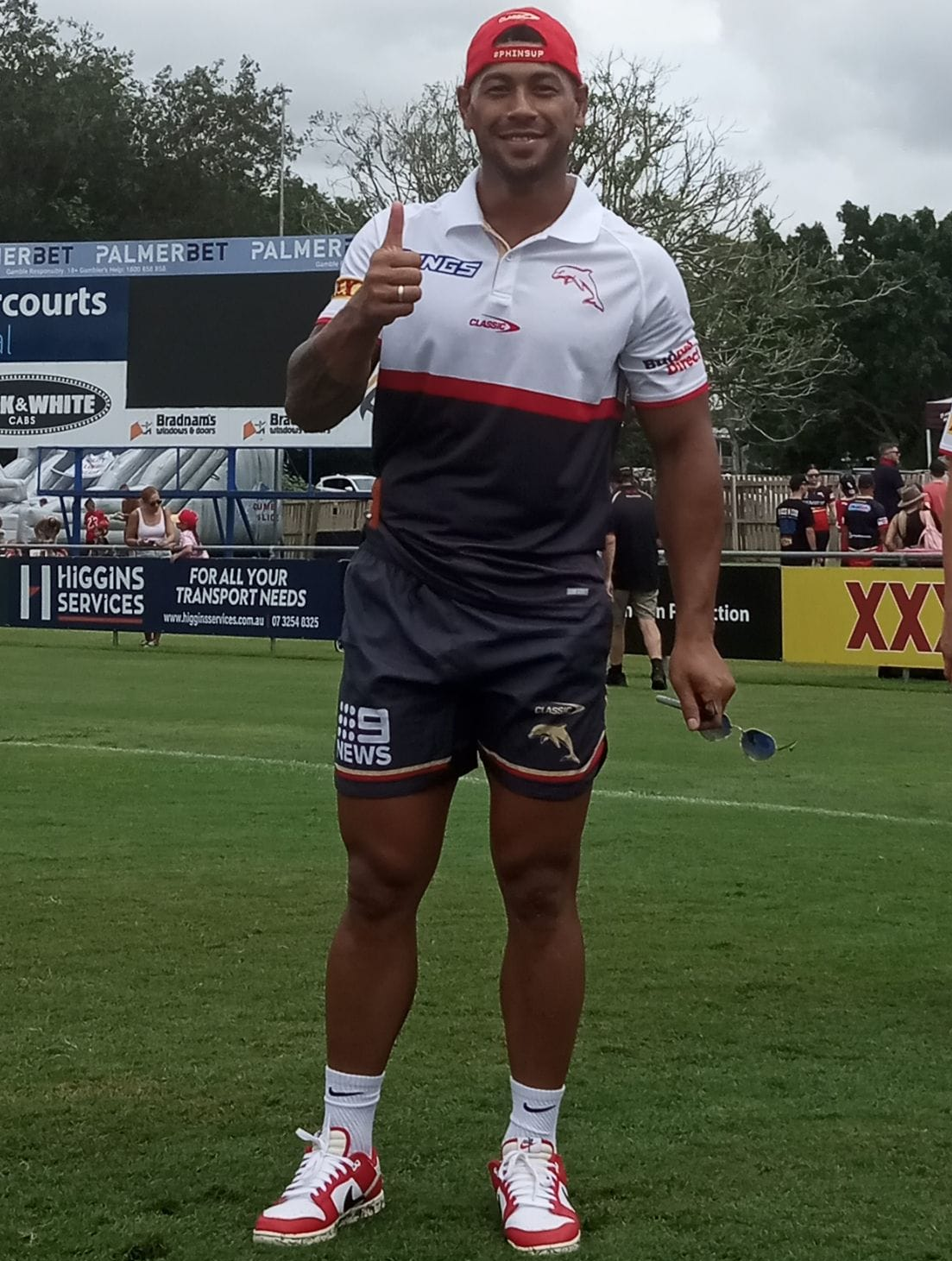
Jamayne Isaako

== Player movement ==
The following player movements happened across the previous season and off-season.

=== Gains ===
Player	Previous club	Length
Morgan Knowles	St Helens	2027
Selwyn Cobbo	Brisbane Broncos	2027
Brad Schneider	Penrith Panthers	2026

=== Losses ===
Player	New Club
Josh Kerr	St. George Illawarra Dragons
Mark Nicholls	Retired
Kenny Bromwich	Retired
Harrison Graham	Newcastle Knights
Aublix Tawha	Brisbane Broncos
Sean O'Sullivan	Canterbury-Bankstown Bulldogs
Ryan Jackson	Released
James Walsh	North Queensland Cowboys

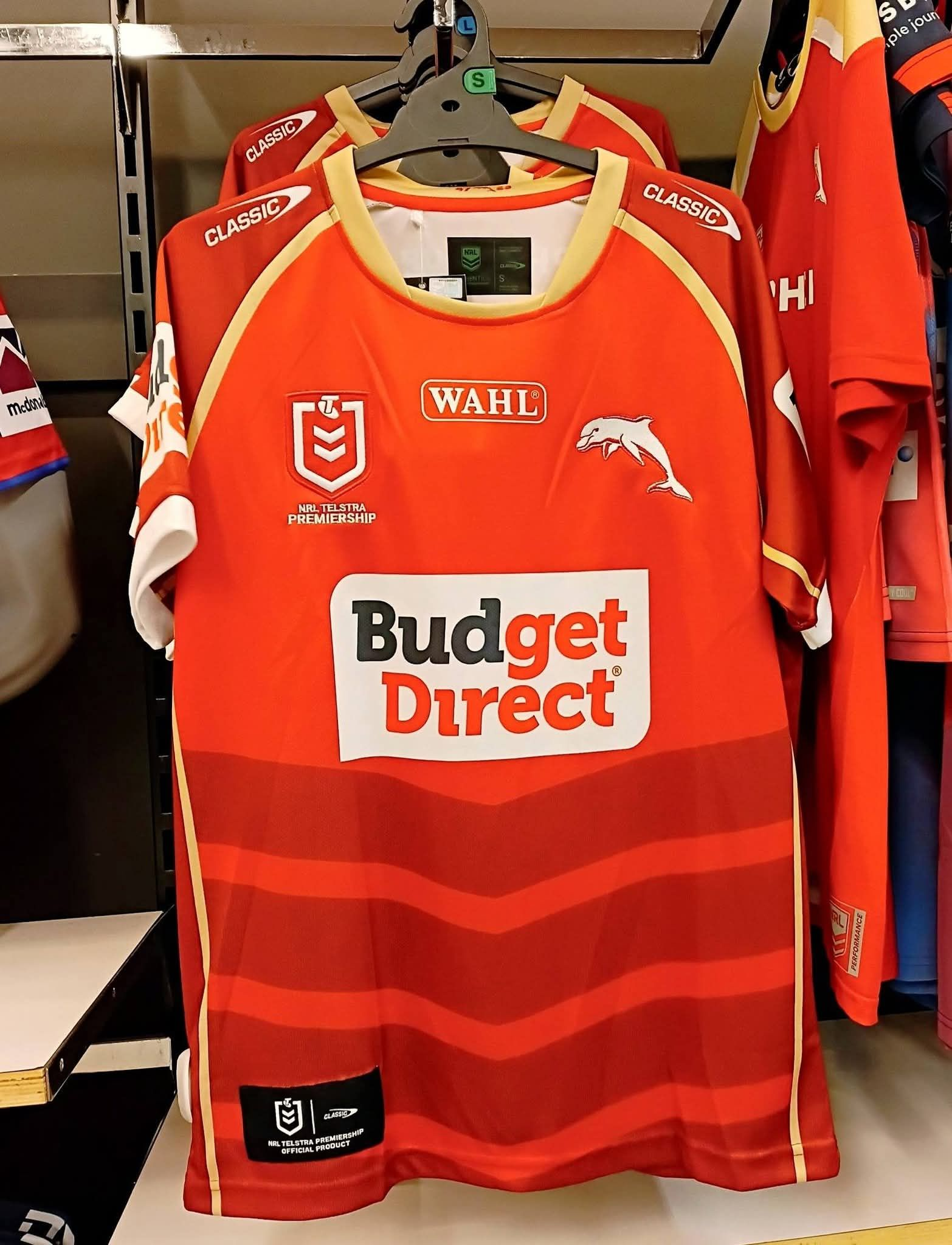
Dolphins NRL 2026 home jersey

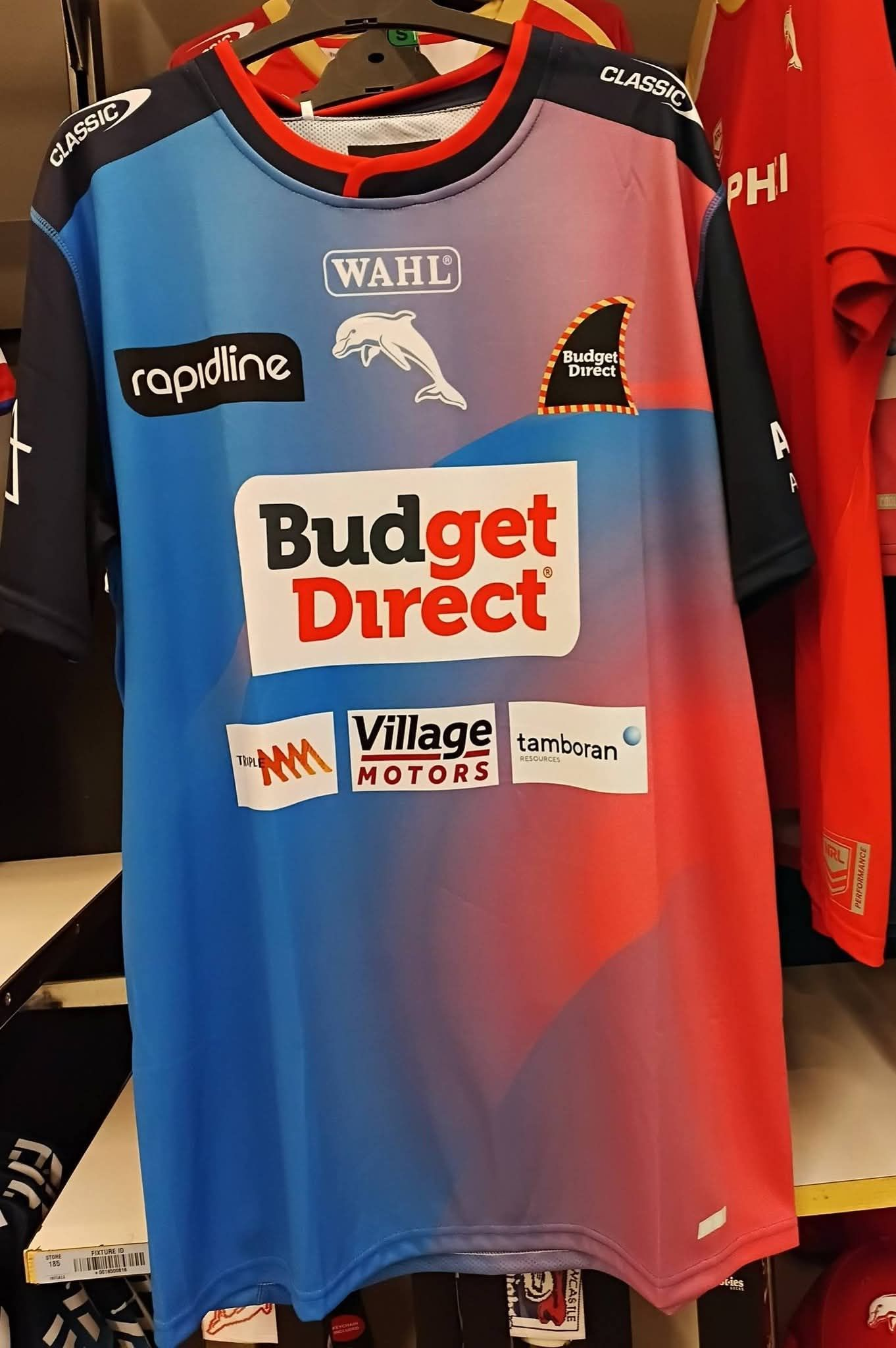
Dolphins 2026 training tee shirt

== Pre-season challenge ==
The Dolphins played in the 2026 NRL Pre-season Challenge in February, prior to the commencement of the regular 2026 NRL season in March.

Game 1: 12 February 2026	Dolphins	12–24	Gold Coast Titans	Redcliffe
19:00 AEST (UTC+10:00)				Stadium: Kayo Stadium

Game 2: 20 February 2026	New Zealand Warriors	34–38	Dolphins	Sydney
18:00 AEDT (UTC+11:00)				Stadium: Leichhardt Oval

== Regular season ==
=== Ladder ===
Pos	Team	Pld	W	D	L	B	PF	PA	PD	Pts	Qualification
1	Penrith Panthers	24	18	0	6	3	683	347	+336	42	Advance to finals series
2	New Zealand Warriors	24	18	0	6	3	728	418	+310	42	Advance to finals series
3	Dolphins	24	17	0	7	3	662	506	+156	40	Advance to finals series
4	Sydney Roosters (P)	24	16	0	8	3	619	501	+118	38	Advance to finals series
5	Cronulla-Sutherland Sharks	24	14	0	10	3	672	523	+149	34	Advance to finals series
6	South Sydney Rabbitohs	24	14	0	10	3	694	581	+113	34	Advance to finals series
7	Newcastle Knights	24	14	0	10	3	633	591	+42	34	Advance to finals series
8	North Queensland Cowboys	24	13	0	11	3	568	652	−84	32	Advance to finals series
9	Manly Warringah Sea Eagles	24	11	0	13	3	623	524	+99	28	
10	Melbourne Storm	24	11	0	13	3	594	576	+18	28	
11	Canberra Raiders	24	11	0	13	3	581	626	−45	28	
12	Canterbury-Bankstown Bulldogs	24	11	0	13	3	476	536	−60	28	
13	Parramatta Eels	24	9	0	15	3	497	678	−181	24	
14	Brisbane Broncos	24	8	0	16	3	471	677	−206	22	
15	Wests Tigers	24	8	0	16	3	445	699	−254	22	
16	Gold Coast Titans	24	6	0	18	3	477	663	−186	18	
17	St. George Illawarra Dragons	24	5	0	19	3	392	717	−325	16	

Source: National Rugby League
Rules for classification: 1) competition points; 2) points differential; 3) percentage; (Note: Greater percentage of points scored for and against, being determined by points scored for divided by points scored against expressed as a percentage.) 4) tries scored; (Note: Further tiebreakers (in order) include goals scored, field goals kicked; least amount of penalties conceded.)
(P) Premiers

=== Results by round ===
Round	1	2	3	4	5	6	7	8	9	10	11	12	13	14	15	16	17	18	19	20	21	22	23	24	25	26	27
Ground	H	H	A	A	H	-	H	A	H	H	A	A	–	A	H	A	H	A	H	H	–	A	H	A	H	A	A
Result	L	W	W	L	L	B	L	L	W	W	W	W	B	W	W	W	W	L	L	W	B	W	W	W	W	W	W
Position	12	9	6	8	13	12	12	12	11	9	8	8	7	5	4	3	3	5	7	5	5	5	5	4	4	3	3
Points	0	2	4	4	4	6	6	6	8	10	12	14	16	18	20	22	24	24	24	26	28	30	32	34	36	38	40

Source: National Rugby League
A = Away; H = Home; N = Neutral; B = Bye; W = Win; D = Draw; L = Loss

=== Matches ===
The league fixtures were released on 14 November 2025.

Win Draw Loss Fixtures

Round 1: 8 March 2026	Dolphins	30–40	South Sydney Rabbitohs	Brisbane
15:05 AEST (UTC+10:00)				Stadium: Suncorp Stadium

Round 2: 15 March 2026	Dolphins	18–14	Gold Coast Titans	Brisbane
17:15 AEST (UTC+10:00)				Stadium: Suncorp Stadium

Round 3: 21 March 2026	Cronulla-Sutherland Sharks	10–38	Dolphins	Sydney
17:30 AEDT (UTC+11:00)				Stadium: Sharks Stadium

Round 4: 27 March 2026	Brisbane Broncos	26–12	Dolphins	Brisbane
19:00 AEST (UTC+10:00)				Stadium: Suncorp Stadium

Round 5: 2 April 2026	Dolphins	18–52	Manly Warringah Sea Eagles	Redcliffe
19:00 AEST (UTC+10:00)				Stadium: Kayo Stadium

Round 6 (Bye for Dolphins)

Round 7: 17 April 2026	Dolphins	22–23	Penrith Panthers	Darwin
19:30 ACST (UTC+09:30)				Stadium: TIO Stadium

Round 8: 25 April 2026	New Zealand Warriors	20–18	Dolphins	Wellington
20:05 NZST (UTC+12:00)	Tries: Khan-Pereira 3', 28'; Watene-Zelezniak 25'; Tuaupiki 61'; Goals: Boyd 5', 63' (2/4)	Report	Tries: Farnworth 10'; Isaako 17', 19'; Goals: Isaako 11', 18', 21' (3/3); Sin bin: Flegler (yellow card) 63' to 73'	Stadium: Hnry Stadium; Attendance: 34,812; Referee: Liam Kennedy

Round 9: 1 May 2026	Dolphins	28-10	Melbourne Storm	Brisbane
20:00 AEST (UTC+10:00)				Stadium: Suncorp Stadium

Round 10: 7 May 2026	Dolphins	44-12	Canterbury-Bankstown Bulldogs	Brisbane
19:50 AEST (UTC+10:00)				Stadium: Suncorp Stadium

Round 11: 15 May 2026	South Sydney Rabbitohs	10-32	Dolphins	Brisbane
20:00 AEST (UTC+10:00)				Stadium: Suncorp Stadium

Round 12: 21 May 2026	Canberra Raiders	22-30	Dolphins	Canberra
19:50 AEST (UTC+10:00)				Stadium: GIO Stadium

Round 13 (Bye for Dolphins)

Round 14: 6 June 2026	North Queensland Cowboys	14-40	Dolphins	Townsville
17:30 AEST (UTC+10:00)				Stadium: Queensland Country Bank Stadium

Round 15: 12 June 2026	Dolphins	48-10	Sydney Roosters	Brisbane
20:00 AEST (UTC+10:00)				Stadium: Suncorp Stadium

Round 16: 20 June 2026	Wests Tigers	22-36	Dolphins	Sydney
15:00 AEST (UTC+10:00)				Stadium: Campbelltown Sports Stadium

Round 17: 27 June 2026	Dolphins	26-24	New Zealand Warriors	Brisbane
15:00 AEST (UTC+10:00)				Stadium: Suncorp Stadium

Round 18: 5 July 2026	Newcastle Knights	13-12	Dolphins	Newcastle
16:05 AEST (UTC+10:00)				Stadium: McDonald Jones Stadium

Round 19: 11 July 2026	Dolphins	0-66	Cronulla-Sutherland Sharks	Redcliffe
15:00 AEST (UTC+10:00)				Stadium: Kayo Stadium

Round 20: 19 July 2026	Dolphins	36-16	North Queensland Cowboys	Brisbane
16:05 AEST (UTC+10:00)				Stadium: Suncorp Stadium

Round 21 (Bye for Dolphins)

Round 22: 31 July 2026	St. George Illawarra Dragons	22-28	Dolphins	Wollongong
18:00 AEST (UTC+10:00)				Stadium: WIN Stadium

Round 23: 8 August 2026	Dolphins	40-32	Brisbane Broncos	Brisbane
17:30 AEST (UTC+10:00)				Stadium: Suncorp Stadium

Round 24: 14 August 2026	Manly Warringah Sea Eagles	0-22	Dolphins	Sydney
18:00 AEST (UTC+10:00)				Stadium: 4 Pines Park

Round 25: 21 August 2026	Dolphins	34-16	Parramatta Eels	Brisbane
20:00 AEST (UTC+10:00)				Stadium: Suncorp Stadium

Round 26: 29 August 2026	Sydney Roosters	12-26	Dolphins	Sydney
17:30 AEST (UTC+10:00)				Stadium: Allianz Stadium

Round 27: 4 September 2026	Gold Coast Titans	20-24	Dolphins	Gold Coast
18:00 AEST (UTC+10:00)				Stadium: Cbus Super Stadium

== Finals series ==
Qualifying and elimination finals
13 September – Sydney
1	Penrith	19
4	Sydney	12
12 September – Sydney
5	Cronulla-Sutherland	26
8	North Queensland	16
11 September – Sydney
6	South Sydney	10
7	Newcastle	20
12 September – Auckland
2	New Zealand	16
3	Dolphins	26

Semi-finals
19 September – Sydney
Sydney	46
Cronulla-Sutherland	10
20 September – Auckland
New Zealand	10
Newcastle	12

Preliminary finals
27 September – Sydney
Penrith	14
Newcastle	22
25 September – Brisbane
Dolphins	20
Sydney	36

Grand final
4 October – Sydney
Newcastle	18
Sydney	19

== 2026 squad ==
Dolphins 2026 squad
Top 30 squad – 2026 NRL season			Supplementary list	Coaching staff
Jake Averillo – CE; Jack Bostock – CE; Selwyn Cobbo – WG; Kurt Donoghoe – HK; Herbie Farnworth – CE; Kulikefu Finefeuiaki – SR; Thomas Flegler – PR; Trai Fuller – FB; Tom Gilbert (c) – PR; Jamayne Isaako – WG	Isaiya Katoa (c) – HB; Felise Kaufusi (vc) – PR; Oryn Keeley – SR; Morgan Knowles – LK; Connelly Lemuelu – SR; Jeremy Marshall-King – HK; Francis Molo – PR; Tevita Naufahu – WG; Kodi Nikorima – FE; LJ Nonu – WG	Max Plath – HK; Brian Pouniu – CE; Elijah Rasmussen – PR; Brad Schneider – FE, HK; Ray Stone – LK; Sebastian Su'a – PR; Hamiso Tabuai-Fidow – FB	Charlie Dickson – LK; John Fineanganofo – HK; Zac Garton – SR; Patrick Kailahi – SR; Lewis Symonds – LK; Extended squad: Brent Woolf – HK; Tyreece Tait – WG	Head coach: Kristian Woolf; Assistant coaches: Nathan Fien; Rory Kostjasyn; Ben Woolf; Jeremy Hickmans (Head of Performance); Blake Duncan (Athletic Performance Coach); Elliot Jackson (Athletic Performance Coach); Medical professionals: Adam Schumacher (Physiotherapist); John Davey (Head of Sports Science & Performance Analysis); Legend: (c) Captain(s); (vc) Vice-captain(s); Development players; Extended squad; Updated: 6 November 2026; Source(s):
