= Dolphins (NRL) =

Australian rugby league football club, based in Brisbane

Club information
- Full name: Dolphins NRL Limited
- Colours: Red; Gold; White
- Founded: 2023
- Website: dolphinsnrl.com.au

Current details
- Grounds: Suncorp Stadium (52,500); Kayo Stadium (10,000); Sunshine Coast Stadium (10,000); TIO Stadium (12,215)
- CEO: Terry Reader
- Coach: Kristian Woolf
- Captain: Tom Gilbert & Isaiya Katoa
- Competition: National Rugby League
- 2026 season: 3rd
- Current season

Uniforms
Home colours	Away colours

Records
- Premierships: 0
- Runners-up: 0
- Minor premierships: 0
- Wooden spoons: 0
- Most capped: 98 – Jamayne Isaako
- Highest try scorer: 70 – Jamayne Isaako
- Highest points scorer: 1055 – Jamayne Isaako

The Dolphins are a professional rugby league football team that have competed in the National Rugby League (NRL) since 2023. Based in Redcliffe, Queensland, the Dolphins play most of their home games at Suncorp Stadium in Brisbane. In their fourth season (2026), the Dolphins finished third on the ladder, qualified for the finals series for the first time, and won their first finals match before losing the preliminary final to the Sydney Roosters.

The Redcliffe Dolphins were founded in 1947 and currently play in the Queensland Cup. Redcliffe had long held ambitions of competing at the national level. In 2007, the club successfully sued a Gold Coast NRL bid to prevent it from taking the name "Dolphins". In 2020, the NRL announced that a 17th side would be entered into the competition. The bid led by Redcliffe was announced as the winner in 2021, and the Dolphins played their inaugural NRL season in 2023, finishing in 13th position. The NRL Dolphins operate under a separate license to the Redcliffe Dolphins. The two teams share Kayo Stadium, but have separate team logos and colours (the Queensland Cup side colours are red and white, while the NRL team's colours are red, white and gold).

Officially, the Dolphins represent the northern corridor of Brisbane and South East Queensland, including the Moreton Bay Region and the Sunshine Coast.

The Dolphins are the third NRL team to be based in South-East Queensland, including the Brisbane Broncos (with whom they compete in the Battle for Brisbane), and the Gold Coast Titans (who were the last team to join the NRL before the Dolphins). They are the fourth Queensland NRL side, including the North Queensland Cowboys.

== History ==
In 2020, coinciding with the opening of a new Moreton Daily Stadium (known commercially as Kayo Stadium from 7 December 2022), the Redcliffe Dolphins launched a bid on 22 September 2020 for the inclusion of a separate new team in the national competition.

=== Granting of NRL licence (2021) ===
On 13 October 2021, the 17th NRL licence was granted to the Dolphins after they competed for it against two other consortiums (the Brisbane Firehawks and Brisbane Jets) also linked to existing Queensland Cup clubs. Wayne Bennett was signed as the NRL team's first head coach. On 26 November 2021, the Dolphins made their first major signing for their 2023 entry, recruiting Felise Kaufusi from the Melbourne Storm. Not long after, he was joined by Storm team mates, Jesse Bromwich (who was named as the Dolphins inaugural team captain in February 2023) and his brother Kenny Bromwich. Although separately licensed, the Dolphins NRL venture is owned by the Redcliffe Dolphins and is its fully professional spin-off club.

In December 2021, it was confirmed that Queensland Rugby League (QRL) team the Central Queensland Capras had secured a full affiliation deal with the Dolphins. The Capras and Dolphins deal should see up to six Dolphins NRL players compete for the Capras in the Queensland Cup competition each week. In May 2022, the PNG Hunters announced a strategic pathways partnership with the Dolphins that includes full NRL pre-season participation for four young Papua New Guinean players, beginning in the PNGNRL Digicel Cup, through to the PNG Hunters in the QRL state competition and then directly into the Australian NRL system.

=== Wayne Bennett era (2023–24) ===
On 7 November 2022, pre-season training for 2023 began. Pre-season trial matches were played against the Central Queensland Capras at Marley Brown Oval in Gladstone on 4 February 2023 (the Dolphins won 24–8), against the North Queensland Cowboys at Barlow Park in Cairns on 12 February (the Dolphins drew 22–22), and the Gold Coast Titans on 19 February at Kayo Stadium (the Titans won 40–16).

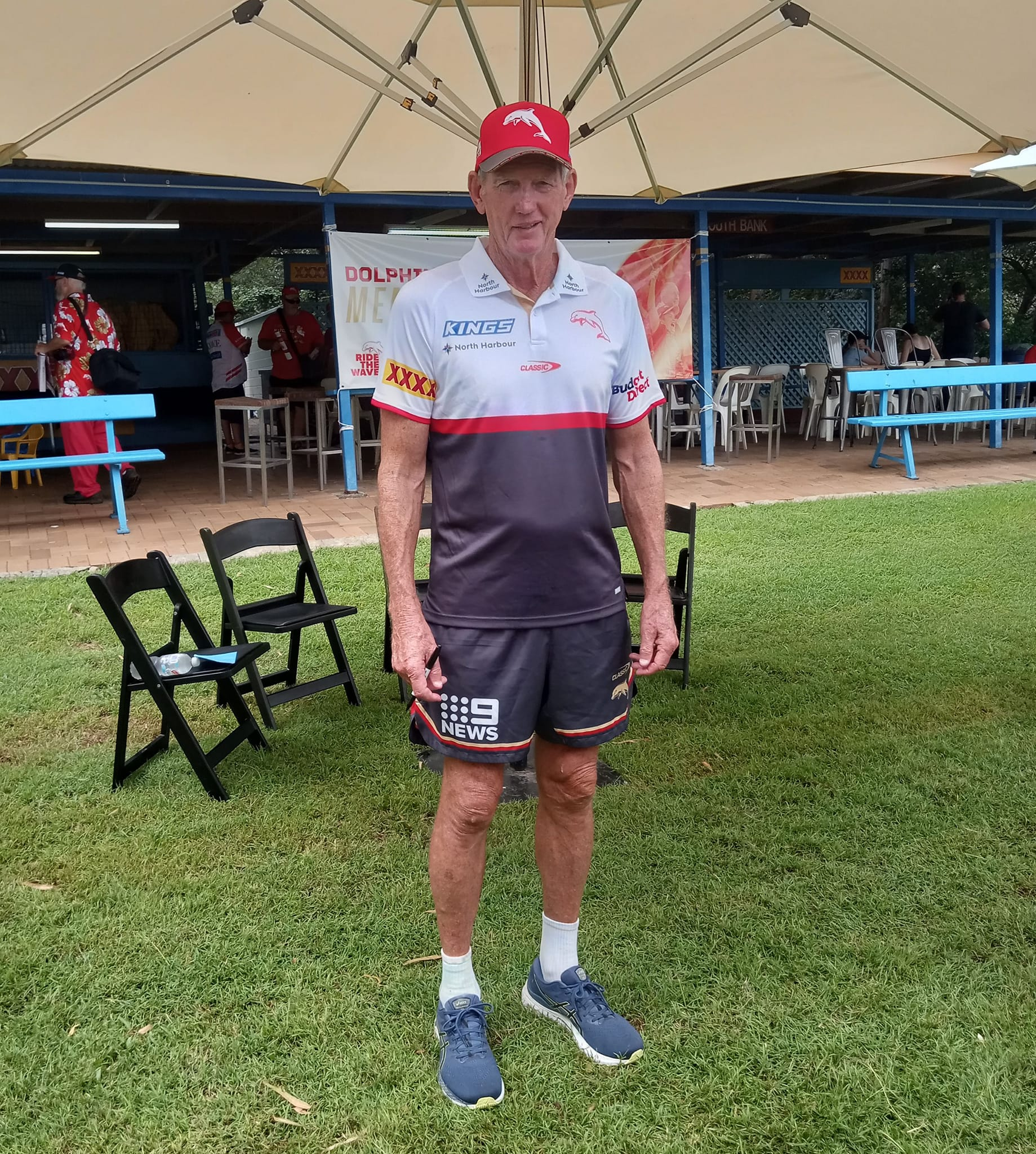
Dolphins NRL inaugural head coach (2023–24) Wayne Bennett

The Dolphins' first NRL match was against the Sydney Roosters on 5 March 2023 at Suncorp Stadium, Brisbane to honour rugby league Immortal Arthur Beetson, a former player and coach of both the Redcliffe Dolphins and the Roosters. The Dolphins won 28–18 in front of a crowd of 32,177 fans. Jesse Bromwich captained the side. Hamiso Tabuai-Fidow scored the Dolphins' first points with a try. Subsequent points were added by Mark Nicholls (one try), Connelly Lemuelu (one try) and Jamayne Isaako (two tries and four conversion goals). The Artie Legacy Medal for player of the match was awarded to Felise Kaufusi. Prior to NRL Round 7 2023, the combined leading try-scorers for the Dolphins were Jamayne Isaako and Hamiso Tabuai-Fidow, both on eight tries.

In round 3 of the 2023 NRL season, Tesi Niu became the first player in the Dolphins NRL history to score a hat-trick when they defeated the Newcastle Knights 36–20 at McDonald Jones Stadium. After winning their first three NRL matches, the Dolphins hosted their first Battle for Brisbane derby in Round 4 at Suncorp Stadium on Friday 24 March 2023 and were defeated 18–12 by the Brisbane Broncos. On Friday 7 April 2023 in the Dolphins' round 6 victory 32–22 against the North Queensland Cowboys at Queensland Country Bank Stadium, Hamiso Tabuai-Fidow equalled a 115-year-old NRL record, scoring tries in six straight matches for a new club. In round 8 on 23 April 2023, the Dolphins equalled the greatest comeback in premiership history to defeat the Gold Coast Titans 28–26 at Suncorp Stadium, after trailing the Titans 26–0 after the first twenty-six minutes. The record for a winning comeback in premiership history dating to 1908 was set in 1998, when the North Queensland Cowboys went from being down 26–0 to defeating the Penrith Panthers 36–28 at full-time.

In Round 9 of the 2023 NRL season, the Dolphins played their first golden point game but lost 30–31 to the Canberra Raiders at McDonalds Park, Wagga Wagga. The NRL later conceded that match officials missed a crucial knock-on call late in Canberra's golden-point victory when the former regained possession after knocking the ball into the arm of a Dolphins' player. "The NRL's head of football Graham Annesley said referee Peter Gough was obscured in his view of the knock on, but the sideline officials should have pulled the play up." Nevertheless, Annesley advised that no policy changes could be considered until the current season is over.

In Round 13 of the 2023 NRL season, an illegal try on the seventh tackle of a set was awarded to the St George Illawarra Dragons in their 26–12 loss to the Dolphins at Kayo Stadium; the decision would not have been overturned even if the Dolphins had lost the game.

By the end of the Dolphins' inaugural season, goal-kicking winger Jamayne Isaako recorded both the highest number of NRL tries and points in the 2023 competition; a feat last achieved by Canberra Raiders goal-kicking centre Mal Meninga in 1990. At the Dolphins' Inaugural Presentation Ball held at the Brisbane Convention & Exhibition Centre in September 2023, Isaako was awarded the Arthur Beetson Medal Player of the Year as well as the Best Back, the Most Consistent, and the Players' Player awards.

In round 15 of the 2024 NRL season, the Dolphins achieved their first-ever win in Sydney when they defeated the Cronulla-Sutherland Sharks 30–28 at PointsBet Stadium. After three previous defeats to the Brisbane Broncos, the Dolphins won the Battle for Brisbane derby 40–6 in round 26 on 31 August 2024 at Suncorp Stadium.

=== Kristian Woolf era (2025–) ===
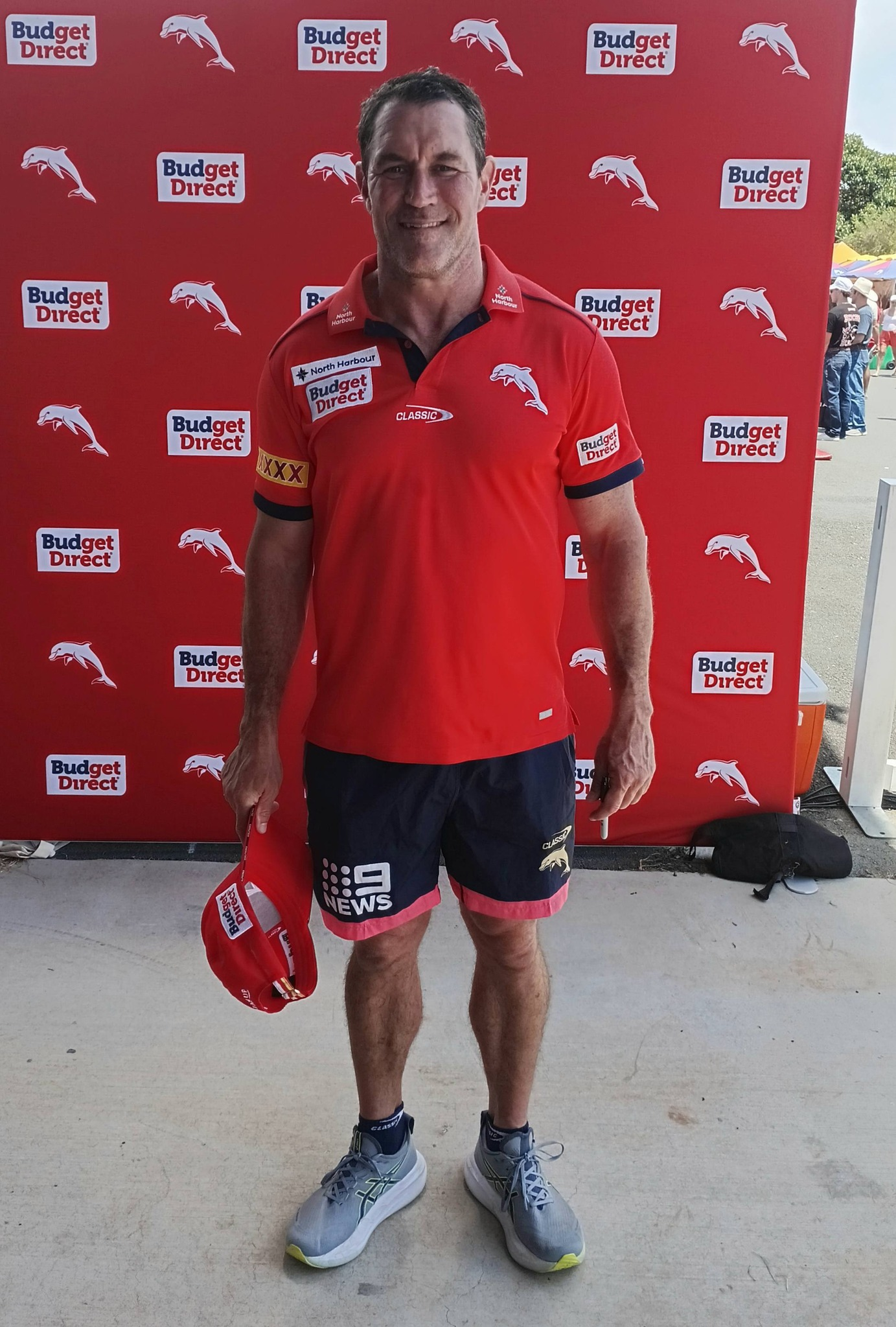
Dolphins NRL head coach Kristian Woolf (2025–)

In 2025, former assistant coach Kristian Woolf succeeded Wayne Bennett as head coach. Woolf's first win was in round 5 against the Gold Coast Titans at Cbus Super Stadium. In round 11 against the New Zealand Warriors at Suncorp Stadium, referee Peter Gough called "play on" after New Zealand looked to have spilt the ball forward; the next play resulted in a converted try worth six points. The Dolphins lost the match by four points. The following week at Accor Stadium, the Dolphins achieved their first ever victory over the Canterbury-Bankstown Bulldogs, 44–8. Consequently, the Dolphins had recorded wins against every team since entering the NRL competition in 2023. In round 14, the Dolphins recorded their largest win by defeating the St George Illawarra Dragons 56–6. This largest winning margin was increased to 58–4 against the North Queensland Cowboys in round 15. This marked their third consecutive large victory margin win for a combined 158 points in just three rounds. Despite finishing the 2025 season in ninth place and missing the finals, the Dolphins scored the most points (721) of any team in the competition, and the most of any non-finals team in the history of the NRL, surpassing the 2001 Melbourne Storm.

In the 2026 NRL season, the Dolphins won eight consecutive matches over two separate periods (1 May – 27 June and 19 July - 12 September). In round 24, Jamayne Isaako scored 1000 club points for the fewest NRL games (93); this broke the 1981 record (98) of Michael Cronin (Parramatta Eels). At the end of the regular season, the Dolphins finished third on the competition ladder and qualified for their first finals berth. On 12 September, they defeated the New Zealand Warriors 26-16 at Go Media Stadium. They proceeded to their first preliminary final, which they lost 20-36 against the Sydney Roosters at Suncorp Stadium on 25 September, ending their second eight-game winning streak and the season.

==== 2026 ladder ====
Pos	Team	Pld	W	D	L	B	PF	PA	PD	Pts	Qualification
1	Penrith Panthers	24	18	0	6	3	683	347	+336	42	Advance to finals series
2	New Zealand Warriors	24	18	0	6	3	728	418	+310	42	Advance to finals series
3	Dolphins	24	17	0	7	3	662	506	+156	40	Advance to finals series
4	Sydney Roosters (P)	24	16	0	8	3	619	501	+118	38	Advance to finals series
5	Cronulla-Sutherland Sharks	24	14	0	10	3	672	523	+149	34	Advance to finals series
6	South Sydney Rabbitohs	24	14	0	10	3	694	581	+113	34	Advance to finals series
7	Newcastle Knights	24	14	0	10	3	633	591	+42	34	Advance to finals series
8	North Queensland Cowboys	24	13	0	11	3	568	652	−84	32	Advance to finals series
9	Manly Warringah Sea Eagles	24	11	0	13	3	623	524	+99	28	
10	Melbourne Storm	24	11	0	13	3	594	576	+18	28	
11	Canberra Raiders	24	11	0	13	3	581	626	−45	28	
12	Canterbury-Bankstown Bulldogs	24	11	0	13	3	476	536	−60	28	
13	Parramatta Eels	24	9	0	15	3	497	678	−181	24	
14	Brisbane Broncos	24	8	0	16	3	471	677	−206	22	
15	Wests Tigers	24	8	0	16	3	445	699	−254	22	
16	Gold Coast Titans	24	6	0	18	3	477	663	−186	18	
17	St. George Illawarra Dragons	24	5	0	19	3	392	717	−325	16	

Source: National Rugby League
Rules for classification: 1) competition points; 2) points differential; 3) percentage; (Note: Greater percentage of points scored for and against, being determined by points scored for divided by points scored against expressed as a percentage.) 4) tries scored; (Note: Further tiebreakers (in order) include goals scored, field goals kicked; least amount of penalties conceded.)
(P) Premiers
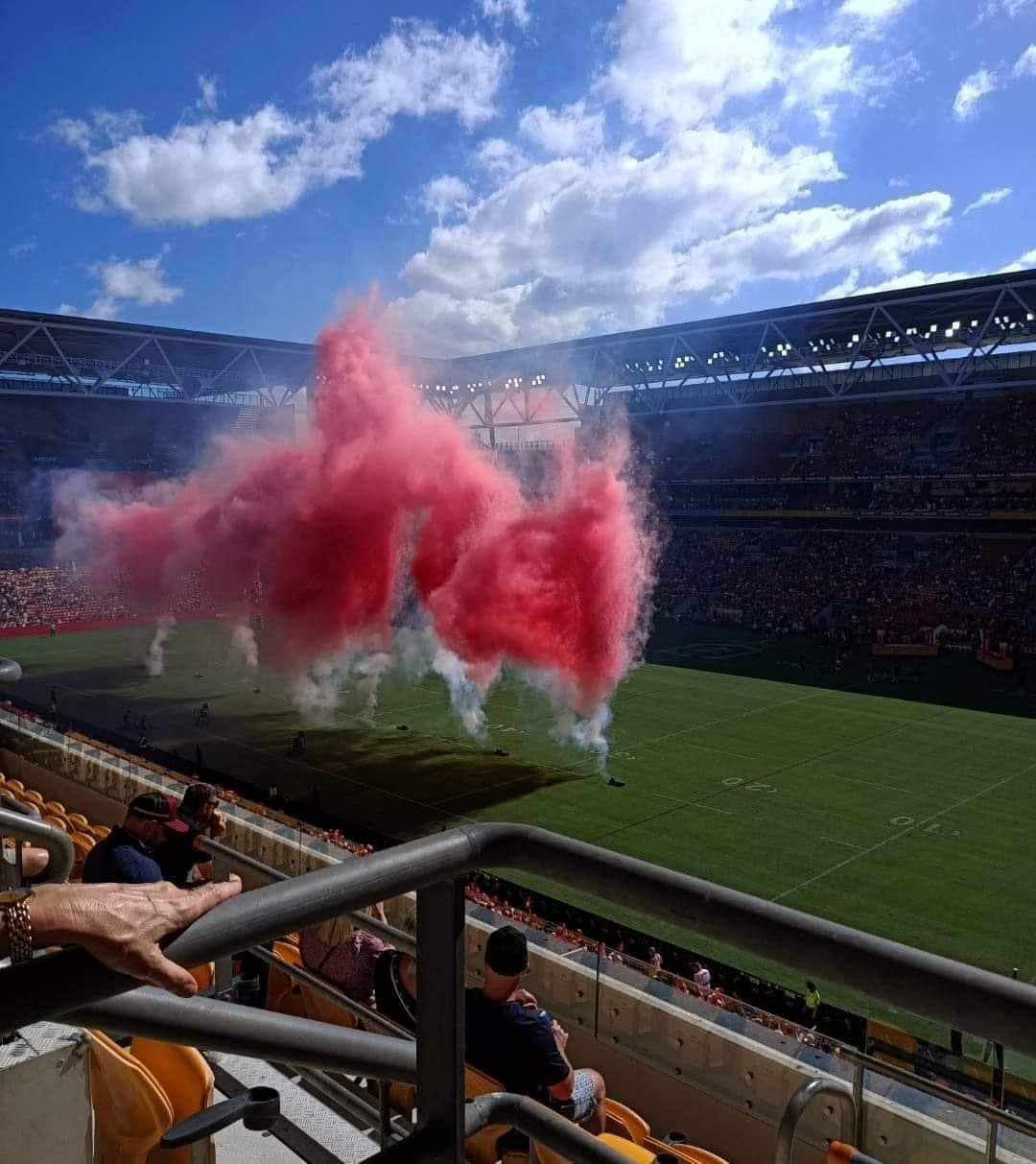
Dolphins flares at Suncorp Stadium

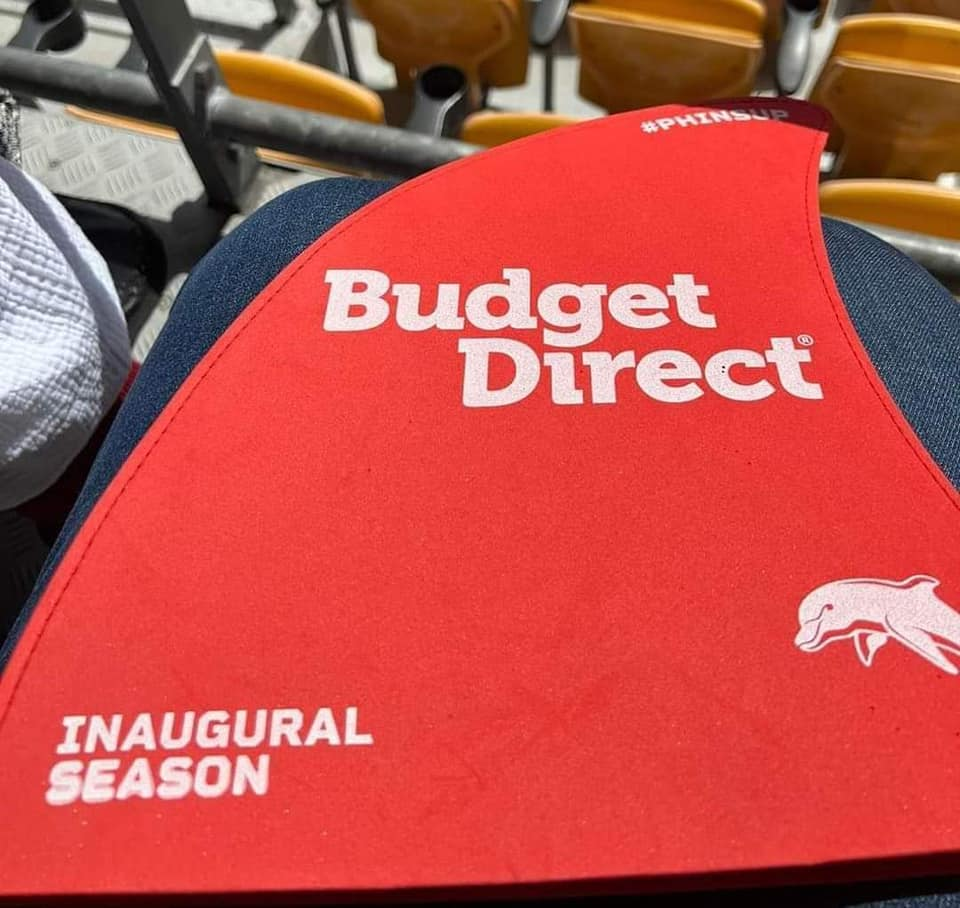
Dolphins supporters' fin headwear

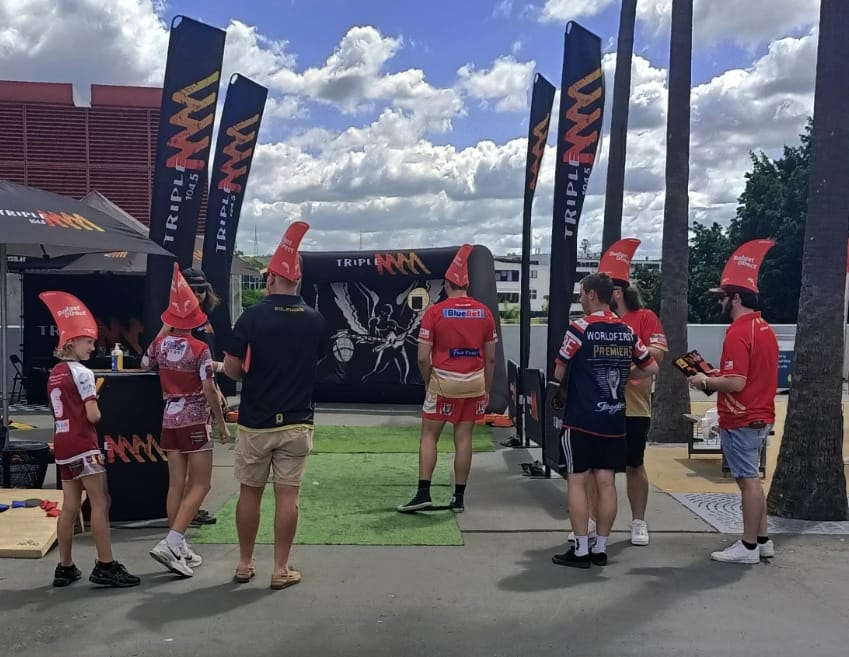
Emblematic dolphin fins on supporters' heads

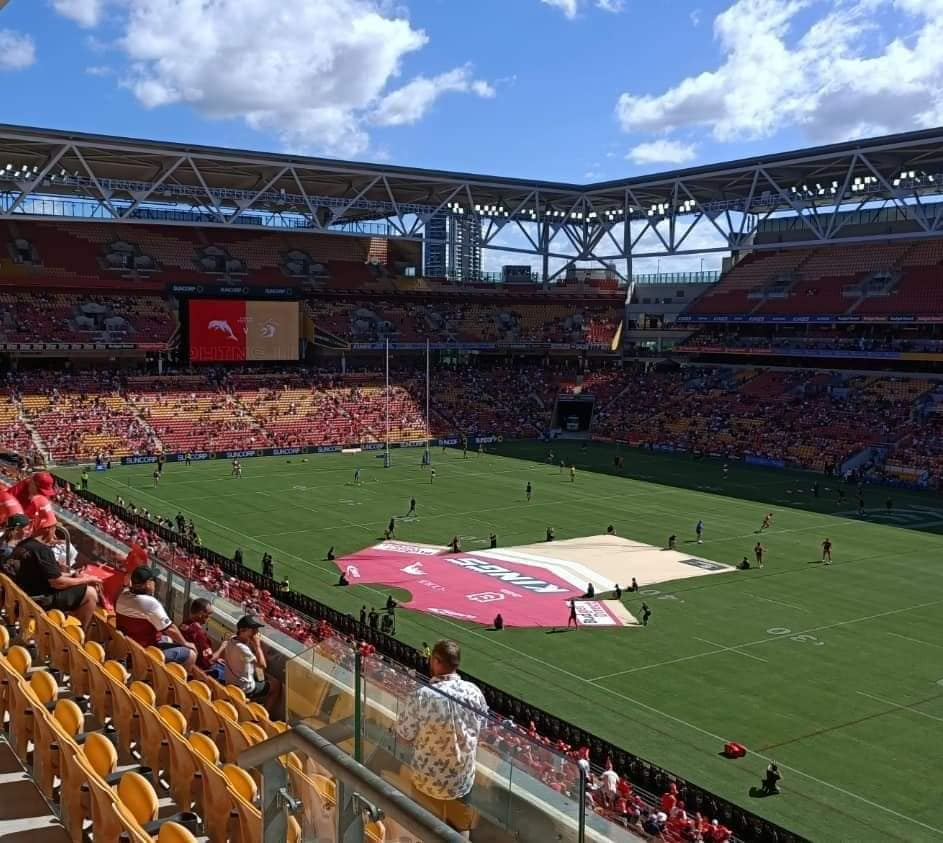
Dolphins NRL jersey on Suncorp Stadium field

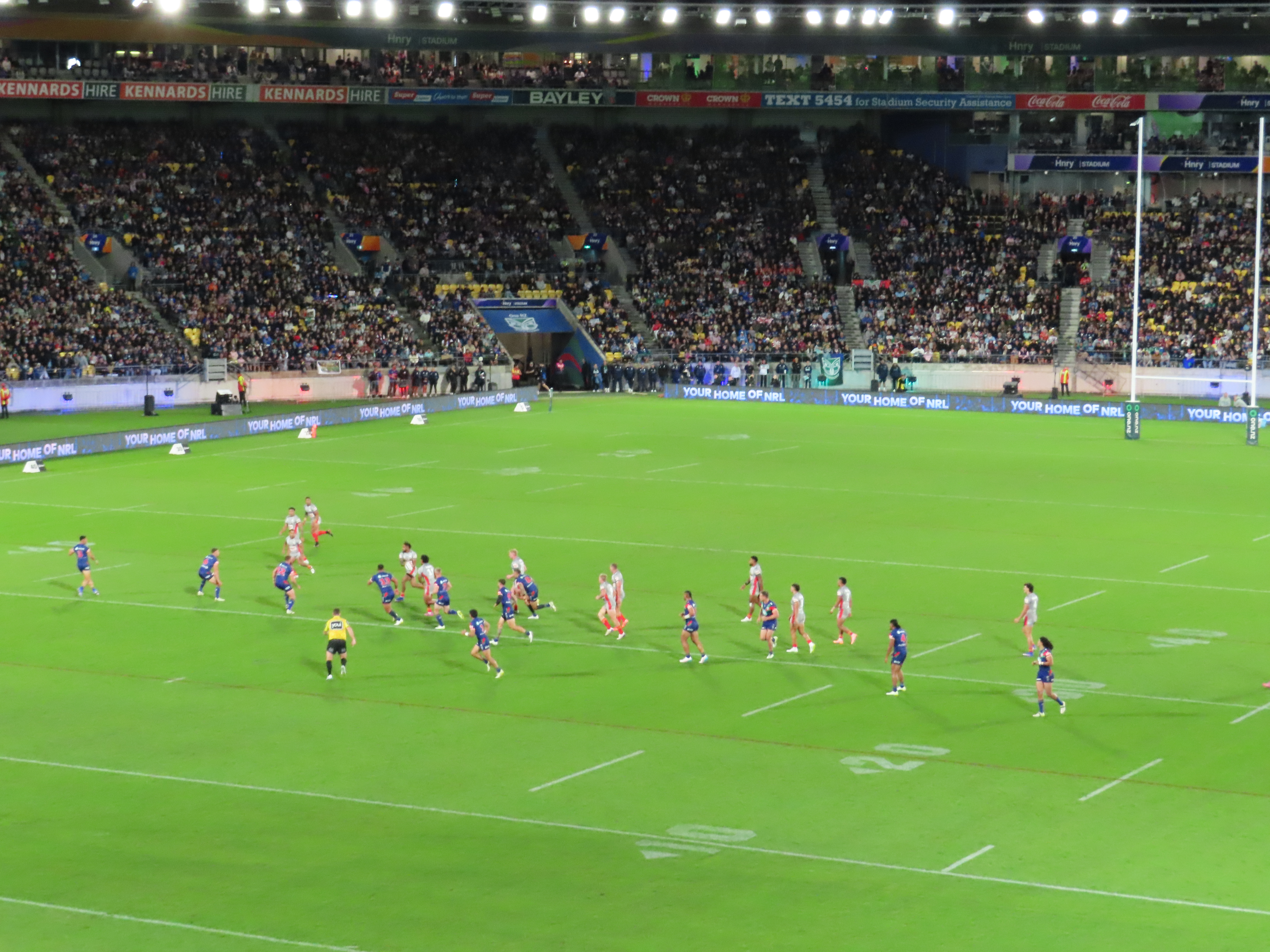
Dolphins playing away to the Warriors on Anzac Day 2026

== Team name ==
The official name of the NRL club is Dolphins. No geographic location is specified. Director of the NRL bid and inaugural club CEO Terry Reader said in 2021 that they "...had to be careful about how we name it because we don't want to alienate anyone and we want to make sure we have the biggest reach." He added that: "We want to make sure we've got broader appeal and whether that's a more contemporary look and feel, it's because we're a national NRL club and the Redcliffe Dolphins will remain and play in the Q-Cup." In 2026, Reader declared that the Dolphins are "proud to be" based in Redcliffe, which is the team's "spiritual home" and said that they are also "Brisbane's team" because the Dolphins have a heritage in the Brisbane Rugby League that predates the creation of the Brisbane Broncos, who were created as a "manufactured expansion side".

== Colours and mascot ==
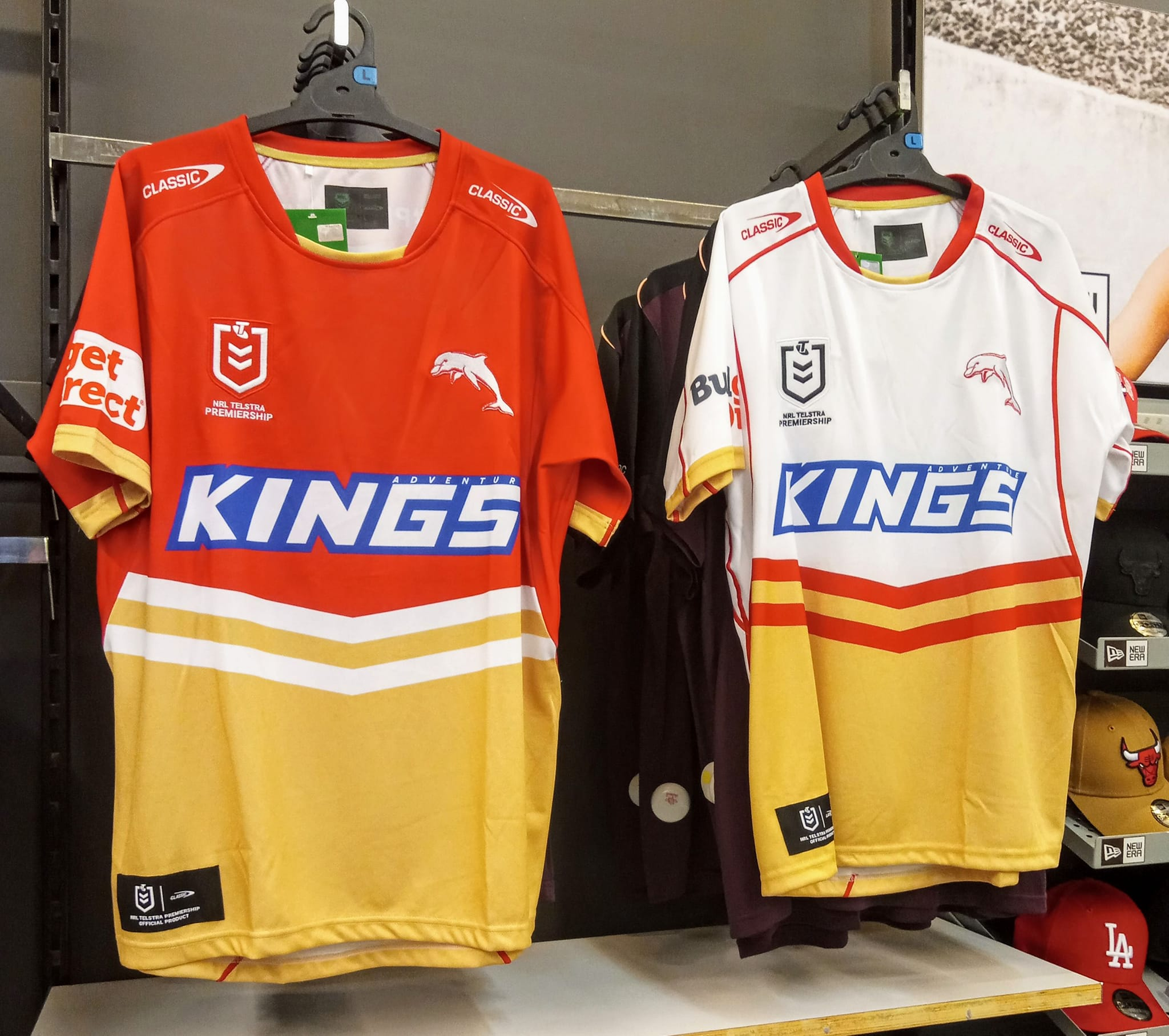
Dolphins NRL 2024 home and away jerseys (front view)

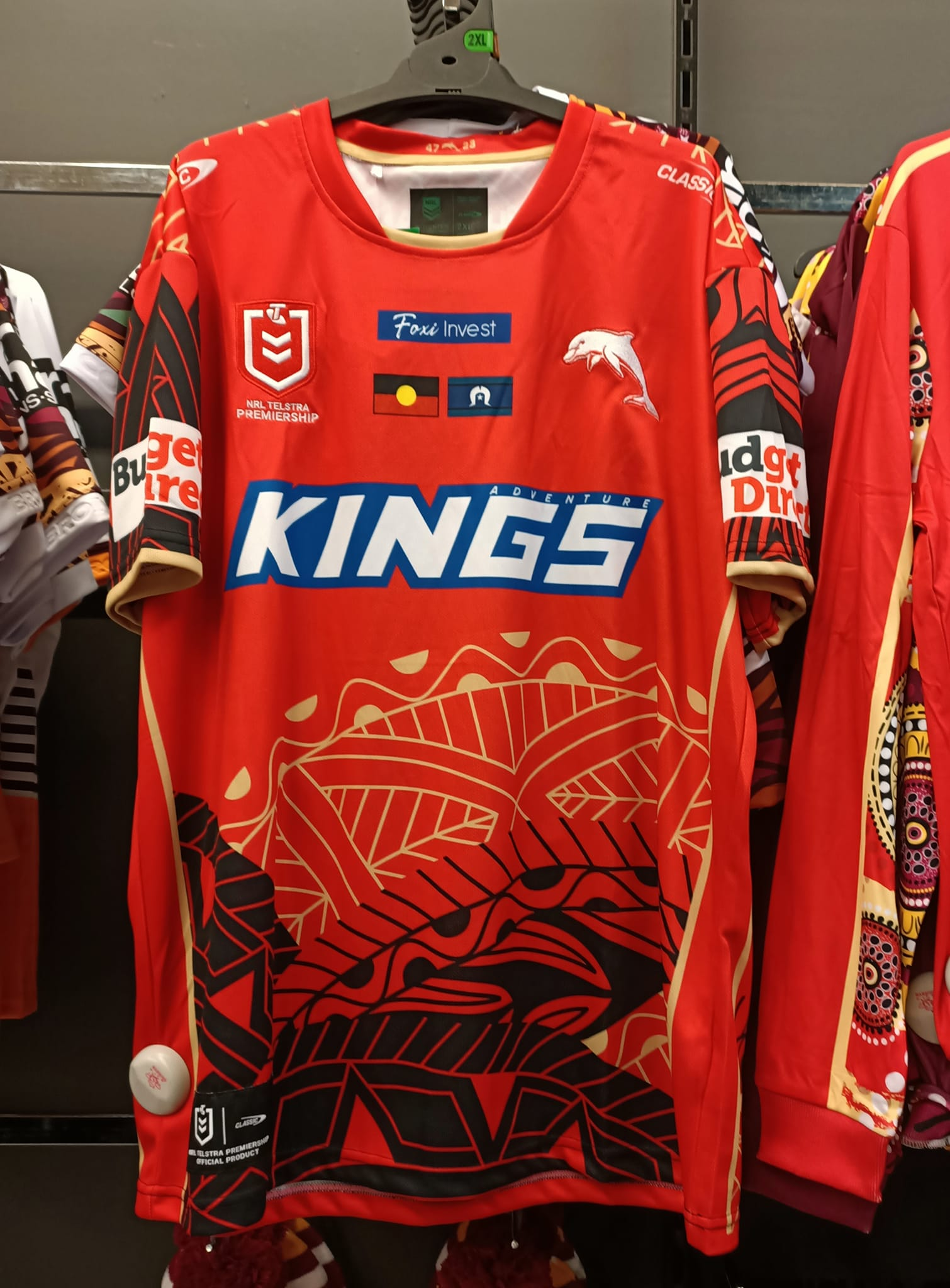
NRL Indigenous Round 12 Dolphins jersey 2023 (front view)

The Dolphins retained the red and white of their Queensland Cup counterparts, with gold added to the colour scheme to avoid a clash with NRL club St. George Illawarra Dragons.

After a fan vote in July 2022, "Phinny" the Dolphin was confirmed as the club's NRL mascot. Sandy, a companion mascot, was later revealed. During a pre-season training camp, senior players composed a team theme song. Separately, the team catchphrase and hashtag is 'Phins Up' (#PhinsUp).

=== Jerseys ===
On 27 October 2021, the Dolphins unveiled a heritage jersey design, inspired by the Redcliffe Dolphins jersey from the 1980s. The design is predominantly red, with white sleeves and a gold trim. On 2 October 2022, the debut home jersey design for 2023 was unveiled just prior to kick-off of the 2022 NRL Grand Final at Accor Stadium in Sydney. The inaugural away jersey was released on 11 November. Otherwise, the team training shirt is predominantly black in colour.

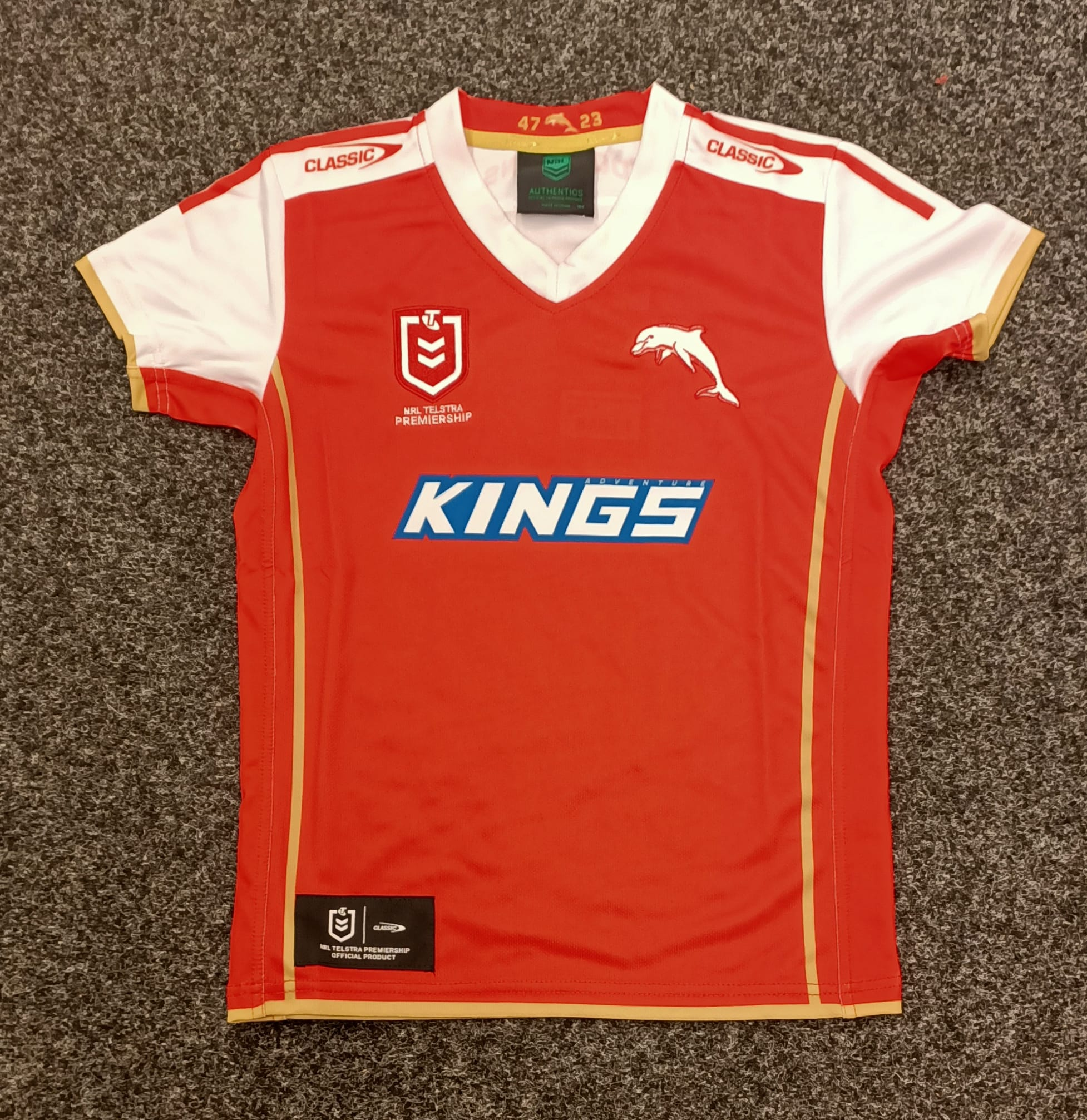
Dolphins NRL 2023 heritage jersey

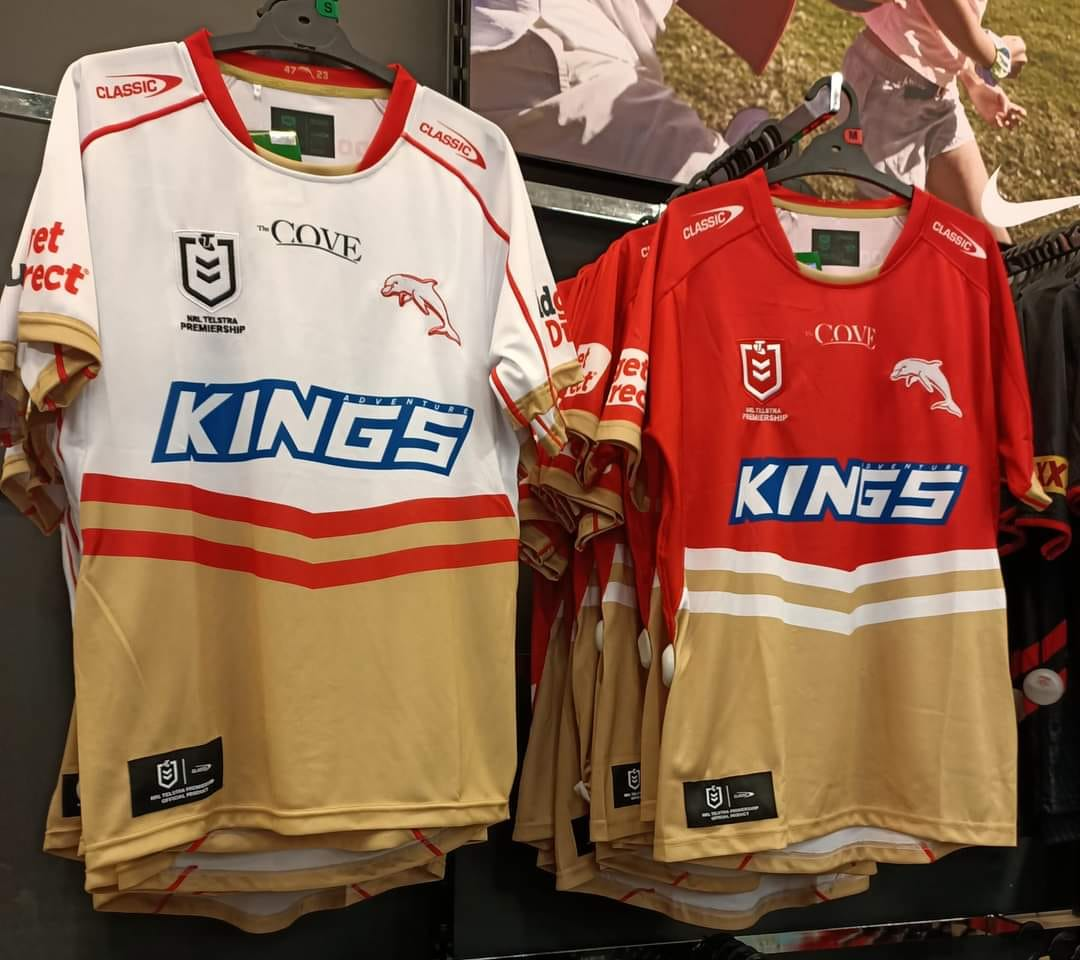
Dolphins NRL away and home jerseys 2023

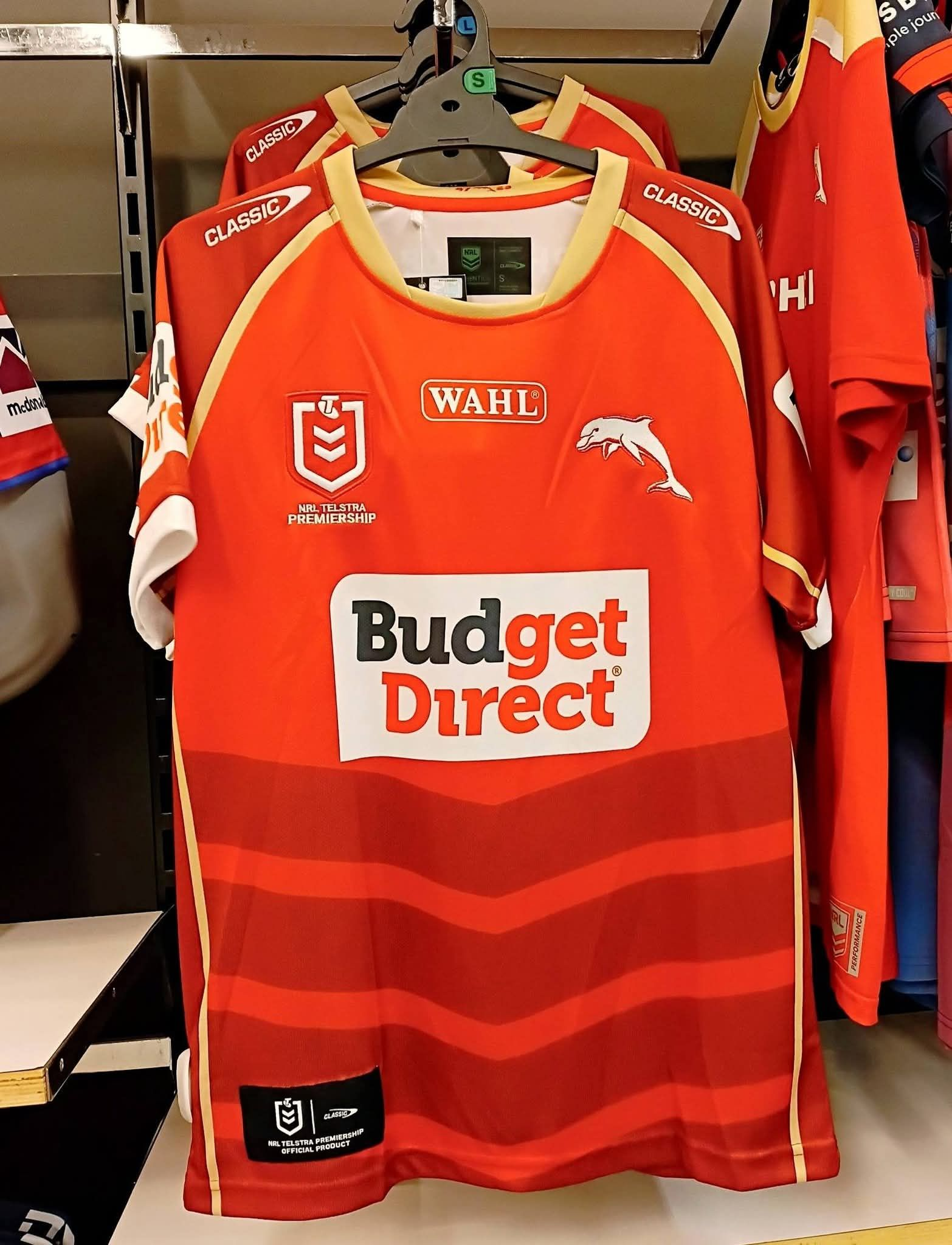
Dolphins NRL 2026 home jersey

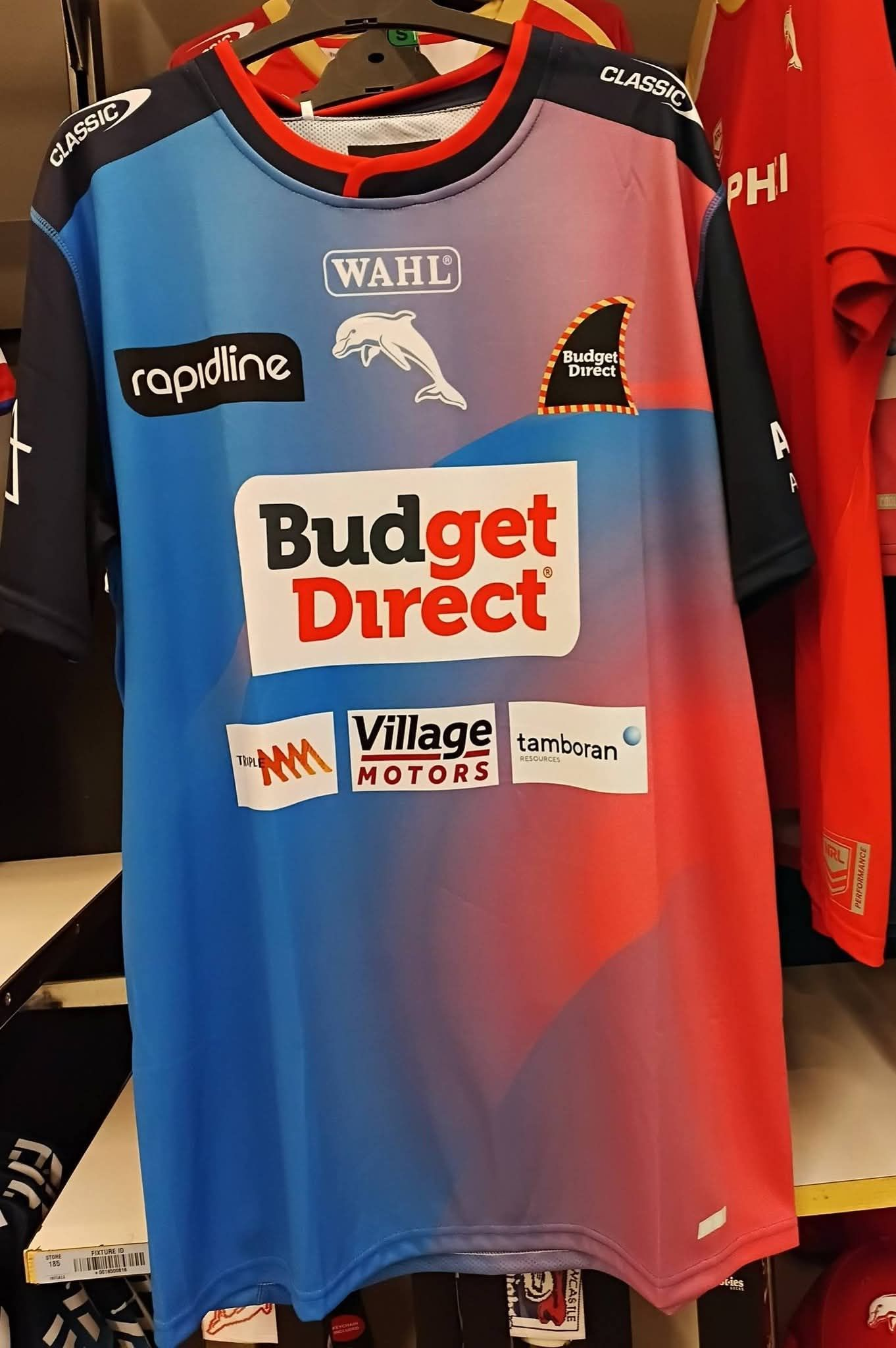
Dolphins 2026 training tee shirt

=== Sponsors and kit manufacturers ===
Year	Kit manufacturer	Shirt sponsors	Back sponsors	Sleeve sponsors	Shorts sponsors	Training ball
2023	Classic Sportswear	Adventure Kings; The Cove	BlueBet; Foxi Invest	Budget Direct	KFC; Ok2Play?	Mitsubishi Electric
2024	Classic Sportswear	Adventure Kings Alternaleaf	BlueBet AngloAmerican	Budget Direct	KFC; Ok2Play?	Mitsubishi Electric
2025	Classic Sportswear	Adventure Kings Wahl Australia	Betr AngloAmerican	Budget Direct	KFC; Ok2Play?	Mitsubishi Electric
2026	Classic Sportswear	Budget Direct Wahl Australia	Betr AngloAmerican	Budget Direct	KFC; Ok2Play?	Mitsubishi Electric

In April 2023, Brisbane law firm Gnech and Associates Lawyers joined on an initial two-year agreement as the official Legal Practice Partner of the Dolphins' NRL club. In August 2023, the Dolphins announced global miner Anglo American as "its newest Premier Partner from 2024, as well as the club’s official Mining Partner, and a Community Partner".

== Team songs ==
=== The Mighty Mighty Dolphins ===
The Dolphins' team song is sung by supporters at home games after a victory.

We are the Dolphins
The red, white and gold
From Brissy to CQ
The young and the old

Sing it loud
And put up your phins
We are the mighty mighty Dolphins

Born ready to win
To make the fans proud
We take on the battle
And light up the crowd

Sing it loud
And put up your phins
We are the mighty mighty Dolphins

We are the mighty mighty Dolphins
We are the mighty mighty Dolphins

Sing it loud
And put up your phins
We are the mighty mighty Dolphins

=== Victory song ===
Dolphins players also celebrate in their dressing rooms after a victory with a team victory song:

Who are, who are, who are we?
We are the Dolphins from Reddy.
Phins up, Phins up, ra ra ra!
We just pumped you, ha ha ha!
47 was day one
Now we're showing everyone
On the road or at the Bay
That we came to fucking play
Every game we'll make a stand
We're the Dolphins from Queensland!
Hoo ha! Hoo ha! Woo!

Unlike "Mighty Mighty Dolphins", which has musical accompaniment and a set tune, players chant the victory song at a rapidly increasing tempo, led by captains banging objects such as boots or wheelie bin lids while the team members spray each other with water.

== Players ==
Dolphins 2026 squad
Top 30 squad – 2026 NRL season			Supplementary list	Coaching staff
Jake Averillo – CE; Jack Bostock – CE; Selwyn Cobbo – WG; Kurt Donoghoe – HK; Herbie Farnworth – CE; Kulikefu Finefeuiaki – SR; Thomas Flegler – PR; Trai Fuller – FB; Tom Gilbert (c) – PR; Jamayne Isaako – WG	Isaiya Katoa (c) – HB; Felise Kaufusi (vc) – PR; Oryn Keeley – SR; Morgan Knowles – LK; Connelly Lemuelu – SR; Jeremy Marshall-King – HK; Francis Molo – PR; Tevita Naufahu – WG; Kodi Nikorima – FE; LJ Nonu – WG	Max Plath – HK; Brian Pouniu – CE; Elijah Rasmussen – PR; Brad Schneider – FE, HK; Ray Stone – LK; Sebastian Su'a – PR; Hamiso Tabuai-Fidow – FB	Charlie Dickson – LK; John Fineanganofo – HK; Zac Garton – SR; Patrick Kailahi – SR; Lewis Symonds – LK; Extended squad: Brent Woolf – HK; Tyreece Tait – WG	Head coach: Kristian Woolf; Assistant coaches: Nathan Fien; Rory Kostjasyn; Ben Woolf; Jeremy Hickmans (Head of Performance); Blake Duncan (Athletic Performance Coach); Elliot Jackson (Athletic Performance Coach); Medical professionals: Adam Schumacher (Physiotherapist); John Davey (Head of Sports Science & Performance Analysis); Legend: (c) Captain(s); (vc) Vice-captain(s); Development players; Extended squad; Updated: 6 November 2026; Source(s):

== Statistics and records ==
For a list of Dolphins team and individual records since they entered the NRL in 2023:

== Record ==
=== Head-to-head ===
Statistics after Finals Week 3 2026

Opponent	Played	Won	Drawn	Lost	Win %
Broncos	8	2	0	6	25
Bulldogs	4	2	0	2	50
Cowboys	8	6	0	2	75
Dragons	6	4	0	2	66
Eels	4	3	0	1	75
Knights	7	1	0	6	14
Panthers	4	1	0	3	25
Rabbitohs	6	3	0	3	50
Raiders	6	3	0	3	50
Roosters	8	3	0	5	38
Sea Eagles	5	2	0	3	40
Sharks	6	4	0	2	66
Storm	5	2	0	3	40
Tigers	5	3	0	2	66
Titans	8	7	0	1	87
Warriors	9	5	0	4	55

Biggest winning margins

Margin	Score	Opponent	Venue	Date
54	58–4	North Queensland Cowboys	Queensland Country Bank Stadium	14 June 2025
50	56–6	St George Illawarra Dragons	Suncorp Stadium	6 June 2025

Most consecutive wins

- 8 – (19 July 2026 – 12 September 2026: Finals Week 1)
- 8 – (1 May 2026 – 27 June 2026)

Biggest comeback

- After trailing the Gold Coast Titans 0-26 after 28 minutes in their round 8 fixture during the 2023 NRL Season, the Dolphins won the match 28-26, equalling the biggest comeback win in NRL history.

Biggest losing margins

Margin	Score	Opponent	Venue	Date
66	0—66	Cronulla-Sutherland Sharks	Kayo Stadium	11 July 2026
52	12–64	Sydney Roosters	Suncorp Stadium	9 August 2025
42	6–48	Melbourne Storm	AAMI Park	24 August 2024

=== Summary ===
Competition	Regular season					Finals progression	Season
Competition	Pld	W	D	L	Pos.	Finals progression	Season
2023 National Rugby League	24	9	0	15	13/17	—N/a	overview
2024 National Rugby League	24	11	0	13	10/17	—N/a	overview
2025 National Rugby League	24	12	0	12	9/17	—N/a	overview
2026 National Rugby League	24	17	0	7	3/17	Preliminary Final	overview
2027 National Rugby League							overview

== Home grounds ==
The Dolphins play most of their twelve home games at the 52,500-capacity Suncorp Stadium in Brisbane, with a few matches at Kayo Stadium, which also serves as a training and administration base. The redevelopment of Browne Park in Rockhampton may also see occasional Dolphins' games at that venue.

In May 2025, it was announced that the Dolphins would play one home game a year at TIO Stadium in Darwin for the next three years.

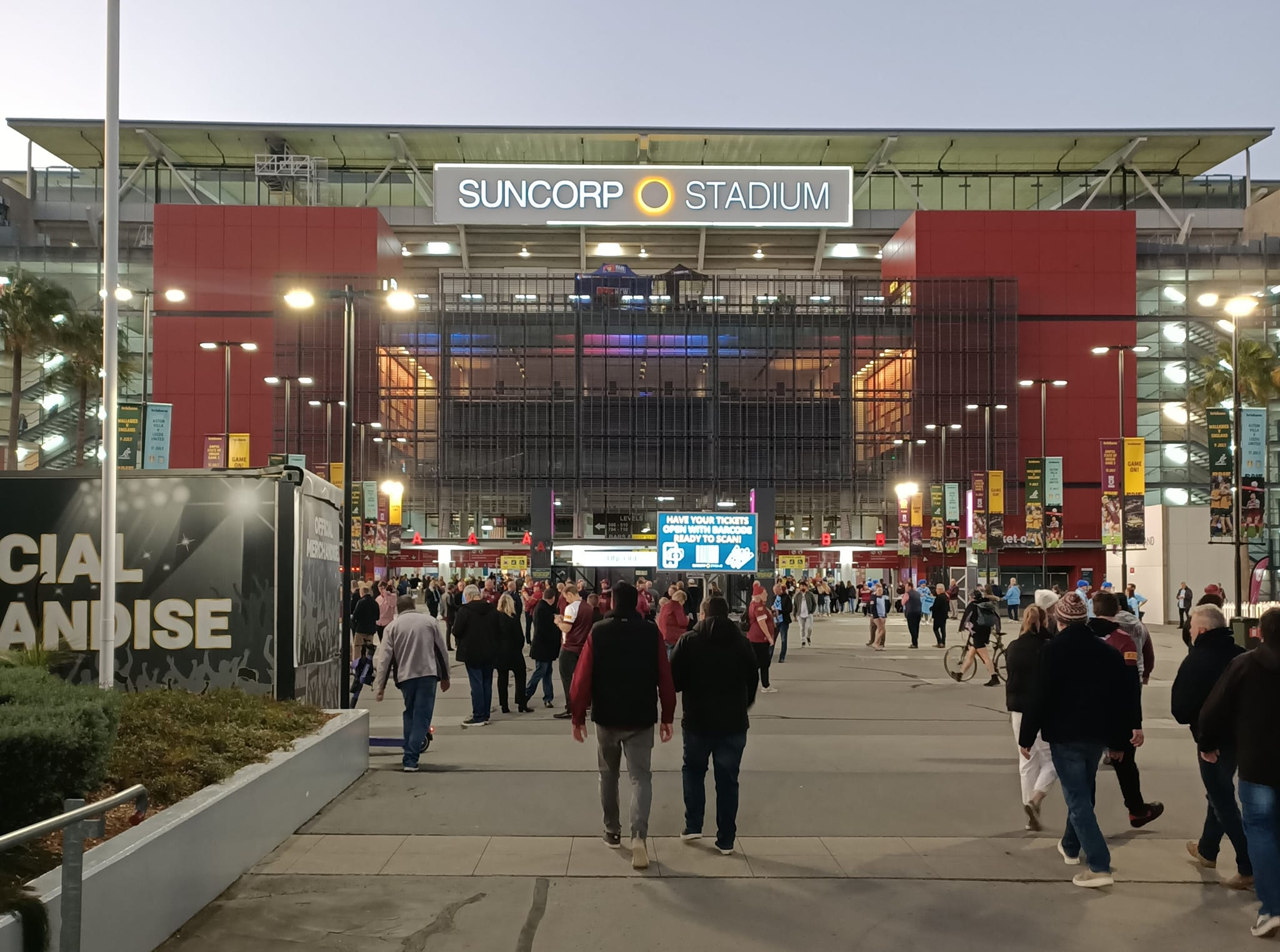
Suncorp Stadium entry

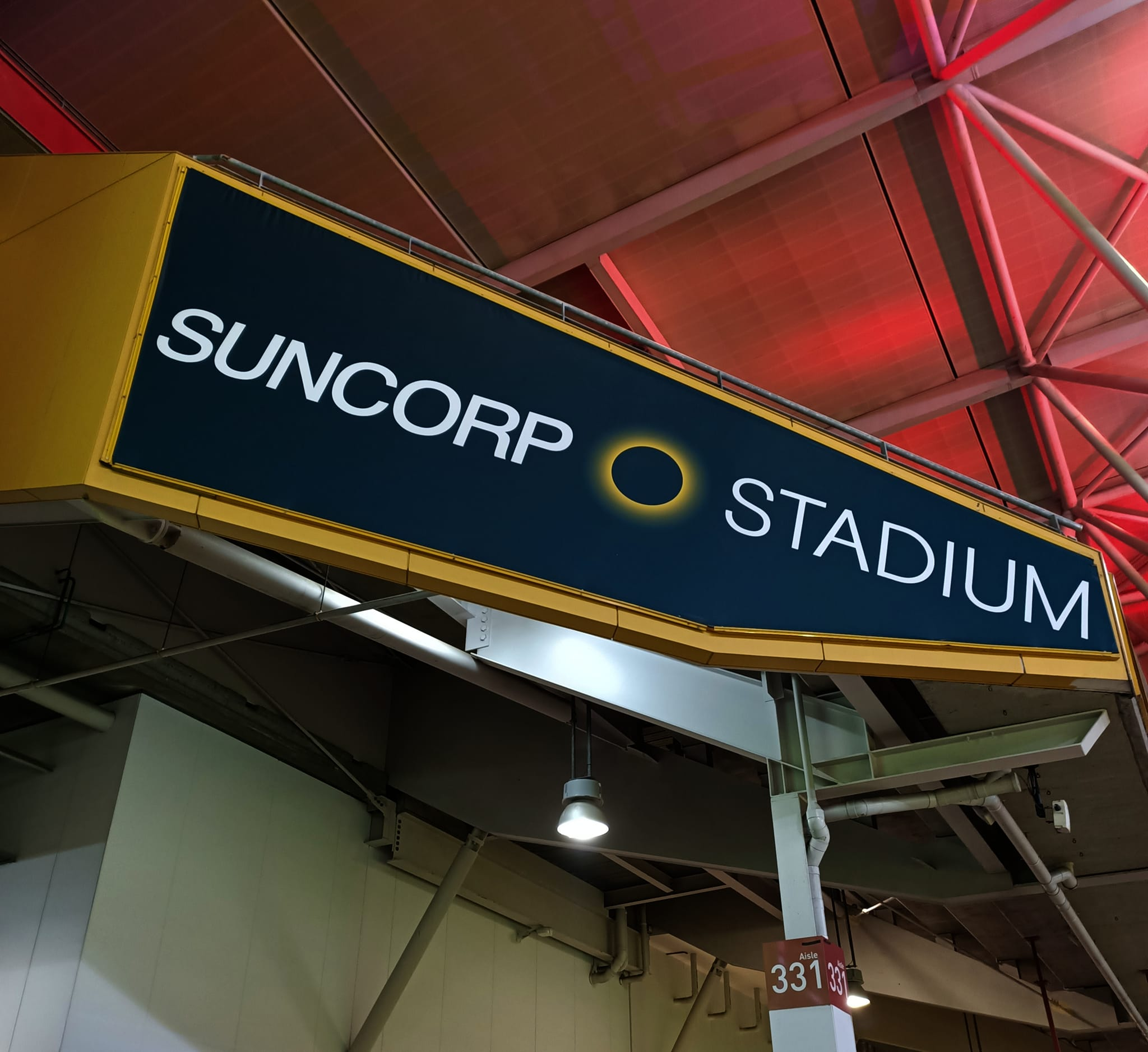
Suncorp Stadium sign

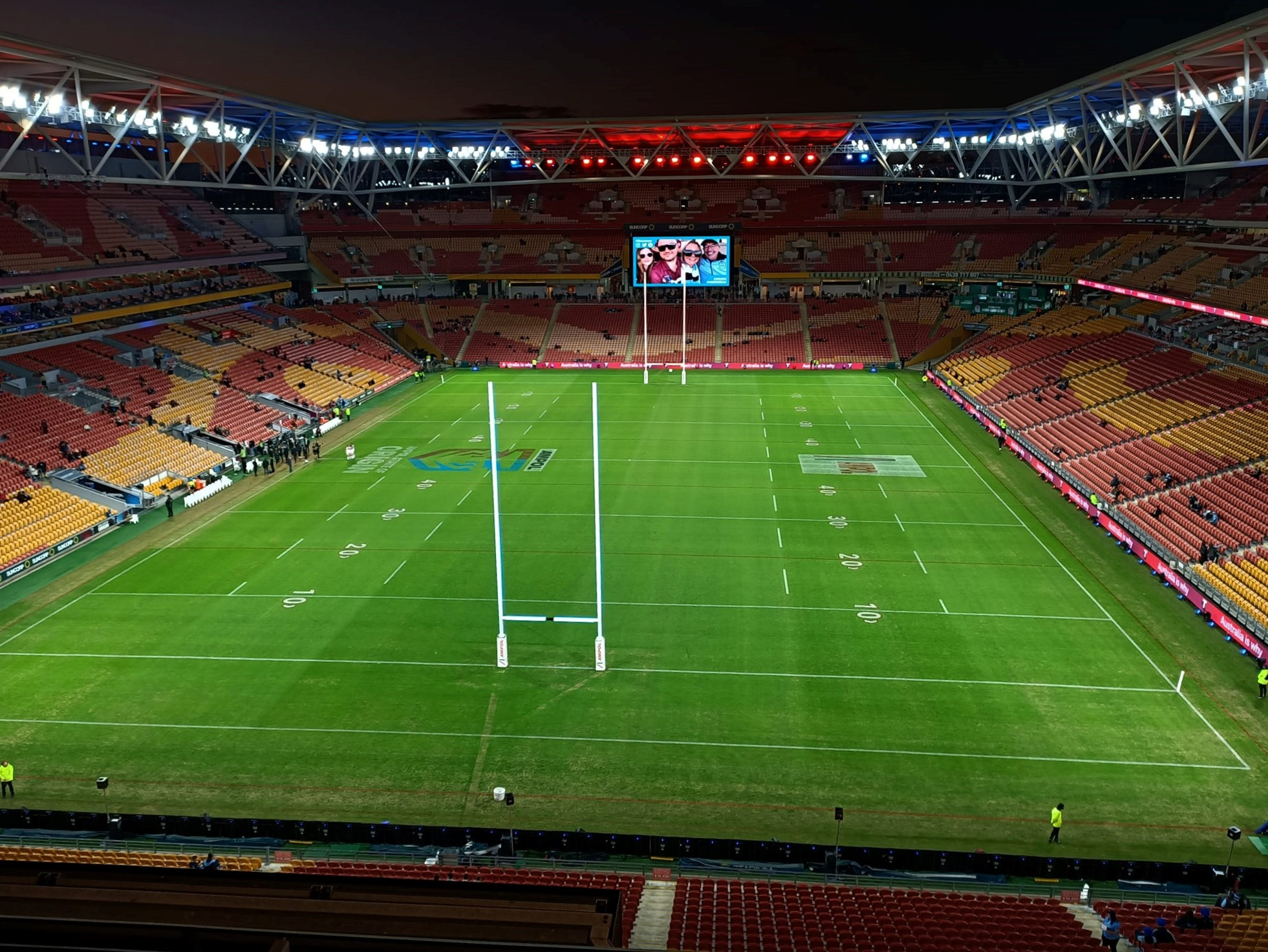
Suncorp Stadium interior

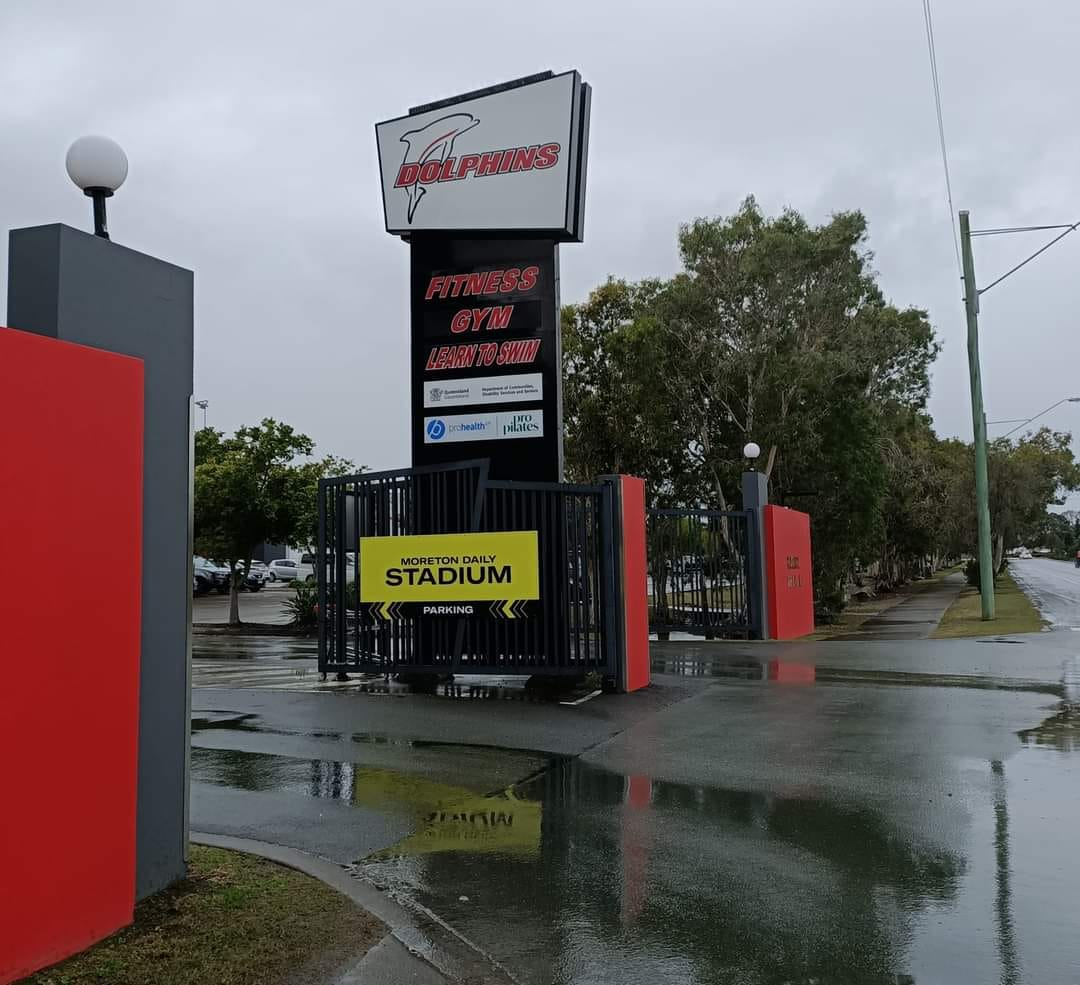
Moreton Daily signage (now Kayo Stadium)

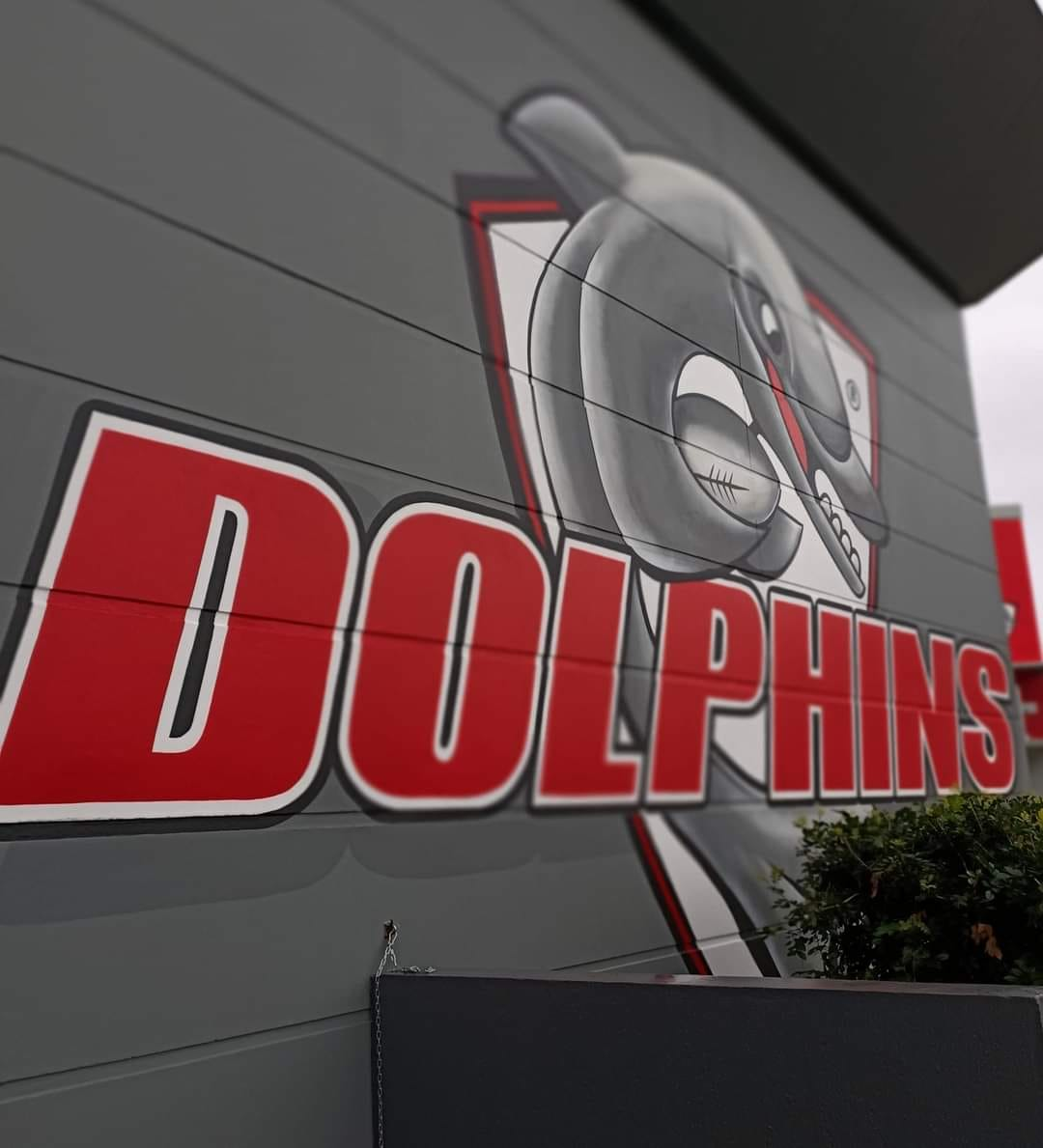
Moreton Daily Stadium wall (now Kayo Stadium)

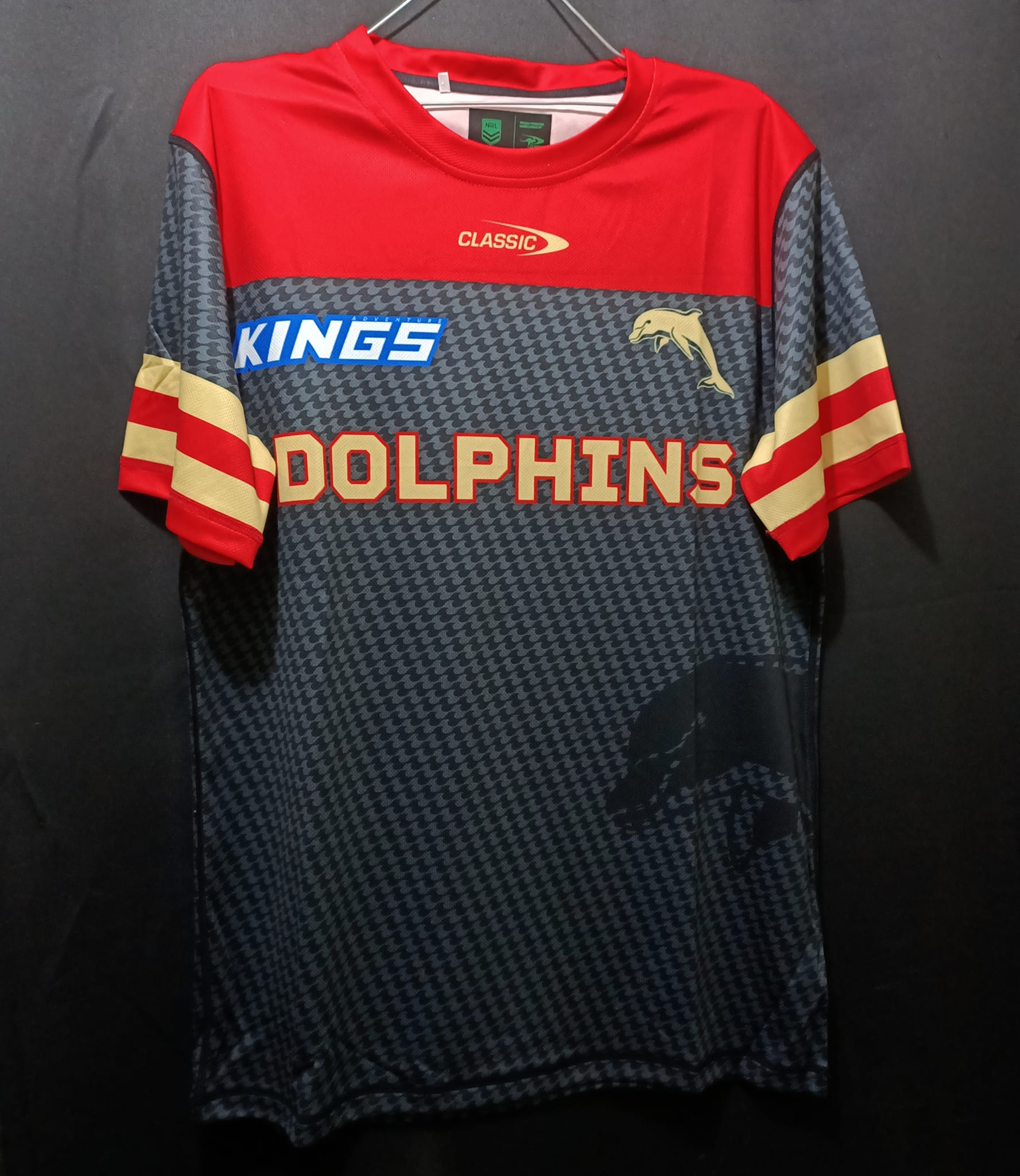
Dolphins NRL 2023 warm-up tee-shirt

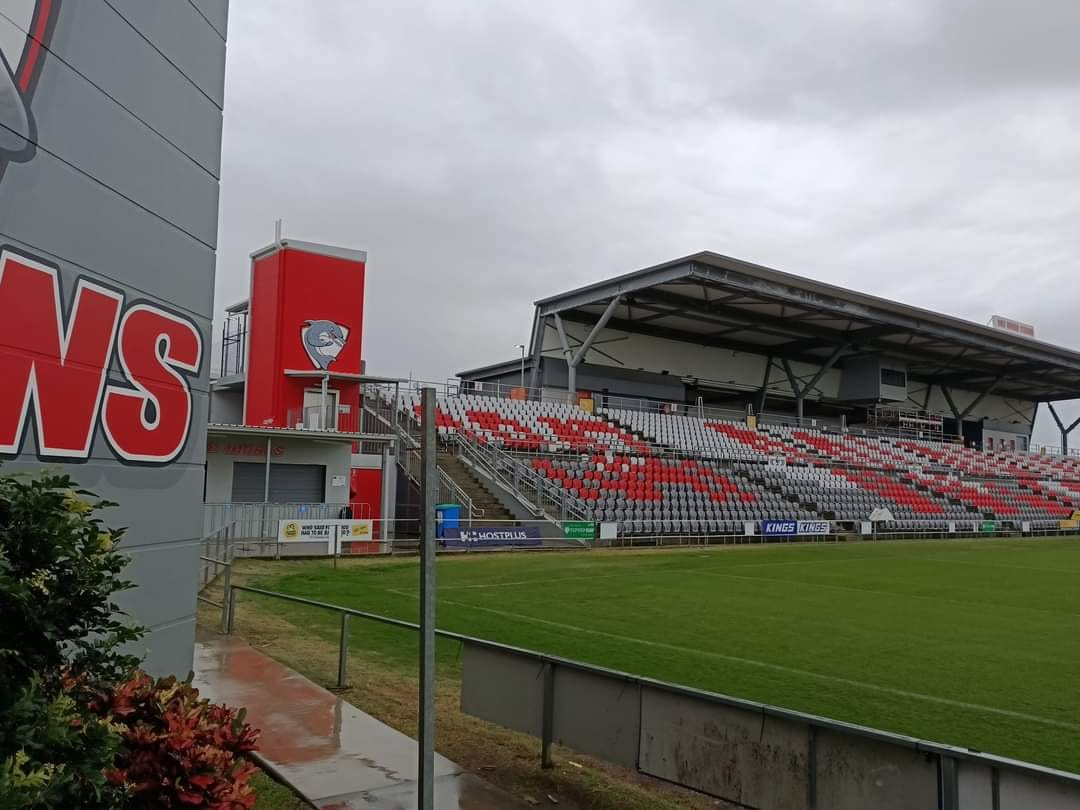
Moreton Daily Stadium (now Kayo Stadium)

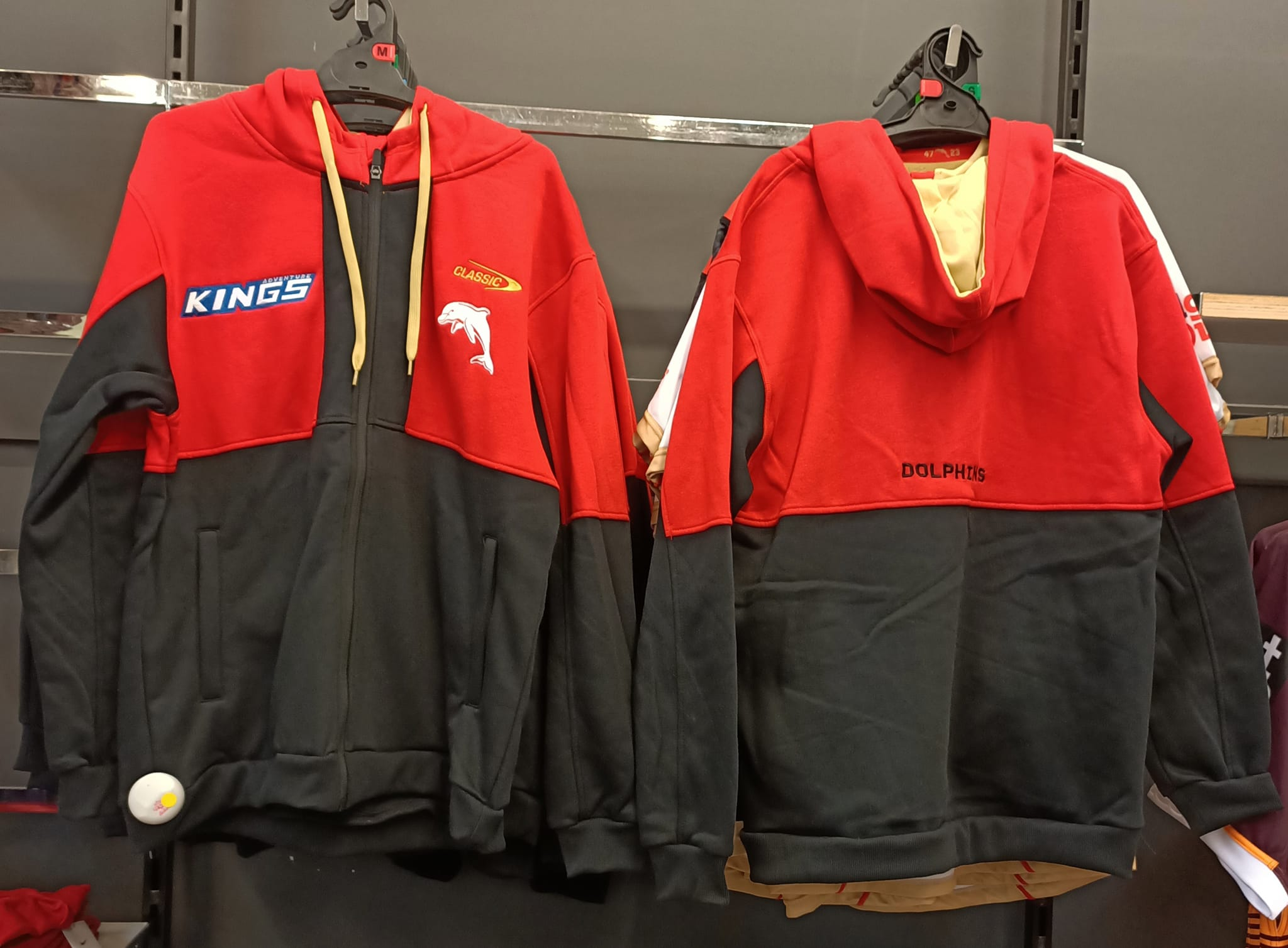
Dolphins NRL men's zipped hoodie

== Affiliations and junior clubs ==
Queensland Cup affiliates
Central Queensland Capras
Norths Devils
PNG Hunters
Redcliffe Dolphins

BRL affiliates
Brighton Roosters
Pine Rivers Bears
Regional affiliates
Wide Bay & Bundaberg Region

Mal Meninga Cup (U18), Cyril Connell Cup (U16) and Harvey Norman (U19 girls) affiliates
Central Queensland Capras
Norths Devils
Redcliffe Dolphins
Wide Bay Bulls

Local junior clubs
A list of Junior Rugby League clubs within the Dolphins area. In brackets, JRL teams fielded in 2022.

Albany Creek Crushers (20)
Brighton Roosters (23)
Burpengary Jets (33)
Dayboro Cowboys (13)
Moreton Bay Raiders (14)
Narangba Rangers (23)
North Lakes Kangaroos (21)
Pine Central Holy Spirit Hornets (37)
Pine Rivers Bears (19)
Redcliffe Dolphins (45)
Samford Stags (15)
Valleys Diehards (21)

Beachmere Pelicans (3 – U13 & above)
Bribie Island Warrigals (8 – U13 & above)
Caboolture Snakes (13 – U13 & above)

== See also ==
- Rugby league in Queensland
