= Budget Direct =

Australian insurance brand

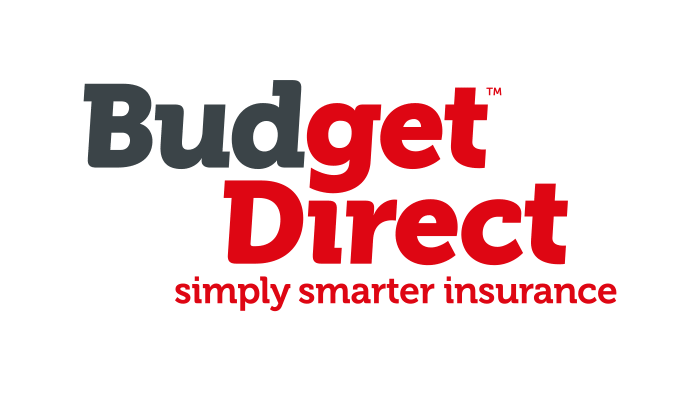
- Type: Private
- Industry: Insurance
- Founded: 1999
- Headquarters: Brisbane, Australia
- Area served: Australia
- Key people: Adam Crane (CEO)
- Products: Vehicle insurance, home and contents insurance, travel insurance, motorcycle insurance, pet insurance, roadside assistance
- Number of employees: 1,700
- Website: budgetdirect.com.au

Budget Direct is an insurance brand of Auto & General headquartered in Brisbane, Australia. Their car and home insurance policies are underwritten by Auto & General Insurance Company Limited. Auto & General Insurance Company is an Australian insurance company regulated by APRA and is an active member of the Insurance Council of Australia.

Budget Direct is part of the Budget Insurance group, established in the early 1970s, which collects A$2 billion in premiums each year for the group's 6.8 million policies.

== Operations ==
Budget Direct operates three call centres located in Queensland at Kawana Waters, North Lakes as well as at the company's headquarters located in Toowong, Brisbane. The company also has multiple assessment centres in Brisbane, Sydney and Melbourne. As of April 2020, the company has over 1 million policy holders and over 1,700 staff. In 2016 Budget Direct launched in Singapore offering car, motorcycle and travel insurance.

== Advertising ==
Budget Direct's previous television advertisements depicted a couple called Michael and Michelle. The ads revolved around Michelle's mispronunciation of the word "Budget" whilst explaining the benefits of Budget Direct insurance to Michael who continually corrects her pronunciation. In August 2013 Budget Direct rebranded with an alien version of the shower ad with animated aliens instead of Michelle and Michael. This also included a revelation of a new brand positioning and logo created by Hulsbosch. In January 2014 it was reported that the brand had engaged 303Lowe with the release of new TV ads featuring a daredevil by the name of Captain Risky and tagline "We don't insure Captain Risky to keep prices low", to explain the brand's low to medium risk market positioning. In 2018 a new series of television advertisements were launched with a detective character called 'Sarge' (played by Hamish Clark). The advertisements feature Sarge and a sidekick tackling fantastical and science fiction-based mysteries with the tagline Insurance Solved.

== Awards ==
Budget Direct has won the CANSTAR award for Outstanding Value Car Insurance every year from 2007 to 2022. Budget Direct won the Money Magazine Insurer of the Year award for their car and home insurance products every year from 2017 to 2022. They have also won the Money Magazine Best-Value Car Insurance award from 2019 to 2022.

== Criticism ==
In February 2026, the Australian Securities and Investments Commission (ASIC) took legal action against Auto & General after more than 39,000 Budget Direct customers lost discounts between March 2020 and July 2024 after making changes to their insurance policy such as updating their address or the frequency of their payments. ASIC alleged the company became aware of the issue as early as 2016 but failed to fix it or inform customers for years. Although Auto & General later repaid the customers and made improvements to its system, ASIC will seek declarations and civil penalties.
