= Artie Legacy Medal =

Rugby League medal in Australia

- Sport: Rugby league
- Inaugural season: 2023
- Number of teams: 2
- Most Recent Recipient: James Tedesco (2025)
- Most titles: James Tedesco (2 titles)

The National Rugby League's Artie Legacy Medal is an award that was inaugurated in the 2023 NRL season to be presented to the best player on the field in each match played between the Dolphins and Sydney Roosters. It was created to honour rugby league Immortal Arthur “Artie” Beetson, who was himself a former player and coach of both the Redcliffe Dolphins and the Eastern Suburbs Roosters.

It is intended that the Medal be "... played for and at every game between the two organisations that enabled him [Beetson] to achieve his Immortal status."

== Fixtures & Results ==
Winning Team	Score	Losing Team	Medal Recipient	Match information
Winning Team	Score	Losing Team	Medal Recipient	Date and time	Venue	Referee	Crowd
Dolphins	28–18	Sydney Roosters	Felise Kaufusi	Sunday 5 March 2023 (Round 1)	Suncorp Stadium	Chris Butler	32,177
Sydney Roosters	30-14	Dolphins	Billy Smith	Saturday 12 August 2023 (Round 24)	Allianz Stadium	Todd Smith	13,704
Sydney Roosters	40-34	Dolphins	Sam Walker	Friday 2 August 2024 (Round 22)	HBF Park, Perth	Gerard Sutton	20,027
Sydney Roosters	36-26	Dolphins	James Tedesco	Friday 2 May 2025 (Round 9)	Suncorp Stadium, Brisbane	Grant Atkins	48,359
Sydney Roosters	64-12	Dolphins	James Tedesco	Saturday 9 August 2025 (Round 23)	Suncorp Stadium, Brisbane	Gerard Sutton	24,117

== See also ==
- Rivalries in the National Rugby League
