= Hans Hulsbosch =

Australian businessman

Hans Hulsbosch is an Australian brand designer, responsible for the development of many of Australia's leading brand identities including Qantas, the Woolworths conglomerate, and Virgin Australia. In 1982, he pioneered the concept of combining brand, brand strategy and product development.

== History ==
Hans Hulsbosch was born in Valkenswaard, The Netherlands. He studied at the School of Graphic Design, Eindhoven and was offered his first job as a packaging designer at Willem II. In the early 1970's he moved to Amsterdam, where he worked for the design group Ten Cate Bergmans and advertising agency Leo Burnett. In 1975 he and his wife Marianne moved to Wellington, New Zealand, where he worked for several advertising agencies. In 1979 he moved to Sydney, Australia, and became Creative Director for advertising agency Clemenger BBDO. In the late 1970's and early 1980's Hans pioneered the concept of branding in Australia, being the first to combine brand strategy, brand identity and brand management. In 1982 he started his own brand agency and has created numerous award-winning, iconic brand identities and advertising campaigns.

== Work ==
When Hans started his own agency he contracted himself to several advertising agencies and created the Tia Maria 'Gold and Brown' television commercial, which became Australia's first global campaign and won the 'Facts tv commercial of the year award' in 1984. Other 'campaigns of the year awards' included Campari's "Who's that drinking Campari?" and the Hoover 10second television advertisements. His first own major client was Qantas followed by Sitmar Cruises (P&O). He has created many of Australia's iconic brands such as the Qantas 'flying kangaroo', Woolworths, ABC Kids, Taronga Zoo, The MLC 'Nest Egg', Perpetual, The Australian Ballet, Free TV Australia, Football Federation of Australia, P&O, Nylex and Foxtel. He and his company have also designed many of Australia's leading packaging brands such as 'Thins' for Arnotts, 'Windex' and 'Toilet Duck' for SC Johnson, 'Dettol', 'UV Triple Guard', 'Exit Mould' and 'Disprin' for Reckitt Benkiser, 'Kleenex Tissues' and 'Huggies' for Kimberly-Clark, 'Wild Oats' for Oatley Family Wines and Coles Own Brand.

Hulsbosch has also created identities for pro bono clients such as Taronga and Dubbo Zoo, The University of Sydney, The Children's Medical Research institute, The Kidney Foundation, Meals on Wheels, The Bobby Goldsmith Foundation and The McGrath Foundation.

Hulsbosch has an extensive internship program to give young and upcoming designers the opportunity to experience brand agency culture and client projects.

Current clients include Tennis Australia, Virgin Australia, Apple, ABC, Rebel Sport, Supercars, Coles, Taronga Zoo, Technology One, IAG, Football Federation of Australia, Dexus, Allens Linklaters, Santos, Bluescope, 7 West Media, SBS and National Intermodal.

== Awards ==
Hulsbosch has won many national and international design and advertising awards. Between 1982 and 1984 he won several major international advertising awards for Tia Maria, Campari, Pizza Hut and Hoover. In 1998 he won the gold Mobius award for Thins Potato Chips packaging. In 2008, the identity for Qantas was chosen as one of the 10 best identities in the world at the Cannes Lions International Festival of Creativity and received a Mobius Award in the UK for his Woolworths Australia work. In 2009, Brandchannel ranked the Woolworths logo 'the best in Australia'. In 2012, the Australian Marketing magazine chose Woolworths and Qantas in the top 5 best Australian logos of all time. Hans Hulsbosch has been voted best small business entrepreneur in NSW and his agency has been awarded the Telstra Best Small Business Award, Hulsbosch has won the Adnews Specialist Agency of the Year Award 3 times since 2009.
