= Kristian Woolf =

Australian professional rugby league coach

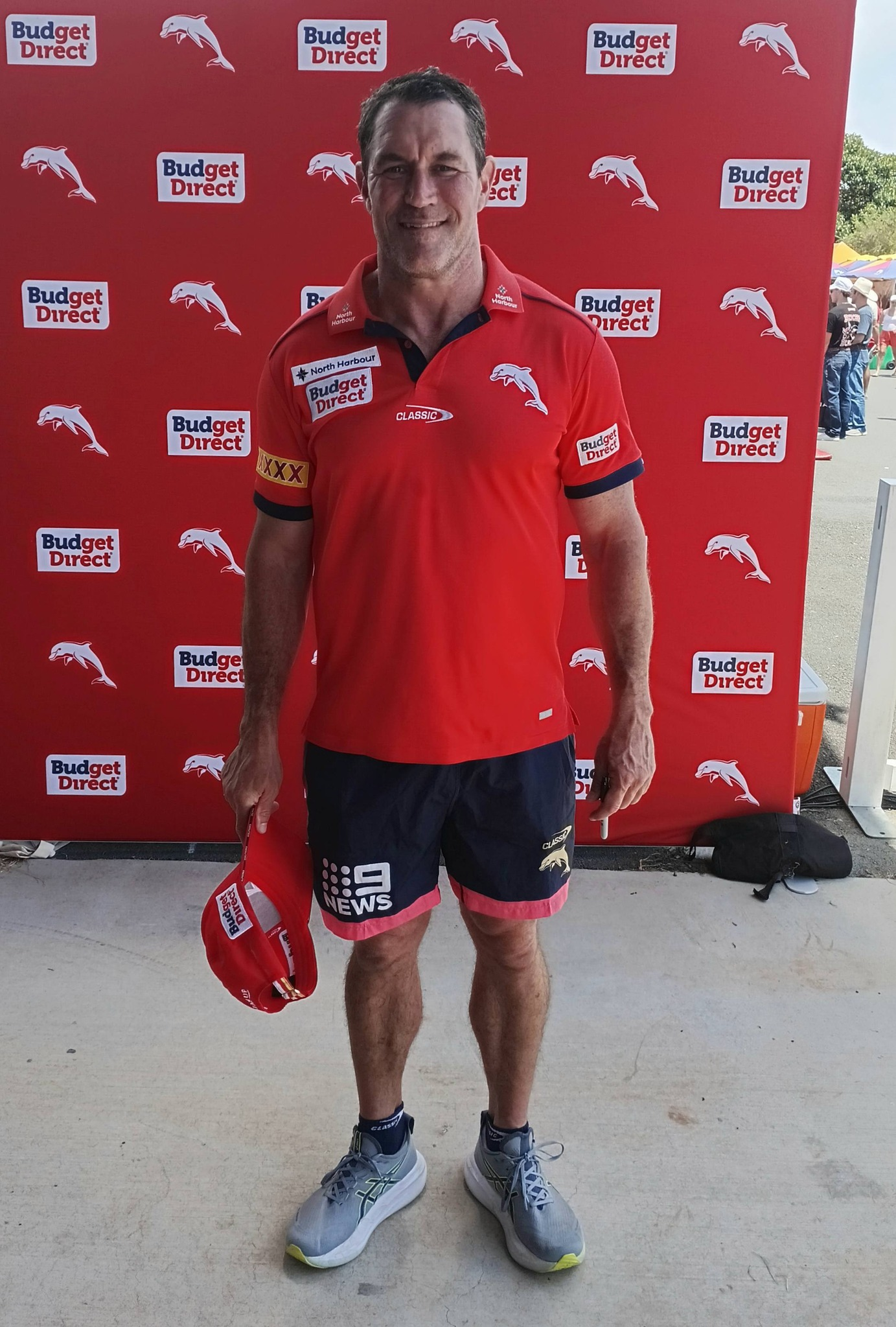

Personal information
- Born: 6 July 1975 (age 51) Mount Isa, Queensland, Australia

Coaching information
Club
Years	Team	Gms	W	D	L	W%
2019	Newcastle Knights	2	1	0	1	50
2020–22	St Helens	80	61	0	19	76
2025–	Dolphins	51	32	0	19	63
	Total	133	94	0	39	71
Representative
Years	Team	Gms	W	D	L	W%
2014–	Tonga	32	18	0	14	56
- Source: As of 16 November 2026

Kristian Woolf (born 6 July 1975) is an Australian professional rugby league football coach who is the head coach of the Dolphins in the National Rugby League (NRL) and the Tonga national team.

While Woolf was the head coach of St Helens in the British Super League, they won the 2020, 2021 and 2022 grand finals. Separately, Woolf has also been an interim head coach of the Newcastle Knights in the NRL.

== Playing career ==
Woolf was born and raised in Mount Isa, Queensland. He played for the Souths Magpies in Brisbane between 1996 and 1997.

== Coaching career ==
In 2002, Woolf began his coaching career as an assistant coach for the Townsville Brothers in the Townsville & District Rugby League (TDRL) competition. At the same time, Woolf was teaching at Ignatius Park College and coaching their senior rugby league side, winning the Queensland State Schoolboys Championship in 2004.

In 2005, Woolf joined the North Queensland Cowboys as their junior development manager. After holding the role for four seasons, Woolf became the team's NYC coach in 2009. He took the side to the finals for the first time in 2010 and to their first Grand Final in 2011, which they lost in golden point to the New Zealand Warriors.

In 2012, Woolf joined the Brisbane Broncos as an assistant coach to Anthony Griffin.

In 2015, he returned to North Queensland as the inaugural coach of the new Intrust Super Cup side, the Townsville Blackhawks. In the club's first season, the side finished in first place and qualified for the Grand Final, losing to the Ipswich Jets.

Woolf was appointed head coach of the Tongan national team in 2014. In October 2015, Woolf recorded his first win with Tonga in the Asia-Pacific 2017 World Cup qualifying game against the Cook Islands. In 2016, Woolf's Tonga team suffered a second straight defeat by Samoa in the 2016 Polynesian Cup.

In the 2017 Rugby League World Cup, Woolf guided Tonga to beat NZ Kiwi and a thriller with England at Semi Final.

On 26 September 2018, Woolf officially left his role as Blackhawks' head coach, which he held for four seasons, to take up an assistant coaching position with the Newcastle Knights.

On 27 August 2019, Woolf was named interim head coach with Newcastle for the remainder of the 2019 season after Nathan Brown stepped down.

On 10 September 2019, it was announced that Woolf would take up the head coach role at St Helens in 2020, signing a two-year contract with the club having the option to extend a further year.

After defeating NZ Kiwi in 2017, Woolf led Tonga in 2019 to defeat both the British Lions Rugby League and the World Champion Australian Kangaroos.

He coached St Helens in the club's 8–4 2020 Super League Grand Final victory over Wigan at the Kingston Communications Stadium in Hull. He coached St Helens to victory in the 2021 Challenge Cup Final with a 26–12 victory over Castleford at Wembley Stadium. On 9 October 2021, Woolf coached St Helens to their 2021 Super League Grand Final victory over the Catalans Dragons. On 24 September 2022, Woolf coached St Helens in their 2022 Super League Grand Final victory over Leeds in his final game in charge of the club.

=== Tonga record ===
Opponent	Played	Won	Drew	Lost	Win Ratio (%)
Cook Islands	1	1	0	0	100.00
England	2	1	0	1	50.00
Fiji	1	1	0	0	100.00
Lebanon	1	1	0	0	100.00
New Zealand	3	2	0	1	66.67
Papua New Guinea	1	0	0	1	00.00
Samoa	3	1	0	2	33.33
Scotland	1	1	0	0	100.00
TOTAL	29	16	0	13	60.00

World Cup record
Year	Round	Position	GP	W	L	D
Australia/New Zealand/Papua New Guinea 2017	Third place	3/14	5	4	1	0
Total	0 Titles	0/1	5	4	1	0

=== Dolphins ===
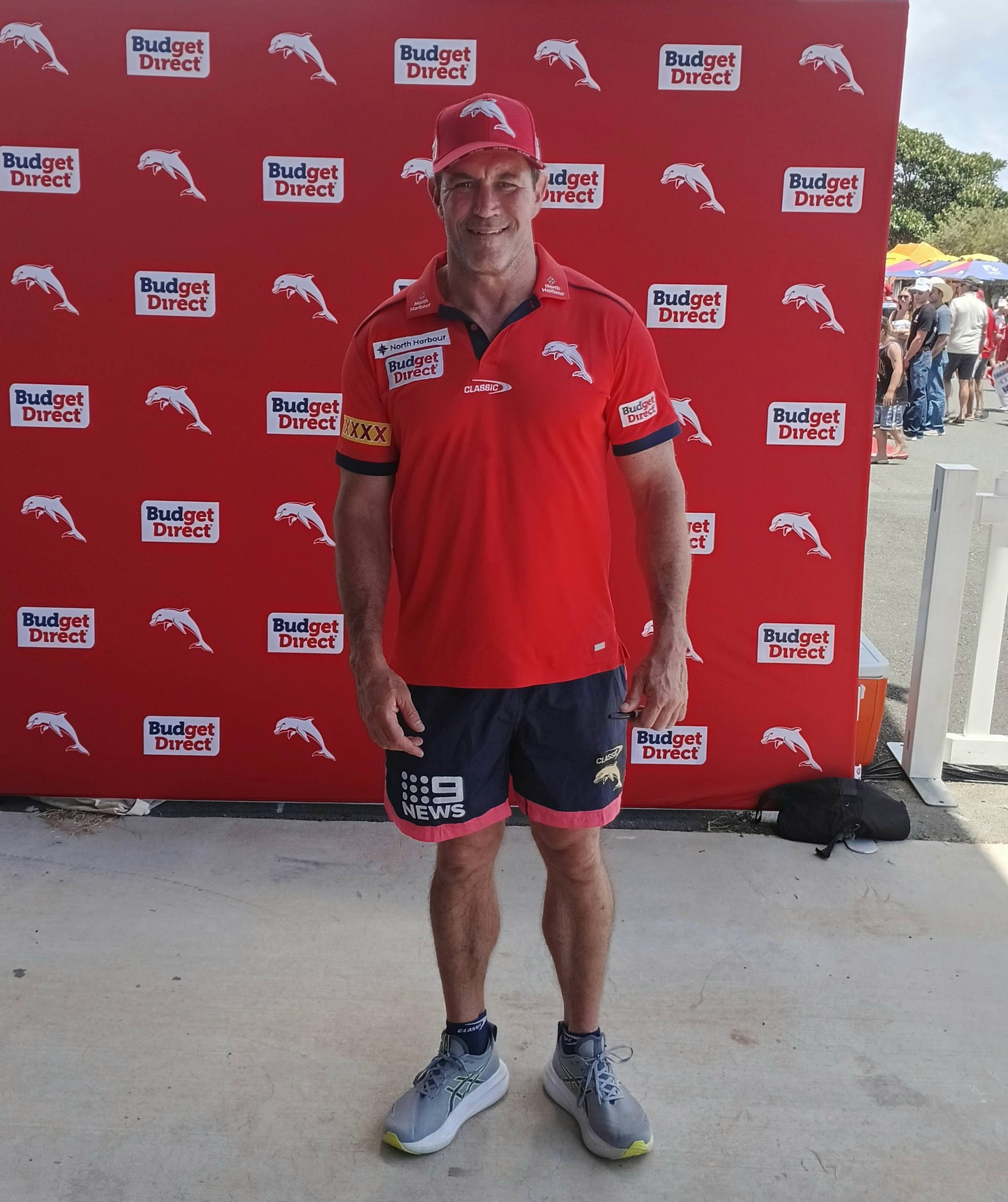
Kristian Woolf in 2026

In late 2022, Woolf was signed as an assistant coach by the Dolphins for their inaugural 2023 season in the National Rugby League competition. He became head coach for the 2025 season onwards when his mentor Wayne Bennett moved on. In his first season as head coach of the Dolphins, Woolf guided the club to a 9th placed finish on the table just two points outside of the finals positions. The club were on course to make the finals but then they suffered an end of season slump losing three of their last five matches to finish just behind the Sydney Roosters. In the 2026 NRL season, Woolf guided the club to their first ever finals campaign. The club came within one match of the grand final but were soundly beaten in the preliminary final by eventual premiers the Sydney Roosters.

== Personal life ==
Woolf is married and has four children. Woolf's younger brother, Ben, is an assistant coach with the Dolphins (NRL). Their sister, Katie Woolf, is a radio commentator on Mix 104.9 FM Darwin.

Sporting positions
Preceded by Wayne Bennett; 2023–2024	Coach Dolphins; 2025–present	Succeeded by Incumbent
