= Lewis Symonds =

Australian rugby league footballer (born 2005)

Personal information
- Born: 12 November 2005 (age 21) Oxford, Oxfordshire, England
- Height: 188 cm (6 ft 2 in)
- Weight: 97 kg (15 st 4 lb)

Playing information
- Position: Lock, Prop
Club
Years	Team	Pld	T	G	FG	P
2026–	Dolphins	1	0	0	0	0
- Source: RLP

Lewis Symonds (born 12 November 2005) is an Australian rugby league footballer for the Dolphins in the National Rugby League (NRL).

Symonds was born in England and raised in Queensland.

While a ninth grade student at Coombabah State High School, Symonds saved the life of a nine-year-old girl in Kingaroy by grabbing her away from an out-of-control car that crashed into a shopfront. His actions made national news and he was nominated by Queensland Police for a bravery award.

Symonds later moved to Marsden State High School to advance his rugby league. In 2022, Symonds had success as a track and field athlete by winning three silver medals at the 2022 Australian All Schools Championships, all in throwing events. He also competed for Australia at the Youth Oceania Championships as a powerlifter.

A forward, Symonds played his early rugby league with the Helensvale Hornets, Runaway Bay and Souths Logan Magpies. He joined the Dolphins at the end of the 2023 season and in 2024 earned representative honours with the Queensland under-19s in the State of Origin. After gaining experience with feeder club Central Queensland Capras, Symonds got his opportunity to play first-grade in the 2026 NRL season, featuring off the bench in the Dolphins' round eight match against the Warriors. He signed a contract extension at the end of the season, ensuring him a place in their Top 30 for the 2027 season.
