= John Fineanganofo =

New Zealand rugby league footballer (born 2005)

Personal information
- Born: 1 May 2005 (age 21)

Playing information
- Position: Hooker, Lock
Club
Years	Team	Pld	T	G	FG	P
2026–	Dolphins	1	0	0	0	0
- Source: RLP

John Fineanganofo (born 1 May 2005) is a New Zealand rugby league footballer for the Dolphins in the National Rugby League (NRL).

== Early life ==
Raised in Auckland, Fineanganofo is the younger brother of All Black Fehi Fineanganofo and a cousin of Roosters centre Robert Toia. He was a student at Auckland Grammar School, where he played rugby union, before joining the Dolphins academy. Completing his secondary education at Redcliffe State High School, Fineanganofo gained selection to the Australian Schoolboys representative team in 2023.

== Career ==
Fineanganofo is a forward, used mostly as a hooker and lock, while also capable of playing in the halves. After featuring in the Redcliffe Dolphins' 2023 Mal Meninga Cup premiership team, Fineanganofo made six appearance in their Queensland Cup side the following year, which included a grand final loss. He signed a contract extension in 2025, securing himself a place as a development player in 2026, and during the 2026 NRL season made his first-grade debut in round 18 against the Knights in Newcastle.
