= 2017 New Zealand Warriors season =

Team information
- CEO: Jim Doyle
- Coach: Stephen Kearney
- Assistant coach: Andrew McFadden; Stacey Jones; Steve McNamara
- Captain: Roger Tuivasa-Sheck
- Stadium: Mount Smart Stadium

Top scorers
- Tries: David Fusitua (12)
- Goals: Shaun Johnson (45)
- Points: Shaun Johnson (108)
← 2016	2018 →

The 2017 New Zealand Warriors season was the 23rd season in the club's history. Coached by Stephen Kearney and captained by Roger Tuivasa-Sheck, the Warriors competed in the National Rugby League's 2017 Telstra Premiership. They also competed in the 2017 NRL Auckland Nines tournament.

== Milestones ==
- 12 September 2016: Stephen Kearney is appointed as head coach, with former coach Andrew McFadden accepting a role as assistant coach.
- 14 December 2016: Sam Lisone is named in the World All Stars side to play in the 2017 All Stars match.
- 1 February: Roger Tuivasa-Sheck is announced as the new captain, with Simon Mannering as vice-captain.
- 5 March – round one: Isaiah Papalii made his NRL debut.
- 10 March – round two: Erin Clark made his NRL debut. Shaun Johnson scored a try and kicked two goals, surpassing Stacey Jones' 674 points as the highest point scorer for the Warriors.
- 26 March – round four: Simon Mannering played his 262nd match for the Warriors, surpassing Stacey Jones record for most appearances for the club.
- 2 April – round five: Kieran Foran made his club debut and Solomone Kata played in his 50th match for the club.
- 15 April – round seven: Blake Ayshford played in his 150th NRL match.
- 30 April – round nine: Charnze Nicoll-Klokstad made his NRL debut. The Warriors NRL community ambassador, Georgia Hale, played for the Kiwi Ferns.
- 5 May: Roger Tuivasa-Sheck, Kieran Foran, Shaun Johnson, Issac Luke and Simon Mannering represented New Zealand in the Anzac test. Chanel Harris-Tavita, Erin Clark and Isaiah Papali'i played for the Junior Kiwis.
- 6 May: In the Pacific tests: Manu Vatuvei, Tuimoala Lolohea and Mafoa'aeata Hingano represented Tonga, Ken Maumalo represented Samoa, and Charnze Nicoll-Klokstad represented the Cook Islands.
- 7 May: Matt Allwood and Toafofoa Sipley represented NSW Residents.
- 13 May – round ten: Roger Tuivasa-Sheck played in his 100th NRL match and Sam Lisone played in his 50th, all for the Warriors.
- 19 May – round eleven: Ben Matulino played in his 200th NRL match, all for the Warriors.
- 30 May: Jacob Lillyman played for Queensland in game one of the 2017 State of Origin series.
- 10 June – round fourteen: Ryan Hoffman played in his 300th NRL match.
- 22 July – round twenty: Chris Satae made his NRL debut.
- 28 July – round twenty one: James Bell made his NRL debut.
- October–December: At the 2017 Rugby League World Cup: Shaun Johnson, Simon Mannering and Roger Tuivasa-Sheck represented New Zealand; Bunty Afoa, Sam Lisone, Ken Maumalo and Jazz Tevaga represented Samoa; James Bell represented Scotland; David Fusitu'a, Ata Hingano, and Solomone Kata represented Tonga; and Bureta Faraimo represented the United States.

== Jersey and sponsors ==
Warriors Home Kit 2017

In 2017 the Warriors jerseys will again be made by Canterbury of New Zealand.

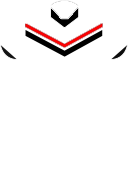

== Fixtures ==
=== Pre-season training ===
Pre-season training began on 1 November, with the exception of players involved in the 2016 Four Nations tournament.

=== Auckland Nines ===
The Warriors lost all three of their matches at the Nines.

The squad for the Nines was Ryan Hoffman, Junior Pauga, Matt Allwood, Blake Ayshford, Ata Hingano, Sam Cook, Shaun Johnson, Ruben Wiki (c), Mason Lino, Bunty Afoa, James Gavet, Tuimoala Lolohea, Jazz Tevaga, Ofahiki Ogden, Lewis Soosemea, Toafofoa Sipley, Isaiah Papalii, and James Bell. Solomone Kata was originally named, but withdrew due to a virus and was replaced by Cook.

Piha Pool
Team	Pld	W	D	L	PF	PA	PD	Pts
Parramatta Eels	3	3	0	0	66	23	+43	6
Manly Warringah Sea Eagles	3	2	0	1	50	48	+2	4
St George Illawarra Dragons	3	1	0	2	45	65	−20	2
New Zealand Warriors	3	0	0	3	21	46	−25	0

Date	Round	Opponent	Venue	Result	Score	Tries	Goals	Attendance	Report
4 February	Game 4	Manly Warringah Sea Eagles	Eden Park, Auckland	Loss	11–15	Cook, Ayshford	Hingano	22,000	
4 February	Game 12	Parramatta Eels	Eden Park, Auckland	Loss	0–11			22,000	
5 February	Game 20	St. George Illawarra Dragons	Eden Park, Auckland	Loss	10–14	Hingano, Lolohea	Hingano	22,000	

=== Pre-season matches ===
The Warriors played two trial matches, against the Melbourne Storm and the Gold Coast Titans. The match against the Titans was in Palmerston North, it was the first time the Warriors played in Palmerston North since 1995.

Date	Round	Opponent	Venue	Result	Score	Tries	Goals	Attendance	Report
11 February	Trial 1	Melbourne Storm	Sunshine Coast Stadium, Sunshine Coast	Loss	18–30	Lolohea, Aofa, Tuivasa-Sheck	Lino (2), Hingano	10,169	
19 February	Trial 2	Gold Coast Titans	Central Energy Trust Arena, Palmerston North	Win	26–6	Papalii, Lolohea, Fusitu'a, Gavet, Mannering	Johnson (3)		

=== Regular season ===
Home matches were played at Mount Smart Stadium in Auckland, with the exception of one game at Waikato Stadium in Hamilton. The Warriors also played an away game at Forsyth Barr Stadium in Dunedin.

Date	Round	Opponent	Venue	Result	Score	Tries	Goals	Attendance	Report
5 March	Round 1	Newcastle Knights	Mt Smart Stadium, Auckland	Win	26–22	Fusitu'a (3), Kata, Hoffman	Johnson (2), Luke (1)	13,712	
10 March	Round 2	Melbourne Storm	Mt Smart Stadium, Auckland	Loss	10–26	Lolohea, Johnson	Johnson (1)	9,811	
17 March	Round 3	Canterbury Bankstown Bulldogs	Forsyth Barr Stadium, Dunedin	Loss	12–24	Thompson, Johnson	Johnson (2)	10,523	
26 March	Round 4	St George Illawarra Dragons	UOW Jubilee Oval, Sydney	Loss	12–26	Luke, Maumalo	Johnson (2)	11,608	
2 April	Round 5	Gold Coast Titans	Mt Smart Stadium, Auckland	Win	28–22	Johnson, Fusitua, Tuivasa-Sheck, Foran, Hoffman	Johnson (4)	10,263	
9 April	Round 6	Parramatta Eels	Mt Smart Stadium, Auckland	Win	22–10	Thompson (2), Mannering, Maumalo	Johnson (3)	13,526	
15 April	Round 7	Canberra Raiders	GIO Stadium, Canberra	Loss	8–20	Hoffman	Johnson (2)	13,996	
25 April	Round 8	Melbourne Storm	AAMI Park, Melbourne	Loss	14–20	Fusitua (2)	Johnson (3)	22,153	
30 April	Round 9	Sydney Roosters	Mt Smart Stadium, Auckland	Win	14–13	Gavet, Fusitua	Johnson (3)	13,126	
13 May	Round 10	Penrith Panthers	Pepper Stadium, Sydney	Loss	28–36	Nicoll-Klokstad (2), Foran, Hoffman, Fusitua	Johnson (4)	11,588	
19 May	Round 11	St George Illawarra Dragons	Waikato Stadium, Hamilton	Loss	14–30	Nicoll-Klokstad (2), Matulino	Johnson (1)	11,108	
27 May	Round 12	Brisbane Broncos	Mt Smart Stadium, Auckland	Win	28–10	Ayshford, Johnson, Tuivasa-Sheck, Maumalo, Gavet	Johnson (4)	13,826	
2 June	Round 13	Parramatta Eels	ANZ Stadium, Sydney	Loss	24–32	Mannering, Maumalo, Hoffman, Tuivasa-Sheck	Johnson (4)	9,489	
10 June	Round 14	Gold Coast Titans	Cbus Super Stadium, Gold Coast	Win	34–12	Ayshford (2), Hoffman, Maumalo, Tuivasa-Sheck, Hingano	Luke (4), Hoffman (1)	14,067	
	Round 15	Bye							
23 June	Round 16	Canterbury Bankstown Bulldogs	Mt Smart Stadium, Auckland	Win	21–14	Maumalo, Ayshford, Tuivasa-Sheck	Johnson (4 & FG)	13,476	
1 July	Round 17	Manly Warringah Sea Eagles	nib Stadium, Perth	Loss	22–26	Nicoll-Klokstad (2), Thompson, Tuivasa-Sheck	Johnson (3)	6,258	
	Round 18	Bye							
14 July	Round 19	Penrith Panthers	Mt Smart Stadium, Auckland	Loss	22–34	Kata (2), Mannering, Thompson	Johnson (2); Luke (1)	13,076	
22 July	Round 20	North Queensland Cowboys	1300SMILES Stadium, Townsville	Loss	12–24	Afoa, Mannering	Luke (2)	16,080	
28 July	Round 21	Cronulla Sutherland Sharks	Mt Smart Stadium, Auckland	Loss	12–26	Kata, Thompson	Luke (2)	9,771	
5 August	Round 22	Newcastle Knights	Hunter Stadium, Newcastle	Loss	10–26	Fusitua, Roache	Luke (1)	11,824	
13 August	Round 23	Canberra Raiders	Mt Smart Stadium, Auckland	Loss	16–36	Fusitu'a, Tuivasa-Sheck, Papali'i	Lino (2)	10,182	
18 August	Round 24	South Sydney Rabbitohs	ANZ Stadium, Sydney	Loss	18–36	Tuivasa-Sheck (2), Mannering	Luke (3)	6,213	
27 August	Round 25	Manly Warringah Sea Eagles	Mt Smart Stadium, Auckland	Loss	22–21 (G.P.)	Fusitu'a (2), Ayshford, Maumalo	Luke (1), Johnson (1 & FG)	9,167	
3 September	Round 26	Wests Tigers	Leichhardt Oval, Sydney	Loss	16–28	Kata, Tuivasa-Sheck, Nicoll-Klokstad	Luke (2)	10,231	

== Ladder ==
2017 NRL season
Pos	Team	Pld	W	D	L	B	PF	PA	PD	Pts
1	Melbourne Storm (P)	24	20	0	4	2	633	336	+297	44
2	Sydney Roosters	24	17	0	7	2	500	428	+72	38
3	Brisbane Broncos	24	16	0	8	2	597	433	+164	36
4	Parramatta Eels	24	16	0	8	2	496	457	+39	36
5	Cronulla-Sutherland Sharks	24	15	0	9	2	476	407	+69	34
6	Manly-Warringah Sea Eagles	24	14	0	10	2	552	512	+40	32
7	Penrith Panthers	24	13	0	11	2	504	459	+45	30
8	North Queensland Cowboys	24	13	0	11	2	467	443	+24	30
9	St. George Illawarra Dragons	24	12	0	12	2	533	450	+83	28
10	Canberra Raiders	24	11	0	13	2	558	497	+61	26
11	Canterbury-Bankstown Bulldogs	24	10	0	14	2	360	455	−95	24
12	South Sydney Rabbitohs	24	9	0	15	2	464	564	−100	22
13	New Zealand Warriors	24	7	0	17	2	444	575	−131	18
14	Wests Tigers	24	7	0	17	2	413	571	−158	18
15	Gold Coast Titans	24	7	0	17	2	448	638	−190	18
16	Newcastle Knights	24	5	0	19	2	428	648	−220	14

== Squad ==
No.	Name	Position	Warriors debut	App	T	G	FG	Pts
115	Manu Vatuvei	WG	23 May 2004	1	0	0	0	0
125	Simon Mannering	SR	26 June 2005	22	5	0	0	20
142	Ben Matulino	PR	14 June 2008	16	1	0	0	4
146	Jacob Lillyman	PR	14 March 2009	21	0	0	0	0
168	Shaun Johnson	HB	4 June 2011	18	4	45	2	108
183	Charlie Gubb	PR	7 July 2013	11	0	0	0	0
189	David Fusitua	WG	15 March 2014	24	12	0	0	48
192	Tuimoala Lolohea	HB	27 July 2014	4	1	0	0	4
193	Solomone Kata	CE	7 March 2015	19	5	0	0	20
194	Bodene Thompson	SR	7 March 2015	19	6	0	0	24
195	Ryan Hoffman	SR	7 March 2015	19	6	1	0	26
196	Sam Lisone	PR	7 March 2015	23	0	0	0	0
197	Albert Vete	PR	7 March 2015	8	0	0	0	0
199	Matt Allwood	CE	29 March 2015	0	0	0	0	0
201	Ken Maumalo	WG	16 May 2015	23	7	0	0	28
202	Mason Lino	HB	24 August 2015	6	0	2	0	4
203	Roger Tuivasa-Sheck	FB	5 March 2016	23	10	0	0	40
204	Blake Ayshford	CE	5 March 2016	21	5	0	0	20
206	Issac Luke	HK	5 March 2016	23	1	17	0	38
207	Nathaniel Roache	HK	5 March 2016	9	1	0	0	4
208	James Gavet	PR	5 March 2016	13	2	0	0	8
209	Jazz Tevaga	HK	20 March 2016	4	0	0	0	0
210	Ligi Sao	LK	16 April 2016	11	0	0	0	0
212	Toafofoa Sipley	PR	1 May 2016	0	0	0	0	0
213	Bunty Afoa	PR	2 July 2016	17	1	0	0	4
214	Ata Hingano	FE	20 August 2016	13	1	0	0	4
215	Isaiah Papalii	PR	5 March 2017	5	1	0	0	4
216	Erin Clark	HK	10 March 2017	1	0	0	0	0
217	Kieran Foran	FE	2 April 2017	17	2	0	0	8
218	Charnze Nicoll-Klokstad	WG	30 April 2017	7	7	0	0	28
219	Chris Satae	PR	22 July 2017	3	0	0	0	0
220	James Bell	SR	28 July 2017	2	0	0	0	0
	Zac Santo	UB		0	0	0	0	0

== Staff ==
Head office staff

- Managing director: Jim Doyle
- Media and communications manager: Richard Becht
- Football operations manager: Dan Floyd
- Team manager: Laurie Hale
- Head of medical services: John Mayhew
- Recruitment and development manager: Tony Iro
- Welfare and education manager: Jerry Seuseu

Coaching staff

- NRL head coach: Stephen Kearney
- NRL assistant coach: Andrew McFadden
- NRL assistant coach: Stacey Jones
- NRL assistant coach: Steve McNamara
- NSW Cup head coach: Ricky Henry
- NSW Cup assistant coach: Jerome Ropati
- NYC head coach: Grant Pocklington
- NYC assistant coach: Boycie Nelson

== Transfers ==
Gains
Player	Previous club	Length	Notes
Kieran Foran	Free Agent	1 year	
Zac Santo	Canberra Raiders		2017 mid-season
Manaia Cherrington	Cronulla Sharks	1 1/2 years	2017 mid-season
Bureta Faraimo	Parramatta Eels	rest of season	2017 mid-season

Losses
Player	Club	Notes
Raymond Faitala-Mariner	Canterbury-Bankstown Bulldogs	2016 mid-season
Konrad Hurrell	Gold Coast Titans	2016 mid-season
Jeff Robson	Parramatta Eels	2016 mid-season
Shaun Lane	Manly-Warringah Sea Eagles	
Thomas Leuluai	Wigan Warriors	
Ben Henry	Retired	
Johnathan Wright	Manly Sea Eagles	
Sione Lousi	Townsville Blackhawks	
John Palavi	Limoux Grizzlies	
Henare Wells	Burleigh Bears	
Ali Lauitiiti	Retired	
Tuimoala Lolohea	Wests Tigers	2017 mid-season
Erin Clark	Canberra Raiders	2017 mid-season
Manu Vatuvei	Salford Red Devils	2017 mid-season

== Other teams ==
As in 2016, the Warriors entered a team into the Intrust Super Premiership NSW and the Junior Warriors competed in the Holden Cup.

=== Intrust Super Premiership NSW squad ===
The Warriors finished the season second and played the third placed Penrith Panthers in week one of the finals. After losing to eventual winners Penrith they defeated Newcastle 30–6 before losing to the Wyong Roos in a preliminary final to end the season.

Bureta Faraimo, Mason Lino and Toafofoa Sipley were named in the 2017 Intrust Super Premiership NSW Team of the Year.

==== Finals ====
Qualifying and elimination finals
Sydney Football Stadium
1	Wyong	34
4	Canterbury	26
Jubilee Oval
5	Mount Pritchard	26
8	Illawarra	30
Jubilee Oval
6	North Sydney	18
7	Newcastle	40
Jubilee Oval
2	New Zealand	20
3	Penrith	36

Semi-finals
Jubilee Oval
Canterbury-Bankstown	32
Illawarra	14
Jubilee Oval
New Zealand	30
Newcastle	6

Preliminary finals
Leichhardt Oval
Wyong	16
New Zealand	12
Leichhardt Oval
Penrith	16
Canterbury-Bankstown	12

Grand final
Leichhardt Oval
Wyong	12
Penrith	20

=== Holden Cup squad ===
The Holden Cup team finished in last place, with only three wins during the season. This was the final year of the Holden Cup.

== Awards ==
Captain Roger Tuivasa-Sheck won the club's NRL player of the year award while Simon Mannering won the people's choice award.

Mason Lino was the club's Intrust Super Premiership NSW player of the year while Chanel Harris-Tavita was the NYC player of the year.

Charnze Nicoll-Klokstad won the clubman of the year while Sam Cook was the Intrust Super Premiership NSW team man of the year and Kenese Kenese was the NYC clubman of the year.

Bunty Afoa won the NRL rookie of the year and Tyler Slade was the NYC rookie of the year.
