= 2018 New Zealand Warriors season =

- NRL rank: 8th
- 2018 record: Wins: 15; draws: 0; losses: 9
- Points scored: For: 472; against: 447

Team information
- CEO: Cameron George
- Coach: Stephen Kearney
- Assistant coach: Andrew McFadden; Stacey Jones
- Captain: Roger Tuivasa-Sheck
- Stadium: Mount Smart Stadium
- Avg. attendance: 16,830
- High attendance: 25,600 (vs. North Queensland Cowboys, round 5)

Top scorers
- Tries: David Fusitu'a (22)
- Goals: Shaun Johnson (33)
- Points: Shaun Johnson (82)
← 2017	2019 →

The 2018 New Zealand Warriors season was the 24th season in the club's history. Coached by Stephen Kearney and captained by Roger Tuivasa-Sheck, the Warriors completed the National Rugby League's 2018 Telstra Premiership regular season in the number eight position, qualifying for the finals. They were defeated in the 1st Elimination Final by Penrith and did not progress further.

== Jersey and sponsors ==
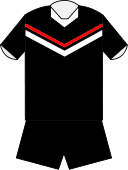

In 2018 the Warriors jerseys will again be made by Canterbury of New Zealand.

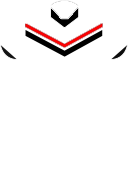

== Fixtures ==
=== Pre-season training ===
Pre-season training began on 1 November, with the exception of 14 players involved in the 2017 Rugby League World Cup.

=== Pre-season matches ===
The Warriors and Melbourne will headline a two-day festival in Rotorua that includes a regional nines tournament.

Date	Round	Opponent	Venue	Result	Score	Tries	Goals	Attendance	Report
Saturday 17 February	Trial 1	Melbourne Storm	Rotorua International Stadium, Rotorua	Win	20-14	Kata, Fusitu’a, Sao, Soosemea	Lino (2)	5,123	

=== Regular season ===
Home matches were played at Mount Smart Stadium in Auckland, while one away game was also played in New Zealand, at AMI Stadium in Christchurch.

The Warriors opened their season in Perth against the South Sydney Rabbitohs on 10 March as part of a double header at Perth Stadium. Mount Smart Stadium will hosted a double header on 7 April when the Warriors played the North Queensland Cowboys and the Wests Tigers played the Melbourne Storm.

Date	Round	Opponent	Venue	Result	Score	Tries	Goals	Attendance	Report
10 March	Round 1	South Sydney Rabbitohs	Perth Stadium, Perth (doubleheader)	Win	32 – 20	Fusitu'a (2), Papali'i, Lisone, Maumalo, Kata	Johnson (4/7)	38,842	
17 March	Round 2	Gold Coast Titans	Mount Smart Stadium, Auckland	Win	20 – 8	Fusitu'a (2), Tuivasa-Sheck, Kata	Johnson (2/4)	14,132	
24 March	Round 3	Canberra Raiders	GIO Stadium, Canberra	Win	20 – 19	Hiku, Harris, Luke	Johnson (3/3, 2 FGs)	11,963	
31 March	Round 4	Sydney Roosters	Allianz Stadium, Sydney	Win	30 – 6	Lino, Pulu, Kata, Fusitu'a	Lino (7/7)	14,493	
7 April	Round 5	North Queensland Cowboys	Mount Smart Stadium, Auckland (doubleheader)	Win	22 – 12	Fusitu'a (2), Maumalo	Johnson (5/5)	25,600	
14 April	Round 6	Brisbane Broncos	Mount Smart Stadium, Auckland	Loss	18 – 27	Fusitu'a, Green, Johnson	Johnson (3/4)	16,636	
20 April	Round 7	St. George Illawarra Dragons	Mount Smart Stadium, Auckland	Win	20 – 12	Lino, Gelling, Luke, Papali'i	Lino (2/4)	18,295	
25 April	Round 8	Melbourne Storm	AAMI Park, Melbourne	Loss	10 – 50	Fusitu'a (2)	Lino (1/2)	25,731	
5 May	Round 9	Wests Tigers	Mount Smart Stadium, Auckland	Win	26 – 4	Lawton (2), Fusitu'a, Maumalo, Johnson	Johnson (3/6)	16,727	
12 May	Round 10	Sydney Roosters	Mount Smart Stadium, Auckland	Loss	0 – 32			14,095	
18 May	Round 11	Parramatta Eels	ANZ Stadium, Sydney	Win	24 – 14	Fusitu'a, Hiku, Tevaga, Luke	Lino (4/5)	9,467	
26 May	Round 12	South Sydney Rabbitohs	Mount Smart Stadium, Auckland	Loss	10 – 30	Paasi, Kata	Luke (1/2)	15,958	
	Round 13	Bye							
9 June	Round 14	Manly-Warringah Sea Eagles	AMI Stadium, Christchurch	Win	34 – 14	Fusitu'a (3), Papali'i, Harris, Johnson	Johnson (5/6)	17,357	
15 June	Round 15	North Queensland Cowboys	1300SMILES Stadium, Townsville	Win	23 – 16	Maumalo, Tuivasa-Sheck, Kata	Johnson (6/6)	11,062	
29 June	Round 16	Cronulla-Sutherland Sharks	Mount Smart Stadium, Auckland	Loss	15 – 18	Kata, Gelling	Johnson (4/4)	14,195	
6 July	Round 17	Penrith Panthers	Panthers Stadium, Penrith	Loss	4 – 34	Maumalo	Johnson (0/1)	10,255	
15 July	Round 18	Brisbane Broncos	Suncorp Stadium, Brisbane	Win	26 – 6	Kata (2), Beale, Luke, Paasi	Johnson (3/5)	37,493	
22 July	Round 19	Melbourne Storm	Mount Smart Stadium, Auckland	Loss	6 – 12	Beale	Johnson (1/1)	17,695	
29 July	Round 20	Gold Coast Titans	Cbus Super Stadium, Robina	Loss	12 – 36	Johnson, Lawnton	Johnson (2/2)	15,159	
4 August	Round 21	St. George Illawarra Dragons	WIN Stadium, Wollongong	Win	18 – 12	Kata (2), Luke	Johnson (3/4)	13,924	
10 August	Round 22	Newcastle Knights	Mount Smart Stadium, Auckland	Win	20 – 4	Blair, Fusitu'a, Green	Johnson (4/4)	14,395	
19 August	Round 23	Canterbury-Bankstown Bulldogs	ANZ Stadium, Sydney	Loss	26 – 27	Fusitu'a (2), Beale, Hiku, Tuivasa-Sheck	Johnson (3/5)	9,688	
24 August	Round 24	Penrith Panthers	Mount Smart Stadium, Auckland	Win	36 – 16	Fusitu'a (3), Kata, Lino, Paasi	Johnson (6/8)	17,195	
31 August	Round 25	Canberra Raiders	Mount Smart Stadium, Auckland	Win	20 - 16				

== Ladder ==
Pos	Team	Pld	W	D	L	B	PF	PA	PD	Pts	
1	Sydney Roosters (M, P)	24	16	0	8	1	542	361	+181	34	Advance to finals series
2	Melbourne Storm	24	16	0	8	1	536	363	+173	34	Advance to finals series
3	South Sydney Rabbitohs	24	16	0	8	1	582	437	+145	34	Advance to finals series
4	Cronulla-Sutherland Sharks	24	16	0	8	1	519	423	+96	34	Advance to finals series
5	Penrith Panthers	24	15	0	9	1	517	461	+56	32	Advance to finals series
6	Brisbane Broncos	24	15	0	9	1	556	500	+56	32	Advance to finals series
7	St. George Illawarra Dragons	24	15	0	9	1	519	472	+47	32	Advance to finals series
8	New Zealand Warriors	24	15	0	9	1	472	447	+25	32	Advance to finals series
9	Wests Tigers	24	12	0	12	1	377	460	−83	26	
10	Canberra Raiders	24	10	0	14	1	563	540	+23	22	
11	Newcastle Knights	24	9	0	15	1	414	607	−193	20	
12	Canterbury-Bankstown Bulldogs	24	8	0	16	1	428	474	−46	18	
13	North Queensland Cowboys	24	8	0	16	1	449	521	−72	18	
14	Gold Coast Titans	24	8	0	16	1	472	582	−110	18	
15	Manly-Warringah Sea Eagles	24	7	0	17	1	500	622	−122	16	
16	Parramatta Eels (W)	24	6	0	18	1	374	550	−176	14	

Updated to match(es) played on 2 September 2018. Source: 2018 NRL Ladder
(M) Minor premiers; (P) Premiers; (W) Wooden spoon

== Squad ==
No.	Name	Position	Warriors debut	App	T	G	FG	Pts
125	Simon Mannering	SR	26 June 2005	8	0	0	0	0
168	Shaun Johnson	HB	4 June 2011	6	2	20	2	50
189	David Fusitua	WG	15 March 2014	12	12	0	0	48
191	Agnatius Paasi	PR	19 July 2014	10	1	0	0	4
193	Solomone Kata	CE	7 March 2015	10	4	0	0	16
196	Sam Lisone	PR	7 March 2015	9	1	0	0	4
197	Albert Vete	PR	7 March 2015	2	0	0	0	0
201	Ken Maumalo	WG	16 May 2015	12	3	0	0	12
202	Mason Lino	HB	24 August 2015	5	2	14	0	36
203	Roger Tuivasa-Sheck	FB	5 March 2016	11	1	0	0	4
204	Blake Ayshford	CE	5 March 2016	0	0	0	0	0
206	Issac Luke	HK	5 March 2016	11	3	1	0	14
207	Nathaniel Roache	HK	5 March 2016	0	0	0	0	0
208	James Gavet	PR	5 March 2016	7	0	0	0	0
209	Jazz Tevaga	HK	20 March 2016	9	1	0	0	4
210	Ligi Sao	LK	16 April 2016	4	0	0	0	0
213	Bunty Afoa	PR	2 July 2016	12	0	0	0	0
215	Isaiah Papalii	PR	5 March 2017	8	2	0	0	8
218	Charnze Nicoll-Klokstad	WG	30 April 2017	0	0	0	0	0
219	Chris Satae	PR	22 July 2017	3	0	0	0	0
220	James Bell	SR	28 July 2017	0	0	0	0	0
221	Peta Hiku	UB	10 March 2018	12	2	0	0	8
222	Blake Green	FE	10 March 2018	12	1	0	0	4
223	Adam Blair	PR	10 March 2018	12	0	0	0	0
224	Tohu Harris	SR	10 March 2018	11	1	0	0	4
225	Sam Cook	HK	10 March 2018	2	0	0	0	0
226	Leivaha Pulu	SR	10 March 2018	6	1	0	0	4
227	Anthony Gelling	CE	30 March 2018	5	1	0	0	4
228	Joseph Vuna	SR	25 April 2018	1	0	0	0	0
229	Karl Lawton	UB	5 May 2018	3	2	0	0	8
230	Gerard Beale	UB	18 May 2018	2	0	0	0	0
	Matiu Love-Henry	SR		0	0	0	0	0
	Zac Santo	UB		0	0	0	0	0
	Manaia Cherrington	HK		0	0	0	0	0
	Hayze Perham	FB		0	0	0	0	0
	King Vuniyawa	SR		0	0	0	0	0
	Patrick Sipley	PR		0	0	0	0	0
	Chanel Harris-Tavita	HB		0	0	0	0	0
	Junior Pauga	CE		0	0	0	0	0
	Lewis Soosemea	WG		0	0	0	0	0

== Staff ==
Head office staff

- Managing director: Cameron George
- General manager – football: Brian Smith
- Media and communications manager: Richard Becht
- Football operations manager: Dan Floyd
- Team manager: Laurie Hale
- Head of medical services: John Mayhew
- Head of recruitment: Brian Smith
- Welfare and education manager: Jerry Seuseu

Coaching staff

- NRL head coach: Stephen Kearney
- NRL assistant coach: Andrew McFadden
- NRL assistant coach: Stacey Jones
- Strength and conditioning coach: Alex Corvo
- NSW Cup head coach: Tony Iro
- Under-20s head coach: Ricky Henry
- Under-20s assistant coach: Jerome Ropati

== Transfers ==
Gains
Player	Previous club	Length	Notes
Zac Santo	Canberra Raiders	1 1/2 years	2017 mid-season
Manaia Cherrington	Cronulla Sharks	1 1/2 years	2017 mid-season
Adam Blair	Brisbane Broncos	3 years	
Peta Hiku	Warrington Wolves	3 years	
Tohu Harris	Melbourne Storm	4 years	
Leivaha Pulu	Gold Coast Titans	3 years	
Gerard Beale	Cronulla-Sutherland Sharks	3 years	
Matiu Love-Henry	Brisbane Broncos	1 year	
Agnatius Paasi	Gold Coast Titans	2 years	
Blake Green	Manly Warringah Sea Eagles	3 years	
Anthony Gelling	Wigan Warriors	1 year	
Karl Lawton	Gold Coast Titans	2 years	

Losses
Player	Club	Notes
Tuimoala Lolohea	Wests Tigers	2017 mid-season
Erin Clark	Canberra Raiders	2017 mid-season
Manu Vatuvei	Salford Red Devils	2017 mid-season
Kieran Foran	Canterbury-Bankstown Bulldogs	
Bureta Faraimo	Hull	
Ben Matulino	Wests Tigers	
Charlie Gubb	Canberra Raiders	
Ryan Hoffman	Melbourne Storm	
Toafofoa Sipley	Manly-Warringah Sea Eagles	
Matt Allwood	Released	
Jacob Lillyman	Newcastle Knights	
Bodene Thompson	Leigh Centurions	
Ata Hingano	Canberra Raiders	
