= 2014 New Zealand Warriors season =

Team information
- CEO: Wayne Scurrah
- Coach: Andrew McFadden (19 games since 5 April); Matthew Elliott (5 games)
- Assistant coach: Ricky Henry; Adam Mogg
- Captain: Simon Mannering
- Stadium: Mount Smart Stadium

Top scorers
- Tries: Manu Vatuvei (17)
- Goals: Shaun Johnson (63)
- Points: Shaun Johnson (163)
← 2013	2015 →

The 2014 New Zealand Warriors season was the 20th in the club's history. Coached by Matthew Elliott until he was replaced by Andrew McFadden in Round 6, and captained by Simon Mannering, the Warriors competed in the National Rugby League's 2014 Telstra Premiership. They finished the regular season 9th out of 16 teams, failing to make the finals for the third consecutive year. In the pre-season the Warriors also had competed in the inaugural NRL Auckland Nines tournament.

== Milestones ==
- 9 March - Round 1: Four players made their club debuts for the Warriors; Sam Tomkins, Chad Townsend, Jayson Bukuya and John Palavi.
- 15 March - Round 2: David Fusitua made his NRL debut.
- 7 April: Head coach Matthew Elliott resigned as head coach. Andrew McFadden was made acting coach.
- 13 April - Round 6: Siliva Havili made his NRL debut.
- 2 May: Shaun Johnson, Ben Henry, Simon Mannering and Siliva Havili played for New Zealand in the 2014 ANZAC Test.
- 3 May: Suaia Matagi, Michael Sio, Dominique Peyroux and Carlos Tuimavave represented Samoa in the Pacific International.
- 13 May: Andrew McFadden was appointed head coach until the end of the 2017 season.
- 1 June - Round 12: Simon Mannering played in his 200th match for the club, and his 100th as club captain. Nathan Friend also played in his 50th game for the club.
- 19 July - Round 19: Agnatius Paasi made his NRL debut.
- 27 July - Round 20: Tuimoala Lolohea made his NRL debut.
- 24 August - Round 24: Ben Matulino played in his 150th match for the club. He is the first NYC graduate from any club to reach the milestone.
- 18 October: Sam Lisone and Adam Tuimavave-Gerard played for the Junior Kiwis.
- Sam Tomkins represented England, Simon Mannering, Manu Vatuvei, Shaun Johnson, Suaia Matagi, Siliva Havili and Thomas Leuluai represented New Zealand and Dominique Peyroux and Michael Sio represented Samoa in the end of year Four Nations tournament.

== Jersey and sponsors ==
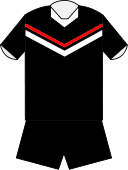

In 2014 the Warriors jerseys was again made by Canterbury of New Zealand.

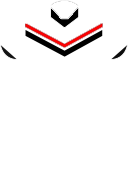

== Fixtures ==
=== Pre-season training ===
Pre-season training began on 28 October 2013.

=== Pre-season matches ===
The Warriors played the Gold Coast Titans at North Harbour Stadium on 9 February and the Brisbane Broncos at Forsyth Barr Stadium on 23 February. The Warriors also played the Wigan Warriors on Wednesday 12 February, in a warm up game before Wigan competes in the 2014 World Club Challenge.

Date	Round	Opponent	Venue	Result	Score	Tries	Goals	Attendance	Report
9 February	Trial 1	Gold Coast Titans	North Harbour Stadium, Auckland	Loss	18-32	Lolohea (2), Ikahifo	Lino (3)	7,000	
12 February	Trial 2	Wigan Warriors	Waikato Stadium, Hamilton	Loss	22-46	Townsend, Tuimavave-Gerrard, Peteru, Friend	Townsend (3)		
23 February	Trial 3	Brisbane Broncos	Forsyth Barr Stadium, Dunedin	Win	48-4	Fisiiahi (2), Hurrell (2), Johnson, Gubb, Tuimavave, Fusitua, Tomkins	Johnson (4), Townsend (2)		

=== Auckland Nines ===
The Warriors were coached by Ricky Henry. The squad consisted of Jayson Bukuya, Raymond Faitala-Mariner, Glen Fisiiahi, David Fusitua, Charlie Gubb, Konrad Hurrell, Sebastine Ikahihifo, Shaun Johnson, Solomone Kata, Ngani Laumape, Tuimoala Lolohea, Sione Lousi, Suaia Matagi, Dominique Peyroux, Sam Tomkins, Carlos Tuimavave. At the conclusion of the weekend Shaun Johnson was named the tournament's MVP and Suaia Matagi was named in the team of the tournament.

Pos	Team	Pld	W	D	L	PF	PA	PD	Pts
1	New Zealand Warriors	3	3	0	0	80	41	+39	6
2	North Queensland Cowboys	3	1	0	2	55	45	+10	2
3	Canberra Raiders	3	1	0	2	32	53	−21	2
4	Manly Warringah Sea Eagles	3	1	0	2	25	53	−28	2

Date	Round	Opponent	Venue	Result	Score	Tries	Goals	Report
15 February	Nines 1	Canberra Raiders	Eden Park, Auckland	Win	25-14	Johnson, Fisiiahi, Matagi, Kata	Johnson (3), Tomkins	
15 February	Nines 2	Manly Sea Eagles	Eden Park, Auckland	Win	27-4	Johnson, Kata, Peyroux, Fusitua, Lolohea	Johnson (3)	
16 February	Nines 3	North Queensland Cowboys	Eden Park, Auckland	Win	28-23	Ikahihifo (2), Johnson, Tuimavave, Laumape	Johnson (3)	
16 February	Quarter	South Sydney Rabbitohs	Eden Park, Auckland	Win	17-16	Johnson, Fisiiahi, Laumape	Johnson, Tomkins	
16 February	Semi	North Queensland Cowboys	Eden Park, Auckland	Loss	0-8			

Quarter-Finals
Newcastle Knights	11
Brisbane Broncos	16
Parramatta Eels	6
Cronulla Sharks	17
New Zealand Warriors	17
South Sydney Rabbitohs	16
Penrith Panthers	12
North Queensland Cowboys	22

Semi-Finals
Brisbane Broncos	18
Cronulla Sharks	14
New Zealand Warriors	0
North Queensland Cowboys	8

Final
Brisbane Broncos	7
North Queensland Cowboys	16

=== Regular season ===
The Warriors played eight home matches at Mount Smart Stadium, three at Eden Park and another at Westpac Stadium in Wellington. Their loss to the Panthers in the final round saw the Warriors finish the season in 9th place, only just missing out on the finals. This was an improvement on their 11th-placed finish in 2013 and their 14th-placed finish in 2012.

Date	Round	Opponent	Venue	Result	Score	Tries	Goals	Attendance	Report
9 March	Round 1	Parramatta Eels	Pirtek Stadium, Sydney	Loss	16-36	Vatuvei, Tuimavave, Fisiiahi	Johnson (2)	14,397	
15 March	Round 2	St George Illawarra Dragons	Eden Park, Auckland	Loss	12-31	Tomkins, Ropati	Johnson (2)	14,392	
22 March	Round 3	North Queensland Cowboys	1300SMILES Stadium, Townsville	Win	20-16	Fisiiahi (2), Lousi, Hurrell	Johnson (2)	12,738	
30 March	Round 4	Wests Tigers	Westpac Stadium, Wellington	Win	42-18	Fisiiahi (4), Johnson, Vatuvei, Bukuya, Tomkins	Johnson (5)	22,512	
5 April	Round 5	Cronulla-Sutherland Sharks	Remondis Stadium, Sydney	Loss	6-37	Vatuvei	Johnson (1)	11,307	
13 April	Round 6	Canterbury-Bankstown Bulldogs	Eden Park, Auckland	Loss	20-21	Tomkins, Vatuvei, Hurrell, Mannering	Johnson (2)	22,160	
19 April	Round 7	St George Illawarra Dragons	WIN Jubilee Oval, Sydney	Loss	10-20	Tomkins, Vatuvei	Johnson (1)	10,559	
25 April	Round 8	Melbourne Storm	AAMI Park, Melbourne	Win	16-10	Fusitua, Mateo, Johnson	Johnson (2)	28,716	
10 May	Round 9	Canberra Raiders	Eden Park, Auckland	Win	54-12	Johnson (2), Vatuvei (2), Matulino, Hurrell, Laumape, Tomkins, Bukuya	Johnson (9)	18,165	
18 May	Round 10	Canterbury-Bankstown Bulldogs	Waikato Stadium, Hamilton	Loss	12-16	Matulino, Henry	Johnson (2)	17,673	
24 May	Round 11	Gold Coast Titans	Robina Stadium, Gold Coast	Win	24-16	Fusitua (2), Matulino, Johnson, Mannering	Townsend (2)	18,753	
1 June	Round 12	Newcastle Knights	Mount Smart Stadium, Auckland	Win	38-18	Mannering (2), Vatuvei (2), Tomkins, Townsend, Hurrell	Johnson (5)	19,068	
7 June	Round 13	South Sydney Rabbitohs	nib Stadium, Perth	Loss	18-34	Fusitua, Johnson, Mannering, Hurrell	Johnson (1)	20,267	
	Round 14	Bye							
21 June	Round 15	Brisbane Broncos	Mount Smart Stadium, Auckland	Win	19-10	Henry, Hurrell, Townsend	Johnson (3 & FG)	16,025	
29 June	Round 16	Penrith Panthers	Mount Smart Stadium, Auckland	Win	30-20	Hurrell (2), Vatuvei, Mannering, Johnson	Johnson (5)	12,801	
	Round 17	Bye							
12 July	Round 18	Parramatta Eels	Mount Smart Stadium, Auckland	Win	48-0	Tomkins (2), Fusitua, Johnson, Hurrell, Mannering, Henry, Townsend	Johnson (8)	14,087	
19 July	Round 19	Brisbane Broncos	Suncorp Stadium, Brisbane	Loss	22-28	Henry (2), Mannering, Tomkins	Johnson (3)	37,082	
27 July	Round 20	Manly Warringah Sea Eagles	Mount Smart Stadium, Auckland	Loss	12-22	Hurrell, Mannering	Townsend (2)	19,199	
3 August	Round 21	Canberra Raiders	GIO Stadium, Canberra	Win	54-18	Vatuvei (3), Rapira (2), Lousi, Tomkins, Hurrell, Matulino, Laumape	Townsend (7)	7,094	
10 August	Round 22	Cronulla-Sutherland Sharks	Mount Smart Stadium, Auckland	Win	16-12	Laumape (2), Vatuvei	Townsend (2)	13,939	
16 August	Round 23	Newcastle Knights	Hunter Stadium, Newcastle	Loss	22-28	Fusitua (2), Vatuvei (2), Friend	Townsend (1)	12,733	
23 August	Round 24	Sydney Roosters	Mount Smart Stadium, Auckland	Loss	12-46	Tomkins, Laumape	Johnson (2)	19,676	
30 August	Round 25	Gold Coast Titans	Mount Smart Stadium, Auckland	Win	42-0	Tomkins (2), Henry, Peyroux, Friend, Hurrell, Johnson	Johnson (7)	13,540	
6 September	Round 26	Penrith Panthers	Centrebet Stadium, Sydney	Loss	6-22	Vatuvei	Johnson (1)	13,551	

== Ladder ==
2014 NRL season
Pos	Team	Pld	W	D	L	B	PF	PA	PD	Pts
1	Sydney Roosters	24	16	0	8	2	615	385	+230	36
2	Manly Warringah Sea Eagles	24	16	0	8	2	502	399	+103	36
3	South Sydney Rabbitohs (P)	24	15	0	9	2	585	361	+224	34
4	Penrith Panthers	24	15	0	9	2	506	426	+80	34
5	North Queensland Cowboys	24	14	0	10	2	596	406	+190	32
6	Melbourne Storm	24	14	0	10	2	536	460	+76	32
7	Canterbury-Bankstown Bulldogs	24	13	0	11	2	446	439	+7	30
8	Brisbane Broncos	24	12	0	12	2	549	456	+93	28
9	New Zealand Warriors	24	12	0	12	2	571	491	+80	28
10	Parramatta Eels	24	12	0	12	2	477	580	−103	28
11	St. George Illawarra Dragons	24	11	0	13	2	469	528	−59	26
12	Newcastle Knights	24	10	0	14	2	463	571	−108	24
13	Wests Tigers	24	10	0	14	2	420	631	−211	24
14	Gold Coast Titans	24	9	0	15	2	372	538	−166	22
15	Canberra Raiders	24	8	0	16	2	466	623	−157	20
16	Cronulla-Sutherland Sharks	24	5	0	19	2	334	613	−279	14

== Squad ==
No.	Name	Position	Warriors debut	App	T	G	FG	Pts
105	Thomas Leuluai	HB	2 May 2003	12	0	0	0	0
108	Jerome Ropati	CE	31 August 2003	3	1	0	0	4
115	Manu Vatuvei	WG	23 May 2004	23	17	0	0	68
125	Simon Mannering	SR	26 June 2005	24	9	0	0	36
131	Sam Rapira	PR	20 May 2006	18	2	0	0	8
142	Ben Matulino	PR	14 June 2008	20	4	0	0	20
146	Jacob Lillyman	PR	14 March 2009	24	0	0	0	0
152	Kevin Locke	FB	31 May 2009	2	0	0	0	0
159	Sione Lousi	SR	14 March 2010	11	2	0	0	8
163	Glen Fisiiahi	FB	12 March 2011	5	7	0	0	28
164	Feleti Mateo	SR	12 March 2011	19	1	0	0	4
168	Shaun Johnson	HB	4 June 2011	21	9	63	1	163
171	Ben Henry	SR	4 March 2012	16	6	0	0	24
172	Nathan Friend	HK	4 March 2012	24	2	0	0	8
173	Konrad Hurrell	CE	4 March 2012	19	12	0	0	48
175	Sam Lousi	SR	21 July 2012	1	0	0	0	0
176	Sebastine Ikahihifo	LK	28 July 2012	18	0	0	0	0
177	Carlos Tuimavave	FE	5 August 2012	1	1	0	0	4
178	Dane Nielsen	CE	9 March 2013	13	0	0	0	0
180	Ngani Laumape	WG	24 March 2013	16	5	0	0	20
181	Suaia Matagi	PR	11 May 2013	24	0	0	0	0
182	Dominique Peyroux	CE	3 June 2013	4	1	0	0	4
183	Charlie Gubb	PR	7 July 2013	5	0	0	0	0
185	Sam Tomkins	FB	9 March 2014	24	13	0	0	52
186	Chad Townsend	HB	9 March 2014	19	3	14	0	40
187	Jayson Bukuya	SR	9 March 2014	18	2	0	0	8
188	John Palavi	PR	9 March 2014	2	0	0	0	0
189	David Fusitua	WG	15 March 2014	12	7	0	0	28
190	Siliva Havili	HK	13 April 2014	6	0	0	0	0
191	Agnatius Paasi	PR	19 July 2014	1	0	0	0	0
192	Tuimoala Lolohea	HB	27 July 2014	3	0	0	0	0

== Staff ==
- Chief executive officer: Wayne Scurrah
- General manager: Don Mann Jr
- General manager football operations: Dean Bell
- Medical services manager: John Mayhew
- Welfare and education manager: Jerry Seuseu
- Media and communications manager: Richard Becht

=== Coaching staff ===
- NRL head coach: Andrew McFadden
- NRL assistant coach: Ricky Henry
- NRL assistant coach: Adam Mogg
- NSW Cup head coach: Rohan Smith
- NSW assistant coach: Willie Swan
- NYC head coach: Stacey Jones
- NYC assistant coach: Kelvin Wright
- Academy and pathways manager: Duane Mann

=== Strength and conditioning ===
- Strength and conditioning coach: Carl Jennings
- Strength and conditioning coach: Ruben Wiki
- Sports science manager: Brad Morris
- Rehab and speed coach: Dayne Norton
- Performance analyst: Adam Sadler

== Transfers ==
=== Gains ===
Player	Previous club	Length	Notes
Sam Tomkins	Wigan Warriors	3 years	World Record Transfer fee
Chad Townsend	Cronulla Sharks		
Jayson Bukuya	Cronulla Sharks		

=== Losses ===
Player	Club	Notes
Russell Packer	Newcastle Knights	
Elijah Taylor	Penrith Panthers	
Steve Rapira	Salford Red Devils	
Sio Siua Taukeiaho	Sydney Roosters	
Bill Tupou	Canberra Raiders	Left mid-2013
Alehana Mara	Released	
Todd Lowrie	Brisbane Broncos	
Pita Godinet	Wakefield Trinity Wildcats	

== Other teams ==
The Warriors entered a team into the NSW Cup for the first time. The team replaced the Auckland Vulcans, who the club previously helped to fund. The Junior Warriors again competed in the Holden Cup.

=== NSW Cup squad ===
The NSW Cup side were coached by Rohan Smith. It was the first time that the team had a full-time coach. In June the team took a match to Gisborne's Rugby Park.

The side finished eighth in regular season and made the finals, defeating the Mount Pritchard Mounties 36-28 in the elimination finals. They were eliminated the next week, losing 12-29 to the Illawarra Cutters.

Raymond Faitala-Mariner was named in the NSW Cup team of the year.

Qualifying and elimination finals
1	Penrith Panthers	42
4	Illawarra Cutters	6
5	Mounties	28
8	NZ Warriors	36
6	Wests Tigers	6
7	Wyong Roos	28
2	Newcastle Knights	24
3	Wentworthville Magpies	12

Semi-finals
Illawarra Cutters	29
NZ Warriors	12
Wentworthville Magpies	29
Wyong Roos	16

Preliminary finals
Penrith Panthers	31
Wentworthville Magpies	12
Newcastle Knights	34
Illawarra Cutters	10

Grand final
Penrith Panthers	48
Newcastle Knights	12

=== Holden Cup Squad ===
The Junior Warriors won the Holden Cup by defeating the Brisbane Broncos 34-32 in the grand final. The Junior Warriors had finished eighth in the regular season, just qualifying for the finals series. In the finals they defeated the Sydney Roosters 44-30 in the elimination finals.

The Grand Final team was: Brad Abbey, Ngataua Hukatai, Nathaniel Roache, Solomone Kata, Paul Ulberg, Tuimoala Lolohea, Mason Lino (c), Sam Lisone (c), Kurt Robinson, Kouma Samson, Michael Ki, Adam Tuimavave-Gerrard, Jazz Tevaga. Interchange: James Bell, Toafofoa Sipley, Ken Maumalo, Iulio Afoa. Coach: Stacey Jones.

Sam Lisone was named at prop in the Holden Cup team of the year. Solomone Kata won the Jack Gibson Medal as the grand final player of the match.

Qualifying and elimination finals
1	Newcastle Knights	22
4	St. George-Illawarra Dragons	30
5	Sydney Roosters	30
8	NZ Warriors	44
6	Wests Tigers	28
7	South Sydney Rabbitohs	24
2	Brisbane Broncos	26
3	Parramatta Eels	32

Semi-finals
Newcastle Knights	16
NZ Warriors	23
Wests Tigers	18
Brisbane Broncos	42

Preliminary finals
St. George-Illawarra Dragons	16
Brisbane Broncos	24
NZ Warriors	29
Parramatta Eels	26

Grand final
Brisbane Broncos	32
New Zealand Warriors	34

== Awards ==
Simon Mannering was named the NRL Player of the Year and also received a Legacy award. Konrad Hurrell won the People's Choice Award while Manu Vatuvei was the Club Person of the Year and the Players' Player of the Year. David Fusitu’a was the NRL Rookie of the Year.

The NSW Cup Player of the Year was Agnatius Paasi, who also won the NSW Cup Players' Player of the Year award. Tuimoala Lolohea was the NSW Cup Rookie of the Year.

Sam Lisone won the NYC Player of the Year and NYC Players' Player of the Year awards while Brad Abbey was the NYC Rookie of the Year.
