= Bunty Afoa =

Samoan rugby league footballer

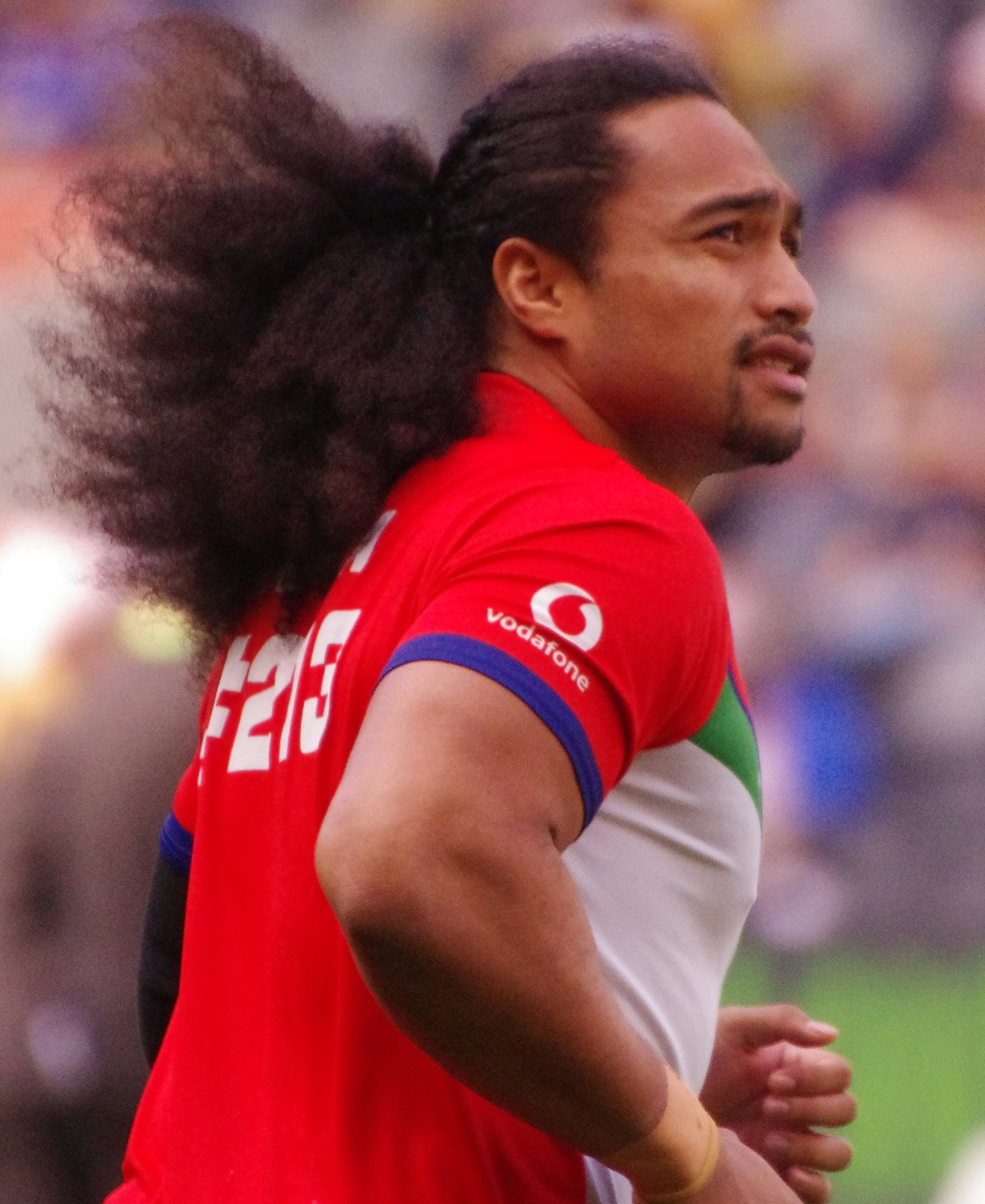

Personal information
- Full name: Iulio Afoa
- Born: 20 August 1996 (age 30) Auckland, New Zealand
- Height: 188 cm (6 ft 2 in)
- Weight: 113 kg (17 st 11 lb)

Playing information
- Position: Prop
Club
Years	Team	Pld	T	G	FG	P
2016–25	New Zealand Warriors	145	8	0	0	32
2026–	Wests Tigers	10	0	0	0	0
	Total	155	8	0	0	32
Representative
Years	Team	Pld	T	G	FG	P
2016–22	Samoa	8	0	0	0	0
2019	Samoa 9s	3	0	0	0	0
- Source: As of 29 August 2026

Iulio "Bunty" Afoa (born 20 August 1996) is a Samoan international rugby league footballer who plays for the Wests Tigers in the National Rugby League (NRL).

Bunty was previously the longest-serving player at the New Zealand Warriors, with an unbroken sequence that stretched across 10 seasons.

== Background ==
Afoa was born in Auckland, New Zealand, and is of Samoan descent and attended St Paul's College.

He played his junior rugby league for the Point Chevalier Pirates, before being signed by the New Zealand Warriors.

== Playing career ==
=== Early career ===
From 2014 to 2016, Afoa played for the New Zealand Warriors' NYC team. In May 2015, he was selected as 18th man for the Junior Kiwis side to play the Junior Kangaroos. Afoa played in his 50th Holden Cup match in 2015 and was named the Junior Warriors player of the year at the end of the season.

=== 2016 ===
On 23 June, Afoa re-signed with the Warriors on a three-year contract until the end of 2019. In Round 17 of the 2016 NRL season, he made his NRL debut for the Warriors against the Gold Coast Titans. On 8 October, he made his international debut for Samoa in their historical test match against Fiji in Apia.

=== 2017 ===
In the 2017 NRL season, Afoa made 17 appearances as the club finished a disappointing 13th on the table.

=== 2018 ===
Afoa made 23 appearances for New Zealand in the 2018 NRL season as the club qualified for the finals for the first time since 2011. Afoa played in the club's elimination final loss to Penrith.

=== 2019 ===
Afoa played 20 games for New Zealand in the 2019 NRL season as the club missed out on the finals.

=== 2020 ===
On 18 February, Afoa was ruled out for the entire 2020 NRL season after suffering an ACL injury at pre-season training.

=== 2021 ===
On 10 June, the New Zealand Warriors announced that Afoa had signed a new two-year contract.

=== 2022 ===
In round 13 of the 2022 NRL season, Afoa was sent to the sin bin for a professional foul and later scored a try in New Zealand's 44–12 loss against Manly. Afoa made a total of 24 appearances for the New Zealand club as they finished 15th on the table.

=== 2023 ===
Afoa played 21 games for the New Zealand Warriors in the 2023 NRL season as the club finished 4th on the table and qualified for the finals.

=== 2024 ===
Afoa played nine games for the New Zealand Warriors in the 2024 NRL season which saw the club finish 13th on the table.

=== 2025 ===
Afoa played seven games for the New Zealand Warriors in the 2025 NRL season which saw the club finish 5th on the table. The New Zealand Warriors confirmed that Afoa was one of five players released by the club at the end of their season. On 28 September, Afoa played in the New Zealand Warriors NSW Cup grand final victory against St. George Illawarra. On 10 October, the Wests Tigers announced that they had signed Afoa for the 2026 season.

=== 2026 ===
Afoa was limited to just ten games for the Wests Tigers in the 2026 NRL season as the club finished 15th on the table.

== Statistics ==
As of 20 July 2025.

=== NRL ===
Season	Team	Matches	Tries	Pts
2016	New Zealand Warriors	4	2	8
2017	New Zealand Warriors	17	1	4
2018	New Zealand Warriors	23	0	0
2019	New Zealand Warriors	20	1	4
2021	New Zealand Warriors	20	2	8
2022	New Zealand Warriors	24	1	4
2023	New Zealand Warriors	21	1	4
2024	New Zealand Warriors	9	0	0
2025	New Zealand Warriors	7	0	0
2026	Wests Tigers	5		
Career totals		150	8	32
