= Charnze Nicoll-Klokstad =

Cook Islands, New Zealand & Maori international rugby league footballer

Charnze Nicoll Klokstad
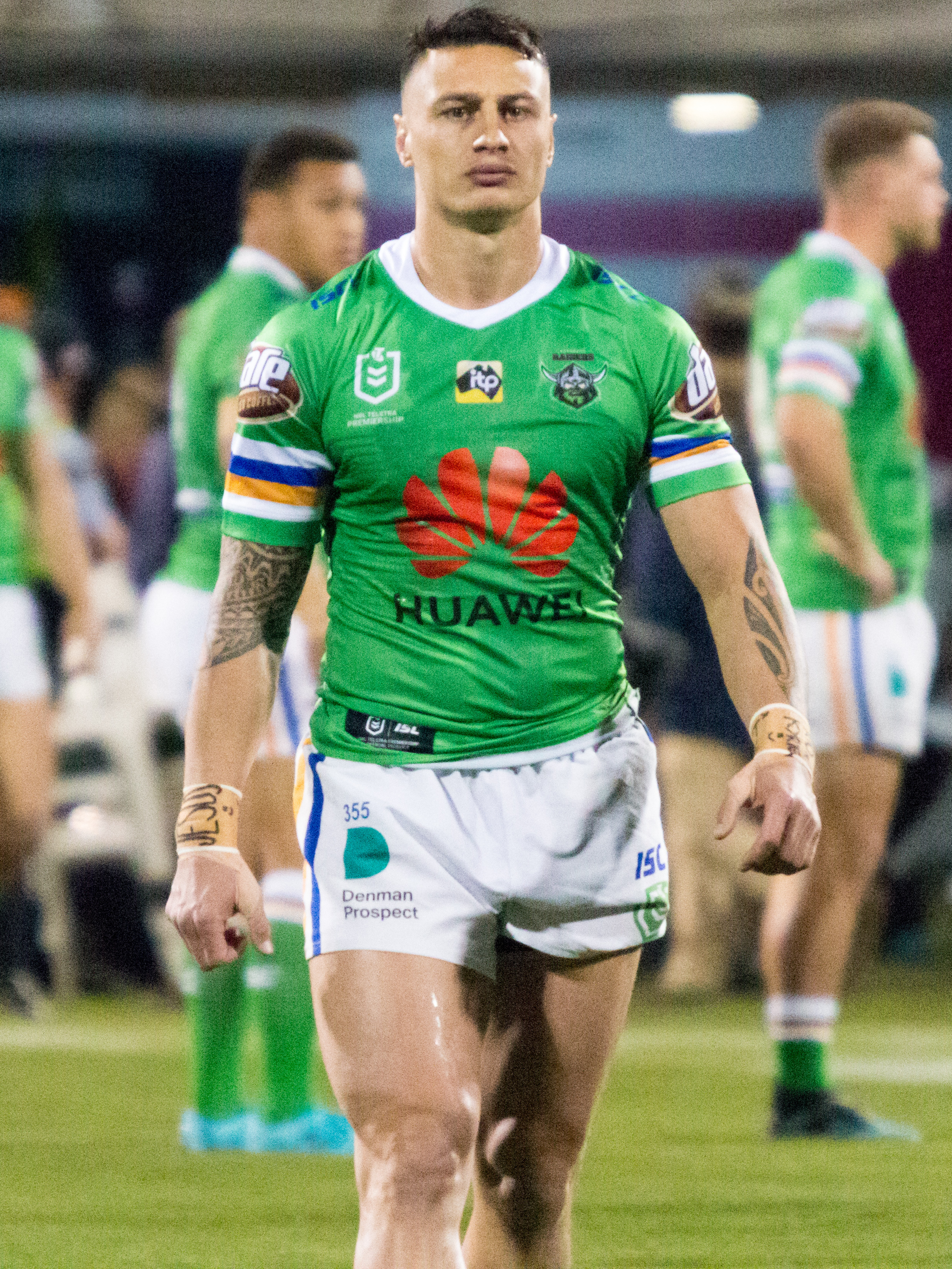

Personal information
- Full name: Charnze Nicoll-Klokstad
- Born: 2 August 1995 (age 31) Auckland, New Zealand
- Height: 182 cm (6 ft 0 in)
- Weight: 96 kg (15 st 2 lb)

Playing information
- Position: Fullback, Centre, Wing
Club
Years	Team	Pld	T	G	FG	P
2017–18	New Zealand Warriors	7	7	0	0	28
2019–22	Canberra Raiders	66	23	0	0	92
2023–	New Zealand Warriors	78	27	0	0	108
	Total	151	57	0	0	228
Representative
Years	Team	Pld	T	G	FG	P
2015–17	Cook Islands	3	1	0	0	4
2019–	New Zealand	18	7	0	0	28
2021–26	Māori All Stars	3	0	0	0	0
- Source: As of 21 November 2026

Charnze Nicoll-Klokstad (born 2 August 1995) is a professional rugby league footballer who plays as a fullback for the New Zealand Warriors in the National Rugby League (NRL), the New Zealand Māori in the All-Stars and the Cook Islands and New Zealand at international level.

He previously played for the Warriors as a winger and the Canberra Raiders where he played as a fullback and featured in the 2019 NRL Grand Final. He has played for both Cook Islands and New Zealand at international level, playing as a winger, fullback, centre and five-eighth.

== Background ==
Nicoll-Klokstad was born in Auckland, New Zealand, and is of Cook Islands, Māori (Ngāti Tūwharetoa), and Norwegian descent. He played his junior rugby league for the Mount Albert Lions, the Waitemata Seagulls, the Richmond Rovers, and the City Newton Dragons in New Zealand before moving to Melbourne, Australia as a 15-year old, playing for the Altona Roosters.

== Playing career ==
=== Early career ===
Nicoll-Klokstad was signed by the Melbourne Storm and played for their S. G. Ball Cup team before joining their NYC team for 2014 and 2015, playing in 37 matches and scoring 16 tries. In 2014, Nicoll-Klokstad received Melbourne's NYC back of the year and the Greg Brentnall Young Achievers' Award. On 17 October 2015, Nicoll-Klokstad represented Cook Islands in their World Cup qualification match against Tonga, playing on the wing and scoring the first try of the match in their 28–8 loss at Campbelltown Stadium. On 23 October 2015, Nicoll-Klokstad signed with the New Zealand Warriors on a 2-year contract starting in 2016.

On 8 May 2016, Nicoll-Klokstad played at fullback for the Cook Islands in their international against Lebanon, in the 30–20 win at Belmore Oval. After playing every game for the Warriors in the Intrust Super Premiership NSW in 2016, and winning their ISP player of the year award, Nicoll-Klokstad was named at centre in the 2016 ISP Team of the Year.

=== 2017 ===
In Round 9 of the 2017 NRL season, Nicoll-Klokstad made his NRL debut for the New Zealand Warriors against the Sydney Roosters, playing on the wing in the 14–13 win at Mt Smart Stadium. On 6 May 2017, Nicoll-Klokstad played for the Cook Islands in their 2017 Pacific Test against Papua New Guinea, playing at fullback in the 32–22 loss at Campbelltown Stadium. In his next match in Round 10 against the Penrith Panthers, Nicoll-Klokstad scored his first and second NRL career tries in the Warriors 36–28 loss as they blew up a 28–6 halftime lead at Penrith Stadium. On 13 June 2017, Nicoll-Klokstad re-signed a two-year contract with the Warriors, until the end of the 2019 season.

=== 2018 ===
Nicoll-Klokstad was unable to break into the Warriors first grade squad for the 2018 NRL season, making no appearances in the year after being stuck behind David Fusitu’a and Ken Maumalo.

=== 2019 ===
On 8 February 2019, Nicoll-Klokstad was granted a release from his contract with the Warriors to take up a two-year deal with the Canberra Raiders. In Round 1 of the 2019 NRL season, Nicoll-Klokstad made his club debut for the Canberra Raiders against the Gold Coast Titans, playing at fullback in the 21–0 win at Robina Stadium. In Round 3 against the Newcastle Knights, Nicoll-Klokstad scored his first and second club tries for the Raiders in the 17–10 win at Canberra Stadium.

Nicoll-Klokstad made a total of 26 appearances for Canberra and scored 11 tries in the 2019 NRL season as he enjoyed a breakout season. Canberra would go on to qualify for their first grand final in 25 years. Nicoll-Klokstad played at fullback for Canberra in the 2019 NRL Grand Final in which Canberra were defeated by the Sydney Roosters at ANZ Stadium.

=== 2020 ===
In the 2020 NRL season, he made 21 appearances as Canberra finished 5th and qualified for the finals. He played in all three finals games including the preliminary final loss to Melbourne at Suncorp Stadium.

=== 2021 ===
In round 5 of the 2021 NRL season, he suffered a neck injury in Canberra's 30–10 loss against Penrith. Nicoll-Klokstad was later ruled out for eight weeks.

Nicoll-Klokstad returned to the Canberra side for their round 23 match against Manly. He came on in the second half and with his first carry of the ball lost it forward. From the resulting play Manly scored a crucial try and eventually won the game 19–18.

=== 2022 ===
On 6 July, it was announced that Nicoll-Klokstad would depart the Canberra club at the end of the 2022 NRL season and re-join his previous club the New Zealand Warriors starting in 2023.

=== 2023 ===
Nicoll-Klokstad made his first appearance back for the New Zealand Warriors in round 1 of the 2023 NRL season scoring a try during the clubs 20–12 victory over Newcastle. He played 23 games for the New Zealand Warriors in the 2023 NRL season as the club finished 4th on the table and qualified for the finals. Nicoll-Klokstad played in all three finals games as the club reached the preliminary final before being defeated by Brisbane.

=== 2024 ===
In round 14 of the 2024 NRL season, he scored two tries for New Zealand in their 42–12 victory over North Queensland. He played 17 matches for the New Zealand Warriors in the 2024 NRL season which saw the club finish 13th on the table.

=== 2025 ===
On 23 April, the New Zealand Warriors announced that they had re-signed Nicoll-Klokstad for a further two years. He played 22 games with New Zealand in the 2025 NRL season as the club finished 6th on the table and qualified for the finals. They were eliminated by Penrith in the first week of the finals.

=== 2026 ===
In February 2026, Nicoll-Klokstad was named to start at five-eighth for the Māori All Stars in the 2026 All Stars fixture at FMG Stadium Waikato. On 21 June, Nicoll-Klokstad scored four tries for the Warriors in a 38–20 win against the North Queensland Cowboys at Te Kaha, Christchurch. This match was the first ever rugby league match at Te Kaha. He played 17 games for the New Zealand Warriors in the 2026 NRL season as the club finished second on the table but were eliminated from the finals in straight sets.

== Statistics ==
Season	Team	Matches	Tries	Pts
2017	New Zealand Warriors	7	7	28
2019	Canberra Raiders	26	11	44
2020	Canberra Raiders	22	7	28
2021	Canberra Raiders	8	3	12
2022	Canberra Raiders	11	2	8
2023	New Zealand Warriors	23	7	28
2024	New Zealand Warriors	17	6	24
2025	New Zealand Warriors	22	2	8
2026	New Zealand Warriors	16	12	48
2027	New Zealand Warriors			
	Totals	151	57	228
