= Matthew Allwood =

Australian rugby league footballer

Matt Allwood
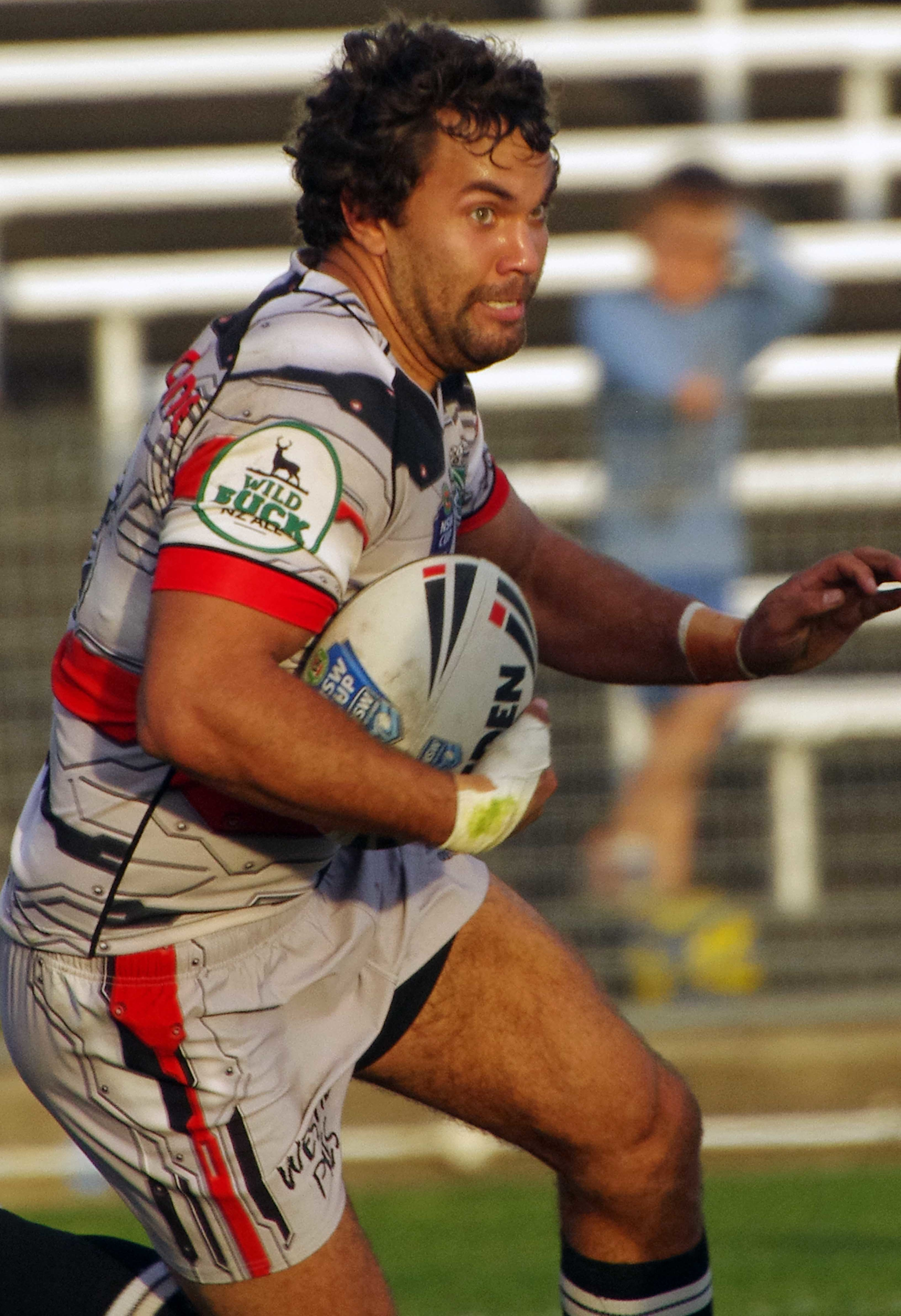

Personal information
- Full name: Matthew Allwood
- Born: 16 November 1992 (age 33) Scone, New South Wales, Australia
- Height: 185 cm (6 ft 1 in)
- Weight: 93 kg (14 st 9 lb)

Playing information
- Position: Centre, Wing
Club
Years	Team	Pld	T	G	FG	P
2014	Canberra Raiders	11	1	0	0	4
2015–17	New Zealand Warriors	7	6	0	0	16
	Total	18	7	0	0	20
Representative
Years	Team	Pld	T	G	FG	P
2017	NSW Residents	1	0	0	0	0
- Source: As of 10 January 2024

Matthew Allwood (born 16 November 1992) is an Australian former professional rugby league footballer who previously played as a centre and wing for the New Zealand Warriors and Canberra Raiders in the National Rugby League.

== Background ==
Born in Scone, New South Wales, Allwood played his junior football for Farrer Memorial Agricultural High School before being signed by the Canberra Raiders.

== Playing career ==
As a youngster, Allwood played for the Country New South Wales Under 17s and Under 18s teams and the New South Wales Combined High Schools team. In 2011 and 2012, Allwood played for the Canberra Raiders' NYC team before moving on to the Raiders' New South Wales Cup team, the Mount Pritchard Mounties in 2013.

=== Canberra Raiders ===
In round 1 of the 2014 season, Allwood made his NRL debut for Canberra against the North Queensland Cowboys at centre in the Raiders 28–22 loss at 1300SMILES Stadium. In Round 7 against the Melbourne Storm, Allwood scored his first NRL career try in Canberra's 24-22 last minute win at Canberra Stadium. Allwood finished his debut year in the NRL with him playing in 11 matches and scoring a try for the capital club. Due to an off-field incident, Allwood was released before the season ended.

=== New Zealand Warriors ===
On 20 May 2014 it was announced that Allwood had signed a three-year contract with the New Zealand Warriors starting in 2015. Allwood played a total of seven games for the New Zealand Warriors. He was contracted with the club until the end of 2017 but mainly played for the clubs NSW Cup team. In 2018, Allwood played for Newcastle in the NSW Cup. He joined the Warriors when their pre-season began in November 2014.

== Post playing ==
Allwood competed in the 2025 season of the SBS series Alone Australia, and lasted 16 days in the wilderness.
