= Issac Luke =

New Zealand international rugby league footballer

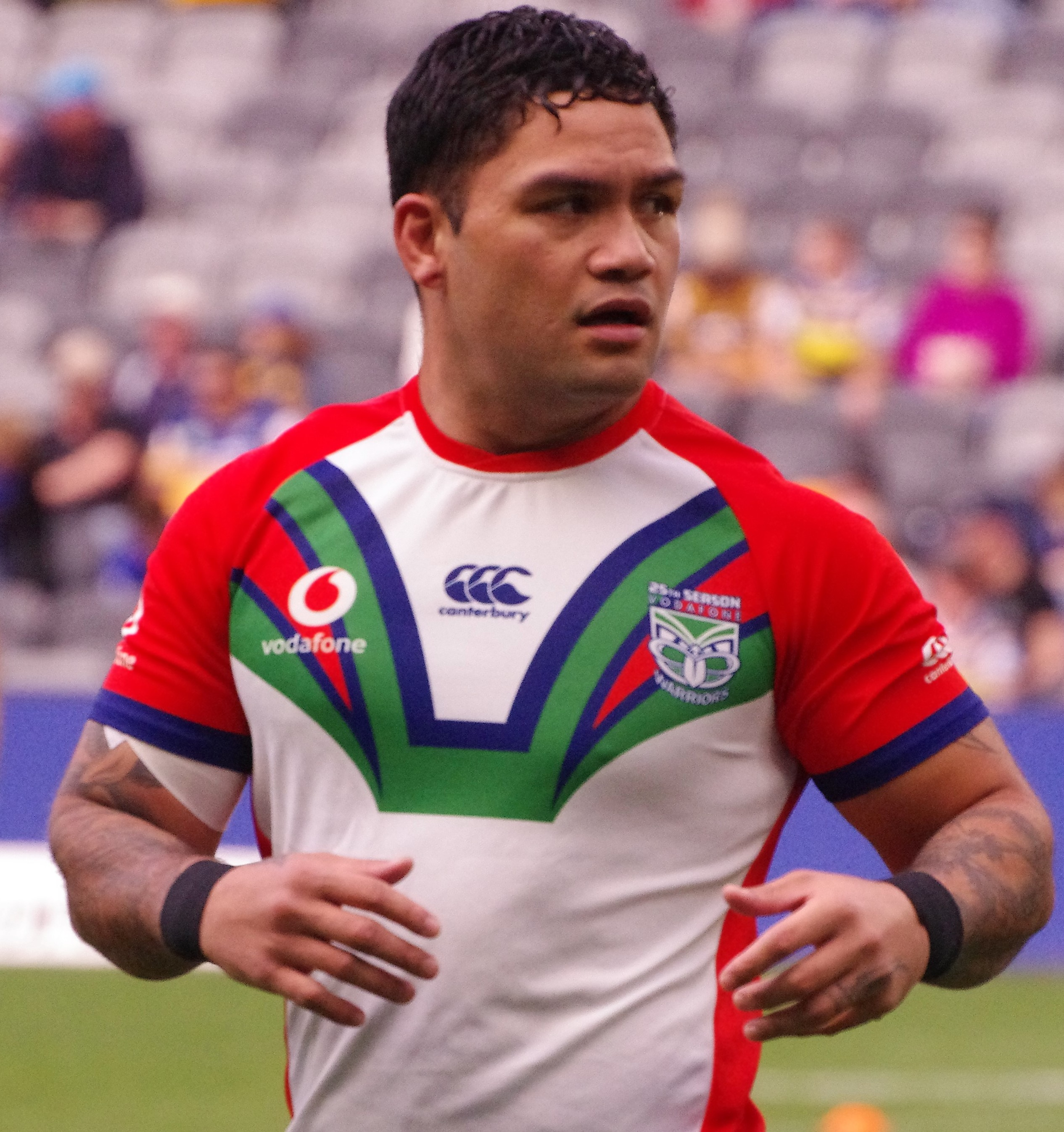

Personal information
- Born: 29 May 1987 (age 39) Hāwera, New Zealand
- Height: 175 cm (5 ft 9 in)
- Weight: 93 kg (14 st 9 lb)

Playing information
- Position: Hooker
Club
Years	Team	Pld	T	G	FG	P
2007–15	South Sydney	188	36	135	0	414
2016–19	New Zealand Warriors	83	14	69	0	194
2020	St George Illawarra	3	0	0	0	0
2020	Brisbane Broncos	12	0	1	0	2
	Total	286	50	205	0	610
Representative
Years	Team	Pld	T	G	FG	P
2008–17	New Zealand	43	5	22	0	64
2020–21	Māori All Stars	2	0	0	0	0
- Source: As of 6 May 2021

Issac Luke (born 29 May 1987) is a former New Zealand professional rugby league footballer.

He previously played for the South Sydney Rabbitohs, New Zealand Warriors, St. George Illawarra Dragons, and the Brisbane Broncos in the National Rugby League. Issac Luke was a part of the South Sydney squad that won the 2014 NRL Premiership. However, despite being named as starting hooker, was ruled out for the final due to suspension. Luke is a member of the World Cup-winning New Zealand team that beat Australia in the 2008 Final.

== Personal life ==
Luke was born in Hāwera, New Zealand, on 29 May 1987.

Luke's wife Mickayela is a cousin of fellow Kiwi rugby league international Sonny Bill Williams, with whom he also played in the juniors at the Bulldogs. Luke is a cousin of England international Rangi Chase. He is of Irish and Māori descent.

Luke's father, George Luke, died in 2023 after the car in which he was travelling between Rotorua and Hastings via the Kaweka Range was hit by a slip during Cyclone Gabrielle.

== Playing career ==
Prior to making his professional debut, Luke played Jersey Flegg Cup for Canterbury-Bankstown alongside fellow New Zealander and future Kiwis teammate Sonny Bill Williams. Luke made his NRL debut for the South Sydney Rabbitohs in round 12 of the 2007 NRL season against the Melbourne Storm at Olympic Park Stadium, coming off the bench. Luke had his first NRL start in round 19 Against the North Queensland Cowboys, playing at hooker. He scored his first NRL try and was awarded the Brut Man of the Match award for his efforts. Luke tasted finals football in his debut year, coming off the bench in South Sydney's 30 – 6 loss to the Manly-Warringah Sea Eagles. He was awarded the John Sattler Rookie of the Year at the South Sydney annual Red and Green Ball and presentation night held at the AJC function centre at Randwick Racecourse Sydney. He also was second only to Israel Folau in the Dally M Rookie of the Year award. His year was capped off by being named in the Train on Squad for the New Zealand national rugby league team.

Luke started the 2008 season well but a broken bone in his hand in the round 3 loss to the Penrith Panthers sidelined him for 4 weeks. He came back in round 7 against the Brisbane Broncos and added some much needed spark to the team but they came up short going down 32 – 18. His return from injury came just in time for him to make his test debut for the Kiwis for the ANZAC day test at the SCG. He started the game at hooker and had a solid debut. Luke was named at halfback for the round 8 clash against the North Queensland Cowboys to accommodate both himself and fellow hooker George Ndaira in the starting side. During round 13 against The Warriors, Luke was instrumental for Souths, including setting up a great try to put Souths ahead at half time, and was named Man of the Match. In round 14 against the Gold Coast Luke scored his first career double and slotted the match winning penalty for a 24–23 victory.

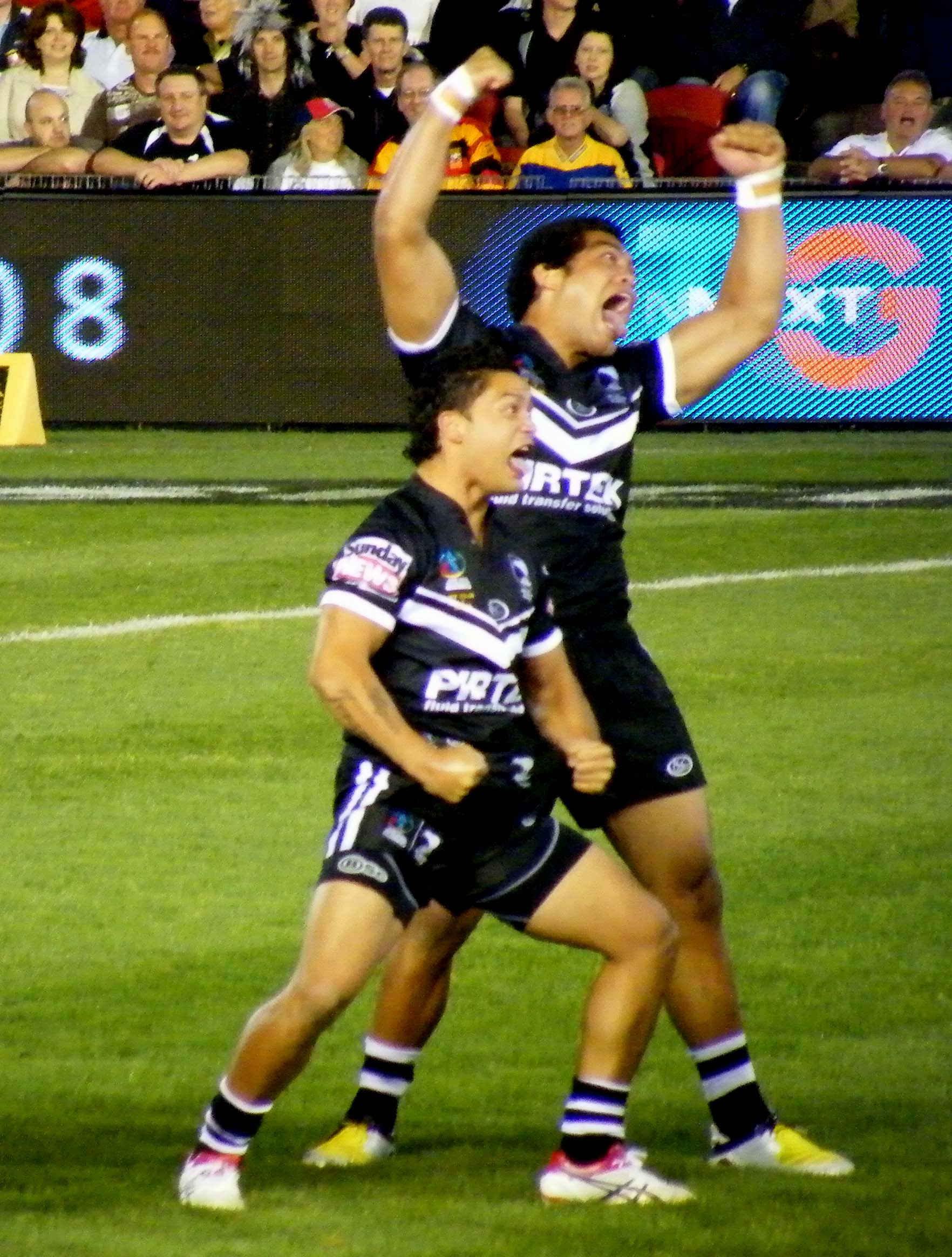
Issac Luke and Adam Blair performing the Haka for New Zealand.

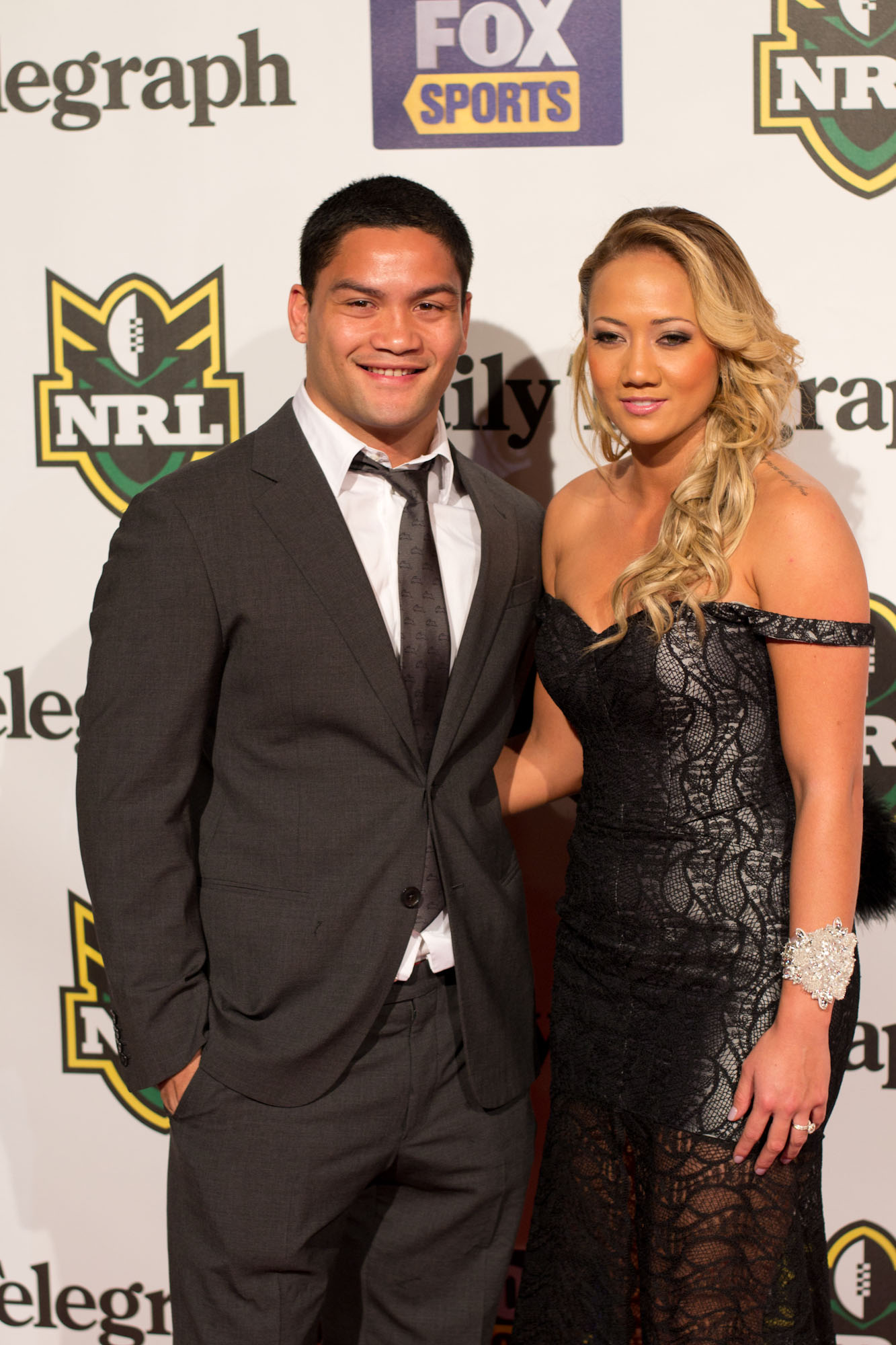
Luke at the 2012 Dally M Awards with Mikayla Watts

In August 2008, Luke was named in the New Zealand training squad for the 2008 Rugby League World Cup, and in October 2008, he was named in the final 24-man Kiwi squad.

Luke was considered one of the 2008 Rugby League World Cup tournament's 'Players to Watch' by the NRL Live blog. He was then a crucial part of the Kiwi side that lifted the World Cup in 2008, beating Australia 34 – 20 before over 50,000 spectators at Brisbane's Lang Park. Also in 2008, he was named in the Taranaki Rugby League Team of the Century.

Luke made 68 NRL appearances for Souths in the 2009, 2010 and 2011 seasons. In none of those seasons did Souths qualify for the finals series. He represented New Zealand in the 2009, 2010 and 2011 Four Nations tournaments, playing off the substitutes bench for the Kiwis' win of the 2010 edition. For the 2010 Anzac Test, Luke was selected to play for New Zealand at hooker in their loss against Australia. Luke's 2011 Four Nations tournament ended in controversy after he was criticised for a series of cynical tackles on opposing players. Luke admitted that in a match against England, he had attempted to break the leg of Rangi Chase, England's New Zealand-born half-back.

For the 2013 Anzac Test, Luke was selected to play for New Zealand at hooker in their loss again Australia.

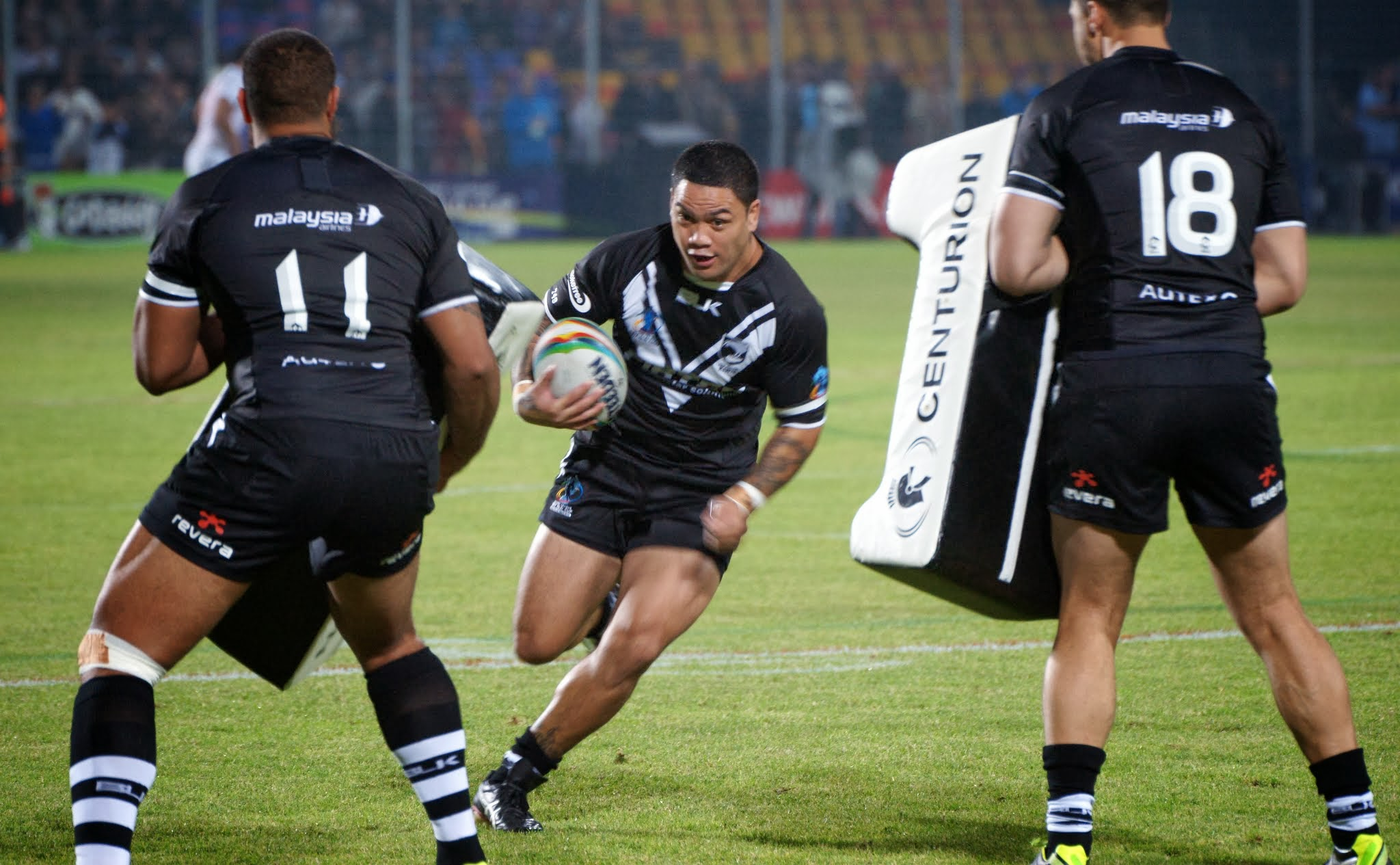
Luke warming up at the 2013 RLWC

In the 2014 NRL season, Luke made 18 appearances as Souths reached their first grand final in 43 years. Luke missed out on playing in the club's first premiership victory in 43 years as he was suspended from playing in the grand final after being found guilty of using a dangerous tackle on Sydney Roosters player Sonny Bill Williams in the preliminary final.

Luke was initially not allowed by the NRL to appear in the club's team photo for the grand final nor take to the field for the lap of honour but they reversed the decision for Luke on this occasion. Following the grand final victory, Souths head coach Michael Maguire handed his premiership ring to Luke.

In May 2015, Luke signed with the New Zealand Warriors for three seasons, beginning in 2016. He co-captained the New Zealand national rugby league team on their 2015 tour of Great Britain.

On 19 November 2019, it was announced that Luke had signed a one-year deal to join St. George Illawarra for the 2020 NRL season. Luke posted a message on his Twitter account saying "St George Dragons On way".

On 13 June 2020 Luke departed St. George for the Brisbane Broncos. Luke had played just three games with the club, failing to register a win with the team. There were suggestions that Luke left due to being frustrated with game time but Luke later spoke to the media saying "With support from the club and their understanding they were happy to release me to take an opportunity in Brisbane where my family and I were going to live after footy finished. This has nothing to do with what has been going on here and I advise youse all to wake yourselves up. "I'm doing this for my family.

Luke played 12 games for Brisbane in the 2020 NRL season after his mid-season switch from St. George as the Broncos finished with the wooden spoon for the first time in Brisbane's history.

Luke announced his retirement from the game on 22 September 2021.

=== Highlights ===
- Junior Club: Hawera Hawks
- Played for the Junior Kiwis
- First Grade Debut: Round 12, South Sydney Rabbitohs v Melbourne Storm at Olympic Park Stadium, 2 June 2007
- First NRL Try: Round 19, South Sydney Rabbitohs v North Queensland Cowboys at Telstra Stadium, 22 July 2007
- John Sattler Rookie of the Year award 2007
- International Test Debut: New Zealand Kiwis v Australian Kangaroos, 9 May 2008 at the Sydney Cricket Ground
- Played in New Zealand side that won the 2008 Rugby League World Cup
- Won the 2008 NZRL international rookie of the year award
- George Piggins Medal (Souths' Best and Fairest Award) 2010
- Played in New Zealand side that won the 2010 Rugby League Four Nations

== Post playing ==
On 6 March 2022, Luke was inducted as a life member of the South Sydney Rabbitohs. In 2023, Luke became a part of the Marsden High School Open Rugby League coaching staff.

== Statistics ==
Year	Team	Games	Tries	Goals	Pts
2007	South Sydney Rabbitohs	14	2	2	12
2008	South Sydney Rabbitohs	20	6	42	108
2009	South Sydney Rabbitohs	24	4	15	46
2010	South Sydney Rabbitohs	20	9	46	128
2011	South Sydney Rabbitohs	24	3	2	16
2012	South Sydney Rabbitohs	22	5	3	26
2013	South Sydney Rabbitohs	26	4	1	18
2014	South Sydney Rabbitohs	18		5	10
2015	South Sydney Rabbitohs	20	3	19	50
2016	New Zealand Warriors	20	3	28	68
2017	New Zealand Warriors	23	1	17	38
2018	New Zealand Warriors	23	6	1	26
2019	New Zealand Warriors	17	4	23	62
2020	St. George Illawarra Dragons	3			
2020	Brisbane Broncos	12		1	2
	Totals	286	50	205	610
