= Mason Lino =

Samoa international rugby league footballer

Mason "Mase" Lino
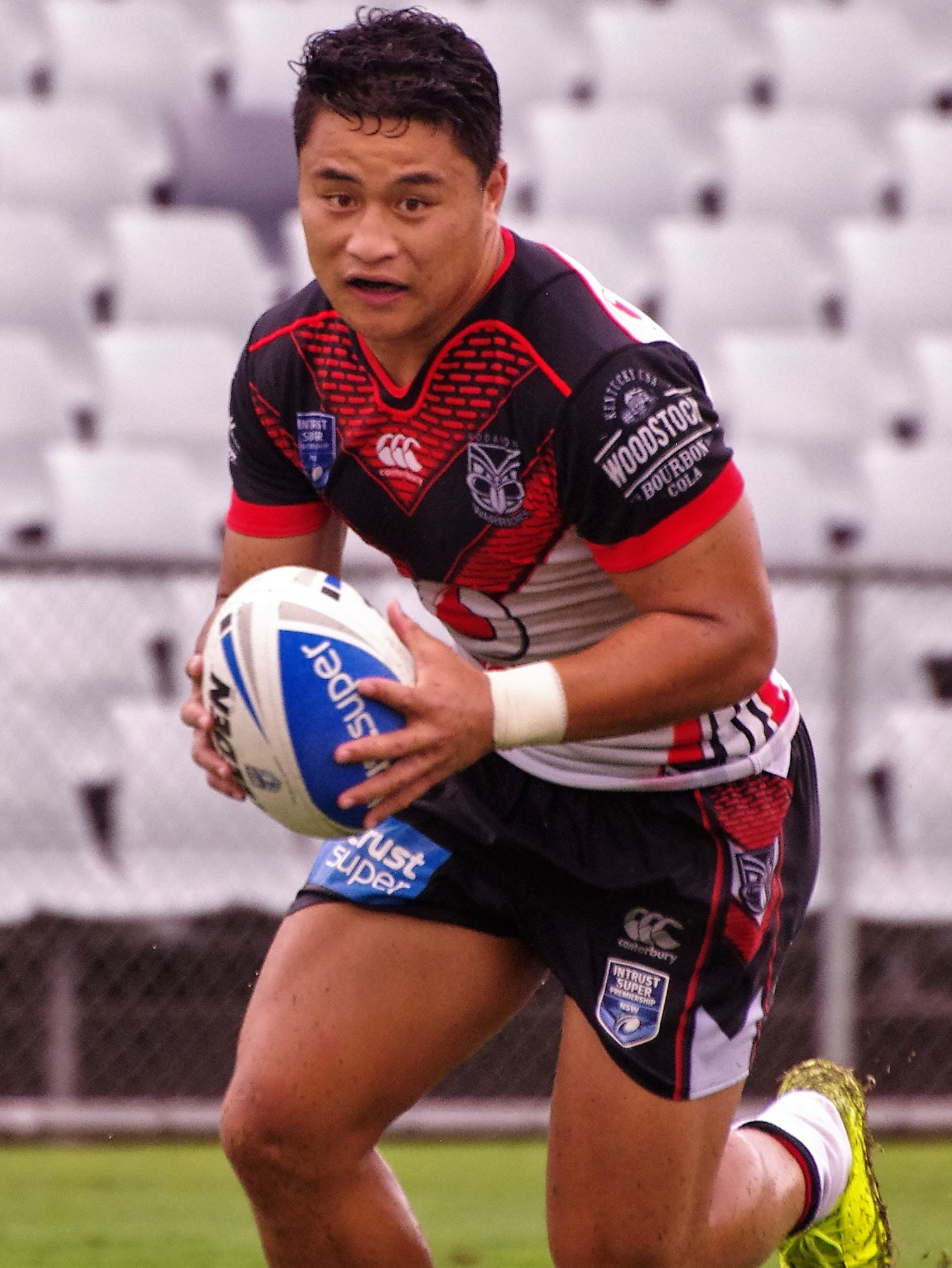

Personal information
- Full name: Mason Gustav Lino
- Born: 4 February 1994 (age 32) Apia, Samoa
- Height: 5 ft 9 in (1.75 m)
- Weight: 13 st 5 lb (85 kg)

Playing information
- Position: Scrum-half, Stand-off
Club
Years	Team	Pld	T	G	FG	P
2015–18	New Zealand Warriors	17	3	16	0	44
2019–20	Newcastle Knights	17	2	48	0	104
2021–26	Wakefield Trinity	131	20	204	6	494
2027–	Castleford Tigers	0	0	0	0	0
	Total	165	25	268	6	642
Representative
Years	Team	Pld	T	G	FG	P
2016–19	Samoa	3	0	3	0	6
- Source: As of 20 November 2026

Mason Lino (born 4 February 1994) is a Samoan professional rugby league footballer who plays as a scrum-half and stand-off for Castleford Tigers in the Super League and Samoa at the international level.

He previously played for the New Zealand Warriors and the Newcastle Knights in the NRL. He signed for Castleford Tigers for the 2027 season

== Background ==
Lino was born in Apia, Samoa.

== Early years ==
Lino was a Marist Saints junior and attended Avondale College.

Lino is of Samoan and Chinese descent.

== Playing career ==
=== 2012 ===
Lino trialled for the New Zealand Warriors' NYC squad in 2012, earning a place in the squad. He finished the season as the team's top points-scorer with 144 points in 23 games. He attended an NRL rookie camp on the 24 and 25 November 2012.

=== 2013 ===
Lino scored 147 points for the Junior Warriors in 2013, taking his total to 281 from 41 appearances. The side lost the 2013 Holden Cup Grand Final 30–42. He also played for the Junior Kiwis in their 26–38 defeat by the Junior Kangaroos on 13 October 2013.

He was named in the Samoan train-on squad for the 2013 Rugby League World Cup. He did not make the squad after the cut to 25 players.

=== 2014 ===
In 2014, he co-captained the Junior Warriors Holden Cup team in their 34–32 grand final victory over the Brisbane Broncos, kicking five conversions out of six and finishing the match on the pitch despite suffering a partial shoulder dislocation. He finished his Holden Cup career with 503 points from 62 appearances, becoming the third most-capped Junior Warrior behind Ben Henry and John Palavi.

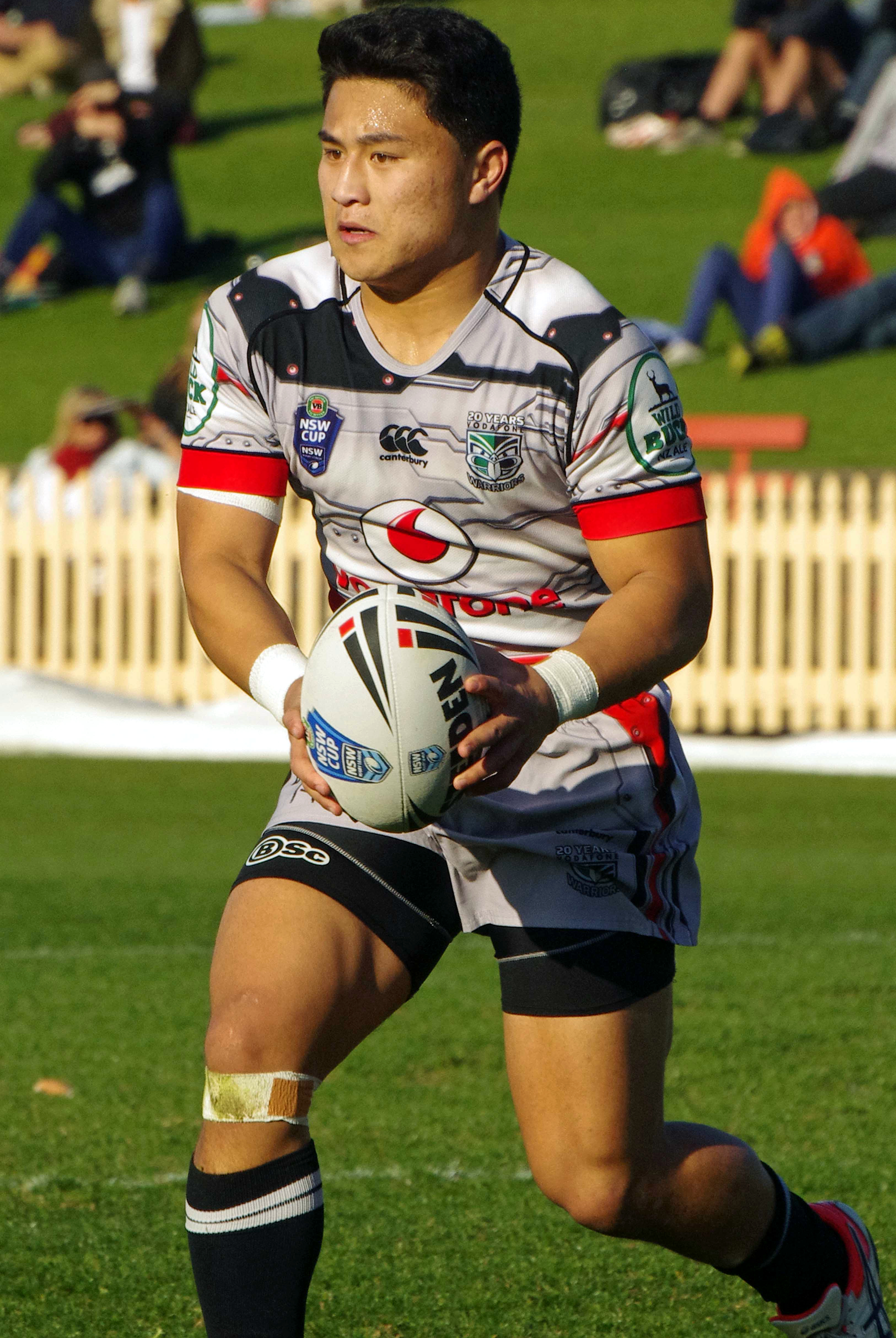
Lino playing for the Warriors in 2015

=== 2015 ===
Lino had signed with AS Carcassonne for the 2015 season, but the contract was cancelled after his shoulder dislocation in the 2014 Holden Cup grand final. Instead, Lino re-signed with the Warriors, for 2015, to play in their New South Wales Cup squad.

He made his NRL debut on 22 August 2015 against the North Queensland Cowboys, replacing an injured Chad Townsend.

=== 2016 ===
On 8 October, Lino made his international debut for Samoa in their test match against Fiji in Apia.

=== 2017 ===
Lino played for the Warriors in the 2017 NRL Auckland Nines.

In June, Lino signed a further two-year contract, committing both parties until the end of the 2019 season.

On 28 August 2017, Lino was named in The 2017 Intrust Super Premiership NSW team of the year.

=== 2018 ===
Lino played in 8 NRL games for the Warriors in the 2018 season. In September, he signed a 2-year contract with the Newcastle Knights starting in 2019.

=== 2019 ===
In Lino's first season for the Knights, he debuted in round 4 against the St. George Illawarra Dragons. He played 12 games for the Knights, scored two tries and kicked 33 goals.

=== 2020 ===
In 2020, Lino only managed to play in five games for Newcastle before being released at the end of the season.

In November, he signed a three-year contract with Super League side Wakefield Trinity starting in 2021.

=== 2021 ===
Lino played 24 games for Wakefield Trinity in the 2021 Super League season as the club finished 10th on the table.

=== 2022 ===
Lino played 24 games for Wakefield Trinity in the 2022 Super League season which saw the club narrowly avoid relegation as they finished 10th.

=== 2023 ===
Lino played 22 games for Wakefield Trinity in the Super League XXVIII season as the club finished bottom of the table and were relegated to the RFL Championship which ended their 24-year stay in the top flight.

=== 2024 ===
Lino played 19 games for Wakefield in the 2024 RFL Championship season as the club won all three trophies which were the 1895 Cup, the league leaders shield and RFL Championship grand final.

=== 2025 ===
In round 20 Lino kicked the match winning drop goal and provided two vital try assists to guide Wakefield Trinity against Leeds, In a 15-14 win. Lino played 27 games for Wakefield Trinity in the 2025 Super League season including their elimination play off loss against Leigh.

=== 2026 ===
On 8 September 2026 it was reported that he had signed for Castleford on a two-year deal.

On 3 October 2026, Lino played in the 23-10 Super League Grand Final victory over Warrington.

=== Wakefield Trinity ===
- RFL 1895 Cup: 2024
- RFL Championship Leaders' Shield: 2024
- RFL Championship Second Division: 2024
- Super League: 2026

== Statistics ==
Year	Team	Games	Tries	Goals	FGs	Pts
2015	New Zealand Warriors	3				
2017	New Zealand Warriors	6		2		4
2018	New Zealand Warriors	8	3	14		40
2019	Newcastle Knights	12	2	33		74
2020	Newcastle Knights	5		15		30
2021	Wakefield Trinity	24	6	76	1	177
2022	Wakefield Trinity	24	2	47		102
2023	Wakefield Trinity	23		12	1	25
2024	Wakefield Trinity	19	6	23		70
2025	Wakefield Trinity	30	5	33	2	88
2026	Wakefield Trinity	14	1	13	2	32
2027	Castleford Tigers					
	Totals	165	25	268	6	642
