= Andrew McFadden =

Australian RL coach and former rugby league footballer

Personal information
- Born: 20 January 1978 (age 48) Canberra, Australian Capital Territory, Australia

Playing information
- Position: Halfback, Hooker
Club
Years	Team	Pld	T	G	FG	P
1997–01	Canberra Raiders	76	28	1	1	115
2002	Parramatta Eels	21	4	0	0	16
2003–04	Melbourne Storm	3	0	0	0	0
	Total	100	32	1	1	131

Coaching information
Club
Years	Team	Gms	W	D	L	W%
2014–16	New Zealand Warriors	62	28	0	34	45
2022	Canberra Raiders	1	1	0	0	100
	Total	63	29	0	34	46

Andrew McFadden (born 20 January 1978) is an Australian professional rugby league football coach and former player. He currently works as the development and pathways manager at the New Zealand Warriors in the NRL.

== Early life ==
Born in Canberra, Australia, McFadden was educated at Hawker College, Canberra, where he represented 1995 Australian Schoolboys.

== Playing career ==
McFadden played for the Canberra Raiders from 1997 to 2001, where he formed the "Mac-Attack" with Mark McLinden. He then played for the Parramatta Eels in 2002 and finally the Melbourne Storm from 2003 to 2004 before retiring.

== Coaching career ==
McFadden returned to the Canberra Raiders in 2005, becoming their Jersey Flegg coach before leading the NSWRL Premier League team in 2006.

He spent 2007 and 2008 as the assistant coach of the Catalans Dragons. In 2009 he returned to the Raiders, coaching the Toyota Cup (Under-20s) team. He was then promoted to assistant coach at the Raiders for three years.

In November 2012 he was appointed assistant coach for the New Zealand Warriors under head coach Matthew Elliott.

On 7 April 2014 McFadden was appointed acting head coach of the New Zealand Warriors until the end of the 2014 NRL season, following the departure of Matthew Elliott.

On 13 May 2014, after four games as acting head coach, the New Zealand Warriors under chief executive Wayne Scurrah contracted McFadden as head coach until the end of the 2017 NRL season.

On 12 September 2016, it was announced that McFadden had been replaced as head coach by Stephen Kearney. McFadden remained with the club and accepted an assistant coach position, which he carried through for 2017 and 2018.

He re-joined the Canberra Raiders as assistant coach for the 2019 NRL season.
