= John Palavi =

New Zealand rugby league footballer

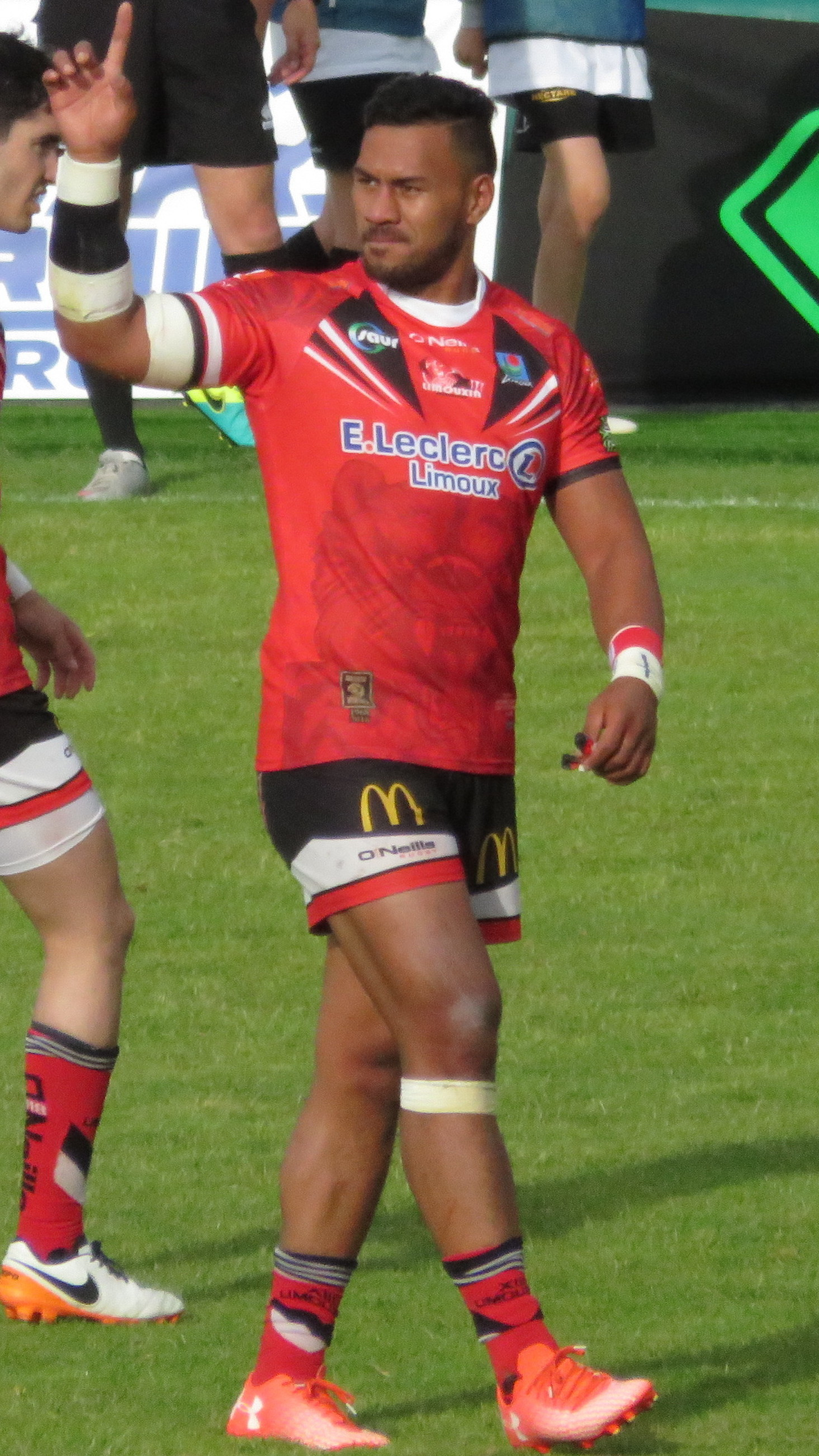

Personal information
- Born: 31 July 1992 (age 34) Auckland, New Zealand
- Height: 189 cm (6 ft 2 in)
- Weight: 100 kg (15 st 10 lb)

Playing information
- Position: Lock, Second-row
Club
Years	Team	Pld	T	G	FG	P
2014–16	New Zealand Warriors	5	0	0	0	0
2017–18	Limoux Grizzlies	16	8	0	0	32
	Total	21	8	0	0	32
- Source: As of 10 February 2018

John Palavi is a New Zealand professional rugby league footballer who last played for the Burleigh Bears in the Queensland Cup.

He previously played for the New Zealand Warriors in the NRL and the Limoux Grizzlies in the Elite One Championship.

== Background ==
Palavi is of Tongan descent, attended St Paul's College and played for the Richmond Rovers and Point Chevalier Pirates.

== Playing career ==
He was then signed by the New Zealand Warriors and played in the National Youth Competition between 2010 and 2012. In 2011 he was part of the Junior Warriors side who won the grand final. That year he was named the club's NYC Player of the Year and also was named in the Junior Kiwis side.

In 2013 he played for the Auckland Vulcans in the New South Wales Cup and was named the Vulcan's Rookie of the Year.

He made the New Zealand Warriors first grade squad in 2014 and made his National Rugby League debut in round one.

In 2015 he became captain for the New Zealand Warriors New South Wales Cup side. On 27 September, he was named on the interchange bench in the 2015 New South Wales Cup Team of the Year.

He was released by the New Zealand Warriors at the end of the 2016 season and joined the Limoux Grizzlies in the Elite One Championship.

Palavi signed with the Tweed Heads Seagulls for the 2019 season, and was on a train and trial contract with the Gold Coast Titans. In 2021, Palavi joined Burleigh in the Queensland Cup.
