= Sam Lisone =

Samoa international rugby league footballer

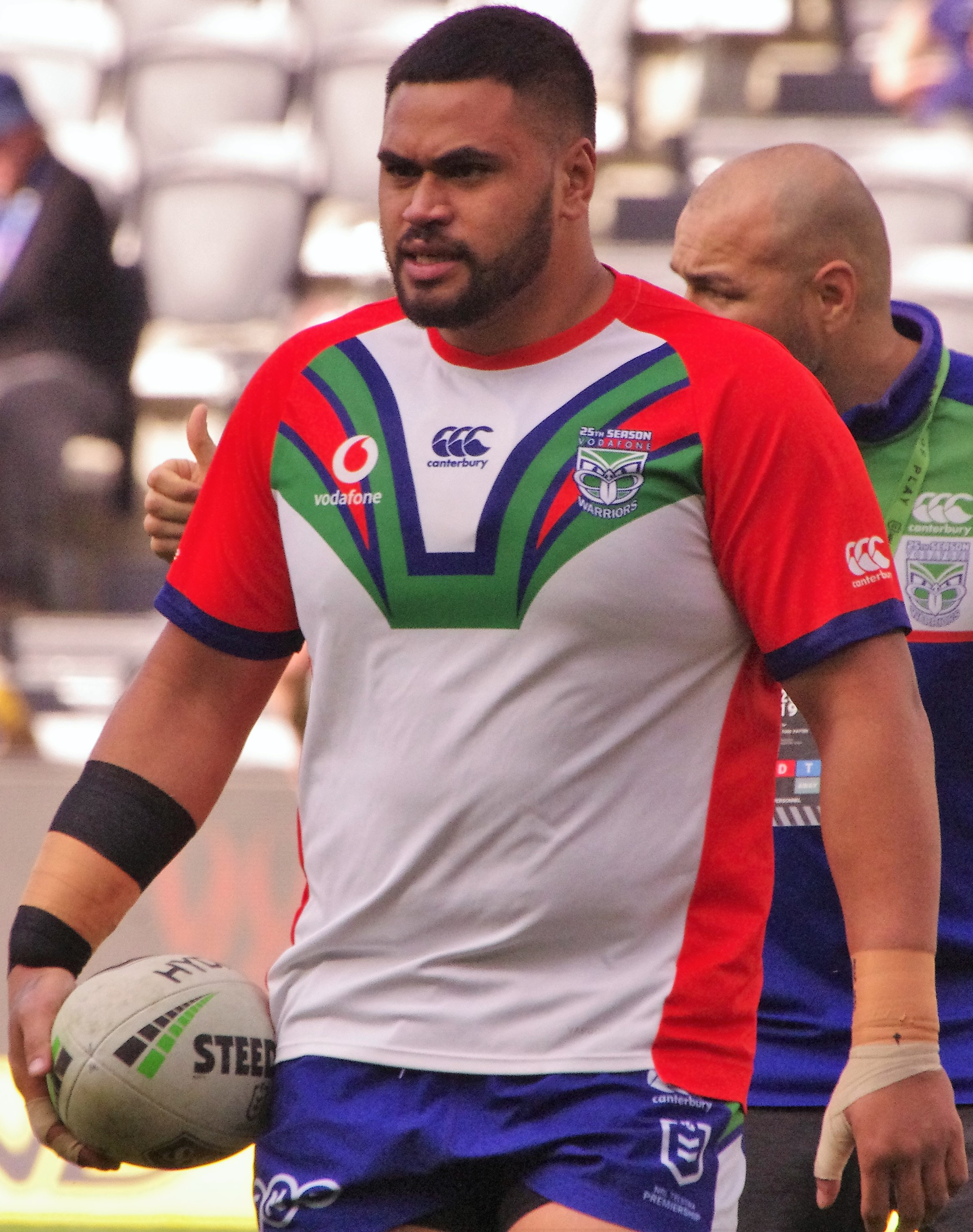

Personal information
- Full name: Samuel Lisone
- Born: 19 February 1994 (age 32) Auckland, New Zealand
- Height: 6 ft 0 in (1.84 m)
- Weight: 17 st 2 lb (109 kg)

Playing information
- Position: Prop
Club
Years	Team	Pld	T	G	FG	P
2015–19	New Zealand Warriors	85	3	0	0	12
2020–22	Gold Coast Titans	48	2	0	0	8
2023–25	Leeds Rhinos	78	15	0	0	60
2026–	Hull FC	14	1	0	0	0
	Total	225	21	0	0	80
Representative
Years	Team	Pld	T	G	FG	P
2015–17	Samoa	4	0	0	0	0
2017	NRL All Stars	1	0	0	0	0
- Source: As of 31 October 2025

Sam Lisone (born 19 February 1994), also known by the nickname of "Slammin", is a Samoa international rugby league footballer who plays as a prop for Hull FC in the Betfred Super League

He previously played for the New Zealand Warriors and the Gold Coast Titans in the National Rugby League and the Leeds Rhinos in the Super League. Lisone has also played for the NRL All Stars at representative level.

== Early life ==
Lisone was born in Auckland, New Zealand, and is of Samoan and New Zealand descent and attended Tangaroa College.

He played his junior rugby league for Otahuhu Leopards. He attended the National Secondary Schools competition in 2011 and was named in the tournament team.

== Playing career ==
Lisone was signed by the New Zealand Warriors in 2012 and played in the Warriors NYC team in 2013 and 2014. He attended an NRL rookie camp on 24 and 25 November 2012. He played in the 2013 Holden Cup Grand Final, which the club lost 30-42 to the Penrith Panthers juniors.

In 2014, Lisone also played in the New South Wales Cup for the Warriors and was 18th man for the first grade side on several occasions. He co-captained the Junior Warriors in the 2014 Holden Cup grand final, scoring a try in a 34-32 victory over the Brisbane Broncos juniors. He was named at prop in the Holden Cup team of the year and also won the Warriors NYC Player of the Year and NYC Players’ Player of the Year awards. Lisone finished the year co-captaining the Junior Kiwis in a 15-14 victory over the Junior Kangaroos on 18 October. Lisone joined the New Zealand Warriors first grade squad for 2015, and was part of the squad for the 2015 NRL Auckland Nines.

Lisone made his first grade debut on 7 March 2015 against the Newcastle Knights. He made 19 appearances for the Warriors in 2015, while mid-season his contract was extended until the end of 2018. On 2 May 2015, Lisone played for Samoa against Tonga in the 2015 Polynesian Cup. On 2 May 2016, it was reported five players were stood down from an international test match for mixing prescription drugs with energy drinks on a night out. The recipe of which can emulate the effect of illicit drugs. Lisone was one of the players named who received a fine and was stood down. On 8 October 2016, Lisone played for Samoa in their historical test match against Fiji in Apia.Lisone played 16 games for the Gold Coast in the 2021 NRL season including the club's elimination final loss against the Sydney Roosters. Lisone played a total of 14 games for the Gold Coast in the 2022 NRL season as the club finished 13th on the table. Lisone played 23 games for Leeds in the 2023 Super League season as the club finished 8th on the table and missed the playoffs. Lisone played 23 games for Leeds in the 2024 Super League which saw the club finish 8th on the table. Lisone played 28 games for Leeds in the 2025 Super League season including their elimination playoff loss against St Helens.

== Statistics ==
Year	Team	Games	Tries	Pts
2015	Warriors	19		
2016	Warriors	21		
2017	Warriors	23		
2018	Warriors	11	1	4
2019	Warriors	11	2	8
2020	Gold Coast Titans	18	1	4
2021	Gold Coast Titans	16		
2022	Gold Coast Titans	14	1	4
2023	Leeds Rhinos	24	4	16
2024	Leeds Rhinos	24	2	8
2025	Leeds Rhinos	15	6	24
2026	Hull FC			
	Totals	196	17	44
