= Solomone Kata =

New Zealand and Tonga dual-code international rugby footballer

Solo Kata
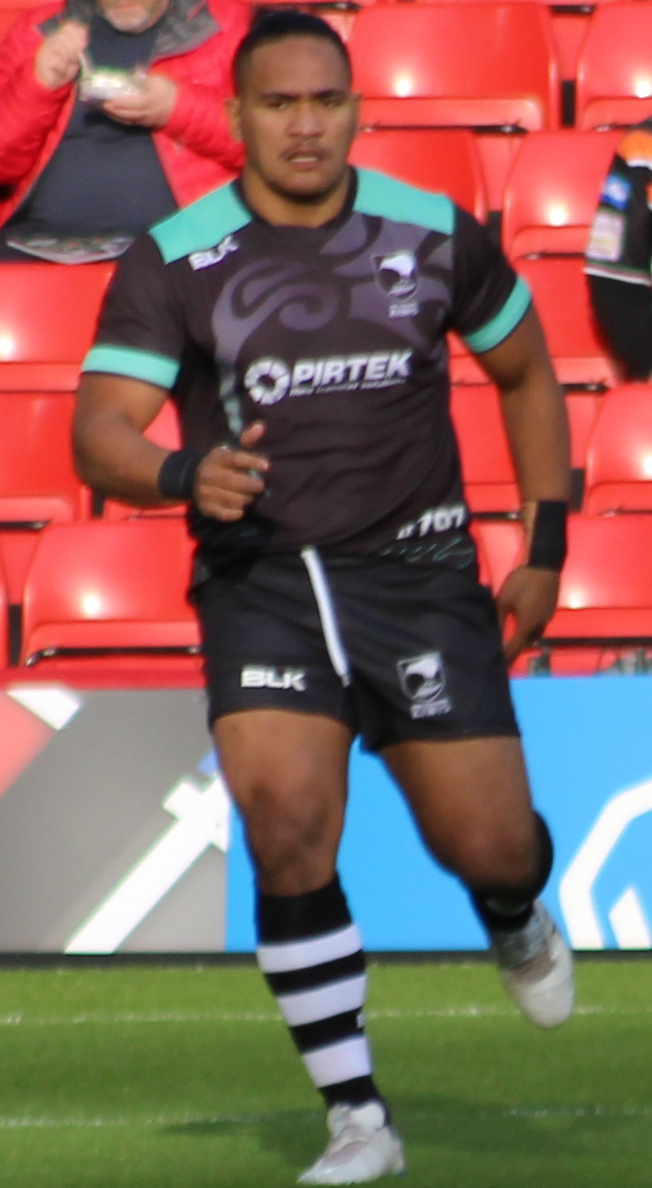

Personal information
- Full name: Solomone Kata
- Born: 3 December 1994 (age 31) Neiafu, Tonga
- Height: 1.77 m (5 ft 10 in)
- Weight: 104 kg (16 st 5 lb)

Playing information

Rugby league
- Position: Centre
Club
Years	Team	Pld	T	G	FG	P
2015–19	New Zealand Warriors	93	46	0	0	184
Representative
Years	Team	Pld	T	G	FG	P
2014–19	Tonga	7	4	8	0	32
2016	New Zealand	5	1	0	0	4

Rugby union
- Position: Wing, Centre
Club
Years	Team	Pld	T	G	FG	P
2020–2021	Brumbies	18	5	0	0	25
2021	Auckland	2	0	0	0	0
2022	Moana Pasifika	7	1	0	0	5
2022–2023	Exeter Chiefs	20	5	0	0	25
2023–	Leicester Tigers	62	14	0	0	70
	Total	109	25	0	0	125
Representative
Years	Team	Pld	T	G	FG	P
2021–	Tonga	13	4	0	0	20
- Source: As of 1 November 2026

Solomone Kata (born 3 December 1994) is a professional dual-code rugby footballer who plays as a centre for Premiership Rugby club Leicester Tigers and the Tonga national team.

Prior to rugby union, Kata played rugby league for the New Zealand Warriors and was contracted to the Melbourne Storm in the NRL, and also played for Tonga and New Zealand at the international level.

== Early life ==
Kata was born in Neiafu, Tonga, and moved to New Zealand in 2011 on a rugby union scholarship at Sacred Heart College, Auckland.

Kata represented the Tongan under-21 side.

== Club career ==
Kata switched to rugby league in 2013, signing with the New Zealand Warriors. Kata played for the Warriors Holden Cup team and was part of the side that lost the Grand Final 30–42 to the Penrith Panthers. Kata played in the 2014 Auckland Nines with the first grade side, before returning to the under 20s competition.

Kata played for the Warriors in the inaugural NRL Auckland Nines At the end of the regular season, Kata played at centre in the 2014 Holden Cup grand final, scoring a hat-trick in the Junior Warriors' 34–32 victory over the Brisbane Broncos juniors. Kata won the Jack Gibson Medal as the grand final player of the match.

Kata again played in the Warriors NRL Auckland Nines team in 2015 and was named in the team of the tournament. In Round 1 of the 2015 NRL season, Kata made his first grade NRL debut for the New Zealand Warriors against the Newcastle Knights on the wing in the Warriors' 14–24 loss at Hunter Stadium. In Round 2, against the Canberra Raiders, Kata scored his first NRL career try in the Warriors' 18–6 win at Canberra Stadium. Kata finished his debut year in the NRL with him playing in all of the Warriors 24 matches and being the top tryscorer with 12 tries in the 2015 NRL season, while mid-year his contract was extended until the end of 2018.

In February, Kata played for the Warriors in the 2016 NRL Auckland Nines. On 7 May, he played for Tonga against Samoa in the 2016 Polynesian Cup, where he played at centre and kicked 1 goal.

In June 2017, Kata's older brother Tevita died in Tonga and Kata took a 3-week break from the game to return home to mourn with his family. Kata returned in Round 19 against the Penrith Panthers, scoring 2 tries, dedicated to his brother in the 34–22 loss at Mt Smart Stadium. Kata finished the 2017 NRL season with him playing in 19 matches and scoring 5 tries for the Warriors.

Kata made 23 appearances for the Warriors in 2018, as the club returned to the finals for the first time since 2011, scoring 12 tries in total.

Kata was switched by the Warriors from left centre to right centre from the beginning of the season. After playing 6 matches and scoring 2 tries, with his form falling away he was dropped to their reserve team in the New South Wales Canterbury Cup. On 24 June it was announced that he had been granted an immediate release and had signed a contract with the Melbourne Storm until the end of the 2020 season.

Kata returned to Rugby Union and begun playing for the Brumbies. In August 2022, Kata signed for Premiership Rugby side Exeter Chiefs. The following year he announced his signing with the Leicester Tigers in England's Premiership Rugby.

== International career ==
On 20 October 2014, Kata made his international debut, playing for Tonga in their end-of-year test-match against Papua New Guinea. On 2 May 2015, Kata played for Tonga against Samoa in the Polynesian Cup, playing at centre and kicking 2 goals in Tonga's 16–18 loss at Cbus Super Stadium. On 8 September 2015, Kata was named in the New Zealand Kiwis' training squad. After not making the final New Zealand squad for the England tour, Kata played for Tonga in their Asia-Pacific Qualifier match against the Cook Islands for the 2017 Rugby League World Cup. He played at fullback, scored a try and kicked 4 goals in Tonga's 28–8 win at Campbelltown Stadium.

He made his New Zealand debut and played in the Four Nations for his adopted country. On 5 November, in the Kiwis second test against Australia, Kata scored his first try for the Kiwis in the 14–8 win at Ricoh Arena in Coventry. On 20 November, Kata played in the Kiwis 2016 Four nations Final match against Australia, playing at centre in the 34–8 loss at Anfield. Kata played in all 5 matches and scored 1 try in the tournament.

On 4 October 2017, Kata was selected in the 24-man squad for Tonga for the 2017 Rugby League World Cup. Kata only played in 1 match for Tonga which was against Samoa, Kata played at centre but broke his foot during the 32–18 victory over their pacific rivals at Waikato Stadium. He scored a try in the historic first-ever Test match between Tonga and the Australian Kangaroos on 20 October 2018, played in front of a sold-out crowd at Mount Smart Stadium, Auckland.

He made his test debut for Tonga in rugby union on 6 November 2021 in a 69–13 loss to England as part of the Autumn Nations Series.
