= Charlie Gubb =

New Zealand rugby league footballer

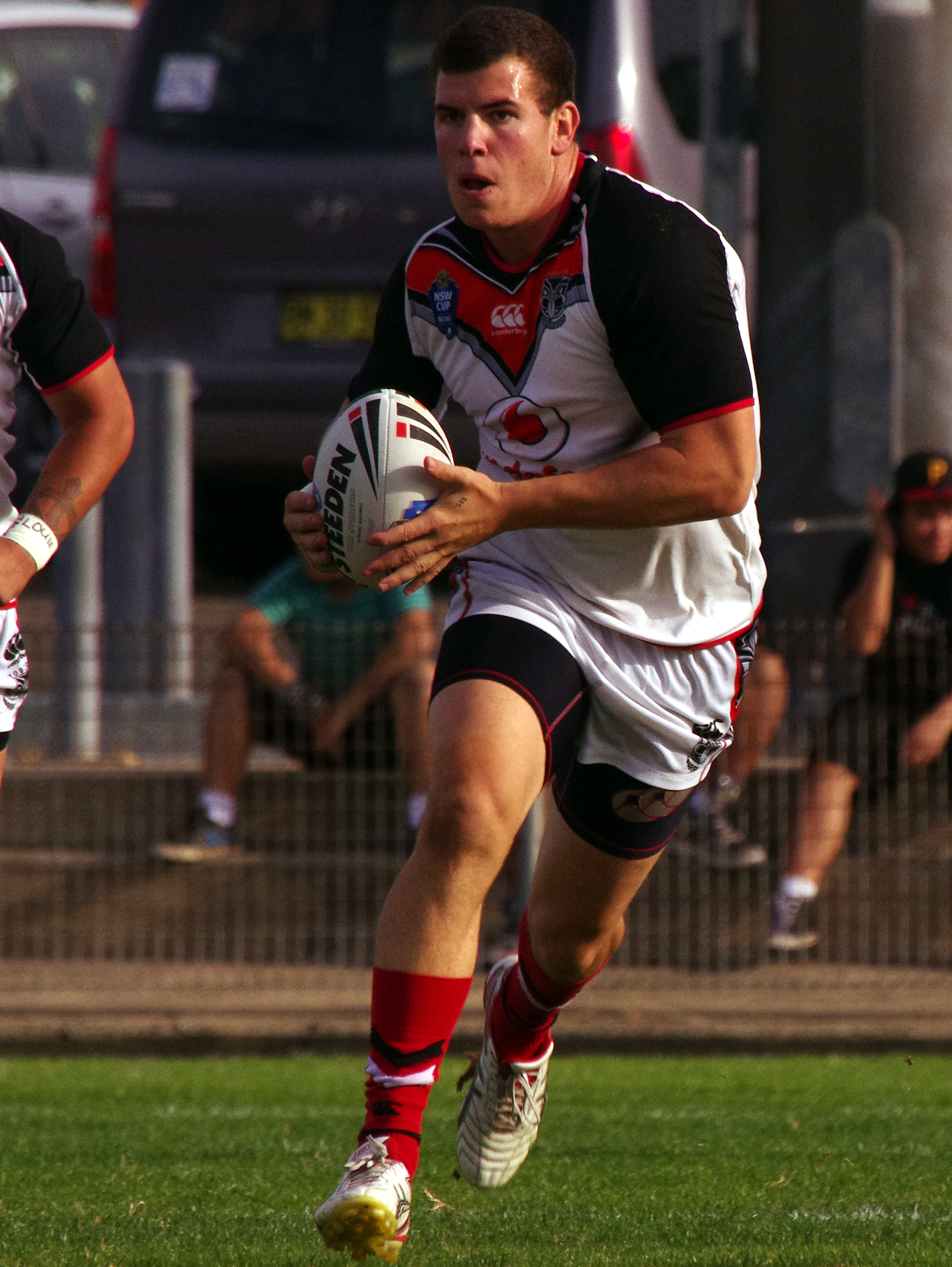

Personal information
- Born: 17 May 1990 (age 36) Wellington, New Zealand

Playing information
- Height: 188 cm (6 ft 2 in)
- Weight: 108 kg (17 st 0 lb)
- Position: Prop
Club
Years	Team	Pld	T	G	FG	P
2013–17	New Zealand Warriors	39	1	0	0	4
2018	Canberra Raiders	5	0	0	0	0
2018	Widnes Vikings	4	0	0	0	0
	Total	48	1	0	0	4
Representative
Years	Team	Pld	T	G	FG	P
2012	Queensland Residents	1	0	0	0	0

Charlie Gubb is a New Zealand former professional rugby league footballer who last played for the Widnes Vikings in the Super League.

== Early years ==
Gubb, of Māori descent, attended Wellington College and played for their first XV rugby union team before switching to rugby league in 2008, playing for the University Hunters club in the Wellington Rugby League competition. He signed with the New Zealand Warriors in 2010, turning down offers from the Manly Warringah Sea Eagles and the Wests Tigers.

== Playing career ==
After signing with the New Zealand Warriors, Gubb played for their Toyota Cup (Under-20s) team in 2010. He played in 23 games during the season and came off the bench in the 2010 Toyota Cup Grand Final, which was won by the Warriors 42–28.

Following the 2010 season, Gubb moved to Australia and joined the Wynnum Manly Seagulls in the Queensland Cup. He was part of the Seagulls team that won the 2011 Queensland Cup grand final 16–10. In 2012, he was selected to play for the Queensland Residents team.

Gubb returned to Auckland in 2013 and trialled with the Warriors on a pre-season contract. Gubb earned a full-time contract with the club and spent the first half of the year playing NSW Cup with the Auckland Vulcans. His contract was extended until the end of 2014 in June and, after several games as 18th man, Gubb was named to make his first grade debut for the Warriors on 7 July 2013 after Russell Packer withdrew due to injury.

In 2018, Gubb joined the Canberra Raiders but halfway through the season signed with English club Leigh Centurions. On July 27, 2018, Gubb's move to Leigh fell through due to financial reasons, Gubb then signed a contract to join the Widnes Vikings instead.

On 4 March 2019, Gubb announced his retirement from Rugby League at the age of 28 to pursue a career as a teacher back in his home country of New Zealand.
