= Ken Maumalo =

NZ & Samoa international rugby league footballer

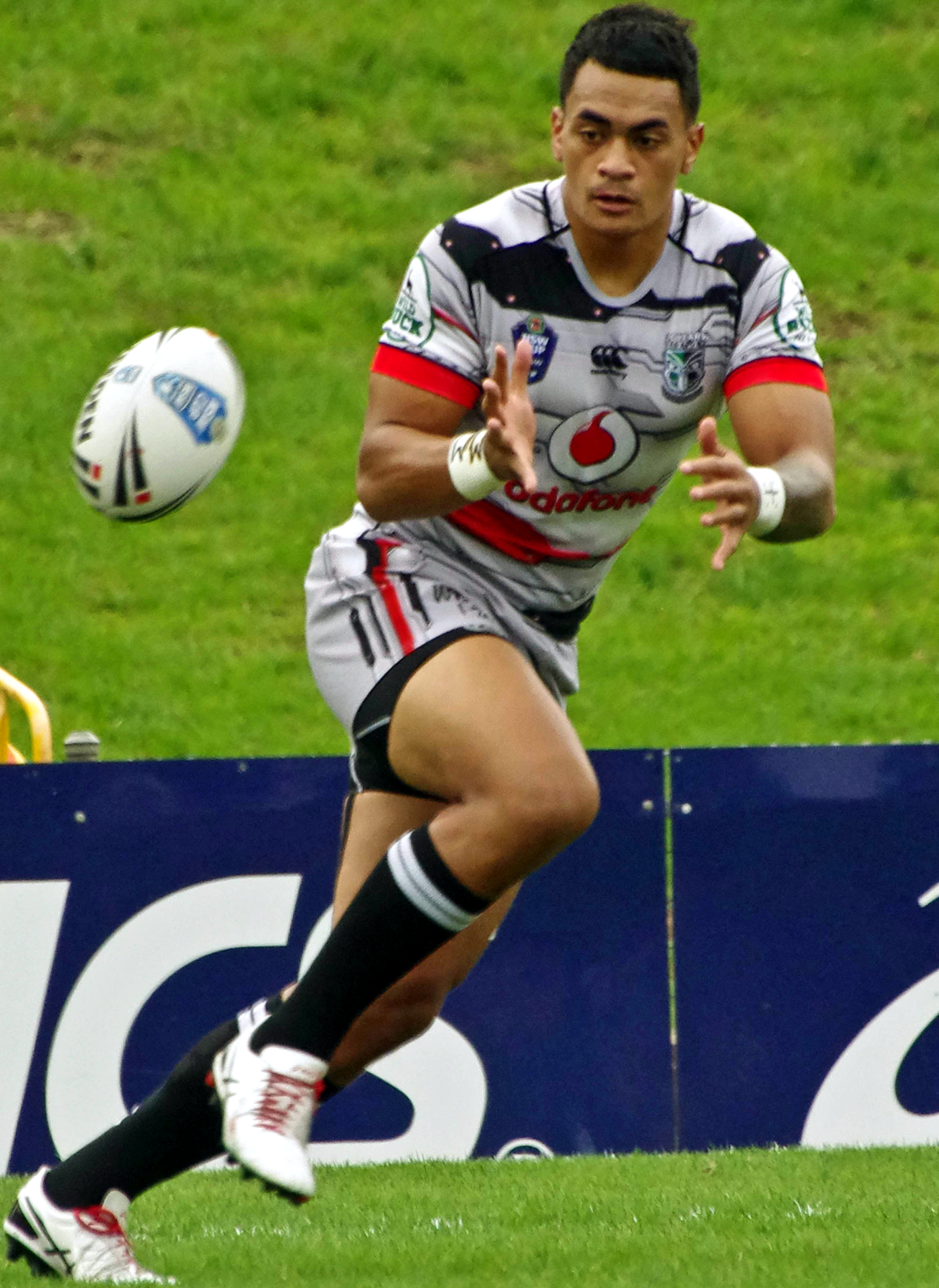

Personal information
- Born: 16 July 1994 (age 32) Auckland, New Zealand
- Height: 191 cm (6 ft 3 in)
- Weight: 114 kg (17 st 13 lb)

Playing information
- Position: Wing, Centre
Club
Years	Team	Pld	T	G	FG	P
2015–21	New Zealand Warriors	106	44	0	0	176
2021–23	Wests Tigers	29	19	0	0	76
	Total	135	63	0	0	252
Representative
Years	Team	Pld	T	G	FG	P
2016	NSW Residents	1	3	0	0	12
2016–17	Samoa	4	3	0	0	12
2018–22	New Zealand	9	5	0	0	20
- Source: As of 6 November 2026
- Relatives: Nelson Asofa-Solomona (cousin)

Ken Maumalo (born 16 July 1994) is a New Zealand former rugby league footballer who plays as a winger for the Ipswich Jets in the Queensland Cup. He previously played for the New Zealand Warriors and Wests Tigers in the National Rugby League (NRL) and represented Samoa and New Zealand at international level. He was named Dally M Winger of the Year in 2019.

== Background ==
Maumalo was born in Auckland, New Zealand, and is of Samoan descent, originating from Lalomanu Aileipata. Maumalo attended Southern Cross Campus in South Auckland.

Maumalo is the first cousin of Melbourne Storm prop Nelson Asofa-Solomona.

== Playing career ==
=== Early years ===
He played junior football for the Papatoetoe Panthers, Mangere East Hawks and Counties Manukau Stingrays before being signed by the New Zealand Warriors. Maumalo played for New Zealand Residents under-18s in 2012. Maumalo played for the Warriors' NYC team in 2013 and 2014 before moving to the Warriors' New South Wales Cup team in 2015. Maumalo played in the 2014 Holden Cup grand final against the Brisbane Broncos off the interchange bench in the 34–32 victory.

=== 2015 ===
On 16 January 2015, Maumalo was named in the Warriors' 2015 Auckland Nines squad. After impressing in pre-season trials, he was expected to make his NRL debut in round one before being ruled out with a hamstring injury. Maumalo made his NRL debut in round 10 of the 2015 NRL season, against the Parramatta Eels on the wing at Parramatta Stadium.

=== 2016 ===
On 8 October 2016, Maumalo made his International debut for Samoa in their historical test match against Fiji in Apia. He scored two tries in Samoa's 18–20 loss.

=== 2017 ===
Maumalo admitted he almost finalised a mid-season move to the St George Illawarra Dragons in May last year, before the Warriors blocked it and instead re-signed him through until the end of 2018.

"It was pretty close, my manager was sorting it out and I was about to leave the week before [playing for the Dragons] but then got told to stay," Maumalo said.

=== 2018 ===
On 10 August 2018, Maumalo ran 208 metres from 22 runs during the Warriors' 18–12 triumph over the St. George Illawarra Dragons.

Maumalo said he needed to focus on his defence due to his poor 68% tackle-efficiency that season. "I feel like just my defensive reads have been a little off next to Sol (centre Solomone Kata). I feel I can really knuckle up on that a bit better and just sticking to my tackles," he said.

=== 2019 ===
On 19 July 2019, Maumalo was ruled out of Friday night's game against the Cronulla-Sutherland Sharks due to a concussion sustained the previous weekend against the Broncos. He was replaced by outside back, Blake Ayshford on the wing.

At the conclusion of the 2019 NRL season, Maumalo lead the NRL in post-contact metres with 1,490 and finished in the top 5 for most tries with 17.

=== 2020 ===
Despite the sacking of Stephen Kearney after the New Zealand Warriors had a streak of poor performances, Maumalo continued his try-scoring form; ending Round 11 with 5 tries from eight games. However, the Warriors' historic stay in Australia took a heavy toll on Maumalo, by means of being away from his family. Hence, Maumalo flew back to New Zealand on 27 July 2020 among other teammates and is not expected to return for the remainder of the 2020 NRL season.

=== 2021 ===
In June 2021, it was announced that Maumalo had signed a two-year deal to join the Wests Tigers. Maumalo was then granted an immediate switch. He played his final game for New Zealand in round 14 of the 2021 NRL season where he scored a hat-trick in a 42–16 loss against Melbourne.

Maumalo made his debut for the Wests Tigers in round 15 against Melbourne which ended in a 66–16 defeat.

In round 19, he scored two tries for the Wests Tigers in a 44–24 loss against Manly. In round 21, he scored another double, this time in a 28–16 victory over Canterbury.

=== 2022 ===
In his first full season with Wests Tigers, Maumalo was named one of five captains of the club, alongside James Tamou, Luke Brooks, Adam Doueihi and Tyrone Peachey. The Sydney Morning Herald said, "Maumolo was seen as the biggest shock inclusion, especially given most fans view him as a softly-spoken winger, but the Tigers have been impressed with how much he has discovered his voice since he joined the club midway through last year." In his first game after, he ran for 122 metres and scored two tries, his third double in 11 games at the club. In round 2, he captained his first and only game for the Tigers against the Newcastle Knights in a 4–26 defeat. In round 11 of the 2022 NRL season, he scored two tries in a 36–22 victory over Canterbury at Leichhardt Oval. He played a total of 19 matches for the Wests Tigers and scored 12 tries as the club finished bottom of the table and claimed the wooden spoon for the first time.

=== 2023 ===
On 23 March, Maumalo was granted an immediate release from his Wests Tigers contract to join the Gold Coast. Maumalo was released by Wests despite the fact he had finished as the club's top try scorer during the 2022 season.

Maumalo did not play any NRL games for the Gold Coast in 2023, instead spending the year with the Burleigh Bears, a Gold Coast affiliate side in the Queensland Cup. Maumalo played 14 games of the regular season, scoring 11 tries. Maumalo also played in the Bears 57-8 preliminary final win over Wynnum Manly, scoring a try.

=== 2024 ===
Maumalo spent the entirety of 2024 in the Queensland Cup, playing 17 games and scoring 6 tries. He has been named in the top 30 for Gold Coast Titans for the 2025 NRL season.

=== 2025 ===
On 23 April, the Gold Coast announced that Maumalo was released from the remainder of his contract. Maumalo played no first grade games for the Gold Coast outfit prior to his release. Maumalo has then announced his retirement and was part of the retiring class of 2025.

== Statistics ==
Year	Team	Games	Tries	Pts
2015	New Zealand Warriors	8	1	4
2016	New Zealand Warriors	10	1	4
2017	New Zealand Warriors	23	7	28
2018	New Zealand Warriors	23	5	20
2019	New Zealand Warriors	23	17	68
2020	New Zealand Warriors	8	5	20
2021	New Zealand Warriors	11	8	32
2021	Wests Tigers	10	7	28
2022	Wests Tigers	19	12	48
	Totals	135	63	252
