= 2015 New Zealand Warriors season =

Team information
- CEO: Wayne Scurrah
- Coach: Andrew McFadden
- Assistant coach: Tony Iro; Andrew Webster
- Captain: Simon Mannering
- Stadium: Mount Smart Stadium

Top scorers
- Tries: Solomone Kata (12)
- Goals: Shaun Johnson (48)
- Points: Shaun Johnson (130)
← 2014	2016 →

A special logo was used for the 2015 season.

The 2015 New Zealand Warriors season was the 21st in the club's history. Coached by Andrew McFadden and captained by Simon Mannering, the Warriors competed in the National Rugby League's 2015 Telstra Premiership. They also competed in the 2015 NRL Auckland Nines tournament.

== Milestones ==
- 13 February: Manu Vatuvei and Nathan Friend were selected to play for the NRL All Stars team in the NRL All Stars game.
- 7 March – round 1: Solomone Kata, Bodene Thompson, Ryan Hoffman, Sam Lisone and Albert Vete made their debut for the club. Kata, Lisone and Vete were also making their first grade debut.
- 15 March – round 2: Jonathan Wright made his debut for the club.
- 21 March – round 3: Nathan Friend played in his 200th NRL match. Ben Henry also played in his 50th NRL match.
- 29 March – round 4: Matt Allwood made his debut for the club.
- 6 April – round 5: Ryan Hoffman played in his 250th NRL match.
- 11 April – round 6: Manu Vatuvei played in his 200th match for the Warriors.
- 25 April – round 8: Raymond Faitala-Mariner made his first grade debut.
- 2 May: Bunty Afoa, Marata Niukore, Toafofoa Sipley and Jazz Tevaga played for the Junior Kiwis. Dominique Peyroux and Sam Lisone represented Samoa while Tuimoala Lolohea, Konrad Hurrell, Solomone Kata and Albert Vete played for Tonga.
- 3 May: Shaun Johnson, Thomas Leuluai, Simon Mannering, Ben Matulino, Manu Vatuvei all played for the New Zealand national rugby league team in the 2015 Anzac Test.
- 16 May – round 10: Ken Maumalo made his first grade debut.
- May to July: Ryan Hoffman represented New South Wales and Jacob Lillyman represented Queensland in the 2015 State of Origin series.
- 13 June – round 14: Manu Vatuvei scored his 10th try of the season, becoming the first player to score 10 tries in 10 consecutive seasons.
- 27 June – round 15: Jacob Lillyman played in his 200th NRL match and Bodene Thompson played in his 100th NRL match.
- 19 July – round 19: Shaun Johnson played in his 100th match for the Warriors.
- 22 August – round 24: Mason Lino made his first grade debut.
- 8 October: Tuimoala Lolohea and Ben Matulino were named in the squad for the New Zealand tour of Great Britain. Sam Tomkins was also named in the England squad.
- 17 October: Solomone Kata and Albert Vete played for Tonga in a World Cup qualifier.

== Jersey and sponsors ==
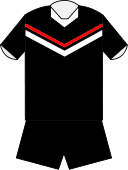

In 2015 the Warriors jerseys were again made by Canterbury of New Zealand.

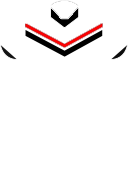

== Fixtures ==
=== Pre-season training ===
The bulk of the Warriors' 2015 NRL squad began preseason training on 3 November 2014.

=== Auckland Nines ===
The Warriors finished second in the Hunua pool at the 2015 NRL Auckland Nines before being eliminated by the Cronulla Sharks in the quarterfinals.

The squad for the Nines was Shaun Johnson (c), Matthew Allwood, Nathan Friend, Ben Henry, Ryan Hoffman, Solomone Kata, Ngani Laumape, Sam Lisone, Tuimoala Lolohea, Sione Lousi, Suaia Matagi, Ben Matulino, Ken Maumalo, Nathaniel Roache, Bodene Thompson, Sam Tomkins, Chad Townsend and Manu Vatuvei. Simon Mannering, Dominique Peyroux, Sebastine Ikahihifo and Jonathan Wright were originally named in a 22-man training squad.

Solomone Kata was named in the team of the tournament.

Pos	Team	Pld	W	D	L	PF	PA	PD	Pts
1	Wests Tigers	3	2	0	1	50	32	+18	4
2	New Zealand Warriors	3	2	0	1	58	41	+17	4
3	Gold Coast Titans	3	1	0	2	48	56	−8	2
4	Canberra Raiders	3	1	0	2	46	73	−27	2

Date	Round	Opponent	Venue	Result	Score	Tries	Goals	Attendance	Report
31 January	Hunua 1	Gold Coast Titans	Eden Park, Auckland	Win	17–10	Kata, Hoffman, Lolohea	Johnson (2)	43,000	
31 January	Hunua 2	Canberra Raiders	Eden Park, Auckland	Loss	19–23	Johnson, Maumalo, Lolohea, Allwood	Johnson (1)	43,000	
1 February	Hunua 3	Wests Tigers	Eden Park, Auckland	Win	22–8	Kata (2), Vatuvei, Lolohea, Henry	Johnson (1)	43,000	
1 February	Quarter Final	Cronulla Sharks	Eden Park, Auckland	Loss	12–14	Vatuvei, Kata, Laumape		43,000	

Quarter-Finals
Parramatta Eels	17
North Queensland Cowboys	11
South Sydney Rabbitohs	30
Newcastle Knights	6
Wests Tigers	4
Sydney Roosters	22
Cronulla Sharks	14
New Zealand Warriors	12

Semi-Finals
Parramatta Eels	6
South Sydney Rabbitohs	37
Sydney Roosters	4
Cronulla Sharks	10

Final
South Sydney Rabbitohs	18
Cronulla Sharks	14

=== Pre-season matches ===
The Warriors were planning to host the St. George Illawarra Dragons at Trafalgar Park in Nelson, however the match was cancelled when the Dragons were invited to compete in the World Club Series. It would have been the first time the Warriors had played in Nelson.

Date	Round	Opponent	Venue	Result	Score	Tries	Goals	Attendance	Report
7 February	Trial 1	Gold Coast Titans	Clive Berghofer Stadium, Toowoomba	Loss	12–22	Peyroux, Peteru	Pewhairangi (2)	6,827	
14 February	Trial 2	Penrith Panthers	Rotorua International Stadium, Rotorua	Win	18–4	Maumalo (2), Niukore, Johnson	Townsend (1)	9,000	
21 February	Trial 3	Warriors NSW Cup	Bruce Pulman Park, Papakura	Win	42–14	Hurrell (2), Vatuvei, Tomkins, Friend, Kata, Mannering, Johnson	Johnson (5)	2,000	

=== Regular season ===
All home matches were played at Mount Smart Stadium in Auckland, with the exception of the Round 22 match, which was played at Westpac Stadium in Wellington. It was the third year in a row the Warriors took a match to Wellington, as part of the "Capital Clash".

Date	Round	Opponent	Venue	Result	Score	Tries	Goals	Attendance	Report
7 March	Round 1	Newcastle Knights	Hunter Stadium, Newcastle	Loss	14–24	Leuluai, Hoffman	Johnson (3)	16,146	
15 March	Round 2	Canberra Raiders	GIO Stadium, Canberra	Win	18–6	Vatuvei, Kata, Hoffman	Johnson (3)	8,241	
21 March	Round 3	Parramatta Eels	Mount Smart Stadium, Auckland	Win	29–16	Kata (2), Hoffman, Lolohea, Vatuvei	Johnson (4 & FG)	14,112	
29 March	Round 4	Brisbane Broncos	Mount Smart Stadium, Auckland	Loss	16–24	Townsend, Allwood, Kata	Johnson (2)	14,670	
6 April	Round 5	Melbourne Storm	AAMI Park, Melbourne	Loss	14–30	Vatuvei, Friend, Ikahihifo	Johnson (1)	18,179	
11 April	Round 6	Wests Tigers	Mount Smart Stadium, Auckland	Win	32–22	Vatuvei (2), Townsend, Lolohea, Johnson, Thompson	Johnson (4)	13,781	
18 April	Round 7	North Queensland Cowboys	1300SMILES Stadium, Townsville	Loss	24–28	Hurrell, Wright, Kata, Vatuvei	Johnson (4)	16,038	
25 April	Round 8	Gold Coast Titans	Mount Smart Stadium, Auckland	Loss	28–32	Fusitu'a, Matulino, Wright, Kata, Thompson	Johnson (4)	15,102	
9 May	Round 9	Cronulla Sharks	Remondis Stadium, Sydney	Win	20–16	Wright, Vatuvei, Kata, Johnson	Johnson (2)	13,988	
16 May	Round 10	Parramatta Eels	Parramatta Stadium, Sydney	Win	17–13 (A.E.T.)	Kata, Johnson, Thompson	Johnson (2); Townsend (FG)	11,152	
	Round 11	Bye							
31 May	Round 12	Newcastle Knights	Mount Smart Stadium, Auckland	Win	24–20	Lolohea, Vatuvei, Kata, Matulino, Wright	Johnson (2)	13,203	
6 June	Round 13	South Sydney Rabbitohs	NIB Stadium, Perth	Loss	4–36	Vatuvei		20,272	
13 June	Round 14	Sydney Roosters	Mount Smart Stadium, Auckland	Loss	21–25	Kata (2), Lolohea, Vatuvei	Johnson (2 & FG)	14,167	
20 June	Round 15	Gold Coast Titans	Cbus Super Stadium, Robina	Win	36–14	Johnson (2), Friend, Faitala-Mariner, Hurrell, Thompson	Johnson (6)	14,132	
27 June	Round 16	Canberra Raiders	Mount Smart Stadium, Auckland	Win	30–8	Lolohea (2), Thompson, Johnson, Vatuvei	Johnson (5)	13,110	
	Round 17	Bye							
12 July	Round 18	Melbourne Storm	Mount Smart Stadium, Auckland	Win	28–14	Lolohea (2), Fusitua, Thompson, Johnson	Johnson (4)	17,278	
19 July	Round 19	Sydney Roosters	Sydney Football Stadium, Sydney	Loss	0–24			16,301	
25 July	Round 20	Manly-Warringah Sea Eagles	Mount Smart Stadium, Auckland	Loss	12–32	Johnson, Vete	Lolohea (2)	15,812	
1 August	Round 21	Cronulla Sharks	Mount Smart Stadium, Auckland	Loss	14–18	Hurrell, Mannering	Lolohea (3)	12,481	
8 August	Round 22	St. George Illawarra Dragons	Westpac Stadium, Wellington	Loss	0–36			18,317	
15 August	Round 23	Penrith Panthers	Sportingbet Stadium, Sydney	Loss	10–24	Tomkins, Hurrell	Lolohea (1)	6,774	
22 August	Round 24	North Queensland Cowboys	Mount Smart Stadium, Auckland	Loss	16–50	Lolohea, Maumalo, Peyroux	Lolohea (2)	14,412	
20 August	Round 25	Wests Tigers	Campbelltown Sports Stadium, Sydney	Loss	16–50	Allwood (2), Vete	Lolohea (2)	6,700	
6 September	Round 26	Canterbury-Bankstown Bulldogs	ANZ Stadium, Sydney	Loss	22–26	Lolohea (2), Friend, Kata	Lolohea (2)	14,821	

== Ladder ==
2015 NRL season
Pos	Team	Pld	W	D	L	B	PF	PA	PD	Pts
1	Sydney Roosters	24	18	0	6	2	591	300	+291	40
2	Brisbane Broncos	24	17	0	7	2	574	379	+195	38
3	North Queensland Cowboys (P)	24	17	0	7	2	587	454	+133	38
4	Melbourne Storm	24	14	0	10	2	467	348	+119	32
5	Canterbury-Bankstown Bulldogs	24	14	0	10	2	522	480	+42	32
6	Cronulla-Sutherland Sharks	24	14	0	10	2	469	476	−7	32
7	South Sydney Rabbitohs	24	13	0	11	2	465	467	−2	30
8	St. George Illawarra Dragons	24	12	0	12	2	435	408	+27	28
9	Manly-Warringah Sea Eagles	24	11	0	13	2	458	492	−34	26
10	Canberra Raiders	24	10	0	14	2	577	569	+8	24
11	Penrith Panthers	24	9	0	15	2	399	477	−78	22
12	Parramatta Eels	24	9	0	15	2	448	573	−125	22
13	New Zealand Warriors	24	9	0	15	2	445	588	−143	22
14	Gold Coast Titans	24	9	0	15	2	439	636	−197	22
15	Wests Tigers	24	8	0	16	2	487	562	−75	20
16	Newcastle Knights	24	8	0	16	2	458	612	−154	20

== Squad ==
No.	Name	Position	Warriors debut	App	T	G	FG	Pts
105	Thomas Leuluai	HB	2 May 2003	10	1	0	0	4
115	Manu Vatuvei	WG	23 May 2004	16	11	0	0	44
125	Simon Mannering	SR	26 June 2005	24	1	0	0	4
131	Sam Rapira	PR	20 May 2006	4	0	0	0	0
142	Ben Matulino	PR	14 June 2008	21	2	0	0	8
146	Jacob Lillyman	PR	14 March 2009	21	0	0	0	0
159	Sione Lousi	SR	14 March 2010	7	0	0	0	0
163	Glen Fisiiahi	FB	12 March 2011	1	0	0	0	0
168	Shaun Johnson	HB	4 June 2011	18	8	48	2	130
171	Ben Henry	SR	4 March 2012	4	0	0	0	0
172	Nathan Friend	HK	4 March 2012	24	3	0	0	12
173	Konrad Hurrell	CE	4 March 2012	12	4	0	0	16
176	Sebastine Ikahihifo	LK	28 July 2012	9	1	0	0	4
180	Ngani Laumape	WG	24 March 2013	0	0	0	0	0
181	Suaia Matagi	PR	11 May 2013	1	0	0	0	0
182	Dominique Peyroux	CE	3 June 2013	8	1	0	0	4
183	Charlie Gubb	PR	7 July 2013	9	0	0	0	0
185	Sam Tomkins	FB	9 March 2014	13	1	0	0	4
186	Chad Townsend	HB	9 March 2014	22	2	0	1	9
188	John Palavi	PR	9 March 2014	0	0	0	0	0
189	David Fusitua	WG	15 March 2014	3	2	0	0	8
190	Siliva Havili	HK	13 April 2014	8	0	0	0	0
192	Tuimoala Lolohea	HB	27 July 2014	23	11	13	0	70
193	Solomone Kata	CE	7 March 2015	24	12	0	0	48
194	Bodene Thompson	SR	7 March 2015	21	6	0	0	24
195	Ryan Hoffman	SR	7 March 2015	18	3	0	0	12
196	Sam Lisone	PR	7 March 2015	18	0	0	0	0
197	Albert Vete	PR	7 March 2015	21	2	0	0	8
198	Jonathan Wright	WG	15 March 2015	20	4	0	0	16
199	Matt Allwood	CE	29 March 2015	3	3	0	0	12
200	Raymond Faitala-Mariner	SR	25 April 2015	11	1	0	0	4
201	Ken Maumalo	WG	16 May 2015	8	1	0	0	4
202	Mason Lino	HB	22 August 2015	3	0	0	0	0

== Staff ==
- Chief executive officer: Jim Doyle
- General manager: Don Mann Jr
- General manager football operations: Dean Bell
- Medical services manager: John Mayhew
- Welfare and education manager: Jerry Seuseu
- Media and communications manager: Richard Becht

=== Coaching staff ===
- NRL head coach: Andrew McFadden
- NRL assistant coach: Tony Iro
- NRL assistant coach: Andrew Webster
- NSW Cup head coach: Stacey Jones
- NSW Cup assistant coach: George Carmont
- NSW Cup assistant coach: Willie Swann
- NYC head coach: Kelvin Wright

== Transfers ==
=== Gains ===
Player	Previous club	Length	Notes
Ryan Hoffman	Melbourne Storm	3 years	
Matt Allwood	Canberra Raiders	3 years	
Bodene Thompson	Wests Tigers	3 years	
Api Pewhairangi	Parramatta Eels	1 year	
Jonathan Wright	Cronulla Sharks	1 year	

=== Losses ===
Player	Club	Notes
Jerome Ropati	Retired	
Kevin Locke	Salford Red Devils	2014 Mid-season transfer
Carlos Tuimavave	Newcastle Knights	
Feleti Mateo	Manly Sea Eagles	
Sam Lousi	New South Wales Waratahs	
Jayson Bukuya	Cronulla-Sutherland Sharks	
Dane Nielsen	St. George-Illawarra Dragons	
Agnatius Paasi	Gold Coast Titans	
Suaia Matagi	Sydney Roosters	2015 Mid-season transfer
Nathaniel Peteru	Gold Coast Titans	2015 Mid-season transfer
Api Pewhairangi	Connacht (RU)	2015 Mid-season transfer
Ngani Laumape	Manawatu Turbos (RU)	2015 Mid-season transfer

== Other teams ==
As in 2014, the Warriors entered a team into the NSW Cup and the Junior Warriors competed in the Holden Cup.

=== NSW Cup squad ===
The Warriors NSW Cup side finished fourth in the regular season, however lost two consecutive play-off matches and were eliminated from the play-offs. John Palavi was named in the competition's team on the year.

=== Holden Cup squad ===
The Junior Warriors finished 7th to make the finals. They defeated the Roosters and the Broncos before being eliminated by the Penrith Panthers in the preliminary final.

== Club awards ==
Ben Matulino was named as the Warriors player of the year, his second time winning the award. The other finalists for the award were Simon Mannering and Shaun Johnson.

Johnson was awarded the People's choice award, Albert Vete was named the Club person of the year and Tuimoala Lolohea was named the NRL rookie of the year.

John Palavi was named the NSW Cup side's player of the year, while Mason Lino was the sides rookie of the year.

Bunty Afoa was the Junior Warrior's player of the year, while Ata Hingano was the rookie of the year.
