= 2015 Manly Warringah Sea Eagles season =

- NRL rank: 9th
- Play-off result: DNQ
- 2015 record: Wins: 11; draws: 2; losses: 13
- Points scored: For: 458; against: 492

Team information
- CEO: (Australia) Joe Kelly
- Coach: (Australia) Geoff Toovey
- Captain: (Australia) Jamie Lyon
- Stadium: Brookvale Oval
- Avg. attendance: 10,955

Top scorers
- Tries: Brett Stewart (16)
- Points: Jamie Lyon (110)
← 2014	2016 →

The 2015 Manly Warringah Sea Eagles season is the 66th in the club's history. Coached by Geoff Toovey and captained by Jamie Lyon, they compete in the National Rugby League's 2015 Telstra Premiership.

== Squad movement ==
=== Gains ===
Player	Signed from	Until end of	Notes
Willie Mason	Newcastle Knights	2015	
Feleti Mateo	New Zealand Warriors	2016	
Siosaia Vave	Cronulla-Sutherland Sharks	2016	
Brayden Wiliame	Newcastle Knights	-	
Blake Leary	North Queensland Cowboys	2016	

=== Losses ===
Player	Signed To	Until end of	Notes
Zane Tetevano	Sacked	N/A	
Anthony Watmough	Parramatta Eels	-	
Glenn Stewart	South Sydney Rabbitohs	2016	
Jason King	Retirement	-	
Daniel Harrison	London Broncos	-	

== Ladder ==
2015 NRL season
Pos	Team	Pld	W	D	L	B	PF	PA	PD	Pts
1	Sydney Roosters	24	18	0	6	2	591	300	+291	40
2	Brisbane Broncos	24	17	0	7	2	574	379	+195	38
3	North Queensland Cowboys (P)	24	17	0	7	2	587	454	+133	38
4	Melbourne Storm	24	14	0	10	2	467	348	+119	32
5	Canterbury-Bankstown Bulldogs	24	14	0	10	2	522	480	+42	32
6	Cronulla-Sutherland Sharks	24	14	0	10	2	469	476	−7	32
7	South Sydney Rabbitohs	24	13	0	11	2	465	467	−2	30
8	St. George Illawarra Dragons	24	12	0	12	2	435	408	+27	28
9	Manly-Warringah Sea Eagles	24	11	0	13	2	458	492	−34	26
10	Canberra Raiders	24	10	0	14	2	577	569	+8	24
11	Penrith Panthers	24	9	0	15	2	399	477	−78	22
12	Parramatta Eels	24	9	0	15	2	448	573	−125	22
13	New Zealand Warriors	24	9	0	15	2	445	588	−143	22
14	Gold Coast Titans	24	9	0	15	2	439	636	−197	22
15	Wests Tigers	24	8	0	16	2	487	562	−75	20
16	Newcastle Knights	24	8	0	16	2	458	612	−154	20

== Fixtures ==
=== Regular season ===
Date	Round	Opponent	Venue	Score	Tries	Goals	Attendance
Friday 6 March	1	Parramatta Eels	Pirtek Stadium	12-42	B. Stewart, C. Blair	J. Lyon (2/2)	18,718
Saturday 14 March	2	Melbourne Storm	Brookvale Oval	24-22	B. Stewart (2), S. Matai, B. Leary	J. Lyon (4/4)	10,531
Friday 20 March	3	Canterbury-Bankstown Bulldogs	Brookvale Oval	12-16	S. Matai, F. Mateo, P. Hiku	D. Cherry-Evans (0/2); S. Matai (0/1)	10,498
Saturday 28 March	4	St George Illawarra Dragons	WIN Stadium	4-12	B.Wiliame	D. Cherry-Evans (0/1)	12,087
Saturday 4 April	5	Canberra Raiders	Lavington Sports Ground	16-29	T. Trbojevic (2), C. Blair	P. Hiku (1/2); K. Foran (1/1)	6,436
Saturday 11 April	6	Penrith Panthers	Pepper Stadium	12-22	J. Horo, S. Matai	P. Hiku (2/3)	11,170
Friday 17 April	7	Canterbury-Bankstown Bulldogs	ANZ Stadium	16-28	D. Cherry-Evans, P. Hiku, S. Matai	J. Lyon (2/4)	13,568
Saturday 25 April	8	Melbourne Storm	AAMI Park	12-10	T. Symonds, D. Williams	D. Williams (2/3)	13,948
Sunday 10 May	9	Newcastle Knights	Brookvale Oval	30-10	B. Stewart (2) J. Taufua, L. Sao, D. Cherry-Evans	J. Lyon (5/5)	10,056
Monday 18 May	10	Penrith Panthers	Brookvale Oval	10-11	B. Stewart (2)	J. Lyon (1/2)	8,825
	11	BYE					
Saturday 30 May	12	North Queensland Cowboys	1300SMILES Stadium	14-18	J. Taufua (2), T. Trbojevic	J. Lyon (1/3)	14,196
Friday 5 June	13	Brisbane Broncos	Suncorp Stadium	10-44	P. Hiku, B. Stewart	J. Lyon (1/2)	28,691
	14	BYE					
Friday 19 June	15	Wests Tigers	Brookvale Oval	30-20	B. Stewart (2), S. Matai, K. Foran, L. Sao	F. Mateo (5/5)	8,093
Friday 26 June	16	South Sydney Rabbitohs	ANZ Stadium	20-8	P. Hiku, S. Matai	P. Hiku (0/2)	14,236
Sunday 5 July	17	Cronulla-Sutherland Sharks	Brookvale Oval	28-16	J. Taufua (3), S. Matai, D. Cherry-Evans	J. Lyon (4/5)	14,881
Monday 13 July	18	Gold Coast Titans	Cbus Super Stadium	38-6	J. Taufua (2), T. Trbojevic (2), B. Stewart, K. Foran, W. Mason	J. Lyon (5/7)	9,632
Monday 20 July	19	North Queensland Cowboys	Brookvale Oval	12-30	D. Cherry-Evans, B. Stewart	J. Lyon (2/2)	7,643
Saturday 25 July	20	New Zealand Warriors	Mt Smart Stadium	32-12	J. Taufua (2), B. Stewart (2), J. Trbojevic, M. Ballin	J. Lyon (5/7)	15,812
Saturday 1 August	21	Brisbane Broncos	Central Coast Stadium	44-12	K. Foran (2), T. Trbojevic (2), D. Cherry-Evans, J. Lyon, F. Mateo, J. Sene-Lefao	J. Lyon (6/8)	16,280
Friday 7 August	22	South Sydney Rabbitohs	Brookvale Oval	28-8	P. Hiku (3), J. Trbojevic (2)	J. Lyon (4/6)	15,083
Sunday 16 August	23	Canberra Raiders	GIO Stadium	26-24	J. Lyon (2), B. Stewart (2), S. Matai	J. Lyon (3/5)	13,113
Sunday 23 August	24	Parramatta Eels	Brookvale Oval	16-20	J. Hasson, P. Hiku, S. Matai	J. Lyon (2/3)	11,018
Friday 28 August	25	Sydney Roosters	Brookvale Oval	10-46	J. Lyon, T. Symonds	J. Lyon (1/1); D. Cherry-Evans (0/1)	12,911
Saturday 6 September	26	Cronulla-Sutherland Sharks	Remondis Stadium	14-12	J. Sene-Lefao, T. Trbojevic	K. Foran (3/4)	19,146

== Player statistics ==
Player statistics for the 2015 Manly Warringah Sea Eagles.

Player	Games	Tries	Goals	Field goals	Points
Matt Ballin	22	1	0	0	4
Cheyse Blair	7	2	0	0	8
Jamie Buhrer	7	0	0	0	0
Luke Burgess	18	0	0	0	0
Michael Chee-Kam	4	0	0	0	0
Daly Cherry-Evans	23	5	0/4	0	20
Kieran Foran	19	4	4/5	0	24
Clint Gutherson	1	0	0	0	0
James Hasson	10	1	0	0	4
Peta Hiku	22	8	3/7	0	38
Jayden Hodges	7	0	0	0	0
Justin Horo	18	1	0	0	4
Brenton Lawrence	1	0	0	0	0
Blake Leary	13	1	0	0	4
Dunamis Lui	17	0	0	0	0
Jamie Lyon	17	4	47/65	0	110
Willie Mason	20	1	0	0	4
Steve Matai	19	9	0/1	0	36
Feleti Mateo	19	2	5/5	0	18
Ligi Sao	20	2	0	0	8
Jesse Sene-Lefao	11	2	0	0	8
Josh Starling	14	0	0	0	0
Brett Stewart	22	16	0	0	64
Tom Symonds	20	2	0	0	8
Jorge Taufua	17	10	0	0	40
Jake Trbojevic	23	3	0	0	12
Tom Trbojevic	9	8	0	0	32
Brayden Wiliame	5	1	0	0	4
David Williams	3	1	2/3	0	8
TOTAL		84	61/89	0	458

== 2016 Season Awards ==
Manly Warringah 2016 Club Awards (NRL only):

- Roy Bull Best & Fairest: Jake Trbojevic;
- Gordon Willoughby Medal - Members’ Player of the Year: Brett Stewart;
- Doug Daley Memorial Award - Clubman of the Year: Josh Starling;
- Players’ Player Award: Brett Stewart;
- Ken Arthurson Award - Rookie of the Year: Tom Trbojevic;
- Leading point scorer: Jamie Lyon (110 - 4 tries, 47 goals);
- Leading try scorer: Brett Stewart (16).
