= 2015 Parramatta Eels season =

Australia Rugby League Parramatta Eels 2016 season

- NRL Rank: 12th
- Play-off result: DNQ
- World Club Challenge: DNQ
- Auckland Nines: Semi-finalists (Lost 6–37 vs South Sydney Rabbitohs, 1st Semi Final)
- 2015 record: Wins: 9; draws: 0; losses: 15
- Points scored: For: 448; against: 573

Team information
- CEO: Scott Seward; John Boulous (Interim)
- Coach: (Australia) Brad Arthur
- Captain: (Lebanon) Tim Mannah
- Stadium: Pirtek Stadium (Capacity: 20,741); ANZ Stadium (Capacity: 83,500); TIO Stadium (Capacity: 12,500)
- Avg. attendance: 14,699 (Home); 15,384 (Home & Away)
- Agg. attendance: 176,385 (Home); 369,214 (Home & Away)
- High attendance: 35,510 (6 April vs Wests Tigers, Round 5)

Top scorers
- Tries: (Fiji) Semi Radradra (24)
- Goals: (Australia) Chris Sandow (33)
- Points: (Fiji) Semi Radradra (88)
← 2014	List of seasons	2016 →

The 2015 Parramatta Eels season is the 69th in the club's history. Coached by Brad Arthur and captained by Tim Mannah, they competed in the NRL's 2015 Telstra Premiership.

== Summary ==
Before the start of the 2015 season, the club were hit with the news that star player Jarryd Hayne would be terminating his contract in order to pursue a career in the NFL. However, in the opening round of the season, Parramatta recorded an impressive 42-12 victory over Manly. The club would only go on to win a further two games and by round 11 sat bottom of the table. During the losing streak, Parramatta suffered narrow losses including the round 10 defeat against the New Zealand Warriors in golden point extra-time. Parramatta lost the match 17-13 with Luke Kelly missing three conversion attempts including one right next to the uprights.

In round 13 of the competition, Parramatta lead North Queensland 30-6 with 20 minutes left to play but would go on to lose 36-30 after North Queensland scored five tries in 12 minutes. Parramatta recovered by then winning three games in succession to lift them away from last place. Parramatta would win two of their remaining eight matches to finish 12th. Towards the end of the season, winger Semi Radradra broke the clubs most tries in a season record with 24 tries.

== Standings ==
=== National Rugby League ===
2015 NRL season
Pos	Team	Pld	W	D	L	B	PF	PA	PD	Pts
1	Sydney Roosters	24	18	0	6	2	591	300	+291	40
2	Brisbane Broncos	24	17	0	7	2	574	379	+195	38
3	North Queensland Cowboys (P)	24	17	0	7	2	587	454	+133	38
4	Melbourne Storm	24	14	0	10	2	467	348	+119	32
5	Canterbury-Bankstown Bulldogs	24	14	0	10	2	522	480	+42	32
6	Cronulla-Sutherland Sharks	24	14	0	10	2	469	476	−7	32
7	South Sydney Rabbitohs	24	13	0	11	2	465	467	−2	30
8	St. George Illawarra Dragons	24	12	0	12	2	435	408	+27	28
9	Manly-Warringah Sea Eagles	24	11	0	13	2	458	492	−34	26
10	Canberra Raiders	24	10	0	14	2	577	569	+8	24
11	Penrith Panthers	24	9	0	15	2	399	477	−78	22
12	Parramatta Eels	24	9	0	15	2	448	573	−125	22
13	New Zealand Warriors	24	9	0	15	2	445	588	−143	22
14	Gold Coast Titans	24	9	0	15	2	439	636	−197	22
15	Wests Tigers	24	8	0	16	2	487	562	−75	20
16	Newcastle Knights	24	8	0	16	2	458	612	−154	20

=== National Youth Competition ===
2015 NYC season
Pos	Team	Pld	W	D	L	B	PF	PA	PD	Pts
1	Penrith Panthers (P)	24	20	0	4	2	772	434	+338	44
2	North Queensland Cowboys	24	19	1	4	2	923	450	+473	43
3	Brisbane Broncos	24	17	1	6	2	833	570	+263	39
4	Manly Warringah Sea Eagles	24	13	3	8	2	696	568	+128	33
5	Wests Tigers	24	12	1	11	2	712	598	+114	29
6	Sydney Roosters	24	12	1	11	2	731	668	+63	29
7	New Zealand Warriors	24	11	2	11	2	654	562	+92	28
8	Canberra Raiders	24	12	0	12	2	646	811	-165	28
9	Melbourne Storm	24	10	1	13	2	588	743	-155	25
10	Canterbury-Bankstown Bulldogs	24	9	2	13	2	580	623	-43	24
11	Newcastle Knights	24	10	0	14	2	539	776	-237	24
12	Gold Coast Titans	24	9	0	15	2	596	687	-91	22
13	Parramatta Eels	24	8	2	14	2	541	752	-151	22
14	St George Illawarra Dragons	24	8	0	16	2	574	716	-142	20
15	Cronulla-Sutherland Sharks	24	7	2	15	2	481	762	-281	20
16	South Sydney Rabbitohs	24	6	2	16	2	528	674	-146	18

== Fixtures ==
=== Home and away season ===
Round	Home	Score	Away	Match Information
Round	Home	Score	Away	Date and time (Local)	Venue (Broadcaster)	Attendance
1	Parramatta Eels	42 – 12	Manly-Warringah Sea Eagles	6 March 2015, 7:45pm	Pirtek Stadium (Nine Network)	18,718
2	Canterbury-Bankstown Bulldogs	32 – 12	Parramatta Eels	13 March 2015, 7:35pm	ANZ Stadium (Nine Network)	28,876
3	New Zealand Warriors	29 – 16	Parramatta Eels	21 March 2015, 5:00pm	Mt Smart Stadium (Fox Sports)	14,112
4	Parramatta Eels	29 – 16	South Sydney Rabbitohs	27 March 2015, 7:35pm	Pirtek Stadium (Nine Network)	15,562
5	Parramatta Eels	6 – 22	Wests Tigers	6 April 2015, 3:00pm	ANZ Stadium (Fox Sports)	35,510
6	Parramatta Eels	16 – 38	Gold Coast Titans	11 April 2015, 3:00pm	Pirtek Stadium (Fox Sports)	11,136
7	Newcastle Knights	22 – 28	Parramatta Eels	19 April 2015, 4:00pm	Hunter Stadium (Nine Network)	16,953
8	Brisbane Broncos	28 – 16	Parramatta Eels	25 April 2015, 8:00pm	Suncorp Stadium (Fox Sports)	34,398
9	Parramatta Eels	10 – 28	Melbourne Storm	10 May 2015, 4:00pm	Pirtek Stadium (Nine Network)	10,505
10	Parramatta Eels	13 – 17	New Zealand Warriors	16 May 2015, 3:00pm	Pirtek Stadium (Fox Sports)	11,152
11	South Sydney Rabbitohs	14 – 12	Parramatta Eels	22 May 2015, 7:45pm	ANZ Stadium (Nine Network)	11,658
12	Penrith Panthers	20 – 26	Parramatta Eels	29 May 2015, 7:45pm	Pepper Stadium (Nine Network)	17,821
13	Parramatta Eels	30 – 36	North Queensland Cowboys	8 June 2015, 7:00pm	Pirtek Stadium (Fox Sports)	9,812
14	Melbourne Storm	22 – 26	Parramatta Eels	15 June 2015, 7:00pm	AAMI Park (Fox Sports)	10,128
Bye Round
16	Parramatta Eels	16 – 12	St. George Illawarra Dragons	27 June 2015, 7:30pm	Pirtek Stadium (Fox Sports)	15,046
17	Wests Tigers	16 – 28	Parramatta Eels	6 July 2015, 7:00pm	ANZ Stadium (Fox Sports)	15,347
Bye Round
19	Parramatta Eels	4 – 28	Canterbury-Bankstown Bulldogs	17 July 2015, 7:35pm	ANZ Stadium (Nine Network)	17,082
20	North Queensland Cowboys	46 – 4	Parramatta Eels	27 July 2015, 7:00pm	1300SMILES Stadium (Fox Sports)	13,767
21	Gold Coast Titans	24 – 14	Parramatta Eels	3 August 2015, 7:00pm	Cbus Super Stadium (Fox Sports)	7,495
22	Parramatta Eels	10 – 4	Penrith Panthers	8 August 2015, 7:00pm	TIO Stadium (Fox Sports)	8,340
23	Sydney Roosters	28 – 18	Parramatta Eels	15 August 2015, 7:30pm	Allianz Stadium (Fox Sports)	11,255
24	Manly-Warringah Sea Eagles	16 – 20	Parramatta Eels	23 August 2015, 4:00pm	Brookvale Oval (Nine Network)	11,018
25	Parramatta Eels	28 – 35	Cronulla-Sutherland Sharks	29 August 2015, 3:00pm	Pirtek Stadium (Fox Sports)	11,778
26	Parramatta Eels	24 – 28	Canberra Raiders	6 September 2015, 2:00pm	Pirtek Stadium (Fox Sports)	10,515

== Players and staff ==
Parramatta Eels – 2015 squad
First team squad			Coaching staff
Daniel Alvaro – PR; Beau Champion – CE, WG; Ben Crooks (gk) – CE, WG; Isaac De Gois – HK; Zach Dockar-Clay – HB, HK; Kenny Edwards – SR, LK; Richard Fa'aoso – PR, SR; Bureta Faraimo – WG; John Folau – CE, WG; Fabian Goodall – CE, WG; David Gower – SR, LK, PR; William Hopoate – CE, WG; Tui Kamikamica – SR	Halauafu Lavaka – WG; Darcy Lussick – PR, LK; Manu Ma'u – SR; Tim Mannah (c) – PR; Ryan Matterson – FE; Tepai Moeroa – SR; Ryan Morgan – CE; Cody Nelson – SR, FE; Eric Newbigging – PR; Corey Norman (gk) – FE, FB; Pauli Pauli – SR, PR; Joseph Paulo (gk) – LK, FE; Junior Paulo – SR, CE	Kaysa Pritchard – HK; Semi Radradra – WG; Reece Robinson – FB; Brad Takairangi – SR, CE; Peni Terepo – PR, SR, LK; Vai Toutai – CE, WG; Joseph Ualesi – SR, LK; Anthony Watmough – SR, LK; Danny Wicks – PR, SR	Head coach: Brad Arthur; Assistant coaches: Peter Gentle (assistant); Steve Murphy (assistant); Paul Devlin (strength and conditioning); Legend: (c) Captain(s); (vc) Vice-captain(s); (gk) Goal kicker; Injured; Updated: 27 September 2014; Source(s): Eels Squad 2015

== Transfers ==
In:

Nat.	Pos.	Name	From	Ref.
(Portugal)	HK	Isaac De Gois	Cronulla-Sutherland Sharks	
(Australia)	CE	Beau Champion	South Sydney Rabbitohs	
(England)	CE	Ben Crooks	Hull F.C.	
(Australia)	SR	Cody Nelson	Gold Coast Titans	
(Cook Islands)	CE	Brad Takairangi	Gold Coast Titans	
(Australia)	SR	Anthony Watmough	Manly-Warringah Sea Eagles	
(Lebanon)	FB	Reece Robinson	Canberra Raiders	
(Australia)	FB	Adam Quinlan	St George Illawarra Dragons	

Out:

Nat.	Pos.	Name	To	Ref.
(Australia)	SR	Daniel Harrison	Manly-Warringah Sea Eagles	
(Italy)	LK	Brenden Santi	Wests Tigers	
(Fiji)	CE	Jacob Loko	Canterbury-Bankstown Bulldogs	
(New Zealand)	HB	Liam Foran	London Broncos	
(Australia)	CE	Willie Tonga	Catalans Dragons	
(Australia)	WG	Ken Sio	Hull Kingston Rovers	
(Australia)	SR	Kelepi Tanginoa	North Queensland Cowboys	
(Australia)	FB	Jarryd Hayne	San Francisco 49ers (NFL)	
(Australia)	FB	Evander Cummins	Redcliffe Dolphins	
(New Zealand)	SR	Lorenzo Ma'afu	Townsville Blackhawks	
(Australia)	PR	Mitchell Allgood	Hull Kingston Rovers	
(England)	PR	Lee Mossop	Wigan Warriors	
(Australia)	FB	Justin Hunt	St George Illawarra Dragons	
(Tonga)	PR	Fuifui Moimoi	Leigh Centurions	
(Ireland)	FE	Api Pewhairangi	New Zealand Warriors	
(Australia)	SR	Ben Smith	Retired	
