= 2015 Cronulla-Sutherland Sharks season =

- NRL rank: 6th
- 2015 record: Wins: 14; losses: 10
- Points scored: For: 469; against: 476

Team information
- CEO: Lyall Gorman
- Coach: Shane Flanagan
- Assistant coach: Steve Price
- Captains: Paul Gallen; Wade Graham
- Stadium: Remondis Stadium
- Avg. attendance: 11,925

Top scorers
- Tries: Valentine Holmes (16)
- Goals: Michael Gordon (69)
- Points: Michael Gordon (152)
← 2014	2016 →

The 2015 Cronulla-Sutherland Sharks season is the 49th in the club's history. Coached by Shane Flanagan and captained by Paul Gallen, they competed in the NRL's 2015 Telstra Premiership. Starting the season as the previous season's wooden spooners, the Sharks finished the regular season in 6th place to reach the finals, winning their first play-off match but losing their second to eventual premiers North Queensland Cowboys and being knocked out of contention.

== Ladder ==
2015 NRL season
Pos	Team	Pld	W	D	L	B	PF	PA	PD	Pts
1	Sydney Roosters	24	18	0	6	2	591	300	+291	40
2	Brisbane Broncos	24	17	0	7	2	574	379	+195	38
3	North Queensland Cowboys (P)	24	17	0	7	2	587	454	+133	38
4	Melbourne Storm	24	14	0	10	2	467	348	+119	32
5	Canterbury-Bankstown Bulldogs	24	14	0	10	2	522	480	+42	32
6	Cronulla-Sutherland Sharks	24	14	0	10	2	469	476	−7	32
7	South Sydney Rabbitohs	24	13	0	11	2	465	467	−2	30
8	St. George Illawarra Dragons	24	12	0	12	2	435	408	+27	28
9	Manly-Warringah Sea Eagles	24	11	0	13	2	458	492	−34	26
10	Canberra Raiders	24	10	0	14	2	577	569	+8	24
11	Penrith Panthers	24	9	0	15	2	399	477	−78	22
12	Parramatta Eels	24	9	0	15	2	448	573	−125	22
13	New Zealand Warriors	24	9	0	15	2	445	588	−143	22
14	Gold Coast Titans	24	9	0	15	2	439	636	−197	22
15	Wests Tigers	24	8	0	16	2	487	562	−75	20
16	Newcastle Knights	24	8	0	16	2	458	612	−154	20

== Results ==
- Round 1 - Cronulla Sharks vs Canberra Raiders (20 - 24)

 Tries: Anthony Tupou, Sosaia Feki, Ricky Leutele[1]

- Round 2 - Cronulla Sharks vs Brisbane Broncos (2 - 10)

 Tries: No Tries

- Round 3 - Melbourne Storm vs Cronulla Sharks (36 - 18)

 Tries: Jeff Robson, Valentine Holmes, Andrew Fifita

- Round 4 - Cronulla Sharks vs Gold Coast Titans (22 - 24)

 Tries: Valentine Holmes (2), Michael Ennis

- Round 5 - Sydney Roosters vs Cronulla Sharks (12 - 20)

 Tries: Jack Bird (2), Valentine Holmes, Luke Lewis

- Round 6 - Cronulla Sharks vs Newcastle Knights (22 - 6)

 Tries: Jack Bird, Luke Lewis, Ben Barba, Chris Heighington

- Round 7 - Cronulla Sharks vs South Sydney Rabbitohs (18 - 10)

 Tries: Michael Gordon, Luke Lewis, Jayson Bukuya

- Round 8 - Penrith Panthers vs Cronulla Sharks (26 - 18)

 Tries: Sosaia Feki, Ricky Leutele, Valentine Holmes

- Round 9 - Cronulla Sharks vs New Zealand Warriors (16 - 20)

 Tries: Luke Lewis, Andrew Fifita

- Round 10 - Gold Coast Titans vs Cronulla Sharks (22 - 23)

 Tries: Valentine Holmes (2), Luke Lewis, Jack Bird
 Field Goal: Valentine Holmes

- Round 12 - St George Illawarra Dragons vs Cronulla Sharks (42 - 6)

 Tries: Valentine Holmes

- Round 13 - Cronulla Sharks vs Sydney Roosters (10 - 4)

 Tries: Luke Lewis

- Round 15 - Newcastle Knights vs Cronulla Sharks (28 - 30)

 Tries: Jack Bird (2), Valentine Holmes, Luke Lewis, Ben Barba

- Round 16 - North Queensland Cowboys vs Cronulla Sharks (18 - 24)

 Tries: Luke Lewis, Sam Tagataese, Andrew Fifita, Ricky Leutele

- Round 17 - Manly Sea Eagles vs Cronulla Sharks (28 - 16)

 Tries: Andrew Fifita (2), Sosaia Feki

- Round 18 - Cronulla Sharks vs St George Illawarra Dragons (28 - 8)

 Tries: Sosaia Feki, Luke Lewis, Valentine Holmes, Andrew Fifita, Ben Barba

- Round 19 - Canberra Raiders vs Cronulla Sharks (20 - 21)

 Tries: Valentine Holmes, Ricky Leutele, Andrew Fifita
 Field Goal: Valentine Holmes

- Round 20 - Canterbury Bulldogs vs Cronulla Sharks (16 - 18)

 Tries: Michael Gordon, Paul Gallen, Valentine Holmes

- Round 21 - New Zealand Warriors vs Cronulla Sharks (14 - 18)

 Tries: Valentine Holmes (2), Ricky Leutele

- Round 22 - Cronulla Sharks vs North Queensland Cowboys (30 - 18)

 Tries: Ricky Leutele, Jack Bird, Michael Gordon, Gerard Beale, Wade Graham

- Round 23 - Cronulla Sharks vs Melbourne Storm (2 - 30)

 Tries: No Tries

- Round 24 - Cronulla Sharks vs Wests Tigers (40 - 18)

 Tries: Valentine Holmes (2), Luke Lewis, Sosaia Feki, Michael Ennis, Wade Graham, Michael Gordon

- Round 25 - Parramatta Eels vs Cronulla Sharks (28 - 35)

 Tries: Sosaia Feki (2), Ricky Leutele, Luke Lewis, Jayson Bukuya, Michael Ennis
 Field Goal: Valentine Holmes

- Round 26 - Cronulla Sharks vs Manly Sea Eagles (12 - 14)

 Tries: Wade Graham, Gerard Beale

- Week 1 Finals - Cronulla Sharks vs South Sydney Rabbitohs (28 - 12)

 Tries: Jack Bird, Wade Graham, Anthony Tupou, Sam Tagataese

- Week 2 Finals - North Queensland Cowboys vs Cronulla Sharks (39 - 0)

 Tries: No Tries

Qualifying and elimination finals
11 Sept, Sydney Football Stadium
1	Sydney Roosters	18
4	Melbourne	20
12 Sept, Stadium Australia
5	Canterbury	11
8	St. George Illawarra	10
13 Sept, Sydney Football Stadium
6	Cronulla	28
7	Souths	12
12 Sept, Lang Park
2	Brisbane	16
3	North Queensland	12

Semi-finals
18 Sept, Sydney Football Stadium
Sydney Roosters	38
Canterbury	12
19 Sept, Willows Sports Complex
North Queensland	39
Cronulla	0

Preliminary finals
26 Sept, Melbourne Rectangular Stadium
Melbourne	12
North Queensland	32
25 Sept, Lang Park
Brisbane	31
Sydney Roosters	12

Grand final
4 Oct, Stadium Australia
Brisbane	16
North Queensland	17
