= 2015 Canterbury-Bankstown Bulldogs season =

Canterbury-Bankstown Bulldogs
- 2015 season
- CEO: Raelene Castle
- Head coach: Des Hasler
- Captain: James Graham
- NRL: 5th (Semi- Finalists)
- Holden Cup: 10th
- NSW Cup: 5th
- Top try scorer: Club: Curtis Rona (23)
- Top points scorer: Club: Trent Hodkinson (99)
- Highest home attendance: 40,523
- Lowest home attendance: 11,021
- Average home attendance: 20,126

The 2015 Canterbury-Bankstown Bulldogs season is the 81st in the club's history. Coached by Des Hasler and captained by James Graham, who replaces Michael Ennis after his departure from the club. They will compete in the National Rugby League's 2015 Telstra Premiership. After finishing the 2014 season as the runners up, the team will be aiming to go one step further and win the premiership this year.

== Fixtures ==
=== Regular season ===
The Bulldogs will begin the regular season with an away match against the Penrith Panthers on March 8. They will host their first home game against the Parramatta Eels the following week on March 13.

The Club's 80th anniversary will be celebrated with a return to Belmore Sports Ground on July 26 in a match against the Cronulla Sharks.

Round	Home	Score	Away	Match Information
Round	Home	Score	Away	Date and Time	Venue	Crowd
1	Penrith Panthers	24-18	Canterbury Bankstown Bulldogs	Sun 8 Mar 2015, 4:00 pm AEDT	Pepper Stadium	18,814
2	Canterbury Bankstown Bulldogs	32-12	Parramatta Eels	Fri 17 Mar 2015, 7:35 pm AEDT	ANZ Stadium	28,876
3	Manly-Warringah Sea Eagles	12-16	Canterbury Bankstown Bulldogs	Fri 20 Mar 2015, 7:35 pm AEDT	Brookvale Oval	10,498
4	Wests Tigers	24-25	Canterbury Bankstown Bulldogs	Fri 27 Mar 2015, 7:35 pm AEDT	ANZ Stadium	20,121
5	Canterbury Bankstown Bulldogs	17-18	South Sydney Rabbitohs	Fri 3 Apr 2015, 4:00 pm AEDT	ANZ Stadium	40,523
6	St. George Illawarra Dragons	31-6	Canterbury Bankstown Bulldogs	Sun 12 Apr 2015, 4:00 pm AEST	ANZ Stadium	20,273
7	Canterbury Bankstown Bulldogs	28-16	Manly-Warringah Sea Eagles	Fri 17 Apr 2015, 7:35 pm AEST	ANZ Stadium	13,568
8	Canterbury Bankstown Bulldogs	14-38	Wests Tigers	Fri 24 Apr 2015, 7:45 pm AEST	ANZ Stadium	18,521
9	North Queensland Cowboys	23-16	Canterbury Bankstown Bulldogs	Fri 9 May 2015, 7:30 pm AEST	1300 Smiles Stadium	15,794
10	Canterbury Bankstown Bulldogs	10-24	Sydney Roosters	Fri 15 May 2015, 7:35 pm AEST	ANZ Stadium	17,093
11	Canberra Raiders	34-41	Canterbury Bankstown Bulldogs	Sun 24 May 2015, 4:00 pm AEST	GIO Stadium	12,221
12		BYE
13	Canterbury Bankstown Bulldogs	29-16	St. George Illawarra Dragons	Mon 8 Jun 2015, 4:00 pm AEST	ANZ Stadium	27, 291
14	Gold Coast Titans	28-14	Canterbury Bankstown Bulldogs	Sun 14 Jun 2015, 4:00 pm AEST	Robina Stadium	10,645
15	Canterbury Bankstown Bulldogs	24-12	Penrith Panthers	Sat 20 Jun 2015, 7:30 pm AEST	ANZ Stadium	12,476
16	Canterbury Bankstown Bulldogs	20-4	Melbourne Storm	Mon 29 Jun 2015, 7:00 pm AEST	Belmore Sports Ground	16,764
17		BYE
18	Canterbury Bankstown Bulldogs	8-16	Brisbane Broncos	Sat 11 Jul 2015, 7:30 pm AEST	ANZ Stadium	16,253
19	Parramatta Eels	4-28	Canterbury Bankstown Bulldogs	Fri 17 Jul 2015, 7:35 pm AEST	ANZ Stadium	17,082
20	Canterbury Bankstown Bulldogs	16-18	Cronulla Sharks	Sun 26 Jul 2015, 4:00 pm AEST	Belmore Sports Ground	19,005
21	Sydney Roosters	38-28	Canterbury Bankstown Bulldogs	Fri 31 Jul 2015, 7:45 pm AEST	Sydney Football Stadium	13,589
22	Brisbane Broncos	16-18	Canterbury Bankstown Bulldogs	Fri 7 Aug 2015, 7:45 pm AEST	Suncorp Stadium	34,082
23	Canterbury Bankstown Bulldogs	36-14	Gold Coast Titans	Sun 16 Aug 2015, 4:00 pm AEST	Central Coast Stadium	11,021
24	South Sydney Rabbitohs	18-32	Canterbury Bankstown Bulldogs	Fri 21 Aug 2015, 7:45 pm AEST	ANZ Stadium	26,503
25	Newcastle Knights	18-20	Canterbury Bankstown Bulldogs	Sat 29 Aug 2015, 5:30 pm AEST	Hunter Stadium	23,604
26	Canterbury-Bankstown Bulldogs	26-22	Warriors	Sun 6 Sep 2015, 6:30 pm AEST	ANZ Stadium	14,821
Legend: Win Loss Draw Bye

=== Finals ===
Round	Home	Score	Away	Match Information
Round	Home	Score	Away	Date and Time	Venue	Crowd
Finals Wk 1	Canterbury-Bankstown Bulldogs	11-10	St. George Illawarra Dragons	Sat 12 Sep 2015, 5:50 pm AEST	ANZ Stadium	33,854
Finals Wk 2	Sydney Roosters	36 - 12	Canterbury Bankstown Bulldogs	Fri 18 Sep 2015, 7:55 pm AEST	Sydney Football Stadium	35,711
Legend: Win Loss Draw Bye

Qualifying and elimination finals
11 Sept, Sydney Football Stadium
1	Sydney Roosters	18
4	Melbourne	20
12 Sept, Stadium Australia
5	Canterbury	11
8	St. George Illawarra	10
13 Sept, Sydney Football Stadium
6	Cronulla	28
7	Souths	12
12 Sept, Lang Park
2	Brisbane	16
3	North Queensland	12

Semi-finals
18 Sept, Sydney Football Stadium
Sydney Roosters	38
Canterbury	12
19 Sept, Willows Sports Complex
North Queensland	39
Cronulla	0

Preliminary finals
26 Sept, Melbourne Rectangular Stadium
Melbourne	12
North Queensland	32
25 Sept, Lang Park
Brisbane	31
Sydney Roosters	12

Grand final
4 Oct, Stadium Australia
Brisbane	16
North Queensland	17

== Ladder ==
2015 NRL season
Pos	Team	Pld	W	D	L	B	PF	PA	PD	Pts
1	Sydney Roosters	24	18	0	6	2	591	300	+291	40
2	Brisbane Broncos	24	17	0	7	2	574	379	+195	38
3	North Queensland Cowboys (P)	24	17	0	7	2	587	454	+133	38
4	Melbourne Storm	24	14	0	10	2	467	348	+119	32
5	Canterbury-Bankstown Bulldogs	24	14	0	10	2	522	480	+42	32
6	Cronulla-Sutherland Sharks	24	14	0	10	2	469	476	−7	32
7	South Sydney Rabbitohs	24	13	0	11	2	465	467	−2	30
8	St. George Illawarra Dragons	24	12	0	12	2	435	408	+27	28
9	Manly-Warringah Sea Eagles	24	11	0	13	2	458	492	−34	26
10	Canberra Raiders	24	10	0	14	2	577	569	+8	24
11	Penrith Panthers	24	9	0	15	2	399	477	−78	22
12	Parramatta Eels	24	9	0	15	2	448	573	−125	22
13	New Zealand Warriors	24	9	0	15	2	445	588	−143	22
14	Gold Coast Titans	24	9	0	15	2	439	636	−197	22
15	Wests Tigers	24	8	0	16	2	487	562	−75	20
16	Newcastle Knights	24	8	0	16	2	458	612	−154	20

== See also ==
- List of Canterbury-Bankstown Bulldogs seasons
