= 2015 Canberra Raiders season =

- NRL Rank: 10th
- 2015 record: Wins: 10; draws: 0; losses: 14
- Points scored: For: 577; against: 569

Team information
- CEO: Don Furner Jr.
- Coach: Ricky Stuart
- Captain: Jarrod Croker
- Stadium: GIO Stadium - 25,000
- Avg. attendance: 9,629
- High attendance: 13,113 (vs Sea Eagles, round 23)

Top scorers
- Tries: Blake Austin (14)
- Goals: Jarrod Croker (94)
- Points: Jarrod Croker (236)
| ← 2014 | List of seasons | 2016 → |

The 2015 Canberra Raiders season was the 34th in the club's history. Coached by Ricky Stuart and captained by Jarrod Croker, they competed in the National Rugby League's 2015 Telstra Premiership.

== Ladder ==
2015 NRL season
| Pos | Team | Pld | W | D | L | B | PF | PA | PD | Pts |
|---|---|---|---|---|---|---|---|---|---|---|
| 1 | Sydney Roosters | 24 | 18 | 0 | 6 | 2 | 591 | 300 | +291 | 40 |
| 2 | Brisbane Broncos | 24 | 17 | 0 | 7 | 2 | 574 | 379 | +195 | 38 |
| 3 | North Queensland Cowboys (P) | 24 | 17 | 0 | 7 | 2 | 587 | 454 | +133 | 38 |
| 4 | Melbourne Storm | 24 | 14 | 0 | 10 | 2 | 467 | 348 | +119 | 32 |
| 5 | Canterbury-Bankstown Bulldogs | 24 | 14 | 0 | 10 | 2 | 522 | 480 | +42 | 32 |
| 6 | Cronulla-Sutherland Sharks | 24 | 14 | 0 | 10 | 2 | 469 | 476 | −7 | 32 |
| 7 | South Sydney Rabbitohs | 24 | 13 | 0 | 11 | 2 | 465 | 467 | −2 | 30 |
| 8 | St. George Illawarra Dragons | 24 | 12 | 0 | 12 | 2 | 435 | 408 | +27 | 28 |
| 9 | Manly-Warringah Sea Eagles | 24 | 11 | 0 | 13 | 2 | 458 | 492 | −34 | 26 |
| 10 | Canberra Raiders | 24 | 10 | 0 | 14 | 2 | 577 | 569 | +8 | 24 |
| 11 | Penrith Panthers | 24 | 9 | 0 | 15 | 2 | 399 | 477 | −78 | 22 |
| 12 | Parramatta Eels | 24 | 9 | 0 | 15 | 2 | 448 | 573 | −125 | 22 |
| 13 | New Zealand Warriors | 24 | 9 | 0 | 15 | 2 | 445 | 588 | −143 | 22 |
| 14 | Gold Coast Titans | 24 | 9 | 0 | 15 | 2 | 439 | 636 | −197 | 22 |
| 15 | Wests Tigers | 24 | 8 | 0 | 16 | 2 | 487 | 562 | −75 | 20 |
| 16 | Newcastle Knights | 24 | 8 | 0 | 16 | 2 | 458 | 612 | −154 | 20 |

== Squad List ==
Canberra Raiders
| NRL Squad | | | Coaching staff |
|---|---|---|---|
| Blake Austin – FE, HK, HB; Kurt Baptiste – HK, HB, FE; Shannon Boyd – PR; Glen Buttriss – HK, LK; Mitch Cornish – HB, FE, FB; Jarrod Croker (c) – CE, WG; Joel Edwards – SR, LK, PR; Shaun Fensom – LK, SR; Jeremy Hawkins – WG, CE; Josh Hodgson – HK | Jarrad Kennedy – SR, LK, CE; Brenko Lee – CE, WG; Edrick Lee – WG, CE; Josh McCrone – HK; Mark Nicholls – PR, SR, LK; Frank-Paul Nu'uausala – PR, SR, LK; Kyle O'Donnell – PR, SR, LK; Josh Papalii – SR, LK; Jordan Rapana – WG, FB, CE; David Shillington – PR | Iosia Soliola – CE, SR; Dane Tilse – PR; Bill Tupou – WG, CE; Paul Vaughan – PR, SR, LK; Sisa Waqa – WG; Jack Wighton – FB, CE, FE; Sam Williams – HB, FE | Head coach: Ricky Stuart; Assistant coaches: Dean Pay; Mick Crawley; Legend: (c) Captain(s); (vc) Vice-captain(s); Updated: 1 October 2014; Source(s): Raiders 2015 Squad |

=== Gains ===
| Player | Signed from | Until end of | Notes |
|---|---|---|---|
| Blake Austin | Wests Tigers | 2017 | |
| Josh Hodgson | Hull Kingston Rovers | 2016 | |
| Frank-Paul Nu'uausala | Sydney Roosters | 2017 | |
| Iosia Soliola | St. Helens | 2016 | |
| Sisa Waqa | Melbourne Storm | 2016 | |
| Sam Williams | Catalans Dragons | 2016 | |

=== Losses ===
| Player | Signed To | Until end of | Notes |
|---|---|---|---|
| Terry Campese | Hull Kingston Rovers | 2015 | |
| Jake Foster | Eastern Suburbs Tigers | | |
| Reece Robinson | Parramatta Eels | | |

== Fixtures ==
=== Preseason ===
==== NRL Auckland Nines ====
The NRL Auckland Nines is a pre-season rugby league nines competition featuring all 16 NRL clubs. The 2015 competition was played over two days on 31 January and 1 February at Eden Park. The Raiders feature in the Hunua Ranges pool and played the Tigers, Warriors and Titans.

| Pos | Team | Pld | W | D | L | PF | PA | PD | Pts |
|---|---|---|---|---|---|---|---|---|---|
| 1 | Wests Tigers | 3 | 2 | 0 | 1 | 50 | 32 | +18 | 4 |
| 2 | New Zealand Warriors | 3 | 2 | 0 | 1 | 58 | 41 | +17 | 4 |
| 3 | Gold Coast Titans | 3 | 1 | 0 | 2 | 48 | 56 | −8 | 2 |
| 4 | Canberra Raiders | 3 | 1 | 0 | 2 | 46 | 73 | −27 | 2 |

| Date | Time (Local) | Round | Opponent | Venue | Score | Tries | Goals |
|---|---|---|---|---|---|---|---|
| Saturday, 31 January | 2:20pm | Round 1 | Wests Tigers | Eden Park | 16-10 | Croker, Ahearn | Ahearn (1/1) |
| Saturday, 31 January | 6:40pm | Round 2 | New Zealand Warriors | Eden Park | 23-19 | Ahearn (Bonus point), Edwards, Pangai, Lee | Buttriss (1/1), Williams (1/1), Ahearn (1/1), Croker (0/1) |
| Sunday, 1 February | 1:15pm | Round 3 | Gold Coast Titans | Eden Park | 13-38 | | |
Legend: Win Loss Draw

=== Regular season ===
| Date | Round | Opponent | Venue | Score | Tries | Goals | Attendance |
|---|---|---|---|---|---|---|---|
| Sunday 8 March | 1 | Cronulla-Sutherland Sharks | Remondis Stadium | 24-20 | Wighton (2), Rapana, Waqa | Croker (3) | 11,096 |
| Sunday 15 March | 2 | New Zealand Warriors | GIO Stadium | 6-18 | Waqa | Croker (1) | 8,241 |
| Saturday 21 March | 3 | St George Illawarra Dragons | GIO Stadium | 20-22 | Hodgson, Soliola, Austin | Croker (3) | 11,774 |
| Sunday 29 March | 4 | Sydney Roosters | Allianz Stadium | 6-34 | Croker | Croker (1) | 9,852 |
| Saturday 4 April | 5 | Manly-Warringah Sea Eagles | Lavington Sports Ground | 29-16 | Waqa, Austin, Kennedy, Rapana, Croker | Croker (4/5), Williams (FG) | 6,436 |
| Sunday 12 April | 6 | Melbourne Storm | GIO Stadium | 10-14 | Hawkins | Croker (3) | 10,536 |
| Sunday 19 April | 7 | West Tigers | Leichhardt Oval | 30-22 | Boyd, Croker, Nuuausala, Wighton, Rapana | Croker (5/6) | 13,198 |
| Sunday 26 April | 8 | South Sydney Rabbitohs | Barlow Park | 30-22 | Rapana, E. Lee (2), Boyd, Papalii, Austin | Croker (3/7) | 8,713 |
| Saturday 9 May | 9 | Gold Coast Titans | GIO Stadium | 56-16 | Austin (2), Croker (2), Vaughan, Rapana, Papalii, Soliola, E. Lee, Williams | Croker (8/10) | 8,116 |
| Sunday 17 May | 10 | St George Illawarra Dragons | WIN Stadium | 18-32 | Soliola, Boyd, Papalii | Croker (3) | 13,102 |
| Sunday 24 May | 11 | Canterbury-Bankstown Bulldogs | GIO Stadium | 34-41 | Waqa (2), Fensom, Papalii, Austin, Cornish, | Croker (5/6) | 12,221 |
| Saturday 24 May | 12 | Brisbane Broncos | GIO Stadium | 12-24 | Austin, Kennedy | Croker (2) | 10,090 |
| Saturday 6 June 2015 | 13 | Newcastle Knights | Hunter Stadium | 44-22 | E. Lee (2), Austin (2), Wighton, Papalii, Croker | Croker (8/9) | 13,504 |
Bye
| Saturday 20 June | 15 | North Queensland Cowboys | GIO Stadium | 20-21 | E. Lee, Austin, Wighton | Croker (4) | 10,170 |
| Saturday 27 June | 16 | New Zealand Warriors | Mt Smart Stadium | 8-30 | Wighton | Croker (2) | 13,110 |
| | 17 | Bye | | | | | |
| Friday 10 July | 18 | Newcastle Knights | GIO Stadium | 36-22 | Austin (3), Papalii (2), Croker | Croker (6) | 6,015 |
| Saturday 18 July | 19 | Cronulla-Sutherland Sharks | GIO Stadium | 20-21 | E. Lee (2), Papalii | Croker (4/5) | 9,853 |
| Sunday 26 July | 20 | Penrith Panthers | Pepper Stadium | 34-24 | Rapana (2), Vaughan (2), Fensom, E. Lee | Croker (5/6) | 8,048 |
| Sunday 1 August | 21 | North Queensland Cowboys | 1300SMILES Stadium | 24-32 | Wighton, E. Lee, Soliola, Baptiste | Croker (3/4) | 16,207 |
| Monday 10 August | 22 | West Tigers | GIO Stadium | 18-20 | Boyd (2), Croker | Croker (3) | 8,704 |
| Sunday 16 August | 23 | Manly-Warringah Sea Eagles | GIO Stadium | 24-26 | Austin, Kennedy, Vaughan | Croker (4) | 13,113 |
| Sunday 23 August | 24 | Gold Coast Titans | Cbus Super StadiumE. Lee | 12-28 | Croker, Williams | Croker (2) | 8,762 |
| Monday 31 August | 25 | Penrith Panthers | GIO Stadium | 34-18 | Baptiste, Croker, Fensom, Kennedy, Waqa, Williams | Croker (5/6) | 6,717 |
| Sunday 6 September | 26 | Parramatta Eels | Pirtek Stadium | 28-24 | Croker (2), Hodgson, B. Lee, E. Lee | Croker (4/5) | 10,515 |

== Statistics ==
| Name | App | T | G | FG | Pts |
|---|---|---|---|---|---|
| Blake Austin | 23 | 14 | - | - | 56 |
| Kurt Baptiste | 16 | 2 | - | - | 8 |
| Mitchell Barnett | 2 | - | - | - | 0 |
| Luke Bateman | 6 | - | - | - | 0 |
| Shannon Boyd | 20 | 5 | - | - | 20 |
| Glen Buttriss | 3 | - | - | - | 0 |
| Mitch Cornish | 7 | 1 | - | - | 4 |
| Jarrod Croker | 24 | 12 | 94 | - | 236 |
| Shaun Fensom | 23 | 3 | - | - | 12 |
| Jeremy Hawkins | 4 | 1 | - | - | 4 |
| Josh Hodgson | 24 | 2 | - | - | 8 |
| Jarrad Kennedy | 23 | 4 | - | - | 16 |
| Brenko Lee | 2 | 1 | - | - | 4 |
| Edrick Lee | 23 | 12 | - | - | 48 |
| Joseph Leilua | 6 | - | - | - | 0 |
| Josh McCrone | 4 | - | - | - | 0 |
| Mark Nicholls | 5 | - | - | - | 0 |
| Frank-Paul Nu'uausala | 24 | 1 | - | - | 4 |
| Josh Papalii | 24 | 8 | - | - | 32 |
| Jordan Rapana | 20 | 7 | - | - | 28 |
| David Shillington | 15 | - | - | - | 0 |
| Iosia Soliola | 19 | 4 | - | - | 16 |
| Dane Tilse | 6 | - | - | - | 0 |
| Bill Tupou | 1 | - | - | - | 0 |
| Paul Vaughan | 24 | 4 | - | - | 16 |
| Sisa Waqa | 21 | 6 | - | - | 24 |
| Jack Wighton | 20 | 7 | - | - | 28 |
| Sam Williams | 16 | 3 | - | 1 | 13 |
