= 2015 NRL season =

108th season of professional rugby league in Australia

2015 National Rugby League
- Duration: March 5 – October 4, 2015
- Teams: 16
- Premiers: North Queensland Cowboys (1st title)
- Minor premiers: Sydney Roosters (19th title)
- Matches played: 201
- Points scored: 8157
- Average attendance: 16,074
- Total attendance: 3,230,867
- Top points scorer: Jarrod Croker (236)
- Wooden spoon: Newcastle Knights (2nd spoon)
- Dally M Medal: Johnathan Thurston
- Top try-scorer: Semi Radradra (24)

The 2015 NRL season was the 108th season of professional rugby league in Australia and the 18th season of the National Rugby League in Australia and New Zealand. The season started in New Zealand with the annual Auckland Nines, which was followed by the Rugby League All Stars Match, returning after a one-year hiatus, and the World Club Series. North Queensland Cowboys won their first premiership in only the second Grand Final to be decided in extra time and their second ever grand final.

== Season launch and advertising ==
The season launched with a gala event at the Queens Wharf, Auckland on 29 January attended by a selection of the code's stars, including Shaun Johnson and Greg Inglis. It was the first time the event had been held outside Australia.

The NRL and their longstanding ad agency MJW Haukuhodo used, for the second year running, Robbie Williams' "Let Me Entertain You" as the commercial soundtrack. The launch commercial takes members and supporters on a journey from the outback plains of Western Queensland to an inner city boot camp in Sydney and features more than fifty NRL club members and fans in a range of scenarios that include a rendition of a Haka on a Sydney train and a focus on Greg Inglis' trademark Goanna post-try celebration.

The second Sunday afternoon match began at 4:10 pm instead of the traditional 3:10 pm. This change was to allow the Nine Network to show the match live in New South Wales and Queensland, and use it as a lead-in to their respective 6:00 pm news bulletins.

== Teams ==
The lineup of teams remained unchanged for the 9th consecutive year. The NRL's salary cap for the clubs' top 25 players will be $A6.3M for 2015.

Colours	Club	Season	Home ground(s)	Head coach	Captain(s)
	Brisbane Broncos	28th season	Suncorp Stadium	Wayne Bennett	Justin Hodges
	Canberra Raiders	34th season	GIO Stadium Canberra	Ricky Stuart	Jarrod Croker
	Canterbury-Bankstown Bulldogs	81st season	ANZ Stadium & Belmore Sports Ground	Des Hasler	James Graham
	Cronulla-Sutherland Sharks	49th season	Remondis Stadium	Shane Flanagan	Paul Gallen
	Gold Coast Titans	9th season	Cbus Super Stadium	Neil Henry	Nate Myles
	Manly Warringah Sea Eagles	66th season	Brookvale Oval	Geoff Toovey	Jamie Lyon
	Melbourne Storm	18th season	AAMI Park	Craig Bellamy	Cameron Smith
	Newcastle Knights	28th season	Hunter Stadium	Rick Stone→Danny Buderus (interim)	Kurt Gidley
	New Zealand Warriors	21st season	Mt. Smart Stadium	Andrew McFadden	Simon Mannering
	North Queensland Cowboys	21st season	1300SMILES Stadium	Paul Green	Johnathan Thurston & Matt Scott
	Parramatta Eels	69th season	Pirtek Stadium	Brad Arthur	Tim Mannah
	Penrith Panthers	49th season	Pepper Stadium	Ivan Cleary	Peter Wallace
	South Sydney Rabbitohs	106th season	ANZ Stadium	Michael Maguire	Greg Inglis
	St. George Illawarra Dragons	17th season	WIN Jubilee Oval & WIN Stadium	Paul McGregor	Ben Creagh
	Sydney Roosters	108th season	Allianz Stadium	Trent Robinson	Mitchell Pearce & Jake Friend
	Wests Tigers	16th season	Campbelltown Stadium & Leichhardt Oval	Jason Taylor	Robbie Farah

== Pre-season ==
The 2015 pre-season featured the second Auckland Nines tournament, held over a weekend at Auckland's Eden Park in which the South Sydney Rabbitohs defeated the Cronulla-Sutherland Sharks in the final. This tournament took place on the last weekend of January, and the All Stars match was played on Friday 13 February at Cbus Super Stadium in Robina. The 2015 World Club Series took place in England with 2014 premiers the South Sydney Rabbitohs taking on Super League champions St. Helens in the showpiece match, which South Sydney won.

== Regular season ==
Team	1	2	3	4	5	6	7	8	9	10	11	12	13	14	15	16	17	18	19	20	21	22	23	24	25	26	F1	F2	F3	GF
Brisbane Broncos	SOU; 30	**CRO**; **8**	NQL; 22	**NZL**; **8**	**GCT**; **10**	SYD; 4	**SGI**; **2**	PAR; 12	PEN; 3	**NQL**; **11**	**NEW**; **13**	**CAN**; **12**	MAN; 34	X	**MEL**; **2**	NEW; 22	X	**CBY**; **8**	WTI; 26	GCT; 34	**MAN**; **30**	CBY; 2	SGI; 26	**SYD**; **2**	**SOU**; **35**	MEL; 7	NQL; 4	X	SYD; 19	NQL; 1
Canberra Raiders	**CRO**; **4**	NZL; 12	SGI; 2	**SYD**; **28**	**MAN**; **13**	MEL; 4	**WTI**; **8**	**SOU**; **8**	GCT; 40	**SGI**; **14**	CBY; 7	BRI; 12	**NEW**; **22**	X	NQL; 1	**NZL**; **22**	X	NEW; 14	CRO; 1	**PEN**; **10**	**NQL**; **8**	WTI; 2	MAN; 2	**GCT**; **16**	PEN; 16	**PAR**; **4**				
Canterbury-Bankstown Bulldogs	**PEN**; **6**	PAR; 20	**MAN**; **4**	**WTI**; **1**	SOU; 1	**SGI**; **25**	MAN; 12	WTI; 24	**NQL**; **7**	SYD; 14	**CAN**; **7**	X	SGI; 13	**GCT**; **14**	PEN; 12	MEL; 16	X	BRI; 8	**PAR**; **24**	CRO; 2	**SYD**; **10**	**BRI**; **2**	GCT; 22	**SOU**; **14**	**NEW**; **2**	NZL; 4	SGI; 1	**SYD**; **26**		
Cronulla-Sutherland Sharks	CAN; 4	BRI; 8	**MEL**; **18**	GCT; 2	**SYD**; **8**	NEW; 16	SOU; 8	**PEN**; **8**	NZL; 4	**GCT**; **1**	X	**SGI**; **36**	SYD; 6	X	**NEW**; **2**	**NQL**; **6**	**MAN**; **12**	SGI; 20	**CAN**; **1**	**CBY**; **2**	**NZL**; **4**	NQL; 12	MEL; 28	WTI; 22	**PAR**; **7**	MAN; 2	SOU; 16	**NQL**; **39**		
Gold Coast Titans	WTI; 1	**PEN**; **40**	NEW; 2	**CRO**; **2**	BRI; 10	**PAR**; **22**	PEN; 26	**NZL**; **4**	**CAN**; **40**	CRO; 1	X	SOU; 6	**WTI**; **7**	CBY; 14	NZL; 22	**SYD**; **10**	X	MAN; 32	**NEW**; **28**	**BRI**; **34**	PAR; 10	**MEL**; **22**	**CBY**; **22**	CAN; 16	SGI; 2	**NQL**; **30**				
Manly Warringah Sea Eagles	**PAR**; **30**	MEL; 2	CBY; 4	**SGI**; **8**	CAN; 13	**PEN**; **10**	**CBY**; **12**	**MEL**; **2**	NEW; 20	PEN; 1	X	**NQL**; **4**	**BRI**; **34**	X	WTI; 10	**SOU**; **12**	CRO; 12	**GCT**; **32**	NQL; 18	**NZL**; **20**	BRI; 30	SOU; 20	**CAN**; **2**	PAR; 4	SYD; 36	**CRO**; **2**				
Melbourne Storm	**SGI**; **8**	**MAN**; **2**	CRO; 18	**NQL**; **1**	NZL; 16	**CAN**; **4**	SYD; 1	MAN; 2	**PAR**; **18**	SOU; 4	X	**SYD**; **22**	**PEN**; **20**	PAR; 4	BRI; 2	**CBY**; **16**	X	**NZL**; **14**	PEN; 42	SGI; 18	**WTI**; **18**	GCT; 22	**CRO**; **28**	NEW; 14	NQL; 8	**BRI**; **7**	**SYD**; **2**	X	NQL; 20	
Newcastle Knights	NZL; 10	**NQL**; **2**	**GCT**; **2**	PEN; 12	SGI; 13	**CRO**; **16**	PAR; 6	NQL; 2	**MAN**; **20**	WTI; 10	BRI; 13	**NZL**; **4**	CAN; 22	X	CRO; 2	**BRI**; **22**	X	**CAN**; **14**	GCT; 28	**SOU**; **46**	**SGI**; **22**	SYD; 16	**WTI**; **6**	**MEL**; **14**	CBY; 2	**PEN**; **18**				
New Zealand Warriors	**NEW**; **10**	**CAN**; **12**	PAR; 13	BRI; 8	**MEL**; **16**	WTI; 10	**NQL**; **4**	GCT; 4	**CRO**; **4**	**PAR**; **4**	X	NEW; 4	**SOU**; **32**	SYD; 4	**GCT**; **22**	CAN; 22	X	MEL; 14	**SYD**; **24**	MAN; 20	CRO; 4	SGI; 36	**PEN**; **14**	NQL; 34	**WTI**; **34**	**CBY**; **4**				
North Queensland Cowboys	SYD; 24	NEW; 2	**BRI**; **22**	MEL; 1	**PEN**; **20**	**SOU**; **18**	NZL; 4	**NEW**; **2**	CBY; 7	BRI; 11	**WTI**; **8**	MAN; 4	**PAR**; **6**	X	**CAN**; **1**	CRO; 6	**SGI**; **6**	X	**MAN**; **18**	PAR; 42	CAN; 8	**CRO**; **12**	SOU; 13	**NZL**; **34**	**MEL**; **8**	GCT; 30	**BRI**; **4**	CRO; 39	**MEL**; **20**	BRI; 1
Parramatta Eels	MAN; 30	**CBY**; **20**	**NZL**; **13**	SOU; 13	WTI; 16	GCT; 22	**NEW**; **6**	**BRI**; **12**	MEL; 18	NZL; 4	**SOU**; **2**	**PEN**; **6**	NQL; 6	**MEL**; **4**	X	SGI; 4	**WTI**; **12**	X	CBY; 24	**NQL**; **42**	**GCT**; **10**	PEN; 6	**SYD**; **10**	**MAN**; **4**	CRO; 7	CAN; 4				
Penrith Panthers	CBY; 6	GCT; 40	**SYD**; **8**	**NEW**; **12**	NQL; 20	MAN; 10	**GCT**; **26**	CRO; 8	**BRI**; **3**	**MAN**; **1**	X	PAR; 6	MEL; 20	X	**CBY**; **12**	**WTI**; **23**	SOU; 14	SYD; 20	**MEL**; **42**	CAN; 10	**SOU**; **4**	**PAR**; **6**	NZL; 14	**SGI**; **7**	**CAN**; **16**	NEW; 18				
South Sydney Rabbitohs	**BRI**; **30**	SYD; 8	WTI; 14	**PAR**; **13**	**CBY**; **1**	NQL; 18	**CRO**; **8**	CAN; 8	SGI; 6	**MEL**; **4**	PAR; 2	**GCT**; **6**	NZL; 32	**WTI**; **28**	X	MAN; 12	**PEN**; **14**	X	**SGI**; **16**	NEW; 46	PEN; 4	**MAN**; **20**	**NQL**; **13**	CBY; 14	BRI; 35	**SYD**; **30**	**CRO**; **16**			
St. George Illawarra Dragons	MEL; 8	**WTI**; **18**	**CAN**; **2**	MAN; 8	**NEW**; **13**	CBY; 25	BRI; 2	**SYD**; **2**	**SOU**; **6**	CAN; 14	X	CRO; 36	**CBY**; **13**	X	SYD; 5	**PAR**; **4**	NQL; 6	**CRO**; **20**	SOU; 16	**MEL**; **18**	NEW; 22	**NZL**; **36**	**BRI**; **26**	PEN; 7	**GCT**; **2**	WTI; 2	**CBY**; **1**			
Sydney Roosters	**NQL**; **24**	**SOU**; **8**	PEN; 8	CAN; 28	CRO; 8	**BRI**; **4**	**MEL**; **1**	SGI; 2	WTI; 32	**CBY**; **14**	X	MEL; 22	**CRO**; **6**	**NZL**; **4**	**SGI**; **5**	GCT; 10	X	**PEN**; **20**	NZL; 24	**WTI**; **25**	CBY; 10	**NEW**; **16**	PAR; 10	BRI; 2	**MAN**; **36**	SOU; 30	MEL; 2	CBY; 26	**BRI**; **19**	
Wests Tigers	**GCT**; **1**	SGI; 18	**SOU**; **14**	CBY; 1	**PAR**; **16**	**NZL**; **10**	CAN; 8	**CBY**; **24**	**SYD**; **32**	**NEW**; **10**	NQL; 8	X	GCT; 7	SOU; 28	**MAN**; **10**	PEN; 23	PAR; 12	X	**BRI**; **26**	SYD; 25	MEL; 18	**CAN**; **2**	NEW; 6	**CRO**; **22**	NZL; 34	**SGI**; **2**				
Team	1	2	3	4	5	6	7	8	9	10	11	12	13	14	15	16	17	18	19	20	21	22	23	24	25	26	F1	F2	F3	GF

Bold – Opposition's Home game
X – Bye
Opponent for round listed above margin

== Ladder ==
2015 NRL season
Pos	Team	Pld	W	D	L	B	PF	PA	PD	Pts
1	Sydney Roosters	24	18	0	6	2	591	300	+291	40
2	Brisbane Broncos	24	17	0	7	2	574	379	+195	38
3	North Queensland Cowboys (P)	24	17	0	7	2	587	454	+133	38
4	Melbourne Storm	24	14	0	10	2	467	348	+119	32
5	Canterbury-Bankstown Bulldogs	24	14	0	10	2	522	480	+42	32
6	Cronulla-Sutherland Sharks	24	14	0	10	2	469	476	−7	32
7	South Sydney Rabbitohs	24	13	0	11	2	465	467	−2	30
8	St. George Illawarra Dragons	24	12	0	12	2	435	408	+27	28
9	Manly-Warringah Sea Eagles	24	11	0	13	2	458	492	−34	26
10	Canberra Raiders	24	10	0	14	2	577	569	+8	24
11	Penrith Panthers	24	9	0	15	2	399	477	−78	22
12	Parramatta Eels	24	9	0	15	2	448	573	−125	22
13	New Zealand Warriors	24	9	0	15	2	445	588	−143	22
14	Gold Coast Titans	24	9	0	15	2	439	636	−197	22
15	Wests Tigers	24	8	0	16	2	487	562	−75	20
16	Newcastle Knights	24	8	0	16	2	458	612	−154	20

=== Ladder progression ===
- Numbers highlighted in green indicate that the team finished the round inside the top 8.
- Numbers highlighted in blue indicates the team finished first on the ladder in that round.
- Numbers highlighted in red indicates the team finished last place on the ladder in that round.
- Underlined numbers indicate that the team had a bye during that round.

	Team	1	2	3	4	5	6	7	8	9	10	11	12	13	14	15	16	17	18	19	20	21	22	23	24	25	26
1	Sydney	2	2	4	6	6	6	6	6	8	10	12	14	14	16	18	20	22	24	26	28	30	32	34	36	38	40
2	Brisbane	0	2	4	6	8	10	10	12	14	14	16	18	20	22	24	26	28	30	32	34	34	34	36	36	38	38
3	North Queensland (P)	0	0	0	2	4	6	8	10	12	14	16	18	20	22	24	24	26	28	30	32	34	34	34	36	36	38
4	Melbourne	2	2	4	4	6	8	10	10	12	14	16	16	18	18	18	18	20	20	22	24	24	26	28	28	30	32
5	Canterbury-Bankstown	0	2	4	6	6	6	8	8	8	8	10	12	14	14	16	18	20	20	22	22	22	24	26	28	30	32
6	Cronulla-Sutherland	0	0	0	0	2	4	6	6	6	8	10	10	12	14	16	18	18	20	22	24	26	28	28	30	32	32
7	South Sydney	2	4	6	6	8	8	8	8	10	10	12	14	16	16	18	20	20	22	24	26	28	28	30	30	30	30
8	St. George Illawarra	0	0	2	4	6	8	10	12	12	14	16	18	18	20	20	20	20	20	20	20	22	24	24	26	26	28
9	Manly-Warringah	0	2	2	2	2	2	2	4	6	6	8	8	8	10	12	12	14	16	16	18	20	22	24	24	24	26
10	Canberra	2	2	2	2	4	4	6	8	10	10	10	10	12	14	14	14	16	18	18	20	20	20	20	20	22	24
11	Penrith	2	4	4	4	4	6	6	8	8	10	12	12	12	14	14	16	18	18	18	18	18	18	20	20	20	22
12	Parramatta	2	2	2	4	4	4	6	6	6	6	6	8	8	10	12	14	16	18	18	18	18	20	20	22	22	22
13	New Zealand	0	2	4	4	4	6	6	6	8	10	12	14	14	14	16	18	20	22	22	22	22	22	22	22	22	22
14	Gold Coast	0	0	0	2	2	4	6	8	8	8	10	10	12	14	14	14	16	16	16	16	18	18	18	20	22	22
15	Wests	2	4	4	4	6	6	6	8	8	8	8	10	10	12	12	12	12	14	14	14	16	18	18	18	20	20
16	Newcastle	2	4	6	8	8	8	8	8	8	10	10	10	10	12	12	12	14	14	16	16	16	16	18	20	20	20

== Finals series ==
A new record was set for overall attendance in Week 1 of the Finals with a combined total of 131,794.

Home	Score	Away	Match information
Home	Score	Away	Date and time (local)	Venue	Referees	Crowd
QUALIFYING & ELIMINATION FINALS
Sydney Roosters	18 – 20	Melbourne Storm	11 September 2015, 8:00 pm	Allianz Stadium	Ben Cummins; Alan Shortall	20,521
Canterbury Bankstown Bulldogs †	11 – 10	St. George Illawarra Dragons	12 September 2015, 5:55 pm	ANZ Stadium	Jared Maxwell; Gavin Morris	33,854
Brisbane Broncos	16 – 12	North Queensland Cowboys	12 September 2015, 8:00 pm	Suncorp Stadium	Gerard Sutton; Gavin Badger	50,388
Cronulla Sutherland Sharks	28 – 12	South Sydney Rabbitohs	13 September 2015, 4:10 pm	Allianz Stadium	Matt Cecchin; Ashley Klein	27,031
SEMI FINALS
Sydney Roosters	38 – 12	Canterbury Bankstown Bulldogs	18 September 2015, 7:55 pm	Allianz Stadium	Matt Cecchin; Ben Cummins	35,711
North Queensland Cowboys	39 – 0	Cronulla Sutherland Sharks	19 September 2015, 7:45 pm	1300SMILES Stadium	Gerard Sutton; Gavin Badger	21,683
PRELIMINARY FINALS
Brisbane Broncos	31 – 12	Sydney Roosters	25 September 2015, 8:00 pm	Suncorp Stadium	Gerard Sutton; Gavin Badger	51,826
Melbourne Storm	12 – 32	North Queensland Cowboys	26 September 2015, 7:45 pm	AAMI Park	Matt Cecchin; Ben Cummins	29,315

† Match decided in golden point extra time.

=== Chart ===
Qualifying and elimination finals
11 Sept, Allianz Stadium
1	Sydney	18
4	Melbourne	20
12 Sept, ANZ Stadium
5	Canterbury-Bankstown	11
8	St. George Illawarra	10
13 Sept, Allianz Stadium
6	Cronulla-Sutherland	28
7	South Sydney	12
12 Sept, Suncorp Stadium
2	Brisbane	16
3	North Queensland	12

Semi-finals
18 Sept, Allianz Stadium
Sydney	38
Canterbury-Bankstown	12
19 Sept, 1300SMILES Stadium
North Queensland	39
Cronulla-Sutherland	0

Preliminary finals
26 Sept, AAMI Park
Melbourne	12
North Queensland	32
25 Sept, Suncorp Stadium
Brisbane	31
Sydney	12

Grand final
4 Oct, ANZ Stadium
Brisbane	16
North Queensland	17

== Grand final ==
Sunday, 4 October
7:30pm AEDT

Brisbane Broncos	16 – 17 Golden Point	North Queensland Cowboys
Tries: Corey Oates (7') 1 Jack Reed (34') 1 Goals: Corey Parker 2/2 (6' pen, 9'); Jordan Kahu 2/2 (35', 43' pen)	1st: 14 - 12; 2nd: 2 - 4 GP: 0 - 1	Tries: Justin O'Neill (10') 1 James Tamou (25') 1 Kyle Feldt (80') 1 Goals: Johnathan Thurston 2/3 (12', 26'); Field Goals: Johnathan Thurston (83') 1

ANZ Stadium
Attendance: 82,758
Clive Churchill Medalist: Johnathan Thurston
Referee: Gerard Sutton, Ben Cummins

== Regular season player statistics ==
The following statistics are of the conclusion of Round 26.

Top 5 point scorers

Points	Player	Tries	Goals	Field Goals
236	Jarrod Croker	12	94	0
226	James Maloney	9	94	2
197	Pat Richards	17	64	1
176	Johnathan Thurston	3	80	4
176	Gareth Widdop	9	70	0

Top 5 try scorers

Tries	Player
24	Semi Radradra
22	Curtis Rona
17	Alex Johnston
17	Pat Richards
17	James Tedesco

Top 5 goal scorers

Goals	Player
94	James Maloney
94	Jarrod Croker
80	Johnathan Thurston
70	Gareth Widdop
68	Michael Gordon

Top 5 tacklers

Tackles	Player
1,140	Andrew McCullough
1,092	Simon Mannering
1,034	Cameron Smith
1,024	Shaun Fensom
965	Elijah Taylor

== 2015 Transfers ==
=== Players ===
Player	2014 Club	2015 Club
Ben Barba	Brisbane Broncos	Cronulla-Sutherland Sharks
David Hala	Brisbane Broncos	Gold Coast Titans
Ben Hannant	Brisbane Broncos	North Queensland Cowboys
Josh Hoffman	Brisbane Broncos	Gold Coast Titans
Martin Kennedy	Brisbane Broncos	Suspension
Todd Lowrie	Brisbane Broncos	Retirement
Terry Campese	Canberra Raiders	Super League: Hull Kingston Rovers
Tom Learoyd-Lahrs	Canberra Raiders	Melbourne Storm
Anthony Milford	Canberra Raiders	Brisbane Broncos
Reece Robinson	Canberra Raiders	Parramatta Eels
Bill Tupou	Canberra Raiders	Super League: Wakefield Trinity Wildcats
Brett White	Canberra Raiders	Retirement
Mitch Brown	Canterbury-Bankstown Bulldogs	Cronulla-Sutherland Sharks
Michael Ennis	Canterbury-Bankstown Bulldogs	Cronulla-Sutherland Sharks
Dale Finucane	Canterbury-Bankstown Bulldogs	Melbourne Storm
Krisnan Inu	Canterbury-Bankstown Bulldogs	Stade Français (French rugby union)
Reni Maitua	Canterbury-Bankstown Bulldogs	Featherstone Rovers
Todd Carney	Cronulla-Sutherland Sharks	Super League: Catalans Dragons
Isaac De Gois	Cronulla-Sutherland Sharks	Parramatta Eels
Bryce Gibbs	Cronulla-Sutherland Sharks	Retirement
Daniel Holdsworth	Cronulla-Sutherland Sharks	Retirement
John Morris	Cronulla-Sutherland Sharks	Retirement
Beau Ryan	Cronulla-Sutherland Sharks	Retirement
Nathan Stapleton	Cronulla-Sutherland Sharks	N/A
Siosaia Vave	Cronulla-Sutherland Sharks	Manly Warringah Sea Eagles
Jonathan Wright	Cronulla-Sutherland Sharks	New Zealand Warriors
Luke Bailey	Gold Coast Titans	Retirement
Maurice Blair	Gold Coast Titans	Super League: Hull Kingston Rovers
Ashley Harrison	Gold Coast Titans	Retirement
Albert Kelly	Gold Coast Titans	Super League: Hull Kingston Rovers
Steve Michaels	Gold Coast Titans	Super League: Hull F.C.
Mark Minichiello	Gold Coast Titans	Super League: Hull F.C.
Brad Takairangi	Gold Coast Titans	Parramatta Eels
Daniel Harrison	Manly Warringah Sea Eagles	London Broncos
Jason King	Manly Warringah Sea Eagles	Retirement
Glenn Stewart	Manly Warringah Sea Eagles	South Sydney Rabbitohs
Anthony Watmough	Manly Warringah Sea Eagles	Parramatta Eels
Ryan Hoffman	Melbourne Storm	New Zealand Warriors
Junior Moors	Melbourne Storm	Super League: Castleford Tigers
Bryan Norrie	Melbourne Storm	Retirement
Justin O'Neill	Melbourne Storm	North Queensland Cowboys
Ben Roberts	Melbourne Storm	Super League: Castleford Tigers
Joel Romelo	Melbourne Storm	Eastern Suburbs Tigers (Intrust Super Cup)
George Rose	Melbourne Storm	St. George Illawarra Dragons
Sisa Waqa	Melbourne Storm	Canberra Raiders
Darius Boyd	Newcastle Knights	Brisbane Broncos
Adam Cuthbertson	Newcastle Knights	Super League: Leeds Rhinos
Michael Dobson	Newcastle Knights	Super League: Salford Red Devils
Willie Mason	Newcastle Knights	Manly Warringah Sea Eagles
Alex McKinnon	Newcastle Knights	Retirement
Timana Tahu	Newcastle Knights	Retirement
Zane Tetevano	Newcastle Knights	N/A
Travis Waddell	Newcastle Knights	Brisbane Broncos
Jayson Bukuya	New Zealand Warriors	Cronulla-Sutherland Sharks
Suaia Matagi	New Zealand Warriors	Sydney Roosters
Feleti Mateo	New Zealand Warriors	Manly Warringah Sea Eagles
Dane Nielsen	New Zealand Warriors	St. George Illawarra Dragons
Jerome Ropati	New Zealand Warriors	Retirement
Anthony Mitchell	North Queensland Cowboys	Townsville Blackhawks (Intrust Super Cup)
Ashton Sims	North Queensland Cowboys	Super League: Warrington Wolves
Tariq Sims	North Queensland Cowboys	Newcastle Knights
Brent Tate	North Queensland Cowboys	Retirement
Ricky Thorby	North Queensland Cowboys	Townsville Blackhawks (Intrust Super Cup)
Mitchell Allgood	Parramatta Eels	Super League: Hull Kingston Rovers
Jarryd Hayne	Parramatta Eels	San Francisco 49ers (NFL)
Fuifui Moimoi	Parramatta Eels	Leigh Centurions
Lee Mossop	Parramatta Eels	Super League: Wigan Warriors
Ken Sio	Parramatta Eels	Super League: Hull Kingston Rovers
Ben Smith	Parramatta Eels	Retirement
Willie Tonga	Parramatta Eels	Super League: Catalans Dragons
Tim Grant	Penrith Panthers	South Sydney Rabbitohs
Kevin Kingston	Penrith Panthers	Retirement
Kevin Naiqama	Penrith Panthers	Wests Tigers
Wes Naiqama	Penrith Panthers	London Broncos
Matt Robinson	Penrith Panthers	Gold Coast Titans
Ryan Simpkins	Penrith Panthers	Gold Coast Titans
Luke Burgess	South Sydney Rabbitohs	Manly Warringah Sea Eagles
Sam Burgess	South Sydney Rabbitohs	Bath (English rugby union)
Beau Champion	South Sydney Rabbitohs	Parramatta Eels
Nathan Merritt	South Sydney Rabbitohs	Retirement
Joe Picker	South Sydney Rabbitohs	Retirement
Ben Te'o	South Sydney Rabbitohs	Leinster (Irish rugby union)
Lote Tuqiri	South Sydney Rabbitohs	Retirement
Gerard Beale	St. George Illawarra Dragons	Cronulla-Sutherland Sharks
Bronson Harrison	St. George Illawarra Dragons	Retirement
Dan Hunt	St. George Illawarra Dragons	Retirement
Brett Morris	St. George Illawarra Dragons	Canterbury-Bankstown Bulldogs
Adam Quinlan	St. George Illawarra Dragons	Super League: St. Helens
Kyle Stanley	St. George Illawarra Dragons	Retirement
Jack Stockwell	St. George Illawarra Dragons	Newcastle Knights
Michael Witt	St. George Illawarra Dragons	Retirement
Rémi Casty	Sydney Roosters	Super League: Catalans Dragons
Heath L'Estrange	Sydney Roosters	St. George Illawarra Dragons
Anthony Minichiello	Sydney Roosters	Retirement
Daniel Mortimer	Sydney Roosters	Gold Coast Titans
Frank-Paul Nu'uausala	Sydney Roosters	Canberra Raiders
Sonny Bill Williams	Sydney Roosters	Counties Manukau (New Zealand rugby union)
Braith Anasta	Wests Tigers	Retirement
Blake Austin	Wests Tigers	Canberra Raiders
Adam Blair	Wests Tigers	Brisbane Broncos
Liam Fulton	Wests Tigers	Retirement
Cory Paterson	Wests Tigers	Super League: Salford Red Devils
Bodene Thompson	Wests Tigers	New Zealand Warriors
Daryl Millard	Super League: Catalans Dragons	South Sydney Rabbitohs
Sam Williams	Super League: Catalans Dragons	Canberra Raiders
Antonio Kaufusi	Super League: Huddersfield Giants	Canterbury-Bankstown Bulldogs
Greg Eden	Super League: Hull Kingston Rovers	Brisbane Broncos
Josh Hodgson	Super League: Hull Kingston Rovers	Canberra Raiders
Josh Drinkwater	Super League: London Broncos	Wests Tigers
Willie Manu	Super League: St. Helens	Sydney Roosters
Iosia Soliola	Super League: St. Helens	Canberra Raiders
Blake Green	Super League: Wigan Warriors	Melbourne Storm
Eddy Pettybourne	Super League: Wigan Warriors	Gold Coast Titans
Richie Faʻaoso	N/A	Parramatta Eels
Blake Ferguson	N/A	Sydney Roosters
Lagi Setu	N/A	Sydney Roosters
Danny Wicks	Suspension	Parramatta Eels

=== Coaches ===
Coach	2014 Club	2015 Club
Wayne Bennett	Newcastle Knights	Brisbane Broncos
