= 2015 Penrith Panthers season =

- NRL Rank: 11th
- 2015 record: Wins: 9; losses: 15
- Points scored: For: 399; against: 477

Team information
- Coach: Ivan Cleary
- Captain: Peter Wallace
- Stadium: Pepper Stadium - 22,500
- Avg. attendance: 11,544
- High attendance: 18,817 vs. Canterbury-Bankstown Bulldogs, 8 March

Top scorers
- Tries: David Simmons (9)
- Goals: Jamie Soward (22)
- Points: Matt Moylan (50)
Away colours
← 2014	List of seasons	2016 →

The 2015 Penrith Panthers season was the 49th in the club's history. Coached by Ivan Cleary and captained by Peter Wallace, the team competed in the National Rugby League's 2015 Telstra Premiership. They also competed in the 2015 NRL Auckland Nines pre-season tournament.

The Panthers were riddled by injury throughout 2015, and as a result, used a total of 32 players over the course of the season - the most of any club for that year. The club finished the season in 11th place, managing to avoid the wooden spoon by defeating the last-placed Newcastle Knights in their final game. Despite this, the Panthers under 20s team won the 2015 National Youth Competition premiership.

== Squad ==
Penrith Panthers
NRL Squad 2015			Coaching staff
Sam Anderson – PR, LK; Waqa Blake – CE, WG; Lewis Brown – SR, CE, LK; Reagan Campbell-Gillard – PR; Bryce Cartwright – SR, FE; Adam Docker – SR, LK; Jamal Idris – CE; George Jennings – WG; Robert Jennings – WG; Isaac John – FE, HB; Sione Katoa – HK; Brent Kite – PR	Apisai Koroisau – HK, FE; Jeremy Latimore – PR; Leilani Latu – PR; Josh Mansour – WG; Sika Manu – SR; Sam McKendry – PR; Matt Moylan – FB; Ben Murdoch-Masila – PR, SR; Tyrone Peachey – FE, SR; Nigel Plum – PR, SR; James Segeyaro – HK; David Simmons – WG	Chris Smith – WG; Will Smith – FB, FE; Tupou Sopoaga – SR, LK; Jamie Soward – FE, HB; Shaun Spence – SR, LK, PR; Elijah Taylor – LK; Peter Wallace (c) – HB; Dallin Watene-Zelezniak – WG, FB; Dean Whare – CE; Isaah Yeo – SR, CE	Head coach: Ivan Cleary; Assistant coaches: David Fairleigh; Trent Barrett; Garth Brennan (NSW Cup coach); Cameron Ciraldo (NYC Coach); Legend: (c) Captain(s); (vc) Vice-captain(s)

=== Player transfers ===
Gains
Player	Signed From	Until End of	Notes
Adrian Davis	Redcliffe Dolphins (QLD Cup)	2015	
Apisai Koroisau	South Sydney Rabbitohs	2016	
Tupou Sopoaga	Cronulla-Sutherland Sharks	2016	

Losses
Player	Signed From	Until End of	Notes
Luke Capewell	Redcliffe Dolphins (QLD Cup)		
Anthony Cherrington	Redcliffe Dolphins (QLD Cup)		
Tim Grant	South Sydney Rabbitohs	2018	
Tom Humble	Townsville Blackhawks (QLD Cup)		
Kevin Kingston	Retirement	-	
Kierran Moseley	Gold Coast Titans	2016	
Eto Nabuli	St. George Illawarra Dragons	2016	
Kevin Naiqama	Wests Tigers	2015	
Wes Naiqama	London Broncos (Super League)	2016	
Matt Robinson	Gold Coast Titans		
Ryan Simpkins	Gold Coast Titans	2016	

== Fixtures ==
=== NRL Auckland Nines ===
The NRL Auckland Nines is a pre-season rugby league nines competition featuring all 16 NRL clubs. The 2015 competition was played over two days on 31 January and 1 February at Eden Park. The Panthers featured in the Waiheke pool and played the Rabbitohs, Cowboys and Storm, losing all three of their games.

Penrith Panthers
Auckland Nines Squad 2015		Coaching staff
1 Will Smith; 2 Isaac John; 3 Adrian Davis; 4 Isaah Yeo; 5 Kieren Moss; 6 George Jennings; 7 Sika Manu; 8 Ben Murdoch-Masila; 9 Apisai Koroisau	10 Tupou Sopoaga; 11 Brendon Attwood; 12 Nathan Smith; 13 Reagan Campbell-Gillard; 14 Christian Crichton; 15 Joshua Jay; 16 Kevin Kingston (c); 17 Andy Saunders; 18 Chris Smith	Head coach: Ivan Cleary; Legend: (c) Captain(s); (vc) Vice-captain(s); Updated: Source(s): Team Announcement

Pos	Team	Pld	W	D	L	PF	PA	PD	Pts
1	South Sydney Rabbitohs	3	3	0	0	54	20	+34	6
2	North Queensland Cowboys	3	2	0	1	43	35	+8	4
3	Melbourne Storm	3	1	0	2	32	45	−13	2
4	Penrith Panthers	3	0	0	3	16	45	−29	0

Date	Round	Opponent	Venue	Score	Tries	Goals
Saturday, 31 January	Game 4	South Sydney Rabbitohs	Eden Park	4-11	Sopoaga	John (0/1)
Saturday, 31 January	Game 11	Melbourne Storm	Eden Park	20-4	Jay	Koroisau (0/1)
Sunday, 1 February	Game 20	North Queensland Cowboys	Eden Park	14-8	Jay, C Smith	Davis (0/2)
Legend: Win Loss Draw Bye

=== Regular season ===
Date	Round	Opponent	Venue	Score	Tries	Goals	Attendance
Sunday, 8 March	Round 1	Canterbury-Bankstown Bulldogs	Pepper Stadium	24-18	G Jennings, Segeyaro, Watene-Zelezniak	Soward (4/5)	18,814
Saturday, 14 March	Round 2	Gold Coast Titans	Carrington Park	40-0	Cartwright, Idris (3), G Jennings, Manu, Whare (2)	Moylan (4/6), Soward (0/2)	6,240
Monday, 23 March	Round 3	Sydney Roosters	Allianz Stadium	20-12	Idris, Segeyaro	Moylan (2/2)	10,735
Saturday, 28 March	Round 4	Newcastle Knights	Hunter Stadium	26-14	Mansour, Moylan, Whare	Moylan (1/3)	20,114
Monday, 6 April	Round 5	North Queensland Cowboys	Pepper Stadium	10-30	Segeyaro, Whare	Moylan (1/2)	8,409
Saturday, 11 April	Round 6	Manly Warringah Sea Eagles	Pepper Stadium	22-12	Blake, Koroisau, Mansour (2)	Moylan (3/4)	11,170
Saturday, 18 April	Round 7	Gold Coast Titans	Cbus Super Stadium	32-6	Blake	Moylan (1/1)	9,244
Sunday, 26 April	Round 8	Cronulla-Sutherland Sharks	Pepper Stadium	26-18	Moylan, Peachey, Simmons, Watene-Zelezniak	Moylan (5/5)	12,798
Friday, 8 May	Round 9	Brisbane Broncos	Suncorp Stadium	8-5		Moylan (2/2, 1 FG)	24,566
Monday, 18 May	Round 10	Manly Warringah Sea Eagles	Brookvale Oval	10-11	Simmons, Watene-Zelezniak	Moylan (1/3, 1 FG)	8,025
	Round 11	Bye					
Friday, 29 May	Round 12	Parramatta Eels	Pepper Stadium	20-26	Cartwright, Simmons, Watene-Zelezniak, Yeo	Cartwright (0/1), Wallace (2/3)	17,821
Saturday, 6 June	Round 13	Melbourne Storm	Pepper Stadium	0-20			11,849
	Round 14	Bye					
Saturday, 20 June	Round 15	Canterbury-Bankstown Bulldogs	ANZ Stadium	24-12	Cartwright (2)	Soward (2/2)	12,476
Sunday, 28 June	Round 16	Wests Tigers	Leichhardt Oval	12-35	Mansour, Simmons (4), Wallace, Watene-Zelezniak	Koroisau (0/1), Simmons (1/1), Soward (2/5), Wallace (1 FG)	14,234
Friday, 3 July	Round 17	South Sydney Rabbitohs	Pepper Stadium	20-6	Blake, Wallace, Watene-Zelezniak, Whare	Koroisau (2/3), Soward (0/1), Wallace (0/1)	14,068
Saturday, 11 July	Round 18	Sydney Roosters	Pepper Stadium	4-24	Brown	Koroisau (0/1)	13,654
Friday, 17 July	Round 19	Melbourne Storm	AAMI Park	52-10	Blake, Peachey	Soward (1/2)	11,956
Sunday, 26 July	Round 20	Canberra Raiders	Pepper Stadium	24-34	R Jennings, Segeyaro, Taylor, Yeo	Soward (4/4)	8,048
Sunday, 2 August	Round 21	South Sydney Rabbitohs	ANZ Stadium	20-16	Brown, Cartwright, Segeyaro	Soward (2/3)	13,391
Saturday, 8 August	Round 22	Parramatta Eels	TIO Stadium	10-4	Blake	Soward (0/1)	8,340
Saturday, 15 August	Round 23	New Zealand Warriors	Pepper Stadium	24-10	Brown, Campbell-Gillard, Peachey, Simmons	Soward (4/5)	6,774
Thursday, 20 August	Round 24	St. George Illawarra Dragons	WIN Stadium	19-12	Mansour, Simmons	Soward (2/3)	9,145
Monday, 31 August	Round 25	Canberra Raiders	GIO Stadium	34-18	Brown, Segeyaro, W Smith	Koroisau (2/2), Soward (1/1)	6,717
Saturday, 5 September	Round 26	Newcastle Knights	Pepper Stadium	30-12	Mansour, Peachey (2), W Smith, Whare	Simmons (1/1), W Smith (4/5)	8,936
Legend: Win Loss Draw Bye

== Ladder ==
2015 NRL season
Pos	Team	Pld	W	D	L	B	PF	PA	PD	Pts
1	Sydney Roosters	24	18	0	6	2	591	300	+291	40
2	Brisbane Broncos	24	17	0	7	2	574	379	+195	38
3	North Queensland Cowboys (P)	24	17	0	7	2	587	454	+133	38
4	Melbourne Storm	24	14	0	10	2	467	348	+119	32
5	Canterbury-Bankstown Bulldogs	24	14	0	10	2	522	480	+42	32
6	Cronulla-Sutherland Sharks	24	14	0	10	2	469	476	−7	32
7	South Sydney Rabbitohs	24	13	0	11	2	465	467	−2	30
8	St. George Illawarra Dragons	24	12	0	12	2	435	408	+27	28
9	Manly-Warringah Sea Eagles	24	11	0	13	2	458	492	−34	26
10	Canberra Raiders	24	10	0	14	2	577	569	+8	24
11	Penrith Panthers	24	9	0	15	2	399	477	−78	22
12	Parramatta Eels	24	9	0	15	2	448	573	−125	22
13	New Zealand Warriors	24	9	0	15	2	445	588	−143	22
14	Gold Coast Titans	24	9	0	15	2	439	636	−197	22
15	Wests Tigers	24	8	0	16	2	487	562	−75	20
16	Newcastle Knights	24	8	0	16	2	458	612	−154	20

== Statistics ==
Name	App	T	G	FG	Pts
Sam Anderson	1	0	0	0	0
Waqa Blake	18	5	0	0	20
Lewis Brown	21	4	0	0	16
Reagan Campbell-Gillard	24	1	0	0	4
Bryce Cartwright	21	5	0	0	20
Adam Docker	1	0	0	0	0
Jamal Idris	6	4	0	0	16
George Jennings	5	2	0	0	8
Robert Jennings	5	1	0	0	4
Isaac John	7	0	0	0	0
Sione Katoa	1	0	0	0	0
Brent Kite	6	0	0	0	0
Apisai Koroisau	16	1	4	0	12
Jeremy Latimore	24	0	0	0	0
Leilani Latu	6	0	0	0	0
Sam McKendry	24	0	0	0	0
Josh Mansour	12	6	0	0	24
Sika Manu	18	1	0	0	4
Matt Moylan	11	2	20	2	50
Tyrone Peachey	22	5	0	0	20
Nigel Plum	14	0	0	0	0
James Segeyaro	18	6	0	0	24
David Simmons	13	9	2	0	40
Chris Smith	1	0	0	0	0
Will Smith	9	2	4	0	16
Tupou Sopoaga	5	0	0	0	0
Jamie Soward	16	0	22	0	44
Elijah Taylor	20	1	0	0	4
Peter Wallace	13	2	2	1	13
Dallin Watene-Zelezniak	16	7	0	0	28
Dean Whare	13	6	0	0	24
Isaah Yeo	21	2	0	0	8
Totals	24	72	54	3	399

== Representative ==
=== Domestic ===
Pos.	Player	Team	Call-up
FB	Matt Moylan	NRL All Stars	2015 All Stars Match
SR	Tyrone Peachey	Indigenous All Stars	2015 All Stars Match
CE	Waqa Blake	NSW City	2015 City vs Country Origin
BE	Reagan Campbell-Gillard	NSW City	2015 City vs Country Origin
FB	Matt Moylan	NSW City	2015 City vs Country Origin
LK	Tyrone Peachey	NSW City	2015 City vs Country Origin
20^{1}	Matt Moylan	New South Wales	2015 State of Origin

=== International ===
Pos.	Player	Team	Call-up
HK	Apisai Koroisau	Fiji	2015 Melanesian Cup
SR	Sika Manu^{2}	Tonga	2015 Polynesian Cup
BE	Ben Murdoch-Masila	Tonga	2015 Polynesian Cup
BE	Lewis Brown	New Zealand	2015 New Zealand tour of England
CE	Dean Whare	New Zealand	2015 New Zealand tour of England

1 - Selected as 20th Man, Moylan did not play during the series.
2 - Manu captained the Tongan side during their match against Samoa.
