= 2015 St. George Illawarra Dragons season =

- NRL rank: 8th
- Play-off result: Lost Elimination Final (Canterbury-Bankstown Bulldogs, 10-11)
- 2015 record: Wins: 12; draws: 0; losses: 12
- Points scored: For: 377; against: 350

Team information
- CEO: Peter Doust
- Coach: (Australia) Paul McGregor
- Assistant coach: (Australia) Ian Millward, (Australia) Dean Young, (Australia) Ben Hornby
- Captain: (Australia) Ben Creagh,
- Stadium: WIN Jubilee Oval WIN Stadium
- Avg. attendance: 13,698

Top scorers
- Tries: Peter Mata'utia and Gareth Widdop (7)
- Points: Gareth Widdop (148)
← 2014	2016 →

The 2015 St. George Illawarra Dragons season is the 17th in the joint venture club's history. Coached by Paul McGregor, and captained by Ben Creagh, they compete in the NRL's 2015 Telstra Premiership season.

== Squad movement ==
=== Gains ===
Player	Signed from	Until end of	Notes
Dane Nielsen	New Zealand Warriors	2016	
Eto Nabuli	Penrith Panthers	2016	
Kris Keating	Hull KR	2015	
George Rose	Melbourne Storm	2015	
Rulon Nutira	Gundagai Tigers	2015	
Beau Henry	Gold Coast Titans	2015	
Heath L'Estrange	Sydney Roosters	2015	
Adam Tuimavave-Gerrard	New Zealand Warriors	2016	

=== Losses ===
Player	Signed to	Until end of	Notes
Dane Nielsen	Sacked mid-season	-	
Brett Morris	Canterbury-Bankstown Bulldogs	2018	
Kyle Stanley	Cronulla-Sutherland Sharks	2015	
Gerard Beale	Cronulla-Sutherland Sharks	2017	
Jack Bird	Cronulla-Sutherland Sharks	2016	
Jack Stockwell	Newcastle Knights	2017	
Sam Williams	Canberra Raiders	2016	
Matt Groat	Salford Red Devils	N/A	
Josh Ailaoma	Released	-	-
Bronson Harrison	Released	-	-
Willie Mataka	Released	-	-
Shane Pumipi	Released	-	-

== Ladder ==
2015 NRL season
Pos	Team	Pld	W	D	L	B	PF	PA	PD	Pts
1	Sydney Roosters	24	18	0	6	2	591	300	+291	40
2	Brisbane Broncos	24	17	0	7	2	574	379	+195	38
3	North Queensland Cowboys (P)	24	17	0	7	2	587	454	+133	38
4	Melbourne Storm	24	14	0	10	2	467	348	+119	32
5	Canterbury-Bankstown Bulldogs	24	14	0	10	2	522	480	+42	32
6	Cronulla-Sutherland Sharks	24	14	0	10	2	469	476	−7	32
7	South Sydney Rabbitohs	24	13	0	11	2	465	467	−2	30
8	St. George Illawarra Dragons	24	12	0	12	2	435	408	+27	28
9	Manly-Warringah Sea Eagles	24	11	0	13	2	458	492	−34	26
10	Canberra Raiders	24	10	0	14	2	577	569	+8	24
11	Penrith Panthers	24	9	0	15	2	399	477	−78	22
12	Parramatta Eels	24	9	0	15	2	448	573	−125	22
13	New Zealand Warriors	24	9	0	15	2	445	588	−143	22
14	Gold Coast Titans	24	9	0	15	2	439	636	−197	22
15	Wests Tigers	24	8	0	16	2	487	562	−75	20
16	Newcastle Knights	24	8	0	16	2	458	612	−154	20

== Fixtures ==
=== NRL Auckland Nines ===
The NRL Auckland Nines is a pre-season rugby league nines competition featuring all 16 NRL clubs. The 2015 competition was played over two days on 31 January and 1 February at Eden Park. The Dragons feature in the Rangitoto pool and played the Parramatta Eels, Newcastle Knights and Manly Warringah Sea Eagles.

Pos	Team	Pld	W	D	L	PF	PA	PD	Pts
1	Parramatta Eels	3	2	0	1	53	44	+9	4
2	Newcastle Knights	3	2	0	1	53	45	+8	4
3	St George Illawarra Dragons	3	2	0	1	44	49	−5	4
4	Manly-Warringah Sea Eagles	3	0	0	3	55	67	−12	0

Date	Time (Local)	Round	Opponent	Score	Tries	Goals
Saturday 31 January	9:55 am	1	Newcastle Knights	7-18	Etonia Nabuli	Josh Dugan (1)
Saturday 31 January	1:50 pm	2	Manly-Warringah Sea Eagles	25-22	Etonia Nabuli (2), Joel Thompson, Kiti Glymin	Josh Dugan (1), Benji Marshall (1)
Sunday 1 February	8:10 am	3	Parramatta Eels	12-10	Kiti Glymin, Benji Marshall, Shannon Crook	

=== Regular season ===
Date	Round	Opponent	Venue	Score	Tries	Goals	Attendance
Monday 9 March	1	Melbourne Storm	Jubilee Oval	4-12	Eto Nabuli		10,028
Monday 16 March	2	West Tigers	Campbelltown Stadium	4-22	Dane Nielsen		11,837
Saturday 21 March	3	Canberra Raiders	GIO Stadium	22-20	Trent Merrin, Jason Nightingale, Mitch Rein, Joel Thompson	Gareth Widdop (3/5)	11,774
Saturday 28 March	4	Manly Warringah Sea Eagles	Jubilee Oval	12-4	Jason Nightingale	Gareth Widdop (4)	12,087
Saturday 4 April	5	Newcastle Knights	Hunter Stadium	13-0	Eto Nabuli, Josh Dugan	Gareth Widdop (2/3) Benji Marshall (FG)	14,261
Sunday 12 April	6	Canterbury-Bankstown Bulldogs	ANZ Stadium	31-6	Josh Dugan, Peter Mata'utia, Tyson Frizell, Joel Thompson Euan Aitken	Gareth Widdop (5), Benji Marshall (FG)	20,273
Friday 17 April	7	Brisbane Broncos	Jubilee Oval	12-10	Eto Nabuli, Matt Cooper	Gareth Widdop (2/3)	13,029
Saturday 25 April	8	Sydney Roosters	Allianz Stadium	14-12	Peter Mata'utia, Mitch Rein	Gareth Widdop (3/4)	35,110
Monday 11 May	9	South Sydney Rabbitohs	ANZ Stadium	10-16	Gareth Widdop, Jason Nightingale	Gareth Widdop (1/3)	14,126
Sunday 17 May	10	Canberra Raiders	WIN Stadium	32-18	Gareth Widdop, Jason Nightingale, Euan Aitken, Joel Thompson, Benji Marshall	Gareth Widdop (6/7)	13,102
	11	BYE					
Sunday 31 May	12	Cronulla-Sutherland Sharks	Jubilee Oval	42-6	Josh Dugan, Mitch Rein, Will Matthews, Jack de Belin, Peter Mata'utia, Eto Nabuli	Gareth Widdop (9)	18,011
Monday 8 June	13	Canterbury-Bankstown Bulldogs	ANZ Stadium	16-29	Gareth Widdop (2), Peter Mata'utia	Gareth Widdop (2/3)	27,291
	14	BYE					
Monday 22 June	15	Sydney Roosters	Allianz Stadium	14-19	Peter Mata'utia, Gareth Widdop	Gareth Widdop (3)	10,185
Saturday 27 June	16	Parramatta Eels	Pirtek Stadium	12-16	Euan Aitken (2)	Gareth Widdop (2/3)	15,046
Saturday 4 July	17	North Queensland Cowboys	WIN Stadium	12-18	Euan Aitken, Mark Ioane	Gareth Widdop (2)	11,813
Sunday 12 July	18	Cronulla-Sutherland Sharks	Remondis Stadium	8-28	Charly Runciman (2)		12,792
Saturday 18 July	19	South Sydney Rabbitohs	Sydney Cricket Ground	8-24	Justin Hunt, Josh Dugan		18,217
Saturday 25 July	20	Melbourne Storm	McLean Park	4-24	Peter Mata'utia		14,532
Sunday 2 August	21	Newcastle Knights	Jubilee Oval	46-24	Josh Dugan, Mitch Rein, Gareth Widdop, Tyson Frizell, Benji Marshall, Will Matthews	Gareth Widdop (9)	10,236
Saturday 8 August	22	New Zealand Warriors	Westpac Stadium	36-0	Justin Hunt, Mitch Rein, Jake Marketo, Peter Mata'utia, Gareth Widdop, Tyson Frizell	Gareth Widdop (6/8)	18,317
Friday 14 August	23	Brisbane Broncos	Suncorp Stadium	6-32	Justin Hunt	Gareth Widdop (1)	33,480
Thursday 20 August	24	Penrith Panthers	WIN Stadium	19 – 12	Peter Mata'utia, Gareth Widdop	Gareth Widdop (5/5 (3 Penalty Goals)), Benji Marshall (FG)	9,145
Sunday 30 August	25	Gold Coast Titans	Cbus Super Stadium	26 – 28	Mitch Rein, Michael Cooper, Benji Marshall, Gareth Widdop	Gareth Widdop (5/5 (1 Penalty Goal))	12,335
Saturday 5 September	26	Wests Tigers	ANZ Stadium	32 – 30 (After Extra Time)	Euan Aitken (2), Josh Dugan, Eto Nabuli, Tyson Fritzell, Jason Nightingale	Josh Dugan (4/7 (1 Penalty Goal))	

== Finals ==
Qualifying and elimination finals
11 Sept, Sydney Football Stadium
1	Sydney Roosters	18
4	Melbourne	20
12 Sept, Stadium Australia
5	Canterbury	11
8	St. George Illawarra	10
13 Sept, Sydney Football Stadium
6	Cronulla	28
7	Souths	12
12 Sept, Lang Park
2	Brisbane	16
3	North Queensland	12

Semi-finals
18 Sept, Sydney Football Stadium
Sydney Roosters	38
Canterbury	12
19 Sept, Willows Sports Complex
North Queensland	39
Cronulla	0

Preliminary finals
26 Sept, Melbourne Rectangular Stadium
Melbourne	12
North Queensland	32
25 Sept, Lang Park
Brisbane	31
Sydney Roosters	12

Grand final
4 Oct, Stadium Australia
Brisbane	16
North Queensland	17

Date	Round	Opponent	Venue	Score	Tries	Goals	Attendance
Saturday, 12 September	Elimination Final	Canterbury-Bankstown Bulldogs	ANZ Stadium	11 – 10	Nabuli	Widdop (3/3 (2 Penalty Goals))	33,854
Legend: Win Loss Draw

== Players ==
Player	App	T	G	FG	Pts
Leeson Ah Mau	21	0	0	0	0
Euan Aitken	19	4	0	0	16
Mike Cooper	20	1	0	0	4
Ben Creagh	17	0	0	0	0
Jack De Belin	18	1	0	0	4
Josh Dugan	18	6	0	0	24
Dylan Farrell	12	0	0	0	0
Tyson Frizell	17	3	0	0	12
Craig Garvey	5	0	0	0	0
Yaw Kiti Glymin	1	0	0	0	0
Nathan Green	3	0	0	0	0
Justin Hunt	6	3	0	0	12
Drew Hutchison	2	0	0	0	0
Mark Ioane	3	1	0	0	4
Heath L'Estrange	16	0	0	0	0
Jake Marketo	15	1	0	0	4
Benji Marshall	19	2	0	2	10
Peter Mata'utia	17	7	0	0	28
Will Matthews	13	2	0	0	8
Trent Merrin	16	1	0	0	4
Etonia Nabuli	11	5	0	0	20
Dane Nielsen	2	1	0	0	4
Jason Nightingale	15	4	0	0	16
Rory O'Brien	3	0	0	0	0
Luke Page	1	0	0	0	0
Mitch Rein	20	5	0	0	20
George Rose	7	0	0	0	0
Charly Runciman	2	2	0	0	8
Joel Thompson	17	3	0	0	12
Gareth Widdop	21	7	60	0	148

Source=
