= 2015 Wests Tigers season =

- NRL Rank: 15th
- 2015 record: Wins: 8; draws: 0; losses: 16
- Points scored: For: 487; against: 562

Team information
- CEO: Grant Meyer (until June); Phil Moss (June - September); Justin Pascoe (current)
- Coach: Jason Taylor
- Captain: Robbie Farah
- Avg. attendance: 11,709
- High attendance: 20,121 (vs. Canterbury in round 4)

Top scorers
- Tries: Pat Richards and James Tedesco (17)
- Goals: Pat Richards (64) and 1 FG
- Points: Pat Richards (197)
← 2014	2016 →

The 2015 West Tigers season was the sixteenth season in the club's history. Coached by Jason Taylor and captained by Robbie Farah, they completed the NRL's 2015 Telstra Premiership in second last position.

== Squad movement ==
=== Gains ===
Player	Signed from	Until end of	Notes
Kevin Naiqama	Penrith Panthers	2016	
Matthew Lodge	Melbourne Storm	2017	
John Sila	Canterbury-Bankstown Bulldogs	?	
Brenden Santi	Parramatta Eels	2015	
Josh Drinkwater	London Broncos	2016	

=== Losses ===
Player	Signed to	Until end of	Notes
Adam Blair	Brisbane Broncos	2017	
Blake Austin	Canberra Raiders	2017	
Braith Anasta	Retired	-	
Liam Fulton	Retired	-	
Marika Koroibete	Melbourne Storm	2018	
Ben Murdoch-Masila	Penrith Panthers	2015	
Cory Paterson	Retired	-	
Jarred Farlow	Lézignan Sangliers	?	
James Gavet	Brisbane Broncos	2016	
Bodene Thompson	New Zealand Warriors	2017	
Jy Hitchcox	Featherstone Rovers	2016	

=== Re-signings ===
Player	Until end of	Notes
James Tedesco	2017	
Aaron Woods	2017	
Curtis Sironen	2017	
David Nofoaluma	2017	
Ava Seumanufagai	2015	
Sitaleki Akauola	2016	
Manaia Cherrington	2016	
Asipeli Fine	2017	
Dallas Graham	2017	
Delouise Hoeter	2016	

== Ladder ==
2015 NRL season
Pos	Team	Pld	W	D	L	B	PF	PA	PD	Pts
1	Sydney Roosters	24	18	0	6	2	591	300	+291	40
2	Brisbane Broncos	24	17	0	7	2	574	379	+195	38
3	North Queensland Cowboys (P)	24	17	0	7	2	587	454	+133	38
4	Melbourne Storm	24	14	0	10	2	467	348	+119	32
5	Canterbury-Bankstown Bulldogs	24	14	0	10	2	522	480	+42	32
6	Cronulla-Sutherland Sharks	24	14	0	10	2	469	476	−7	32
7	South Sydney Rabbitohs	24	13	0	11	2	465	467	−2	30
8	St. George Illawarra Dragons	24	12	0	12	2	435	408	+27	28
9	Manly-Warringah Sea Eagles	24	11	0	13	2	458	492	−34	26
10	Canberra Raiders	24	10	0	14	2	577	569	+8	24
11	Penrith Panthers	24	9	0	15	2	399	477	−78	22
12	Parramatta Eels	24	9	0	15	2	448	573	−125	22
13	New Zealand Warriors	24	9	0	15	2	445	588	−143	22
14	Gold Coast Titans	24	9	0	15	2	439	636	−197	22
15	Wests Tigers	24	8	0	16	2	487	562	−75	20
16	Newcastle Knights	24	8	0	16	2	458	612	−154	20

== Fixtures ==
=== NRL Auckland Nines ===
The NRL Auckland Nines was a pre-season rugby league nines competition featuring all 16 NRL clubs. The 2015 competition was played over two days on 31 January and 1 February at Eden Park. The Tigers feature in the Hunua Ranges pool and played the New Zealand Warriors, Gold Coast Titans, Canberra Raiders and Sydney Roosters

Pos	Team	Pld	W	D	L	PF	PA	PD	Pts
1	Wests Tigers	3	2	0	1	50	32	+18	4
2	New Zealand Warriors	3	2	0	1	58	41	+17	4
3	Gold Coast Titans	3	1	0	2	48	56	−8	2
4	Canberra Raiders	3	1	0	2	46	73	−27	2

Date	Time (Local)	Round	Opponent	Score	Tries	Goals
Saturday 31 January	11:20am	1	Canberra Raiders	16-10	Kyle Lovett (2), Jack Buchanan	Pat Richards (2/3)
Saturday 31 January	3:15pm	2	Gold Coast Titans	26-0	Asipeli Fine, Manaia Cherrington, Josh Drinkwater, Tim Simona	Pat Richards (2/4)
Sunday 1 February	9:50am	3	New Zealand Warriors	8-22	Chris Lawrence, Manaia Cherrington	
Sunday 1 February	12:45pm	4	Sydney Roosters	4-22	Kevin Naiqama	

=== Regular season ===
Date	Round	Opponent	Stadium	Score	Tries	Goals	Attendance
Saturday 7 March	1	Titans	Robina	19-18	P. Richards (2), James Tedesco	P. Richards (3/4) (1 FG)	14,319
Monday 16 March	2	Dragons	Campbelltown	22-4	P. Richards (2), Kevin Naiqama, James Tedesco	P. Richards (3/4)	11,834
Sunday 22 March	3	Rabbitohs	Stadium Australia	6-20	Robbie Farah	Pat Richards (1)	23,211
Friday 27 March	4	Bulldogs	Stadium Australia	24-25	J. Tedesco (2), Kyle Lovett, Luke Brooks	M. Moses (4)	20,121
Monday 6 April	5	Eels	Stadium Australia	22-6	Kevin Naiqama, James Tedesco, Pat Richards, Luke Brooks	P. Richards (3/5)	35,510
Saturday 11 April	6	Warriors	Mount Smart	22-32	T. Simona (2), James Tedesco, Pat Richards	P. Richards (3/4)	13,781
Sunday 19 April	7	Raiders	Leichhardt Oval	22-30	Tim Simona, Keith Galloway, Luke Brooks, Pat Richards	P Richards (3/4)	13,198
Friday 24 April	8	Bulldogs	Stadium Australia	38-14	J. Tedesco (2), L. Brooks (2), Kevin Naiqama, Pat Richards	P. Richards (7/9)	18,521
Friday 8 May	9	Roosters	Allianz Stadium	4-36	Dene Halatau		14,366
Sunday 17 May	10	Knights	Hunter	12-22	Dene Halatau, Luke Brooks	P. Richards (2)	15,573
Saturday 23 May	11	Cowboys	Campbelltown	0-8			8,267
	12	BYE					
Friday 5 June	13	Titans	Leichhardt Oval	20-27	C. Lawrence (2), James Tedesco	Pat Richards (4)	7,103
Friday 12 June	14	Rabbitohs	Stadium Australia	34-6	J. Tedesco (2), M. Taupau (2), Luke Brooks, David Nofoaluma	P. Richards (5/6)	15,118
Friday 19 June	15	Sea Eagles	Brookvale Oval	20-30	M. Moses (2), Pat Richards, Kevin Naiqama	P. Richards (2/4)	8,093
Sunday 28 June	16	Panthers	Leichhardt Oval	12-35	Chris Lawrence, Kevin Naiqama	P. Richards (2)	14,234
Monday 6 July	17	Eels	Stadium Australia	16-28	K. Naiqama (2), Pat Richards	P. Richards (2/4)	15,347
	18	BYE					
Sunday 19 July	19	Broncos	Lang Park	16-42	Ava Seumanufagai, Manaia Cherrington, Mitchell Moses	Pat Richards (2/3)	37,260
Friday 24 July	20	Roosters	Stadium Australia	8-33	James Tedesco, Pat Richards		10,186
Friday 31 July	21	Storm	Leichhardt Oval	34-16	J. Tedesco (2), Dene Halatau, Kevin Naiqama, Pat Richards, David Nofoaluma	P. Richards (5/6)	7,419
Monday 10 August	22	Raiders	Canberra Stadium	20-18	Sauaso Sue, James Tedesco, Pat Richards, Luke Brooks	Pat Richards (2/4)	8,704
Saturday 15 August	23	Knights	Campbelltown	18-24	David Nofoaluma, Pat Richards, James Tedesco	P. Richards (3/4)	10,963
Saturday 22 August	24	Sharks	Shark Park	18-40	Tim Simona, Martin Taupau, Curtis Sironen	P. Richards (3)	15,738
Sunday 30 August	25	Warriors	Campbelltown	50-16	D. Nofoaluma (2), K. Naiqama (2), Robbie Farah, Luke Brooks, Dene Halatau, Tim Simona, Martin Taupau, Pat Richards	P. Richards (7/9)	6,711
Saturday 5 September	26	Dragons	Stadium Australia	30-32	Pat Richards (2), Luke Brooks, Aaron Woods, James Tedesco, David Nofoaluma	Pat Richards (3/6)	17,685

== Player statistics ==
Name	App	T	G	FG	Pts
Luke Brooks	23	10	0	0	40
Jack Buchanan	12	0	0	0	0
Manaia Cherrington	11	1	0	0	4
Josh Drinkwater	1	0	0	0	0
Robbie Farah	17	2	0	0	8
Keith Galloway	22	1	0	0	4
Dene Halatau	22	4	0	0	16
Delouise Hoeter	7	0	0	0	0
Chris Lawrence	19	3	0	0	12
Lamar Liolevave	1	0	0	0	0
Matthew Lodge	8	0	0	0	0
Kyle Lovett	21	1	0	0	4
Nathan Milone	3	0	0	0	0
Mitchell Moses	24	3	5	0	22
Kevin Naiqama	24	9	0	0	36
David Nofoaluma	10	6	0	0	24
Pat Richards	23	17	64	1	197
Brenden Santi	10	0	0	0	0
Ava Seumanufagi	23	1	0	0	4
Tim Simona	20	5	0	0	20
Curtis Sironen	19	1	0	0	4
Sauaso Sue	23	1	0	0	4
Martin Taupau	21	4	0	0	16
James Tedesco	24	17	0	0	68
Aaron Woods	20	1	0	0	4

Source =
