= Feleti Mateo =

Former Tonga international rugby league footballer

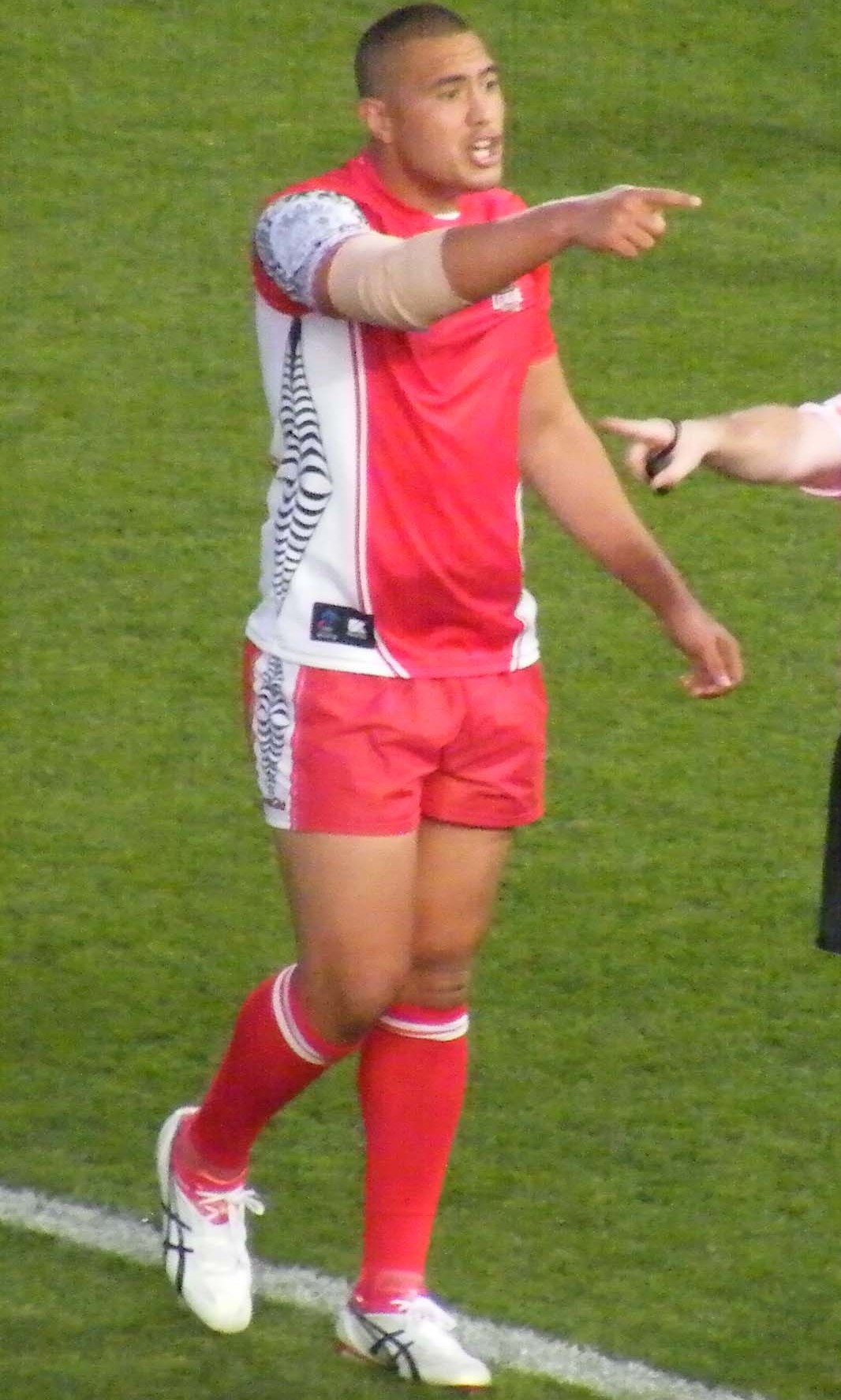

Personal information
- Full name: Feleti Sosefo Mateo
- Born: 2 June 1984 (age 42) Sydney, New South Wales, Australia

Playing information
- Height: 194 cm (6 ft 4 in)
- Weight: 110 kg (17 st 5 lb)
- Position: Second-row, Lock, Five-eighth
Club
| Years | Team | Pld | T | G | FG | P |
|---|---|---|---|---|---|---|
| 2004 | Parramatta Eels | 1 | 0 | 0 | 0 | 0 |
| 2005 | London Broncos | 14 | 1 | 0 | 0 | 4 |
| 2006–10 | Parramatta Eels | 88 | 20 | 0 | 0 | 80 |
| 2011–14 | New Zealand Warriors | 95 | 10 | 2 | 0 | 44 |
| 2015–16 | Manly Sea Eagles | 22 | 2 | 5 | 0 | 18 |
| 2016 | Salford Red Devils | 3 | 0 | 0 | 0 | 0 |
| | Total | 223 | 33 | 7 | 0 | 146 |
Representative
| Years | Team | Pld | T | G | FG | P |
| 2006–16 | Tonga | 13 | 3 | 10 | 0 | 32 |
| 2008–13 | NSW City | 3 | 0 | 0 | 0 | 0 |
| 2010 | NRL All Stars | 1 | 0 | 0 | 0 | 0 |
| 2012 | Prime Minister's XIII | 1 | 0 | 0 | 0 | 0 |

Feleti Sosefo Mateo (born 2 June 1984) is a former Tonga international rugby league footballer. He played a variety of positions from lock, second-row and five-eighth. Mateo was also selected to represent NSW City Origin and the NRL All Stars. He last played for English club Salford Red Devils of Super League in 2016. Before that, he played for Sydney club the Parramatta Eels between 2004 and 2010 (interrupted by a one-season stint with the London Broncos in 2005). He also played for the New Zealand Warriors between 2011 and 2014, and the Manly-Warringah Sea Eagles in 2015 and 2016 before moving back to England and finishing his top-level career with Salford. Mateo was renowned for his versatility and extravagant style of play.

== Background ==
Mateo was born in Sydney, Australia on 2 June 1984. He is of English and Tongan descent.

He attended Westfields Sports High School until year 10 and then moved to Terra Sancta College. While at college, Mateo played for the Dundas Shamrocks and Lalor Park Kookaburras before being signed by the Parramatta Eels. Mateo played for the Australian Schoolboys team in 2003 on a tour of New Zealand. In 2004, Mateo was selected for the New South Wales under 19's and also made the Junior Kanagaroo's tour of Papua New Guinea.

== Playing career ==
=== 2004 ===
In Round 20 of the 2004 NRL season, Mateo made his NRL début for the Parramatta Eels, playing against the Melbourne Storm from the interchange bench in the Eels 22–16 loss at Olympic Park. This was Mateo's only match in the 2004 NRL season for the Parramatta Eels.

=== 2005 ===
Mateo played a season with the London Broncos in 2005, appearing in 14 games and scoring a try after joining the club mid-season.

=== 2006 ===
Mateo returned to the Parramatta Eels in the 2006 NRL season and played in the NSWRL Premier League. Mateo was named the Parramatta Premier League Player of the Year and was named the grand final Man of the Match when the Eels defeated Newtown Jets 20–19 in extra time. On 22 October 2006, Mateo made his début for Tonga in the 2006 World Cup Qualifiers against Samoa, playing at five-eighth in the 18–10 win at Headingley Stadium.

=== 2007 ===
At the start of the 2007 NRL season, Mateo was selected in the Eels the NRL team. In Round 2, against the South Sydney Rabbitohs, Mateo made his return for the Parramatta Eels from the interchange bench in the 31–6 loss at ANZ Stadium. In Mateo's next match, in Round 3 against the Wests Tigers, Mateo scored his first NRL career try in the Eels 22–20 golden point extra time win at Parramatta Stadium. Mateo played in 25 matches and scored 9 tries in his return season for the Parramatta Eels in the 2007 NRL season. On 10 October 2007, Mateo played for Tonga against the Junior Kangaroos at five-eighth in the 44–6 win in Nuku'alofa.

=== 2008 ===
Mateo started 2008 in the five-eighth role, a position he played in his time at the London Broncos. Mateo played in the Eels Round 1 match, which was a 28–20 comeback victory over the Canterbury-Bankstown Bulldogs at ANZ Stadium. He scored two tries after the Eels trailed 20–0 at halftime. On 2 May 2008, Mateo played for NSW City Origin against NSW Country Origin off the interchange bench in the 22-all draw at WIN Stadium. Mateo played in 22 matches and scored 7 tries for the Eels in the 2008 NRL season. Mateo was named in the Tongan squad for the 2008 Rugby League World Cup. Mateo played at five-eighth and acted as the main play-maker for Tonga. Mateo scored one try and a number of assists for the Tongan team and also a vital 40/20 kick in the dying stages of their round one clash against Ireland that lead to the match winning try by Etu Uaisele in the 22–20 victory at Parramatta Stadium. Mateo played in 3 matches and scored a try in the tournament.

=== 2009 ===
In Round 10, against the Manly-Warringah Sea Eagles, Mateo suffered a shoulder injury in the 34–10 loss at Brookvale Oval which sidelined him for most of the year. However Mateo did make a return in Round 24 against the Wests Tigers in the Eels 26–18 win at the Sydney Football Stadium. Mateo played off the bench in matches leading up to the Eels 2009 NRL Grand Final against the Melbourne Storm. Mateo played off the interchange bench in the Eels 23–16 loss. Mateo played in 16 matches and scored 2 tries for the Eels in the 2009 NRL season. Mateo played for Tonga in the 2009 Pacific Cup tournament.

=== 2010 ===
On 10 May 2010, Mateo signed with the New Zealand Warriors for the 2011 NRL season and the following two seasons. Mateo played in 24 matches and scored 2 tries his final year with the Parramatta Eels in the 2010 NRL season. Mateo again played for Tonga in the post season.

=== 2011 ===
On 13 February 2011, Mateo was chosen to play for the NRL All Stars off the interchange bench in the 28–12 win over the Indigenous All Stars at Cbus Super Stadium. In Round 1 of the 2014 NRL season, Mateo made his club début for the New Zealand Warriors, playing against his former club the Parramatta Eels. In Round 11, against the South Sydney Rabbitohs, Mateo played his 100th NRL match in the Warriors 12–6 win at Mt Smart Stadium. In Round 19, against the Canterbury-Bankstown Bulldogs, Mateo scored his first club try for the Warriors in the 36–12 win at Mt Smart Stadium. On 2 October 2011, in the Warriors 2011 NRL Grand Final against the Manly-Warringah Sea Eagles, Mateo played off the interchange bench in the Warriors 24–10 loss. Mateo had a stellar début year with the New Zealand Warriors playing in all their 28 matches and scoring 5 tries. Mateo led to offload count in 2011 with 85 offloads. On 3 November 2011, at the annual RLIF Awards dinner, Mateo was named the Tonga player of the year.

=== 2012 ===
On 22 April 2012, Mateo played for NSW City Origin against NSW Country Origin at lock in the 24–22 win at Mudgee. Mateo finished the 2012 NRL season with him playing in all of the Warriors 24 matches and scoring 3 tries.

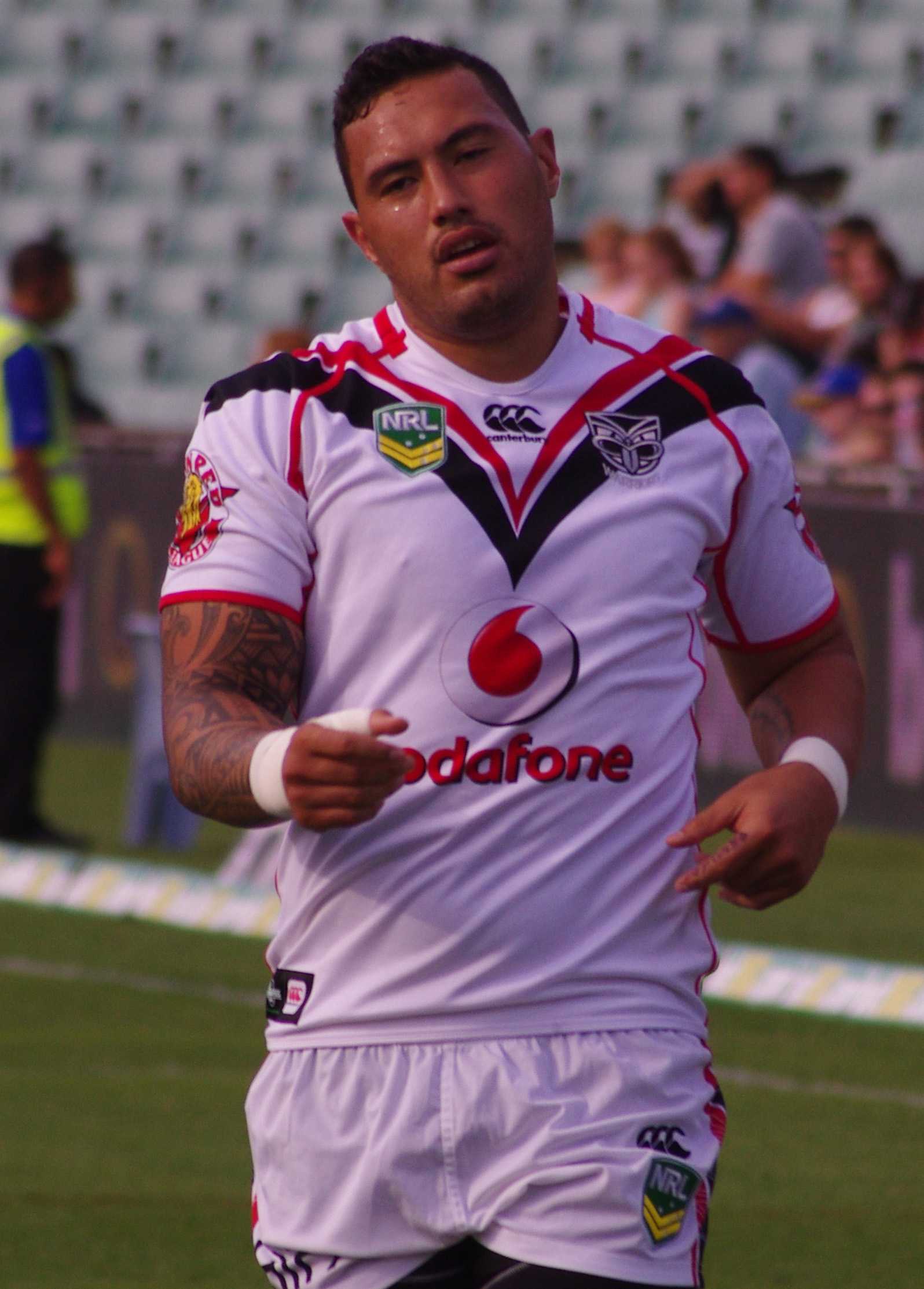
Mateo playing for the Warriors in 2013

=== 2013 ===
On 9 February 2013, Mateo was chosen to play for the NRL All Stars off the interchange bench in the 28–12 win over the Indigenous All Stars at Suncorp Stadium. On 21 April 2013, Mateo played for NSW City Origin against NSW Country Origin at lock in the 18–12 win at Coffs Harbour. In Round 10, against the Penrith Panthers, Mateo played his 150th NRL match in the Warriors 6–62 loss at Penrith Stadium. On 16 May 2013 Mateo re-signed with the Warriors on a 3-year deal until the end of the 2016 season. Mateo played in all the Warriors 24 matches, scored a try and kicked 2 goals during the 2013 NRL season.

=== 2014 ===
In April, Mateo was dropped to New South Wales Cup for 2 matches by newly appointed head coach Andrew McFadden for poor form in the opening rounds of the season. Mateo later was reselected for the Warriors in Round 8 ANZAC Day match against the Melbourne Storm, scoring a try in the Warriors 16–10 win at AAMI Park. Mateo finished off the 2014 NRL season with him playing in 19 matches and scoring a try for the Warriors. On 28 October 2014, Mateo was granted a release from the Warriors to sign with the Manly-Warringah Sea Eagles for the 2015 and 2016 NRL seasons.

=== 2015 ===
On 23 January 2015, Mateo was named in the Sea Eagles 2015 NRL Auckland Nines squad. In Round 1 of the 2015 NRL season, Mateo made his club début for the Manly-Warringah Sea Eagles against his former club the Parramatta Eels, playing at second-row in the Sea Eagles 42–12 loss at Parramatta Stadium. In Round 3, against the Canterbury-Bankstown Bulldogs, Mateo scored his first club try for the Sea Eagles in the 16–12 loss at Brookvale Oval. In July 2015, Mateo was named as one of the 14 unwanted players for Manly beyond the 2015 season but Mateo wasn't fazed about the rumours and is determined to see out his contract and later was told that the club was happy with him to stay. In Round 24, against his former club the Parramatta Eels, Mateo played his 200th NRL match in the Sea Eagles 20–16 loss at Brookvale Oval. Mateo finished his first year with the Manly-Warringah Sea Eagles with him playing in 19 matches, scoring 2 tries and kicking 5 goals in the 2015 NRL season.

=== 2016 ===
On 1 February 2016, Mateo was named in the Sea Eagles 2016 Auckland Nines squad. On 7 May 2016, Mateo returned to International football, playing for Tonga against Samoa in the 2016 Polynesian Cup where he played at five-eighth in the 18–6 loss at Parramatta Stadium. On 22 July 2016, Mateo signed with the Salford Red Devils with immediate effect and was released from his contract with Manly. Mateo played in 3 matches for the Manly-Warringah Sea Eagles in the 2016 NRL season.

=== 2017 ===
Mateo was granted a release by Salford prior to the start of the 2017 season, with the team incorrectly spelling his name as 'Feliti' in the press release announcing his departure. In an attempt to revive his playing career, Mateo signed on with the Hills District Bulls in the Ron Massey Cup at the start of 2017, named as their starting Five-eighth in Round 1. On 28 August, Mateo was named in The 2017 Ron Massey Cup team of the year. On 30 September 2017, Mateo was one of the retired players listed to be honored before the start of the 2017 NRL Grand Final.

== Personal life ==
Mateo is eligible to represent England through his English mother, while also playing for London Broncos he obtained a British passport.
