= 2016 New Zealand Warriors season =

- NRL rank: 10th
- 2016 record: Wins: 10; draws: 0; losses: 14

Team information
- CEO: Jim Doyle
- Coach: Andrew McFadden
- Assistant coach: Justin Morgan; Andrew Webster
- Captains: Ryan Hoffman; Simon Mannering
- Stadium: Mount Smart Stadium
- Avg. attendance: 14,302

Top scorers
- Tries: Solomone Kata (15)
- Points: Shaun Johnson (125)
← 2015	2017 →

The 2016 New Zealand Warriors season was the 22nd season in the club's history. Coached by Andrew McFadden and captained by Ryan Hoffman, the Warriors competed in the National Rugby League's 2016 Telstra Premiership and the 2016 NRL Auckland Nines tournament.

== Milestones ==
- Simon Mannering and Roger Tuivasa-Sheck were named to play for the World All Stars in the 2016 All Stars match. They both later withdrew and were replaced by Ryan Hoffman and Konrad Hurrell. Hurrell scored a try as the World All-Stars won 12–8.
- 17 February: Simon Mannering announced he had decided to step down as club captain. He was replaced by Ryan Hoffman.
- 19 February: The Warriors announced that they had signed an agreement with Regional Facilities Auckland extending their contract to use Mount Smart Stadium until the end of 2028.
- 5 March - round 1: Roger Tuivasa-Sheck, Blake Ayshford, Jeff Robson, Issac Luke, Nathaniel Roache and James Gavet all made their debuts for the club. It was also Roache's NRL debut.
- 20 March - round 3: Jazz Tevaga made his NRL debut.
- 3 April - round 5: Jacob Lillyman played in his 150th match for the Warriors.
- 16 April - round 7: Ligi Sao made his Warriors debut.
- 1 May - round 9: Toafofoa Sipley made his NRL debut and Shaun Lane played his first match for the Warriors.
- 6 May: Shaun Johnson played for the New Zealand national rugby league team in the 2016 Anzac Test.
- 7 May: Erin Clark played for Samoa while David Fusitua and Solomone Kata played for Tonga. Ata Hingano, Nathaniel Roache, Marata Niukore and Isaiah Papalii represented the Junior Kiwis.
- June–July: Jacob Lillyman served as 18th man for Queensland in game one of the 2016 State of Origin series and came from the bench in game two and three.
- 11 June - round 14: Issac Luke played in his 200th NRL match.
- 2 July - round 17: Simon Mannering played in his 250th NRL match, all for the Warriors. Bunty Afoa made his NRL debut. It was also the Warriors 250th first grade match at Mount Smart Stadium.
- 20 August - round 24: Ata Hingano made his first grade debut.
- 28 August - round 25: Tuimoala Lolohea scored the 2,000th try in the club's history.
- 8 October: Ken Maumalo, Mason Lino, Erin Clark, Sam Lisone, Bunty Afoa and James Gavet represented Samoa in a test match against Fiji.
- October–November: David Fusitu'a, Solomone Kata, Thomas Leuluai, Shaun Johnson, Issac Luke and Simon Mannering were named in the New Zealand squad for the 2016 Rugby League Four Nations.

== Jersey and sponsors ==
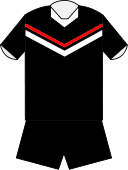

In 2016 the Warriors jerseys were again made by Canterbury of New Zealand.

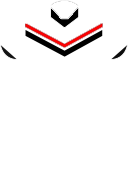

== Fixtures ==
=== Pre-season training ===
Pre-season training began on 2 November 2015, with the exception of players involved in the New Zealand Kiwis tour of Great Britain.

=== Auckland Nines ===
The Warriors competed in the 2016 NRL Auckland Nines, losing to the Parramatta Eels 4-22 in the final. The squad for the tournament was Roger Tuivasa-Sheck, Ryan Hoffman, Jacob Lillyman, Nathaniel Roache, Solomone Kata, Tuimoala Lolohea, Shaun Johnson (c), Charlie Gubb, Henare Wells, Konrad Hurrell, Ben Matulino, Ken Maumalo, Jonathan Wright, Jeff Robson, Sam Lisone, Blake Ayshford, Albert Vete and Ata Hingano. David Fusitu'a was originally named but withdrew due to injury and was replaced by Nathaniel Roache.

Shaun Johnson and Tuimoala Lolohea were named in the team of the tournament.

Hunua Pool
Team	Pld	W	D	L	PF	PA	PD	Pts
New Zealand Warriors	3	2	0	1	61	31	+30	4
Manly Warringah Sea Eagles	3	2	0	1	34	34	0	4
Canterbury-Bankstown Bulldogs	3	2	0	1	37	55	−18	4
Brisbane Broncos	3	0	0	3	29	41	−12	0

Quarter-Finals
Parramatta Eels	12
Newcastle Knights	8
Melbourne Storm	14
North Queensland Cowboys	6
New Zealand Warriors	16
Canberra Raiders	8
Manly Sea Eagles	4
Gold Coast Titans	24

Semi-Finals
Parramatta Eels	17
Melbourne Storm	8
New Zealand Warriors	22
Gold Coast Titans	4

Final
Parramatta Eels	22
New Zealand Warriors	4

Date	Round	Opponent	Venue	Result	Score	Tries	Goals	Report
6 February	Game 5	Canterbury-Bankstown Bulldogs	Eden Park, Auckland	Win	34 – 8	Roache (2), Johnson, Kata, Robson	Johnson (3), Robson	
6 February	Game 13	Manly-Warringah Sea Eagles	Eden Park, Auckland	Loss	12 – 15	Maumalo, Hingano	Johnson (2)	
7 February	Game 22	Brisbane Broncos	Eden Park, Auckland	Win	15 – 8	Roache, Wells, Johnson	Johnson (1)	
7 February	Quarter Final	Canberra Raiders	Eden Park, Auckland	Win	16 – 8	Kata (2), Wright, Wells		
7 February	Semi Final	Gold Coast Titans	Eden Park, Auckland	Win	22 – 4	Robson, Wright, Kata, Lolohea	Lolohea (2), Robson	
7 February	Final	Parramatta Eels	Eden Park, Auckland	Loss	4 - 22	Tuivasa-Sheck		

=== Pre-season matches ===
Date	Round	Opponent	Venue	Result	Score	Tries	Goals	Attendance	Report
13 February	Trial 1	Gold Coast Titans	Toll Stadium, Whangārei	Win	40-18	Faitala-Mariner (3), Tyrell (2), Afoa (2)	Luke (2), Hingano (4)		
20 February	Trial 2	St George Illawarra Dragons	Trafalgar Park, Nelson	Loss	10-46	Kata, Wright	Lolohea	10,400	

=== Regular season ===
Home matches were played at Mount Smart Stadium in Auckland with the exception of one home game which was played at Yarrow Stadium in New Plymouth. Two away games were also played in New Zealand.

Date	Round	Opponent	Venue	Result	Score	Tries	Goals	Attendance	Report
5 March	Round 1	Wests Tigers	Campbelltown Stadium, Sydney	Loss	26-34	Kata (2), Mannering, Thompson, Johnson	Lolohea (3)	10,917	
11 March	Round 2	Brisbane Broncos	Suncorp Stadium, Brisbane	Loss	10-25	Luke	Johnson (3)	35,230	
20 March	Round 3	Melbourne Storm	Mt Smart Stadium, Auckland	Loss	14-21	Lolohea, Kata, Wright	Johnson (1)	16,214	
28 March	Round 4	Newcastle Knights	Mt Smart Stadium, Auckland	Win	40-18	Kata, Matulino, Ayshford, Lolohea, Vatuvei, Johnson, Luke	Johnson (6)	13,895	
3 April	Round 5	Sydney Roosters	Central Coast Stadium, Gosford	Win	32-28 (g.pt)	Kata (2), Johnson (2), Vatuvei, Tuivasa-Sheck	Johnson (4)	10,113	
9 April	Round 6	Manly Warringah Sea Eagles	Mt Smart Stadium, Auckland	Loss	18-34	Ayshford, Luke, Kata	Johnson (3)	16,112	
16 April	Round 7	Canterbury Bankstown Bulldogs	Westpac Stadium, Wellington	Win	24-20	Ayshford (2), Fusitu'a, Wright, Lolohea	Johnson (2)	18,212	
25 April	Round 8	Melbourne Storm	AAMI Park, Melbourne	Loss	0-42			21,233	
1 May	Round 9	St George Illawarra Dragons	Mt Smart Stadium, Auckland	Win	26-10	Johnson, Allwood, Gubb, Robson	Johnson (5)	12,752	
14 May	Round 10	Penrith Panthers	AMI Stadium, Christchurch	Loss	18-30	Kata, Wright, Ayshford	Johnson (3)	18,000	
21 May	Round 11	Canberra Raiders	Yarrow Stadium, New Plymouth	Loss	12-38	Johnson, Ayshford	Johnson (2)	12,833	
	Round 12	Bye							
4 June	Round 13	Brisbane Broncos	Mt Smart Stadium, Auckland	Win	36-18	Fusitu’a (2), Johnson, Thompson, Lillyman, Hoffman, Kata	Johnson (4)	15,097	
11 June	Round 14	Newcastle Knights	Hunter Stadium, Newcastle	Win	50-14	Fusitu'a (4), Vete (2), Vatuvei, Thompson, Kata	Johnson (5), Luke (2)	12,222	
19 June	Round 15	Sydney Roosters	Mt Smart Stadium, Auckland	Win	12-10	Johnson	Luke (4)	14,026	
25 June	Round 16	Cronulla Sutherland Sharks	Shark Park, Sydney	Loss	18-19 (g.pt)	Ayshford, Wright, Leuluai	Luke (3)	12,074	
2 July	Round 17	Gold Coast Titans	Mt Smart Stadium, Auckland	Win	27-18	Ayshford, Lolohea, Johnson, Thompson	Luke (5), Johnson (FG)	15,107	
	Round 18	Bye							
16 July	Round 19	Manly Warringah Sea Eagles	nib Stadium, Perth	Loss	14-15 (g.pt)	Afoa (2)	Luke (3)	11,109	
23 July	Round 20	Canberra Raiders	GIO Stadium, Canberra	Loss	22-26 (g.pt)	Leuluai (2), Vatuvei, Fusitu'a	Luke (3)	9,471	
30 July	Round 21	Penrith Panthers	Mt Smart Stadium, Auckland	Win	20-16 (g.pt)	Fusitu'a (2), Maumalo, Johnson	Luke (2)	13,026	
7 August	Round 22	Gold Coast Titans	Cbus Super Stadium, Gold Coast	Win	24-14	Kata (2), Fusitu'a, Thompson, Mannering	Lolohea (2)	25,109	
13 August	Round 23	South Sydney Rabbitohs	Mt Smart Stadium, Auckland	Loss	22-41	Kata (2), Vatuvei, Tevaga	Johnson (3)	17,409	
20 August	Round 24	North Queensland Cowboys	1300SMILES Stadium, Townsville	Loss	6-34	Hoffman	Johnson (1)	15,676	
28 August	Round 25	Wests Tigers	Mt Smart Stadium, Auckland	Loss	24-36	Thompson, Kata, Mannering, Lolohea	Luke (3), Hingano (1)	14,020	
4 September	Round 26	Parramatta Eels	Mt Smart Stadium, Auckland	Loss	18-40	Mannering (2), Vatuvei	Luke (3)	11,129	

== Ladder ==
2016 NRL season
Pos	Team	Pld	W	D	L	B	PF	PA	PD	Pts
1	Melbourne Storm	24	19	0	5	2	563	302	+261	42
2	Canberra Raiders	24	17	1	6	2	688	456	+232	39
3	Cronulla-Sutherland Sharks (P)	24	17	1	6	2	580	404	+176	39
4	North Queensland Cowboys	24	15	0	9	2	584	355	+229	34
5	Brisbane Broncos	24	15	0	9	2	554	434	+120	34
6	Penrith Panthers	24	14	0	10	2	563	463	+100	32
7	Canterbury-Bankstown Bulldogs	24	14	0	10	2	506	448	+58	32
8	Gold Coast Titans	24	11	1	12	2	508	497	+11	27
9	Wests Tigers	24	11	0	13	2	499	607	−108	26
10	New Zealand Warriors	24	10	0	14	2	513	601	−88	24
11	St. George Illawarra Dragons	24	10	0	14	2	341	538	−197	24
12	South Sydney Rabbitohs	24	9	0	15	2	473	549	−76	22
13	Manly-Warringah Sea Eagles	24	8	0	16	2	454	563	−109	20
14	Parramatta Eels	24	13	0	11	2	298	324	−26	18^{1}
15	Sydney Roosters	24	6	0	18	2	443	576	−133	16
16	Newcastle Knights	24	1	1	22	2	305	800	−495	7

^{1} Parramatta were deducted 12 competition points and their for/against tally accumulated between rounds 1-9 for gross long-term salary cap breaches.

== Squad ==
No.	Name	Position	Warriors debut	App	T	G	FG	Pts
55	Ali Lauitiiti	SR	19 April 1998	0	0	0	0	0
105	Thomas Leuluai	HB	2 May 2003	18	3	0	0	12
115	Manu Vatuvei	WG	23 May 2004	15	6	0	0	24
125	Simon Mannering	SR	26 June 2005	22	5	0	0	20
142	Ben Matulino	PR	14 June 2008	23	1	0	0	4
146	Jacob Lillyman	PR	14 March 2009	22	1	0	0	4
159	Sione Lousi	SR	14 March 2010	1	0	0	0	0
168	Shaun Johnson	HB	4 June 2011	24	10	42	1	125
171	Ben Henry	SR	4 March 2012	1	0	0	0	0
173	Konrad Hurrell	CE	4 March 2012	3	0	0	0	0
183	Charlie Gubb	PR	7 July 2013	14	1	0	0	4
188	John Palavi	PR	9 March 2014	3	0	0	0	0
189	David Fusitua	WG	15 March 2014	18	11	0	0	44
192	Tuimoala Lolohea	HB	27 July 2014	22	5	5	0	30
193	Solomone Kata	CE	7 March 2015	21	15	0	0	60
194	Bodene Thompson	SR	7 March 2015	18	6	0	0	24
195	Ryan Hoffman	SR	7 March 2015	23	2	0	0	8
196	Sam Lisone	PR	7 March 2015	21	0	0	0	0
197	Albert Vete	PR	7 March 2015	15	2	0	0	8
198	Jonathan Wright	WG	15 March 2015	9	4	0	0	16
199	Matt Allwood	CE	29 March 2015	4	1	0	0	4
200	Raymond Faitala-Mariner	SR	25 April 2015	1	0	0	0	0
201	Ken Maumalo	WG	16 May 2015	10	1	0	0	4
202	Mason Lino	HB	24 August 2015	0	0	0	0	0
203	Roger Tuivasa-Sheck	FB	5 March 2016	7	1	0	0	4
204	Blake Ayshford	CE	5 March 2016	23	8	0	0	32
205	Jeff Robson	HB	5 March 2016	7	1	0	0	4
206	Issac Luke	HK	5 March 2016	20	3	28	0	68
207	Nathaniel Roache	HK	5 March 2016	11	0	0	0	0
208	James Gavet	PR	5 March 2016	10	0	0	0	0
209	Jazz Tevaga	HK	20 March 2016	11	1	0	0	4
210	Ligi Sao	LK	16 April 2016	2	0	0	0	0
211	Shaun Lane	SR	1 May 2016	1	0	0	0	0
212	Toafofoa Sipley	PR	1 May 2016	2	0	0	0	0
213	Bunty Afoa	PR	2 July 2016	4	2	0	0	8
214	Ata Hingano	FE	20 August 2016	2	0	1	0	2
	Henare Wells	FB		0	0	0	0	0
	Charnze Nicoll-Klokstad	UB		0	0	0	0	0

== Staff ==
- Chief executive officer: Jim Doyle
- Media and communications manager: Richard Becht
- Football operations manager: Dan Floyd
- Team manager: Laurie Hale
- Head of medical services: John Mayhew
- Recuritment and development manager: Tony Iro
- Welfare and education manager: Jerry Seuseu
- Academy and pathways manager: Duane Mann

=== Coaching staff ===
- NRL head coach: Andrew McFadden
- NRL assistant coach: Justin Morgan
- NRL assistant coach: Andrew Webster
- NSW Cup head coach: Stacey Jones
- NSW Cup assistant coach: Ricky Henry
- NYC head coach: Kelvin Wright
- NYC assistant coach: Boycie Nelson

== Transfers ==
=== Gains ===
Player	Previous club	Length	Notes
Issac Luke	South Sydney Rabbitohs	3 years	
Roger Tuivasa-Sheck	Sydney Roosters	3 years	
Ligi Sao	Manly Sea Eagles	2 years	
Blake Ayshford	Cronulla-Sutherland Sharks	2 years	
Henare Wells	Burleigh Bears		
Jeff Robson	Cronulla-Sutherland Sharks	1 year	
Charnze Nicoll-Klokstad	Melbourne Storm	2 years	
Ali Lauitiiti	Wakefield Trinity Wildcats	1 year	
James Gavet	Brisbane Broncos	1 year	
Shaun Lane	Canterbury-Bankstown Bulldogs	1 year	2016 mid-season

=== Losses ===
Player	Club	Notes
Suaia Matagi	Sydney Roosters	2015 mid-season
Nathaniel Peteru	Gold Coast Titans	2015 mid-season
Api Pewhairangi	Connacht (RU)	2015 mid-season
Ngani Laumape	Hurricanes (RU)	2015 mid-season
Sam Rapira	Huddersfield Giants	
Nathan Friend	Gold Coast Titans	
Dominique Peyroux	St. Helens	
Sam Tomkins	Wigan Warriors	
Chad Townsend	Cronulla Sharks	
Siliva Havili	St. George-Illawarra Dragons	
Brad Abbey	Canterbury Bulldogs	
Glen Fisiiahi	Chiefs (RU)	
Sebastine Ikahihifo	St. George-Illawarra Dragons	
David Bhana	Newcastle Knights	
Raymond Faitala-Mariner	Canterbury-Bankstown Bulldogs	2016 mid-season
Konrad Hurrell	Gold Coast Titans	2016 mid-season
Jeff Robson	Parramatta Eels	2016 mid-season

== Other teams ==
As in 2015, the Warriors entered a team into the Intrust Super Premiership NSW and the Junior Warriors competed in the Holden Cup.

=== Intrust Super Premiership NSW squad ===
The Warriors finished 5th in the regular season, before defeating the Penrith Panthers 21-14 in an elimination final. They then lost 18-22 to the Newtown Jets in a semi-final.

John Palavi and Upu Poching played in their 50th NSW Cup matches for the Warriors, becoming the first players to reach this milestone for the club.

Qualifying and elimination finals
Pepper Stadium
1	Mounties	30
4	Jets	12
Mt Smart Stadium
5	Warriors	21
8	Panthers	14
Pepper Stadium
6	Roos	19
7	Bulldogs	18
Jubilee Oval
2	Cutters	32
3	Tigers	22

Semi-finals
Pepper Stadium
Jets	22
Warriors	18
Pepper Stadium
Tigers	26
Roos	16

Preliminary finals
Leichhardt Oval
Mounties	24
Tigers	18
Leichhardt Oval
Cutters	18
Jets	10

Grand final
Pirtek Stadium
Mounties	20
Cutters	21

=== Holden Cup squad ===
The Junior Warriors finished the season in 14th position, with 8 wins, a draw, and 15 losses.

== Club awards ==
Simon Mannering was named the club's player of the year for a record fifth time. He was also named the clubman of the year. Shaun Johnson won the people's choice award while Nathaniel Roache was the NRL rookie of the year.

Ryan Hoffman was named in the NRL-RLPA academic team of the year, as he was completing a Bachelor of Business. Ben Henry also won a Pasifika leadership and excellence award, which included travel to the University of California, Los Angeles (UCLA) to attend lectures.

Charnze Nicoll-Klokstad was the Intrust Super Premiership NSW player of the year, while James Bell was the teams man of the year.

Chris Sio was the Junior Warriors player of the year and Chanel Harris-Tavita was the Junior Warriors rookie of the year.

Journalist Allen McLaughlin was also awarded a legacy award, after covering all but one of the club's 254 games at the venue since 1995.
