= 2016 NRL Auckland Nines =

Rugby tournament

Tournament information
- Location: Eden Park, Auckland
- Dates: 6–7 February
- Teams: 16 Male; 2 Female

Final positions
- Champions: ~~Parramatta Eels~~
- Runner-up: New Zealand Warriors

Tournament statistics
- Matches played: 31 Male; 3 Female
- Points scored: 894 Male; 52 Female
- Tries scored: 179 Male; 10 Female
- MVP: Corey Norman
- Top scorer: Bevan French (34)
- Top try scorer: Bevan French (8)

The 2016 NRL Auckland Nines (known as the Downer NRL Auckland Nines due to sponsorship) was the third NRL Auckland Nines competition. It was held on 6–7 February 2016 at Eden Park in Auckland, New Zealand. As with previous tournaments, it was contested by all sixteen National Rugby League teams. The prize money was NZ$2.6 million. The draw was released on 18 November 2015. The same pool names were used as the 2015 tournament's. The pool names were: Hunua, Waiheke, Rangitoto and Piha. The event included two international women's teams, the Kiwiferns and the Jillaroos, who competed in a three-game series. Originally to be sponsored by Dick Smith, the tournament was instead sponsored by Downer Group after Dick Smith went into receivership. The Parramatta Eels who won the tournament were later stripped of the title due to salary cap breaches.

== Tournament games ==
=== Hunua pool ===
Hunua Pool
Team	Pld	W	D	L	PF	PA	PD	Pts
New Zealand Warriors	3	2	0	1	61	31	+30	4
Manly Warringah Sea Eagles	3	2	0	1	34	34	0	4
Canterbury-Bankstown Bulldogs	3	2	0	1	37	55	−18	4
Brisbane Broncos	3	0	0	3	29	41	−12	0

6 February 2016	New Zealand Warriors	34 – 8	Canterbury Bulldogs	Auckland, New Zealand
14:20 NZDT	Bonus Point Tries: Nathaniel Roache 17', Shaun Johnson 18'; Tries: Solomone Kata 13', 15', Nathaniel Roache 9', Jeff Robson 11'; Conversions: Shaun Johnson 3/4, Jeff Robson 1/1, Tuimoala Lolohea 0/1	[Report Report]	Tries: Tyrone Phillips 5', Shaun Lane 8'; Conversions: Dane Chisholm 0/1, Kerrod Holland 0/1	Stadium: Eden Park

6 February 2016	Manly-Warringah Sea Eagles	11 – 8	Brisbane Broncos	Auckland, New Zealand
14:45 NZDT	Bonus Point Tries: Jake Trbojevic 10'; Tries: Matt Parcell 18'; Conversions: Tom Trbojevic 1/1, Jake Trbojevic 0/1	[Report Report]	Tries: Tom Opacic 3', 12'; Conversions: Sam Thaiday 0/1, Jamayne Isaako 0/1	Stadium: Eden Park

6 February 2016	New Zealand Warriors	12 – 15	Manly-Warringah Sea Eagles	Auckland, New Zealand
18:15 NZDT	Tries: Ken Maumalo 4', Mafoa'aeata Hingano 9'; Conversions: Shaun Johnson 2/2	[Report Report]	Bonus Point Tries: Matt Parcell 16'; Tries: Brayden Wiliame 2', Tom Trbojevic 14'; Conversions: Tom Trbojevic 1/2, Isaac John 0/1	Stadium: Eden Park

6 February 2016	Canterbury Bulldogs	15 – 13	Brisbane Broncos	Auckland, New Zealand
18:40 NZDT	Bonus Point Tries: Tyrone Phillips 9'; Tries: Shaun Lane 3', Jarrod McInally 6'; Conversions: Kerrod Holland 1/1, Dane Chisholm 0/1, Bradley Abbey 0/1	[Report Report]	Bonus Point Tries: Andrew McCullough 16'; Tries: Jai Arrow 13'; Conversions: Caleb Timu 2/2	Stadium: Eden Park

7 February 2016	Canterbury Bulldogs	14 – 8	Manly-Warringah Sea Eagles	Auckland, New Zealand
12:15 NZDT	Tries: Jarrod McInally 3', Tyrone Phillips 7', Dane Chisholm 18'; Conversions: Matt Frawley 1/2, Sam Kasiano 0/1	[Report Report]	Tries: Tony Satini 5', Halauafu Lavaka 12'; Conversions: Feleti Mateo 0/1, Tom Trbojevic 0/1	Stadium: Eden Park

7 February 2016	New Zealand Warriors	15 – 8	Brisbane Broncos	Auckland, New Zealand
12:40 NZDT	Bonus Point Tries: Shaun Johnson 18'; Tries: Nathaniel Roache 6', Henare Wells 11'; Conversions: Shaun Johnson 1/3	[Report Report]	Tries: Jamayne Isaako 3', Todd Murphy 9'; Conversions: Jamayne Isaako 0/2	Stadium: Eden Park

=== Rangitoto pool ===
Rangitoto Pool
Team	Pld	W	D	L	PF	PA	PD	Pts
North Queensland Cowboys	3	2	0	1	55	36	+19	4
Newcastle Knights	3	2	0	1	48	58	−10	4
Penrith Panthers	3	1	0	2	48	37	+11	2
Wests Tigers	3	1	0	2	36	56	−20	2

6 February 2016	Newcastle Knights	12 – 28	North Queensland Cowboys	Auckland, New Zealand
13:20 NZDT	Tries: Brock Lamb 13', Danny Levi 16'; Conversions: Brock Lamb 2/2	[Report Report]	Tries: Gavin Cooper 7', 11', 18', Gideon Gela-Mosby 3', 8', Justin O'Neill 5'; Conversions: Lachlan Coote 1/2, Matt Bowen 1/2, Gavin Cooper 0/1, Michael Morgan 0/1	Stadium: Eden Park

6 February 2016	Penrith Panthers	23 – 7	Wests Tigers	Auckland, New Zealand
13:45 NZDT	Bonus Point Tries: Waqa Blake 18'; Tries: Waqa Blake 6', 11', Dallin Watene-Zelezniak 3', Josh Mansour 8'; Conversions: Bryce Cartwright 1/2, Te Maire Martin 1/1, Will Smith 0/1, Corey Harawira-Naera 0/1	[Report Report]	Bonus Point Tries: Tim Simona 17'; Conversions: Manaia Cherrington 1/1	Stadium: Eden Park

6 February 2016	Newcastle Knights	15 – 14	Penrith Panthers	Auckland, New Zealand
17:15 NZDT	Bonus Point Tries: Jake Mamo 11'; Tries: Chanel Mata'utia 1', Jake Mamo 7'; Conversions: Danny Levi 1/1, Brock Lamb 0/2	[Report Report]	Tries: Zach Dockar-Clay 6', Jeremy Latimore 13', Robert Jennings 14'; Conversions: Will Smith 1/1, Corey Harawira-Naera 0/1, Te Maire Martin 0/1	Stadium: Eden Park

6 February 2016	North Queensland Cowboys	12 – 13	Wests Tigers	Auckland, New Zealand
17:40 NZDT	Tries: Gideon Gela-Mosby 3', 9', Antonio Winterstein 17'; Conversions: Michael Morgan 0/3	[Report Report]	Bonus Point Tries: Manaia Cherrington 14'; Tries: Jack Littlejohn 2'; Conversions: Josh Drinkwater 1/1, Manaia Cherrington 1/1	Stadium: Eden Park

7 February 2016	Newcastle Knights	21 – 16	Wests Tigers	Auckland, New Zealand
11:20 NZDT	Bonus Point Tries: Robbie Rochow 8'; Tries: Danny Levi 6', Akuila Uate 13', Jake Mamo 16'; Conversions: Brock Lamb 2/4	[Report Report]	Tries: Josh Addo-Carr 4', 17', Manaia Cherrington 10'; Conversions: Jack Littlejohn 2/3	Stadium: Eden Park

7 February 2016	North Queensland Cowboys	15 – 11	Penrith Panthers	Auckland, New Zealand
11:50 NZDT	Bonus Point Tries: Ethan Lowe 6'; Tries: Gavin Cooper 4', Coen Hess 8'; Conversions: Lachlan Coote 1/3	[Report Report]	Bonus Point Tries: Bryce Cartwright 14'; Tries: Benjamin Garcia 2'; Conversions: Te Maire Martin 1/1, Bryce Cartwright 0/1	Stadium: Eden Park

=== Waiheke pool ===
Waiheke Pool
Team	Pld	W	D	L	PF	PA	PD	Pts
Parramatta Eels	3	2	0	1	42	36	+6	4
Melbourne Storm	3	2	0	1	39	42	−3	4
Sydney Roosters	3	1	0	2	50	35	+15	2
South Sydney Rabbitohs	3	1	0	2	37	55	−18	2

6 February 2016	Sydney Roosters	13 – 14	South Sydney Rabbitohs	Auckland, New Zealand
12:30 NZDT	Bonus Point Tries: Latrell Mitchell 4'; Tries: Braith Anasta 7', Joe Burgess 13'; Conversions: Tyler Cornish 0/1, Braith Anasta 0/1, Latrell Mitchell 0/1	[Report Report]	Tries: Alex Johnston 2', Kirisome Auva'a 9', Michael Oldfield 17'; Conversions: Damien Cook 1/2, Alex Johnston 0/1	Stadium: Eden Park

6 February 2016	Parramatta Eels	4 – 14	Melbourne Storm	Auckland, New Zealand
12:55 NZDT	Tries: Manu Maʻu 3'; Conversions: Corey Norman 0/1	[Report Report]	Tries: Cameron Munster 1', Richard Kennar 12', Blake Green 14'; Conversions: Cameron Munster 1/3	Stadium: Eden Park

6 February 2016	Sydney Roosters	11 – 14	Parramatta Eels	Auckland, New Zealand
16:25 NZDT	Tries: Latrell Mitchell 10', 14'; Conversions: Braith Anasta 2/2; Field Goals: Braith Anasta 17'	[Report Report]	Tries: Bevan French 3', 18', Semi Radradra 11'; Conversions: Corey Norman 1/2, Vai Toutai 0/1	Stadium: Eden Park

6 February 2016	South Sydney Rabbitohs	12 – 18	Melbourne Storm	Auckland, New Zealand
16:50 NZDT	Tries: John Olive 7', Hymel Hunt 11', Damien Cook 18'; Conversions: Damien Cook 0/3	[Report Report]	Tries: Kenny Bromwich 3', Nelson Asofa-Solomona 5', Curtis Scott 17'; Conversions: Cameron Munster 3/3; Field Goals: Ben Hampton 0/1	Stadium: Eden Park

7 February 2016	Sydney Roosters	26 – 7	Melbourne Storm	Auckland, New Zealand
10:35 NZDT	Bonus Point Tries: Latrell Mitchell 4', Nat Butcher 17'; Tries: Joseph Manu 12', Vincent Leuluai 14', Connor Watson 15'; Conversions: Tyler Cornish 1/4, Braith Anasta 1/1	[Report Report]	Bonus Point Tries: Richard Kennar 11'; Conversions: Cameron Munster 1/1	Stadium: Eden Park

7 February 2016	South Sydney Rabbitohs	11 – 24	Parramatta Eels	Auckland, New Zealand
11:00 NZDT	Bonus Point Tries: Cameron McInnes 10'; Tries: Bryson Goodwin 2'; Conversions: Damien Cook 1/1, Bryson Goodwin 0/1	[Report Report]	Tries: Semi Radradra 1', 18', Corey Norman 4', Bevan French 9', Vai Toutai 12'; Conversions: Corey Norman 1/3, Mitch Cornish 1/1, Tepai Moeroa 0/1	Stadium: Eden Park

=== Piha pool ===
Piha Pool
Team	Pld	W	D	L	PF	PA	PD	Pts
Gold Coast Titans	3	2	0	1	62	50	+12	4
Canberra Raiders	3	2	0	1	61	52	+9	4
Cronulla Sharks	3	2	0	1	46	38	+8	4
St. George Illawarra Dragons	3	0	0	3	40	69	−29	0

6 February 2016	St. George Illawarra Dragons	20 – 28	Canberra Raiders	Auckland, New Zealand
15:10 NZDT	Bonus Point Tries: Kurt Mann 13', Matthew Dufty 15'; Tries: Kalifa Faifai Loa 6'; Conversions: Drew Hutchison 1/1, Kurt Mann 1/1, Kalifa Faifai Loa 1/1	[Report Report]	Bonus Point Tries: Brenko Lee 12', Lachlan Croker 17'; Tries: Jordan Rapana 8', Luke Bateman 10', Kato Ottio 14', Luke Bateman 18'; Conversions: Sisa Waqa 1/2, Sam Williams 0/2, Lachlan Croker 0/1, Jordan Rapana 0/1	Stadium: Eden Park

6 February 2016	Cronulla Sharks	23 – 12	Gold Coast Titans	Auckland, New Zealand
15:35 NZDT	Bonus Point Tries: Mitch Brown 16'; Tries: Ben Barba 4', Josh Cleeland 8', Jack Bird 18'; Conversions: Jack Bird 2/2, Chad Townsend 1/2	[Report Report]	Tries: David Mead 13', Greg Bird 14'; Conversions: Tyrone Roberts 2/2	Stadium: Eden Park

6 February 2016	St. George Illawarra Dragons	8 – 17	Cronulla Sharks	Auckland, New Zealand
19:05 NZDT	Tries: Euan Aitken 5', 9'; Conversions: Drew Hutchison 0/1, Josh Dugan 0/1	[Report Report]	Bonus Point Tries: Gerard Beale 17'; Tries: Chad Townsend 3', Ben Barba 7'; Conversions: Jack Bird 2/3	Stadium: Eden Park

6 February 2016	Canberra Raiders	15 – 26	Gold Coast Titans	Auckland, New Zealand
19:30 NZDT	Bonus Point Tries: Lachlan Croker 18'; Tries: Paul Vaughan 2', Sisa Waqa 11'; Conversions: Lachlan Croker 1/1, Sam Williams 0/1, Sisa Waqa 0/1	[Report Report]	Bonus Point Tries: Agnatius Paasi 4', Nathan Davis 16'; Tries: Greg Bird 8', Tyrone Roberts 13', Shane Wright 15'; Conversions: Tyrone Roberts 2/3, Ashley Taylor 0/1, Agnatius Paasi 0/1	Stadium: Eden Park

7 February 2016	St. George Illawarra Dragons	12 – 24	Gold Coast Titans	Auckland, New Zealand
13:05 NZDT	Tries: Euan Aitken 4', 18', Kurt Mann 17'; Conversions: Drew Hutchison 0/2, Kalifa Faifai Loa 0/1	[Report Report]	Tries: Chris McQueen 2', 13', Agnatius Paasi 7', Greg Lelesiuao 10', Anthony Don 12'; Conversions: Tyrone Roberts 1/3, Daniel Mortimer 1/2	Stadium: Eden Park

7 February 2016	Canberra Raiders	18 – 6	Cronulla Sharks	Auckland, New Zealand
13:30 NZDT	Tries: Kurt Baptiste 2', Zac Santo 6', Jordan Rapana 13', Jack Williams 17'; Conversions: Sam Williams 1/1, Zac Santo 0/3	[Report Report]	Tries: Sam Tagataese 4'; Conversions: Jack Bird 1/1	Stadium: Eden Park

== Finals ==
Quarter-Finals
Parramatta Eels	12
Newcastle Knights	8
Melbourne Storm	14
North Queensland Cowboys	6
New Zealand Warriors	16
Canberra Raiders	8
Manly Sea Eagles	4
Gold Coast Titans	24

Semi-Finals
Parramatta Eels	17
Melbourne Storm	8
New Zealand Warriors	22
Gold Coast Titans	4

Final
Parramatta Eels	22
New Zealand Warriors	4

=== Quarterfinals ===
7 February 2016	Parramatta Eels	12 – 8	Newcastle Knights	Auckland, New Zealand
13:55 NZDT	Tries: Bevan French 2', 9', Semi Radradra 7'; Conversions: Corey Norman 0/2, Cameron King 0/1	[Report Report]	Tries: Jake Mamo 10', Jaelen Feeney 16'; Conversions: Brock Lamb 0/1, Will Pearsall 0/1	Stadium: Eden Park

7 February 2016	Melbourne Storm	14 – 6	North Queensland Cowboys	Auckland, New Zealand
14:20 NZDT	Tries: Richard Kennar 9', Curtis Scott 10', Ben Hampton 18'; Conversions: Brodie Croft 1/2, Cameron Munster 0/1	[Report Report]	Tries: Rory Kostjasyn 14'; Conversions: Michael Morgan 1/1	Stadium: Eden Park

7 February 2016	New Zealand Warriors	16 – 8	Canberra Raiders	Auckland, New Zealand
15:05 NZDT	Tries: Jonathan Wright 4', Solomone Kata 7', 8', Henare Wells 11'; Conversions: Shaun Johnson 0/4	[Report Report]	Tries: Zac Santo 15', Jordan Rapana 17'; Conversions: Sam Williams 0/1, Sisa Waqa 0/1	Stadium: Eden Park

7 February 2016	Manly Sea Eagles	4 – 24	Gold Coast Titans	Auckland, New Zealand
15:30 NZDT	Tries: Brayden Wiliame 6'; Conversions: Tom Trbojevic 0/1	[Report Report]	Penalty Try: David Mead 11', Chris McQueen 15'; Tries: Nene Macdonald 9', Anthony Don 17'; Conversions: Tyrone Roberts 2/3, Agnatius Paasi 1/1	Stadium: Eden Park; Referee: Gavin Badger

=== Semi-finals ===
7 February 2016	Parramatta Eels	17 – 8	Melbourne Storm	Auckland, New Zealand
16:40 NZDT	Bonus Point Tries: Bevan French 11'; Tries: Bevan French 7', Semi Radradra 16'; Conversions: Corey Norman 0/1, Mitch Cornish 2/2	[Report Report]	Tries: Richard Kennar 8', Tohu Harris 11'; Conversions: Brodie Croft 0/1, Cameron Munster 0/1	Stadium: Eden Park

7 February 2016	New Zealand Warriors	22 – 4	Gold Coast Titans	Auckland, New Zealand
17:05 NZDT	Tries: Jeff Robson 4', Jonathan Wright 5', Solomone Kata 8', Tuimoala Lolohea 18'; Conversions: Tuimoala Lolohea 2/3, Jeff Robson 1/1	[Report Report]	Tries: Agnatius Paasi 9'; Conversions: Tyrone Roberts 0/1	Stadium: Eden Park

=== Final ===
7 February 2016	Parramatta Eels	22 – 4	New Zealand Warriors	Auckland, New Zealand
18:40 NZDT	Bonus Point Tries: Bevan French 1', Cody Nelson 17'; Tries: Semi Radradra 5', Vai Toutai 13'; Conversions: Corey Norman 1/3, Cody Nelson 1/1	[Report Report]	Tries: Roger Tuivasa-Sheck 6'; Conversions: Shaun Johnson 0/1	Stadium: Eden Park

== Ferns v Jillaroos ==
6 February 2016	Kiwi Ferns	4 – 11	Australian Jillaroos	Auckland, New Zealand
16:00 NZDT	Tries: Maitua Feterika 16'; Conversions: 0/1	[Report; Highlights Report]	Bonus Point Tries: Allana Ferguson 14'; Tries: Sam Bremner 7'; Conversions: 1/2	Stadium: Eden Park

7 February 2016	Kiwi Ferns	9 – 0	Australian Jillaroos	Auckland, New Zealand
16:05 NZDT	Bonus Point Tries: Tasha Davie 12'; Tries: Mary-Jane Ale 10'; Conversions: 0/2	[Report; Highlights Report]		Stadium: Eden Park

7 February 2016	Kiwi Ferns	21 – 7	Australian Jillaroos	Auckland, New Zealand
18:45 NZDT	Bonus Point Tries: Sarina Fiso 18'; Tries: Mary-Jane Ale 7', Langi Veainu 9', Kristina Sue 13'; Conversions: 2/4	[Report; Replay Report]	Bonus Point Tries: Kody House 14'; Conversions: 1/1	Stadium: Eden Park

== Team of the tournament ==
Corey Norman was named the player of the tournament. The team of the tournament was;

Player	Club
Tom Trbojevic	Manly Warringah Sea Eagles
Corey Norman	Parramatta Eels
Bevan French	Parramatta Eels
Shaun Johnson	New Zealand Warriors
Tuimoala Lolohea	New Zealand Warriors
Agnatius Paasi	Gold Coast Titans
Tohu Harris	Melbourne Storm
Chris McQueen	Gold Coast Titans
Semi Radradra	Parramatta Eels
