= Paul Roache =

Samoa international rugby league footballer

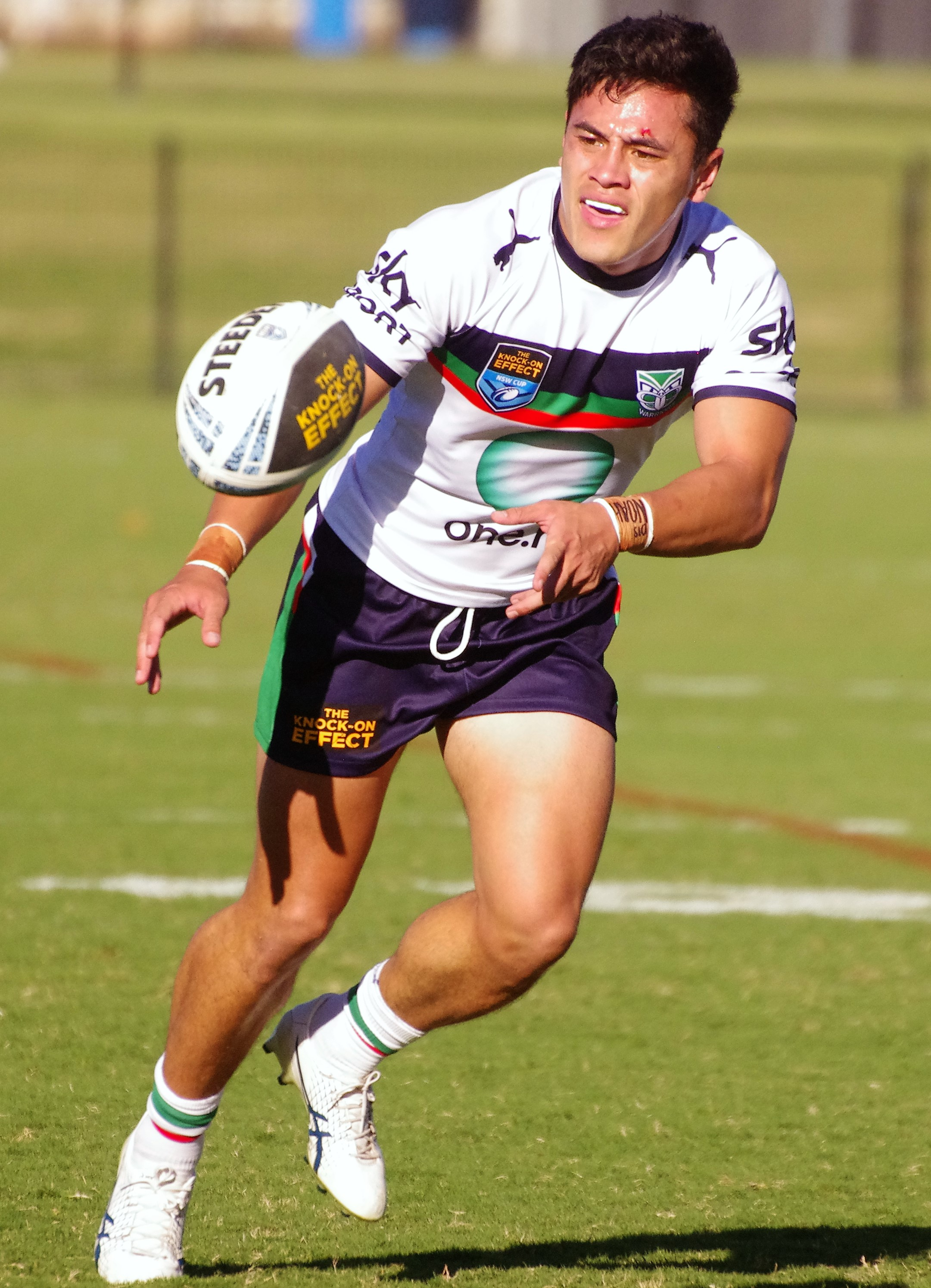

Personal information
- Full name: Paul Roache
- Born: 29 December 1998 (age 27) Apia, Samoa
- Height: 171 cm (5 ft 7 in)
- Weight: 84 kg (13 st 3 lb)

Playing information
- Position: Hooker
Club
Years	Team	Pld	T	G	FG	P
2023–25	New Zealand Warriors	4	0	0	0	0
Representative
Years	Team	Pld	T	G	FG	P
2024	Samoa	0	0	0	0	0
- Source: As of 15 November 2026
- Education: Mount Albert Grammar School
- Relatives: Abigail Roache (sister); Nathaniel Roache (brother)

Paul Roache is a Samoan rugby league footballer who last played as a hooker (yet listed as a Five-Eighth on the New Zealand Warriors website) for the New Zealand Warriors in the National Rugby League (NRL).

Roche was educated at Mount Albert Grammar School and played junior rugby league for Richmond Rovers in Auckland.

== Playing career ==
=== 2023 ===
Roache made his NRL debut in Round 27 against the Dolphins.
