= Nathaniel Roache =

New Zealand rugby league footballer

Nate Roache
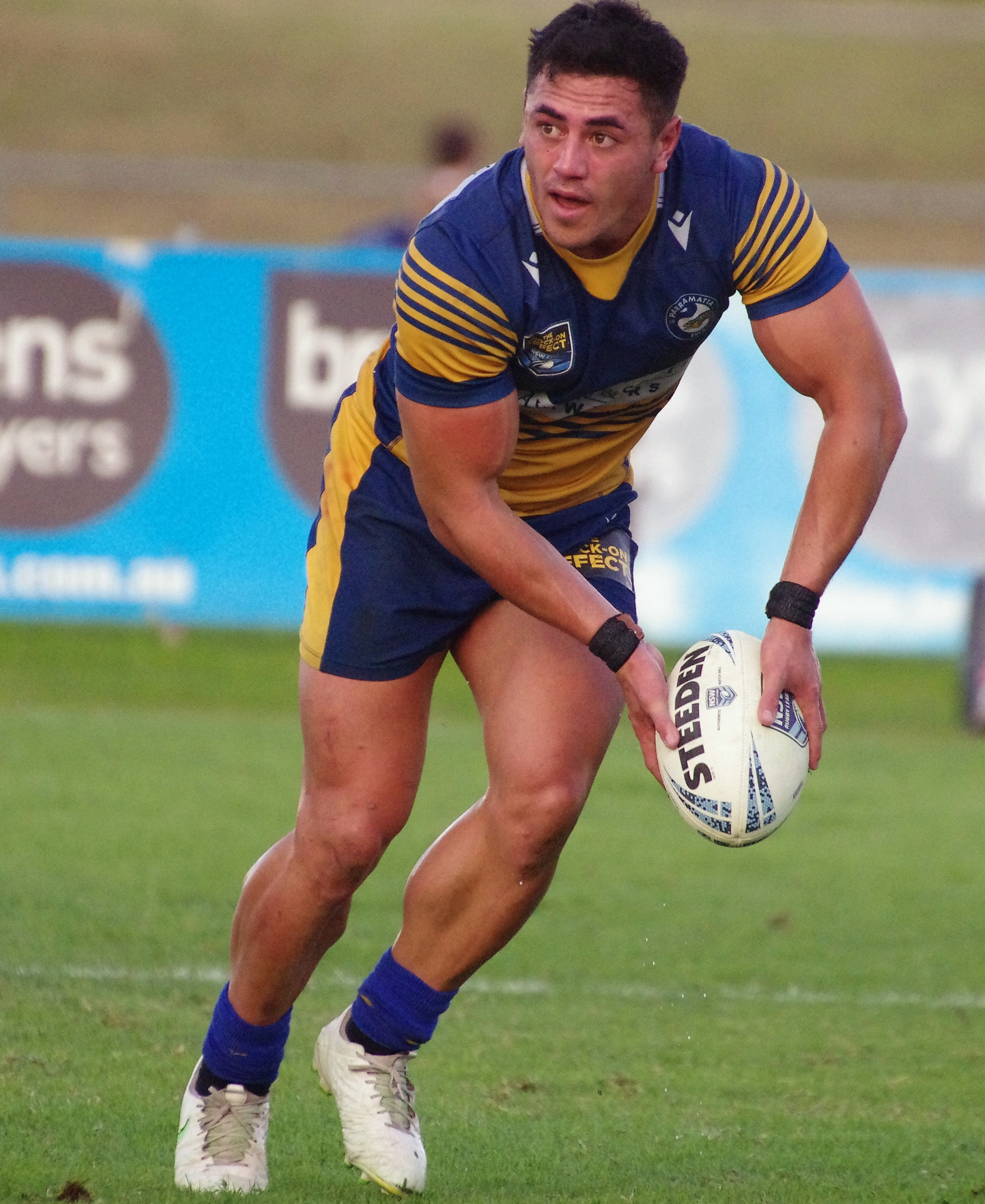

Personal information
- Full name: Nathaniel Roache
- Born: 15 April 1996 (age 30) Auckland, New Zealand
- Height: 180 cm (5 ft 11 in)
- Weight: 94 kg (14 st 11 lb)

Playing information
- Position: Hooker
Club
Years	Team	Pld	T	G	FG	P
2016–20	New Zealand Warriors	26	2	0	0	8
2021	Parramatta Eels	1	0	0	0	0
	Total	27	2	0	0	8
- Source: As of 22 November 2026
- Education: Mount Albert Grammar School
- Relatives: Abigail Roache (sister); Paul Roache (brother)

Nathaniel Roache is a New Zealand professional rugby league footballer who plays as a hooker for the North Sydney Bears in the NSW Cup.

He previously played for the New Zealand Warriors and the Parramatta Eels in the NRL.

== Background ==
Roache was born in Auckland, New Zealand and is of Samoan and Irish descent. He attended Edendale Primary School in Sandringham then Balmoral Intermediate before studying at Mount Albert Grammar School.

His junior club was Richmond Rovers.

== Playing career ==
=== Early career ===
While at Mount Albert he competed in the College Rugby League First XIII competition and the 2013 National Secondary Schools tournament, where he was named in the tournament's merit team. He played for the New Zealand Residents under-18 side in 2013 and 2014.

Signed by the New Zealand Warriors, in 2014 Roache made his Holden Cup debut for the Junior Warriors at five eighth. On 5 October 2014, Roache started at centre for the Junior Warriors in their 2014 Holden Cup Grand final against the junior Brisbane Broncos in a 34-32 victory. Early in the game he was shifted to hooker in response to an injury and received praise for his performance, which included setting up a try for Tuimoala Lolohea.

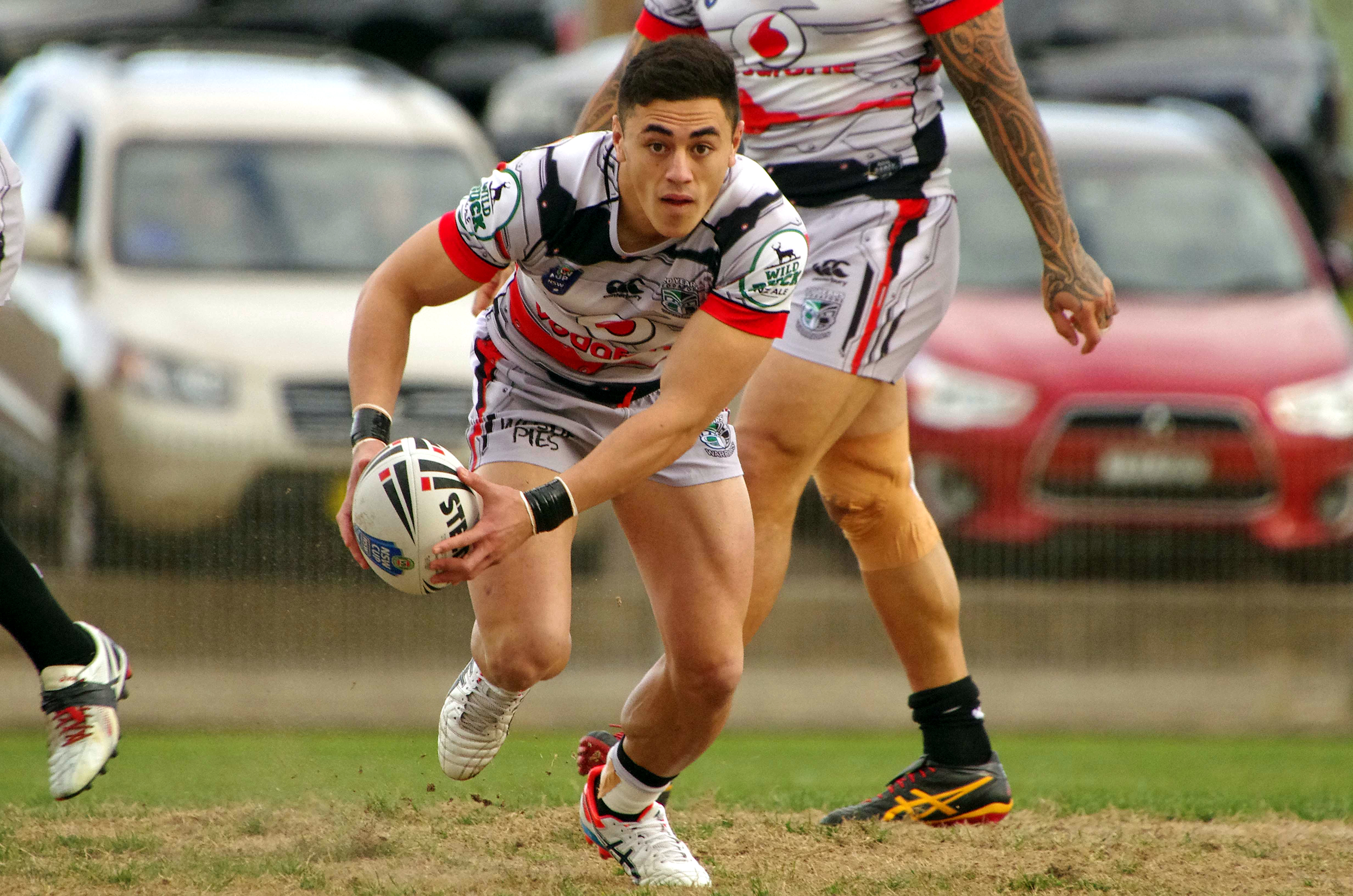
Roache playing for the Warriors in 2015

Roache played in the 2015 and 2016 NRL Auckland Nines for the Warriors. In 2015 Roache was converted to play at hooker and signed a two-year contract extension with the club.

=== 2016 ===
In Round 1 of the 2016 NRL season, Roache made his debut for the New Zealand Warriors against the Wests Tigers, playing off the interchange bench in the Warriors 26-34 loss at Campbelltown Stadium.

=== 2017 ===
In the 2017 NRL season, Roache made nine appearances as the club finished a disappointing 13th on the table.

=== 2018 ===
Roache made no appearances for New Zealand in the 2018 NRL season as the club qualified for the finals for the first time since 2011.

=== 2019 ===
Roache played six games for the New Zealand Warriors franchise in the 2019 NRL season as the club missed out on the finals.

=== 2020 ===
In November 2020, Roache signed a developmental contract with Parramatta for the 2021 season after being released by the New Zealand Warriors.

=== 2021 ===
Roache began the year playing NSW Cup coming off the bench, later starting at hooker. In round 15 2021, Roache made his Parramatta debut against the Canterbury-Bankstown Bulldogs at Bankwest Stadium. During the match, Roache injured his knee and was ruled out for an indefinite period.

=== 2022 & 2023 ===
After being released by Parramatta in November, Roache signed a train and replacement contract with Manly-Warringah. Roache made no appearances for Manly in the 2023 NRL season. Roache instead played for the clubs feeder side the Blacktown Workers Sea Eagles in the NSW Cup making 14 appearances.

=== 2024 ===
On 29 September, Roache played for North Sydney in their NSW Cup Grand Final loss against Newtown.
