= Mitch Cornish =

Australian rugby league footballer (born 1993)

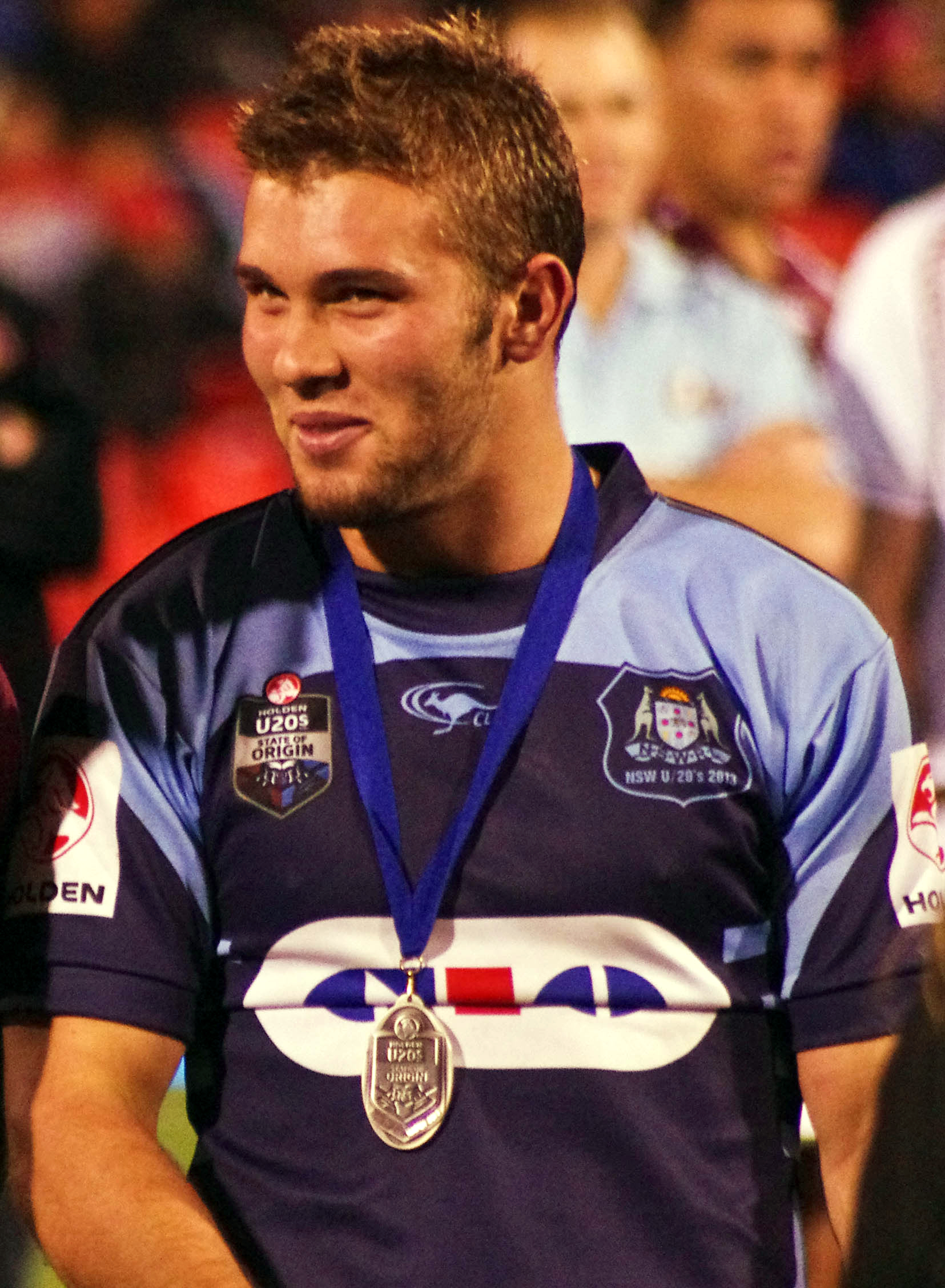

Personal information
- Full name: Mitchell Cornish
- Born: 28 January 1993 (age 33) Goulburn, New South Wales, Australia
- Height: 179 cm (5 ft 10 in)
- Weight: 87 kg (13 st 10 lb)

Playing information
- Position: Halfback, Five-eighth, Hooker
Club
Years	Team	Pld	T	G	FG	P
2014–15	Canberra Raiders	15	1	0	0	4
2017–18	Sydney Roosters	5	0	0	0	0
	Total	20	1	0	0	4
Representative
Years	Team	Pld	T	G	FG	P
2015–17	NSW Residents	2	0	0	0	0
- Source: As of 10 January 2024
- Relatives: Tyler Cornish (brother)

Mitch Cornish (born 28 January 1993) is an Australian former professional rugby league footballer who last played for the Sydney Roosters in the National Rugby League, as a five-eighth or halfback. He previously played for the Canberra Raiders.

== Background ==
Cornish was born in Goulburn, New South Wales, Australia. He is the older brother of former Gold Coast Titans player Tyler Cornish.

He played his junior rugby league for the Goulburn Stockmen, before being signed by the Canberra Raiders.

== Playing career ==
=== Early career ===
From 2011 to 2013, Cornish played for the Raiders' NYC team On 7 June 2012, he extended his contract with the Raiders from the end of 2013 to the end of 2015. On 21 August 2012, he was named at halfback in the 2012 NYC Team of the Year. On 13 October 2012, he played for the Junior Kangaroos against the Junior Kiwis, due to a late injury to Lachlan Maranta which resulted in Ben Hampton taking Maranta's spot at fullback and Cornish taking Hampton's bench spot. In November and December 2012, he attended the Blues Origin Pathways camp designed for possible future New South Wales State of Origin representatives. On 20 April 2013, he played for the New South Wales under-20s team against the Queensland under-20s team, playing at halfback and was awarded the Darren Lockyer Medal as Man of the Match in the Blues' 36–12 win at Penrith Stadium. On 27 August 2013, he was named on the interchange bench in the 2013 NYC Team of the Year, making the team for the second year in a row. On 13 October 2013, he again played for the Junior Kangaroos against the Junior Kiwis, this time co-captaining the side alongside Michael Lichaa.

=== 2014 ===
In 2014, Cornish moved on to the Raiders' New South Wales Cup team, Mount Pritchard Mounties. On 15 and 16 February, he played for the Raiders in the inaugural NRL Auckland Nines. In Round 11 of the 2014 NRL season, he made his NRL debut for the Raiders against the North Queensland Cowboys, playing off the interchange bench in the Raiders' 42–12 win at Canberra Stadium. On 9 July, he played for the New South Wales Residents against the Queensland Residents, playing at halfback in New South Wales' 24–16 loss at Suncorp Stadium. In Round 25 against the Wests Tigers at Canberra Stadium, he started at halfback in the NRL for the first time, as the Raiders went on to win 27–12. He finished off his debut year in the NRL having played in 8 matches for the Raiders.

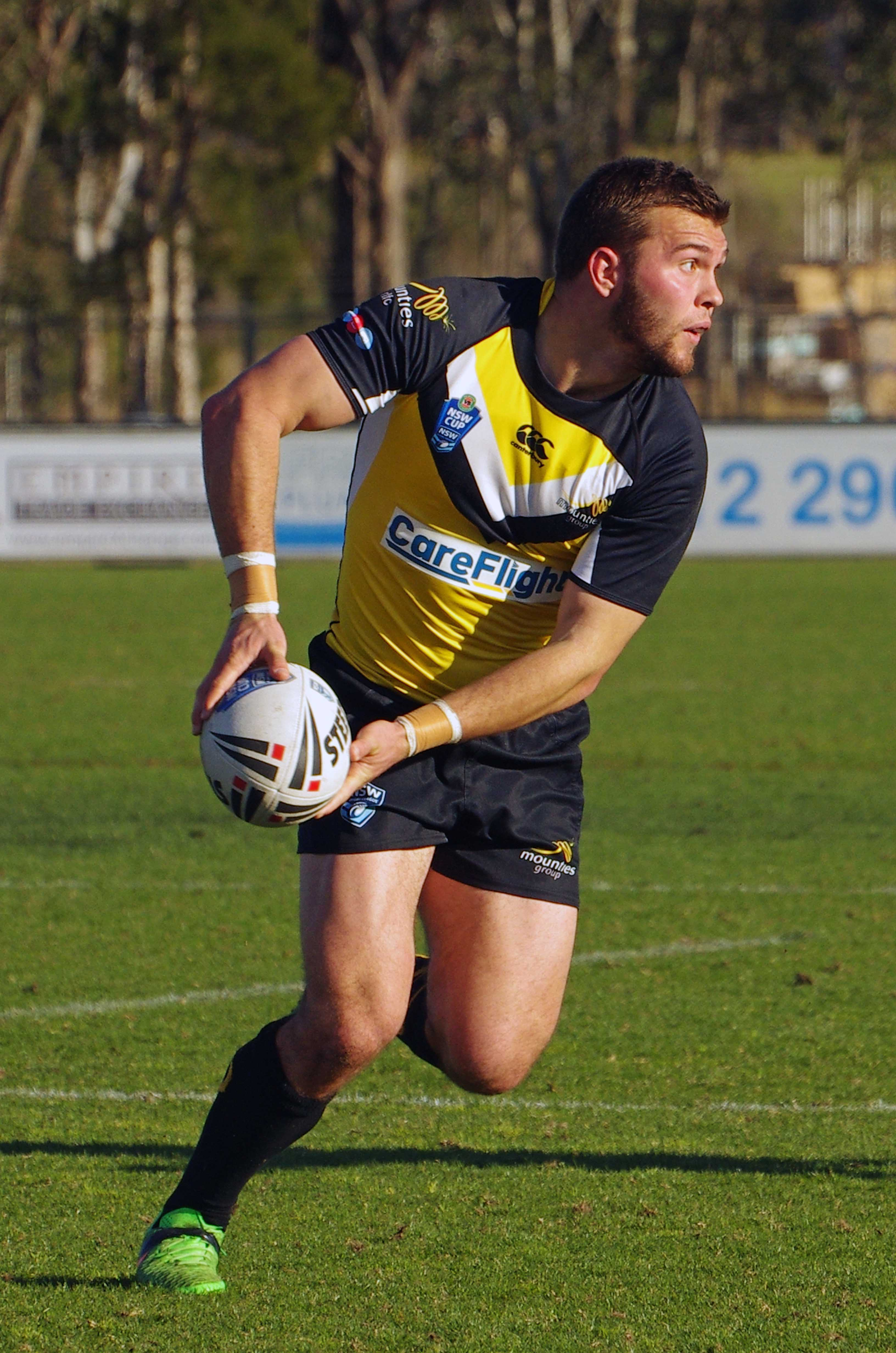
Cornish playing for the Mount Pritchard Mounties in 2015

=== 2015 ===
On 27 September, Cornish was named at halfback in the 2015 New South Wales Cup Team of the Year. On 21 October, he signed a 1-year contract with the Parramatta Eels starting in 2016.

=== 2016 ===
Cornish played for the Parramatta Eels who won the 2016 NRL Auckland Nines.

After failing to play a first-grade game for the Eels, late in the year, Cornish signed a contract with the Sydney Roosters for 2017.

=== 2017 ===
In February Cornish was selected to play in the 2017 NRL Auckland Nines. The Roosters won the final.

=== 2018 ===
On 31 October, it was announced by the Sydney Roosters that Cornish had retired from rugby league.

== Post playing ==
After retiring from the NRL Cornish had moved into the insurance industry after taking up a job on the Central Coast. In January 2024, it was announced that Cornish was appointed the Head Coach of the first grade squad for the Goulburn Bulldogs for the 2024 season.
