= Tuimoala Lolohea =

New Zealand and Tonga international rugby league footballer

Tui Lolohea
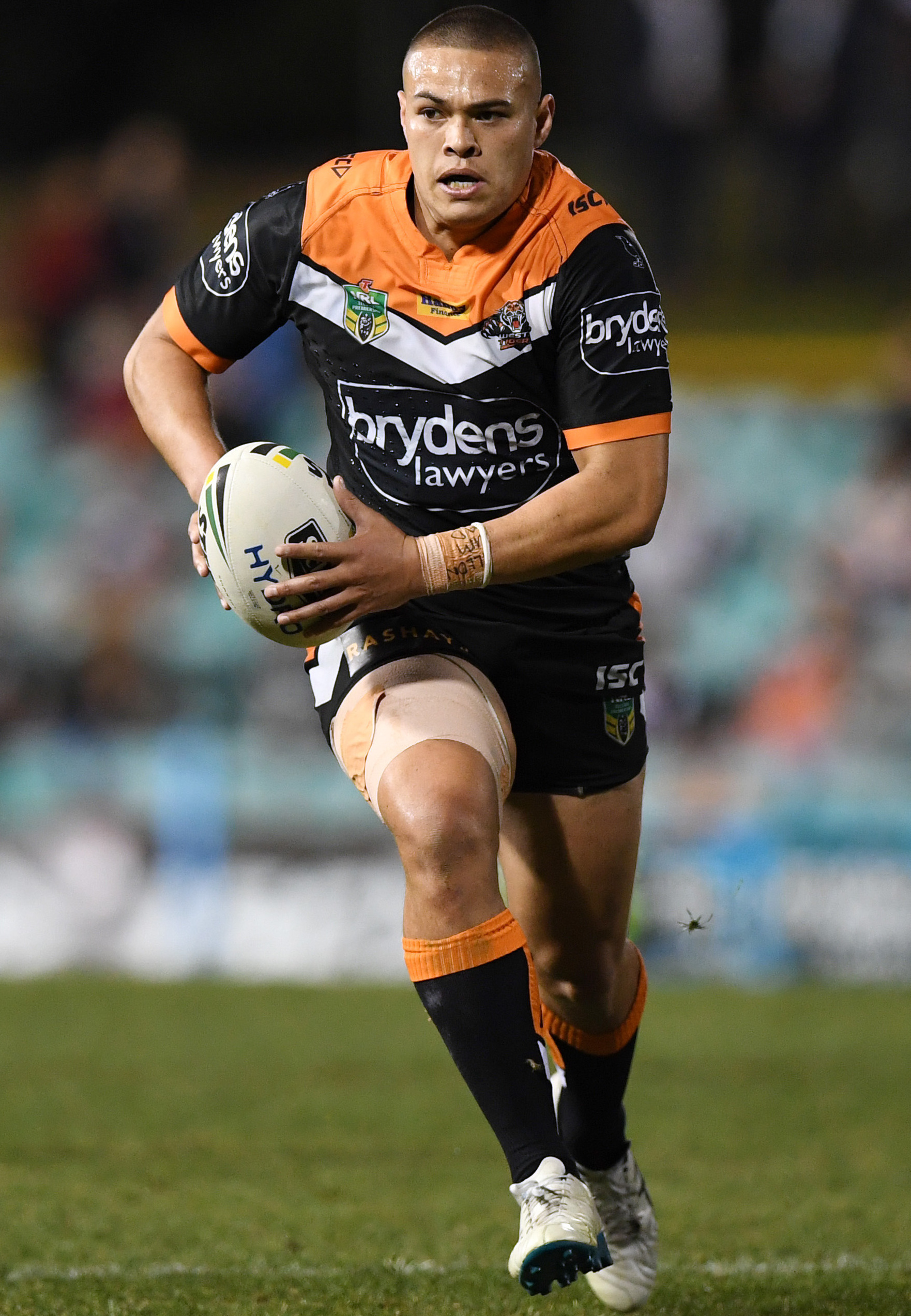

Personal information
- Full name: Tuimoala Lolohea
- Born: 23 January 1995 (age 31) Auckland, New Zealand
- Height: 5 ft 10 in (1.79 m)
- Weight: 14 st 11 lb (94 kg)

Playing information
- Position: Stand-off, Fullback, Scrum-half, Wing
Club
Years	Team	Pld	T	G	FG	P
2014–17	New Zealand Warriors	52	17	18	0	104
2017–18	Wests Tigers	19	5	47	0	114
2019	Leeds Rhinos	17	3	19	0	50
2019–21	Salford Red Devils	55	18	29	1	131
2022–	Huddersfield Giants	127	29	38	0	192
	Total	270	72	151	1	591
Representative
Years	Team	Pld	T	G	FG	P
2015–	Tonga	26	7	9	0	46
2015	New Zealand	1	0	0	0	0
- Source: As of 22 November 2026

Tuimoala Lolohea (born 23 January 1995) is a professional rugby league footballer who plays as a stand-off or fullback for the Huddersfield Giants in the Super League and Tonga at international level.

Lolohea previously played for the New Zealand Warriors and the Wests Tigers in the National Rugby League (NRL), and for both New Zealand at international level. He also played for the Salford Red Devils and the Leeds Rhinos in the Super League. He has also played as a scrum-half, winger and centre in his career.

== Background ==
Lolohea was born in Avondale, Auckland, New Zealand, and is of Tongan and Pākehā descent.

== Playing career ==
A Marist Saints junior, Lolohea is of Tongan descent and signed with the New Zealand Warriors in 2013, playing in all 28 matches in the Holden Cup. Lolohea was named the Warriors' 2013 NYC Young Player of the Year and also played for the Junior Kiwis that year. He attended Kelston Boys’ High School.

=== 2014 ===
In February, Lolohea was selected in the Warriors' 2014 NRL Auckland Nines squad. He started the season playing for the Warriors NSW Cup squad.

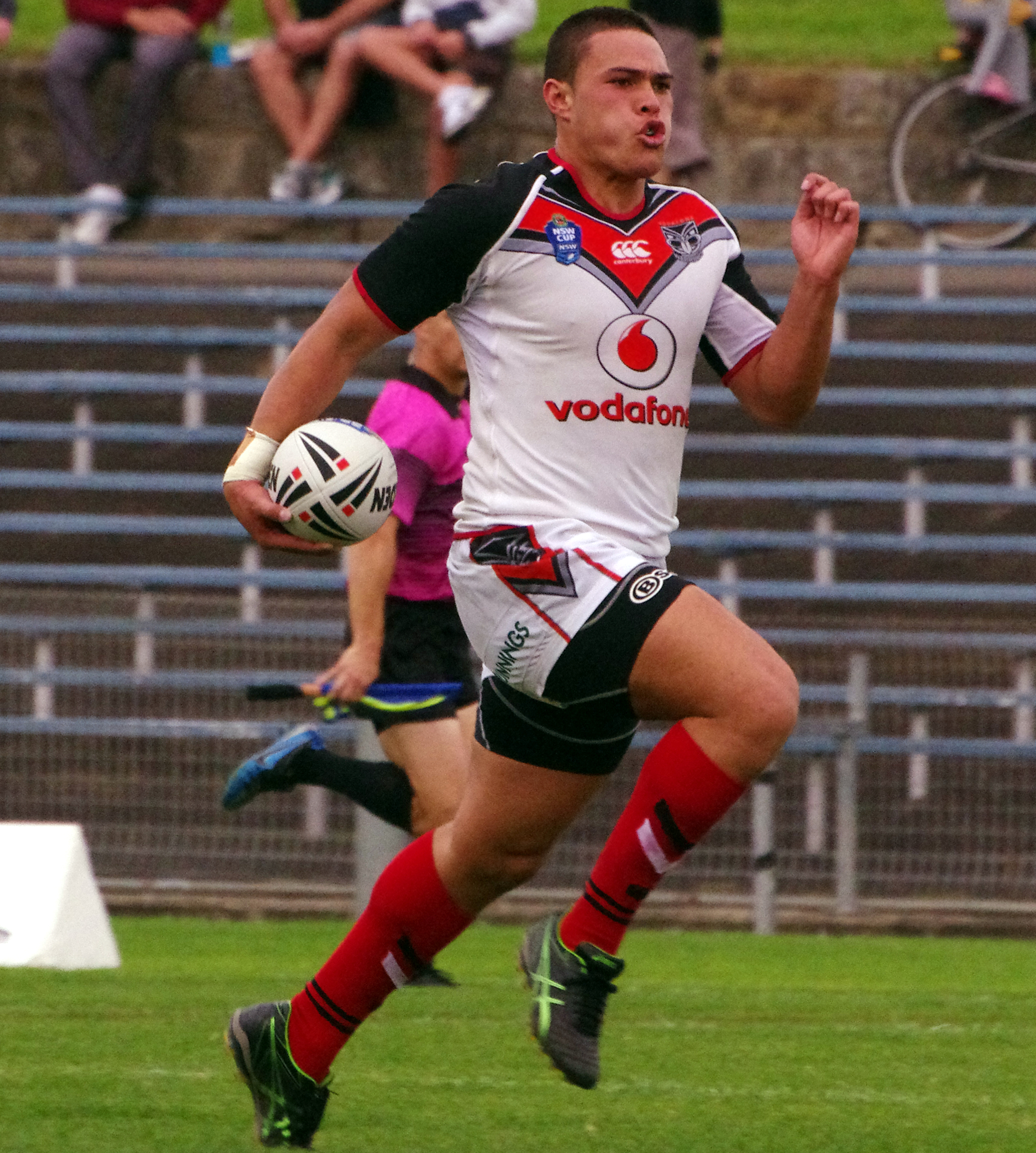
Lolohea playing for the Warriors in 2014

Lolohea made his first grade debut in round 20 against the Manly-Warringah Sea Eagles, playing off the interchange bench in the Warriors 22-12 loss at Mt Smart Stadium after halfback Shaun Johnson was ruled out with injury. Lolohea played in the 2014 Holden Cup Grand Final, won by the Junior Warriors 34-32 over the Junior Brisbane Broncos.

=== 2015 ===
Lolohea was again named in the Warriors' Auckland Nines squad. In Round 3 against the Parramatta Eels, Lolohea scored his first NRL try in the Warriors 29-16 win at Mt Smart Stadium. On 2 May, he played fullback for Tonga against Samoa in the Polynesian Cup, in Tonga's 18-16 loss at Cbus Super Stadium. In round 18, against the Melbourne Storm, Lolohea scored one of the best tries of the 2015 season when he finished a sensational team effort; Nathan Friend was upended and displayed his best acrobatic moves when he chased a Chad Townsend bomb kick and delivered a stunning back flip pass to Sam Tomkins, the ball passed between further Warriors before Lolohea scored in the corner. Lolohea finished the season with 23 matches, 11 tries and 13 goals, while mid-season his contract was extended until the end of 2018.

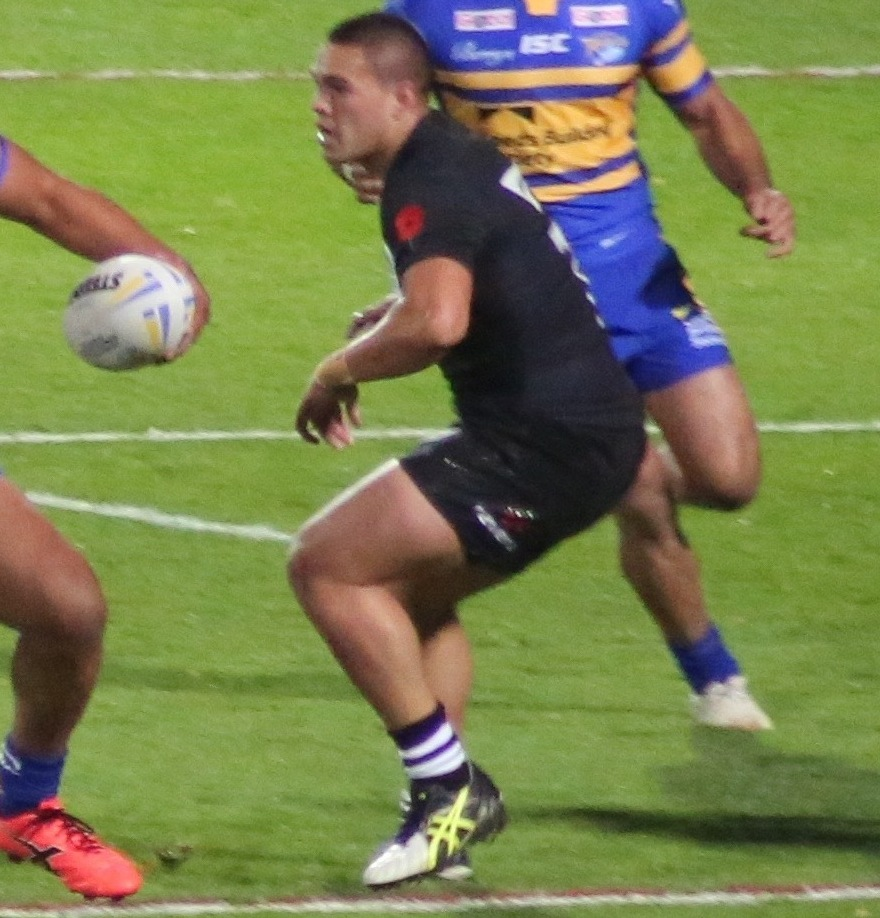
Lolohea playing for the Kiwis in 2015

Lolohea was selected in the final 23-man squad for the New Zealand Kiwis' tour of Great Britain. After injuries to Kieran Foran and Shaun Johnson, the Kiwis were forced to search for a new halves pairing. Lolohea had recently been playing in the halfback role for the Warriors so he was chosen by Kearney to play at halfback with Peta Hiku. Many people were questioning the inexperience of the halves pairing but it was revealed by Stephen Kearney that the two had been training together in secret during the NRL finals to become better adapted to the situation. He played halfback in the first test against England, in the 26-12 loss at KC Stadium, but was not selected for any further games in the series.

=== 2016 ===
In February, Lolohea played for the Warriors in the Auckland Nines. Starting the season playing on the wing, he finished the year mostly playing at fullback. He finished the season with 23 matches, scoring 5 tries and kicking 9 goals.

=== 2017 ===
On 6 May, Lolohea was selected for Tonga to play against Fiji in the 2017 Pacific Cup, he played at five-eighth in the 26-24 win.

After playing in the first 4 rounds, Lolohea was dropped to the Warriors NSW Cup team. He subsequently attracted interest from the Wests Tigers, Canberra Raiders and the North Queensland Cowboys. On 27 May, Lolohea was granted a release from his contract with the Warriors. He played 52 first-grade matches for the club, scoring 17 tries and 18 goals for a total of 104 points. Warriors coach Stephen Kearney said that Lolohea was granted a release so he could play in the halves at another club.

He signed with the Wests Tigers on 29 May. Lolohea said of his move from the Warriors, "I was overweight. I was unhappy. I was struggling. Playing reserve grade on the wing probably didn't help. I was off it a little bit. I've lost six kilograms since coming here and each week I'm feeling better on the field. In the first month at the Tigers, I was struggling and my weight had a lot to do with it." He made his club debut in round 13, and remained at five-eighth for the rest of the season, also taking over goal-kicking duties. He scored 4 tries and 92 points in his 13 matches with his new club.

Returning to the Tongan rugby league team, Mate Ma'a Tonga, for the World Cup, Lolohea played in every game of the tournament at five-eighth. Tonga won five straight games before losing to England in the semi-final. Lolohea scored a try in each of the last 3 games. Considered to have played a major part in the team's success in the series, Lolohea was gifted land in Tonga as a reward. Coach Kristian Woolf said, "Jason and Tui were given land by the nobles in the villages of their families. I guess it was a reward for what they have done … it’s certainly taken the nation on an amazing ride."

=== 2018 ===
With departure of James Tedesco in the off-season, Lolohea was chosen as the new fullback for round 1, and kicked the game-winning conversion to defeat the Roosters 10-8.

July 2018. It was announced that Lolohea would be departing West Tigers at the end of the season and joining the Leeds Rhinos in the Super League.

=== 2019 ===
He played in the 2019 Super League Grand Final defeat by St Helens at Old Trafford.

=== 2020 ===
On 17 October 2020, he played in the 2020 Challenge Cup Final defeat for Salford against Leeds at Wembley Stadium.

=== 2021 ===
On 21 September 2021, it was reported that he had signed for Huddersfield in the Super League.

=== 2022 ===
On 28 May, Lolohea played for Huddersfield in their 16-14 2022 Challenge Cup Final loss against Wigan. Lolohea managed only one successful conversion from five attempts in the match. In the third group stage match at the 2021 Rugby League World Cup, Lolohea scored two tries in Tonga's 92-10 victory over the Cook Islands.

=== 2023 ===
Lolohea played 26 matches with Huddersfield in the 2023 Super League season as the club finished ninth on the table and missed the playoffs.

=== 2024 ===
Lolohea played 25 games for Huddersfield in the 2024 Super League season finishing with 16 try assists as the club once again finished 9th on the table.

=== 2025 ===
Lolohea was limited to just 14 games for Huddersfield in the 2025 Super League season as the club finished 10th on the table.

=== 2026 ===
On 17 November 2026, Lolohea signed a one-year extension with Huddersfield.

== Statistics ==
Year	Team	Games	Tries	Goals	FGs	Pts
2014	New Zealand Warriors	3				
2015	New Zealand Warriors	23	11	13		70
2016	New Zealand Warriors	22	5	5		30
2017	New Zealand Warriors	4	1			4
2017	Wests Tigers	13	4	38		92
2018	Wests Tigers	6	1	9		22
2019	Leeds Rhinos	17	3	19		50
2019	Salford Red Devils	14	4	11		38
2020	Salford Red Devils	19	9	18		72
2021	Salford Red Devils	22	5		1	21
2022	Huddersfield Giants	27	6	18		60
2023	Huddersfield Giants	27	7	2		32
2024	Huddersfield Giants	28	7	7		42
2025	Huddersfield Giants	4	1			4
2026	Huddersfield Giants	29	3	10		32
2027						
	Totals	270	72	151	1	591
