= Tyler Cornish =

Australian rugby league footballer

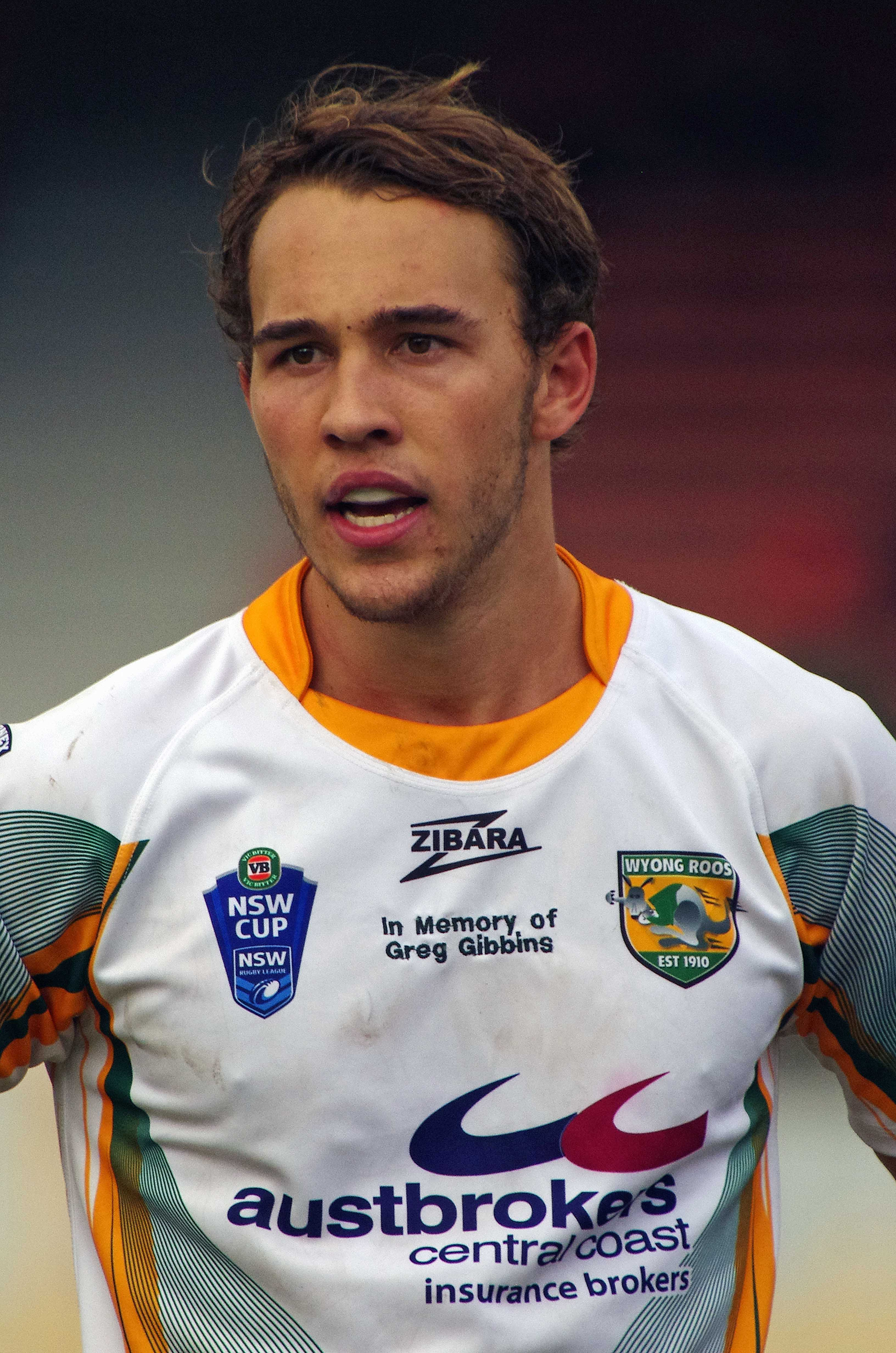
- Cornish playing for the Wyong Roos in 2015

Personal information
- Born: 17 October 1994 (age 32) Goulburn, New South Wales, Australia
- Height: 185 cm (6 ft 1 in)
- Weight: 88 kg (13 st 12 lb)

Playing information
- Position: Halfback, Five-eighth, Fullback
Club
Years	Team	Pld	T	G	FG	P
2017	Gold Coast Titans	1	1	0	0	4
- Source: As of 17 March 2017
- Relatives: Mitch Cornish (brother)

Tyler Cornish (born 17 October 1994) is an Australian professional rugby league footballer. He plays at halfback, five-eighth and fullback. He previously played for the Gold Coast Titans in the National Rugby League.

== Background ==
Born in Goulburn, New South Wales, Cornish played his junior rugby league for the Goulburn Stockmen, before being signed by the Sydney Roosters.

Cornish is the younger brother of Sydney Roosters player Mitch Cornish.

== Playing career ==
=== Early career ===
In 2013 and 2014, Cornish played for the Sydney Roosters' NYC team. In June 2014, he re-signed with the Roosters on a two-year contract until the end of 2016. In 2015, he graduated to their New South Wales Cup team, the Wyong Roos.

=== 2017 ===
In 2017, Cornish joined the Gold Coast Titans. In round 3 of the 2017 NRL season, he made his NRL debut for the Gold Coast against the Parramatta Eels, scoring a try. In April, he moved back to Goulburn after the Gold Coast outfit weren't able to offer him a full-time contract for the rest of the season.

=== 2018 & 2019 ===
Between 2018 and 2019, Cornish played for Mounties in the NSW Cup competition.
