= Corey Norman =

Australian rugby league footballer

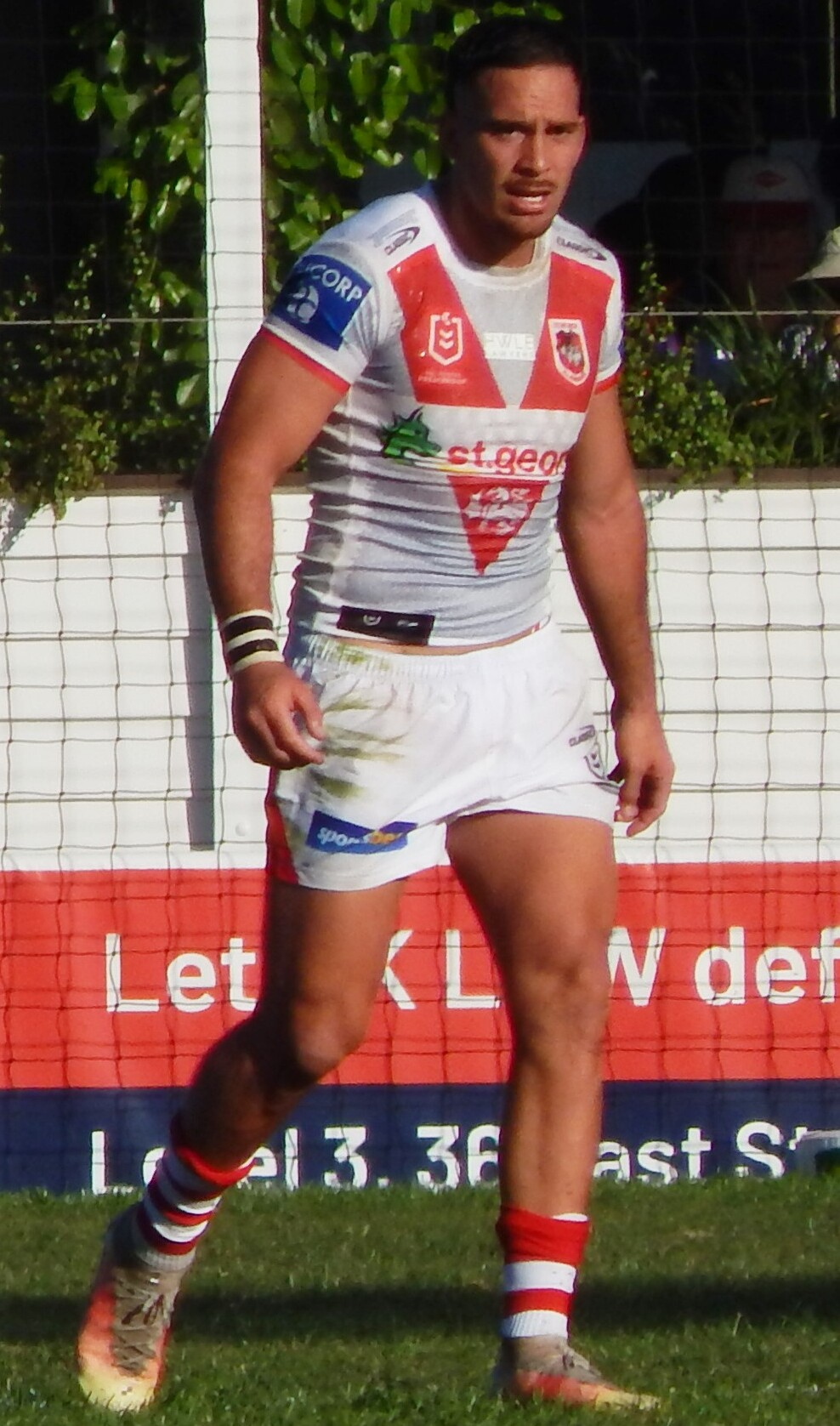

Personal information
- Full name: Corey Norman
- Born: 3 February 1991 (age 35) Brisbane, Queensland, Australia
- Height: 6 ft 1 in (1.85 m)
- Weight: 14 st 5 lb (91 kg)

Playing information
- Position: Stand-off, Fullback, Scrum-half
Club
Years	Team	Pld	T	G	FG	P
2010–13	Brisbane Broncos	62	13	2	0	56
2014–18	Parramatta Eels	107	14	3	1	63
2019–21	St. George Illawarra	59	9	34	4	108
2022	Toulouse Olympique	11	1	0	0	4
2023	FC Lézignan	14	6	0	0	24
2023	London Broncos	15	1	36	0	76
	Total	268	44	75	5	331
Representative
Years	Team	Pld	T	G	FG	P
2017	Prime Minister's XIII	1	0	0	0	0
2019	Queensland	1	0	0	0	0
- Source: As of 22 November 2026

Corey Norman (born 3 February 1991) is an Australian professional rugby league footballer who last played as a stand-off, scrum-half and fullback, most recently for the London Broncos in the Betfred Championship.

Norman previously played for the Brisbane Broncos, the Parramatta Eels and St. George Illawarra Dragons in the NRL and Toulouse Olympique in the Super League. He has played at representative level for the Prime Minister's XIII and Queensland Maroons in State of Origin.

== Background ==
Norman was born in Brisbane, Queensland, Australia of Māori descent. He is eligible to represent both New Zealand and Australia.

He attended Keebra Park State High School on the Gold Coast.

He played his junior football for the Beenleigh Lions before being signed by the Brisbane Broncos.

== Playing career ==
=== Early career ===
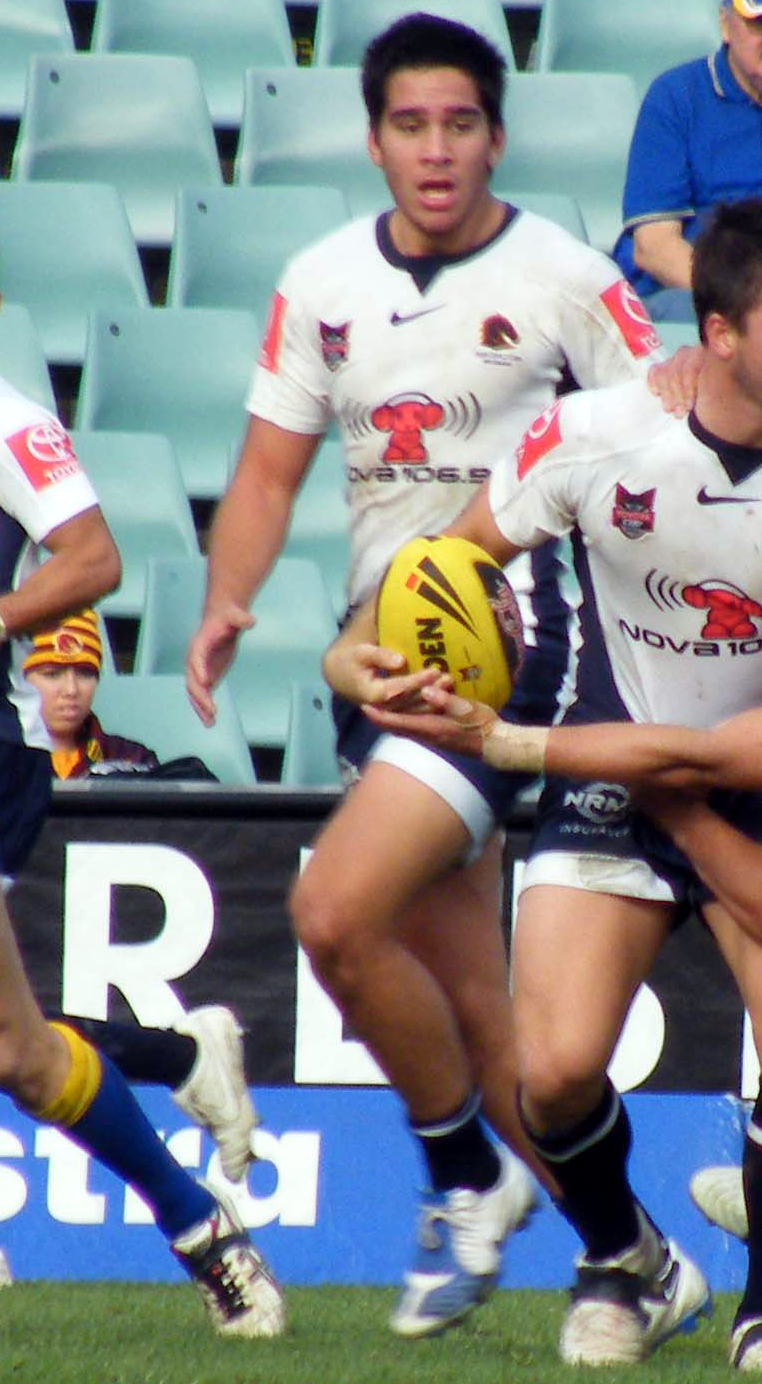
Norman playing for the Brisbane Broncos' NYC team in 2009

Norman played for the Broncos NYC Team in 2009–2011, where in 2009 he was awarded as the Broncos Back of the Year.

=== 2010 ===
In Round 1 of the 2010 NRL season, Norman made his NRL debut for the Brisbane Broncos against the North Queensland Cowboys, beating the likes of Josh Hoffman to the Number 1 jersey after impressing in the trials. Norman made an impression in the opening minutes by saving two early tries before for the 19th minute when he set up Israel Folau in the corner for the first try of the night. Three minutes later, Norman delivered a perfectly weighted pass to captain Darren Lockyer to send him over for the second try of the night which helped the Broncos stay in front for the rest of the game, eventually winning 30–24 at Suncorp Stadium. After the game, Norman was named Man of the Match and became an instant hit with Brisbane fans.

Norman continued to play at fullback till Round 5 before going back to the Broncos NYC team for a few matches after Hoffman was chosen to be the preferred fullback. In Round 9 against the Melbourne Storm, Norman scored his first NRL Career try in the Broncos 36–14 upset win in the Storms’ first match at their new home ground of AAMI Park. On 21 July, Norman extended his contract with the Broncos to the end of the 2012 season. For the remainder of the season, Norman only played in 5 matches, 4 of them at five-eighth as an experiment. He finished his debut year with 1 try from 12 matches. On 23 October, Norman played for the Junior Kangaroos against the Junior Kiwis, playing at five-eighth in both of the 2 junior test matches, the Kangaroos 24–16 win in the first and the 36–20 loss in the second test.

=== 2011 ===
In the 2011 NRL season, Norman only played in 9 matches for the Broncos, playing most of the year in the Toyota Cup.

=== 2012 ===
On 24 February, Norman extended his contract with the Broncos to the end of the 2013 season. It was a breakout year for Norman, where he cemented the void five-eighth position following the retiring departure of Broncos captain Darren Lockyer. Norman played in all of the Broncos 25 matches, scoring 10 tries and kicking 2 goals.

=== 2013 ===
Following the signing of Gold Coast Titans experienced playmaker Scott Prince to the Broncos, Norman was shifted back to fullback. On 25 March, Norman announced that he signed a lucrative 3-year contract with the Parramatta Eels starting from 2014, guaranteed fulltime playing position in his preferred five-eighth spot. Norman continued to play at fullback until Round 18 when he fell from favour of coach Anthony Griffin and spent the rest of the year playing for the Wynnum-Manly Seagulls in the Queensland Cup. He finished his last year with the Broncos with 2 tries from 18 matches

=== 2014 ===
In February, Norman was selected in the Eels inaugural 2014 Auckland Nines squad. In round 1, Norman made his club debut for Parramatta against the New Zealand Warriors, playing at five-eighth and kicking 2 goals in the 36–16 win at Parramatta Stadium. In Round 10 against the St George Illawarra Dragons, he scored his first try for the Eels in the 36–0 win at Parramatta Stadium. Norman cemented the five-eighth position, playing in all of the club's 24 matches and scoring 3 tries in 2014.

=== 2015 ===
On 26 January, Norman played in the Auckland Nines and he was named in the Team of Tournament.

In Round 13 against the North Queensland Cowboys, Norman played his 100th NRL match and also scored a try in the 36–30 loss, after they lead 30–6 till up to the 57th minute. Norman finished the season with 3 tries from 22 matches.

=== 2016 ===
In February, Norman captained the Eels Auckland Nines squad. He took out coveted Player of the Tournament award after he led the team as they triumphed over the New Zealand Warriors 22–4 to win their maiden Auckland 9's title. In Round 1 against his former club the Broncos, Norman left the field injured and was seen using his mobile phone in the changing room, which is banned during NRL matches. Norman was cleared of wrong-doing and said that he was only letting his family know that he was okay.

During a round 9 game, commentator Phil Gould quoted, "Norman would walk into a blues Jersey if he was a New South Welshman." Norman's eligibility is to Queensland despite being stuck behind the likes of Johnathan Thurston and Cooper Cronk. By May, Norman was named third in the leader board for the Dally M Medal. On 21 July, Norman's 2016 campaign ended after he was suspended for 8 weeks and was fined $20,000 for breaches of conduct including being caught with capsules of MDMA in his possession at the Star Casino, filming drug use and sexual activity and consorting with known criminals. He scored one try from his 18 appearances in 2016.

=== 2017 ===
In February, Norman again captained the Eels Auckland Nines team.

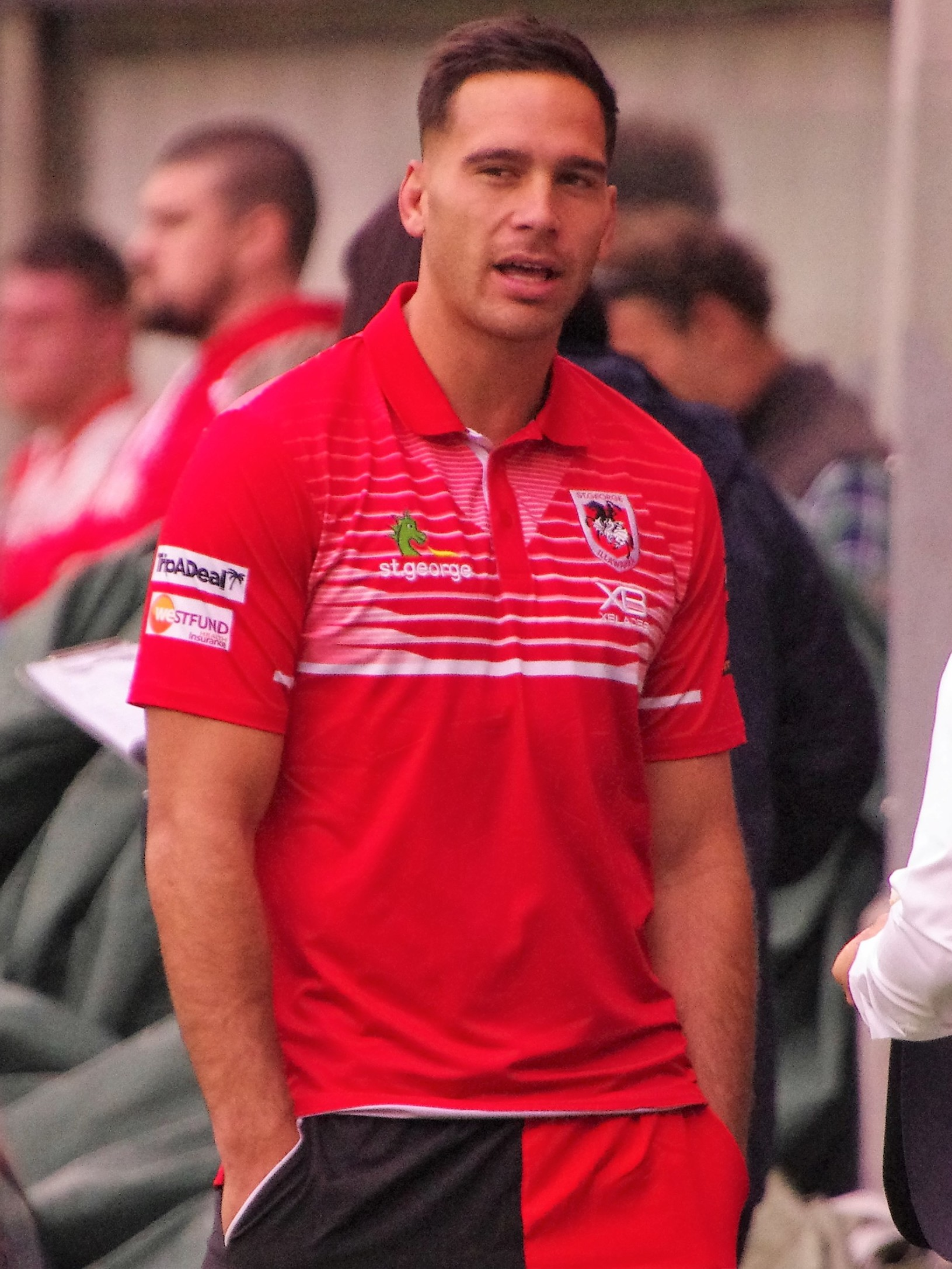
Norman pre-game for the Dragons in 2019

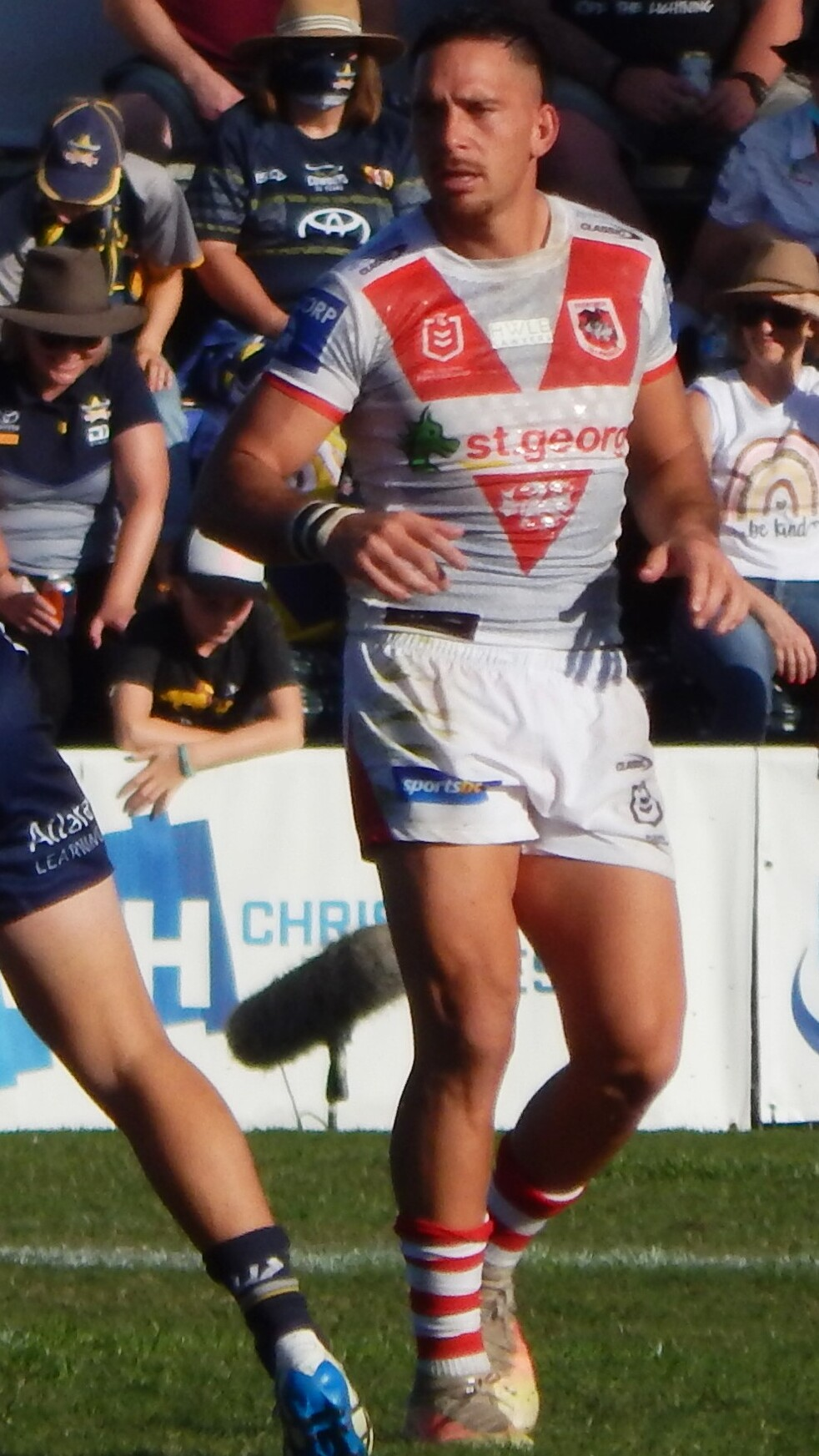
Norman playing for the Dragons in 2021

In Round 1 against the Manly-Warringah Sea Eagles, Norman made his return from suspension, shifting to halfback and scoring a try in the 20–12 win.

On 23 July 2017, Norman kicked a field goal to win the game for Parramatta in a close match against The Wests Tigers 17–16.

On 20 September 2017, Norman received a late call up to the Prime Minister's XIII Representative Team due to a late withdrawal from Canberra Raiders player Josh Papali’i. The team played against PNG XIII. Norman played his hand in two tries coming off the bench.

=== 2018 ===
In the 2018 season, Norman struggled with form over the opening rounds with the club sitting last on the table and only winning 2 of the first 11 games. On 22 May, coach Brad Arthur shifted Norman to fullback in a switch with Clint Gutherson for the Round 12 clash against The Brisbane Broncos.

On 30 May 2017, Norman was handed a $20,000 breach notice for being spotted on social media drinking while he was on the injured list which is against club rules. Parramatta chief executive Bernie Gurr released a statement confirming Norman had been sent a breach notice. “The Parramatta Eels Club has been in discussion with Corey Norman and his management regarding a disciplinary matter, which resulted in a breach notice as part of our club’s disciplinary process,” Gurr said Norman ended the 2018 season with 23 appearances for the club as Parramatta finished in last place on the ladder claiming their 14th wooden spoon.

On 19 December the St George Illawarra Dragons announced the signing of Corey Norman to a 3-year deal.

=== 2019 ===
On 15 January, a video emerged online through social media showing Norman and Australian Rugby Union player Kurtley Beale sitting on a couch as an older man is shown snorting cocaine off a plate. Norman was then heard saying “That’s the young blood right there baby. Get it baby, get it". Norman's new club had informed the NRL integrity unit and released a statement saying “The St George Illawarra Dragons have been made aware of a video circulating on social media of Corey Norman from several years ago, The Dragons informed the NRL Integrity Unit on Monday afternoon. The Integrity Unit confirmed they had previously been made aware of the footage and dealt with it accordingly at the time, The club will make no further comment".

Norman made his debut for St. George Illawarra against North Queensland in round 1 which ended in a 24–12 defeat. In Round 3, he kicked the winning field goal in golden point as St George Illawarra defeated Brisbane 25–24. The following week, Norman kicked a field goal in golden point for the second week running as they defeated Newcastle 13–12.

In round 8, Norman played against his former club Parramatta for the first time since his departure from the club. St. George Illawarra raced out to a 14–0 lead before a second half fight back by Parramatta saw them lose 32–18. Norman suffered a cheek fracture in the match and was taken from the field. He returned in round 13 against Canterbury-Bankstown scoring a try in a 36–12 victory.

On 17 June, Norman was named in the Queensland Maroons squad for Game 2 of State Of Origin as the 19th man. He played in game 3, setting up a try in the first half of the match after he put a kick through for Felise Kaufusi to score. In the second half and with only a minute remaining, the game was set to head into golden point extra-time to decide who would be the series winner until New South Wales shifted the ball to the wing of Blake Ferguson. Norman who was in cover defence missed his tackle on Ferguson who passed the ball back on the inside to James Tedesco who scored the match winning and series winning try.

Norman made a total of 19 appearances for St. George Illawarra in his first year at the club as they endured one of the worst ever seasons finishing in 15th place. Before the start of the season, St George Illawarra were expected to reach the finals and challenge for the premiership but only managed to win a total of 7 games.

=== 2020 ===
In round 10 of the 2020 NRL season, Norman scored the winning try for St. George Illawarra as they defeated Canterbury-Bankstown 28–22 at WIN Stadium.

Norman played a total of 18 games for the club in the 2020 NRL season as they finished 13th on the table and missed out on the finals.

=== 2021 ===
On 25 January, Norman and former NRL player James Segeyaro were involved in a street brawl at Cronulla. It was alleged during the scuffle that a knife was produced. The matter was referred to the NRL Integrity Unit.

On 20 February, Norman was handed a breach notice by the NRL and a fine of $20,000 for his involvement in the street fight.

On 15 June, Norman was informed by the club that his services were not required for next season.

In round 16, Norman kicked the winning field goal for the club as they beat the New Zealand Warriors 19–18 in golden point extra-time.

On 5 July, Norman was fined $50,000 by the NRL and suspended for one game after breaching the game's COVID-19 biosecurity protocols when he attended a party along with 12 other St. George Illawarra players at Paul Vaughan's property. It was also alleged that Norman fled Vaughan's house but left his wallet behind which was discovered by NSW Police.

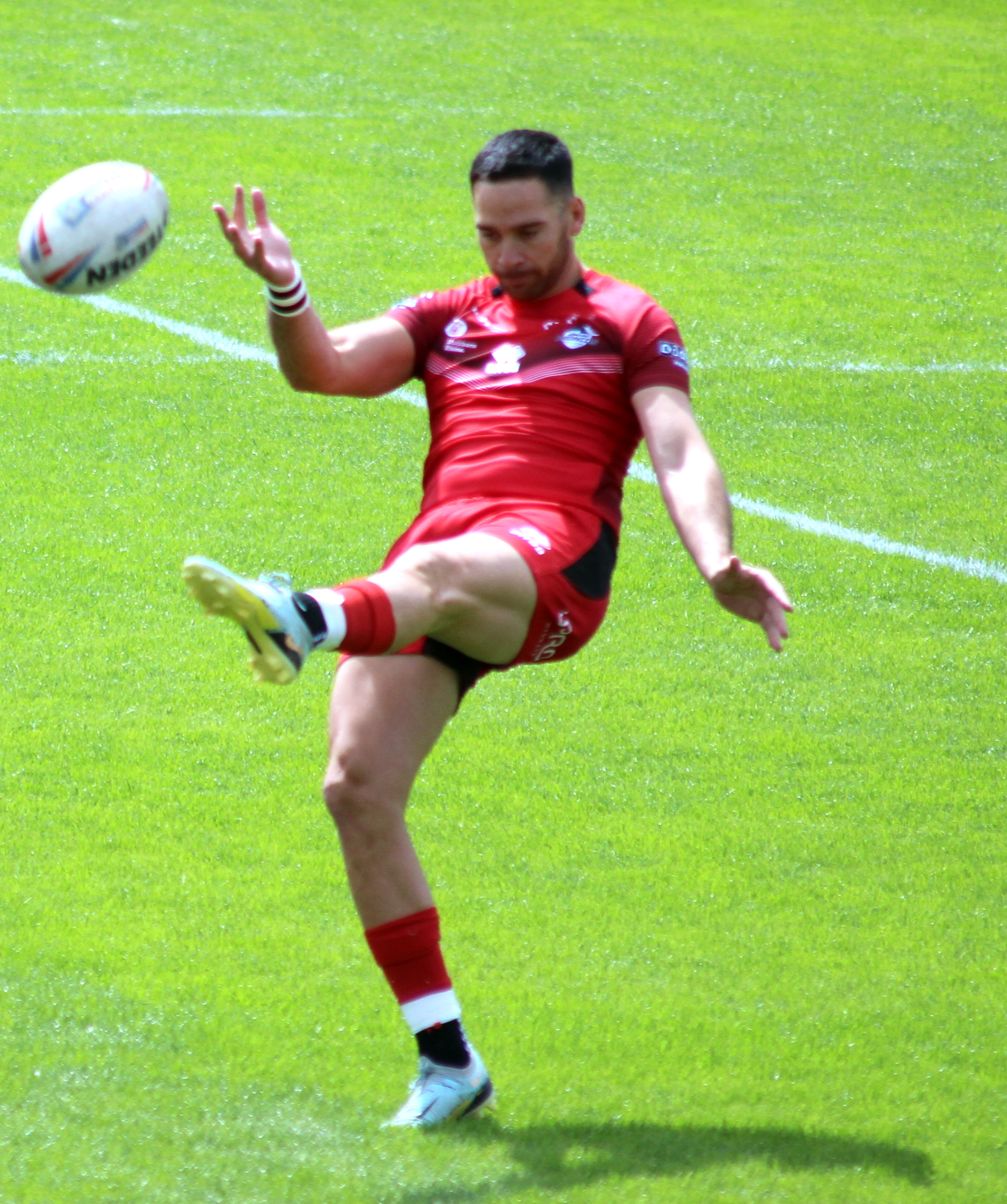
Norman playing for the London Broncos in 2023

Norman played a total of 22 matches for St. George Illawarra in the 2021 NRL season as the club finished 11th on the table and missed out on the finals.

On 16 December, Norman initially announced his retirement from rugby league. Norman claimed that he had received offers from club's in the NRL and Super League for 2022 but said he had no desire to play professional rugby league. Norman spoke on his social media account saying “Yeah I was just like na I’m not even keen to play anymore hey,” Norman said on yktr.sports. “I was just over it so I thought just call it a day".

=== 2022 ===
Going back on his decision to retire, Norman signed for France based Super League side Toulouse Olympique on 20 April 2022.

In round 18 of the 2022 Super League season, Norman was awarded the man of the match in Toulouse Olympique's 38–26 victory over Wakefield Trinity at Magic Weekend.

During Toulouse Olympique's round 23 loss to Warrington, Norman was placed on report for allegedly inserting his fingers into the bottom of Warrington's Oliver Holmes. Norman was charged by the RFL with a Grade F offence.

On 16 August, Norman was found guilty of the offence and suspended for eight matches which ended his season.

Following Toulouse Olympique's relegation from the Super League, Norman signed a one-year contract to join French Elite 1 side FC Lézignan XIII.

=== 2023 ===
On 30 May, it was announced that Norman had signed a contract to join Championship side the London Broncos. On 15 October, Norman played in the London Broncos upset Million Pound Game victory over Toulouse Olympique. On 7 December, it was announced that Norman had departed the London club.
