= Jeff Robson =

Australian rugby league footballer

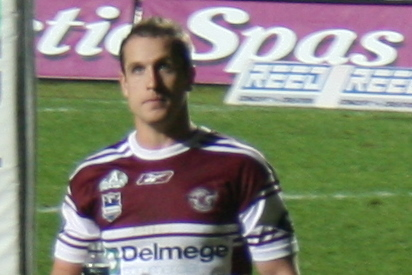

Personal information
- Full name: Jeffrey Robson
- Born: 5 August 1982 (age 44) Leeton, New South Wales, Australia
- Height: 176 cm (5 ft 9 in)
- Weight: 88 kg (13 st 12 lb)

Playing information
- Position: Halfback, Hooker, Five-eighth
Club
Years	Team	Pld	T	G	FG	P
2004–08	Manly Sea Eagles	6	0	0	0	0
2009–11	Parramatta Eels	61	9	0	0	36
2012–15	Cronulla Sharks	92	18	0	1	73
2016	New Zealand Warriors	7	1	0	0	4
2016–17	Parramatta Eels	10	2	0	0	8
	Total	176	30	0	1	121

Jeff Robson (born 5 August 1982) is an Australian former professional rugby league footballer who last played for the Parramatta Eels. He played primarily as a halfback.

== Playing career ==
Robson made his NRL debut for the Manly-Warringah Sea Eagles in 2004 against the Cronulla-Sutherland Sharks. After only making 6 appearances in 4 years with Manly, Robson signed for Parramatta Eels at the start of 2009.

Robson was playing reserve grade for the Wentworthville Magpies in 2009 when he was called up by coach Daniel Anderson to replace Brett Finch in the halves midway through the season. At the time Parramatta were 13th on the ladder, but staged an incredible run of form which took them all the way to the 2009 NRL Grand Final against Melbourne. Parramatta lost the match 23–16, when asked about what he remembers from that season Robson said "That year the team played with a lot of confidence, we were turning up to training and playing well and going really confident into the games, we'd somehow find a way to win".

In the 2010 and 2011 seasons, Parramatta failed to build upon their momentum of making the 2009 NRL Grand Final and missed out on the finals in both years. In Robson's final year at the club, they needed to defeat the Gold Coast to avoid the wooden spoon.

In 2012, Robson joined the Cronulla-Sutherland Sharks on a two-year deal. On 7 June 2013, Robson re-signed with Cronulla-Sutherland for another two seasons. In 2014, whilst captain Paul Gallen and vice captain Wade Graham were suspended, Robson was the Cronulla-Sutherland captain as the club finished last on the table. Robson played in 92 games over 4 years for Cronulla-Sutherland.

Robson joined the New Zealand Warriors for the 2016 season. He was released in June 2016 on compassionate grounds after playing in seven games for the club. In July 2016, Robson rejoined the Parramatta Eels, as a replacement for Kieran Foran. At the end of the 2017 NRL season, Robson announced his retirement from rugby league.
