= Jonathan Wright (rugby league) =

Australian rugby league footballer

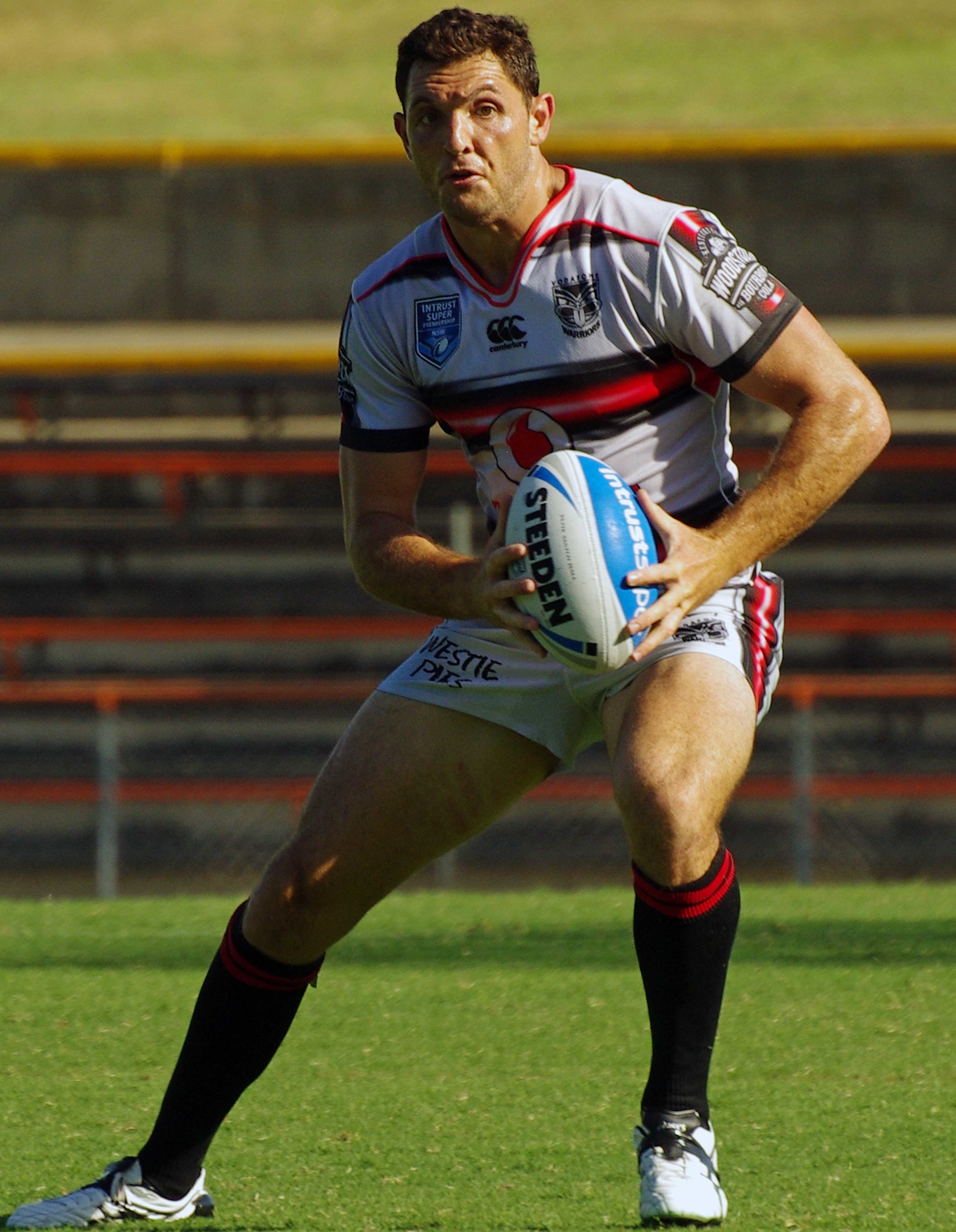

Personal information
- Born: 8 March 1987 (age 39) Gilgandra, New South Wales, Australia
- Height: 187 cm (6 ft 2 in)
- Weight: 98 kg (15 st 6 lb)

Playing information
- Position: Wing, Centre
Club
Years	Team	Pld	T	G	FG	P
2009–10	Parramatta Eels	12	3	0	0	12
2011–12	Canterbury Bulldogs	38	17	0	0	68
2013–14	Cronulla Sharks	41	8	0	0	32
2015–16	New Zealand Warriors	29	8	0	0	32
2018	Manly Sea Eagles	1	1	0	0	4
	Total	121	37	0	0	148
- Source: As of 4 March 2018

Jonathan Wright (born 8 March 1987) is an Australian former professional rugby league footballer who most recently played for the Manly Warringah Sea Eagles in the National Rugby League. He primarily played wing and centre.

== Background ==
Wright was born in Gilgandra, New South Wales, Australia.

He played his junior football for the Northern Lakes Warriors before being signed by the Newcastle Knights.

== Playing career ==
Wright played for the Knights' Jersey Flegg team, playing in their 2006 Grand Final before being signed by the Parramatta Eels. He played for the Eels' NSW Cup reserve-grade team. In round 13 of the 2009 NRL season he made his NRL debut for Parramatta against his former team, the Newcastle Knights. He played 4 more games in Parramatta's run to the 2009 NRL Grand Final before signing a two-year contract with the Canterbury-Bankstown Bulldogs.

In the 2012 NRL season, Wright played 27 games and scored 14 tries as Canterbury won the Minor Premiership. Wright played for Canterbury-Bankstown in their 2012 NRL Grand Final defeat against Melbourne.

In August 2012, Wright signed a two-year contract with the Cronulla-Sutherland Sharks starting in 2013. In his first season at Cronulla, the club reached the finals and Wright featured in both matches. He scored a try in Cronulla's elimination final loss against rivals Manly-Warringah at the Sydney Football Stadium.

The following season, Cronulla endured a horror year on and off the field as the club finished last on the table and claimed the Wooden Spoon. In December 2014 Wright signed a one-year contract with the New Zealand Warriors starting in 2015, and in July 2015 his contract was extended by a year, until the end of 2016.

He was released by the Warriors at the end of the 2016 NRL season. Wright signed with the Manly-Warringah Sea Eagles for the 2017 NRL season. In October 2016, Wright played for the Redfern All Blacks in the NSW Koori Knockout tournament.

In August 2018, it was announced that Wright would be retiring at the end of the 2018 NRL season.
