= Chad Townsend =

Australian rugby league footballer

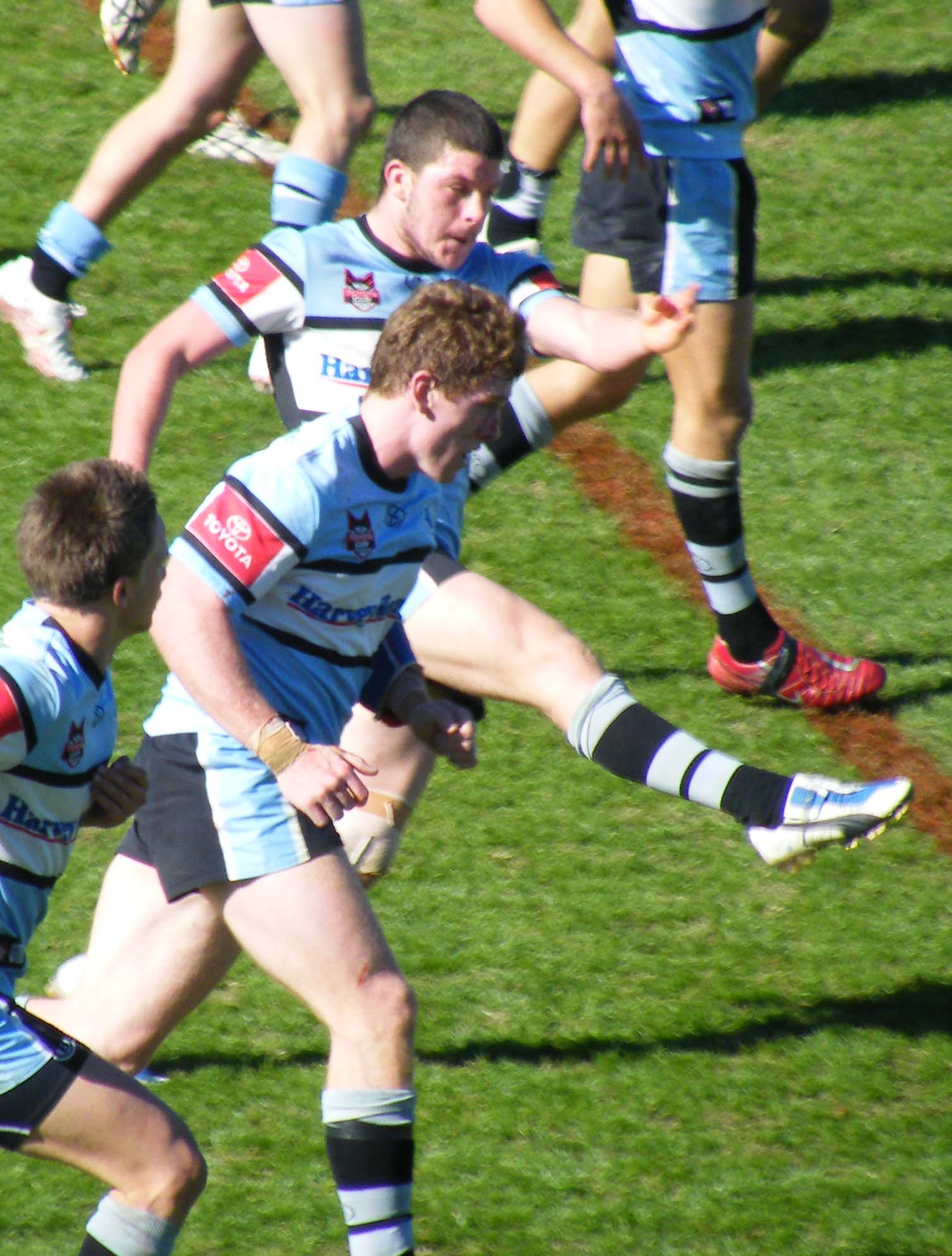

Personal information
- Full name: Chad Stephen Townsend
- Born: 10 January 1991 (age 35) Caringbah, New South Wales, Australia
- Height: 181 cm (5 ft 11 in)
- Weight: 87 kg (13 st 10 lb)

Playing information
- Position: Halfback, Five-eighth
Club
Years	Team	Pld	T	G	FG	P
2011–13	Cronulla Sharks	19	3	28	0	68
2014–15	New Zealand Warriors	41	5	14	1	49
2016–21	Cronulla Sharks	127	25	112	10	334
2021	New Zealand Warriors	5	0	3	0	6
2022–24	North Qld Cowboys	70	7	10	9	57
2025	Sydney Roosters	6	0	0	0	0
	Total	268	40	167	20	514
Representative
Years	Team	Pld	T	G	FG	P
2016–17	NSW City	2	0	0	0	0
2018	Prime Minister's XIII	1	1	0	0	4
- Source: As of 18 July 2025
- Relatives: Scott Sorensen (brother-in-law)

Chad Townsend (born 10 January 1991) is an Australian former professional rugby league footballer who last played as a halfback for the Sydney Roosters in the National Rugby League (NRL).

He previously played for the Cronulla-Sutherland Sharks from 2011-2013 as halfback and five-eighth before playing as a five-eighth for the New Zealand Warriors from 2014-2015. Townsend returned to the Sharks in 2016 as halfback, winning the 2016 NRL Grand Final, and was the only local junior in the clubs maiden premiership before joining the Warriors in mid-2021 at halfback before moving to the North Queensland Cowboys in 2022, co-captaining the side from 2022-23 as-well as filling in twice in 2024. He represented NSW City at halfback twice and the Prime Minister's XIII off the bench once.

== Background ==
Townsend was born at Sutherland Hospital in the Southern Sydney suburb of Caringbah.

== Playing career ==
=== Early career ===
Townsend played his rugby league for the Yarrawarrah Tigers in the Cronulla-Sutherland local rugby league competition. During his junior football he was a part of 7 premiership teams.

=== Cronulla-Sutherland Sharks ===
After being signed by Cronulla, Townsend made his debut in round 13 of the 2011 NRL season. In his first match, played against the Brisbane Broncos, he managed to convert two tries scored by fellow players Jon Mannah and Colin Best in the 40th and 80th minutes respectively. As a result of the injury of Albert Kelly early in the season and the subsequent poor performance of Cronulla's other half options, Townsend was given the opportunity to play in the NRL, after his good form in the Toyota Cup competition. He scored his first try in round 17 against South Sydney. The Sharks won that game 26 – 4. Townsend represented the Junior Kangaroos in 2011 and the NSW under 18s and NSW CHS.

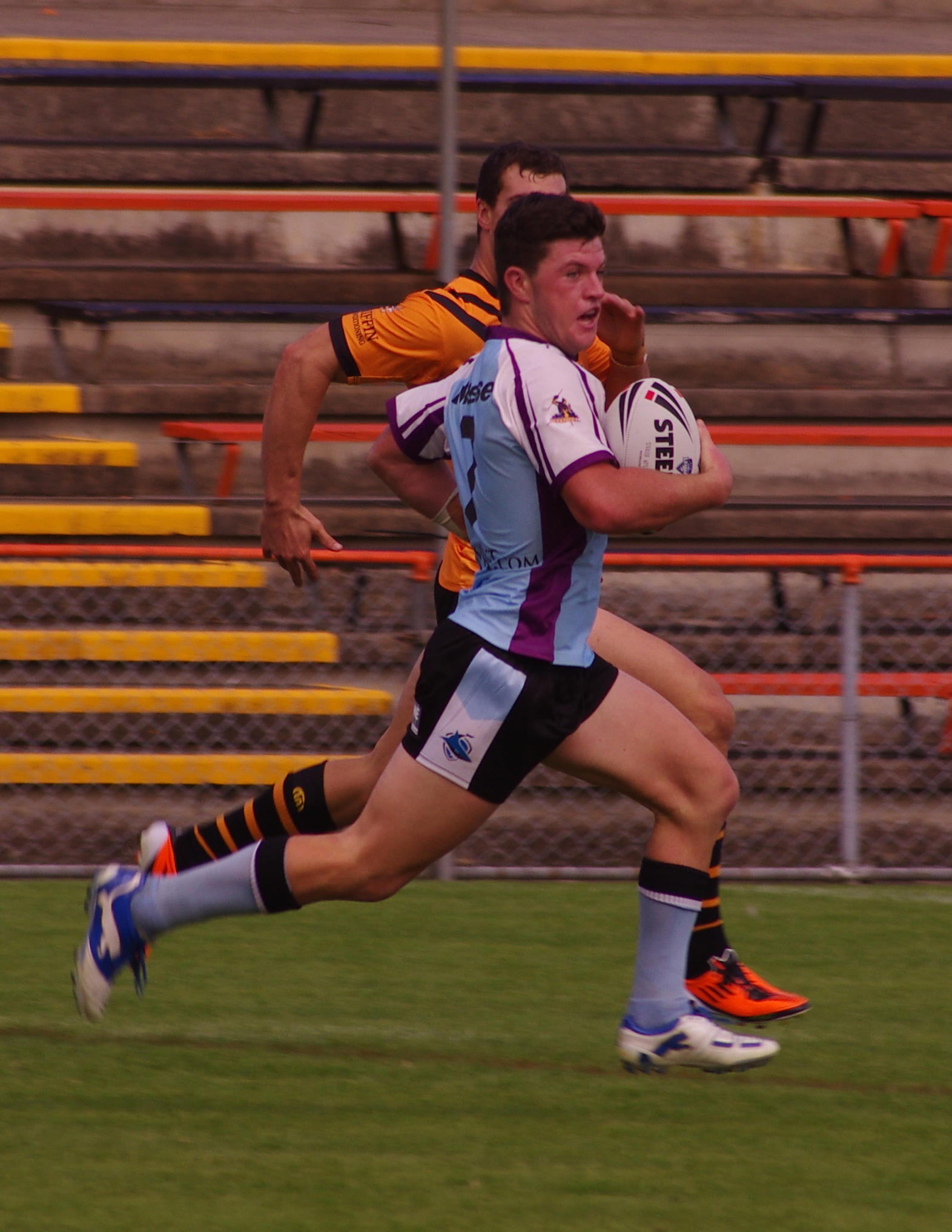
Townsend playing for the Sharks-Storm team in 2012

On 22 September 2013, Townsend was named at halfback in the 2013 New South Wales Cup Team of the Year.

On 6 October 2013, Townsend was part of the Cronulla side which defeated Windsor Wolves 38–6 in the NSW Cup Grand Final.

=== New Zealand Warriors ===
Townsend joined the New Zealand Warriors for the 2014 NRL season, where he partnered Shaun Johnson in the halves.

The New Zealand Warriors missed the finals in both seasons that Townsend was at the club.

=== Return to Cronulla-Sutherland ===
It was announced in July 2015 that he would return to Cronulla in 2016 on a two-year contract.

On 2 October 2016, Townsend was part of the Cronulla side which won their first ever premiership defeating Melbourne 14–12 in the grand final.

In 2017 Townsend was part of the Cronulla side which qualified for the finals but were eliminated in week one losing to North Queensland 15–14 in a shock defeat. In 2018, Townsend kicked the winning field goal for Cronulla in their week two elimination final against Penrith. The following week, Cronulla fell short of a grand final appearance losing to Melbourne 22–6 in the preliminary final. In 2019, Townsend was named Cronulla's player of the year. In 2020, Townsend was named in the Cronulla-Sutherland Sharks team of the decade. In round 17 of the 2020 NRL season, Townsend became the third player of the year to be sent off after he hit Newcastle player Kalyn Ponga with a shoulder charge.

Townsend played 12 games for Cronulla in the 2020 NRL season as the club finished 8th and qualified for the finals He played in Cronulla's elimination final loss against Canberra.

On 21 April 2021, Townsend signed a three-year deal with the North Queensland Cowboys starting in the 2022 season.

=== Return to the New Zealand Warriors ===
On 23 June 2021, it was announced that Townsend would leave the Cronulla-Sutherland Sharks to return to the New Zealand Warriors for the remainder of the 2021 NRL season, with the short-term deal not affecting his 2022 deal with the North Queensland Cowboys.

In round 16, Townsend played his first game for the New Zealand Warriors since his return to the club, playing at halfback against the St. George Illawarra Dragons. New Zealand would go on to lose the game 19–18, and to make matters worse Townsend picked up a shoulder injury, putting him out of play for an estimated 6–8 weeks.

=== North Queensland Cowboys ===
In round 1 of the 2022 NRL season Townsend made his club debut for North Queensland in their 6–4 defeat against Canterbury at the Queensland Country Bank Stadium. Townsend played 26 matches for North Queensland in the 2022 NRL season as the club finished third on the table and qualified for the finals. Townsend played in both finals matches including their preliminary final loss to Parramatta. In round 1 of the 2023 NRL season, Townsend kicked a field goal with five minutes remaining to seal a 19–18 victory over Canberra. Townsend played 24 games for North Queensland in the 2023 NRL season as the club finished 11th on the table. In round 2 of the 2024 NRL season, Townsend kicked the winning field goal for North Queensland in their 21-20 golden point extra-time victory over Newcastle.

=== Sydney Roosters ===
On 2 July 2024, it was confirmed that Townsend would leave the North Queensland Cowboys at the end of the 2024 NRL season, to join the Sydney Roosters for the 2025 NRL season. In round 1 of the 2025 NRL season, Townsend made his club debut for the Sydney Roosters against Brisbane which ended in a 50-14 defeat. On 8 April 2025, Townsend was demoted to the NSW Cup after a number of sub par performances to start the year. After spending three months in exile with the reserve grade team, Townsend was called into the Sydney Roosters side for their round 20 match against Cronulla. On 29 July, Townsend announced his official retirement from the NRL.

== Post playing ==
On 12 November 2025, the Sharks announced that Townsend would coach Cronulla's SG Ball squad in 2026.

== Statistics ==
Season	Team	Games	Tries	Goals	FG	Pts
2011	Cronulla-Sutherland	11	2	19		46
2012	Cronulla-Sutherland	3	1	8		20
2013	Cronulla-Sutherland	5		1		2
2014	New Zealand Warriors	19	3	14		40
2015	New Zealand Warriors	22	2		1	9
2016	Cronulla-Sutherland	27	7	6	1	41
2017	Cronulla-Sutherland	25	6	2	1	29
2018	Cronulla-Sutherland	27	5	62	4	148
2019	Cronulla-Sutherland	12	6	7	3	41
2020	Cronulla-Sutherland	11		4		12
2021	Cronulla-Sutherland	11		31	1	63
2021	New Zealand Warriors	5		3		6
2022	North Queensland	26	2	4	1	17
2023	North Queensland	24	2	6	5	25
2024	North Queensland	20	3		3	15
2025	Sydney Roosters	6				
	Totals	268	40	167	20	514

*denotes season competing
