= List of North Queensland Cowboys seasons =

Since joining the then ARL competition as an expansion franchise in 1995, the North Queensland Cowboys have competed in the National Rugby League competition for 30 consecutive seasons.

== Seasons ==
=== Men's team ===
Table key
#	Competition conducted by Australian Rugby League
~	Competition conducted by Super League
‡	Club finished regular season in first position (J. J. Giltinan Shield)
†	Club finished regular season in last position (wooden spoon)
DNQ	Club did not qualify for finals

Table of yearly win–loss records, with finals results, and key personnel
Season	Club	WCC	Regular season				Finals results			Coach	Captain(s) (Note: Official club captains.)	Ref
Season	Club	WCC	Pos.	W	L	D	Final position	W	L	Coach	Captain(s)	Ref
1995#	1995	—N/a	20th†	2	20	0	DNQ			Grant Bell	Laurie Spina	
1996#	1996	—N/a	17th	6	15	0	DNQ			Graham Lowe	Adrian Vowles	
1997~	1997	Pool	10th†	5	11	2	DNQ			Tim Sheens	Ian Roberts	
1998	1998	—N/a	16th	9	15	0	DNQ			Tim Sheens	John Lomax	
1999	1999	—N/a	16th	4	19	1	DNQ			Tim Sheens	Noel Goldthorpe	
2000	2000	—N/a	14th	7	19	0	DNQ			Tim Sheens	Tim Brasher	
2001	2001	—N/a	13th	6	18	2	DNQ			Tim Sheens → Murray Hurst	Paul Bowman	
2002	2002	—N/a	11th	8	16	0	DNQ			Murray Hurst → Graham Murray	Paul Bowman	
2003	2003	—N/a	11th	10	14	0	DNQ			Graham Murray	Paul Bowman	
2004	2004	—N/a	7th	12	11	1	Lost preliminary final	2	1	Graham Murray	Travis Norton	
2005	2005	—N/a	5th	14	10	0	Runners-up	2	2	Graham Murray	Travis Norton	
2006	2006	—N/a	9th	11	13	1	DNQ			Graham Murray	Travis Norton	
2007	2007	—N/a	3rd	15	9	0	Lost preliminary final	2	1	Graham Murray	Travis Norton	
2008	2008	—N/a	15th	5	19	0	DNQ			Graham Murray → Ian Millward	Johnathan Thurston	
2009	2009	—N/a	12th	11	13	0	DNQ			Neil Henry	Johnathan Thurston	
2010	2010	—N/a	15th	5	19	0	DNQ			Neil Henry	Johnathan Thurston & Matthew Scott	
2011	2011	—N/a	7th	14	10	0	Lost qualifying final	0	1	Neil Henry	Johnathan Thurston & Matthew Scott	
2012	2012	—N/a	5th	15	9	0	Lost semi final	1	1	Neil Henry	Johnathan Thurston & Matthew Scott	
2013	2013	—N/a	8th	12	12	0	Lost qualifying final	0	1	Neil Henry	Johnathan Thurston & Matthew Scott	
2014	2014	—N/a	5th	14	10	0	Lost semi final	1	1	Paul Green	Johnathan Thurston & Matthew Scott	
2015	2015	—N/a	3rd	17	7	0	Premiers	3	1	Paul Green	Johnathan Thurston & Matthew Scott	
2016	2016	Won	4th	15	9	0	Lost preliminary final	1	2	Paul Green	Johnathan Thurston & Matthew Scott	
2017	2017	—N/a	8th	13	11	0	Runners-up	3	1	Paul Green	Johnathan Thurston & Matthew Scott	
2018	2018	—N/a	13th	8	16	0	DNQ			Paul Green	Michael Morgan	
2019	2019	—N/a	14th	9	15	0	DNQ			Paul Green	Michael Morgan	
2020	2020	—N/a	14th	5	15	0	DNQ			Paul Green → Josh Hannay	Michael Morgan	
2021	2021	—N/a	15th	7	17	0	DNQ			Todd Payten	Jason Taumalolo	
2022	2022	—N/a	3rd	17	7	0	Lost preliminary final	1	1	Todd Payten	Jason Taumalolo & Chad Townsend	
2023	2023	—N/a	11th	12	12	0	DNQ			Todd Payten	Jason Taumalolo & Chad Townsend	
2024	2024	—N/a	5th	15	9	0	Lost semi final	1	1	Todd Payten	Reuben Cotter & Tom Dearden	
2025	2025	—N/a	12th	9	14	1	DNQ			Todd Payten	Reuben Cotter & Tom Dearden	
2026	2026	—N/a	8th	13	11	0	Lost elimination final	0	1	Todd Payten	Reuben Cotter & Tom Dearden	

=== NRL Under-20s ===
Table key
‡	Club finished regular season in first position (minor premiers)
†	Club finished regular season in last position (wooden spoon)
DNQ	Club did not qualify for finals

Table of yearly win–loss records, with finals results, and key personnel
Season	Club	Regular season				Finals results			Coach	Ref
Season	Club	Pos.	W	L	D	Final position	W	L	Coach	Ref
2008	2008	16th†	4	17	3	DNQ			Grant Bell	
2009	2009	9th	12	12	0	DNQ			Kristian Woolf	
2010	2010	4th	14	7	3	Lost semi final	1	1	Kristian Woolf	
2011	2011	2nd	17	7	0	Runners-up	1	1	Kristian Woolf	
2012	2012	13th	7	15	2	DNQ			Todd Wilson	
2013	2013	10th	9	13	2	DNQ			Todd Wilson	
2014	2014	12th	8	16	0	DNQ			Todd Wilson	
2015	2015	2th	19	4	1	Lost preliminary final	1	1	Todd Payten	
2016	2016	2nd	16	7	1	Lost preliminary final	1	2	Aaron Payne	
2017	2017	5th	14	10	0	Lost elimination final	0	1	Aaron Payne	

=== Women's team ===
Table key
‡	Club finished regular season in first position (minor premiers)
†	Club finished regular season in last position (wooden spoon)
DNQ	Club did not qualify for finals

Table of yearly win–loss records, with finals results, and key personnel
Season	Club	Regular season				Finals results			Coach	Captain(s)	Ref
Season	Club	Pos.	W	L	D	Final position	W	L	Coach	Captain(s)	Ref
2023	2023	9th	2	7	0	DNQ			Ben Jeffries	Kirra Dibb & Tallisha Harden	
2024	2024	6th	4	5	0	DNQ			Ricky Henry	Kirra Dibb & Tallisha Harden	
2025	2025	4th	7	4	0	Lost elimination final	0	1	Ricky Henry	Kirra Dibb & Emma Manzelmann	
2026	2026	10th	3	8	0	DNQ			Ricky Henry	Emma Manzelmann	
