= Fisiiahi =

Fisiiahi is a surname. Notable people with the surname include:

- David Fisiiahi, New Zealand rugby league player
- Glen Fisiiahi (born 1990), New Zealand rugby league and rugby union player
- Paul Fisiiahi, New Zealand rugby league player
