= 2013 Polynesian Cup =

2013 Pacific Rugby League test
Samoa	Tonga
4	36
	1	2	Total
SAM	4	0	4
TON	10	26	36
- Date: 20 April 2013
- Stadium: Centrebet Stadium
- Location: Penrith, New South Wales, Australia
- Man of the Match: (Tonga) Samisoni Langi
- Referee: (Australia) Matt Cecchin
- Attendance: 10,143

Broadcast partners
- Broadcasters: Fox Sports Australia
- Commentators: Matt Russell Greg Alexander Mark Gasnier

The 2013 Polynesian Cup was played between Samoa and Tonga. Tonga won the test match 36–4. Tonga's Samisoni Langi won the player of the match award, scoring 16 points from two attempts and four conversions.

Controversy occurred late in the match, as the game was ended before Langi had the chance to convert the final try because fans invaded the pitch.

Both teams selected new players, with the most experienced players appearing between 3-8 times. The most experienced players in the test match were Tonga's Richard Fa'aoso and Etu Uaisele who both made 8 previous appearances. Samoa's most experienced player was Ben Roberts who made 3 previous appearances. All players were contracted to NRL clubs (though some were still playing in the NYC, except for Tongan winger Etu Uaisele who played for the Wyong Roos in the New South Wales Cup.

20 April 2013
19:30 (AEST)

Samoa	4 – 36	Tonga
Try: Vidot 27' m Goal: Roberts (0/1)	Video	Try: Langi (2) 4' c, 73' c Likiliki (2) 11' m, 42' m Fonua (2) 63' c, 79' (not attempted); Uaisele 59' c Goal: Langi (4/6) 4', 59', 63', 73'

FB	1	Matthew Wright
WG	2	Kalifa Faifai Loa
CE	3	Antonio Winterstein
CE	4	Junior Sa'u
WG	5	Daniel Vidot
FE	6	Carlos Tuimavave
HB	7	Ben Roberts
PR	8	Jeff Lima
HK	9	Masada Iosefa
PR	10	Roy Asotasi (c)
SR	11	Eddy Pettybourne
SR	12	Sam Tagataese
LK	13	Lama Tasi
Substitutions:
BE	14	Leeson Ah Mau
BE	15	Martin Taupau
BE	16	Mark Taufua
BE	17	Alex Elisala
Coach:
(Australia) Steve Price

FB	1	Glen Fisiiahi
WG	2	Mahe Fonua
CE	3	Michael Oldfield
CE	4	Siuatonga Likiliki
WG	5	Etu Uaisele
FE	6	Samisoni Langi
HB	7	Daniel Foster
PR	8	Brent Kite (c)
HK	14	Siliva Havili
PR	18	Fuifui Moimoi
SR	11	Sika Manu
SR	12	Jason Taumalolo
LK	13	Anthony Tupou
Substitutions:
BE	9	Nafe Seluini
BE	10	Sam Moa
BE	16	Richard Faʻaoso
BE	17	Ben Murdoch-Masila
Coach:
Charlie Tonga

== See also ==
- 2013 Anzac Test
