= Raymond Faitala-Mariner =

NZ & Samoa international rugby league footballer

Ray Faitala-Mariner
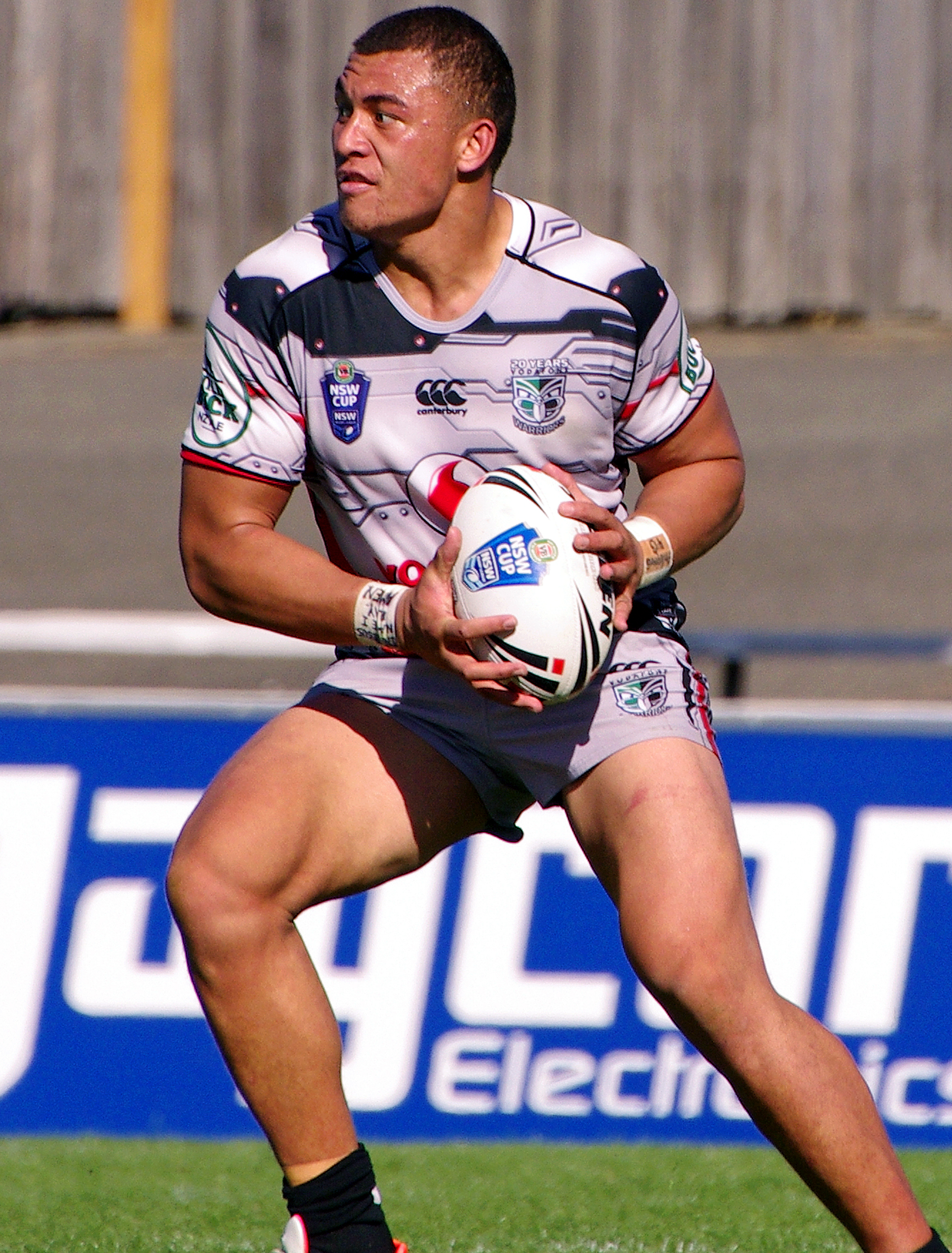

Personal information
- Born: 26 July 1993 (age 33) Auckland, New Zealand
- Height: 190 cm (6 ft 3 in)
- Weight: 110 kg (17 st 5 lb)

Playing information
- Position: Second-row, Lock
Club
Years	Team	Pld	T	G	FG	P
2015–16	New Zealand Warriors	12	1	0	0	4
2016–23	Canterbury Bulldogs	102	11	0	0	44
2024–25	St. George Illawarra	24	2	0	0	8
	Total	138	14	0	0	56
Representative
Years	Team	Pld	T	G	FG	P
2016–19	Samoa	3	0	0	0	0
2018	New Zealand	1	0	0	0	0
- Source: As of 21 August 2025
- Relatives: Lama Tasi (cousin); Tautalatasi Tasi (cousin)

Raymond Faitala-Mariner (born 26 July 1993) is a professional rugby league footballer who last played as a second-row forward for the St. George Illawarra Dragons in the National Rugby League (NRL). He has played for both Samoa and New Zealand at international level.

He previously played for the New Zealand Warriors and Canterbury-Bankstown Bulldogs in the NRL.

== Early years ==
Faitala-Mariner was born in Auckland, New Zealand. He is of Samoan descent.

Faitala-Mariner attended Edgewater College and played his junior rugby league for Otahuhu Leopards before being signed by the New Zealand Warriors.

== Playing career ==
Faitala-Mariner played in the Warriors' Holden Cup team in 2012 and 2013, as well as in the New South Wales Cup with the Auckland Vulcans in late 2013. Faitala-Mariner played at second-row in the Junior Warriors 2013 Holden Cup Grand Final against the Penrith Panthers, scoring a try in the 30–42 loss. On 13 October 2013, Faitala-Mariner played for the Junior Kiwis against the Junior Kangaroos at second-row in the Kiwis' 26–38 loss. In 2014, Faitala-Mariner joined the Warriors' full-time squad and played in the 2014 Auckland Nines, and played in 23 New South Wales Cup matches for the Warriors. On 21 September 2014, Faitala-Mariner was named at second-row in the 2014 New South Wales Cup Team of the Year.

=== 2015 ===
In round 8 of the 2015 NRL season, Faitala-Mariner made his first grade NRL debut for the New Zealand Warriors against the Gold Coast Titans off the interchange bench in the Warriors' 28–32 loss at Mt Smart Stadium. Faitala-Mariner became the Warriors 200th debutant. In round 15, against the Gold Coast Titans, Faitala-Mariner scored his first NRL career try in the Warriors 36–14 win at Cbus Super Stadium. He finished his debut year in the NRL having played in 11 matches and scoring a try.

=== 2016 ===
On 5 April, after playing one match for the Warriors that season, Faitala-Mariner was released in an exchange for Shaun Lane as part of a deal between the Warriors and the Canterbury-Bankstown Bulldogs. In round 9, against the Parramatta Eels, Faitala-Mariner made his club debut for the Canterbury-Bankstown Bulldogs in the 12–20 loss at ANZ Stadium. On 7 May 2016, Faitala-Mariner made his international debut for Samoa, playing against Tonga in the 2016 Polynesian Cup off the interchange bench in the 18–6 win at Parramatta Stadium. Faitala-Mariner finished his early season move to the Bulldogs in the 2016 NRL season with him playing in 14 matches. On 8 October 2016, Faitala-Mariner represented Samoa in the Samoa vs. Fiji test match, where he started at second-row in the 20–18 loss in Apia, Samoa.

=== 2017 ===
In Round 16 against his former club the New Zealand Warriors, Faitala-Mariner scored his first club try for the Bulldogs in the 21–14 loss at Mt Smart Stadium. Faitala-Mariner finished the 2017 NRL season with him playing in 16 matches and scoring 1 try for the Bulldogs.

=== 2018 ===
Faitala-Mariner made 13 appearances for Canterbury-Bankstown in 2018 and scored 2 tries as the club endured a tough season on the field. At one point, the club were sitting second last on the table before upset wins against the Brisbane Broncos and St George ensured that they finished in 12th place avoiding the wooden spoon.

=== 2019 ===
Faitala-Mariner made 10 appearances for Canterbury-Bankstown in the 2019 NRL season as the club finished 12th on the table.

=== 2020 ===
Faitala-Mariner made 20 appearances for Canterbury and scored six tries in the 2020 NRL season. He finished as the sides joint top try scorer. The club finished in 15th place on the table, only avoiding the Wooden Spoon by for and against.

=== 2021 ===
On 23 March, it was announced that Faitala-Mariner would miss the rest of the 2021 NRL season after suffering a foot injury in Canterbury's loss to Penrith.

=== 2022 ===
After more than a year out of the game due to injury, Faitala-Mariner made his comeback in Canterbury's Round 11 loss to Wests Tigers at Leichhardt Oval. On 22 July, Faitala-Mariner signed on with the Canterbury club for a further three years, seeing him remain at Belmore until the end of the 2025 season. Faitala-Mariner played a total of 13 games for Canterbury in the 2022 NRL season as the club finished 12th on the table.

=== 2023 ===
Faitala-Mariner played a total of 14 games for Canterbury in the 2023 NRL season as the club finished 15th on the table.

=== 2024 ===
On 29 January, Faitala-Mariner was released from the final two years of his Canterbury contract to join St. George Illawarra ahead of the 2024 NRL season. In round 1 of the 2024 NRL season, he made his club debut for St. George Illawarra as they defeated the Gold Coast 28–4. He made 20 appearances for St. George Illawarra in the 2024 NRL season as the club finished 11th on the table.

=== 2025 ===
In September after St. George Illawarra's season ended, Faitala-Mariner was released by the club. Faitala-Mariner was limited to only four appearances in the 2025 NRL season. On 28 September, he played in St. George Illawarra's 30-12 NSW Cup Grand Final loss to New Zealand.

== Statistics ==
Year	Team	Games	Tries	Pts
2015	New Zealand Warriors	11	1	4
2016	New Zealand Warriors	1		
2016	Canterbury-Bankstown Bulldogs	14		
2017	Canterbury-Bankstown Bulldogs	16	1	4
2018	Canterbury-Bankstown Bulldogs	13	2	8
2019	Canterbury-Bankstown Bulldogs	10	2	8
2020	Canterbury-Bankstown Bulldogs	20	6	24
2021	Canterbury-Bankstown Bulldogs	2		
2022	Canterbury-Bankstown Bulldogs	13		
2023	Canterbury-Bankstown Bulldogs	14		
2024	St. George Illawarra Dragons	20	2	8
2025	St. George Illawarra Dragons	4		
	Totals	138	14	56
