= Siuatonga Likiliki =

Tonga international rugby league footballer

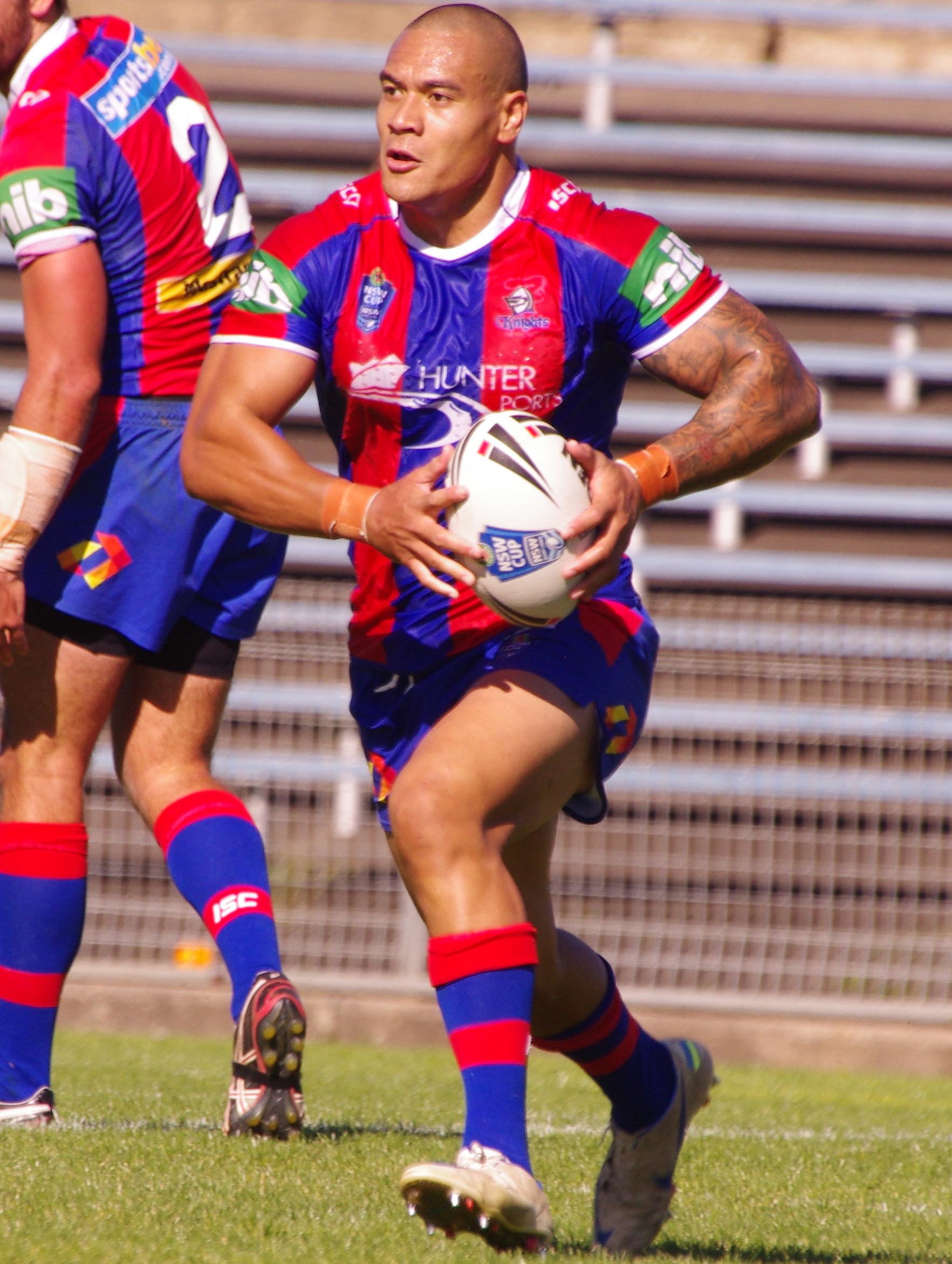

Personal information
- Born: 10 April 1990 (age 36) Auckland, New Zealand
- Height: 181 cm (5 ft 11 in)
- Weight: 97 kg (15 st 4 lb)

Playing information
- Position: Centre, Wing
Club
Years	Team	Pld	T	G	FG	P
2009	New Zealand Warriors	1	0	0	0	0
2011	Newcastle Knights	2	0	0	0	0
	Total	3	0	0	0	0
Representative
Years	Team	Pld	T	G	FG	P
2009–13	Tonga	4	2	0	0	8
- Source: As of 6 November 2014

Siuatonga Likiliki (born 10 April 1990), also known by the nickname of "Tonga", is a Tonga international rugby league footballer who plays as a centre and winger for the Burleigh Bears in the Queensland Cup. He previously played for the New Zealand Warriors and Newcastle Knights in the NRL.

== Background ==
Born in Auckland, New Zealand, Likiliki is of Tongan descent and played his junior football for the Marist Saints in the Auckland Rugby League competition, while attending Mount Albert Grammar School, and the Auckland Lions in the Bartercard Cup. He was then signed by the New Zealand Warriors.

== Playing career ==
From 2008 to 2010, Likiliki played for the New Zealand Warriors' NYC team, scoring 29 tries in 50 games. In Round 23 of the 2009 NRL season Likiliki made his NRL debut for the Warriors against Parramatta.

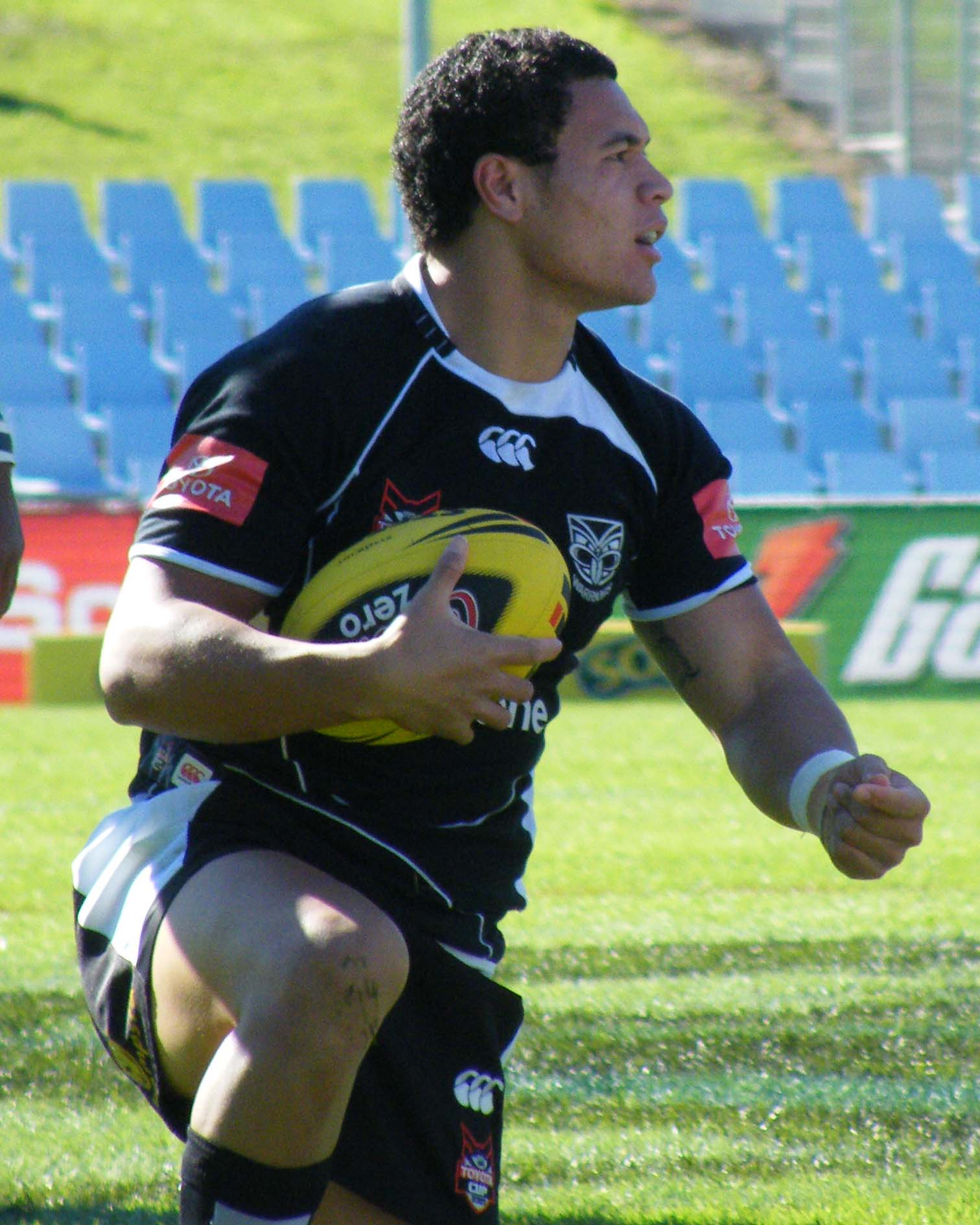
Likiliki playing for the Warriors in 2009.

Likiliki became the eighth player to be promoted to the Warriors first-grade team from the under-20s squad since the competition began in 2008. In September 2009, Likiliki was named at centre in the 2009 NYC Team of the Year. He was again named at centre in the 2010 NYC Team of the Year. In October 2009, Likiliki played for Tonga against the New Zealand national rugby league team during a one-off test. He played 2 more games for Tonga in the 2009 Pacific Cup.

In June 2010, Likiliki signed a two-year contract with the Newcastle Knights starting in 2011. On 3 October 2010, Likiliki scored a try in the Warriors' win over South Sydney in the 2010 NYC Grand Final, which was his last game for the Warriors. In October 2010, Likiliki was selected for the Junior Kiwis to play the Junior Kangaroos. Likiliki made his debut for the Newcastle side in Round 25 of the 2011 NRL season after regular centre Adam MacDougall was ruled out with injury. On 12 September 2012, Likiliki was named at centre in the 2012 New South Wales Cup Team of the Year.

In 2013, Likiliki played for Tonga against fierce Pacific rivals Samoa in the Polynesian Cup that was played at Penrith Stadium in Penrith, New South Wales, Australia. He scored 2 tries in Tonga's 36-4 win over Samoa. Later in the year, Likiliki played in Tonga's unsuccessful 2013 Rugby League World Cup campaign. He only made 1 appearance, and that was coming off the bench against Italy. On 14 August 2013, Likiliki signed a one-year contract with the Gold Coast Titans starting in 2014. He failed to make a first-grade appearance in 2014 and was released by the Titans at the end of the year, joining the Burleigh Bears in 2015.
