= Tautalatasi Tasi =

New Zealand rugby league & union player

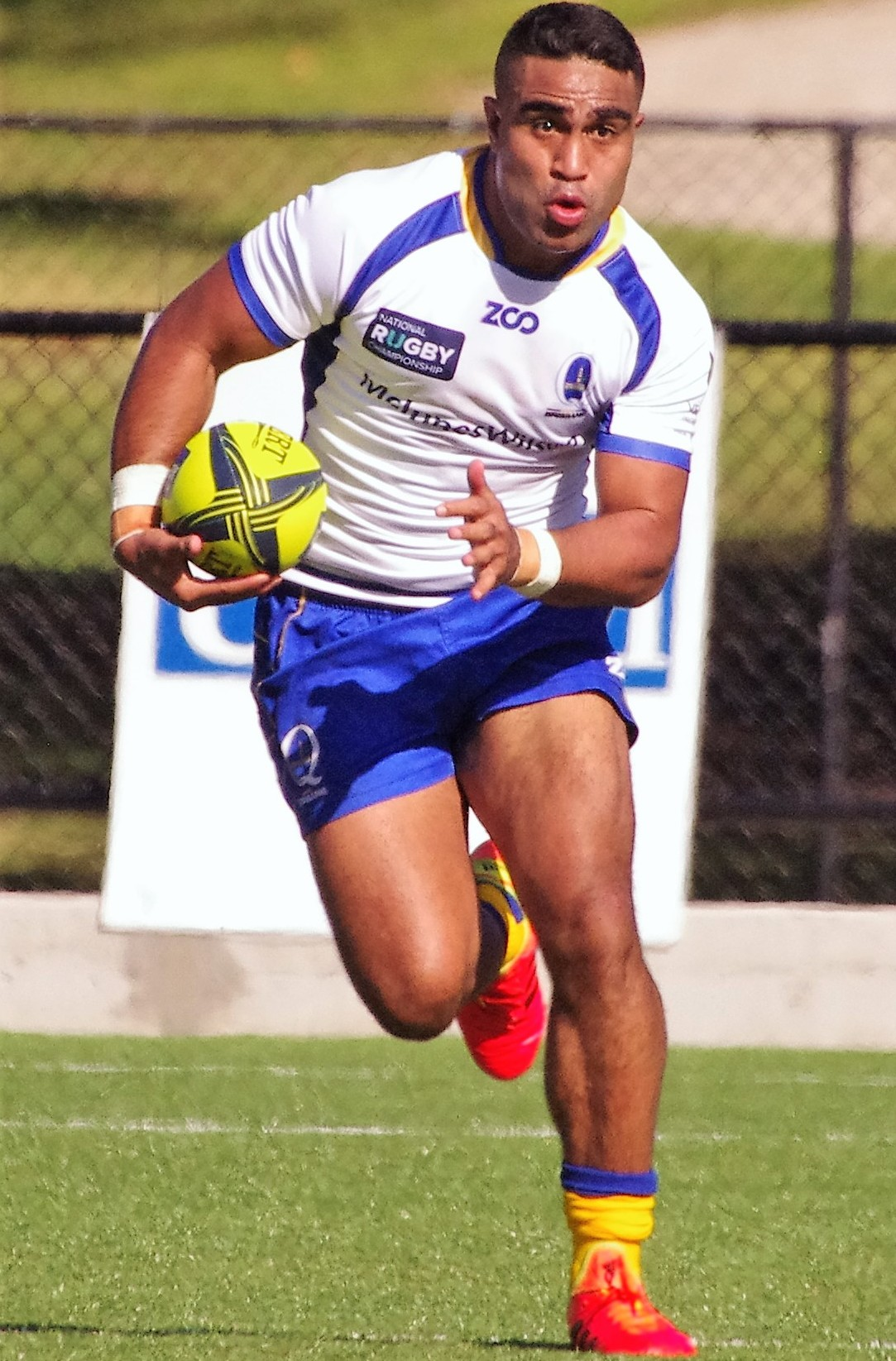
- Tasi playing for Brisbane City in 2018

Personal information
- Born: 22 November 1994 (age 32) Auckland, New Zealand
- Height: 179 cm (5 ft 10 in)
- Weight: 95 kg (14 st 13 lb)

Playing information

Rugby league
- Position: Wing, Centre, Second-row
Club
Years	Team	Pld	T	G	FG	P
2016	South Sydney	2	0	0	0	0
Representative
Years	Team	Pld	T	G	FG	P
2017	NSW Residents	1	0	0	0	0

Rugby union
- Position: Centre
Club
Years	Team	Pld	T	G	FG	P
2018	Brisbane City	5	2	0	0	10
2019	Melbourne Rebels	5	0	0	1	0
2019	NSW Waratahs	2	0	0	0	0
2020	Sunwolves	5	1	0	0	5
2022 2024–	Tokyo Gas Rugby Club	36	33	0	0	165
2023	Toronto Arrows	10	2	0	0	10
2024	Houston SaberCats	24	9	0	0	45
	Total	87	47	0	1	235
- Source: As of 27 March 2024.=
- Relatives: Lama Tasi (brother); Raymond Faitala-Mariner (cousin)

Tautalatasi Tasi (born 22 November 1994) is a New Zealand professional rugby union player who currently plays for the Houston SaberCats in Major League Rugby (MLR). He also plays as a wing for the Sunwolves in Super Rugby. He previously played rugby league for the South Sydney Rabbitohs in the National Rugby League. He plays at wing, centre and second-row.

== Background ==
Born in Auckland, New Zealand, Tasi is of Samoan descent and moved to Queensland, Australia at a young age. He played his junior rugby league for the Goodna Eagles, before being signed by the Ipswich Jets in the Queensland Cup.

Tasi is the younger brother of former Sydney Roosters and Brisbane Broncos player Lama Tasi, and the cousin of Canterbury-Bankstown Bulldogs player Raymond Faitala-Mariner.

== Playing career ==
=== Early career ===
In 2013 and 2014, Tasi played for the Ipswich Jets. In May 2014, he signed a 2-year contract with the Canterbury-Bankstown Bulldogs starting effective immediately, playing for their NYC team for the rest of the year. In 2015, he began pre-season training with the Bulldogs' NRL squad but did not make an appearance for their first-grade team, instead playing for their New South Wales Cup team for the season.

=== 2016 ===
In 2016, Tasi joined the North Sydney Bears in the Intrust Super Premiership NSW. During the season, he was elevated to the South Sydney Rabbitohs' NRL squad. In round 16 of the 2016 NRL season, he made his NRL debut for the Rabbitohs against the Penrith Panthers, coming off the bench. He spent most of the season playing with North Sydney where he made 13 appearances and scored 8 tries for the season.

=== 2017 ===
In May, Tasi played for the New South Wales Residents against the Queensland Residents. On 5 August, he scored 5 tries in a game for North Sydney against the Wests Tigers at Leichhardt Oval, North Sydney winning the match 42-10. On 22 November 2017, Tasi announced on his official Instagram account that after 3 seasons he was leaving Norths and relocating back to Queensland.

=== 2018 & Beyond ===
Tasi spent the 2018 playing Queensland Premier Rugby for Souths, alongside Reds & Wallabies discards Quade Cooper & Karmichael Hunt, his performances for the premier grade side earned him a spot in the Brisbane City NRC squad for 2018. Tasi then joined the Rebels in 2019 with Cooper as an extended pre-season squad member, making appearances in their pre-season trials and in a mid-season game for a Melbourne XV against Japan A (made up of flow-over Sunvwolves players & rookie test players). In 2020, Tasi moved to Gordon Rugby Club based out of Sydney's North Shore playing in their premier competition, Shute Shield. In the 2021-2022 season, he played for Bond University in Queensland Premier Rugby. He then moved to Tokyo Gas Rugby Club for the 2022-2023 season. Following this, Tasi moved to the Toronto Arrows in Major League Rugby for the 2023 season. After the club took a hiatus following the 2023 season, Tasi signed with the Houston SaberCats for the 2024 season.

== Super Rugby statistics ==
As of 16 June 2019

Season	Team	Games	Starts	Sub	Mins	Tries	Cons	Pens	Drops	Points	Yel	Red
2019	Rebels	0	0	0	0	0	0	0	0	0	0	0
2019	Waratahs	1	0	1	16	0	0	0	0	0	0	0
Total		1	0	1	16	0	0	0	0	0	0	0

== Honours ==
Houston SaberCats

- All Major League Ruby Second team (2025)
