= 2011 NRL Under-20s season =

- Teams: 16
- Premiers: New Zealand Warriors (2nd title)
- Minor premiers: New Zealand Warriors (1st title)
- Matches played: 201
- Points scored: 10439
- Wooden spoon: Manly (1st spoon)
- Player of the Year: Tariq Sims
- Top point-scorer: Dylan Collier (260)
- Top try-scorer: Omar Sleimankhel (26)

The 2011 NRL Under-20s season was the fourth season of the National Rugby League's Under-20s competition. The competition, known commercially as the 2011 Toyota Cup due to sponsorship from Toyota, was solely for under-20s players. The draw and structure of the competition mirrored that of the 2011 NRL Telstra Premiership season.

== Ladder ==
2011 National Youth Competition season
| Pos. | Team | Pld | W | D | L | B | PF | PA | PD | Pts |
|---|---|---|---|---|---|---|---|---|---|---|
| 1 | New Zealand Warriors (P) | 24 | 19 | 1 | 4 | 2 | 851 | 494 | +357 | 43 |
| 2 | North Queensland Cowboys | 24 | 17 | 0 | 7 | 2 | 758 | 509 | +249 | 38 |
| 3 | Cronulla-Sutherland Sharks | 24 | 16 | 1 | 7 | 2 | 707 | 600 | +107 | 37 |
| 4 | Melbourne Storm | 24 | 16 | 0 | 8 | 2 | 678 | 517 | +161 | 36 |
| 5 | Sydney Roosters | 24 | 15 | 1 | 8 | 2 | 639 | 523 | +116 | 35 |
| 6 | Canterbury-Bankstown Bulldogs | 24 | 14 | 0 | 10 | 2 | 659 | 458 | +201 | 32 |
| 7 | Wests Tigers | 24 | 12 | 2 | 10 | 2 | 607 | 529 | +78 | 30 |
| 8 | Newcastle Knights | 24 | 12 | 1 | 11 | 2 | 638 | 660 | -22 | 29 |
| 9 | Brisbane Broncos | 24 | 11 | 2 | 11 | 2 | 752 | 551 | +201 | 28 |
| 10 | Penrith Panthers | 24 | 12 | 0 | 12 | 2 | 558 | 709 | -151 | 28 |
| 11 | St. George Illawarra Dragons | 24 | 10 | 2 | 12 | 2 | 562 | 594 | -32 | 26 |
| 12 | Parramatta Eels | 24 | 10 | 1 | 13 | 2 | 547 | 556 | -9 | 25 |
| 13 | Canberra Raiders | 24 | 8 | 1 | 15 | 2 | 683 | 749 | -66 | 21 |
| 14 | Gold Coast Titans | 24 | 5 | 1 | 18 | 2 | 467 | 779 | -312 | 15 |
| 15 | South Sydney Rabbitohs | 24 | 4 | 1 | 19 | 2 | 454 | 881 | -427 | 13 |
| 16 | Manly Warringah Sea Eagles | 24 | 4 | 0 | 20 | 2 | 432 | 843 | -411 | 12 |

== Finals series ==
Qualifying finals
1 | New Zealand Warriors | 54
8 | North Queensland Cowboys | 48
2 | Cronulla Sharks | 28
7 | Melbourne Storm | 26
3 | Sydney Roosters | 10
6 | Canterbury Bulldogs | 12
4 | Wests Tigers | 26
5 | Newcastle Knights | 6

Semifinals
4W | Melbourne Storm | 20
2L | Canterbury Bulldogs | 22
3W | Cronulla Sharks | 14
1L | Sydney Roosters | 4

Preliminary finals
1W | New Zealand Warriors | 64
Canterbury Bulldogs | 0
2W | North Queensland Cowboys | 38
Cronulla Sharks | 14

Final
New Zealand Warriors | 31
North Queensland Cowboys | 30

| Home | Score | Away | Match Information |
| Home | Score | Away | Date and Time | Venue | Referee |
|---|---|---|---|---|---|
Qualifying Finals
| (4) Melbourne Storm | 26-10 | (5) Sydney Roosters | 11 September 2011, 1:30pm | AAMI Park, Melbourne |
| (3) Cronulla Sharks | 28-12 | (6) Canterbury Bulldogs | 10 September 2011, 6:00pm | Sydney Football Stadium, Sydney |
| (2) North Queensland Cowboys | 48-26 | (7) Wests Tigers | 9 September 2011, 5:15pm | ANZ Stadium, Sydney |
| (1) New Zealand Warriors | 54-6 | (8) Newcastle Knights | 10 September 2011, 4:15pm | Suncorp Stadium, Brisbane |
Semi-finals
| Melbourne Storm | 20-22 | Canterbury Bulldogs | 16 September 2011, 5:15pm | Suncorp Stadium, Brisbane |
| Cronulla Sharks | 14-4 | Sydney Roosters | 17 September 2011, 5:15pm | Sydney Football Stadium, Sydney |
Preliminary Finals
| North Queensland Cowboys | 38-14 | Cronulla Sharks | 23 September 2011, 5:15pm | Sydney Football Stadium, Sydney |
| New Zealand Warriors | 64-0 | Canterbury Bulldogs | 24 September 2011, 5:15pm | AAMI Park, Melbourne |
Grand Final
| New Zealand Warriors | 31-30 | North Queensland Cowboys | 2 October 2011, 2:15pm | ANZ Stadium |

== Player statistics ==
=== Leading try scorers ===
Top 10 try scorers
| Pos | Name | Tries | Team |
|---|---|---|---|
| 1 | Omar Slaimankhel | 26 | New Zealand |
| 2 | Michael Parker-Walshe | 21 | North Queensland |
| 3 | Marmin Barba | 19 | Parramatta |
| 4= | Tautau Moga | 18 | Sydney |
| 4= | Luke Pickerd | 18 | Cronulla |
| 6= | Daniel Abou-Sleiman | 17 | Canterbury |
| 6= | Dale Copley | 17 | Brisbane |
| 6= | Mahe Fonua | 17 | Melbourne |
| 6= | Adam Henry | 17 | New Zealand |
| 10 | Wayne Ulugia | 16 | North Queensland |

==== Most tries in a game ====
Top 5 most tries in a game
| | Player | Team | Opponent | Round | Tries |
|---|---|---|---|---|---|
| 1= | Matthew Berwick | Brisbane | North Queensland | 23 | 4 |
| 1= | Kyle Feldt | North Queensland | Newcastle | 18 | 4 |
| 1= | Jerome Leedy | Brisbane | Manly | 26 | 4 |
| 1= | Tautau Moga | Sydney | Cronulla | 24 | 4 |
| 1= | James Tedesco | Wests Tigers | Melbourne | 15 | 4 |
| 1= | Jack Wighton | Canberra | Gold Coast | 4 | 4 |

=== Leading point scorers ===
Top 10 overall point scorers
| | Player | Team | T | G | FG | Pts |
|---|---|---|---|---|---|---|
| 1 | Dylan Collier | New Zealand | 14 | 102 | - | 260 |
| 2 | Kyle Feldt | North Queensland | 14 | 87 | - | 230 |
| 3 | Matt McGahan | Melbourne | 6 | 85 | - | 194 |
| 4 | Chris Medcalf | Canberra | 9 | 78 | - | 192 |
| 5 | Chris Taripo | Sydney | 10 | 53 | - | 146 |
| 6 | Mitchell Frei | Brisbane | 4 | 62 | - | 140 |
| 7 | Jacob Miller | Wests Tigers | 5 | 54 | - | 128 |
| 8 | Kane Gillies | St. George Illawarra | 8 | 44 | - | 120 |
| 9 | Ali Hijazi | Cronulla | 4 | 50 | - | 116 |
| 10 | Cameron Breust | Parramatta | 4 | 47 | 1 | 111 |

==== Most points in a game ====
Top 5 most points in a game
| | Player | Team | Opponent | Round | Tries | Goals | Field Goals | Points |
|---|---|---|---|---|---|---|---|---|
| 1 | Kyle Feldt | North Queensland | Newcastle | 18 | 4 | 5 | - | 26 |
| 2 | Blake Austin | Penrith | Cronulla | 3 | 3 | 6 | - | 24 |
| 3 | Chris Taripo | Sydney | Canberra | 17 | 2 | 7 | - | 22 |
| 5= | Kane Gillies | St. George Illawarra | Manly | 16 | 2 | 7 | - | 22 |
| 5= | Chris Medcalf | Canberra | Manly | 9 | 1 | 9 | - | 22 |

=== Leading goal scorers ===
Top 10 goal scorers
| Pos | Name | Goals | Team |
|---|---|---|---|
| 1 | Dylan Collier | 102 | New Zealand |
| 2 | Kyle Feldt | 87 | North Queensland |
| 3 | Matt McGahan | 85 | Melbourne |
| 4 | Chris Medcalf | 78 | Canberra |
| 5 | Mitchell Frei | 62 | Brisbane |
| 6 | Jacob Miller | 54 | Wests Tigers |
| 7 | Chris Taripo | 53 | Sydney |
| 8 | Ali Hijazi | 51 | Cronulla |
| 9 | Cameron Breust | 47 | Parramatta |
| 10 | Kane Gillies | 44 | St. George Illawarra |

==== Most goals in a game ====
Top 5 most goals in a game
| | Player | Team | Opponent | Round | Goals |
|---|---|---|---|---|---|
| 1= | Dylan Collier | New Zealand | South Sydney | 11 | 9 |
| 1= | Mitchell Frei | Brisbane | Newcastle | 5 | 9 |
| 1= | Chris Medcalf | Canberra | Gold Coast | 4 | 9 |
| 1= | Chris Medcalf | Canberra | Manly | 9 | 9 |
| 1= | Jacob Miller | Wests Tigers | Melbourne | 15 | 9 |
| 1= | Daniel Wallace | Brisbane | South Sydney | 25 | 9 |

=== Leading field goal scorers ===
Top 10 field goal scorers
| Pos | Name | Team | Field goals |
|---|---|---|---|
| 1= | Chad Townsend | Cronulla | 2 |
| 1= | Jason Whebe | Parramatta | 2 |
| 3= | Jay Bonnell | Wests Tigers | 1 |
| 3= | Cameron Breust | Parramatta | 1 |
| 3= | Ryley Jacks | Sydney | 1 |
| 3= | Penani Manumalealii | Cronulla | 1 |
| 3= | Jordan Meads | New Zealand | 1 |
| 3= | Jordan Rankin | Gold Coast | 1 |
| 3= | Aiden Sezer | Canterbury | 1 |
| 3= | Sam Williams | Canberra | 1 |

== Club statistics ==
=== Biggest Wins ===
Top 10 biggest winning margins
| Pos | Winning team | Losing team | Round | Score | Margin |
|---|---|---|---|---|---|
| 1 | Brisbane | Manly | 26 | 64-0 | 64 |
| 1 = | New Zealand | Canterbury | Preliminary Final | 64-0 | 64 |
| 2 | New Zealand | South Sydney | 11 | 62-6 | 56 |
| 3 | Canterbury | Manly | 24 | 52-0 | 52 |
| 4= | Brisbane | Newcastle | 5 | 54-6 | 48 |
| 4= | Brisbane | South Sydney | 25 | 54-6 | 48 |
| 4= | North Queensland | South Sydney | 24 | 58-10 | 48 |
| 7 | Newcastle | Penrith | 1 | 62-16 | 46 |
| 8 | Canterbury | Manly | 13 | 50-6 | 44 |
| 9= | Sydney | Canterbury | 21 | 50-8 | 42 |
| 9= | New Zealand | Sydney | 5 | 42-0 | 42 |

=== Winning Streaks ===
| Winning streak still active |

Top 5 longest winning streaks
| Pos | Team | First win | Round | Last win | Round | Games won |
|---|---|---|---|---|---|---|
| 1 | Sydney | 26-14 vs Newcastle | 16 | Current Streak | - | 11 |
| 2= | Canterbury | 38-16 vs South Sydney | 7 | 30-26 vs Cronulla | 15 | 7 |
| 2= | Cronulla | 28-16 vs Gold Coast | 16 | 38-18 vs Gold Coast | 22 | 7 |
| 2= | Melbourne | 34-30 vs Canterbury | 4 | 24-12 vs Canberra | 10 | 7 |
| 5 | New Zealand | 56-26 vs Penrith | 8 | 30-16 vs Wests Tigers | 14 | 6 |

- QF = Qualifying Finals
- SF = Semi-finals
- PF = Preliminary Finals
- GF = Grand Final

=== Losing Streaks ===
| Losing streak still active |

Top 5 longest losing streaks
| Pos | Team | First Loss | Round | Last Loss | Round | Games lost |
|---|---|---|---|---|---|---|
| 1 | South Sydney | 16-17 vs Sydney | 19 | Current Streak | - | 8 |
| 2= | Canberra | 20-56 vs Sydney | 17 | 8-24 vs Newcastle | 22 | 6 |
| 2= | Manly | 20-21 vs Cronulla | 5 | 32-34 vs Gold Coast | 10 | 6 |
| 2= | Manly | 16-30 vs Parramatta | 15 | 18-26 vs Sydney | 22 | 6 |
| 2= | South Sydney | 16-38 vs Canterbury | 7 | 16-40 vs Melbourne | 13 | 6 |

- QF = Qualifying Finals
- SF = Semi-finals
- PF = Preliminary Finals
- GF = Grand Final

=== Team of the Year ===
On 30 August 2011, the 2011 Toyota Cup team of the Year was announced. The team included 15 first time winners including coach John Ackland, while Dane Gagai and Dale Finucane had previously been named in the 2010 Team of the Year. Kenneath Bromwich and Jesse Bromwich, a member of the 2009 Team of the Year, became the first brothers to be selected in a team of the Year.

| Position | Player | Club |
|---|---|---|
| Fullback | Omar Slaimankhel | New Zealand |
| Wing | Dane Gagai | Brisbane |
| Centre | Konrad Hurrell | New Zealand |
| Centre | Mahe Fonua | Melbourne |
| Wing | James Roberts | South Sydney |
| Five-Eight | Carlos Tuimavave | New Zealand |
| Halfback | Jacob Miller | Wests Tigers |
| Prop | Kane Evans | Sydney |
| Hooker | Kurt Baptiste | Brisbane |
| Prop | Dale Finucane | Canterbury |
| Second-Row | Jason Taumalolo | North Queensland |
| Second-Row | Alex McKinnon | St. George Illawarra |
| Lock | Tyrone Peachey | Cronulla |
| Bench | Kenneath Bromwich | Melbourne |
| Bench | Tim Lafai | Canterbury |
| Bench | Jack de Belin | St. George Illawarra |
| Bench | Kyle Feldt | North Queensland |
| Coach | John Ackland | New Zealand |
