= Elijah Niko =

NZ rugby union & league player (born 1990)

- Born: 11 September 1990 (age 36) Wellington, New Zealand
- Height: 1.94 m (6 ft 4 in)
- Weight: 108 kg (17 st 0 lb)
- School: St John's College (Hastings)

Rugby union career
- Position: Wing Centre
- Current team: Stade Aurilac
Senior career
Years	Team	Apps	(Points)
	Section Paloise	192	(125)
2015–16	AS Béziers Hérault		
2016–18	Manu Samoa		
2018–2019	Ealing Trailfinders	14	(35)
2019–2020	Manu Samoa 7s		

Elijah Niko (born 11 September 1990) is a New Zealand rugby football player who currently plays rugby union for The Stade Aurilacois.

== Career ==
Niko grew up playing rugby league. In 2005 while still in High School Niko become the youngest ever player at the age of 16 years and 2 months to represent the Hawke's Bay Unicorns in the Batercard Cup premiership competition.

He signed with the New Zealand Warriors in 2008 and played for their under-20s side. He was part of the team that won the 2010 Toyota Cup. He ended his Warriors career having scored 21 tries in 36 games.

He joined the Melbourne Storm for the 2011 season also playing for the Easts Tigers club, the feeder club to the Storm where he was named the Queensland Cup winger of the year .

Niko later switched codes to rugby union He signed a contract to play in France with Section Paloise in the Top 14. As well as being named in the team of the year he was the top try scorer for 2 consecutive years with the club totaling 25 tries. He won the French championship with Section Paloise in 2015 with their victory over Montauban.

He later signed a three-year contract with Béziers. On 27 November 2018, Niko was granted an immediate release from his contract to join Yorkshire Carnegie in the RFU Championship for the 2018–19 season. Rumors were circulating about a possible return to Rugby League with Niko seen training with Leeds Rhinos numerous times. Niko signed for Ealing Trailfinders for the 2019–20 season.

He signed for Bedford Blues ahead of the 2020–21 season.

In 2021 Niko was included in the Manu Samoa squad ahead of their one-off match against the Barbarians.

In May 2023 Niko made his Manu Samoa 7s debut during the final leg of the HSBC world 7s in London picking up a medal with their victory over the All Blacks 7s.

== Personal life ==
. He is the cousin of current Rugby players Alex Tulou, Taleta Tupuola, Mathew Luamanu and Albert Anae. He is also the cousin of New Zealand singer and songwriter Victor J Sefo. He is of Samoan descent.
