= Lama Tasi =

Samoa international rugby league footballer

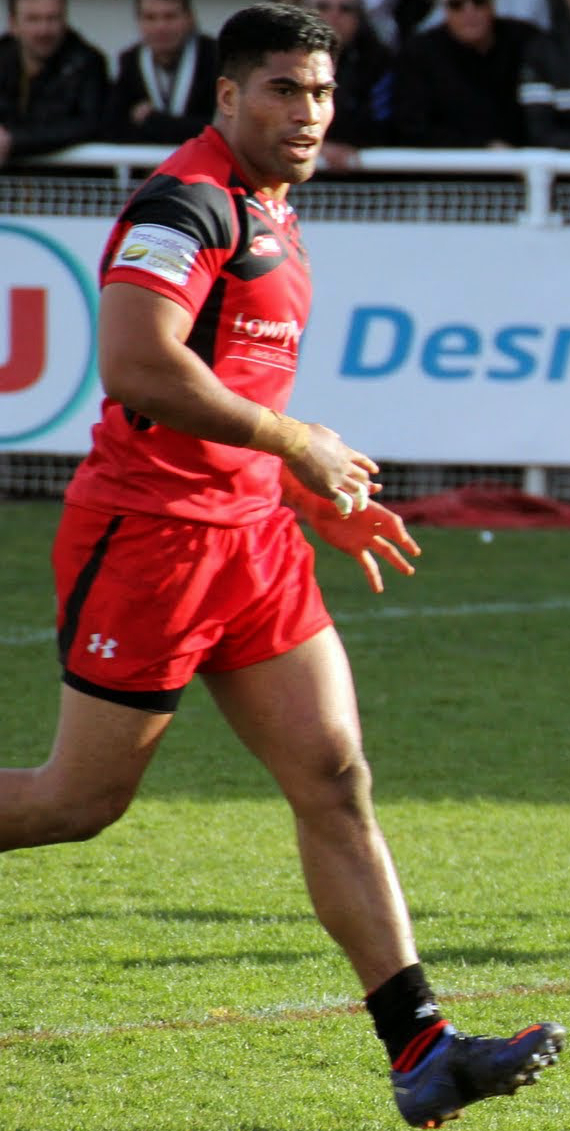

Personal information
- Born: 3 May 1990 (age 36) Auckland, New Zealand
- Height: 190 cm (6 ft 3 in)
- Weight: 104 kg (16 st 5 lb)

Playing information
- Position: Prop, Second-row
Club
Years	Team	Pld	T	G	FG	P
2011–13	Sydney Roosters	30	2	0	0	8
2013	Brisbane Broncos	7	0	0	0	0
2014–15	Salford Red Devils	46	5	0	0	20
2016	St Helens	19	0	0	0	0
2017–18	Salford Red Devils	53	3	0	0	12
2019	Warrington Wolves	17	0	0	0	0
	Total	172	10	0	0	40
Representative
Years	Team	Pld	T	G	FG	P
2013	Samoa	1	0	0	0	0
- Source: As of 5 September 2019
- Relatives: Tautalatasi Tasi (brother); Raymond Faitala-Mariner (cousin)

Lama Tasi (born 3 May 1990) is a former Samoa international rugby league footballer who played as a prop.

He played for the Sydney Roosters and the Brisbane Broncos in the National Rugby League, and the Salford Red Devils in two separate spells, St Helens and the Warrington Wolves in the Super League.

== Background ==
Tasi was born in Auckland, New Zealand. His family moved to Australia when he was three years old, settling in the Ipswich suburb of Riverview, Queensland. The oldest of his seven siblings, Tasi then moved to the nearby suburb of Goodna, Queensland.

He began playing rugby league for the local club, the Goodna Eagles. Tasi would represent the Queensland Under 12s state side before taking up a scholarship at Ipswich Grammar School.

== Early years ==
After finishing his education, Tasi moved to Sydney to play in the National Youth Competition for the Manly-Warringah Sea Eagles in 2009 and 2010, making the team of the year in 2010 and representing the Junior Kiwis. He then signed with the Sydney Roosters for the 2011 season.

== Club career ==
=== Sydney Roosters ===
Tasi made his début in 2011 in the Roosters round 8 match against the Gold Coast Titans. Coming off the bench, Tasi made his presence felt by putting a big hit on the Titans, NSW and Australian representative forward Greg Bird. Tasi played 9 more games for the Roosters in his début season, starting twice.

In December 2011, Tasi pledged his allegiance to the Queensland State of Origin and Australian national sides and was named in Queensland's 14 man emerging squad for 2012.

=== Brisbane Broncos ===
In June 2013, Tasi was granted a release from the Roosters and signed with the Brisbane Broncos for the remainder of the 2013 season.

=== Salford Red Devils ===
On 24 September 2013, it was confirmed Lama Tasi was to join the Salford Red Devils in 2014.

=== St Helens ===
On 29 May 2015, it was confirmed Lama Tasi was to join the 2014 Super League Champions St. Helens on a two-year deal starting in 2016.

=== Salford Red Devils ===
Salford Red Devils have re-signed Samoa international forward Lama Tasi on an initial one-year contract. The 26-year-old left to join St Helens at the end of 2015 on a two-year deal after 57 appearances for the club.

=== Warrington Wolves ===
Warrington Wolves announced the signing of Lama Tasi in October 2018. He made his competitive debut vs Hull Kingston Rovers in round 2 of the season. gaining heritage number 1150.

== International career ==
On 20 April 2013, Lama made his international debut, playing for Samoa in their 2013 Polynesian Cup match against fierce Pacific rivals Tonga.

== Personal life ==
Lama is the older brother of former South Sydney Rabbitohs player Tautalatasi Tasi, and the Cousin of Canterbury Bulldogs player Raymond Faitala-Mariner.
