= Dylan Collier =

NZ rugby union & league player

- Born: 27 April 1991 (age 35) Ōpōtiki, New Zealand
- Height: 1.94 m (6 ft 4 in)
- Weight: 101 kg (223 lb)
- School: Ōpōtiki College

Rugby union career
- Position(s): Centre, Wing
Senior career
Years	Team	Apps	(Points)
2013–2015	Waikato	12	(5)
2016	Southland	9	(0)
- Correct as of 21 July 2024
International career
Years	Team	Apps	(Points)
2015–	New Zealand 7s	317	(390)
- Correct as of 21 July 2024
Medal record
Men's rugby sevens
Representing New Zealand
Summer Olympics
Silver medal – second place	2020 Tokyo	Team competition
Commonwealth Games
Bronze medal – third place	2022 Birmingham	Team competition
Gold medal – first place	2018 Gold Coast	Team competition

Dylan Collier (born 27 April 1991) is a New Zealand professional rugby union player who plays as a forward and captains the New Zealand national sevens team.

== Club career ==
A goal kicking winger, Collier was a New Zealand Warriors junior and played in their 2011 National Youth Competition Grand Final winning side. In 2012 Collier played for the Auckland Vulcans in the NSW Cup.

Collier signed for Waikato in 2013 and made his New Zealand rugby sevens debut in 2015 after playing for Waikato at the National Sevens Championship. He joined the Southland Stags for the 2016 Mitre 10 Cup.

== International career ==
Collier was part of the All Blacks Sevens squad that won a bronze medal at the 2022 Commonwealth Games in Birmingham.

In 2024, He led New Zealand at the Paris Olympics.
