= Glen Fisiiahi =

Tonga international rugby league & union footballer

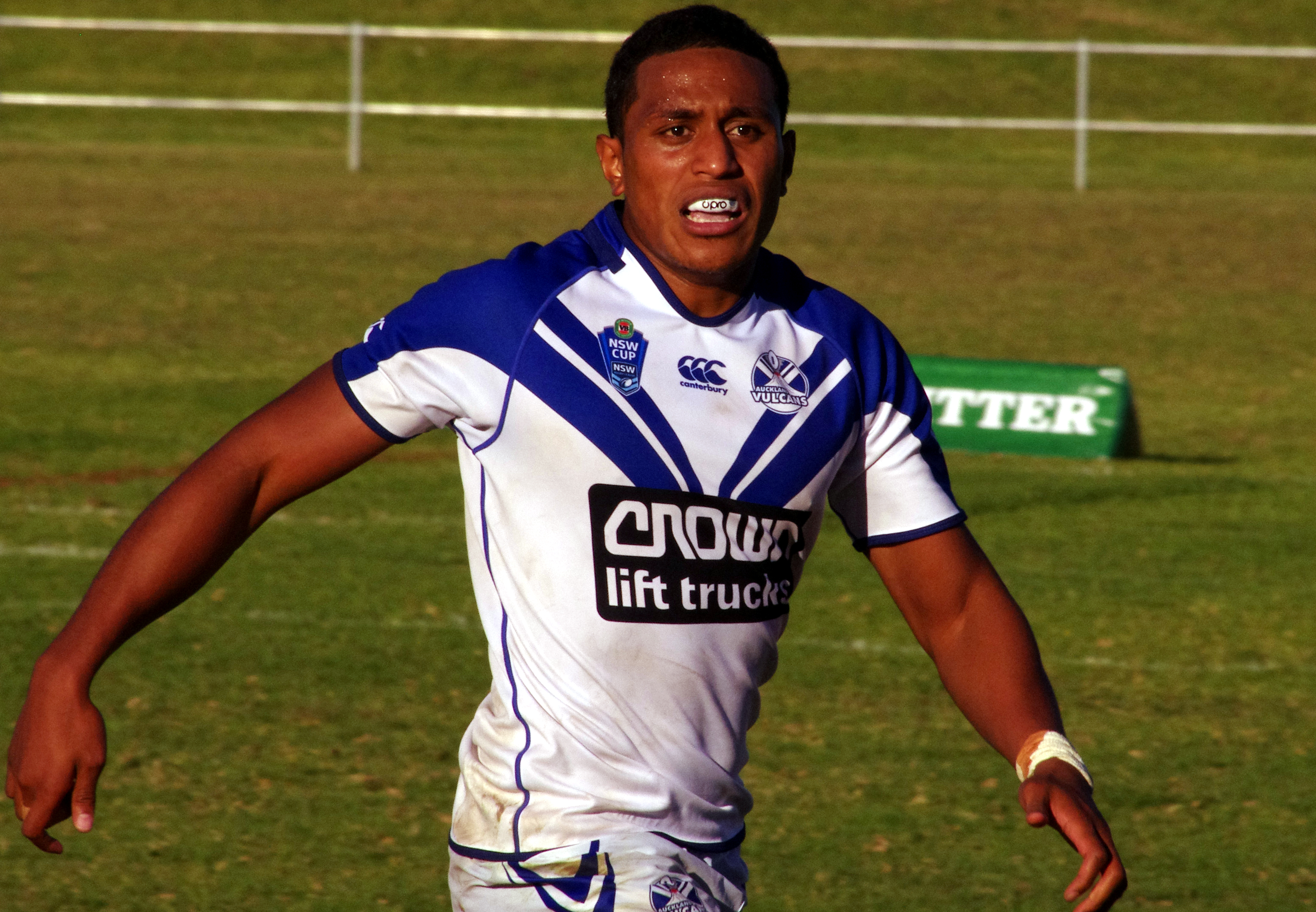

Personal information
- Born: 2 December 1990 (age 35) Auckland, New Zealand
- Height: 184 cm (6 ft 0 in)
- Weight: 95 kg (14 st 13 lb)

Playing information

Rugby league
- Position: Fullback, Wing
Club
| Years | Team | Pld | T | G | FG | P |
|---|---|---|---|---|---|---|
| 2011–15 | New Zealand Warriors | 25 | 15 | 0 | 0 | 60 |
Representative
| Years | Team | Pld | T | G | FG | P |
| 2013 | Tonga | 3 | 2 | 0 | 0 | 8 |

Rugby union
Club
| Years | Team | Pld | T | G | FG | P |
|---|---|---|---|---|---|---|
| 2016–17 | Chiefs | 4 | 1 | 0 | 0 | 5 |
| 2016– | Counties Manukau | 11 | 0 | 0 | 0 | 0 |
| | Total | 15 | 1 | 0 | 0 | 5 |
- Relatives: David Fisiiahi (brother); Paul Fisiiahi (brother)

Glen Fisiiahi (born 2 December 1990) is a rugby league and rugby union footballer of Tongan and Niuean descent. He previously played rugby league professionally for the New Zealand Warriors in the National Rugby League where he played as a fullback and wing and has represented the Tonga international rugby league team.

== Background ==
Fisiiahi was born in Auckland, New Zealand.

== Early years ==
Fisiiahi is from a well known league family that includes the twin brothers Paul and David Fisiiahi. Fisiiahi was an Ellerslie Eagles junior in Auckland Rugby League competitions and represented the Counties Manukau under-18's. Fisiiahi also played rugby union at his high school, Wesley College, and represented the New Zealand Secondary Schools Sevens team. Fisiiahi was the school's sports dux in 2008. While playing for the Junior Warriors Fisiiahi completed a Diploma in Sport and Recreation at AUT University. Fisiiahi made his debut for the New Zealand Warriors' Toyota Cup (Under-20s) team in 2009, playing in three matches. He also played for the Auckland Vulcans in the New South Wales Cup. In 2010 he became one of the stars of the team, scoring 20 tries in 26 matches, and was a part of the 2010 Toyota Cup Grand Final winning team. Fisiiahi was also involved in an embarrassing moment that saw him celebrate a try before scoring, only to be tackled and have the ball knocked out of his hands. Fisiiahi finished his Toyota Cup career with twenty eight appearances and twenty tries. He is eligible for New Zealand, Tonga and Niue. At the end of 2010 Fisiiahi was named in the Junior Kiwis squad that drew a two match series with the Junior Kangaroos.

== Rugby league career ==
=== 2011 ===
After scoring five tries in four trials during the 2011 pre-season, Fisiiahi made his NRL debut for the New Zealand Warriors in Round 1 of the 2011 NRL season against the Parramatta Eels at Eden Park on the wing in the Warriors' 24–18 loss. Fisiiahi being named ahead of Kevin Locke, Krisnan Inu and Bill Tupou. After playing only one NRL match, On 30 March 2011, Fisiiahi signed a four-year deal to keep him at the Warriors until the end of 2015. In Fisiiahi's next match in Round 4 against the Cronulla-Sutherland Sharks at Owen Delany Park at Taupō, Fisiiahi scored his first and second NRL tries in the Warriors 26–18 win. Fisiiahi played in the Auckland Vulcans 30-28 New South Wales Cup Grand Final loss to the Canterbury-Bankstown Bulldogs. Fisiiahi finished his debut year in the NRL with him playing in 4 matches and scoring 2 tries for the Warriors.

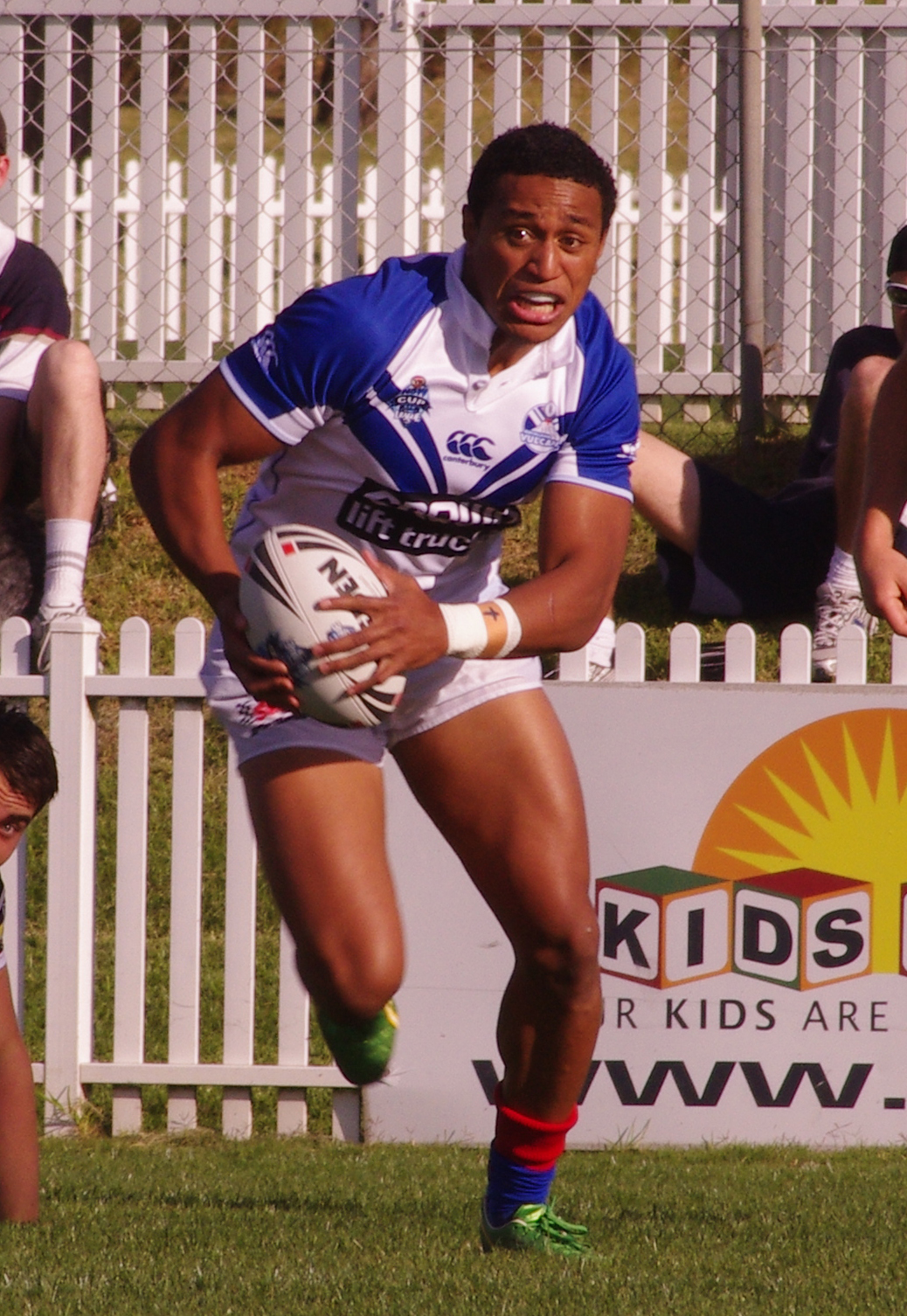
Fisiiahi playing for the Auckland Vulcans in 2012

=== 2012 ===
Fisiiahi played in 4 matches and scored a try for the Warriors in the 2012 NRL season. In an NSW cup match against the Western Suburbs Magpies, Fisiiahi scored an incredible 6 tries in the Auckland Vulcans 42–20 win.

=== 2013 ===
On 20 April 2013, Fisiiahi made his international debut, playing for Tonga in the 2013 Polynesian Cup against pacific rivals Samoa, playing at fullback in Tonga's 36–4 win at Penrith Stadium. After Round 19 against the Wests Tigers, Fisiiahi suffered a season ending torn pectoral muscle injury in the Warriors 24–14 win at Leichhardt Oval. Fisiiahi finished the Warriors 2013 NRL season with him playing in 11 matches and scoring 5 tries. Later in the year, Glen played for Tonga in their 2013 Rugby League World Cup campaign. Fisiiahi played in 2 of Tonga's 3 world cup matches. He scored his first international try against Scotland in Tonga's opening 26-24 match defeat. and scored another try in his second appearance, this time against pacific rivals Cook Islands in Tonga's 22–16 win.

=== 2014 ===
In February 2014, Fisiiahi was selected for the Warriors inaugural 2014 Auckland Nines squad. In Round 4 of the 2014 NRL season, Fisiiahi scored four tries against the Wests Tigers in the Warriors 42–18 victory at Westpac Stadium in Wellington. Fisiiahi's season was again ended early, this time suffering nerve damage to his shoulder (which necessitated a shoulder reconstruction) in Round 9 against the Cronulla-Sutherland Sharks at Remondis Stadium, in the Warriors 37–6 loss. Fisiiahi finished the Warriors 2014 NRL season with him playing in 5 matches and scoring 7 tries.

== Rugby union career ==
In 2016, Fisiiahi switched to rugby union, joining the Chiefs and Counties Manukau, joining another former NRL player, Sonny Bill Williams, at the Chiefs.
