= Nafe Seluini =

Tonga international rugby league footballer

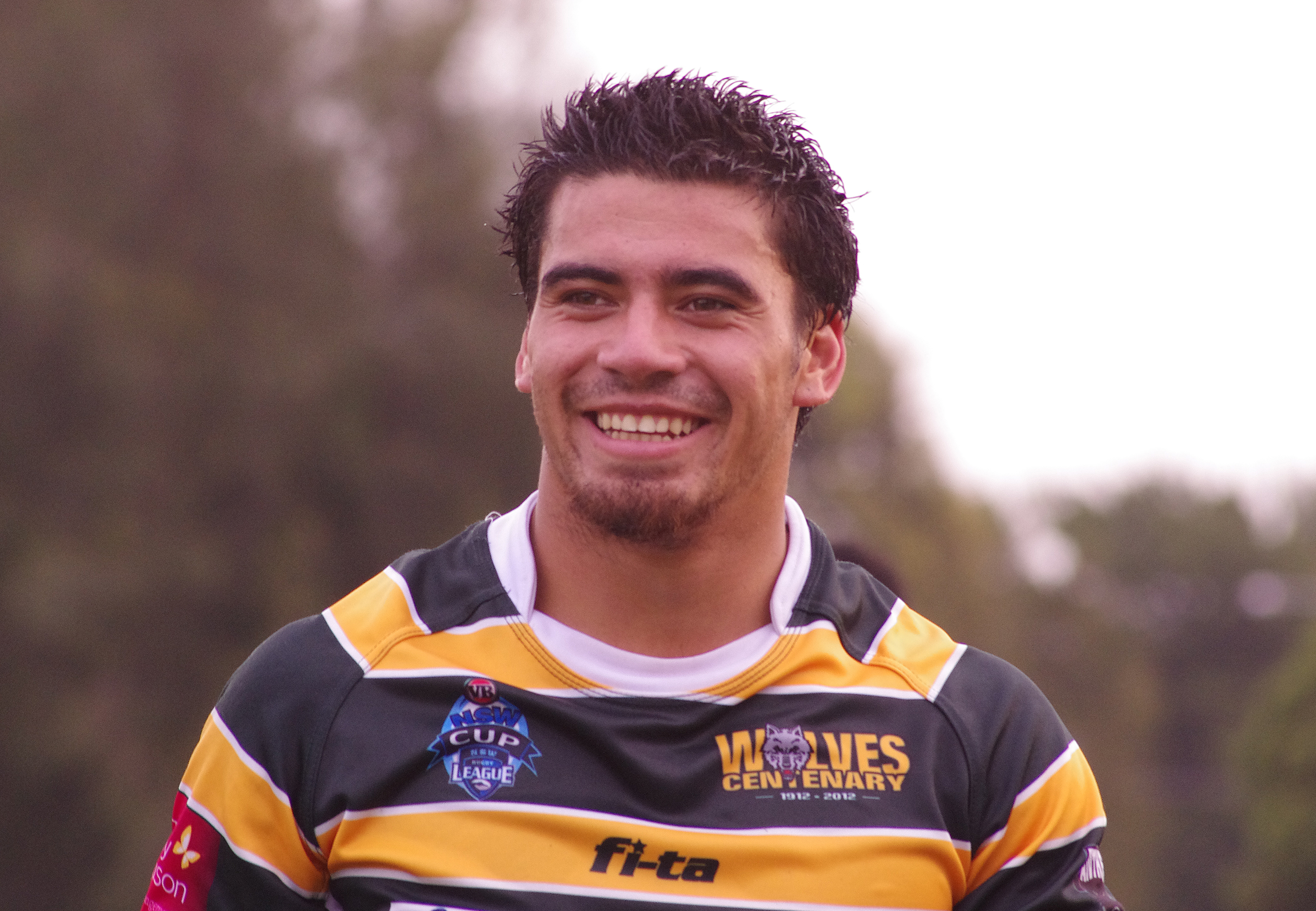

Personal information
- Full name: Nafetalai Seluini
- Born: 21 June 1990 (age 36) Auckland, New Zealand
- Height: 1.75 m (5 ft 9 in)
- Weight: 75 kg (11 st 11 lb)

Playing information
- Position: Hooker
Club
Years	Team	Pld	T	G	FG	P
2011–12	Penrith Panthers	19	1	0	0	4
2012–13	Sydney Roosters	8	0	0	0	0
	Total	27	1	0	0	4
Representative
Years	Team	Pld	T	G	FG	P
2009–16	Tonga	7	1	0	0	4
- Source: As of 11 February 2018

Nafe Seluini is a Tonga international rugby league footballer who plays as a hooker for the Sunshine Coast Falcons in the Intrust Super Cup. He previously played for the Penrith Panthers and the Sydney Roosters in the NRL.

== Playing career ==
A Mangere East Hawks junior in the Auckland Rugby League competition, Seluini began his career at the New Zealand Warriors, first playing in their Toyota Cup team in 2008. Seluini represented Tonga in a 2009 Test match against the New Zealand national rugby league team.

He was part of the Junior Warriors side that won the 2010 Toyota Cup Grand Final. He won the Warriors' 2010 NYC Player of the Year award and finished his career with fifty two Toyota Cup matches, twenty one tries and one goal.

In 2010 Seluini played for the Junior Kiwis before signing with the Penrith Panthers for the 2011 season.

Seluini made his first grade debut for the Penrith Panthers in Round 4 2011 against the Brisbane Broncos coming off the bench in the 18-10 loss. Seluini scored his first NRL try in round 8 against his former side the New Zealand Warriors.

In June 2012 Seluini made a mid-season switch, joining the Sydney Roosters on a one-and-a-half-year deal.

In October and November 2013, Seluini represented Tonga in the 2013 Rugby League World Cup.

In October 2015, Seluini played for Tonga in their Asia-Pacific Qualifier match against the Cook Islands for the 2017 Rugby League World Cup.

In 2016, Seluini signed with the Melbourne Storm. He played in the 2016 NRL Auckland Nines and also displayed skills for the feeder club Sunshine Coast Falcons. In May, he was part of the Tonga team that played against Samoa in the 2016 Polynesian Cup.
