= 2015 NRL Under-20s season =

2015 National Youth Competition
- Teams: 16
- Premiers: Penrith Panthers (1st title)

The 2015 NRL Under-20s season (known commercially as the 2015 Holden Cup) was the eighth season of the National Rugby League's Under-20s competition. The draw and structure of the competition mirrored that of the 2015 NRL Telstra Premiership season.

== Ladder ==
2015 NYC season
Pos	Team	Pld	W	D	L	B	PF	PA	PD	Pts
1	Penrith Panthers (P)	24	20	0	4	2	772	434	+338	44
2	North Queensland Cowboys	24	19	1	4	2	923	450	+473	43
3	Brisbane Broncos	24	17	1	6	2	833	570	+263	39
4	Manly Warringah Sea Eagles	24	13	3	8	2	696	568	+128	33
5	Wests Tigers	24	12	1	11	2	712	598	+114	29
6	Sydney Roosters	24	12	1	11	2	731	668	+63	29
7	New Zealand Warriors	24	11	2	11	2	654	562	+92	28
8	Canberra Raiders	24	12	0	12	2	646	811	-165	28
9	Melbourne Storm	24	10	1	13	2	588	743	-155	25
10	Canterbury-Bankstown Bulldogs	24	9	2	13	2	580	623	-43	24
11	Newcastle Knights	24	10	0	14	2	539	776	-237	24
12	Gold Coast Titans	24	9	0	15	2	596	687	-91	22
13	Parramatta Eels	24	8	2	14	2	541	752	-151	22
14	St George Illawarra Dragons	24	8	0	16	2	574	716	-142	20
15	Cronulla-Sutherland Sharks	24	7	2	15	2	481	762	-281	20
16	South Sydney Rabbitohs	24	6	2	16	2	528	674	-146	18

== Grand final ==
Sunday, 4 October

Penrith Panthers 2015 Penrith Panthers season	34 – 18	Manly Warringah Sea Eagles 2015 Manly Warringah Sea Eagles season

ANZ Stadium, Sydney

== Holden Cup Team of the Year ==
The 2015 NYC Team of the Year was announced on 14 September.

Position	Player	Club
FB	Tom Trbojevic	Manly-Warringah Sea Eagles
WG	Gideon Gela-Mosby	North Queensland Cowboys
CE	Jordan Drew	Brisbane Broncos
CE	Joseph Manu	Sydney Roosters
WG	Josh Addo-Carr	Cronulla-Sutherland Sharks
FE	Te Maire Martin	Wests Tigers
HB	Ashley Taylor	Brisbane Broncos
PR	Viliame Kikau	North Queensland Cowboys
HK	Jayden Berrell	Brisbane Broncos
PR	Joe Ofahengaue	Brisbane Broncos
SR	Coen Hess	North Queensland Cowboys
SR	Tevita Pangai Junior	Canberra Raiders
LK	Jai Arrow	Brisbane Broncos
Bench	Latrell Mitchell	Sydney Roosters
Bench	Brent Naden	Penrith Panthers
Bench	Jayden Nikorima	Brisbane Broncos
Bench	Danny Levi	Newcastle Knights
Coach	Cameron Ciraldo	Penrith Panthers
