= Paul Fisiiahi =

Tonga international rugby league footballer

Playing information
- Position: Centre
Representative
| Years | Team | Pld | T | G | FG | P |
|---|---|---|---|---|---|---|
| 2000 | Tonga | 1 | 1 | 0 | 0 | 4 |
- Source: RLP
- Relatives: David Fisiiahi (brother); Glen Fisiiahi (brother)

Paul Fisiiahi is a New Zealand rugby league footballer who represented Tonga at the 2000 World Cup and plays for the Howick Hornets. He is the identical twin of fellow Tongan International David.

== Playing career ==
In 2000 he joined the Eastern Tornadoes in the new Bartercard Cup competition.

By 2004 he was playing with the Otahuhu-Ellerslie Leopards, where he was selected to represent Auckland. In early 2004 he was bought in by Bob Bailey to play several matches for Moscow Dynamo in their Challenge Cup challenge.

He then moved to the Mount Albert Lions, where he scored a try in the 2005 Bartercard Cup Grand Final. He played for the Auckland Lions in the 2006 and 2007 Bartercard Cup. In 2011 he joined the Howick Hornets in the Auckland Rugby League championship. Selected for the Niue rugby league team 2009 alongside his brother David.

== Representative career ==
Fishiiahi represented both the New Zealand Residents and Tonga in 2000. He played one match for Tonga at the 2000 World Cup, coming off the bench and scoring a try.

In 2003 he toured England with New Zealand 'A'.
