= 2012 NRL Under-20s season =

- Teams: 16
- Premiers: Wests Tigers (1st title)
- Minor premiers: Canterbury Bulldogs (1st title)
- Matches played: 198
- Points scored: 10466
- Top points scorer(s): Manaia Rudolph 216
- Top try-scorer(s): Kieran Moss 21

The 2012 NRL Under-20s season was the fifth season of the National Rugby League's Under-20s competition. Known commercially as the 2012 Toyota Cup due to sponsorship from Toyota, the competition was solely for under-20 players. The draw and structure of the competition mirrored that of the NRL's 2012 Telstra Premiership season.

== Ladder ==
2012 National Youth Competition season
Pos.	Team	Pld	W	D	L	B	PF	PA	PD	Pts
1	Canterbury Bulldogs	24	17	1	6	2	774	517	+257	39
2	New Zealand Warriors	24	17	1	6	2	680	516	+164	39
3	Canberra Raiders	24	16	0	8	2	766	599	+167	36
4	Wests Tigers (P)	24	15	0	9	2	666	514	+152	34
5	Penrith Panthers	24	14	1	9	2	694	501	+193	33
6	South Sydney Rabbitohs	24	14	1	9	2	734	592	+142	33
7	Sydney Roosters	24	13	2	9	2	694	570	+124	32
8	St. George Illawarra Dragons	24	13	1	10	2	638	553	+85	31
9	Melbourne Storm	24	12	2	10	2	547	556	−9	30
10	Cronulla Sharks	24	11	2	11	2	619	684	−65	28
11	Newcastle Knights	24	10	1	13	2	646	574	+72	25
12	Brisbane Broncos	24	9	0	15	2	629	790	−161	22
13	North Queensland Cowboys	24	7	2	15	2	545	732	−187	20
14	Manly Sea Eagles	24	6	2	16	2	519	811	−292	18
15	Parramatta Eels	24	5	0	19	2	558	814	−256	14
16	Gold Coast Titans	24	5	0	19	2	424	810	−386	14

== Finals series ==
Qualifying and elimination finals
7 September, ANZ Stadium, Sydney
1	Canterbury	20
4	Wests Tigers	24
7 September, ANZ Stadium, Sydney
5	Penrith	20
8	St. George Illawarra	44
8 September, AAMI Park, Melbourne
6	South Sydney	22
7	Sydney	24
9 September, Canberra Stadium, Canberra
2	New Zealand	38
3	Canberra	39

Semi-finals
14 September, Aillanz Stadium Sydney
Canterbury	20
St. George Illawarra	46
15 September, ANZ Stadium, Sydney
New Zealand	10
Sydney	26

Preliminary finals
Wests Tigers	28
Sydney	22
Canberra	44
St. George Illawarra	26

Grand final
30 September, ANZ Stadium, Sydney
Wests Tigers	46
Canberra	6

== Player statistics ==
=== Leading try scorers ===
Top 10 try scorers
Pos	Name	Tries	Team
1	Kieren Moss	21	Penrith Panthers
2=	Kirisome Auva'a	20	Melbourne Storm
2=	Luke Keary	20	South Sydney Rabbitohs
2=	Chanel Mata'utia	20	Newcastle Knights
5=	Zac Santo	19	North Queensland Cowboys
5=	Charly Runciman	19	St. George Illawarra Dragons
5=	Caleb Timu	19	Brisbane Broncos
8=	Vaipuna Tia Kilifi	18	Penrith Panthers
8=	Jordan Tongahai	18	South Sydney Rabbitohs
10	Jon Sila	17	Canterbury Bulldogs

==== Most tries in a game ====
Top 5 most tries in a game
Pos	Name	Team	Opponent	Round	Tries
1	Gerard McCallum	Canterbury Bulldogs	Gold Coast Titans	5	5
2=	Kirisome Auva'a	Melbourne Storm	North Queensland Cowboys	19	4
2=	Zac Mackay	Penrith Panthers	Gold Coast Titans	25	4
2=	Ed Murphy	Canterbury Bulldogs	Gold Coast Titans	10	4
2=	Jon Sila	Canterbury Bulldogs	Manly Sea Eagles	8	4

=== Leading point scorers ===
Top 10 overall point scorers
Pos	Player	Team	T	G	FG	Points
1	Manaia Rudolph	Wests Tigers	13	82	-	216
2	Apisai Koroisau	South Sydney Rabbitohs	12	82	-	212
3=	Daniel Burke	St. George Illawarra Dragons	2	82	-	172
3=	Frederick Robinson	Canterbury Bulldogs	3	80	-	172
5	Mitch Cornish	Canberra Raiders	11	57	-	158
6	Jake Walsh	Cronulla Sharks	3	66	-	144
7	Mason Lino	New Zealand Warriors	3	63	-	138
8	Josh Drinkwater	Manly Sea Eagles	10	48	1	137
9	Anthony Milford	Canberra Raiders	12	39	1	127
10=	Harry Siejka	Penrith Panthers	6	51	-	126
10=	Will Smith	Newcastle Knights	10	43	-	126

==== Most points in a game ====
Top 5 most points in a game
Pos	Player	Team	Opponent	Round	T	G	FG	Points
1	Zac Mackay	Penrith Panthers	Gold Coast Titans	25	4	11	-	38
2	Kurt French	South Sydney Rabbitohs	Brisbane Broncos	4	3	9	-	30
3=	Mitch Cornish	Canberra Raiders	Cronulla Sharks	8	3	7	-	26
3=	Adam Quinlan	St. George Illawarra Dragons	Canterbury Bulldogs	SF	3	7	-	26
3=	Manaia Rudolph	Wests Tigers	New Zealand Warriors	11	3	7	-	26
3=	Patrick Templeman	Canterbury Bulldogs	Canberra Raiders	25	3	7	-	26

=== Leading goal scorers ===
Top 10 goal scorers
Pos	Player	Goals	Team
1=	Daniel Burke	82	St. George Illawarra Dragons
1=	Apisai Koroisau	82	South Sydney Rabbitohs
1=	Manaia Rudolph	82	Wests Tigers
4	Frederick Robinson	80	Canterbury Bulldogs
5	Jake Walsh	66	Cronulla Sharks
6	Mason Lino	63	New Zealand Warriors
7	Mitch Cornish	57	Canberra Raiders
8	Harry Siejka	51	Penrith Panthers
9	Josh Drinkwater	48	Manly Sea Eagles
10=	Sam Foster	47	North Queensland Cowboys

==== Most goals in a game ====
Top 5 most goals in a game
Pos	Player	Team	Opponent	Round	Goals
1=	Zac Mackay	Penrith Panthers	Gold Coast Titans	25	11
1=	Jake Walsh	Cronulla Sharks	Manly Sea Eagles	3	11
3=	Mitch Cornish	Canberra Raiders	Parramatta Eels	10	9
3=	Kurt French	South Sydney Rabbitohs	Brisbane Broncos	4	9
3=	Frederick Robinson	Canterbury Bulldogs	Parramatta Eels	9	9

=== Leading field goal scorers ===
Top 10 field goal scorers
Pos	Player	Team	FG
1=	Jamal Fogerty	Gold Coast Titans	2
1=	Jacob Miller	Wests Tigers	2
3=	Chris Binge	Brisbane Broncos	1
3=	Tim Dengate	Penrith Panthers	1
3=	Josh Drinkwater	Manly Sea Eagles	1
3=	Sam Foster	North Queensland Cowboys	1
3=	Chris Knight	Penrith Panthers	1
3=	Penani Manumalealii	Cronulla Sharks	1
3=	Matt McGahan	Melbourne Storm	1
3=	Anthony Milford	Canberra Raiders	1

== Club statistics ==
=== Biggest Wins ===
Top 10 biggest winning margins
Pos	Winning Team	Losing Team	Round	Score	Margin
1	Penrith Panthers	Gold Coast Titans	25	78–0	78
2	Cronulla Sharks	Manly Sea Eagles	3	78–10	68
3	South Sydney Rabbitohs	Parramatta Eels	25	54–6	48
4	Canterbury Bulldogs	Gold Coast Titans	10	52–6	46
5	Penrith Panthers	Manly Sea Eagles	6	44–0	44
6=	Canberra Raiders	Cronulla Sharks	8	54–12	42
6=	Melbourne Storm	Brisbane Broncos	24	60–18	42
6=	South Sydney Rabbitohs	Gold Coast Titans	22	48–6	42
6=	Wests Tigers	New Zealand Warriors	11	54–12	42
10=	Canterbury Bulldogs	Gold Coast Titans	5	60–20	40
10=	Newcastle Knights	Cronulla Sharks	2	40–0	40
10=	Penrith Panthers	Gold Coast Titans	15	52–12	40
10=	Wests Tigers	Canberra Raiders	GF	46–6	40

=== Winning Streaks ===
Winning streak still active

Top 5 longest winning streaks
Pos	Team	First Win	Round	Last Win	Round	Wins
1	Canberra Raiders	42–18 vs North Queensland Cowboys	5	36–24 vs South Sydney Rabbitohs	12	7
2=	New Zealand Warriors	24–18 vs Cronulla Sharks	15	42–22 vs Manly Sea Eagles	21	6
2=	Penrith Panthers	20–18 vs St. George Illawarra Dragons	10	24–12 vs Parramatta Eels	16	6
2=	Canterbury Bulldogs	38–26 vs Newcastle Knights	22	36–28 vs Sydney Roosters	26	5
4=	St. George Illawarra Dragons	32–30 vs Canberra Raiders	17	28–26 vs Sydney Roosters	22	5

- QF = Qualifying Finals
- SF = Semi-finals
- PF = Preliminary Finals
- GF = Grand Final

=== Losing Streaks ===
Losing streak still active

Top 5 longest losing streaks
Pos	Team	First Loss	Round	Last Loss	Round	Losses
1	Parramatta Eels	22–24 vs Manly Sea Eagles	18	Current Streak	-	9
2	Newcastle Knights	20–28 vs Canberra Raiders	14	26–38 vs Canterbury Bulldogs	23	8
3=	Gold Coast Titans	26–34 vs North Queensland Cowboys	1	24–28 vs Manly Sea Eagles	7	7
3=	North Queensland Cowboys	20–26 vs Brisbane Broncos	2	14–36 vs South Sydney Rabbitohs	8	7
3=	Parramatta Eels	22–58 vs Canterbury Bulldogs	9	12–24 vs Penrith Panthers	16	7

- QF = Qualifying Finals
- SF = Semi-finals
- PF = Preliminary Finals
- GF = Grand Final
