= 2010 NRL Under-20s season =

- Teams: 16
- Premiers: New Zealand (1st title)
- Minor premiers: South Sydney (1st title)
- Matches played: 201
- Points scored: 10734
- Wooden spoon: Parramatta (1st spoon)
- Player of the Year: Tariq Sims
- Top point-scorer: Aiden Sezer (281)
- Top try-scorer: Drury Low (22)

The 2010 NRL Under-20s season was the third season of the National Rugby League's Under 20s competition and was known commercially as the 2010 Toyota Cup due to sponsorship by Toyota. Solely for players under 20 years of age, the draw and structure of the competition mirrored that of the 2010 NRL Telstra Premiership season.

== Ladder ==
- Teams highlighted in green indicates that they have qualified for the top 8 playoffs.

National Youth Competition season 2010
	Team	Pld	W	D	L	B	PF	PA	PD	Pts
1	South Sydney Rabbitohs	24	17	0	7	2	687	567	+120	38
2	New Zealand Warriors (P)	24	16	1	7	2	731	481	+250	37
3	Canterbury-Bankstown Bulldogs	24	15	2	7	2	773	596	+177	36
4	North Queensland Cowboys	24	14	3	7	2	673	540	+133	35
5	Sydney Roosters	24	14	1	9	2	695	588	+107	33
6	Canberra Raiders	24	14	1	9	2	764	734	+30	33
7	Manly Warringah Sea Eagles	24	13	0	11	2	568	583	-15	30
8	Gold Coast Titans	24	12	1	11	2	581	663	-82	29
9	Wests Tigers	24	12	0	12	2	620	532	+88	28
10	Brisbane Broncos	24	11	1	12	2	690	635	+55	27
11	St. George Illawarra Dragons	24	10	1	13	2	568	543	+25	25
12	Newcastle Knights	24	9	1	14	2	612	732	-120	23
13	Melbourne Storm	24	8	2	14	2	683	782	-99	22
14	Cronulla-Sutherland Sharks	24	8	1	15	2	492	634	-142	21
15	Penrith Panthers	24	8	0	16	2	643	838	-195	20
16	Parramatta Eels	24	3	1	20	2	454	786	-332	11

== Finals series ==
Qualifying finals
1	South Sydney	24
8	Gold Coast	22
2	New Zealand	25
7	Manly Warringah	22
3	Canterbury	54
6	Canberra	18
4	North Queensland	46
5	Sydney	12

Semifinals
4W	North Queensland	18
2L	Canberra	22
3W	Canterbury	24
1L	Sydney	22

Preliminary finals
1W	South Sydney	64
Canberra	18
2W	New Zealand	23
Canterbury	16

Final
South Sydney	28
New Zealand	42

Home	Score	Away	Match Information
Home	Score	Away	Date and Time	Venue	Referee
Qualifying Finals
Gold Coast Titans	22 - 24	South Sydney Rabbitohs	10 September 2010, 5:30pm	Skilled Park	Chris Butler
North Queensland Cowboys	46 - 12	Sydney Roosters	11 September 2010, 4:15pm	Sydney Football Stadium	Gavin Reynolds
Canterbury Bulldogs	54 - 18	Canberra Raiders	11 September 2010, 6:15pm	CUA Stadium	Adam Devcich
New Zealand Warriors	25 - 22	Manly-Warringah Sea Eagles	12 September 2010, 1:45pm	WIN Jubilee Oval	Gavin Morris
Semi-finals
North Queensland Cowboys	18 - 22	Canberra Raiders	17 September 2010, 5:15pm	Canberra Stadium	Gavin Reynolds
Canterbury Bulldogs	24 - 22	Sydney Roosters	18 September 2010, 5:15pm	Sydney Football Stadium	Adam Devcich
Preliminary Finals
New Zealand Warriors	23 - 16	Canterbury Bulldogs	24 September 2010, 5:15pm	Suncorp Stadium	Gavin Reynolds
South Sydney Rabbitohs	64 - 18	Canberra Raiders	25 September 2010, 5:15pm	ANZ Stadium	Gavin Morris
Grand Final
South Sydney Rabbitohs	28 - 42	New Zealand Warriors	3 October 2010, 2:15pm	ANZ Stadium	Gavin Reynolds

=== Grand final ===
South Sydney Rabbitohs	Position	New Zealand Warriors
Malcolm Webster	FB	Glen Fisiiahi
James Roberts	WG	Omar Slaimankhel
Taioalo Vaivai	CE	Sosaia Feki
Kane Morgan	CE	Siuatonga Likiliki
Josh Mansour	WG	Elijah Niko
Matt Mundine	FE	Carlos Tuimavave
Adam Reynolds	HB	Shaun Johnson
Josh Starling	PR	Neccrom Areaiiti
Nathan Peats (c)	HK	Henry Chan Ting
Francis Laulu	PR	Mark Ioane
Adrian Haangana	SR	Elijah Taylor (c)
Joseph So'oalo	SR	Matthew Robinson
Blake Judd	LK	Sebastine Ikahihifo
Jake Shearer	Bench	Nafetalai Seluini
Jacob Nansen	Bench	Charlie Gubb
Jack Tulemau	Bench	Sam Lousi
Brendan McKinnon	Bench	Daniel Palavi
David Kidwell	Coach	John Ackland

Three second-half tries in 10 minutes helped the Warriors run all over the Rabbits in Sydney.

After holding a slender 12–10 lead at the break, the Warriors turned on the after-burners with halfback Shaun Johnson leading the charge through an impressive kicking and running display.

Though for the first seven minutes after kick off it was a different story, with Souths’ halfback Adam Reynolds getting an early 40/20 and showing his chipping and kicking skills to force the Warriors to line drop out early.

But, despite the early pressure from the Rabbitohs, the Warriors taught them a lesson on how to turn pressure into points and they did so with their first foray into opposition territory.

A Shaun Johnson in-goal grubber was unable to be controlled by South's fullback Malcolm Webster and Elijah Taylor was first on the scene to slap a hand on it. Johnson converted for the Warriors to lead 6–0.

Within seconds, Shaun Johnson was the architect of the Warriors second try, running the ball and offloading with an over-the-top pass for Siuatonga Likiliki to get his 19th try of the season. Johnson converted off the post from wide out for a 12–0 lead.

The Rabbitohs had their chances, held up within the first few minutes of the match and going close but for a knock on in the 20th minute, but struggled to adapt with the big warriors pack able to get 60 metres each set, skillfully followed up by the excellent kicking games of Shaun Johnson and five-eight Carlos Tuimavave.

But the big pack and wide men were caught out in the 27th minute. Souths had a scrum 70 metres out and Reynolds let loose with a kick for his speedsters to chase. Souths 17-year-old flyer James Roberts left all in his dust, nudged it over the line with his foot and fell on the pill. Reynolds converted for 12–6.

The Warriors suddenly looked rattled, kicking out on the full to hand over possession and Souths rubbed salt in a wound when Matt Mundine gave Taioalo Vaivai the space needed to stretch out and score. The conversion missed and the Warriors had a two-point lead, 12–10.

Ten minutes into the second half the Warriors took advantage of a weak Rabbitoh's blindside defence. A Shaun Johnson grubber ended up under the hand of Elijah Taylor for the stand-in captain to score his second try and the kick taking his side out to 18–10.

Two minutes later, Siuatonga Likiliki showed his class to bump off six would-be tacklers, offload to fullback Glen Fisiiahi who stepped inside to score. Johnson kept his perfect record intact and converted again for 24–10.

Then the floodgates opened – if they hadn't already.

Shaun Johnson, the classiest on the park along with Jack Gibson medal winner, Carlos Tuimavave, chipped and regathered then flung the ball out from underneath him to the man-mountain that is Sam Lousi to score. Johnson converted for a 30–10 score line.

Then it was the turn of "The Junior Beast", Elijah Niko, to force his way across the line and Johnson highlighted the total control by once again adding the extras, 36–10.

The Warriors eased, and Rabbitohs' lock Blake Judd and captain Nathan Peats managed to grab two late tries to make the score respectable at 36–22.

But the Warriors were not done, Nafe Seluini accelerating away to slide under the posts. Johnson added his seventh conversion from as many attempts for 42–22.

The match was well over when big Jack Tulemau added a consolation try in the final minutes for Souths.

New Zealand Warriors 42 (Elijah Taylor 2, Siuatonga Likiliki, Glen Fisiiahi, Sam Lousi, Elijah Niko, Nafetalai Seluini tries; Shaun Johnson 7/7 goals)

South Sydney Rabbitohs 28 (James Roberts, Taioalo Vaivai, Blake Judd, Nathan Peats, Jack Tulemau tries; Adam Reynolds 4/5 goals)

Half-Time: New Zealand 12-10

Jack Gibson Medal: Carlos Tuimavave

== Player statistics ==
=== Leading try scorers ===
Top 10 try scorers
Pos	Name	Tries	Team
1	Drury Low	22	Canberra
2=	Glen Fisiiahi	20	New Zealand
2=	Mark Kheirallah	20	Sydney
2=	Siuatonga Likiliki	20	New Zealand
5	Taioalo Vaivai	19	South Sydney
6=	Ryan Tongia	18	Gold Coast
6=	Wayne Ulugia	18	North Queensland
8=	Kalifa Fai-Fai Loa	17	St. George Illawarra
8=	Nathan Massey	17	Canterbury
10=	Nehe Millner-Skudder	16	Canterbury
10=	Hayden Hodge	16	Canberra
10=	James Segeyaro	16	North Queensland
12=	Ray Perenara	14	Gold Coast

==== Most tries in a game ====
Top 5 most tries in a game
	Player	Team	Opponent	Round	Tries
1=	Dale Copley	Brisbane	Sydney	4	4
1=	Nathan Gardner	Cronulla	South Sydney	3	4
1=	Mark Kheirallah	Sydney	Melbourne	14	4
1=	James Roberts	South Sydney	Canberra	PF	4
1=	Omar Slaimankhel	New Zealand	Manly-Warringah	24	4
1=	Ryan Tongia	Gold Coast	Manly-Warringah	14	4
1=	Taioalo Vaivai	South Sydney	Canterbury	4	4

=== Leading point scorers ===
Top 10 overall point scorers
	Player	Team	T	G	FG	Pts
1	Aiden Sezer	Canterbury	12	120	1	289
2	Adam Reynolds	South Sydney	13	108	-	268
3	Chris Medcalf	Canberra	11	107	-	258
4	Kyle Feldt	North Queensland	15	86	-	232
5	Brad Murray	Sydney	3	102	3	219
6	Josh Jerome	Melbourne	9	72	-	180
7	Dane Gagai	Brisbane	13	63	-	178
8	Jordan Rankin	Gold Coast	6	74	1	173
9	Shaun Johnson	New Zealand	7	69	5	171
10	Jake Mullaney	Wests Tigers	13	50	-	152

==== Most points in a game ====
Top 5 most points in a game
	Player	Team	Opponent	Round	Tries	Goals	Points
1=	Adam Reynolds	South Sydney	Canberra	PF	1	10	24
1=	Aiden Sezer	Canterbury	Penrith	11	3	6	24
1=	Aiden Sezer	Canterbury	Canberra	23	2	8	24
4=	Dane Gagai	Brisbane	Parramatta	23	2	7	22
4=	Beau Henry	St. George Illawarra	Melbourne	4	2	7	22
4=	Jake Mullaney	Wests Tigers	Canberra	4	3	5	22
4=	Jake Mullaney	Wests Tigers	Penrith	7	2	7	22
4=	Brad Murray	Sydney	St. George Illawarra	7	1	9	22

=== Leading goal scorers ===
Top 10 goal scorers
Pos	Name	Goals	Team
1	Aiden Sezer	120	Canterbury
2	Adam Reynolds	108	South Sydney
3	Chris Medcalf	107	Canberra
4	Brad Murray	102	Sydney
5	Kyle Feldt	86	North Queensland
6	Jordan Rankin	74	Gold Coast
7	Josh Jerome	72	Melbourne
8	Shaun Johnson	69	New Zealand
9	Dane Gagai	63	Brisbane
10	Chad Townsend	55	Cronulla

==== Most goals in a game ====
Top 5 most goals in a game
	Player	Team	Opponent	Round	Goals
1=	Brad Murray	Sydney	Melbourne	14	10
1=	Adam Reynolds	South Sydney	Canberra	PF	10
3	Brad Murray	Sydney	St. George Illawarra	7	9
4=	Dave Farkas	Penrith	Newcastle	13	8
4=	Jake Mullaney	Wests Tigers	Parramatta	3	8
4=	Jordan Rankin	Gold Coast	Canberra	13	8
4=	Adam Reynolds	South Sydney	Melbourne	16	8
4=	Aiden Sezer	Canterbury	Canberra	23	8
4=	Aiden Sezer	Canterbury	Penrith	25	8

=== Leading field goal scorers ===
Top 10 field goal scorers
Pos	Name	Team	Field goals
1	Shaun Johnson	New Zealand	5
2=	Matt Mundine	South Sydney	3
2=	Brad Murray	Sydney	3
4=	Sam Williams	Canberra	2
4=	Chad Townsend	Cronulla	2

== Club statistics ==
=== Biggest Wins ===
Top 10 biggest winning margins
Pos	Winning team	Losing team	Round	Score	Margin
1	Melbourne	Newcastle	2	62-10	52
2=	Canterbury	Canberra	23	60-12	48
2=	Sydney	Melbourne	14	60-12	48
4=	Gold Coast	Parramatta	22	46-0	46
4=	New Zealand	Penrith	6	56-10	46
4=	New Zealand	Parramatta	26	52-6	46
4=	South Sydney	Canberra	PF	64-18	46
8	Manly-Warringah	Gold Coast	7	50-6	44
9=	Canterbury	North Queensland	24	50-10	40
9=	North Queensland	Gold Coast	4	48-8	40

=== Winning Streaks ===
Winning streak still active

Top 5 longest winning streaks
Pos	Team	First win	Round	Last win	Round	Games won
1=	New Zealand	28-26 vs Newcastle	23	Current Streak	-	7
1=	South Sydney	16-14 vs Wests Tigers	22	64-18 vs Canberra	PF	7
1=	Wests Tigers	56-24 vs Parramatta	3	24-13 vs South Sydney	10	7
4=	Canterbury	30-26 vs Manly-Warringah	16	25-12 vs South Sydney	21	6
4=	Canterbury	60-18 vs Canberra	23	24-22 vs Sydney	SF	6
4=	Gold Coast	52-24 vs Canberra	13	36-30 vs Brisbane	19	6
4=	New Zealand	18-10 vs Sydney	16	30-14 vs Gold Coast	21	6

- QF = Qualifying Finals
- SF = Semi-finals
- PF = Preliminary Finals
- GF = Grand Final

=== Losing Streaks ===
Losing streak still active

Top 5 longest losing streaks
Pos	Team	First Loss	Round	Last Loss	Round	Games lost
1	Parramatta	16-32 vs Manly-Warringah	2	20-34 vs Newcastle	15	12
2	Penrith	10-38 vs New Zealand	18	40-48 vs Canterbury	25	8
3=	Brisbane	28-36 vs South Sydney	14	22-36 vs Sydney	20	7
3=	Parramatta	28-30 vs Canterbury	20	Current Streak	-	7
5=	Melbourne	18-42 vs Manly-Warringah	6	16-46 vs Canterbury	12	6
5=	Penrith	5-38 vs North Queensland	2	16-42 vs Wests Tigers	7	6

- QF = Qualifying Finals
- SF = Semi-finals
- PF = Preliminary Finals
- GF = Grand Final

2010 in rugby league

== Awards ==
=== Player of the Year ===
The winner of the award is decided by the most votes during the year as decided by the referee of each game on a 3-2-1 basis for each game played throughout the regular season.

Winner:

Tariq Sims, Brisbane

=== Team Of The Year ===
Voted on by the 16 Toyota Cup coaches, with the players with the highest votes in each position selected.

2010 Team Of The Year
Position	Name	Team
FB	Dane Gagai	Brisbane
WG	Kalifa Fai-Fai Loa	St. George Illawarra
CT	Dylan Farrell	South Sydney
CT	Siuatonga Likiliki	New Zealand
WG	Josh Mansour	South Sydney
FE	Aiden Sezer	Canterbury
HB	Sam Williams	Canberra
FR	Tariq Sims	Brisbane
HK	James Segeyaro	North Queensland
FR	Andrew Clayton	Brisbane
SR	Ryan James	Gold Coast
SR	Sam Mataora	Canberra
LK	Ethan Cook	Newcastle
Int	Brad Murray	Sydney
Int	Dale Finucane	Canterbury
Int	Matt Hyland	Wests Tigers
Int	Lama Tasi	Manly-Warringah
Coach	Andrew Patmore	Canterbury
