= David Fisiiahi =

Tonga international rugby league footballer

Playing information
- Position: Centre
Representative
Years	Team	Pld	T	G	FG	P
2000	Tonga	3	1	0	0	4
- Source: RLP
- Relatives: Glen Fisiiahi (brother); Paul Fisiiahi (brother)

David Fisiiahi is a New Zealand rugby league footballer who represented Tonga at the 2000 World Cup and currently plays for the Ellerslie Eagles. He is the identical twin of fellow Tongan International Paul.

== Playing career ==
In 2000 he joined the Eastern Tornadoes in the new Bartercard Cup competition.

By 2004 he was playing with the Otahuhu-Ellerslie Leopards.

He played for the Auckland Lions in the 2007 Bartercard Cup, scoring a try in the final. He also played matches for the Lions in the NSWRL Premiership, debuting on 25 March.

Fisiiahi currently plays for the Ellerslie Eagles in the Auckland Rugby League competition.

== Representative career ==
Fisiiahi represented both the New Zealand Residents and Tonga in 2000. He represented Tonga at the 2000 World Cup, playing in three matches. Also was selected for Niue for pacific games 2009 as he is part Niuean.
