= 2017 NRL Under-20s season =

- Teams: 16

The 2017 NRL Under-20s season (known commercially as the 2017 Holden Cup due to sponsorship from Holden) was the tenth and final season of the National Rugby League's Under-20s competition.

The competition will start on 2 March. The finals will begin on 8 September and conclude with the final ever match of the competition, the Grand Final, which will be held on 1 October at ANZ Stadium. The Sydney Roosters are the defending champions.

The draw and structure of the competition largely mirror that of its first grade counterpart, the 2017 Telstra Premiership. However, the Melbourne Storm will play 10 of their 12 home fixtures at Sunshine Coast Stadium. Other matches will also be played at non-NRL venues, including Langlands Park, Belmore Sports Ground, Redfern Oval, Ringrose Park, Cudgen Leagues, Morry Breen Oval and Central Coast Stadium.

In 2018, the competition will be replaced by two competitions, one based in Queensland and one based in New South Wales.

== Regular season ==
Team	1	2	3	4	5	6	7	8	9	10	11	12	13	14	15	16	17	18	19	20	21	22	23	24	25	26	F1	F2	F3	GF
Brisbane Broncos	**CRO**; **2**	NQL; 2	**MEL**; **4**	CAN; 8	**CBY**; **14**	SYD; 14	GCT; 4	**SOU**; **18**	PEN; 32	MAN; 36	WTI; 10	**NZL**; **16**	**SYD**; **8**	SOU; 6	X	**CAN**; **14**	MEL; 30	X	**NEW**; **28**	CBY; 34	**PAR**; **8**	**GCT**; **2**	CRO; 28	SGI; 34	PAR; 6	**NQL**; **2**	NEW; 4	**PEN**; **21**		
Canberra Raiders	**NQL**; **16**	CRO; 62	WTI; 44	**BRI**; **8**	PAR; 20	**GCT**; **8**	NZL; 2	MAN; 22	**CBY**; **4**	**NEW**; **16**	**PAR**; **1**	SYD; 8	**MAN**; **16**	**PEN**; **6**	X	BRI; 14	NQL; 22	X	SGI; 6	MEL; 12	**SOU**; **30**	**CRO**; **36**	**NZL**; **22**	PEN; 20	NEW; 1	**MEL**; **2**				
Canterbury-Bankstown Bulldogs	MEL; 6	**SYD**; **22**	**NZL**; **2**	**MAN**; **8**	BRI; 14	**NEW**; **10**	SOU; 6	WTI; 0	CAN; 4	NQL; 6	SYD; 30	**CRO**; **20**	PEN; 16	SGI; 2	X	**NZL**; **30**	PAR; 8	NEW; 0	X	**BRI**; **34**	**PEN**; **18**	PAR; 22	SOU; 4	MAN; 30	**GCT**; **8**	SGI; 0				
Cronulla-Sutherland Sharks	BRI; 2	**CAN**; **62**	SGI; 34	**PAR**; **10**	NEW; 10	**MEL**; **14**	**PEN**; **0**	GCT; 36	**WTI**; **16**	**SGI**; **22**	NQL; 16	CBY; 20	X	MEL; 8	WTI; 78	MAN; 4	**SYD**; **14**	X	**GCT**; **20**	SOU; 26	**NZL**; **38**	CAN; 36	**BRI**; **28**	**NQL**; **24**	SYD; 8	**NEW**; **12**	PAR; 13	MAN; 22		
Gold Coast Titans	SYD; 14	**NEW**; **4**	PAR; 8	NQL; 4	**NZL**; **4**	CAN; 8	**BRI**; **4**	**CRO**; **36**	NEW; 28	MEL; 12	MAN; 24	X	**NQL**; **18**	NZL; 2	**SOU**; **8**	**WTI**; **14**	SGI; 12	X	CRO; 20	**PEN**; **20**	WTI; 0	BRI; 2	**SGI**; **24**	**PAR**; **22**	CBY; 8	**SYD**; **36**				
Manly-Warringah Sea Eagles	PAR; 18	SOU; 32	**NQL**; **8**	CBY; 8	**SYD**; **52**	SGI; 6	MEL; 10	**CAN**; **22**	**SOU**; **18**	**BRI**; **36**	**GCT**; **24**	X	CAN; 16	NEW; 20	X	**CRO**; **4**	NZL; 46	**PEN**; **8**	WTI; 10	**SGI**; **24**	**MEL**; **8**	SYD; 6	**WTI**; **6**	**CBY**; **30**	**NZL**; **40**	PEN; 19	**NQL**; **14**	**CRO**; **22**	**SGI**; **16**	**PAR**; **2**
Melbourne Storm	**CBY**; **6**	**NZL**; **8**	BRI; 4	**WTI**; **38**	PEN; 16	CRO; 14	**MAN**; **10**	NZL; 16	**SGI**; **22**	**GCT**; **12**	**SOU**; **26**	X	NEW; 7	**CRO**; **8**	NQL; 2	**SYD**; **1**	**BRI**; **30**	PAR; 32	X	**CAN**; **12**	MAN; 8	**NQL**; **44**	SYD; 26	**NEW**; **36**	SOU; 34	CAN; 2				
Newcastle Knights	**NZL**; **38**	GCT; 4	SOU; 4	**PEN**; **24**	**CRO**; **10**	CBY; 10	SYD; 2	**NQL**; **42**	**GCT**; **28**	CAN; 26	PEN; 6	X	**MEL**; **7**	**MAN**; **20**	X	**SGI**; **5**	WTI; 10	**CBY**; **0**	BRI; 28	**SYD**; **22**	SGI; 8	NZL; 66	**PAR**; **38**	MEL; 36	**CAN**; **1**	CRO; 12	**BRI**; **4**			
New Zealand Warriors	NEW; 38	MEL; 8	CBY; 2	**SGI**; **24**	GCT; 4	PAR; 10	**CAN**; **2**	**MEL**; **16**	SYD; 8	**PEN**; **22**	SGI; 2	BRI; 16	**PAR**; **16**	**GCT**; **2**	X	CBY; 30	**MAN**; **46**	X	PEN; 22	**NQL**; **60**	CRO; 38	**NEW**; **66**	CAN; 22	**SOU**; **58**	MAN; 40	**WST**; **38**				
North Queensland Cowboys	CAN; 16	**BRI**; **2**	MAN; 8	**GCT**; **4**	SOU; 24	WTI; 6	**SGI**; **34**	NEW; 42	PAR; 48	**CBY**; **6**	**CRO**; **16**	X	GCT; 18	PAR; 36	**MEL**; **2**	PEN; 6	**CAN**; **22**	X	SOU; 14	NZL; 60	**SYD**; **4**	MEL; 44	**PEN**; **24**	CRO; 24	**WST**; **8**	BRI; 2	MAN; 14			
Parramatta Eels	**MAN**; **18**	**SGI**; **4**	**GCT**; **8**	CRO; 10	**CAN**; **20**	**NZL**; **10**	**WTI**; **32**	PEN; 4	**NQL**; **48**	**SYD**; **2**	CAN; 1	**SOU**; **2**	NZL; 16	**NQL**; **36**	SGI; 2	X	**CBY**; **8**	**MEL**; **32**	X	**WTI**; **4**	BRI; 8	**CBY**; **22**	NEW; 38	GCT; 22	**BRI**; **6**	**SOU**; **14**	**CRO**; **13**	X	PEN; 22	MAN; 2
Penrith Panthers	**SGI**; **2**	**WTI**; **32**	SYD; 26	NEW; 24	**MEL**; **16**	SOU; 4	CRO; 0	**PAR**; **4**	**BRI**; **32**	NZL; 22	**NEW**; **6**	X	**CBY**; **16**	CAN; 6	X	**NQL**; **6**	**SOU**; **0**	MAN; 8	**NZL**; **24**	GCT; 20	CBY; 18	WTI; 26	NQL; 24	**CAN**; **20**	SGI; 30	**MAN**; **19**	SGI; 4	BRI; 21	**PAR**; **22**	
South Sydney Rabbitohs	WTI; 2	**MAN**; **32**	**NEW**; **4**	SYD; 32	**NQL**; **24**	**PEN**; **4**	**CBY**; **6**	BRI; 18	MAN; 18	WTI; 18	MEL; 26	PAR; 2	X	**BRI**; **6**	GCT; 8	X	PEN; 0	**SYD**; **0**	**NQL**; **14**	**CRO**; **26**	CAN; 30	**SGI**; **22**	**CBY**; **4**	NZL; 58	**MEL**; **34**	PAR; 14				
St. George Illawarra Dragons	PEN; 2	PAR; 4	**CRO**; **34**	NZL; 24	**WTI**; **8**	**MAN**; **6**	NQL; 34	**SYD**; **9**	MEL; 22	CRO; 22	**NZL**; **2**	X	**WTI**; **38**	**CBY**; **2**	**PAR**; **2**	NEW; 5	**GCT**; **2**	X	**CAN**; **6**	MAN; 24	**NEW**; **8**	SOU; 22	GCT; 24	**BRI**; **34**	**PEN**; **30**	CBY; 0	**PEN**; **4**	X	MAN; 16	
Sydney Roosters	**GCT**; **14**	CBY; 22	**PEN**; **26**	**SOU**; **32**	MAN; 52	**BRI**; **14**	**NEW**; **2**	SGI; 9	**NZL**; **8**	PAR; 2	**CBY**; **30**	**CAN**; **8**	BRI; 8	**WTI**; **14**	X	MEL; 1	CRO; 14	SOU; 0	X	NEW; 22	NQL; 4	**MAN**; **6**	**MEL**; **26**	WTI; 42	**CRO**; **8**	GCT; 36				
Wests Tigers	**SOU**; **2**	PEN; 32	**CAN**; **44**	MEL; 38	SGI; 8	**NQL**; **6**	PAR; 32	**CBY**; **0**	CRO; 16	**SOU**; **18**	**BRI**; **10**	X	SGI; 38	SYD; 14	**CRO**; **78**	GCT; 14	**NEW**; **10**	X	**MAN**; **10**	PAR; 4	**GCT**; **0**	**PEN**; **26**	MAN; 6	**SYD**; **42**	NQL; 8	NZL; 38				
Team	1	2	3	4	5	6	7	8	9	10	11	12	13	14	15	16	17	18	19	20	21	22	23	24	25	26	F1	F2	F3	GF

Bold – Opposition's Home game
X – Bye
* – Golden point game
Opponent for round listed above margin

== Ladder ==
2017 NRL Under-20s season
Pos	Team	Pld	W	D	L	B	PF	PA	PD	Pts
1	Cronulla-Sutherland Sharks	24	19	1	4	2	920	446	+474	43
2	Penrith Panthers	24	15	2	7	2	711	518	+193	36
3	St. George Illawarra Dragons	24	15	1	8	2	660	620	+40	35
4	Parramatta Eels	24	15	0	9	2	713	546	+167	34
5	North Queensland Cowboys	24	14	0	10	2	718	536	+182	32
6	Brisbane Broncos	24	14	0	10	2	640	572	+68	32
7	Newcastle Knights	24	13	1	10	2	650	661	-11	31
8	Manly-Warringah Sea Eagles	24	13	0	11	2	736	623	+113	30
9	South Sydney Rabbitohs	24	12	2	10	2	692	586	+106	30
10	Sydney Roosters	24	12	1	11	2	782	622	+160	29
11	Gold Coast Titans	24	10	1	13	2	638	768	-130	25
12	Canberra Raiders	24	10	0	14	2	584	688	-104	24
13	Melbourne Storm	24	9	0	15	2	601	769	-168	22
14	Canterbury-Bankstown Bulldogs	24	6	3	15	2	462	686	-224	19
15	Wests Tigers	24	5	2	17	2	480	850	-370	16
16	New Zealand Warriors	24	3	0	21	2	396	892	-496	10

== Ladder ==
=== Ladder Progression ===
Numbers highlighted in green indicate that the team finished the round inside the top 8.

== Finals Series ==
=== Chart ===
Qualifying and elimination finals
10 Sept, Allianz Stadium
1	Cronulla	22
4	Parramatta	35
10 Sept, Allianz Stadium
5	North Queensland	16
8	Manly	30
9 Sept, Allianz Stadium
6	Brisbane	30
7	Newcastle	26
9 Sept, Allianz Stadium
2	Penrith	14
3	St George	18

Semi-finals
16 Sept, Allianz Stadium
Cronulla	22
Manly	44
15 Sept, Suncorp Stadium
Penrith	33
Brisbane	12

Preliminary finals
23 Sept, Allianz Stadium
Parramatta	28
Penrith	6
23 Sept, Sydney Football Stadium
St George	18
Manly	34

Grand final
1 Oct, ANZ Stadium
Parramatta	18
Manly	20

== Grand final ==
2017 Holden Cup Grand Final

Sunday, 1 October
13:35 AEDT (UTC+11)

Parramatta Eels U20s	18 – 20	Manly Warringah Sea Eagles U20s
Tries: 3 Dylan Brown 3'; Denzal Tonise 16'; Greg Leleisiuao 67'; Goals: 3 Dylan Brown 4', pen 11', 17' (3/4)	1st: 14–10; 2nd: 4–10	Tries: 4 Tevita Funa 29'; Bilal Maarbani 40'; Blake Andrews 43'; Keith Titmuss 79'; Goals: 2 Tevita Funa 40', 80' (2/4)

ANZ Stadium, Sydney
Referees: Phil Henderson, Adam Cassidy
Jack Gibson Medal: Cade Cust (Manly)
