= 2013 NRL Under-20s season =

- Teams: 16
- Premiers: Penrith Panthers (1st title)
- Minor premiers: Canberra Raiders (2nd title)
- Matches played: 201
- Points scored: 10,675
- Top points scorer(s): Patrick Templeman (307)
- Wooden spoon: Manly (2nd spoon)
- Player of the Year: Bryce Cartwright
- Top try-scorer(s): Jonathon Reuben (28)

The 2013 NRL Under-20s season (commercial known as the 2013 Holden Cup due to sponsorship from Holden) was the sixth season of the National Rugby League's Under-20s competition. It was formerly called the Toyota Cup until 2013 when Holden bought the sponsorship. The draw and structure of the competition mirrored that of the NRL's 2013 Telstra Premiership.

== Ladder ==
2013 National Youth Competition season
Pos	Team	Pld	W	D	L	B	PF	PA	PD	Pts
1	Canberra Raiders	24	19	1	4	2	765	614	+151	43
2	Penrith Panthers (P)	24	17	0	7	2	689	460	+229	38
3	Sydney Roosters	24	17	0	7	2	711	554	+157	38
4	Canterbury-Bankstown Bulldogs	24	16	1	7	2	846	626	+220	37
5	Wests Tigers	24	14	0	10	2	687	564	+123	32
6	New Zealand Warriors	24	13	2	9	2	679	599	+80	32
7	South Sydney Rabbitohs	24	12	1	11	2	607	608	-1	29
8	Brisbane Broncos	24	12	0	12	2	660	740	-80	28
9	Melbourne Storm	24	11	0	13	2	558	564	-6	26
10	North Queensland Cowboys	24	9	2	13	2	582	615	-33	24
11	St. George-Illawarra Dragons	24	9	1	14	2	596	663	-67	23
12	Newcastle Knights	24	9	0	15	2	584	602	-18	22
13	Cronulla-Sutherland Sharks	24	8	1	15	2	516	667	-151	21
14	Parramatta Eels	24	7	2	15	2	570	726	-156	20
15	Gold Coast Titans	24	7	0	17	2	520	786	-266	18
16	Manly-Warringah Sea Eagles	24	6	1	17	2	560	742	-182	17

== Finals series ==
Qualifying and elimination finals
15 September – Sydney
1	Canberra	26
4	Canterbury	27
13 September – Sydney
5	Warriors	20
8	South Sydney	18
14 September – Sydney
6	Penrith	48
7	Sydney	22
15 September – Sydney
2	Wests Tigers	26
3	Brisbane	22

Semi-finals
20 September – Sydney
Canberra	36
Wests Tigers	16
20 September – Sydney
Warriors	58
Sydney	6

Preliminary finals
27 September – Sydney
Canterbury	38
Warriors	54
28 September – Sydney
Penrith	36
Canberra	20

Grand final
6 October – Sydney
Warriors	30
Penrith	42

Home	Score	Away	Match Information
Home	Score	Away	Date and Time	Venue	Referees
Qualifying finals
(1) Canberra Raiders	26–27	(4) Canterbury-Bankstown Bulldogs	15 September 2013, 1:30pm	ANZ Stadium, Sydney	Chris Butler and Chris Sutton
(2) Penrith Panthers	48–22	(3) Sydney Roosters	14 September 2013, 1:30pm	Allianz Stadium, Sydney	Adam Gee and Jon Stone
Elimination finals
(5) Wests Tigers	26–22	(8) Brisbane Broncos	15 September 2013, 11:15am	ANZ Stadium, Sydney	Peter Gough and Shane Rehm
(6) New Zealand Warriors	20–18	(7) South Sydney Rabbitohs	13 September 2013, 5:15pm	ANZ Stadium, Sydney	David Munro and Matt Noyen
Semi-finals
Canberra Raiders	36–14	Wests Tigers	20 September 2013, 3:05pm	Allianz Stadium, Sydney	David Munro and Adam Gee
Sydney Roosters	6–58	New Zealand Warriors	20 September 2013, 5:15pm	Allianz Stadium, Sydney	Chris Butler and Chris Sutton
Preliminary Finals
Canterbury-Bankstown Bulldogs	38–54	New Zealand Warriors	27 September 2013, 5:15pm	ANZ Stadium, Sydney	David Munro and Adam Gee
Penrith Panthers	36–20	Canberra Raiders	28 September 2013, 5:15pm	Allianz Stadium, Sydney	Chris Butler and Chris Sutton
Grand Final
New Zealand Warriors	30–42	Penrith Panthers	6 October 2011, 3:55pm	ANZ Stadium, Sydney	Chris Butler and David Munro

== Stats ==
=== Leading try scorers ===
Top 10 try scorers
Pos	Name	Tries	Team
1	Jonathon Reuben	28	Canberra Raiders
2	Kurtis Rowe	26	Wests Tigers
3	John Sila	26	Canterbury-Bankstown Bulldogs
4	Tuimoala Lolohea	22	New Zealand Warriors
5	Jake Mamo	21	Newcastle Knights
6	Dane Chang	20	Melbourne Storm
6	Brenko Lee	20	Canberra Raiders
8	Brendan Elliot	19	Sydney Roosters
9	Jack Goodsell	18	Sydney Roosters
9	Javed Bowen	18	North Queensland Cowboys

=== Leading point scorers ===
Top 10 overall point scorers
Pos	Player	Team	T	G	FG	Points
1	Patrick Templeman	Canterbury Bulldogs	17	118	3	307
2	Manaia Rudolph	Wests Tigers	8	99	–	230
3	Bryce Cartwright	Penrith Panthers	12	64	–	176
4	Brendan Elliot	Sydney Roosters	19	42	–	160
5	Mitchell Brasington	Parramatta Eels	3	72	–	156
6	Matt McGahan	Melbourne Storm	8	58	–	148
7	Mason Lino	New Zealand Warriors	2	69	1	147
8	Tuimoala Lolohea	New Zealand Warriors	22	23	–	134
9	Jackson Hastings	St. George Illawarra Dragons	8	50	–	132
10	Mitch Cornish	Canberra Raiders	4	54	1	125

=== Leading goal scorers ===
Top 10 goal scorers
Pos	Player	Goals	Team
1	Patrick Templeman	118	Canterbury Bulldogs
2	Manaia Rudolph	99	Wests Tigers
3	Mitchell Brasington	72	Parramatta Eels
4	Mason Lino	69	New Zealand Warriors
5	Bryce Cartwright	64	Penrith Panthers
6	Matt McGahan	58	Melbourne Storm
7	Mitch Cornish	54	Canberra Raiders
8	Jackson Hastings	50	St. George Illawarra Dragons
9	Samisoni Langi	46	Sydney Roosters
10	Brendan Elliot	42	Sydney Roosters
10	Duncan Paia'aua	42	Brisbane Broncos

=== Leading field goal scorers ===
Top field goal scorers
Pos	Player	Team	FG
1	Patrick Templeman	Canterbury Bulldogs	3
Eight players tied with one field goal
