= NRL Under-20s =

Australasian rugby league football competition

National Youth Competition (Holden Cup)
- Sport: Rugby league
- Instituted: 2008
- Inaugural season: 2008
- Ceased: 2017
- Replaced by: Jersey Flegg Cup; Hastings Deering Colts
- Number of teams: 16
- Countries: Australia (15 teams); New Zealand (1 team)
- Premiers: Manly Warringah Sea Eagles (2017)
- Most titles: New Zealand Warriors (3 titles)
- Website: Official Holden Cup website
- Broadcast partner: Fox League (Australia); Sky Sport (New Zealand)
- Related competition: National Rugby League; Jersey Flegg Cup; Hastings Deering Colts

The NRL Under-20s (known commercially as the Holden Cup due to sponsorship from Holden) was the top league of professional rugby league for players aged 20 years or younger in Australasia. Contested by sixteen teams, the Under-20s competition commenced in 2008 and was originally known as the Toyota Cup. The competition runs parallel to Australasia's professional competition, the National Rugby League, with NYC matches played immediately prior to the NRL games. Similar to the NRL, the NYC enforces a salary cap and puts a heavy focus on life outside football for the players.

The New Zealand Warriors were the most successful club in the competition's short history, with three premierships from four Grand Final appearances; in 2010, 2011 and 2014. In 2018, the NRL Under-20s was replaced by state-based under-20s competitions in New South Wales and Queensland.

== History ==
The NRL Under-20s succeeded the Jersey Flegg Cup in 2008, which existed from 1961 to 2007. The competition was administered by the New South Wales Rugby League as an under-19s competition, until it was changed to an under-20s competition in 1998. On October 28, 2016 it was announced that the 2017 season will be the last for the NRL Under-20s. It was to be replaced by stronger State-based competitions in NSW and QLD, these being the reformed Jersey Flegg Cup in NSW and the new Hastings Deering Colts in Queensland.

== Teams ==
Club	City	2017 coach	Premierships
Brisbane Broncos	Brisbane, Queensland	Scott Tronc	0
Canterbury-Bankstown Bulldogs	Sydney, New South Wales	Brad Henderson	0
Canberra Raiders	Canberra, Australian Capital Territory	Brett White	1
Cronulla-Sutherland Sharks	Sydney, New South Wales	John Morris	0
Gold Coast Titans	Gold Coast, Queensland	Ben Woolf	0
Manly Warringah Sea Eagles	Sydney, New South Wales	Wayne Lambkin	1
Melbourne Storm	Melbourne, Victoria	Eric Smith	1
Newcastle Knights	Newcastle, New South Wales	Todd Lowrie	0
New Zealand Warriors	Auckland, New Zealand	Grant Pocklington	3
North Queensland Cowboys	Townsville, Queensland	Aaron Payne	0
Parramatta Eels	Sydney, New South Wales	Luke Burt	0
Penrith Panthers	Sydney, New South Wales	David Tangata-Toa	2
South Sydney Rabbitohs	Sydney, New South Wales	Ryan Carr	0
St. George Illawarra Dragons	Wollongong, New South Wales; Sydney, New South Wales	Wayne Collins	0
Sydney Roosters	Sydney, New South Wales	Anthony Barnes	1
Wests Tigers	Sydney, New South Wales	Chris Hutchinson	1

== Premiership winners ==
Season	Premiers	Score	Runners-up	Referee	Venue	Date
National Youth Competition
2008	Canberra Raiders	28 – 24	Brisbane Broncos	S. Hayne	ANZ Stadium Sydney	5 October 2008
2009	Melbourne Storm	24 – 22	Wests Tigers	G. Reynolds	ANZ Stadium Sydney	4 October 2009
2010	New Zealand Warriors	42 – 28	South Sydney Rabbitohs	G. Reynolds	ANZ Stadium Sydney	3 October 2010
2011	New Zealand Warriors (2)	31 – 30	North Queensland Cowboys	D. Munro	ANZ Stadium Sydney	2 October 2011
2012	Wests Tigers	46 – 6	Canberra Raiders	G. Atkins	ANZ Stadium Sydney	30 September 2012
2013	Penrith Panthers	42 – 30	New Zealand Warriors	C. Butler D. Munro	ANZ Stadium Sydney	6 October 2013
2014	New Zealand Warriors (3)	34 – 32	Brisbane Broncos	C. Butler C. Sutton	ANZ Stadium Sydney	5 October 2014
2015	Penrith Panthers (2)	34 – 18	Manly-Warringah Sea Eagles	A. Gee P. Gough	ANZ Stadium Sydney	4 October 2015
2016	Sydney Roosters	30 – 28	Penrith Panthers	Z Przeklasa-Adamski D. Oultram	ANZ Stadium Sydney	2 October 2016
2017	Manly-Warringah Sea Eagles	20 – 18	Parramatta Eels	P. Henderson A. Cassidy	ANZ Stadium Sydney	1 October 2017

=== Team performance ===
Team	Premierships		Runners-up		Minor premierships		Wooden spoons	
Team	Total	Season(s)	Total	Season(s)	Total	Season(s)	Total	Season(s)
Brisbane Broncos	0	–	2	2008, 2014	0	–	0	–
Canberra Raiders	1	2008	1	2012	2	2008, 2013	0	–
Canterbury-Bankstown Bulldogs	0	–	0	–	1	2012	1	2014
Cronulla-Sutherland Sharks	0	–	0	–	1	2017	1	2009
Gold Coast Titans	0	–	0	–	0	–	1	2012
Manly Warringah Sea Eagles	1	2017	1	2015	1	2009	3	2011, 2013, 2016
Melbourne Storm	1	2009	0	–	0	–	0	–
New Zealand Warriors	3	2010, 2011, 2014	1	2013	1	2011	1	2017
Newcastle Knights	0	–	0	–	1	2014	0	–
North Queensland Cowboys	0	–	1	2011	0	–	1	2008
Parramatta Eels	0	–	1	2017	0	–	1	2011
Penrith Panthers	2	2013, 2015	1	2016	2	2015, 2016	0	–
South Sydney Rabbitohs	0	–	1	2010	1	2011	1	2015
St. George Illawarra Dragons	0	–	0	–	0	–	0	–
Sydney Roosters	1	2016	0	–	0	–	0	–
Wests Tigers	1	2012	1	2009	0	–	0	–

=== Comprehensive regular season results ===
Comprehensive regular season results of the National Youth Competition by club.

Team	2008	2009	2010	2011	2012	2013	2014
Brisbane Broncos	2nd	5th	10th	9th	12th	8th	
Canberra Raiders	1st	8th	6th	13th	3rd	1st	
Canterbury-Bankstown Bulldogs	7th	11th	3rd	6th	1st	4th	
Cronulla-Sutherland Sharks	14th	16th	14th	3rd	10th	13th	
Gold Coast Titans	8th	14th	8th	14th	16th	15th	
Manly-Warringah Sea Eagles	11th	1st	7th	16th	14th	16th	
Melbourne Storm	13th	3rd	13th	4th	9th	9th	
Newcastle Knights	12th	10th	12th	8th	11th	12th	
New Zealand Warriors	3rd	7th	2nd	1st	2nd	6th	
North Queensland Cowboys	16th	9th	4th	2nd	13th	10th	
Parramatta Eels	5th	12th	16th	12th	15th	14th	
Penrith Panthers	4th	13th	15th	10th	5th	2nd	
St. George Illawarra Dragons	6th	2nd	11th	11th	8th	11th	
South Sydney Rabbitohs	10th	6th	1st	15th	6th	7th	
Sydney Roosters	15th	15th	5th	5th	7th	3rd	
Wests Tigers	9th	4th	9th	7th	4th	5th	

== Awards ==
=== Player of the Year ===
The National Youth Competition Player of the Year award is the premier individual award in the National Youth Competition. The voting for the award is similar to the Dally M Medal voting, where after each National Youth Competition game 3 points are awarded to the best player on ground, 2 points to the second and 1 point to the third. As of 2017, every winner of the award has gone on to play first grade in the NRL. The inaugural winner was Ben Hunt from the Brisbane Broncos in 2008. Hunt is also the youngest player to win the award, at age 18 years, 5 months and 13 days.

Year	Winner	Position	Team
2008	Ben Hunt	Halfback	Brisbane Broncos
2009	Beau Henry	Halfback	St. George Illawarra Dragons
2010	Tariq Sims	Prop	Brisbane Broncos
2011	Jack De Belin	Second-row	St. George Illawarra Dragons
2012	David Klemmer	Prop	Canterbury-Bankstown Bulldogs
2013	Bryce Cartwright	Second-row	Penrith Panthers
2014	Kane Elgey	Halfback	Gold Coast Titans
2015	Ashley Taylor	Halfback	Brisbane Broncos
2016	Jayden Brailey	Hooker	Cronulla-Sutherland Sharks
2017	Jake Clifford	Halfback	North Queensland Cowboys

=== Jack Gibson Medal ===
The Jack Gibson Medal is awarded to the man of the match of the Toyota Cup grand final. The award is named after legendary rugby league coach, Jack Gibson. Gibson, who guided Eastern Suburbs to premierships in 1974 and 1975, the Parramatta Eels to three successive premierships from 1981 to 1983 and was named coach of the Team of the Century, died in 2008.

Year	Winner	Position	Team
2008	Josh Dugan	Fullback	Canberra Raiders
2009	Luke Kelly	Halfback	Melbourne Storm
2010	Carlos Tuimavave	Five-eighth	New Zealand Warriors
2011	Jordan Meads	Halfback	New Zealand Warriors
2012	Matt Mulcahy	Five-eighth	Wests Tigers
2013	James Roberts	Centre	Penrith Panthers
2014	Solomone Kata	Centre	New Zealand Warriors
2015	Soni Luke	Hooker	Penrith Panthers
2016	Nat Butcher	Lock	Sydney Roosters
2017	Cade Cust	Halfback	Manly Warringah Sea Eagles

== Television coverage ==
=== Australia ===
- Free to air: Channel 9 showed the Grand Final as part of the Grand Final Coverage.
- Subscription television: FOX Sports show 2 games live every weekend, live coverage of the Toyota Cup precede Fox Sports' Super Saturday and Sunday live NRL coverage.

=== New Zealand ===
- All New Zealand Warriors home games in the U20's competition are shown live by Sky NZ. Māori Television also broadcasts Ngāti NRL, a series that focuses on young Māori and Pacific Islanders who travel to Australia and play in the Toyota Cup.

== See also ==
- List of records in the National Youth Competition (rugby league)
- Rugby League Competitions in Australia
