= 2026 New Zealand Warriors season =

New Zealand rugby league club season

- NRL Rank: 2nd
- Play-off result: Semifinals
- 2026 record: Wins: 18; draws: 0; losses: 8
- Points scored: For: 754; against: 456

Team information
- CEO: Cameron George
- Coach: (Australia) Andrew Webster
- Captain: Mitch Barnett and James Fisher-Harris
- Stadium: Go Media Stadium (capacity: 25,000); Hnry Stadium (capacity: 34,500; round 8 only); One New Zealand Stadium (capacity: 30,000; round 16 only); Eden Park (capacity: 50,000; semifinal only)
- Avg. attendance: 27,403
- Agg. attendance: 356,235
- High attendance: 48,511 (vs. Newcastle Knights, semifinal, at Eden Park, Auckland)

Top scorers
- Tries: Dallin Watene-Zelezniak (20)
- Goals: Tanah Boyd (40)
- Points: Tanah Boyd (92)
← 2025	List of seasons	2027 →

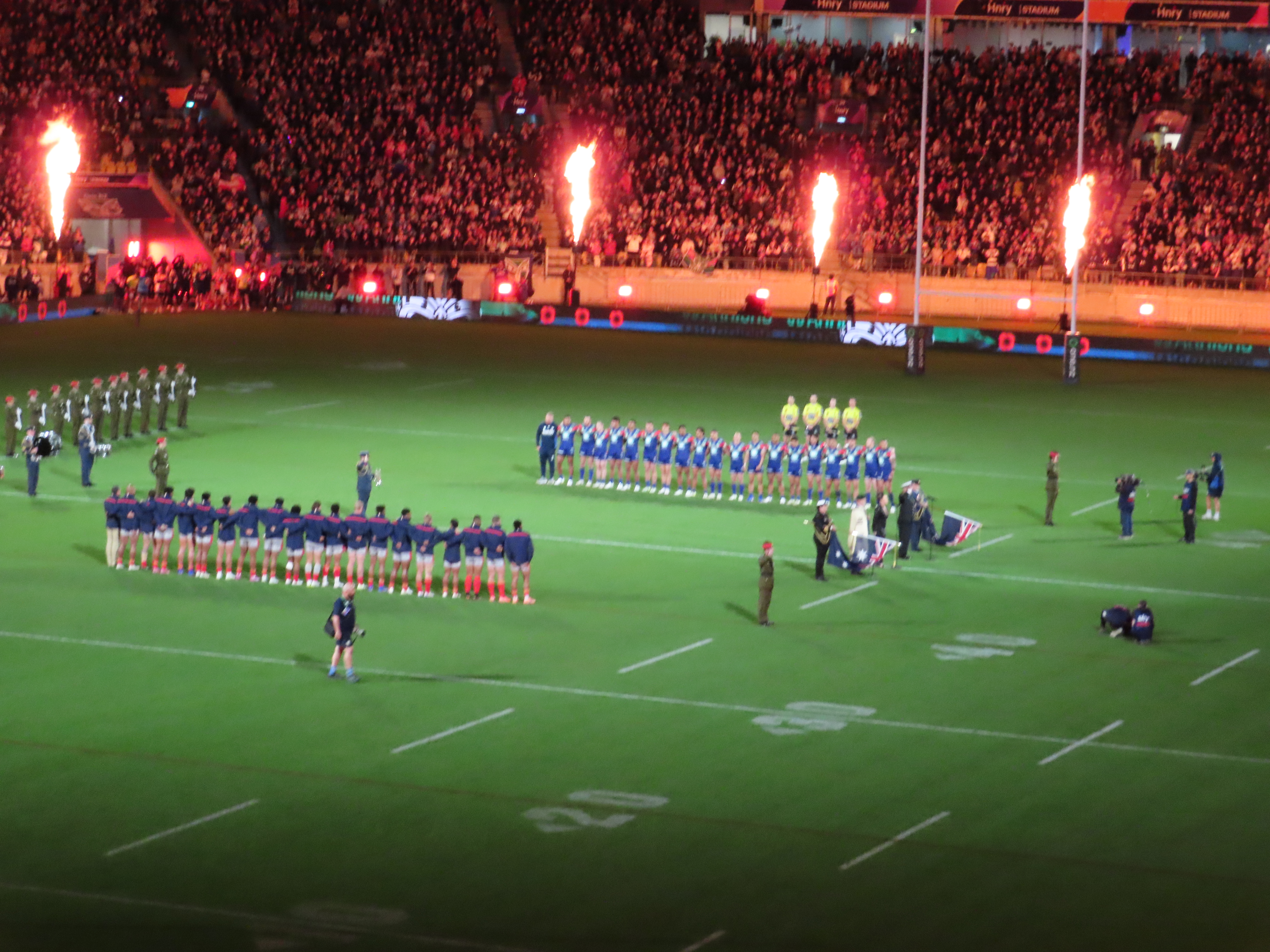
Match between the Warriors and the Dolphins on Anzac Day at Hnry Stadium, Wellington

The 2026 New Zealand Warriors season was the 32nd season in the club's history. They competed in the National Rugby League (NRL).

Andrew Webster continued as head coach for a fourth consecutive season. Mitch Barnett and James Fisher-Harris were the co-captains for a second consecutive and final season. In February 2026, Barnett announced he would leave the Warriors once the season concluded. On 20 August, head coach Webster was re-signed until the end of the 2032 season.

The Warriors commenced their NRL season on 6 March against the Sydney Roosters at Go Media Stadium, Auckland. The regular season concluded on 5 September, with the Warriors securing a top two finish. The New Zealand club qualified for the playoffs for the eleventh time, and the third time in four years. The Warriors' season came to a conclusion on 20 September, following successive defeats in the qualifying final against the Dolphins and in the semifinal against the Newcastle Knights.

== Squad ==
New Zealand Warriors 2026 squad
Top 30 squad - 2026 NRL season			Supplementary list	Coaching staff
Mitchell Barnett (c) – PR, LK; Rocco Berry – CE; Tanah Boyd – HB; Kurt Capewell – SR, CE; Erin Clark – LK; Wayde Egan (vc) – HK; Kayliss Fatialofa – SR; James Fisher-Harris (c) – PR; Jackson Ford – PR; Morgan Gannon – SR	Leka Halasima – SR; Chanel Harris-Tavita – FE; Sam Healey – HK; Eddie Ieremia-Toeava – SR; Alofiana Khan-Pereira – WG; Jacob Laban – SR; Ali Leiataua – CE; Jye Linnane – FE; Te Maire Martin – FE; Haizyn Mellars – WG	Luke Metcalf – HB; Charnze Nicoll-Klokstad – FB; Marata Niukore – SR; Adam Pompey – CE, WG; Tanner Stowers-Smith – PR; Taine Tuaupiki – WG, FB; Roger Tuivasa-Sheck – WG; Demitric Vaimauga – PR; Dallin Watene-Zelezniak – WG	Jett Cleary – HB; Luke Hanson – FE; Motu Pasikala – FB, WG; Caelys-Paul Putoko – CE; Jason Salalilo – PR; Makaia Tafua – HK	Head coach: Andrew Webster; Assistant coaches: Richard Agar (Backs); Stacey Jones (Halves & Special Plays); Slade Griffin (Forwards); Balin Cupples (High Performance); Kai Kara-France (Wrestling); Daryl Halligan (Goalkicking); David Tangata-Toa (NSW Cup coach); Legend: (c) Captain(s); (vc) Vice-captain(s); Updated: 2 October 2026; Source(s): Warriors Football Department

== Squad changes and contract extensions ==
These movements happened across the previous season, off-season and preseason. Contract extensions occurred either during the preseason or the 2026 NRL season.

=== Transfers in ===
Player	Previous club	Length	Ref.
Morgan Gannon	Leeds Rhinos (Super League)	2028	
Harry Inch	Tasman / Crusaders (rugby union)	2027	
Alofiana Khan-Pereira	Gold Coast Titans	2028	
Jye Linnane	Newcastle Knights	2028	
Braelan Marsh	Redcliffe Dolphins (Queensland Cup)	2028	
Haizyn Mellars	South Sydney Rabbitohs	2028	
Riley Price	Redcliffe Dolphins (Queensland Cup)	2027	
Luke Laulilii	Wests Tigers	2026	

=== Transfers out ===
Player	New Club	Ref.
Bunty Afoa	Wests Tigers	
Tom Ale	Penrith Panthers	
Morgan Harper	Newtown Jets (NSW Cup)	
Edward Kosi	South Sydney Rabbitohs	
Kalani Going	Penrith Panthers	
Moala Graham-Taufa	South Sydney Rabbitohs	
Freddy Lussick	Penrith Panthers	

=== Contract extensions ===
Player/Coach	Length	Date announced	Ref.
Luke Metcalf	2028	23 October 2025	
Eddie Ieremia-Toeava	2028	19 December 2025	
Taine Tuaupiki	2028	27 February 2026	
Erin Clark	2029	15 April 2026	
Chanel Harris-Tavita	2027	21 May 2026	
Tanah Boyd	2029	22 May 2026	
Jason Salalilo	2029	12 June 2026	
Dallin Watene-Zelezniak	2028	6 July 2026	
Te Maire Martin	2027	6 July 2026	
Kurt Capewell	2027	15 July 2026	
Jackson Ford	2029	5 August 2026	
Chanel Harris-Tavita	2029	18 August 2026	
Andrew Webster	2032	20 August 2026	
Tanner Stowers-Smith	2030	2 September 2026	

== Pre-season ==
The Warriors played against the Manly Warringah Sea Eagles in Napier and the Dolphins in Sydney as their pre-season fixtures. Both matches were part of the fourth edition of the NRL Pre-season Challenge.

Win Draw Loss

Round 2: 14 February	New Zealand Warriors	18–33	Manly Warringah Sea Eagles	Napier
15:40 NZDT	Tries: Leiataua 4', 38'; Tauafiafi-Iutoi 71'; Tafua 75'; Goals: Boyd 40' (1/2); Norris (0/1); Inch (0/1)	Report	Tries: Bryan 10'; Hart 30', 43'; Faulalo 34'; Wilson 58'; Muagututia 78'; Goals: Wakeham 11', 32', 59', 79' (4/6); Drop goals: Walsh 80' (1/1)	Stadium: McLean Park; Attendance: 13,575; Referee: Ashley Klein

Round 3: 20 February	Dolphins	38–34	New Zealand Warriors	Sydney
18:00 AEDT	Tries: Cobbo 9'; Schneider 19'; Fuller 42'; Isaako 46'; Naufahu 69'; Fineanganofo 72'; Pouniu 75'; Goals: Isaako 20', 44' (2/4); Schneider 70', 73', 76' (3/3); Sin bin: Molo (yellow card) 53' to 63'	Report	Tries: Ford 4'; Egan 24'; Watene-Zelezniak 36', 58'; Leiataua 54'; Ieremia-Toeava 60'; Goals: Boyd 6', 26', 37', 55' (4/5); Tuaupiki 62' (1/1); Sin bin: Ford (yellow card) 12' to 22'	Stadium: Leichhardt Oval; Attendance: 6,073; Referee: Grant Atkins

== Regular season ==
=== League table ===
Pos	Team	Pld	W	D	L	B	PF	PA	PD	Pts	Qualification
1	Penrith Panthers	24	18	0	6	3	683	347	+336	42	Advance to finals series
2	New Zealand Warriors	24	18	0	6	3	728	418	+310	42	Advance to finals series
3	Dolphins	24	17	0	7	3	662	506	+156	40	Advance to finals series
4	Sydney Roosters	24	16	0	8	3	619	501	+118	38	Advance to finals series
5	Cronulla-Sutherland Sharks	24	14	0	10	3	672	523	+149	34	Advance to finals series
6	South Sydney Rabbitohs	24	14	0	10	3	694	581	+113	34	Advance to finals series
7	Newcastle Knights	24	14	0	10	3	633	591	+42	34	Advance to finals series
8	North Queensland Cowboys	24	13	0	11	3	568	652	−84	32	Advance to finals series
9	Manly Warringah Sea Eagles	24	11	0	13	3	623	524	+99	28	
10	Melbourne Storm	24	11	0	13	3	594	576	+18	28	
11	Canberra Raiders	24	11	0	13	3	581	626	−45	28	
12	Canterbury-Bankstown Bulldogs	24	11	0	13	3	476	536	−60	28	
13	Parramatta Eels	24	9	0	15	3	497	678	−181	24	
14	Brisbane Broncos	24	8	0	16	3	471	677	−206	22	
15	Wests Tigers	24	8	0	16	3	445	699	−254	22	
16	Gold Coast Titans	24	6	0	18	3	477	663	−186	18	
17	St. George Illawarra Dragons	24	5	0	19	3	392	717	−325	16	

Updated to match(es) played on 6 September 2026. Source: National Rugby League
Rules for classification: 1) competition points; 2) points differential; 3) percentage; (Note: Greater percentage of points scored for and against, being determined by points scored for divided by points scored against expressed as a percentage.) 4) tries scored; (Note: Further tiebreakers (in order) include goals scored, field goals kicked; least amount of penalties conceded.)

=== Results by round ===
Round	1	2	3	4	5	6	7	8	9	10	11	12	13	14	15	16	17	18	19	20	21	22	23	24	25	26	27
Ground	H	H	A	H	A	A	H	H	A	–	A	A	A	–	H	H	A	–	A	H	A	A	H	A	A	H	H
Result	W	W	W	L	L	W	W	W	W	B	W	W	L	B	L	W	L	B	W	W	L	W	W	W	W	W	W
Position	4	2	1	2	5	3	2	2	2	2	2	2	2	2	2	2	2	2	2	2	3	3	3	3	1	1	2
Points	2	4	6	6	6	8	10	12	14	16	18	20	20	22	22	24	24	26	28	30	30	32	34	36	38	40	42

Source: National Rugby League
A = Away; H = Home; B = Bye; W = Win; D = Draw; L = Loss

=== Matches ===
The league fixtures were released on 14 November 2025.

Win Draw Loss Fixtures

Round 1: 6 March	New Zealand Warriors	42–18	Sydney Roosters	Auckland
20:00 NZDT	Tries: Boyd 10'; Pompey 23'; Capewell 27'; Harris-Tavita 33', 75'; Halasima 46'; Nicoll-Klokstad 78'; Goals: Boyd 12', 29', 35', 48', 59 pen.', 77', 78' (7/8)	Report	Tries: Tedesco 15'; Smith 50'; Crichton 55'; Goals: Walker 16', 52', 56' (3/3)	Stadium: Go Media Stadium; Attendance: 24,112; Referee: Wyatt Raymond

Round 2: 13 March	New Zealand Warriors	40–6	Canberra Raiders	Auckland
20:00 NZDT	Tries: Watene-Zelezniak 13', 77'; Leiataua 41'; Halasima 48', 67'; Ford 62'; Boyd 74'; Goals: Boyd 33 pen.', 43', 49', 64', 69' (5/7); Tuivasa-Sheck 77' (1/1)	Report	Tries: Weekes 4'; Goals: Sanders 6' (1/1)	Stadium: Go Media Stadium; Attendance: 23,067; Referee: Peter Gough

Round 3: 21 March	Newcastle Knights	12–38	New Zealand Warriors	Newcastle
15:00 AEDT	Tries: Hunt 3'; Marzhew 65'; Goals: Smith 4', 67' (2/2); Sin bin: Hunt (yellow card) 32' to 42'; Mooney (yellow card) 75' to 80'	Report	Tries: Clark 12'; Ford 29'; Halasima 38'; Fisher-Harris 51'; Boyd 54'; Hanson 80'; Goals: Boyd 25 pen.', 30', 39', 53', 56' (5/6); Tuaupiki 76 pen.' (1/1); Ford 80' (1/1)	Stadium: Newcastle International Sports Centre; Attendance: 21,682; Referee: Liam Kennedy

Round 4: 27 March	New Zealand Warriors	14–32	Wests Tigers	Auckland
20:00 NZDT	Tries: Nicoll-Klokstad 9', 68'; Laban 15'; Goals: Boyd 16' (1/3); Sin bin: Pompey (yellow card) 18' to 28'	Report	Tries: Tavana 32'; Pearce-Paul 35'; Hunt 39'; Bula 59'; Madden 73'; Turuva 79'; Goals: Madden 37', 40', 60', 74' (4/6)	Stadium: Go Media Stadium; Attendance: 24,246; Referee: Adam Gee

Round 5: 5 April	Cronulla-Sutherland Sharks	36–22	New Zealand Warriors	Cronulla
14:00 AEST	Tries: Kennedy 13', 17'; Iro 24'; Burns 33'; Wilton 50'; Talakai 63'; Goals: Hynes 15', 18', 25', 35', 51', 65' (6/6)	Report	Tries: Watene-Zelezniak 5', 27', 42'; Clark 76'; Goals: Boyd 8 pen.', 43', 76' (3/5)	Stadium: Ocean Protect Stadium; Attendance: 13,112; Referee: Ziggy Przeklasa-Adamski

Round 6: 11 April	Melbourne Storm	14–38	New Zealand Warriors	Melbourne
19:30 AEST	Tries: Clarke 16'; Howarth 23'; Goals: Meaney 3 pen.', 18', 24' (3/3)	Report	Tries: Leiataua 9'; Niukore 14'; Watene-Zelezniak 30', 51'; Tuivasa-Sheck 43'; Ford 47'; Goals: Boyd 11', 15', 39 pen.', 45', 48', 53', 58 pen.' (7/8)	Stadium: AAMI Park; Attendance: 26,467; Referee: Grant Atkins

Round 7: 18 April	New Zealand Warriors	28–20	Gold Coast Titans	Auckland
17:00 NZST	Tries: Khan-Pereira 5', 22'; Harris-Tavita 29'; Watene-Zelezniak 34'; Clark 52'; Goals: Boyd 24', 30', 39 pen.', 54' (4/6)	Report	Tries: Fifita 50'; Faeamani 68'; Hau 72'; Morrin 78'; Goals: Campbell 73', 78' (2/4)	Stadium: Go Media Stadium; Attendance: 24,112; Referee: Wyatt Raymond

Round 8: 25 April	New Zealand Warriors	20–18	Dolphins	Wellington
20:05 NZST	Tries: Khan-Pereira 3', 28'; Watene-Zelezniak 25'; Tuaupiki 61'; Goals: Boyd 5', 63' (2/4)	Report	Tries: Farnworth 10'; Isaako 17', 19'; Goals: Isaako 11', 18', 21' (3/3); Sin bin: Flegler (yellow card) 63' to 73'	Stadium: Hnry Stadium; Attendance: 34,812; Referee: Liam Kennedy

Round 9: 2 May	Parramatta Eels	14–36	New Zealand Warriors	Sydney
17:30 AEST	Tries: Volkman 4', 59'; Penisini 44'; Goals: Moses 5' (1/3)	Report	Tries: Halasima 13'; Khan-Pereira 18', 69'; Watene-Zelezniak 24'; Ford 63'; Tuivasa-Sheck 76'; Goals: Boyd 15', 40 pen.', 50 pen.', 65', 71', 77' (6/8)	Stadium: CommBank Stadium; Attendance: 16,657; Referee: Gerard Sutton

Round 10 (Bye for New Zealand Warriors)

Round 11: 17 May	New Zealand Warriors	42–12	Brisbane Broncos	Brisbane
16:05 AEST	Tries: Watene-Zelezniak 12', 68'; Clark 21'; Egan 27'; Capewell 33'; Leiataua 44'; Martin 47'; Goals: Tuaupiki 23', 28', 35', 45', 48' (5/6); Harris-Tavita 59 pen.', 69' (2/2); Sin bin: Khan-Pereira (yellow card) 37' to 47'	Report	Tries: Reynolds 40', 51'; Goals: Reynolds 42', 53' (2/2); Sin bin: Carrigan (yellow card) 26' to 36'	Stadium: Suncorp Stadium; Attendance: 50,386; Referee: Ashley Klein

Round 12: 23 May	St. George Illawarra Dragons	12–30	New Zealand Warriors	Sydney
17:30 AEST	Tries: Tu 5'; Tuipulotu 64'; Goals: Holmes 7', 66' (2/2)	Report	Tries: Khan-Pereira 11', 62'; Martin 16', 46'; Watene-Zelezniak 33', 71'; Goals: Harris-Tavita 13', 48', 73' (3/6)	Stadium: St George Venues Jubilee Stadium; Attendance: 8,741; Referee: Adam Gee

Round 13: 31 May	Penrith Panthers	20–18	New Zealand Warriors	Sydney
18:15 AEST	Tries: McLean 5', 29'; Alamoti 37', 69'; Goals: Alamoti 31', 38' (2/4)	Report	Tries: Laban 16'; Tuaupiki 53'; Khan-Pereira 58'; Goals: Pompey 17', 55', 59' (3/3)	Stadium: CommBank Stadium; Attendance: 17,640; Referee: Gerard Sutton

Round 14 (Bye for New Zealand Warriors)

Round 15: 13 June	New Zealand Warriors	8–10	Cronulla-Sutherland Sharks	Auckland
19:30 NZST	Tries: Martin 28'; Goals: Pompey 30', 62 pen.' (2/3)	Report	Tries: Ramien 24'; Goals: Trindall 17 pen.', 26' (2/2); Drop goals: Trindall 78' (1/1)	Stadium: Go Media Stadium; Attendance: 24,938; Referee: Gerard Sutton

Round 16: 21 June	New Zealand Warriors	38–20	North Queensland Cowboys	Christchurch
16:00 NZST	Tries: Nicoll-Klokstad 6', 9', 33', 47'; Watene-Zelezniak 54'; Pompey 69'; Tuaupiki 73'; Goals: Pompey 8', 49', 55', 70', 74' (5/7)	Report	Tries: Burns 22', 61'; Drinkwater 26'; Nanai 76'; Goals: Clifford 28', 62' (2/4); Sin bin: Taumalolo (yellow card) 52' to 62'	Stadium: One New Zealand Stadium; Attendance: 24,365; Referee: Grant Atkins

Round 17: 27 June	Dolphins	26–24	New Zealand Warriors	Brisbane
15:00 AEST	Tries: Cobbo 4', 77'; Farnworth 23'; Isaako 38', 49'; Goals: Isaako 25', 39', 77' (3/5)	Report	Tries: Laban 7'; Watene-Zelezniak 17'; Nicoll-Klokstad 60'; Healey 74'; Goals: Pompey 9', 19', 61', 76' (4/4)	Stadium: Suncorp Stadium; Attendance: 40,465; Referee: Adam Gee

Round 18 (Bye for New Zealand Warriors)

Round 19: 10 July	Wests Tigers	6–32	New Zealand Warriors	Sydney
20:00 AEST	Tries: Fainu 26'; Goals: Doueihi 27' (1/1); Sin bin: Afoa (yellow card) 12' to 22'	Report	Tries: Fisher-Harris 2'; Khan-Pereira 13', 49'; Leiataua 16'; Egan 52'; Healey 74'; Goals: Pompey 4' (1/3); Harris-Tavita 51', 53', 75' (3/3)	Stadium: Campbelltown Sports Stadium; Attendance: 10,445; Referee: Wyatt Raymond

Round 20: 18 July	New Zealand Warriors	20–12	St. George Illawarra Dragons	Auckland
19:30 NZST	Tries: Pompey 3'; Khan-Pereira 32'; Watene-Zelezniak 44'; Goals: Harris-Tavita 20 pen.', 46', 69 pen.', 78 pen.' (4/6)	Report	Tries: Gutherson 13'; Stewart 35'; Goals: Holmes 14', 37' (2/2)	Stadium: Go Media Stadium; Attendance: 23,895; Referee: Jarrod Cole

Round 21: 25 July	Canterbury-Bankstown Bulldogs	18–6	New Zealand Warriors	Sydney
17:30 AEST	Tries: Crichton 5'; Preston 11'; Kiraz 46'; Goals: Crichton 6', 13', 71 pen.' (3/4)	Report	Tries: Harris-Tavita 74'; Goals: Harris-Tavita 75' (1/1)	Stadium: Accor Stadium; Attendance: 22,135; Referee: Adam Gee

Round 22: 1 August	Gold Coast Titans	6–42	New Zealand Warriors	Gold Coast
15:00 AEST	Tries: Hau 23'; Goals: Campbell 24' (1/1); Sin bin: Brimson (yellow card) 55' to 65'	Report	Tries: Watene-Zelezniak 6'; Khan-Pereira 10'; Harris-Tavita 16'; Halasima 28'; Laban 36'; Ieremia-Toeava 47'; Martin 63', 69'; Goals: Harris-Tavita 17', 30', 37', 48', 71' (5/8)	Stadium: Cbus Super Stadium; Attendance: 25,181; Referee: Jarrod Cole

Round 23: 7 August	New Zealand Warriors	28–12	Penrith Panthers	Auckland
20:00 NZST	Tries: Clark 4'; Metcalf 11', 76'; Harris-Tavita 30'; Nicoll-Klokstad 43'; Goals: Metcalf 6', 13', 31', 78' (4/5)	Report	Tries: Cleary 67'; Edgar 70'; Goals: Cleary 68', 71' (2/2); Sin bin: Alamoti (yellow card) 23' to 33'	Stadium: Go Media Stadium; Attendance: 25,987; Referee: Gerard Sutton

Round 24: 15 August	Brisbane Broncos	6–40	New Zealand Warriors	Brisbane
19:30 AEST	Tries: Willison 60'; Goals: Duffy 62' (1/1)	Report	Tries: Laban 8'; Harris-Tavita 13'; Khan-Pereira 18'; Nicoll-Klokstad 45'; Watene-Zelezniak 51'; Leiataua 55'; Halasima 77'; Goals: Metcalf 15', 19' (2/3); Harris-Tavita 25 pen.', 38 pen.', 53', 56' (4/6)	Stadium: Suncorp Stadium; Attendance: 38,916; Referee: Wyatt Raymond

Round 25: 22 August	South Sydney Rabbitohs	26–45	New Zealand Warriors	Sydney
17:30 AEST	Tries: Wighton 13'; Johnston 26', 53'; Duncan 48'; Walker 60'; Goals: Sullivan 49', 54', 61' (3/5)	Report	Tries: Fisher-Harris 5'; Halasima 7'; Barnett 20'; Harris-Tavita 32'; Watene-Zelezniak 44'; Laban 68'; Khan-Pereira 73'; Goals: Tuaupiki 6', 9', 21', 33', 36 pen.', 46', 70', 75' (8/8); Drop goals: Hanson 79' (1/1)	Stadium: Accor Stadium; Attendance: Todd Smith; Referee: 19,531

Round 26: 30 August	New Zealand Warriors	46–32	Newcastle Knights	Auckland
16:00 NZST	Tries: Laban 18', 76'; Egan 22'; Clark 26'; Vaimauga 35'; Leiataua 42'; Pompey 51'; Khan-Pereira 62'; Goals: Tuaupiki 23', 27', 36', 44', 52', 63', 77' (7/8)	Report	Tries: Hunt 4', 39'; Manuleleua 9'; McEwen 14'; Marzhew 54', 57'; Goals: Smith 11', 16', 56', 58' (4/6); Sent off: Saifiti (red card) 12'	Stadium: Go Media Stadium; Attendance: 25,853; Referee: Adam Gee

Round 27: 5 September	New Zealand Warriors	31–30	Manly Warringah Sea Eagles	Auckland
17:00 NZST	Tries: Pompey 11'; Tuaupiki 20', 25', 67'; Nicoll-Klokstad 30', 45'; Goals: Tuaupiki 22', 27', 69' (3/6); Drop goals: Harris-Tavita 77' (1/1)	Report	Tries: Garrick 4', 64'; Hopoate 16', 51'; Feledy 48'; Goals: Fogarty 6', 18', 50', 52', 66' (5/5); Sin bin: Trbojevic (yellow card) 27' to 37'	Stadium: Go Media Stadium; Attendance: 26,206; Referee: Gerard Sutton

== Finals series ==
The Warriors qualified for the finals series for the 11th time in their history and third time in four years. On 6 September, the Penrith Panthers defeated the Wests Tigers 38–10 and thereby won the minor premiership, with the Warriors finishing in 2nd place. The Warriors' opponents for the qualifying final the following week were confirmed as the Dolphins, who placed 3rd in the regular season.

Qualifying Final: 12 September	New Zealand Warriors	16–26	Dolphins	Auckland
18:05 NZST	Tries: Tuaupiki 15'; Goals: Tuaupiki 8 pen.', 16', 20 pen.', 40 pen.', 50 pen.', 52 pen.' (6/6); Sin bin: Pompey (yellow card) 28' to 38'; Capewell (yellow card) 33' to 43'	Report	Tries: Cobbo 25'; Farnworth 60'; Tabuai-Fidow 66'; Bostock 74'; Goals: Isaako 12 pen.', 27', 62', 68', 76' (5/5); Sin bin: Cobbo (yellow card) 33' to 43'	Stadium: Go Media Stadium; Attendance: 26,131; Referee: Adam Gee

Semifinal: 20 September	New Zealand Warriors	10–12	Newcastle Knights	Auckland
18:05 NZST	Tries: Halasima 12', 69'; Goals: Tuaupiki 14' (1/2)	Report	Tries: Sharpe 28'; Young 44'; Goals: Smith 30', 46' (2/2)	Stadium: Eden Park; Attendance: 48,511; Referee: Ashley Klein

== Statistics ==
As of end of season.

Appearances, tries, and points

Player	Appearances	Tries	Goals	Field goals	Points
Mitchell Barnett	17	1	0	0	4
Tanah Boyd	10	3	40	0	92
Kurt Capewell	15	2	0	0	8
Erin Clark	26	6	0	0	24
Jett Cleary	1	0	0	0	0
Wayde Egan	25	3	0	0	12
James Fisher-Harris	23	3	0	0	12
Jackson Ford	15	4	1	0	18
Morgan Gannon	3	0	0	0	0
Leka Halasima	21	10	0	0	40
Luke Hanson	3	1	0	1	5
Chanel Harris-Tavita	22	8	22	1	77
Sam Healey	22	2	0	0	8
Eddie Ieremia-Toeava	13	1	0	0	4
Alofiana Khan-Pereira	20	16	0	0	64
Jacob Laban	25	8	0	0	32
Luke Laulilii	1	0	0	0	0
Ali Leiataua	22	6	0	0	24
Te Maire Martin	13	6	0	0	24
Luke Metcalf	4	2	6	0	20
Charnze Nicoll-Klokstad	16	12	0	0	48
Marata Niukore	9	1	0	0	4
Adam Pompey	17	5	15	0	50
Riley Price	1	0	0	0	0
Tanner Stowers-Smith	20	0	0	0	0
Makaia Tafua	3	0	0	0	0
Taine Tuaupiki	23	7	31	0	90
Roger Tuivasa-Sheck	10	2	1	0	10
Demitric Vaimauga	22	1	0	0	4
Dallin Watene-Zelezniak	22	20	0	0	80
30 players used	—	130	116	2	754

Goal kickers (top 5)

Rank	Player	Goals	Kick %
1	Tanah Boyd	40 / 53	75.5
2	Taine Tuaupiki	31 / 37	83.8
3	Chanel Harris-Tavita	22 / 32	68.8
4	Adam Pompey	15 / 20	75.0
5	Luke Metcalf	6 / 8	75

Top tacklers (within the top 50 players in the NRL)

Rank	Player	Tackles
1	Wayde Egan	776
2	Jacob Laban	735
3	James Fisher-Harris	699
4	Erin Clark	693

== End of season awards ==
=== New Zealand Warriors awards ===
One New Zealand Warriors 2026 awards
Award	Winner
Jersey Flegg Cup Emerging Player of the Year	Tyson Hansen
Jersey Flegg Cup Team Man of the Year	Maui Winitana-Patelesio
Jersey Flegg Cup Player of the Year	Joseph Ratcliffe
New South Wales Cup Team Man of the Year	Jaydee Auloa
New South Wales Cup Players’ Player of the Year	Makaia Tafua
New South Wales Cup Player of the Year	Kayliss Fatialofa
One New Zealand NRL People's Choice	Erin Clark
One New Zealand NRL Rookie of the Year	Eddie Ieremia-Toeava
NRL Clubman of the Year	Roger Tuivasa-Sheck
NRL Players’ Player of the Year	Jacob Laban
Simon Mannering Medal	James Fisher-Harris

=== Dally M Awards ===
2026 Dally M Awards
Award	Player/Coach	Outcome
Captain of the Year Award	James Fisher-Harris	Winner
Coach of the Year Award	Andrew Webster	Winner
Tackle of the Year Award	Taine Tuaupiki	Winner
Hooker of the Year Award	Wayde Egan	Winner
Prop of the Year Award	James Fisher-Harris	Winner
Lock of the Year Award	Erin Clark	Winner

== See also ==
- List of New Zealand Warriors seasons
- New Zealand Warriors Women
