= 2026 NRL Pre-season Challenge =

- Duration: 7 – 22 February 2026
- Teams: 16
- Premiers: Parramatta Eels (1st title)
- Matches played: 16
- Points scored: 823

The 2026 NRL Pre-season Challenge of the National Rugby League was played from 7 to 22 February 2026, before a 7-day lead up until the beginning of the 2026 NRL season.

Parramatta Eels claimed the A$100,000 prize for finishing atop the ladder at the end of the competition.

== Background ==
The Brisbane Broncos did not participate in the Pre-season Challenge as they were in the United Kingdom contesting the 2026 World Club Challenge.

== Standings ==
The winner of the Pre-season Challenge receives $100,000 AUD. Twelve competition points are awarded for a win and six for a draw. One bonus competition point is awarded for each of the following: 5 or more tries, 5 or more line breaks, and 10 or more offloads.

| Pos | Team | Pld | W | D | L | PF | PA | PD | BP | Pts |
|---|---|---|---|---|---|---|---|---|---|---|
| 1 | Parramatta Eels | 2 | 2 | 0 | 0 | 68 | 28 | +40 | 6 | 30 |
| 2 | Gold Coast Titans | 2 | 2 | 0 | 0 | 66 | 24 | +42 | 5 | 29 |
| 3 | Wests Tigers | 2 | 2 | 0 | 0 | 68 | 38 | +30 | 5 | 29 |
| 4 | North Queensland Cowboys | 2 | 2 | 0 | 0 | 100 | 54 | +46 | 3 | 27 |
| 5 | South Sydney Rabbitohs | 2 | 2 | 0 | 0 | 58 | 30 | +28 | 3 | 27 |
| 6 | Canterbury-Bankstown Bulldogs | 2 | 1 | 0 | 1 | 58 | 34 | +24 | 4 | 16 |
| 7 | Dolphins | 2 | 1 | 0 | 1 | 50 | 58 | −8 | 4 | 16 |
| 8 | Cronulla-Sutherland Sharks | 2 | 1 | 0 | 1 | 54 | 46 | +8 | 3 | 15 |
| 9 | St. George Illawarra Dragons | 2 | 1 | 0 | 1 | 52 | 46 | +6 | 3 | 15 |
| 10 | Canberra Raiders | 2 | 1 | 0 | 1 | 38 | 54 | −16 | 3 | 15 |
| 11 | Manly Warringah Sea Eagles | 2 | 1 | 0 | 1 | 39 | 48 | −9 | 2 | 14 |
| 12 | Sydney Roosters | 2 | 0 | 0 | 2 | 48 | 70 | −22 | 3 | 3 |
| 13 | New Zealand Warriors | 2 | 0 | 0 | 2 | 52 | 71 | −19 | 2 | 2 |
| 14 | Newcastle Knights | 2 | 0 | 0 | 2 | 18 | 56 | −38 | 2 | 2 |
| 15 | Melbourne Storm | 2 | 0 | 0 | 2 | 18 | 74 | −56 | 1 | 1 |
| 16 | Penrith Panthers | 2 | 0 | 0 | 2 | 36 | 92 | −56 | 0 | 0 |

Updated to match(es) played on 22 February 2026. Source: NRL.com

== Fixtures ==
=== First week ===
| Saturday, 7 February | Canterbury-Bankstown Bulldogs | 30–34 | North Queensland Cowboys | Jubilee Stadium, Sydney |
| 16:30 AEST (UTC+10:00) | Tries: Matamua 37'; Fitzgibbon 46'; Toy 57'; Grossemy 63'; Rauqe 66'; Nassar 77'; Goals: Sua 38' (1/3); Fitzgibbon 67', 78' (2/3) | Report | Tries: Luki 5'; Derby 15', 21'; Laybutt 17'; O'Donnell 26'; Barber 75'; Goals: Clifford 7', 19', 23', 28' (4/5); Sutton 75' (1/1) | Attendance: 3,926; Referee: Liam Kennedy |

| Saturday, 7 February | St. George Illawarra Dragons | 28–18 | Newcastle Knights | Jubilee Stadium, Sydney |
| 18:30 AEST (UTC+10:00) | Tries: Reed 12'; Tu 23'; Kerr 49'; Feagai 69'; Buchanan 75'; Sloan 77'; Goals: Reed 13', 25' (2/5); O'Neill (0/0) | Report | Tries: McCarthy 16'; Jones 27'; Schiller 31'; Cant 64'; Goals: Cant 66' (1/1); Smith (0/3) | Attendance: 3,926; Referee: Peter Gough |

=== Second week ===
| Thursday, 12 February | Dolphins | 12–24 | Gold Coast Titans | Kayo Stadium, Redcliffe |
| 19:00 AEST (UTC+10:00) | Tries: Flegler 50'; Garton 55'; Goals: Bowles 52', 56' (2/2) | Report | Tries: Ilias 9'; Fotuaika 12'; Ieremia 66'; Steinwede 69'; Morrin 77'; Goals: Harrison 14' (3/4); Baira 78' (1/1); Sin bin: De Groot (yellow card) 46' to 56' | Attendance: 10,023; Referee: Wyatt Raymond |

| Friday, 13 February | Canberra Raiders | 32–6 | Melbourne Storm | Seiffert Oval, Queanbeyan |
| 16:30 AEST (UTC+10:00) | Tries: Asomua 18', 35'; Innes 44'; Finau 50', 77'; Afamasaga 53'; Kris 67'; Goals: Alaia 54' (1/3); Stewart 69' (1/3); Darmody (0/1); Sin bin: Tuialii (yellow card) 71' to 80' | Report | Tries: Williams 72'; Goals: Murgha 54' (1/1) | Attendance: 7,310; Referee: Ziggy Przeklasa-Adamski |

| Friday, 13 February | North Queensland Cowboys | 66–24 | Penrith Panthers | BB Print Stadium, Mackay |
| 19:00 AEST (UTC+10:00) | Tries: Burns 2', 13'; Purdue 5'; Drinkwater 11'; Clifford 21', 32'; Luki 35'; Taulagi 40'; O'Donnell 52', 60', 64'; Mikaele 78'; Goals: Drinkwater 7', 12', 15', 22', 36', 40' (6/8); Sutton 53' (1/1); Clifford 61', 79' (2/3); Sin bin: Laybutt (yellow card) 26' to 36' | Report | Tries: McLean 42'; Liddiard 67'; Skipps 70', 76'; Goals: Falls 43' (1/1); Clarke 68', 72', 77' (3/3) | Referee: Jarrod Cole |

| Saturday, 14 February | New Zealand Warriors | 18–33 | Manly Warringah Sea Eagles | McLean Park, Napier |
| 12:40 AEST (UTC+10:00) | Tries: Leiataua 4', 38'; Tauafiafi-Iutoi 71'; Tafua 75'; Goals: Boyd 40' (1/2); Norris (0/1); Inch (0/1) | Report | Tries: Bryan 10'; Hart 30', 43'; Faulalo 34'; Wilson 58'; Muagututia 78'; Goals: Wakeham 11', 32', 59', 79' (4/6); Drop goals: Walsh 80' (1/1) | Attendance: 13,575; Referee: Ashley Klein |

| Saturday, 14 February | Wests Tigers | 42–26 | Sydney Roosters | McDonald Jones Stadium, Newcastle |
| 14:50 AEST (UTC+10:00) | | Report | | Attendance: 8,358; Referee: Kieren Irons |

| Saturday, 14 February | Newcastle Knights | 0–28 | Canterbury-Bankstown Bulldogs | McDonald Jones Stadium, Newcastle |
| 17:00 AEST (UTC+10:00) | | 1st: 0–16; 2nd: 0–12; Report | Tries: Sua 15'; Burton 19'; Salmon 33'; Kikau 64'; Toy 74'; Goals: Crichton 2/3 21', 35' O'Sullivan 2/2 65', 75' | Attendance: 8,358; Referee: Liam Kennedy |

| Saturday, 14 February | St. George Illawarra Dragons | 24–28 | South Sydney Rabbitohs | WIN Stadium, Wollongong |
| 19:10 AEST (UTC+10:00) | | Report | | Referee: Gerard Sutton |

| Sunday, 15 February | Cronulla-Sutherland Sharks | 6–40 | Parramatta Eels | Henson Park, Sydney |
| 17:00 AEST (UTC+10:00) | | Report | | Attendance: 8,972; Referee: Tyson Brough |

=== Third week ===
| Friday, 20 February | New Zealand Warriors | 34–38 | Dolphins | Leichhardt Oval, Sydney |
| 17:00 AEST (UTC+10:00) | Tries: Ford 4'; Egan 24'; Watene-Zelezniak 36', 58'; Leiataua 54'; Ieremia-Toeava 60'; Goals: Boyd 6', 26', 37', 55' (4/5); Tuaupiki 62' (1/1); Sin bin: Ford (yellow card) 12' to 22' | Report | Tries: Cobbo 9'; Schneider 19'; Fuller 42'; Isaako 46'; Naufahu 69'; Fineanganofo 72'; Pouniu 75'; Goals: Isaako 20', 44' (2/4); Schneider 70', 73', 76' (3/3); Sin bin: Molo (yellow card) 53' to 63' | Referee: Grant Atkins |

| Friday, 20 February | Wests Tigers | 26–12 | Penrith Panthers | Leichhardt Oval, Sydney |
| 19:10 AEST (UTC+10:00) | | Report | | Referee: Ashley Klein |

| Saturday, 21 February | Cronulla-Sutherland Sharks | 48–6 | Canberra Raiders | polytec Stadium, Gosford |
| 14:50 AEST (UTC+11:00) | | Report | | Referee: Gerard Sutton |

| Saturday, 21 February | Sydney Roosters | 22–28 | Parramatta Eels | polytec Stadium, Gosford |
| 17:00 AEST (UTC+10:00) | | Report | | Referee: Wyatt Raymond |

| Saturday, 21 February | Melbourne Storm | 12–42 | Gold Coast Titans | Sunshine Coast Stadium, Sunshine Coast |
| 19:10 AEST (UTC+10:00) | | Report | | Attendance: 10,062; Referee: Peter Gough |

| Sunday, 22 February | South Sydney Rabbitohs | 30–6 | Manly Sea Eagles | Glen Willow Oval, Mudgee |
| 15:00 AEST (UTC+10:00) | | Report | | Referee: Todd Smith |

== See also ==
- 2026 NRL season
- 2026 NRL season results
