= NRL Schoolboy Cup =

Australian youth rugby league competition

- Sport: Rugby league
- Instituted: 1975
- Country: Australia (Australian Rugby League Commission)
- Holders: Wavell State High School (2026)
- Most titles: St Gregory's College, Campbelltown (9 titles)
- Website: GIO Schoolboy Cup website
- Broadcast partner: 9Gem Final Only

The NRL Schoolboy Cup is the premier secondary schools rugby league competition in Australia, held annually since 1975. Formerly known under such names as the Amco Shield, Commonwealth Bank Cup, Arrive Alive Cup and GIO Schoolboy Cup nearly 450 schools from throughout Australia compete in the knock-out competition.

The player of the tournament is awarded the Peter Sterling Medal, renamed in 1996 after Peter Sterling, who won the medal in 1978, for Patrician Brothers' College, Fairfield. The competition is televised on Nine Network and The Daily Telegraph.

The most successful school is St Gregory's College, Campbelltown, with nine titles, followed by Patrician Brothers' College, Fairfield with six.

== History ==
The competition was founded in 1975 as the Amco Shield. The inaugural winners were Patrician Brothers' College, Fairfield who defeated Blacktown High School in the final, 16–8. The match was played at Leichhardt Oval as a curtain raiser to the 1975 Amco Cup final between Eastern Suburbs and Parramatta.

Originally, the televised matches of the competition were played and recorded as the curtain raisers to mid week Amco Cup games. After the midweek competitions died out, the televised matches were played prior to Friday Night Football and were shown on Channel 9 in the weeks leading up to the NRL Grand Final. The games are currently played and recorded midweek and shown on Fox Sports, with commentary by Andrew Voss.

In 1977, Ashcroft High became the first Co-ed school to win the title playing against Parramatta Marist High School. Playing at Leichhardt Oval, the game was televised on Channel 10, compared by John Brennan and replayed after the Amco Cup Final. Ashcroft took the double by winning the University Shield for the second year in a row.

In 1978, Padua College, Brisbane were the first Queensland school and first school from outside of New South Wales to make the final. They lost 19–3 to Patrician Brothers' College, Fairfield.

In 1980, St Gregory's College, Campbelltown became the first school to win back-to-back titles. They later became the first school to win three titles in a row from 1989 to 1991.

In 1982 Holy Cross College, Ryde became the first school to play in four consecutive finals from 1979. They lost three of their four finals, with their only victory coming against Patrician Brothers' College, Fairfield in 1981.

In 1996, Erindale College, Canberra became the first school from the Australian Capital Territory to reach the final. A year later they became the first school from outside of New South Wales to win the competition. They won the competition again in 1998, beating Parramatta Marist High School in both years.

In 2001, Palm Beach Currumbin State High School became the first Queensland school to win the competition. Brisbane's Wavell State High School became the second a year later in 2002.

In 2003, St Dominic's College, Penrith, brought the Cup back to New South Wales, winning their only title, coincidentally in the same year the Penrith Panthers won the NRL Grand Final. They beat Endeavour Sports High School 28-0.

The following year, Endeavour Sports High School returned to the final and won the competition, winning it three years in a row from 2004 to 2006, becoming the first school to do so since 1991.

In 2015, Townsville's Kirwan State High School became the first school from North Queensland to win the competition, defeating Patrician Brothers' College, Blacktown, who were in their fourth straight final, losing the last three in a row.

In 2016, Westfields Sports High School won the competition for the first time.

In 2017, Keebra Park State High School became first Queensland school to win the competition three times, becoming the most successful school in the state. A year later, Palm Beach Currumbin won their third title, drawing level with Keebra Park. In 2019, Kirwan State High School won the competition for the second time, making it three straight years a Queensland school has won.

In 2020 and 2021, due to the COVID-19 pandemic, no national finals were held for the first time in the competition's history.

In 2022, after a three year absence, the national final returned, with Ipswich State High School defeating Patrician Brothers' College, Fairfield to win their first title.

In 2025, Keebra Park State High School defeated Patrician Brothers' College, Blacktown extending the Blacktown side’s run of heartbreak with an eighth finals defeat and only one victory to show for it.

== Naming rights ==
Due to sponsorship, the Schoolboy Cup has gone under many different names since first being held in 1975. Originally known as the Amco Shield, it has been known as the NRL Schoolboy Cup since 2018.

- Amco Shield (1975–1979)
- Commonwealth Bank Cup (1980–1996)
- Aussie Home Loans Cup (1997–1999)
- Nutri-Grain Cup (2000–2002)
- Arrive Alive Cup (2003–2009)
- National Schoolboy Cup (2010–2011)
- GIO Schoolboy Cup (2012–2017)
- NRL Schoolboy Cup (2018–present)

== Format ==
The competition is divided into two conferences. The Northern Conference, comprising schools from Queensland, is further divided into smaller competitions: the Aaron Payne Cup, the Allan Langer Trophy, and the Dolphin Cup. The winners of these cups compete against each other, with the victor being crowned the Queensland Schoolboy Cup Champion. The Southern Conference, known as the Peter Mulholland Cup, includes schools from New South Wales, the Australian Capital Territory and Victoria. The winners of the Queensland Schoolboy Trophy and the Peter Mulholland Cup then face off in the National Schoolboy Final, with the winner being crowned the National Schoolboy Champion.

Champions by each Season
Season	Champions	Score	Runners-up
1975	Patrician Brothers' College, Fairfield	16–8	Blacktown Boys High School
1976	Blacktown Boys High School	16–7	Ashcroft High School
1977	Ashcroft High School	16–3	Parramatta Marist High School
1978	Patrician Brothers' College, Fairfield	19–3	Padua College, Brisbane
1979	St Gregory's College, Campbelltown	16–14	Holy Cross College, Ryde
1980	St Gregory's College, Campbelltown	11–9	Holy Cross College, Ryde
1981	Holy Cross College, Ryde	15–11	Patrician Brothers' College, Fairfield
1982	Patrician Brothers' College, Fairfield	18–15	Holy Cross College, Ryde
1983	Patrician Brothers' College, Fairfield	14–2	St Gregory's College, Campbelltown
1984	St Gregory's College, Campbelltown	16–10	Christian Brothers' High School, Lewisham
1985	Ashcroft High School	13–6	Patrician Brothers' College, Fairfield
1986	St Gregory's College, Campbelltown	26–0	Christian Brothers' High School, Lewisham
1987	Patrician Brothers' College, Fairfield	21–0	Keebra Park State High School
1988	Parramatta Marist High School	14–6	Holy Cross College, Ryde
1989	St Gregory's College, Campbelltown	12–10	Holy Cross College, Ryde
1990	St Gregory's College, Campbelltown	18–4	St John's College, Woodlawn
1991	St Gregory's College, Campbelltown	28–12	Patrician Brothers' College, Fairfield
1992	Patrician Brothers' College, Fairfield	17–16	Harristown State High School
1993	St Gregory's College, Campbelltown	27–6	Wavell State High School
1994	John Paul II Senior High School, Marayong	34–4	Eagle Vale High School
1995	Parramatta Marist High School	24–0	McCarthy Catholic Senior High School
1996	John Paul II Senior High School, Marayong	12–6	Erindale College, Canberra
1997	Erindale College, Canberra	26–12	Parramatta Marist High School
1998	Erindale College, Canberra	27–14	Parramatta Marist High School
1999	Terra Sancta College	16–14	Palm Beach Currumbin State High School
2000	St Gregory's College, Campbelltown	16–0	St Francis Xavier's College, Hamilton
2001	Palm Beach Currumbin State High School	16–4	St Gregory's College, Campbelltown
2002	Wavell State High School	22–20	Terra Sancta College
2003	St Dominic's College, Penrith	28–0	Endeavour Sports High School
2004	Endeavour Sports High School	16–7	Patrician Brothers' College Blacktown
2005	Endeavour Sports High School	20–10	Keebra Park State High School
2006	Endeavour Sports High School	16–7	Keebra Park State High School
2007	Matraville Sports High School	32–10	Patrician Brothers' College Blacktown
2008	Palm Beach Currumbin State High School	24–22	Matraville Sports High School
2009	Keebra Park State High School	18–12	Matraville Sports High School
2010	The Hills Sports High School	18–14	Keebra Park State High School
2011	The Hills Sports High School	22–20	Matraville Sports High School
2012	Patrician Brothers' College Blacktown	32–6	Endeavour Sports High School
2013	Keebra Park State High School	28–4	Patrician Brothers' College Blacktown
2014	Endeavour Sports High School	22–12	Patrician Brothers' College Blacktown
2015	Kirwan State High School	28–10	Patrician Brothers' College Blacktown
2016	Westfields Sports High School	26–24	Keebra Park State High School
2017	Keebra Park State High School	25–12	Westfields Sports High School
2018	Palm Beach Currumbin State High School	20–12	Patrician Brothers' College Blacktown
2019	Kirwan State High School	16–10	Westfields Sports High School
2022	Ipswich State High School	32–6	Patrician Brothers' College, Fairfield
2023	Westfields Sports High School	38–4	Palm Beach Currumbin State High School
2024	Palm Beach Currumbin State High School	18–16	Patrician Brothers' College, Blacktown
2025	Keebra Park State High School	20-12	Patrician Brothers' College, Blacktown
2026	Wavell State High School	20-12	Endeavour Sports High School

=== Titles ===
No.	School	Location	Titles	Runners-up
1	St Gregory's College	Gregory Hills, New South Wales	1979, 1980, 1984, 1986, 1989, 1990, 1991, 1993, 2000 (9)	1983, 2001 (2)
2	Patrician Brothers' College (Fairfield)	Fairfield, New South Wales	1975, 1978, 1982, 1983, 1987, 1992 (6)	1981, 1985, 1991, 2022 (4)
3	Endeavour Sports High School	Caringbah, New South Wales	2004, 2005, 2006, 2014 (4)	2003, 2012, 2026 (3)
3	Keebra Park State High School	Southport, Queensland	2009, 2013, 2017, 2025 (4)	1987, 2005, 2006, 2010, 2016 (5)
3	Palm Beach Currumbin State High School	Currumbin, Queensland	2001, 2008, 2018, 2024 (4)	1999, 2023 (2)
5	Parramatta Marist High School	Westmead, New South Wales	1988, 1995 (2)	1977, 1997, 1998 (3)
5	Ashcroft High School	Ashcroft, New South Wales	1977, 1985 (2)	1976 (1)
5	Erindale College	Wanniassa, Australian Capital Territory	1997, 1998 (2)	1996 (1)
5	Kirwan State High School	Kirwan, Queensland	2015, 2019 (2)	—
5	St Andrews College	Marayong, New South Wales	1994, 1996 (2)	—
5	The Hills Sports High School	Seven Hills, New South Wales	2010, 2011 (2)	—
5	Wavell State High School	Wavell Heights, Queensland	2002, 2026 (2)	1993 (1)
5	Westfields Sports High School	Fairfield West, New South Wales	2016, 2023 (2)	2017, 2019 (2)
12	Patrician Brothers' College (Blacktown)	Blacktown, New South Wales	2012 (1)	2004, 2007, 2013, 2014, 2015, 2018, 2024, 2025 (8)
12	Holy Cross College	Ryde, New South Wales	1981 (1)	1979, 1980, 1982, 1988, 1989 (5)
12	Matraville Sports High School	Chifley, New South Wales	2007 (1)	2008, 2009, 2011 (3)
12	St John Paul II Catholic College	Nirimba Fields, New South Wales	1999 (1)	2002 (1)
12	Blacktown Boys High School	Blacktown, New South Wales	1976 (1)	1975 (1)
12	Ipswich State High School	Brassall, Queensland	2022 (1)	—
12	St Dominic's College	Penrith, New South Wales	2003 (1)	—

== Peter Sterling Medal ==
The Peter Sterling Medal is awarded to the most outstanding player in the competition. Sterling, one of rugby league's most decorated players, won the award in 1978 while attending Patrician Brothers' College, Fairfield. In 1996, the medal was renamed in his honour.

Season	Player	School
1976	Steve White	Blacktown Boys High School
1977	Alan Emery	Ashcroft High School
1978	Peter Sterling	Patrician Brothers' College, Fairfield
1979	Ivan Henjak	St Gregory's College, Campbelltown
1980	Ben Elias	Holy Cross College, Ryde
1981	Ben Elias	Holy Cross College, Ryde
1982	Paul Langmack	Patrician Brothers' College, Fairfield
1983	Greg Alexander	Patrician Brothers' College, Fairfield
1984	Paul Osborne	Christian Brothers' High School, Lewisham
1985	David Rowles	Ashcroft High School
1986	Damien Kenniff	St Gregory's College, Campbelltown
1987	David Danes	Patrician Brothers' College, Fairfield
1988	David Bayssari	Parramatta Marist High School
1989	Jason Taylor	St Gregory's College, Campbelltown
1990	Troy Dicinoski	St John's College, Woodlawn
1991	Damien Chapman	St Gregory's College, Campbelltown
1992	Andrew Dunemann	Harristown State High School
1993	Kris Flint	St Gregory's College, Campbelltown
1994	Michael Withers	John Paul II Senior High School, Marayong
1995	Nathan Cayless	Parramatta Marist High School
1996	Chris Smith	John Paul II Senior High School, Marayong
1997	Greg Keary	Parramatta Marist High School
1998	Peter Rose	Erindale College
1999	Christian Orsini	Terra Sancta College
2000	Riley Mullins	St Gregory's College, Campbelltown
2001	Mat Brown	Palm Beach Currumbin State High School
2002	Aaron Lewis	Wavell State High School
2003	Michael Carl	St Dominic's College, Penrith
2004	Beau Champion	Endeavour Sports High School
2005	Ben Te'o	Keebra Park State High School
2006	Jack McGhee	St John’s college
2007	Adam Reynolds	Matraville Sports High School
2008	Ryan James	Palm Beach Currumbin State High School
2009	Jordan Kahu	Keebra Park State High School
2010	Gerard McCallum	Hills Sports High School
2011	Kem Seru	Matraville Sports High School
2012	Jaden Clarke	Endeavour Sports High School
2013	Marion Seve	Keebra Park State High School
2014	Joey Tramontana	Patrician Brothers' College Blacktown
2015	Julian Christian	Kirwan State High School
2016	Payne Haas	Keebra Park State High School
2017	David Fifita	Keebra Park State High School
2018	Tom Dearden	Palm Beach Currumbin State High School
2019	Adrian Trevilyan	Kirwan State High School
2020–2021 — Not awarded
2022	Gabriel Satrick	Ipswich State High School
2023	Lachlan Galvin	Westfields Sports High School
2024	Zane Harrison	Palm Beach Currumbin State High School
2025	David Bryenton	Keebra Park State High School
2026	Calvin Harris-Tavita	Wavell State High School

== See also ==
- Australian Schoolboys rugby league team
- Junior Kangaroos
- AFL Queensland Schools Cup
