= St Dominic's College, Penrith =

St Dominic's College

Location
- Penrith; Western Sydney, New South Wales; Australia; 33°45′14″S 150°42′54″E

Information
- Type: Independent secondary day school
- Motto: Latin: Dominus Lux Mea (The Lord is my Light)
- Religious affiliation: Catholicism
- Denomination: Congregation of Christian Brothers
- Patron saint: St Dominic Savio
- Established: 1959; 67 years ago
- Founders: Congregation of Christian Brothers
- Educational authority: New South Wales Department of Education
- Trust: Edmund Rice Education Australia
- Principal: Natalie Devenish
- Years: 7–12
- Gender: Boys
- Enrollment: 1,017
- Campus size: 12.95 ac
- Houses: Dharuk, Rice, Surawski, Tench
- Sports: Rugby League, Association Football, Basketball
- Nickname: Dommies
- Newspaper: The Torch
- School fees: $8,629 - $9,548
- Website: www.stdominics.nsw.edu.au

St Dominic's College is an independent Catholic secondary day school for boys, located in Kingswood, a suburb in Western Sydney, New South Wales, Australia. St. Dominic's College was established in 1959 by the Congregation of Christian Brothers, who continue to run the school.

== Overview ==
The College was originally established at temporary facilities in the old Convent on Evan Street, Penrith in 1959. In 1960, under the direction of Brother Michael Surawski, the school moved to the current campus in Kingswood.

Between 1978 and 1985, years 11 and 12 (the most senior years) at the college were co-educational. With the establishment of McCarthy Catholic College, Emu Plains, however, the college returned to being an all-boys school. Currently, more than 1000 students from across Greater Western Sydney attend the college.

In 2025, the college recorded 25 Band 6/E4 results by the graduating Year 12 cohort, their highest of the decade thus far.

Year 8-10 students are now studying Japanese, with senior students currently able to study either Japanese or Italian.

The school's TAS Department is state-of-the-art, with multiple 3D printers, woodwork and metalwork workshops. The school provides qualified tutors for students.

The school won their first and only NRL Schoolboy Cup in 2003over Endeavour Sports High School 28-0.

== Notable alumni ==
=== Rugby League ===
- Greg Alexander
- Ben Alexander
- Mitchell Allgood
- Blake Austin
- Tas Baitieri
- Zac Cini
- Nathan Cleary
- Jett Cleary
- Geoff Daniela
- Kurt Falls
- Brad Fittler
- Mavrik Geyer
- Jordan Grant
- Luke Hanson
- Keagan Russell-Smith
- Liam Ison
- Riley Pollard
- Ryley Smith
- Brendan Hands
- Shawn Blore
- Jaxen Edgar
- Des Hasler
- Willie Isa
- Michael Jennings
- Joseph Chan
- Clay Priest
- Luke Rooney
- Tim Sheens
- McConkie Tauasa
- Mason Teague
- Steve Turner
- Joe Vitanza
- Dallin Watene-Zelezniak
- Malakai Watene-Zelezniak
- Graham Kennedy – New Zealand national rugby league team captain; principal of the college from 1994 to 2002

=== Basketball ===
- Akoldah Gak
- Nic Pozoglou
- Jasper Rentoy

=== Association Football ===
- Luke Casserly
- Nicolas Milanovic

=== Australian Rules Football ===
- Michael Hartley
- Jake Stein

=== Other ===
- Dominic Purcell – actor in Prison Break
- Tai Tuivasa – UFC star
- Stuart Ayres – former Member for Penrith
- Cameron Clyne – Chairman for Rugby Australia

== See also ==
- List of Catholic schools in New South Wales
- Catholic education in Australia
