= Glenmore Park Brumbies =

Australian rugby league club, based near Sydney, NSW

Club information
- Full name: Glenmore Park Brumbies Rugby League Football Club
- Nickname: Brumbies
- Colours: Gold; Maroon
- Founded: 1994; 32 years ago

Current details
- Ground: Ched Towns Reserve, Glenmore Park
- Competition: Penrith District Rugby League

The Glenmore Park Brumbies is an Australian rugby league club. It was formed in 1994 and currently fields male and female teams in all junior grades of the Penrith District Rugby League. The club is based at Ched Towns Reserve in Glenmore Park, New South Wales.

== Notable Juniors ==
- Tony Satini (2014 Manly Sea Eagles)
- Danny Levi (2015- Newcastle Knights)
- Sione Katoa (2015-21 Penrith Panthers)
- Sarah Togatuki (2018- Sydney Roosters)
- Sean O’Sullivan (2018- Sydney Roosters)
- Shaylee Bent (2019- Dragons & Gold Coast Titans)
- Joseph Suaalii (2021-24 Sydney Roosters)
- Jayden Campbell (2021- Gold Coast Titans)
- Isaiya Katoa (2023- Redcliffe Dolphins)
- Luke Hanson (2026- New Zealand Warriors)
- Jett Cleary (2026- New Zealand Warriors)

== See also ==
- List of rugby league clubs in Australia
- Rugby league in New South Wales
