= Alofiana Khan-Pereira =

Australian rugby league footballer

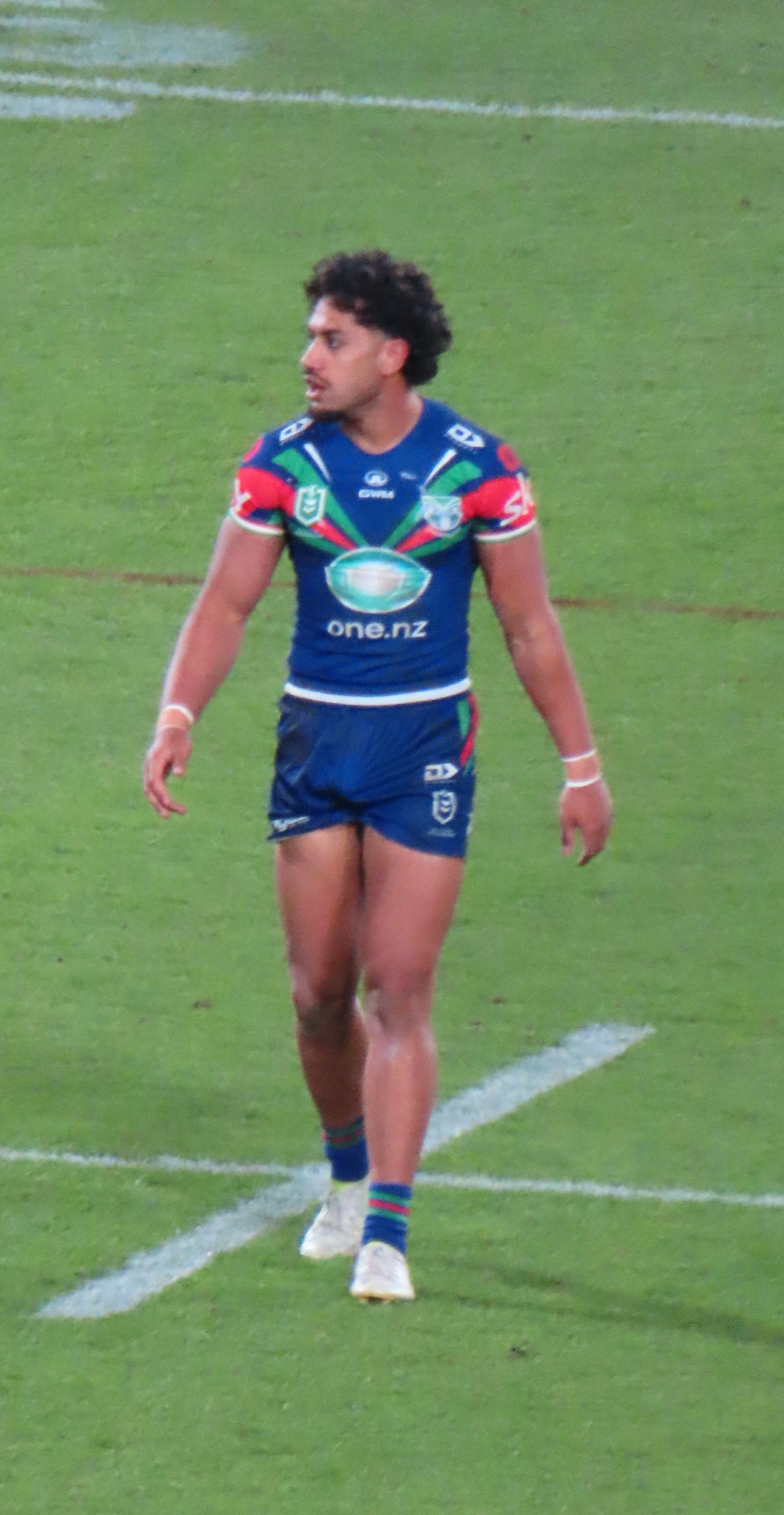
- Khan-Pereira playing for the Warriors in 2026.

Personal information
- Full name: Alofiana Khan-Pereira
- Born: 1 November 2001 (age 25) Lismore, New South Wales, Australia
- Height: 183 cm (6 ft 0 in)
- Weight: 85 kg (13 st 5 lb)

Playing information
- Position: Wing
Club
Years	Team	Pld	T	G	FG	P
2023–25	Gold Coast Titans	54	53	0	0	212
2026–	New Zealand Warriors	19	16	0	0	64
	Total	73	69	0	0	276
Representative
Years	Team	Pld	T	G	FG	P
2023–24	Prime Minister's XIII	2	2	0	0	8
2024–25	Indigenous All Stars	2	1	0	0	4
- Source: As of 20 September 2026

Alofiana Khan-Pereira (born 1 November 2001) is an Australian professional rugby league footballer who plays as a winger for the New Zealand Warriors in the National Rugby League.

== Background ==
Khan-Pereira was born in Lismore, New South Wales. His mother is Indigenous Australian and Pakistani while his father is of Samoan and Māori descent. His mother Sylvia has roots from the Bundjalung people. He moved to the Gold Coast at nine years of age where he attended rugby league nursery Keebra Park State High School and played junior rugby league for the Burleigh Bears. Khan-Pereira is eligible to represent Queensland in State of Origin.

== Playing career ==
=== Early career ===
In 2016, Khan-Pereira was a part of the GIO Cup winning Keebra Park team alongside future Titans teammates Tanah Boyd and David Fifita. In 2018, Khan-Pereira signed a development contract with the Gold Coast Titans.

In 2022, Khan-Pereira enjoyed a breakout Queensland Cup season for the Burleigh Bears, scoring 25 tries in just 19 games including three hat-tricks and a four-try effort against the Mackay Cutters.

=== 2023 ===
Khan-Pereira's efforts of the previous season were noticed by Gold Coast Titans coach Justin Holbrook who brought him into the Gold Coast Titans side and underwent pre-season training with their first grade team. In a trial match against the Dolphins, Khan-Pereira scored four tries.

In round 1 of the 2023 NRL season, Khan-Pereira made his first grade debut in his side's 22–10 victory over the Wests Tigers at Leichhardt Oval. In round 3, Khan-Pereira scored two tries for Gold Coast in their 38–34 upset victory over the Melbourne Storm at Robina Stadium. In round 7, Khan-Pereira scored two tries for the Gold Coast in their 43–26 loss against the Brisbane Broncos in the South East Queensland derby. In round 9, Khan-Pereira scored two tries for the Gold Coast in a 26–10 upset victory over the Manly Warringah Sea Eagles. The following week, Khan-Pereira scored two tries for the Gold Coast in their 26–24 victory over Parramatta. In round 20, Khan-Pereira scored two tries for the Gold Coast in their narrow 25–24 loss against Parramatta. Khan-Pereira became the first player at the Titans to score 20 tries in a season.

=== 2024 ===
In round 16, Khan-Pereira equaled a club try record for a single game set by Jordan Atkins in 2008 by scoring four in the Gold Coast's 66–6 win against the New Zealand Warriors. It was also the biggest victory by the Gold Coast Titans in their history and the biggest win by any of Gold Coast team since the first one entered the competition in 1988. In round 21, he scored two tries in Gold Coast's comeback victory over the Dolphins. In round 25, Khan-Periera scored a hat-trick in the Gold Coast's 48–22 loss against the Sydney Roosters. He played 21 games for the Gold Coast throughout the 2024 NRL season as the club finished 14th on the table. Khan-Pereira finished as the top of the competition try scorer for the year with 24 tries. As the top try scorer, he is the first player to win top try scorer for any Gold Coast franchise in history.

=== 2025 ===
In round 2 of the 2025 NRL season, Khan-Pereira scored two tries for the Gold Coast in their 40–24 loss against Canterbury. He was limited to only ten matches for the Gold Coast in the 2025 NRL season as the club narrowly avoided the wooden spoon finishing 16th on the table. On 11 October 2025, it was reported that Khan-Pereira had signed a three -year deal with the New Zealand Warriors. On 13 October, the New Zealand Warriors confirmed the signing of Khan-Pereira until the end of 2028.

=== 2026 ===
Khan-Pereira made his debut for the New Zealand Warriors in round 6 of the 2026 NRL season against the Melbourne Storm. The New Zealand Warriors won the match 38–14 win, breaking a 17-match losing streak against the Melbourne Storm. In round 7, Khan-Pereira scored his first two tries for the club in a 28–20 victory against his former club Gold Coast Titans. He played 19 games for the New Zealand Warriors in the 2026 NRL season and scored 16 tries as the club finished second on the table but were eliminated from the finals in straight sets.

== Statistics ==
Year	Team	Games	Tries	Pts
2023	Gold Coast Titans	23	20	80
2024	Gold Coast Titans	21	24	96
2025	Gold Coast Titans	10	9	36
2026	New Zealand Warriors	19	16	64
2027	New Zealand Warriors			
	Totals	73	69	276
