= Riley Pollard =

Australian rugby league footballer (born 2005)

Personal information
- Born: 25 August 2005 (age 21) Penrith, Sydney, Australia
- Height: 177 cm (5 ft 10 in)
- Weight: 83 kg (13 st 1 lb)

Playing information
- Position: Halfback, Five-eighth
Club
Years	Team	Pld	T	G	FG	P
2026–	Cronulla Sharks	1	0	0	0	0
- Source: RLP

Riley Pollard (born 25 August 2005) is an Australian professional rugby league footballer for the Cronulla Sharks in the National Rugby League (NRL).

== Early life ==
Born in Sydney, Pollard was educated at St Dominic's College in Penrith and played halfback for the Australian Schoolboys in 2023, forming a halves partnership with Lachie Galvin.

Pollard is a product of the Penrith Panthers junior pathways, playing for local sides Brothers and Colyton Colts during his youth, and is a former national representative in touch football, appearing at the Asia Pacific Youth Touch Cup.

== Career ==
Pollard joined the Cronulla Sharks in 2024 and was a member of that year's Jersey Flegg side which reached the grand final. He advanced to the NSW Cup in 2025 with the Newtown Jets.

In the final round of the 2026 NRL season, Pollard made his first-grade debut against the Melbourne Storm playing as a five-eighth. He subsequently signed a contract extension through to the end of their 2028 campaign.
