= Jaxen Edgar =

Australian rugby league footballer (born 2006)

Personal information
- Born: 10 January 2006 (age 20) Penrith, New South Wales, Australia

Playing information
- Position: Fullback
Club
Years	Team	Pld	T	G	FG	P
2025–	Penrith Panthers	4	2	0	0	8
- Source: RLP

Jaxen Edgar (born 10 January 2006) is an Australian rugby league footballer for the Penrith Panthers in the National Rugby League (NRL).

== Early life ==
Edgar was born and raised in Penrith, attending the local St Dominic's College. As one his schoolmates was Jett Cleary, with whom he had played OzTag as an eight-year-old, Edgar has known Panthers coach Ivan Cleary from a young age. He was a 2023 Australian Schoolboys representative and played juniors for Penrith Brothers.

== Career ==
A fullback, Edgar came up through the Penrith junior sides and late in the 2025 NRL season made his first-grade debut, when he came on off the bench to play for six minutes against Canterbury-Bankstown. He got more game-time the following season, with three NRL appearances as the starting fullback, while Dylan Edwards was unavailable. At the end of season awards, Edgar was named "NSW Cup Player of the Year", for his contribution to their premiership-winning team. He is signed by Penrith through to the end of the 2028 season.
