= Arama Hau =

Australian rugby league player

Personal information
- Born: 27 August 2004 (age 22)
- Height: 191 cm (6 ft 3 in)
- Weight: 107 kg (16 st 12 lb)

Playing information
- Position: Second-row, Prop, Lock
Club
Years	Team	Pld	T	G	FG	P
2023	Featherstone Rovers	10	9	0	0	36
2024–	Gold Coast Titans	29	8	0	0	32
	Total	39	17	0	0	68
- Source: As of 4 September 2026

Arama Hau (born 27 August 2004) is an Australian rugby league footballer who plays as a second-row for the Gold Coast Titans in the National Rugby League.

He previously played for Featherstone Rovers in the RFL Championship.

== Background ==
Hau is of Maori/Tongan descent. He played his junior rugby league for the Nerang Roosters and attended Keebra Park State High School, where he represented the Australian Schoolboys in 2022, before being signed by the Gold Coast Titans.

== Playing career ==
=== Early career ===
Hau played in the Burleigh Bears junior representative system, playing for their Mal Meninga Cup side in 2021 and 2022 and their Hastings Deering Colts side in 2022.

=== 2023 ===
In February 2023, Hau was a member of the Queensland Under-19 Emerging Origin squad.

On 6 May, Hau joined the Featherstone Rovers on loan until the end of the 2023 season.

He made his debut in Round 11 of the 2023 RFL Championship season, coming off the bench in a 30–0 win over the Widnes Vikings. He played 10 games in his season at Featherstone, starting eight at second-row and scoring nine tries.

=== 2024 ===
Hau began the 2024 season playing for the Ipswich Jets in the Queensland Cup.

In Round 27 of the 2024 NRL season, he made his NRL debut in a 18–12 loss to the Penrith Panthers.

=== 2025 ===
In Round 14 of the 2025 NRL season, he scored his first NRL try in a 44–14 loss to the Brisbane Broncos.

=== 2026 ===
On 15 May, the Gold Coast Titans announced that Hau had re-signed with the club until the end of 2028.
