= Chanel Harris-Tavita =

Samoa international rugby league footballer

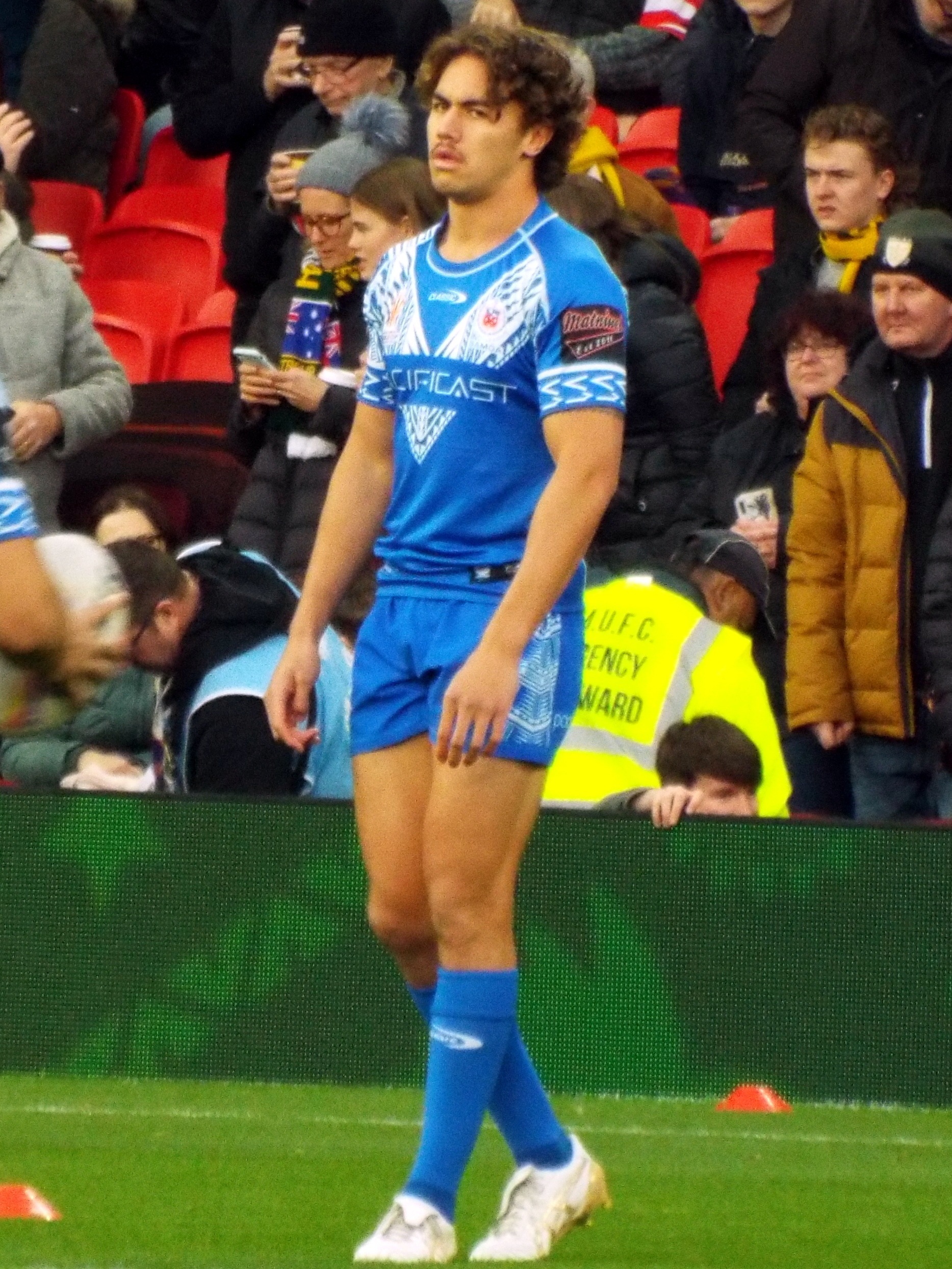

Personal information
- Full name: Chanel Harris-Tavita
- Born: 3 April 1999 (age 27) Auckland, New Zealand
- Height: 183 cm (6 ft 0 in)
- Weight: 89 kg (14 st 0 lb)

Playing information
- Position: Five-eighth, Halfback
Club
Years	Team	Pld	T	G	FG	P
2019–	New Zealand Warriors	117	27	85	2	280
Representative
Years	Team	Pld	T	G	FG	P
2019–	Samoa	13	6	2	0	28
2022	Māori All Stars	1	0	0	0	0
- Source: As of 20 November 2026

Chanel Harris-Tavita (born 3 April 1999) is a professional rugby league footballer who plays as a five-eighth or halfback for the New Zealand Warriors in the National Rugby League (NRL). He has played for the Māori All Stars and Samoa at representative level.

== Background ==
Harris-Tavita was born in Auckland, New Zealand and is of Samoan and Māori descent. He attended Pakūranga College from 2012 to 2016. His grandfather Ray Harris represented New Zealand Maori and Auckland. His younger brother Calvin Harris-Tavita is a highly rated junior in the Brisbane Broncos academy.

== Playing career ==
=== 2016–2018 ===
Harris-Tavita played his junior rugby league for the Mount Wellington Warriors, Howick Hornets, and Pakuranga Jaguars. He entered the New Zealand Warriors development system during his teenage years. On 3 April 2016, his 17th birthday, he made his debut for the club's Under-20 National Youth Competition (NYC) team, becoming the youngest player in the club's history to do so. He went on to win the club's NYC Rookie of the Year award later that season.

In 2017, Harris-Tavita transitioned into full-time football and was named the New Zealand Warriors 2017 NYC player of the year, receiving the Sonny Fai Medal after appearing in 21 games, scoring six tries, and recording 10 try assists.

After two seasons in the under-20 grade, was moved up to develop his game in the Intrust Super Premiership in 2018.

=== 2019–2020 ===
In round 4 of the 2019 NRL season, Harris-Tavita made his NRL debut against the Gold Coast Titans. He was viewed as Shaun Johnson long-term replacement, who signed with the Cronulla-Sutherland Sharks in late 2018.

He made 13 appearances for the New Zealand Warriors in both of the 2019 and 2020 seasons as the club missed out on the finals.

=== 2021 ===
In round 9 of the 2021 NRL season, he scored two tries in a 38–32 loss against Manly-Warringah. He made a total of 11 appearances for the club which saw New Zealand once again miss out on the finals.

=== 2022 ===
Following New Zealand's record 70–10 loss to Melbourne in round 8 of the 2022 NRL season, it was revealed that Harris-Tavita suffered a ruptured testicle during the game which required surgery. Harris-Tavita was then ruled out from playing indefinitely. In May 2022, Harris-Tavita announced he was taking a hiatus from rugby league at the end of the season. Harris-Tavita cited that he had lost the passion for playing the game and was going to spend his time traveling and writing.

In October Harris-Tavita was named in the Samoa squad for the 2021 Rugby League World Cup. Harris-Tavita played for Samoa in their Rugby League World Cup final loss to Australia. During the second half, Harris-Tavita was knocked out after being hit in the head by Australia's Angus Crichton. Harris-Tavita played no further part in the match.

=== 2023 ===
After the World Cup the previous year, Harris-Tavita travelled Europe as part of his hiatus from rugby league. In May 2023, it was announced Harris-Tavita would return to the New Zealand Warriors, signing a two-year deal from 2024.

=== 2024 ===
He played 17 games for the New Zealand Warriors in the 2024 NRL season which saw the club finish 13th on the table. On 15 October 2024, it was announced that Harris-Tavita would re-sign with the club for another two years.

=== 2025 ===
He played 24 games with New Zealand in the 2025 NRL season as the club finished 6th on the table and qualified for the finals. They were eliminated by Penrith in the first week of the finals.

=== 2026 ===
On 21 May, New Zealand Warriors confirmed that Harris-Tavita had re-signed with the club for a further year. On 18 August, Harris-Tavita extended his contract again until the end of 2029.

== Statistics ==
As of 18 August 2026.

=== NRL ===
Season	Team	Matches	Tries	Goals	Field Goals	Kicking Percentage	Pts
2019	New Zealand Warriors	13	2	24 / 29	—	82.76	56
2020	New Zealand Warriors	13	2	27 / 34	—	79.41	62
2021	New Zealand Warriors	11	2	—	1	—	9
2022	New Zealand Warriors	17	1	1 / 1	—	100	6
2024	New Zealand Warriors	17	4	11 / 18	—	61.11	38
2025	New Zealand Warriors	24	8	—	—	—	32
2026	New Zealand Warriors	22	8	22	1	—	77
2027	New Zealand Warriors						
Career totals		117	27	85	2	76.83	280
