= Marion Seve =

Samoa international rugby league footballer

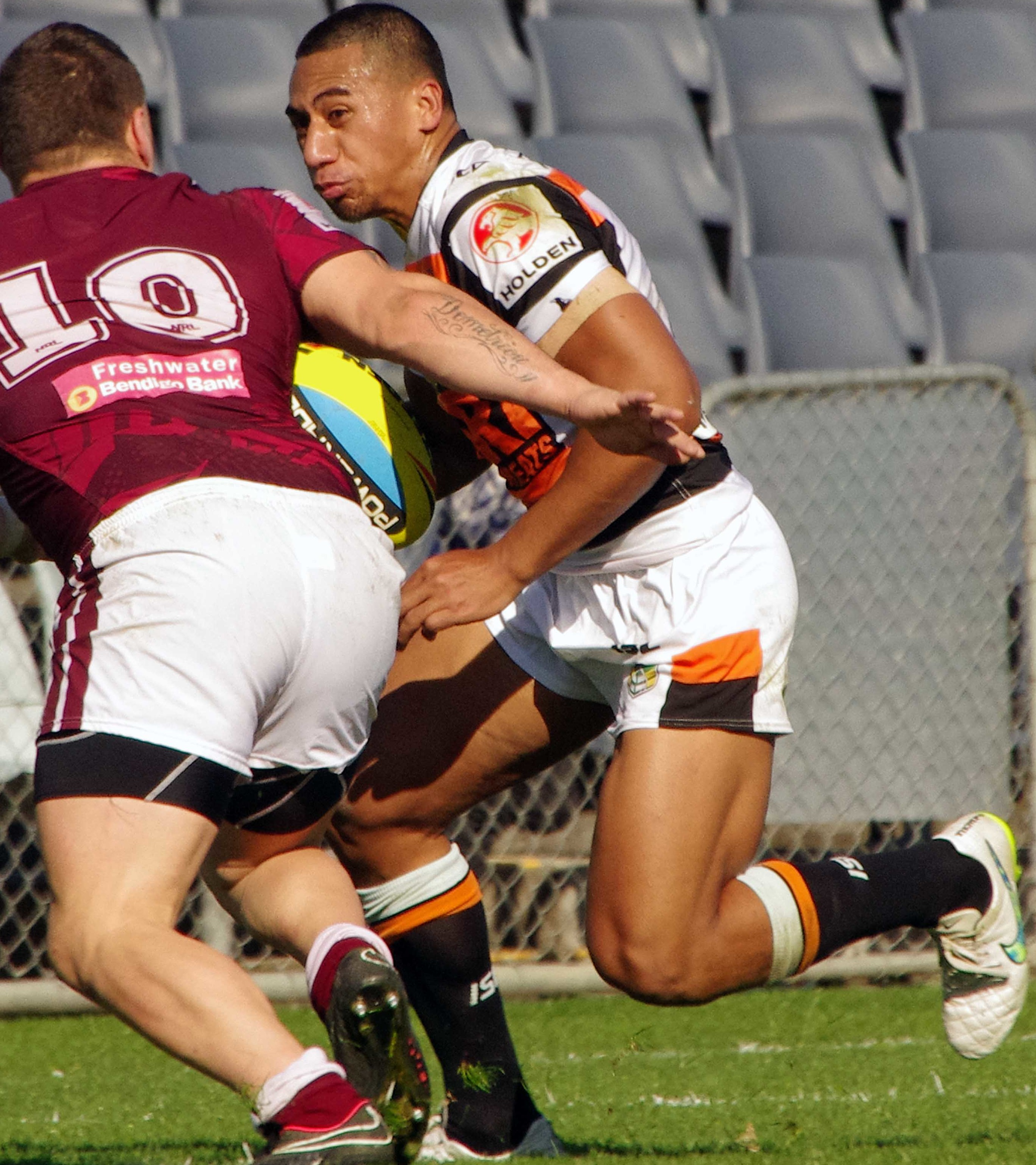

Personal information
- Born: 27 May 1995 (age 31) Ipswich, Queensland, Australia
- Height: 180 cm (5 ft 11 in)
- Weight: 92 kg (14 st 7 lb)

Playing information
- Position: Centre
Club
Years	Team	Pld	T	G	FG	P
2019–26	Melbourne Storm	52	13	0	0	52
Representative
Years	Team	Pld	T	G	FG	P
2018	Queensland Residents	1	0	0	0	0
2019–23	Samoa	3	0	0	0	0
2019	Samoa 9s	4	3	0	0	13
- Source: As of 27 August 2026

Marion Seve (born 27 May 1995) is a former Samoa international rugby league footballer who played as a centre for the Melbourne Storm in the National Rugby League (NRL).

== Early life ==
Seve was born in Ipswich, Queensland, Australia. He is one of seven children of a Samoan boxer. Seve was educated at St Peter Claver College, Ipswich and then educated at Keebra Park State High School, Gold Coast, where he was the recipient of the Peter Sterling Medal after winning the 2013 GIO Schoolboy Cup. He was also a 2013 Australian Schoolboys representative.

Marion played his junior rugby league for Ipswich Brothers and played representative football with Wests Tigers until 2016 where he signed with the Brisbane Broncos.

In 2018, Seve signed with the Melbourne Storm mid season.

== Playing career ==
In Round 2 of the 2019 NRL season, Seve made his debut for Melbourne against Canberra. He had his Melbourne jersey presented to him by Melbourne head coach Craig Bellamy. Seve mid season was named in the Toa Samoa team to make his international debut. During the post-season, he was named in the Samoan team to contest the 2019 Rugby League World Cup 9s. Seve made seven appearances for Melbourne in the 2020 NRL season but did not play in the club's finals campaign or grand final victory over Penrith. Seve played two games for Melbourne in the 2021 NRL season scoring two tries but did not play in the club's finals series where they lost to eventual premiers Penrith in the preliminary final.

After receiving Melbourne's most improved player award in 2022, Seve played ten games for Melbourne in the 2023 NRL season including all three finals matches as the club lost against Penrith in the preliminary final. He was later added to the Samoa squad for the 2023 Pacific Rugby League Championships, playing his first international match since 2019.

In June 2025, Seve suffered a serious eye injury playing for Melbourne’s feeder club the North Sydney Bears. After being told that further blows to his eye could lead to loss of vision, Seve returned to the first grade team in August of the same year, becoming the first NRL player to wear sports goggles during a match.

On 7 September 2026, Seve announced his retirement from the NRL.

== Statistics ==
Year	Team	Games	Tries	Pts
2019	Melbourne Storm	12	4	16
2020	Melbourne Storm	7		
2021	Melbourne Storm	2	2	8
2022	Melbourne Storm	15	3	12
2023	Melbourne Storm	10	3	12
2024	Melbourne Storm	1		
2025	Melbourne Storm	4	1	4
2026	Melbourne Storm	1		
	Totals	52	13	52
