= Taine Tuaupiki =

New Zealand rugby league footballer

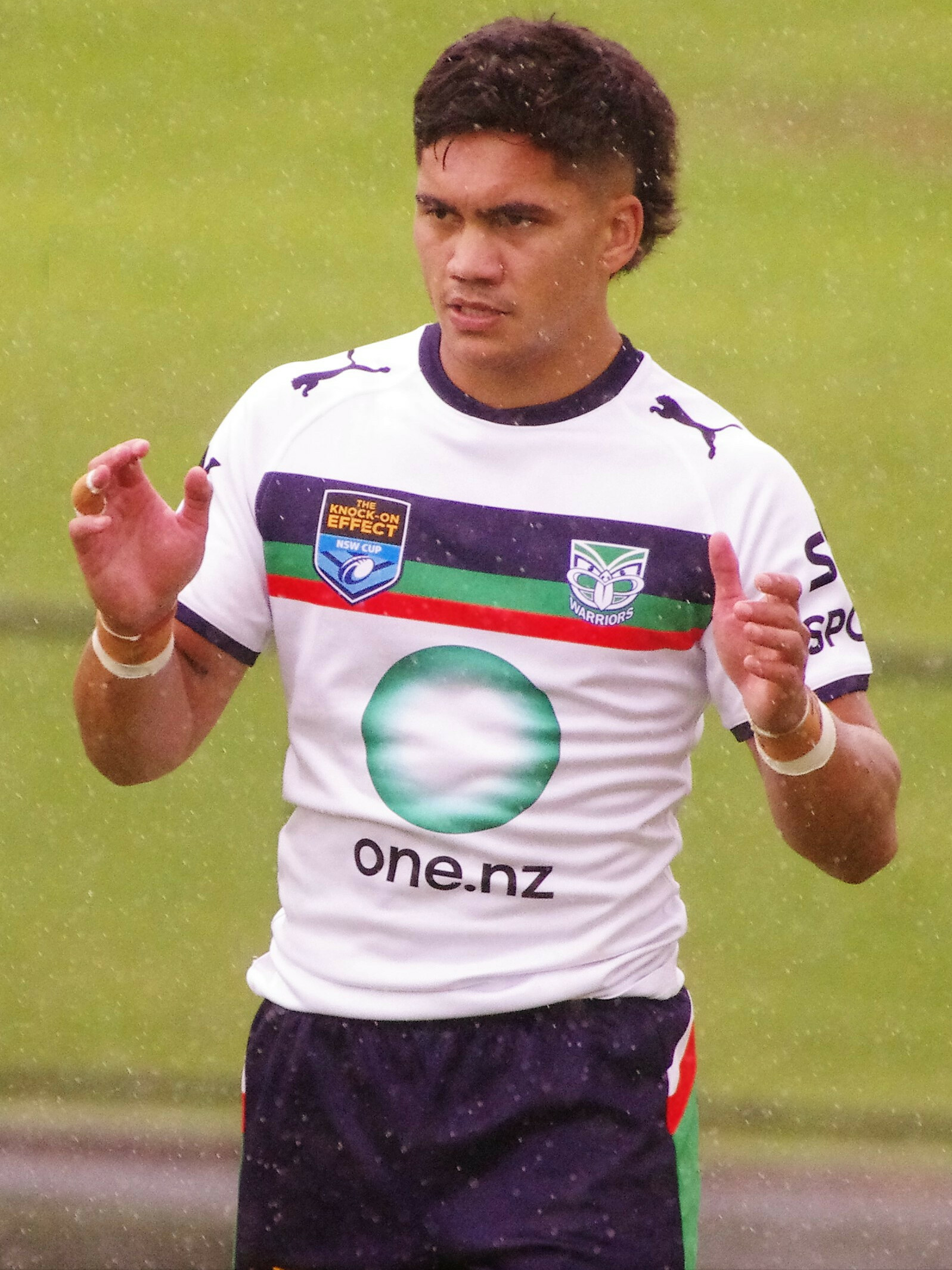

Personal information
- Full name: Taine Tuaupiki
- Born: 31 August 1999 (age 27) Manly, New South Wales, Australia
- Height: 178 cm (5 ft 10 in)
- Weight: 83 kg (13 st 1 lb)

Playing information
- Position: Fullback, Wing
Club
Years	Team	Pld	T	G	FG	P
2023–	New Zealand Warriors	47	10	35	0	110
- Source: As of 15 November 2026
- Relatives: Te Maire Martin (cousin)

Taine Tuaupiki (/taʊpɪki/) (born 31 August 1999) is a New Zealand rugby league footballer who plays as a fullback or winger for the New Zealand Warriors in the National Rugby League (NRL).

== Background ==
Tuaupiki was born in Manly, New South Wales, Australia. He grew up in Ngaruawahia but is from Taharoa on the southern side of Kawhia Harbour.

Tuaupiki is related to fellow New Zealand Warriors player, Te Maire Martin.

== Playing career ==
=== Early career ===
Tuaupiki was educated at Coombabah State High School, where he played in the 2016 NRL Schoolboys Cup Queensland final against Keebra Park State High School, and played junior rugby league for the Burleigh Bears, progressing through to the Hastings Deering Colts competition in 2019. Following an impressive season for Burleigh in the 2022 Queensland Cup season, Tuaupiki won the Petero Civoniceva Medal as the competition's best and fairest while also being named the rookie of the year, earning a NRL development contract with the New Zealand Warriors. Tuaupiki also won Burleigh's player of the year award to cap off his time at the Queensland Cup club.

=== New Zealand Warriors: 2023–present ===
Tuaupiki was one of a host of players who excelled in the New Zealand Warriors' 48–12 win over Wests Tigers in their first NRL trial at Mount Smart Stadium. Tuaupiki was upgraded to a fulltime NRL contract with the Warriors for the 2023 season. Tuaupiki made his first grade debut in his side's 26−12 victory over the North Queensland Cowboys at North Queensland Stadium in round 3 of the 2023 NRL season, impressing in the absence of the Warriors regular fullback Charnze Nicoll-Klokstad.

He played five games for the New Zealand Warriors in the 2023 NRL season as the club finished 4th on the table and qualified for the finals. On 24 October, Tuaupiki had re-signed with the club on a two-year deal. He played 14 games with New Zealand in the 2025 NRL season as the club finished 6th on the table and qualified for the finals. They were eliminated by Penrith in the first week of the finals. On 28 September, he played in New Zealand's 30-12 NSW Cup Grand Final victory over St. George Illawarra.

On 27 February 2026, the New Zealand Warriors announced that Tuaupiki re-signed with the club for a further two years. He played 22 games for the New Zealand Warriors in the 2026 NRL season as the club finished second on the table but were eliminated from the finals in straight sets. On 6 November 2026, the Warriors announced that Tuaupiki had signed a year extension to his current deal keeping him at the club until the end of 2029.

== Honours ==
Individual

- Petero Civoniceva Medal (Queensland Cup Player of the Year): 2022
- Queensland Cup Rookie of the Year: 2022
- Burleigh Bears Player of the Year: 2022

== Statistics ==
Year	Team	Games	Tries	Goals	Pts
2023	New Zealand Warriors	5			
2024	New Zealand Warriors	6	1	3	10
2025	New Zealand Warriors	14	2	1	10
2026	New Zealand Warriors	9	1	6	16
2027	New Zealand Warriors				
	Totals	34	4	10	36
