= Jacob Laban =

NZ international rugby league footballer

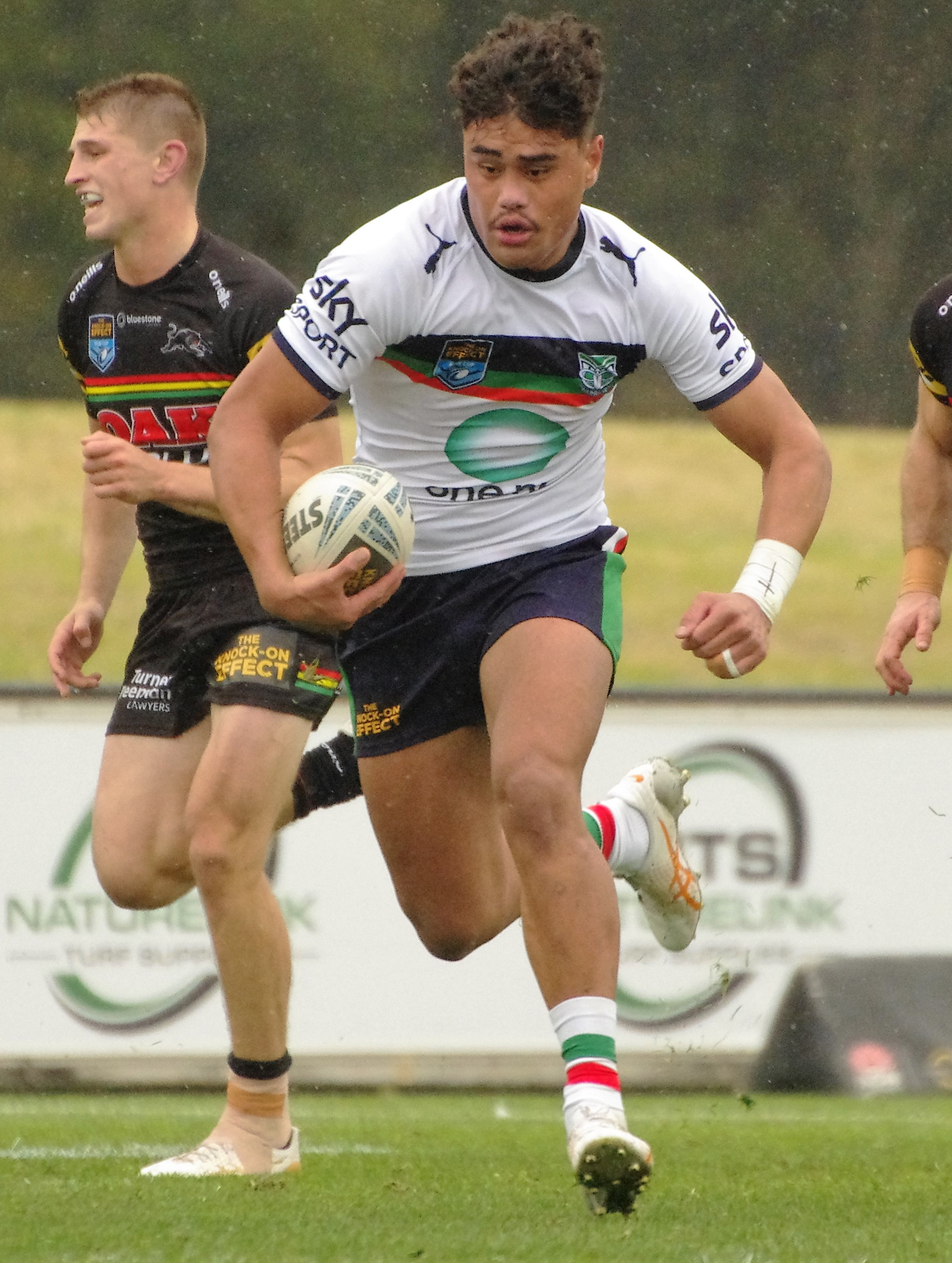

Personal information
- Full name: Jacob Laban
- Born: 17 April 2004 (age 22) Motoʻotua, Samoa
- Height: 189 cm (6 ft 2 in)
- Weight: 110 kg (17 st 5 lb)

Playing information
- Position: Second-row
Club
Years	Team	Pld	T	G	FG	P
2024–	New Zealand Warriors	44	10	0	0	40
Representative
Years	Team	Pld	T	G	FG	P
2026–	New Zealand	1	0	0	0	0
- Source: As of 6 November 2026
- Education: St Bernard's College, Lower Hutt
- Relatives: Ken Laban (uncle); Winnie Laban (aunt)

Jacob Laban (born 17 April 2004) is a New Zealand international rugby league footballer who plays as a second-row forward for the New Zealand Warriors in the NRL.

== Background ==
Born in Moto'otua, Samoa, on April 17, 2004, Jacob Laban moved to New Zealand at the age of three. He comes from a diverse heritage; his father, Patelesio Laban, hails from the Samoan villages of Faleula and Sa'anapu, while his mother, Alysia (Albert) Laban, is of Māori descent from the iwi of Te Āti Awa in Waiwhetu, Lower Hutt.

Jacob attended Gracefield Primary School and Hutt Intermediate during his junior years. He later enrolled at St Bernard's College in Lower Hutt before moving to Auckland in 2021. There, he completed Year 13 at Kelston Boys' High School after being awarded a rugby scholarship.

Jacob’s journey in rugby league began at the Te Aroha Rugby League Club in Waiwhetu. However, due to a shortage of players in the junior grades, he moved to the Randwick Kingfishers. It was during his time with Randwick that his talent flourished, earning him selection for the Wellington Orcas representative teams.

Jacob is a nephew to Ken Laban on his Samoan grandfather's father's side.

== Career ==
Laban made his first grade debut in his side's 34−4 victory over the South Sydney Rabbitohs in round 5 of the 2024 NRL season.

During a match in NSW cup, Laban was sent off after a melee with Canberra Raiders player Corey Horsburgh when Horsburgh and Laban came to blows.

On 30 September 2024, Laban was named in the NSW Cup team of the year.

=== 2025 ===
On 21 May, the New Zealand Warriors announced that Laban had re-signed with the club until the end of the 2029 season. He played 12 games with New Zealand in the 2025 NRL season as the club finished 6th on the table and qualified for the finals. They were eliminated by Penrith in the first week of the finals.

On 1 August, Laban was injured after fracturing his leg as a result of an illegal tackle by Dolphins prop Felise Kaufusi. The tackle was ruled as a grade two dangerous contact charge and Kaufusi was hit with a two-match ban.

=== 2026 ===
Laban played 25 games for the New Zealand Warriors in the 2026 NRL season as the club finished second on the table but were eliminated from the finals in straight sets.

He made his New Zealand international début in the 2026 Rugby League World Cup 82-16 win over Cook Islands on 25 October 2026.
