= McCarthy Catholic College =

McCarthy Catholic College may refer to:

- McCarthy Catholic College, Emu Plains, New South Wales, Australia
- McCarthy Catholic College, Tamworth, New South Wales, Australia
