= Te Maire Martin =

NZ international rugby league footballer

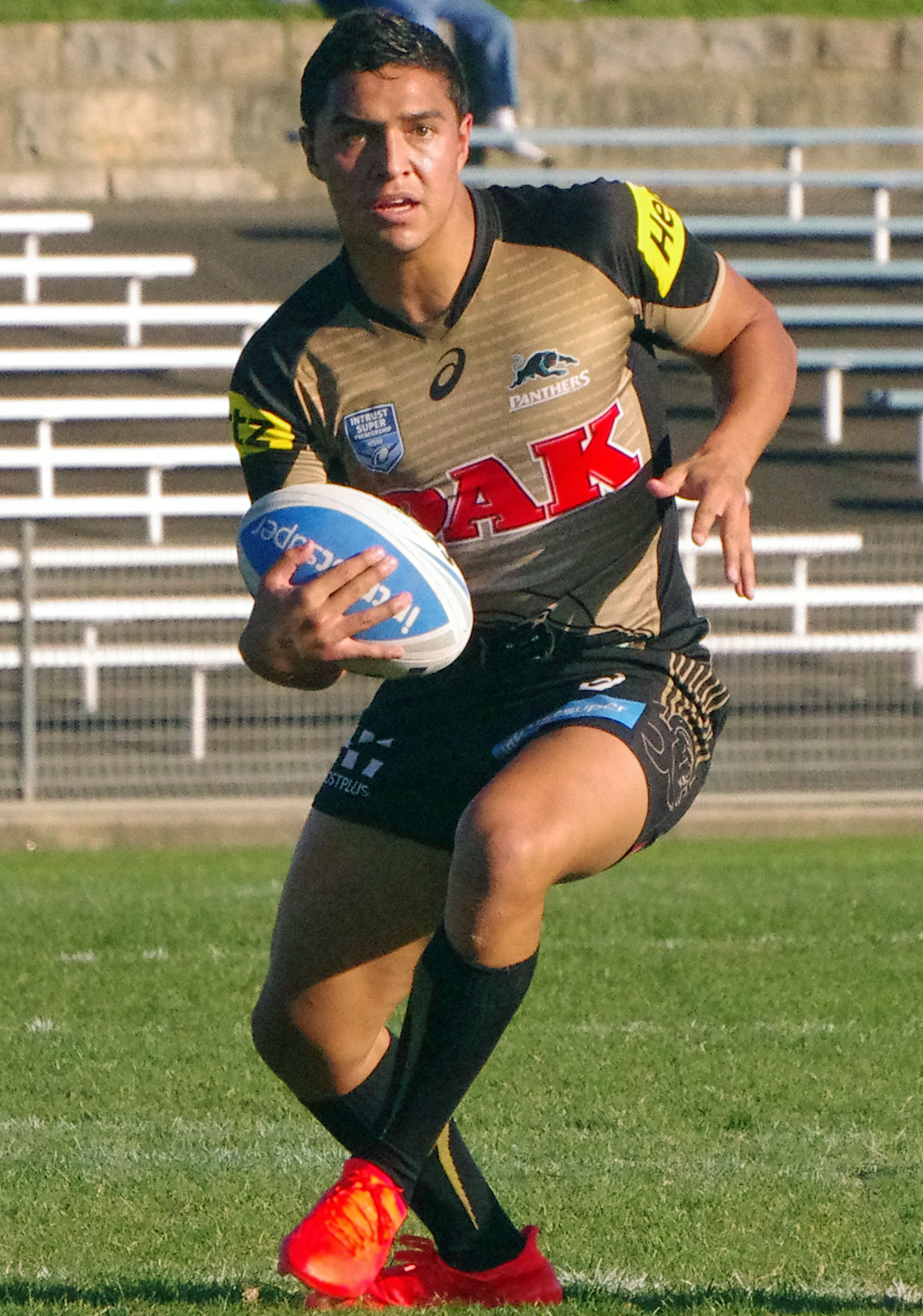

Personal information
- Born: 2 October 1995 (age 31) Tokoroa, New Zealand
- Height: 181 cm (5 ft 11 in)
- Weight: 87 kg (13 st 10 lb)

Playing information
- Position: Five-eighth, Fullback, Halfback
Club
Years	Team	Pld	T	G	FG	P
2016–17	Penrith Panthers	13	4	0	1	17
2017–19	North Qld Cowboys	42	10	0	0	40
2022	Brisbane Broncos	13	1	0	0	4
2023–	New Zealand Warriors	55	11	0	0	44
	Total	123	26	0	1	105
Representative
Years	Team	Pld	T	G	FG	P
2016–	New Zealand	8	4	0	0	16
2024	Māori All Stars	1	0	0	0	0
- Source: As of 16 November 2026

Te Maire Martin (born 2 October 1995) is a New Zealand professional rugby league footballer who plays as a five-eighth, fullback and halfback for the New Zealand Warriors in the National Rugby League (NRL) and is a New Zealand international.

Martin previously played for the Brisbane Broncos, North Queensland Cowboys and Penrith Panthers. Martin took a break from NRL after being diagnosed with a bleed on the brain in April 2019. He returned to the NRL in 2022 with the Brisbane Broncos.

== Background ==
Martin was born in Tokoroa, New Zealand, and is of Māori descent, specifically the Ngāti Kahungunu ki Wairarapa and Waikato Tainui Iwi tribes.

Martin grew up in Taharoa and played his junior football for Turangawaewae before moving to the Gold Coast, Australia and attending Keebra Park State High School on a scholarship.

Martin is related to fellow New Zealand Warriors player, Taine Tuaupiki.

== Playing career ==
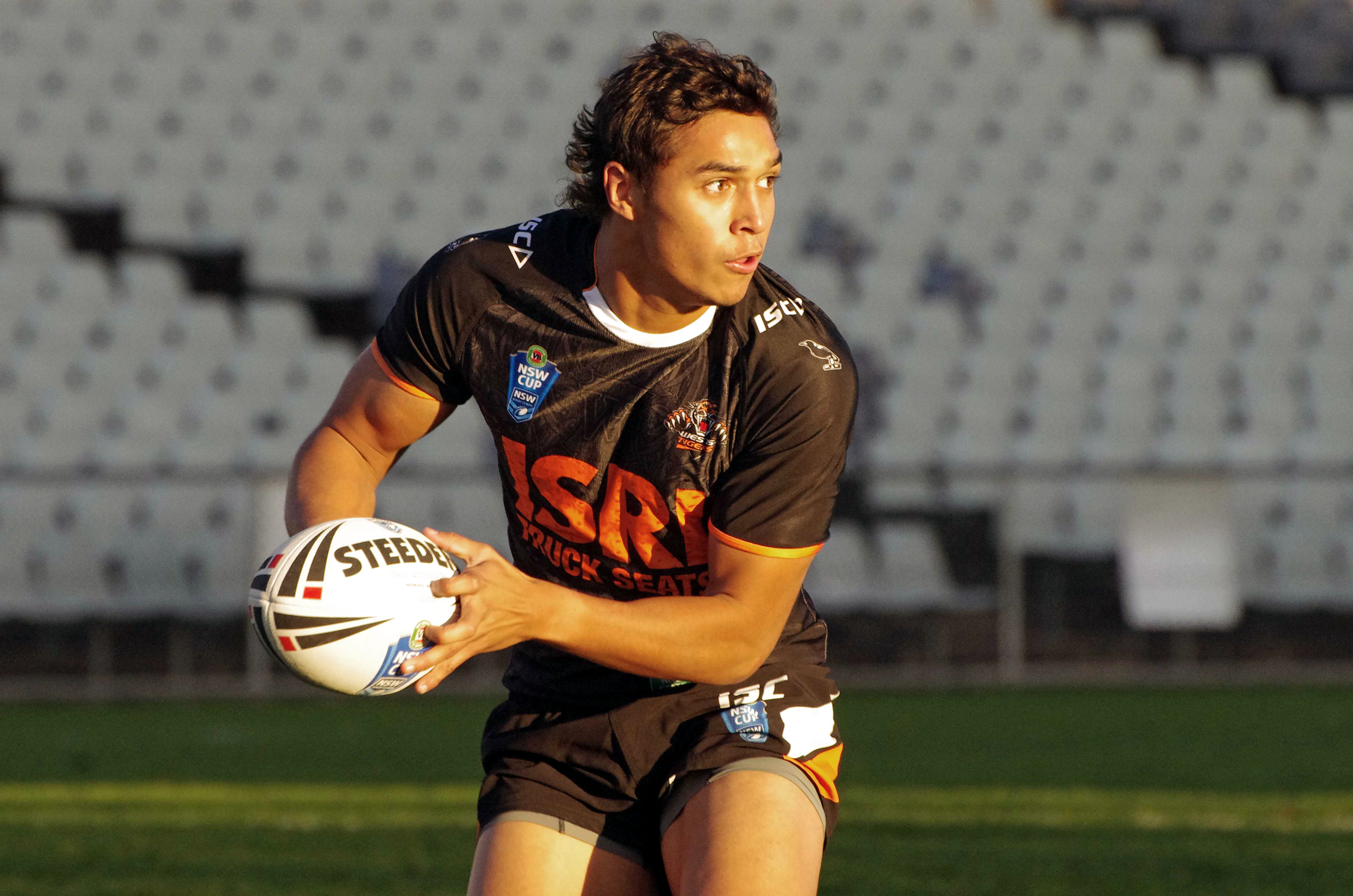
Martin playing for the Wests Tigers

=== Early career ===
Martin was signed by the Wests Tigers and played in their Holden Cup team in 2014 and 2015, where he played in 40 matches and scored 15 tries. In both seasons of his Holden Cup career, Martin was named as the five-eighth in the Holden Cup Team of the Year. On 18 October 2014, Martin played for the Junior Kiwis against the Junior Kangaroos, playing at five-eighth and kicked the game-winning field goal, giving the Kiwis the 15–14 victory at Mt Smart Stadium. On 2 May 2015, Martin again played for the Junior Kiwis at five-eighth against the Junior Kangaroos, scoring a try in the 22–20 loss at Cbus Super Stadium.

On 24 September 2015, Martin was named in the New Zealand national rugby league team training squad for their tour of Great Britain, but did not make the final squad.

=== 2016 ===
Martin signed with the Penrith Panthers for the 2016 NRL season and played in the 2016 NRL Auckland Nines tournament. In round 3 Martin made his NRL debut playing at five-eighth against the Brisbane Broncos. He scored a try and kicked the match winning field goal in the Panthers 23–22 win at Penrith Stadium. After playing just six games in the NRL, he suffered a season ending shoulder injury in Round 8 against the Cronulla-Sutherland Sharks. He finished off the season playing 6 games, scoring 2 tries and 1 field goal.

On 11 November, Martin made his Test debut for New Zealand, coming off the interchange in their 18-all draw with Scotland.

=== 2017 ===
After starting the season with Penrith and playing seven first grade games, Martin moved to the North Queensland Cowboys mid-season on a three-year deal. In round 17, he made his debut for the North Queensland side, starting at five-eighth against the Canberra Raiders, scoring two tries in his club debut. On 1 October, Martin started at five-eighth in the Cowboys' 2017 NRL Grand Final loss to the Melbourne Storm, scoring the side's only try.

On 5 October, Martin was named in the New Zealand squad for the 2017 Rugby League World Cup.

=== 2018 ===
Martin started at five-eighth in round 1 of the 2018 NRL season, filling in for the injured Michael Morgan and playing alongside Johnathan Thurston for the first time. When Morgan returned in round 3, Martin played of the interchange for a number of games. In June, he started at five-eighth for New Zealand in their 36–18 loss to England at Mile High Stadium in Denver.

Later in the season, Martin shifted to fullback when Morgan was ruled out for the season, playing five games in the position.

=== 2019 ===
Martin started the 2019 season at five-eighth before moving to fullback in round 3. On 1 May, North Queensland announced that Martin would be sidelined indefinitely with a small bleed on his brain. On 9 July, Martin returned to training but missed the rest of the season. Martin's contract expired following the 2019 season but he remained at North Queensland, undertaking pre-season training in the hope of being cleared to play rugby league again.

=== 2020 ===
On 12 January 2020, Martin announced his immediate retirement from rugby league. He revealed that he could not get cleared for contact training, effectively ending his career.

=== 2022 ===
On 7 January 2022, the Brisbane Broncos announced Martin would be joining the club ahead of the 2022 NRL season on a Development contract, after more than two years out of the professional ranks of Rugby League. Martin had joined the Brisbane club in late 2021 originally on a train and trial basis however impressed and was thus awarded a permanent spot on the roster. He passed a final medical clearance and will make his return with Broncos affiliate Wynnum Manly Seagulls in the Intrust Super Cup.

"It's great to see Te Maire back in an NRL system. "Prior to his brain injury he was one hell of a player ... hugely skilful, and a very dangerous ball runner. "Te Maire joins us on a development list contract and I've no doubt will be pushing some of our other notable candidates to partner Adam Reynolds in the halves." - Brisbane Head Of Football Ben Ikin. On 2 August 2022, It was announced that Martin would sign with the New Zealand Warriors on a three-year deal from 2023 onwards.

=== 2023 ===
Martin played nine games for the New Zealand Warriors in the 2023 NRL season as the club finished 4th on the table and qualified for the finals. Martin played in all three finals games as the club reached the preliminary final before being defeated by Brisbane.

=== 2024 ===
Martin played 16 games for the New Zealand Warriors in the 2024 NRL season which saw the club finish 13th on the table.

=== 2025 ===
On 12 August, the New Zealand Warriors announced that Martin had signed a one year extension with the club. He played 17 matches with New Zealand in the 2025 NRL season as the club finished 6th on the table and qualified for the finals. They were eliminated by Penrith in the first week of the finals.

=== 2026 ===
On 6 July, the New Zealand Warriors announced that Martin had re-signed with the club for a further year. Martin was limited to just 13 games for the New Zealand Warriors in the 2026 NRL season as the club finished second on the table but were eliminated from the finals in straight sets.

== Statistics ==
=== NRL ===
*denotes season competing

Season	Team	Matches	T	G	GK %	F/G	Pts
2016	Penrith	6	2	0	—	1	9
2017	Penrith	7	2	0	—	0	8
2017	North Queensland	12	6	0	—	0	24
2018	North Queensland	23	1	0	—	0	4
2019	North Queensland	7	3	0	0.0%	0	12
2022	Brisbane Broncos	13	1				4
2023	New Zealand Warriors	9					
2024	New Zealand Warriors	16	5				20
2025	New Zealand Warriors	17					
2026	New Zealand Warriors	13	6				24
2027	New Zealand Warriors						
Career totals		123	26	0	0.0%	1	105

=== International ===
Season	Team	Matches	T	G	GK %	F/G	Pts
2016	New Zealand	1	0	0	—	0	0
2017	New Zealand	2	3	0	—	0	0
2018	New Zealand	1	0	0	—	0	0
Career totals		4	3	0	—	0	12
