= Siale Faeamani =

New Zealand rugby league footballer (born 2004)

Personal information
- Full name: Sialetili Faeamani
- Born: 23 March 2004 (age 22) Auckland, New Zealand
- Height: 175 cm (5 ft 9 in)
- Weight: 94 kg (14 st 11 lb)

Playing information
- Position: Centre, Wing
Club
Years	Team	Pld	T	G	FG	P
2026–	Gold Coast Titans	10	5	0	0	20
- Source: RLP

Sialetili Faeamani (born 23 March 2004) is a New Zealand rugby league footballer for the Gold Coast Titans in the National Rugby League (NRL).

Faeamani was born in Auckland and grew up in the city's eastern suburbs. Both of his parents are Tongan and he is a first cousin of Tonga international Manu Maʻu.

As a student at St Peter's College, Auckland, Faeamani was a member of the first XV and didn't get his grounding in rugby league until later, while coming through the New Zealand Warriors junior system.

Faeamani, an outside back, was a Point Chevalier Pirates junior. He appeared in the Warriors' S.G. Ball Cup and Jersey Flegg Cup sides, before moving to the Penrith Panthers where he played NSW Cup matches in 2025.

In 2026, Faeamani moved to the Gold Coast Titans and made his first-grade debut in the opening round of the NRL season. He featured in the Titans' first eight matches, then was sidelined with a knee injury and didn't return to first-grade until late in the season, finishing with 10 appearances.
