= Erin Clark =

NZ & Samoa international rugby league footballer

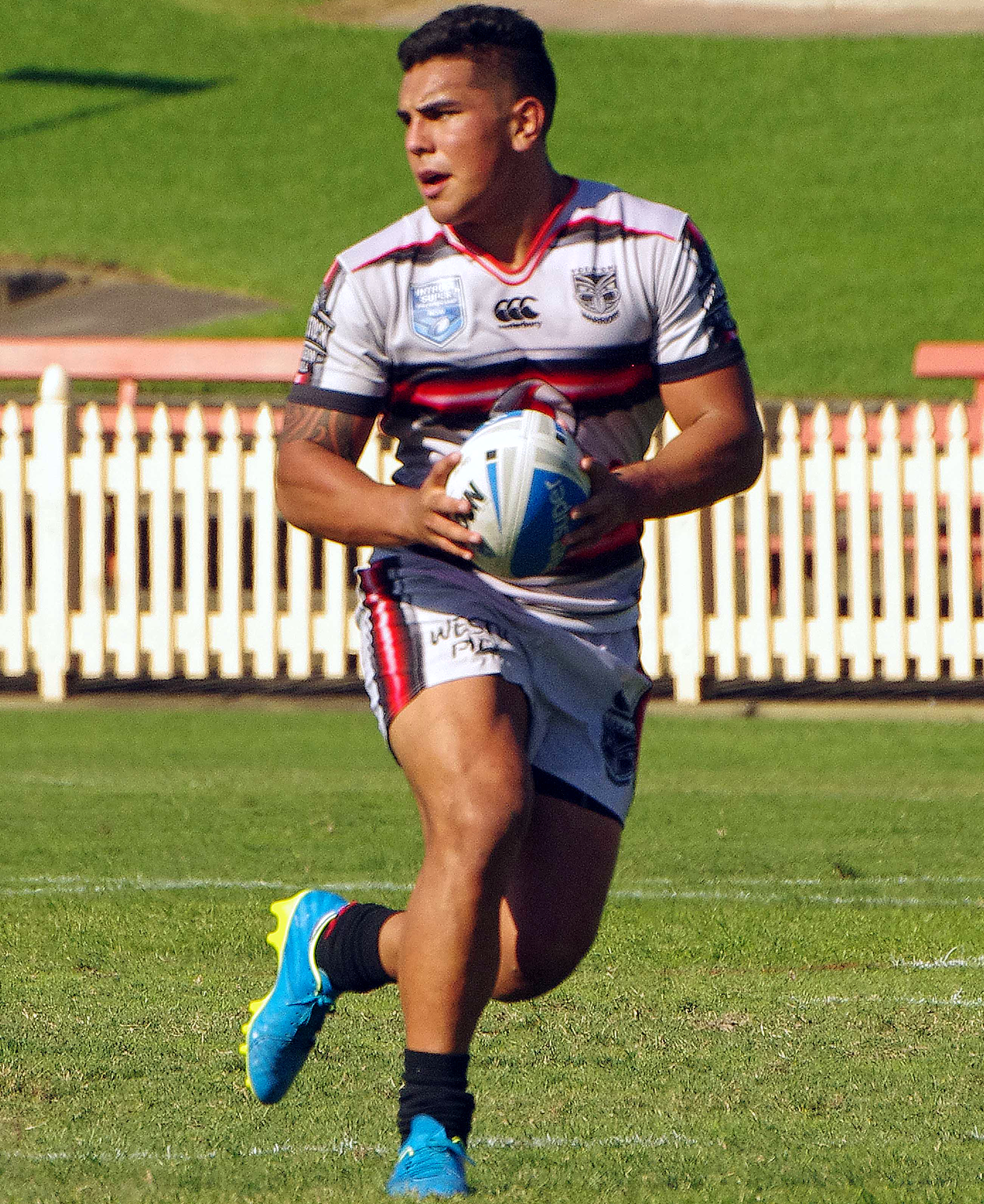

Personal information
- Born: 6 September 1997 (age 29) Auckland, New Zealand
- Height: 180 cm (5 ft 11 in)
- Weight: 98 kg (15 st 6 lb)

Playing information
- Position: Lock, Hooker
Club
| Years | Team | Pld | T | G | FG | P |
|---|---|---|---|---|---|---|
| 2017 | New Zealand Warriors | 1 | 0 | 0 | 0 | 0 |
| 2020–24 | Gold Coast Titans | 94 | 5 | 0 | 0 | 20 |
| 2025– | New Zealand Warriors | 51 | 6 | 0 | 0 | 24 |
| | Total | 146 | 11 | 0 | 0 | 44 |
Representative
| Years | Team | Pld | T | G | FG | P |
| 2016 | Samoa | 2 | 0 | 0 | 0 | 0 |
| 2022 | Māori All Stars | 1 | 0 | 0 | 0 | 0 |
| 2024– | New Zealand | 9 | 2 | 0 | 0 | 8 |
- Source: As of 19 November 2026

Erin Clark (born 6 September 1997) is a professional rugby league footballer who plays as a lock or hooker for the New Zealand Warriors in the National Rugby League (NRL). He has played for New Zealand and Samoa at international level.

Clark previously played for the Gold Coast Titans in the NRL.

== Background ==
Born in Auckland, New Zealand, Clark is of Māori and Samoan descent. Clark is the son of New Zealand netball great Temepara Bailey and Wayne Clark from Gisborne (Ngati Porou, Te Aitanga ā Hauiti, Nga Puhi and Tainui).

== Playing career ==
Clark played his junior football for the Otahuhu Leopards, Manurewa Marlins and Point Chevalier Pirates, and attended Manurewa High School before being signed by the New Zealand Warriors. Clark represented the New Zealand Residents 18s and the New Zealand Secondary Schools in 2014. In 2014, Clark won the major rugby league accolade at the 2014 ASB Young Sportsperson of the Year Awards. In 2015, Clark was the only player in the Junior Warriors’ squad to appear in all 27 matches in the season.

On 7 May 2016, Clark played for Samoa against Tonga in the 2016 Polynesian Cup, where he played off the interchange bench in the 18–6 win at Parramatta Stadium. Later in the year he represented Samoa in a test match against Fiji in Apia, playing off the interchange bench in their 18–20 loss. Clark made his first grade debut for the Warriors during the 2017 NRL season against Melbourne. He played for the Junior Kiwis on 5 May. On 9 June 2017, he was granted a release from the New Zealand Warriors and joined the Canberra Raiders. On 24 November 2017, Clark requested a release from his Canberra contract and returned to New Zealand. On 5 November 2019, Clark returned to rugby league, joining the Gold Coast on a train and trial deal. On 10 January 2020, he signed a two-year deal with club.

=== 2021 ===
Clark played 19 games for the Gold Coast in the 2021 NRL season including the club's elimination final loss against the Sydney Roosters.

=== 2022 ===
Clark played a total of 21 games for the club in the 2022 NRL season as the Gold Coast finished 13th on the table.

=== 2023 ===
Clark played a total of 20 matches for the Gold Coast in the 2023 NRL season as the club finished 14th on the table.

=== 2024 ===
Clark played a total of 24 matches in the 2024 NRL season, as the club had finished 13th on the table. It was announced on 9 September 2024 that Clark had signed a three-year deal to return to the New Zealand Warriors. Clark made his debut from the bench for the Kiwis against Papua New Guinea, in a 54–12 win.

=== 2025 ===
Clark played 25 games with New Zealand in the 2025 NRL season as the club finished 6th on the table and qualified for the finals. They were eliminated by Penrith in the first week of the finals.

=== 2026 ===
On 15 April, the New Zealand Warriors announced that Clark had re-signed with the club until the end of 2029. Clark played 26 games for the club in 2026 as the club finished second on the table but were eliminated from the finals in straight sets.

== Statistics ==
| Year | Team | Games | Tries | Pts |
|---|---|---|---|---|
| 2017 | New Zealand Warriors | 1 | | |
| 2020 | Gold Coast Titans | 10 | | |
| 2021 | Gold Coast Titans | 19 | 1 | 4 |
| 2022 | Gold Coast Titans | 21 | 2 | 8 |
| 2023 | Gold Coast Titans | 20 | 1 | 4 |
| 2024 | Gold Coast Titans | 24 | 1 | 4 |
| 2025 | New Zealand Warriors | 25 | | |
| 2026 | New Zealand Warriors | 26 | 6 | 24 |
| 2027 | New Zealand Warriors | | | |
| | Totals | 146 | 11 | 44 |

*denotes season competing
