= Eddie Ieremia-Toeava =

New Zealand rugby league player

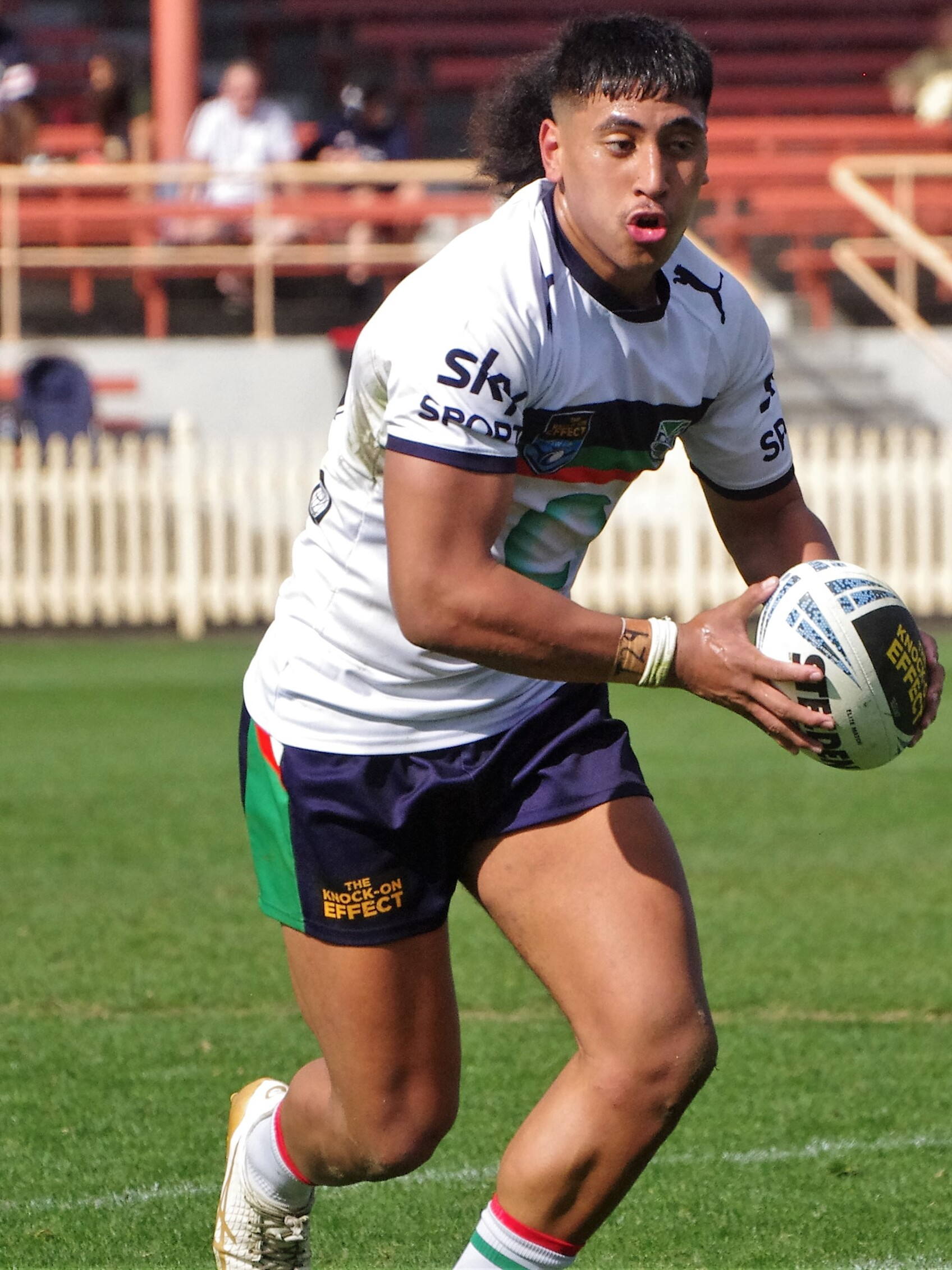

Personal information
- Full name: Edward Ieremia-Toeava
- Born: 15 December 2004 (age 21) Auckland, New Zealand
- Height: 190 cm (6 ft 3 in)
- Weight: 96 kg (15 st 2 lb)

Playing information
- Position: Second-row
Club
Years	Team	Pld	T	G	FG	P
2025–	New Zealand Warriors	18	2	0	0	8

Eddie Ieremia-Toeava (born 15 December 2004) is a New Zealand rugby league footballer who plays as a second-row forward for the New Zealand Warriors in the National Rugby League (NRL).

== Background ==
Ieremia-Toeava attended De La Salle College before being signed by the Warriors. He appeared in the Warriors SG Ball and Jersey Flegg squads before debuting in the NSW Cup.

== Career ==
In Round 22 of the 2025 NRL season, Ieremia-Toeava made his first grade debut for the New Zealand Warriors against the Dolphins at Mount Smart Stadium. Coming off the bench in a 20–18 loss. On 28 September 2025, he played in New Zealand's 30-12 NSW Cup Grand Final victory over St. George Illawarra. On 19 December 2025, the New Zealand Warriors announced that Ieremia-Toeava had re-signed with the club until the end of 2028 and was elevated into the teams Top 30. He played 13 matches for the New Zealand Warriors in the 2026 NRL season as the club finished second on the table but were eliminated from the finals in straight sets.
