= Luke Hanson =

Australian rugby league footballer

Personal information
- Full name: Luke Hanson
- Born: 19 February 2004 (age 22) Sydney, New South Wales, Australia
- Height: 174 cm (5 ft 9 in)
- Weight: 82 kg (12 st 13 lb)

Playing information
- Position: Five-eighth, Halfback
Club
Years	Team	Pld	T	G	FG	P
2026	New Zealand Warriors	3	1	0	1	5
2027–	Gold Coast Titans	0	0	0	0	0
	Total	3	1	0	1	5

Luke Hanson is an Australian professional rugby league footballer who plays as a five-eighth or halfback for the Gold Coast Titans in the National Rugby League (NRL).

He previously played for the New Zealand Warriors in the NRL.

== Personal life ==
His mother's cousin is Olympian Suzanne Balogh.

== Playing career ==
Hanson was a Glenmore Park Brumbies junior before signing with the Penrith Panthers and playing in their SG Ball Cup winning side in 2022. Hanson captained their SG Ball and Jersey Flegg Cup sides.

He joined the New Zealand Warriors in 2025 and played in their NSW Cup-winning side that also won the 2025 NRL State Championship.

He debuted for the New Zealand Warriors on 21 March 2026, starting at stand-off against the Newcastle Knights.

He will join the Gold Coast Titans in 2027.
