= Wayde Egan =

Australian rugby league footballer

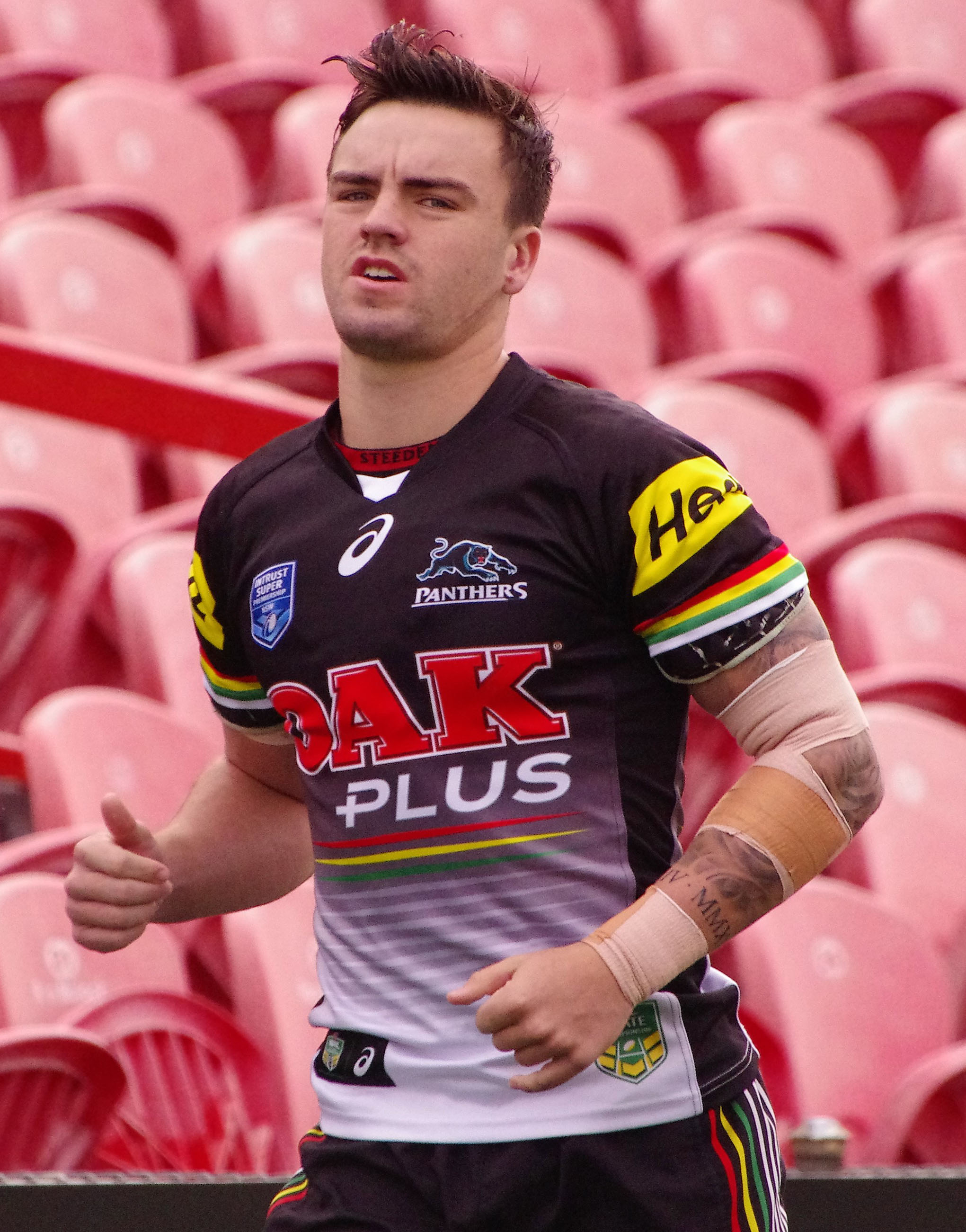

Personal information
- Full name: Wayde Egan
- Born: 20 March 1997 (age 29) Lithgow, New South Wales, Australia
- Height: 185 cm (6 ft 1 in)
- Weight: 91 kg (14 st 5 lb)

Playing information
- Position: Hooker
Club
Years	Team	Pld	T	G	FG	P
2018–19	Penrith Panthers	29	3	0	0	12
2020–	New Zealand Warriors	146	21	0	0	84
	Total	175	24	0	0	96
- Source: As of 20 September 2026

Wayde Egan (born 20 March 1997) is an Australian professional rugby league footballer who plays as a hooker for the New Zealand Warriors in the National Rugby League (NRL).

== Background ==
Egan was born in Lithgow, New South Wales, Australia, and was educated at Lithgow High School.

He played his junior rugby league for the Lithgow Storm, before being signed by the Penrith Panthers.

== Playing career ==
=== Early career ===
From 2016 to 2017, Egan played for the Penrith Panthers' NYC team, co-captaining the side in 2017. In August 2017, he re-signed with the Panthers on a 2-year contract until the end of 2019. In September 2017, he was named at hooker in the NYC Team of the Year.

=== 2018 ===
In 2018, Egan graduated to the Panthers' Intrust Super Premiership NSW team. In round 4 of the 2018 NRL season, he made his NRL debut for the Panthers against the North Queensland Cowboys.

=== 2019 ===
Egan made a total of 18 appearances for Penrith in the 2019 NRL season as the club finished 10th on the table and missed the finals for the first time since 2015. Following the conclusion of the season, Egan was told by Penrith that he was free to look elsewhere for the 2020 season as his contract would not be renewed. On 22 October, Egan signed a contract to join the New Zealand Warriors for the 2020 NRL season.

=== 2020 ===
Egan made a total of 18 appearances for the New Zealand Warriors as the club missed out on the finals.

=== 2021 ===
On 18 July, Egan was ruled out for the remainder of the 2021 NRL season after suffering a shoulder injury in the club's loss against Penrith although he did make an early comeback.

=== 2022 ===
Egan made a total of 20 appearances for the New Zealand Warriors in the 2022 NRL season as they finished 15th on the table.

=== 2023 ===
On 10 July, Egan re-signed with the club until the end of the 2025 NRL season. Egan played 22 games for the New Zealand Warriors in the 2023 NRL season as the club finished 4th on the table and qualified for the finals. Egan played in all three finals games as the club reached the preliminary final stage before being knocked out by Brisbane.

=== 2024 ===
Egan made 20 appearances for the New Zealand Warriors in the 2024 NRL season which saw the club finish 13th on the table. Egan re-signed with the club until the end of the 2027 season.

=== 2025 ===
Egan played 21 games with New Zealand in the 2025 NRL season as the club finished 6th on the table and qualified for the finals. They were eliminated by Penrith in the first week of the finals.

=== 2026 ===
Egan played 25 games for the New Zealand Warriors in the 2026 NRL season as the club finished second on the table but were eliminated from the finals in straight sets. On 22 October 2026, the Warriors announced that Egan had re-signed with the club until the end of 2028.

== Statistics ==
Year	Club	Games	Tries	Pts
2018	Penrith Panthers	11	1	4
2019	Penrith Panthers	18	2	8
2020	New Zealand Warriors	18	2	8
2021	New Zealand Warriors	20	3	12
2022	New Zealand Warriors	20	4	16
2023	New Zealand Warriors	22	6	24
2024	New Zealand Warriors	20	1	4
2025	New Zealand Warriors	21	2	8
2026	New Zealand Warriors	25	3	12
2027	New Zealand Warriors			
	Totals	175	24	96

*denotes season competing
