= Makaia Tafua =

New Zealand rugby league footballer (born 2004)

Personal information
- Full name: Makaia Tafua
- Born: 14 June 2004 (age 22) Christchurch, New Zealand
- Height: 180 cm (5 ft 11 in)
- Weight: 88 kg (13 st 12 lb)

Playing information
- Position: Hooker
Club
Years	Team	Pld	T	G	FG	P
2026–	New Zealand Warriors	3	0	0	0	0

Makaia Tafua is a New Zealand professional rugby league footballer who plays as a hooker for the New Zealand Warriors in the National Rugby League (NRL).

== Personal life ==
His sister, Jaydika Tafua plays for the Cronulla-Sutherland Sharks in the NRL Women's Premiership.

== Playing career ==
A Linwood Keas junior, Tafua joined the New Zealand Warriors where he played in their SG Ball Cup, Jersey Flegg Cup and NSW Cup sides.

He made his NRL debut for the Warriors in 2026.

On 16 September 2026, Tafua received the Warriors' NSW Cup Players’ Player of the Year award for the 2026 season.
