= Jett Cleary =

Ukraine international rugby league footballer (b. 2005)

Personal information
- Born: 2 April 2005 (age 21) Auckland, New Zealand
- Height: 182 cm (6 ft 0 in)
- Weight: 84 kg (13 st 3 lb)

Playing information
- Position: Halfback
Club
Years	Team	Pld	T	G	FG	P
2026	New Zealand Warriors	1	0	0	0	0
2027–	Penrith Panthers	0	0	0	0	0
	Total	1	0	0	0	0
Representative
Years	Team	Pld	T	G	FG	P
2025	Ukraine	3	1	9	0	22

Jett Cleary (born 2 April 2005) is a Ukraine international rugby league footballer who plays as a halfback for the Penrith Panthers in the NRL.

He previously played for the New Zealand Warriors in the National Rugby League.

== Playing career ==
Cleary was a Penrith Panthers junior.

He played for the New Zealand Warriors in the 2025 NSW Cup winning side that also won the NRL State Championship. Cleary represented Ukraine at the 2025 Rugby League European Championships.

Cleary made his NRL debut for the Warriors against the Newcastle Knights on 30 August 2026. He made three try assists during the game. He and his dad became the second father-son combination to play for the Warriors.

Cleary was granted an early release from the Warriors to rejoin the Penrith Panthers for the 2027 season.

== Personal life ==
Cleary is the son of Ivan Cleary and was born in Auckland while Ivan was playing for the New Zealand Warriors. He is the brother of Nathan Cleary.
