= Keebra Park State High School =

Location
- Anne St; Southport - Gold Coast, Queensland, 4215; Australia; 27°59′4.06″S 153°23′58.71″E

Information
- Type: State secondary day school
- Motto: Latin: Honesta quam splendida (Honourable deeds rather than splendid ones)
- Religious affiliation: Non-denominational
- Established: 1973
- Authority: Department of Education (Queensland)
- Principal: Adam Brandis
- Deputy Principals: Lisa Chippendale; Iain McLennan; Kylie Oxenford; Jarrod Wells
- Business Manager: Angela Zavros
- Staff: 87 (Teaching); 37 (Non-Teaching)
- Year levels: Year 7 – Year 12
- Gender: Coeducational
- Enrolment: 1,001 (August 2025)
- Capacity: 1,060
- Language: English
- Area: 14.9 hectares (0.15 km^{2})
- Colours: Maroon; Blue
- Website: keebraparkshs.eq.edu.au

Keebra Park State High School (KPSHS), referred to as Keebra Park or Keebra, is a coeducational public secondary school, located in the Gold Coast suburb of Southport, Queensland, Australia. The school falls within Division 6 of Gold Coast council.

== Students ==
=== Year levels ===
Queensland secondary schools started catering for Year 7 to align Queensland with the other states, as part of the official implementation in 2015 of Anna Bligh's state-wide "Flying Start" program. As part of a 2013 trial, some schools implemented this transition early. 2013 was the last year Keebra Park State High School catered only for Year 8 to Year 12. Since 2014, the year levels currently offered at this school are Year 7 to Year 12.

== Administration ==
=== Staff ===
As of 2025, the school has a teaching staff of 87 (Full-time equivalent: 81.8) and a non-teaching staff of 37 (Full-time equivalent of 30.1).

=== Principals ===
The first principal of the school was Garfield Prowse in 1973. As of 2025, the current principal is Adam Brandis. Recent principals have included:

Principals of the School
| Principal | Tenure | | | |
| Principal | Initial Year | Ref | Final Year | Ref |
|---|---|---|---|---|
| Adam Brandis | 2016 | | Current | |
| Catherine Pfingst | 2012 | | 2015 | |
| Cameron Hodges | c. 2009 | | 2011 | |

Other principals prior to these have included Frances Jones.

=== Student enrolments ===
In 2025, Keebra Park State High School was reported to have a maximum student enrolment capacity of 1,060 students.

The trend in school enrolments (August figures) has been:

Student enrolment trends
| Year | Year levels | | | | | | Boys | Girls | Total | Ref |
| Year | 7 | 8 | 9 | 10 | 11 | 12 | Boys | Girls | Total | Ref |
|---|---|---|---|---|---|---|---|---|---|---|
| 2008 | - | - | - | - | - | - | - | - | 681 | |
| 2009 | - | - | - | - | - | - | 403 | 213 | 616 | |
| 2010 | - | - | - | - | - | - | 436 | 229 | 665 | |
| 2011 | - | - | - | - | - | - | 477 | 229 | 706 | |
| 2012 | - | - | - | - | - | - | 452 | 241 | 693 | |
| 2013 | - | - | - | - | - | - | 457 | 254 | 711 | |
| 2014 | - | - | - | - | - | - | 429 | 254 | 683 | |
| 2015 | - | - | - | - | - | - | 488 | 282 | 770 | |
| 2016 | - | - | - | - | - | - | 453 | 306 | 759 | |
| 2017 | - | - | - | - | - | - | 492 | 349 | 841 | |
| 2018 | - | - | - | - | - | - | 464 | 339 | 803 | |
| 2019 | - | - | - | - | - | - | 481 | 332 | 813 | |
| 2020 | 186 | 155 | 151 | 158 | 126 | 138 | 548 | 366 | 914 | |
| 2021 | 187 | 194 | 181 | 154 | 161 | 116 | 595 | 398 | 993 | |
| 2022 | 166 | 193 | 205 | 196 | 167 | 142 | 644 | 425 | 1,069 | |
| 2023 | 174 | 167 | 193 | 205 | 173 | 141 | 607 | 446 | 1,053 | |
| 2024 | 159 | 160 | 151 | 181 | 173 | 152 | 558 | 418 | 976 | |
| 2025 | TBA | TBA | TBA | TBA | TBA | TBA | 584 | 417 | 1,001 | |
| 2026 | TBA | TBA | TBA | TBA | TBA | TBA | TBA | TBA | TBA | |

== Notable alumni ==
=== Sport ===
Notable Alumni in Sport
| Name | Sport | Achievement |
|---|---|---|
| Corey Allan | Rugby league | Canterbury Bulldogs player. |
| Neccrom Areaiiti | Rugby league | South Sydney Rabbitohs player and Cook Islands international representative. |
| Jesse Arthars | Rugby league | Brisbane Broncos player. |
| Jai Arrow | Rugby league | South Sydney Rabbitohs player and Queensland representative. |
| Daejarn Asi | Rugby league | North Queensland Cowboys player. |
| AJ Brimson | Rugby league | Gold Coast Titans player. |
| Tanah Boyd | Rugby league | Gold Coast Titans player. |
| Jahream Bula | Rugby league | Wests Tigers player |
| Rangi Chase | Rugby league | Doncaster Rovers player and England international representative. |
| JJ Collins | Rugby league | Former Wests Tigers, Newcastle and Canberra player. |
| Ingrid Cronin-Knight | Cricket | New Zealand White Ferns International representative. |
| Greg Eastwood | Rugby league | Former Brisbane Broncos, Canterbury Bulldogs and Leeds player and New Zealand international representative. |
| Kenny Edwards | Rugby league | Castleford Tigers player. |
| Jaelen Feeney | Rugby league | Former Newcastle Knights player. |
| David Fifita | Rugby league | South Sydney Rabbitohs player and Queensland representative. |
| Moeaki Fotuaika | Rugby league | Gold Coast Titans player and Tonga representative. |
| Payne Haas | Rugby league | Brisbane Broncos player and Australian international representative. |
| Tony Hearn | Rugby league | Former North Sydney, South Queensland player and St George player and Queensland representative. |
| Delouise Hoeter | Rugby league | Former Wests Tigers player and Tonga international representative. |
| Dallas Hood | Rugby league | Former Sydney Roosters and Wakefield Trinity Wildcats player. |
| Brett Horsnell | Rugby league | Former Gold Coast Giants, South Queensland Crushers and Parramatta Eels player. |
| Jordan Kahu | Rugby league | Brisbane Broncos player and New Zealand international representative. |
| Richard Kingi | Rugby union | Former Stade Français and Wallabies player. |
| Blake Leary | Rugby league | Former North Queensland and Manly player. |
| Connelly Lemuelu | Rugby league | North Queensland Cowboys player. |
| Lamar Liolevave | Rugby league | Former Wests Tigers player and Fiji international representative. |
| Isaac Liu | Rugby league | Gold Coast Titans player and New Zealand international representative. |
| Jamahl Lolesi | Rugby league | Former Canberra, Canterbury, Wests Tigers and Huddersfield player and New Zealand international representative. |
| Robert Lui | Rugby league | Former Leeds Rhinos player. |
| Te Maire Martin | Rugby league | New Zealand Warriors player and New Zealand international representative. |
| Benji Marshall | Rugby league | Wests Tigers Assistant Coach and New Zealand international representative. |
| Dane McDonald | Rugby league | Former Sheffield Eagles player. |
| Brad Middelbosch | Rugby league | Former Saint-Gaudens Bears player. |
| Thomas Mikaele | Rugby league | Warrington Wolves player. |
| Sam Moa | Rugby league | Former Catalans Dragons player and New Zealand international representative. |
| Tautau Moga | Rugby league | St George Illawarra Dragons player and Samoa international representative. |
| Ben Murdoch-Masila | Rugby league | New Zealand Warriors player and Tonga international representative. |
| Corey Norman | Rugby league | Toulouse Olympique player and Queensland representative. |
| Agnatius Paasi | Rugby league | St Helens R.F.C. player and Tonga international representative. |
| Dean Parata | Rugby league | Former Italy international representative. |
| Matt Parata | Rugby league | Former Italy international representative. |
| Jaxson Paulo | Rugby league | South Sydney Rabbitohs player. |
| Leivaha Pulu | Rugby league | New Zealand Warriors player and Tonga international representative. |
| Tyronne Roberts-Davis | Rugby league | Newcastle Knights player. |
| Kurtis Rowe | Rugby league | Former Wests Tigers player. |
| Dean Scott | Rugby league | Former Gold Coast Seagulls player. |
| Marion Seve | Rugby league | Melbourne Storm player and Samoan international representative. |
| Tim Smith | Rugby league | Former Parramatta, Cronulla, Wigan, Wakefield Trinity and Salford player. |
| Chris St Clair | Rugby league | Former Balmain Tigers player and Italy international representative. |
| Zahara Temara | Rugby league | Sydney Roosters NRLW side player. |
| Lausii Taliauli | Rugby union | Brumbies player and former Australian Sevens representative. |
| Ben Te'o | Rugby league | Brisbane Broncos player, Queensland representative and former England rugby union international representative. |
| Bodene Thompson | Rugby league | Leeds Rhinos player. |
| Robert Tocco | Rugby league | Former Gold Coast Seagulls, Canterbury Bulldogs and South Sydney Rabbitohs player. |
| Harry Tyson-Wilson | Rugby league | Former Hull FC player. |
| Kim Uasi | Rugby league | Former Tonga international representative. |
| Reece Walsh | Rugby league | Brisbane Broncos player. |
| Scott Zahra | Rugby league | Former Gold Coast Chargers player. |

== See also ==
- Education in Queensland
- History of state education in Queensland
- List of schools in Gold Coast, Queensland
- List of schools in Queensland
