= 2024 New Zealand Warriors season =

Australian rugby league club season

- NRL Rank: 13th
- Play-off result: DNQ
- 2024 record: Wins: 9; draws: 1; losses: 14
- Points scored: For: 512; against: 574

Team information
- CEO: Cameron George
- Coach: (Australia) Andrew Webster
- Captain: (New Zealand) Tohu Harris
- Stadium: Go Media Stadium (Capacity: 25,000)
← 2023	List of seasons	2025 →

The 2024 New Zealand Warriors season was the 30th season in the club's history and they competed in the National Rugby League.

The captain Tohu Harris retained his captaincy for his fourth consecutive season, while head coach Andrew Webster maintained his club position for the second consecutive season.

== Squad ==
New Zealand Warriors 2024 squad
Top 30 squad - 2024 NRL season			Supplementary list	Coaching staff
Bunty Afoa – PR; Tom Ale – PR; Mitchell Barnett – PR, SR; Rocco Berry – CE; Kurt Capewell – SR; Wayde Egan (vc) – HK; Addin Fonua-Blake – PR; Jackson Ford – SR, PR; Tohu Harris (c) – LK; Chanel Harris-Tavita – FE	Shaun Johnson – HB; Edward Kosi – WG; Jacob Laban – SR; Ali Leiataua – CE; Freddy Lussick – HK; Te Maire Martin – FE, HB; Zyon Maiu'u – PR; Luke Metcalf – FE; Marcelo Montoya – WG; Charnze Nicoll-Klokstad – FB, FE	Marata Niukore – SR, PR; Adam Pompey – CE, SR; Demitric Sifakula – PR; Jazz Tevaga – PR; Taine Tuaupiki – FB; Roger Tuivasa-Sheck – CE, FB, WG; Dylan Walker – LK, SR; Dallin Watene-Zelezniak – WG	Ben Farr – FE, FB, HB; Etuate Fukofuka – HK; Leka Halasima – SR; Patrick Moimoi – CE; Tanner Stowers-Smith – PR; Extended squad: Moala Graham-Taufa – CE, WG; Paul Roache – HK, HB	Head coach: Andrew Webster; Assistant coaches: Richard Agar (Backs); Stacey Jones (Halves & Special Plays); Slade Griffin (Forwards); Balin Cupples (High Performance); Kai Kara-France (Wrestling); Daryl Halligan (Goalkicking); David Tangata-Toa (NSW Cup coach); Legend: (c) Captain(s); (vc) Vice-captain(s); Updated: 5 September 2024; Source(s): Warriors Football Department

== Pre-season ==
The Warriors played the Wests Tigers in Christchurch and the Dolphins in Auckland as their pre-season fixtures. Both matches were part of the second edition of the NRL Pre-season Challenge.

Win Draw Loss

Round 1: 18 February 2024	New Zealand Warriors	16–18	Wests Tigers	Christchurch
16:00 NZDT	Tries: Laban 13'; Roache 62'; Tu 65'; Goals: Metcalf 1/1 14'; Farr 1/2 63'; Sent off: Maiu'u (red card) 19'	[Report; Details Report]	Tries: Seyfarth 8'; Sezer 16'; Latoa-Vaihu 57'; Goals: Koroisau 2/2 9', 17'; Lobb 1/2 59'; Sin bin: Sa. Fainu (yellow card) 40' to 50'	Stadium: Apollo Projects Stadium; Attendance: 13,670; Referee: Chris Sutton

Round 2: 24 February 2024	New Zealand Warriors	34–22	Dolphins	Auckland
17:45 AEDT	Tries: Montoya 13'; Barnett 18'; Watene-Zelezniak 26'; Berry 49'; Niukore 61'; Leiataua 78'; Goals: Johnson 4/4 15', 20', 27', 50'; Metcalf 1/2 63'	[Report; Details Report]	Tries: Averillo 32'; Bostock 53'; Farnworth 67'; Te Whare 70'; Goals: Nikorima 1/1 32'; Isaako 1/1 55'; Katoa 1/2 72'	Stadium: Go Media Stadium; Attendance: 14,276; Referee: Liam Kennedy

== Regular season ==
=== League table ===
Pos	Team	Pld	W	D	L	B	PF	PA	PD	Pts	Qualification
1	Melbourne Storm	24	19	0	5	3	692	449	+243	44	Advance to finals series
2	Penrith Panthers (P)	24	17	0	7	3	580	394	+186	40	Advance to finals series
3	Sydney Roosters	24	16	0	8	3	738	463	+275	38	Advance to finals series
4	Cronulla-Sutherland Sharks	24	16	0	8	3	653	431	+222	38	Advance to finals series
5	North Queensland Cowboys	24	15	0	9	3	657	568	+89	36	Advance to finals series
6	Canterbury-Bankstown Bulldogs	24	14	0	10	3	529	433	+96	34	Advance to finals series
7	Manly Warringah Sea Eagles	24	13	1	10	3	634	521	+113	33	Advance to finals series
8	Newcastle Knights	24	12	0	12	3	470	510	−40	30	Advance to finals series
9	Canberra Raiders	24	12	0	12	3	474	601	−127	30	
10	Dolphins	24	11	0	13	3	577	578	−1	28	
11	St. George Illawarra Dragons	24	11	0	13	3	508	634	−126	28	
12	Brisbane Broncos	24	10	0	14	3	537	607	−70	26	
13	New Zealand Warriors	24	9	1	14	3	512	574	−62	25	
14	Gold Coast Titans	24	8	0	16	3	488	656	−168	22	
15	Parramatta Eels	24	7	0	17	3	561	716	−155	20	
16	South Sydney Rabbitohs	24	7	0	17	3	494	682	−188	20	
17	Wests Tigers	24	6	0	18	3	463	750	−287	18	

Source: National Rugby League
(P) Premiers

=== Results by round ===
Round	1	2	3	4	5	6	7	8	9	10	11	12	13	14	15	16	17	18	19	20	21	22	23	24	25	26	27
Ground	H	A	H	H	A	H	A	H	A	A	N	H	–	A	H	A	H	A	–	A	H	H	A	A	H	A	–
Result	L	L	W	W	W	D	L	L	L	L	W	W	B	W	L	L	W	L	B	L	W	L	L	L	L	W	B
Position	10	14	11	10	6	7	10	12	14	14	13	13	13	10	12	13	13	14	12	14	12	13	14	14	14	13	13
Points	0	0	2	4	6	7	7	7	7	7	9	11	13	15	15	15	17	17	19	19	21	21	21	21	21	23	25

Source: National Rugby League
A = Away; H = Home; N = Neutral; B = Bye; W = Win; D = Draw; L = Loss

=== Matches ===
The league fixtures were announced on 13 November 2023.

Win Draw Loss Fixtures

Round 1: 8 March 2024	New Zealand Warriors	12–16	Cronulla-Sutherland Sharks	Auckland
20:00 NZDT	Tries: Fonua-Blake 7'; Metcalf 12'; Goals: Johnson 2/2 9', 13'	[Report Report]	Tries: Ramien 34'; Mulitalo 41'; Talakai 57'; Goals: Trindall 1/1 36'; Hynes 1/2 58'	Stadium: Go Media Stadium; Attendance: 24,076; Referee: Peter Gough

Round 2: 16 March 2024	Melbourne Storm	30–26	New Zealand Warriors	Melbourne
19:35 AEDT	Tries: Warbrick 3'; Meaney 14'; Papenhuyzen 21', 77'; Coates 79'; Goals: Meaney 5/6 5', 15', 18 pen', 77', 79'	[Report Report]	Tries: Watene-Zelezniak 10', 44'; Ford 48'; Montoya 58'; Goals: Metcalf 5/7 12', 50', 56 pen', 64 pen', 71 pen'	Stadium: AAMI Park; Attendance: 21,927; Referee: Chris Butler

Round 3: 22 March 2024	New Zealand Warriors	18–10	Canberra Raiders	Christchurch
20:00 NZDT	Tries: Fonua-Blake 8'; Metcalf 61'; Tuivasa-Sheck 64'; Goals: Metcalf 3/3 10', 63', 66'	[Report Report]	Tries: Timoko 31'; Cotric 51'; Goals: Fogarty 1/2 55'	Stadium: Apollo Projects Stadium; Attendance: 17,249; Referee: Liam Kennedy

Round 4: 31 March 2024	New Zealand Warriors	20–12	Newcastle Knights	Auckland
18:05 NZDT	Tries: Ford 15'; Harris-Tavita 18'; Montoya 43'; Goals: Johnson 4/4 17', 19', 44', 71 pen'	[Report Report]	Tries: Frizell 35'; Best 73'; Goals: Ponga 2/2 36', 74'	Stadium: Go Media Stadium; Attendance: 24,112; Referee: Peter Gough

Round 5: 6 April 2024	South Sydney Rabbitohs	4–34	New Zealand Warriors	Sydney Olympic Park
15:00 AEDT	Tries: Thompson 5'; Goals: L. Mitchell 0/1	[Report Report]	Tries: Berry 8'; Ford 34'; Johnson 36', 47'; Tuivasa-Sheck 61'; Martin 70'; Goals: Johnson 5/6 10', 36', 38', 48', 71'	Stadium: Accor Stadium; Attendance: 13,184; Referee: Liam Kennedy

Round 6: 25 April 2024	New Zealand Warriors	22–22 (g.p.)	Manly Warringah Sea Eagles	Auckland
17:00 NZST	Tries: Tevaga 35'; Watene-Zelezniak 39', 79'; Johnson 52'; Goals: Johnson 3/5 36', 79', 79 pen'	[Report Report]	Tries: Cherry-Evans 9', 23'; Talau 27'; B. Trbojevic 44'; Goals: Cherry-Evans 3/4 10', 24', 45'	Stadium: Go Media Stadium; Attendance: 23,076; Referee: Chris Butler

Round 7: 19 April 2024	St. George Illawarra Dragons	30–12	New Zealand Warriors	Wollongong
18:00 AEST	Tries: Suli 24'; Ravalawa 29'; Hunt 35'; Lomax 40'; Sloan 61'; Goals: Lomax 4/6 36', 42', 53 pen', 63'; Field goals: Lomax 39 (2pt)'	[Report Report]	Tries: Johnson 11'; Watene-Zelezniak 69'; Goals: Johnson 2/2 12', 71'	Stadium: WIN Stadium; Attendance: 13,111; Referee: Gerard Sutton

Round 8: 25 April 2024	New Zealand Warriors	24–27	Gold Coast Titans	Auckland
16:00 NZST	Tries: Nicoll-Klokstad 3'; Fonua-Blake 6', 57'; Berry 62'; Goals: Johnson 4/4 4', 8', 58', 63'	[Report Report]	Tries: Brimson 13', 54'; Boyd 30'; D. Fifita 62'; Khan-Pereira 42'; Goals: Boyd 3/5 14', 32', 38'; Field goals: Boyd 39'	Stadium: Go Media Stadium; Attendance: 23,912; Referee: Wyatt Raymond

Round 9: 5 May 2024	Newcastle Knights	14–8	New Zealand Warriors	Newcastle
14:00 AEST	Tries: Gamble 10'; D. Saifiti 62'; Goals: Gagai 3/3 11', 15 pen', 64'	[Report Report]	Tries: Walker 26'; Goals: Johnson 2/2 28', 53 pen'	Stadium: McDonald Jones Stadium; Attendance: 16,094; Referee: Chris Butler

Round 10: 12 May 2024	Sydney Roosters	38–18	New Zealand Warriors	Moore Park
14:00 AEST	Tries: Young 3', 9'; Crichton 6', 12'; Tupou 44'; Tedesco 52'; Walker 75'; Goals: Walker 5/7 5', 7', 14', 54', 76'	[Report Report]	Tries: Kosi 49'; Nicoll-Klokstad 61'; Fonua-Blake 68'; Goals: Pompey 3/3 50', 62', 69'	Stadium: Allianz Stadium; Attendance: 16,517; Referee: Kasey Badger

Round 11: 19 May 2024	New Zealand Warriors	22–20	Penrith Panthers	Brisbane
13:50 AEST	Tries: Montoya 21'; Leiataua 43'; Pompey 48'; Tuaupiki 70'; Goals: Tuaupiki 3/4 44', 50', 72'	[Report Report]	Tries: Edwards 1'; Luai 30'; Yeo 56'; Tago 66'; Goals: Edwards 2/4 32', 57'; Sin bin: Yeo (yellow card) 42' to 52'	Stadium: Suncorp Stadium; Attendance: 40,472; Referee: Grant Atkins

Round 12: 26 May 2024	New Zealand Warriors	24–20	Dolphins	Auckland
18:05 NZST	Tries: Harris-Tavita 20'; Martin 32'; Watene-Zelezniak 57'; Niukore 66'; Goals: Pompey 4/4 22', 33', 59', 68'	[Report Report]	Tries: Isaako 3', 75'; Farnworth 15'; Tabuai-Fidow 25'; Goals: Isaako 2/4 17', 27'	Stadium: Go Media Stadium; Attendance: 23,116; Referee: Peter Gough

Round 13 (Bye for New Zealand Warriors)

Round 14: 8 June 2024	North Queensland Cowboys	12–42	New Zealand Warriors	Townsville
17:30 AEST	Tries: Drinkwater 37'; Burns 72'; Goals: Holmes 2/2 38', 73'; Sin bin: Townsend (yellow card) 60' to 70'	[Report Report]	Tries: Nicoll-Klokstad 8', 68'; Fonua-Blake 13'; Barnett 18'; Berry 32', 77'; Watene-Zelezniak 52'; Goals: Pompey 7/8 15', 20', 34', 54', 61 pen', 69', 77'; Sin bin: Harris-Tavita (yellow card) 60' to 70'	Stadium: Queensland Country Bank Stadium; Attendance: 19,623; Referee: Ziggy Przeklasa-Adamski

Round 15: 15 June 2024	New Zealand Warriors	24–38	Melbourne Storm	Auckland
19:30 NZST	Tries: Pompey 4'; Montoya 15', 74'; Barnett 45'; Goals: Pompey 3/4 5', 8 pen', 17'; Harris-Tavita 1/1 75'; Sin bin: Montoya (yellow card) 53' to 63'; Watene-Zelezniak (yellow card) 60' to 70'	[Report Report]	Tries: Katoa 19'; Anderson 25'; Ieremia 29'; Meaney 34'; Fa'alogo 54', 78'; Coates 62'; Goals: Meaney 5/7 21', 36', 55', 63', 79'	Stadium: Go Media Stadium; Attendance: 24,495; Referee: Gerard Sutton

Round 16: 22 June 2024	Gold Coast Titans	66–6	New Zealand Warriors	Gold Coast
15:00 AEST	Tries: Khan-Pereira 15', 46', 62', 78'; Fermor 20'; Randall 25'; Palasia 31'; Verrills 39'; Kini 53', 67'; Campbell 56'; Goals: Campbell 11/11 17', 22', 26', 32', 40', 48', 54', 57', 63', 69', 79'	[Report Report]	Tries: Martin 58'; Goals: Pompey 1/1 59'; Sin bin: Tuivasa-Sheck (yellow card) 53' to 63'	Stadium: Cbus Super Stadium; Attendance: 22,702; Referee: Adam Gee

Round 17: 29 June 2024	New Zealand Warriors	32–16	Brisbane Broncos	Auckland
17:00 NZST	Tries: Harris-Tavita 9', 27'; Martin 14'; Tuivasa-Sheck 58'; Watene-Zelezniak 68'; Lussick 72'; Goals: Pompey 3/6 10', 16', 59'; Harris-Tavita 1/1 79 pen'	[Report Report]	Tries: Mariner 30', 51'; Willison 64'; Goals: Staggs 2/3 32', 65'	Stadium: Go Media Stadium; Attendance: 22,711; Referee: Todd Smith

Round 18: 6 July 2024	Canterbury-Bankstown Bulldogs	13–12 (g.p.)	New Zealand Warriors	Sydney Olympic Park
15:00 AEST	Tries: Xerri 19'; Kikau 54'; Goals: Burton 2/2 21', 55'; Field goals: Burton 87'	[Report Report]	Tries: Watene-Zelezniak 22'; Montoya 27'; Goals: Pompey 2/3 29', 40 pen'	Stadium: Accor Stadium; Attendance: 27,223; Referee: Chris Butler

Round 19 (Bye for New Zealand Warriors)

Round 20: 19 July 2024	Canberra Raiders	20–18	New Zealand Warriors	Canberra
20:00 AEST	Tries: Young 5', 10'; Savage 70'; Goals: Fogarty 4/4 6', 11', 18 pen', 71'	[Report Report]	Tries: Tuivasa-Sheck 37'; Capewell 46'; Barnett 59'; Fonua-Blake 72'; Goals: Pompey 1/1 38'; Harris-Tavita 0/3	Stadium: GIO Stadium; Attendance: 8,509; Referee: Todd Smith

Round 21: 26 July 2024	New Zealand Warriors	28–16	Wests Tigers	Auckland
20:00 NZST	Tries: Capewell 9'; Kosi 33'; Leiataua 37'; Fonua-Blake 69'; Watene-Zelezniak 74'; Goals: Harris-Tavita 4/6 38', 61 pen', 71', 76'	[Report Report]	Tries: Papali'i 51'; Staines 55'; Koroisau 79'; Goals: Koroisau 2/3 53', 80'	Stadium: Go Media Stadium; Attendance: 23,976; Referee: Peter Gough

Round 22: 2 August 2024	New Zealand Warriors	20–30	Parramatta Eels	Auckland
20:00 NZST	Tries: Tuivasa-Sheck 29'; Nicoll-Klokstad 70'; Niukore 74'; Watene-Zelezniak 79'; Goals: Johnson 1/4 71'; Harris-Tavita 1/1 79'	[Report Report]	Tries: Tago 17'; Lussick 21'; Asi 35'; Talagi 59'; Gutherson 63'; Goals: Gutherson 5/5 18', 22', 36', 61', 65'; Sin bin: Tago (yellow card) 74' to 80'	Stadium: Go Media Stadium; Attendance: 23,812; Referee: Todd Smith

Round 23: 11 August 2024	Dolphins	34–32 (g.p.)	New Zealand Warriors	Brisbane
14:00 AEST	Tries: Kaufusi 8'; Farnworth 16', 52'; Nikorima 35'; Averillo 70'; Goals: Isaako 6/6 9', 18', 34 pen', 37', 54', 71'; Field goals: O'Sullivan 82 (2pt)'	[Report Report]	Tries: Kosi 21'; Capewell 42'; Leiataua 58'; Martin 64'; Sifakula 67'; Barnett 75'; Goals: Harris-Tavita 4/6 22', 43', 68', 76'; Sin bin: Walker (yellow card) 37' to 47'	Stadium: Suncorp Stadium; Attendance: 28,056; Referee: Wyatt Raymond

Round 24: 16 August 2024	Manly Warringah Sea Eagles	24–10	New Zealand Warriors	Brookvale
18:00 AEST	Tries: Saab 9'; T. Trbojevic 23'; Garrick 53'; Hopoate 68'; Goals: Garrick 4/5 25', 54', 69', 79 pen'	[Report Report]	Tries: Johnson 20'; Watene-Zelezniak 32'; Goals: Metcalf 1/2 34'	Stadium: 4 Pines Park; Attendance: 17,333; Referee: Chris Butler

Round 25: 23 August 2024	New Zealand Warriors	18–34	Canterbury-Bankstown Bulldogs	Auckland
20:00 NZST	Tries: Montoya 9'; Capewell 13'; Egan 38'; Goals: Johnson 3/3 10', 15', 40'	[Report Report]	Tries: Xerri 26'; Crichton 29'; Morrin 34'; Hayes 53'; Addo-Carr 61'; Kiraz 77'; Goals: Burton 5/6 30', 35', 55', 63', 78'	Stadium: Shaun Johnson Stadium; Attendance: 24,295; Referee: Wyatt Raymond

Round 26: 31 August 2024	Cronulla-Sutherland Sharks	28–30	New Zealand Warriors	Cronulla
19:35 AEST	Tries: Wilton 24'; Iro 32'; Stonestreet 34', 68'; Hazelton 37'; Goals: Trindall 4/5 25', 35', 39', 70'; Sin bin: Iro (yellow card) 60' to 70'	[Report Report]	Tries: Metcalf 11'; Watene-Zelezniak 48', 53', 79'; Nicoll-Klokstad 61'; Montoya 64'; Goals: Johnson 3/6 50', 63', 65'	Stadium: PointsBet Stadium; Attendance: 12,637; Referee: Chris Butler

Round 27 (Bye for New Zealand Warriors)

== Player statistics ==
As of 13 April 2024
