= 2025 New Zealand Warriors season =

New Zealand rugby league club season

- NRL Rank: 6th
- Play-off result: Elimination finals
- 2025 record: Wins: 14; draws: 0; losses: 11
- Points scored: For: 525; against: 520

Team information
- CEO: Cameron George
- Coach: (Australia) Andrew Webster
- Captain: Mitch Barnett and James Fisher-Harris
- Stadium: Go Media Stadium (Capacity: 25,000); Apollo Projects Stadium (Capacity: 17,104; round 8 only)
- Avg. attendance: 23,299
- Agg. attendance: 279,593
- High attendance: 26,512 (vs. Canberra Raiders, Round 12)

Top scorers
- Tries: Leka Halasima (13)
- Goals: Luke Metcalf (42)
- Points: Luke Metcalf (117)
← 2024	List of seasons	2026 →

The 2025 New Zealand Warriors season was the 31st season in the club's history and they competed in the National Rugby League (NRL).

Head coach Andrew Webster maintained his club position for the third consecutive season, whilst captain Tohu Harris announced his retirement on 9 January 2025, prior to the club's season beginning. In February, Mitch Barnett and James Fisher-Harris were announced as co-captains.

For the first time, the Warriors played at Allegiant Stadium, Las Vegas, as part of the Rugby League Las Vegas annual event organised by the NRL.

The Warriors qualified for the final series for the tenth time in their history and first time since 2023. In the elimination final on 13 September, the Penrith Panthers defeated the Warriors 24–8 at Go Media Stadium, Auckland, thereby ending the Warriors' season.

The Warriors' reserve-grade team won the New South Wales Cup for the first time, defeating the St George Illawarra Dragons 30–12 in the NSW Cup Grand Final on 28 September. On 5 October, the reserve-grade team won the 2025 NRL State Championship defeating the Burleigh Bears 50–20.

== Squad ==
New Zealand Warriors 2025 squad
Top 30 squad - 2025 NRL season			Supplementary list	Coaching staff
Bunty Afoa – PR; Tom Ale – PR; Mitchell Barnett – PR, LK; Rocco Berry – CE; Tanah Boyd – HB; Kurt Capewell – SR, CE; Erin Clark – LK; Wayde Egan (vc) – HK; James Fisher-Harris – PR; Jackson Ford – PR	Leka Halasima – SR; Morgan Harper – WG, CE; Chanel Harris-Tavita – FE; Sam Healey – HK; Edward Kosi – WG; Jacob Laban – SR; Ali Leiataua – CE; Freddy Lussick – HK, LK; Te Maire Martin – FE; Luke Metcalf – HB	Charnze Nicoll-Klokstad – FB; Marata Niukore – SR; Adam Pompey – CE, WG; Tanner Stowers-Smith – PR; Taine Tuaupiki – WG, FB; Roger Tuivasa-Sheck – WG; Demitric Vaimauga – PR; Dallin Watene-Zelezniak – WG	Kayliss Fatialofa – SR; Kalani Going – LK, PR; Luke Hanson – FE, HB; Eddie Ieremia-Toeava – SR; Patrick Moimoi – CE; Sio Kali – CE; Extended squad: Moala Graham-Taufa – CE	Head coach: Andrew Webster; Assistant coaches: Richard Agar (Backs); Stacey Jones (Halves & Special Plays); Slade Griffin (Forwards); Balin Cupples (High Performance); Kai Kara-France (Wrestling); Daryl Halligan (Goalkicking); David Tangata-Toa (NSW Cup coach); Legend: (c) Captain(s); (vc) Vice-captain(s); Updated: 13 September 2025; Source(s): Warriors Football Department

== Squad changes and contract extensions ==
These movements happened across the previous season, off-season and preseason. Contract extensions occurred either during the preseason or the 2025 NRL season.

=== Transfers in ===
Player	Previous club	Length	Ref.
Tanah Boyd	Gold Coast Titans	2026	
Erin Clark	Gold Coast Titans	2027	
James Fisher-Harris	Penrith Panthers	2028	
Morgan Harper	Parramatta Eels	2025	
Sam Healey	Cronulla-Sutherland Sharks	2027	

=== Transfers out ===
Player	New Club	Ref.
Addin Fonua-Blake	Cronulla-Sutherland Sharks	
Shaun Johnson	Retired	
Zyon Maiu'u	Canterbury-Bankstown Bulldogs	
Marcelo Montoya	Canterbury-Bankstown Bulldogs	
Jazz Tevaga	Manly Warringah Sea Eagles	
Tohu Harris	Retired	
Dylan Walker	Parramatta Eels	

=== Contract extensions ===
Player	Length	Date announced	Ref.
Ali Leiataua	2027	14 October 2024	
Chanel Harris-Tavita	2026	15 October 2024	
Dallin Watene-Zelezniak	2027	18 October 2024	
Jackson Ford	2027	23 October 2024	
Taine Tuaupiki	2026	24 October 2024	
Demitric Vaimauga	2028	10 December 2024	
Eddie Ieremia-Toeava	2026	12 December 2024	
Adam Pompey	2027	18 February 2025	
Charnze Nicoll-Klokstad	2027	23 April 2025	
Leka Halasima	2029	21 May 2025	
Jacob Laban	2029	21 May 2025	
Tanner Stowers-Smith	2028	17 June 2025	
Te Maire Martin	2026	13 August 2025	
Kayliss Fatialofa	2027	19 August 2025	

== Pre-season ==
The Warriors played against the Cronulla-Sutherland Sharks in Cronulla and the Melbourne Storm in Hamilton as their pre-season fixtures. Both matches were part of the third edition of the NRL Pre-season Challenge.

Win Draw Loss

Round 1: 7 February 2025	Cronulla-Sutherland Sharks	12–12	New Zealand Warriors	Cronulla
19:30 AEDT	Tries: Hazelton 2'; H. Puru 74'; Goals: Atkinson 1/1 4'; Hiroti 1/1 76'	[Report Report]	Tries: Nicoll-Klokstad 20'; Tuaupiki 52'; Goals: Metcalf 2/2 22', 53'	Stadium: Sharks Stadium; Referee: Liam Kennedy

Round 2: 15 February 2025	New Zealand Warriors	36–10	Melbourne Storm	Hamilton
15:30 NZDT	Tries: Tuaupiki 2', 15'; Tuivasa-Sheck 9', 18'; Leiataua 24', 27'; Harris-Tavita 37'; Goals: Metcalf 4/6 4', 11', 17', 28'; Tuaupiki 0/1	[Report Report]	Tries: Bradley 52'; Talty 77'; Goals: Russell-Smith 0/1; Morris 1/1 78'	Stadium: FMG Stadium Waikato; Referee: Ziggy Przeklasa-Adamski

== Regular season ==
=== League table ===
Pos	Team	Pld	W	D	L	B	PF	PA	PD	Pts	Qualification
1	Canberra Raiders	24	19	0	5	3	654	506	+148	44	Advance to finals series
2	Melbourne Storm	24	17	0	7	3	671	459	+212	40	Advance to finals series
3	Canterbury-Bankstown Bulldogs	24	16	0	8	3	534	414	+120	38	Advance to finals series
4	Brisbane Broncos (P)	24	15	0	9	3	680	508	+172	36	Advance to finals series
5	Cronulla-Sutherland Sharks	24	15	0	9	3	599	490	+109	36	Advance to finals series
6	New Zealand Warriors	24	14	0	10	3	517	496	+21	34	Advance to finals series
7	Penrith Panthers	24	13	1	10	3	576	469	+107	33	Advance to finals series
8	Sydney Roosters	24	13	0	11	3	653	521	+132	32	Advance to finals series
9	Dolphins	24	12	0	12	3	721	596	+125	30	
10	Manly Warringah Sea Eagles	24	12	0	12	3	555	534	+21	30	
11	Parramatta Eels	24	10	0	14	3	502	578	−76	26	
12	North Queensland Cowboys	24	9	1	14	3	538	684	−146	25	
13	Wests Tigers	24	9	0	15	3	477	612	−135	24	
14	South Sydney Rabbitohs	24	9	0	15	3	427	608	−181	24	
15	St. George Illawarra Dragons	24	8	0	16	3	498	628	−130	22	
16	Gold Coast Titans	24	6	0	18	3	520	719	−199	18	
17	Newcastle Knights	24	6	0	18	3	338	638	−300	18	

Source: National Rugby League
(P) Premiers

=== Results by round ===
Round	1	2	3	4	5	6	7	8	9	10	11	12	13	14	15	16	17	18	19	20	21	22	23	24	25	26	27
Ground	N	H	H	A	–	A	H	H	H	A	A	H	A	A	–	H	A	–	H	A	H	H	A	H	A	H	A
Result	L	W	W	W	B	L	W	W	W	W	W	L	W	W	B	L	L	B	W	W	L	L	L	W	W	L	L
Position	14	11	7	6	4	6	4	4	3	2	2	3	3	3	3	4	4	4	4	4	4	4	5	4	4	6	6
Points	0	2	4	6	8	8	10	12	14	16	18	18	20	22	24	24	24	26	28	30	30	30	30	32	34	34	34

Source: National Rugby League
A = Away; H = Home; N = Neutral; B = Bye; W = Win; D = Draw; L = Loss

=== Matches ===
The league fixtures were released on 21 November 2024.

Win Draw Loss Fixtures

Round 1: 1 March 2025	Canberra Raiders	30–8	New Zealand Warriors	Las Vegas, United States
16:00 PST	Tries: Kris 5', 44'; Savage 26', 31'; Timoko 55'; Goals: Fogarty 5/6 6', 32', 45', 56', 75 pen' Sin bin: Tapine (yellow card) 64' to 74'	Report	Tries: Capewell 36'; Tuivasa-Sheck 71'; Goals: Metcalf 0/2	Stadium: Allegiant Stadium; Attendance: 45,209; Referee: Grant Atkins

Round 2: 14 March 2025	New Zealand Warriors	36–16	Manly Warringah Sea Eagles	Auckland
20:00 NZDT	Tries: Harris-Tavita 18'; Tuaupiki 25'; Leiataua 29'; Egan 49'; Tuivasa-Sheck 70'; Metcalf 79'; Goals: Metcalf 6/6 20', 27', 31', 50', 71', 80'	Report	Tries: T. Trbojevic 3'; Saab 45'; Cherry-Evans 55'; Goals: Garrick 2/4 10 pen', 57'; Sin bin: J. Trbojevic (yellow card) 62' to 72'	Stadium: Go Media Stadium; Attendance: 21,212; Referee: Adam Gee

Round 3: 21 March 2025	New Zealand Warriors	14–6	Sydney Roosters	Auckland
20:00 NZDT	Tries: Leiataua 25', 70'; Harris-Tavita 65'; Goals: Metcalf 1/3 71'	Report	Tries: Whyte 21'; Goals: S. Smith 1/1 22'	Stadium: Go Media Stadium; Attendance: 23,219; Referee: Ashley Klein

Round 4: 30 March 2025	Wests Tigers	24–26	New Zealand Warriors	Campbelltown
20:15 AEDT	Tries: Pole 11'; To'a 38'; Faataape 49'; L. Fainu 52'; Goals: Koroisau 3/3 12', 51', 53'; Da Silva 1/1 39'	Report	Tries: Pompey 4'; Niukore 33'; Metcalf 41'; Halasima 69'; Goals: Metcalf 5/5 6', 34', 43', 71', 72 pen'	Stadium: Campbelltown Sports Stadium; Attendance: 12,020; Referee: Wyatt Raymond

Round 5 (Bye for New Zealand Warriors)

Round 6: 13 April 2025	Melbourne Storm	42–14	New Zealand Warriors	Melbourne
14:00 AEST	Tries: Coates 2', 58'; King 14'; Blore 20'; Loiero 23'; Grant 27'; Anderson 30'; Goals: Papenhuyzen 7/7 3', 15', 21', 24', 29', 31', 60'	Report	Tries: Halasima 54'; Berry 74'; Metcalf 79'; Goals: Metcalf 1/3 55'; Sin bin: Ford (yellow card) 22' to 32'	Stadium: AAMI Park; Attendance: 26,427; Referee: Ashley Klein

Round 7: 19 April 2025	New Zealand Warriors	20–18 (g.p.)	Brisbane Broncos	Auckland
19:30 NZST	Tries: Halasima 30'; Kosi 51'; Metcalf 60'; Niukore 64'; Goals: Metcalf 2/6 31', 81 pen'	Report	Tries: Walters 3'; Arthars 66'; Walsh 73'; Goals: Reynolds 3/3 4', 68', 75'	Stadium: Go Media Stadium; Attendance: 22,395; Referee: Chris Butler

Round 8: 25 April 2025	New Zealand Warriors	26–12	Newcastle Knights	Christchurch
20:05 NZST	Tries: Pompey 8', 71'; Ford 28', 35'; Egan 55'; Goals: Metcalf 2/4 10', 36'; Tuaupiki 1/1 72'; Sin bin: Niukore (yellow card) 1' to 11'	Report	Tries: Schiller 49'; Jones 76'; Goals: Ponga 2/2 50', 77'; Sin bin: Thompson (yellow card) 4' to 14'	Stadium: Apollo Projects Stadium; Attendance: 17,095; Referee: Wyatt Raymond

Round 9: 3 May 2025	New Zealand Warriors	30–26	North Queensland Cowboys	Brisbane
17:30 AEST	Tries: Metcalf 6', 27'; Kosi 11'; Harris-Tavita 22'; Pompey 39'; Goals: Metcalf 5/7 8', 23', 29', 40', 43 pen'	Report	Tries: Purdue 14'; Dearden 32'; Derby 55'; Taulagi 58'; Nanai 62'; Goals: Drinkwater 3/5 15', 33', 64'	Stadium: Suncorp Stadium; Attendance: 49,512; Referee: Adam Gee

Round 10: 10 May 2025	St. George Illawarra Dragons	14–15	New Zealand Warriors	Wollongong
17:30 AEST	Tries: Gutherson 38'; Egan 48'; Allan 51'; Goals: Holmes 1/3 49'	Report	Tries: Metcalf 7'; Tuaupiki 15'; Goals: Metcalf 3/4 8', 11 pen', 30 pen' Field goals: Metcalf 69'	Stadium: WIN Stadium; Attendance: 12,919; Referee: Liam Kennedy

Round 11: 17 May 2025	Dolphins	12–16	New Zealand Warriors	Brisbane
15:00 AEST	Tries: Tabuai-Fidow 71'; Farnworth 77'; Goals: Isaako 2/2 72', 78'	Report	Tries: Niukore 28'; Capewell 35'; Laban 69'; Goals: Metcalf 2/3 36', 70'; Sin bin: Fisher-Harris (yellow card) 76' to 80'	Stadium: Suncorp Stadium; Attendance: 32,165; Referee: Peter Gough

Round 12: 25 May 2025	New Zealand Warriors	10–16	Canberra Raiders	Auckland
18:05 NZST	Tries: Tuivasa-Sheck 23'; Goals: Metcalf 3/3 14 pen', 24', 49 pen' Sin bin: Nicoll-Klokstad (yellow card) 58' to 68'	Report	Tries: Starling 31'; Fogarty 62'; Goals: Fogarty 4/4 32', 40 pen', 59 pen', 64'; Sin bin: Horsburgh (yellow card) 27' to 37'; Starling (yellow card) 77' to 80'	Stadium: Go Media Stadium; Attendance: 26,512; Referee: Adam Gee

Round 13: 1 June 2025	South Sydney Rabbitohs	30–36	New Zealand Warriors	Sydney Olympic Park
14:00 AEST	Tries: Koloamatangi 8'; Johnston 27', 58', 62'; L. Mitchell 75'; Goals: L. Mitchell 5/5 9', 29', 59', 63', 76'	Report	Tries: Watene-Zelezniak 3'; Berry 31'; Nicoll-Klokstad 38'; Halasima 47'; Metcalf 50'; Tuivasa-Sheck 54', 72'; Goals: Metcalf 4/7 39', 48', 55', 74'	Stadium: Accor Stadium; Attendance: 16,237; Referee: Wyatt Raymond

Round 14: 7 June 2025	Cronulla Sutherland Sharks	10–40	New Zealand Warriors	Cronulla
17:30 AEST	Tries: Hiroti 22'; Iro 33'; Goals: Hynes 1/2 23'	Report	Tries: Watene-Zelezniak 5'; Pompey 14'; Fisher-Harris 41'; Vaimauga 54'; Halasima 58'; Harris-Tavita 66', 76'; Goals: Metcalf 6/8 16', 26 pen', 42', 55', 60', 68'	Stadium: Sharks Stadium; Attendance: 13,727; Referee: Peter Gough

Round 15 (Bye for New Zealand Warriors)

Round 16: 21 June 2025	New Zealand Warriors	18–28	Penrith Panthers	Auckland
17:00 NZST	Tries: Ford 20'; Laban 47'; Graham-Taufa 78'; Goals: Metcalf 1/1 21'; Pompey 2/2 48', 79'	Report	Tries: Jenkins 16'; Sorensen 37', 55'; Talagi 62'; Alamoti 69'; Goals: Alamoti 4/6 56', 64', 71', 74 pen'	Stadium: Go Media Stadium; Attendance: 25,012; Referee: Todd Smith

Round 17: 28 June 2025	Brisbane Broncos	26–12	New Zealand Warriors	Brisbane
15:00 AEST	Tries: Staggs 2'; Karapani 14'; Shibasaki 39', 75'; Goals: Reynolds 5/6 3', 24 pen', 39', 51 pen', 76'	Report	Tries: Tuivasa-Sheck 45'; Halasima 65'; Goals: Metcalf 1/1 46'; Pompey 1/1 66'	Stadium: Suncorp Stadium; Attendance: 43,424; Referee: Adam Gee

Round 18 (Bye for New Zealand Warriors)

Round 19: 13 July 2025	New Zealand Warriors	34–14	Wests Tigers	Auckland
16:00 NZST	Tries: Berry 7'; Harris-Tavita 18', 72'; Watene-Zelezniak 32'; Tuivasa-Sheck 49'; Halasima 79'; Goals: Boyd 5/6 9', 19', 50', 74', 80'	Report	Tries: Skelton 1'; Doueihi 27', 56'; Goals: Doueihi 1/3 57'	Stadium: Go Media Stadium; Attendance: 24,112; Referee: Gerard Sutton

Round 20: 20 July 2025	Newcastle Knights	15–20	New Zealand Warriors	Newcastle
16:05 AEST	Tries: Hunt 21'; Gagai 25'; Marzhew 30'; Goals: Hastings 0/2; Gagai 1/2 56 pen' Field goals: Cogger 74'	Report	Tries: Pompey 7'; Vaimauga 49'; Halasima 80'; Goals: Boyd 4/4 8', 50', 67 pen', 80'	Stadium: McDonald Jones Stadium; Attendance: 21,117; Referee: Grant Atkins

Round 21: 26 July 2025	New Zealand Warriors	16–24	Gold Coast Titans	Auckland
17:00 NZST	Tries: Pompey 3'; Halasima 8'; Tuivasa-Sheck 61'; Goals: Boyd 2/3 5', 62'	Report	Tries: Fifita 11', 56'; Sami 14', 47'; Goals: Campbell 4/5 12', 29 pen.', 48', 57'	Stadium: Go Media Stadium; Attendance: 24,212; Referee: Gerard Sutton

Round 22: 1 August 2025	New Zealand Warriors	18–20	Dolphins	Auckland
20:00 NZST	Tries: Watene-Zelezniak 9', 35'; Halasima 58'; Goals: Boyd 3/3 10', 37', 60'	Report	Tries: Farnworth 4'; Marshall-King 25'; Keeley 29'; Isaako 78'; Goals: Isaako 2/4 5', 26'	Stadium: Go Media Stadium; Attendance: 23,012; Referee: Ashley Klein

Round 23: 9 August 2025	Canterbury-Bankstown Bulldogs	32–14	New Zealand Warriors	Sydney
19:35 AEST	Tries: Kikau 21'; Rinakama 31'; Tuala 38', 67'; Crichton 49'; Goals: Crichton 6/8 6 pen.', 16 pen.', 32', 39', 57 pen.', 69'	Report	Tries: Healey 54'; Tuivasa-Sheck 77'; Goals: Pompey 3/3 2 pen.', 55', 78'	Stadium: Accor Stadium; Attendance: 25,377; Referee: Adam Gee

Round 24: 15 August 2025	New Zealand Warriors	14–10	St. George Illawarra Dragons	Auckland
20:00 NZST	Tries: Harris-Tavita 32'; Pompey 62', 72'; Goals: Boyd 1/3 64'	Report	Tries: Feagai 10', 20'; Goals: Flanagan 1/2 22'	Stadium: Go Media Stadium; Attendance: 23,276; Referee: Todd Smith

Round 25: 23 August 2025	Gold Coast Titans	18–32	New Zealand Warriors	Gold Coast
17:30 AEST	Tries: Fa'asuamaleaui 3'; Fermor 73'; Kelly 76'; Goals: Campbell 3/3 4', 74', 76'	Report	Tries: Niukore 6'; Tuivasa-Sheck 16', 20'; Pompey 58'; Ieremia-Toeava 63'; Goals: Boyd 6/6 7', 17', 21', 43 pen.', 60', 65'	Stadium: Cbus Super Stadium; Attendance: 23,271; Referee: Grant Atkins

Round 26: 29 August 2025	New Zealand Warriors	22–26	Parramatta Eels	Auckland
20:00 NZST	Tries: Pompey 19'; Tuivasa-Sheck 55'; Halasima 60', 70'; Goals: Boyd 3/4 57', 62', 71'	Report	Tries: Addo-Carr 3'; Williams 15'; Iongi 49', 63'; Goals: Lomax 5/5 5', 16', 43 pen.', 50', 65'	Stadium: Go Media Stadium; Attendance: 25,012; Referee: Peter Gough

Round 27: 5 September 2025	Manly Warringah Sea Eagles	27–26	New Zealand Warriors	Sydney
18:00 AEST	Tries: Hopoate 4', 15'; Simpkin 9'; Brooks 41'; Bullemor 48'; Goals: Cherry-Evans 3/5 5', 43', 49'; Drop goals: Cherry-Evans 1/1 75'	Report	Tries: Fisher-Harris 0'; Watene-Zelezniak 34', 79'; Nicoll-Klokstad 53'; Healey 72'; Goals: Boyd 3/5 1', 73', 80'	Stadium: 4 Pines Park; Attendance: 17,172; Referee: Todd Smith

== Finals series ==
The Warriors qualified for the final series for the tenth time in their history and first time since 2023.

Elimination final: 13 September 2025	New Zealand Warriors	8–24	Penrith Panthers	Auckland
18:05 NZST	Tries: Halasima 52'; Goals: Boyd 2/2 8 pen.', 53'	Report	Tries: Papali'i 27'; Schneider 46'; McLean 65'; To'o 71'; Goals: Cleary 2/2 28', 47'; Edwards 2/2 66', 72'	Stadium: Go Media Stadium; Attendance: 24,524; Referee: Grant Atkins

== Statistics ==
As of end of season.

Top 5 point scorers

Rank	Player	Tries	Goals	Field goals	Points
1	Luke Metcalf	8	42	1	117
2	Tanah Boyd	0	29	0	58
3	Adam Pompey	11	6	0	56
4	Leka Halasima	13	0	0	52
5	Roger Tuivasa-Sheck	12	0	0	48

Top goal kickers (with more than 5 attempts)

Rank	Player	Goals	Kicking Pct
1	Luke Metcalf	42 / 63	66.7
2	Tanah Boyd	29 / 37	78.4
3	Adam Pompey	6 / 6	100

Top 5 try scorers

Rank	Player	Tries
1	Leka Halasima	13
2	Roger Tuivasa-Sheck	12
3	Adam Pompey	11
4	Chanel Harris-Tavita	8
4	Luke Metcalf	8

Top tacklers

Rank	Player	Tackles
1	Erin Clark	857
2	Wayde Egan	854
3	Jackson Ford	792

== End of season awards ==
=== New Zealand Warriors awards ===
One New Zealand Warriors 2025 awards
Award	Winner
Jersey Flegg Cup Emerging Player of the Year	Caelys Putoko
Jersey Flegg Cup Team Man of the Year	Paea Sikuvea
Jersey Flegg Cup Player of the Year	Jaydee Auloa
New South Wales Cup Team Man of the Year	Geronimo Doyle
New South Wales Cup Players’ Player of the Year	Tanah Boyd
New South Wales Cup Player of the Year	Kalani Going
One New Zealand NRL People's Choice	Leka Halasima
One New Zealand NRL Rookie of the Year	Leka Halasima
NRL Clubman of the Year	Demitric Vaimauga
NRL Players’ Player of the Year	Roger Tuivasa-Sheck
Simon Mannering Medal	Roger Tuivasa-Sheck

=== Dally M Awards ===
2025 Dally M Awards
Award	Player	Outcome
Rookie of the Year Award	Leka Halasima	Nominated
Back Row of the Year Award	Leka Halasima	Nominated
Lock of the Year Award	Erin Clark	Winner
