= 2025 NRL finals series =

- Duration: 12 September – 5 October 2025
- Teams: 8
- Premiers: Brisbane Broncos (7th title)
- Minor premiers: Canberra Raiders (2nd title)
- Matches played: 9
- Broadcast partners: Nine Network; Fox League

The 2025 National Rugby League finals series is a tournament that was staged to determine the winner of the 2025 Telstra Premiership season. The series was played over four weekends in September and October, culminating in the 2025 NRL Grand Final on 5 October 2025.

The top eight teams from the 2025 NRL season qualified for the finals series. NRL finals series were continuously played under this format since 2012.

== Qualification ==
Pos	Team	Pld	W	D	L	B	PF	PA	PD	Pts	Qualification
1	Canberra Raiders	24	19	0	5	3	654	506	+148	44	Advance to finals series
2	Melbourne Storm	24	17	0	7	3	671	459	+212	40	Advance to finals series
3	Canterbury-Bankstown Bulldogs	24	16	0	8	3	534	414	+120	38	Advance to finals series
4	Brisbane Broncos (P)	24	15	0	9	3	680	508	+172	36	Advance to finals series
5	Cronulla-Sutherland Sharks	24	15	0	9	3	599	490	+109	36	Advance to finals series
6	New Zealand Warriors	24	14	0	10	3	517	496	+21	34	Advance to finals series
7	Penrith Panthers	24	13	1	10	3	576	469	+107	33	Advance to finals series
8	Sydney Roosters	24	13	0	11	3	653	521	+132	32	Advance to finals series
9	Dolphins	24	12	0	12	3	721	596	+125	30	
10	Manly Warringah Sea Eagles	24	12	0	12	3	555	534	+21	30	
11	Parramatta Eels	24	10	0	14	3	502	578	−76	26	
12	North Queensland Cowboys	24	9	1	14	3	538	684	−146	25	
13	Wests Tigers	24	9	0	15	3	477	612	−135	24	
14	South Sydney Rabbitohs	24	9	0	15	3	427	608	−181	24	
15	St. George Illawarra Dragons	24	8	0	16	3	498	628	−130	22	
16	Gold Coast Titans	24	6	0	18	3	520	719	−199	18	
17	Newcastle Knights	24	6	0	18	3	338	638	−300	18	

Source: National Rugby League
(P) Premiers

== Finals structure ==
The system used for the 2025 NRL finals series is a final eight system. The top four teams in the eight receive the "double chance" when they play in week-one qualifying finals, such that if a top-four team loses in the first week it still remains in the finals, playing a semi-final the next week against the winner of an elimination final. The bottom four of the eight play knock-out games – only the winners survive and move on to the next week. Home ground advantage goes to the team with the higher ladder position in the first two weeks and to the qualifying final winners in the third week.

In the second week, the winners of the qualifying finals receive a bye to the third week. The losers of the qualifying final plays the elimination finals winners in a semi-final. In the third week, the winners of the semi-finals from week two play the winners of the qualifying finals in the first week. The winners of those matches move on to the Grand Final.

=== Bracket ===
Qualifying and elimination finals
14 September – Canberra
1	Canberra	28
4	Brisbane	29
13 September – Sydney
5	Cronulla-Sutherland	20
8	Sydney	10
13 September – Auckland
6	New Zealand	8
7	Penrith	24
12 September – Melbourne
2	Melbourne	26
3	Canterbury-Bankstown	18

Semi-finals
20 September – Canberra
Canberra	12
Cronulla-Sutherland	32
21 September – Sydney
Canterbury-Bankstown	26
Penrith	46

Preliminary finals
28 September – Brisbane
Brisbane	16
Penrith	14
26 September – Melbourne
Melbourne	22
Cronulla-Sutherland	14

Grand final
5 October – Sydney
Brisbane	26
Melbourne	22

=== Matches ===
Home	Score	Away	Match Information
Home	Score	Away	Date and time (Local)	Venue	Referee	Attendance	Nine viewership
QUALIFYING & ELIMINATION FINALS
Melbourne Storm	26–18	Canterbury-Bankstown Bulldogs	12 September, 19:50	AAMI Park	Adam Gee	22,117	1,010,000
New Zealand Warriors	8–24	Penrith Panthers	13 September, 18:05	Go Media Stadium	Grant Atkins	24,524	665,000
Cronulla-Sutherland Sharks	20–10	Sydney Roosters	13 September, 19:50	Sharks Stadium	Todd Smith	12,842	786,000
Canberra Raiders	28–29	Brisbane Broncos	14 September, 16:05	GIO Stadium	Ashley Klein	25,523	1,054,000
SEMI FINALS
Canberra Raiders	12-32	Cronulla-Sutherland Sharks	20 September, 19:50	GIO Stadium	Grant Atkins	24,322	1,025,000
Canterbury-Bankstown Bulldogs	26-46	Penrith Panthers	21 September, 16:05	Accor Stadium	Ashley Klein	56,872	1,174,000
PRELIMINARY FINALS
Melbourne Storm	22-14	Cronulla-Sutherland Sharks	26 September, 19:50	AAMI Park	Ashley Klein	29,233	1,471,000
Brisbane Broncos	16-14	Penrith Panthers	28 September, 16:05	Suncorp Stadium	Grant Atkins	52,491	1,764,000

==== First Week: Qualifying and Elimination Finals ====
Second Qualifying Final

12 September 2025
19:50 AEST (UTC+10)

Melbourne Storm	26 – 18	Canterbury Bankstown Bulldogs
Tries: 4 Katoa 3'; Lisati 34'; Wishart 65'; Warbrick 76'; Goals: 5 Meaney 4', 23', 35'; Pezet 67', 77'	1st: 14 – 12; 2nd: 12 – 6 Scorecard	Tries: 3 Sexton 20'; Kiraz 29'; Burton 57'; Goals: 3 Burton 21', 31', 59'

AAMI Park, Melbourne
Attendance: 22,117
Referee: Adam Gee

Second Elimination Final

13 September 2025
18:05 NZST (UTC+12)

New Zealand Warriors	8 – 24	Penrith Panthers
Tries: 1 Halasima 52'; Goals: 2 Tanah Boyd 8', 53'	1st: 2 – 6; 2nd: 6 – 18; Scorecard	Tries: 4 Papali'i 27'; Schneider 46'; McLean 65'; To'o 71'; Goals: 4 Cleary 28', 47'; Edwards 66', 72'

Go Media Stadium, Auckland
Attendance: 24,524
Referee: Grant Atkins

First Elimination Final

13 September 2025
19:50 AEST (UTC+10)

Cronulla-Sutherland Sharks	20 – 10	Sydney Roosters
Tries: 3 Mulitalo 34', 39'; Rudolf 75'; Goals: 4 Hynes 35', 39', 69', 76'	1st: 12 – 4; 2nd: 8 – 6 Scorecard	Tries: 2 Nawaqanitawase 23'; Crichton 47'; Goals: 1 Walker 48'

Sharks Stadium, Sydney
Attendance: 12,842
Referee: Todd Smith

First Qualifying Final

14 September 2025
16:05 AEST (UTC+10)

Canberra Raiders	28 – 29	Brisbane Broncos
Tries: 5 Weekes 33', 53'; Young 11'; Sebastian Kris 21'; Strange 55'; Goals: 4 Fogarty 12', 22', 35', 54'	1st: 18 – 12; 2nd: 10 – 16; Scorecard	Tries: 5 Staggs 2'; Mariner 25'; Walsh 65'; Karapani 69'; Shibasaki 72'; Goals: 4 Walsh 3', 27', 73', 80'; Field goals: 1 Hunt 93'

GIO Stadium, Canberra
Attendance: 25,523
Referee: Ashley Klein

==== Second Week: Semi Finals ====
First Semi Final

20 September 2025
19:50 AEST (UTC+10)

Canberra Raiders	12-32	Cronulla-Sutherland Sharks
Tries: 2 Horsburgh 22'; Tamale 45'; Goals: 2 Fogarty 23', 47'	1st: 6-12; 2nd: 6-20; Scorecard	Tries: 5 Mulitalo 34'; Hynes 37'; Burns 52'; Iro 62'; Wilton 73'; Goals: 6 Hynes 35', 38', 54', 59', 64', 74'

GIO Stadium, Canberra
Attendance: 24,322
Referee: Grant Atkins

Second Semi Final

21 September 2025
16:05 AEST (UTC+10)

Canterbury-Bankstown Bulldogs	26-46	Penrith Panthers
Tries: 4 Galvin 16'; Preston 56'; Xerri 61'; Kiraz 77'; Goals: 5 Burton 2', 17', 57', 62', 77'	1st: 8-36; 2nd: 18-10; Scorecard	Tries: 8 To'o 7', 28'; Alamoti 11', 53', 69'; Cleary 21'; Henry 32'; Papali'i 38'; Goals: 7 Cleary 8', 13', 22', 30', 34', 39', 71'

Accor Stadium, Sydney
Attendance: 56,872
Referee: Ashley Klein

==== Third Week: Preliminary Finals ====
First Preliminary Final

26 September 2025
19:50 AEST (UTC+10)

Melbourne Storm	22-14	Cronulla-Sutherland Sharks
Tries: 4 Warbrick 6'; Hughes 15'; Papenhuyzen 35'; Coates 74'; Goals: 3 Meaney 16', 36', 65'	1st: 16-8; 2nd: 6-6; Scorecard	Tries: 3 Katoa 11', 29'; Iro 80'; Goals: 1 Hynes 58'

AAMI Park, Melbourne
Attendance: 29,233
Referee: Ashley Klein

Second Preliminary Final

28 September 2025
16:05 AEST (UTC+10)

Brisbane Broncos	16-14	Penrith Panthers
Tries: 3 Staggs 47'; Willison 69'; Mariner 75'; Goals: 2 Walsh 48'; Reynolds 76'	1st: 0-14; 2nd: 16-0; Scorecard	Tries: 2 Alamoti 10', 35'; Goals: 3 Cleary 12', 29', 36'

Suncorp Stadium, Brisbane
Attendance: 52,491
Referee: Grant Atkins

=== Grand Final ===
2025 NRL Grand Final

Sunday, 5 October
19:30 AEDT (UTC+11)

Melbourne Storm	22-26	Brisbane Broncos
Tries: Nick Meaney 7'; Eliesa Katoa 13'; Will Warbrick 21'; Jahrome Hughes 34'; Goals: Meaney 8', 15', 36'; Sin bin: Loiero	1st: 22-12; 2nd: 0-14	Tries: Deine Mariner 2', 54'; Reece Walsh 30'; Gehamat Shibasaki 45', 57'; Goals: Reynolds 3', 31'; Walsh 58'

Accor Stadium, Sydney
Attendance: 80,223
Referee: Grant Atkins
Video referee: Ashley Klein
Touch judges: Chris Sutton, David Munro
