= Leka Halasima =

Tonga international rugby league footballer (born 2005)

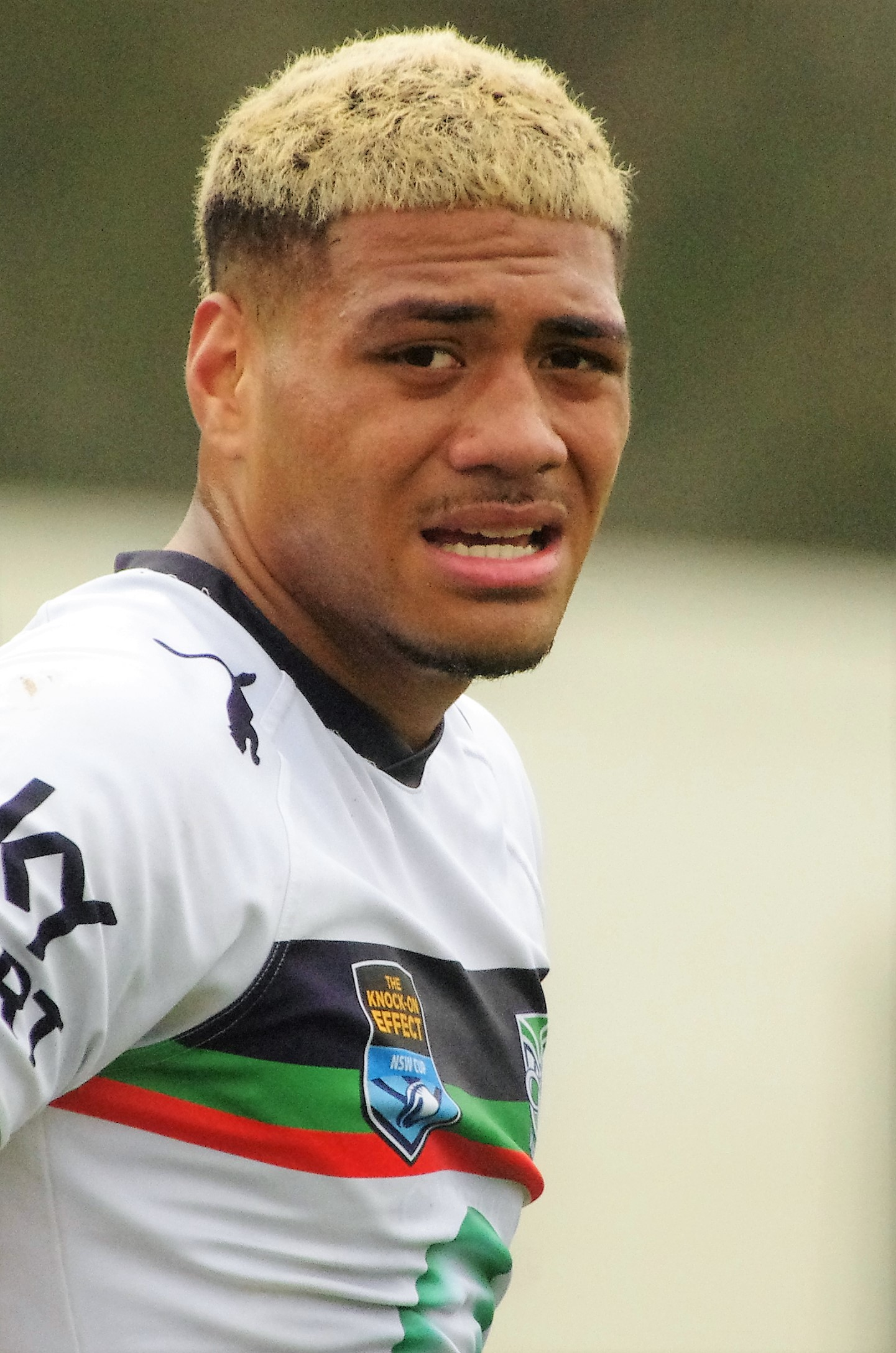

Personal information
- Full name: Selumiela Halasima
- Born: 21 September 2005 (age 21) Tofoa, Tonga
- Height: 185 cm (6 ft 1 in)
- Weight: 100 kg (15 st 10 lb)

Playing information
- Position: Second-row
Club
Years	Team	Pld	T	G	FG	P
2024–	New Zealand Warriors	50	23	0	0	92
Representative
Years	Team	Pld	T	G	FG	P
2025–	Tonga	5	1	0	0	4
- Source: As of 17 November 2026

Selumiela "Leka" Halasima (born 21 September 2005) is a Tongan international rugby league footballer from New Zealand who plays as a second-row forward for the New Zealand Warriors in the National Rugby League.

== Background ==
Halasima was born in Tofoa, Tonga in 2005 and moved to New Zealand as a young child. He was educated at Southern Cross Campus in Auckland, New Zealand. He played junior football for the Māngere East Hawks and the Otahuhu Leopards.

Halasima was also part of the Blues junior pathway in rugby union, being selected for their Under 18's Development Squad in 2022. In January 2022, Halasima played in the Rugby World Sevens with the New Zealand Warriors.

== Playing career ==
=== Early career ===
In 2023, after being named Warriors SG Ball Player of the Year, he progressed up to NSW Cup as a 17 year old. On 18 May 2023, he was signed to a three-year deal with the Warriors.

=== New Zealand Warriors: 2024–present ===
On 6 July 2024, in round 18 of the regular season, Halasima made his NRL debut for the Warriors against the Canterbury-Bankstown Bulldogs at Accor Stadium in a 13–12 loss. During the game, Halasima came onto the field as one of the forwards, but due to injuries to other players was forced to play as a centre. He finished the game with 108 run metres and five tackle breaks.

On 8 July 2024, the Warriors announced that they had re-signed Halasima until the end of 2027 and promoted him into the top 30 squad.

In round 4 of 2025, Halasima scored his first career try against the Wests Tigers, running 70 metres and beating three defenders to score in the 69th minute. His try allowed Luke Metcalf to kick a conversion to tie the match 24–24, before shortly afterwards kicking a successful penalty goal to win the match.

On 21 May 2025, the Warriors announced that Halasima had re-signed with the club until the end of the 2029 season, alongside 21-year-old Jacob Laban.

In round 20, Halasima scored the match-winning try for the New Zealand Warriors in a 20–15 win against the Newcastle Knights. Tanah Boyd attempted a field goal but was charged down — Halasima then picked up the ball and ran 45 metres to score, earning the win for the Warriors.

Halasima finished the 2025 NRL season as the first forward in the club's history to be the top tryscorer in a season. He played 21 games for the New Zealand Warriors in the 2026 NRL season as the club finished second on the table but were eliminated from the finals in straight sets.

== Statistics ==
Stats correct as of end of 2026 season.

=== NRL ===
Season	Team	Matches	Tries	Pts
2024	New Zealand Warriors	4	0	0
2025	New Zealand Warriors	25	13	52
2026	New Zealand Warriors	21	10	40
2027	New Zealand Warriors			
Career totals		50	23	92

== Honours ==
Individual

- New Zealand Warriors S. G. Ball Cup Team Player of the Year: 2023.
- New Zealand Warriors NRL People’s Choice Award: 2025.
- New Zealand Warriors NRL Rookie of the Year: 2025.
