= Jackson Ford =

Australian rugby league footballer (born 1998)

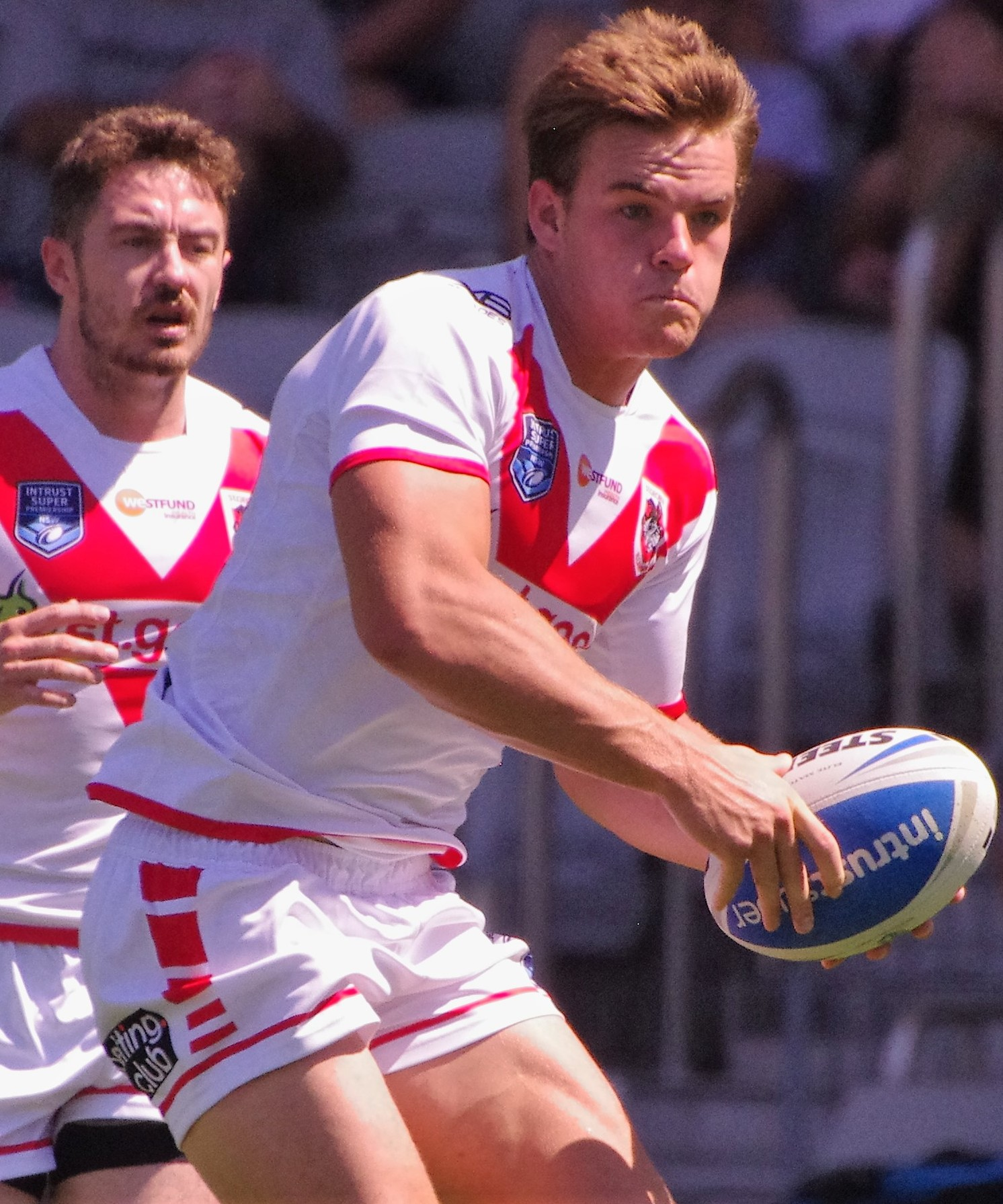

Personal information
- Full name: Jackson Ford
- Born: 17 February 1998 (age 28) Shellharbour, New South Wales, Australia
- Height: 187 cm (6 ft 2 in)
- Weight: 101 kg (15 st 13 lb)

Playing information
- Position: Second-row, Prop, Lock
Club
Years	Team	Pld	T	G	FG	P
2019–22	St. George Illawarra	33	2	0	0	8
2023–	New Zealand Warriors	79	14	1	0	58
	Total	112	16	1	0	66
- Source: As of 22 November 2026

Jackson Ford (born 17 February 1998) is an Australian professional rugby league footballer who plays as a second-row, prop and lock forward for the New Zealand Warriors in the National Rugby League (NRL).

He previously played for the St. George Illawarra Dragons in the NRL.

== Background ==
Ford was born in Shellharbour, New South Wales, Australia.

He played his junior rugby league for the Gerringong Lions in the Group 7 Rugby League.

== Playing career ==
=== 2019 ===
In Round 20 of the 2019 Canterbury Cup NSW competition, Ford scored 4 tries as St George Illawarra defeated the Wentworthville Magpies 36–16 at Kogarah Oval. After this performance, Ford was called into the first grade team.

Ford made his first grade debut for St George Illawarra against the Gold Coast Titans in round 21 of the 2019 NRL season which ended in a 40–28 victory. The following week against Cronulla-Sutherland, Ford scored his first try in the top grade as St George Illawarra lost the match 18–12 at Shark Park.

On 29 September 2019, Ford was named in the 2019 Canterbury Cup NSW team of the season for his performances throughout the year as St George Illawarra finished as the competition's minor premiers.

=== 2020 ===
Ford played a total of 12 games for St. George Illawarra in the 2020 NRL season as the club missed out on the finals.

=== 2021 & 2022 ===
Ford played a total of 11 matches for St. George Illawarra in the 2021 NRL season as the club finished 11th on the table and missed out on the finals, he made his long awaited return in the Round 24 win over the Wests Tigers scoring a try running 11 times for over 125 metres 20 tackles and an offload in the 37 minute stint. In September 2022, Ford was announced to have signed with the New Zealand Warriors on a two-year deal, starting in 2023.

=== 2023 ===
Ford played 24 games with the New Zealand Warriors in the 2023 NRL season as the club finished 4th on the table and qualified for the finals. Ford played in all three finals games as the club reached the preliminary final stage before being knocked out by Brisbane.

=== 2024 ===
Ford played 19 games for the New Zealand Warriors in the 2024 NRL season which saw the club finish 13th on the table. On 23 October 2024, it was announced that Ford had signed a two-year extension.

=== 2025 ===
In round 8 of the 2025 NRL season, Ford scored two tries for New Zealand in their 26–12 victory over Newcastle. Ford played 21 matches with New Zealand in the 2025 NRL season as the club finished 6th on the table and qualified for the finals. They were eliminated by Penrith in the first week of the finals.

=== 2026 ===
On 5 August 2026, the Auckland based outfit announced Ford had been re-signed with the New Zealand-based club until the end of the 2029 season. Ford played 15 games for the New Zealand Warriors in the 2026 NRL season as the club finished second on the table but were eliminated from the finals in straight sets.

== Statistics ==
Season	Team	Pld	T	G	FG	P
2019	St. George Illawarra Dragons	5	1	0	0	4
2020	St. George Illawarra Dragons	12	0	0	0	0
2021	St. George Illawarra Dragons	11	0	0	0	0
2022	St. George Illawarra Dragons	5	1	0	0	4
2023	New Zealand Warriors	24	4	0	0	16
2024	New Zealand Warriors	19	3			12
2025	New Zealand Warriors	21	3			12
2026	New Zealand Warriors	15	4	1		18
2027	New Zealand Warriors					
	Totals	112	16	1	0	66
