= Rocco Berry =

New Zealand rugby league footballer

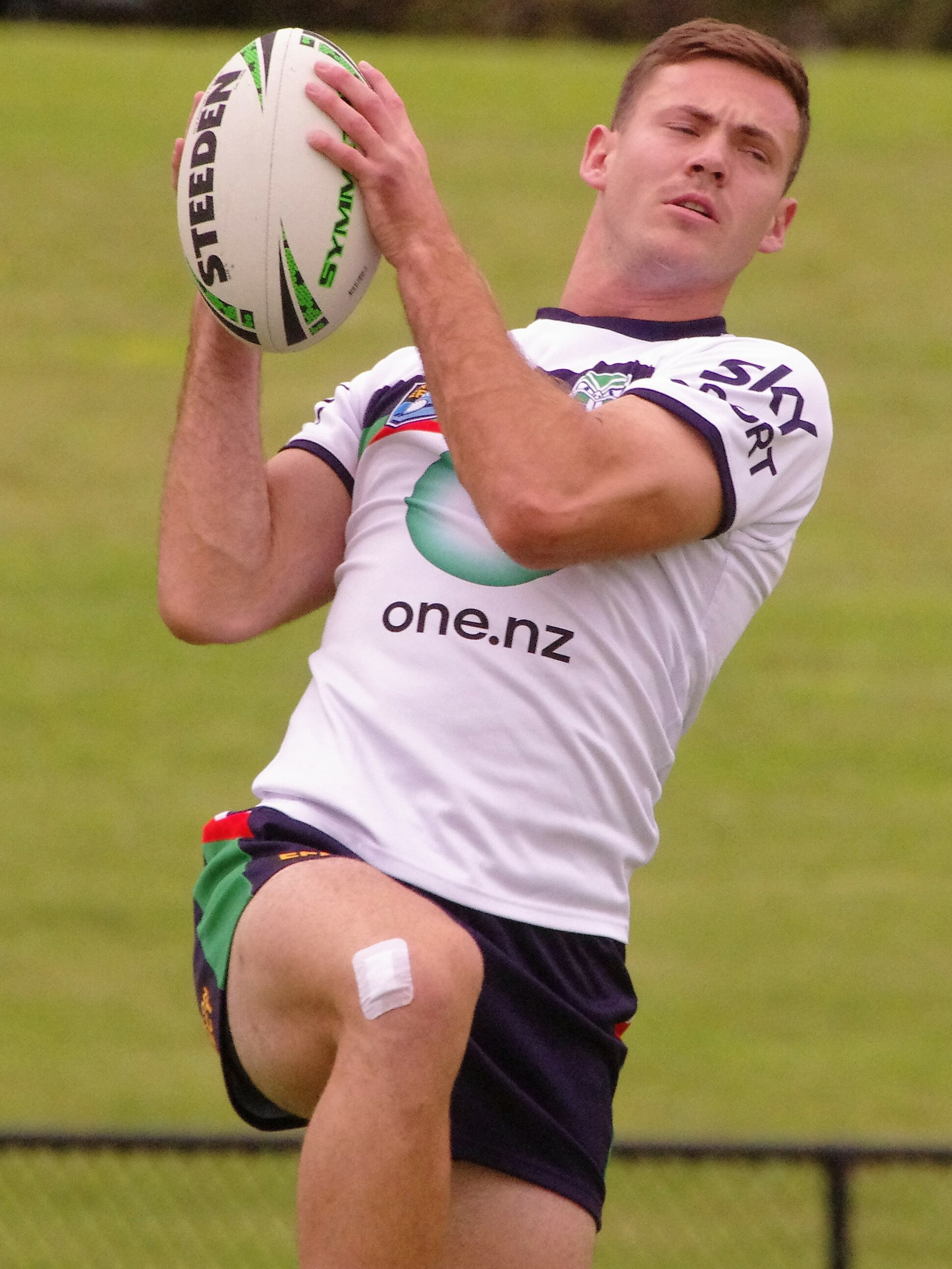

Personal information
- Born: 17 May 2001 (age 25) Masterton, New Zealand
- Height: 191 cm (6 ft 3 in)
- Weight: 96 kg (15 st 2 lb)

Playing information
- Position: Centre, Wing, Fullback
Club
Years	Team	Pld	T	G	FG	P
2021–26	New Zealand Warriors	52	13	0	0	52
- Source: As of 5 September 2025
- Father: Marty Berry

Rocco Berry (born 17 May 2001) is a New Zealand professional rugby league footballer who plays as a centre or winger for the New Zealand Warriors in the National Rugby League (NRL).

== Background ==
He is the son of former All Black, Marty Berry.

== Playing career ==
=== 2021 ===
Berry made his first grade debut in round 7 of the 2021 NRL season, for the New Zealand Warriors against Melbourne. Berry scored his first try in the NRL a week later against North Queensland.

=== 2022 ===
Berry played a total of seven games for the New Zealand club in the 2022 NRL season as they finished 15th on the table.

=== 2023 ===
Berry played 16 games for the New Zealand Warriors in the 2023 NRL season as the club finished 4th on the table and qualified for the finals. Berry played in all three finals games as the club reached the preliminary final stage before being knocked out by Brisbane.

=== 2024 ===
In round 14 of the 2024 NRL season, Berry scored two tries for New Zealand in their 42–12 win over North Queensland.

In round 15 during the New Zealand Warriors 24–38 loss against the Melbourne Storm, Berry was forced off the field after suffering a shoulder injury in the 37th minute.

Berry played 12 matches for the New Zealand Warriors in the 2024 NRL season which saw the club finish 13th on the table.

=== 2025 ===
Berry was limited to just nine appearances with New Zealand in the 2025 NRL season as the club finished 6th on the table and qualified for the finals. They were eliminated by Penrith in the first week of the finals.

=== 2026 ===
On 8 October 2026, the Warriors announced that Berry had re-signed with the club for a further year.

== Statistics ==
As of 13 September 2025.

Year	Team	Games	Tries	Points
2021	New Zealand Warriors	8	3	12
2022	New Zealand Warriors	7		
2023	New Zealand Warriors	16	3	12
2024	New Zealand Warriors	12	4	16
2025	New Zealand Warriors	9	3	12
2027	New Zealand Warriors			
	Totals	52	13	48
