= Tom Ale =

New Zealand rugby league footballer

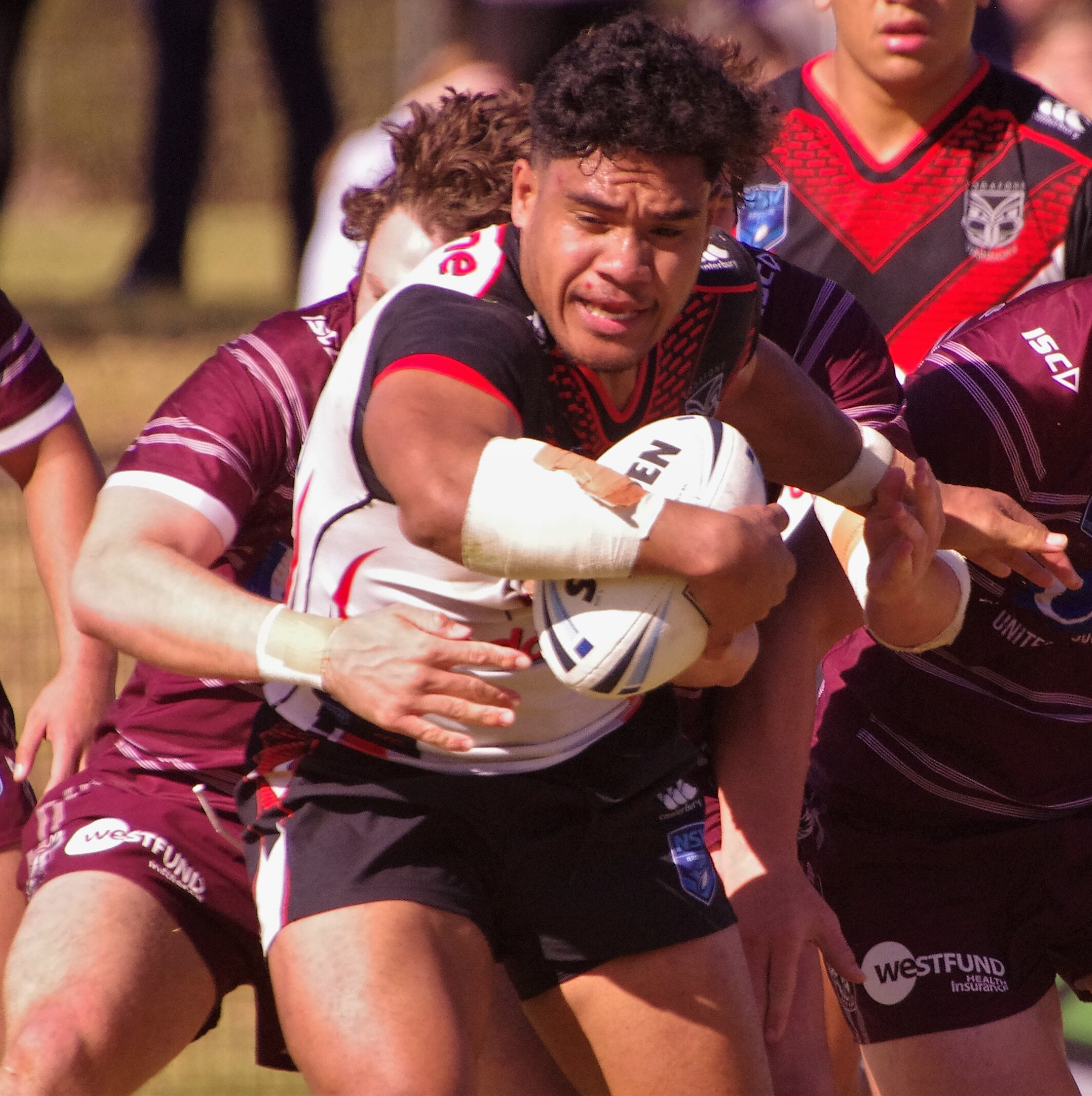

Personal information
- Full name: Thomas Ale
- Born: 1 April 1999 (age 27) Auckland, New Zealand
- Height: 184 cm (6 ft 0 in)
- Weight: 109 kg (17 st 2 lb)

Playing information
- Position: Prop
Club
Years	Team	Pld	T	G	FG	P
2020–25	New Zealand Warriors	42	1	0	0	4
2026–	Penrith Panthers	0	0	0	0	0
	Total	42	1	0	0	4
- Source: As of 20 July 2025

Tom Ale (born 1 April 1999) is a professional rugby league footballer who plays prop for the Penrith Panthers in the National Rugby League (NRL).

== Playing career ==
Ale made his first grade debut in round 19 of the 2020 NRL season for the New Zealand Warriors against the Canberra Raiders.

On 27 January 2023, Ale signed a three-year contract with the Warriors until the end of the 2025 season.

Ale played 19 games for the New Zealand Warriors in the 2023 NRL season as the club finished 4th on the table and qualified for the finals. Ale played 16 games for the New Zealand Warriors in the 2024 NRL season which saw the club finish 13th on the table.

=== 2025 ===
Ale was one of five players that were released by the New Zealand Warriors at the end of their season. On 28 September, he played in New Zealand's 30-12 NSW Cup Grand Final victory over St. George Illawarra. On 31 October, Penrith announced Ale had signed with them for the 2026 season.

=== 2026 ===
In September, Ale played for Penrith's NSW Cup team in their Grand Final victory over Newtown.

== Statistics ==
As of 20 July 2025.

=== NRL ===
Season	Team	Matches	Tries	Pts
2020	New Zealand Warriors	1	0	0
2021	New Zealand Warriors	2	0	0
2022	New Zealand Warriors	4	0	0
2023	New Zealand Warriors	19	1	4
2024	New Zealand Warriors	16	0	0
2026	Penrith Panthers	0	0	0
Career totals		42	1	4
