= Luke Metcalf =

Australian professional rugby league footballer

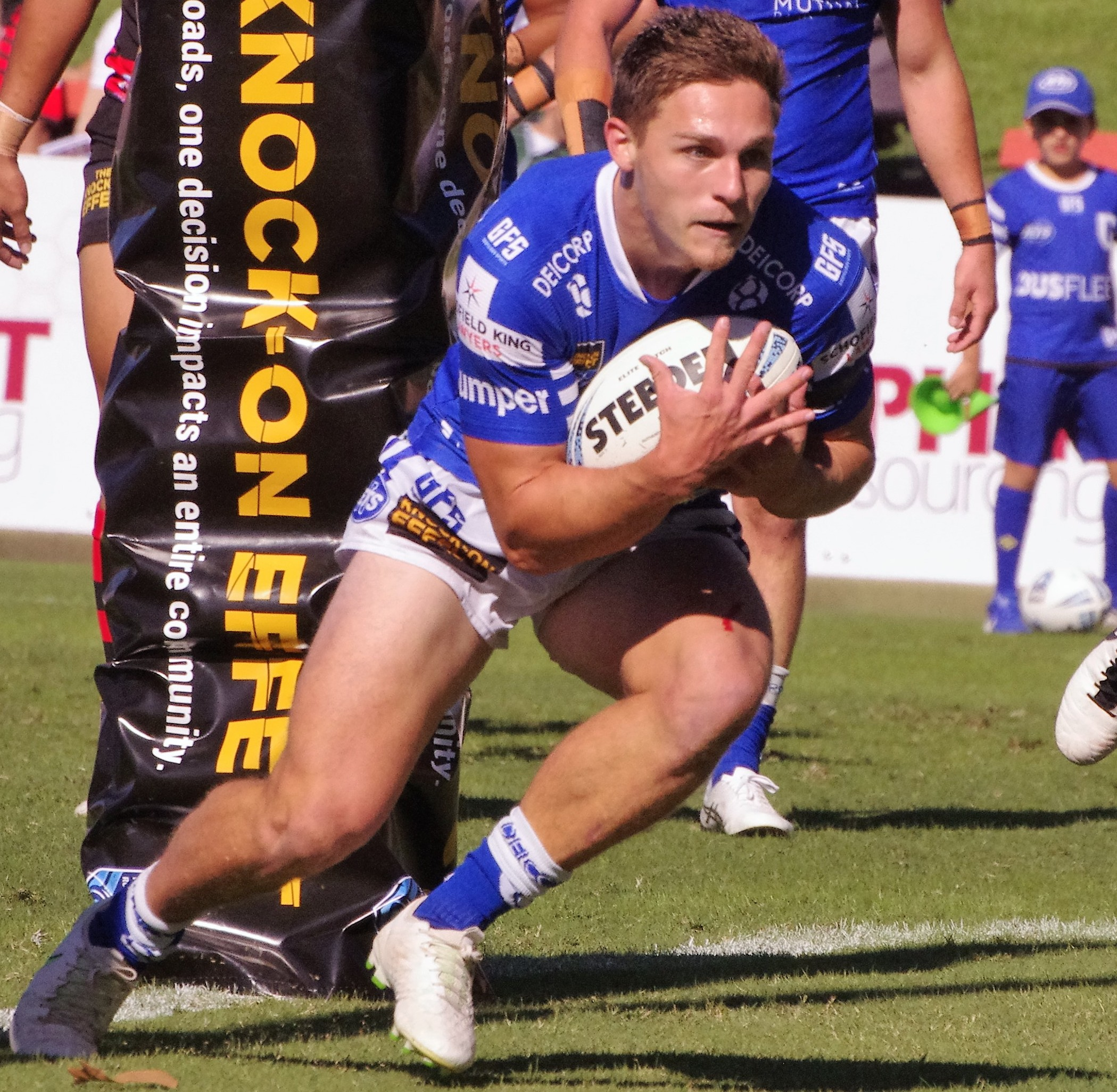

Personal information
- Born: 1 March 1999 (age 27) Coffs Harbour, New South Wales, Australia
- Height: 183 cm (6 ft 0 in)
- Weight: 86 kg (13 st 8 lb)

Playing information
- Position: Five-eighth, Halfback
Club
Years	Team	Pld	T	G	FG	P
2021–22	Cronulla Sharks	7	3	0	0	12
2023–26	New Zealand Warriors	38	19	58	1	193
2027-	St George Illawarra	0	0	0	0	0
	Total	45	22	58	1	205
- Source: As of 15 August 2026

Luke Metcalf (born 1 March 1999) is an Australian professional rugby league footballer who plays as a halfback for the St. George Illawarra Dragons in the National Rugby League (NRL).

He previously played for the Cronulla-Sutherland Sharks and the New Zealand Warriors in the NRL.

== Early life ==
Luke Metcalf played his junior rugby league with Orara Valley Axemen.

== Playing career ==
=== 2021 and 2022 ===
In round 20 of the 2021 NRL season, Metcalf made his debut for Cronulla against the Manly-Warringah Sea Eagles in the "Battle of the beaches" game which ended in a 22-40 defeat. In round 23 against the Wests Tigers, Metcalf scored two tries for Cronulla in a 50-20 victory. On 15 November 2021, the New Zealand Warriors announced they had signed Metcalf on a two-year deal commencing in 2023. Metcalf made only one appearance for Cronulla in the 2022 NRL season in round 25 against Newcastle scoring a try during the 38-16 victory.

=== 2023 ===
In round 13 of the 2023 NRL season, Metcalf made his club debut for the Warriors in the 22-26 loss against the Brisbane Broncos. In round 19 of the 2023 NRL season, Metcalf scored two tries for New Zealand in their 46-10 victory over an understrength Parramatta side. Metcalf played 12 games for the New Zealand Warriors in the 2023 NRL season as the club finished 4th on the table and qualified for the finals.

=== 2024 ===
In round 4 of the 2024 NRL season, Metcalf broke his leg while trying to tackle front rower Tyson Frizell. Metcalf was limited to only seven appearances with New Zealand in the 2024 season as they missed the finals.

=== 2025 ===
In round 7 of the 2025 NRL season, Metcalf kicked a 50 metre penalty goal during golden point extra-time to win the match for the New Zealand Warriors over Brisbane 20-18. In round 9, Metcalf scored two tries and kicked five goals in New Zealand's 30-26 victory over North Queensland. On 30 June, it was announced that Metcalf would miss the rest of the 2025 NRL season after suffering an ACL injury. On 23 October, the Warriors announced that Metcalf had re-signed with the club until the end of 2028.

=== 2026 ===
On 14 May 2026, Metcalf signed a 3-year deal with the St. George Illawarra Dragons starting in 2027.

== Statistics ==
=== NRL ===
Season	Team	Matches	Wins	Loss	T	G	GK %	F/G	Pts
2021	Cronulla-Sutherland	6	2	4	2	0	—	0	8
2022	Cronulla-Sutherland	1	1	0	1	0	—	0	4
2023	New Zealand Warriors	12	10	2	6	1	100.00%	0	26
2024	New Zealand Warriors	7	3	4	3	9	75.00%	0	30
2025	New Zealand Warriors	15	10	3	8	42	65.57%	1	117
2026	New Zealand Warriors	4			2				20
Career totals		45	26	13	22	58	67.57%	1	205
