= Tanner Stowers-Smith =

New Zealand rugby league footballer

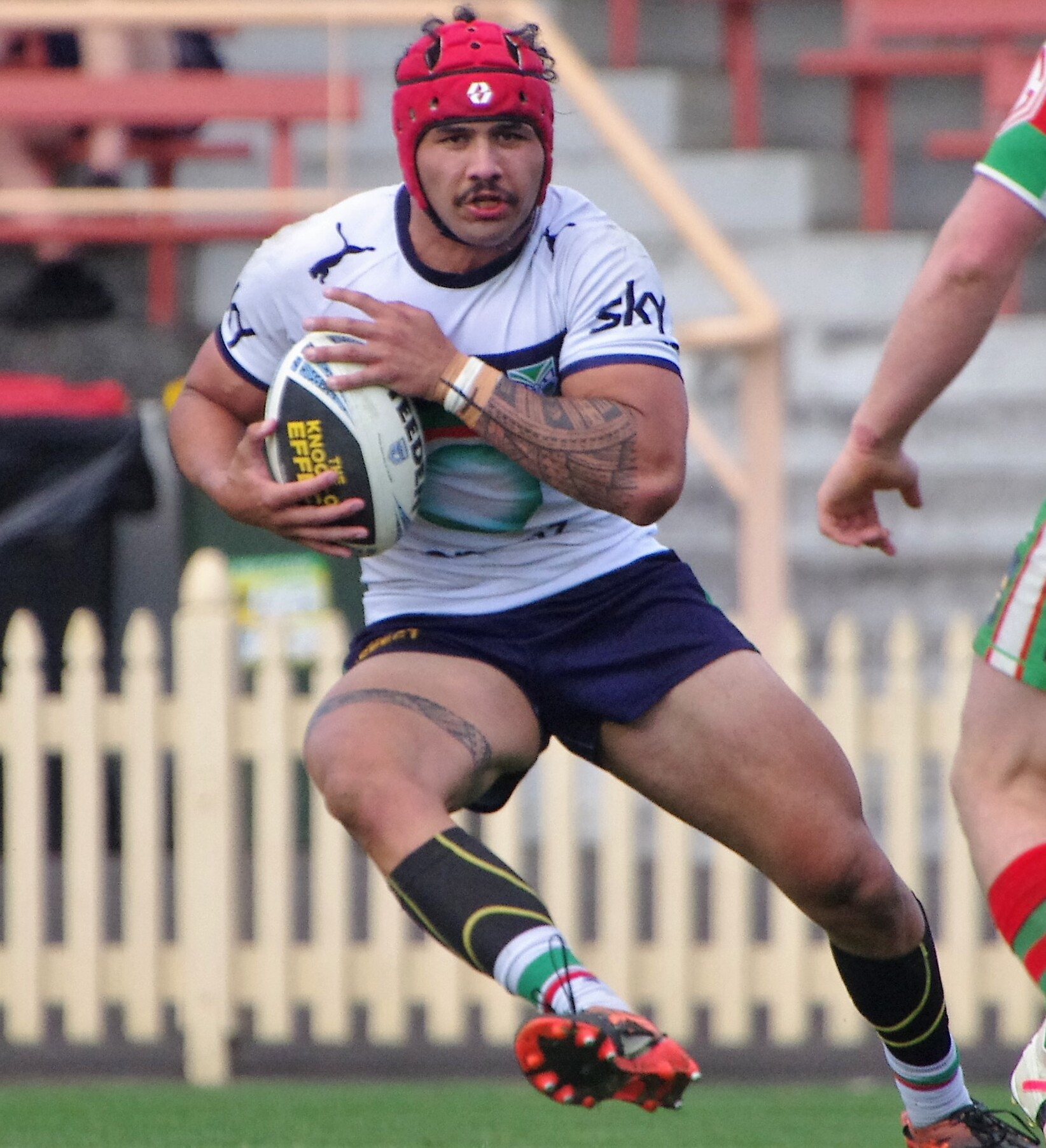

Personal information
- Full name: Tanner Stowers-Smith
- Born: 3 March 2004 (age 22) Christchurch, New Zealand
- Height: 186 cm (6 ft 1 in)
- Weight: 95 kg (14 st 13 lb)

Playing information
- Position: Prop
Club
| Years | Team | Pld | T | G | FG | P |
|---|---|---|---|---|---|---|
| 2025– | New Zealand Warriors | 34 | 0 | 0 | 0 | 0 |
Representative
| Years | Team | Pld | T | G | FG | P |
| 2026– | New Zealand | 1 | 2 | 0 | 0 | 8 |
- Source: As of 6 November 2026

Tanner Stowers-Smith (born 3 March 2004) is a New Zealand rugby league footballer who plays as prop for the New Zealand Warriors in the National Rugby League.

== Playing career ==
=== 2022 ===
In October 2022 Stowers-Smith played in the NZRL Youth Competition. On 2 November 2022, Stowers-Smith was one of 36 players chosen to train with the SG Ball side ahead of the 2023 season. In early 2023, Stowers-Smith would join the Warriors SG Ball team. October 2023, Stowers-Smith was selected in the end of season internationals for the Kiwis A side.

=== 2024 ===
On 8 August 2024, Stowers-Smith had re-signed with the New Zealand Warriors on a development contract for the 2025 season. On 20 February 2025, Stowers-Smith was elevated into the Warriors Top 30 squad and his contracted was upgraded until the end of the season.

=== 2025 ===
In Round 11 of the 2025 NRL season, Stowers-Smith made his NRL debut in the New Zealand Warriors win against the Dolphins. On 17 June, the New Zealand Warriors announced that Stowers-Smith re-signed with the club until the end of the 2028 season. On 28 September 2025, he played in New Zealand's 30-12 NSW Cup Grand Final victory over St. George Illawarra.

=== 2026 ===
On 2 September 2026, the New Zealand Warriors announced that Stowers-Smith extended his contract with the club until the end of 2030. He played 21 games for the New Zealand Warriors in the 2026 NRL season as the club finished second on the table but were eliminated from the finals in straight sets.

He made his New Zealand international début in the 2026 Rugby League World Cup 82-16 win over Cook Islands on 25 October 2026, scoring 2 tries.
