= Samuel Healey =

Australian rugby league player

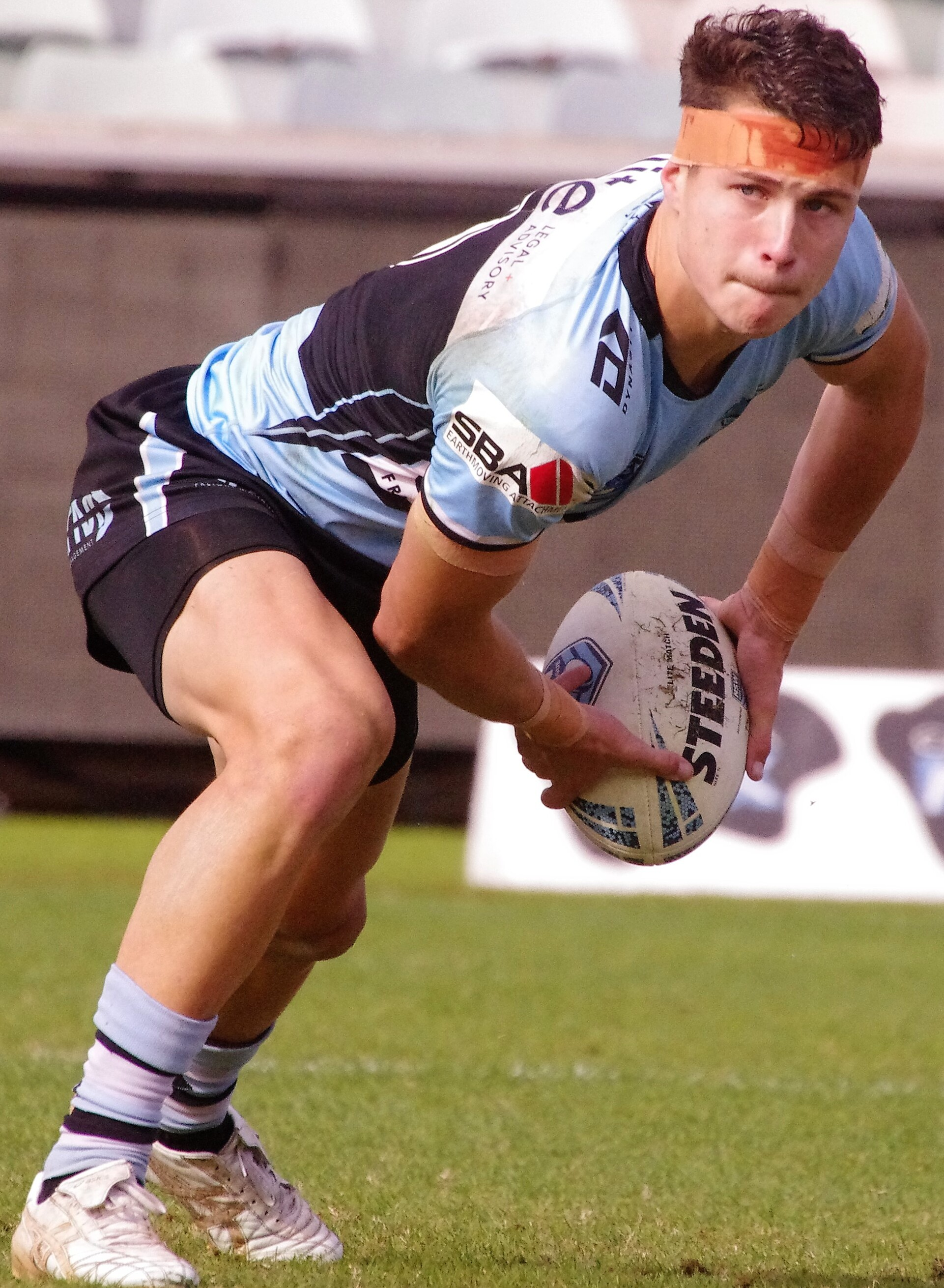

Personal information
- Full name: Samuel Healey
- Born: 30 July 2002 (age 24) Pontefract, England
- Height: 186 cm (6 ft 1 in)
- Weight: 89 kg (14 st 0 lb)

Playing information
- Position: Hooker
Club
Years	Team	Pld	T	G	FG	P
2025–	New Zealand Warriors	29	4	0	0	16
- Source: As of 17 November 2026
- Father: Mitch Healey

Samuel Healey (born 30 July 2002) is an England-born Australian rugby league footballer who plays as a hooker for the New Zealand Warriors in the National Rugby League (NRL).

== Background ==
Son of former Cronulla player Mitch Healey, Samuel was born in England while his dad finished his career playing for the Castleford Tigers. He started his career in the Cronulla Sharks junior system, playing for the Harold Matthews and SG Ball teams, before moving into their NSW Cup feeder team the Newtown Jets.

== Career ==
At the end of 2024, Healey signed a three-year deal to join the New Zealand Warriors until the end of 2027. In round 9 of the 2025 NRL season, Healey made his NRL debut for the New Zealand Warriors against the North Queensland Cowboys during Magic Round. Coming off the bench in a 30–26 win. Healey played 22 games for the New Zealand Warriors in the 2026 NRL season as the club finished second on the table but were eliminated from the finals in straight sets.

On 17 November 2026, the Dragons announced that they had signed Healy from 2028 on a two-year deal.
