= Deine Mariner =

Samoa international rugby league player

Personal information
- Born: 25 April 2003 (age 23) Auckland, New Zealand
- Height: 185 cm (6 ft 1 in)
- Weight: 89 kg (14 st 0 lb)

Playing information
- Position: Wing, Centre
Club
Years	Team	Pld	T	G	FG	P
2022–	Brisbane Broncos	64	38	0	0	152
Representative
Years	Team	Pld	T	G	FG	P
2024–	Samoa	6	4	0	0	16
- Source: As of 6 November 2026
- Relatives: Caleb Clarke (cousin)

Deine Mariner (born 25 April 2003) is a Samoa international rugby league footballer who plays as a winger or centre for the Brisbane Broncos in the National Rugby League, with whom he won the 2025 NRL Grand Final.

== Background ==
Mariner's father, Lapi, is a musician. Mariner's background is of Samoan, Tongan, English (William Charles Mariner), American Samoan and Dutch descent. Mariner was selected for the Australian Schoolboys team in 2021; however, due to COVID-19 pandemic in Australia, no matches were played. Mariner is first cousins with All Blacks Winger Caleb Clarke.

== Career ==
=== 2022 ===
Mariner made his first grade debut for Brisbane against Wests Tigers in round 20 of the 2022 NRL season.

=== 2023 ===
During Brisbane's game against the New Zealand Warriors in round 13 of the 2023 season, Mariner scored two tries - his first points in the NRL - while playing on the wing. In round 24, Mariner scored two tries for Brisbane in their 54-10 victory over Parramatta. Mariner played four games with Brisbane throughout the season scoring five tries.

=== 2024 ===
In round 2 of the 2024 NRL season, Mariner scored two tries for Brisbane in their 28-18 victory over South Sydney. In round 15, Mariner scored two tries for Brisbane in their 22-12 upset loss against South Sydney. In round 20, Mariner scored two tries for Brisbane in their 30-14 victory over Newcastle. Mariner played 21 games for Brisbane in the 2024 NRL season and scored 17 tries which saw the club miss the finals finishing 12th on the table.

=== 2025 ===
In round 8 of the 2025 NRL season, Mariner scored two tries and was also sin binned in Brisbane's 42-18 victory over Canterbury. In week three of the 2025 NRL finals series, Mariner scored the match winning try in a 16-14 win over the Penrith Panthers, ending their four-year dynasty. Mariner played 19 matches for Brisbane, including the clubs 26-22 victory against the Melbourne Storm in the 2025 NRL Grand Final, where he scored two tries

=== 2026 ===
On 19 February, Mariner played in Brisbane's World Club Challenge loss against Hull Kingston Rovers. During Brisbane's round 9 loss to the Sydney Roosters, Mariner hours after the match was rushed to hospital after suffering from Compartment syndrome in his thigh, he required 'limb saving surgery' and would be ruled out indefinitely. On 20 May, Mariner had returned to Brisbane training after requiring multiple operations to close the wound on his leg. Mariner played 17 games for Brisbane in the 2026 NRL season as the club finished 14th on the table.

== Statistics and Honours ==
Year	Team	Games	Tries	Pts
2022	Brisbane Broncos	2		
2023	Brisbane Broncos	4	5	20
2024	Brisbane Broncos	21	17	68
2025	Brisbane Broncos	19	12	48
2026	Brisbane Broncos	18	4	16
2027	Brisbane Broncos			
	Totals	64	38	152

=== Honours ===
Individual

- Brisbane Broncos Top Try Scorer: 2024

Team

- NRL Pre-Season Challenge Winner: 2024, 2025
- NRL Grand Finalist: 2025
