= Demitric Vaimauga =

Tonga international rugby league footballer

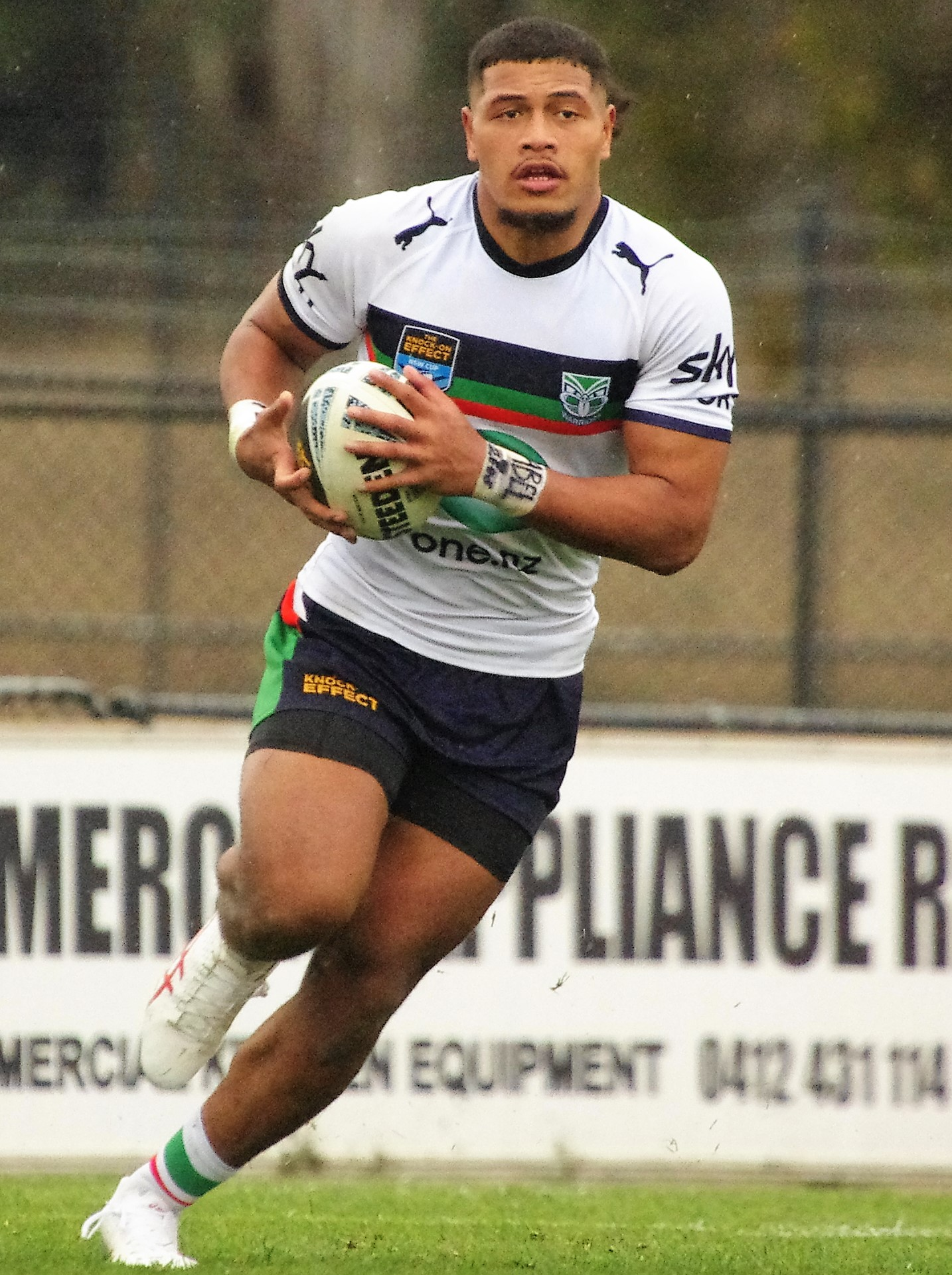

Personal information
- Full name: Demitric Vaimauga
- Born: 15 March 2004 (age 22) Auckland, New Zealand
- Height: 183 cm (6 ft 0 in)
- Weight: 104 kg (16 st 5 lb)

Playing information
- Position: Second-row, Lock
Club
Years	Team	Pld	T	G	FG	P
2023–	New Zealand Warriors	53	4	0	0	16
Representative
Years	Team	Pld	T	G	FG	P
2025–	Tonga	5	1	0	0	4
- Source: As of 7 November 2026

Demitric Vaimauga (né Sifakula; born 15 March 2004) is a Tonga international rugby league footballer who plays as a second-row, prop and lock for the New Zealand Warriors in the National Rugby League (NRL).

== Background ==
Vaimauga was born in Auckland, New Zealand. He is of Tongan, Samoan and Niuean descent. He was educated at De La Salle College, Māngere East. He was an Otahuhu Leopards junior.

== Playing career ==
Vaimauga was first signed by the New Zealand Warriors in 2019 as a 15-year-old from the Otahuhu Leopards. In 2023, after impressive performances in the lower grades, and in the Warriors opening trial fixture, Vaimauga was upgraded to a top 30 contract and re-signed until the end of 2025.

Vaimauga made his first grade debut in his side's 14−0 loss to the Sydney Roosters at Mount Smart Stadium in round 9 of the 2023 NRL season. In his second match against the Penrith Panthers, Vaimauga was sent to the sin bin by referee Todd Smith for apparently striking Penrith's Nathan Cleary. Vaimauga was not charged by the NRL match review over the incident.

On 10 December 2024, the New Zealand Warriors announced that Vaimauga had re-signed with the club until the end of 2028. He played 24 games with New Zealand in the 2025 NRL season as the club finished 6th on the table and qualified for the finals. They were eliminated by Penrith in the first week of the finals. He featured in 22 games for the New Zealand Warriors in the 2026 NRL season as the club finished second on the table but were eliminated from the finals in straight sets.

== Statistics ==
Year	Team	Games	Tries	Pts
2023	New Zealand Warriors	3		
2024	New Zealand Warriors	4	1	4
2025	New Zealand Warriors	24	2	8
2026	New Zealand Warriors	22	1	4
2027	New Zealand Warriors			
	Totals	53	4	16
