= Adam Pompey =

New Zealand rugby league footballer

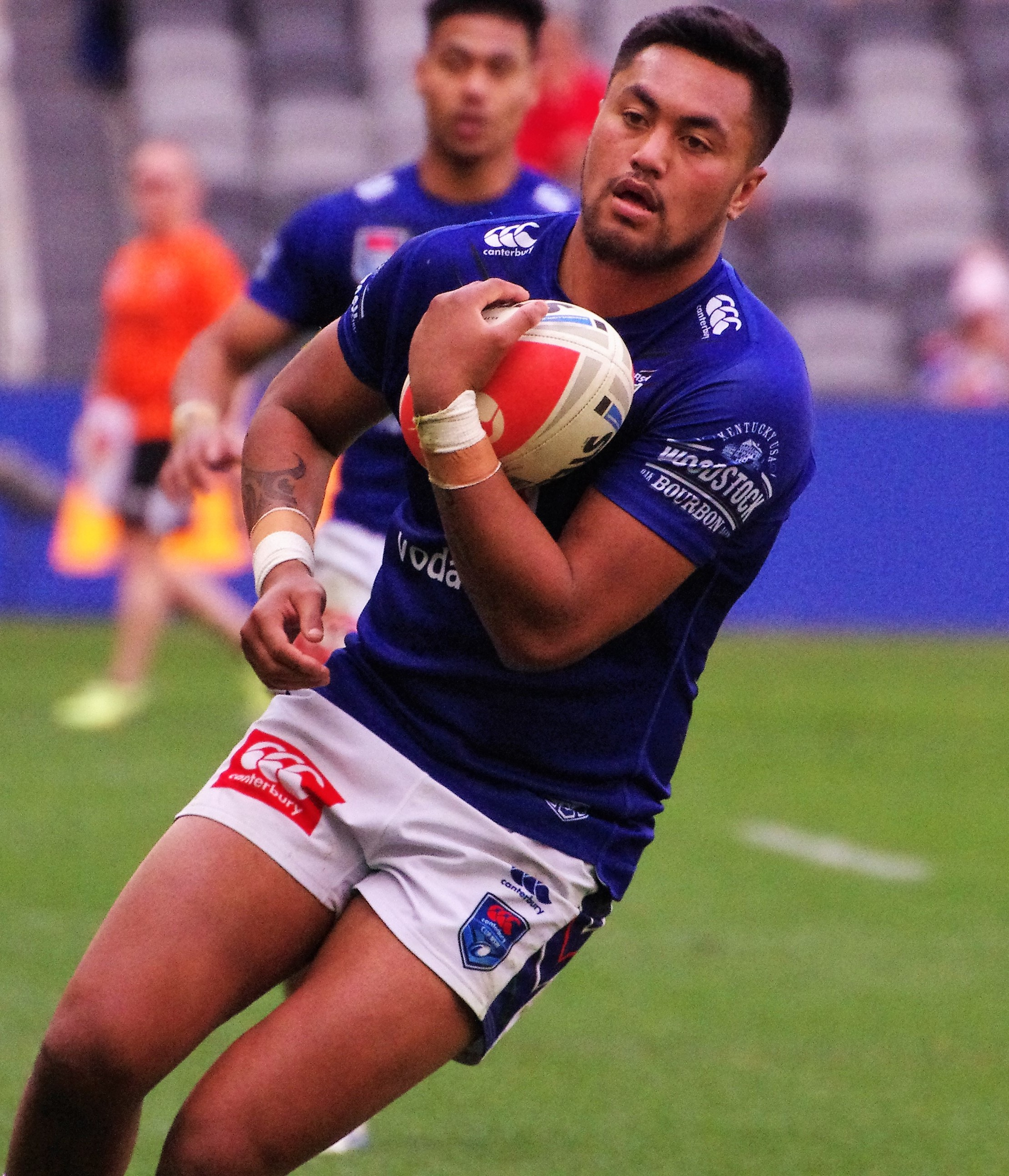

Personal information
- Full name: Adam Wetere Moses Pompey
- Born: 22 August 1998 (age 28) Auckland, New Zealand
- Height: 190 cm (6 ft 3 in)
- Weight: 101 kg (15 st 13 lb)

Playing information
- Position: Centre, Wing
Club
Years	Team	Pld	T	G	FG	P
2019–26	New Zealand Warriors	137	39	66	0	288
2027-	Melbourne Storm	0	0	0	0	0
	Total	137	39	66	0	288
Representative
Years	Team	Pld	T	G	FG	P
2023–26	Māori All Stars	3	0	0	0	0
- Source: As of 12 September 2026

Adam Pompey (born 22 August 1998) is a New Zealand professional rugby league footballer who plays as a centre or winger for the Melbourne Storm in the National Rugby League.

== Background ==
Pompey was born in Auckland, New Zealand. He attended Wesley College in Auckland.

He played in the NRL Under-20s for the Sydney Roosters and, while under contract there, played also for the Roosters' feeder club, the Wyong Roos.

== Career ==
=== 2019 ===
Pompey made his first grade debut for the Warriors against the Cronulla-Sutherland Sharks in round 18 of the 2019 NRL season. In round 24 2019, Pompey scored his first NRL try in the Warriors 10–31 loss to the South Sydney Rabbitohs at Mt Smart Stadium in Auckland.

=== 2020 ===
In round 16 of the 2020 NRL season, Pompey scored two tries in a 36–6 victory over Newcastle at Scully Park in Tamworth.

=== 2021 ===
In round 3 of the 2021 NRL season, Pompey scored the match winning try in a 34–31 win over the Canberra Raiders.

=== 2022 ===
Pompey made a total of 19 appearances for the New Zealand club in the 2022 NRL season as they finished 15th on the table.

=== 2023 ===
In round 6 of the 2023 NRL season, Pompey scored two tries for New Zealand in their 34–24 loss against Newcastle. Pompey played a total of 27 matches for New Zealand in the 2023 NRL season as the club finished fourth and qualified for the finals. In the 2023 preliminary final, Pompey missed all three conversion attempts at goal and was sin binned for a professional foul in the second half as New Zealand lost 42–12 against Brisbane.

=== 2024 ===
Pompey made 15 appearances for the New Zealand Warriors in the 2024 NRL season which saw the club finish 13th on the table.

=== 2025 ===
On 18 February, the New Zealand Warriors announced that Pompey had re-signed with the club until the end of the 2027 season. In round 8 of the 2025 NRL season, Pompey scored two tries for New Zealand in their 26–12 victory over Newcastle. Pompey played every game for New Zealand in the 2025 NRL season as the club finished 6th on the table and qualified for the finals. They were eliminated by Penrith in the first week of the finals.

=== 2026 ===
On 23 September, the Warriors announced that Pompey was released from his contract and would continue his playing career in Australia. On 29 September 2026, the Storm announced that they had signed Pompey on a two year deal.

== Statistics ==
Year	Team	Games	Tries	Goals	Pts
2019	New Zealand Warriors	5	2		8
2020	New Zealand Warriors	13	5	1	22
2021	New Zealand Warriors	16	4		16
2022	New Zealand Warriors	19	5		20
2023	New Zealand Warriors	27	5	20	60
2024	New Zealand Warriors	15	2	24	56
2025	New Zealand Warriors	21	11	6	56
2026	New Zealand Warriors	17	5	15	50
2027	Melbourne Storm				
	Totals	137	39	66	288
