= Edward Kosi =

New Zealand rugby league footballer

Ed Kosi
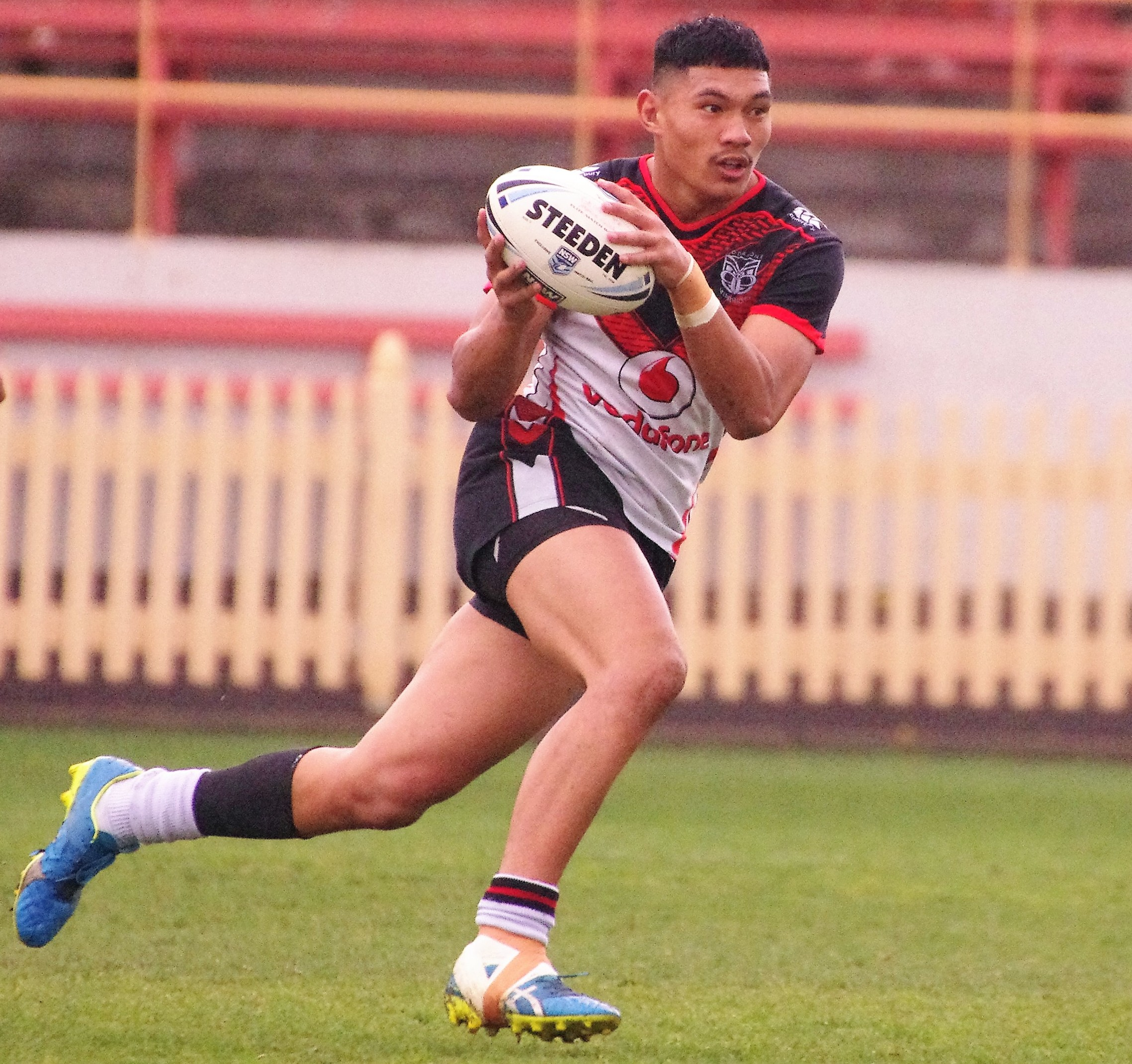

Personal information
- Full name: Edward Kosi
- Born: 28 January 1999 (age 27) Auckland, New Zealand
- Height: 193 cm (6 ft 4 in)
- Weight: 107 kg (16 st 12 lb)

Playing information
- Position: Wing
Club
Years	Team	Pld	T	G	FG	P
2021–25	New Zealand Warriors	36	19	0	0	76
2026–	South Sydney	6	3	0	0	12
	Total	42	22	0	0	88
- Source: As of 3 July 2026

Edward Kosi (born 28 January 1999) is a New Zealand professional rugby league footballer who plays as a winger for the South Sydney Rabbitohs in the National Rugby League (NRL). He attended De La Salle College, Māngere East and played all his junior footy for Mangere East Hawks

== Playing career ==
=== 2021 ===
Kosi made his first grade debut in round 8 of the 2021 NRL season, starting on the wing for the New Zealand Warriors against North Queensland.

=== 2022 ===
In round 7 of the 2022 NRL season against Melbourne, Kosi was responsible for multiple errors which lead to tries in New Zealand's record 70-10 loss at AAMI Park. The following day, Kosi was the only player demoted to reserve grade from the New Zealand Warriors side following the defeat. In round 22 of the 2022 NRL season, Kosi scored two tries for New Zealand in a 42-18 victory over Canterbury. Kosi played a total of eleven games for the New Zealand Warriors as they finished 15th on the table.

=== 2023 & 2024 ===
Kosi played 11 games for the New Zealand Warriors in the 2023 NRL season and scored five tries as the club finished 4th on the table and qualified for the finals. In the 2024 NRL season, Kosi was limited to only five appearances with the club scoring three tries.

=== 2025 ===
On 4 August, South Sydney announced that they had signed Kosi on a two-year deal. On 28 September, he played in New Zealand's 30-12 NSW Cup Grand Final victory over St. George Illawarra.

=== 2026 ===
Kosi was limited to just six matches for South Sydney in the 2026 NRL season as the club finished 6th on the table and qualified for the finals.

== Statistics ==
Year	Team	Games	Tries	Pts
2021	New Zealand Warriors	5	1	4
2022	New Zealand Warriors	11	8	32
2023	New Zealand Warriors	11	5	20
2024	New Zealand Warriors	5	3	12
2025	New Zealand Warriors	4	2	8
2026	South Sydney Rabbitohs	3		
	Totals	39	19	76
