= Ali Leiataua =

New Zealand rugby league player

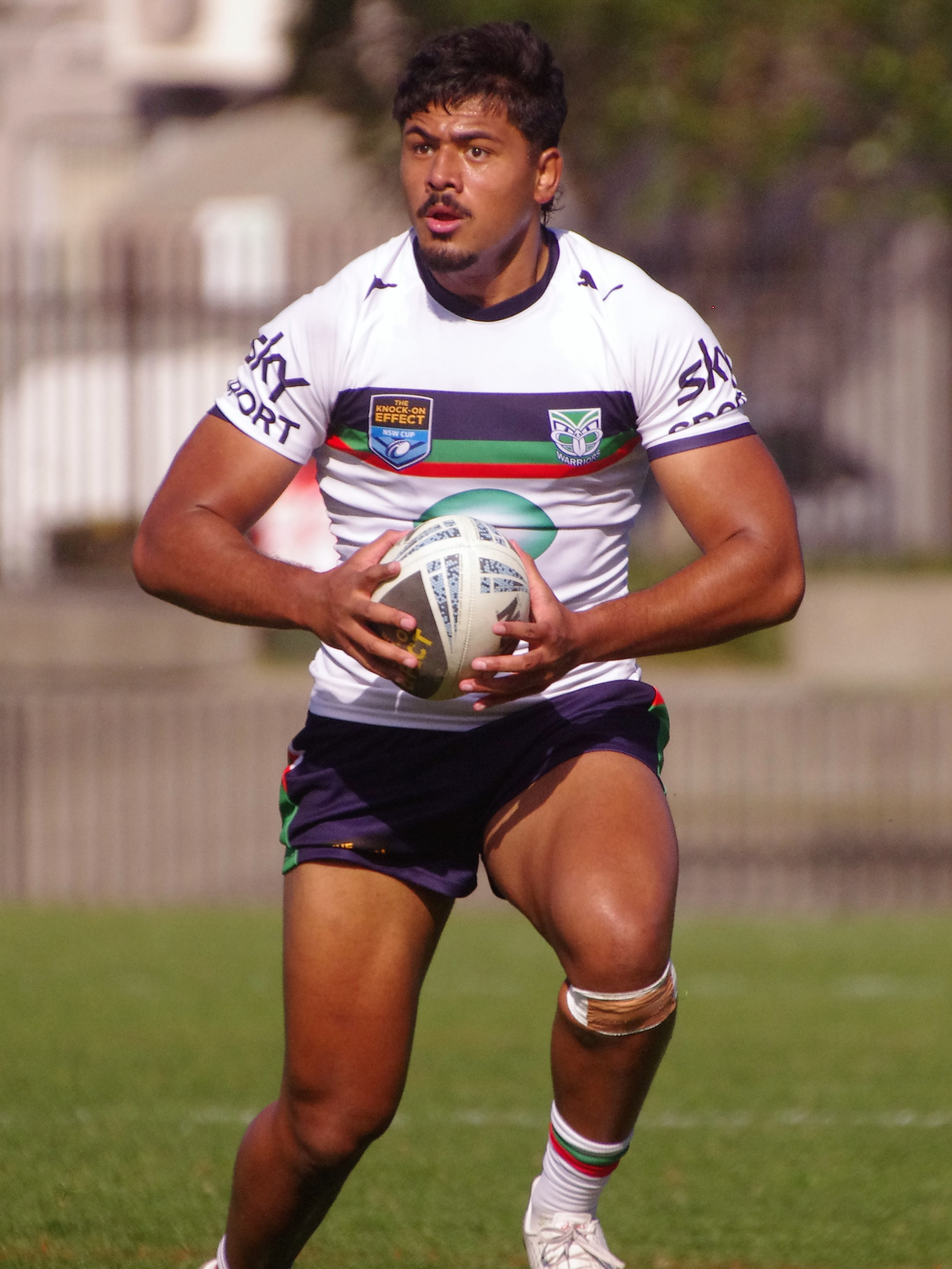

Personal information
- Born: 9 January 2003 (age 23) Auckland, New Zealand
- Height: 188 cm (6 ft 2 in)
- Weight: 102 kg (16 st 1 lb)

Playing information
- Position: Centre
Club
Years	Team	Pld	T	G	FG	P
2023–	New Zealand Warriors	37	12	0	0	48
- Source: As of 6 November 2026
- Education: King's College, Auckland
- Relatives: Ali Lauiti'iti (uncle)

Ali Leiataua (/leɪətaʊə/) (born 9 January 2003) is a New Zealand rugby league footballer who plays as a centre for the New Zealand Warriors in the National Rugby League (NRL).

== Background ==
Leiataua was born in Auckland, and was educated at King's College. He is the nephew of former New Zealand Warriors player, and his namesake, Ali Lauiti'iti.

== Playing career ==
=== Juniors ===
In 2017, Leiataua earned a contract with the New Zealand Warriors at age 14 whilst playing rugby union for King's College and rugby league for the Papatoetoe Panthers.

He went on to play for 'Auckland Blue' in the New Zealand Rugby League under-20s competition, as well as the Warriors' S.G. Ball Cup side.

=== 2023 ===
Following a string of good form, and injuries to other centres, Leiataua was named to debut at centre in his side's 36−14 victory over the Canberra Raiders at Canberra Stadium in round 15 of the 2023 NRL season. Leiataua re-signed with the club for a further two seasons.

=== 2024 ===
Leiataua scored his first NRL try in Round 11 of the 2024 NRL Season against the Penrith Panthers, his first appearance in the side since his debut.

Leiataua would go on to finish the season having played 6 games, and scored 3 tries.

Leiataua re-signed with the Warriors until the end of 2027.

=== 2025 ===
On 28 September, he played in New Zealand's 30-12 NSW Cup Grand Final victory over St. George Illawarra.

=== 2026 ===
He played 22 games for the New Zealand Warriors in the 2026 NRL season as the club finished second on the table but were eliminated from the finals in straight sets.
