= Balin Cupples =

Australian rugby player (born 1981)

Personal information
- Born: 21 July 1981 (age 44)

Playing information
- Position: Wing
Club
Years	Team	Pld	T	G	FG	P
2002–03	Wests Tigers	4	0	0	0	0
Representative
Years	Team	Pld	T	G	FG	P
2005	Queensland Residents	1	0	0	0	0
- As of 4 January 2024

Balin Cupples (born 21 July 1981) is a former professional rugby league footballer who played for the Wests Tigers.

== Playing career ==
=== Wests Tigers ===
Cupples made his National Rugby League debut for the Wests Tigers in round 9 of 2002, playing from the bench. In round 13, he made his first appearance in the starting team, playing on the wing. Making one appearance, his last, in 2003, Cupples had played four games in first-grade, all losses.

=== Burleigh Bears ===
Returning to the Queensland Cup, Cupples played with the Burleigh Bears, and was a member of the Queensland Residents team in 2005.

== Coaching career ==
Cupples became a coach after his playing retirement. In 2011 he was coach of the Wests Tigers SG Ball side, and in 2012 was the NYC team's strength and conditioning coach. In 2013, he was the assistant coach for the New South Wales Under-18 team that defeated Queensland 56–6.

== Footnotes ==
- Alan Whiticker & Glen Hudson (2007). The Encyclopedia of Rugby League Players. Wetherill Park, New South Wales: Gary Allen Pty Ltd. p. 114. ISBN 978-1-877082-93-1.
