= Zyon Maiu'u =

New Zealand rugby league footballer (born 2003)

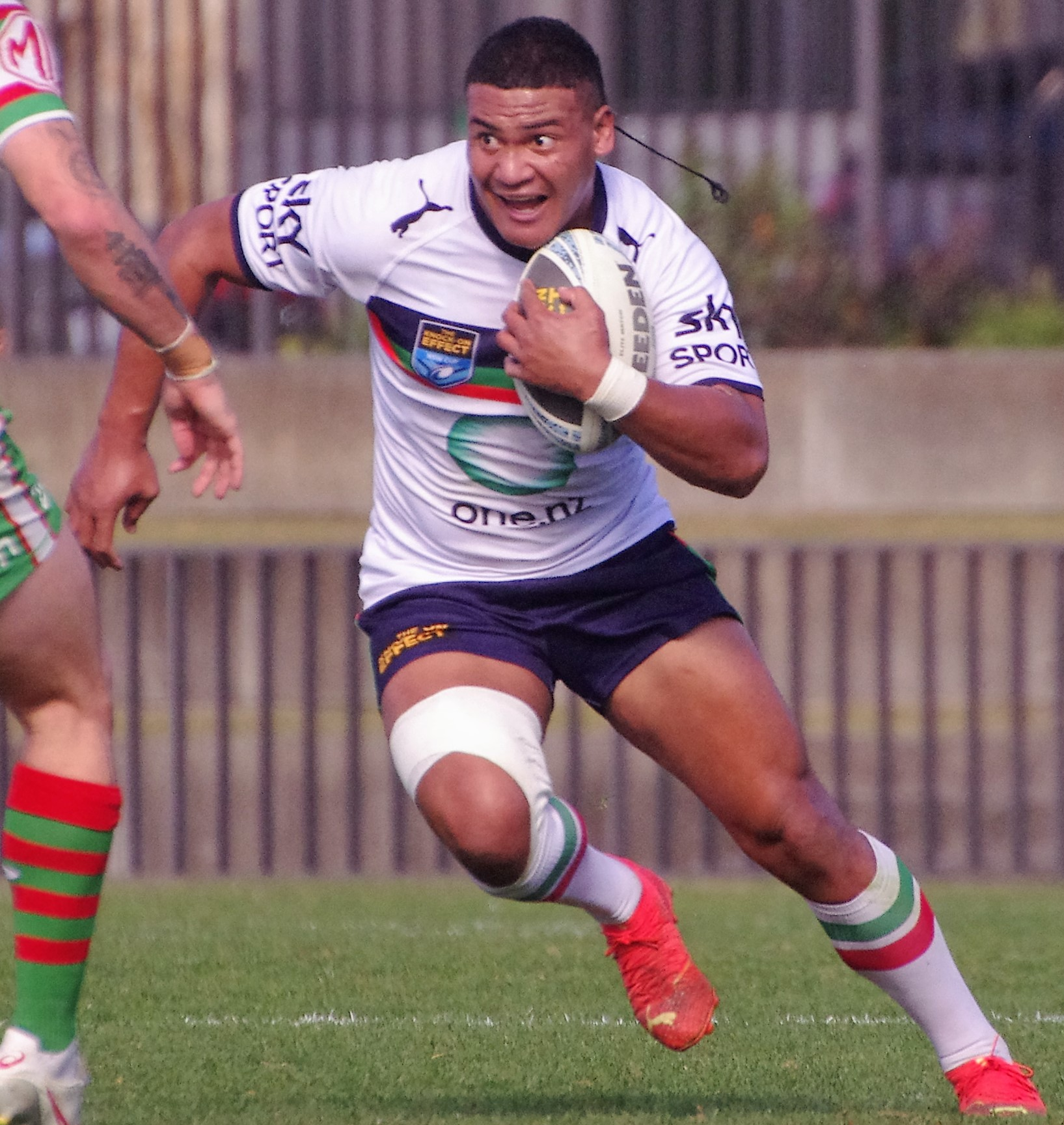

Personal information
- Full name: Zyon Maiu'u
- Born: 29 June 2003 (age 22) Auckland, New Zealand
- Height: 183 cm (6 ft 0 in)
- Weight: 106 kg (16 st 10 lb)

Playing information
- Position: Prop
Club
| Years | Team | Pld | T | G | FG | P |
|---|---|---|---|---|---|---|
| 2024 | New Zealand Warriors | 1 | 0 | 0 | 0 | 0 |
| 2025– | Canterbury Bulldogs | 0 | 0 | 0 | 0 | 0 |
| | Total | 1 | 0 | 0 | 0 | 0 |

Zyon Maiu'u (/zaɪən maɪuː/) (born 29 June 2003) is a New Zealand rugby league footballer who plays as a prop forward for the Canterbury-Bankstown Bulldogs in the NRL.

Maiu'u made his first grade debut from the bench for the Warriors in their 27−24 loss to the Gold Coast Titans in round 8 of the 2024 NRL season.

On 3 February 2025, the New Zealand Warriors announced that Maiu'u was released from his contract to pursue an opportunity in Australia. On 4 February 2025, the Canterbury-Bankstown Bulldogs announced that they had signed Maiu'u on a two-year deal.
