= Moala Graham-Taufa =

New Zealand rugby league player

Moala Graham Taufa
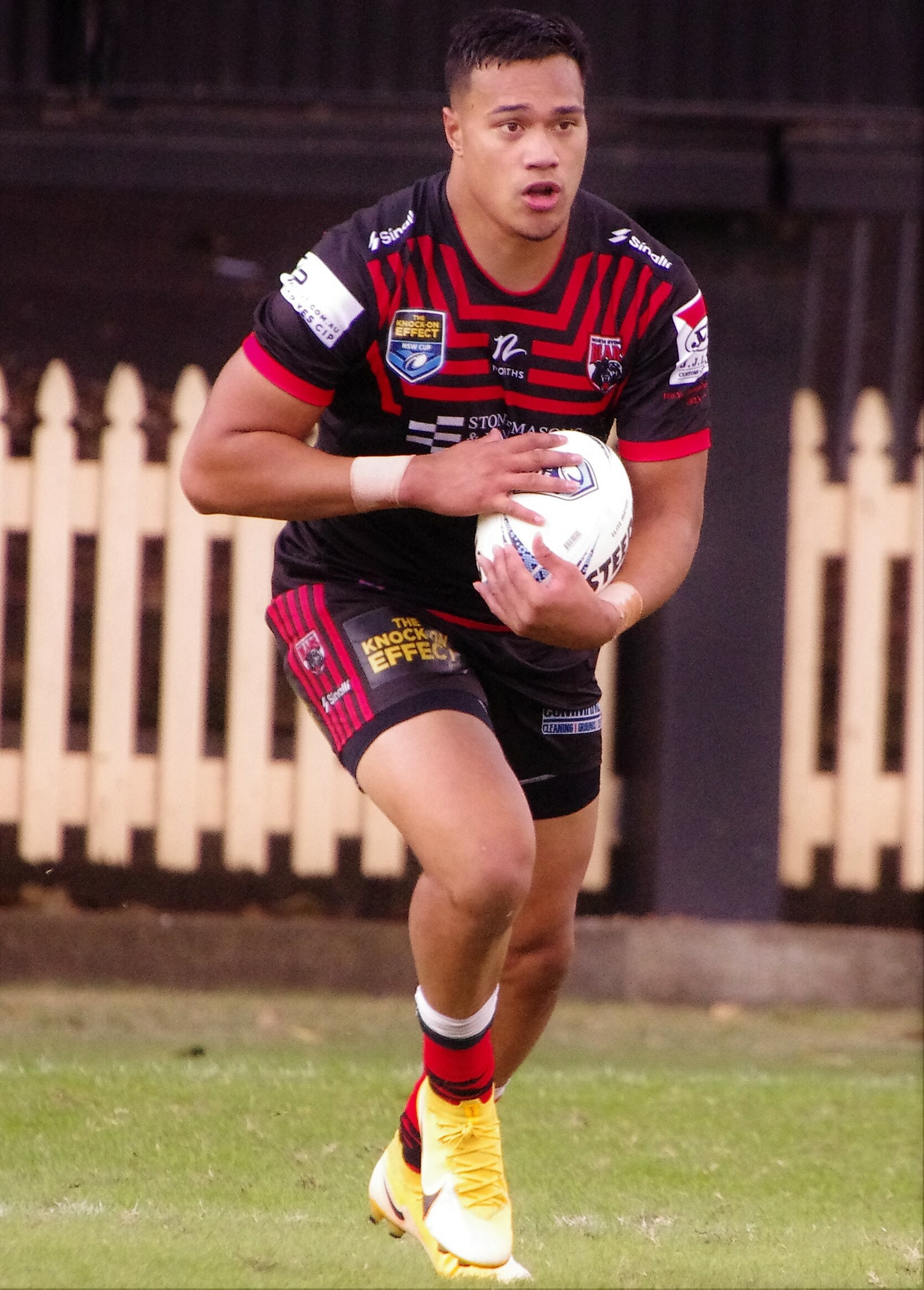

Personal information
- Full name: Moala Graham-Taufa
- Born: 22 February 2002 (age 24) Auckland, New Zealand
- Height: 182 cm (6 ft 0 in)
- Weight: 96 kg (15 st 2 lb)

Playing information
- Position: Centre
Club
Years	Team	Pld	T	G	FG	P
2021	Sydney Roosters	1	0	0	0	0
2024–25	New Zealand Warriors	4	1	0	0	4
2026	South Sydney Rabbitohs	4	0	0	0	0
2027–	Hull KR	0	0	0	0	0
	Total	9	1	0	0	4
- Source: As of 20 November 2026

Moala Graham-Taufa (born 22 February 2002) is a professional rugby league footballer who plays as a centre for Hull KR in the Super League. He previously played for the Sydney Roosters, the New Zealand Warriors and South Sydney Rabbitohs in the National Rugby League.

== Background ==
Graham-Taufa is a product of the Marist Saints junior club in Auckland. He did his schooling at Balmoral Intermediate and Mt Albert Grammar School before moving to Australia in his teens.

Graham-Taufa then joined the Sydney Roosters junior representative systems, playing for their Harold Matthews and SG Ball teams, debuting for the Roosters NSW Cup feeder side, the North Sydney Bears. In five games Graham-Taufa scored four tries in NSW Cup before the competition was cancelled due to COVID lockdown in Sydney.

In round 24 of the 2021 NRL season, Graham-Taufa made his first grade debut for the Sydney Roosters against the South Sydney Rabbitohs at Suncorp Stadium in a 54–12 loss. Graham-Taufa came on as an 18th man inclusion after Joey Manu was taken off due to a Latrell Mitchell hit. During the 2022 season, Graham-Taufa was released by the Sydney Roosters, subsequently signing with the Parramatta Eels. Graham-Taufa signed with the New Zealand Warriors on a train and trial deal for the 2023 NRL season. Graham-Taufa played 23 games for the New Zealand Warriors NSW Cup team in 2023.

=== 2025 ===
On 21 May, Graham-Taufa signed a one-year deal with the South Sydney Rabbitohs for the 2026 NRL season.

=== 2026 ===
On 29 September, it was announced that Graham-Taufa had signed a two-year deal with Super League club Hull KR for the 2027 Super League season onwards.
