= Tanah Boyd =

Australian rugby league footballer

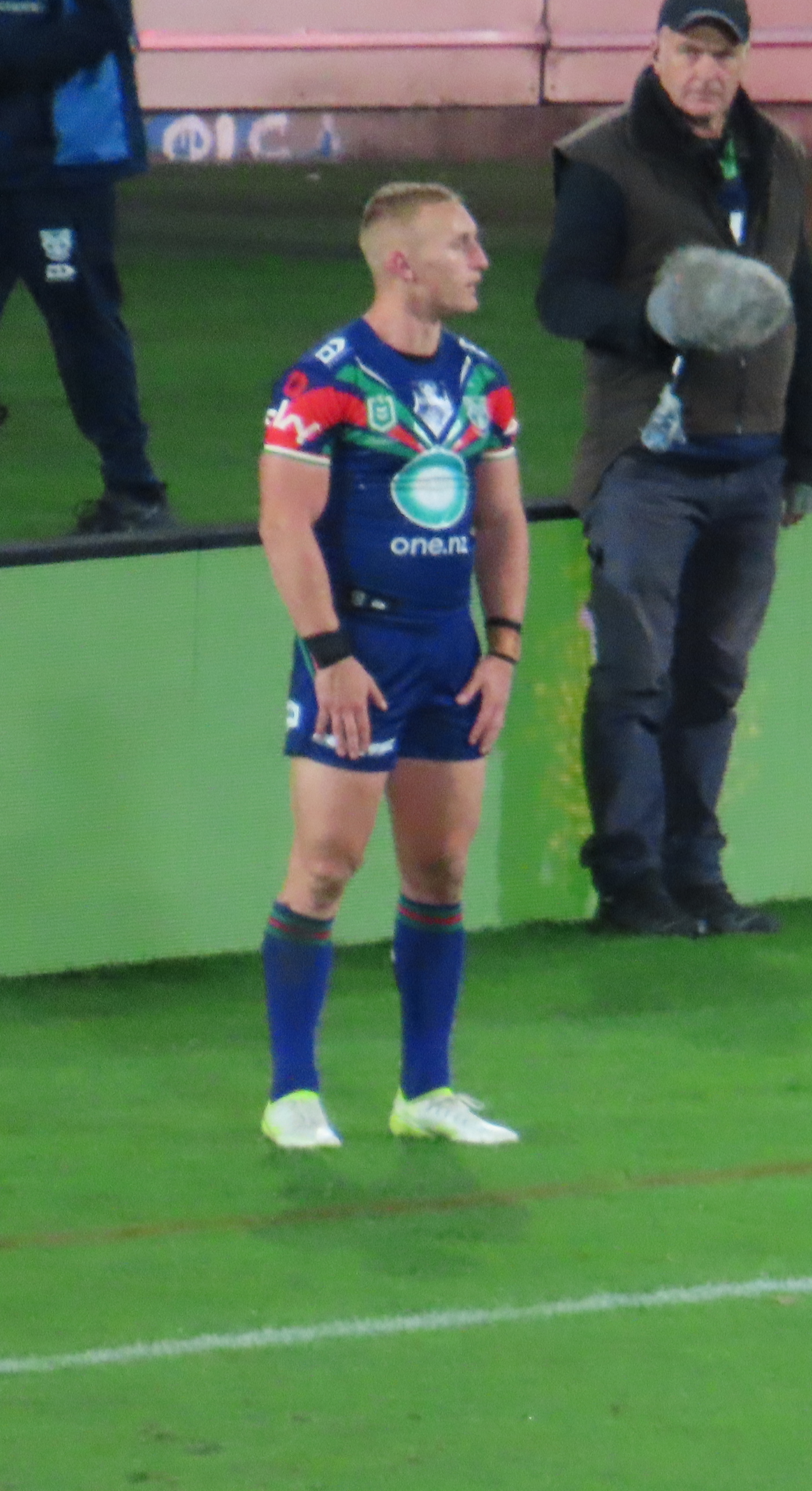
- Boyd playing for the New Zealand Warriors in 2026.

Personal information
- Born: 28 July 2000 (age 26) Penrith, New South Wales, Australia
- Height: 176 cm (5 ft 9 in)
- Weight: 86 kg (13 st 8 lb)

Playing information
- Position: Halfback, Five-eighth
Club
Years	Team	Pld	T	G	FG	P
2019–24	Gold Coast Titans	69	9	108	3	255
2025–	New Zealand Warriors	19	3	69	0	150
	Total	88	12	177	3	405
- Source: As of 17 May 2026

Tanah Boyd (born 28 July 2000) is an Australian professional rugby league player who plays as a halfback or five-eighth for the New Zealand Warriors in the National Rugby League.

== Background ==
Boyd was born in Penrith, New South Wales, Australia.

A Runaway Bay Seagulls junior, Boyd attended Keebra Park State High School, before being signed by the Brisbane Broncos. In 2017, Boyd was a member of Keebra Park's ARL Schoolboy Cup winning side and was selected for the Australian Schoolboys on their tour of New Zealand. Boyd's father, Shayne, is a former first grade player, playing for the Penrith Panthers and Balmain Tigers.

Tanah's partner is Jacqui Yorston, who played for Port Adelaide in AFL Women's.

== Playing career ==
=== Early career ===
In 2016, Boyd played for Gold Coast White in the Cyril Connell Cup and was selected in the Queensland under-16 side. In 2017, he joined the Souths Logan Magpies, playing for their Mal Meninga Cup side, and was selected in the Queensland under-18 side. In 2018, he began the season playing for the Magpies' Mal Meninga Cup side, who won the Grand Final but lost to the Penrith Panthers in the under-18 National Title game. Later that season, he made his Hastings Deering Colts and Queensland Cup debut for Souths Logan, and was again selected in the Queensland under-18 side.

=== 2019 ===
In 2019, Boyd moved up to the Brisbane Broncos NRL squad on a development contract.

On 12 June, he made a mid-season move to the Gold Coast Titans, signing with the club until the end of the 2021 NRL season. He began playing for their Queensland Cup feeder side, the Burleigh Bears. On 30 June, he was selected in the Queensland under-20 team, coming off the bench in their loss to New South Wales.

In Round 24 of the 2019 NRL season, Boyd made his NRL debut for the Gold Coast against the Newcastle Knights.

=== 2020 ===
Boyd played 13 games for the Gold Coast in the 2020 NRL season as the club finished ninth on the table and missed the finals.

=== 2021 ===
Boyd was limited to only six matches in the 2021 NRL season. Boyd did not play in the Gold Coast's elimination finals loss to the Sydney Roosters.

=== 2022 ===
In round 25 of the 2022 NRL season, Boyd kicked a field goal in golden point extra-time to win the game for the Gold Coast 27–26 against the New Zealand Warriors. Boyd played a total of 18 matches for the Gold Coast throughout the season scoring three tries. The club would endure a difficult season finishing 13th on the table.

=== 2023 ===
In round 3 of the 2023 NRL season, Boyd scored two tries and kicked five goals in the Gold Coast's 38–34 upset victory over Melbourne. Boyd played a total of 21 games for the Gold Coast in the 2023 NRL season as the club finished 14th on the table.

=== 2024 ===
Boyd played nine games for the Gold Coast in the 2024 NRL season as the club finished 14th on the table. On 31 October 2024, Boyd signed a two-year deal with the New Zealand Warriors.

=== 2025 ===
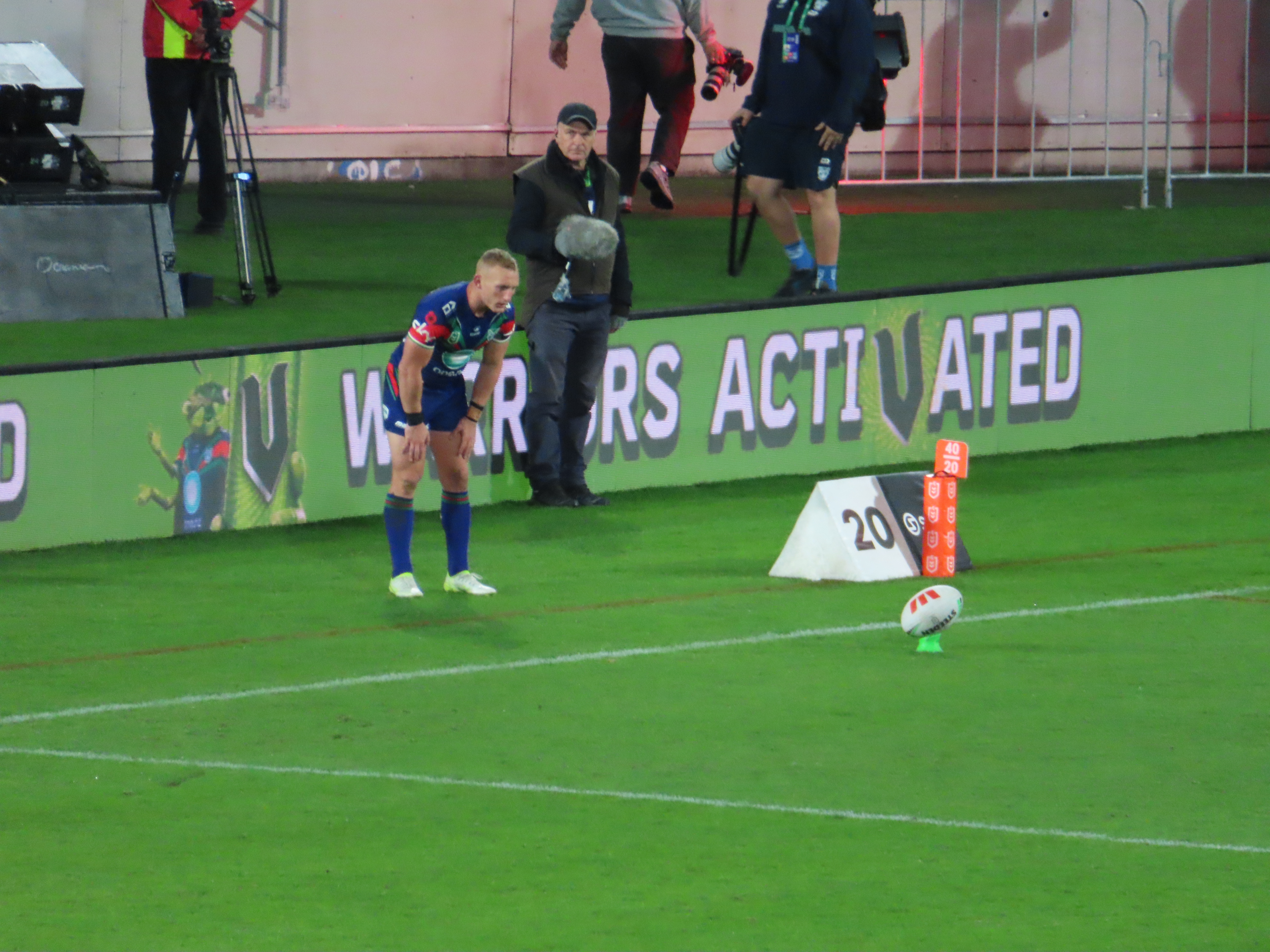
Boyd preparing for a goal kick for the Warriors in 2026.

In round 19 of the 2025 NRL season, Boyd made his club debut for the New Zealand side in their victory over the Wests Tigers. On 28 September, Boyd played in the New Zealand Warriors NSW Cup grand final victory against the St. George Illawarra.

=== 2026 ===
On 11 May, it was reported that Boyd had re-signed with the Warriors until the end of 2029. On 19 May, the Warriors announced that Boyd would miss the rest of the season after suffering an ACL injury in the Warriors' win against the Broncos in Magic Round. On 22 May, the New Zealand Warriors officially announced that Boyd had re-signed with the club until the end of 2029. Boyd was limited to just ten appearances with the club in 2026 as they finished second on the table.

== Statistics ==
Year	Team	Games	Tries	Goals	FGs	Pts
2019	Gold Coast Titans	2				
2020	Gold Coast Titans	13	1			4
2021	Gold Coast Titans	6	1			4
2022	Gold Coast Titans	18	3	23	1	59
2023	Gold Coast Titans	21	2	66	1	141
2024	Gold Coast Titans	9	2	16	1	41
2025	New Zealand Warriors	9		29		58
2026	New Zealand Warriors	10	3	40		92
	Totals	88	12	177	3	405

*denotes season competing
