= 2023 New Zealand Warriors season =

NRL rugby league season

- NRL Rank: See ladder on this page
- 2023 record: Wins: 16; draws: 0; losses: 8
- Points scored: For: 485; against: 364 (Round 19)

Team information
- CEO: Cameron George
- Head Coach: Andrew Webster
- Captain: Tohu Harris
- Stadium: Mount Smart Stadium – 25,000
- Avg. attendance: 22,685
- High attendance: 25,095 (Go Media Stadium)
- Low attendance: 15,600 (McLean Park)

Top scorers
- Tries: Dallin Watene-Zelezniak (21)
- Goals: Shaun Johnson (71)
- Points: Shaun Johnson (176)
← 2022	List of seasons	2024 →

The 2023 New Zealand Warriors season was the 29th in the club's history. They competed in the National Rugby League's 2023 Telstra Premiership. The Captain Tohu Harris retained his club role for the 3rd consecutive season and Head Coach Andrew Webster joined to coach the club for the 2023 NRL Season.

The Warriors made the finals series for the ninth time in their history and made it to the preliminary final before losing to the Brisbane Broncos.

== Player movement ==
These movements happened across the previous season, off-season and pre-season.

=== Gains ===
Player/Coach	Previous club	Length	Ref.
Marata Niukore	Parramatta Eels	2026	
Luke Metcalf	Cronulla-Sutherland Sharks	2024	
Dylan Walker	Manly Warringah Sea Eagles	2025	
Mitchell Barnett	Newcastle Knights	2025	
Charnze Nicoll-Klokstad	Canberra Raiders	2025	
Te Maire Martin	Brisbane Broncos	2025	
Jackson Ford	St. George Illawarra Dragons	2024	
Brayden Wiliame	USA Perpignan	2024	

=== Losses ===
Player/Coach	New Club	Ref.
Euan Aitken	Dolphins	
Reece Walsh	Brisbane Broncos	
Eliesa Katoa	Melbourne Storm	
Aaron Pene	Melbourne Storm	
Jack Murchie	Parramatta Eels	
Ben Murdoch-Masila	St. George Illawarra Dragons	
Taniela Otukolo	Redcliffe Dolphins	
Otukinekina Kepu	Redcliffe Dolphins	

== Pre-Season Challenge ==
The Warriors played two pre-season matches.

Date	Round	Opponent	Venue	Score	Tries	Goals	Attendance
Thursday, 9 February	Trial 1	Wests Tigers	Mount Smart Stadium	48 – 12	Marcelo Montoya (3); Viliami Vailea (2); Jackson Ford; Luke Metcalf; Moala Graham-Taufa; Solomon Vasuvulagi	Luke Metcalf (3/5); Viliami Vailea (1/1); Edien Ackland (2/3)	4,000
Sunday, 19 February	Trial 2	Melbourne Storm	Orangetheory Stadium	6 – 24	Dallin Watene-Zelezniak	Shaun Johnson (1/1)	11,817

== Regular season ==
=== League table ===
2023 NRL season
Pos	Team	Pld	W	D	L	B	PF	PA	PD	Pts
1	Penrith Panthers (P)	24	18	0	6	3	645	312	+333	42
2	Brisbane Broncos	24	18	0	6	3	639	425	+214	42
3	Melbourne Storm	24	16	0	8	3	627	459	+168	38
4	New Zealand Warriors	24	16	0	8	3	572	448	+124	38
5	Newcastle Knights	24	14	1	9	3	626	451	+175	35
6	Cronulla-Sutherland Sharks	24	14	0	10	3	619	497	+122	34
7	Sydney Roosters	24	13	0	11	3	472	496	−24	32
8	Canberra Raiders	24	13	0	11	3	486	623	−137	32
9	South Sydney Rabbitohs	24	12	0	12	3	564	505	+59	30
10	Parramatta Eels	24	12	0	12	3	587	574	+13	30
11	North Queensland Cowboys	24	12	0	12	3	546	542	+4	30
12	Manly Warringah Sea Eagles	24	11	1	12	3	545	539	+6	29
13	Dolphins	24	9	0	15	3	520	631	−111	24
14	Gold Coast Titans	24	9	0	15	3	527	653	−126	24
15	Canterbury-Bankstown Bulldogs	24	7	0	17	3	438	769	−331	20
16	St. George Illawarra Dragons	24	5	0	19	3	474	673	−199	16
17	Wests Tigers	24	4	0	20	3	385	675	−290	14

=== Matches ===
Date	Round	Opponent	Venue	Score	Tries	Goals	Attendance
Friday, 3 March	1	Newcastle Knights	Sky Stadium	20 – 12	Edward Kosi 25'; Bunty Afoa 29'; Charnze Nicoll-Klokstad 51'; Wayde Egan 73'	Shaun Johnson (2/4)	16,676
Saturday, 11 March	2	Sydney Roosters	Allianz Stadium	20 - 12	Wayde Egan 24'; Addin Fonua-Blake 62'	Shaun Johnson (2/2)	16,267
Saturday, 18 March	3	North Queensland Cowboys	Queensland Country Bank Stadium	12 – 26	Wayde Egan 8'; Marcelo Montoya 28', 55'; Jazz Tevaga 33'; Edward Kosi 47'	Shaun Johnson (3/5)	17,818
Sunday, 26 March	4	Canterbury-Bankstown Bulldogs	Mount Smart Stadium	16 – 14	Viliami Vailea 37'; Marcelo Montoya 55'; Shaun Johnson 66'	Shaun Johnson (2/3)	18,895
Sunday, 2 April	5	Cronulla-Sutherland Sharks	PointsBet Stadium	30 – 32	Wayde Egan 21'; Marata Niukore; Shaun Johnson 45'; Edward Kosi 51'; Josh Curran 67'	Shaun Johnson (6/6)	10,878
Sunday, 9 April	6	Newcastle Knights	McDonald Jones Stadium	34 – 24	Adam Pompey 22', 49'; Edward Kosi 55'; Jackson Ford 71'	Shaun Johnson (4/4)	18,007
Saturday, 15 April	7	North Queensland Cowboys	Mount Smart Stadium	22 – 14	Addin Fonua-Blake 3'; Edward Kosi 28'; Josh Curran 50'; Dylan Walker 61'	Shaun Johnson (3/6)	23,695
Tuesday, 25 April	8	Melbourne Storm	AAMI Park	30 – 22	Jackson Ford 4'; Dallin Watene-Zelezniak '10, '44; Addin Fonua-Blake '20	Shaun Johnson (3/4)	23,469
Sunday, 30 April	9	Sydney Roosters	Mount Smart Stadium	14 – 0	-	-	20,395
Saturday, 6 May	10	Penrith Panthers	Suncorp Stadium	18 – 6	Addin Fonua-Blake 9'	Shaun Johnson (1/1)	38,035
Friday, 12 May	11	Canterbury-Bankstown Bulldogs	Accor Stadium	24 – 12	Josh Curran 6'; Addin Fonua-Blake 24'; Dallin Watene-Zelezniak 34'; Ronald Volkman 66'	Shaun Johnson (4/4)	14,294
	12	BYE					
Saturday, 27 May	13	Brisbane Broncos	McLean Park	22 – 26	Dallin Watene-Zelezniak 36', 61'; Charnze Nicoll-Klokstad 74'; Marcelo Montoya 77'	Shaun Johnson (3/4)	15,600
Saturday, 3 June	14	Dolphins	Go Media Stadium	30 – 8	Shaun Johnson 5', 53'; Luke Metcalf 55', Dallin Watene-Zelezniak 68', 71'	Shaun Johnson (5/5)	23,686
Saturday, 10 June	15	Canberra Raiders	GIO Stadium	36 – 14	Dallin Watene-Zelezniak 31'; Charnze Nicoll-Klokstad 47'; Tom Ale 54'; Luke Metcalf 62'; Wayde Egan 66'; Shaun Johnson 78'	Shaun Johnson (4/4); Adam Pompey (2/2)	21,082
	16	BYE					
Friday, 23 June	17	St. George Illawarra Dragons	WIN Stadium	48 – 18	Dallin Watene-Zelezniak 4', 48', 69', 71'; Marcelo Montoya 25'; Bayley Sironen 29'; Jackson Ford 32'; Shaun Johnson 53'; Rocco Berry 56'	Shaun Johnson (6/9)	9,275
Friday, 30 June	18	South Sydney Rabbitohs	Go Media Stadium	28 – 6	Marcelo Montoya 15'	Shaun Johnson (1/1)	22,612
Saturday, 8 July	18	Parramatta Eels	CommBank Stadium	46 – 10	Luke Metcalf 6', 33'; Marcelo Montoya 26', 30'; Dylan Walker 39'; Mitchell Barnett 48', 70'; Dallin Watene-Zelezniak 58'	Shaun Johnson (7/8)	21,696
Sunday, 16 July	20	Cronulla-Sutherland Sharks	Go Media Stadium	44 – 12	Dallin Watene-Zelezniak 19', 63'; Rocco Berry 25'; Addin Fonua-Blake 28'; Luke Metcalf 31'; Charnze Nicoll-Klokstad 55'; Josh Curran 59'; Adam Pompey 77'	Shaun Johnson (6/8), Luke Metcalf (1/1)	24,012
Friday, 21 July	21	Canberra Raiders	Go Media Stadium	21 – 20	Marata Niukore 3'; Charnze Nicoll-Klokstad 38'; Dallin Watene-Zelezniak 48'	Shaun Johnson (4/5), FG (1/1)	19,112
	22	BYE					
Friday, 4 August	23	Gold Coast Titans	Cbus Super Stadium	28 – 18	Shaun Johnson 26', 34'; Jackson Ford 42'; Tohu Harris 72'; Dallin Watene-Zelezniak 75'	Shaun Johnson (4/5)	20,877
Saturday, 12 August	24	Wests Tigers	FMG Stadium Waikato	30 - 22	Luke Metcalf 6'; Adam Pompey 13'; Dallin Watene-Zelezniak 32'; Tohu Harris 49'; Addin Fonua-Blake 76'	Adam Pompey (3/4); Shaun Johnson (2/2)	25,118
Friday, 18 August	25	Manly Warringah Sea Eagles	Daniel Anderson Stadium	29 - 22	Tohu Harris 7'; Dallin Watene-Zelezniak 11', 16', 50'; Marata Niukore 72'	Adam Pompey (4/5); Shaun Johnson FG (1/1)	24,112
Friday, 25 August	26	St. George Illawarra Dragons	Go Media Stadium	18 - 6	Adam Pompey 13'; Charnze Nicoll-Klokstad 19'; Addin Fonua-Blake 74'	Adam Pompey (3/4)	25,095
Saturday, 2 September	27	Dolphins	Suncorp Stadium	34-10	Freddy Lussick 57'; Marcelo Montoya 59'	Adam Pompey (1/2)	35,438

Round 1: 3 March 2023	New Zealand Warriors	20–12	Newcastle Knights	Wellington
20:00 NZDT	Tries: Kosi 25'; Afoa 29'; Nicoll-Klokstad 51'; Egan 73'; Goals: Johnson 2/4 30', 74'	[Report Report]	Tries: Fitzgibbon 1'; Hunt 45'; Goals: Hastings 2/2 3', 46'; Sin bin: Crossland (yellow card) 57' to 67'	Stadium: Sky Stadium; Attendance: 16,676; Referee: Chris Sutton

Round 2: 11 March 2023	Sydney Roosters	20–12	New Zealand Warriors	Moore Park
15:00 AEDT	Tries: Paulo 4', 47'; Walker 57'; Goals: Walker 4/6 6', 11 pen', 49', 74 pen'	[Report Report]	Tries: Egan 24'; Fonua-Blake 62'; Goals: Johnson 2/2 26', 63'	Stadium: Allianz Stadium; Attendance: 16,267; Referee: Adam Gee

Round 4: 26 March 2023	New Zealand Warriors	16–14	Canterbury-Bankstown Bulldogs	Auckland
16:00 NZDT	Tries: Vailea 27'; Montoya 55'; Johnson 66'; Goals: Johnson 2/3 28', 67'	[Report Report]	Tries: Kiraz 2'; Addo-Carr 44'; Goals: Burton 3/3 3', 8 pen', 45'	Stadium: Mount Smart Stadium; Attendance: 18,595; Referee: Peter Gough

== Finals ==
Qualifying and elimination finals
9 Sept – BlueBet Stadium
1	Penrith	32
4	New Zealand	6
10 Sept – McDonald Jones Stadium
5	Newcastle	30
8	Canberra	28
9 Sept – PointsBet Stadium
6	Cronulla-Sutherland	12
7	Sydney	13
8 Sept – Suncorp Stadium
2	Brisbane	26
3	Melbourne	0

Semi-finals
16 Sept – Go Media Stadium Mt. Smart
New Zealand	40
Newcastle	10
15 Sept – AAMI Park
Melbourne	18
Sydney	13

Preliminary finals
22 Sept – Accor Stadium
Penrith	38
Melbourne	4
23 Sept – Suncorp Stadium
Brisbane	42
New Zealand	12

Grand final
1 Oct – Accor Stadium
Penrith	26
Brisbane	24

=== Matches ===
Date	Round	Opponent	Venue	Score	Tries	Goals	Attendance
Saturday, 9 September	Qualifying Final	Penrith Panthers	BlueBet Stadium	32-6	Wayde Egan 56'	Adam Pompey (1/1)	21,525
Saturday, 16 September	Semi Final	Newcastle Knights	Go Media Stadium	40-10	Charnze Nicoll-Klokstad 1'; Addin Fonua-Blake 6'; Marcelo Montoya 11'; Dylan Walker 46'; Rocco Berry 59'; Dallin Watene-Zelezniak 63'; Bailey Sironen 75'	Adam Pompey (6/7); Dylan Walker (0/1) FG	26,083
Saturday, 23 September	Preliminary Final	Brisbane Broncos	Suncorp Stadium				52,273

== Squad ==
New Zealand Warriors 2023 squad
Top 30 squad - 2023 NRL season			Development list	Coaching staff
Bunty Afoa – PR; Tom Ale – PR; Mitchell Barnett – PR, SR; Rocco Berry – CE; Josh Curran – SR; Wayde Egan (vc) – HK; Addin Fonua-Blake – PR; Jackson Ford – SR; Tohu Harris (c) – LK; Shaun Johnson – HB	Valingi Kepu – PR; Edward Kosi – WG; Freddy Lussick – HK; Te Maire Martin – FE, HB; Luke Metcalf – FE; Marcelo Montoya – WG, CE; Charnze Nicoll-Klokstad – FB; Marata Niukore – SR; Adam Pompey – CE; Demitric Sifakula – LK, SR	Bayley Sironen – SR, LK; Jazz Tevaga – LK, PR; Taine Tuaupiki – FB; Viliami Vailea – CE; Ronald Volkman – FE, HB; Dylan Walker – LK, FE; Dallin Watene-Zelezniak – WG, FB; Brayden Wiliame – CE	Jacob Laban – SR; Ali Leiataua – CE; Zyon Maiu'u – PR; Extended squad: Ben Farr – FE, FB; Kalani Going – SR, LK, HK; Paul Roache – HK	Head coach: Andrew Webster; Assistant coaches: Richard Agar (Backs); Justin Morgan (Forwards); Stacey Jones (Halves & Special Plays); Slade Griffin (NRL Transition & NSW Cup); Balin Cupples (High Performance); Kai Kara-France (Wrestling); Daryl Halligan (Goalkicking); Legend: (c) Captain(s); (vc) Vice-captain(s); Updated: 19 June 2023; Source(s): Warriors Football Department

=== Debutants ===
Player	Round	Opponent	Cap Number	Notes
Mitchell Barnett	Round 1	Newcastle Knights	#273	Club Debut
Jackson Ford	Round 1	Newcastle Knights	#274	Club Debut
Te Maire Martin	Round 1	Newcastle Knights	#275	Club Debut
Marata Niukore	Round 1	Newcastle Knights	#276	Club Debut
Dylan Walker	Round 1	Newcastle Knights	#277	Club Debut
Brayden Wiliame	Round 1	Newcastle Knights	#278	Club Debut
Taine Tuaupiki	Round 3	North Queensland Cowboys	#279	NRL Debut
Demitric Sifakula	Round 9	Sydney Roosters	#280	NRL Debut
Luke Metcalf	Round 13	Brisbane Broncos	#281	Club Debut
Ali Leiataua	Round 15	Canberra Raiders	#282	NRL Debut

=== Milestones ===
Player	Round	Opponent	Milestone
Shaun Johnson	Round 26	St. George Illawarra Dragons	250th NRL Game
Tohu Harris	Round 26	St. George Illawarra Dragons	100th Club Game
Jackson Ford	Round 21	Canberra Raiders	50th NRL Game
Shaun Johnson	Round 19	Parramatta Eels	200th Club Game
Dylan Walker	Round 19	Parramatta Eels	200th NRL Game
Addin Fonua-Blake	Round 19	Parramatta Eels	150th NRL Game
Wayde Egan	Round 19	Parramatta Eels	100th NRL Game
Joshua Curran	Round 17	St. George Illawarra Dragons	50th Club Game
Joshua Curran	Round 15	Canberra Raiders	50th NRL Game
Marcelo Montoya	Round 10	Penrith Panthers	100th NRL Game
Shaun Johnson	Round 6	Newcastle Knights	1000 Club Points
Marata Niukore	Round 4	Canterbury-Bankstown Bulldogs	100th NRL Game
Tohu Harris	Round 3	North Queensland Cowboys	200th NRL Game

=== Club Awards ===
Player	Award
Shaun Johnson	Simon Mannering Medal (Player of the year), Players' Player, Peoples Choice
Charnze Nicoll-Klokstad	Clubman of the year
Taine Tuaupiki	Rookie of the year
Kalani Going	NSW Cup Player of the year
Ronald Volkman	NSW Cup Players' Player
Ali Leiataua	NSW Cup Man of the year
Demitric Sifakula	NSW Cup Man of the year

=== Dally M Awards ===
Player	Award
Shaun Johnson	Dally M Halfback of the year, RLPA Dream team Halfback, RLPA Players' Champion (Player of the year)
Andrew Webster	Dally M Coach of the year
Addin Fonua-Blake	Dally M Prop of the year, VB Hard Earned Player of the year, RLPA Dream team Prop
Dallin Watene-Zelezniak	Dally M Winger of the year, RLPA Dream team Winger

== Statistics ==
Player	Games	Starts	Minutes	Tries	Try Assists	Goals	Goal Kicking Percentage	Field goals	Points	Runs	Run Metres	Line Breaks	Tackle Breaks	Offloads	Kicks	Kick Metres	Tackles	Missed Tackles	Errors	Penalties	Sin Bins	Send Offs
Bunty Afoa	20	15	592	1	0	0	-	0	4	124	1,006	1	10	0	0	0	399	11	3	4	0	0
Tom Ale	18	1	443	1	0	0	-	0	4	131	1,104	1	13	1	0	0	254	13	3	2	0	0
Mitch Barnett	11	9	646	2	1	0	-	0	8	157	1,309	6	18	3	0	0	305	24	8	5	1	0
Rocco Berry	12	12	848	2	3	0	-	0	8	84	789	3	18	2	0	0	174	9	7	6	0	0
Josh Curran	19	5	891	4	0	0	-	0	16	120	949	5	19	11	2	27	416	42	9	4	0	0
Addin Fonua-Blake	23	23	1,378	8	3	0	-	0	32	379	3,618	8	65	31	0	0	567	25	9	7	1	0
Tohu Harris	20	20	1,363	3	4	0	-	0	12	243	2,047	4	23	6	0	0	714	45	5	8	0	0
Shaun Johnson	23	23	1,821	8	30	71	79%	2	176	71	579	9	40	8	383	11,863	405	37	18	13	0	0
Dallin Watene-Zelezniak	17	17	1,349	21	2	0	-	0	84	252	2,313	21	67	15	4	54	50	24	15	4	0	0
