= 2024 Dolphins (NRL) season =

2024 NRL rugby league season

2024 Dolphins season
- NRL Rank: 10th
- Play-off result: DNQ
- 2024 record: Wins: 11; losses: 13
- Points scored: For: 577; against: 578

Team information
- CEO: Terry Reader
- Head Coach: Wayne Bennett
- Captain: Jesse Bromwich (Rds 1–13, 16–25, 27) Kodi Nikorima (Rd 15) Mark Nicholls (Rd 26)
- Stadium: Suncorp Stadium, Kayo Stadium
- High attendance: 50,049 (Rd 26)
- Low attendance: 10,011 (Rd 2)

Top scorers
- Tries: Hamiso Tabuai-Fidow (14) (Rd 27); Jamayne Isaako (12)
- Goals: Jamayne Isaako (88) (Rd 27)
- Points: Jamayne Isaako (223) (Rd 27)
← 2023	List of seasons	2025 →

The 2024 Dolphins season was the Dolphins club's second season, and they finished tenth in the professional National Rugby League (NRL) football competition in Australia.

Head coach Wayne Bennett and regular team captain Jesse Bromwich continued in their same roles from the previous year. Bromwich retired from playing at the end of the season, and Bennett completed his three-year coaching commitment to the club.

In round 15 of the 2024 NRL season, the Dolphins achieved their first-ever win in Sydney when they defeated the Cronulla-Sutherland Sharks 30-28 at PointsBet Stadium. After previous defeats by the Brisbane Broncos, the Dolphins won the Battle for Brisbane derby 40-6 in round 26 on 31 August 2024 at Suncorp Stadium.

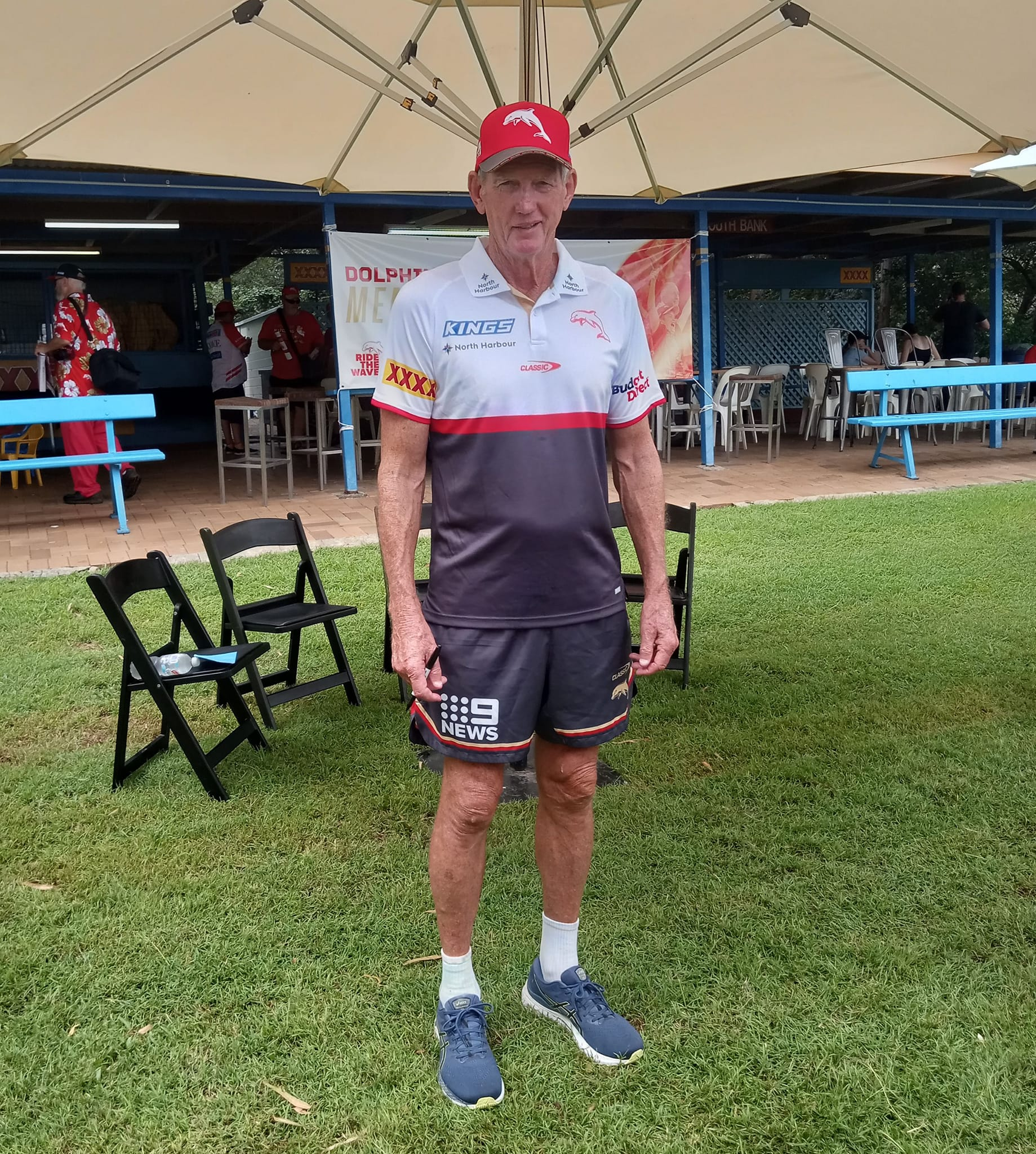
Dolphins NRL inaugural head coach Wayne Bennett

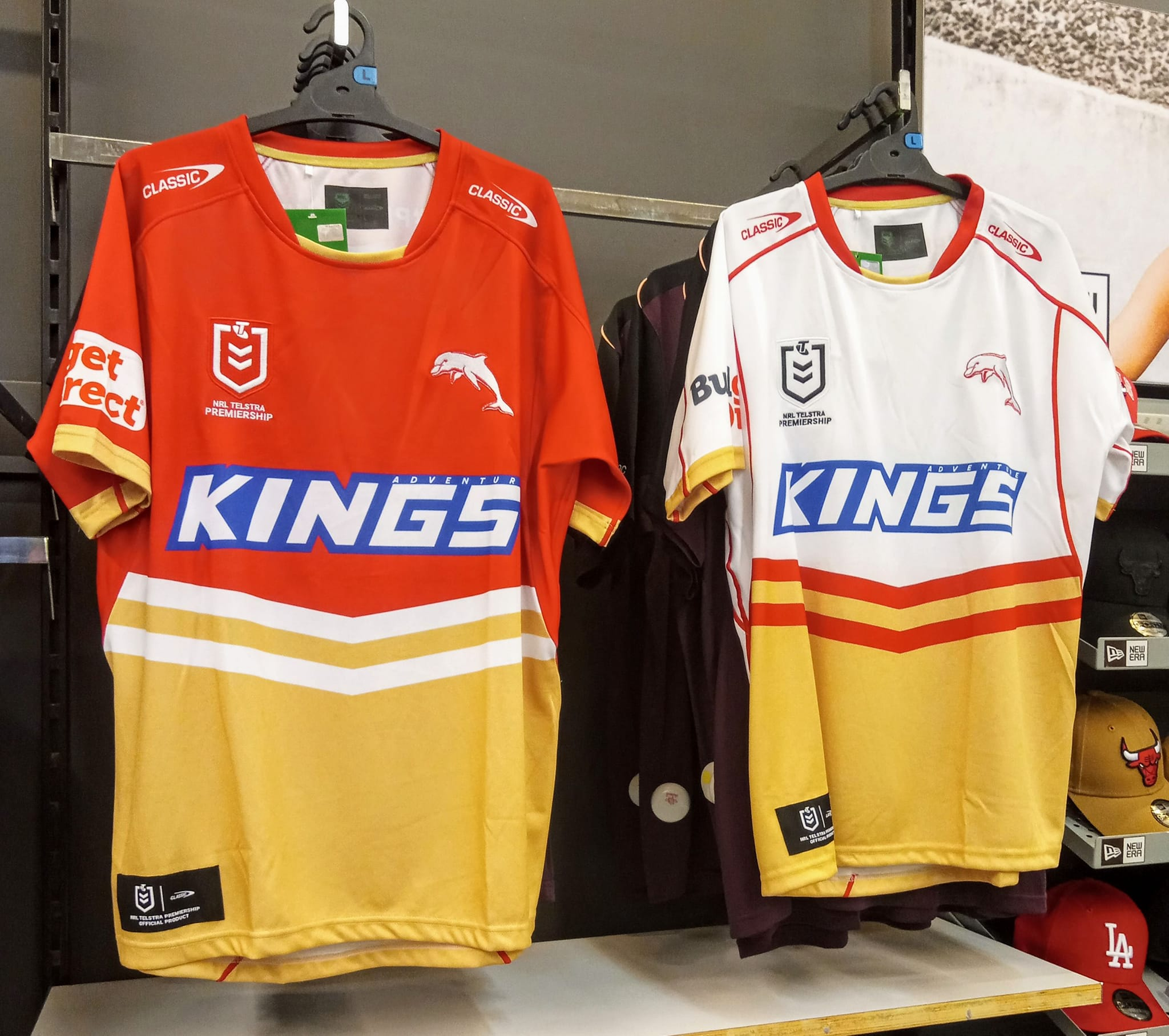
Dolphins NRL 2024 home and away jerseys (front view)

== Player movement ==
The following player movements happened across the previous season, off-season and pre-season.

=== Gains ===
Player	Previous club	Length
Jake Averillo	Canterbury-Bankstown Bulldogs	2026
Herbie Farnworth	Brisbane Broncos	2026
Thomas Flegler	Brisbane Broncos	2027
Oryn Keeley	Newcastle Knights	2026
Tevita Pangai Junior	Souths Logan Magpies (Hostplus Cup)	2024

=== Losses ===
Player	New Club
Herman Ese'ese	Hull FC (Super League)
Poasa Faamausili	Canterbury-Bankstown Bulldogs
Oliver Gildart	Hull Kingston Rovers (Super League)

== Pre-season challenge ==
The 2024 NRL pre-season was played in February, prior to the commencement of the regular 2024 NRL season in March.

Trial: 10 February 2024	Central Queensland Capras	6–58	Dolphins	Rockhampton
18:10 AEST	Tries: Reuben 7'; Hopoate 21'; Hopoate 21'; Goals: Donovan 1/2 9'	[Report Report]	Tries: O'Neill 35'; Karapani 37'; Stuckey 57'; Jackson 51'; Jenkins 58', 78'; Woolf 67'; Kaho 71'; Goals: Rogers 0/1 39', 68', 72', 79'; Baira 2/2 37', 40'; Hubner 2/2 52', 59'	Stadium: Browne Park

Round 1: 18 February 2024	Dolphins	26–14	Gold Coast Titans	Sunshine Coast
17:05 AEST	Tries: Farnworth 7'; Wallace 57'; Bostock 60'; Baira 66'; Lemuelu 74'; Goals: Isaako 0/1; Baira 3/5 58', 61', 68'	[Report Report]	Tries: Francis 18', 35'; Steadman 71'; Goals: Schoupp 1/3 72'	Stadium: Sunshine Coast Stadium; Attendance: 7,698; Referee: Chris Butler

Round 2: 24 February 2024	New Zealand Warriors	34–22	Dolphins	Auckland
17:45 NZDT	Tries: Montoya 13'; Barnett 18'; Watene-Zelezniak 26'; Berry 49'; Niukore 61'; Leiataua 78'; Goals: Johnson 4/4 15', 20', 27', 50'; Metcalf 1/2 63'	[Report Report]	Tries: Averillo 32'; Bostock 53'; Farnworth 67'; Te Whare 70'; Goals: Nikorima 1/1 15'; Isaako 1/1 55'; Katoa 1/2 67'	Stadium: Go Media Stadium; Attendance: 14,276; Referee: Liam Kennedy

== Regular season ==
=== League table ===
Pos	Team	Pld	W	D	L	B	PF	PA	PD	Pts	Qualification
1	Melbourne Storm	24	19	0	5	3	692	449	+243	44	Advance to finals series
2	Penrith Panthers (P)	24	17	0	7	3	580	394	+186	40	Advance to finals series
3	Sydney Roosters	24	16	0	8	3	738	463	+275	38	Advance to finals series
4	Cronulla-Sutherland Sharks	24	16	0	8	3	653	431	+222	38	Advance to finals series
5	North Queensland Cowboys	24	15	0	9	3	657	568	+89	36	Advance to finals series
6	Canterbury-Bankstown Bulldogs	24	14	0	10	3	529	433	+96	34	Advance to finals series
7	Manly Warringah Sea Eagles	24	13	1	10	3	634	521	+113	33	Advance to finals series
8	Newcastle Knights	24	12	0	12	3	470	510	−40	30	Advance to finals series
9	Canberra Raiders	24	12	0	12	3	474	601	−127	30	
10	Dolphins	24	11	0	13	3	577	578	−1	28	
11	St. George Illawarra Dragons	24	11	0	13	3	508	634	−126	28	
12	Brisbane Broncos	24	10	0	14	3	537	607	−70	26	
13	New Zealand Warriors	24	9	1	14	3	512	574	−62	25	
14	Gold Coast Titans	24	8	0	16	3	488	656	−168	22	
15	Parramatta Eels	24	7	0	17	3	561	716	−155	20	
16	South Sydney Rabbitohs	24	7	0	17	3	494	682	−188	20	
17	Wests Tigers	24	6	0	18	3	463	750	−287	18	

Source: National Rugby League
(P) Premiers

=== Result by round ===
Round	1	2	3	4	5	6	7	8	9	10	11	12	13	14	15	16	17	18	19	20	21	22	23	24	25	26	27
Ground	H	H	–	A	H	A	A	H	A	H	N	A	H	–	A	H	A	–	H	A	H	H	H	A	A	H	A
Result	L	W	B	W	W	L	W	L	W	W	W	L	L	B	W	L	L	B	W	L	L	L	W	L	L	W	L
Position	17	6	7	1	1	5	3	6	4	4	4	4	4	4	4	5	6	6	6	7	8	9	8	9	10	8	10
Points	0	2	4	6	8	8	10	10	12	14	16	16	16	18	20	20	20	22	24	24	24	24	26	26	26	28	28

Source: National Rugby League
A = Away; H = Home; N = Neutral; B = Bye; W = Win; D = Draw; L = Loss

=== Matches ===
Round 1: 10 March 2024	Dolphins	18–43	North Queensland Cowboys	Brisbane
15:05 AEST	Tries: Flegler 7'; Kerr 31'; Bostock 73'; Goals: Isaako 3/3 7', 31', 73'	[Report; Details Report]	Tries: Laybutt 2', 67'; Dearden 11'; Nanai 24'; Feldt 29'; Taulagi 35'; Luki 47'; Goals: Holmes 7/7 3', 13', 25', 30', 36', 48', 67'; Field goals: Townsend 1/1 39'	Stadium: Suncorp Stadium; Attendance: 32,477; Referee: Chris Butler

Round 2: 17 March 2024	Dolphins	38–0	St. George Illawarra Dragons	Redcliffe
17:15 AEST	Tries: Tabuai-Fidow 5', 59', 70'; Isaako 9'; Nicholls 47'; Averillo 57'; Marshall-King 68'; Goals: Isaako 5/7 7', 49', 59', 61', 70'	[Report; Details Report]	Sin bin: Molo (yellow card) 76' to 80'	Stadium: Kayo Stadium; Attendance: 10,011; Referee: Grant Atkins

Round 3 (Bye for Dolphins)

Round 4: 30 March 2024	Gold Coast Titans	14–30	Dolphins	Gold Coast
18:35 AEST	Tries: Jolliffe 8'; Sami 12', 74'; Goals: Boyd 1/3 9'	[Report; Details Report]	Tries: Bostock 23', 39'; Farnworth 57'; Tabuai-Fidow 63'; Kerr 68'; Goals: Isaako 5/5 24', 39', 57', 63', 68'; Sin bin: Plath (yellow card) 26' to 36'	Stadium: Cbus Super Stadium; Attendance: 13,898; Referee: Belinda Sharpe

Round 5: 6 April 2024	Dolphins	26–16	Wests Tigers	Brisbane
18:35 AEST	Tries: Katoa 4'; Tabuai-Fidow 25'; Nikorima 61'; K. Bromwich 65'; Goals: Isaako 5/6 10 (pen)', 24 (pen)', 27', 62', 66'	[Report; Details Report]	Tries: Faataape 42', 54'; Seyfarth 72'; Goals: Sezer 2/3 43', 74'	Stadium: Suncorp Stadium; Attendance: 22,051; Referee: Gerard Sutton

Round 6: 12 April 2024	Brisbane Broncos	28–14	Dolphins	Brisbane
20:00 AEST (UTC+10:00)	Tries: Willison 33'; Oates 44'; Walsh 51'; Cobbo 54', 58'; Goals: Walsh 4/5 35', 53', 56', 60'	[Report; Details Report]	Tries: Wallace 22'; Bostock 74'; Isaako 77'; Goals: Isaako 1/3 75'; Field goals: Isaako 1/1 40'	Stadium: Suncorp Stadium; Attendance: 46,224; Referee: Adam Gee

Round 7: 19 April 2024	Parramatta Eels	16–44	Dolphins	Darwin
19:30 ACST	Tries: Lane 16'; Penisini 26'; Brown 77'; Goals: Russell 0/2; Gutherson 2/2 45 (pen)', 78'	[Report; Details Report]	Tries: Bostock 30', 69', 74'; Niu 49', 71'; Fuller 51'; Plath 55', 57'; Averillo 63'; Goals: Isaako 3/7 50', 52', 56'; Nikorima 1/2 73'	Stadium: TIO Stadium; Attendance: 11,094; Referee: Todd Smith

Round 8: 28 April 2024	Dolphins	14–18	Newcastle Knights	Brisbane
14:00 AEST (UTC+10:00)	Tries: Keeley 25'; Isaako 77'; Averillo 78'; Goals: Isaako 1/3 26'	[Report; Details Report]	Tries: Armstrong 8'; Gagai 17'; Gamble 47'; Goals: Gagai 3/4 18', 49', 66 (pen)'	Stadium: Suncorp Stadium; Attendance: 18,033; Referee: Liam Kennedy

Round 9: 4 May 2024	North Queensland Cowboys	26–28	Dolphins	Townsville
19:35 AEST (UTC+10:00)	Tries: Feldt 3'; Cotter 6'; Nanai 29', 77'; McIntyre 39'; Goals: Holmes 3/5 8', 31', 39'; Field goals: Holmes 0/1 (2 pt)	[Report; Details Report]	Tries: Isaako 11', 32', 48'; Niu 22'; Averillo 67'; Goals: Isaako 4/5 12', 23', 33', 68'	Stadium: Queensland Country Bank Stadium; Attendance: 20,967; Referee: Peter Gough

Round 10: 9 May 2024	Dolphins	30–24	Manly Warringah Sea Eagles	Brisbane
19:50 AEST (UTC+10:00)	Tries: Aitken 13'; Lemuelu 33'; Fuller 35'; Nicholls 38'; Bostock 66'; Goals: Isaako 5/7 35', 37', 55 (pen)', 68', 78 (pen)'	[Report; Details Report]	Tries: Talau 9'; Waddell 22'; Koula 26'; Trbojevic 49'; Goals: Garrick 4/5 24', 27', 51', 64 (pen)'	Stadium: Suncorp Stadium; Attendance: 14,059; Referee: Ashley Klein

Round 11: 19 May 2024	Wests Tigers	12–24	Dolphins	Brisbane
18:25 AEST (UTC+10:00)	Tries: Olam 35'; Koroisau 53'; Goals: Koroisau 2/2 36', 55'; Sin bin: Naden (yellow card) 39' to 49'; Olam (yellow card) 46' to 56'	[Report; Details Report]	Tries: Bostock 12'; Nicholls 27'; Tabuai-Fidow 48', 69'; Goals: Isaako 5/7 13', 28', 50', 70'	Stadium: Suncorp Stadium; Attendance: 47,517; Referee: Chris Butler

Round 12: 26 May 2024	New Zealand Warriors	24–20	Dolphins	Auckland
18:05 NZST	Tries: Harris-Tavita 20'; Martin 32'; Watene-Zelezniak 57'; Niukore 66'; Goals: Pompey 4/4 22', 33', 59', 68'	[Report; Details Report]	Tries: Isaako 3', 75'; Farnworth 15'; Tabuai-Fidow 25'; Goals: Isaako 2/4 17', 27'	Stadium: Go Media Stadium; Attendance: 23,116; Referee: Peter Gough

Round 13: 1 June 2024	Dolphins	25–26 (g.p.)	Canberra Raiders	Redcliffe
19:35 AEST (UTC+10:00)	Tries: Marshall-King 8'; Bostock 23'; Averillo 43'; Donoghoe 67'; Goals: Isaako 4/4 10', 25', 44', 68'; Field goals: Isaako 1/3 71'	[Report; Details Report]	Tries: Savage 12'; Mariota 16'; Whitehead 31'; Weekes 56'; Goals: Rapana 4/4 13', 17', 32', 57'; Field goals: Rapana 2/3 77', 87'; Weekes 0/1 (2 pt)	Stadium: Kayo Stadium; Attendance: 10,024; Referee: Adam Gee

Round 14 (Bye for Dolphins)

Round 15: 13 June 2024	Cronulla-Sutherland Sharks	28–30	Dolphins	Cronulla
19:50 AEST (UTC+10:00)		[Report Report]		Stadium: PointsBet Stadium

Round 16: 21 June 2024	Dolphins	24–30	Melbourne Storm	Brisbane
20:00 AEST (UTC+10:00)	Tries: K. Bromwich 8'; Aitken 21'; Fuller 29'; Isaako 56'; Goals: Isaako 4/6 9', 22', 31', 77 pen'	[Report Report]	Tries: Papenhuyzen 11'; Wishart 26'; Hughes 36'; Warbrick 42'; King 52'; Goals: Meaney 5/6 12', 28', 37', 49 pen', 53'	Stadium: Suncorp Stadium; Attendance: 25,167; Referee: Liam Kennedy

Round 17: 30 June 2024	St. George Illawarra Dragons	26–6	Dolphins	Kogarah
14:00 AEST	Tries: Faitala-Mariner 46'; Tuipulotu 53'; Sloan 57'; De Belin 64'; Liddle 68'; Goals: Flanagan 3/6 34 pen', 59', 70'	[Report Report]	Tries: Niu 38'; Goals: Isaako 1/1 40'; Sin bin: Donoghoe (yellow card) 66' to 76'	Stadium: Nestrata Jubilee Stadium; Attendance: 8,052; Referee: Adam Gee

Round 18 (Bye for Dolphins)

Round 19: 11 July 2024	Dolphins	36–28	South Sydney Rabbitohs	Redcliffe
19:50 AEST (UTC+10:00)	Tries: Bostock 5'; Pangai Junior 19'; Farnworth 25'; Nikorima 48'; O'Sullivan 69'; Fuller 71'; Goals: Isaako 6/6 6', 21', 27', 49', 70', 72'	[Report Report]	Tries: Gray 10'; Gagai 22', 58', 79'; Johnston 64', 74'; Goals: Walker 1/3 11'; Milne 1/3 74'	Stadium: Kayo Stadium; Attendance: 10,023; Referee: Gerard Sutton

Round 20: 21 July 2024	Penrith Panthers	28–26 (g.p.)	Dolphins	Penrith
14:00 AEST (UTC+10:00)	Tries: Turuva 3'; Alamoti 19'; Leota 59'; Laurie 63'; Goals: Cleary 5/5 5', 21', 60', 64', 75 pen' Field goals: Cleary 81 (2pt)'	[Report Report]	Tries: Tabuai-Fidow 7', 22'; Katoa 13'; Bostock 51'; Goals: Isaako 5/5 8', 14', 24', 53', 55 pen' Sin bin: Kerr (yellow card) 74' to 81'	Stadium: BlueBet Stadium; Attendance: 20,955; Referee: Adam Gee

Round 21: 28 July 2024	Dolphins	14–21	Gold Coast Titans	Brisbane
16:05 AEST (UTC+10:00)	Tries: Pangai Junior 3'; J. Bromwich 12'; Goals: Isaako 3/3 5', 14', 21 pen' Sin bin: Kerr (yellow card) 37' to 47'	[Report Report]	Tries: Kelly 38'; Khan-Pereira 50', 58'; Haas 69'; Goals: Campbell 2/4 39', 71'; Field goals: Foran 73'	Stadium: Suncorp Stadium; Attendance: 19,533; Referee: Todd Smith

Round 22: 2 August 2024	Dolphins	34–40	Sydney Roosters	Perth
18:00 AWST (UTC+08:00)	Tries: Plath 13'; Kaufusi 24'; Isaako 27'; Tabuai-Fidow 43'; Bostock 70'; Goals: Isaako 6/6 15', 26', 29', 39 pen', 44', 71'; Katoa 1/1 76 pen'	[Report Report]	Tries: Sua'ali'i 4'; Walker 8', 17'; Tupou 46'; Tupouniua 49', 56'; Goals: Walker 8/8 5', 10', 19', 33 pen', 47', 51', 58', 66 pen' Sin bin: Manu (yellow card) 69' to 79'	Stadium: HBF Park; Attendance: 20,027; Referee: Gerard Sutton

Round 23: 11 August 2024	Dolphins	34–32 (g.p.)	New Zealand Warriors	Brisbane
14:00 AEST (UTC+10:00)	Tries: Kaufusi 8'; Farnworth 16', 52'; Nikorima 35'; Averillo 70'; Goals: Isaako 6/6 9', 18', 34 pen', 37', 54', 71'; Field goals: O'Sullivan 82'	[Report Report]	Tries: Kosi 21'; Capewell 42'; Leiataua 58'; Martin 64'; Sifakula 67'; Barnett 75'; Goals: Harris-Tavita 4/6 22', 43', 68', 76'; Sin bin: Walker (yellow card) 37' to 47'	Stadium: Suncorp Stadium; Attendance: 28,056; Referee: Wyatt Raymond

Round 24: 17 August 2024	Canterbury-Bankstown Bulldogs	30–10	Dolphins	Bundaberg
15:00 AEST (UTC+10:00)	Tries: Kiraz 10', 27'; Addo-Carr 35'; Xerri 66'; Tracey 68'; Goals: Burton 5/7 15 pen', 36', 49 pen', 67', 69'	[Report Report]	Tries: Isaako 24'; Averillo 38'; Goals: Isaako 1/2 39'	Stadium: Salter Oval; Attendance: 6,148; Referee: Adam Gee

Round 25: 24 August 2024	Melbourne Storm	48–6	Dolphins	Melbourne
20:00 AEST	Tries: Fa'alogo 19', 41'; Grant 28'; MacDonald 35'; Howarth 38'; Hughes 46'; Katoa 60'; Asofa-Solomona 69'; King 74'; Goals: Meaney 6/9 29', 36', 39', 48', 71', 76'	[Report Report]	Tries: Averillo 66'; Goals: Isaako 1/1 67'; Sin bin: Kaufusi (yellow card) 34' to 44'	Stadium: AAMI Park; Attendance: 26,106; Referee: Gerard Sutton

Round 26: 31 August 2024	Dolphins	40–6	Brisbane Broncos	Brisbane
17:30 AEST	Tries: Isaako 13'; Averillo 20', 33'; Tabuai-Fidow 28', 55'; Farnworth 47', 66'; Goals: Isaako 6/7 15', 21', 30', 34', 49', 57'; Sin bin: Kaufusi (yellow card) 17' to 27'	[Report Report]	Tries: Carrigan 24'; Goals: Staggs 1/1 25'; Sin bin: Willison (yellow card) 30' to 40'	Stadium: Suncorp Stadium; Attendance: 50,049; Referee: Adam Gee

Round 27: 5 September 2024	Newcastle Knights	14–6	Dolphins	Newcastle
19:50 AEST (UTC+10:00)		[Report Report]		Stadium: McDonald Jones Stadium

== 2024 Squad ==
Dolphins 2024 Squad
Top 30 squad – 2024 NRL season			Supplementary list	Coaching staff
Euan Aitken – SR; Jake Averillo – CE; Jack Bostock – WG; Jesse Bromwich (c) – PR; Kenny Bromwich – SR, LK, PR; Herbie Farnworth – CE; Thomas Flegler – PR; Harrison Graham – HK; Tom Gilbert – LK; Jamayne Isaako – WG	Robert Jennings – WG; Isaiya Katoa – HB; Felise Kaufusi – SR, PR; Oryn Keeley – SR; Josh Kerr – PR; Edrick Lee – WG; Connelly Lemuelu – SR, PR; Jeremy Marshall-King – HK; Anthony Milford – FE; Mark Nicholls – PR	Kodi Nikorima – FE; Tesi Niu – CE; Sean O'Sullivan – HB, FE; Tevita Pangai Junior – PR, SR; Max Plath – LK, HK; Ray Stone – LK; Hamiso Tabuai-Fidow – FB; Mason Teague – LK; Valynce Te Whare – CE, WG; Jarrod Wallace – PR	Kurt Donoghoe – LK; Ryan Jackson – PR; Jeremiah Simbiken – SR; James Walsh – CE; Michael Waqa – PR; Extended squad: Trai Fuller – FB; Lachlan Hubner – LK, SR	Head coach: Wayne Bennett; Assistant coaches: Nathan Fien; Kristian Woolf; Jeremy Hickmans (Head of Performance); Blake Duncan (Athletic Performance Coach); Elliot Jackson (Athletic Performance Coach); Medical professionals: Sam Madden (Head Physiotherapist); Adam Schumacher (Physiotherapist); John Davey (Head of Sports Science & Performance Analysis); Dr Peter Hackney (Doctor); Dr Brendan Thompson (Doctor); Legend: (c) Captain(s); (vc) Vice-captain(s); Development players; Extended squad; Updated: 5 September 2024; Source(s): NRL
