= List of New Zealand Warriors records =

The New Zealand Warriors (formerly Auckland Warriors) are a professional rugby league club in the National Rugby League (NRL), the premier rugby league football competition in Australasia.

Based in Auckland the Warriors were admitted to the Australian Rugby League (ARL) competition in 1995, a predecessor of the current NRL competition. Below is a list of individual and team records set since the club's introduction.

== Individual records ==
* indicates player still active.

=== Player of the Year (Simon Mannering Medal) ===
Year	Player
2025	Roger Tuivasa-Sheck
2024	Mitchell Barnett
2023	Shaun Johnson
2022	Euan Aitken
2021	Tohu Harris
2020	Tohu Harris
2019	Roger Tuivasa-Sheck
2018	Roger Tuivasa-Sheck
2017	Roger Tuivasa-Sheck
2016	Simon Mannering
2015	Ben Matulino
2014	Simon Mannering
2013	Simon Mannering
2012	Ben Matulino
2011	Simon Mannering
2010	Manu Vatuvei
2009	Micheal Luck
2008	Simon Mannering
2007	Steve Price
2006	Steve Price
2005	Ruben Wiki
2004	Wairangi Koopu
2003	Francis Meli
2002	Ali Lauitiiti
2001	Jerry SeuSeu
2000	Robert Mears
1999	Jason Death
1998	Joe Vagana
1997	Stacey Jones
1996	Stephen Kearney
1995	Tea Ropati

=== Most first grade games ===
- 301, Simon Mannering (2005–2018)
- 261, Stacey Jones (1995–2005, 2009)
- 226, Manu Vatuvei (2004–2017)
- 224, Shaun Johnson (2011–2018, 2022–2024)
- 212, Ben Matulino (2008–2017)
- 195, Logan Swann (1997–2003, 2007–2008)
- 188, Jacob Lillyman (2009–2017)
- 185, Lance Hohaia (2002–2011)
- 173, Sam Rapira (2006–2015)
- 170, Awen Guttenbeil (1996–2006)

=== Most tries for club ===
- 152, Manu Vatuvei (2004–2017)
- 79, Shaun Johnson (2011–2018, 2022–2024)
- 77, Stacey Jones (1995–2005, 2009)
- 74, Dallin Watene-Zelezniak (2021–2026)
- 63, Simon Mannering (2005–2018)
- 61, David Fusitu'a (2014–2021)
- 60, Francis Meli (1999–2005)
- 57, Clinton Toopi (1999–2006)
- 57, Lance Hohaia (2002–2011)
- 54, Jerome Ropati (2003–2014)
- 46, Solomone Kata (2015–2019)

=== Most tries in a season ===
Tries	Player	Season
24	Dallin Watene-Zelezniak	2023 (including finals; regular season record)
23	Francis Meli	2003 (including finals)
23	David Fusitu'a	2018 (including finals; regular season record)
20	Manu Vatuvei	2010 (including finals)
19	Sean Hoppe	1995
18	Clinton Toopi	2002
17	Clinton Toopi	2003
17	Manu Vatuvei	2014
16	Manu Vatuvei	2008
16	Manu Vatuvei	2013

=== Most points for club ===
- 1213 (79 tries, 440 goals, 17 field goals), Shaun Johnson (2011–2018, 2022–2024)
- 674 (77 tries, 176 goals, 14 field goals), Stacey Jones (1995–2005, 2009)
- 608 (152 tries), Manu Vatuvei (2004–2017)
- 547 (24 tries, 222 goals, 7 field goals), James Maloney (2010–2012)
- 439 (12 tries, 195 goals, 1 field goal), Ivan Cleary (2000–2002)
- 357 (57 tries, 64 goals, 1 field goal), Lance Hohaia (2002–2011)

=== Most points in a season ===
Points	Player	Season
224	Ivan Cleary	2002
184	James Maloney	2010
180	James Maloney	2011
177	Shaun Johnson	2013
169	Ivan Cleary	2001
163	Shaun Johnson	2014
160	Tony Martin	2006
153	Michael Witt	2007
153	James Maloney	2012
147	Stacey Jones	2005
142	Shaun Johnson	2018
138	Michael Witt	2008

=== Most points in a match ===
Points	Player	Details
28	Gene Ngamu	3 tries, 8 goals vs North Queensland, 1996 (won 52–6)
28	Ivan Cleary	1 try, 12 goals vs Northern Eagles, 2002 (won 68–10)
28	James Maloney	3 tries, 8 goals vs Brisbane Broncos, 2010 (won 48–16)
26	Shaun Johnson	3 tries, 7 goals vs Canberra Raiders, 2013 (won 50–16)
26	Shaun Johnson	2 tries, 9 goals vs Canberra Raiders, 2014 (won 54–12)
22	Tony Martin	1 try, 9 goals vs South Sydney, 2006 (won 46–14)
20	Ivan Cleary	1 try, 8 goals vs North Queensland, 2002 (won 50–20)
20	Francis Meli	5 tries vs Canterbury Bulldogs, 2003 (won 48–22)
20	Michael Witt	2 tries, 6 goals vs Penrith Panthers, 2007 (won 54–14)
20	Shaun Johnson	2 tries, 6 goals vs Gold Coast Titans, 2015 (won 36–14)

=== Top try scorers ===
Year	Player	Tries
1995	Sean Hoppe	19
1996	John Kirwan	10
1997	Sean Hoppe	11
1998	Nigel Vagana	13
1999	Stacey Jones	15
2000	Nigel Vagana	12
2001	Henry Fa'afili	14
2002	Clinton Toopi	18
2003	Francis Meli	23
2004	Francis Meli	10
2005	Todd Byrne	15
2006	Brent Webb	11
2007	Jerome Ropati / Grant Rovelli / Manu Vatuvei	10
2008	Manu Vatuvei	16
2009	Manu Vatuvei	13
2010	Manu Vatuvei	18
2011	Manu Vatuvei	12
2012	Manu Vatuvei / Shaun Johnson / Konrad Hurrell	12
2013	Manu Vatuvei	16
2014	Manu Vatuvei	17
2015	Solomone Kata	12
2016	Solomone Kata	15
2017	David Fusitu'a	12
2018	David Fusitu'a	23
2019	Ken Maumalo	17
2020	Peta Hiku	8
2021	Reece Walsh	9
2022	Dallin Watene-Zelezniak	9
2023	Dallin Watene-Zelezniak	24
2024	Dallin Watene-Zelezniak	15

== Club records ==
=== Highest home game attendance ===
- 32,174 vs the Illawarra Steelers at Ericsson Stadium in Round 6 of the 1995 ARL season

=== Biggest wins ===
Margin	Score	Opponent	Venue	Year
66	66–0	South Sydney Rabbitohs	Telstra Stadium	2006
58	68–10	Northern Eagles	Mt Smart Stadium	2002
48	48–0	Parramatta Eels	Mt Smart Stadium	2014
46	52–6	North Queensland Cowboys	Mt Smart Stadium	1996
44	60–16	Western Suburbs	Campbelltown Sports Stadium	1999
44	52–8	Penrith Panthers	Mt Smart Stadium	2001

=== Biggest losses ===
Margin	Score	Opponent	Venue	Year
60	6–66	Gold Coast Titans	Cbus Super Stadium	2024
60	10–70	Melbourne Storm	AAMI Park	2022
56	6–62	Penrith Panthers	Penrith Stadium	2013
54	0–54	St. George Illawarra Dragons	WIN Stadium	2000
52	6–58	Sydney Roosters	Sydney Football Stadium	2004
46	10–56	Melbourne Storm	Olympic Park Stadium	2000
46	6–52	Manly-Warringah Sea Eagles	Brookvale Oval	2008

=== Kept opposition to nil ===
Score	Opponent	Venue	Year
66–0	South Sydney Rabbitohs	Telstra Stadium	2006
48–0	Parramatta Eels	Mt Smart Stadium	2014
42–0	Gold Coast Titans	Mt Smart Stadium	2014
42–0	Newcastle Knights	Mt Smart Stadium	1999
30–0	Cronulla-Sutherland Sharks	Mt Smart Stadium	2001
26–0	North Queensland Cowboys	Mt Smart Stadium	2006
18–0	St George illawarra Drangons	Central Coast Stadium	2020
14–0	Wests Tigers	Mt Smart Stadium	2009

=== Kept to nil ===
Score	Opponent	Venue	Year
0–54	St. George Illawarra Dragons	WIN Stadium	2000
0–44	Sydney Roosters	Sydney Football Stadium	2002
0–42	Melbourne Storm	Melbourne Rectangular Stadium	2016
0–36	St George Illawarra Dragons	Westpac Stadium	2015
0–32	Sydney Roosters	Mt Smart Stadium	2018
0–30	Melbourne Storm	Mt Smart Stadium	2009
0–24	North Queensland Cowboys	Mt Smart Stadium	1999
0–24	Sydney Roosters	Allianz Stadium	2015
0–14	Sydney Roosters	Mt Smart Stadium	2023

=== Most consecutive wins ===
Wins	First round	Last round
8	Round 7, 2002	Round 14, 2002
7	Round 19, 2023	Round 26, 2023

=== Most consecutive losses ===
Losses	First round	Last round
9	Round 17, 2017	Round 26, 2017
8	Round 19, 2012	Round 26, 2012
8	Round 19, 2015	Round 26, 2015
7	Round 17, 2000	Round 23, 2000
7	Round 20, 2004	Round 1, 2005

=== Most consecutive home wins ===
Wins	First round	Last round
7	Round 18, 2008	Round 1, 2009

=== Most consecutive away wins ===
Wins	First round	Last round
5	Round 8, 2002	Round 16, 2002

=== Most consecutive home losses ===
Losses	First round	Last round
6	Round 24, 1998	Round 9, 1999

=== Most consecutive away losses ===
Losses	First round	Last round
7	Round 5, 2009	Round 17, 2009

=== Biggest comeback ===
Recovered from a 21-point deficit.

- Trailed to Canberra 31–10 after 51 minutes to win 34–31 at GIO Stadium on 27 March 2021

Recovered from a 20-point deficit.

- Trailed to Cronulla-Sutherland 20–0 after 21 minutes to win 30–32 at Pointsbet Stadium on 2 April 2023

Recovered from a 20-point deficit.

- Trailed to Newcastle 20–0 after 39 minutes to win 30–26 at EnergyAustralia Stadium on 17 April 2005

Recovered from a 16-point deficit.

- Trailed to Canterbury 24–8 after 75 minutes to draw 24 all at Westpac Stadium on 7 April 2001

=== Worst collapse ===
Surrendered a 26-point lead.

- Led Penrith 32–6 after 59 minutes to draw 32–32 at CUA Stadium on 1 August 2009

Surrendered a 22-point lead.

- Led Penrith 28–6 after 46 minutes to lose 36–28 at Pepper Stadium on 13 May 2017

Surrendered a 16-point lead (three times).

- Led Newcastle 16–0 after 34 minutes to lose 36–26 at Mt Smart Stadium on 16 March 2003
- Led Canterbury 16–0 after 21 minutes to lose 22–18 (in extra time) at ANZ Stadium on 9 July 2006
- Led Canberra 22-6 after 46 minutes to lose 42–22 Mt Smart Stadium on 2 September 2012

=== Golden point record ===
Played 20: won 7, lost 9, drawn 4

- Won 31–30 vs South Sydney Rabbit

ohs, Round 16, 2003

- Lost 26–28 vs North Queensland Cowboys, Round 15, 2004
- Lost 29–30 vs Canberra Raiders, Round 20, 2004
- Lost 18–22 vs Canterbury Bulldogs, Round 18, 2006
- Draw 31–31 vs Sydney Roosters, Round 21, 2007
- Won 17–16 vs Sydney Roosters, Round 6, 2009
- Draw 14–14 vs Melbourne Storm, Round 7, 2009
- Draw 32–32 vs Penrith Panthers, Round 21, 2009
- Won 17–13 vs Parramatta Eels, Round 10, 2015
- Won 32–28 vs Sydney Roosters, Round 5, 2016
- Lost 18–19 vs Cronulla Sharks, Round 16, 2016
- Lost 14–15 vs Manly Sea Eagles, Round 19, 2016
- Lost 22–26 vs Canberra Raiders, Round 20, 2016
- Won 20–16 vs Penrith Panthers, Round 21, 2016
- Lost 21–22 vs Manly Sea Eagles, Round 25, 2017
- Lost 18–19 vs Penrith Panthers, 2019, Round 15
- Draw 18–18 vs Brisbane Broncos, 2019, Round 17
- Lost 18–19 vs St George Illawarra Dragons, 2021, Round 16
- Won 25–24 vs North Queensland Cowboys, 2022, Round 5
- Lost 26–27 vs Gold Coast Titans, 2022, Round 25
- Won 21–20 vs Canberra Raiders, 2023, Round 21
- Won 20–18 vs Brisbane Broncos, 2025, Round 7

=== All time premiership record 1995–2018 ===
Note: 18 of those 588 games were in the finals (8 wins, 10 losses).

Games	Won	Drawn	Lost	Win percentage	Points for	Points against	Points differential
632	288	8	336	46.20%	13104	14083	−979
