= 2024 Dolphins season =

2024 Dolphins season may refer to:

- 2024 Dolphins (NRL) season
- 2024 Miami Dolphins season
