= List of New Zealand Warriors seasons =

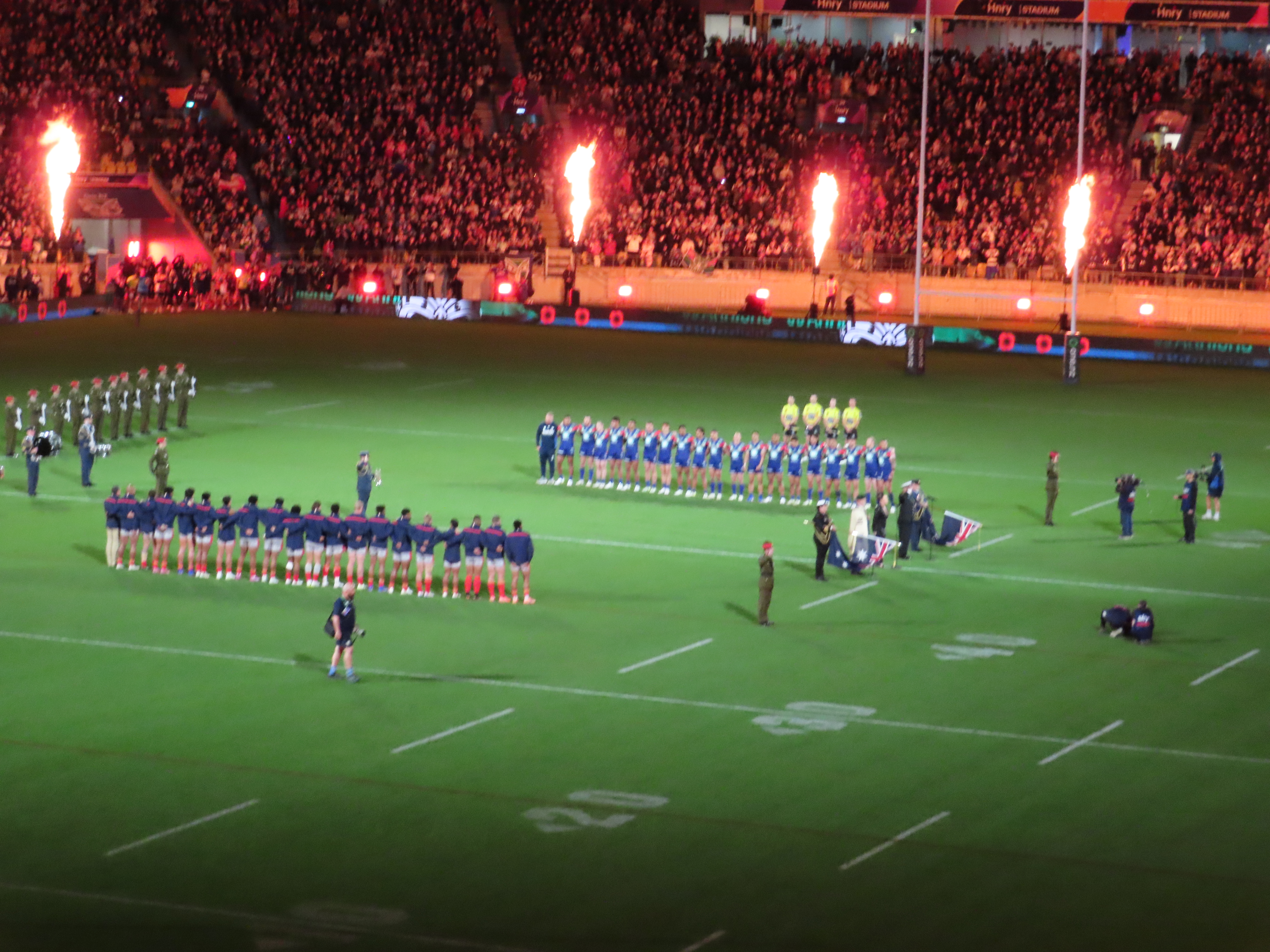
The Warriors playing against the Dolphins on Anzac Day 2026 during their 32nd season.

This is a list of seasons of the rugby league team the New Zealand Warriors from their debut season in the Winfield Cup in 1995 to present day in the National Rugby League. The Warriors were known as the Auckland Warriors until 2000.

The club fielded a women's team in the first three seasons of the NRL Women's Premiership before going into recess.

== Seasons ==
=== Men's team ===
Table key
#	Competition conducted by Australian Rugby League
~	Competition conducted by Super League
‡	Club finished regular season in first position (J. J. Giltinan Shield)
†	Club finished regular season in last position (wooden spoon)
DNQ	Club did not qualify for finals

Table of yearly win–loss records, with finals results, and key personnel
Season	Club	WCC	Regular season				Finals results			Coach	Captain(s) (Note: Official club captains.)	Ref
Season	Club	WCC	Pos.	W	L	D	Final position	W	L	Coach	Captain(s)	Ref
1995#	1995	—N/a	10th	13	9	0	DNQ			John Monie	Dean Bell	
1996#	1996	—N/a	11th	10	11	0	DNQ			John Monie	Greg Alexander	
1997~	1997	Semi	7th	7	11	0	DNQ			John Monie → Frank Endacott	Matthew Ridge	
1998	1998	—N/a	15th	7	15	0	DNQ			Frank Endacott	Matthew Ridge	
1999	1999	—N/a	11th	10	14	0	DNQ			Mark Graham	Matthew Ridge	
2000	2000	—N/a	13th	8	16	2	DNQ			Mark Graham	John Simon	
2001	2001	—N/a	8th	12	12	2	Lost qualifying final	0	1	Daniel Anderson	Kevin Campion & Stacey Jones	
2002	2002	—N/a	1st‡	17	7	0	Runners-up	2	1	Daniel Anderson	Stacey Jones	
2003	2003	—N/a	5th	15	9	0	Lost preliminary final	2	1	Daniel Anderson	Monty Betham	
2004	2004	—N/a	14th	6	18	0	DNQ			Daniel Anderson → Tony Kemp	Monty Betham	
2005	2005	—N/a	11th	10	14	0	DNQ			Tony Kemp	Steve Price	
2006	2006	—N/a	10th	12	12	0	DNQ			Ivan Cleary	Steve Price	
2007	2007	—N/a	4th	13	10	1	Lost semi final	0	2	Ivan Cleary	Steve Price	
2008	2008	—N/a	8th	13	11	0	Lost preliminary final	2	1	Ivan Cleary	Steve Price	
2009	2009	—N/a	14th	7	15	2	DNQ			Ivan Cleary	Steve Price	
2010	2010	—N/a	5th	14	10	0	Lost qualifying final	0	1	Ivan Cleary	Simon Mannering	
2011	2011	—N/a	6th	14	10	0	Runners-up	2	2	Ivan Cleary	Simon Mannering	
2012	2012	—N/a	14th	8	16	0	DNQ			Brian McLennan → Tony Iro	Simon Mannering	
2013	2013	—N/a	11th	11	13	0	DNQ			Matthew Elliott	Simon Mannering	
2014	2014	—N/a	9th	12	12	0	DNQ			Matthew Elliott → Andrew McFadden	Simon Mannering	
2015	2015	—N/a	13th	9	15	0	DNQ			Andrew McFadden	Simon Mannering	
2016	2016	—N/a	10th	10	14	0	DNQ			Andrew McFadden	Ryan Hoffman	
2017	2017	—N/a	13th	7	17	0	DNQ			Stephen Kearney	Roger Tuivasa-Sheck	
2018	2018	—N/a	8th	15	9	0	Lost elimination final	0	1	Stephen Kearney	Roger Tuivasa-Sheck	
2019	2019	—N/a	13th	9	14	1	DNQ			Stephen Kearney	Roger Tuivasa-Sheck	
2020	2020	—N/a	10th	8	12	0	DNQ			Stephen Kearney → Todd Payten	Roger Tuivasa-Sheck	
2021	2021	—N/a	12th	8	16	0	DNQ			Nathan Brown	Roger Tuivasa-Sheck	
2022	2022	—N/a	15th	6	18	0	DNQ			Nathan Brown → Stacey Jones	Tohu Harris	
2023	2023	—N/a	4th	16	8	0	Lost preliminary final	1	2	Andrew Webster	Tohu Harris	
2024	2024	—N/a	13th	9	14	1	DNQ			Andrew Webster	Tohu Harris	
2025	2025	—N/a	6th	14	11	0	Lost elimination final	0	1	Andrew Webster	Mitchell Barnett & James Fisher-Harris	
2026	2026	—N/a	2nd	18	6	0	Lost semi final	0	2	Andrew Webster	Mitchell Barnett & James Fisher-Harris	

=== Women's team ===
Table key
‡	Club finished regular season in first position (minor premiers)
†	Club finished regular season in last position (wooden spoon)
DNQ	Club did not qualify for finals

Table of yearly win–loss records, with finals results, and key personnel
Season	Club	Regular season				Finals results			Coach	Captain(s)	Ref
Season	Club	Pos.	W	L	D	Final position	W	L	Coach	Captain(s)	Ref
2018	2018	3rd	1	2	0	DNQ			Luisa Avaiki	Laura Mariu	
2019	2019	3rd	2	1	0	DNQ			Luisa Avaiki	Laura Mariu	
2020	2020	3rd	1	2	0	DNQ			Brad Donald	Georgia Hale	
2025	2025	8th	4	7	0	DNQ			Ronald Griffiths	Apii Nicholls	
2026	2026	7th	4	7	0	DNQ			Ronald Griffiths	Apii Nicholls	
