= Kalani Going =

New Zealand rugby league footballer

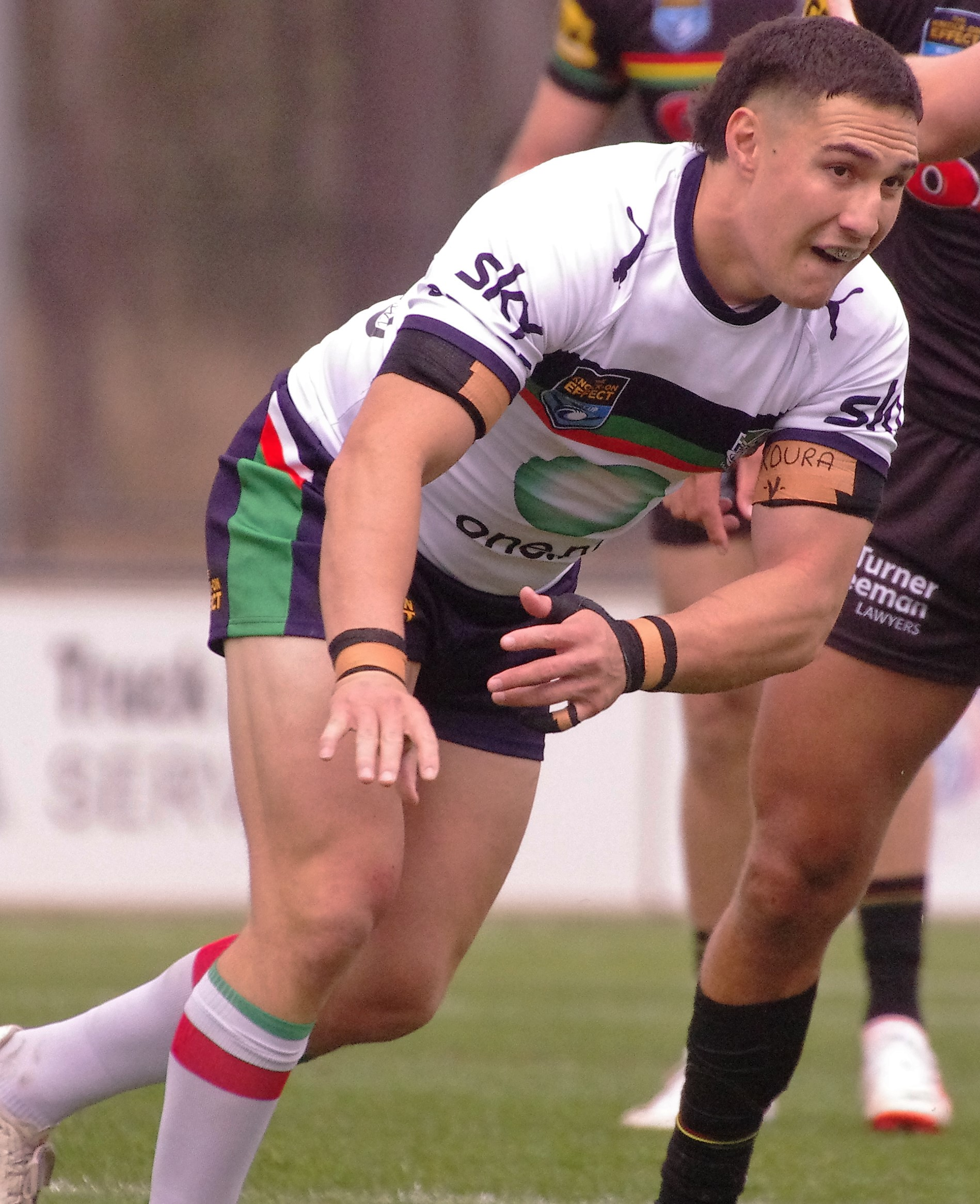

Personal information
- Full name: Kalani Going
- Born: 14 January 1997 (age 29) Whangārei, New Zealand
- Height: 178 cm (5 ft 10 in)
- Weight: 98 kg (15 st 6 lb)

Playing information
- Position: Lock, Second-row, Hooker
Club
Years	Team	Pld	T	G	FG	P
2023	New Zealand Warriors	1	0	0	0	0
2026–	Penrith Panthers	4	0	0	0	0
	Total	5	0	0	0	0
- Source: As of 3 July 2026

Kalani Going is a New Zealand rugby league footballer who plays as a lock and second-row forward for the Penrith Panthers in the National Rugby League (NRL).

== Playing career ==
=== 2023 ===
Going made his first grade debut in round 27 against the Dolphins.

=== 2024 ===
Going secured a development contract for the 2025 season.

=== 2025 ===
On 28 September, he played in New Zealand's 30-12 NSW Cup Grand Final victory over St. George Illawarra. On 31 October, the Panthers announced that Going had signed for the 2026 season.

=== 2026 ===
On 13 September 2026, Penrith announced that Going had re-signed with the club for a further year. In September, he played for Penrith's NSW Cup side in their grand final victory over Newtown.
