= Trai Fuller =

Australian rugby league player

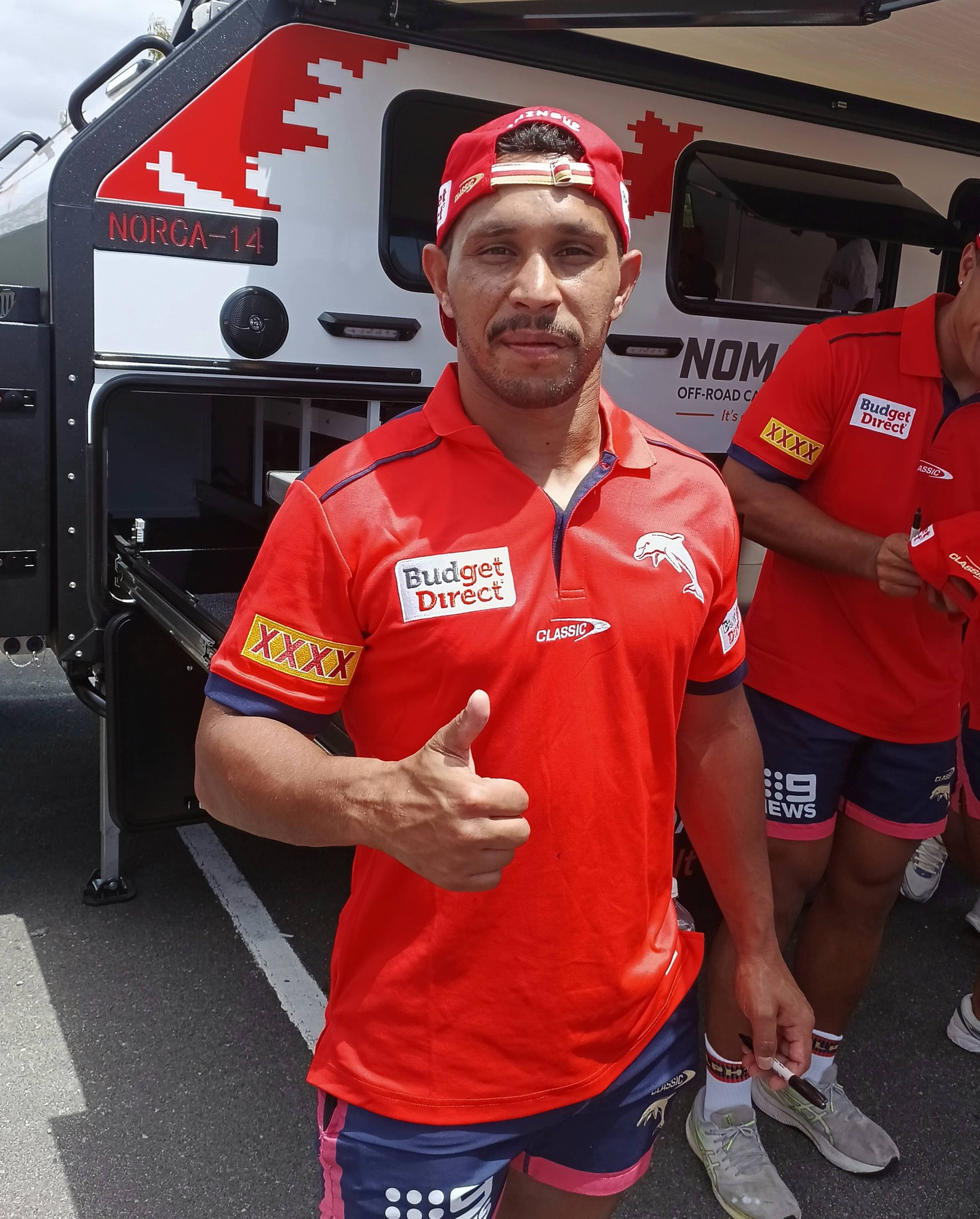

Personal information
- Born: 8 April 1997 (age 29) Monto, Queensland, Australia
- Height: 170 cm (5 ft 7 in)
- Weight: 78 kg (12 st 4 lb)

Playing information
- Position: Fullback
Club
Years	Team	Pld	T	G	FG	P
2023–	Dolphins	23	9	0	0	36
Representative
Years	Team	Pld	T	G	FG	P
2025	Prime Minister's XIII	1	4	0	0	16
- Source: As of 16 November 2026

Trai Fuller is an Australian rugby league footballer who plays as a fullback for the Dolphins in the National Rugby League and the Redcliffe Dolphins in the Queensland Cup.

== Background ==
Fuller is a descendant of the Wulli Wulli Indigenous tribe. He was born in Monto, Queensland, to Victoria West who has three children. Fuller was raised in the nearby town of Eidsvold, where he spent most of his childhood and adolescence. Throughout his youth, he participated in junior rugby league clubs, including the Eidsvold Eagles, Maryborough Wallaroos, Burrum Miners, Emerald Tigers, Gracemere Cubs, Saint Brendan’s and Capras Rockhampton, before joining the Redcliffe Dolphins. He attended Eidsvold State School, Emerald State High School and Saint Brendan’s College during his secondary education. Fuller is the father of three children and is married to Kiara Fuller.

== Career ==
Fuller was a part of the Brisbane Broncos under 20s squad before signing with the Redcliffe Dolphins. Fuller made his Queensland Cup debut for the Redcliffe Dolphins in 2018, helping them win their first title in thirteen years.

=== Dolphins (2023 - ) ===
In Round 25 of the 2023 NRL season, Fuller made his NRL debut for the Dolphins against the Wests Tigers in a 23–24 loss at Western Sydney Stadium.

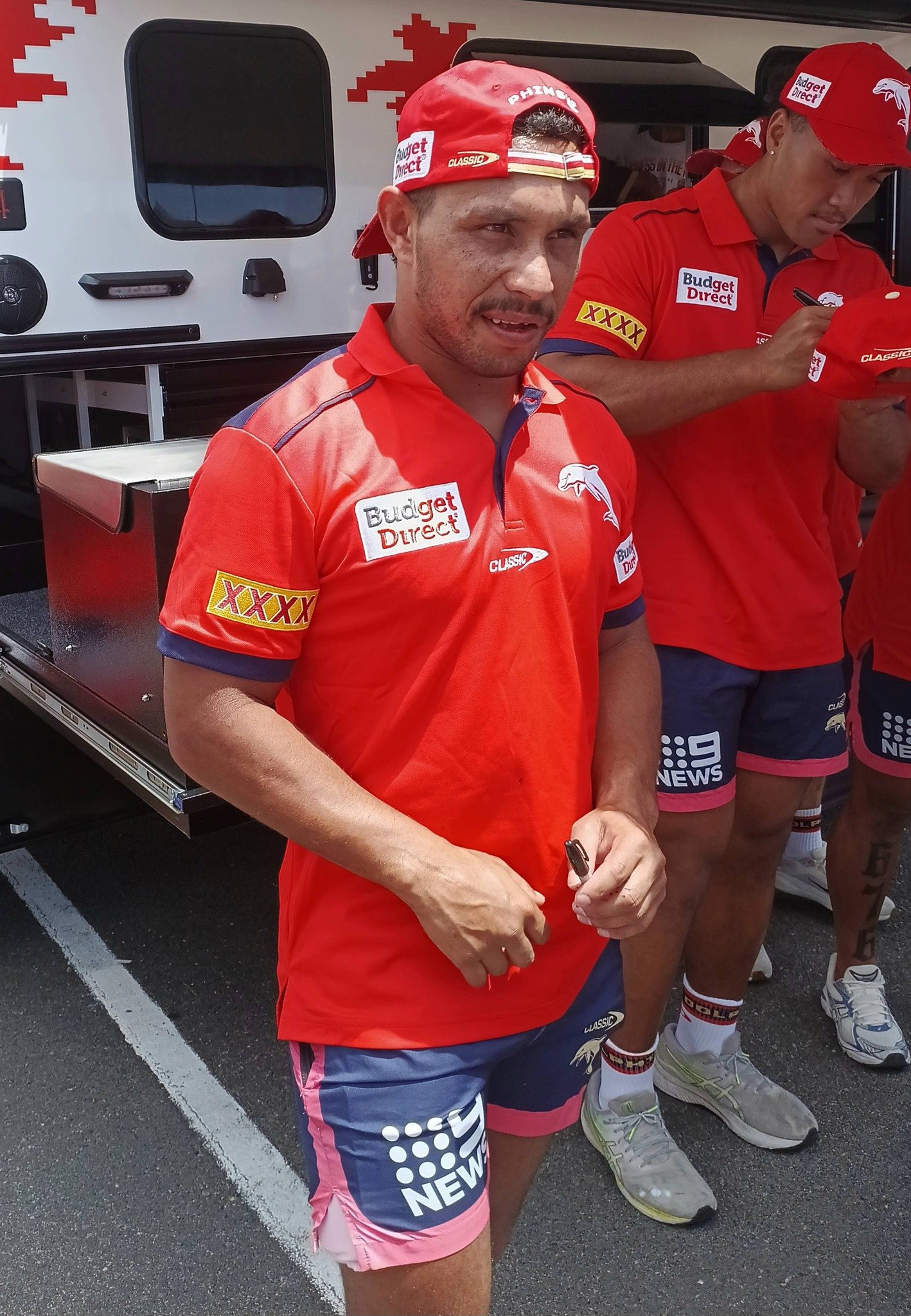
Trai Fuller in 2026

On 24 July 2024, Fuller was upgraded to the Dolphins Top 30 squad and his contract was extended until the end of the 2026 season. On 17 September, the Dolphins confirmed Fuller had ruptured his ACL while playing with the Dolphins feeder team Redcliffe which ultimately ruled him out of the Redcliffe Dolphins grand final against the Norths Devils, the team later confirmed he would return to the field mid-season in 2025.

On 6 October 2025, Fuller was named in the PM's XIII squad to face PNG Prime Minister's XIII. In the game on 12 October 2025, he scored four tries and Australia won 28-10.

On 9 June 2026, the Dolphins announced that Fuller extended his contract for a further year

The Fullback played 7 NRL games in 2026 but was a key part of Redcliffe's run to the Queensland Cup premiership. Although Fuller was suspended for the QRL grand final he did play in their subsequent 14-68 win over the Penrith Panthers in the NRL State Championship final.

== Statistics ==
Year	Team	Games	Tries	Pts
2023	Dolphins	1	1	4
2024	Dolphins	11	4	16
2025	Dolphins	4	2	8
2026	Dolphins	7	2	8
2027	Dolphins			
	Totals	23	9	36
