= Shaun Johnson =

New Zealand international rugby league footballer

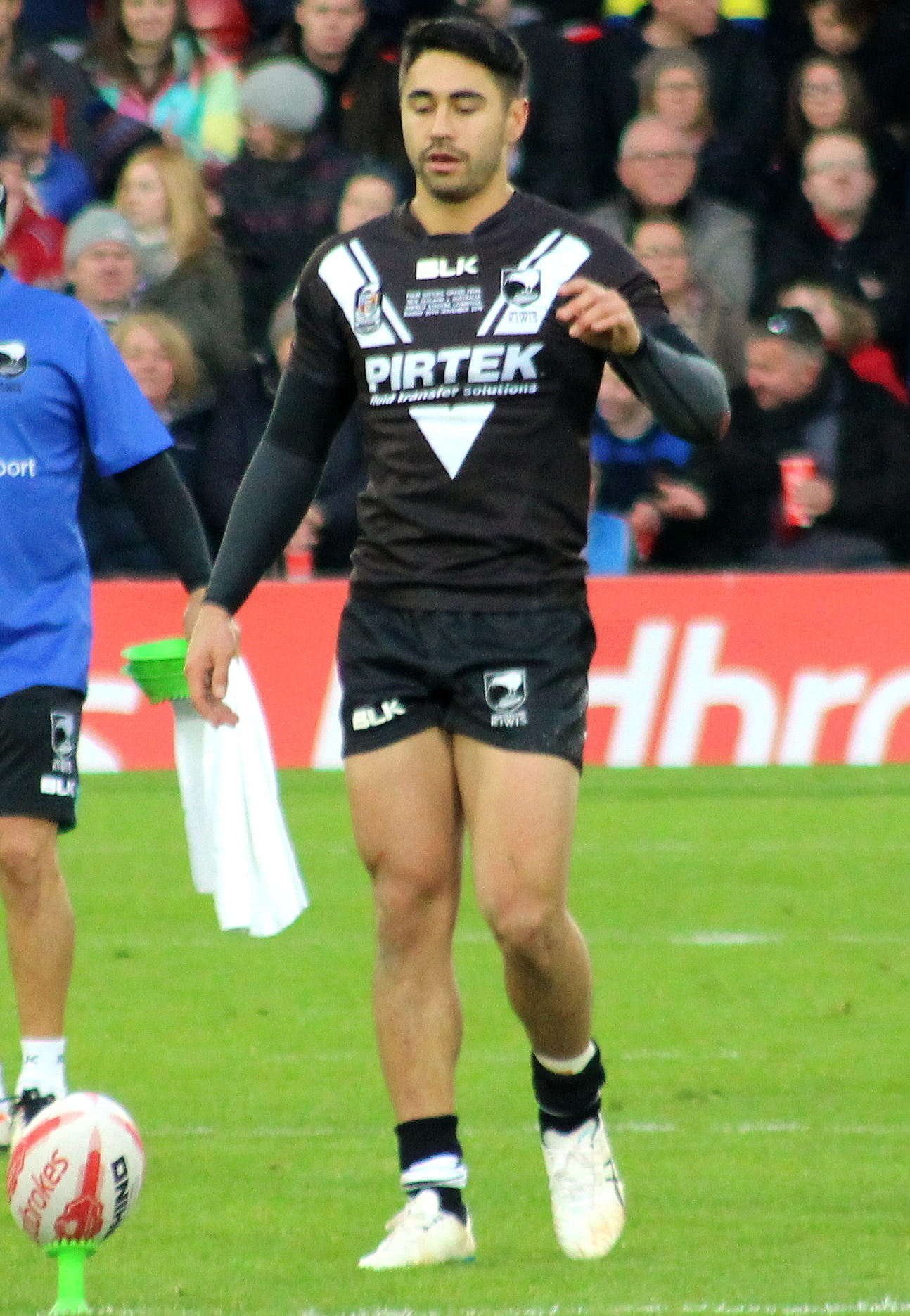

Personal information
- Full name: Shaun Ly Johnson
- Born: 9 September 1990 (age 36) Auckland, New Zealand

Playing information
- Height: 179 cm (5 ft 10 in)
- Weight: 91 kg (14 st 5 lb)
- Position: Halfback, Five-eighth
Club
Years	Team	Pld	T	G	FG	P
2011–18	New Zealand Warriors	162	63	326	13	917
2019–21	Cronulla Sharks	44	6	119	1	263
2022–24	New Zealand Warriors	62	16	114	4	296
	Total	268	85	559	18	1476
Representative
Years	Team	Pld	T	G	FG	P
2012–24	New Zealand	35	14	84	1	225
2013	NRL All Stars	1	0	0	0	0

Shaun Ly Johnson (born 9 September 1990) is a New Zealand former professional rugby league footballer who last played as a halfback for the New Zealand Warriors in the National Rugby League and New Zealand at international level.

Johnson is regarded as one of New Zealand’s greatest rugby league players, often compared to Benji Marshall and Stacey Jones. He is the highest point scorer for the Warriors.

Johnson has also played for the Cronulla-Sutherland Sharks as a five-eighth in the NRL and for the NRL All Stars. In 2014, Johnson was awarded the Golden Boot for the world's best player.

== Background ==
Johnson was born in Auckland, New Zealand, his mother is Laotian and his father is a New Zealander.

From the Whangaparāoa Peninsula, Johnson attended Whangaparaoa Primary School, as well as Orewa College, and played many sports, including basketball, rugby union and Australian rules football (representing New Zealand at Under 16 level), but made his name playing touch and Rugby League. He represented New Zealand in both touch and Rugby League and played rugby union in his school's First XV.

== Playing career ==
=== Early years ===
Johnson played for the Hibiscus Coast Raiders in the Auckland Rugby League competition before being signed by the New Zealand Warriors in 2009.

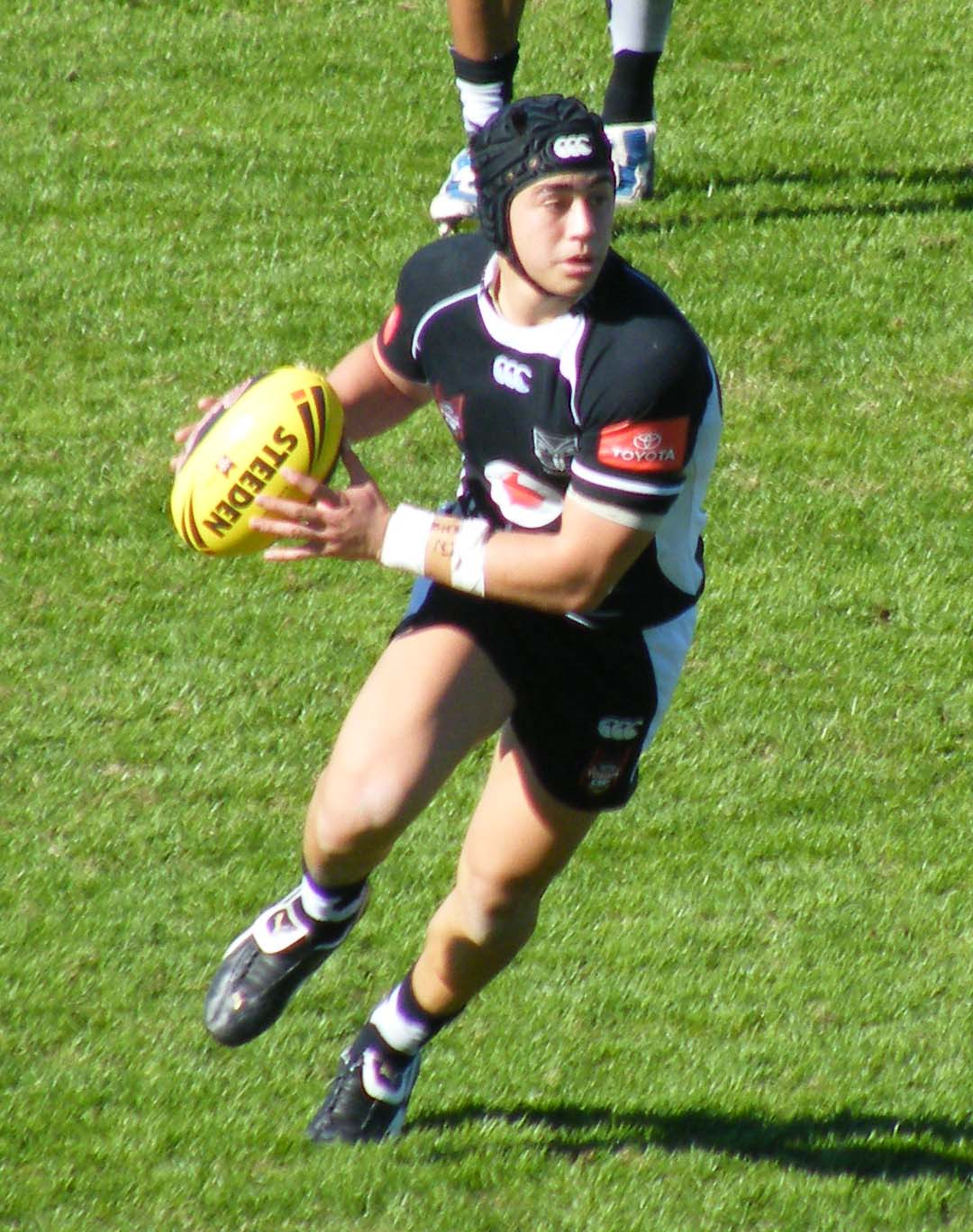
Johnson playing for the Junior Warriors in 2009

Johnson started his professional career playing for the Junior Warriors in the Toyota Cup. In March 2009, league great Andrew Johns commented: "I haven't been this excited about a player in a long time." Johns was referring to the first time he saw Stacey Jones play, which was in 1995, when Stacey was a junior. Johnson spent the 2009 and 2010 seasons with the Junior Warriors and played 45 matches, scoring 25 tries, 159 goals and 4 field goals to finish his Toyota Cup career with 422 points. Johnson made his NSW Cup debut for the Auckland Vulcans in 2010 and also represented the Junior Kiwis that year. His final Toyota Cup match was being part of the Junior Warriors winning the 2010 Grand Final.

=== 2011 ===
After suffering an injury in the pre-season, Johnson spent the start of the 2011 season with the Auckland Vulcans before making his National Rugby League debut in Round 13 against the Sydney Roosters due to an injury to Brett Seymour. In his next match in Round 14 against the Wests Tigers at Mt Smart Stadium, Johnson scored his first NRL try in the Warriors 26–22 loss. In Round 22 against the Brisbane Broncos at Suncorp Stadium, Johnson scored an outstanding 70-metre solo try in the Warriors 20–21 loss. In the 2011 Preliminary Final against the Melbourne Storm, Johnson set up a mesmerising try for Lewis Brown to seal the game in the 76th minute to beat the Storm 20–12 at AAMI Park, The Warriors made it to the Grand Final, playing the Manly Sea Eagles. The Warriors lost to the Sea Eagles 24–10 in the 2011 NRL Grand Final however Johnson played a tremendous game and almost sparked a surprise comeback with a role in both tries and a few outstanding runs. Johnson finished his debut year in the NRL with him playing 16 matches and scoring 6 tries for the Warriors in the 2011 NRL season.

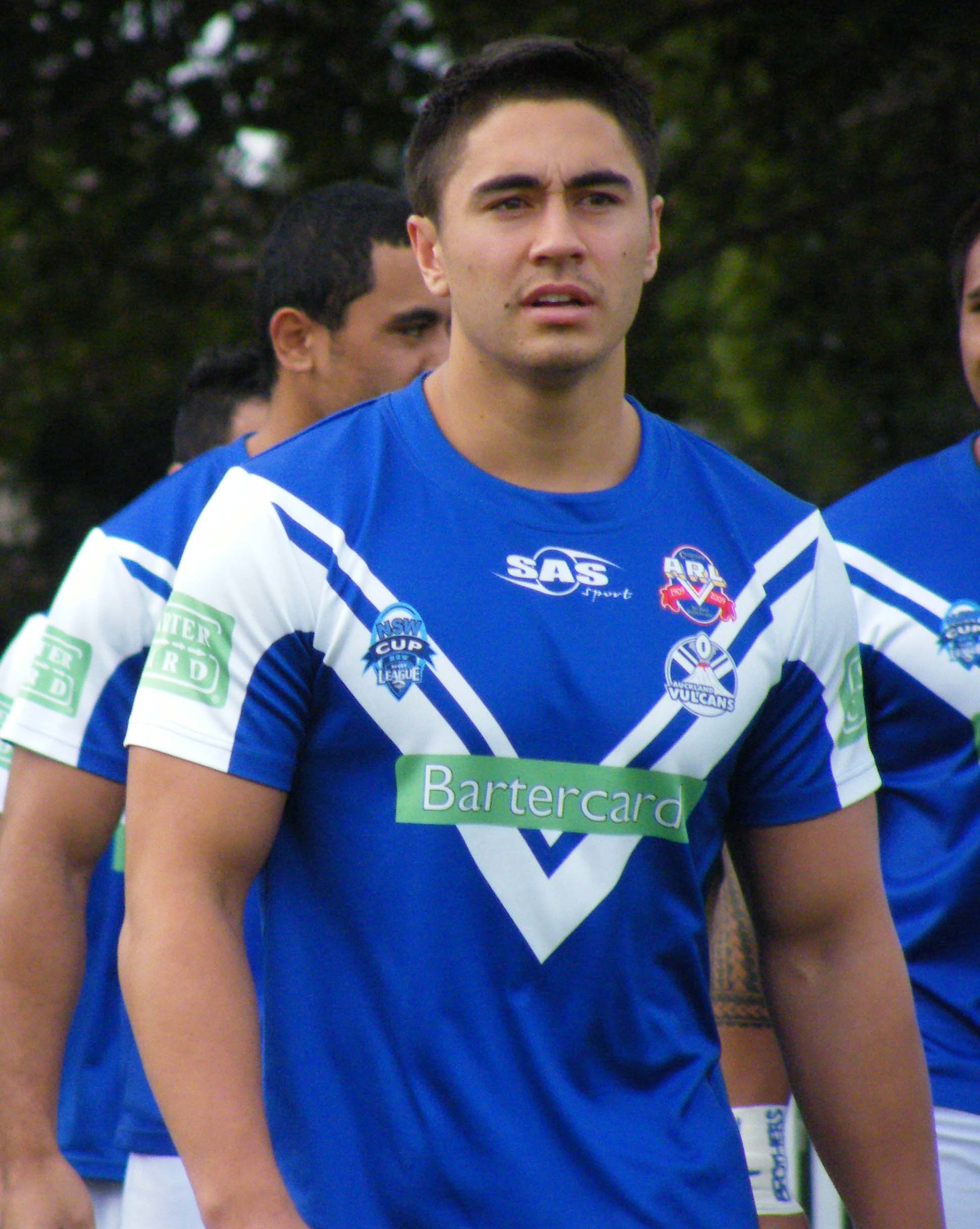
Johnson playing for the Auckland Vulcans in 2011

Johnson was named in the New Zealand national rugby league team squad for the 2011 Four Nations but withdrew with an injury. On 27 November 2011, Johnson re-signed with the Warriors until the end of the 2014 season.

=== 2012 ===
Due to Kieran Foran's hamstring injury, Johnson was selected as halfback for the New Zealand national team in the 2012 Anzac Test. In his debut test match Johnson scored an 80-metre intercept try at Eden Park in the Kiwis 20–12 loss. Along with Konrad Hurrell and Manu Vatuvei, Johnson was the 2012 New Zealand Warriors season top try-scorer with 12 in 22 matches. Johnson also received the Rugby League International Federation's Rookie of the Year award for 2012.

=== 2013 ===
On 13 February 2013, Johnson was chosen to play in the 2013 All Stars match for the NRL All Stars team, playing off the interchange bench in the 32–6 loss to the Indigenous All Stars at Suncorp Stadium.

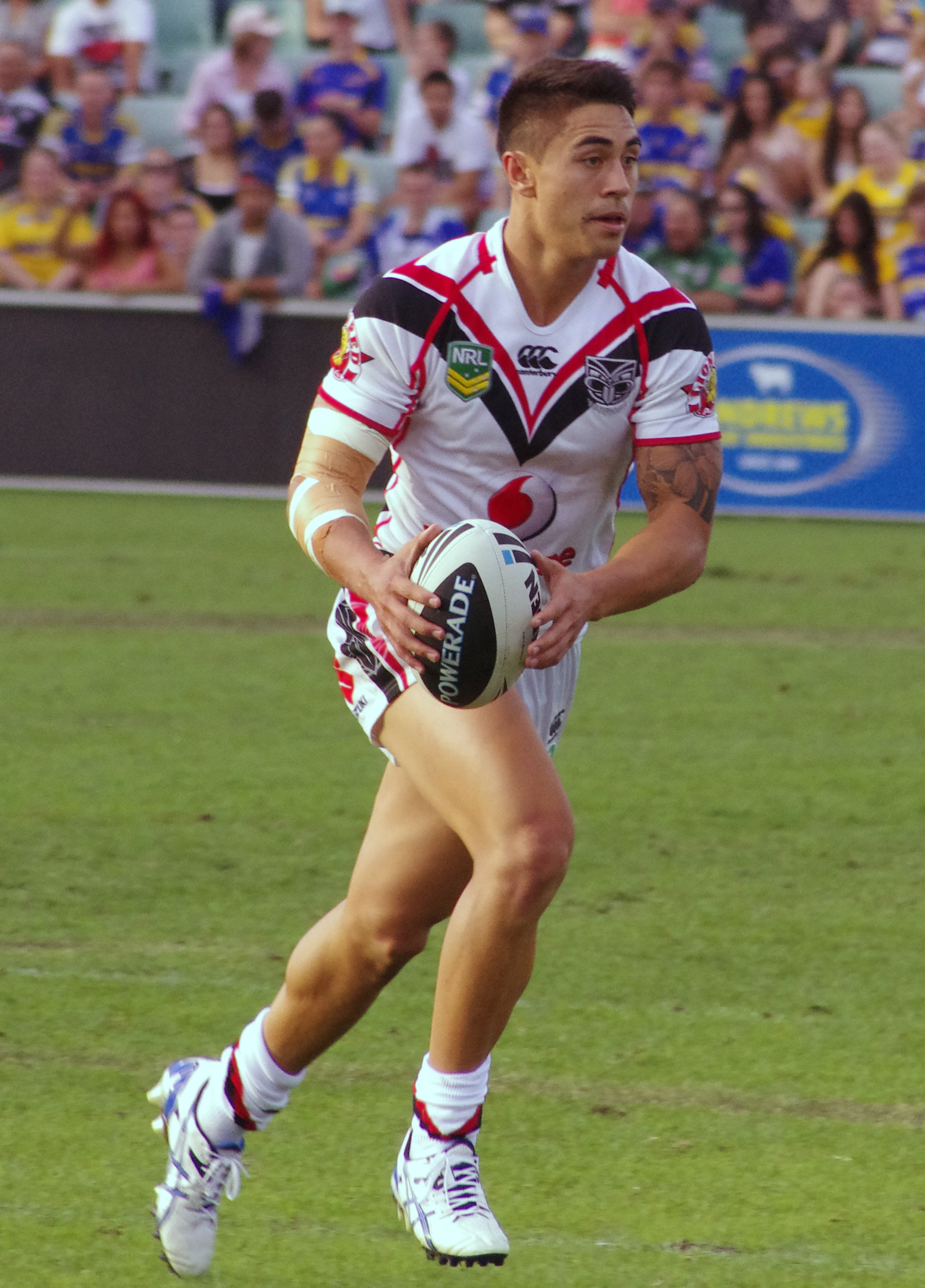
Johnson playing for the Warriors in 2013

For the 2013 Anzac Test, Johnson was selected to play halfback for New Zealand, kicking two goals from two attempts in their 32–12 loss against Australia at Canberra Stadium. In Round 14 against the Sydney Roosters, Johnson chased down Michael Jennings after the latter picked up a loose ball and sprinted toward an undefended try line, Warriors later won the match 23–12 at SFS. Johnson played in all the Warriors' 24 matches and scored 10 tries in the 2013 NRL season.

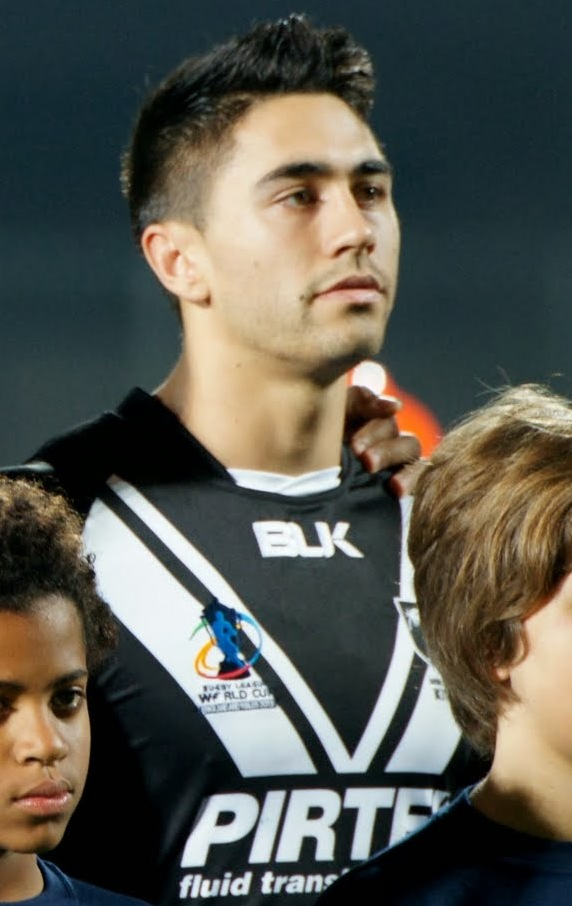
Johnson lining up for the Kiwis at 2013 RLWC

Following the end of the season, Johnson was selected in New Zealand 2013 Rugby League World Cup squad. In the Rugby League World Cup Semi Finals on 24 November against England at Wembley Stadium, after the game was locked-up at 8-all at halftime and England lead 18–14, with seconds to go in the game, Johnson scored the final try of the game in the 80th minute, stepping and sliding through a hole to level the score at 18-all and then converting his own try to seal the win and to cement the Kiwis' place in the World Cup final. Following the Kiwis 34–2 World Cup Final loss to Australia at Old Trafford, Johnson finished the tournament as the top points-scorer with 76 points (4 tries and 30 goals).

=== 2014 ===
In February 2014, Johnson played in the Warriors inaugural NRL Auckland Nines squad and was the tournament's top point scorer with 40 points. He was named the tournament's most valuable player. On 9 February 2015, Johnson re-signed with the Warriors on a 3-year contract to the end of the 2017 season. He was selected for New Zealand in the 2014 Anzac Test against Australia at halfback and kicked 3 goals in the Kiwis 30–18 loss at the SFS. By the end of the Warriors 2014 NRL season he had played in 21 matches, scoring 9 tries, kicking 63 goals and a field goal. On 7 October 2014, Johnson was selected in New Zealand's 2014 Four Nations squad. On 15 November 2014, Johnson was instrumental in leading the Kiwi side to a 22–18 victory in the 2014 Four Nations final against Australia. He received the man of the match award after his performance, which included two assists and one try. On 18 December 2014, Johnson won the Rugby League World Golden Boot Award for best player in the world, beating the likes of Sam Burgess, Johnathan Thurston and Greg Inglis.

=== 2015 ===
On 16 January 2015, Johnson was named captain of the Warriors 2015 Auckland Nines squad. Johnson was selected for New Zealand in the 2015 Anzac Test against Australia at halfback, scoring a try and kicking 3 goals in the Kiwis 26–12 win at Suncorp Stadium. In Round 9 against the Cronulla Sharks, Johnson scored one of the best tries of the 2015 season when he evaded 5 defenders to score the try which won the match for the Warriors 20–16 in the last minute at Remondis Stadium. In Round 20 against the Manly Sea Eagles, Johnson suffered a season-ending ankle injury while scoring a try in the Warriors 32–12 loss at Mt Smart Stadium. Johnson finished the 2015 NRL season with him playing in 18 matches, scoring 8 tries, kicking 48 goals and 2 field goals for the Warriors.

=== 2016 ===
On 29 January, Johnson was named as the captain of the Warriors 2016 Auckland Nines squad, On 6 May 2016, Johnson played for the New Zealand national rugby league team against Australia, playing at halfback in the 16–0 loss at Hunter Stadium. Shaun Johnson was part of the Four Nations 2016 New Zealand Kiwis side that made it to the Final of the tournament, losing to the Australian Kangaroos 34–8.

=== 2017 ===
Shaun Johnson became New Zealand rugby league's greatest test points scorer as the Kiwis beat Scotland 74–6. Johnson's second-half try broke Matthew Ridge's record of 168 points. His 22-points total from the Rugby League World Cup match took him to 175 points.

=== 2018 ===
After helping to guide the Warriors back to the finals the Warriors were bundled out by the Penrith Panthers in the first round of the NRL playoffs. On 27 November Johnson was granted an immediate release from the final year of his contract with the New Zealand Warriors. On 1 December, Cronulla announced that they had signed Johnson on a three-year deal.

On 10 December, Johnson spoke to the media after leaving the New Zealand Warriors and took aim at his former coach Stephen Kearney saying “I’ve been at Auckland for eight years and had six coaches, The sixth coach didn't like me, so what".

Johnson then went on to speak about his motivations for joining Cronulla saying "They're a club that want to do well," Johnson said of the Warriors. "They're a club that's looking to win a premiership and if they don't see me as worthy of what they were paying me that's fine. If it was all about the money I would have stayed there. I would have stayed and played my contract out. I'm here to win a premiership at Cronulla".

=== 2019 ===
Johnson made his debut for Cronulla in round 1 of the 2019 NRL season against Newcastle which ended in a 14–8 loss. Johnson scored his first try for Cronulla in round 5 against the Sydney Roosters at Shark Park which ended in a 30–16 loss. In round 7, Johnson was taken from the field in Cronulla's 29–6 loss against Brisbane which was later revealed to be a torn hamstring and was ruled out for 4–6 weeks.

In round 15, Johnson scored a try but missed all three attempts at goal as Cronulla suffered a shock 14–12 loss against last placed Canterbury-Bankstown at ANZ Stadium. The following week against Brisbane, Johnson was relieved of his goal kicking duties which were taken over by Chad Townsend. Johnson was later substituted in the second half by coach John Morris as Cronulla lost 24–22. This was the third game in a row the club had lost due to poor goal kicking.

Johnson made a total of 18 appearances for Cronulla in his first season at the club as they finished in 7th spot on the table and qualified for the finals. Johnson played in the club's elimination final defeat by Manly at Brookvale Oval.

=== 2020 ===
In round 19 of the 2020 NRL season, Johnson was taken from the field during the second half in Cronulla's match against the Sydney Roosters with a serious leg injury. Before being injured, Johnson had a league-high 23 try assists. It was later revealed that Johnson had snapped his Achilles tendon and was ruled out for the remainder of the year.

=== 2021 ===
In round 7 of the 2021 NRL season, Johnson made his return to the Cronulla side in an 18–12 loss against Canterbury at Kogarah Oval.

On 3 June, Johnson was informed by the Cronulla club that his services would not be required beyond the 2021 NRL season.

In round 14 against Penrith, Johnson kicked the winning field goal as Cronulla won the match 19–18.

On 25 June, it was announced that Johnson would re-join the New Zealand Warriors on a two-year deal. On 27 July, it was revealed that Johnson would be ruled out from playing for at least eight weeks after suffering a hamstring injury. On 2 August, it was announced that Johnson would miss the rest of the 2021 NRL season.

=== 2022 ===
In round 5 of the 2022 NRL season, Johnson kicked the winning field goal for the New Zealand Warriors in their 25–24 golden point victory over North Queensland. In round 8, Johnson kicked a field goal in golden point extra time to win the game for New Zealand 21–20 over Canberra. Johnson made a total of 21 appearances for the New Zealand club as they finished 15th on the table.

=== 2023 ===
After a few mediocre seasons, with the playing quality he started his career with far behind him, Johnson silenced all critics who said he needed to be playing in reserve grade, by starting the season strong with a 4–1 record. Johnson made major improvements to his all-around game, particularly his kicking game and playmaking ability.

In round 5 of the 2023 NRL season, Johnson kicked a penalty goal with less than one minute remaining as the New Zealand Warriors defeated Cronulla 32–30 at Shark Park. The club at half-time trailed the match 26–6. In his post-game interview, Johnson ended the interview by saying “Up The Wahs, baby”. From that point on, the phrase Up The Wahs would end up taking New Zealand by storm.

In round 14, Johnson scored two tries and kicked five goals as New Zealand defeated the Dolphins 30–8. In round 19, in a game against the Parramatta Eels, Johnson became just the fifth player to appear 200 times as a New Zealand Warriors player. Johnson would end up winning that game 46–10 against an understrength Parramatta side. In round 21, Johnson kicked a field goal in golden point extra-time to win the game for the New Zealand Warriors 21–20 against Canberra. In round 23, Johnson scored two tries for New Zealand in their 28–18 victory over the Gold Coast.

On 4 September, Johnson was awarded the Simon Mannering Medal as the Warriors' Player Of The Year. Johnson also won the Players' Player Of The Year and the One New Zealand People’s Choice award chosen by the public. He was selected in the RLPA’s Team Of The Year, voted by NRL players as the best halfback in 2023.

Johnson finished the season leading the league in try assists, total kicks and kick metres. Johnson’s career resurgence resulted in the Warriors’ first top 4 finish since 2008, qualifying for their first finals since 2018. Johnson missed the Week 1 Finals loss to Penrith due to a calf injury. He returned the following week with two line break assists and two try assists in the New Zealand Warriors victory against Newcastle. The New Zealand Warriors ultimately fell short in the preliminary final, losing to the Brisbane Broncos.

On 27 September, Johnson was named the 2023 Dally M Halfback of the Year and finished as the runner-up for the Dally M Medal.

=== 2024 ===
In round 5 of the 2024 NRL season, Johnson scored two tries for New Zealand in their 34–4 victory over South Sydney. On 25 June, it was announced that Johnson would miss at least a month with an Achilles tendon injury. On 5 August, Johnson announced his retirement from the NRL. During round 25 the Warriors home stadium for the match was named the Shaun Johnson Stadium. Johnson played his final NRL match in round 26 playing against Cronulla, setting up a match winning try in the final play of his career.

On October 10, 2024, he made his return for international duty since 2019 to replace Jahrome Hughes for the New Zealand Kiwis’ Pacific Championships campaign against the Kangaroos and Tonga.

== Personal life ==
Johnson married Silver Fern Kayla Johnson (nee Cullen) in Byron Bay 2019. The couple have two daughters who were born in 2020 and 2023.

== Career stats ==
Year	Team	Appearances	Tries	Goals	Goal-kicking %	Field goals	Points
2011 NRL Season	New Zealand Warriors	16	6	–	–	–	24
2012 NRL Season	New Zealand Warriors	22	12	–	–	–	48
2013 NRL Season	New Zealand Warriors	24	10	67/89	75.28%	3	177
2014 NRL Season	New Zealand Warriors	21	9	63/83	75.90%	1	163
2015 NRL Season	New Zealand Warriors	18	8	48/70	68	2	130
2016 NRL Season	New Zealand Warriors	24	10	42/57	73	1	125
2017 NRL Season	New Zealand Warriors	18	4	45/57	78	2	108
2018 NRL Season	New Zealand Warriors	19	4	61/80	76.25%	4	142
2019 NRL Season	Cronulla-Sutherland Sharks	18	3	45/59	76.27%	–	102
2020 NRL Season	Cronulla-Sutherland Sharks	16	2	56/73	76.71%	–	120
2021 NRL Season	Cronulla-Sutherland Sharks	10	1	18/20	90.00%	1	41
2022 NRL Season	New Zealand Warriors	21	3	14/18	77.78%	2	42
2023 NRL Season	New Zealand Warriors	24	8	71/89	79.78%	2	176
2024 NRL Season	New Zealand Warriors	16	5	29			78
	Totals	268	85	559		18	1476

== Cricket career ==
Johnson made his Debut for Team Cricket in the Back Clash cricket series (T20 Format) held at Christchurch in New Zealand in January 2025. Johnson faced only 3 balls hitting them for 5 runs and getting 1 Four before getting out. He managed to take a wicket during the match dismissing Colin Slade for 16 runs off 10 balls, playing a crucial part in Team Crickets 5 Run Victory.
