= Marata Niukore =

Cook Islands & NZ international rugby league footballer

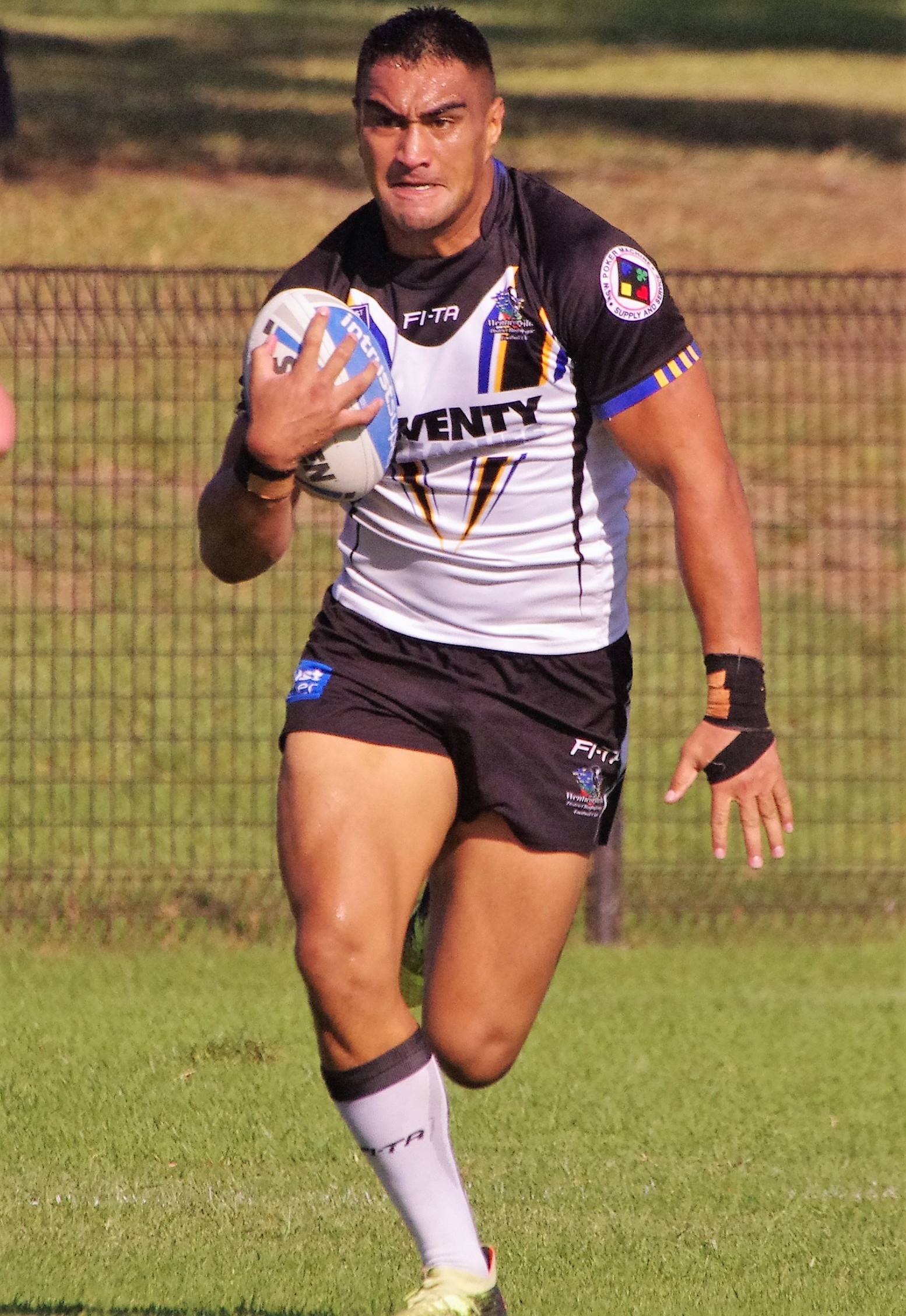

Personal information
- Full name: Marata Niukore
- Born: 29 July 1996 (age 30) Auckland, New Zealand
- Height: 191 cm (6 ft 3 in)
- Weight: 106 kg (16 st 10 lb)

Playing information
- Position: Second-row, Lock, Prop, Centre
Club
Years	Team	Pld	T	G	FG	P
2018–22	Parramatta Eels	96	9	0	0	36
2023–26	New Zealand Warriors	70	10	0	0	40
2027–	Newcastle Knights	0	0	0	0	0
	Total	166	19	0	0	76
Representative
Years	Team	Pld	T	G	FG	P
2017–25	Cook Islands	4	4	0	0	16
2022–24	New Zealand	6	1	0	0	4
- Source: As of 16 November 2026

Marata Niukore (born 29 July 1996) is a professional rugby league footballer who plays as a second-row, lock and centre for the New Zealand Warriors in the National Rugby League (NRL). He has played for both the Cook Islands and New Zealand at international level. Niukore has signed with the Newcastle Knights on a 3 years deal starting in 2027

He previously played for the Parramatta Eels in the NRL.

== Background ==
Niukore was born in Māngere, Auckland, New Zealand.

== Career ==
=== 2018 ===
He started his career with the New Zealand Warriors Under 20s before being signed by the Parramatta Eels until the end of 2018 and playing for Wentworthville Magpies in the NSW Cup. Niukore made a total of 40 appearances for Wentworthville over 2 seasons. He represented the Cook Islands against Papua New Guinea in 2017.

In round 11 of the 2018 NRL season, Niukore made his NRL debut for Parramatta against the New Zealand Warriors.

Niukore ended the 2018 NRL season for Parramatta with 14 appearances for the club.

=== 2019 ===
In round 1 of the 2019 NRL season, Niukore started at second-row for Parramatta scoring his first NRL try against the Penrith Panthers in a 20–12 win.

On November 4 2019, it was announced that Niukore had signed a three-year deal to remain at Parramatta until the end of the 2022 season.

=== 2020 ===
He made a total of 17 appearances for Parramatta in the 2020 NRL season as the club finished third but were eliminated from the finals in straight sets.

=== 2021 ===
At the start of the 2021 NRL season, Niukore replaced the injured Waqa Blake at centre. In round 9 of the 2021 NRL season, he was placed on report for a high tackle on Sydney Roosters player James Tedesco and was later suspended for two matches.

In round 22, Niukore was sent to the sin bin during Parramatta's 56–10 loss against Manly. Niukore made a total of 21 games for Parramatta and played in both of the club's finals matches against Newcastle and Penrith. Parramatta were eliminated by Penrith at the semi-final stage in a tough 8–6 loss.

On 11 November, Niukore signed with the New Zealand Warriors on a four-year $2.6 million starting in 2023, until the end of 2026.

=== 2022 ===
In the second week of the 2022 finals series, Niukore scored two tries for Parramatta in a 40-4 victory over Canberra. Niukore played 19 games for Parramatta in the 2022 NRL season including the club's Grand Final loss to Penrith.

=== 2023 ===
In round 5 of the 2023 NRL season, Niukore scored a try and was later sin binned during New Zealand's 32-30 comeback victory against Cronulla. Niukore played 22 games for the New Zealand Warriors in the 2023 NRL season as the club finished 4th on the table and qualified for the finals. He played in all three finals games as the club reached the preliminary final before being defeated by Brisbane.

=== 2024 ===
He made 14 appearances for the New Zealand Warriors in the 2024 NRL season which saw the club finish 13th on the table.

=== 2025 ===
He played every game for New Zealand in the 2025 NRL season as the club finished 6th on the table and qualified for the finals. They were eliminated by Penrith in the first week of the finals.

=== 2026 ===
On 13 April 2026, the Knights announced that they had signed Niukore on a three year deal.

== Statistics ==
Year	Team	Games	Tries	Pts
2018	Parramatta Eels	14		
2019	Parramatta Eels	25	3	12
2020	Parramatta Eels	17	1	4
2021	Parramatta Eels	21	2	8
2022	Parramatta Eels	19	3	12
2023	New Zealand Warriors	22	3	12
2024	New Zealand Warriors	14	2	8
2025	New Zealand Warriors	25	4	16
2026	New Zealand Warriors	3		
2027	New Zealand Warriors			
	Totals	161	18	72

*Denotes season competing
