= Mitchell Barnett =

Australia international rugby league footballer

Mitch Barnett
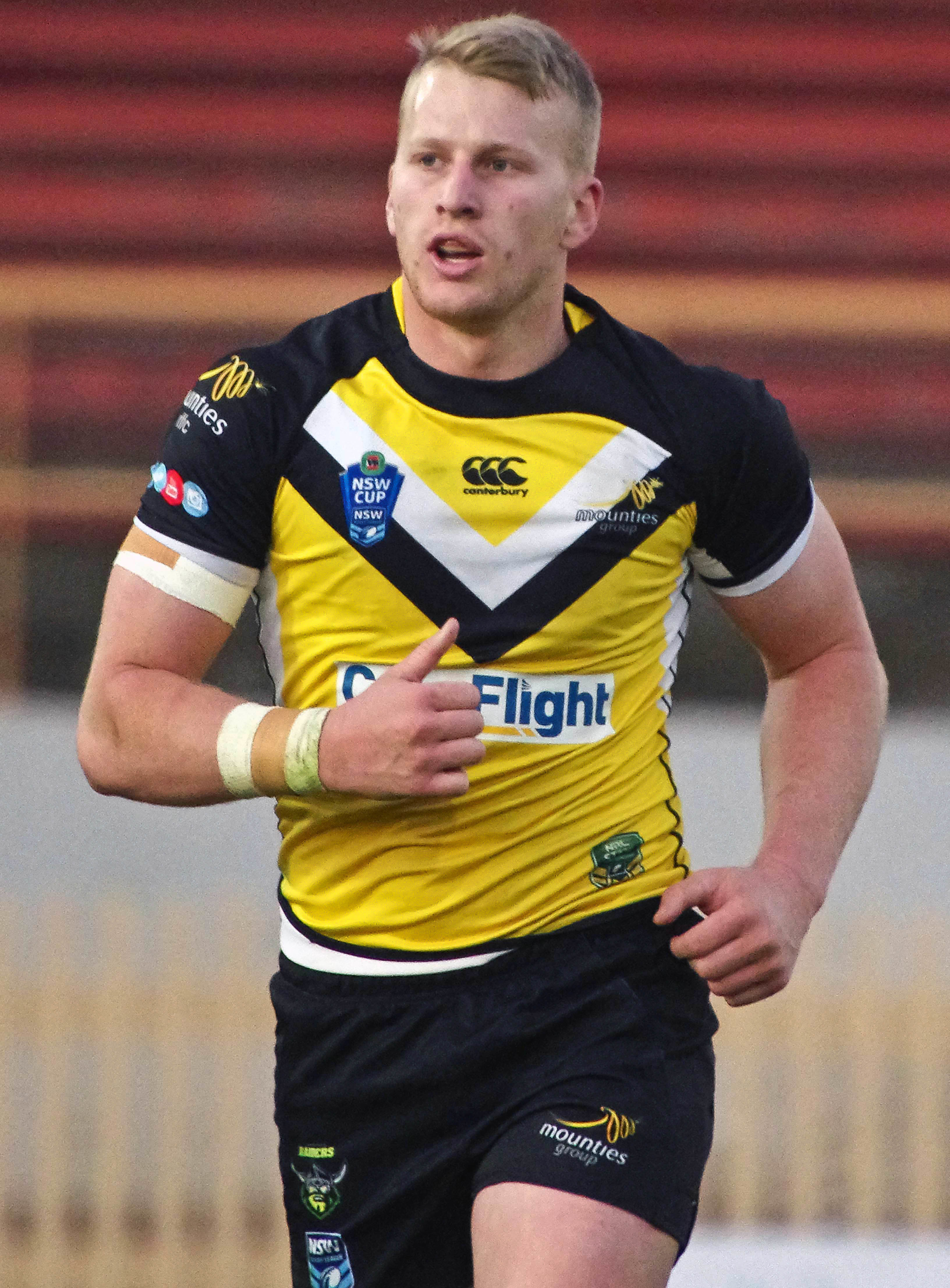

Personal information
- Full name: Mitchell Barnett
- Born: 15 April 1994 (age 32) Taree, New South Wales, Australia
- Height: 187 cm (6 ft 2 in)
- Weight: 104 kg (16 st 5 lb)

Playing information
- Position: Second-row, Lock, Prop
Club
Years	Team	Pld	T	G	FG	P
2015	Canberra Raiders	2	0	0	0	0
2016–22	Newcastle Knights	126	21	16	0	116
2023–26	New Zealand Warriors	66	7	0	0	28
2027–	Brisbane Broncos	0	0	0	0	0
	Total	194	28	16	0	144
Representative
Years	Team	Pld	T	G	FG	P
2015–16	NSW Residents	2	2	0	0	8
2024–26	New South Wales	5	1	0	0	4
2024	Australia	3	0	0	0	0
- Source: As of 31 October 2026

Mitchell Barnett (born 15 April 1994) is an Australian professional rugby league footballer who plays as a prop or second-row forward for the Brisbane Broncos in the National Rugby League (NRL).

He previously played for the New Zealand Warriors, Canberra Raiders and Newcastle Knights in the National Rugby League.

== Background ==
Barnett was born in Taree, New South Wales, Australia.

He started his junior rugby league career with Wingham Tigers Junior Rugby League in 1999, and remained with Wingham JRL until the end of under-16s in 2011, when he was signed by the Newcastle Knights.

== Playing career ==
=== Early career ===
After playing in the lower grades at the Newcastle Knights, Barnett joined the Canberra Raiders.

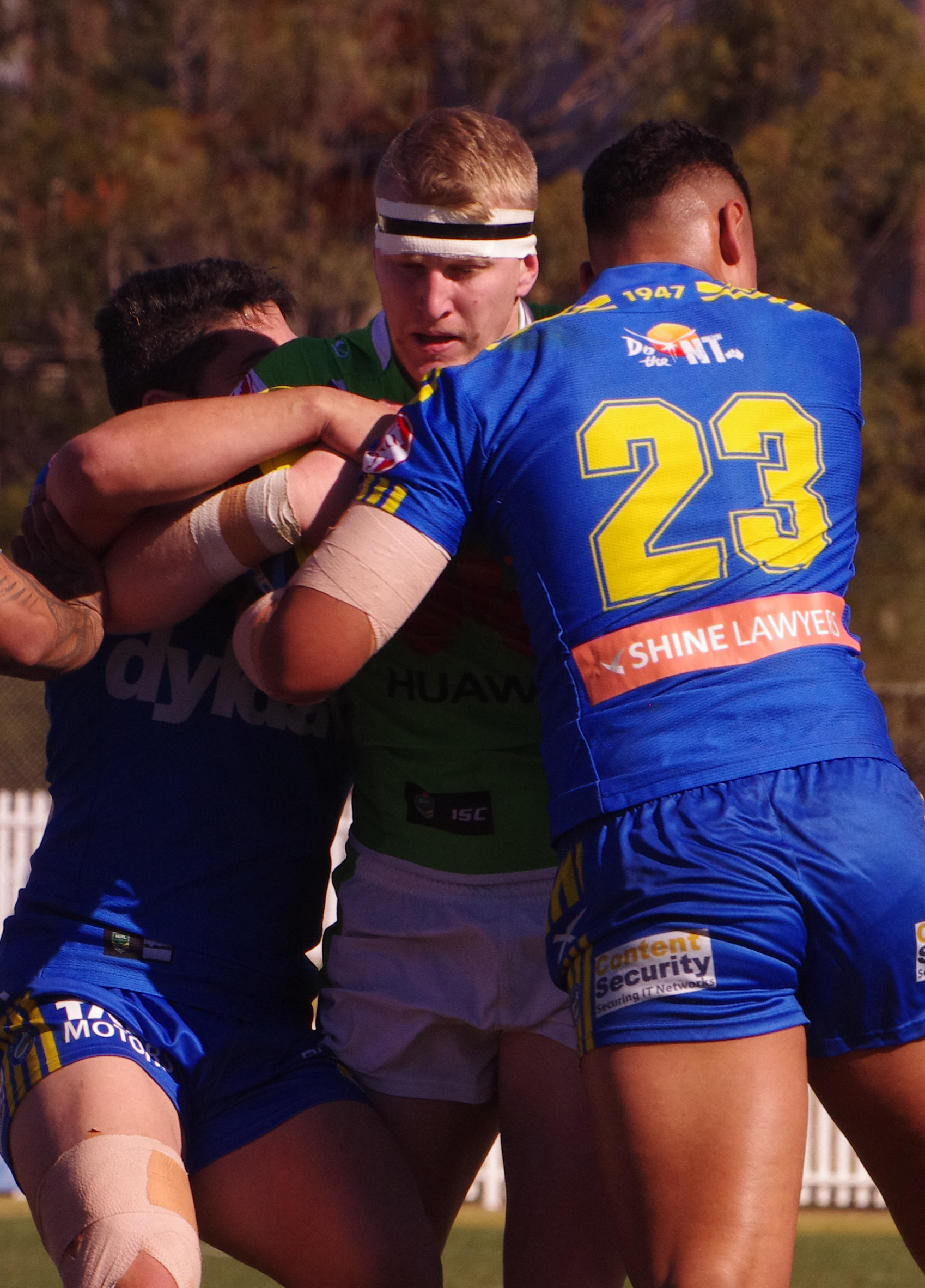
Barnett playing for the Canberra Raiders NYC side in 2014

In 2013 and 2014, he played for Canberra's NYC team.

=== 2015 ===
In 2015, Barnett graduated to Canberra's New South Wales Cup team, Mount Pritchard Mounties. On 10 April, he re-signed with Canberra on a two-year contract. On 3 May, he played for the New South Wales Residents against the Queensland Residents.

In round 22 of the 2015 NRL season, he made his NRL debut for Canberra against the Wests Tigers. On 27 September, he won the 2015 New South Wales Cup Player of the Year award and was named at second-row in the 2015 New South Wales Cup Team of the Year. In November, after Barnett's management discovered his new Canberra contract for the next two seasons hadn't been lodged with the NRL, he opted to instead attempt to sign a more lucrative deal with the Gold Coast Titans. However, after Canberra threatened legal action, the signed contract was discovered and lodged, Barnett returning to Canberra to honour the deal.

=== 2016 ===
On 8 May, Barnett played for the New South Wales Residents against the Queensland Residents for a second year in a row.

On 8 June, he re-joined the Newcastle Knights effective immediately on a contract until the end of 2017, after being released from the final two years of his Canberra Raiders contract. He made his Newcastle debut in round 14 against the New Zealand Warriors. He played nine games for Newcastle in his first season at the club as they finished bottom of the table.

=== 2017 ===
In March, Barnett re-signed with the Newcastle club on a three-year contract until the end of 2020. He made a total of 22 appearances and scored four tries for Newcastle as the club finished last on the table.

=== 2018 ===
Barnett played 23 games for Newcastle in the 2018 NRL season as the club finished 11th on the table.

=== 2019 ===
In round 11 against the Sydney Roosters, Barnett kicked two goals, with one from the sideline, after regular kicker Kalyn Ponga went off the field with an injury. In December, Barnett re-signed with the Newcastle club on a three-year contract until the end of 2023.

=== 2020 ===
Barnett played 13 games for Newcastle in the 2020 NRL season. He played in Newcastle's first finals game since 2013 which was a 46–20 loss against South Sydney in the elimination final.

=== 2021 ===
Barnett played 24 games for Newcastle in the 2021 NRL season including the club's elimination finals loss against Parramatta.

=== 2022 ===
In round 3 of the 2022 NRL season, Barnett was sent off for using a raised elbow on opponent Chris Smith during Newcastle's 38–20 loss against Penrith, and was subsequently referred to the NRL Judiciary for an ungraded dangerous contact charge. Barnett had pleaded guilty and claimed the contact was careless, however, it was found to be reckless in nature, with a six match suspension handed down in relation to the incident.

In April, Barnett signed a three-year contract with the New Zealand Warriors starting in 2023, after gaining a release from the final year of his Knights contract.

=== 2023 ===
In round 19 of the 2023 NRL season, Barnett scored two tries for New Zealand in their 46–10 victory over Parramatta. Barnett played 15 games for the New Zealand Warriors in the 2023 NRL season as the club finished 4th on the table and qualified for the finals. Barnett played in all three finals games as the club reached the preliminary final stage before being knocked out by Brisbane.

=== 2024 ===
Barnett was selected to play off the bench for New South Wales for game three of the 2024 State of Origin series. New South Wales would win the match 14–4 in Brisbane to claim the shield for the first time since 2021.

=== 2025 ===
In May, Barnett was selected to play for New South Wales in game one of the 2025 State of Origin series. On 2 June, Barnett was ruled out for the rest of the season after suffering an ACL injury during the New Zealand Warriors' round 13 win against South Sydney.

=== 2026 ===
On 24 February 2026, the New Zealand Warriors confirmed that Barnett would depart the club at the end of the season and would return home to Australia. On 12 March, it was reported Barnett had signed for the Brisbane Broncos on a two-year deal commencing in 2027. On 27 March, Barnett suffered a broken thumb in a 32–14 defeat against the Wests Tigers. On 16 April Brisbane officially announced that Barnett had signed a three-year deal with the club starting in 2027.

== Statistics ==
Year	Team	Games	Tries	Goals	Pts
2015	Canberra Raiders	2			
2016	Newcastle Knights	9	2		8
2017	Newcastle Knights	22	4		16
2018	Newcastle Knights	23	2		8
2019	Newcastle Knights	21	7	3	34
2020	Newcastle Knights	13	1		4
2021	Newcastle Knights	24	4	13	42
2022	Newcastle Knights	14	2		8
2023	New Zealand Warriors	15	2		8
2024	New Zealand Warriors	23	4		
2025	New Zealand Warriors	11			
2026	New Zealand Warriors	17	1		4
2027	Brisbane Broncos				
	Totals	194	28	16	144

*denotes season competing
