= 1996 Auckland Warriors season =

- ARL rank: 11th
- 1996 record: Wins: 10; draws: 0; losses: 11
- Points scored: For: 412; against: 427

Team information
- CEO: Ian Robson
- Coach: John Monie
- Captains: Greg Alexander; Denis Betts
- Stadium: Ericsson Stadium
- Avg. attendance: 20,126

Top scorers
- Tries: John Kirwan (10)
- Goals: Gene Ngamu (50)
- Points: Gene Ngamu (120)
| ← 1995 | 1997 → |

The Auckland Warriors 1996 season was the Auckland Warriors 2nd season in first-grade. The club competed in Australasia's Australian Rugby League competition. The coach of the team was John Monie while Greg Alexander was the club's captain.

== Milestones ==
- 29 July - Round 18 - Gene Ngamu scores 28 points (3 tries, 8 goals) in the defeat of the North Queensland Cowboys, setting the club's point scoring record.

== Jersey and sponsors ==

The Warriors retained the same jersey design as in 1995. The official jersey supplier were Lenco. The Jersey was blue with a Green, Red and White "V". Only one jersey was used for both home and away games. The main sponsor was DB Bitter. Asics, Coca-Cola and Mitsubishi also had sponsorship deals.

== Super League ==
As the Auckland Warriors had, along with seven other clubs, signed with News Limited they did not originally intend to compete in the Australian Rugby League's Optus Cup in 1996. Instead Super League was scheduled to start on 1 March 1996.

Legal proceedings had been ongoing between the ARL and News Ltd since 1995 and on 23 February 1996 Justice James Burchett ruled the new Super League competition to be illegal. As a result, the eight Super League clubs were obliged to compete in the Optus Cup in 1996. However the competition, which was originally planned to kick off on 1 March was delayed and commenced on 22 March.

As a result of the court action the Warriors were not invited to participate in the ARL's 1996 Rugby League World Sevens but many of their players instead took part in Super League's 1996 World Nines, which were won by New Zealand.

All Super League clubs apart from the Warriors forfeited Round One of the Optus Cup. The Warriors board instead directed reserve grade coach Frank Endacott to organise two teams of un-affiliated players to fly to Brisbane. Endacott did so, assembling teams largely made up of the Otahuhu Leopards and Ellerslie Eagles senior sides, and the Warriors first and reserve grade sides were awarded a win each via forfeit as Brisbane refused to play.

Auckland Warriors players were again ineligible for the New South Wales and Queensland State of Origin sides and the Australian Kangaroos due to the Warriors Super League stance.

In October 1996 New Limited won an appeal and Super League was allowed to go ahead in 1997.

== Fixtures ==
The Warriors used Ericsson Stadium as their home ground in 1996, their only home ground since they entered the competition in 1995.

=== Trial Matches ===
| Date | Round | Opponent | Venue | Result | Score | Tries | Goals | Attendance | Report |
|---|---|---|---|---|---|---|---|---|---|
| February | Match 1 | Cronulla Sharks | Ericsson Stadium, Auckland | Loss | 24 - 38 | | | | |

=== Regular season ===
| Date | Round | Opponent | Venue | Result | Score | Tries | Goals | Attendance | Report |
|---|---|---|---|---|---|---|---|---|---|
| | Round 1 | Brisbane Broncos | | Win* | | | | | |
| 31 March | Round 2 | Illawarra Steelers | Ericsson Stadium, Auckland | Win | 18 - 10 | T.Ropati (2), Blackmore | Alexander (2), Hill (1) | 17,246 | |
| 4 April | Round 3 | Western Suburbs Magpies | Campbelltown Stadium, Sydney | Loss | 8 - 22 | J.Vagana | Alexander (1), Hill (1) | 10,088 | |
| 1 April | Round 4 | North Sydney Bears | Ericsson Stadium, Auckland | Win | 12 - 8 | Jones | Hill (2), Alexander (1), Ellis (1) | 22,500 | |
| 7 April | Round 5 | Manly-Warringah Sea Eagles | Brookvale Oval, Sydney | Loss | 10 - 22 | Blake, Ngamu | Ngamu (1) | 18,588 | |
| 16 April | Round 6 | Illawarra Steelers | Steelers Stadium, Wollongong | Win | 30 - 20 | Alexander, Blake, Ellis, Jones, Tatupu | Ngamu (3), Hill (2) | 8,055 | |
| 23 April | Round 7 | Parramatta Eels | Ericsson Stadium, Auckland | Win | 28 - 4 | Kirwan (2), Alexander, Hoppe, Horo | Ngamu (3), Hill (1) | 23,432 | |
| 30 April | Round 8 | Sydney City Roosters | SFS, Sydney | Loss | 16 - 28 | Blackmore, Hoppe, T.Ropati | Ngamu (1), Hill (1) | 13,471 | |
| 7 May | Round 9 | Newcastle Knights | Ericsson Stadium, Auckland | Loss | 18 - 22 | Kirwan (2), Betts | Ngamu (1), Ellis (1) | 17,000 | |
| 14 May | Round 10 | Cronulla Sharks | Ericsson Stadium, Auckland | Loss | 24 - 28 | Hoppe, Kearney, Kirwan, Ngamu | Ngamu (4) | 22,810 | |
| 4 June | Round 11 | Sydney Tigers | Lancaster Park, Christchurch | Loss | 22 - 34 | Blackmore, Ellis, Kirwan, T.Ropati | Ngamu (2), Ellis (1) | 10,000 | |
| 18 June | Round 12 | Penrith Panthers | Penrith Park, Sydney | Win | 26 - 16 | Ellis (2), Hoppe, Horo, Kirwan | Ngamu (3) | 6,981 | |
| 25 June | Round 13 | Western Suburbs Magpies | Ericsson Stadium, Auckland | Win | 32 - 16 | Jones (2), Alexander, Eru, Hoppe, Kirwan | Ngamu (4) | 17,500 | |
| 1 July | Round 14 | South Sydney Rabbitohs | Ericsson Stadium, Auckland | Win | 24 - 10 | Eru (2), Jones, Kirwan | Ngamu (4) | 20,000 | |
| 9 July | Round 15 | Gold Coast Chargers | Carrara Stadium, Gold Coast | Win | 28 - 14 | Ellis, Henare, Horo, Kearney, Swann | Ngamu (4) | 11,870 | |
| 16 July | Round 16 | Western Reds | WACA Ground, Perth | Loss | 12 - 32 | Ellis, Swann | Ngamu (2) | 12,760 | |
| 23 July | Round 17 | South Queensland Crushers | Ericsson Stadium, Auckland | Win | 16 - 12 | Blackmore, Swann | Ngamu (3), Ellis (1) | 17,000 | |
| 29 July | Round 18 | North Queensland Cowboys | Ericsson Stadium, Auckland | Win | 52 - 6 | Ngamu (3), Betts, Blake, Hoppe, Horo, Jones, Kirwan | Ngamu (8) | 14,600 | |
| 6 August | Round 19 | St George Dragons | Kogarah Oval, Sydney | Loss | 6 - 35 | Guttenbeil | Ngamu (1) | 14,256 | |
| 11 August | Round 20 | Canterbury Bulldogs | Ericsson Stadium, Auckland | Win | 18 - 12 | Betts, Blackmore, Ropati | Ngamu (3) | 23,300 | |
| 18 August | Round 21 | Canberra Raiders | Bruce Stadium, Canberra | Loss | 6 - 30 | Blackmore | Ngamu (1) | 14,528 | |
| 27 August | Round 22 | Brisbane Broncos | Ericsson Stadium, Auckland | Loss | 6 - 38 | Hoppe | Ngamu (1) | 26,000 | |

*Brisbane forfeited Round One. The Warriors had sent a team to Brisbane consisting of players un-signed to Super League.

== Ladder ==
| | Team | Pld | W | D | L | PF | PA | PD | Pts |
|---|---|---|---|---|---|---|---|---|---|
| 1 | Manly-Warringah | 22 | 18 | 0 | 4 | 549 | 191 | +358 | 36 |
| 2 | Brisbane | 21 | 17 | 0 | 4 | 607 | 263 | +344 | 34 |
| 3 | North Sydney | 22 | 15 | 2 | 5 | 598 | 325 | +273 | 32 |
| 4 | Sydney City | 22 | 15 | 1 | 6 | 521 | 321 | +200 | 31 |
| 5 | Cronulla-Sutherland | 21 | 14 | 2 | 5 | 399 | 268 | +131 | 30 |
| 6 | Canberra | 21 | 13 | 1 | 7 | 538 | 384 | +154 | 27 |
| 7 | St. George | 21 | 12 | 1 | 8 | 443 | 360 | +83 | 27 |
| 8 | Western Suburbs | 22 | 12 | 1 | 9 | 394 | 434 | −40 | 25 |
| 9 | Newcastle | 21 | 10 | 1 | 10 | 416 | 388 | +28 | 23 |
| 10 | Canterbury | 21 | 11 | 0 | 10 | 375 | 378 | −3 | 22 |
| 11 | Auckland | 21 | 10 | 0 | 11 | 412 | 427 | −15 | 22 |
| 12 | Balmain | 22 | 11 | 0 | 11 | 319 | 459 | −140 | 22 |
| 13 | Parramatta | 21 | 9 | 1 | 11 | 404 | 415 | −11 | 21 |
| 14 | Illawarra | 22 | 8 | 0 | 14 | 403 | 444 | −41 | 16 |
| 15 | Penrith | 21 | 7 | 1 | 13 | 363 | 464 | −101 | 15 |
| 16 | Western Reds | 21 | 6 | 1 | 14 | 313 | 420 | −107 | 13 |
| 17 | North Queensland | 21 | 6 | 0 | 15 | 288 | 643 | −355 | 12 |
| 18 | Gold Coast | 22 | 5 | 1 | 16 | 359 | 521 | −162 | 11 |
| 19 | South Sydney | 22 | 5 | 1 | 16 | 314 | 634 | −320 | 11 |
| 20 | South Queensland | 21 | 3 | 0 | 18 | 220 | 496 | −276 | 8 |

== Squad ==
The Warriors used twenty eight players in 1996, including nine who made their first grade debuts.

| No. | Name | Nationality | Position | Warriors debut | App | T | G | FG | Pts |
|---|---|---|---|---|---|---|---|---|---|
| 2 | Phil Blake | (Australia) | FB / HK | 10 March 1995 | 18 | 3 | 0 | 0 | 12 |
| 3 | Sean Hoppe | (New Zealand) | WG | 10 March 1995 | 20 | 7 | 0 | 0 | 28 |
| 6 | Gene Ngamu | (New Zealand) | FE | 10 March 1995 | 20 | 5 | 50 | 0 | 120 |
| 7 | Greg Alexander | (Australia) | FB / FE / HB | 10 March 1995 | 16 | 3 | 4 | 0 | 20 |
| 8 | Gavin Hill | (New Zealand) | PR | 10 March 1995 | 7 | 0 | 8 | 0 | 16 |
| 10 | Hitro Okesene | (New Zealand) | PR / HK | 10 March 1995 | 4 | 0 | 0 | 0 | 0 |
| 11 | Stephen Kearney | (New Zealand) | SR | 10 March 1995 | 21 | 2 | 0 | 0 | 8 |
| 12 | Tony Tatupu | (New Zealand) / (Samoa) | SR | 10 March 1995 | 11 | 1 | 0 | 0 | 4 |
| 13 | Tony Tuimavave | (New Zealand) / (Samoa) | PR / LK | 10 March 1995 | 5 | 0 | 0 | 0 | 0 |
| 15 | Tea Ropati | (New Zealand) / (Samoa) | CE / FE | 10 March 1995 | 20 | 5 | 0 | 0 | 20 |
| 18 | Joe Vagana | (New Zealand) / (Samoa) | PR | 18 March 1995 | 20 | 1 | 0 | 0 | 4 |
| 19 | Syd Eru | (New Zealand) | HK | 28 March 1995 | 11 | 3 | 0 | 0 | 12 |
| 22 | John Kirwan | (New Zealand) | WG | 16 April 1995 | 19 | 10 | 0 | 0 | 40 |
| 23 | Andy Platt | (England) | PR | 23 April 1995 | 21 | 0 | 0 | 0 | 0 |
| 24 | Stacey Jones | (New Zealand) | HB | 23 April 1995 | 21 | 6 | 0 | 0 | 24 |
| 26 | Richie Blackmore | (New Zealand) | CE | 14 May 1995 | 17 | 6 | 0 | 0 | 24 |
| 28 | Denis Betts | (England) | SR | 4 June 1995 | 17 | 3 | 0 | 0 | 12 |
| 29 | Marc Ellis | (New Zealand) | FB / WG | 31 March 1996 | 18 | 6 | 4 | 0 | 32 |
| 30 | Mark Horo | (New Zealand) | PR / SR | 31 March 1996 | 21 | 4 | 0 | 0 | 16 |
| 31 | Mark Carter | (New Zealand) | SR | 31 March 1996 | 8 | 0 | 0 | 0 | 0 |
| 32 | Nigel Vagana | (New Zealand) / (Samoa) | CE | 4 April 1996 | 1 | 0 | 0 | 0 | 0 |
| 33 | Awen Guttenbeil | (New Zealand) / (Tonga) | SR | 14 April 1996 | 14 | 1 | 0 | 0 | 4 |
| 34 | Doc Murray | (New Zealand) | FB | 19 April 1996 | 1 | 0 | 0 | 0 | 0 |
| 35 | Iva Ropati | (New Zealand) | CE | 19 April 1996 | 2 | 0 | 0 | 0 | 0 |
| 36 | Anthony Swann | (New Zealand) / (Samoa) | CE | 23 June 1996 | 9 | 3 | 0 | 0 | 12 |
| 37 | Brady Malam | (New Zealand) | PR | 23 June 1996 | 8 | 0 | 0 | 0 | 0 |
| 38 | Bryan Henare | (New Zealand) | SR | 23 July 1996 | 3 | 1 | 0 | 0 | 4 |
| 39 | Aaron Lester | (New Zealand) | HK | 28 July 1996 | 3 | 0 | 0 | 0 | 0 |

== Staff ==
- Chairman: Peter McLeod
- Chief Executive Officer: Ian Robson
- Football Manager: Laurie Stubbing

=== Coaching staff ===
- Head coach: John Monie
- Reserve Grade Coach: Frank Endacott
- Development Officer: John Ackland

== Transfers ==
=== Gains ===
| Player | Previous club | Notes |
|---|---|---|
| Marc Ellis | Otago Rugby Football Union | |
| Mark Horo | Western Suburbs Magpies | |
| Mark Carter | Auckland Rugby Football Union | |
| Awen Guttenbeil | Manly Sea Eagles | |
| Iva Ropati | Parramatta Eels | |

=== Losses ===
| Player | Club | Notes |
|---|---|---|
| Dean Bell | Retired | |
| Manoa Thompson | Released | |
| Whetu Taewa | North Queensland Cowboys | |
| Duane Mann | Released | |
| Se'e Solomona | North Queensland Cowboys | |
| Jason Mackie | Released | |
| Martin Moana | Halifax Blue Sox | |
| Willie Poching | North Queensland Cowboys | |
| Logan Edwards | Released | |
| Mike Dorreen | Sydney Tigers | |
| Frano Botica | Llanelli RFC | |

== Other teams ==
The Warriors participated in the ARL's Reserve grade competition that mirrored the senior draw. The Reserve grade side again made the finals, finishing third. Unlike in 1995, the Warriors did not field a Colts side in the Lion Red Cup.

In the Club Championship the Warriors finished fifth overall.

In the Reserve Grade Finals the Warriors first bet Sydney City 19–18 in the Quarterfinals. In the Semifinals they defeated Brisbane 18-12 to make the Grand Final. However, in the Grand Final the Warriors went down 14-12 to the Cronulla Sharks, the second year in a row that a Warriors team had lost a Grand Final. The cost of the finals campaign to the club was estimated at between $70,000 and $75,000.

== Awards ==
Stephen Kearney won the club's Player of the Year award.
