= John Ah Kuoi =

Samoa international rugby union player

- Born: John Joseph Ah Kuoi; 14 July 1957 (age 69) Samoa
- Height: 180 cm (5 ft 11 in)
- Weight: 70 kg (154 lb)
- Notable relative(s): John Kirwan (brother-in-law); Niko Kirwan (nephew)

Rugby union career
- Position: Centre
Amateur team(s)
Years	Team	Apps	(Points)
- Marist
Senior career
Years	Team	Apps	(Points)
1985–1986	Auckland B		
1987	Auckland		
1996	Central Vikings		
International career
Years	Team	Apps	(Points)
1987–1990	Samoa	6	(11)

Tuaopepe John Joseph Ah Kuoi (born 14 July 1957) is a former Samoan rugby union player. He played as a centre.

== Career ==
John Ah Kuoi is from a prominent Samoan family, with Chinese heritage in addition. He moved to Auckland as a 12-year-old for his schooling, but kept his ties with Samoa, representing the country in 12 rugby tests in the 1980s. He played for Auckland in the NPC in the 1980s. His first cap for Samoa was for a match against Fiji, at Suva, on 22 August 1987 and his last cap was against Tonga, at Tokyo, on 11 April 1990.

== Personal life ==
On leaving school, he gained a private pilot licence, but a career in aviation did not materialise. He married and became an insurance salesman. The couple moved to Italy for a year, where John played rugby with his brother-in-law, All Black John Kirwan.

After returning to New Zealand, John worked in a business selling uniforms, soon branching out with his own sports uniform business. Together with his wife Sue, he ran this business for 19 years. In 2009, he returned to his first job as insurance advisor, this time with the Maurice Trapp Group.

John plays golf, and has continued rugby coaching for many years.
