= John Kirwan (rugby) =

New Zealand rugby footballer and coach

Sir John Kirwan KNZM MBE
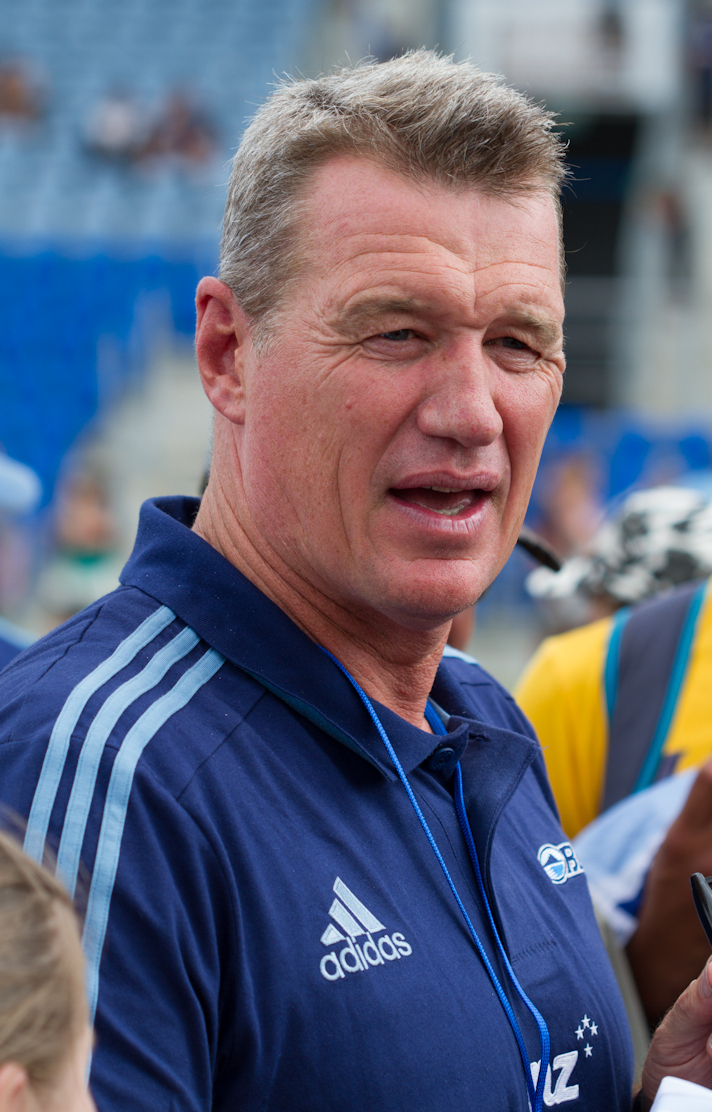
- Born: John James Patrick Kirwan; 16 December 1964 (age 61) Auckland, New Zealand
- Height: 1.92 m (6 ft 4 in)
- Weight: 92 kg (14 st 7 lb)
- School: De La Salle College, Māngere East
- Notable relative(s): Jack Kirwan (grandfather); Niko Kirwan (son); John Ah Kuoi (brother-in-law)

Rugby union career
- Position: Wing
Senior career
Years	Team	Apps	(Points)
1983–94	Marist		
1985–89	Treviso	60	(184)
1989–90	Thiene		
1997–99	NEC		
Provincial / State sides
Years	Team	Apps	(Points)
1983–94	Auckland	142	
International career
Years	Team	Apps	(Points)
1984–94	New Zealand	63	(143)
Coaching career
- Years: Team
- 1999–2001: NEC
- 2001: Blues (assistant)
- 2001–02: Italy (assistant)
- 2002–05: Italy
- 2007–11: Japan
- 2012: Barbarians
- 2013–15: Blues
- Correct as of 18 November 2013
- Rugby league career

Playing information
- Position: Wing
Club
Years	Team	Pld	T	G	FG	P
1995–96	Auckland Warriors	35	13	0	0	52

Sir John James Patrick Kirwan KNZM MBE (born 16 December 1964) is a New Zealand mental health advocate, former rugby union and rugby league footballer, and former rugby union coach.

A wing, he played for Auckland in the 1980s and 1990s, when they dominated New Zealand rugby. He played in 63 tests for New Zealand, and scored 35 tries, making him one of the highest try scorers in international rugby union history. He was part of the New Zealand team that won the first Rugby World Cup in 1987. He also played rugby league for the Auckland Warriors in their first two seasons in 1995 and 1996.

After retiring, he moved into coaching, and was the head coach of Japanese club NEC, the Italy and Japan national teams, and the Blues in Super Rugby, until he stepped down in 2015.

He has written two books on the subject of mental health, has spoken openly about his battles with depression and been honoured for his services to mental health.

== Early life and family ==
Kirwan was born in Auckland on 16 December 1964, the son of Patrick and Patricia Madeline Kirwan. He was educated at De La Salle College in Auckland.

His paternal grandfather, Jack Kirwan, was a wing three-quarter/five-eighths originally from Reefton who played for the New Zealand rugby league team on 28 occasions.

== Playing career ==
=== Rugby union ===
Kirwan played for Marist Brothers Old Boys RFC and Auckland domestically, winning 142 caps with the latter during an era when the side dominated the NPC and Ranfurly Shield.

From 1985 to 1989 he also played in Italy, with Benetton Treviso, where he won the Italian championship in 1989. Also in the Treviso team was the All Black Craig Green, Kirwan's teammate in the 1987 World Cup won by New Zealand.

After his spell in rugby league, he finished his rugby union playing career with NEC in Japan from 1997 to 1999.

==== International ====
Kirwan played 63 test matches for New Zealand from 1984 until 1994. Kirwan played a major role in the All Blacks' 23-test unbeaten run from 1987 to 1990, including winning the 1987 World Cup. He scored 10 tries in five tests against Wales and Australia during 1988. In all he scored 35 test tries for New Zealand. He also scored 67 tries in all appearances with the All Blacks (including non test matches) which is still the national record. His total of 199 first class tries remains a New Zealand record.

Kirwan was selected as one of the "Five players of the year" for the 1985,1986, 1987 and 1988 seasons, in the Rugby Almanack of New Zealand.

In 1986 Kirwan and David Kirk were the only All Blacks not to join the 'rebel' New Zealand Cavaliers team that travelled to apartheid-era South Africa after a New Zealand court held that the All Blacks' playing in that country would be inconsistent with their mission of promoting rugby. As a result, he and Kirk were the only ones not barred from playing with the All Blacks after the tour.

=== Rugby league ===
At age 30 Kirwan signed for the newly formed rugby league club Auckland Warriors for the 1995 ARL season, with a mutual option for 1996. Playing on the wing, Kirwan was the Warriors' top try scorer in the 1996 season. He was a staunch opponent of the ARL during the Super League war.

== Coaching career ==
Kirwan coached NEC Green Rockets in Japan, and in 2001 became an assistant coach with the Auckland Blues.

In 2002, he moved to Italy to become the coach of the Italy national team, which under his guidance recorded two victories over Wales in 2003 and Scotland in 2004. After a winless 2005 Six Nations campaign, he was dismissed on 8 April 2005. He continued to work as a consultant with NEC.

At the start of 2007 he was appointed the coach of the Japan national rugby union team. Kirwan said: "The level of rugby has improved greatly in Japan in the last ten years and they did well at the last World Cup. But their recent performances at national level have [not been good]. I want to find that 'Samurai Spirit' that all the players can identify with. And then that style of rugby can start to spread downwards throughout the country." At the 2007 Rugby World Cup, Japan drew 12–12 with Canada, breaking a 16-year, 13-match losing streak at World Cups. Kirwan remained head coach of Japan through the 2011 Rugby World Cup, when they again drew with Canada, but lost to New Zealand, France and Tonga.

In July 2012, Kirwan was announced as the new coach of the Blues. In the 2013 and 2014 seasons, the Blues finished in 10th place. After re-applying for the role for 2016 and beyond, he was forced to step down following just three wins - an all-time franchise low - in the 2015 season. In 2018 he stated that he is not likely to coach again.

== Health ==
Kirwan has openly spoken of his battle with depression, and is actively involved in mental health and depression awareness campaigns in New Zealand. He has written about his depression in the books All Blacks Don't Cry and Stand by Me.

He established the Sir John Kirwan Foundation to help young people understand mental health. In 2020, he launched a mental wellbeing app called Mentemia.

== Personal life ==
Kirwan is married to Fiorella, and they have three children, including Niko, who has played football for the All Whites, New Zealand's national team, Kirwan speaks fluent Italian and good Japanese, having lived in Italy and Japan.

In 2016, Kirwan's DNA heritage was investigated for a television programme, in which links to the Irish-American Kennedy family and Scottish mountaineer Alexander Kellas were shown.

== Honours and awards ==
In the 1989 New Year Honours, Kirwan was appointed a Member of the Order of the British Empire, for services to rugby.

In the 2007 Queen's Birthday Honours, Kirwan was appointed an Officer of the New Zealand Order of Merit, for services to mental health. In the 2012 Queen's Birthday and Diamond Jubilee Honours, he was promoted to Knight Companion of the New Zealand Order of Merit, for services to mental health and rugby.

Also in 2012, Kirwan was inducted into the New Zealand Sports Hall of Fame.

== Bibliography ==
- The outdoors cookbook: John Kirwan & Annabel Langbein's favourite barbecue and grill recipes (1989) ISBN 0-908757-06-9
- Kirwan: running on instinct (1992) ISBN 1-86947-107-5
- Why I am: a bag full of wisdom to take on the road (c1999) ISBN 1-86953-440-9
- All Blacks Don’t Cry: A Story of Hope (2010) ISBN 978-0-14-320480-0

Sporting positions
Preceded by (New Zealand) Brad Johnstone	Italy National Rugby Union Coach; 2002–2005	Succeeded by (France) Pierre Berbizier
Preceded by (Japan) Osamu Ota (caretaker)	Japan national rugby union coach 2007–2011	Succeeded by (Australia) Eddie Jones
