= New Zealand Warriors =

Professional rugby league football club

Club information
- Full name: New Zealand Warriors Limited
- Nickname(s): The Warriors, The Wahs
- Short name: WAR
- Colours: Blue; Green; Red; White
- Founded: 1995 as Auckland Warriors
- Website: warriors.kiwi

Current details
- Ground: Mount Smart Stadium (25,000)
- CEO: Cameron George
- Chairman: Ken Reinsfield
- Coach: Andrew Webster (NRL) Ronald Griffiths (NRLW)
- Captain: Mitchell Barnett & James Fisher-Harris (NRL); Apii Nicholls (NRLW)
- Competition: NRL Men's Premiership
- 2026 season: 2nd

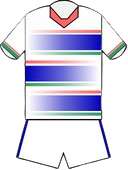
Home colours	Away colours
- Current season

Records
- Premierships: 0
- Runners-up: 2 (2002, 2011)
- Minor premierships: 1 (2002)
- NSW Cup: 1 (2025)
- NRL State Championship: 1 (2025)
- Wooden spoons: 0
- Most capped: 301 – Simon Mannering
- Highest try scorer: 152 – Manu Vatuvei
- Highest points scorer: 1,213 – Shaun Johnson

The New Zealand Warriors are a professional rugby league club based in Auckland, New Zealand that competes in the National Rugby League (NRL) premiership and is the League's only team from outside Australia. They were formed in 1995 as the Auckland Warriors, and are affectionately known as the Wahs. The Warriors are coached by Andrew Webster. Mitch Barnett and James Fisher Harris are the current co-captains. The Warriors are based at Mount Smart Stadium in the Auckland suburb of Penrose.

For the 1995 season the newly formed Auckland Warriors became the first club from outside Australia to be admitted to the Australian Rugby League's premiership when it expanded from 16 to 20 teams. As a result of the Super League war in the mid-1990s, Auckland left the ARL to compete in the Super League competition of 1997, before joining the re-unified NRL the following year. They re-branded themselves the New Zealand Warriors in 2001. The club has yet to win a premiership as of 2026. They have won one minor premiership (in 2002), and reached two grand finals (2002, 2011), reaching the finals eleven times.

== History ==
=== History of the bid ===
Rugby league in New Zealand was largely centred around Auckland since the establishment of the New Zealand Rugby League in 1909. Auckland produced the bulk of the New Zealand team for many years, and a number of these players were recruited to play professionally in either Australia or England.

In the 1970s and 1980s, the Auckland representative side consistently provided strong opposition to touring teams. An Auckland team was admitted into the mid-week ARL Amco Cup competition in 1978. In their first year they made the semi-finals, and were defeated by the overall competition winners, the Eastern Suburbs Roosters. They remained in the competition until the early 1980s. In 1987, an Auckland side toured Great Britain and claimed wins over powerhouse clubs Leeds and Wigan.

In 1988, serious investigation into an Auckland team entering the New South Wales Rugby League (NSWRL) commenced, encouraged mainly by Mount Albert, which at that time was one of the strongest rugby league clubs in the country. On 17 May 1992, it was announced that an Auckland-based club would enter the Australian Rugby League competition in 1995. This followed very good turnouts to a number of NSWRL matches played in Auckland. The new team was to be called the Auckland Warriors and would be run by the Auckland Rugby League. The original colours selected were blue, white, red and green. Blue and white are recognized as the traditional sporting colours of Auckland, while red and green were the colours of the Warriors' original sponsor, DB Bitter. The original logo was designed by Francis Allan, of Colenso.

=== Inaugural Season – 1995 ===
Position	Pld	Won	Drew	Lost	Bye	Points for	Points against	Points differential
10th (of 20)	22	13	0	9	–	544	493	+51

The coach of the new team would be former Parramatta and Wigan coach John Monie. A number of senior players were signed, such as Greg Alexander and Andy Platt. Captain Dean Bell was a high-performing signing. Former rugby union players such as John Kirwan and Marc Ellis were brought in, in later years.

The Warriors' first year in the Australian Rugby League was 1995. Their debut match was against the Brisbane Broncos on 10 March 1995 in front of 30,000 people at a newly refurbished Mount Smart Stadium. The Warriors led 22–10 at one point in the second half of the match, however Brisbane defeated the new club 25–22.

A home crowd attendance record of 32,174 was set at Mount Smart Stadium in Round 6 of the 1995 ARL season, a record that was not topped until Round 1 of the 2011 NRL season (albeit that match was played at Eden Park, not Mount Smart Stadium).

The Warriors were deducted two competition points for an interchange error. In a match against Western Suburbs, the Warriors used five interchange players instead of the allowed four. The Warriors won the match, 46–12. This error led to the club ultimately missing the finals by two competition points. The season saw the debut of future star, Stacey Jones, who scored a try on debut in a 40–4 rout of the Parramatta Eels in Sydney.

=== Second year blues – 1996 ===
Position	Pld	Won	Drew	Lost	Bye	Points for	Points against	Points differential
11th (of 20)	21	10	0	11	–	412	427	−15

The Australian Rugby League season 1996 could have been regarded as a better one for the Warriors. The Warriors found themselves siding with the Super League during the Super League War when the New Zealand Rugby League signed up to the rebel competition. They claimed their first 'victory' over the Brisbane Broncos in round one of the competition that year, after all Super League clubs agreed to boycott the first round of the competition in protest. The Warriors won the two points when they travelled to Brisbane with a squad of players that were unsigned to Super League, forcing the Broncos to forfeit the match.

With four rounds remaining the Warriors were in sixth place in the competition, seemingly headed for a finals berth. They proceeded to lose all four matches to tumble out of the finals.

=== Super League war – 1997 ===
Position	Pld	Won	Drew	Lost	Bye	Points for	Points against	Points differential
7th (of 10)	18	7	0	11	–	332	406	−74

The Warriors spent 1997 in the breakaway Super League Telstra Cup competition. Despite the reduced number of teams, they failed to make an impression on the competition. Monie was replaced by Frank Endacott as coach midway through the 1997 season. The only positive was the team's performance in the World Club Challenge. The Warriors defeated United Kingdom powerhouses Wigan and St Helens, as well as Warrington. The Warriors were knocked out in the semi-finals by eventual winners the Brisbane Broncos, going down 16–22.

=== Beginning of the NRL era – 1998 ===
Position	Pld	Won	Drew	Lost	Bye	Points for	Points against	Points differential
15th (of 20)	24	9	0	15	–	417	518	−101

The first season of the reformed competition was a year that saw few highlights for the club. It was readily apparent that the club needed a new approach and attitude. They were in a better position than the other two clubs that joined the competition in 1995.

=== Tainui era – 1999 ===
Position	Pld	Won	Drew	Lost	Bye	Points for	Points against	Points differential
11th (of 17)	24	10	0	14	–	538	498	+40

Former Kiwi Mark Graham took over as coach in 1999. The club was sold off to a consortium that included ex-Kiwi coach Graham Lowe and the Tainui tribe. The club again disappointed on field, but a mid season ultimatum saw a strong finish to the season, with the side winning five of their last six games. The signs appeared promising for the new millennium.

=== Financial collapse and reinvention – 2000 ===
Position	Pld	Won	Drew	Lost	Bye	Points for	Points against	Points differential
13th (of 14)	24	8	2	16	–	426	662	−236

In National Rugby League season 2000 the Warriors could only finish second last. This season included the Warriors' second largest ever loss in their history to date, 54–0 to St. George Illawarra in Wollongong. Alarmingly, the problems off-field overshadowed the on-field problems. The majority shareholders were under intense financial pressure, and the club's future was looking bleak at best. The key assets of the club were purchased by business tycoon Eric Watson. This did not include player contracts, and many players were released and had to fight to get the money they had been promised. Ultimately only 10 players from the 2000 season were retained.

The club was re-branded as the New Zealand Warriors, with new colours of black and grey – resembling the national sporting colours. The name 'New Zealand Warriors' had first been used by a 17-man Māori cultural group that visited and performed in Australia in 1862. New coach Daniel Anderson and CEO Mick Watson focused on signing unknown New Zealand talent. There were only six Australians in the 2001 squad, and only three foundation players – Monty Betham, Stacey Jones and Logan Swann.

=== First finals series – 2001 ===
Position	Pld	Won	Drew	Lost	Bye	Points for	Points against	Points differential
8th (of 14)	26	12	2	12	–	638	629	+9

In a season where the re-branded New Zealand Warriors were tipped to finish in second-last place behind the North Queensland Cowboys, the team surprised all, qualifying for their first ever finals appearance in the National Rugby League season 2001.

The Warriors were involved in Round 8 in one of the biggest near-comebacks in the history of the NRL. Down 24–8 to the Bulldogs with under six minutes remaining, the Warriors rattled off three tries in as many sets, only failing to win the match as Stacey Jones missed a conversion from in front of the posts in the final minute.

After a mid-season struggle, the Warriors upset the minor premiers Parramatta 29–18 at home, in what was a highlight match.

Then, with their season on the line, the team won four matches in a row, starting with impressive 34–8, 30–0, and 14–8 home victories over fellow finals-bound teams the Bulldogs, Cronulla, and the Sydney Roosters. The Warriors also scored 24 unanswered points in the final quarter to beat the Panthers 48–32. Their first finals appearance was sealed with a bruising 24–24 draw with the Melbourne Storm at Colonial Stadium, but the effects of this match were seen a week later, as the Warriors were beaten by 30–18 at home by the Cowboys, a win that saw the North Queenslanders avoiding the wooden spoon.

In their first-ever finals appearance, they were defeated by the Minor Premiers, the Parramatta Eels 56–12. The loss was at the time the largest in finals series history.

=== Minor Premiership and Grand Final – 2002 ===
Position	Pld	Won	Drew	Lost	Bye	Points for	Points against	Points differential
1st (of 15)	24	17	0	7	2	688	454	+234

The Warriors reached their zenith to date in the National Rugby League season 2002. They won the Minor Premiership, finishing in first place at the conclusion of the regular season after the Bulldogs lost 37 competition points late in the season due to severe salary cap breaches. The club played what stands as the first finals match to have been held outside Australia at Mount Smart Stadium in the first week of the Finals Series. The Warriors would defeat their bogey side the Canberra Raiders 36–20 after surviving an early scare.

For the Preliminary Final against the Cronulla Sharks at Stadium Australia the Warriors' sponsors, such as Vodafone New Zealand and Eric Watson, purchased 15,000 tickets and gave them away for free to anyone with a New Zealand passport. Reportedly, in the 45,000 crowd there were more Warriors supporters than Cronulla supporters – astonishing considering Cronulla are a Sydney-based club. The Warriors went on to win 16–10 with John Carlaw scoring a famous try after latching onto a pinpoint Stacey Jones grubber-kick.

The Grand Final against the Sydney Roosters was a tight match for the first hour. The Warriors trailed 2–6 at half time, but took a lead just after halftime when Jones scored a great grand final try – as he left defenders sprawling in his wake on a 40-metre run to the try line. The Roosters ran away with the match in the final 20 minutes after captain Brad Fittler was involved in a head clash with Warriors prop Richard Villasanti. The final score was 8–30.

=== Top-eight again – 2003 ===
Position	Pld	Won	Drew	Lost	Bye	Points for	Points against	Points differential
6th (of 15)	24	15	0	9	2	545	510	+35

2003 was another quite successful year for the Warriors.

After blowing an early 16–0 lead to lose 26–36 to the Newcastle Knights in Round 1, the Warriors embarked on a five-match winning streak to announce themselves as contenders for the season. However, the Warriors then struggled through the middle-stages of the season, squandering a 26–12 lead with eight minutes remaining to lose to the Parramatta Eels dramatically 28–26 at Parramatta Stadium. There was also an insipid 10–30 loss in Townsville to the North Queensland Cowboys. They played their first ever extra time match, defeating South Sydney 31–30, recovering from a 6–24 deficit.

The Warriors secured their playoff spot, ultimately finishing sixth on points differential, a dangerous position to finish, as the 6th-placed finishers had been eliminated after the first week of the playoffs in the past three seasons.

Their first finals match was against the Bulldogs at the Sydney Showground (now Giants Stadium). The Warriors turned on one of their finest performances ever, stunning the Bulldogs early to lead 16–4 at halftime, and after a Canterbury comeback tied the scores at 16-all, scoring five tries in 16 minutes to blow the Bulldogs away, eventually winning 48–22. Winger Francis Meli scored five tries, a finals record. This prompted Graham Lowe, a known critic of the Warriors to say that the Warriors would win the premiership. The next week a Stacey Jones field-goal in the dying minutes got the Warriors past a gallant Canberra Raiders 17–16. They however lost in the Preliminary Final to the Minor Premiers and eventual Premiers Penrith Panthers, 20–28. It was a disappointing loss for the Warriors, who did not lead at any point of the match, and blew their chance early in the second half to take their first lead, when Henry Fa'afili lost the ball with the line wide open.

=== Worst year yet – 2004 ===
Position	Pld	Won	Drew	Lost	Bye	Points for	Points against	Points differential
14th (of 15)	24	6	0	18	2	427	693	−266

Before the National Rugby League season 2004 started, there were predictions of the Warriors having a highly successful season. These were proved wrong, as the Warriors managed to only win six games to finish equal last, only escaping the wooden spoon by having a superior points differential to the South Sydney Rabbitohs. Coach Daniel Anderson resigned mid-season after an embarrassing 52-point loss to the Sydney Roosters. His assistant Tony Kemp was given the head coach position, and in his first game in charge the Warriors recorded an emotional 20–14 win over Canberra. A week later, the Warriors' first match in Christchurch since 1996 was a flop, as the Warriors were destroyed by the Wests Tigers 4–50. The season finished with an embarrassing six-game losing streak.

The management looked to rescue a poor year with some high-profile signings. Bulldogs captain Steve Price was signed, as was Kiwis captain Ruben Wiki, North Queensland half Nathan Fien and Roosters winger Todd Byrne.

=== Rebuilding begins – 2005 ===
Position	Pld	Won	Drew	Lost	Bye	Points for	Points against	Points differential
11th (of 15)	24	10	0	14	2	515	528	−13

2005 was an improvement over the horror scenes of 2004. The team remained competitive for all of their matches, and their largest loss was only 18 points. The team had a good chance to make the finals, however a four match losing streak late in the season removed those chances. The season was tinged with sadness, as it was announced it would be star halfback Stacey Jones last season with the club before he would join French Super League club, Catalans Dragons. His last match for the team against Manly at Brookvale Oval was a fine way for him to sign off with the club as he scored the match-winning try with three minutes to go in a 22–20 victory.

At the end of the season the structure of the team was reviewed. CEO Mick Watson resigned and was replaced by Wayne Scurrah. Tony Kemp was sacked as coach and his assistant Ivan Cleary replaced him as head coach.

=== Salary cap drama – 2006 ===
Position	Pld	Won	Drew	Lost	Bye	Points for	Points against	Points differential
10th (of 15)	24	12	0	12	2	552	463	+89

In February 2006, the Warriors were found to have committed major breaches of the salary cap in 2005. This followed the high-profile signings of Steve Price and Ruben Wiki. On 27 February the NRL announced the club would be deducted four competition points and the club would also be fined A$430,000.

Even before the penalty the Warriors were expected to struggle and were being picked as wooden spooners in some quarters. With the four-point deduction, the Warriors won their first NRL game away from Auckland, with a 26–10 victory over the reigning premiers, the Wests Tigers, at Jade Stadium in Christchurch.

On 25 June the Warriors recorded their largest ever win, defeating South Sydney 66–0 at Stadium Australia, as part of a four-match winning streak that claimed the scalps of the Sydney Roosters, Newcastle Knights, and also the Penrith Panthers. This streak was ended in an 18–22 golden-point loss to the Bulldogs, in a game where the Warriors surrendered an early 16–0 lead.

The Warriors finished the season on a positive note leaving room for optimism for 2007 and beyond. They caused arguably the upset of the season, defeating the Minor Premiers Melbourne 24–20 at Olympic Park Stadium in Melbourne, preventing the Storm from going the full regular season unbeaten at home.

Impressively, it took the Warriors 24 weeks to be completely out of finals contention. The Warriors finished winning eight of their final twelve games, including a 42–16 thrashing of the Roosters in Round 25, which included four tries by Jerome Ropati. Had the Warriors not suffered the four-point deduction, they would have finished in eighth place on the ladder, and hence would have taken part in the finals series. As it was, they finished tenth on the ladder.

There were a number of revelations in the squad. Halfback Grant Rovelli was a standout performer. Winger Patrick Ah Van cemented a first-grade spot with his performances, while George Gatis and Nathan Fien were fine performers at hooker, and centre Simon Mannering was one of the Warriors' leading backs.

=== Return to the Finals – 2007 ===
Position	Pld	Won	Drew	Lost	Bye	Points for	Points against	Points differential
4th (of 16)	24	13	1	10	1	593	434	+159

The Warriors completed their pre-season with two wins from three games, defeating the Auckland Lions 64–4, losing to the North Queensland Cowboys 32–14 and defeating the Canterbury-Bankstown Bulldogs 36–6.

The Warriors finished the 2007 season in fourth place. The season began with a 34–18 victory over Parramatta at Mt Smart Stadium. The following week the side created history by winning their first two games of the season with a 24–14 victory over premiers, the Brisbane Broncos – the first time they have ever won their opening two games of the season.

After a good start which saw the team sitting in fourth place with a 4–2 win–loss record, the team hit a period of indifferent form, falling into a six match losing streak following a last minute win over South Sydney. The team returned to form, defeating Cronulla 12–2 in wild weather at Toyota Park. Following that victory the side won 9 out of 12 games, with one draw. The Warriors clinched a playoff spot with a 36–14 win over an understrength Manly side, and claimed a home final the following week, defeating the Penrith Panthers 24–20 at Penrith Stadium in Round 25.

The Warriors, by virtue of finishing the regular season in fourth place, won the right to host one of the finals matches in the first week of the playoffs. However, the Warriors narrowly went down to the Parramatta Eels 12–10 at Mount Smart Stadium, and their season ended with a 12–49 loss to the Cowboys in Townsville.

On 30 May the Warriors signed Australian Kangaroos' centre, Brent Tate from 2008 to 2010 in what was described as a "major coup" for the New Zealand club.

=== Second-half revival – 2008 ===
Position	Pld	Won	Drew	Lost	Bye	Points for	Points against	Points differential
8th (of 16)	24	13	0	11	2	502	567	−65

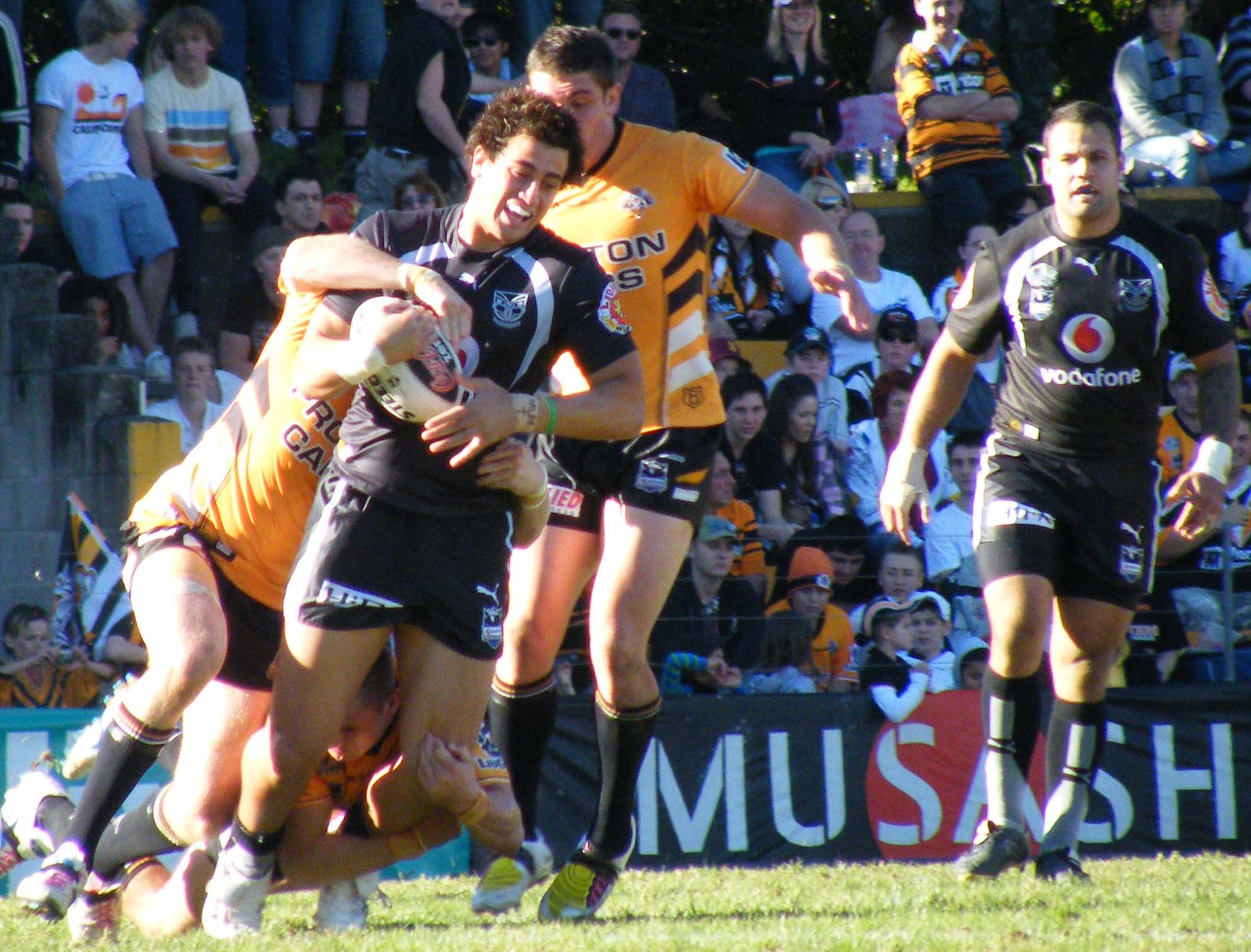
Ben Matulino and Evarn Tuimavave in Round 16 of the 2008 NRL season

The 2008 season did not start as brightly for the club, losing Wade McKinnon for much of the year during a pre-season loss to Newcastle, and losing captain Steve Price (rugby league, born 1974) for ten weeks, as well as injuries to other key players Manu Vatuvei, Jerome Ropati and Michael Witt. The team remained in contention for much of the season, however often performed very poorly away from Mt Smart Stadium, and suffered their first loss to South Sydney (28–35) since 1999, and went on to lose to South Sydney again later in the season (16–18). Despite poor results away, strong home form and a now common revival in the second half of the season saw the Warriors make the top eight for the second season running, incredibly despite spending only three weeks in the top eight all season. A top-eight berth was secured in the last game of the season, when the Warriors defeated the Parramatta Eels 28–6 at Parramatta Stadium, marking the first time since 1995 that the Warriors had won away to Parramatta.

With nothing to lose in the first week of the finals, the Warriors caused a finals upset, and had a victory in the history of the club, defeating the Melbourne Storm 18–15 at Olympic Park; in doing so, they became the first 8th placed team to beat the minor premiers, with Michael Witt scoring two minutes from full-time to clinch the win. Witt taunted Melbourne captain, Cameron Smith, before placing the ball for the historic victory.

In week two of the playoffs, the Warriors came from behind to defeat the Sydney Roosters 30–13 at Mt. Smart Stadium. The Sydney Roosters led 13–6 at halftime before a second-half comeback saw the Warriors pile on twenty-four unanswered points to earn the Warriors a place in the preliminary finals. This was the first time since 2003 that the Warriors have reached the grand final qualifier, and third overall in 14 seasons. They however went down heavily to an inspired Manly Warringah Sea Eagles 32–6.

=== Tragedy strikes – 2009 ===
Position	Pld	Won	Drew	Lost	Bye	Points for	Points against	Points differential
14th (of 16)	24	7	2	15	2	377	545	−188

2009 started with the loss of young up-and-comer Sonny Fai, who drowned at Bethells Beach, near Auckland. He had gone into dangerous surf to rescue some relatives but was probably sucked under by a rip. Almost as if using the occurrence as an inhibitor, the Warriors had a very disappointing year, despite winning the opening two rounds against eventual grand finalists Parramatta Eels 26–18 and reigning premiers Manly Warringah Sea Eagles.

After those great wins they proceeded to win a poor 1 of 8 games including a draw. They did however manage to beat West Tigers 14–0 and Newcastle 13–0 keeping both opponents scoreless, but it was the poor attacking that had every league fan questioning. and ultimately saw them lose their next 3 matches by heavy scores. They did beat the Roosters 30–24 at SFS and Raiders 34–20 at Mt Smart Stadium. But in the end the Warriors lost their final two games against the Bulldogs in Hazem El Masri's last home game [before the finals] and ultimately ended their season losing 0–30 to the eventual premiers Melbourne Storm.

=== Return to finals football – 2010 ===
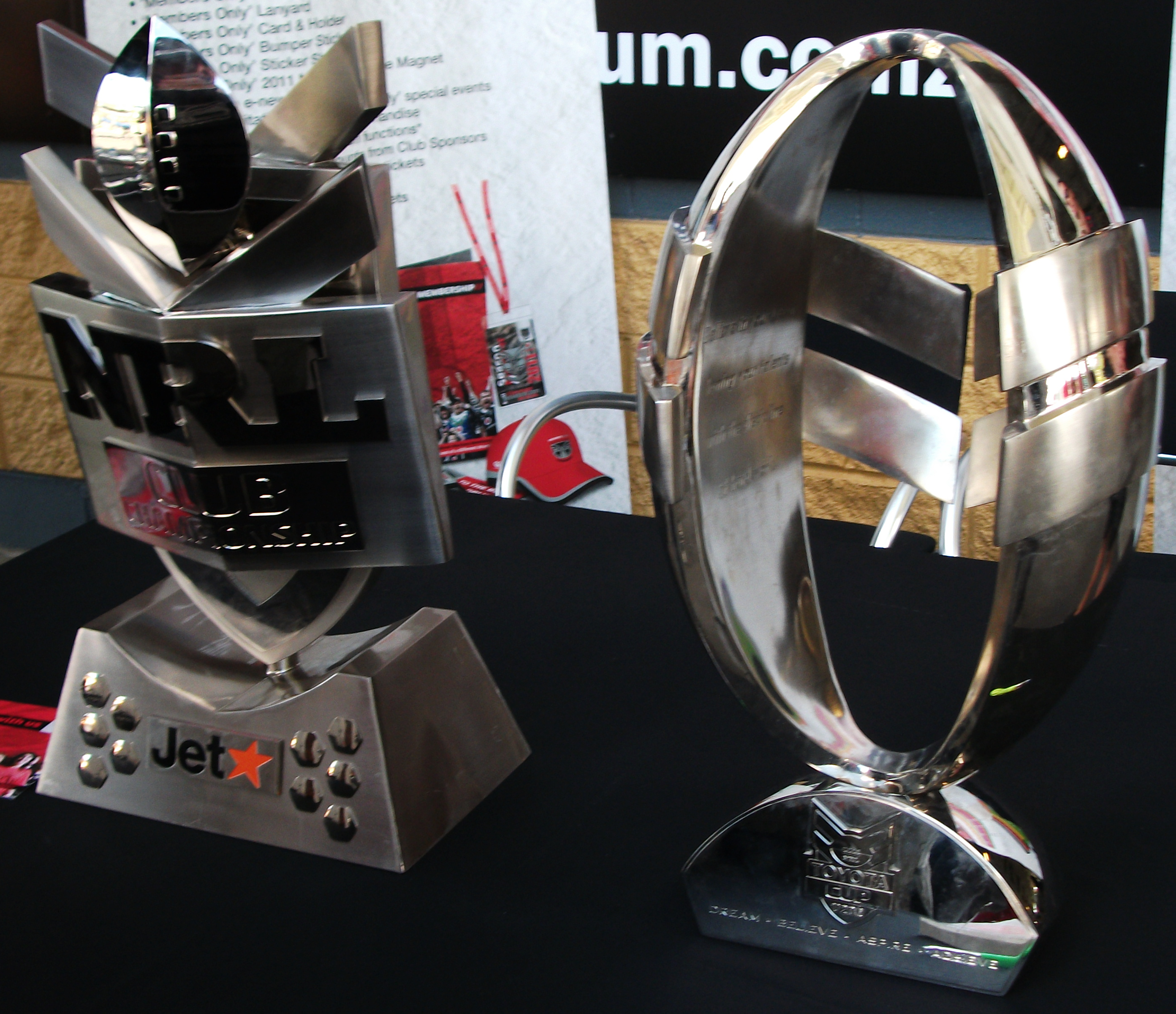
The Club Championship (left) and the Toyota Cup (right), both won in 2010

Position	Pld	Won	Drew	Lost	Bye	Points for	Points against	Points differential
5th (of 16)	24	14	0	10	2	539	486	+53

Expectations were not high for the Warriors in 2010 after a disappointing 2009 season. The Warriors bolstered their playing stocks in the pivotal play-making positions by signing Brett Seymour after he was cut by Cronulla and James Maloney from Melbourne. In arguably one of their best ever performances they humbled the Brisbane Broncos 48–16 at Lang Park in Round 3, with Maloney tying a club-record with 28 points (3 tries and 8 goals). Kevin Locke scored a hat-trick in the Warriors miraculous 20–18 win over the Sydney Roosters at AMI Stadium in Christchurch, narrowly escaping a serious hip injury after a high-speed collision with the goal-post (in the process of scoring the game-winning try). The Warriors won five matches in a row for the first time since late in the 2003 season and finished in 5th position in the regular season. They were knocked out of the finals series in the first week, losing to Gold Coast Titans.

=== Another Grand Final and the dawn of Shaun Johnson – 2011 ===
Position	Pld	Won	Drew	Lost	Bye	Points for	Points against	Points differential
2nd (of 16)	24	14	0	10	2	504	393	+111

2011 started out as emotional for the Warriors, due to the 2011 Christchurch earthquake. The Warriors began the 2011 season with an historic match at Auckland's Eden Park, the first regular season home game the club had played away from Mt Smart Stadium. The match drew a record home game crowd for the Warriors of 38,405; however, the Warriors were beaten 24–18 by the Parramatta Eels. The Warriors went on to lose their following two matches and it appeared that Warriors fans were in for another season of disappointment. To their credit the Warriors bounced back and were in the running for a top four position late in the season but finished in 6th spot. Midway through the season coach Ivan Cleary was approached by the Penrith Panthers and was appointed as their coach for the 2012 season. Cleary remained coach for the remainder of the 2011 season and Brian McClennan was to be appointed his successor for the 2012 season. One of the highlights of the season was the unearthing of the young halfback Shaun Johnson who played a key role as the Warriors approached the 2011 finals series.

In week one of the finals series the Warriors were thrashed 40–10 by the Brisbane Broncos. Other results went the Warriors way and they progressed to week two of the finals where they would meet a high flying Wests Tigers who had completed their 9th straight victory. The match was expected to go the Tigers way however a brilliant second half comeback by the Warriors culminated in a late and controversial try to Krisnan Inu which saw the Warriors win 22–20 and earn the right to play the Melbourne Storm for a place in the Grand Final.

The Warriors traveled to Melbourne as outsiders but turned in what is considered one of the most complete performances in the club's history. The Warriors controlled the match and sealed the Melbourne Storm's fate with Shaun Johnson mesmerising the Storm defence to send Lewis Brown in for the try that would send the Warriors to their second ever Grand Final, where they would meet the Manly Warringah Sea Eagles.

The Warriors would again start the match as heavy underdogs and with a side boasting only three players who had previously played in a Grand Final (Manly on the other hand could boast their coach and eight players who had won the 2008 NRL premiership with the club, plus another who had won a premiership in 2003 with Penrith). Heavy defence from both sides was the feature until the Warriors opened the scoring with a penalty goal to James Maloney in the 28th minute, but a little more than a minute after the restart, a bad read in defence saw prolific try scorer Brett Stewart in for the 1st try. Just before the break, the Warriors were then unlucky not to receive a penalty for obstruction in the lead up to Manly's second try which saw them go into the sheds down 12–2. A further try to Clive Churchill Medal winner Glenn Stewart in the 57th minute saw Manly's lead out to 18–2. The Warriors refused to die however, and clawed their way back with tries to Manu Vatuvei and Elijah Taylor in the 63rd and 68th minutes. Maloney missed both conversions which could have taken the score to 18–14 and a grandstand finish, but a try to Manly captain Jamie Lyon with only a minute remaining put the result beyond doubt as the Warriors were beaten by a clinical Manly outfit 24–10 – yet their effort in reaching their second ever Grand Final (and their first in nine years) was a triumph for the club and departing coach Ivan Cleary and won praise from those in the NRL.

2011 was a successful season all-round for the New Zealand Warriors, with all three grades reaching the Grand Final. The club's NYC team defeated the North Queensland Cowboys 31–30 in golden point extra time in the NYCGrand Final to win their second premiership, while NSW Cup affiliate the Auckland Vulcans went down 30–28 after conceding a last minute try to Canterbury-Bankstown in the NSW Cup Grand Final.

=== Grand Final hangover – 2012 ===
Position	Pld	Won	Drew	Lost	Bye	Points for	Points against	Points differential
14th (of 16)	24	8	0	16	2	497	609	−112

2012 was meant to promise so much for the Warriors following their grand final appearance of 2011. A new coach with a successful track record in Brian 'Bluey' McClennan, a stable squad and strong public support indicated that 2012 could have been the year they finally broke their premiership duck. The season again kicked off with a home game at Eden Park, with a strong crowd of 37,502 witnessing the Warriors go down 20–26 to Manly in a grand final rematch. The match was perhaps an indication of things to come, with the Warriors performing strongly on attack but being let down by weak defence at crucial stages which ultimately cost them the match.

The season did not improve much from that point, with the Warriors failing to find any semblance of consistency throughout the season. There were some highs, such as their 44–22 drubbing of South Sydney, but these were far outweighed by the deep lows. Their season is best summed up by a dismal month of football between Rounds 20 and 23. The Warriors surrendered 19- and 18-nil leads in succession and lost (a first in the history of the game), before leaking 97 points in their next two defeats. In the process they lost all semblance of a quality rugby league team.

Injuries were not kind to the Warriors, with the side using 29 players over the course of the season – the second highest of any team in the NRL. The Warriors season unravelled over the latter rounds. Ultimately Brian McClennan was sacked with three rounds remaining, with assistant coach Tony Iro taking over the reins for the final two rounds. The change of coach did not result in a change of fortunes however, as the Warriors limped out of the season with an eight match long losing streak – a club record.

Following a lengthy search for a new coach former Penrith and Canberra boss Matthew Elliott was appointed as head coach in October 2012.

=== A year under Matt Elliott – 2013 ===
Position	Pld	Won	Drew	Lost	Bye	Points for	Points against	Points differential
11th (of 16)	24	11	0	13	2	495	554	−59

Another horror start for the Warriors in 2013 as they win just 2 of their opening 10 games. The Warriors came back into finals contention winning 7 games out of 8 including a 56–18 win against the Brisbane Broncos in Brisbane. As finals approached the Warriors ended with just 2 wins from their remaining 6 games to see them finish the season 11th. In Round 10, on 18 May the Warriors lost 6–62 to the Penrith Panthers which was their largest ever loss in the club's history. Captain Simon Mannering won the club's Player of the year and Ngani Laumape won Rookie of the year.

In September, after months of speculation, the Warriors confirmed the signing of former Man of Steel winner Sam Tomkins on a three-year deal from English club Wigan Warriors for a record transfer fee of $NZ1,000,000.

=== Third year since grand final; third head coach – 2014 ===
Position	Pld	Won	Drew	Lost	Bye	Points for	Points against	Points differential
9th (of 16)	24	12	0	12	2	571	491	+80

In the First edition of the NRL Auckland Nines, The Warriors were favourites to win. They finished top of their pool winning all three games but lost the semi-final to eventual winners North Queensland Cowboys. The Warriors started the season two wins and two losses but in Round 5 after a 37–6 loss to Cronulla-Sutherland Sharks the club sacked head coach Matthew Elliott replacing him former Canberra Raiders player Andrew McFadden. The Warriors missed the playoffs for the 3rd season in a row after missing out on points difference to the Brisbane Broncos. Simon Mannering won his 4th Player of the year award, while David Fusitu'a won Rookie of the year.

=== A year of McFadden; some success, then the losses mount – 2015 ===
Position	Pld	Won	Drew	Lost	Bye	Points for	Points against	Points differential
13th (of 16)	24	9	0	15	2	445	588	−143

The 2015 season marked 20 years since the Warriors first joined the Australian professional rugby league now known as the NRL.

The Warriors were knocked out in the quarter-finals of the 2015 NRL Auckland Nines by eventual runners up Cronulla-Sutherland Sharks.

Warriors ended the season with eight consecutive loses after Shaun Johnson broke his ankle while scoring a try against Manly Warringah Sea Eagles in Round 20. Ben Matulino was named club Player of the year with Tuimoala Lolohea named club Rookie of the year.

=== Big name signings – 2016 ===
Position	Pld	Won	Drew	Lost	Bye	Points for	Points against	Points differential
10th (of 16)	24	10	0	14	2	513	601	−88

To start 2016 the team welcomed the major signings of 2015 Dally M Fullback of the Year Roger Tuivasa-Sheck, from the Sydney Roosters and Kiwi international Issac Luke, from the South Sydney Rabbitohs. The Warriors finished as runners-up in the 2016 NRL Auckland Nines, losing to the Parramatta Eels in the final, 22–4.

The Warriors started the season losing their first three matches. The Warriors beat the Newcastle Knights 40–18 to record their first win of the season and then defeated the Sydney Roosters in a Golden Point thriller in Gosford a week later. After a loss to Melbourne Storm on Anzac Day, the team came under scrutiny with many calling for the sacking of coach, Andrew McFadden. As well as this, six Warriors players were stood down after mixing prescription drugs with energy drinks.

After 11 rounds, the Warriors stood at four wins from 11 games. As State of Origin came into effect, the Warriors started to elevate their performance. Winning four from five games, with the exception being a golden point loss to the table-topping Cronulla-Sutherland Sharks. After Round 18, the Warriors were in the top eight and needing only to win four out of their final eight games with three of their final four games on home turf. An achievable target, however, the club recorded just two wins from their final eight games to finish tenth on the ladder and for the fifth year in a row, missed out on finals. Simon Mannering received his fifth Warriors Player of the Year.

On 12 September 2016, it was announced that Kiwis coach Stephen Kearney would replace Andrew McFadden as head coach for 2017, with McFadden being retained as an assistant.

=== The Kiwis spine – 2017 ===
Position	Pld	Won	Drew	Lost	Bye	Points for	Points against	Points differential
13th (of 16)	24	7	0	17	2	444	575	−131

After the restructuring of the Warriors coaching staff and with the signing of Kieran Foran, there was much anticipation leading into the season for the team as the side featured the 2015 Kiwis "spine" (Tuivasa-Sheck, Foran, Johnson, Luke), and coach, Stephen Kearney. The Auckland Nines were perhaps a sign of things to come as the Warriors were left win-less and at the bottom of their pool. They kicked off the regular season with a narrow victory over the Newcastle Knights. It would be one of few wins for the 2017 season. Heading into their first bye of the season, they had won six from 14 games. After that bye, they defeated the Canterbury-Bankstown Bulldogs at Mt Smart Stadium in what would turn out to be their last win of the season. After that, the Warriors would go on a losing streak until the season's end, creating a club record of nine straight losses and one of the worst seasons in the club's history. As well as this, notable names such as Ryan Hoffman, Jacob Lillyman, Charlie Gubb and Kieran Foran had left the club. After so much promise and hype leading up to the championship, it seemed to have been all too familiar for Warriors fans. So much so, during a school visit in September, after their season had ended, one student asked them why they were "so bad", while another, who had little knowledge of rugby league, asked them where they finished on the competition ladder.

In December 2017, the New Zealand Warriors expressed their interest in applying for a licence to participate in the inaugural NRL Women's season.

=== Tuivasa-Sheck dominates to end finals drought – 2018 ===
Position	Pld	Won	Drew	Lost	Bye	Points for	Points against	Points differential
8th (of 16)	24	15	0	9	1	472	447	25

After a dismal 2017 season, the Warriors made a few key signings. This included experienced New Zealand Internationals Gerard Beale, Adam Blair, Tohu Harris and Peta Hiku. Significantly it also included veteran journeyman playmaker Blake Green, along with Agnatius Paasi, Leivaha Pulu, Anthony Gelling and Karl Lawton. In the beginning of the year, many people tipped that the Warriors would finish last, and claim their first wooden spoon in history. But surprisingly enough, the Warriors began the season with five straight wins, their best ever start to a season, which included away wins over the Sydney Roosters, Canberra Raiders and the South Sydney Rabbitohs, marking their first win in Perth from numerous attempts. They ended up finishing 8th, but only two competition points out of 4th in one of the closest top 8's in NRL History, they played Penrith Panthers in an elimination final on Saturday 8 September at Stadium Australia. This was their first finals series appearance since 2011, but lost to Penrith 27–12.

In April 2018, the Warriors would be sold by long-time owner, Eric Watson, to the Carlaw Heritage Trust and Autex Industries, for $NZ16 million.

To top off the year, Roger Tuivasa-Sheck won the Dally M Medal, becoming the first Warriors player to do so, and the Warriors would become one of four inaugural teams in the NRLW.

This would also be the end of Shaun Johnson's first stint at the Warriors.

=== A disappointing 25th season – 2019 ===
Position	Pld	Won	Drew	Lost	Bye	Points for	Points against	Points differential
13th (of 16)	24	9	1	14	1	433	571	−141

The club celebrated its 25th season in top level Rugby League in 2019 by returning to their original jersey and colours, as well as modifying their logo close to their original 1995 logo (with Auckland being replaced by New Zealand). The season got off to a near-perfect start for the Warriors, defeating the Canterbury-Bankstown Bulldogs 40–6 at home, which was played the day after the 2019 Christchurch Mosque Shootings. But then things started to go downhill for the club losing heavily in their next two games against the Tigers (34–6), and the Sea Eagles (46–12). A 26–10 win over the Gold Coast Titans at home gave the club hope that 2019 would be as successful as 2018 as, but four straight losses, including close losses against South Sydney in Round 5 (28–24), and a controversial loss to the Melbourne club on Anzac Day (13–12) almost wrote off any chance of another finals appearance. The Warriors then won their next two games against St. George Illawarra (26–18), and Penrith (30–10), but they were unable to win at home, holding a six-game losing streak at Mt Smart, which was finally broken in their shock 24–16 win over Manly in Round 21. But after the win over Manly Warringah, the Warriors were beaten by the Sydney Roosters 42–6, Cronulla 42–16, and South Sydney 31–10 ending any chance of another finals appearance. However, they were able to end the season on a positive note, beating the 4th placed Canberra Raiders 24–20 in Canberra.

After 16 months of joint ownership, Autex Industries would become the sole owner of the team after buying out the 66% share in the Warriors owned by the Carlaw Heritage Trust.

=== COVID Season 1 – An Unexpected Sacrifice – 2020 ===
Position	Pld	Won	Drew	Lost	Bye	Points for	Points against	Points differential
10th (of 16)	20	8	0	12	0	343	458	−115

Going into the 2020 NRL season, the Warriors were looking to improve on their dismal 2019 campaign. However, even before kick off of their first-round game against the Newcastle Knights, New Zealand Prime Minister Jacinda Ardern announced that people travelling into New Zealand would be subject to a mandatory self-isolation period of 14 days due to the COVID-19 pandemic, this not only meant that the Warriors would have to self isolate for 14 days and not play should they return home, but it would be nearly impossible to accommodate visiting sides. As a consequence the Warriors-based themselves in the Northern New South Wales town of Kingscliff and moved their round 2 game on 21 March against the Canberra Raiders to Cbus Super Stadium on the Gold Coast. Two days after the Raiders game, the NRL suspended the competition, with the aim to resume a shortened season to be held over 20 rounds (including the first two rounds that have already taken place) by 28 May. When the competition resumed, the Warriors started their new campaign on a perfect note, in a memorable 18–0 win over St George Illawarra at their temporary home at Central Coast Stadium. On 20 June, the day after an embarrassing 40–12 loss to South Sydney, the Warriors sacked Stephen Kearney as coach with former Wests Tigers premiership player Todd Payten taking over as caretaker coach. However, despite their performances, they did improve in the second half of the season with back to back wins over the Wests Tigers (26–20) and Manly (26–22) and were gallant in their loss to the Sydney Roosters (18–10). The Warriors ended up finishing 10th, and saw 2020 as a year of success despite not qualifying for the finals. They flew home on 28 September following their 40–28 win over the Manly Warringah Sea Eagles.

=== COVID Season 2 – Central Coast Warriors – 2021 ===
Position	Pld	Won	Drew	Lost	Bye	Points for	Points against	Points differential
12th (of 16)	24	8	0	16	1	453	624	−171

Before the 2021 season, the Warriors signed former St. George Illawarra and Newcastle Knights coach Nathan Brown as head coach. Despite having to be based on the Central Coast again due to a lack of a travel bubble between Australia and New Zealand, the Warriors went into the new season with optimism, firstly, the Warriors upset a star studded Gold Coast 19–6 in their season opener at Gosford. The following week, Newcastle narrowly beat the Warriors 16–20 and were largely written off for their round 3 clash against Canberra at Canberra Stadium, after trailing 31–10 at the 48 minute mark, the Warriors produced their biggest ever comeback scoring 24 unanswered points to win 34–31.

On Easter Sunday, the Sydney Roosters beat the Warriors 32–12 at the Sydney Cricket Ground despite the Warriors being in touch in the first half and would the following week let Manly Warringah in for their first win of the season losing by a Daly Cherry-Evans field goal to record their 2nd loss by less than 6 points in 4 weeks. On 6 April, it was announced that the Trans Tasman bubble had opened two ways, but due to risks that the borders could close and the Warriors and any away team travelling to New Zealand could be stuck there and the NRL could be suspended, the Warriors decided to base themselves in Gosford for the entire year. The Warriors did record some impressive victories since the announcement, upsetting St. George Illawarra at Kogarah 20–14, holding on to beat North Queensland 24–20 in Gosford and winning a thriller to beat the Wests Tigers 30–26 also played in Gosford. The Warriors did not make the finals, as they had a seven-game losing streak between Rounds 12 to 19 and lost their last three games, including a 44–0 loss to the Gold Coast which was labeled as their worst performance of the season.

=== COVID Season 3 – Homecoming with No Wooden Spoon – 2022 ===
Position	Pld	Won	Drew	Lost	Bye	Points for	Points against	Points differential
15th (of 16)	24	6	0	18	1	408	700	−292

The Warriors began their season with two losses with defeats against St. George Illawarra in Round 1 (28–16) and the Gold Coast Titans in Round 2 (20–18). Before going on to win their next three matches, beating the Wests Tigers (16–12), Brisbane (20–6) and North Queensland (25–24). However, that streak came to an end when they suffered a defeat to the Sydney Roosters in Round 6 (22–14).

After the 3–3 start to the season, the Warriors went on to lose eight of their next nine games including defeats to Cronulla in Round 9 (29–10) in a game where the Cronulla side was reduced to 11 players and a 70–10 loss to Melbourne on ANZAC Day which is the club's biggest loss in their history.

In this stretch, coach Nathan Brown was sacked following a 44–10 defeat to the Manly-Warringah Sea Eagles.

On 3 July, the Warriors returned home to play at Mt Smart Stadium in New Zealand for the first time in 1038 days. They hosted the Wests Tigers in front of a sold-out crowd of 26,009. They would go on to win the match by a score of 22–2, breaking a 7-game losing streak.

In the Warriors remaining three home games of the season, the Warriors would go on to lose to the Melbourne Storm 24–12, where winger Ed Kosi scored the only points for the Warriors with 3 tries in his second game since being dropped after the Warriors record-breaking loss to the Storm earlier in the season, win against the Canterbury-Bankstown Bulldogs 42–18, the team's biggest win since 2016, and lose to the Gold Coast Titans 27–26 in extra time of the final game of the season, after surrendering a 14-point lead in the final 7 minutes of the match.

In September 2022, the Warriors principal sponsor Vodafone New Zealand announced they would change their name to One NZ, as they are also naming rights sponsor, the Warriors subsequently announced they would change their name to the One New Zealand Warriors from November 2022 onwards.

=== 'Up the Wahs' as the Warriors surge into the top four – 2023 ===
Position	Pld	Won	Drew	Lost	Bye	Points for	Points against	Points differential
4th (of 17)	24	16	0	8	3	572	448	124

After 3 years playing out of Australia, the Warriors returned to New Zealand full-time in 2023.

The Warriors had a large amount of turnover from the 2022 season, which included the signings of Kiwis representatives Marata Niukore, Charnze Nicoll-Klokstad, and Te Maire Martin, as well as 2016 assistant coach Andrew Webster rejoining the club after spending the past two seasons with the Penrith Panthers as an assistant, winning two consecutive premierships.

The team started the year 3–1, which featured victories over the North Queensland Cowboys in Townsville, ending the longest away losing streak in club history, as well as the second biggest comeback in club history, defeating the Cronulla-Sutherland Sharks 32–30 after trailing 26–6 in the first half, which would win the Halberg Awards (which recognises New Zealand's top sporting achievements) "favourite Sporting Moment" for 2023.

Following a strong start to the year, the team went on to win 2 of their next 7 games, which included 3 consecutive defeats to the Melbourne Storm, Sydney Roosters, and Penrith Panthers, 3 teams which were considered premiership favourites in the preseason, in an 11-day stretch.

With several "contentious" calls in each of the three games, as well as the amount of travel required in a short period, One NZ CEO, Jason Paris, took to Twitter to voice frustrations with the NRL and its referees, saying "Are you kidding me? How biased are the @NRL bunker and referees against the @NZWarriors? Have they got money on them to lose?" It's like we are permanently against 14 on the field and they want us to play with 12". Following the threat of legal action by the NRL Referees, Paris apologized for his remarks.

After the 2–5 stretch, the team went on the win 10 of their remaining 12 matches, including 7 consecutively, and 3 games scoring 40+ points. During this period the team also went on to set a new record for consecutive away wins, and secure their first top 4 berth since 2007.

The team faced the Penrith Panthers in the week one qualifying final, missing halfback Shaun Johnson through injury, they went on to lose the match 32–6, in Sydney.

In week two, the Warriors played the Newcastle Knights at home, defeating the Knights 40–12 to qualify for their first Preliminary Final since 2011. The game would be the 2nd largest attendance in the club's history at Mount Smart Stadium, and the third largest attendance for a rugby league match at the ground (26,083).

In the preliminary final in Brisbane against the Broncos, the team was competitive the first half, going into the break 24–12, a score which could have been 24–18 if not for 3 consecutive missed conversion attempts. The second half resulted in a blowout, with the Broncos scoring 3 unanswered tries to finish the game 42–12.

At the annual Dally M Awards, Addin Fonua-Blake and Dallin Watene-Zelezniak were awarded Prop and Winger of the Year respectively, while Shaun Johnson was named the Halfback of the Year, and lost by 1 point in the Dally M Medal race, finishing in 2nd place to Kalyn Ponga. This decision is marred in controversy, as the majority of fans and current and former NRL players claimed he was the clear winner and the most consistent over the whole season. Andrew Webster was named Coach of the Year, winning the award over his former lead coach Ivan Cleary, who was nominated also.

The year also saw a rise of the "Wahs" nickname, with the phrase "Up the Wahs" becoming a sensation. The nickname is contentious among some supporters of the club.

=== Disappointment in Johnson's final season – 2024 ===
Position	Pld	Won	Drew	Lost	Bye	Points for	Points against	Points differential
13th (of 17)	24	9	1	14	3	512	574	−62

Entering the season with some of the highest expectations in the history of the club, after finishing one game short of the Grand Final the year prior, bolstered by the return of former Dally M Medalist, and club captain Roger Tuivasa-Sheck from rugby union, and Origin representative Kurt Capewell from the Brisbane Broncos, the season would take a hit early with Addin Fonua-Blake requesting an immediate release to return to Australia. Fonua-Blake's request for a release would be accepted, but he would only be free to leave at the end of the 2024 season.

The team showed glimpses of the form shown the previous season, but inconsistency and injuries saw many games decided by small margins, with the team losing 8 of 14 games by 8 points or less, which featured one game being lost with an acrobatic try from Xavier Coates after the full-time siren, two games by field goals in Golden Point, and one game by 2 points due to 3 missed conversions. There were several occasions where the team had great starts in games only to get run down and go on to lose. There was also a 66–6 loss to the Titans in round 16, the Warriors equal worst loss in history. However, they were also able to beat the top teams such as the Panthers where they won 22–20 in Magic Round.

Mitch Barnett would make his State of Origin debut during the season, marking the first New South Welshmen to debut as a Warriors player, and just the third Warriors player to make their State of Origin debut with the club, after PJ Marsh and Kevin Campion.

The season would be the final one of club legend Shaun Johnson's career. Announcing his retirement between Round 22 and Round 23. In the final match of the season, the team would make a 16-point comeback in the second half, the third largest in club history, and win the game off a cutout ball from Johnson to Dallin Watene-Zelezniak to score a try with less than 30 seconds remaining in the match.

Despite the relatively poor performances, the Warriors would go on to sell out every home game of the season, which is believed to be a first for an Australasian sporting franchise, as well as a first for either rugby code.

2024 would also see the club purchase a hospitality venue in the Auckland suburb of Kingsland. Refurbished and rebranded in September as "Full Time Sports Bar & Eatery".

=== ACL - The Warriors’ Achilles Heel' – 2025 ===
Position	Pld	Won	Drew	Lost	Bye	Points for	Points against	Points differential
6th (of 17)	24	14	0	10	3	517	496	21

A down year was expected of the Warriors following the departures of Addin Fonua-Blake, and Shaun Johnson, as well as the abrupt retirement of club captain Tohu Harris in the middle of the preaseason.

Following the retirement of Harris, Mitchell Barnett and new recruit, Kiwis captain, James Fisher-Harris, were named co-captains for the season.

For the second year running, the NRL began the season in the United States, with the Warriors selected to participate in the opening match of the season at Allegiant Stadium in Las Vegas, Nevada.

With approximately 10,000 Warriors fans making the trip for the game, the Warriors would go on to lose the match 30 – 8 against the Canberra Raiders.

Following the game in Vegas, the Warriors would go on to win 8 of their next 10 games. With the exception of a 28-point loss to the Melbourne Storm and a 14-point victory over the Newcastle Knights, all games were decided by 6 points or less.

During this stretch, the Warriors finished between 2nd and 4th on the ladder each week. With new halfback Luke Metcalf going on to lead the Dally M Player of the Year Leaderboard before voting went behind closed doors in Round 12.

In Round 13, the Warriors would play the South Sydney Rabbitohs, with co-captain Barnett backing up 4 days after playing in his second State of Origin match, he would go on to tear his ACL while falling awkwardly making a tackle. The Warriors would go on to win the game by 6 points.

In Round 17, the Warriors would play the Brisbane Broncos, where Luke Metcalf would go on to tear his ACL. Despite a 14-point loss in the game, the Warriors would finish the round in 4th place, two wins ahead of the Broncos in 5th place.

Following Metcalf's injury, the team would go on to win just 4 of their remaining 9 games, punctuated by losses to the wooden-spoon favourites, the Titans, and a final-minute loss to the Dolphins, who were down to 12 players.

As a result of their end-of-season form, the Warriors would slip to 6th place and face the four-time defending premiers, the Penrith Panthers, at home in the first week of the finals.

Despite low expectations, the Warriors would trail by just 4 points until the 65th minute of the game, after which a pair of errors by Charnze Nicoll-Klokstad would see the Panthers pull away with two late tries, ending the Warriors' season.

At the end of the season awards, off-season recruit Erin Clark would go on to win the Lock of the Year, having filled the position of the retired Harris, and Dylan Walker who departed the team in the first month of the season. Luke Metcalf would finish 8th place in the Player of the Year voting, and just 5 points out of 2nd place, despite missing the final 10 weeks of the season.

=== No Retreat, No Surrender for Warrior Nation – 2026 ===
Position	Pld	Won	Drew	Lost	Bye	Points for	Points against	Points differential
2nd (of 17)	24	18	0	6	3	728	418	310

The Warriors exceeded expectations in 2026, finishing second at the end of the regular season. In the first week of finals, the Warriors played the third-placed Redcliffe Dolphins, losing 26-16 at Mt Smart.

=== Season summaries ===
Chart of yearly table positions for New Zealand Warriors in First Grade NRL

P=Premiers, R=Runners-up, M=Minor Premierships, F=Finals Appearance, W=Wooden Spoons (Brackets Represent Finals Games)
Competition	Games played	Games won	Games drawn	Games lost	Ladder position	P	R	M	F	W	Coach	Captain	Details
1995 ARL season	22	13	0	9	10 / 20						John Monie	Dean Bell	Auckland Warriors 1995
1996 ARL season	21	10	0	11	11 / 20						John Monie	Greg Alexander	Auckland Warriors 1996
1997 SL season	18	7	0	11	7 / 10						John Monie→Frank Endacott	Matthew Ridge	Auckland Warriors 1997
1998 NRL season	24	9	0	15	15 / 20						Frank Endacott	Matthew Ridge	Auckland Warriors 1998
1999 NRL season	24	10	0	14	11 / 17						Mark Graham	Matthew Ridge	Auckland Warriors 1999
2000 NRL season	26	8	2	16	13 / 14						Mark Graham	John Simon	Auckland Warriors 2000
2001 NRL season	26 (1)	12 (0)	2 (0)	12 (1)	8 / 14				♦		Daniel Anderson	Kevin Campion & Stacey Jones	New Zealand Warriors 2001
2002 NRL season	24 (3)	17 (2)	0 (0)	7 (1)	1 / 15		♦	♦	♦		Daniel Anderson	Kevin Campion & Stacey Jones	New Zealand Warriors 2002
2003 NRL season	24 (3)	15 (2)	0 (0)	9 (1)	6 / 15				♦		Daniel Anderson	Monty Betham	New Zealand Warriors 2003
2004 NRL season	24	6	0	18	14 / 15						Daniel Anderson→Tony Kemp	Monty Betham	New Zealand Warriors 2004
2005 NRL season	24	10	0	14	11 / 15						Tony Kemp	Steve Price	New Zealand Warriors 2005
2006 NRL season	24	12	0	12	10 / 15						Ivan Cleary	Steve Price	New Zealand Warriors 2006
2007 NRL season	24 (2)	13 (0)	1 (0)	10 (2)	4 / 16				♦		Ivan Cleary	Steve Price	New Zealand Warriors 2007
2008 NRL season	24 (3)	13 (2)	0 (0)	11 (1)	8 / 16				♦		Ivan Cleary	Steve Price	New Zealand Warriors 2008
2009 NRL season	24	7	2	15	14 / 16						Ivan Cleary	Steve Price	New Zealand Warriors 2009
2010 NRL season	24 (1)	14 (0)	0 (0)	10 (1)	5 / 16				♦		Ivan Cleary	Simon Mannering	New Zealand Warriors 2010
2011 NRL season	24 (4)	14(2)	0 (0)	10 (2)	6 / 16		♦		♦		Ivan Cleary	Simon Mannering	New Zealand Warriors 2011
2012 NRL season	24	8	0	16	14 / 16						Brian McClennan→Tony Iro	Simon Mannering	New Zealand Warriors 2012
2013 NRL season	24	11	0	13	11 / 16						Matthew Elliott	Simon Mannering	New Zealand Warriors 2013
2014 NRL season	24	12	0	12	9 / 16						Matthew Elliott→Andrew McFadden	Simon Mannering	New Zealand Warriors 2014
2015 NRL season	24	9	0	15	13 / 16						Andrew McFadden	Simon Mannering	New Zealand Warriors 2015
2016 NRL season	24	10	0	14	10 / 16						Andrew McFadden	Ryan Hoffman	New Zealand Warriors 2016
2017 NRL season	24	7	0	17	13 / 16						Stephen Kearney	Roger Tuivasa-Sheck	New Zealand Warriors 2017
2018 NRL season	24 (1)	15 (0)	0 (0)	9 (1)	8 / 16				♦		Stephen Kearney	Roger Tuivasa-Sheck	New Zealand Warriors 2018
2019 NRL season	24	9	1	14	13 / 16						Stephen Kearney	Roger Tuivasa-Sheck	New Zealand Warriors 2019
2020 NRL season	20	8	0	12	10 / 16						Stephen Kearney→Todd Payten	Roger Tuivasa-Sheck	New Zealand Warriors 2020
2021 NRL season	24	8	0	16	12 / 16						Nathan Brown	Roger Tuivasa-Sheck→Tohu Harris	New Zealand Warriors 2021
2022 NRL season	24	6	0	18	15 / 16						Nathan Brown→Stacey Jones	Tohu Harris	New Zealand Warriors 2022
2023 NRL season	24 (3)	16 (1)	0	8 (2)	4 / 17				♦		Andrew Webster	Tohu Harris	New Zealand Warriors 2023
2024 NRL season	24	9	1	14	13 / 17						Andrew Webster	Tohu Harris	New Zealand Warriors 2024
2025 NRL season	24 (1)	14	0	10 (1)	6 / 17				♦		Andrew Webster	Mitch Barnett & James Fisher-Harris	New Zealand Warriors 2025
2026 NRL season	24	18	0	6 (2)	2 / 17				♦		Andrew Webster	Mitch Barnett & James Fisher-Harris	New Zealand Warriors 2026

=== Finals appearances ===
11 (2001, 2002, 2003, 2007, 2008, 2010, 2011, 2018, 2023, 2025, 2026)

== 2026 squad ==
New Zealand Warriors 2027 squad
Top 30 squad - 2027 NRL season			Supplementary list	Coaching staff
Grant Anderson – CE; Tanah Boyd – HB; Kurt Capewell – SR; Erin Clark – LK; Wayde Egan (vc) – HK; James Fisher-Harris (c) – PR; Jackson Ford – PR; Leka Halasima – SR; Chanel Harris-Tavita – FE; Sam Healey – HK	Eddie Ieremia-Toeava – SR; Alofiana Khan-Pereira – WG; Jacob Laban – SR; Ali Leiataua – CE; Jye Linnane – FE; Te Maire Martin – FE; Haizyn Mellars – WG; Sam McIntyre – SR; Charnze Nicoll-Klokstad – FB; Riley Price – PR	Jason Salalilo – PR; Tanner Stowers-Smith – PR; Taine Tuaupiki – WG, FB; Demitric Vaimauga – PR; Will Warbrick – WG; Dallin Watene-Zelezniak – WG	Bailey Biondi-Odo – HB; Jeremiah Lemana – CE; Bishop Neal – SR; Joseph Ratcliffe – FB; Makaia Tafua – HK	Head coach: Andrew Webster; Assistant coaches: Richard Agar (Backs); Stacey Jones (Halves & Special Plays); Slade Griffin (Forwards); Balin Cupples (High Performance); Kai Kara-France (Wrestling); Daryl Halligan (Goalkicking); David Tangata-Toa (NSW Cup coach); Legend: (c) Captain(s); (vc) Vice-captain(s); Updated: 17 November 2026; Source(s): Warriors Football Department

=== 2026 signings & transfers ===
IN

Player	Previous club	Ref.
Morgan Gannon	Leeds Rhinos	
Harry Inch	Tasman / Crusaders (rugby union)	
Alofiana Khan-Pereira	Gold Coast Titans	
Jye Linnane	Newcastle Knights	
Braelan Marsh	Redcliffe Dolphins	
Haizyn Mellars	South Sydney Rabbitohs	

OUT

Player	Future club	Ref.
Bunty Afoa	Wests Tigers	
Tom Ale	Penrith Panthers	
Morgan Harper	Newtown Jets	
Edward Kosi	South Sydney Rabbitohs	
Kalani Going	Penrith Panthers	
Moala Graham-Taufa	South Sydney Rabbitohs	
Freddy Lussick	Penrith Panthers	

== Captains ==
There have been 12 full-time captains of the Warriors since their first season in 1995. The current captains are Mitch Barnett and James Fisher-Harris.

No	Captain	Years	Games	Notes
1	Dean Bell	1995	19	Inaugural Captain
2	Duane Mann	1995	1	Injury replacement
3	Stephen Kearney	1995–1998	5	Injury replacement
4	Greg Alexander	1996	21	
5	Matthew Ridge	1997–1999	42	
6	Denis Betts	1997	0	Injury replacement
7	Brian Kelland	1998	3	Injury replacement
8	Stacey Jones	1999–2005	69	
9	John Simon	1999–2000	31	
10	Terry Hermansson	2000	4	Injury replacement
11	Kevin Campion	2001	23	
12	Monty Betham	2002–2005	40	
13	Ivan Cleary	2002	3	Injury replacement
14	Awen Guttenbeil	2003–2004	9	Injury replacement
15	Steve Price	2005–2009	90	2007 Dally M Captain of the Year
16	Ruben Wiki	2006–2008	12	Injury replacement
17	Micheal Luck	2008–2012	15	Injury replacement
18	Simon Mannering	2010–2018	133	Most matches as Warriors Captain
19	Brent Tate	2010	2	Injury replacement
20	Manu Vatuvei	2012	5	Injury replacement
21	Sam Rapira	2013	1	Injury replacement
22	Ryan Hoffman	2016–2017	24	
23	Roger Tuivasa-Sheck	2017–2021	104	2020 Dally M Captain of the Year
24	Blake Green	2018	2	Injury replacement
25	Issac Luke	2019	1	Injury replacement
25	Tohu Harris	2020–2024	50	
26	Addin Fonua-Blake	2021–2022	16	Injury replacement
27	Peta Hiku	2021	1	Injury replacement
28	Wayde Egan	2023–2024	4	Injury replacement
29	Dylan Walker	2023	1	Injury replacement
29	Mitch Barnett	2024	13	Incumbent
30	James Fisher-Harris	2025	4	Incumbent
31	Kurt Capewell	2025	1	Injury replacement

== Coaches ==
As of end of 2026 season.

There have been 15 coaches of the Warriors since their first season in 1995. The current coach is Andrew Webster.

No	Name	Seasons	Games	Wins	Draws	Losses	Win %	Premiers	Runners-up	Minor premiers	Wooden spoons	Notes
1	John Monie	1995–1997	52	26	0	26	50%	—	—	—	—	Sacked mid-season
2	Frank Endacott	1997–1998	33	13	0	20	39.4%	—	—	—	—	—
3	Mark Graham	1999–2000	50	18	2	30	36%	—	—	—	—	—
4	Daniel Anderson	2001–2004	92	51	2	39	55.4%	—	2002	2002	—	First finals appearance in 2001; First minor premiership in 2002; First grand final appearance in 2002; Resigned mid-season 2004
5	Tony Kemp	2004–2005	37	13	0	24	35.1%	—	—	—	—	—
6	Ivan Cleary	2006–2011	137	68	3	66	49.6%	—	2011	—	—	—
7	Brian McClennan	2012	22	8	0	14	36.4%	—	—	—	—	Sacked mid-season
8	Tony Iro	2012	2	0	0	2	0%	—	—	—	—	Caretaker Coach
9	Matthew Elliott	2013–2014	29	13	0	16	44.8%	—	—	—	—	Sacked mid-season
10	Andrew McFadden	2014–2016	67	29	0	38	43.2%	—	—	—	—	—
11	Stephen Kearney	2017–2020	79	33	1	45	41.8%	—	—	—	—	Sacked mid-season
12	Todd Payten	2020	14	6	0	8	42.9%	—	—	—	—	Caretaker coach
13	Nathan Brown	2021–2022	31	11	0	19	35.4%	—	—	—	—	Resigned mid-season
14	Stacey Jones	2022	11	2	0	9	18.2%	—	—	—	—	Caretaker coach
15	Andrew Webster	2023–	102	58	1	43	56.9%	—	—	—	—	Incumbent coach

== Logos ==
Original logo for the Auckland Warriors

The original logo was designed by Francis Allan. It featured a tekoteko in white, blue, and green, with a curved tongue.

In 1999, the tongue was straightened, because a curved tongue was considered a sign of weakness.

In 2002, the logo's colour scheme was changed to silver and black.

A celebratory 20th anniversary logo for 2015 featured a split colour scheme, with the original green, white, and blue on the left side paying homage to the original design, and the new silver and grey on the right side.

A celebratory 25th anniversary logo for 2020 fully restored the original colour scheme (but with the straightened tongue), and this design has continued to be used since.

== Kits ==
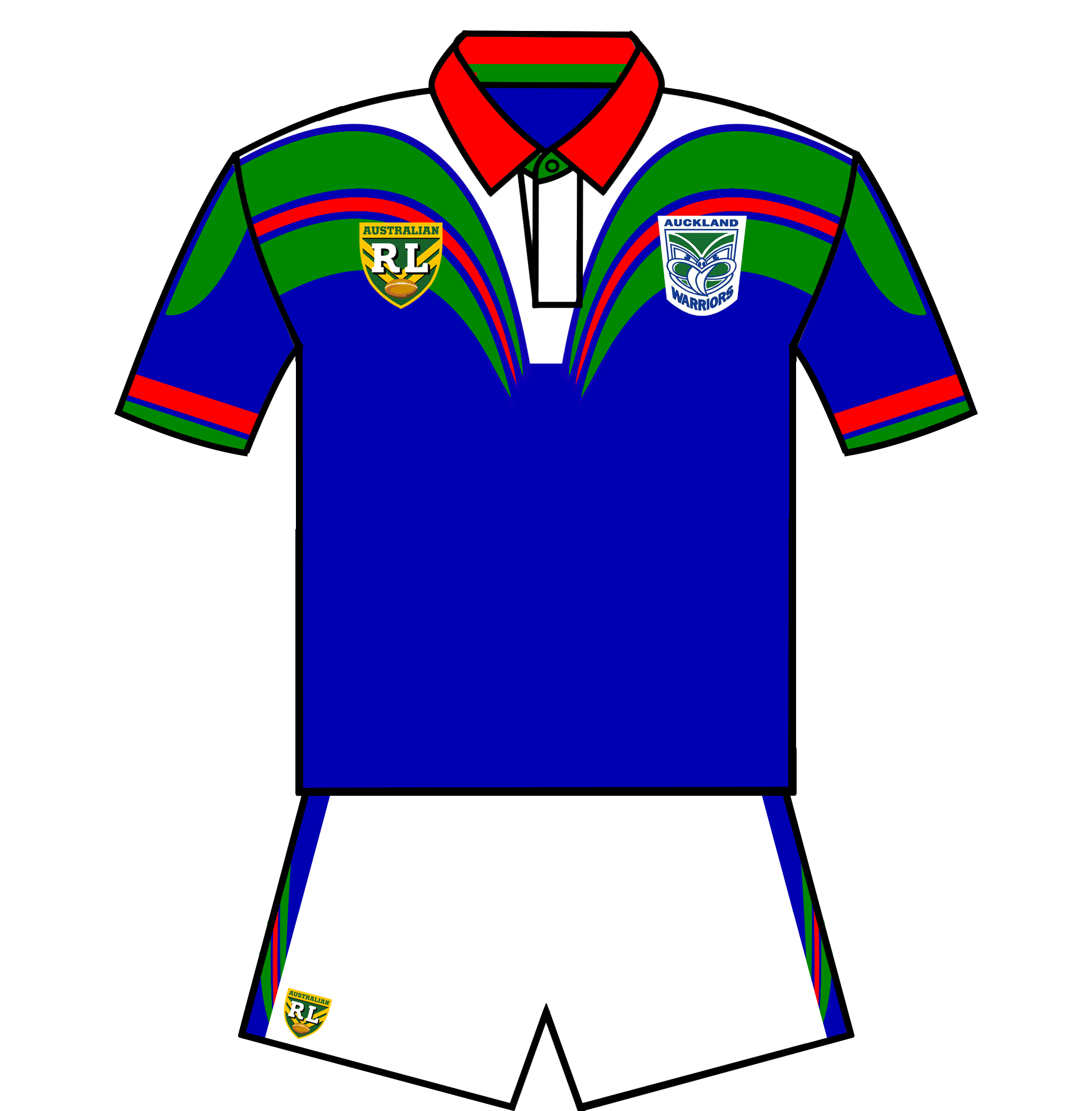
1995–1996

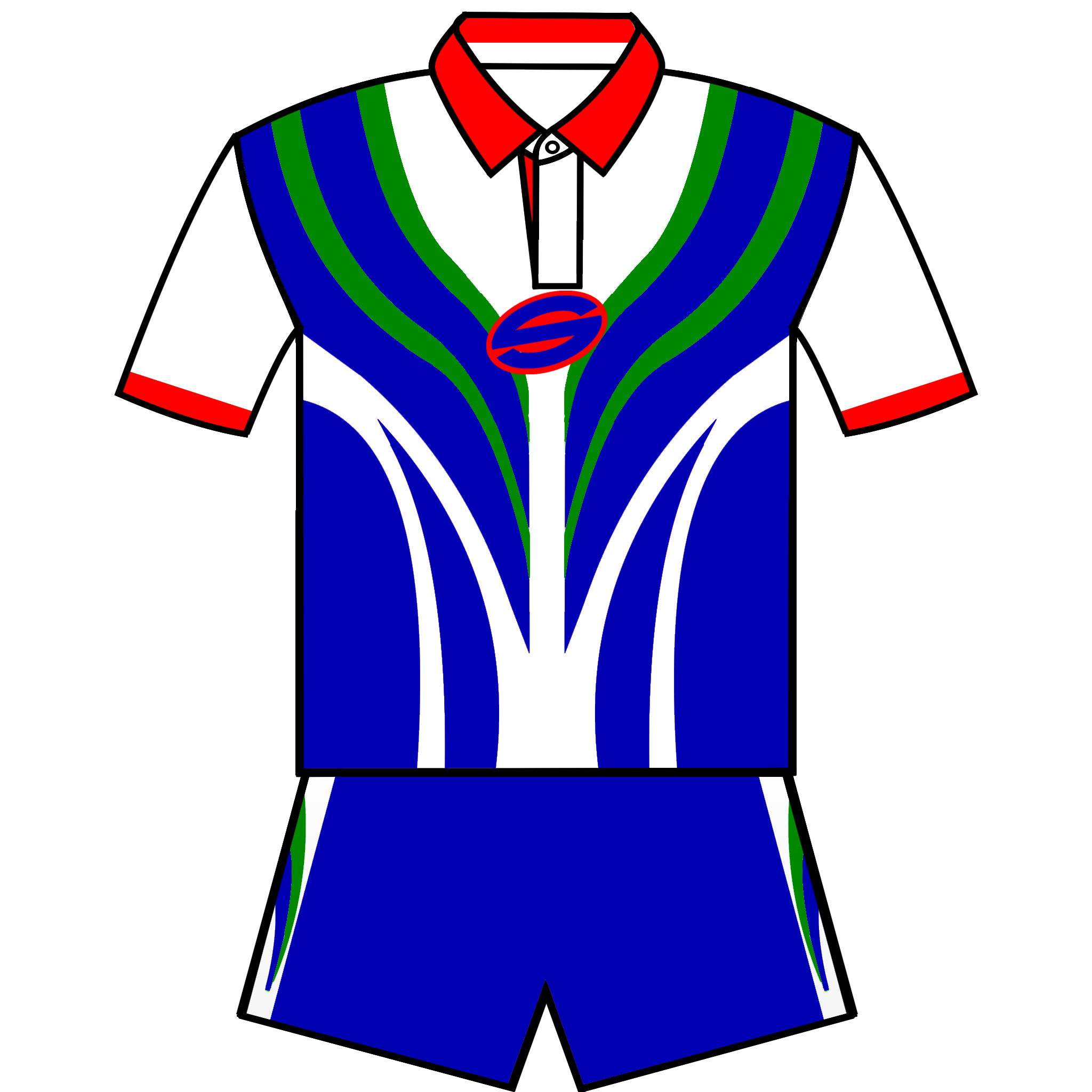
1997–1999

2009–2011

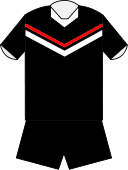
2012–2018

2019–2026

=== Sponsors ===
Year	Kit manufacturer	Major sponsor	Back Top sponsor	Sleeve sponsor	Back Bottom sponsor	Front Shorts sponsor	Back Shorts sponsor	Chest sponsor	
1995	Canterbury	DB Bitter	DB Bitter	Ansett	–	–	–	–	
1996	Canterbury	DB Bitter	DB Bitter		–	–	–	–	
1997	Nike	DB Bitter	–	DB Bitter	–	DB Bitter	–	–	
1998	Nike	DB Bitter	Nike	Bartercard	–	DB Bitter	–	–	
1999	Nike	Vodafone	–	Bartercard	–	DB Bitter	–	–	
2000	Puma	Vodafone	Vodafone	Bartercard	–	–	–	–	
2001	Puma	Vodafone	Vodafone	Lion Red	–	–	–	–	
2002	Puma	Vodafone	Vodafone	Lion Red	–	Electric & Automation Services	–	–	
2003	Puma	Vodafone	Vodafone	Lion Red	–	Electric & Automation Services	Bond & Bond	–	
2004	Puma	Vodafone	Vodafone	Lion Red	–	Bond & Bond		–	
2005	Puma	Vodafone	Vodafone	Lion Red	Konica Minolta	Keno		–	
2006	Puma	Vodafone	Vodafone	Lion Red	Loadlift	Western Union	Konica Minolta	–	
2007	Puma	Vodafone	Vodafone	Lion Red	Loadlift	Western Union	Suzuki	–	
2008	Canterbury	Vodafone	Vodafone	Lion Red	Loadlift	HiFX	Suzuki	–	
2009	Canterbury	Vodafone	Vodafone	Lion Red	Loadlift	HiFX	Suzuki	–	
2010	Canterbury	Vodafone	Vodafone	Lion Red	Loadlift	HiFX	Suzuki	–	
2011	Canterbury	Vodafone	Vodafone	Lion Red	SkyCity	HiFX	Suzuki	–	
2012	Canterbury	Vodafone	Vodafone	Lion Red	SkyCity	HiFX	Wendy's	–	
2013	Canterbury	Vodafone	Vodafone	Lion Red	SkyCity	HiFX	Wendy's	–	
2014	Canterbury	Vodafone	Vodafone	Lion Red	SkyCity	Fernbaby	Wendy's	–	
2015	Canterbury	Vodafone	Vodafone	Woodstock Bourbon	SkyCity	–	Wendy's	–	
2016	Canterbury	Vodafone	Vodafone	Woodstock Bourbon	SkyCity	–	Wendy's	–	
2017	Canterbury	Vodafone	Vodafone	Woodstock Bourbon	SkyCity	Bendon	Wendy's	–	
2018	Canterbury	Vodafone	Vodafone	Woodstock Bourbon	SkyCity	TNT	Wendy's	dtr	
2019	Canterbury	Vodafone	Vodafone	Woodstock Bourbon	Mazda	FedEx	Wendy's	dtr	
2020	Canterbury	Vodafone	Vodafone	Woodstock Bourbon	Mazda	FedEx	Wendy's	dtr	
2021	Canterbury	Vodafone	Vodafone	Sky Sport	Mazda	Autex Acoustics	Wendy's	dtr	
2022	Puma	Vodafone	Vodafone	Sky Sport	Mazda	Autex Acoustics	Wendy's	dtr	
2023	Puma	One NZ	One NZ	Sky Sport	Autex Acoustics	Autex Acoustics	Wendy's	dtr	I AM HOPE
2024	Dynasty Sport	One NZ	One NZ	Sky Sport	Autex Acoustics	Autex Acoustics	Wendy's	Maxigesic	GWM
2025	Dynasty Sport	One NZ	One NZ	Sky Sport	Autex Acoustics	Autex Acoustics	Wendy's	Maxigesic	GWM
2026	Dynasty Sport	One NZ	One NZ	Sky Sport	Autex Acoustics	Autex Acoustics	Wendy's	Maxigesic	GWM

== Individual records and awards ==
* indicates player still active for Warriors

=== Simon Mannering Medal ===
- Called 'Player of the Year' until 2018; named after the club's most capped player, Simon Mannering as of 2019.

Year	Player	Notes
2026	James Fisher-Harris*	
2025	Roger Tuivasa-Sheck	Fourth time awarded
2024	Mitch Barnett	
2023	Shaun Johnson	Also Dally M Halfback of the Year; Also RLPA Players' Champion (RLPA Player of the Year)
2022	Euan Aitken	
2021	Tohu Harris	Second time awarded
2020	Tohu Harris	Also Dally M Second Row of the Year
2019	Roger Tuivasa-Sheck	Third time awarded First player to win three consecutive awards
2018	Roger Tuivasa-Sheck	Second time awarded Also Dally M Medal Winner (NRL Player of the Year)
2017	Roger Tuivasa-Sheck	
2016	Simon Mannering	Fifth time awarded First player to win five awards
2015	Ben Matulino	Second time awarded
2014	Simon Mannering	Fourth time awarded First player to win four awards
2013	Simon Mannering	Third time awarded First player to win three awards
2012	Ben Matulino	
2011	Simon Mannering	Second time awarded
2010	Manu Vatuvei	
2009	Micheal Luck	
2008	Simon Mannering	
2007	Steve Price	Second time awarded First player to win two awards First player to win back to back awards Also Dally M Prop of the Year
2006	Steve Price	
2005	Ruben Wiki	
2004	Wairangi Koopu	
2003	Francis Meli	
2002	Ali Lauiti'iti	Also Dally M Second Row of the Year
2001	Jerry Seuseu	
2000	Robert Mears	
1999	Jason Death	
1998	Joe Vagana	
1997	Stacey Jones	
1996	Stephen Kearney	
1995	Tea Ropati	

=== Rookie of the Year ===
- Named 'Young Player of the Year' until 2013.

Year	Player	Notes
2026	Eddie Ieremia-Toeava*	
2025	Leka Halasima*	
2024	Jacob Laban*	
2023	Taine Tuaupiki*	
2022	Viliami Vailea	
2021	Reece Walsh	Also RLPA Rookie of the Year Award Winner
2020	Jamayne Taunoa-Brown	
2019	Chanel Harris-Tavita*	
2018	Isaiah Papali'i	
2017	Bunty Afoa*	
2016	Nathaniel Roache	
2015	Tuimoala Lolohea	
2014	David Fusitu'a	
2013	Ngani Laumape	
2012	Ben Henry	
2011	Shaun Johnson	
2010	James Maloney	
2009	Russell Packer	

=== Dally M Awards ===
The Dally M Awards are the official annual awards for the National Rugby League competition.

Year	Award	Winner
2026	Coach of the year	Andrew Webster*
2026	Lock of the year	Erin Clark*
2026	Prop of the year	James Fisher-Harris*
2026	Hooker of the year	Wayde Egan*
2026	Captain of the year	James Fisher-Harris*
2025	Lock of the year	Erin Clark*
2024	Prop of the year	Addin Fonua-Blake
2023	Coach of the year	Andrew Webster*
2023	Winger of the year	Dallin Watene-Zelezniak*
2023	Prop of the year	Addin Fonua-Blake
2023	Halfback of the year	Shaun Johnson
2023	VB Hard Earned player of the year	Addin Fonua-Blake
2020	Provan-Summons Medal	New Zealand Warriors
2020	Captain of the year	Roger Tuivasa-Sheck
2020	VB Hard Earned player of the year	Tohu Harris
2020	NRLW Try of the year	Madison Bartlett
2020	Second Row of the year	Tohu Harris
2019	Winger of the year	Ken Maumalo
2018	Ken Irvine Medal	David Fusitu’a
2018	Interchange of the year	Jazz Tevaga
2018	Fullback of the year	Roger Tuivasa-Sheck
2018	Dally M Player of the year	Roger Tuivasa-Sheck
2015	Peter Frilingos Memorial Award	Nathan Friend
2007	Captain of the year	Steve Price
2007	Prop of the year	Steve Price
2002	Second Row of the year	Ali Lauiti'iti
2002	Coach of the year	Daniel Anderson
1995	Winger of the year	Sean Hoppe

=== Most games ===
Rank	Games	Player	Career
1	301	Simon Mannering	2005–2018
2	261	Stacey Jones	1995–2005, 2009
3	226	Manu Vatuvei	2004–2017
4	220	Shaun Johnson	2011–2018, 2022–2024
5	212	Ben Matulino	2008–2017
6	195	Logan Swann	1997–2008
7	188	Jacob Lillyman	2009–2017
8	185	Lance Hohaia	2002–2011
9	175	Awen Guttenbeil	1996–2006
10	173	Sam Rapira	2006–2015

=== Most tries ===
Rank	Tries	Player	Career
1	152	Manu Vatuvei	2004–2017
2	83	Dallin Watene-Zelezniak	2021-
3	82	Stacey Jones	1995–2005, 2009
4	79	Shaun Johnson	2011–2018, 2022–2024
5	63	Simon Mannering	2005–2018
6	61	David Fusitu'a	2014–2021
7	60	Francis Meli	1998–2005
T-8	57	Clinton Toopi	1999–2006
T-8	57	Lance Hohaia	2002–2011
10	54	Jerome Ropati	2003–2014

=== Most tries in a season ===
Rank	Tries	Player	Season
1	24	Dallin Watene-Zelezniak	2023 (Including 3 Finals Matches)
T-2	23	Francis Meli	2003 (Including 3 Finals Matches)
T-2	23	David Fusitu'a	2018 (Including 1 Finals Match)
T-4	20	Manu Vatuvei	2010 (Including 1 Finals Match)
T-4	20	Dallin Watene-Zelezniak	2026

=== Most points ===
Points	Player	Career
1,213	Shaun Johnson	2011–2018, 2022–2024
694	Stacey Jones	1995–2005, 2009
608	Manu Vatuvei	2004–2017
547	James Maloney	2010–2012
439	Ivan Cleary	2000–2002
357	Lance Hohaia	2002–2011
340	Matthew Ridge	1997–1999
337	Gene Ngamu	1995–1999
332	Dallin Watene-Zelezniak	2021–
291	Michael Witt	2007–2009

=== Most points in a season ===
Rank	Points	Player	Season
1	242	Ivan Cleary	2002
2	188	James Maloney	2010
3	180	James Maloney	2011
4	177	Shaun Johnson	2013
5	176	Shaun Johnson	2023

=== Most points in a match ===
Points	Player	Details
28	Gene Ngamu	3 tries, 8 goals vs North Queensland, 1996 (Won 52–6)
28	Ivan Cleary	1 try, 12 goals vs Northern Eagles, 2002 (Won 68–10)
28	James Maloney	3 tries, 8 goals vs Brisbane Broncos, 2010 (Won 48–16)
26	Shaun Johnson	3 tries, 7 goals vs Canberra Raiders, 2013 (Won 50–16)
26	Shaun Johnson	2 tries, 9 goals vs Canberra Raiders, 2014 (Won 54–12)

== Club records ==
=== Biggest wins ===
	Margin	Score	Opponent	Venue	Year
1	66	66–0	South Sydney Rabbitohs	Stadium Australia	2006
2	58	68–10	Northern Eagles	Mount Smart Stadium	2002
3	48	48–0	Parramatta Eels	Mount Smart Stadium	2014
4	46	52–6	North Queensland Cowboys	Mount Smart Stadium	1996
T-5	44	60–16	Western Suburbs Magpies	Campbelltown Stadium	1999
T-5	44	52–8	Penrith Panthers	Mount Smart Stadium	2001

=== Biggest losses ===
	Margin	Score	Opponent	Venue	Year
T-1	60	10–70	Melbourne Storm	Melbourne Rectangular Stadium	2022
T-1	60	6–66	Gold Coast Titans	Robina Stadium	2024
2	56	6–62	Penrith Panthers	Penrith Stadium	2013
3	54	0–54	St. George Illawarra Dragons	Wollongong Showground	2000
4	52	6–58	Sydney Roosters	Sydney Football Stadium	2004
T-5	46	10–56	Melbourne Storm	Olympic Park Stadium	2000
T-5	46	6–52	Manly Warringah Sea Eagles	Brookvale Oval	2008
T-5	46	4–50	Wests Tigers	Lancaster Park	2004

=== Kept opposition to nil ===
Score	Opponent	Venue	Year
66–0	South Sydney Rabbitohs	Stadium Australia	2006
48–0	Parramatta Eels	Mount Smart Stadium	2014
42–0	Newcastle Knights	Mount Smart Stadium	1999
42–0	Gold Coast Titans	Mount Smart Stadium	2014
30–0	Cronulla-Sutherland Sharks	Mount Smart Stadium	2001
26–0	North Queensland Cowboys	Mount Smart Stadium	2006
18–0	St. George Illawarra Dragons	Central Coast Stadium	2020
14–0	Wests Tigers	Mount Smart Stadium	2009
13–0	Newcastle Knights	Mount Smart Stadium	2009

=== Kept to nil ===
Score	Opponent	Venue	Year
0–54	St. George Illawarra Dragons	Wollongong Showground	2000
0–44	Sydney Roosters	Sydney Football Stadium	2002
0–44	Gold Coast Titans	Robina Stadium	2021
0–42	Melbourne Storm	Melbourne Rectangular Stadium	2016
0–36	St. George Illawarra Dragons	Wellington Regional Stadium	2015
0–32	Sydney Roosters	Mount Smart Stadium	2018
0–26	Penrith Panthers	Campbelltown Stadium	2020
0–24	North Queensland Cowboys	Mount Smart Stadium	1999
0–24	Sydney Roosters	Sydney Football Stadium	2015
0–20	Newcastle Knights	Hunter Stadium	2020
0–14	Sydney Roosters	Mount Smart Stadium	2023

=== Most consecutive wins/losses ===
Wins	First round	Last round
8	Round 7, 2002	Round 14, 2002
7	Round 19, 2023	Round 26, 2023

Losses	First round	Last round
11	Round 19, 2012	Round 3, 2013
11	Round 19, 2015	Round 3, 2016

=== Most consecutive home wins/losses ===
Wins	First round	Last round
7	Round 18, 2008	Round 1, 2009

Losses	First round	Last round
6	Round 24, 1998	Round 9, 1999

=== Most consecutive away wins/losses ===
Wins	First round	Last round
5	Round 8, 2002	Round 16, 2002
5	Round 11, 2023	Round 23, 2023

Losses	First round	Last round
12	Round 6, 2022	Round 2, 2023

=== Biggest comeback ===
Recovered from a 21-point deficit.

- Trailed Canberra Raiders 31–10 after 51 minutes to win 34–31 at Canberra Stadium on 27 March 2021

Recovered from a 20-point deficit.

- Trailed Newcastle Knights 20–0 after 29 minutes to win 30–26 at Hunter Stadium on 17 April 2005
- Trailed Cronulla-Sutherland Sharks 26–6 after 28 minutes to win 32–30 at Shark Park on 2 April 2023

Recovered from a 18-point deficit.

- Trailed Cronulla-Sutherland Sharks 22–4 after 47 minutes to win 30–28 at Shark Park on 31 August 2024

Recovered from a 16-point deficit.

- Trailed Canterbury-Bankstown Bulldogs 24–8 after 75 minutes to tie 24–24 at Wellington Regional Stadium on 7 April 2001

Recovered from a 16-point deficit.

- Trailed Manly Warringah Sea Eagles 16–0 after 35 minutes to tie 22–22 at Mount Smart Stadium on 13 April 2024

=== Worst collapse ===
Surrendered a 26-point lead.

- Led Penrith Panthers 32–6 after 59 minutes to draw 32–32 at Penrith Stadium on 1 August 2009

Surrendered an 18-point lead (three-times).

- Led Wests Tigers 22–4 after 64 minutes to lose 26–22 at Mount Smart Stadium on 12 June 2011
- Led Newcastle Knights 18–0 after 16 minutes to lose 24–19 at Mount Smart Stadium on 21 July 2012
- Led Manly Warringah Sea Eagles 18–0 after 31 minutes to lose 24–22 at Subiaco Oval on 28 July 2012

Surrendered a 16-point lead (three-times).

- Led Newcastle Knights 16–0 after 34 minutes to lose 36–26 at Mount Smart Stadium on 16 March 2003
- Led Canterbury Bulldogs 16–0 after 21 minutes to lose 22–18 (in extra-time) at Stadium Australia on 9 July 2006
- Led Canberra Raiders 22–6 after 45 minutes to lose 22–42 at Mount Smart Stadium on 2 September 2012

=== Golden Point record ===
Result	Score	Opponent	Round
Win	31–30	South Sydney Rabbitohs	Round 16, 2003
Loss	26–28	North Queensland Cowboys	Round 15, 2004
Loss	29–30	Canberra Raiders	Round 20, 2004
Loss	18–22	Canterbury-Bankstown Bulldogs	Round 18, 2006
Draw	31–31	Sydney Roosters	Round 21, 2007
Win	17–16	Sydney Roosters	Round 6, 2009
Draw	14–14	Melbourne Storm	Round 7, 2009
Draw	32–32	Penrith Panthers	Round 21, 2009
Win	17–13	Parramatta Eels	Round 10, 2015
Win	32–28	Sydney Roosters	Round 5, 2016
Loss	18–19	Cronulla-Sutherland Sharks	Round 16, 2016
Loss	21–22	Manly Warringah Sea Eagles	Round 25, 2017
Draw	18–18	Brisbane Broncos	Round 17, 2019
Win	25–24	North Queensland Cowboys	Round 5, 2022
Win	21–20	Canberra Raiders	Round 8, 2022
Loss	26–27	Gold Coast Titans	Round 25, 2022
Win	21–20	Canberra Raiders	Round 21, 2023
Draw	22–22	Manly Warringah Sea Eagles	Round 6, 2024
Loss	12–13	Canterbury-Bankstown Bulldogs	Round 18, 2024
Loss	32–34	Dolphins	Round 23, 2024
Win	20–18	Brisbane Broncos	Round 7, 2025

=== Largest home attendances ===
Largest attendances at the four venues used as home grounds.

	Attendance	Venue	Opponent	Round	Year
1	48,511	Eden Park	Newcastle Knights	Semi-Final	2026
2	38,405	Eden Park	Parramatta Eels	Round 1	2011
3	32,740	Eden Park	Manly Warringah Sea Eagles	Round 1	2012
4	32,174	Mount Smart Stadium	Illawarra Steelers	Round 6	1995
T-5	30,112	Mount Smart Stadium	Manly Warringah Sea Eagles	Round 5	1995
T-5	30,112	Wellington Regional Stadium	Canterbury-Bankstown Bulldogs	Round 9	2013

== Head-to-head records ==
Opponent	Played	Won	Drawn	Lost	Points Differential	Win %
Titans	37	22	0	15	89	59.5%
Tigers	40	23	0	17	−6	57.5%
Cowboys	49	27	0	22	36	55.1%
Rabbitohs	42	21	0	21	76	50.0%
Dolphins	6	3	0	3	2	50.0%
Roosters	49	24	1	24	−255	49.0%
Knights	54	28	1	25	97	49.0%
Raiders	55	26	0	29	−72	47.3%
Bulldogs	46	20	2	24	53	43.5%
Broncos	51	22	1	28	−82	43.1%
Sharks	52	22	0	30	−142	42.1%
Eels	46	19	0	27	−21	41.3%
Dragons	39	14	0	25	−213	35.9%
Panthers	54	19	1	34	−296	35.2%
Sea Eagles	44	14	1	29	−216	31.8%
Storm	54	17	2	35	−535	31.5%

== Women's team ==
In December 2017, the New Zealand Warriors expressed their interest in applying for a licence to participate in the inaugural NRL Women's Premiership. In March 2018, they were awarded one of four licences for the league's inaugural season, to commence in September of the same year. Luisa Avaiki was named the coach of the side.

The team competed in, and finished 3rd place in both the 2018 and 2019 seasons, the latter of which included the first ever standalone NRLW match held at Mount Smart Stadium.

In the 2020 season, because of COVID-19, the team was forced to field a side which only included five players from the previous season, with the rest of the team being Australian players. The team was coached by Jillaroos coach, Brad Donald. The side came in third place (from four) for the third consecutive year.

In June 2021, CEO Cameron George announced the team would not compete in the 2021 competition but plan to re-enter the competition in 2022. This did not eventuate, however, with the NRL announcing NRLW expansion to 10 teams for the 2023 season that did not include the Warriors.

In August 2022, during a members-only meeting with CEO Cameron George, owner Mark Robinson, coach Stacey Jones, and captain Tohu Harris, their intention to re-enter the competition for the 2025 season was announced.

On 28 March 2024, NRL CEO Andrew Abdo announced the Warriors would rejoin the NRLW, along with a Canterbury Bulldogs team, in an expanded 12-team competition from 2025.

=== Women's head-to-head records ===
Opponent	Played	Won	Drawn	Lost	Win %
Titans	2	0	0	2	0
Tigers	2	1	0	1	50
Cowboys	2	2	0	0	100
Raiders	2	0	0	2	0
Knights	2	1	0	1	50
Roosters	5	2	0	3	40
Bulldogs	2	2	0	0	100
Eels	2	2	0	0	100
Broncos	5	1	0	4	20
Sharks	2	0	0	2	0
Dragons	5	1	0	4	20

== See also ==
- Rugby league in New Zealand
- List of New Zealand Warriors players
- New Zealand Warriors Women
