= Gene Ngamu =

New Zealand international rugby league footballer

Personal information
- Full name: Gene Robert Ngamu
- Born: 27 January 1974 (age 52) New Zealand

Playing information
- Height: 178 cm (5 ft 10 in)
- Weight: 78 kg (12 st 4 lb)
- Position: Five-eighth, Halfback
Club
Years	Team	Pld	T	G	FG	P
19??–91	Marist Saints
1992–93	Manly Sea Eagles	9	1	0	0	4
1994	South Sydney	1	0	0	0	0
1995–99	Auckland Warriors	81	11	118	3	283
1999–00	Huddersfield-Sheffield	32	9	67	0	170
	Total	123	21	185	3	457
Representative
Years	Team	Pld	T	G	FG	P
1993–99	New Zealand	25	11	8	1	61
2000	Aotearoa Māori	2	0	3	1	7

Gene Robert Ngamu (born 27 January 1974) is a New Zealand former rugby league footballer. He played mainly as a halfback or five-eighth, and is probably best known for his combination with Stacey Jones at the Auckland Warriors and the Kiwis.

== Early years ==
Ngamu started his career at the Marist Saints and Northcote Tigers in the Auckland Rugby League competition. He joined the Tigers in the 1992 pre-season while on a scholarship with the Manly-Warringah Sea Eagles, however was called to Sydney full-time before the season began.

== Australian competition ==
In 1992, he moved to Sydney, signing with the Manly-Warringah Sea Eagles on a two-year deal. He made the Junior Kiwis in 1992.

In 1994, he joined South Sydney but could not break into the first-grade side.

He returned home in 1995 to join the new Auckland Warriors franchise, playing in the inaugural run on side. A goalkicker, Ngamu holds the record for Most Points in a Match for the Auckland Warriors, a feat only equaled by Ivan Cleary and James Maloney. He stayed with the Warriors until the 1999 season, when he left for England. Ngamu was selected for the New Zealand team to compete in the end of season 1999 Rugby League Tri-Nations tournament. In the final against Australia he played from the interchange bench in the Kiwis' 22-20 loss.

== England ==
Ngamu had an unhappy two seasons with the Huddersfield-Sheffield joint franchise before leaving England.

== Representative career ==
Ngamu made his international début for the New Zealand national rugby league team in 1993, one year after his Junior Kiwis debut.

He played in two World Cups, representing the Kiwis in 1995 and the Aotearoa Māori in 2000.

== Later years ==
Ngamu then joined a rugby union club in Manly before retiring from professional football. In 2005 he played for the North Harbour Dolphins in the Phelan Shield before being called into the North Harbour Tigers team mid way through the 2005 Bartercard Cup. Gene then retired with his wife Fiona and had a family.
