= Niko Kirwan =

New Zealand footballer

Personal information
- Full name: Niko Mario Patrick Kirwan
- Date of birth: 4 September 1995 (age 31)
- Place of birth: Auckland, New Zealand
- Height: 1.86 m (6 ft 1 in)
- Position: Midfielder

Team information
- Current team: Potenza
- Number: 26

Youth career
- Auckland City
- Waitakere United

Senior career*
Years	Team	Apps	(Gls)
2016–2017	Team Wellington	18	(1)
2017–2018	Mestre	21	(0)
2018–2019	Reggina	35	(1)
2019–2021	Reggiana	50	(0)
2021–2025	Padova	102	(6)
2025–2026	Trapani	21	(1)
2026–	Potenza	9	(1)

International career^{‡}
2021–	New Zealand	10	(1)
- * Club domestic league appearances and goals as of 1 May 2026 ‡ National team caps and goals as of 4 July 2024

Niko Mario Patrick Kirwan (born 4 September 1995) is a New Zealand professional footballer who plays as a midfielder for Serie C Group C club Potenza and the New Zealand national team.

== Club career ==
=== Team Wellington ===
Kirwan signed to play for Team Wellington in the New Zealand Football Championship for the 2016–2017 season.

=== Mestre ===
On 28 July 2017, Kirwan signed a one-year deal with Mestre, who play in Serie C.

=== Reggina ===
On 8 July 2018, Kirwan signed a one-year deal with an option for a further two with Reggina, who play in Serie C.

=== Reggiana ===
On 16 August 2019, he signed a two-year contract with Reggiana.

=== Padova ===
Kirwan signed with Serie C side Padova in 2021.

=== Trapani ===
On 3 July 2025, Kirwan moved to Trapani, also in Serie C.

== International career ==
On 15 March 2018, Kirwan was called up for the New Zealand national football team as part of its 24-man squad for their friendly against Canada.

He made his international debut with New Zealand in a 2–1 friendly win over Curaçao on 9 October 2021. He scored his first international goal three days later, a late winner against Bahrain.

== Career statistics ==
=== Club ===
Club	Season	League			Coppa Italia		Continental		Other		Total	
Club	Season	Division	Apps	Goals	Apps	Goals	Apps	Goals	Apps	Goals	Apps	Goals
Team Wellington	2016–17	Premiership	16	1	—		7 (Note: Appearance in OFC Champions League)	0	2 (Note: Appearances in New Zealand Football Championship play-offs)	0	25	1
Mestre	2017–18	Serie C	22	0	—		—		0	0	22	0
Reggina 1914	2018–19	Serie C	34	1	2	0	—		4 (Note: Two appearances in Coppa Italia Serie C; two appearances in Serie C Promotion play-offs)	0	38	1
Reggiana 1919	2019–20	Serie C	23	0	—		—		1 (Note: Appearance in Serie C Promotion play-offs)	0	24	0
Reggiana 1919	2020–21	Serie B	23	0	0	0	—		—		24	0
Reggiana 1919	Total		46	0	0	0	0	0	1	0	47	0
Padova	2021–22	Serie C	30	4	1	0	—		10 (Note: Six appearances, one goal in Coppa Italia Serie C; four appearances in Serie C Promotion play-offs)	1	41	5
Padova	2022–23	Serie C	2	0	1	0	—		1	0	4	0
Padova	2023–24	Serie C	31	1	—		—		7 (Note: Appearance in Coppa Italia Serie C)	1	38	2
Padova	2024–25	Serie C	32	1	1	0	—		4 (Note: Two appearances in Coppa Italia Serie C; two appearances in Supercoppa di Serie C)	0	37	1
Padova	Total		95	6	3	0	0	0	22	2	120	8
Trapani 1905	2025–26	Serie C	21	1	—		—		2	0	23	1
Potenza	2025–26	Serie C	9	1	—		—		5 (Note: Three appearances in Coppa Italia Serie C; two appearances in Serie C Promotion play-offs)	0	14	1
Potenza	2026–27	Serie C	2	1	1	0	—		0	0	3	1
Potenza	Total		11	2	1	0	0	0	5	0	17	2
Career total			245	11	6	0	7	0	36	2	291	13

=== International ===
List of international goals scored by Niko Kirwan
No.	Date	Venue	Opponent	Score	Result	Competition
1.	12 October 2021	Bahrain National Stadium, Riffa, Bahrain	Bahrain	1–0	1–0	Friendly

== Personal life ==
Kirwan is the son of New Zealand All Black Sir John Kirwan. He lived in Italy for 10 years which is where he got his love of football from and learnt Italian. He is of Italian descent through his mother Fiorella. He also holds Italian citizenship.

== Honours ==
=== Club ===
Team Wellington

- New Zealand Football Championship Premiers: 2016–17
- OFC Champions League Runner Up: 2017
