= 2026 Brisbane Broncos season =

NRL rugby league season

- Play-off result: DNQ
- World Club Challenge: Lost (Hull KR 30-24).
- 2026 record: Wins: 8; losses: 17
- Points scored: For: 471; against: 677 (Rd 27)

Team information
- CEO: Dave Donaghy
- Head Coach: Michael Maguire
- Captain: Adam Reynolds
- Stadium: Suncorp Stadium
- Avg. attendance: 43,764
- Agg. attendance: 218,820
- High attendance: 50,188 (Dolphins, 8 August)
- Low attendance: 39,015 (Parramatta Eels, 12 March)

Top scorers
- Tries: Kotoni Staggs (7)
- Goals: Adam Reynolds (20)
- Points: Adam Reynolds (45)
Home colours	Away colours
← 2025	List of seasons	2027 →

The 2026 Brisbane Broncos season was the 39th in the club's history. Coached by Michael Maguire and captained by Adam Reynolds, the Broncos entered the 2026 National Rugby League (NRL) season in Australia as the defending premiers. The club finished 14th on the table, with its title defence described as one of the worst in the modern era of rugby league.

In February, they were defeated 30–24 by Hull Kingston Rovers in England in the 2026 World Club Challenge. During the NRL regular season, the Broncos lost a total of seventeen matches including eight consecutive, and did not qualify for the finals.

== Season summary ==
=== Pre-season ===
During the off-season, the Brisbane Broncos unveiled a new club logo and updated playing kit. In February, team captain Adam Reynolds announced that the 2026 season would be his last in the NRL. Separately, forward Payne Haas informed the club of his intention to leave at the end of the season.

=== World Club Challenge ===
In February, Brisbane travelled to England to play Hull Kingston Rovers in the 2026 World Club Challenge at MKM Stadium in Hull. Brisbane lost 30-24.

=== Regular season ===
The Broncos began their premiership defence with a heavy 26–0 loss to the Penrith Panthers in Round 1, before suffering a second consecutive defeat in a high-scoring match against the Parramatta Eels. They responded with back-to-back victories over the Melbourne Storm and Dolphins, before further wins against the Gold Coast Titans and Wests Tigers lifted their record to four wins from seven matches. Despite these results, inconsistency remained a feature of Brisbane's early campaign, highlighted by a narrow loss to the North Queensland Cowboys. Injuries to several key players, including Reece Walsh and Payne Haas, disrupted team continuity during this period. By the end of the season, the Broncos won eight of twenty-four matches. They did not qualify for the finals.

== Squad information ==
As of Round 11

Cap.	Nat.	Player	Position	Broncos debut	Previous First Grade RL club
170	(Australia)	Ben Hunt	Hooker	2009	(Australia) St. George Illawarra Dragons
236	(Samoa)	Payne Haas	Prop	2018	—N/a
238	(Australia)	Kotoni Staggs	Centre	2018	—N/a
241	(Australia)	Gehamat Shibasaki	Centre	2018	—N/a
244	(Australia)	Patrick Carrigan	Lock	2019	—N/a
254	(New Zealand)	Jesse Arthars	Wing	2020	(Australia) Gold Coast Titans
259	(Australia)	Cory Paix	Hooker	2020	—N/a
262	(New Zealand)	Jordan Riki	Second-row	2020	—N/a
269	(New Zealand)	Xavier Willison	Prop	2021	—N/a
270	(Australia)	Brendan Piakura	Second-row	2021	—N/a
272	(Australia)	Billy Walters	Hooker	2022	(Australia) Wests Tigers
275	(Australia)	Adam Reynolds (c)	Halfback	2022	(Australia) South Sydney Rabbitohs
276	(Australia)	Corey Jensen	Prop	2022	(Australia) North Queensland Cowboys
278	(Tonga)	Delouise Hoeter	Centre	2022	(Australia) Wests Tigers
280	(Australia)	Ezra Mam	Five-eighth	2022	—N/a
283	(Samoa)	Deine Mariner	Wing	2022	—N/a
285	(Australia)	Reece Walsh	Fullback	2023	New Zealand Warriors
289	(Australia)	Blake Mozer	Hooker	2023	—N/a
290	(Australia)	Josh Rogers	Hooker	2023	—N/a
292	(Australia)	Jaiyden Hunt	Second-row	2024	(Australia) St. George Illawarra Dragons
293	(Australia)	Ben Te Kura	Prop	2024	—N/a
294	(Australia)	Jack Gosiewski	Second-row	2024	(Australia) North Queensland Cowboys
295	(New Zealand)	Josiah Karapani	Wing	2024	—N/a
296	(Australia)	Ben Talty	Prop	2025	—N/a
297	(New Zealand)	Aublix Tawha	Prop	2026	(Australia) Dolphins
298	(Australia)	Grant Anderson	Wing	2026	(Australia) Melbourne Storm
299	(New Zealand)	Antonio Verhoeven	Wing	2026	—N/a
300	(Australia)	Tom Duffy	Halfback	2026	(Australia) North Queensland Cowboys
301	(Australia)	Cameron Bukowski	Hooker	2026	—N/a
302	(New Zealand)	Hayze Perham	Fullback	2026	(Australia) Canterbury-Bankstown Bulldogs
303	(New Zealand)	Preston Riki	Prop	2026	(Australia) Penrith Panthers
304	(Australia)	Va'a Semu	Prop	2026	—N/a
305	(Australia)	Phillip Coates	Wing	2026	—N/a
—	(Australia)	Kane Bradley	Wing	Yet to debut	(Australia) Melbourne Storm
—	(Australia)	Tupou Francis	Lock	Yet to debut	—N/a
—	(Australia)	Luke Gale	Second-row	Yet to debut	—N/a
—	(Australia)	Jared Horne	Lock	Yet to debut	—N/a
—	(Australia)	Braithen Scott	Halfback	Yet to debut	—N/a

== Squad changes ==
=== Transfers in ===
Date	Position	Player	From	Year/s	Ref.
25 June 2025	Wing	Grant Anderson	Melbourne Storm	2 Years	
20 August 2025	Halfback	Tom Duffy	North Queensland Cowboys	1 Year	
14 October 2025	Prop	Aublix Tawha	Dolphins	2 Years	

=== Transfers out ===
Date	Position	Player	To	Year/s	Ref.
28 February 2025	Hooker	Tyson Smoothy	Wakefield Trinity	3 Years	
27 June 2025	Wing	Selwyn Cobbo	Dolphins	1 Year	
25 July 2025	Halfback	Jock Madden	Wests Tigers	2 Years	
22 September 2025	Wing	Israel Leota	Moana Pasifika	2 Years	
9 October 2025	Lock	Kobe Hetherington	Manly Warringah Sea Eagles	4 Years	
10 November 2025	Prop	Fletcher Baker	Canterbury-Bankstown Bulldogs	1 Year	
2 December 2025	Halfback	Coby Black	Canberra Raiders	3 Years	

== Coaching staff ==
Name	Position	Ref.
Michael Maguire	Head coach	
Matt Ballin	Assistant Coach	
Trent Barrett	Assistant Coach	
Adam Brideson	Development & Transition	
Cameron Smith	Mentor	
Dave Ballard	Head of Performance	
Mark Henry	Head of Physical Preparation	
Nick Murray	Performance & Data Insights Manager	
Nicholas Berlin	Performance Dietitian	
Troy Thomson	General Manager - Football Operations	
Simon Scanlan	General Manager - Recruitment & Pathways	

== World Club Challenge ==
Brisbane lost 24-30 to the 2025 Super League champions Hull Kingston Rovers in the 2026 World Club Challenge at MKM Stadium, England.

Date & time	Opponent	H/A	Venue	Result	BRI	OPP	Tries	Goals	Attendance	TV	Report
20 February, 5:30 (AEST)	Hull Kingston Rovers	A	MKM Stadium	Lost	24	30	Gehamat Shibasaki (2), Patrick Carrigan, Deine Mariner, Kotoni Staggs	Adam Reynolds (2/5)	24,600	Fox League	

Brisbane did not participate in the 2026 NRL Pre-season Challenge as they were in the United Kingdom contesting the 2026 World Club Challenge.

== Regular season ==
=== Ladder ===
Pos	Team	Pld	W	D	L	B	PF	PA	PD	Pts	Qualification
1	Penrith Panthers	24	18	0	6	3	683	347	+336	42	Advance to finals series
2	New Zealand Warriors	24	18	0	6	3	728	418	+310	42	Advance to finals series
3	Dolphins	24	17	0	7	3	662	506	+156	40	Advance to finals series
4	Sydney Roosters (P)	24	16	0	8	3	619	501	+118	38	Advance to finals series
5	Cronulla-Sutherland Sharks	24	14	0	10	3	672	523	+149	34	Advance to finals series
6	South Sydney Rabbitohs	24	14	0	10	3	694	581	+113	34	Advance to finals series
7	Newcastle Knights	24	14	0	10	3	633	591	+42	34	Advance to finals series
8	North Queensland Cowboys	24	13	0	11	3	568	652	−84	32	Advance to finals series
9	Manly Warringah Sea Eagles	24	11	0	13	3	623	524	+99	28	
10	Melbourne Storm	24	11	0	13	3	594	576	+18	28	
11	Canberra Raiders	24	11	0	13	3	581	626	−45	28	
12	Canterbury-Bankstown Bulldogs	24	11	0	13	3	476	536	−60	28	
13	Parramatta Eels	24	9	0	15	3	497	678	−181	24	
14	Brisbane Broncos	24	8	0	16	3	471	677	−206	22	
15	Wests Tigers	24	8	0	16	3	445	699	−254	22	
16	Gold Coast Titans	24	6	0	18	3	477	663	−186	18	
17	St. George Illawarra Dragons	24	5	0	19	3	392	717	−325	16	

Source: National Rugby League
Rules for classification: 1) competition points; 2) points differential; 3) percentage; (Note: Greater percentage of points scored for and against, being determined by points scored for divided by points scored against expressed as a percentage.) 4) tries scored; (Note: Further tiebreakers (in order) include goals scored, field goals kicked; least amount of penalties conceded.)
(P) Premiers

=== Result by round ===
Round	1	2	3	4	5	6	7	8	9	10	11	12	13	14	15	16	17	18	19	20	21	22	23	24	25	26	27
Ground	H	H	A	H	A	H	A	H	A	A	A	–	H	H	A	–	H	H	–	A	A	H	A	H	A	H	A
Result	L	L	W	W	W	L	W	W	L	L	L	B	L	L	L	B	L	L	B	W	L	L	L	L	W	L	W
Position	15	15	13	10	8	11	9	7	9	11	11	11	11	12	14	13	13	16	14	13	14	15	16	16	15	15	14
Points	0	0	2	4	6	6	8	10	10	10	10	12	12	12	12	14	14	14	16	18	18	18	18	18	20	20	22

Source: National Rugby League
A = Away; H = Home; N = Neutral; B = Bye; W = Win; D = Draw; L = Loss

=== Matches ===
As of Round 26

Date	Rd	Opponent	H/A	Venue	Result	BRI	OPP	Tries	Goals	Field goals	Ref
6 March	1	Penrith Panthers	H	Suncorp Stadium	Lost	0	26	N/A	N/A	N/A	
12 March	2	Parramatta Eels	H	Suncorp Stadium	Lost	32	40	Reece Walsh (2), Kotoni Staggs (2), Payne Haas	Adam Reynolds (5/5)	N/A	
20 March	3	Melbourne Storm	A	AAMI Park	Won	18	14	Jordan Riki (2), Kotoni Staggs	Reece Walsh (3/3)	N/A	
27 March	4	Dolphins	H	Suncorp Stadium	Won	26	12	Kotoni Staggs (2), Adam Reynolds, Reece Walsh, Gehamat Shibasaki	Adam Reynolds (3/5)	N/A	
4 April	5	Gold Coast Titans	A	Cbus Super Stadium	Won	26	12	Reece Walsh, Xavier Willison, Gehamat Shibasaki, Jesse Arthars, Ezra Mam	Adam Reynolds (1/1), Kotoni Staggs (1/4), PG: Reece Walsh (1/1)	N/A	
10 April	6	North Queensland Cowboys	H	Suncorp Stadium	Lost	31	35	Kotoni Staggs, Josiah Karapani, Jesse Arthars, Ezra Mam, Ben Talty	Thomas Duffy (5/5)	Thomas Duffy (1/1)	
18 April	7	Wests Tigers	A	Campbelltown Sports Stadium	Won	21	20	Josiah Karapani, Deine Mariner, Ben Talty	Adam Reynolds (3/3)	Adam Reynolds (1/1)	
24 April	8	Canterbury-Bankstown Bulldogs	H	Suncorp Stadium	Won	32	12	Gehamat Shibasaki, Josiah Karapani, Deine Mariner, Cory Paix, Ezra Mam, Xavier Willison	Adam Reynolds (3/6), PG: Adam Reynolds (1/1)	Adam Reynolds (0/1)	
2 May	9	Sydney Roosters	A	Allianz Stadium	Lost	24	38	Reece Walsh, Xavier Willison, Patrick Carrigan, Jordan Riki	Thomas Duffy (4/4)	N/A	
9 May	10	Manly Warringah Sea Eagles	A	4 Pines Park	Lost	4	32	Antonio Verhoeven	Reece Walsh (0/1)	N/A	
17 May	11	New Zealand Warriors	H	Suncorp Stadium	Lost	12	42	Adam Reynolds (2)	Adam Reynolds (2/2)	N/A	
24 May	12	Bye									
31 May	13	St. George Illawarra Dragons	H	Suncorp Stadium	Lost	24	30	Jesse Arthars (2), Josiah Karapani, Xavier Willison	Adam Reynolds (4/4) PG: Adam Reynolds (1/1)	N/A	
6 June	14	Gold Coast Titans	H	Suncorp Stadium	Lost	23	28	Brendan Piakura, Kotoni Staggs, Jesse Arthars, Grant Anderson	Adam Reynolds (3/4)	Adam Reynolds (1/1)	
11 June	15	South Sydney Rabbitohs	A	Accor Stadium	Lost	6	48	Josiah Karapani	Adam Reynolds	N/A	
18 June	16	Bye									
26 June	17	Sydney Roosters	H	Suncorp Stadium	Lost	18	24	Thomas Duffy, Brendan Piakura, Grant Anderson	Thomas Duffy (2/3) PG: Thomas Duffy (1/1)	N/A	
4 July	18	Cronulla Sharks	H	Suncorp Stadium	Lost	16	28	Cory Paix, Hayze Perham, Deine Mariner	Thomas Duffy (2/3)	N/A	
11 July	19	Bye									
16 July	20	Penrith Panthers	A	CommBank Stadium	Won	14	12	Jordan Riki, Kotoni Staggs, Josiah Karapani	Reece Walsh (1/3)	N/A	
25 July	21	North Queensland Cowboys	A	Queensland Country Bank Stadium	Lost	10	18	Xavier Willison, Ezra Mam	Adam Reynolds (1/2)	N/A	
1 August	22	Newcastle Knights	H	Suncorp Stadium	Lost	6	30	Reece Walsh	Reece Walsh (1/1)	N/A	
8 August	23	Dolphins	A	Suncorp Stadium	Lost	23	40	Ezra Mam (3), Deine Mariner, Xavier Willison	Reece Walsh (5/5) PG: Reece Walsh (1/1)	N/A	
15 August	24	New Zealand Warriors	H	Suncorp Stadium	Lost	6	40	Xavier Willison	Thomas Duffy (1/1)	N/A	
21 August	25	Canberra Raiders	A	GIO Stadium	Won	34	30	Grant Anderson (2), Billy Walters, Ezra Mam, Payne Haas, Hayze Perham	Hayze Perham (5/6)	N/A	
27 August	26	Melbourne Storm	H	Suncorp Stadium	Lost	20	46	Ezra Mam (2), Kotoni Staggs, Ben Hunt	Hayze Perham (2/4)	N/A	
3 September	27	Canterbury-Bankstown Bulldogs	A	Accor Stadium	Won						

=== NRL Judiciary ===
As of Round 9

List of all charges from the NRL Judiciary.

Round	Player	Charge	Record	Plea	Result	Ref
Round 1	Aublix Tawha	Dangerous Contact (Grade 1)	2nd Offence	Guilty - early plea	$1800 fine	
Round 3	Kotoni Staggs	Careless High Tackle (Grade 1)	1st Offence	Guilty - early plea	$1000 fine	
Round 6	Patrick Carrigan	Careless High Tackle (Grade 2)	2nd Offence	Guilty - early plea	2 game suspension	
Round 7	Brendan Piakura	Crusher Tackle (Grade 1)	2nd Offence	Guilty - early plea	$3000 fine	
Round 8	Preston Riki	Careless High Tackle (Grade 2)	1st Offence	Guilty - early plea	1 game suspension	
Round 8	Ezra Mam	Dangerous Contact [Tripping] (Grade 1)	1st Offence	Guilty - early plea	$1000 fine	
Round 9	Kotoni Staggs	Dangerous Contact (Grade 2)	2nd Offence	Guilty - early plea	2 game suspension	

=== Injuries ===
As of Round 13

List of all injuries sustained during the 2026 season.

Round	Player	Injury	Length	Status	Ref
Round 2	Jack Gosiewski	Concussion (Category 1)	17 days	Recovered	
Round 2	Adam Reynolds	Rib Cartilage	15 days	Recovered	
Round 3	Payne Haas	Shoulder	15 days	Recovered	
Round 3 (QLD Cup)	Delouise Hoeter	Broken Fibula, Syndesmosis	10-12 weeks	Active	
Round 4	Grant Anderson	MCL (Grade 3), Fractured Tibial Plateau	71 days	Recovered	
Round 5	Reece Walsh	Fractured Cheekbone	28 days	Recovered	
Round 5	Ben Hunt	MCL (Grade 3)	35 days	Recovered	
Round 5	Adam Reynolds	Adductor Longus strain (Grade 2)	14 days	Recovered	
Round 5 (QLD Cup)	Aublix Tawha	Broken Eye Socket	22 days	Recovered	
Round 6	Blake Mozer	Broken Jaw	50 days	Recovered	
Round 6	Cory Paix	Concussion (Category 1)	14 days	Recovered	
Round 7	Payne Haas	MCL (Grade 3)	43 days	Recovered	
Round 7	Kotoni Staggs	Plantar Fascia strain	6 days	Recovered	
Round 7	Jesse Arthars	Interosseous Membrane tear	14 days	Recovered	
Round 7	Corey Jensen	Pulmonary Embolism	Unknown	Active	
Round 8	Brendan Piakura	LCL	37 days	Recovered	
Round 9	Deine Mariner	Acute Compartment Syndrome (right thigh)	Unknown	Active	
Round 9	Adam Reynolds	Concussion (Category 1)	15 days	Recovered	
Round 11	Jordan Riki	Plantar Fascia	25 days	Recovered	
Round 13	Pat Carrigan	Syndesmosis	6 weeks	Active	
Round 13	Gehamat Shibasaki	MCL (Grade 2)	5-6 weeks	Active	

== Jerseys ==
Home	Away

In July 2025, Brisbane Broncos extended its ASICS footwear and apparel partnership agreement.

In November 2025, the Broncos announced a logo change, to take immediate effect. The modern new logo features the iconic Bronco, forward-facing, at its heart, a shield nodding to the original 1988 logo, and the Brisbane River flowing through the mark.

Home

Launched alongside a club-wide logo change, the 2026 home jersey features the modernized forward-facing Bronco emblem inside a shield that pays homage to the original 1988 design. The jersey maintains the traditional deep maroon base with gold accents, produced by ASICS following a partnership extension in July 2025.

Away

Launched alongside the home strip and logo change, the 2026 away jersey is a jersey dedicated to club icon Cyril Connell Jr..

Heritage

The 2026 heritage jersey is a throwback to the 2006 season, marking the 20th anniversary of the club's sixth premiership. The design replicates the aesthetic worn during the 2006 Grand Final.

WCC

Created for the club's return to the world stage against Hull KR, the 2026 World Club Challenge jersey is a celebratory "Clash of Champions" strip. It features a unique pattern of chevrons inspired by the 1997 World Club Challenge winning jersey and includes a seventh premiership mark on the back of the neck to commemorate the 2025 title. The traditional Broncos maroon and gold is reimagined with Premiers Gold befitting of champions. The white as well as the inclusion of a collar are subtle nods to the away jersey worn in the 2025 NRL Grand Final.

== Milestone games ==
As of Round 10

Round	Player	Milestone
World Club Challenge	Aublix Tawha	Broncos Debut
Round 1	Aublix Tawha	Broncos NRL Debut
Round 3	Grant Anderson	Broncos Debut
Round 4	Corey Jensen	150 NRL Games
Round 4	Deine Mariner	50 NRL Games
Round 5	Kotoni Staggs	150 NRL Games
Round 5	Reece Walsh	100 NRL Games
Round 5	Antonio Verhoeven	NRL Debut
Round 6	Jesse Arthars	100 NRL Games
Round 6	Tom Duffy	Broncos Debut, 1st NRL Field Goal
Round 7	Cameron Bukowski	NRL Debut
Round 7	Hayze Perham	Broncos Debut
Round 8	Preston Riki	Broncos Debut
Round 8	Va'a Semu	NRL Debut
Round 10	Antonio Verhoeven	1st NRL Try

== Player statistics ==
As of Round 9

Players with no appearances are not included on the list.

Player	Games	Tries	Goals	Field goals	Points
Grant Anderson	2	0	0	0	0
Jesse Arthars	4	2	0	0	8
Cameron Bukowski	1	0	0	0	0
(Australia) Patrick Carrigan	8	2	0	0	8
Tom Duffy	2	0	9	1	19
Jack Gosiewski	6	0	0	0	0
(Samoa) Payne Haas	7	1	0	0	4
(Australia) Ben Hunt	6	0	0	0	0
Jaiyden Hunt	2	0	0	0	0
Corey Jensen	8	0	0	0	0
Josiah Karapani	9	3	0	0	12
Ezra Mam	10	3	0	0	12
(Samoa) Deine Mariner	10	3	0	0	12
Blake Mozer	1	0	0	0	0
Cory Paix	9	1	0	0	4
Hayze Perham	2	0	0	0	0
(Cook Islands) Brendan Piakura	6	0	0	0	0
Adam Reynolds	8	1	20	1	45
(New Zealand) Jordan Riki	10	3	0	0	12
Preston Riki	1	0	0	0	0
Josh Rogers	3	0	0	0	0
(Australia) Gehamat Shibasaki	9	5	0	0	20
Va'a Semu	2	0	0	0	0
(Australia) Kotoni Staggs	10	7	1	0	30
Ben Talty	10	2	0	0	8
Aublix Tawha	4	0	0	0	0
Antonio Verhoeven	1	0	0	0	0
(Australia) Reece Walsh	7	5	4	0	28
(New Zealand) Xavier Willison	10	3	0	0	12
29 players used	10	41	34	2	234

== Representative honours ==
This table lists all players who have played a representative match in 2026.

Player	All Stars	State of Origin 1	State of Origin 2	State of Origin 3	Internationals/World Cup
Jesse Arthars	Māori	—N/a	—N/a	—N/a	—N/a
Preston Riki	Māori	—N/a	—N/a	—N/a	—N/a

== Timeline ==
=== Pre-season ===
- 6 November 2025 - Broncos confirm the 2026 World Club Challenge against Hull KR, to be played at MKM Stadium.
- 11 November 2025 - Broncos confirm Coby Black will depart the club at the end of the 2026 season.
- 25 November 2025 - Broncos announce a new club logo, replacing the old logo effective immediately.
- 25 November 2025 - Broncos announce their 2026 Away jersey, in a design in honour of Cyril Connell Jr..
- 2 December 2025 - Broncos release Black effective immediately, to join Canberra Raiders.
- 13 December 2025 - it was reported the following players would join the NRL squad during the preseason on train and trial contracts: Jamal Shibasaki, Preston Riki, Mason Teague, Luke Gale, Kane Bradley.
- 20 January 2026 - Brendan Piakura suffers a meniscus tear at training, with an 8 week return expected.
- 5 February 2026 - Broncos announce 20-man squad to travel to England for WCC, featuring recruits Aublix Tawha and Grant Anderson. Blake Mozer and Jack Gosiewski return from injury.
- 8 February 2026 - Payne Haas and his management advise the Broncos that he will depart the club at the end of 2026.
- 9 February 2026 - Broncos announce their 2026 WCC jersey.
- 9 February 2026 - 2025 Premiership winning captain Adam Reynolds announces he will retire at the end of the 2026 season.

=== Season ===
- 16 March 2026 - Broncos launch 2026 Heritage jersey.
- 17 March 2026 - Broncos name Piakura to return from injury and Anderson to make his club debut in Round 3.
- 24 March 2026 - Broncos announce assistant coach Ben Te'o has resigned from his position.
- 28 March 2026 - Broncos confirm Josiah Karapani received a Queensland Police Service infringement notice for the offence of ‘Public Nuisance’ and a banning notice in Fortitude Valley.
- 31 March 2026 - Broncos re-sign Cory Paix until the end of the 2028 season.
- 31 March 2026 - Broncos extend Antonio Verhoeven to a 3-year contract from 2027.
- 31 March 2026 - Broncos stand Josiah Karapani down for one match.
- 12 April 2026 - Broncos grant Ben Te Kura a six-week absence, to undertake NFL training.
- 15 April 2026 - Off-contract Ben Hunt's management advise the club of his desire to play on in 2027.
- 16 April 2026 - Broncos sign New Zealand Warriors captain Mitch Barnett for 2027 on a 3-year deal and agree to release Anderson to the Warriors from 2027.
- 17 April 2026 - Broncos re-sign Phillip Coates for the 2027 season.

== NRLQ (Under 21's) ==
NRLQ is an Under 21's competition for the 4 Queensland based NRL sides, launched by the NRL in partnership with the Queensland Rugby League. This year, the format has been expanded to be a 12-round home-and-away round robin competition with the top 2 teams to compete as the Grand Final.

Former Broncos NRL captain Darius Boyd is the side's NRLQ Head Coach in 2026.

Brisbane Broncos 2026 NRLQ Squad
First team squad		Coaching staff
Seth Gundry – FB; Siosaia Poese – WG, WG; Phillip Coates – CE; Joseph Tupuse – CE; Oliver Patterson – WG; Preston Cassidy – FE; Bailey McConnell (c) – HB; Beni Allen – PR; Cameron Bukowski – HK; Brady Turner (vc) – PR; Jett Bryce – SR; Jamal Shibasaki – SR; Tupou Francis – LK	William Saunders – HK; Oliver Kleijn; Zane Ford – SR; Samuel Williams – LK; Payton Gifford – HB; Travis Larner – SR; Thomas Morcom – CE; Michael Waqa – PR; Marley Igasan – PR; Sam Martin; Matthew Schultz; Disharne Tonihi – WG; Tokoaitua Owen	Manager: Michael Kennedy; Head coach: Darius Boyd; Legend: (c) Captain(s); (vc) Vice-captain(s)
