= 2025 Brisbane Broncos season =

NRL rugby league season

- 2025 NRL premiers
- NRL rank: 4th
- Play-off result: Won Grand Final, (Melbourne Storm, 26–22)
- 2025 record: Wins: 15; losses: 9
- Points scored: For: 680; against: 508

Team information
- CEO: (Australia) Dave Donaghy
- Coach: (Australia) Michael Maguire
- Captain: (Australia) Adam Reynolds (22 games) (Australia) Patrick Carrigan (5 games)
- Stadium: Suncorp Stadium – 52,500
- Avg. attendance: 41,185
- Agg. attendance: 494,224
- High attendance: 52,492 (Round 3 v Cowboys)
- Low attendance: 38,016 (Round 11 v Dragons)

Top scorers
- Tries: Gehamat Shibasaki (18)
- Goals: Adam Reynolds (81)
- Points: Adam Reynolds (180)
← 2024	List of seasons	2026 →

The 2025 Brisbane Broncos season was the 38th season in the club's history and in the National Rugby League. Michael Maguire was hired as head coach for 2025 following the dismissal of Kevin Walters. Adam Reynolds once again captained the squad, with Patrick Carrigan acting as captain in games where Reynolds was unavailable.

Despite a mid-season slump where the Broncos lost six out of seven games, the club was able to return to the NRL finals after missing out the previous year. In the finals, the Broncos staged three consecutive second-half comebacks on their way to becoming NRL premiers; the club's first premiership title since 2006.

== Squad information ==
Brisbane Broncos 2025 Squad
Top 30 squad - 2025 NRL season			Supplementary list	Coaching staff
Jesse Arthars – WG, FB; Fletcher Baker – PR; Coby Black – HB; Patrick Carrigan – PR, LK; Selwyn Cobbo – WG, FB; Jack Gosiewski – SR; Payne Haas – PR; Kobe Hetherington – LK; Delouise Hoeter – CE; Ben Hunt – FE, HB, HK	Jaiyden Hunt – SR, PR; Corey Jensen – PR; Josiah Karapani – WG; Israel Leota – WG; Jock Madden – HB; Ezra Mam – FE; Deine Mariner – WG, CE; Blake Mozer – HK; Cory Paix – HK; Brendan Piakura – SR	Adam Reynolds (c) – HB; Jordan Riki – SR; Josh Rogers – FE; Tyson Smoothy – LK, HK; Kotoni Staggs – CE; Ben Te Kura – PR; Reece Walsh – FB; Billy Walters – HK, FE; Xavier Willison – PR, SR	Jett Bryce – SR; Cameron Bukowski – HK; Hayze Perham – FB, CE; Va'a Semu – PR; Gehamat Shibasaki – CE; Extended squad: Ben Talty – PR	Head coach: Michael Maguire; Assistant coaches: Matt Ballin; Trent Barrett; Ben Te'o; Legend: (c) Captain(s); (vc) Vice-captain(s); Updated: 5 October 2025; Source(s): Broncos Team Profiles

== Squad changes ==
=== Transfers in ===
Date	Pos.	Player	From	Year/s	Ref.
1 November 2024	Fullback	Hayze Perham	Canterbury-Bankstown Bulldogs	1 Year	
26 November 2024	Centre	Gehamat Shibasaki	South Sydney Rabbitohs	T&T	
26 November 2024	Five-eighth	Ben Hunt	St. George Illawarra Dragons	2 Years	
17 June 2025	Prop	Ben Talty	North Sydney Bears	2 Years	

=== Transfers out ===
Date	Pos.	Player	To	Year/s	Ref.
7 August 2024	Fullback	Tristan Sailor	St Helens	2 Years	
10 October 2024	Wing	Corey Oates	Retired	N/A	
17 May 2025	Prop	Martin Taupau	Released	N/A	

== Staff changes ==
=== Transfers in ===
Date	Role	Person	From	Year/s	Ref.
30 September 2024	Head coach	Michael Maguire	New South Wales Blues	3 Years	
17 October 2024	Football Operations Manager	Troy Thomson	Australia Kangaroos		
4 November 2024	Assistant Coach	Trent Barrett	Parramatta Eels		
4 November 2024	Assistant Coach	Ben Te'o	Redcliffe Dolphins		

=== Transfers out ===
Date	Role	Person	To	Year/s	Ref.
22 May 2024	Assistant Coach	John Cartwright	Hull FC as Head Coach	3 Years	
22 July 2024	Assistant Coach	Lee Briers	St Helens	2 Years	
26 September 2024	Head coach	Kevin Walters	n/a	n/a	
17 October 2024	Football Manager	Joe McDermott	n/a	n/a	

== 2025 Premiership Team ==
Brisbane Broncos
2025 Premiership Team	Interchange	Coach
1 Reece Walsh – FB; 2 Josiah Karapani – WG; 3 Kotoni Staggs – CE; 4 Gehamat Shibasaki – CE; 5 Deine Mariner – WG; 6 Ben Hunt – FE; 7 Adam Reynolds (c) – HB; 8 Corey Jensen – PR; 9 Cory Paix – HK; 10 Payne Haas – PR; 11 Brendan Piakura – SR; 12 Jordan Riki – SR; 13 Patrick Carrigan – LK	14 Ezra Mam; 15 Kobe Hetherington; 16 Xavier Willison; 17 Tyson Smoothy	Head coach: Michael Maguire; Assistant coaches: Matt Ballin; Trent Barrett; Ben Te'o; Legend: (c) Captain(s); (vc) Vice-captain(s)

== Pre-season ==
=== Pre-Season Challenge ===
Brisbane Broncos played the Gold Coast Titans in Toowoomba and the Canterbury-Bankstown Bulldogs in Redcliffe as their pre-season fixtures. Both matches were part of the third edition of the NRL Pre-season Challenge. The Broncos won both of these games and finished on top of the pre-season standings, winning the A$100,000 prize.

Round 2: 16 February 2025	Brisbane Broncos	50–12	Gold Coast Titans	Toowoomba
14:30 AEST	Tries: Shibasaki 9'; Paix 19', 25'; Piakura 21'; Deine Mariner 43', 53'; Siegwalt 45'; Hoeter 49'; Te Kura 57'; Goals: Reynolds 7/9 10', 18', 23', 26', 47', 55', 59'	Report	Tries: Fifita 38'; De Groot 67'; Goals: Weaver 2/2 40', 69'	Stadium: Clive Berghofer Stadium; Attendance: 6,805; Referee: Daniel Schwass

Round 3: 22 February 2025	Brisbane Broncos	30–14	Canterbury-Bankstown Bulldogs	Redcliffe
16:30 AEST	Tries: Reynolds 22'; Arthars 32'; Cobbo 39'; Hoeter 46'; Mariner 70'; Te Kura 75'; Goals: Reynolds 3/6 23', 71', 75'	Report	Tries: Preston 58'; Rinakama 65'; Wilson 68'; Goals: Burton 1/3 59'; Sin bin: Curran (yellow card) 77' to 80'	Stadium: Kayo Stadium; Referee: Todd Smith

Win Draw Loss

== Regular season ==
=== Results by round ===
Round	1	2	3	4	5	6	7	8	9	10	11	12	13	14	15	16	17	18	19	20	21	22	23	24	25	26	27
Ground	A	A	H	A	H	H	A	H	A	A	H	N	A	H	N	H	H	A	A	N	H	H	A	H	A	A	H
Result	W	L	W	W	W	L	L	W	L	L	L	B	L	W	B	W	W	W	W	B	L	W	L	W	W	W	W
Position	2	6	8	3	2	3	5	5	5	7	9	8	11	8	7	5	5	5	5	5	6	6	6	6	5	4	4
Points	2	2	4	6	8	8	8	10	10	10	10	12	12	14	16	18	20	22	24	26	26	28	28	30	32	34	36

Source: National Rugby League
A = Away; H = Home; N = Neutral; B = Bye; W = Win; D = Draw; L = Loss

=== Matches ===
The league fixtures were released on 21 November 2024.

Win Draw Loss Bye Fixtures

Round 1: 6 March 2025	Sydney Roosters	14–50	Brisbane Broncos	Moore Park
19:00 AEDT	Tries: Young 6', 73'; S. Smith 58'; Goals: S. Smith 1/3 75'; Sin bin: Piakura (yellow card) 72' to 80'	Report	Tries: Shibasaki 14'; Paix 19'; Gosiewski 24'; Cobbo 43', 46', 69'; Hunt 53'; Walsh 56'; Arthars 66'; Goals: Reynolds 7/10 15', 20', 26', pen 36', 45', 48', 67'	Stadium: Allianz Stadium; Attendance: 23,226; Referee: Gerard Sutton

Round 2: 15 March 2025	Canberra Raiders	32–22	Brisbane Broncos	Canberra
19:35 AEDT	Tries: Nicholson 7', 37'; Papali'i 16'; Starling 46'; Timoko 50'; Tamale 58'; Goals: Fogarty 4/6 9', 18', 52', 59'	Report	Tries: Arthars 25', 33', 77'; Cobbo 64'; Goals: Reynolds 3/4 26', 64', 77'	Stadium: GIO Stadium; Attendance: 18,884; Referee: Wyatt Raymond

=== Ladder ===
Pos	Team	Pld	W	D	L	B	PF	PA	PD	Pts	Qualification
1	Canberra Raiders	24	19	0	5	3	654	506	+148	44	Advance to finals series
2	Melbourne Storm	24	17	0	7	3	671	459	+212	40	Advance to finals series
3	Canterbury-Bankstown Bulldogs	24	16	0	8	3	534	414	+120	38	Advance to finals series
4	Brisbane Broncos (P)	24	15	0	9	3	680	508	+172	36	Advance to finals series
5	Cronulla-Sutherland Sharks	24	15	0	9	3	599	490	+109	36	Advance to finals series
6	New Zealand Warriors	24	14	0	10	3	517	496	+21	34	Advance to finals series
7	Penrith Panthers	24	13	1	10	3	576	469	+107	33	Advance to finals series
8	Sydney Roosters	24	13	0	11	3	653	521	+132	32	Advance to finals series
9	Dolphins	24	12	0	12	3	721	596	+125	30	
10	Manly Warringah Sea Eagles	24	12	0	12	3	555	534	+21	30	
11	Parramatta Eels	24	10	0	14	3	502	578	−76	26	
12	North Queensland Cowboys	24	9	1	14	3	538	684	−146	25	
13	Wests Tigers	24	9	0	15	3	477	612	−135	24	
14	South Sydney Rabbitohs	24	9	0	15	3	427	608	−181	24	
15	St. George Illawarra Dragons	24	8	0	16	3	498	628	−130	22	
16	Gold Coast Titans	24	6	0	18	3	520	719	−199	18	
17	Newcastle Knights	24	6	0	18	3	338	638	−300	18	

Source: National Rugby League
(P) Premiers

== Representative honours ==
This table lists all players who played a representative match in 2025.

- (c) = Captain
- (vc) = Vice-captain

Player	All Stars	State of Origin 1	State of Origin 2	State of Origin 3	Internationals/Pacific Championships
Jesse Arthars	Māori	—N/a	—N/a	—N/a	—N/a
Patrick Carrigan	—N/a	Queensland	Queensland	Queensland	Australia
Payne Haas	—N/a	New South Wales	New South Wales	New South Wales	Samoa
Deine Mariner	—N/a	—N/a	—N/a	—N/a	Samoa
Brendan Piakura	—N/a	—N/a	—N/a	—N/a	Cook Islands
Jordan Riki	Māori	—N/a	—N/a	—N/a	—N/a
Gehamat Shibasaki	—N/a	—N/a	—N/a	Queensland	Australia
Kotoni Staggs	—N/a	—N/a	—N/a	—N/a	Australia
Reece Walsh	—N/a	—N/a	—N/a	—N/a	Australia
Xavier Willison	Māori	—N/a	—N/a	—N/a	New Zealand

== Player statistics ==
As of pre-season

Players with no appearances are not included on the list.

Player	Apps	T	C	FG	Total
