= 2024 Brisbane Broncos season =

NRL rugby league season

- NRL Rank: 12th
- Play-off result: DNQ
- 2024 record: Wins: 10; losses: 14
- Points scored: For: 537; against: 607

Team information
- CEO: Dave Donaghy
- Head Coach: Kevin Walters
- Captain: (Australia) Adam Reynolds (Australia) Patrick Carrigan
- Stadium: Suncorp Stadium (Capacity: 52,500)
- Avg. attendance: 33,405 (as at Round 15)
- High attendance: 50,971 (Round 11)
- Low attendance: 12,207 (Round 15)
← 2023	List of seasons	2025 →

The 2024 Brisbane Broncos season was the 37th in the club's rugby league football history. In round 26 on 31 August at Suncorp Stadium, the Dolphins won the Battle for Brisbane derby 40-6. By the end of that round, the Brisbane Broncos did not have enough premiership points to qualify for the finals. The following week at Suncorp, 2024 minor premiers Melbourne Storm defeated Brisbane 50-12 in the latter's last game of the year.

After Brisbane finished twelfth on the competition ladder, Kevin Walters' position as head coach came under heavy media scrutiny. An internal club review was conducted after the end of the regular season, and Walters was terminated from his coaching position on 26 September 2024.

== Squad ==
Brisbane Broncos 2024 squad
Top 30 squad - 2024 NRL season			Supplementary list	Coaching staff
Jesse Arthars – WG, CE; Fletcher Baker – PR; Patrick Carrigan – LK; Selwyn Cobbo – CE, FB; Jack Gosiewski – SR; Payne Haas – PR; Kobe Hetherington – LK; Delouise Hoeter – CE; Jaiyden Hunt – SR, PR; Corey Jensen – PR	Josiah Karapani – CE, WG; Jock Madden – HB, FE; Ezra Mam – FE; Deine Mariner – WG; Blake Mozer – HK; Corey Oates – WG; Cory Paix – HK; Brendan Piakura – SR; Adam Reynolds (c) – HB; Jordan Riki – SR	Tristan Sailor – FB; Tyson Smoothy – HK; Kotoni Staggs – CE; Martin Taupau – PR; Ben Te Kura – PR; Reece Walsh – FB; Billy Walters – HK; Xavier Willison – PR, SR	Coby Black – HB, FE; Israel Leota – WG, CE; Josh Rogers – HB, FE; Bailey Trew – CE, FB; Extended squad: Va'a Semu – PR	Head coach: Kevin Walters; Assistant coaches: Matt Ballin; John Cartwright; Darius Boyd; Dave Ballard (Head Of Performance); Lee Briers (Development Coach); Legend: (c) Captain(s); (vc) Vice-captain(s); Updated: 5 September 2024; Source(s): Broncos Team Profiles

== Player movement ==
The following player movements happened across the previous season, off-season and pre-season.

=== Gains ===
Player	Previous club	Length
Fletcher Baker	Sydney Roosters	2025
Jack Gosiewski	North Queensland Cowboys	2025
Jaiyden Hunt	St. George Illawarra	2025
Josiah Karapani	South Sydney Rabbitohs	2024

=== Losses ===
Player	New Club
Logan Bayliss-Brow	Unsigned
Kurt Capewell	New Zealand Warriors
Herbie Farnworth	Dolphins
Thomas Flegler	Dolphins
Keenan Palasia	Gold Coast Titans

== Pre-season ==
Trial: 10 February 2024	Wynnum Manly Seagulls	16–26	Brisbane Broncos	Brisbane
16:00 AEST	Tries: Clarke 28'; Goals: Moore 1/1 29'	[Report Report]	Tries: Trew; Karapani; Burns 18'; Jackson 51'; Jenkins 58', 78'; Woolf 67'; Kaho 71'; Goals: Brown 5/6 4', 19', 68', 72', 79'; Baira 2/2 37', 40'; Hubner 2/2 52', 59'	Stadium: BMD Kougari Oval; Attendance: 5,000

Round 1: 18 February 2024	North Queensland Cowboys	20–46	Brisbane Broncos	Mackay
15:00 AEST	Tries: Valemei 20'; Finefeuiaki 28'; Mullany 33'; Purdue 79'; Goals: Duffy 0/2; Mullany 1/1 35'; Purdue 1/1 79'	[Report Report]	Tries: Oates 1'; Piakura 16', 25'; Cobbo 41'; Walsh 43'; Sailor 50'; Te Kura 68'; Paix 77'; Goals: Reynolds 2/3 17', 27'; Walsh 3/3 42', 44', 52'; Madden 2/2 69', 78'	Stadium: BB Print Stadium; Attendance: 5,332; Referee: Ziggy Przeklasa-Adamski

Round 2: 24 February 2024	Manly Warringah Sea Eagles	14–40	Brisbane Broncos	Sydney
17:55 AEDT	Tries: Parker 3'; Lehmann 11', 51'; Goals: Humphreys 1/3 5'	[Report Report]	Tries: Falls 16', 63'; Saitaua 35'; Hopoate 39'; Hoeter 40'; Paix 59'; Patston 74'; Goals: Rogers 6/7 17', 37', 39', 61', 65', 75'	Stadium: 4 Pines Park; Referee: Grant Atkins

== Regular season ==
=== Ladder ===
Pos	Team	Pld	W	D	L	B	PF	PA	PD	Pts	Qualification
1	Melbourne Storm	24	19	0	5	3	692	449	+243	44	Advance to finals series
2	Penrith Panthers (P)	24	17	0	7	3	580	394	+186	40	Advance to finals series
3	Sydney Roosters	24	16	0	8	3	738	463	+275	38	Advance to finals series
4	Cronulla-Sutherland Sharks	24	16	0	8	3	653	431	+222	38	Advance to finals series
5	North Queensland Cowboys	24	15	0	9	3	657	568	+89	36	Advance to finals series
6	Canterbury-Bankstown Bulldogs	24	14	0	10	3	529	433	+96	34	Advance to finals series
7	Manly Warringah Sea Eagles	24	13	1	10	3	634	521	+113	33	Advance to finals series
8	Newcastle Knights	24	12	0	12	3	470	510	−40	30	Advance to finals series
9	Canberra Raiders	24	12	0	12	3	474	601	−127	30	
10	Dolphins	24	11	0	13	3	577	578	−1	28	
11	St. George Illawarra Dragons	24	11	0	13	3	508	634	−126	28	
12	Brisbane Broncos	24	10	0	14	3	537	607	−70	26	
13	New Zealand Warriors	24	9	1	14	3	512	574	−62	25	
14	Gold Coast Titans	24	8	0	16	3	488	656	−168	22	
15	Parramatta Eels	24	7	0	17	3	561	716	−155	20	
16	South Sydney Rabbitohs	24	7	0	17	3	494	682	−188	20	
17	Wests Tigers	24	6	0	18	3	463	750	−287	18	

Source: National Rugby League
(P) Premiers

=== Result by round ===
Round	1	2	3	4	5	6	7	8	9	10	11	12	13	14	15	16	17	18	19	20	21	22	23	24	25	26	27
Ground	A	H	A	H	A	H	H	A	H	A	N	H	–	H	A	–	A	H	H	A	H	A	A	–	H	A	H
Result	L	W	L	W	L	W	W	W	L	W	W	L	B	L	L	B	L	L	L	W	L	L	W	B	W	L	L
Position	12	9	14	12	11	10	6	5	7	6	5	6	5	8	9	7	10	11	13	11	13	14	12	10	9	12	12
Points	0	2	2	4	4	6	8	10	10	12	14	14	16	16	16	18	18	18	18	20	20	20	22	24	26	26	26

Source: National Rugby League
A = Away; H = Home; N = Neutral; B = Bye; W = Win; D = Draw; L = Loss

=== Matches ===
Round 1: 3 March 2024	Sydney Roosters	20–10	Brisbane Broncos	Las Vegas, United States
14:30 AEST	Tries: Manu 4'; Pauga 51'; Radley 71'; Goals: Walker 4/4 5', 15 pen', 53', 73'	[Report Report]	Tries: Mariner 35'; Walsh 59'; Goals: Reynolds 1/2 60'; Field goals: Reynolds 0/1 (2pt)	Stadium: Allegiant Stadium; Attendance: 40,746; Referee: Adam Gee

Round 2: 14 March 2024	Brisbane Broncos	28–18	South Sydney Rabbitohs	Brisbane
19:00 AEST	Tries: Mariner 17', 74'; Walsh 24', 62'; Arthars 51'; Goals: Reynolds 1/3 26'; Walsh 2/2 64', 76'	[Report Report]	Tries: Havili 42'; Moale 45'; Mitchell 79'; Goals: Mitchell 3/3 43', 46', 79'; Sin bin: Cook (yellow card) 29' to 39'	Stadium: Suncorp Stadium; Attendance: 35,507; Referee: Gerard Sutton

Round 3: 21 March 2024	Penrith Panthers	34–12	Brisbane Broncos	Penrith
19:00 AEST	Tries: Turuva 13'; Tago 21', 36'; Kenny 24'; To'o 45', 49'; Goals: Cleary 5/6 22', 26', 37', 47', 51'	[Report Report]	Tries: Mariner 55'; Arthars 60'; Goals: Staggs 2/3 4 pen', 61'	Stadium: Bluebet Stadium; Attendance: 20,089; Referee: Gerard Sutton

Round 4: 29 March 2024	Brisbane Broncos	38–12	North Queensland Cowboys	Brisbane
19:05 AEST	Tries: Walters 2'; Arthars 12'; Staggs 18'; Smoothy 53'; Mam 69'; Oates 75'; Goals: Reynolds 7/8 3', 6 pen', 13', 36 pen', 54', 71', 75'	[Report Report]	Tries: Holmes 15'; Drinkwater 31'; Goals: Holmes 2/2 16', 32'	Stadium: Suncorp Stadium; Attendance: 45,793; Referee: Grant Atkins

Round 5: 4 April 2024	Melbourne Storm	34–32	Brisbane Broncos	Melbourne
19:00 AEST	Tries: Katoa 19', 35'; Coates 23'; Warbrick 57'; Wishart 73'; Hughes 76'; Goals: Meaney 5/6 21', 37', 58', 74', 76'	[Report Report]	Tries: Mariner 14'; Mam 26', 49'; Arthars 30'; Te Kura 77'; Goals: Reynolds 3/3 15', 28', 31'; Staggs 3/3 50', 68 pen', 77'	Stadium: AAMI Park; Attendance: 20,698; Referee: Ashley Klein

Round 6: 12 April 2024	Brisbane Broncos	28–14	Dolphins	Brisbane
20:00 AEST	Tries: Willison 33'; Oates 44'; Walsh 51'; Cobbo 54', 58'; Goals: Walsh 4/5 35', 53', 56', 60'	[Report Report]	Tries: Wallace 22'; Bostock 74'; Isaako 77'; Goals: Isaako 1/3 75'; Field goals: Isaako 0/1 (2pt)	Stadium: Suncorp Stadium; Attendance: 46,224; Referee: Adam Gee

Round 7: 20 April 2024	Brisbane Broncos	34–10	Canberra Raiders	Brisbane
19:35 AEST	Tries: Walsh 12', 31'; Riki 17'; Mam 19'; Walters 27'; Cobbo 55'; Goals: Walsh 5/6 14', 18', 21', 28', 56'	[Report Report]	Tries: Sasagi 49'; Savage 66'; Goals: Stewart 1/2 51'	Stadium: Suncorp Stadium; Attendance: 37,286; Referee: Chris Butler

Round 8: 27 April 2024	Wests Tigers	10–34	Brisbane Broncos	Campbelltown
17:30 AEST	Tries: Staines 69', 73'; Goals: Sezer 1/2 74'; Sin bin: S. Fainu (yellow card) 16' to 26'	[Report Report]	Tries: Mariner 5'; Madden 17', 43'; Walsh 39', 54'; Haas 64'; Goals: Reynolds 5/6 18', 39', 44', 56', 66'	Stadium: Campbelltown Sports Stadium; Attendance: 17,351; Referee: Grant Atkins

Round 9: 3 May 2024	Brisbane Broncos	18–40	Sydney Roosters	Brisbane
20:00 AEST	Tries: Riki 7'; Staggs 46'; Mam 48'; Goals: Reynolds 1/1 9'; Walsh 2/2 47', 50'; Sin bin: Mariner (yellow card) 53' to 63'	[Report Report]	Tries: Manu 11'; Crichton 26', 35'; May 57', 68'; Watson 63'; Young 71'; Goals: Walker 6/7 12', 28', 36', 58', 64', 69'	Stadium: Suncorp Stadium; Attendance: 40,190; Referee: Ashley Klein

Round 10: 10 May 2024	Parramatta Eels	14–30	Brisbane Broncos	Parramatta
20:00 AEST	Tries: Talagi 31'; Brown 41'; Goals: Russell 3/3 8 pen', 33', 42'	[Report; Details Report]	Tries: Walsh 16'; Mariner 24', 38'; Mam 52'; Cobbo 56'; Goals: Walsh 4/4 17', 39', 53', 57'; Staggs 1/1 26'	Stadium: CommBank Stadium; Attendance: 17,393; Referee: Gerard Sutton

Round 11: 17 May 2024	Manly Warringah Sea Eagles	12–13	Brisbane Broncos	Brisbane
20:05 AEST	Tries: Garrick 49'; Vaega 69'; Goals: Garrick 2/2 50', 71'	[Report Report]	Tries: Piakura 6'; Mariner 11'; Goals: Staggs 2/2 8', 12'; Field goals: Madden 1/1 75'	Stadium: Suncorp Stadium; Attendance: 50,971; Referee: Todd Smith

Round 12: 27 May 2024	Brisbane Broncos	34–36	Gold Coast Titans	Brisbane
14:00 AEST	Tries: Haas 4'; Oates 17'; Mariner 20'; Piakura 35'; Mam 52'; Cobbo 73'; Goals: Madden 5/6 6', 19', 21', 37', 53'	[Report Report]	Tries: Francis 12'; Fermor 26'; Clark 38'; Randall 47'; Palasia 60'; Kelly 64'; Khan-Pereira 68'; Goals: Kini 4/7 14', 27', 48', 62'	Stadium: Suncorp Stadium; Attendance: 42,212; Referee: Peter Gough

Round 13 (Bye for Brisbane Broncos)

Round 14: 8 June 2024	Brisbane Broncos	12–22	Cronulla-Sutherland Sharks	Brisbane
19:35 AEST	Tries: Carrigan 11'; Smoothy 32'; Goals: Staggs 2/2 13', 34'	[Report Report]	Tries: Talakai 16'; Katoa 42'; Trindall 47'; Brailey 49'; Goals: Trindall 3/5 44', 48', 51'	Stadium: Suncorp Stadium; Attendance: 41,004; Referee: Grant Atkins

Round 15: 14 June 2024	South Sydney Rabbitohs	22–12	Brisbane Broncos	Sydney Olympic Park
20:00 AEST	Tries: Cook 12'; Koloamatangi 17'; Mitchell 20'; Johnston 49'; Goals: Mitchell 3/4 13', 18', 21'	[Report Report]	Tries: Mariner 66', 77'; Goals: Staggs 2/2 68', 77'	Stadium: Accor Stadium; Attendance: 12,207; Referee: Adam Gee

Round 16 (Bye for Brisbane Broncos)

Round 17: 29 June 2024	New Zealand Warriors	32–16	Brisbane Broncos	Auckland
17:00 NZST	Tries: Harris-Tavita 9', 27'; Martin 14'; Tuivasa-Sheck 58'; Watene-Zelezniak 68'; Lussick 72'; Goals: Pompey 3/6 10', 16', 59'; Harris-Tavita 79 pen'	[Report Report]	Tries: Mariner 30', 51'; Willison 64'; Goals: Staggs 2/3 32', 65'	Stadium: Go Media Stadium; Attendance: 22,711; Referee: Todd Smith

Round 18: 5 July 2024	Brisbane Broncos	6–14	Penrith Panthers	Brisbane
20:00 AEST	Tries: Walsh 26'; Goals: Walsh 1/1 27'	[Report Report]	Tries: Cole 10'; To'o 46'; Kenny 68'; Goals: Edwards 1/3 70'	Stadium: Suncorp Stadium; Attendance: 42,433; Referee: Grant Atkins

Round 19: 13 July 2024	Brisbane Broncos	26–30	St. George Illawarra Dragons	Brisbane
19:35 AEST	Tries: Walters 11'; Mam 54'; Staggs 63', 77'; Mozer 72'; Goals: Staggs 3/5 13', 55', 73'; Sin bin: Staggs (yellow card) 15' to 25'	[Report Report]	Tries: Tuipulotu 6', 30', 43'; Suli 24'; Su'a 33'; Goals: Flanagan 5/7 16 pen', 32', 35', 44', 70 pen'	Stadium: Suncorp Stadium; Attendance: 34,224; Referee: Liam Kennedy

Round 20: 20 July 2024	Newcastle Knights	14–30	Brisbane Broncos	Newcastle
17:30 AEST	Tries: Hetherington 54'; Croker 66'; Marzhew 74'; Goals: Hastings 0/1; Ponga 1/2 67'	[Report Report]	Tries: Mariner 23', 37'; Walsh 29'; Piakura 48'; Mam 64'; Goals: Reynolds 5/5 24', 30', 39', 51', 64'	Stadium: McDonald Jones Stadium; Attendance: 26,952; Referee: Chris Butler

Round 21: 27 July 2024	Brisbane Broncos	16–41	Canterbury-Bankstown Bulldogs	Brisbane
17:00 AEST	Tries: Walsh 29'; Staggs 39'; Taupau 75'; Goals: Reynolds 2/3 40', 75'	[Report Report]	Tries: Xerri 9'; Tracey 16', 57', 70'; Skelton 24'; Kikau 41'; Kiraz 61'; Goals: Burton 6/7 11', 17', 43', 59', 63', 71'; Field goals: Burton 79'	Stadium: Suncorp Stadium; Attendance: 42,213; Referee: Grant Atkins

Round 22: 3 August 2024	Gold Coast Titans	46–18	Brisbane Broncos	Gold Coast
15:00 AEST	Tries: Kini 19', 47'; S. Fifita 26', 54', 73'; Kelly 50'; Khan-Pereira 68'; Sami 76'; Fermor 78'; Goals: Campbell 5/9 28', 51', 55', 70', 79'; Sin bin: Kini (yellow card) 36' to 46'	[Report Report]	Tries: Walsh 10', 14'; Hetherington 33'; Goals: Reynolds 3/4 11', 15', 37 pen'	Stadium: Cbus Super Stadium; Attendance: 25,278; Referee: Peter Gough

Round 23: 10 August 2024	North Queensland Cowboys	18–42	Brisbane Broncos	Townsville
17:30 AEST	Tries: Dearden 9'; Feldt 17'; Vailea 24'; Goals: Holmes 3/3 11', 19', 25'	[Report Report]	Tries: Jensen 3'; Mariner 36'; Rogers 56'; Staggs 63', 74'; Riki 67'; Willison 77'; Goals: Reynolds 7/7 5', 38', 57', 64', 68', 75', 78'	Stadium: Queensland Country Bank Stadium; Attendance: 24,230; Referee: Ashley Klein

Round 24 (Bye for Brisbane Broncos)

Round 25: 23 August 2024	Brisbane Broncos	30–24	Parramatta Eels	Brisbane
20:00 AEST	Tries: Sailor 31'; Rogers 34'; Cobbo 55'; Reynolds 65'; Staggs 67'; Goals: Reynolds 5/5 33', 36', 56', 66', 68'	[Report Report]	Tries: Penisini 2'; Ofahengaue 6'; Sivo 10'; Lane 71'; Goals: Gutherson 4/5 3', 8', 46 pen', 73'	Stadium: Suncorp Stadium; Attendance: 36,289; Referee: Todd Smith

Round 26: 31 August 2024	Dolphins	40–6	Brisbane Broncos	Brisbane
17:30 AEST	Tries: Isaako 13'; Averillo 20', 33'; Tabuai-Fidow 28', 55'; Farnworth 47', 66'; Goals: Isaako 6/7 15', 21', 30', 34', 49', 57'; Sin bin: Kaufusi (yellow card) 17' to 27'	[Report Report]	Tries: Carrigan 24'; Goals: Staggs 1/1 25'; Sin bin: Willison (yellow card) 30' to 40'	Stadium: Suncorp Stadium; Attendance: 50,049; Referee: Adam Gee

Round 27: 5 September 2024	Brisbane Broncos	12–50	Melbourne Storm	Brisbane
19:50 AEST	Tries: Rogers 30'; Arthars 62'; Goals: Reynolds 2/2 32', 63'	[Report Report]	Tries: Warbrick 9', 12', 69'; Hughes 16', 47', 56'; Katoa 21'; Grant 37'; Coates 50'; Goals: Meaney 7/9 11', 14', 23', 39', 48', 52', 58'; Sin bin: Katoa (yellow card) 61' to 71'	Stadium: Suncorp Stadium; Attendance: 35,086; Referee: Todd Smith
