= 2026 World Club Challenge =

Rugby league competition

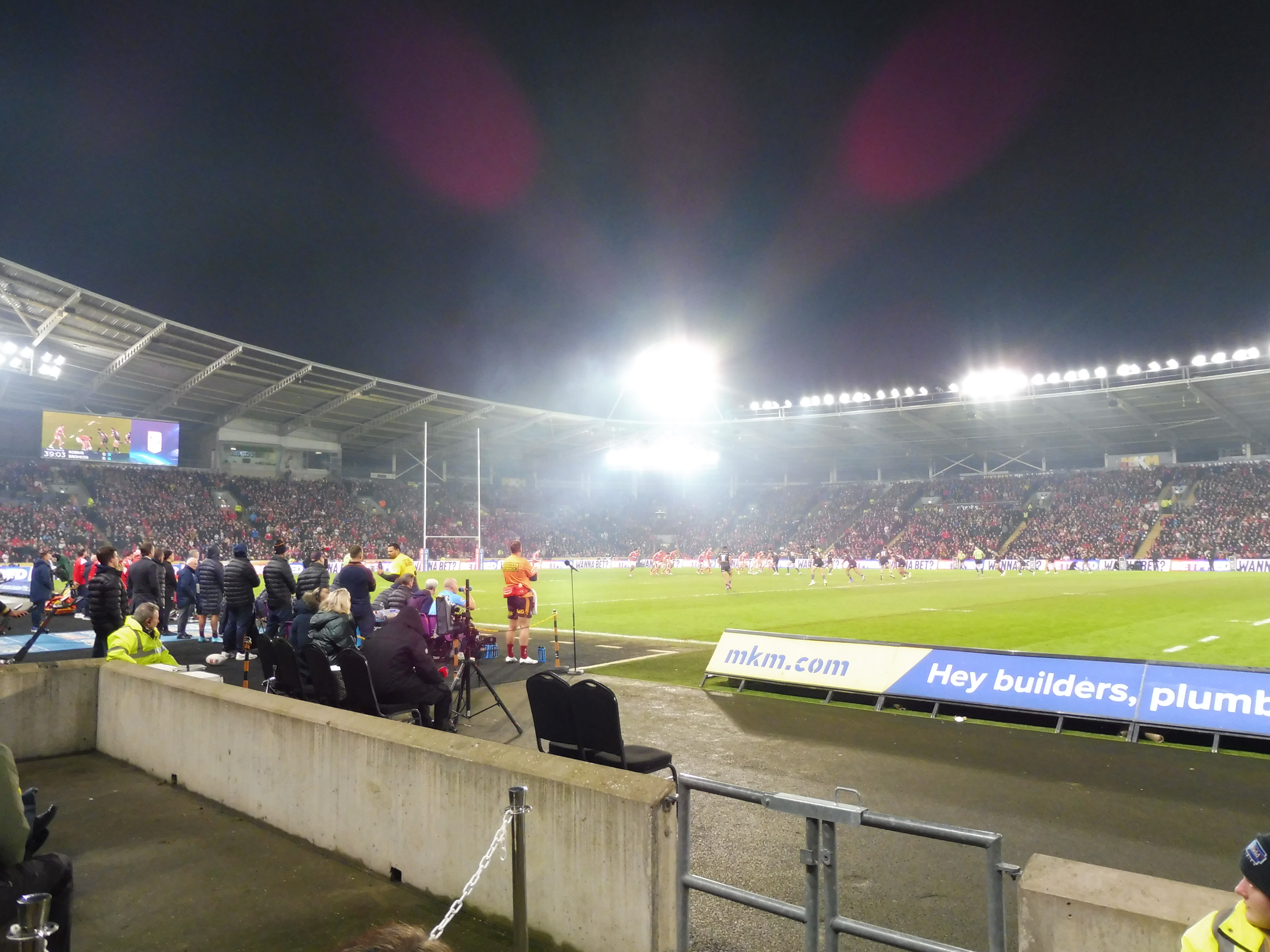
- The MKM Stadium during the match
Hull Kingston Rovers	Brisbane Broncos
(Super League)	(NRL)
30	24
	1	2	Total
HKR	18	12	30
BRI	4	20	24
- Date: 19 February 2026
- Stadium: MKM Stadium
- Location: Kingston upon Hull, England
- Man of the Match: Jez Litten
- Advance Australia Fair and God Save The King: Charlie Cammish
- Referee: Liam Moore (England)
- Attendance: 24,600

Broadcast partners
- Broadcasters: (United Kingdom) BBC Three (United Kingdom) Sky Sports

The 2026 World Club Challenge was the 31st staging of the World Club Challenge, an annual rugby league match between the reigning champions of the Super League and the National Rugby League.

Hull KR beat Brisbane 30–24 to become world champions for the first time in their history.

== Pre-match ==
=== Scheduling ===
Under the agreement between the Super League and NRL regarding scheduling the World Club Challenge after the COVID-19 pandemic, the respective champions would alternate hosting responsibilities across each year. As such, NRL champions Brisbane Broncos' home ground, Lang Park, became an early favourite to host the game; with reigning champions Wigan Warriors' DW Stadium having hosted in 2024. However, following Hull Kingston Rovers becoming Super League champions Brisbane expressed a willingness to travel for the fixture to ease logistical issues with Hull KR playing at NRL's Las Vegas weekend, a factor which resulted in Penrith Panthers withdrawing from the 2025 event. As a result, Hull KR's cross town rivals, Hull FC's larger MKM Stadium emerged as the choice venue, along with a soft date of 21 February. In November, a month after the Grand Finals, Brisbane confirmed they would travel to the United Kingdom for the match, allaying some fears of a second consecutive cancellation.

Wembley Stadium and Elland Road were also touted as potential venues, with Lang Park removed from the running as a result of the soft date for the game clashing with an Ed Sheeran concert at the ground.

Playing the game at the Las Vegas weekend has also been considered earlier in the season, with Qatar also bidding to host the competition.

=== Finances ===
Following confirmation of the match, Hull KR's chief executive revealed that the club's Craven Park ground was never under consideration as due to the ground's size it would have been financially unviable for a match of that magnitude. He stated the priority was to keep the match in Kingston upon Hull with the city never having hosted the tournament, and Elland Road was the second choice venue.

Hull KR were responsible for covering Brisbane's travel and accommodation for the game.

=== Ticketing ===
The game sold out on 16 November, two days after going on sale. The game was the fastest selling World Club Challenge in history, and was the first rugby league sellout at the MKM Stadium, beating the previous attendance record for the sport of 23,000 at the 2007 Hull Derby.

=== Entertainment ===
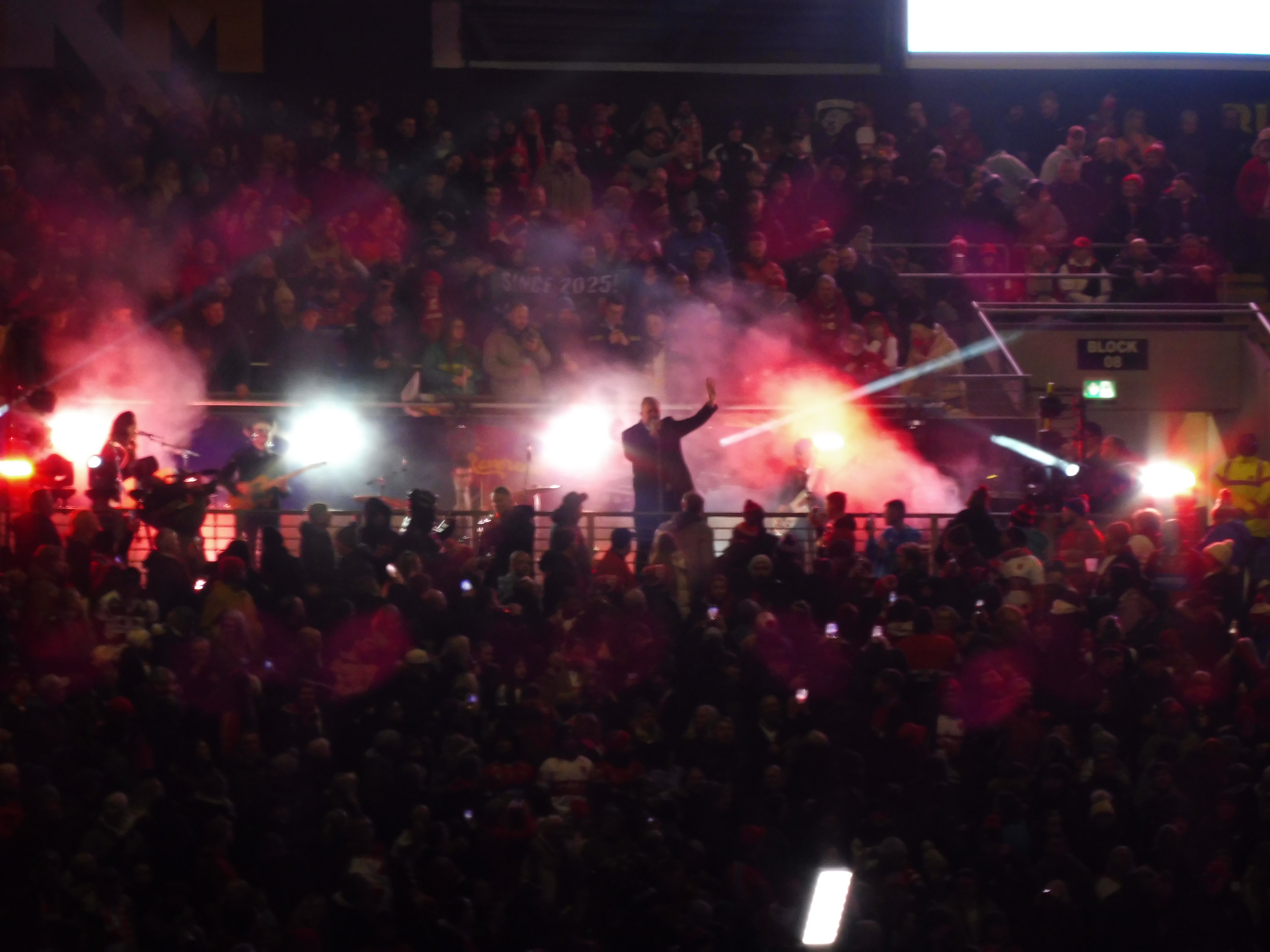
Reverend and the Makers performing pre-match

Reverend and the Makers headlined both the prematch and half-time entertainment, while former X-Factor contestant Charlie Cammish performed the national anthems.

=== Team preparations ===
Brisbane Broncos' UK training base was The Lensbury in London, which was used from 10 February.

Brisbane's squad was named on 5 February, with new signings Grant Anderson and Aublix Tawha appearing and Blake Mozer and Jack Gosiewski returning to the squad after respective injuries, while Hull KR's squad was named on 18 February, with new signings Tom Amone, who made his Hull KR debut, and Karl Lawton appearing in the first team, and Bill Leyland and Tom Whitehead appearing as reserves.

=== Officiating ===
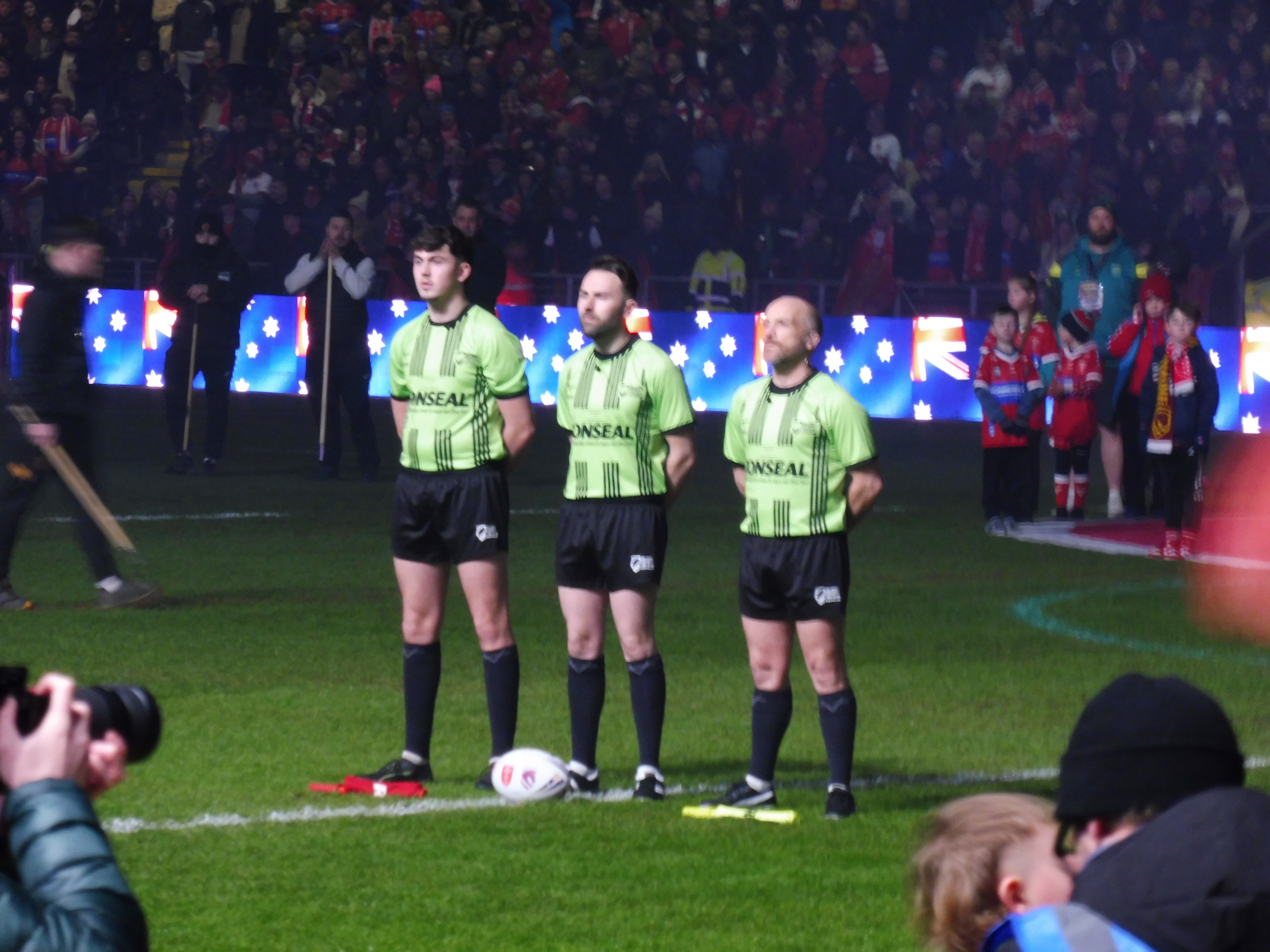
The refereeing team lining up before the game

The RFL named Liam Moore as match referee, Matty Lynn and Richard Thompson as touch judges, Chris Kendall as video referee and Liam Rush as reserve referee on 16 February.

== Match ==
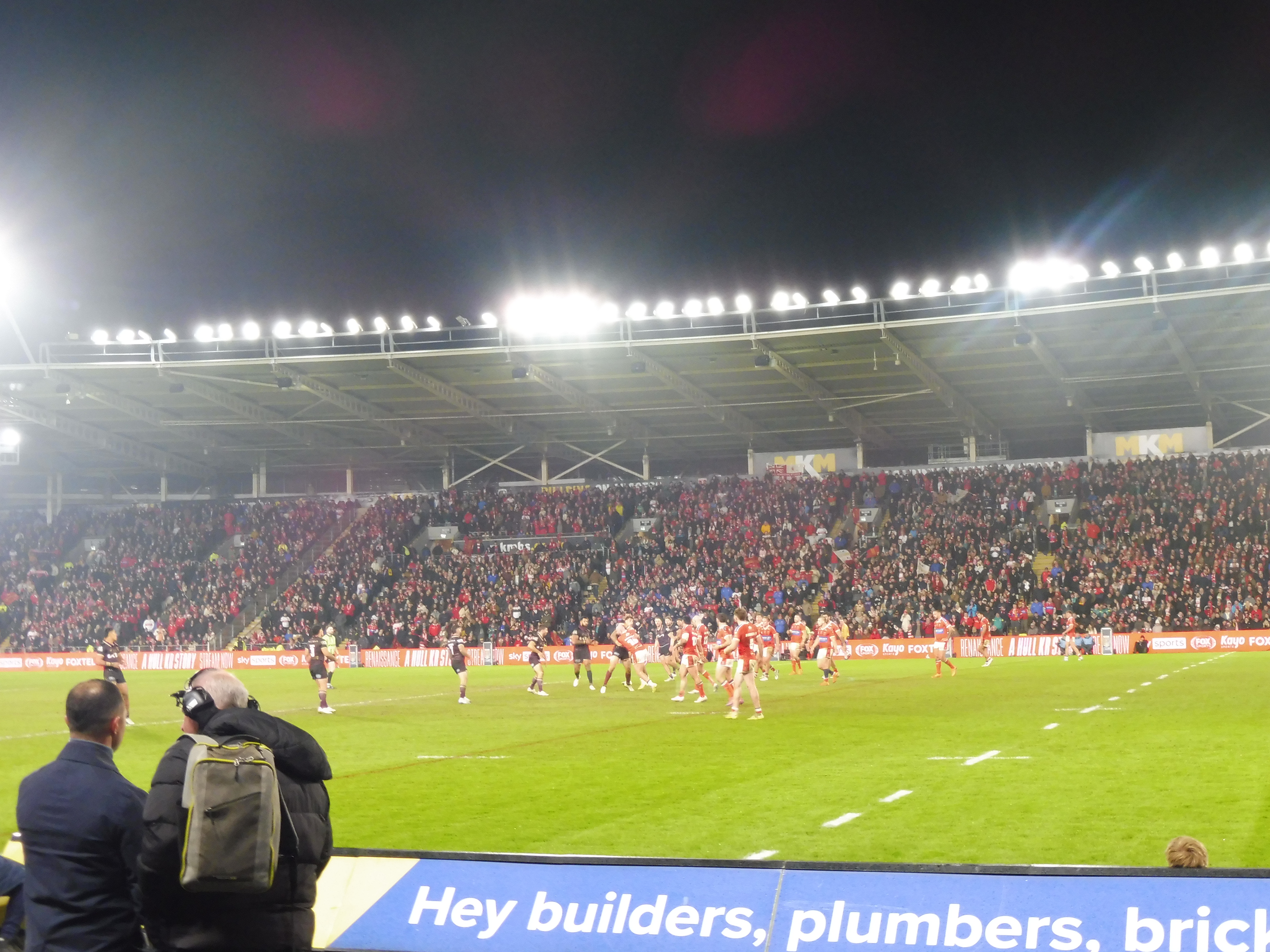
Action in the final minute of the game

=== Details ===
19 February 2026
19:30 GMT

Hull KR	30–24	Brisbane Broncos
Tries: 5 Amone 5'; Minchella 12'; Burgess 21'; Gildart 49'; Hiku 55'; Goals: 5 Mourgue 2/2 7', 13'; Martin 3/3 22', 51', 56'	1st: 18–4; 2nd: 12–20; Report	Tries: 5 Shibasaki 28', 65'; Carrigan 60'; Mariner 62'; Staggs 76'; Goals: 2 Reynolds 2/5 61', 63'

MKM Stadium, Hull
Attendance: 24,600
Referee: Liam Moore (England)
Touch judges: Matty Lynn (England), Richard Thompson (England)
Player of the Match: Jez Litten

Team details
Hull KR		Position	Brisbane Broncos
Name	Number	Position	Number	Name
Arthur Mourgue 7', 13', (substituted off) 33'	1	Fullback	1	Reece Walsh
Tom Davies	2	Wing	2	Josiah Karapani
Peta Hiku	3	Centre	3	Kotoni Staggs 76'
Oliver Gildart	4	Centre	4	Gehamat Shibasaki 28', 65'
Joe Burgess	5	Wing	5	Deine Mariner 62'
Mikey Lewis	6	Stand off/Five eighth	6	Ezra Mam
Tyrone May	7	Scrum half/Half back	7	Adam Reynolds 61', 63'
Sauaso Sue (substituted off) 18', (substituted on) 33', (substituted off) 47'	8	Prop forward	8	Corey Jensen (substituted off) 2', (substituted on) 25', (substituted off) 48', (substituted on) 74'
Jez Litten	9	Hooker	9	Cory Paix (substituted off) 44'
Tom Amone (substituted off) 18', (substituted on) 58', (substituted off) 64'	10	Prop forward	10	Payne Haas
Dean Hadley	11	Second row	11	Jack Gosiewski (substituted off) 60', (substituted on) 74'
James Batchelor	12	Second row	12	Jordan Riki
Elliot Minchella (substituted off) 31', (substituted on) 75'	13	Loose forward/Lock forward	13	Patrick Carrigan 60'
Sam Luckley	15	Interchange	14	Ben Hunt (substituted on) 44'
Jai Whitbread (substituted on) 18', (substituted on) 75'	16	Interchange	15	Xavier Willison (substituted on) 2', (substituted off) 60'
Rhyse Martin (substituted on) 18' (goal) 22', 51', 56'	17	Interchange	16	Ben Talty (substituted on) 48'
Karl Lawton (substituted on) 31', (substituted off) 75'	19	Interchange	17	Aublix Tawha (substituted on) 25'
Jack Brown	18	Interchange	18	Grant Anderson
(Australia) Willie Peters		Coach		(Australia) Michael Maguire

== Post-match ==
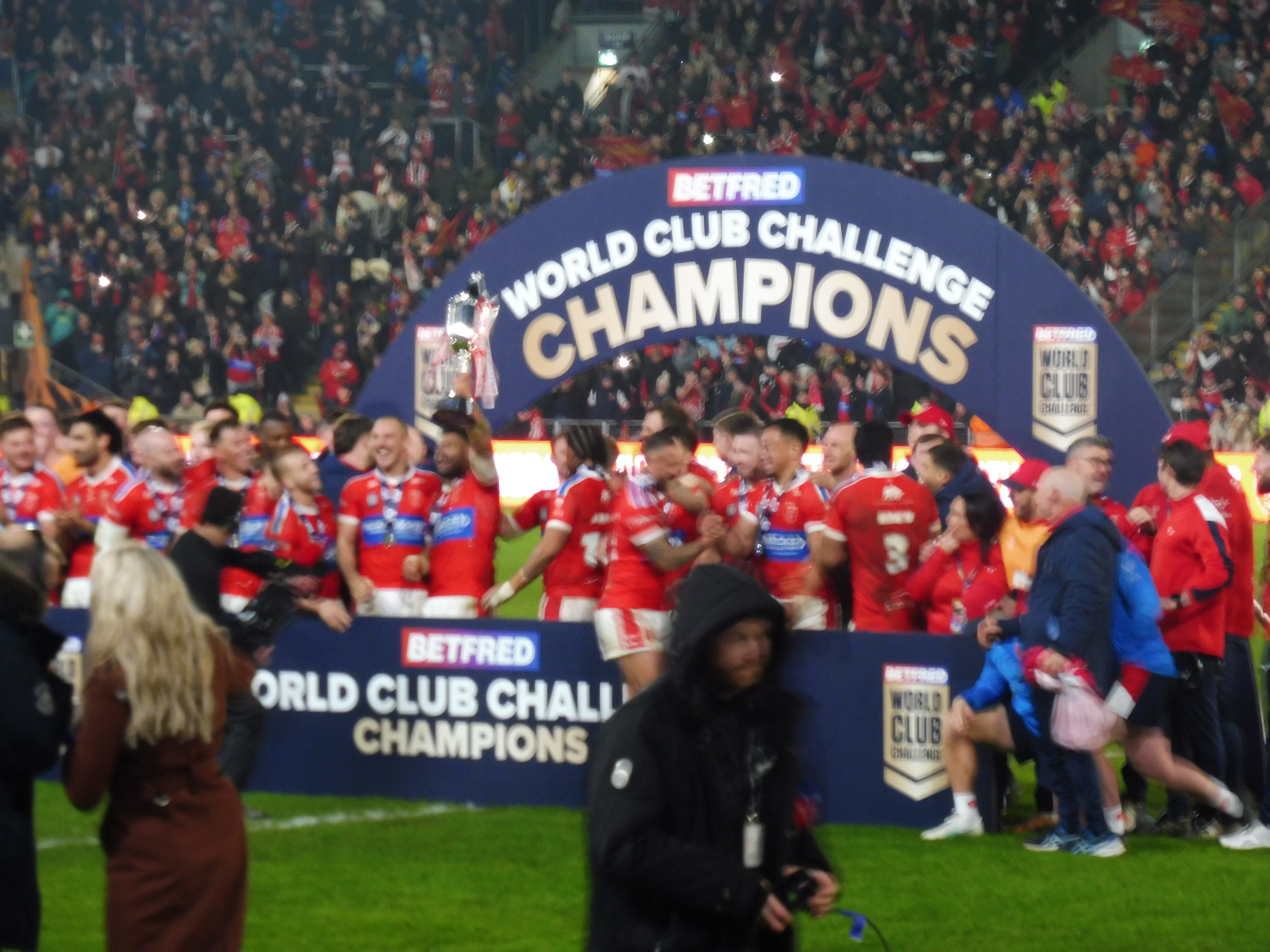
Hull Kingston Rovers lifting the World Club Challenge trophy
