= 2023 Brisbane Broncos season =

NRL rugby league season

- NRL Rank: 2nd
- Play-off result: Runners-up (24-26 v Penrith Panthers)
- 2023 record: Wins: 18; losses: 6
- Points scored: For: 639; against: 425

Team information
- CEO: Dave Donaghy
- Coach: Kevin Walters
- Captain: Adam Reynolds (23 games) Kurt Capewell (5 games) Thomas Flegler (1 game)
- Stadium: Suncorp Stadium (52,500 – 11 games); The Gabba (41,974 – 3 games)
- Avg. attendance: 405,520
- High attendance: 43,271 (Round 27 v Storm)
- Low attendance: 21,841 (Round 22 v Roosters)

Top scorers
- Tries: Selwyn Cobbo (20)
- Goals: Adam Reynolds (94)
- Points: Adam Reynolds (212)
← 2022	List of seasons	2024 →

The 2023 Brisbane Broncos season was the 36th in the club's rugby league football history.

At the start of the final round (27) of the regular season, Brisbane was positioned on top of the NRL ladder. Having qualified for the finals, a significant number of regular players were rested. The Melbourne Storm subsequently won 32-22 at Suncorp Stadium and by the end of round 27, Brisbane missed out on their first minor premiership win since 2000 due to a lesser points differential than the Penrith Panthers. Notwithstanding, Brisbane qualified to play Penrith in the 2023 NRL Grand Final at Accor Stadium on 1 October; however, Brisbane conceded the largest comeback in NRL Grand Final history in the final twenty minutes to lose 24-26.

The Broncos also fielded a team in the NRL Women's Premiership.

== Player movement ==
The following player movements happened across the previous season, off-season and pre-season.

=== Gains ===
Player	Previous club	Length
Reece Walsh	New Zealand Warriors	2025
Jesse Arthars	New Zealand Warriors	2023
Jock Madden	Wests Tigers	2024
Martin Taupau	Manly Warringah Sea Eagles	2023

=== Losses ===
Player	New Club
Brenko Lee	Dolphins
David Mead	Retired
Te Maire Martin	New Zealand Warriors
Ryan James	Retired
Tyson Gamble	Newcastle Knights
Jake Turpin	Sydney Roosters
Zac Hosking	Penrith Panthers
Tesi Niu	Dolphins
Karl Oloapu	Canterbury-Bankstown Bulldogs
TC Robati	Released

== Pre-Season Challenge ==
Date	Round	Opponent	Venue	Score	Tries	Goals	Attendance
Sunday, 12 February	Trial 1	Gold Coast Titans	Sunshine Coast Stadium	24–24	Reece Walsh 5'; Deine Mariner 27'; Jordan Pereira 37', 40'	Kotoni Staggs (2/2); Reece Walsh (2/2)	4,605
Saturday, 18 February	Trial 2	North Queensland Cowboys	Sunshine Coast Stadium	20–8	Kurt Capewell 2'; Selwyn Cobbo 7'; Corey Oates 22'; Jesse Arthars 70'	Kotoni Staggs (2/4)	7,849

== Regular season ==
=== Ladder ===
2023 NRL season
Pos	Team	Pld	W	D	L	B	PF	PA	PD	Pts
1	Penrith Panthers (P)	24	18	0	6	3	645	312	+333	42
2	Brisbane Broncos	24	18	0	6	3	639	425	+214	42
3	Melbourne Storm	24	16	0	8	3	627	459	+168	38
4	New Zealand Warriors	24	16	0	8	3	572	448	+124	38
5	Newcastle Knights	24	14	1	9	3	626	451	+175	35
6	Cronulla-Sutherland Sharks	24	14	0	10	3	619	497	+122	34
7	Sydney Roosters	24	13	0	11	3	472	496	−24	32
8	Canberra Raiders	24	13	0	11	3	486	623	−137	32
9	South Sydney Rabbitohs	24	12	0	12	3	564	505	+59	30
10	Parramatta Eels	24	12	0	12	3	587	574	+13	30
11	North Queensland Cowboys	24	12	0	12	3	546	542	+4	30
12	Manly Warringah Sea Eagles	24	11	1	12	3	545	539	+6	29
13	Dolphins	24	9	0	15	3	520	631	−111	24
14	Gold Coast Titans	24	9	0	15	3	527	653	−126	24
15	Canterbury-Bankstown Bulldogs	24	7	0	17	3	438	769	−331	20
16	St. George Illawarra Dragons	24	5	0	19	3	474	673	−199	16
17	Wests Tigers	24	4	0	20	3	385	675	−290	14

=== Result by round ===
Round	1	2	3	4	5	6	7	8	9	10	11	12	13	14	15	16	17	18	19	20	21	22	23	24	25	26	27
Ground	A	H	H	A	H	H	A	A	H	N	A	H	A	A	H	–	H	H	–	A	A	H	A	H	–	A	H
Result	W	W	W	W	W	L	W	W	L	W	L	L	W	W	W	B	L	W	B	W	W	W	W	W	B	W	L
Position	7	4	1	1	1	1	1	1	1	1	2	4	3	2	2	1	2	2	2	2	2	2	2	2	2	1	2
Points	2	4	6	8	10	10	12	14	14	16	16	16	18	20	22	24	24	26	28	30	32	34	36	38	40	42	42

Source: National Rugby League
A = Away; H = Home; N = Neutral; B = Bye; W = Win; D = Draw; L = Loss

=== Matches ===
Round 1: 3 March 2023	Penrith Panthers	12–13	Brisbane Broncos	Penrith
20:05 AEDT	Tries: Crichton 7'; Luke 76'; Goals: Cleary 2/2 8', 76'	[Report Report]	Tries: Farnworth 15', 19'; Goals: Reynolds 2/2 17', 21'; Field goals: Reynolds 70'	Stadium: BlueBet Stadium; Attendance: 17,125; Referee: Gerard Sutton

Round 2: 10 March 2023	Brisbane Broncos	28–16	North Queensland Cowboys	Brisbane
20:05 AEST	Tries: Capewell 33'; Mam 39', 49'; Staggs 44'; Walsh 76'; Goals: Reynolds 4/6 34', 51', 69 (pen)', 77'	[Report Report]	Tries: Nanai 4', 72'; Goals: Holmes 4/4 5', 18 (pen)', 37 (pen)', 73'; Sin bin: Drinkwater (yellow card) 43' to 53'	Stadium: Suncorp Stadium; Attendance: 43,162; Referee: Ashley Klein

Round 3: 18 March 2023	Brisbane Broncos	40–18	St. George Illawarra Dragons	Brisbane
20:05 AEST	Tries: Staggs 18', 47'; Paix 43'; Cobbo 70'; Walsh 73', 78'; Mam 75'; Goals: Reynolds 5/7 20', 44', 72', 76', 78'	[Report Report]	Tries: Feagai 6'; Sloan 27'; Sullivan 33'; Goals: Lomax 3/5 28', 34', 59 (pen)' Field goals: Reynolds 39 (2pt)'	Stadium: Suncorp Stadium; Attendance: 26,612; Referee: Peter Gough

Round 4: 24 March 2023	Dolphins	12–18	Brisbane Broncos	Brisbane
20:00 AEST	Tries: Wallace 56'; Tabuai-Fidow 62'; Goals: Isaako 2/2 57', 64'	[Report Report]	Tries: Arthars 22'; Cobbo 49'; Capewell 69'; Staggs 77'; Goals: Reynolds 1/4 71'	Stadium: Suncorp Stadium; Attendance: 51,047; Referee: Adam Gee

Round 5: 1 April 2023	Brisbane Broncos	46–12	Wests Tigers	Brisbane
19:35 AEST	Tries: Riki 9', 33'; Capewell 14'; Haas 19'; Cobbo 29'; Farnworth 46'; Staggs 52', 78'; Goals: Reynolds 7/8 16', 20', 30', 35', 48', 53', 79'	[Report Report]	Tries: Papali'i 43'; Simpkin 63'; Goals: Doueihi 2/2 44', 64'	Stadium: Suncorp Stadium; Attendance: 27,553; Referee: Chris Sutton

Round 6: 8 April 2023	Brisbane Broncos	14–20	Canberra Raiders	Brisbane
19:35 AEST	Tries: Cobbo 14'; Riki 42'; Arthars 70'; Goals: Reynolds 1/3 44'	[Report Report]	Tries: Rapana 4', 29'; Hopoate 50'; Goals: Croker 4/4 6', 31', 38 (pen)', 52'	Stadium: Suncorp Stadium; Attendance: 31,962; Referee: Grant Atkins

Round 7: 15 April 2023	Gold Coast Titans	26–43	Brisbane Broncos	Gold Coast
19:35 AEST	Tries: Sami 4'; Khan-Pereira 22', 79'; Leeming 69'; Goals: Boyd 5/5 5', 23', 31 (pen)', 70', 80'; Sin bin: T. Fa'asuamaleaui (yellow card) 61' to 71'	[Report Report]	Tries: Riki 3'; Farnworth 39'; Walsh 50'; Arthars 55'; Capewell 63'; Mam 66'; Cobbo 75'; Goals: Reynolds 7/8 16', 51', 57', 61 (pen)', 65', 67', 76'; Field goals: Reynolds 79'	Stadium: Cbus Super Stadium; Attendance: 26,563; Referee: Todd Smith

Round 8: 21 April 2023	Parramatta Eels	16–26	Brisbane Broncos	Darwin
19:30 ACST	Tries: Gutherson 19'; Sivo 58'; Russell 63'; Goals: Moses 2/3 21', 60'; Sin bin: Hopgood (yellow card) 46' to 56'	[Report Report]	Tries: Farnworth 14'; Reynolds 23'; Mam 25'; Staggs 32'; Goals: Reynolds 5/7 4 (pen)', 24', 27', 46 (pen)', 55 (pen)' Sin bin: Mam (yellow card) 62' to 72'	Stadium: TIO Stadium; Attendance: 11,864; Referee: Ashley Klein

Round 9: 28 April 2023	Brisbane Broncos	6–32	South Sydney Rabbitohs	Brisbane
20:00 AEST	Tries: Arthars 11'; Goals: Reynolds 1/2 4 (pen)' Sin bin: Farnworth (yellow card) 45' to 55'	[Report Report]	Tries: Graham 6', 35', 48'; Mitchell 42', 67'; Walker 57'; Goals: Mitchell 4/6 8', 36', 44', 58'; Sin bin: Murray (yellow card) 4' to 14'	Stadium: Suncorp Stadium; Attendance: 40,102; Referee: Ashley Klein

Round 10: 5 May 2023	Manly Warringah Sea Eagles	6–32	Brisbane Broncos	Brisbane
20:05 AEST	Tries: B. Trbojevic 77'; Goals: Garrick 1/1 77'	[Report Report]	Tries: Cobbo 9', 22', 69'; Walters 13'; Arthars 34'; Farnworth 72'; Goals: Reynolds 4/6 15', 24', 71', 74'	Stadium: Suncorp Stadium; Attendance: 50,077; Referee: Gerard Sutton

Round 11: 11 May 2023	Melbourne Storm	24–16	Brisbane Broncos	Melbourne
19:50 AEST	Tries: Munster 11'; Warbrick 38', 74'; Olam 60'; Goals: Meaney 4/6 12', 56 (pen)', 66 (pen)', 75'; Sin bin: Pene (yellow card) 77' to 80'	[Report Report]	Tries: Farnworth 16'; Arthars 23'; Paix 77'; Goals: Walsh 2/3 16', 77'; Sin bin: Farnworth (yellow card) 37' to 47'; Carrigan (yellow card) 55' to 65'; Flegler (yellow card) 77' to 80'	Stadium: AAMI Park; Attendance: 16,043; Referee: Todd Smith

Round 12: 18 May 2023	Brisbane Broncos	4–15	Penrith Panthers	Brisbane
19:50 AEST	Tries: Cobbo 58'; Goals: Staggs 0/1	[Report Report]	Tries: Turuva 12'; Cleary 49'; Goals: Cleary 3/3 13', 22 (pen)', 50'; Field goals: Cleary 79'	Stadium: Suncorp Stadium; Attendance: 33,343; Referee: Adam Gee

Round 13: 27 May 2023	New Zealand Warriors	22–26	Brisbane Broncos	Napier
19:30 NZST	Tries: Watene-Zelezniak 36', 61'; Nicoll-Klokstad 74'; Montoya 77'; Goals: Johnson 3/4 37', 75', 77'	[Report Report]	Tries: Mariner 23', 71'; Riki 38'; Mam 53'; Goals: Reynolds 5/5 25', 40', 53', 58 (pen)', 73'	Stadium: McLean Park; Attendance: 15,600; Referee: Gerard Sutton

Round 14: 3 June 2023	Cronulla-Sutherland Sharks	12–20	Brisbane Broncos	Cronulla
19:35 AEST	Tries: Talakai 21'; Kennedy 75'; Goals: Hynes 2/2 23', 75'	[Report Report]	Tries: Staggs 5'; Mam 34'; Arthars 38'; Farnworth 67'; Goals: Reynolds 2/4 35', 68'	Stadium: PointsBet Stadium; Attendance: 12,318; Referee: Todd Smith

Round 15: 10 June 2023	Brisbane Broncos	24–20	Newcastle Knights	Brisbane
17:30 AEST	Tries: Cobbo 31', 45'; Piakura 68'; Reynolds 76'; Goals: Reynolds 4/4 33', 47', 69', 77'	[Report Report]	Tries: Young 17', 58'; Ponga 35'; Croker 54'; Goals: Hastings 2/4 36', 60'	Stadium: Suncorp Stadium; Attendance: 35,814; Referee: Chris Butler

Round 16 (Bye for Brisbane Broncos)

Round 17: 25 June 2023	Brisbane Broncos	12–18	Gold Coast Titans	Brisbane
14:00 AEST	Tries: Flegler 28'; Mam 61'; Goals: Reynolds 2/2 29', 62'	[Report Report]	Tries: D. Fifita 38'; Kelly 43'; Khan-Pereira 52'; Goals: Boyd 3/4 40', 53', 74 (pen)'	Stadium: Suncorp Stadium; Attendance: 42,249; Referee: Chris Butler

Round 18: 1 July 2023	Brisbane Broncos	24–16	Dolphins	Brisbane
19:35 AEST	Tries: Cobbo 7', 68', 77'; Farnworth 21', 27'; Goals: Reynolds 2/5 23', 70'	[Report Report]	Tries: Nikorima 25'; Te Whare 50'; Marshall-King 63'; Goals: Isaako 2/3 26', 64'	Stadium: The Gabba; Attendance: 30,606; Referee: Peter Gough

Round 19 (Bye for Brisbane Broncos)

Round 20: 15 July 2023	Canterbury-Bankstown Bulldogs	24–44	Brisbane Broncos	Belmore
15:00 AEST	Tries: Preston 2'; Averillo 24', 29'; Waddell 77'; Goals: Burton 4/4 4', 25', 31', 78'	[Report Report]	Tries: Reynolds 13'; Capewell 18'; Walters 26'; Mariner 35'; Willison 43'; Mam 58'; Piakura 68'; Farnworth 79'; Goals: Reynolds 6/8 15', 19', 27', 44', 60', 70'; Sin bin: Cobbo (yellow card) 38' to 48'	Stadium: Belmore Sports Ground; Attendance: 17,103; Referee: Ziggy Przeklasa-Adamski

Round 21: 21 July 2023	South Sydney Rabbitohs	20–36	Brisbane Broncos	Sunshine Coast
20:00 AEST	Tries: Johnston 5'; Graham 40'; Tass 68'; Goals: Taaffe 4/4 7', 13 (pen)', 40', 69'	[Report Report]	Tries: Staggs 9', 61'; Cobbo 23'; Walsh 50'; Willison 57'; Reynolds 74'; Goals: Reynolds 6/6 11', 24', 51', 58', 62', 75'; Sin bin: Taupau (yellow card) 12' to 22'; Arthars (yellow card) 68' to 78'	Stadium: Sunshine Coast Stadium; Attendance: 8,931; Referee: Ashley Klein

Round 22: 27 July 2023	Brisbane Broncos	32–10	Sydney Roosters	Brisbane
19:50 AEST	Tries: Farnworth 4'; Mam 14', 77'; Carrigan 34'; Staggs 67'; Goals: Reynolds 6/6 6', 16', 25 (pen)', 36', 69', 79'	[Report Report]	Tries: Bi. Smith 65'; Tupou 70'; Goals: S. Smith 1/2 71'	Stadium: The Gabba; Attendance: 21,841; Referee: Grant Atkins

Round 23: 5 August 2023	North Queensland Cowboys	14–30	Brisbane Broncos	Townsville
15:00 AEST	Tries: Feldt 12', 58'; Luki 74'; Goals: Townsend 1/4 40 (pen)'	[Report Report]	Tries: Arthars 6'; Carrigan 23'; Mam 52'; Walsh 72'; Cobbo 78'; Goals: Staggs 5/6 7', 25', 47 (pen)', 54', 80'	Stadium: Queensland Country Bank Stadium; Attendance: 22,659; Referee: Gerard Sutton

Round 24: 11 August 2023	Brisbane Broncos	54–10	Parramatta Eels	Brisbane
20:00 AEST	Tries: Reynolds 19'; Walters 26', 52'; Mariner 30', 43'; Farnworth 38'; Mam 43'; Capewell 66'; Walsh 73'; Goals: Reynolds 9/10 6 (pen)', 21', 28', 39', 44', 47', 53', 67', 74'	[Report Report]	Tries: Russell 63'; Brown 69'; Goals: Gutherson 1/2 70'	Stadium: The Gabba; Attendance: 29,005; Referee: Adam Gee

Round 25 (Bye for Brisbane Broncos)

Round 26: 26 August 2023	Canberra Raiders	18–29	Brisbane Broncos	Canberra
19:35 AEST	Tries: Frawley 17'; Cotric 31'; Young 37'; Goals: Fogarty 3/4 18', 38', 44 (pen)' Sin bin: Rapana (yellow card) 63' to 73'	[Report Report]	Tries: Cobbo 4', 61', 67'; Staggs 26'; Mam 34'; Walsh 76'; Goals: Staggs 2/6 27', 35'; Field goals: Walsh 74'	Stadium: GIO Stadium; Attendance: 19,400; Referee: Adam Gee

Round 27: 31 August 2023	Brisbane Broncos	22–32	Melbourne Storm	Brisbane
19:50 AEST	Tries: Flegler 3'; Pereira 12', 41'; Goals: Rogers 5/5 4', 13', 43', 44 (pen)', 58'	[Report Report]	Tries: Anderson 16', 32'; Fa'alogo 36', 72'; Papenhuyzen 54'; Smith 68'; Goals: Papenhuyzen 4/6 33', 56', 69', 73'; Sin bin: Smith (yellow card) 57' to 67'	Stadium: Suncorp Stadium; Attendance: 43,271; Referee: Ashley Klein

=== Finals series ===
Qualifying and elimination finals
9 September – Sydney
1	Penrith	32
4	New Zealand	6
10 September – Newcastle
5	Newcastle	30
8	Canberra	28
9 September – Sydney
6	Cronulla-Sutherland	12
7	Sydney	13
8 September – Brisbane
2	Brisbane	26
3	Melbourne	0

Semi-finals
16 September – Auckland
New Zealand	40
Newcastle	10
15 September – Melbourne
Melbourne	18
Sydney	13

Preliminary finals
22 September – Sydney
Penrith	38
Melbourne	4
23 September – Brisbane
Brisbane	42
New Zealand	12

Grand final
1 October – Sydney
Penrith	26
Brisbane	24

QEF: 8 September 2023	Brisbane Broncos	26–0	Melbourne Storm	Brisbane
19:50 AEST	Tries: Staggs 7'; Walsh 50'; Riki 53'; Cobbo 73'; Goals: Reynolds 5/5 8', 38 (pen)', 51', 54', 74'	[Report Report]		Stadium: Suncorp Stadium; Attendance: 50,197; Referee: Grant Atkins

PF: 23 September 2023	Brisbane Broncos	42–12	New Zealand Warriors	Brisbane
19:50 AEST	Tries: Walters 7', 23'; Farnworth 16', 69'; Arthars 18'; Riki 54'; Mam 59'; Goals: Reynolds 6/6 8', 17', 20', 24', 55', 61'; Walsh 1/1 70'	[Report Report]	Tries: Watene-Zelezniak 4', 11'; Montoya 28'; Goals: Pompey 0/3; Sin bin: Pompey (yellow card) 58' to 68'	Stadium: Suncorp Stadium; Attendance: 52,273; Referee: Gerard Sutton

GF: 1 October 2023	Penrith Panthers	26–24	Brisbane Broncos	Sydney Olympic Park
19:30 AEDT	Tries: Kenny 17'; Leota 62'; Crichton 67'; Cleary 76'; Goals: Crichton 1/1 18'; Cleary 4/4 29 (pen)', 63', 68', 78'	[Report Report]	Tries: Flegler 38'; Mam 44', 52', 54'; Goals: Reynolds 4/4 39', 45', 53', 56'	Stadium: Accor Stadium; Attendance: 81,947; Referee: Adam Gee

== Squad ==
Brisbane Broncos 2023 squad
Top 30 squad - 2023 NRL season			Development list	Coaching staff
Jesse Arthars – WG, CE; Logan Bayliss-Brow – PR; Kurt Capewell (vc) – SR; Patrick Carrigan – LK, SR; Selwyn Cobbo – WG, FB; Herbie Farnworth – CE; Thomas Flegler – PR; Payne Haas – PR; Kobe Hetherington – LK; Delouise Hoeter – CE	Corey Jensen – PR; Jock Madden – HB, FE; Ezra Mam – FE; Deine Mariner – WG; Blake Mozer – HK; Corey Oates – WG; Cory Paix – HK; Keenan Palasia – PR, LK; Jordan Pereira – WG; Brendan Piakura – SR	Adam Reynolds (c) – HB; Jordan Riki – SR; Kotoni Staggs – CE; Martin Taupau – PR; Reece Walsh – FB; Billy Walters – HK; Xavier Willison – PR	Brendan Frei – SR; Josh Rogers – FE; Tristan Sailor – FB; Tyson Smoothy – HK; Extended squad: Israel Leota – WG; Ben Te Kura – PR	Head coach: Kevin Walters; Assistant coaches: Matt Ballin; John Cartwright; Darius Boyd; Dave Ballard (Head Of Performance); Brett O'Farrell (Contact Coach); Lee Briers (Development Coach); Legend: (c) Captain(s); (vc) Vice-captain(s); Updated: 25 February 2023; Source(s): Broncos Team Profiles

== Club Awards ==
2023 Brisbane Broncos Club Awards

- Paul Morgan Award: Payne Haas
- Kevin Walters most consistent player award: Payne Haas
- Shane Webcke best forward award: Payne Haas
- Allan Langer best back award: Reece Walsh
- Gary Balkin players' player award: Payne Haas
- Cyril Connell rookie of the year award: Tristan Sailor
- Wally Lewis play of the year award: Kotoni Staggs - Round 4, length of the field try against Dolphins
- Community service award: Patrick Carrigan
