= Tom Duffy (rugby league) =

Australian rugby league footballer

Personal information
- Full name: Thomas Duffy
- Born: 22 July 2003 (age 23) Townsville, Queensland, Australia
- Height: 180 cm (5 ft 11 in)
- Weight: 87 kg (13 st 10 lb)

Playing information
- Position: Halfback, Five-eighth
Club
Years	Team	Pld	T	G	FG	P
2025	Nth Qld Cowboys	6	0	1	0	2
2026–	Brisbane Broncos	10	1	15	1	35
	Total	16	1	16	1	37
- Source: As of 6 November 2026
- Education: Ignatius Park College

Tom Duffy (born 22 July 2003) is an Australian professional rugby league footballer who plays as a halfback for the Brisbane Broncos in the National Rugby League.

He previously played for the North Queensland Cowboys in the NRL.

== Background ==
Born in Townsville, Queensland, Duffy played his junior rugby league for the Centrals ASA Tigers.

He attended Ignatius Park College, where he was selected for the Australian Schoolboys in 2021, before being signed by the North Queensland Cowboys.

== Playing career ==
=== Early career ===
In 2020 and 2021, Duffy played for the Townsville Blackhawks in the Mal Meninga Cup. In 2021, he started at halfback in their Grand Final loss to the Tweed Seagulls. Later that year, he made his under-21 Colts debut for the Blackhawks.

In 2022, he joined the Cowboys' Young Guns program. That season, he represented Queensland Under-19 and started at halfback in Townsville's under-21 Grand Final victory over the Redcliffe Dolphins.

In 2023, he moved into the Cowboys' NRL squad on a development contract. He spent the entire season in the Queensland Cup, playing 20 games for Townsville. On 5 July 2023, he re-signed with the Cowboys for two seasons.

In 2024, he was promoted to the Cowboys' Top 30 squad. He played 22 games for the Northern Pride, winning Halfback of the Year at the QRL's end of season awards.

=== 2025 ===
In Round 1 of the 2025 NRL season, Duffy was named to make his NRL debut at halfback for the Cowboys against the Manly Sea Eagles.

=== 2026 ===
Duffy played his first game for the Brisbane Broncos in the round 6 clash against North Queensland Cowboys, becoming the 300th player to debut for the club. Duffy kicked five goals and one drop goal in the 31-35 loss. On 16 June, the Brisbane outfit announced that Duffy had re-signed with the club for a further two years. Duffy played ten games for Brisbane in the 2026 NRL season as the club finished 14th on the table.
