= Preston Riki =

New Zealand rugby league footballer

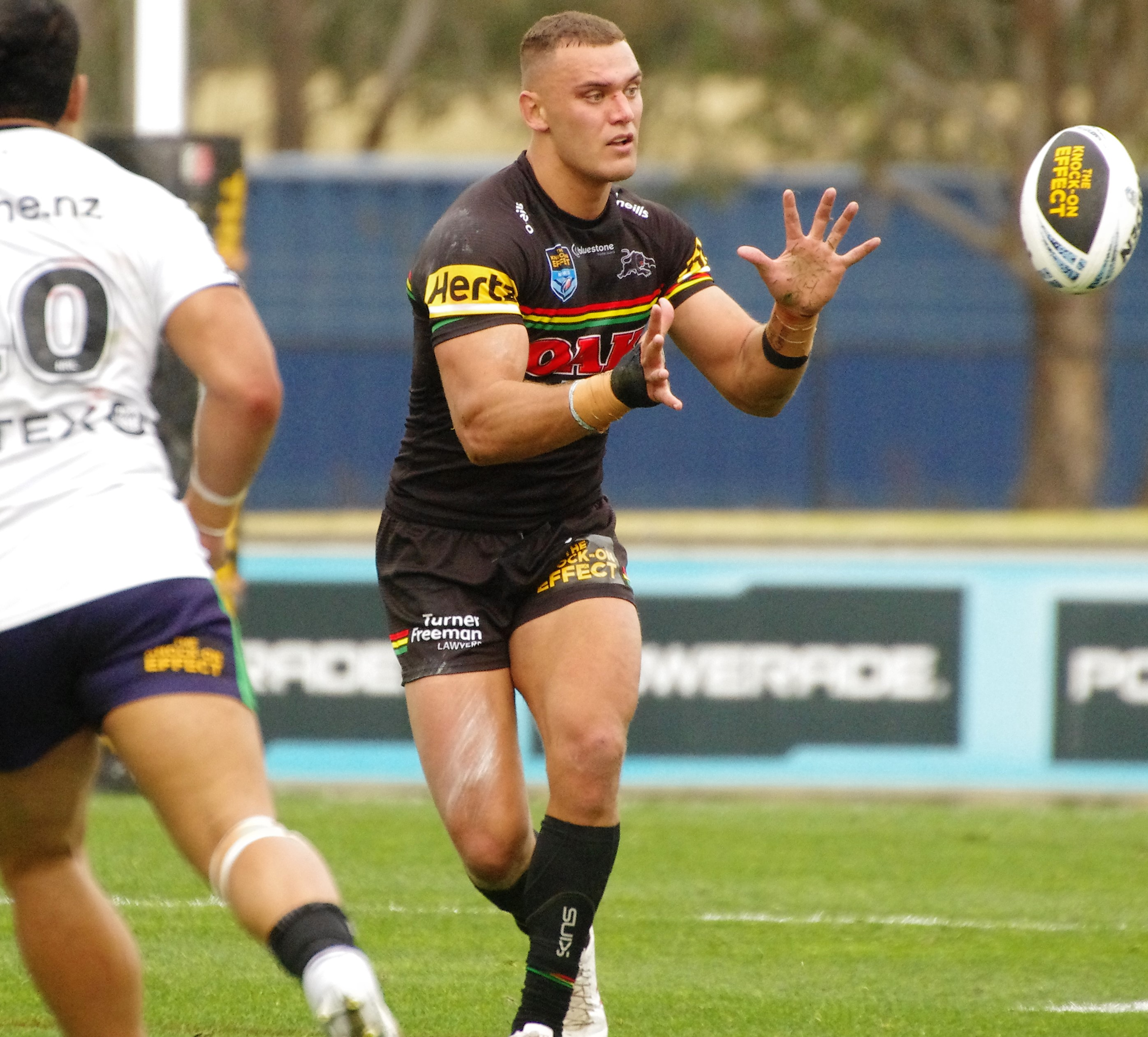

Personal information
- Full name: Preston Riki
- Born: 24 March 1998 (age 28) Rawene, Northland Region, New Zealand
- Height: 195 cm (6 ft 5 in)
- Weight: 106 kg (16 st 10 lb)

Playing information
- Position: Second-row, Prop
Club
Years	Team	Pld	T	G	FG	P
2024–25	Penrith Panthers	3	0	0	0	0
2026–	Brisbane Broncos	10	0	0	0	0
	Total	13	0	0	0	0
Representative
Years	Team	Pld	T	G	FG	P
2023–26	Māori All Stars	2	1	0	0	4
- Source: As of 25 July 2026

Preston Riki is a New Zealand rugby league footballer who plays as a prop for the Brisbane Broncos in the National Rugby League.

He previously played for the Penrith Panthers in the National Rugby League (NRL).

== Playing career ==
=== 2023 ===
In the 2023 All Stars match, Riki played for the Māori All Stars and scored a try in a 24-28 losing effort.

=== 2024 ===
Riki made his first grade debut in round 13 of the 2024 NRL season against the St. George Illawarra Dragons off the interchange bench.

=== 2025 ===
In round 26 of the 2025 NRL season, Riki was called into the Penrith side for their match against Canterbury. On 9 September, it was announced that Riki would be departing Penrith at the end of the 2025 NRL season after not being offered a new contract by the club.

=== 2026 ===
Riki joined the Brisbane Broncos on a train and trial for pre season, In round 8 of the 2026 NRL season, Riki made his club debut for the Brisbane Broncos in a 32-12 win over the Canterbury. On 22 May, the Brisbane outfit announced Riki had re-signed with the club for a further two years.
