= Phillip Coates =

PNG-born rugby league footballer

Personal information
- Born: 2006 or 2007 Papua New Guinea
- Height: 196 cm (6 ft 5 in)
- Weight: 100 kg (15 st 10 lb)

Playing information
- Position: Wing
Club
Years	Team	Pld	T	G	FG	P
2026–	Brisbane Broncos	1	0	0	0	0
- Source: RLP

Phillip Coates is a Papua New Guinean-born rugby league footballer for the Brisbane Broncos in the National Rugby League (NRL).

Coates was educated at Marymount College after moving to Australia as a young child. He is a younger brother of Melbourne Storm winger Xavier Coates and played his junior rugby league for the Currumbin Eagles.

An outside back, Coates is a product of the Broncos Academy. He represented the 2025 Queensland under-19s State of Origin side and also won a premiership that year with the Burleigh Bears in the Mal Meninga Cup.

Coates debuted in first-grade for the Broncos against the Warriors during Magic Round in 2026. A contract-extension signed early in the season secured his services until the end of the 2027 season.

A former Junior Kumuls player, Coates has expressed a desire to represent the PNG national team.
