= Antonio Verhoeven =

New Zealand rugby league footballer (born 2007)

Personal information
- Born: 7 March 2007 (age 19) New Zealand

Playing information
- Position: Wing, Centre
Club
Years	Team	Pld	T	G	FG	P
2026–	Brisbane Broncos	3	1	0	0	4
- Source: RLP

Antonio Verhoeven (born 7 March 2007) is a New Zealand rugby league footballer with the Brisbane Broncos in the National Rugby League (NRL).

== Early life ==
Verhoeven spent his early childhood in Greymouth, New Zealand, and is of Dutch and Tongan descent. He focused mainly on basketball during his youth, and continued to play the sport when he moved to St Bede's College, Christchurch in 2023, but was able to attract the attention of a Brisbane Broncos scout while representing St Bede's at the 2024 Condor rugby sevens tournament, and opted for a career in rugby league.

After relocating to Queensland, Verhoeven completed his final year of schooling at Palm Beach Currumbin State High School on the Gold Coast. He was an Australian Schoolboys representative player.

== Career ==
An outside back, Verhoeven won a Mal Meninga Cup premiership with the Burleigh Bears in 2025. Following a pre-season with the Broncos, Verhoeven began playing for Wynnum-Manly in the 2026 Queensland Cup, and a month later signed a three-year contract with the Broncos.

Verhoeven was selected as 19th man for the Broncos in round five of the 2026 NRL season against the Gold Coast Titans, making his first-grade debut when Reece Walsh was forced off the field with a facial injury.
