= Aublix Tawha =

New Zealand rugby league footballer

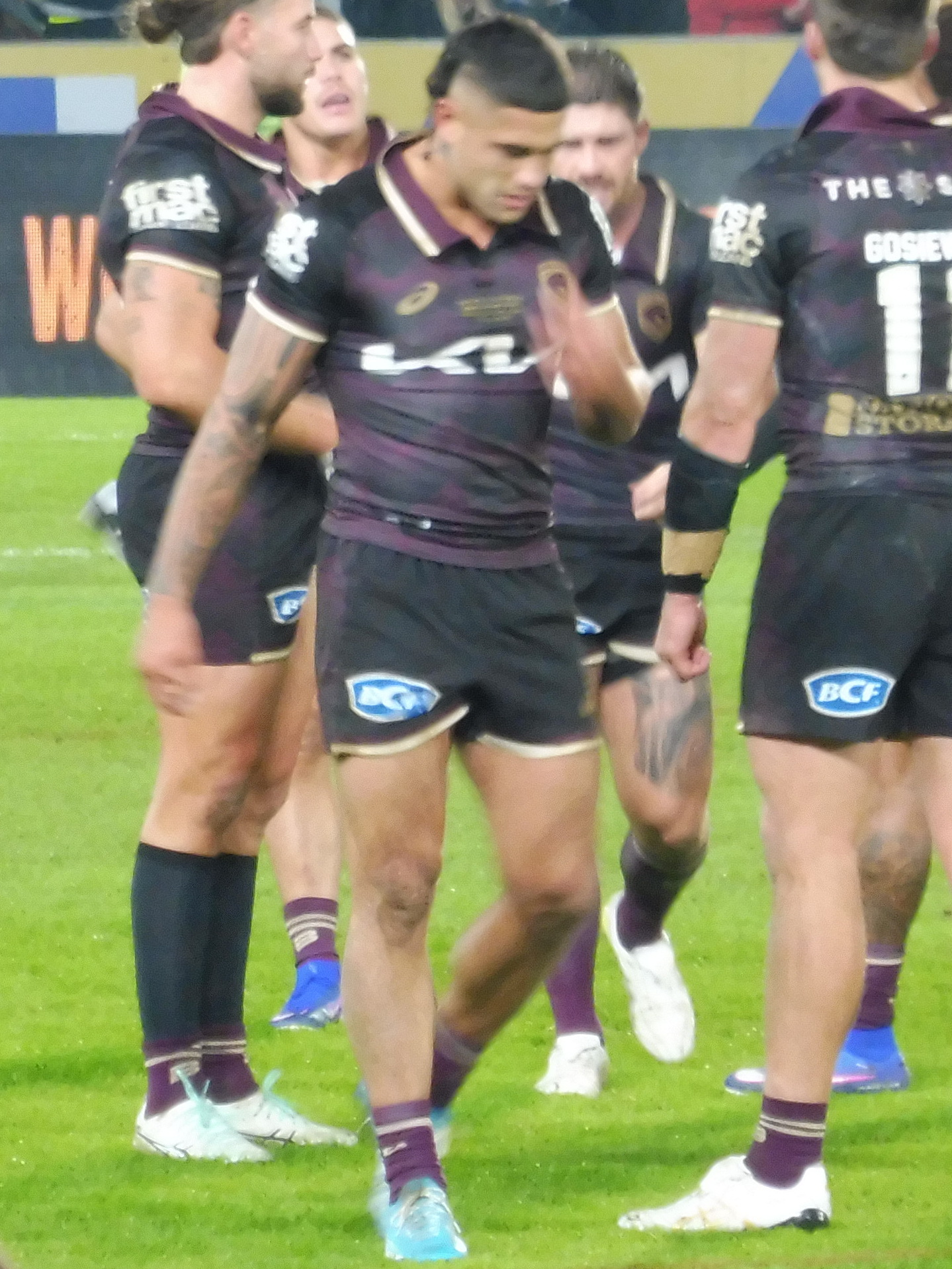

Personal information
- Born: 13 August 1999 (age 27) Hamilton, New Zealand

Playing information

Rugby union
- Position: Outside centre
Representative
Years	Team	Pld	T	G	FG	P
2022	Netherlands	2	0	0	0	0

Rugby league
- Position: Prop
Club
Years	Team	Pld	T	G	FG	P
2025	Dolphins	9	0	0	0	0
2026–	Brisbane Broncos	9	0	0	0	0
	Total	18	0	0	0	0
- Source: As of 3 September 2026

Aublix Tawha (born 13 August 1999) is a New Zealand professional rugby league footballer who plays as a prop for the Brisbane Broncos in the National Rugby League (NRL).

== Background ==
Tawha was born in Hamilton, New Zealand and is of Māori and Dutch descent. He played junior football with the Turangawaewae Rugby League Club and represented Waikato across local representative teams. In 2017, he moved to Australia to play SG Ball with the Canberra Raiders. Tawha also spent time playing local league in Canberra and New South Wales before being recruited by the Redcliffe Dolphins in the Queensland Cup in 2023.

== Playing career ==
=== Rugby union ===
Tawha played rugby union for Dutch club The Delta in the 2021–22 Rugby Europe Super Cup. In June 2022, he represented the Netherlands national rugby union team in their two mid-year fixtures against Emerging Italy and Zimbabwe.

=== Queensland Cup ===
Tawha joined the Redcliffe Dolphins in the Hostplus Cup in 2023. He played 6 games that year, followed by 18 in 2024 and another 10 in the early part of 2025, scoring a total of 14 tries and maintaining strong defensive stats.

=== NRL ===
He made his first grade debut in round 16 of the 2025 NRL season coming off the bench in a 20–26 loss to the Newcastle Knights, and later started at prop in the 50–28 victory over South Sydney in Round 17. On 19 February 2026, he played in Brisbane's World Club Challenge loss against Hull Kingston Rovers.
