= Hayze Perham =

New Zealand rugby league footballer

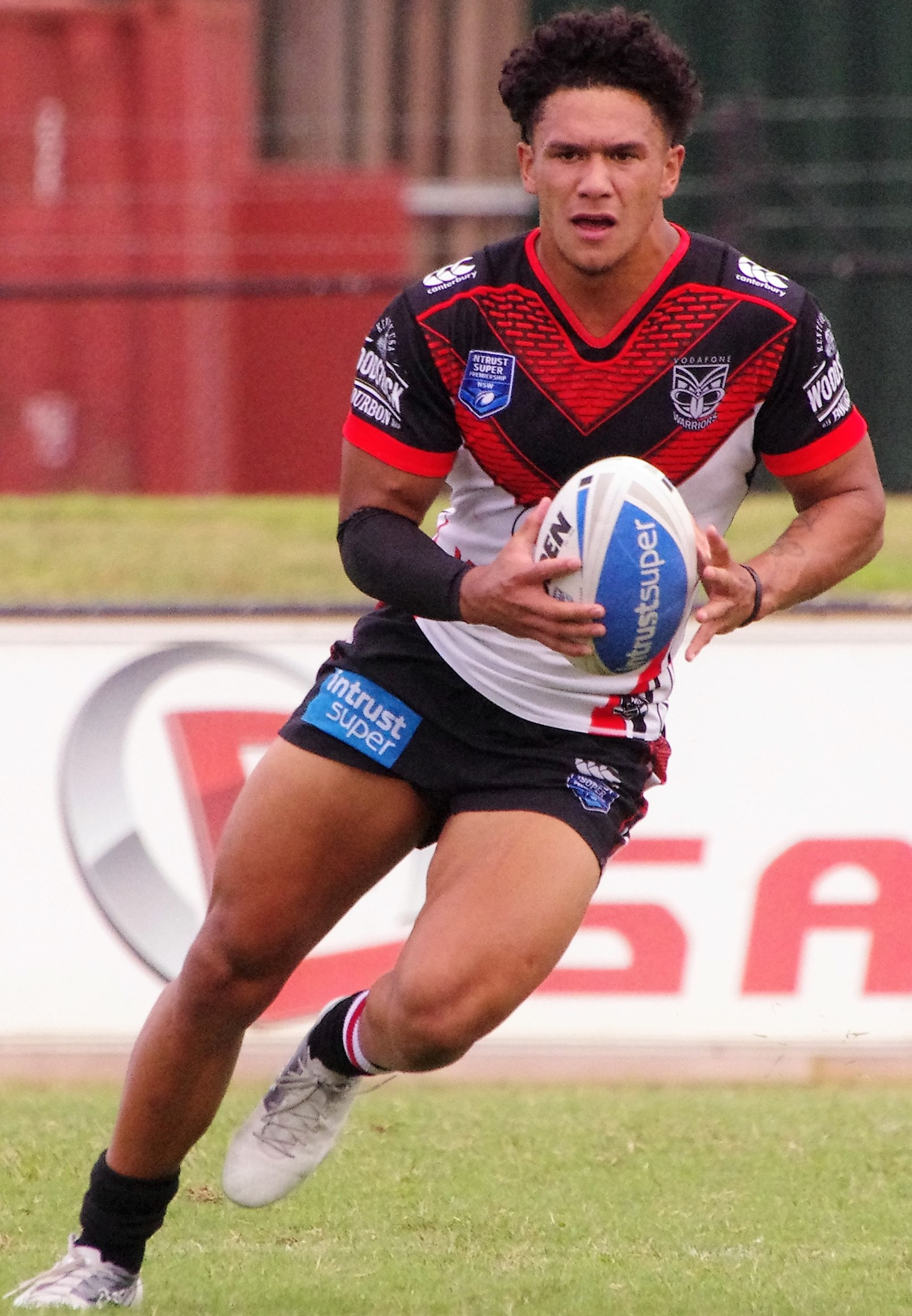

Personal information
- Born: 2 July 1999 (age 27) Taupō, Waikato, New Zealand
- Height: 185 cm (6 ft 1 in)
- Weight: 93 kg (14 st 9 lb)

Playing information
- Position: Fullback, Centre, Wing
Club
Years	Team	Pld	T	G	FG	P
2019–20	New Zealand Warriors	9	1	0	0	4
2021–22	Parramatta Eels	7	4	0	0	16
2023–24	Canterbury Bulldogs	19	3	0	0	12
2025–	Brisbane Broncos	7	2	12	0	32
	Total	42	10	12	0	64
Representative
Years	Team	Pld	T	G	FG	P
2023	Māori All Stars	1	0	0	0	0
- Source: As of 3 September 2026

Hayze Perham (born 2 July 1999) is a New Zealand professional rugby league footballer who plays as a fullback for the Brisbane Broncos in the National Rugby League (NRL).

He previously played for the Canterbury-Bankstown Bulldogs, New Zealand Warriors and the Parramatta Eels as a winger or centre in the NRL.

== Background ==
Perham was born in Taupō, New Zealand, and is of Māori descent.

== Early life ==
Perham played rugby league and rugby union at Rotorua Boys' High School.

== Career ==
=== 2019 ===
In round 7 of the 2019 NRL season, Perham made his first grade debut for the New Zealand Warriors against Melbourne at AAMI Park.

=== 2020 ===
In round 17 of the 2020 NRL season, Perham scored his first try in a 24-18 loss against the Parramatta Eels. Perham was released from his contract with the New Zealand Warriors, signing with Parramatta for the 2021 NRL season.

=== 2021 ===
In round 25 of the 2021 NRL season, he made his club debut for Parramatta in a 40-6 loss against Penrith.

=== 2022 ===
In round 7 of the 2022 NRL season, he scored his first try for Parramatta in their 39-2 victory over Newcastle. In November, Perham signed a contract to join Parramatta's arch-rivals Canterbury ahead of the 2023 NRL season.

=== 2023 ===
Perham joined the Canterbury-Bankstown Bulldogs on a 2-year deal, making his debut in their 31-6 loss to Manly in Round 1. He scored his first try for the club in their 26-22 win against the Wests Tigers in Round 3. Perham played a total of 19 matches for Canterbury in the 2023 NRL season as the club finished 15th on the table.

=== 2024 & 2025 ===
Perham made no first grade appearances for Canterbury in the 2024 NRL season. He would instead play for the clubs NSW Cup team. At the end of 2024, Perham was released by Canterbury. In 2025, during a pre-season trial game, playing for Brisbane, Perham ruptured his ACL ruling him out for the 2025 NRL season. On 12 September 2025, the Broncos announced that Perham had extended his contract with the team for a further year.

=== 2026 ===
In mid-August 2026, it was announced that Perham had signed on for a further year with the Broncos.
