= Va'a Semu =

Australian rugby league footballer (born 2004)

VJ Semu
Personal information
- Full name: Va'a Semu
- Born: 23 April 2004 (age 22)
- Height: 194 cm (6 ft 4 in)
- Weight: 110 kg (17 st 5 lb)

Playing information
- Position: Prop
Club
Years	Team	Pld	T	G	FG	P
2026–	Brisbane Broncos	13	0	0	0	0
- Source: RLP

Va'a Semu (born 23 April 2004), also known as VJ Semu, is an Australian rugby league footballer for the Brisbane Broncos in the National Rugby League (NRL).

== Early life ==
Semu began playing rugby league as an eight-year-old with the Beaudesert Kingfishers and was educated at Marsden State High School in Logan City, Queensland.

== Career ==
A prop, Semu came out of the Broncos Academy system.

Semu played in the Queensland Cup for the Souths Logan Magpies in 2024 and 2025, before moving on to the Burleigh Bears.

In the 2026 NRL season, Semu made his first-grade debut for the Broncos in their round eight win over the Bulldogs at Suncorp, and featured in a total of 13 matches throughout the year, mostly utilised off the bench. He signed a two-year contract extension during the season and was named their 2026 Rookie of the Year.
