= Coby Black =

Australian rugby league footballer (born 2006)

Personal information
- Born: 6 March 2006 (age 20) Gold Coast, Queensland, Australia
- Height: 181 cm (5 ft 11 in)
- Weight: 89 kg (14 st 0 lb)

Playing information
- Position: Halfback
Club
Years	Team	Pld	T	G	FG	P
2026–	Canberra Raiders	1	2	9	0	26
- Source: RLP

Coby Black (born 6 March 2006) is an Australian rugby league footballer for the Canberra Raiders in the National Rugby League (NRL).

== Early years ==
Black was born on the Gold Coast and attended Marsden State High School in Logan.

A halfback, Black played junior rugby league for the Helensvale Hornets, which were coached by his father, and was attached to the Brisbane Broncos Academy by his early teens. He played in the Mal Meninga Cup for the Wynnum Manly Seagulls and Burleigh Bears, notably amassing 46-points for the latter in a match against the Wide Bay Bulls in 2024.

== Rugby league career ==
Black played in the Queensland Cup for the Souths Logan Magpies in 2024 and 2025, gaining Queensland under-19s representative honours both years. He was captain of the 2025 Queensland under-19s State of Origin team.

Although earmarked by the Broncos as a potential successor to Adam Reynolds at halfback, Black requested a release from his contract at the end of 2025, on account of the Brisbane club's decision to sign Jonah Pezet. After contacting Reynolds, who gave an especially complimentary reference, the Raiders were convinced to sign the young halfback on a three-year deal.

Black made 19 NSW Cup appearances for the Raiders in 2026. In the final round of the 2026 NRL season against the Cowboys in Townsville, Black broke the league record for most points scored on debut, securing two tries and nine goals (26 points), along with two try assists. The record was previously held by Amos Roberts with 22 points.
