= Ben Talty =

England international rugby league footballer

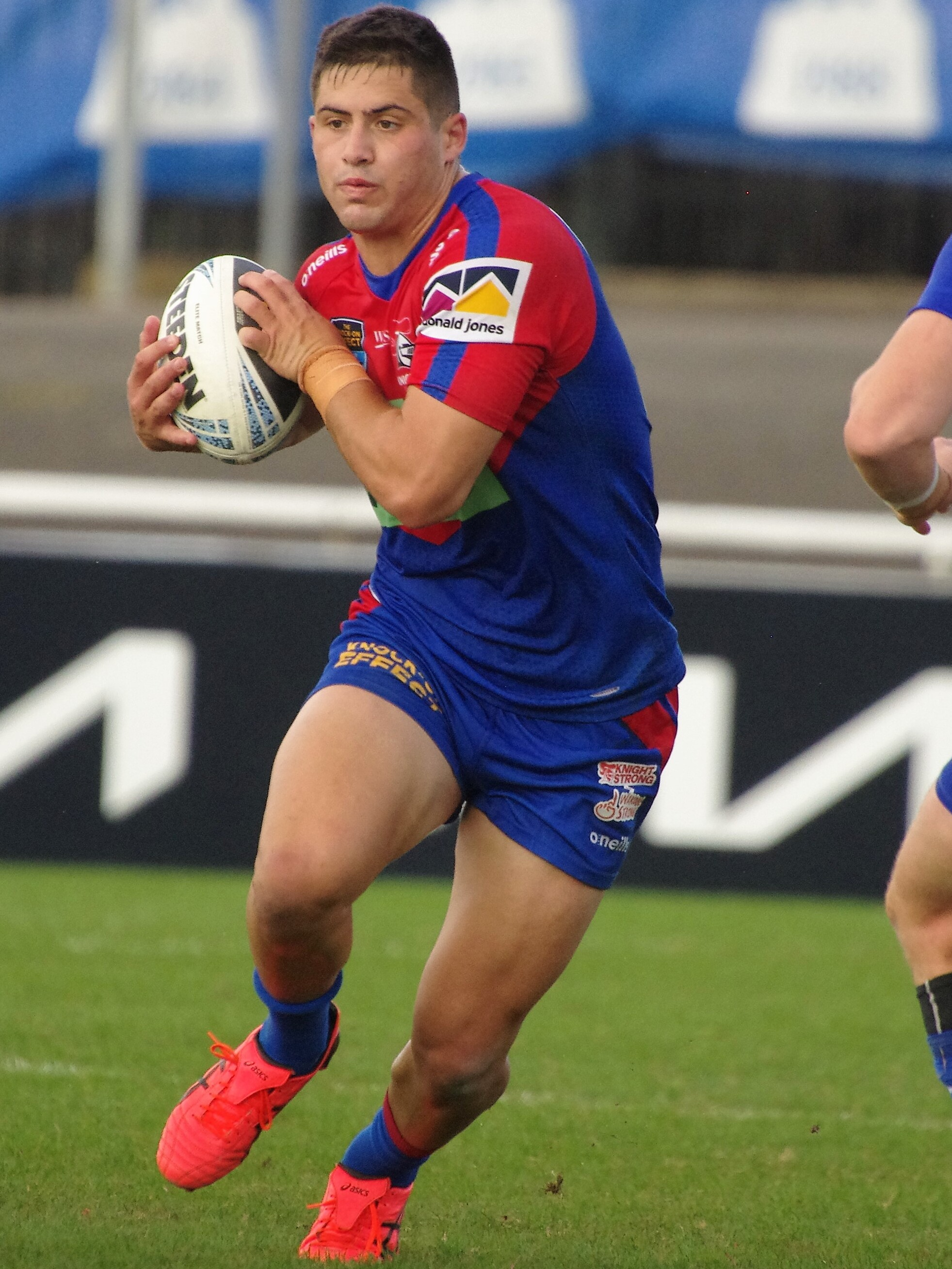

Personal information
- Full name: Benjamin Talty
- Born: 30 January 1999 (age 27) Scone, New South Wales, Australia
- Height: 183 cm (6 ft 0 in)
- Weight: 102 kg (16 st 1 lb)

Playing information
- Position: Prop
Club
Years	Team	Pld	T	G	FG	P
2025–	Brisbane Broncos	30	5	0	0	20
Representative
Years	Team	Pld	T	G	FG	P
2026	England	0	0	0	0	0
- As of 6 November 2026

Ben Talty (born 30 January 1999) is a professional rugby league footballer for the Brisbane Broncos in the National Rugby League .

== Background ==
Talty was born in Scone, New South Wales and played his junior rugby league for the Denman Devils. He attended St Joseph's High School, Aberdeen before being signed by the Newcastle Knights.

== Playing career ==
Talty spent his lower grade career with the Knights, playing for their Harold Matthews Cup side in 2016 and for their SG Ball Cup side in 2016 and 2017.

In 2018, he moved up to their Jersey Flegg Cup side, playing 30 games over two seasons. In 2019, he made his NSW Cup debut for the Knights, spending four years in their reserve grade side.

In 2023, Talty joined the North Sydney Bears halfway through the season.

=== 2025 ===
Due to their partnership with the Bears, Talty underwent pre-season training with the Melbourne Storm, playing and scoring in their NRL trial loss to the New Zealand Warriors.

In June, Talty joined the Brisbane Broncos on a one-and-a-half year train and trial deal.

In Round 18 of the 2025 NRL season, Talty made his first grade debut in Brisbane's 22–18 win over the Canterbury-Bankstown Bulldogs. A week later, he scored his first try in a win over the Gold Coast Titans.

On 17 September, the Brisbane outfit announced that Talty had re-signed with the club until the end of 2027. Talty played ten matches for Brisbane in the 2025 NRL season including the clubs qualifying and preliminary finals wins but was omitted from the grand final team. Brisbane would go on to win the 2025 NRL Grand Final defeating Melbourne 26-22.

=== 2026 ===
On 19 February, Talty played in Brisbane's World Club Challenge loss against Hull Kingston Rovers. Talty played 20 games for Brisbane in the 2026 NRL season as the club finished 14th on the table.
