= Ben Te Kura =

Australian rugby league footballer

Personal information
- Full name: Benjamin Te Kura
- Born: 10 April 2004 (age 22) Penrith, New South Wales, Australia
- Height: 205 cm (6 ft 9 in)
- Weight: 122 kg (19 st 3 lb)

Playing information
- Position: Prop
Club
Years	Team	Pld	T	G	FG	P
2024–26	Brisbane Broncos	5	1	0	0	4
- Source: As of 7 June 2025

Benjamin Te Kura (born 10 April 2004) is a professional rugby league footballer of Māori and Dutch descent. who last played as a prop for the Brisbane Broncos in the National Rugby League (NRL). He stands at 2.05 metres (6 ft 9 in), which makes him the tallest player to have played in the NRL.

== Playing career ==
=== Early career ===
Educated at Wavell State High School, Te Kura played junior rugby league with the Redcliffe Dolphins from the age of 6 to 17. After signing a development contract with the Brisbane Broncos, he moved across to the Norths Devils, playing in the Mal Meninga Cup.

He was selected to make his representative debut in 2022, playing for the Queensland U19s squad. However, he suffered a concussion after a head clash.

Te Kura graduated to the Queensland Cup during the 2022 season, making four appearances for the Devils. He switched to Souths Logan Magpies in 2023, again making the Queensland U19s representative squad. He scored seven tries in 20 appearances for the Magpies in the 2023 Queensland Cup. He also played for the NZA Kiwi Representative team in 2023.

=== 2024 ===
In round 5 of the 2024 NRL season, Te Kura made his NRL debut for Brisbane, coming off the bench against the Melbourne Storm. He scored a try in the 77th minute of the game. In round 9 of the Queensland Cup, while playing for Souths Logan Magpies, Te Kura suffered an injury to his foot.

=== 2026 ===
On 11 April 2026, the Brisbane Broncos granted Te Kura permission to take a 6 week leave from the club, in order to pursue a potential career in the National Football League (NFL). A projected offensive tackle, at the end of the six-week absence, Te Kura and the club will decide whether or not to extend his absence. On 2 July, the Broncos announced Te Kura had been released from his contract to pursue the NFL opportunity.

Te Kura travelled to Arizona to begin his football training. He tried out with the Seattle Seahawks and Chicago Bears, attending the latter workout alongside fellow rugby convert Kaylan Faumui.

== See also ==
- List of players who have converted from one football code to another
