= Josiah Karapani =

New Zealand professional rugby league footballer

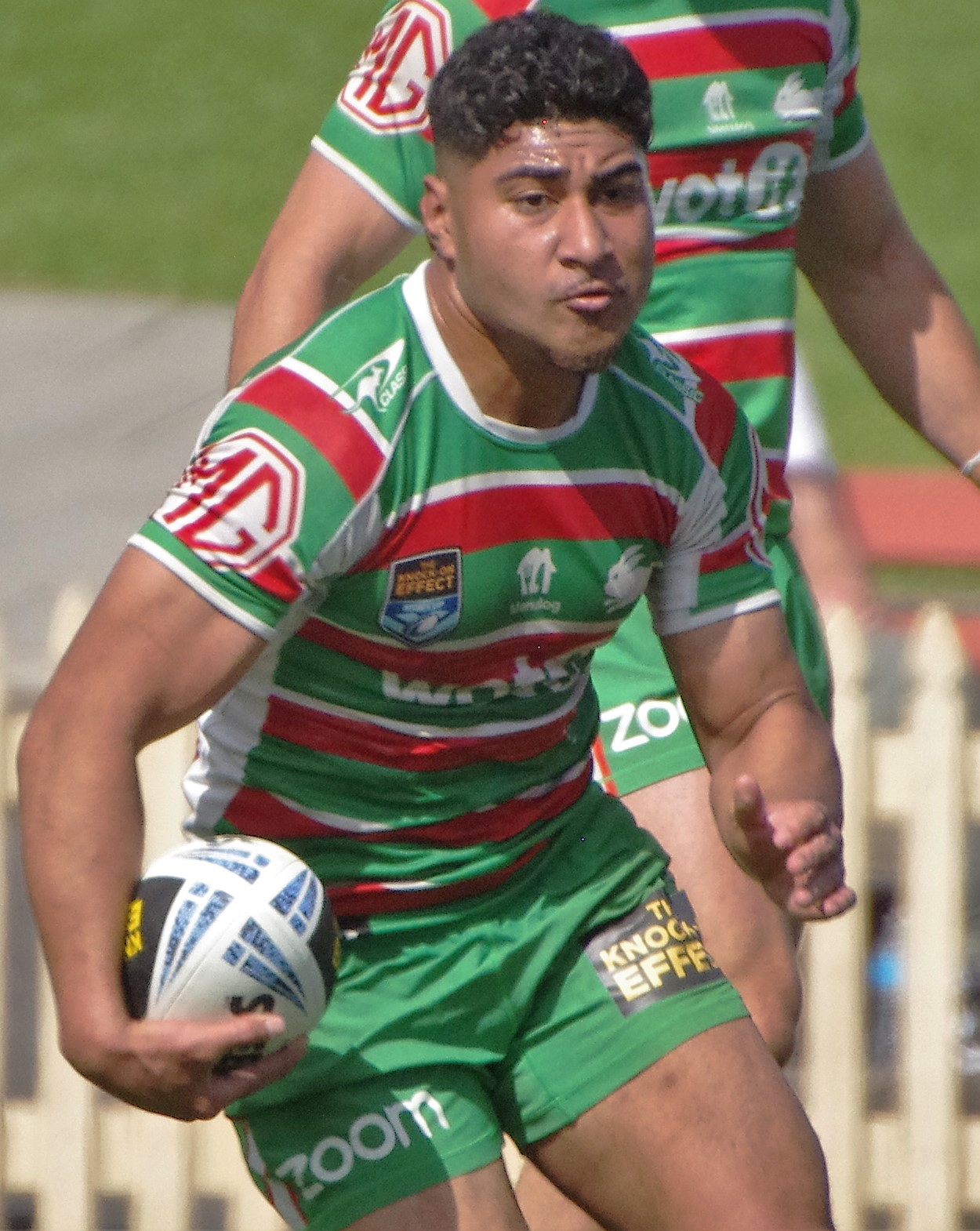

Personal information
- Full name: Josiah Karapani
- Born: 19 January 2002 (age 24) Auckland, New Zealand
- Height: 183 cm (6 ft 0 in)
- Weight: 90 kg (14 st 2 lb)

Playing information
- Position: Wing, Centre
Club
Years	Team	Pld	T	G	FG	P
2024–	Brisbane Broncos	44	19	0	0	76
- Source: As of 3 September 2026

Josiah Karapani (born 19 January 2002) is a New Zealand professional rugby league footballer who plays as a winger for the Brisbane Broncos in the National Rugby League, with whom he won the 2025 NRL Grand Final.

== Background ==
Born in Auckland, Karapani is of Samoan descent. He played junior rugby league for the Otahuhu Leopards and junior rugby union for East Tamaki. He attended Pakūranga College before being signed by the New Zealand Warriors.

== Playing career ==
=== Early career ===
In 2020, Karapani played for the Warriors in the SG Ball Cup. In 2021, he signed with the South Sydney Rabbitohs, playing for their SG Ball, Jersey Flegg Cup and New South Wales Cup sides over the following three seasons.

=== 2024 ===
Karapani moved to the Brisbane Broncos for the 2024 season, originally on a train-and-trial deal before earning a fulltime contract in March. He began the season playing for the Burleigh Bears in the Queensland Cup.

In Round 11 of the 2024 NRL season, Karapani made his first grade debut in Brisbane's 13–12 win over the Manly Warringah Sea Eagles. He played 9 games in his rookie season for the Brisbane outfit.

=== 2025 ===
In round 14 of the 2025 NRL season, Karapani scored two tries for Brisbane in their 44-14 win over strugglers the Gold Coast. In round 16, Karapani scored two tries for Brisbane in their come from behind victory against Cronulla. Karapani played 13 matches for Brisbane in the 2025 NRL season including the club’s 2025 NRL Grand Final victory over Melbourne.

=== 2026 ===
On 19 February, Karapani played in Brisbane's World Club Challenge loss against Hull Kingston Rovers. On 1 April, Karapani was stood down by Brisbane for one match after he was charged by Queensland police for being a public nuisance. Karapani was fined $1000 over the incident. He played 23 matches for Brisbane in the 2026 NRL season as the club finished 14th on the table.

== Statistics ==
Year	Team	Games	Tries	Pts
2024	Brisbane Broncos	9		
2025	Brisbane Broncos	13	11	44
2026	Brisbane Broncos	22	8	32
	Totals	44	19	76
