= Israel Leota =

Australian rugby league footballer

Personal information
- Born: 2 January 2005 (age 21) Wellington, New Zealand
- Height: 190 cm (6 ft 3 in)
- Weight: 101 kg (223 lb; 15 st 13 lb)

Playing information
- Position: Wing
Club
Years	Team	Pld	T	G	FG	P
2022–2023	Souths Logan Magpies
2025	Brisbane Broncos
	Total	0	0	0	0	0
- Source: As of 15 May 2025

Rugby union career
Senior career
Years	Team	Apps	(Points)
2025	Moana Pasifika		
2026	North Harbour	2	(20)

Israel Leota (born 2 January 2005) is a New Zealand-born Australian professional rugby union footballer who played for Moana Pasifika in the Super Rugby.

He previously played rugby league as a winger for the Souths Logan Magpies in the Queensland Cup.

== Background ==
Born in Wellington, New Zealand, Leota moved to Queensland, Australia, during his youth. He played junior rugby league for Logan Brothers between the ages of 8 and 12 before exploring rugby union and Australian rules football. He returned to rugby league at 16, joining Souths Acacia Ridge.

== Playing career ==
=== Early career ===
Israel Leota joined the Souths Logan Magpies in 2022, initially playing in the Auswide Bank Mal Meninga Cup. He made his senior debut for the Magpies in the Hostplus Cup on 20 May 2023, during Round 10 against the Northern Pride. He also scored a try for the Brisbane Broncos during a trial game against Wynnum Manly Seagulls. He was later named in the Queensland Maroons Under 19 squad.

Continuing with the Magpies, Leota played 8 games during the 2024 Hostplus Cup season and scored 6 tries. He was again selected for the Queensland Under 19 team in June.

=== 2025 ===
Leota was promoted to the Brisbane Broncos' Top 30 roster, officially signing him for the 2025 NRL season. He was later was announced to be part of the Broncos' team trial game against the Burleigh Bears in February 2025. In July, Leota announced that he would depart the NRL for the Super Rugby Moana Pasifika at the end of the 2025 season.
