= Blake Mozer =

Australian rugby league player (born 2004)

Personal information
- Full name: Blake Mozer
- Born: 2 May 2004 (age 22) Southport, Queensland, Australia
- Height: 183 cm (6 ft 0 in)
- Weight: 85 kg (13 st 5 lb)

Playing information
- Position: Hooker
Club
Years	Team	Pld	T	G	FG	P
2023–	Brisbane Broncos	16	1	0	0	4

Blake Mozer (born 2 May 2004) is a Greek Australian professional Rugby league footballer who plays as a Hooker for the Brisbane Broncos in the NRL.

== Background ==
Mozer went to Keebra Park State High School. His family is of Greek descent.

== Playing career ==
=== Early career ===
On 11 June 2022, Mozer made his Hostplus Cup debut for the Souths Logan Magpies against the Papua New Guinea Hunters.

On 23 June 2022, Mozer made his U19's State of Origin debut for Queensland against NSW. New South Wales went on to win 32 - 4.

=== Playing career ===
On 31 August 2023, Mozer made his NRL debut for the Brisbane Broncos on the Interchange against the Melbourne Storm. Brisbane lost 32 - 22. Mozer played eight games for Brisbane in the 2024 NRL season which saw the club miss the finals finishing 12th on the table. Mozer is currently signed with Brisbane until the end of the 2027 NRL Season.

=== 2025 ===
On 19 June, Brisbane announced that Mozer had re-signed with the club for a further two years. Mozer made no appearances for Brisbane in the 2025 NRL season due to a shoulder injury as the club claimed their 7th premiership defeating Melbourne in the 2025 NRL Grand Final.

=== 2026 ===
In round 6 of the 2026 NRL, Mozer played his first game of the season. During the game he suffered a broken jaw and was Sidelined for an estimated 6 weeks
