= Xavier Willison =

Cook Islands & NZ international rugby league footballer

Personal information
- Full name: Xavier Willison
- Born: 2 August 2002 (age 24) Hamilton, Waikato, New Zealand
- Height: 205 cm (6 ft 9 in)
- Weight: 123 kg (19 st 5 lb)

Playing information
- Position: Prop, Second-row, Lock
Club
Years	Team	Pld	T	G	FG	P
2021–	Brisbane Broncos	75	17	0	0	68
Representative
Years	Team	Pld	T	G	FG	P
2022	Cook Islands	1	0	0	0	0
2024–25	Māori All Stars	2	1	0	0	4
2025–26	New Zealand	7	2	0	0	8
- Source: As of 20 November 2026
- Relatives: Tenika Willison (cousin); Jackson Willison (cousin)

Xavier Willison (born 2 August 2002) is a professional rugby league footballer who plays as a second-row or prop forward for the Brisbane Broncos in the National Rugby League, with whom he won the 2025 NRL Grand Final. He has played for the Cook Islands and for New Zealand at international level.

== Playing career ==
=== 2021 ===
In round 20 of the 2021 NRL season, Willison made his debut for the Brisbane club against fierce rivals the North Queensland Cowboys.

On 17 August, it was announced that Willison would be ruled out indefinitely with an ACL injury.

=== 2022 ===
Willison made his test debut for the Cook Islands in the 2022 Pacific Rugby League Tests against Samoa. Willison due to injury, only played one NRL game against St George Illawarra Dragons in Round 17 in a 32-18 win.

=== 2023 ===
Willison in round 20 scored his first NRL try for the year against the Canterbury-Bankstown Bulldogs in a 44-24 win. In round 21, Willison scored his second NRL try for the year in a 36-20 win over the South Sydney Rabbitohs. He played a total of seven games for Brisbane in the 2023 NRL season but did not feature in the clubs finals campaign nor the 2023 NRL Grand Final loss against Penrith.

=== 2024 ===
Willison played 19 games for Brisbane in the 2024 NRL season which saw the club miss the finals finishing 12th on the table. On 1 November, the Broncos announced that Willison had re-signed with the club until the end of 2027.

=== 2025 ===
In round 5 of the 2025 NRL season, Willison scored two tries for Brisbane in their 46-24 victory over the Wests Tigers. Willison played 21 games for Brisbane in the 2025 NRL season including the clubs 2025 NRL Grand Final victory over Melbourne.

=== 2026 ===
On 19 February, Willison played in Brisbane's World Club Challenge loss against Hull Kingston Rovers. Willison played all 24 games for Brisbane in the 2026 NRL season as the club finished 14th on the table.

== Statistics ==
Year	Team	Games	Tries	Pts
2021	Brisbane Broncos	3	1	4
2022	Brisbane Broncos	1		
2023	Brisbane Broncos	7	2	8
2024	Brisbane Broncos	19	3	12
2025	Brisbane Broncos	21	4	16
2026	Brisbane Broncos	24	7	28
2027	Brisbane Broncos			
	Totals	75	17	68

*denotes season competing
