= List of players with 100 NRL tries =

Overall, there have been 90 players who have scored 100 or more tries in the National Rugby League and its predecessors (the NSWRL, ARL and Super League). Active players are listed in bold.

| Ranking | Tries | No. | Reached In | Player | Club/Clubs | Career span |
|---|---|---|---|---|---|---|
| 1 | 240 | 72 | 2020 | **Alex Johnston** | South Sydney Rabbitohs | 2014– |
| 2 | 212 | 10 | 1965 | Ken Irvine | North Sydney, Manly Warringah Sea Eagles | 1958–1973 |
| 3 | 198 | 71 | 2020 | Daniel Tupou | Sydney Roosters | 2012–2026 |
| 4 | 190 | 48 | 2009 | Billy Slater | Melbourne Storm | 2003–2018 |
| 5 | 180 | 26 | 1999 | Steve Menzies | Manly Warringah Sea Eagles, Northern Eagles | 1993–2008 |
| 6 | 176 | 59 | 2014 | Brett Morris | St. George Illawarra Dragons, Canterbury-Bankstown Bulldogs, Sydney Roosters | 2006–2021 |
| 7 | 167 | 74 | 2021 | **Josh Addo-Carr** | Wests Tigers, Melbourne Storm, Canterbury-Bankstown Bulldogs, **Parramatta Eels** | 2016– |
| 8 | 166 | 22 | 1994 | Andrew Ettingshausen | Cronulla-Sutherland Sharks | 1983–2000 |
| 9 | 164 | 17 | 1988 | Terry Lamb | Western Suburbs Magpies, Canterbury Bulldogs | 1980–1996 |
| 10 | 163 | 53 | 2011 | Brett Stewart | Manly Warringah Sea Eagles | 2003–2016 |
| 11 | 161 | 76 | 2022 | **James Tedesco** | Wests Tigers, **Sydney Roosters** | 2012– |
| =12 | 159 | 36 | 2003 | Matt Sing | Penrith Panthers, Sydney City Roosters, North Queensland Cowboys | 1993–2006 |
| =12 | 159 | 38 | 2004 | Hazem El Masri | Canterbury-Bankstown Bulldogs | 1996–2009 |
| 14 | 158 | 66 | 2016 | Josh Morris | St. George Illawarra Dragons, Canterbury-Bankstown Bulldogs, Cronulla-Sutherland Sharks, Sydney Roosters | 2007–2021 |
| 15 | 157 | 61 | 2015 | Michael Jennings | Penrith Panthers, Sydney Roosters, Parramatta Eels | 2007–2020, 2024 |
| 16 | 154 | 50 | 2010 | Nathan Merritt | South Sydney Rabbitohs, Cronulla-Sutherland Sharks | 2002–2014 |
| =17 | 152 | 2 | 1920 | Harold Horder | South Sydney, North Sydney | 1912–1924 |
| =17 | 152 | 55 | 2012 | Manu Vatuvei | New Zealand Warriors | 2004–2017 |
| 19 | 151 | 73 | 2021 | Kyle Feldt | North Queensland Cowboys | 2013–2024 |
| 20 | 149 | 56 | 2013 | Greg Inglis | Melbourne Storm, South Sydney Rabbitohs | 2005–2019 |
| 21 | 147 | 12 | 1975 | Bob Fulton | Manly-Warringah Sea Eagles, Eastern Suburbs Roosters | 1966–1979 |
| 22 | 146 | 1 | 1919 | Frank Burge | Glebe, St. George | 1911–1927 |
| 23 | 144 | 3 | 1929 | Benny Wearing | South Sydney | 1921–1933 |
| 24 | 143 | 11 | 1967 | Johnny King | St. George | 1960–1971 |
| 25 | 142 | 24 | 1996 | Steve Renouf | Brisbane Broncos | 1989–1999 |
| 26 | 140 | 37 | 2004 | Nigel Vagana | Auckland Warriors, Canterbury-Bankstown Bulldogs, Cronulla-Sutherland Sharks, South Sydney Rabbitohs | 1996–2008 |
| =27 | 139 | 51 | 2010 | Anthony Minichiello | Sydney Roosters | 2000–2014 |
| =27 | 139 | 63 | 2015 | Shaun Kenny-Dowall | Sydney Roosters, Newcastle Knights | 2007–2019 |
| 29 | 138 | 18 | 1990 | Phil Blake | Manly Warringah Sea Eagles, South Sydney Rabbitohs, North Sydney Bears, Canberra Raiders, St. George Dragons, Auckland Warriors | 1982–1997 |
| 30 | 137 | 8 | 1963 | Eddie Lumsden | Manly-Warringah, St. George | 1955–1966 |
| 31 | 136 | 67 | 2017 | Jarrod Croker | Canberra Raiders | 2009–2023 |
| 32 | 130 | 45 | 2009 | Matt Bowen | North Queensland Cowboys | 2001–2013 |
| =33 | 129 | 41 | 2006 | Rhys Wesser | Penrith Panthers, South Sydney Rabbitohs | 1998–2011 |
| =33 | 129 | 62 | 2015 | Akuila Uate | Newcastle Knights, Manly Warringah Sea Eagles | 2008–2018 |
| =35 | 128 | 4 | 1944 | Sid Goodwin | Balmain, Newtown | 1933–1945 |
| =35 | 128 | 83 | 2024 | **Dallin Watene-Zelezniak** | Penrith Panthers, Canterbury-Bankstown Bulldogs, **New Zealand Warriors** | 2014– |
| =37 | 127 | 9 | 1964 | Reg Gasnier | St. George | 1959–1967 |
| =37 | 127 | 31 | 2001 | Wendell Sailor | Brisbane Broncos, St. George Illawarra Dragons | 1993–2001, 2008–2009 |
| 39 | 126 | 69 | 2018 | Blake Ferguson | Cronulla-Sutherland Sharks, Canberra Raiders, Sydney Roosters, Parramatta Eels | 2009–2013, 2015–2021 |
| =40 | 124 | 47 | 2009 | Luke Burt | Parramatta Eels | 1999–2012 |
| =40 | 124 | 52 | 2010 | Matt Cooper | St. George Illawarra Dragons | 2000–2013 |
| =40 | 124 | 80 | 2024 | **Valentine Holmes** | Cronulla-Sutherland Sharks, North Queensland Cowboys, **St. George Illawarra Dragons** | 2014–2018, 2020– |
| =43 | 122 | 16 | 1986 | Steve Morris | St. George Dragons, Eastern Suburbs Roosters | 1979–1990 |
| =43 | 122 | 27 | 2000 | Brett Mullins | Canberra Raiders, Sydney Roosters | 1990–2000, 2002 |
| =43 | 122 | 34 | 2002 | Brad Fittler | Penrith Panthers, Sydney Roosters | 1989–2004 |
| =43 | 122 | 40 | 2006 | Darren Lockyer | Brisbane Broncos | 1995–2011 |
| =43 | 122 | 58 | 2013 | Jamie Lyon | Parramatta Eels, Manly Warringah Sea Eagles | 2000–2004, 2007–2016 |
| =43 | 122 | 64 | 2015 | Luke Lewis | Penrith Panthers, Cronulla-Sutherland Sharks | 2001–2018 |
| =49 | 121 | 32 | 2002 | Nathan Blacklock | Sydney City Roosters, St. George Dragons, St. George Illawarra Dragons | 1995–2004 |
| =49 | 121 | 43 | 2007 | Timana Tahu | Newcastle Knights, Parramatta Eels, Penrith Panthers | 1999–2007, 2010–2014 |
| =49 | 121 | 60 | 2014 | Jarryd Hayne | Parramatta Eels, Gold Coast Titans | 2006–2014, 2016–2018 |
| =49 | 121 | 75 | 2022 | Corey Oates | Brisbane Broncos | 2013–2024 |
| =53 | 120 | 25 | 1997 | Michael Hancock | Brisbane Broncos | 1988–2000 |
| =53 | 120 | 30 | 2001 | Jason Croker | Canberra Raiders | 1991–2006 |
| =55 | 119 | 7 | 1958 | Ian Moir | South Sydney, Western Suburbs | 1952–1960 |
| =55 | 119 | 13 | 1975 | Bob McCarthy | South Sydney, Canterbury-Bankstown Bulldogs | 1963–1978 |
| =55 | 119 | 79 | 2024 | **Latrell Mitchell** | Sydney Roosters, **South Sydney Rabbitohs** | 2016– |
| =55 | 119 | 81 | 2024 | **Tom Trbojevic** | Manly Warringah Sea Eagles | 2015– |
| 59 | 117 | 39 | 2005 | David Peachey | Cronulla-Sutherland Sharks, South Sydney Rabbitohs | 1994–2007 |
| 60 | 116 | 21 | 1993 | Ricky Walford | Eastern Suburbs Roosters, North Sydney Bears, St. George Dragons | 1982–1996 |
| =61 | 115 | 6 | 1956 | Ray Preston | Newtown, Parramatta | 1949–1959 |
| =61 | 115 | 29 | 2000 | Darren Smith | Canterbury-Bankstown Bulldogs, Brisbane Broncos | 1990–2002, 2004–2005 |
| =63 | 113 | 42 | 2007 | Matt Geyer | Perth Reds, Melbourne Storm | 1997–2008 |
| =63 | 113 | 86 | 2025 | **Ronaldo Mulitalo** | Cronulla-Sutherland Sharks | 2019– |
| 65 | 112 | 15 | 1980 | Tom Mooney | South Sydney, Manly Warringah Sea Eagles | 1972–1981 |
| =66 | 111 | 23 | 1995 | Greg Alexander | Penrith Panthers, Auckland Warriors | 1984–1999 |
| =66 | 111 | 78 | 2023 | Jordan Rapana | Gold Coast Titans, Canberra Raiders | 2008, 2014–2024 |
| =68 | 110 | 5 | 1947 | Jack Lindwall | St. George | 1938–1949 |
| =68 | 110 | 20 | 1991 | Brett Kenny | Parramatta Eels | 1980–1993 |
| =68 | 110 | 68 | 2017 | Jason Nightingale | St. George Illawarra Dragons | 2007–2018 |
| =68 | 110 | 84 | 2024 | **Clint Gutherson** | Manly Warringah Sea Eagles, Parramatta Eels, **St. George Illawarra Dragons** | 2013– |
| =72 | 109 | 33 | 2002 | Ryan Girdler | Illawarra Steelers, Penrith Panthers | 1991–2004 |
| =72 | 109 | 54 | 2011 | Colin Best | Cronulla-Sutherland Sharks, St. George Illawarra Dragons, Canberra Raiders, South Sydney Rabbitohs | 1998–2002, 2005–2012 |
| =72 | 109 | 85 | 2025 | **Cody Walker** | South Sydney Rabbitohs | 2016– |
| 75 | 107 | 46 | 2009 | Mat Rogers | Cronulla-Sutherland Sharks, Gold Coast Titans | 1995–2001, 2007–2011 |
| =76 | 106 | 19 | 1990 | John Ferguson | Newtown Jets, Eastern Suburbs Roosters, Canberra Raiders | 1980–1990 |
| =76 | 106 | 44 | 2008 | Amos Roberts | St. George Illawarra Dragons, Penrith Panthers, Sydney Roosters | 2000–2008 |
| 78 | 105 | 87 | 2026 | Daly Cherry-Evans | Manly Warringah Sea Eagles, Sydney Roosters | 2011–2026 |
| =79 | 104 | 14 | 1977 | Bill Mullins | Eastern Suburbs Roosters | 1968–1978 |
| =79 | 104 | 77 | 2023 | David Nofoaluma | Wests Tigers, Melbourne Storm | 2013–2023 |
| =79 | 104 | 82 | 2024 | Maika Sivo | Parramatta Eels | 2019–2024 |
| =79 | 104 | 88 | 2026 | **Brian To'o** | Penrith Panthers | 2019– |
| 83 | 103 | 65 | 2015 | David Simmons | Cronulla-Sutherland Sharks, Penrith Panthers | 2003–2015 |
| =84 | 102 | 57 | 2013 | Ashley Graham | Parramatta Eels, North Queensland Cowboys | 2002–2013 |
| =84 | 102 | 90 | 2026 | **Sione Katoa** | Cronulla-Sutherland Sharks, **North Queensland Cowboys** | 2018– |
| 86 | 101 | 70 | 2019 | Cooper Cronk | Melbourne Storm, Sydney Roosters | 2004–2019 |
| =87 | 100 | 28 | 2000 | Tim Brasher | Balmain Tigers, South Sydney Rabbitohs, North Queensland Cowboys | 1989–2002 |
| =87 | 100 | 35 | 2002 | Allan Langer | Brisbane Broncos | 1988–1999, 2002 |
| =87 | 100 | 49 | 2010 | Luke Patten | Illawarra Steelers, St. George Illawarra Dragons, Canterbury-Bankstown Bulldogs | 1998–2010 |
| =87 | 100 | 89 | 2026 | **Reuben Garrick** | Manly Warringah Sea Eagles, **Sydney Roosters** | 2019– |
Source: Rugby League Tables / Try Scorers. Last updated: As of the conclusion of the 2026 season.

== See also ==
- List of National Rugby League players with five tries in a game
- List of players with 1,000 NRL points
- List of players with 20 NRL field goals
- List of players with 100 NRL tries and 500 NRL goals
- List of players with 500 NRL goals
- List of players who have played 300 NRL games
