= List of National Rugby League players with five tries in a game =

As of 9 May 2026, there have been 45 players who have scored 5 or more tries in a game in the National Rugby League and its predecessors, the NSWRL, ARL and Super League premierships. Five players have managed the feat more than once, two of whom did so in a single season, with Dave Brown the only one to accomplish it on three occasions. Frank Burge holds the records of first player to score five or more tries, being the only forward to do so, and most tries scored in a game. Players still currently active are listed in bold.

| # | Player | Tries | Position | Club | Opponent | Ground | Round | Season | Notes |
|---|---|---|---|---|---|---|---|---|---|
| 1 | Frank Burge | 6 | Second-row | Glebe | North Sydney | Wentworth | 11 | 1916 | |
| 2 | Harold Horder | 5 | Wing | South Sydney | North Sydney | Royal Agricultural Society Ground | 5 | 1917 | |
| 3 | Harold Horder | 5 | Wing | South Sydney | North Sydney | Royal Agricultural Society Ground | 12 | 1917 | |
| 4 | Frank Burge | 8 | Lock | Glebe | University | Royal Agricultural Society Ground | 7 | 1920 | Record for most tries scored by a player in a single game |
| 5 | Gordon Wright | 5 | Wing | Eastern Suburbs | Balmain | Royal Agricultural Society Ground | 10 | 1920 | |
| 6 | Cec Blinkhorn | 5 | Wing | North Sydney | Annandale | North Sydney Oval | 14 | 1920 | |
| 7 | Sid Goodwin | 5 | Wing | Balmain | University | Leichhardt Oval | 2 | 1935 | |
| 8 | Rod O'Loan | 7 | Wing | Eastern Suburbs | University | Sydney Sports Ground | 5 | 1935 | |
| 9 | Dave Brown | 5 | Centre | Eastern Suburbs | Canterbury | Sydney Sports Ground | 6 | 1935 | |
| 10 | Dave Brown | 6 | Centre | Eastern Suburbs | Canterbury | Pratten Park | 15 | 1935 | |
| 11 | Dave Brown | 6 | Centre | Eastern Suburbs | Balmain | Sydney Cricket Ground | 18 | 1935 | |
| 12 | Alan Ridley | 6 | Wing | Western Suburbs | Newtown | Pratten Park | 9 | 1936 | Two players achieved feat in separate matches that began at the same time on 11 July 1936. |
| 12 | Alan Quinlivan | 5 | Centre | South Sydney | University | Earl Park | 9 | 1936 | Two players achieved feat in separate matches that began at the same time on 11 July 1936. |
| 14 | Don Manson | 5 | Wing | South Sydney | University | Sydney Sports Ground | 1 | 1937 | Only instance in an opening round of season, and was player's NSWRFL debut. |
| 15 | Edgar Newham | 5 | Wing | Canterbury | Balmain | Sydney Cricket Ground | Play-Off | 1942 | First of only two instances outside the home-and-away season, in play-off for minor premiership. |
| 16 | Johnny Bliss | 5 | Wing | North Sydney | Eastern Suburbs | North Sydney Oval | 9 | 1944 | |
| 17 | Arthur Patton | 5 | Wing | Balmain | Eastern Suburbs | Sydney Cricket Ground | 14 | 1944 | |
| 18 | Jack Lindwall | 6 | Wing | St. George | Manly | Hurstville Oval | 4 | 1947 | |
| 19 | Bobby Lulham | 5 | Wing | Balmain | Parramatta | Leichhardt Oval | 15 | 1947 | |
| 20 | Norm Jacobson | 5 | Wing | Newtown | Parramatta | Erskineville Oval | 2 | 1948 | |
| 21 | Johnny Graves | 5 | Wing | South Sydney | Eastern Suburbs | Redfern Oval | 14 | 1949 | |
| 22 | Jack Troy | 6 | Wing | Newtown | Eastern Suburbs | Sydney Sports Ground | 13 | 1950 | |
| 23 | Merv Lees | 5 | Centre | St. George | North Sydney | Sydney Cricket Ground | 14 | 1954 | |
| 24 | Brian Allsop | 5 | Wing | Eastern Suburbs | Parramatta | Sydney Sports Ground | 10 | 1955 | |
| 25 | Ian Moir | 5 | Wing | South Sydney | Parramatta | Redfern Oval | 7 | 1957 | |
| 26 | Eric Sladden | 5 | Wing | South Sydney | Parramatta | Cumberland Oval | 16 | 1957 | |
| 27 | Les Hanigan | 5 | Wing | Manly | Cronulla | Brookvale Oval | 8 | 1967 | |
| 28 | Peter Langmack | 5 | Lock | Penrith | St. George | Penrith Park | 15 | 1974 | |
| 29 | David Topliss | 5 | Five-eighth | Balmain | Newtown | Henson Park | 20 | 1977 | |
| 30 | Andrew Ettingshausen | 5 | Centre | Cronulla | Illawarra | Endeavour Field | 22 | 1989 | |
| 31 | Mal Meninga | 5 | Centre | Canberra | Eastern Suburbs | Bruce Stadium | 5 | 1990 | |
| 32 | Alan McIndoe | 5 | Wing | Illawarra | Gold Coast | Wollongong Showground | 8 | 1991 | |
| 33 | Andrew Ettingshausen | 5 | Centre | Cronulla | South Sydney | Endeavour Field | 22 | 1994 | |
| 34 | Nigel Vagana | 5 | Centre | Bulldogs | South Sydney | Sydney Football Stadium | 4 | 2002 | |
| 35 | Jamie Lyon | 5 | Centre | Parramatta | Cronulla | Parramatta Stadium | 24 | 2003 | |
| 36 | Francis Meli | 5 | Wing | New Zealand | Bulldogs | Sydney Showground Stadium | QF | 2003 | First instance in a "mandatory" final, and only the second outside the home-and-away rounds. |
| 37 | Nathan Merritt | 5 | Fullback | South Sydney | Parramatta | Stadium Australia | 22 | 2011 | |
| 40 | **Alex Johnston** | 5 | Wing | South Sydney | Penrith | Stadium Australia | 17 | 2017 | |
| 41 | Matt Ikuvalu | 5 | Wing | Sydney | North Queensland | North Queensland Stadium | 9 | 2020 | |
| 42 | **Alex Johnston** | 5 | Wing | South Sydney | Sydney | Stadium Australia | 20 | 2020 | |
| 43 | **Josh Addo-Carr** | 6 | Wing | Melbourne | South Sydney | Stadium Australia | 9 | 2021 | |
| 44 | Edrick Lee | 5 | Wing | Newcastle | Gold Coast | Newcastle International Sports Centre | 16 | 2022 | |
| 45 | **Greg Marzhew** | 5 | Wing | Newcastle | St. George Illawarra | WIN Stadium | 10 | 2026 | |

== See also ==
- List of players with 1,000 NRL points
- List of players with 20 NRL field goals
- List of players with 100 NRL tries and 500 NRL goals
- List of players with 500 NRL goals
- List of players who have played 300 NRL games
