= List of players with 500 NRL goals =

There have been 40 players who have kicked 500 or more goals in the National Rugby League and its predecessors, the NSWRL, ARL and Super League premierships. Players still currently active are listed in bold.

Ranking	Goals	No.	Reached in	Player	Club(s)	Career span
1	1,295	27	2011	Cameron Smith	Melbourne Storm	2002–2020
2	1,169	35	2018	Adam Reynolds	South Sydney Rabbitohs, Brisbane Broncos	2012–2026
3	942	15	1996	Jason Taylor	Western Suburbs Magpies, North Sydney Bears, Northern Eagles, Parramatta Eels	1990–2001
4	923	28	2013	Johnathan Thurston	Canterbury-Bankstown Bulldogs, North Queensland Cowboys	2002–2018
5	917	19	2001	Andrew Johns	Newcastle Knights	1993–2007
6	915	34	2016	Jarrod Croker	Canberra Raiders	2009–2023
7	891	23	2005	Hazem El Masri	Canterbury-Bankstown Bulldogs	1996–2009
8	865	8	1982	Mick Cronin	Parramatta Eels	1977–1986
9	855	16	1997	Daryl Halligan	North Sydney Bears, Canterbury-Bankstown Bulldogs	1991–2000
10	847	7	1978	Graham Eadie	Manly Warringah Sea Eagles	1971–1983
11	813	36	2023	**Nathan Cleary**	Penrith Panthers	2016–
12	803	4	1971	Eric Simms	South Sydney Rabbitohs	1965–1975
13	772	30	2015	James Maloney	Melbourne Storm, New Zealand Warriors, Sydney Roosters, Cronulla-Sutherland Sharks, Penrith Panthers	2009–2019
14	742	3	1963	Keith Barnes	Balmain	1955–1968
15	718	24	2006	Craig Fitzgibbon	Illawarra Steelers, St. George Illawarra Dragons, Sydney Roosters	1998–2009
16	681	32	2016	Michael Gordon	Penrith Panthers, Cronulla-Sutherland Sharks, Parramatta Eels, Sydney Roosters, Gold Coast Titans	2006–2019
17	652	22	2004	Clinton Schifcofske	South Queensland Crushers, Parramatta Eels, Canberra Raiders	1996–2006
18	648	6	1973	Graeme Langlands	St. George	1963–1976
19	646	26	2010	Luke Burt	Parramatta Eels	1999–2012
20	624	20	2002	Ryan Girdler	Illawarra Steelers, Penrith Panthers	1991–2004
21	617	39	2025	**Jamayne Isaako**	Brisbane Broncos, Gold Coast Titans, Dolphins, **Melbourne Storm**	2017–
22	608	37	2023	**Mitchell Moses**	Wests Tigers, **Parramatta Eels**	2014–
23	603	2	1961	Ron Willey	Canterbury-Bankstown, Manly-Warringah, Parramatta	1948–1964
=24	598	11	1984	Steve Gearin	Canterbury-Bankstown Bulldogs, St. George Dragons, Manly Warringah Sea Eagles	1975–1986
=24	598	25	2008	Matt Orford	Northern Eagles, Melbourne Storm, Manly Warringah Sea Eagles, Canberra Raiders	2000–2009, 2011
26	586	29	2015	Corey Parker	Brisbane Broncos	2001–2016
27	580	17	1998	Matthew Ridge	Manly Warringah Sea Eagles, Auckland Warriors	1990–1999
28	564	9	1982	Ken Wilson	Newtown Jets, Penrith Panthers	1971–1983
29	559	38	2023	Shaun Johnson	New Zealand Warriors, Cronulla-Sutherland Sharks	2011–2024
=30	553	13	1988	John Dorahy	Western Suburbs Magpies, Manly Warringah Sea Eagles, Illawarra Steelers, North Sydney Bears	1974–1985, 1987–1989
=30	553	21	2002	Ivan Cleary	Manly Warringah Sea Eagles, North Sydney Bears, Sydney City Roosters, New Zealand Warriors	1992–2002
32	543	10	1982	Steve Rogers	Cronulla-Sutherland Sharks, St. George Dragons	1973–1985
33	533	33	2016	Jamie Lyon	Parramatta Eels, Manly Warringah Sea Eagles	2000–2004, 2007–2016
34	527	12	1985	Ron Giteau	Western Suburbs Magpies, Eastern Suburbs Roosters, Canberra Raiders	1974–1986
35	524	14	1988	Ross Conlon	Western Suburbs Magpies, Canterbury-Bankstown Bulldogs, Balmain Tigers	1981–1988
36	521	31	2016	Jamie Soward	Sydney Roosters, St. George Illawarra Dragons, Penrith Panthers	2005–2016
37	519	1	1960	Bernie Purcell	Western Suburbs, South Sydney	1948–1960
38	517	40	2026	**Reuben Garrick**	Manly Warringah Sea Eagles, **Sydney Roosters**	2019–
39	511	18	2000	David Furner	Canberra Raiders	1992–2000
40	501	5	1971	Bob Batty	Manly-Warringah	1959–1971

== See also ==
- List of National Rugby League players with five tries in a game
- List of players who have played 300 NRL games
- List of players with 1,000 NRL points
- List of players with 20 NRL field goals
- List of players with 100 NRL tries
- List of players with 100 NRL tries and 500 NRL goals
