= List of players with 100 NRL tries and 500 NRL goals =

There have been 6 players who have scored 100 or more tries and kicked 500 or more goals in the National Rugby League and its predecessors, the NSWRL, ARL and Super League premierships. Players still currently active are listed in bold.

No.	Reached in	Tries	Goals	Player	Club/clubs	Career span	Points
1	2002	109	624	Ryan Girdler	Illawarra Steelers, Penrith Panthers	1991–2004	1,690
2	2005	159	891	Hazem El Masri	Canterbury-Bankstown Bulldogs	1996–2009	2,418
3	2010	124	646	Luke Burt	Parramatta Eels	1999–2012	1,793
4	2016	122	533	Jamie Lyon	Parramatta Eels, Manly Warringah Sea Eagles	2000–2004, 2007–2016	1,554
5	2017	136	915	Jarrod Croker	Canberra Raiders	2009–2023	2,374
6	2026	100	517	**Reuben Garrick**	Manly Warringah Sea Eagles, **Sydney Roosters**	2019–	1,434

== See also ==
- List of National Rugby League players with five tries in a game
- List of players with 1,000 NRL points
- List of players with 20 NRL field goals
- List of players with 100 NRL tries
- List of players with 500 NRL goals
- List of players who have played 300 NRL games
