= List of players who have played 300 NRL games =

As of 4 October 2026, there have been 58 players who have played 300 or more games in the National Rugby League and its predecessors, the NSWRL, ARL and Super League premierships. Players still currently active are listed in bold.

Ranking	Games	No.	Reached in	Player	Club/clubs	Career span
1	430	24	2015	Cameron Smith	Melbourne Storm	2002–2020
2	379	49	2023	Daly Cherry-Evans	Manly Warringah Sea Eagles, Sydney Roosters	2011–2026
3	373	47	2023	**Ben Hunt**	**Brisbane Broncos**, St. George Illawarra Dragons	2009–
4	372	25	2016	Cooper Cronk	Melbourne Storm, Sydney Roosters	2004–2019
5	355	12	2009	Darren Lockyer	Brisbane Broncos	1995–2011
6	350	2	1994	Terry Lamb	Western Suburbs Magpies, Canterbury Bulldogs	1980–1996
7	349	9	2006	Steve Menzies	Manly Warringah Sea Eagles, Northern Eagles	1993–2008
8	348	29	2018	Paul Gallen	Cronulla-Sutherland Sharks	2001–2019
9	347	22	2015	Corey Parker	Brisbane Broncos	2001–2016
10	346	38	2019	Benji Marshall	Wests Tigers, St. George Illawarra Dragons, Brisbane Broncos, South Sydney Rabbitohs	2003–2021
11	342	52	2024	Josh Papali'i	Canberra Raiders	2011–2026
12	340	54	2025	**Dane Gagai**	**Brisbane Broncos**, Newcastle Knights, South Sydney Rabbitohs	2011–
=13	338	26	2017	Chris Heighington	Wests Tigers, Cronulla-Sutherland Sharks, Newcastle Knights	2003–2018
=13	338	46	2023	Jesse Bromwich	Melbourne Storm, Dolphins	2010–2024
15	337	35	2019	Darius Boyd	Brisbane Broncos, St. George Illawarra Dragons, Newcastle Knights	2006–2020
=16	336	6	2003	Brad Fittler	Penrith Panthers, Sydney Roosters	1989–2004
=16	336	32	2018	John Sutton	South Sydney Rabbitohs	2004–2019
18	332	4	1998	Cliff Lyons	North Sydney Bears, Manly Warringah Sea Eagles	1985–1999
19	331	36	2019	Adam Blair	Melbourne Storm, Wests Tigers, Brisbane Broncos, New Zealand Warriors	2006–2020
20	330	16	2011	Nathan Hindmarsh	Parramatta Eels	1998–2012
21	328	5	1999	Andrew Ettingshausen	Cronulla-Sutherland Sharks	1983–2000
=22	325	1	1988	Geoff Gerard	Parramatta Eels, Manly Warringah Sea Eagles, Penrith Panthers	1974–1989
=22	325	27	2017	Ryan Hoffman	Melbourne Storm, New Zealand Warriors	2003–2010, 2012–2018
=22	325	41	2020	Josh Morris	St. George Illawarra Dragons, Canterbury-Bankstown Bulldogs, Cronulla-Sutherland Sharks, Sydney Roosters	2007–2021
25	324	28	2017	Luke Lewis	Penrith Panthers, Cronulla-Sutherland Sharks	2001–2018
=26	323	30	2018	Johnathan Thurston	Bulldogs, North Queensland Cowboys	2002–2018
=26	323	37	2019	Gavin Cooper	North Queensland Cowboys, Gold Coast Titans, Penrith Panthers	2006–2020
=26	323	55	2025	Adam Reynolds	South Sydney Rabbitohs, Brisbane Broncos	2012–2026
29	319	31	2018	Billy Slater	Melbourne Storm	2003–2018
=30	318	8	2006	Jason Croker	Canberra Raiders	1991–2006
=30	318	53	2024	Kieran Foran	Manly Warringah Sea Eagles, Parramatta Eels, New Zealand Warriors, Canterbury-Bankstown Bulldogs, Gold Coast Titans	2009–2025
=32	317	13	2009	Hazem El Masri	Canterbury-Bankstown Bulldogs	1996–2009
=32	317	43	2022	Aiden Tolman	Melbourne Storm, Canterbury-Bankstown Bulldogs, Cronulla-Sutherland Sharks	2008–2022
34	316	50	2024	Jared Waerea-Hargreaves	Manly Warringah Sea Eagles, Sydney Roosters	2009–2024
=35	315	3	1998	Paul Langmack	Canterbury-Bankstown Bulldogs, Western Suburbs Magpies, Sydney City Roosters	1983–1999
=35	315	14	2010	Luke Priddis	Canberra Raiders, Brisbane Broncos, Penrith Panthers, St. George Illawarra Dragons	1997–2010
=37	313	11	2009	Steve Price	Bulldogs, New Zealand Warriors	1994–2009
=37	313	20	2014	Brent Kite	St. George Illawarra Dragons, Manly Warringah Sea Eagles, Penrith Panthers	2002–2015
39	311	10	2008	Ruben Wiki	Canberra Raiders, New Zealand Warriors	1993–2008
=40	309	17	2012	Petero Civoniceva	Brisbane Broncos, Penrith Panthers	1998–2012
=40	309	42	2021	Mitchell Pearce	Sydney Roosters, Newcastle Knights	2007–2021
=40	309	44	2022	Andrew McCullough	Brisbane Broncos, Newcastle Knights, St. George Illawarra Dragons	2008–2022
=40	309	56	2026	**Jason Taumalolo**	North Queensland Cowboys	2010–
=44	307	15	2010	Brett Kimmorley	Newcastle Knights, Hunter Mariners, Melbourne Storm, Northern Eagles, Cronulla-Sutherland Sharks, Canterbury-Bankstown Bulldogs	1995–2010
=44	307	45	2022	James Tamou	North Queensland Cowboys, Penrith Panthers, Wests Tigers	2009–2023
=44	307	48	2023	Jarrod Croker	Canberra Raiders	2009–2023
=44	307	51	2024	Michael Jennings	Penrith Panthers, Sydney Roosters, Parramatta Eels	2007–2020, 2024
=44	307	57	2026	Daniel Tupou	Sydney Roosters	2012–2026
=49	306	40	2020	Mitchell Aubusson	Sydney Roosters	2007–2020
=49	306	58	2026	**Tyson Frizell**	Cronulla-Sutherland Sharks, St. George Illawarra Dragons, Newcastle Knights, **Wests Tigers**	2011–
51	304	33	2018	Sam Thaiday	Brisbane Broncos	2003–2018
=52	303	23	2015	Anthony Watmough	Northern Eagles, Manly Warringah Sea Eagles, Parramatta Eels	2002–2015
=52	303	39	2019	Robbie Farah	Wests Tigers, South Sydney Rabbitohs	2003–2019
54	302	21	2014	Anthony Minichiello	Sydney Roosters	2000–2014
=55	301	7	2005	Luke Ricketson	Sydney Roosters	1991–2005
=55	301	34	2018	Simon Mannering	New Zealand Warriors	2005–2018
=57	300	18	2013	Scott Prince	North Queensland Cowboys, Brisbane Broncos, Wests Tigers, Gold Coast Titans	1998–2013
=57	300	19	2014	John Morris	Newcastle Knights, Parramatta Eels, Wests Tigers, Cronulla-Sutherland Sharks	2001–2014

== See also ==
- List of National Rugby League players with five tries in a game
- List of players with 1,000 NRL points
- List of players with 20 NRL field goals
- List of players with 100 NRL tries
- List of players with 100 NRL tries and 500 NRL goals
- List of players with 500 NRL goals
