= List of players with 1,000 points =

List of players with 1000 points may refer to:

- List of NHL players with 1,000 points
- List of players with 1,000 NRL points
