= List of players with 20 NRL field goals =

There have been 24 players who have kicked 20 or more field goals in the National Rugby League and its predecessors, the NSWRL, ARL and Super League premierships. Players still currently active are listed in bold.

| Field goals | No. | Reached in | Player | Club/clubs | Career span |
|---|---|---|---|---|---|
| 86 | 1 | 1968 | Eric Simms | South Sydney | 1965–1975 |
| 58 | 2 | 1968 | Bob Fulton | Manly-Warringah, Eastern Suburbs | 1966–1979 |
| 56 | 4 | 1969 | Phil Hawthorne | St. George, Eastern Suburbs | 1968–1972 |
| 45 | 5 | 1969 | Barry Glasgow | Western Suburbs, North Sydney | 1967–1973 |
| 45 | 10 | 1986 | Neil Baker | Canterbury-Bankstown Bulldogs, South Sydney Rabbitohs, Penrith Panthers | 1981–1989 |
| 44 | 7 | 1970 | Billy Smith | St. George | 1961–1977 |
| 44 | 11 | 1986 | Terry Lamb | Western Suburbs Magpies, Canterbury-Bankstown Bulldogs | 1980–1996 |
| 35 | 14 | 1995 | Jason Taylor | Western Suburbs Magpies, North Sydney Bears, Northern Eagles, Parramatta Eels | 1990–2001 |
| 33 | 9 | 1981 | Ken Wilson | Newtown Jets, Penrith Panthers | 1971–1983 |
| 33 | 13 | 1988 | Ben Elias | Balmain Tigers | 1982–1994 |
| 32 | 22 | 2019 | Daly Cherry-Evans | Manly Warringah Sea Eagles, Sydney Roosters | 2011–2026 |
| 30 | 6 | 1970 | Dennis Ward | Canterbury-Bankstown, Manly Warringah Sea Eagles | 1964–1972 |
| 30 | 12 | 1987 | Tony Melrose | Parramatta Eels, South Sydney Rabbitohs, Manly Warringah Sea Eagles, Eastern Suburbs | 1980–1989 |
| 28 | 23 | 2020 | Adam Reynolds | South Sydney Rabbitohs, Brisbane Broncos | 2012–2026 |
| 27 | 15 | 1995 | Ricky Stuart | Canberra Raiders, Canterbury Bulldogs | 1988–2000 |
| 26 | 19 | 2014 | Jamie Soward | Sydney Roosters, St. George Illawarra Dragons, Penrith Panthers | 2005–2016 |
| 25 | 3 | 1968 | Kevin Ashley | Eastern Suburbs | 1963–1969 |
| 25 | 21 | 2018 | James Maloney | Melbourne Storm, New Zealand Warriors, Sydney Roosters, Cronulla-Sutherland Sharks, Penrith Panthers | 2009–2019 |
| 23 | 16 | 1998 | John Simon | Illawarra Steelers, Sydney City Roosters, Parramatta Eels, Auckland Warriors, Wests Tigers | 1990–2001 |
| 22 | 17 | 2002 | Andrew Johns | Newcastle Knights | 1993–2007 |
| 21 | 8 | 1970 | Dave Bolton | Balmain | 1965–1970 |
| 21 | 18 | 2011 | Darren Lockyer | Brisbane Broncos | 1995–2011 |
| 21 | 20 | 2016 | Cooper Cronk | Melbourne Storm, Sydney Roosters | 2004–2019 |
| 20 | 24 | 2024 | Chad Townsend | Cronulla-Sutherland Sharks, New Zealand Warriors, North Queensland Cowboys, Sydney Roosters | 2011–2025 |

== See also ==
- List of National Rugby League players with five tries in a game
- List of players who have played 300 NRL games
- List of players with 1,000 NRL points
- List of players with 100 NRL tries
- List of players with 100 NRL tries and 500 NRL goals
- List of players with 500 NRL goals
