= Alex Johnston (rugby league) =

Australia & PNG international rugby league footballer

Alex "AJ" Johnston
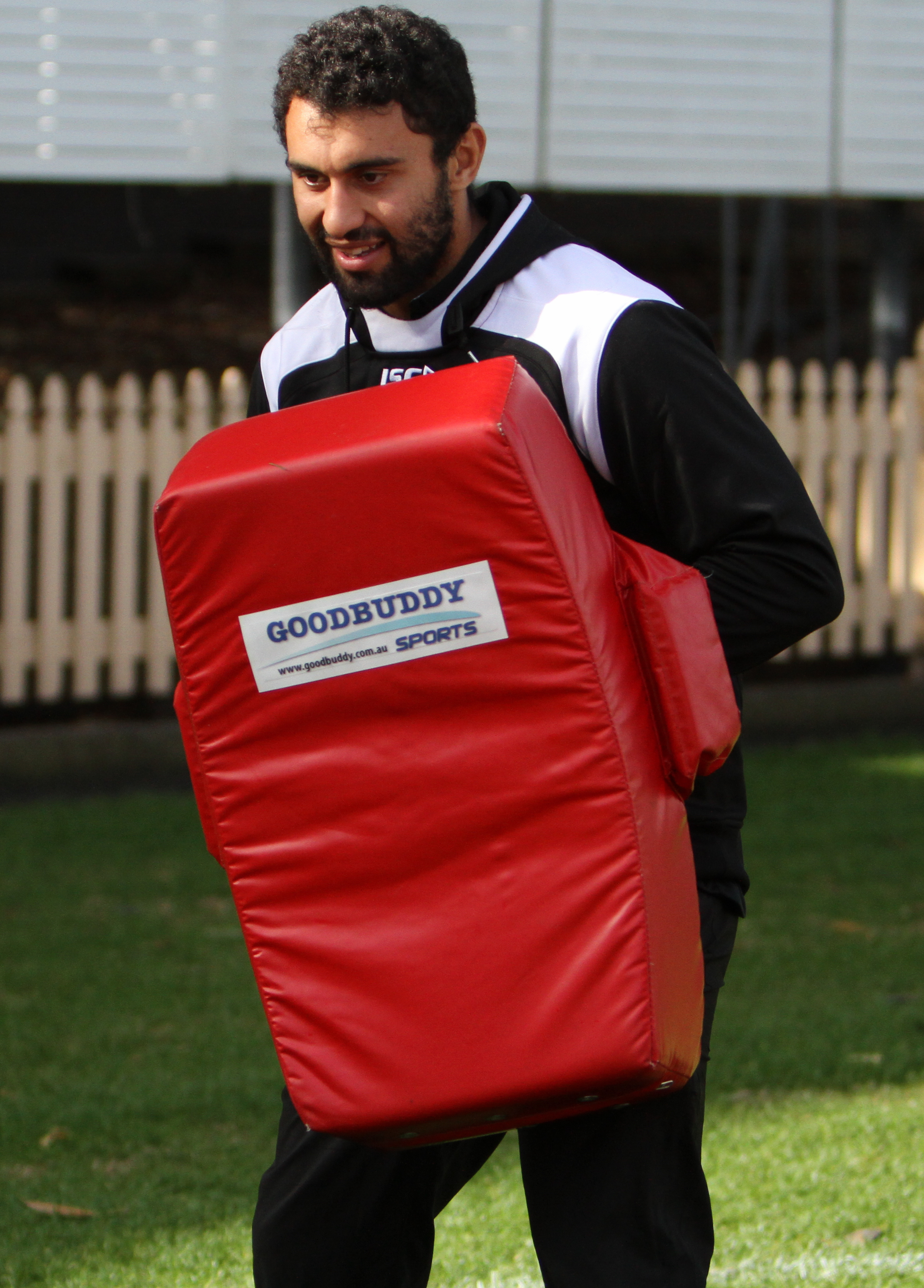

Personal information
- Full name: Alex Johnston
- Born: 14 January 1995 (age 31) Sydney, New South Wales, Australia
- Height: 185 cm (6 ft 1 in)
- Weight: 95 kg (14 st 13 lb)

Playing information
- Position: Wing, Fullback
Club
Years	Team	Pld	T	G	FG	P
2014–	South Sydney	265	240	0	0	960
2028	PNG Chiefs
	Total	265	240	0	0	960
Representative
Years	Team	Pld	T	G	FG	P
2015–21	Indigenous All Stars	4	1	0	0	4
2015	Australia	1	0	0	0	0
2015	Prime Minister's XIII	1	0	0	0	0
2019–25	Papua New Guinea	12	4	0	0	16
- Source: As of 11 September 2026

Alex Johnston (born 14 January 1995) is a professional rugby league footballer who plays as a winger for the South Sydney Rabbitohs in the National Rugby League. He has played for both Australia and Papua New Guinea at international level. Johnston is the highest try scorer in Australian first-grade rugby league history.

He played for the Indigenous All Stars and the Prime Minister's XIII at representative level, and won the 2014 NRL Grand Final with the South Sydney club. He played as a fullback earlier in his NRL career as well as at international level.

== Background ==
Johnston was born in Sydney, New South Wales, Australia. He is of Torres Strait Islander heritage from Saibai Island, and of Papua New Guinean heritage from Lumi, Sandaun Province.

Johnston grew up playing junior rugby league for La Perouse United. He attended Endeavour Sports High School, where he completed the HSC and was dux of his grade in 2012. As a youngster, Johnston played for the New South Wales Under 16s and 18s teams and Australian Schoolboys team. In 2013, Johnston played for the South Sydney Rabbitohs' S. G. Ball Cup and NYC teams before moving on to the Rabbitohs' New South Wales Cup team, North Sydney Bears in 2014.

As a teenager, Johnston was also a prominent schoolboy cricketer, playing as an opening batsman.

== Playing career ==
=== 2014 ===
In round 8 of the 2014 NRL season, Johnston was selected to make his NRL debut for the South Sydney Rabbitohs on the wing against the Brisbane Broncos, at Suncorp Stadium on Anzac Day replacing Nathan Merritt and scoring a try in his team's 28–26 win. He continued to perform on both the left and right wing throughout the year. At times, Johnston was referred to as the successor of Greg Inglis, for his ability to play fullback as well as wing. In round 21, Johnston scored his first ever hat-trick against the Newcastle Knights in the Rabbitohs 50–10 victory. On 5 October 2014, in Souths 2014 NRL Grand Final against the Canterbury-Bankstown Bulldogs, Johnston played on the wing and scored the first try of the match to lead the South Sydney Rabbitohs 30–6 victory. Johnston finished his brilliant debut year in the NRL as the competitions highest tryscorer with 21 tries in 18 matches. In September 2014, he received an offer to play for his maternal grandmother's native Papua New Guinea.

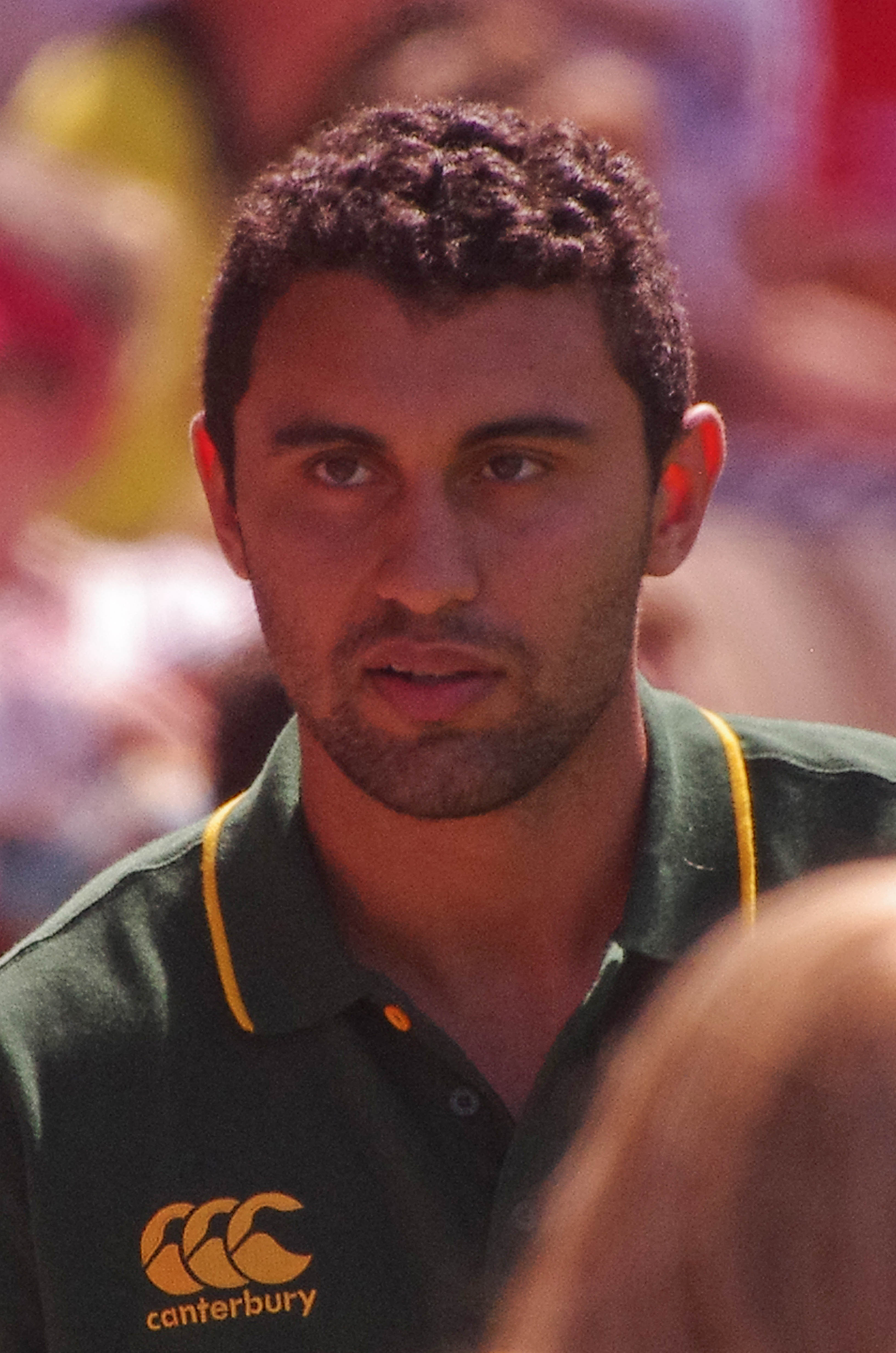
Johnston at the 2014 Rugby League Four Nations

On 14 October 2014, Johnston was selected for the Australia Kangaroos 2014 Four Nations squad but didn't make an appearance in any of Australia's four matches.

=== 2015 ===
On 13 February 2015, Johnston played on the wing for the Indigenous All Stars against the NRL All Stars in the 2015 All Stars match at Cbus Super Stadium, the Indigenous side winning 20–6. On 23 February, he played for the Rabbitohs in the 2015 World Club Challenge match against 2014 Super League Grand Final premiers St. Helens, playing on the wing in the Rabbitohs' 39–0 win at Langtree Park. For the 2015 Anzac Test, he was selected to make his debut for Australia against New Zealand, playing on the wing in the Kangaroos' 12–26 loss at Suncorp Stadium. On 13 May, he re-signed with South Sydney on a 2-year contract to the end of the 2017 season. On 8 July, he was selected to be 18th man for the New South Wales team for Game 3 of the 2015 State of Origin series. He finished off the 2015 season as South Sydney's highest try-scorer with 17 tries in 25 matches. On 26 September, he played for the Prime Minister's XIII against Papua New Guinea, playing on the wing and scoring a try in his team's 40–12 win at Port Moresby. On 15 December, he was named on the wing for the Indigenous All Stars team to play the World All Stars on 13 February 2016.

=== 2016 ===
On 13 January, Johnston was named in the emerging New South Wales Blues squad. In February, he played for South Sydney in the 2016 NRL Auckland Nines, scoring the opening try of the competition. He was selected on the wing and scored four tries in South Sydney's first three matches of the season before sustaining a hamstring injury that saw him sit out for several weeks. In his return game in round 10 against the Parramatta Eels, he played in his preferred position at fullback in a 22–20 win. He was renamed in the fullback position in round 15, once again against the Eels. He was then moved back and forth as the club attempted to find a line-up that would win for them. In round 23, Johnston played on the wing when South Sydney broke their nine-game losing streak with a 41–22 win over the New Zealand Warriors. He played there in each of the three final games which were all won by South Sydney. Johnston finished the 2016 season with 11 tries from 18 matches.

=== 2017 ===
In round 1 of the 2017 season, South Sydney fullback, Greg Inglis suffered what was deemed to be a season-ending injury to his anterior cruciate ligament (ACL) in the club's 18–34 defeat by the Wests Tigers. In round 2, Johnston was named at fullback for the club's clash with the Manly-Warringah Sea Eagles. Johnston scored two tries in the position in his sides' 18–38 win at Brookvale Oval. On 14 June he re-signed with the South Sydney club until the end of the 2020 season. On 2 July he scored five tries against Penrith to be the first Souths player since Nathan Merritt in 2011 to achieve five tries in a match. In round 21, Alex Johnston was switched back to fullback after poor performances by Souths who were on a three-game losing streak. He scored an amazing try in South Sydney's 32 - 18 loss against Canberra. He then went on to score six tries in his next three games and was the leading try scorer with 2 rounds to go. However, against the New Zealand Warriors in round 24, Johnston injured his hamstring as he was scoring a try in the 36 - 18 win. He was ruled out for the rest of the season, with South Sydney losing their last two matches. Johnston finished season 2017 with him playing 22 matches and scoring 22 tries, the second highest tryscorer that year.

Johnston expressed an interest in representing Papua New Guinea at the 2017 Rugby League World Cup, but was unavailable due to injury.

=== 2018 ===
Johnston was part of the South Sydney side which returned to form in 2018 finishing 3rd on the table at the end of the regular season. Johnston made 24 appearances for Souths scoring 8 tries as the club finished one game short of the grand final losing to Sydney Roosters 12–4.

=== 2019 ===
Johnston began the 2019 NRL season as South Sydney's first choice fullback. South Sydney started the year off winning 8 of their first 9 games. Following Souths 19–18 loss against Penrith in round 14, Johnston was ruled out with a knee injury. In round 24, Johnston returned to the Souths side and scored a try as they defeated the New Zealand Warriors 31–10 at Mt. Smart Stadium.

At the end of the 2019 regular season, Souths finished third on the table and qualified for the finals. Johnston scored a try in the club's 34–26 victory over Manly-Warringah in the semi-final at ANZ Stadium. The following week, Johnston played in South Sydney's preliminary final loss against the Canberra Raiders at Canberra Stadium.

=== 2020 ===
In round 12 of the 2020 NRL season, Johnston scored a hat-trick as South Sydney defeated St. George 32–24 at Kogarah Oval.

In round 14, Johnston scored two tries as South Sydney defeated North Queensland 31–30 at the Queensland Country Bank Stadium.

The following week, Johnston scored two tries as Souths defeated Manly-Warringah 56–16 at ANZ Stadium.

In mid-2020, it was reported that Johnston was likely to leave South Sydney at the end of the season. It is believed that several clubs were interested in signing Johnston, particularly Melbourne and Wests Tigers. On 9 September, Johnston signed a two-year contract to stay at South Sydney until the end of 2022. Johnston wrote a letter to South Sydney's coach Wayne Bennett expressing how much the club meant to him, which convinced Bennett to re-sign Johnston. At the same time, an online petition attracted 2,500 signatures pressuring South Sydney to re-sign Johnston.

In the final round of the 2020 NRL season, Johnston scored five tries as Souths defeated bitter rivals the Sydney Roosters 60–8 at ANZ Stadium.

In the 2020 elimination final, Johnston scored two tries for Souths in their 46–20 victory over Newcastle at ANZ Stadium.

Johnston made a total of 22 appearances throughout the season as Souths reached their third straight preliminary final but lost 20–16 against Penrith. Johnston finished as the year's top try scorer with 23 tries.

=== 2021 ===
In round 1 of the 2021 NRL season, he scored two tries in a 26–18 loss against Melbourne.

In round 12, Johnston scored a hat-trick in South Sydney's 38–20 victory over Parramatta.

In round 14, Johnston scored his second hat-trick of the season in a 24–10 victory over Newcastle. The following week, he scored two tries for South Sydney in a 46–0 victory over Brisbane. In round 16, he scored two tries in a 38–22 victory over Wests Tigers at an empty Leichhardt Oval, which took Johnston to the top of the try scorers list.

In round 17, Johnston scored a hat-trick during South Sydney's 46–18 victory over North Queensland.

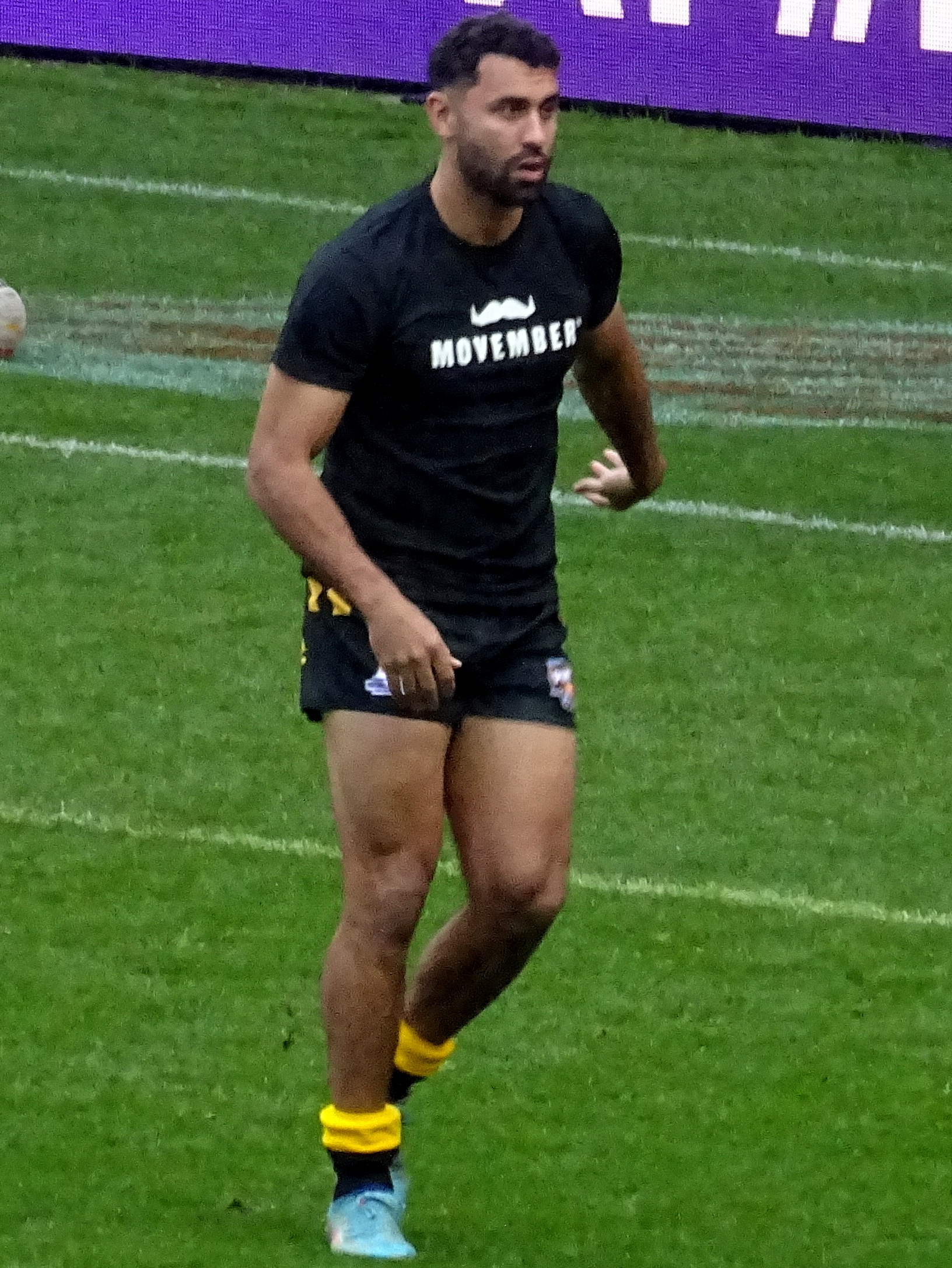
Johnston warming up for PNG at the 2021 RLWC

In round 18, he scored two tries for South Sydney in a 32–24 victory over Canterbury.

On 19 July, Johnston was ruled out from playing for a month with a hamstring injury.

In round 24, Johnson scored a hat-trick during South Sydney's 54–12 victory over arch-rivals the Sydney Roosters.

In the 2021 Finals Series, Johnston scored two tries for South Sydney in their preliminary final victory over Manly which booked Souths a place in the grand final for only the second time since their 1971 triumph. On 27 September, Johnston was awarded the Ken Irvine Medal for being the league's top try scorer with 27 tries. Johnston scored his 30th try for the season (including finals) in South Sydney's 2021 NRL Grand Final loss to Penrith. In doing so, he broke the record for most tries scored by a Souths player in a season which was held by Les Brennan for over 60 years.

On 18 October, Johnston signed a contract extension with the South Sydney club until at least the end of the 2025 season.

=== 2022 ===
In round 6 of the 2022 NRL season, he scored two tries in South Sydney's 36–16 victory over Canterbury.

In round 12 of the 2022 NRL season, he scored a hat-trick in South Sydney's 44–18 victory over West Tigers to become South Sydney's all-time leading try scorer.

In round 14, Johnston scored a hat-trick in South Sydney's victory over the Gold Coast.

In round 16, Johnston scored two tries in a 30–12 victory over Parramatta. In round 19, Johnston scored two tries for South Sydney in their 24–12 victory over Melbourne.

In round 20, Johnston scored one try in a 21–20 loss to Cronulla to enter the top 10 try scorers in NRL history.

Johnston played a total of 25 matches for South Sydney across the season but he missed the clubs preliminary final defeat to eventual premiers Penrith through injury. Johnston finished as the competitions top try scorer with 30 tries, and the first player in history to score 30 tries in a season twice.

=== 2023 ===
In round 10 of the 2023 NRL season, Johnston played his 200th first grade game and scored two tries in South Sydney's 28–12 victory over Melbourne. In round 14, Johnston scored a hat-trick in South Sydney's 46–28 victory over the Gold Coast. In round 22, Johnston scored another hat-trick in South Sydney's 32–18 victory over the Wests Tigers in Tamworth.

=== 2024 ===
Following South Sydney's round 4 victory over Canterbury in the 2024 NRL season, it was announced that Johnston would be ruled out indefinitely with a hamstring injury. In round 11, Johnston made his return to the team and scored a try in their 28-22 loss to North Queensland. On 25th May 2024 against Parramatta, Johnston scored his 190th try, which put him equal second with Billy Slater on the all time scorers' leaderboard. In round 15, Johnston scored his 191st try which was the most by any player at a single club in the competition's 116-year history. In round 21, Johnston was taken from the field with a season-ending Achilles injury.

=== 2025 ===
In round 4 of the 2025 NRL season, Johnston made his long awaited comeback in South Sydney's 28-18 upset victory over Penrith scoring a try. Johnston was later taken from the field during the first half with an injury and did not return for the rest of the match. Johnston scored three tries in a narrow loss to the New Zealand Warriors in round 13 of the 2025 NRL season. In scoring three tries, Johnston become the second player in NSWRL/NRL history to score 200 career tries. In round 16, Johnston scored four tries for South Sydney in their 25-24 golden point extra-time loss against Melbourne. On 22 July, the Rabbitohs announced that Johnston had signed a two year extension with the club.

=== 2026 ===
During round 2 of the NRL season, Johnston broke the all time record of try scoring surpassing Ken Irvine by scoring his 213th try of his NRL career. Fans stormed the field to celebrate with Johnston in the moment. The sitting Prime Minister of Australia Anthony Albanese, a life-long fan of the South Sydney club, was among those who entered the playing field. In round 8 against the Storm, Johnston scored 2 tries in his 250th NRL game. The match coincided with South Sydney's first ever victory against the Storm in Melbourne. On 28 April, it was reported that Johnston had signed with the PNG Chiefs from 2028. In round 9 against the Knights, Johnston crossed for another double in a thrilling 42-38 loss. On 6 May, the Papua New Guinea Chiefs officially announced the signing of Johnston on a one-year deal from 2028, he was the clubs second signing.

== Try-scoring record ==
On 13 March 2026 against the Sydney Roosters at Allianz Stadium, Johnston scored the 212th and 213th tries of his career to equal, and then surpass, the long-standing Australian try-scoring record set by Ken Irvine. Irvine retired in 1973 with a total of 212 tries, which was widely considered for several decades to be an unbreakable record.

Johnston finished as the NRL's top try-scorer during the 2020, 2021, 2022 and 2026 seasons, for which he was awarded the Ken Irvine Medal. (Note: The Ken Irvine Medal (known as the Dally M Top Tryscorer of the Year prior to 2018) is awarded based on tries scored during the regular NRL season only, excluding finals matches. When including finals matches, Johnston also finished as the league's leading try-scorer in 2014.) Johnston scored 30 tries in each of the 2021, 2022 and 2026 seasons, which is a record of the modern era. (Note: In the history of Australian rugby league, Johnston's 30-try seasons in 2021 and 2022 are bettered only by Dave Brown (38 in 1935) and Ray Preston (34 in 1954).)

In 2022, Australian sports media began to speculate that Johnston, who was then 27 years old, could eventually break Irvine's record.

The Sydney Morning Herald noted that Johnston played the entire 2018 season at fullback due to injuries in South Sydney's squad, rather than as a winger. Johnston scored only 8 tries in 2018, whereas his replacement on the wing, Robert Jennings, scored 19 tries.

== Playing style ==
Johnston's preferred position is fullback. Despite this, Johnston has played the majority of career for South Sydney on the left wing. Of the first 211 tries in his NRL career, 158 were scored at left wing.

Fox Sports said of Johnston in 2026, "[his] knack for crossing the line was evident early on, according to those around him. He had great hands following a handy junior cricket career, plus a great read in attack, remarkable speed and, above all else, composure."

== Statistics ==
Year	Team	Games	Tries	Pts
2014	South Sydney Rabbitohs	18	21	84
2015	South Sydney Rabbitohs	25	17	68
2016	South Sydney Rabbitohs	18	11	44
2017	South Sydney Rabbitohs	22	22	88
2018	South Sydney Rabbitohs	24	8	32
2019	South Sydney Rabbitohs	15	4	16
2020	South Sydney Rabbitohs	22	23	92
2021	South Sydney Rabbitohs	22	30	120
2022	South Sydney Rabbitohs	25	30	120
2023	South Sydney Rabbitohs	23	21	84
2024	South Sydney Rabbitohs	13	8	32
2025	South Sydney Rabbitohs	15	15	60
2026	South Sydney Rabbitohs	22	30	120
	Totals	265	240	960
