= Adam Reynolds =

Australian rugby league footballer

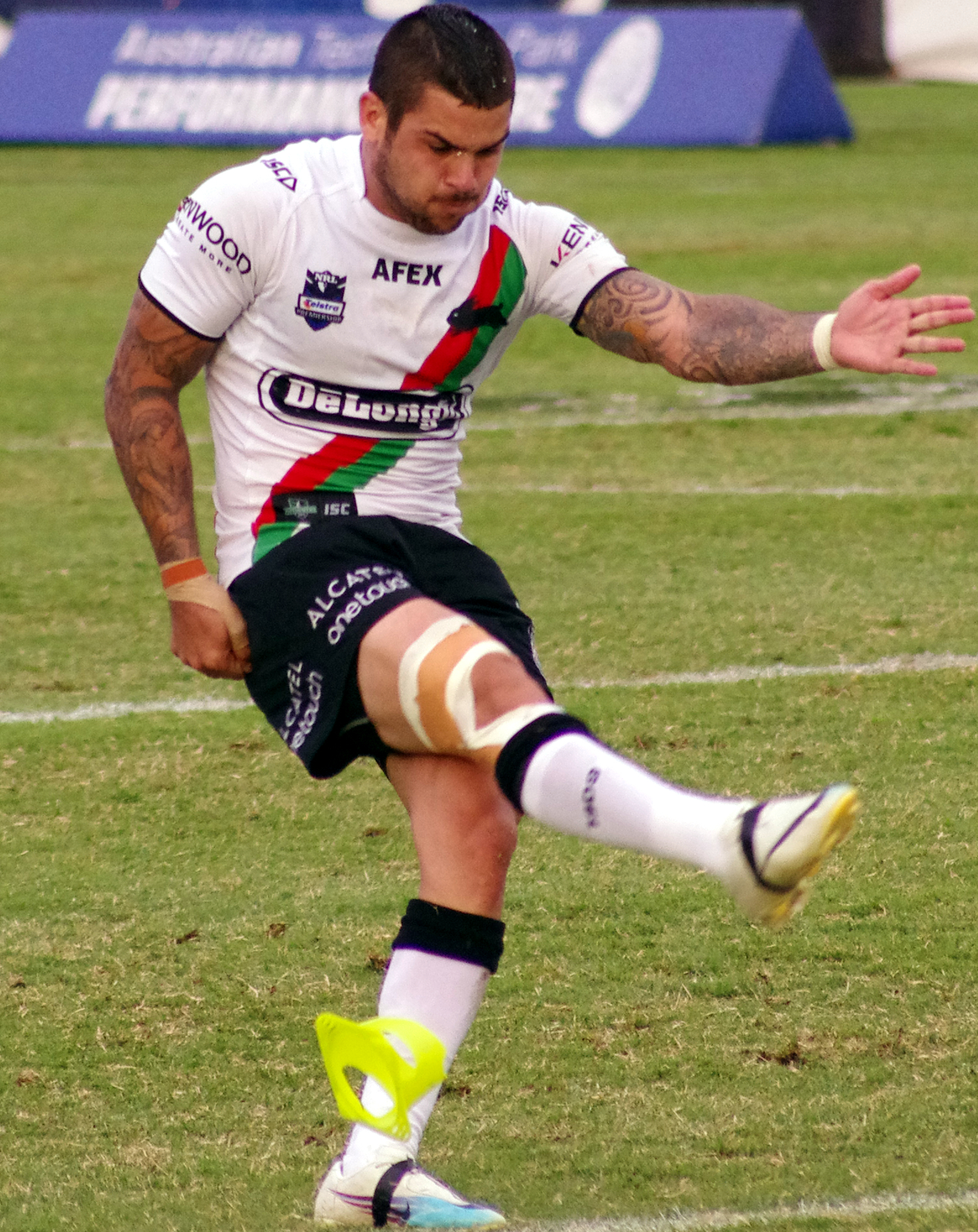

Personal information
- Full name: Adam Robert Reynolds
- Born: 10 July 1990 (age 36) Sydney, New South Wales, Australia

Playing information
- Height: 173 cm (5 ft 8 in)
- Weight: 85 kg (13 st 5 lb)
- Position: Halfback
Club
Years	Team	Pld	T	G	FG	P
2012–21	South Sydney	231	38	860	22	1896
2022–26	Brisbane Broncos	92	19	309	6	702
	Total	323	57	1169	28	2598
Representative
Years	Team	Pld	T	G	FG	P
2013–16	NRL All Stars	2	0	3	0	6
2013–14	NSW City	2	1	5	0	14
2015	Prime Minister's XIII	1	0	2	0	4
2016	World All Stars	1	0	2	0	4
2016	New South Wales	2	0	3	0	6

Adam Robert Reynolds (born 10 July 1990) is an Australian former professional rugby league footballer who last played as a halfback for the Brisbane Broncos, who he also captained, in the National Rugby League (NRL).

Reynolds previously played for the South Sydney Rabbitohs, who he also captained, and played in a total of four grand finals; a 2014 victory and 2021 defeat with South Sydney, plus a 2023 defeat and 2025 victory with Brisbane.

Reynolds played at representative level for City New South Wales in City vs Country Origin, the NRL All Stars and World All Stars in the All Stars match, Prime Minister's XIII, and New South Wales in the State of Origin series.

Known for his precise kicking, Reynolds is the second-highest point scorer and goal scorer in NRL history.

== Background ==
Reynolds was born in Sydney, New South Wales, Australia, and attended Matraville Sports High School. Andrew Johns, Matthew Johns and Darren Lockyer were his favourite players when he was a kid and Nathan Merritt is his favourite South Sydney player of all time. He then added when asked "who is the most inspirational player or person on your career and how have they positively affected your football?", he responded "My brother – he's always on my back telling me to do extras and pushing me to be the best I can be". In 2007, Reynolds was part of the team from Matraville Sports High School that won the NRL Schoolboy Cup 32–10 against Patrician Brothers' College Blacktown. Reynolds received the Peter Sterling Medal as the "most outstanding player in the competition" that year.

== Playing career ==
=== Early years ===
Reynolds played his junior rugby league for St Peters JRLFC, Alexandria Rovers, La Perouse Panthers and Kensington United in the South Sydney Juniors competition. He played for the New South Wales under-17s team in 2007. Reynolds graduated to the Rabbitohs' Under-20s team in 2009 and in the 2010 Toyota Cup season he was one of the leading lights in the South Sydney side that went to the Grand Final. Reynolds played 46 games, scored 21 tries and kicked 159 goals for 402 points in his U20s career.

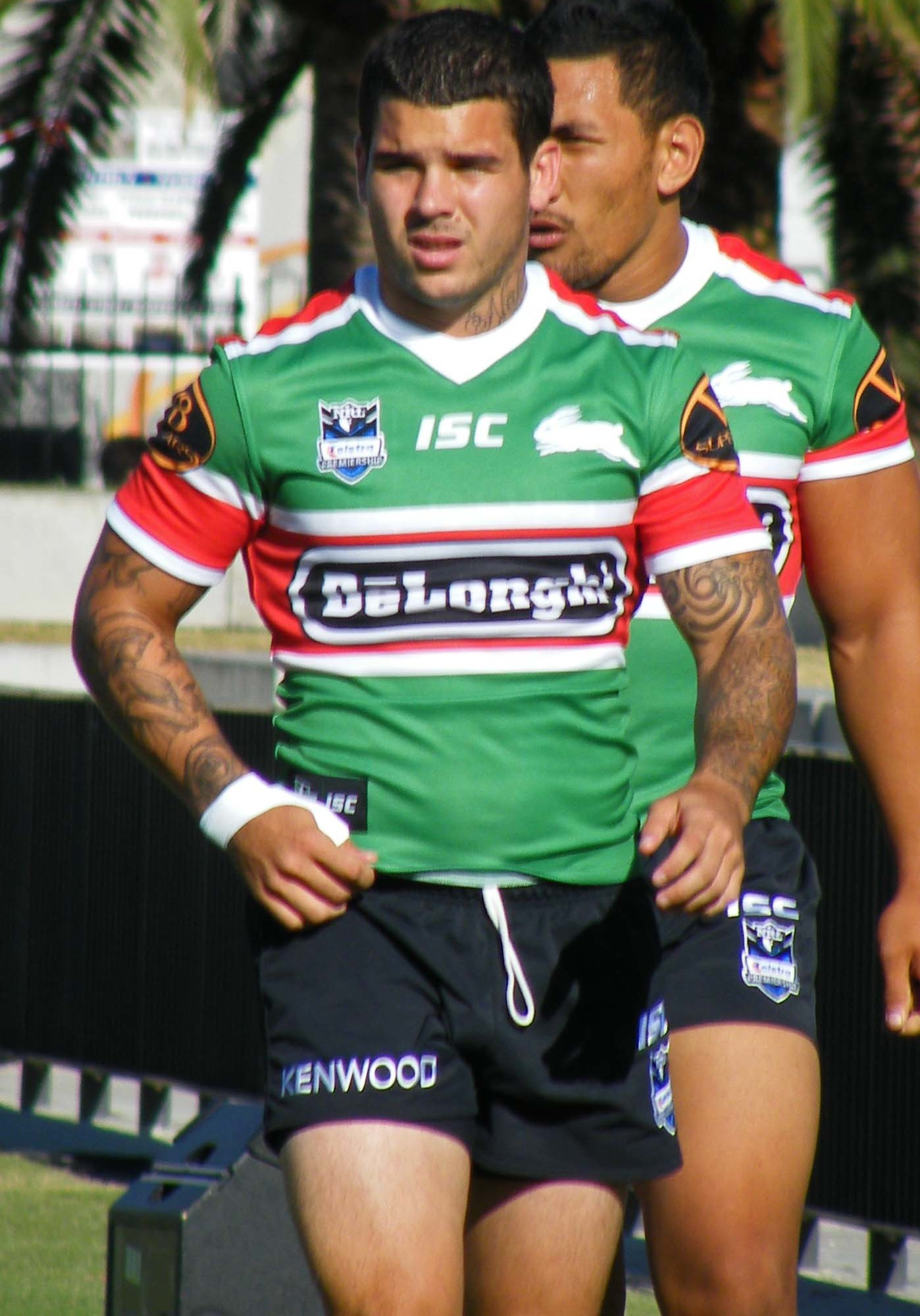
Reynolds playing for the Rabbitohs in 2011

=== 2012 ===
After the highly publicised departure of Chris Sandow, Reynolds joined the South Sydney NRL squad in 2012.

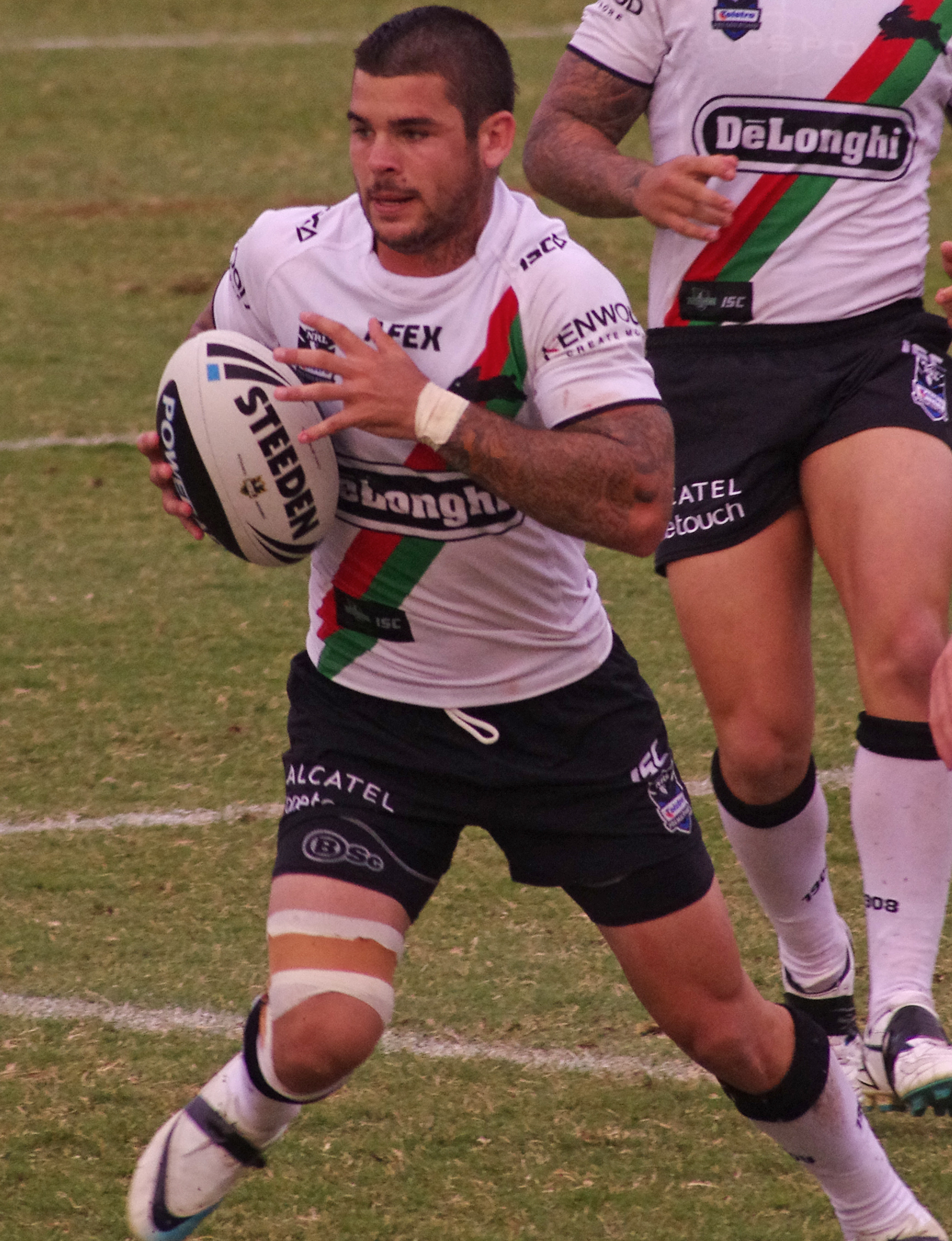
Reynolds playing for Souths in 2012

In Round 1 of the 2012 NRL season, Reynolds made his NRL debut for the South Sydney Rabbitohs against the Sydney Roosters at halfback, kicking 4 goals in the Rabbitohs 24–20 last minute loss at ANZ Stadium. In Round 11, against the St George Illawarra Dragons, Reynolds scored his first NRL career try and also kicked a field goal to win the match for South Sydney 19–18 in golden-point extra time at WIN Stadium. On 16 August 2012, Reynolds re-signed with South Sydney on a three-year contract to the end of the 2015 season.

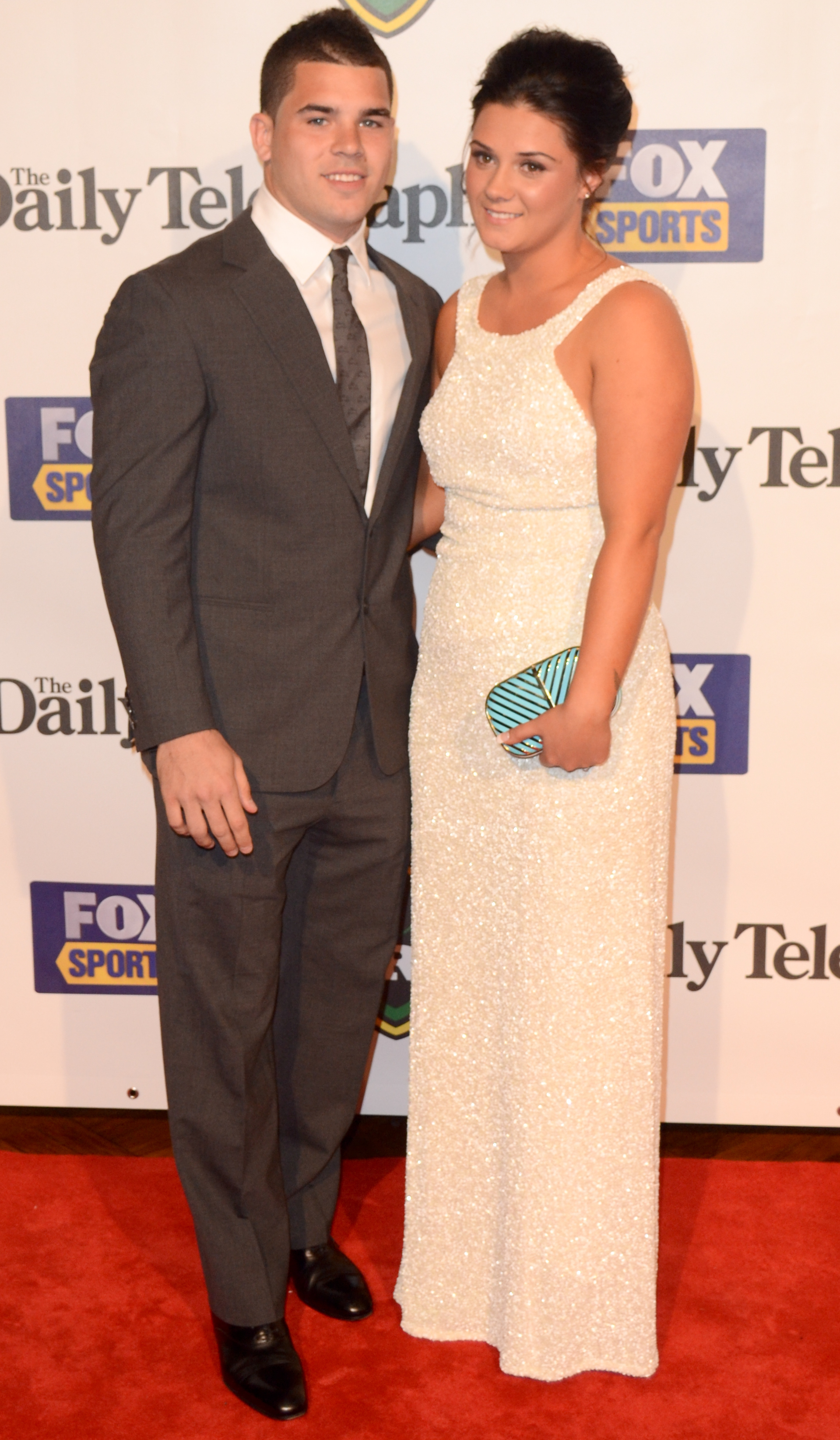
Reynolds with his partner, Tallara Simon-Phillips at the 2012 Dally M Awards

At the end of season 2012 Dally M Awards he was named the NRL's rookie of the year. Reynolds also finished the season as the NRL's highest goal scorer with 97. Reynolds was crowned the John Sattler Rookie of the Year and Members Choice Player of the Year at the South Sydney Red and Green Ball in 2012, among other awards. Reynolds played in all of South Sydney's 27 matches, scored 3 tries, kicked over 97 goals and kicked 2 field goals in an impressive debut year in the National Rugby League in the 2012 season.

=== 2013 ===
On 13 February 2013, Reynolds was chosen to play for the NRL All Stars team at halfback, kicking a goal in the 32–6 loss to the Indigenous All Stars at Suncorp Stadium.

On 21 April 2013, Reynolds debuted for NSW City Origin, scoring a try and kicking 2 goals from 2 attempts in the 18–12 loss against NSW Country Origin in Coffs Harbour.

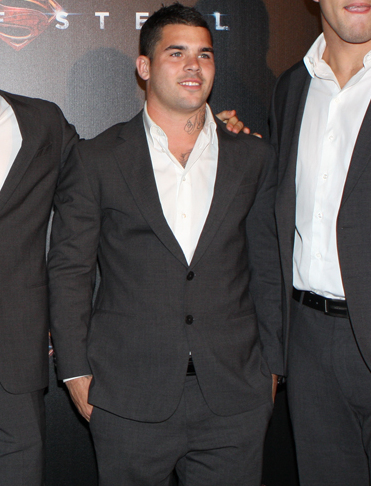
Reynolds at the Man of Steel premiere in 2013

Reynolds' 2013 NRL season was also another success both in goal kicking and overall playing as halfback. With the likes of team-mates John Sutton, Issac Luke, Greg Inglis and Nathan Merritt he was able to guide the Souths to a second place ladder finish at the end of the regular season. Their finals campaign started off well with South Sydney beating the Melbourne Storm 20–10 in the first week, but eventually being defeated in the preliminary finals 30–20 by Manly-Warringah Sea Eagles, making it the second year in a row for them to bow out one game before the Grand Final. Reynolds played in all the Rabbitohs 26 matches, scoring 4 tries, kicking 100 goals and kicking 2 field goals in the 2013 season.

=== 2014 ===
On 4 May 2014, Reynolds was selected to play for NSW City in the City vs Country Origin match, Reynolds played at halfback and kicked 3 goals in the 26-all draw in Dubbo, New South Wales. On 5 October 2014, in South Sydney's 2014 NRL Grand Final against the Canterbury-Bankstown Bulldogs, Reynolds played at halfback, scored a try and kicked 5 from 7 goals in Souths 30–6 victory. Reynolds finished off his solid year with South Sydney in the 2014 NRL season with him playing 26 matches, scoring 7 tries, kicking 95 goals and kicking 3 field goals.

=== 2015 ===
On 27 January 2015, Reynolds extended his contract on a two-year deal, estimated $500,000 per season. On 23 January 2015, Reynolds was named in the South Sydney Rabbitohs tournament-winning 2015 NRL Auckland Nines squad. Reynolds was named the Player of the Tournament. In Round 5, against the Canterbury-Bankstown Bulldogs, Reynolds suffered a knee injury that could have seen him sidelined for up to 6–8 weeks after Bulldogs prop and captain James Graham ran into him to charge down a field goal attempt in the dying minutes. The Rabbitohs were awarded a penalty and team-mate Bryson Goodwin kicked the penalty goal to win the match for the Rabbitohs 18–17 at ANZ Stadium.

Reynolds returned early, in Round 9 against the St. George Illawarra Dragons, and helped South Sydney to a 16–10 win at ANZ Stadium, snapping his team's three match losing streak, However he suffered a thumb injury that could have see him out for up to 8 weeks. Reynolds again made an early comeback from injury in Round 14 against the Wests Tigers in South Sydney's 34–6 loss at ANZ Stadium.

Reynolds finished the 2015 NRL season as South Sydney's highest point scorer with him scoring a try, kicking 53 goals and kicking a field goal in 18 matches. On 26 September 2015, Reynolds played for the Prime Minister's XIII against Papua New Guinea at halfback and kicked 2 goals in the 40–12 win at Port Moresby. On 11 December 2015, Reynolds and Souths officials dismissed rumours that he wanted a release from the club to join the Gold Coast Titans with departed 2014 premiership winning team-mate Chris McQueen.

=== 2016 ===
On 13 January 2016, Reynolds was named in the emerging New South Wales Blues squad. On 2 February 2016, Reynolds was selected to replace Trent Hodkinson for the World All Stars in the 2016 All Stars match. In the match on 13 February 2016, Reynolds kicked 2 goals with the World All Stars defeating the Indigenous All Stars 12–8 at Suncorp Stadium. Reynolds made his State of Origin debut for New South Wales in Game I of the 2016 series.

Reynolds played in the second game of the 2016 State of Origin series as Queensland defeated New South Wales 26–16 at Suncorp Stadium. Reynolds was ruled out of the final game in the series due to injury and was replaced by James Tedesco who made his origin debut at fullback, shifting Matt Moylan to five eighth. At club level, Reynolds made 16 appearances for Souths in the 2016 NRL season as they missed out on the finals for the first time since 2012.

=== 2017 ===
Despite Souths missing the finals for a second straight season, Reynolds had a relatively good year and made 21 appearances for the club. Reynolds missed out on origin selection for New South Wales being beaten to the number 7 jersey by Mitchell Pearce. One of the highlights in the season for Reynolds was his goal kicking. Reynolds finished the season with a goal kicking percentage of 88.16%.

=== 2018 ===
In 2018, Reynolds was part of the South Sydney side which finished third on the table at the end of the regular season. In week two of the finals, Reynolds kicked 3 field goals including one in the final minute of the match as Souths defeated St George 13–12. It was the first time a player had kicked 3 field goals in a match since Jason Taylor in the 1997 season. In the preliminary final against the Sydney Roosters, Reynolds kicked two penalty goals but Souths finished short of a grand final appearance losing 12–4.

=== 2019 ===
Reynolds began the 2019 NRL season in good form as Souths began the year winning 10 of their first 11 games. Reynolds form meant that he was in contention for selection in the New South Wales origin team. In round 11 against Wests Tigers, Reynolds scored a try and kicked 3 goals but was taken from the field with what was suspected to be severe leg injury. Reynolds was later cleared of any damage but was overlooked for origin selection with NSW coach Brad Fittler opting to pick Nathan Cleary at halfback.

In round 17 against Manly-Warringah, Reynolds kicked a field goal in the dying minutes as South Sydney won 21–20 at ANZ Stadium breaking a four-game losing streak.

South Sydney would finished the 2019 regular season in third spot on the table and qualified for the finals. Reynolds played in all three of South Sydney's finals matches as the club reached the preliminary final for a second straight year but were defeated by Canberra 16–10 at Canberra Stadium.

=== 2020 ===
On 25 February, Reynolds was announced as the new captain of South Sydney. Reynolds spoke to the media saying "I grew up across the road from Redfern Oval in apartments on Elizabeth Street and always wanted to play for Souths, so to have the chance to captain the team is amazing".

In round 14, Reynolds scored a try, kicked five goals and a last-gasp field goal as South Sydney defeated North Queensland 31–30 at the Queensland Country Bank Stadium.

In round 15, Reynolds kicked nine goals from nine attempts as South Sydney defeated Manly-Warringah 56–16 at ANZ Stadium.

In round 20, he kicked ten goals in South Sydney's 60–8 victory over bitter rivals the Sydney Roosters at ANZ Stadium.

Reynolds played 23 games throughout the year as the club reached their third preliminary final in a row but fell once again of a grand final appearance losing to Penrith 20–16. He also finished as the competition's top point scorer with 221 points

=== 2021 ===
In round 4 of the 2021 NRL season, he scored a try and kicked seven goals in South Sydney's 38–0 victory over Canterbury-Bankstown.

In round 5 against Brisbane, he kicked the first two-point field goal since 1970. The scoring option was reintroduced by the NRL at the start of the season, with shots taken from behind the 40-metre line awarded the 2 points, similar to the three-point line in the NBA. In round 8 against Canberra, he kicked seven goals from seven attempts as South Sydney won the match 34–20.

On 2 May, it was revealed that Reynolds suffered a thumb injury in the victory over Canberra and was ruled out for a match. The following week, without Reynolds and a host of other starters, South Sydney went down 50–0 to the Melbourne Storm.

On 12 May, after weeks of speculation about his future, it was announced that Reynolds had turned his back on a one-year Souths contract extension to sign a three-year deal with Brisbane starting in 2022, for reportedly $200,000 less than he would've earned if he had signed with Cronulla-Sutherland.

In round 16, Reynolds broke Eric Simms record at South Sydney for most goals kicked in the club's 38–22 victory over Wests Tigers.

In round 20, Reynolds scored a try, provided two try assists and kicked seven goals as South Sydney defeated St. George Illawarra 50–14.

The following week, Reynolds became South Sydney's all-time record points scorer overtaking Eric Simms as Souths defeated Parramatta 40–12.

Reynolds played a total of 25 games for South Sydney in the 2021 NRL season. He captained Souths in their 14–12 2021 NRL Grand Final loss against Penrith. With only five minutes remaining, Reynolds had a conversion attempt from the sideline which would have levelled the scores at 14–14. Reynolds narrowly missed the conversion with the ball going to the right of the posts. Reynolds then attempted a two-point field goal with one minute remaining but the ball fell short of the crossbar and Penrith held on to claim their third premiership.

=== 2022 ===
On 31 January, Reynolds was announced as the captain of his new team the Brisbane Broncos, becoming the 12th full-time Broncos men's captain of all time. In Round 2 of the 2022 NRL season, Reynolds made his club debut for Brisbane in a 16–10 victory over Canterbury at Stadium Australia. In Round 9 of the 2022 NRL season, Reynolds played against his former club for the first time and led Brisbane to a 32–12 victory over South Sydney at Stadium Australia. Reynolds scored a try and kicked six goals during the match. Reynolds played a total of 20 games for Brisbane throughout the year as the club finished 9th on the table. Reynolds finished as Brisbane's top point scorer for the season with 146 points.

=== 2023 ===
In round 1 of the 2023 NRL season, Reynolds kicked a field goal for Brisbane which proved to be the difference as they pulled off a massive upset defeating back to back premiers Penrith at Penrith Stadium 13–12. In round 11, Reynolds was medicabbed off the field in the opening 20 minutes of Brisbane's match against Melbourne after he hit his head on the ground which knocked him unconscious. In round 24, Reynolds became the second player in Australian rugby league history to kick 1000 goals during Brisbane's 54–10 victory over Parramatta at The Gabba. Reynolds played a total of 23 matches for Brisbane in the 2023 NRL season. Reynolds played in Brisbane's 26–24 loss against Penrith in the 2023 NRL Grand Final where he made a couple of key errors during the game including kicking the ball out on the full from a dropout on two occasions.

=== 2024 ===
Ahead of Brisbane's round 3 grand final rematch against Penrith, Reynolds was ruled out for an indefinite period with a knee injury. In round 5 against Melbourne, Reynolds was taken from the field with what was initially thought to be a knee injury however it later was revealed to be a minor hamstring complaint. Reynolds was seen on dressing room cameras openly crying with coaching staff. In round 9, Reynolds was taken from the field during Brisbane's 40-18 loss against the Sydney Roosters. It was later revealed that Reynolds had suffered a torn bicep and would be ruled out for at least 3–4 months.

=== 2025 ===
In round 9 of the 2025 NRL season, Reynolds became the second highest point scorer in NSWRL/NRL history during Brisbane's match against Penrith. In round 14, Reynolds played his 300th first grade game in Brisbane's 44-14 victory over the Gold Coast Titans. On 19 June, the Brisbane outfit announced that Reynolds had re-signed with the club for a further 12 months. In Round 23, Reynolds suffered a hamstring injury ruling him out for 3-4 weeks. In Brisbane's preliminary final against four-time reigning premiers Penrith, Reynolds, returning from injury, kicked the decisive goal that saw his team win 16-14 and advance to the 2025 NRL Grand Final.

In the Grand Final, Reynolds, as captain, led Brisbane to win 26-22, defeating Melbourne. Unfortunately, he was unable to finish the game on the field as he was taken off in the 48th minute after injuring his calf. Reynolds could be seen being carried off the sidelines visibly upset, as the Broncos were still down six points and now without their starting half and captain. Fortunately Brisbane won, securing Reynolds’s second NRL premiership and second with coach Michael Maguire.

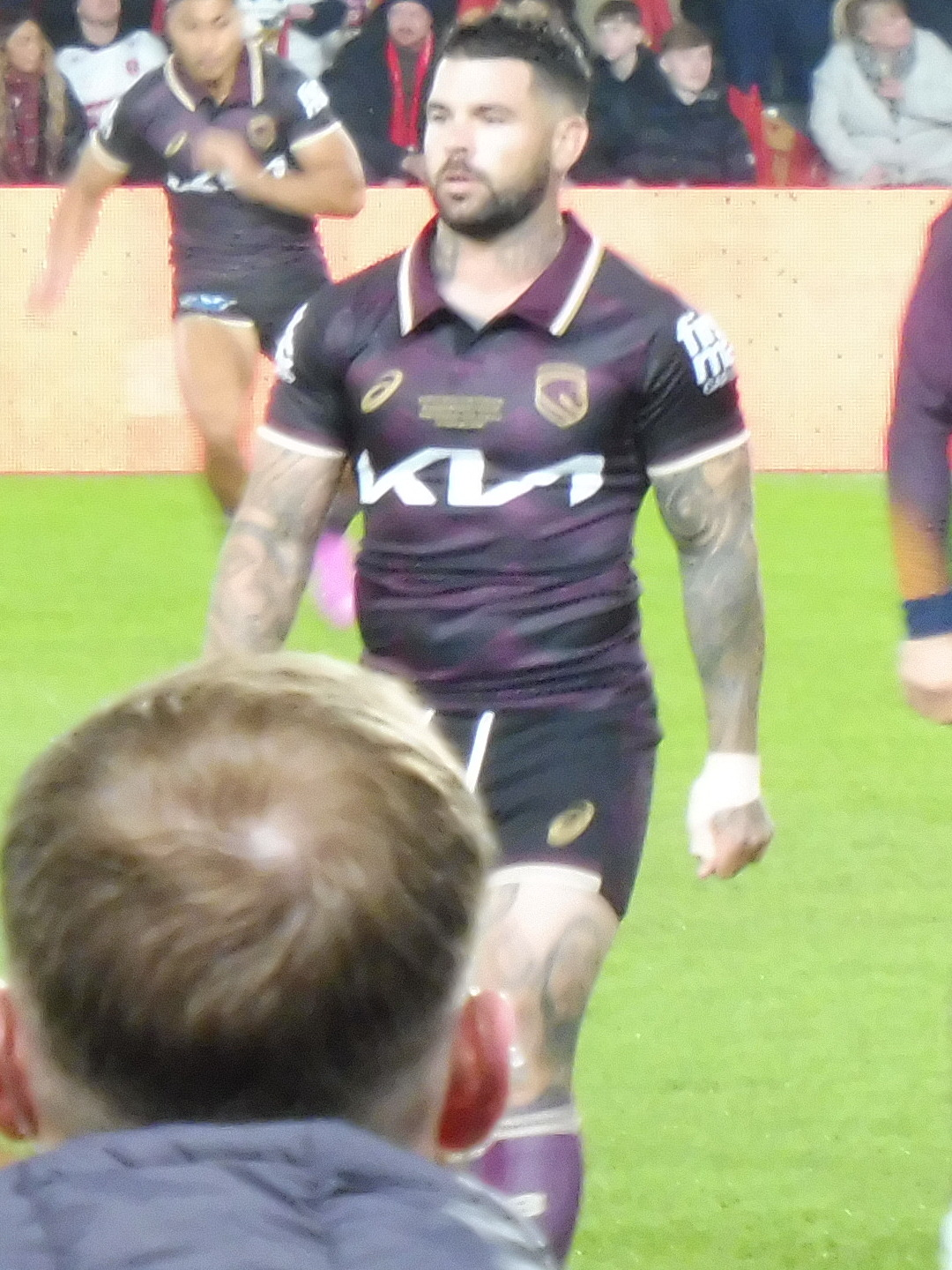
Reynolds warming up at the 2026 World Club Challenge

Questions were raised about Reynolds's longevity and health following the grand final, as he suffered yet another leg injury from what was seemingly a harmless run.

=== 2026 ===
On 9 February 2026, Reynolds confirmed that the 2026 season would be his last in the NRL confirming he would be retiring at the end of the season.

On 19 February, Reynolds played in Brisbane's World Club Challenge loss against Hull Kingston Rovers.

On 24 August 2026, Reynolds confirmed his career was over as he was ruled out of Brisbane's final two games due to ongoing nerve issues with his calves.

== Statistics ==
=== Club ===
†	Denotes seasons in which Reynolds won an NRL Premiership

Season	Team	Matches	T	G	GK%	F/G	Pts
2012	South Sydney	27	3	97	85.09%	2	208
2013	South Sydney	26	4	100	90.09%	2	218
2014†	South Sydney	26	7	95	79.17%	3	221
2015	South Sydney	18	1	53	81.54%	1	111
2016	South Sydney	16	2	43	75.44%	1	95
2017	South Sydney	21	2	67	88.16%	2	144
2018	South Sydney	24	5	93	75.00%	5	211
2019	South Sydney	25	3	96	82.76%	3	207
2020	South Sydney	23	6	98	85.22%	1	221
2021	South Sydney	25	5	118	79.19%	2 (Note: Includes 2 two-point field goals.)	260
2022	Brisbane	20	6	61	84.72%	0	146
2023	Brisbane	23	5	94	81.74%	3 (Note: Includes 1 two-point field goal.)	212
2024	Brisbane	13	1	43	86.00%	0	90
2025†	Brisbane	22	4	81	84.38%	1 (Note: Includes 1 two-point field goal.)	180
2026	Brisbane	14	3	30	(Rd 12)	2	74
Career totals		323	57	1169		28	2598

=== Honours ===
Individual

- RLPA Rookie Of The Year: 2012
- Dally M Rookie Of The Year: 2012
- South Sydney Rabbitohs Rookie Of The Year: 2012
- South Sydney Rabbitohs Appreciation Award: 2012
- South Sydney Rabbitohs Members Choice Award: 2012, 2020
- NRL Top Point Scorer: 2020
- Brisbane Broncos Clubperson Of The Year: 2022
- Brisbane Broncos Best Back: 2022
- Dally M Captain Of The Year: 2023
- NRL Premiership Captain: 2025

Club

- NRL Grand Finalist: 2014, 2021, 2023, 2025
- NRL Premiership Winner: 2014, 2025
- World Club Challenge Winner: 2015
- NRL Nines Winner: 2015
- NRL Pre-Season Challenge Winner: 2024, 2025

Representative

- City vs Country Origin Test Champion: 2012
- PM's XIII Test Champion: 2015
- All Stars Test Champion: 2016
