= List of players with 1,000 NRL points =

As of 27 September 2026, there have been 61 players who have scored 1,000 or more points in the National Rugby League and its predecessors, the NSWRL, ARL and Super League premierships. Players still currently active are listed in bold.

Ranking	Points	No.	Reached In	Player	Club/Clubs	Career span	Matches	Average PPG
1	2,786	41	2010	Cameron Smith	Melbourne Storm	2002–2020	430	6.48
2	2,598	51	2018	Adam Reynolds	South Sydney Rabbitohs, Brisbane Broncos	2012–2026	323	8.04
3	2,418	32	2003	Hazem El Masri	Canterbury-Bankstown Bulldogs	1996–2009	317	7.63
4	2,374	50	2015	Jarrod Croker	Canberra Raiders	2009–2023	307	7.73
5	2,222	42	2011	Johnathan Thurston	Canterbury-Bankstown Bulldogs, North Queensland Cowboys	2002–2018	323	6.88
6	2,176	26	2000	Andrew Johns	Newcastle Knights	1993–2007	249	8.74
7	2,107	21	1996	Jason Taylor	Western Suburbs Magpies, North Sydney Bears, Northern Eagles, Parramatta Eels	1990–2001	276	7.63
8	2,034	20	1995	Daryl Halligan	North Sydney Bears, Canterbury-Bankstown Bulldogs	1991–2000	230	8.84
9	1,971	11	1981	Mick Cronin	Parramatta Eels	1977–1986	216	9.13
10	1,941	54	2021	**Nathan Cleary**	Penrith Panthers	2016–	217	8.94
11	1,917	10	1977	Graham Eadie	Manly Warringah Sea Eagles	1971–1983	237	8.09
12	1,841	8	1970	Eric Simms	South Sydney	1965–1975	206	8.94
13	1,825	49	2014	James Maloney	Melbourne Storm, New Zealand Warriors, Sydney Roosters, Cronulla-Sutherland Sharks, Penrith Panthers	2009–2019	249	7.33
14	1,793	38	2008	Luke Burt	Parramatta Eels	1999–2012	264	6.79
15	1,730	48	2014	Michael Gordon	Penrith Panthers, Cronulla-Sutherland Sharks, Parramatta Eels, Sydney Roosters, Gold Coast Titans	2006–2019	261	6.63
16	1,690	25	1999	Ryan Girdler	Illawarra Steelers, Penrith Panthers	1991–2004	227	7.44
17	1,627	59	2024	**Jamayne Isaako**	Brisbane Broncos, Gold Coast Titans, Dolphins, **Melbourne Storm**	2017–	186	8.75
=18	1,604	31	2003	Clinton Schifcofske	South Queensland Crushers, Parramatta Eels, Canberra Raiders	1996–2006	234	6.85
=18	1,604	34	2005	Craig Fitzgibbon	Illawarra Steelers, St. George Illawarra Dragons, Sydney Roosters	1998–2009	264	6.08
=20	1,554	9	1971	Graeme Langlands	St. George	1963–1976	227	6.85
=20	1,554	45	2013	Jamie Lyon	Parramatta Eels, Manly Warringah Sea Eagles	2000–2004, 2007–2016	294	5.29
22	1,519	5	1963	Keith Barnes	Balmain	1955–1968	194	7.83
23	1,502	57	2024	**Valentine Holmes**	Cronulla-Sutherland Sharks, North Queensland Cowboys, **St. George Illawarra Dragons**	2014–2018, 2020–	241	6.23
24	1,500	37	2006	Matt Orford	Northern Eagles, Melbourne Storm, Manly Warringah Sea Eagles, Canberra Raiders	2000–2009, 2011	235	6.38
25	1,476	52	2019	Shaun Johnson	New Zealand Warriors, Cronulla-Sutherland Sharks	2011–2024	268	5.51
26	1,451	55	2022	**Mitchell Moses**	Wests Tigers, **Parramatta Eels**	2014–	257	5.65
27	1,442	18	1989	Terry Lamb	Western Suburbs Magpies, Canterbury-Bankstown Bulldogs	1980–1996	350	4.12
28	1,434	58	2024	**Reuben Garrick**	Manly Warringah Sea Eagles, **Sydney Roosters**	2019–	180	7.97
29	1,388	14	1983	Steve Gearin	Canterbury-Bankstown Bulldogs, St. George Dragons, Manly Warringah Sea Eagles	1976–1986	177	7.84
30	1,376	12	1981	Steve Rogers	Cronulla-Sutherland Sharks, St. George Dragons	1973–1985	231	5.96
31	1,365	56	2023	**Latrell Mitchell**	Sydney Roosters, **South Sydney Rabbitohs**	2016–	193	7.07
32	1,363	30	2001	Ivan Cleary	Manly Warringah Sea Eagles, North Sydney Bears, Sydney City Roosters, New Zealand Warriors	1992–2002	186	7.33
33	1,360	29	2000	Mat Rogers	Cronulla-Sutherland Sharks, Gold Coast Titans	1995–2001, 2007–2011	200	6.80
34	1,331	22	1996	Matthew Ridge	Manly Warringah Sea Eagles, Auckland Warriors	1990–1999	159	8.37
35	1,328	40	2009	Corey Parker	Brisbane Broncos	2001–2016	347	3.83
36	1,296	16	1985	John Dorahy	Western Suburbs Magpies, Manly Warringah Sea Eagles, Illawarra Steelers, North Sydney Bears	1974–1989	239	5.42
37	1,289	35	2005	Brett Hodgson	Western Suburbs Magpies, Parramatta Eels, Wests Tigers	1997–2008	225	5.73
38	1,288	4	1960	Ron Willey	Canterbury-Bankstown, Manly-Warringah, Parramatta	1948–1953, 1956–1964	201	6.41
39	1,280	47	2013	Jamie Soward	Sydney Roosters, St. George Illawarra Dragons, Penrith Panthers	2005–2016	216	5.93
40	1,278	15	1984	Ron Giteau	Western Suburbs Magpies, Eastern Suburbs Roosters, Canberra Raiders	1974–1986	226	5.65
41	1,261	13	1982	Ken Wilson	Newtown Jets, Penrith Panthers	1971–1983	194	6.50
42	1,232	44	2012	Benji Marshall	Wests Tigers, St. George Illawarra Dragons, Brisbane Broncos, South Sydney Rabbitohs	2003–2021	346	3.56
43	1,228	43	2012	Kurt Gidley	Newcastle Knights	2001–2015	251	4.89
44	1,218	24	1998	David Furner	Canberra Raiders	1992–2000	200	6.09
45	1,196	28	2000	Julian O'Neill	Brisbane Broncos, Western Reds, South Sydney Rabbitohs, North Queensland Cowboys	1991–2001	232	5.16
46	1,191	36	2006	Darren Lockyer	Brisbane Broncos	1995–2011	355	3.35
47	1,180	17	1987	Ross Conlon	Western Suburbs Magpies, Canterbury-Bankstown Bulldogs, Balmain Tigers	1981–1988	170	6.94
48	1,160	19	1994	Greg Alexander	Penrith Panthers, Auckland Warriors	1984–1999	265	4.38
49	1,158	27	2000	Wayne Bartrim	Gold Coast Seagulls, St. George Dragons, St. George Illawarra Dragons	1991–2001	231	5.01
=50	1,154	2	1959	Bernie Purcell	Western Suburbs, South Sydney	1948–1960	185	6.24
=50	1,154	7	1970	Bob Batty	Manly-Warringah	1959–1971	205	5.63
52	1,122	61	2026	**Nicholas Hynes**	Melbourne Storm, **Cronulla-Sutherland Sharks**	2019–	148	7.58
53	1,102	60	2026	**Nick Meaney**	Newcastle Knights, Canterbury-Bankstown Bulldogs, Melbourne Storm, **Perth Bears**	2018–	179	6.15
54	1,092	23	1998	Rod Wishart	Illawarra Steelers, St. George Illawarra Dragons	1989–1999	177	6.17
55	1,090	39	2009	Luke Covell	Wests Tigers, Cronulla-Sutherland Sharks	2003–2010	153	7.12
56	1,062	33	2004	Michael De Vere	Brisbane Broncos	1997–2004, 2009	161	6.60
57	1,057	6	1970	Bob Landers	Eastern Suburbs, Penrith	1959–1970	176	6.01
58	1,054	46	2013	Scott Prince	North Queensland Cowboys, Brisbane Broncos, Wests Tigers, Gold Coast Titans	1998–2013	300	3.51
59	1,045	3	1960	Darcy Russell	Eastern Suburbs, Western Suburbs	1948–1951, 1957–1960	125	8.36
60	1,042	1	1947	Tom Kirk	Canterbury-Bankstown, Newtown, North Sydney	1936–1947	153	6.81
61	1,003	53	2019	Gareth Widdop	Melbourne Storm, St. George Illawarra Dragons	2010–2019	195	5.14
Source: Rugby League Point Scorers (1908–2025)

== See also ==
- List of National Rugby League players with five tries in a game
- List of players who have played 300 NRL games
- List of players with 20 NRL field goals
- List of players with 100 NRL tries
- List of players with 100 NRL tries and 500 NRL goals
- List of players with 500 NRL goals
