= Luke Burt =

Australian rugby league coach and former player

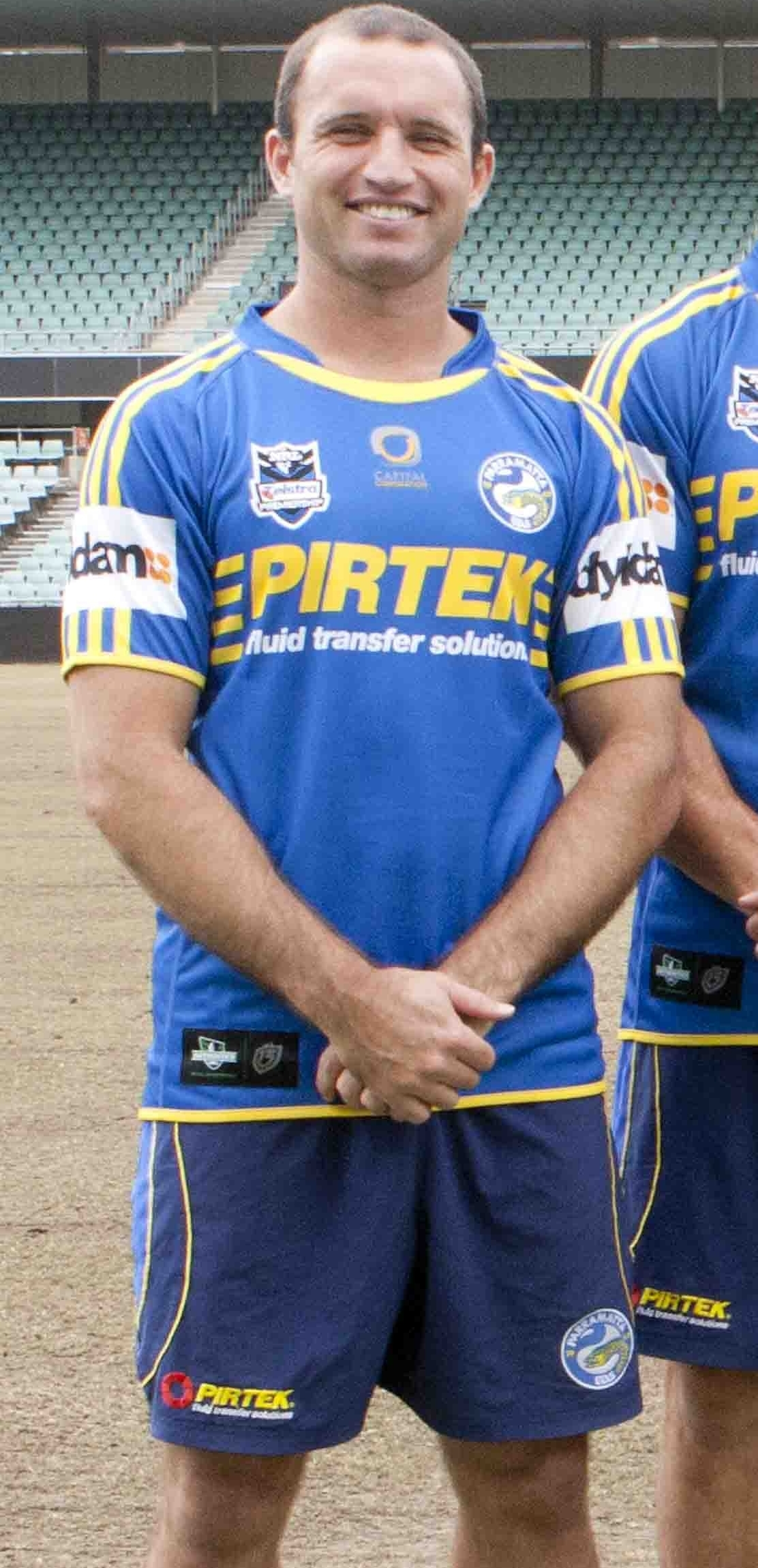

Personal information
- Full name: Luke Kevin Burt
- Born: 6 June 1981 (age 45) Newcastle, New South Wales, Australia
- Height: 178 cm (5 ft 10 in)
- Weight: 88 kg (13 st 12 lb)

Playing information
- Position: Wing, Fullback, Centre
Club
Years	Team	Pld	T	G	FG	P
1999–2012	Parramatta Eels	264	124	646	5	1793
Representative
Years	Team	Pld	T	G	FG	P
2010	NSW Country	1	1	6	0	16
2011	Prime Minister's XIII	1	1	3	0	10

Coaching information
Club
Years	Team	Gms	W	D	L	W%
2019	Gold Coast Titans	8	0	0	8	0
2023–	Burleigh Bears	86	56	5	25	65
	Total	94	56	5	33	60
- Source: As of 5 December 2023

Luke Kevin Burt (born 6 June 1981) is a professional rugby league coach who is the head coach of the Burleigh Bears in the Queensland Cup, and an Australian former professional rugby league footballer. He has signed on to be an inaugural assistant coach of the Papua New Guinea Chiefs ahead of their inception into the NRL in 2028.

He was the assistant coach at the Titans under previous head coach Garth Brennan. He previously coached the Parramatta Eels in the National Youth Competition. A goal-kicking winger and occasional fullback, he played his entire career for the Parramatta Eels in the National Rugby League. Burt also gained selection for Country New South Wales and the Prime Minister's XIII.

== Early life ==
Burt was born in Newcastle, New South Wales, Australia. He attended Whitebridge High School and played for the Australian Schoolboys team in 1998.

Burt went on to play junior football for the Valentine Red Devils before being called up to the Eels in 1999.

== NRL career ==
Burt made his first-grade debut in Round 1, 1999, at the age of 17 against the St. George Illawarra Dragons. He was named the 1999 Parramatta Eels season's rookie of the year. Burt played on the wing in Parramatta's 18-16 preliminary final loss against Melbourne during the same season.

In the 2000 NRL season, Parramatta again made the preliminary final but were defeated by eventual premiers the Brisbane Broncos 16–10 with Burt scoring a try during the game.

Although a very capable fullback, Burt played most of his football as a wing or centre since the Eels backs of the era included Clinton Schifcofske, Brett Hodgson, Wade McKinnon and Jarryd Hayne, all of whom have earned at least one representative jumper at fullback. As an outside back, he provided many tries down either the left or right flank for Parramatta. Burt played on the wing for Parramatta in their shock 2001 NRL grand final loss to the Newcastle Knights at Stadium Australia.

In the 2005 NRL season, Burt played 23 games as Parramatta won the minor premiership and Burt's second at the club with the first coming in the 2001 NRL season. Burt played in Parramatta's shock 29-0 preliminary final defeat against North Queensland at Telstra Stadium.

With the departure of McKinnon at the end of 2006 to the New Zealand Warriors, Burt was installed as the regular fullback. In 2007 Burt continued his great form at fullback and was particularly impressive with his goalkicking, kicking at just under 90% success rates for the season. His form put him at the top of the NRL's point scoring list for much of the 2007 NRL season. Unfortunately Burt dislocated his kneecap against the Newcastle Knights in Round 17 and missed the remainder of the NRL season. At the time of his injury, Burt was so far ahead on the point scoring list that it took Hazem El Masri (second highest point scorer after Burt) until Round 22 to catch his total of 154 points for the season.

In the middle of the 2009 season, Burt moved to the wing to let Jarryd Hayne move to his preferred fullback position. This move proved to be a masterstroke as Jarryd Hayne collected a number of awards including Dally M player of the year and fullback of the year and lead Parramatta to a Grand Final against the Melbourne Storm. Burt was unsuccessful in his second Grand Final appearance going down to Melbourne. Burt, Nathan Cayless and Nathan Hindmarsh were the only players to have played a Grand Final for Parramatta in the 2009 team.

In round 4 of the 2011 season against the North Queensland Cowboys, Burt broke Brett Kenny's record of most tries for Parramatta with 111.

In 2011, Burt was moved back to fullback due to Jarryd Hayne going into the position of 5/8. With South Sydney halfback Chris Sandow joining the Eels in 2012, Eels coach Stephen Kearney announced his intention to move Hayne back to his preferred fullback spot with Burt moving back onto the wing.

Burt was an unceremonious 11th hour demotion to the NSW Cup for the Round 2 match of 2012 against the New Zealand Warriors. Burt announced that he would retire at the end of the 2012 NRL season and join the Eel's coaching staff in 2013. Burt's final game as a player came in round 26 2012 against St. George Illawarra at Telstra Stadium which ended in a 29–8 loss.

== Coaching career ==
In 2017, Burt coached the Parramatta National Youth Competition side to fourth place on the table. After defeating Cronulla and Penrith, Burt guided Parramatta to the final ever Under 20's grand final against Manly. Parramatta went on to lose the match 20–18 with Manly scoring in the final minute of the game to win. In November 2017, Burt joined The Gold Coast Titans to become assistant coach alongside Garth Brennan. On 15 July 2019, Burt was named as interim coach until the end of the 2019 NRL season along with Craig Hodges after Gold Coast head coach Garth Brennan was terminated by the club after a 24–2 loss against Penrith which left the Gold Coast sitting bottom of the ladder.

In Round 20 of the 2019 NRL season, the Gold Coast suffered their second heaviest defeat as a club losing 58–6 to the Sydney Roosters at the Sydney Cricket Ground. Burt's interim coaching partner Craig Hodges described the loss by saying "The fear is that it is the habit they allow...that becomes acceptable for them individually whether they stay here or whether they move on to other places, And if that's what they take out of this season, if that's their legacy moving forward from this season, I think that's a terrible tragedy".

In Round 22 of the 2019 NRL season against Burt's former club the Parramatta Eels, the Gold Coast lost the match 36–12 at Cbus Super Stadium which all but confirmed that the club would finish last and claim the wooden spoon with just 3 games remaining. The Gold Coast were officially handed the wooden spoon the following week as they lost 24–8 against Melbourne at AAMI Park. The wooden spoon capped off a bad year for sport on the Gold Coast as the other team representing the region, the Gold Coast Suns finished last in the AFL.

On 24 May 2026, the PNG Chiefs announced Burt as the club's assistant coach from 2028.

== Records and accomplishments ==
In a game against Canberra in the 2005 NRL season, Burt scored 28 points (3 tries and 8 goals). That point total matched his previous best and tied the club record for most points in a match.

Debuting at the age of 17 years and 9 months, Burt became the youngest player to play first-grade for the Eels.

In Round 22 of the 2009 NRL season Burt scored a 24-point haul which helped the Parramatta Eels secure their fourth straight victory, defeating the Newcastle Knights 40–8 at Parramatta Stadium in front of a crowd of 17,669. Luke bagged a double including one disallowed try along with scoring 8 goals from 8 attempts which concluded his best performance of the year.

Burt scored his 100th first grade try for the Eels in the 2009 Preliminary Final against the Bulldogs (Only the second ever Parramatta player to do so behind Brett Kenny).

After some great form in early 2010, Burt was selected to play for the Country Origin side where he scored a try and kicked 6 goals from 6 attempts. In the same season, he became the third player to score 100 tries and 500 goals (after Ryan Girdler and Hazem El Masri)

In 2011, playing against the Cowboys at Parramatta Stadium, Burt equalled then passed Brett Kenny's all time try scoring record for Parramatta (110) with 2 tries, the second try coming with 2 minutes remaining on the clock set up a kick from the touchline to win the match. Burt converted his record-breaking try to win the match.

Burt's 1,793 points is the 14th most in first grade history, and the second most for Parramatta behind Mick Cronin.
