= Nathan Merritt =

Australian rugby league footballer (born 1983)

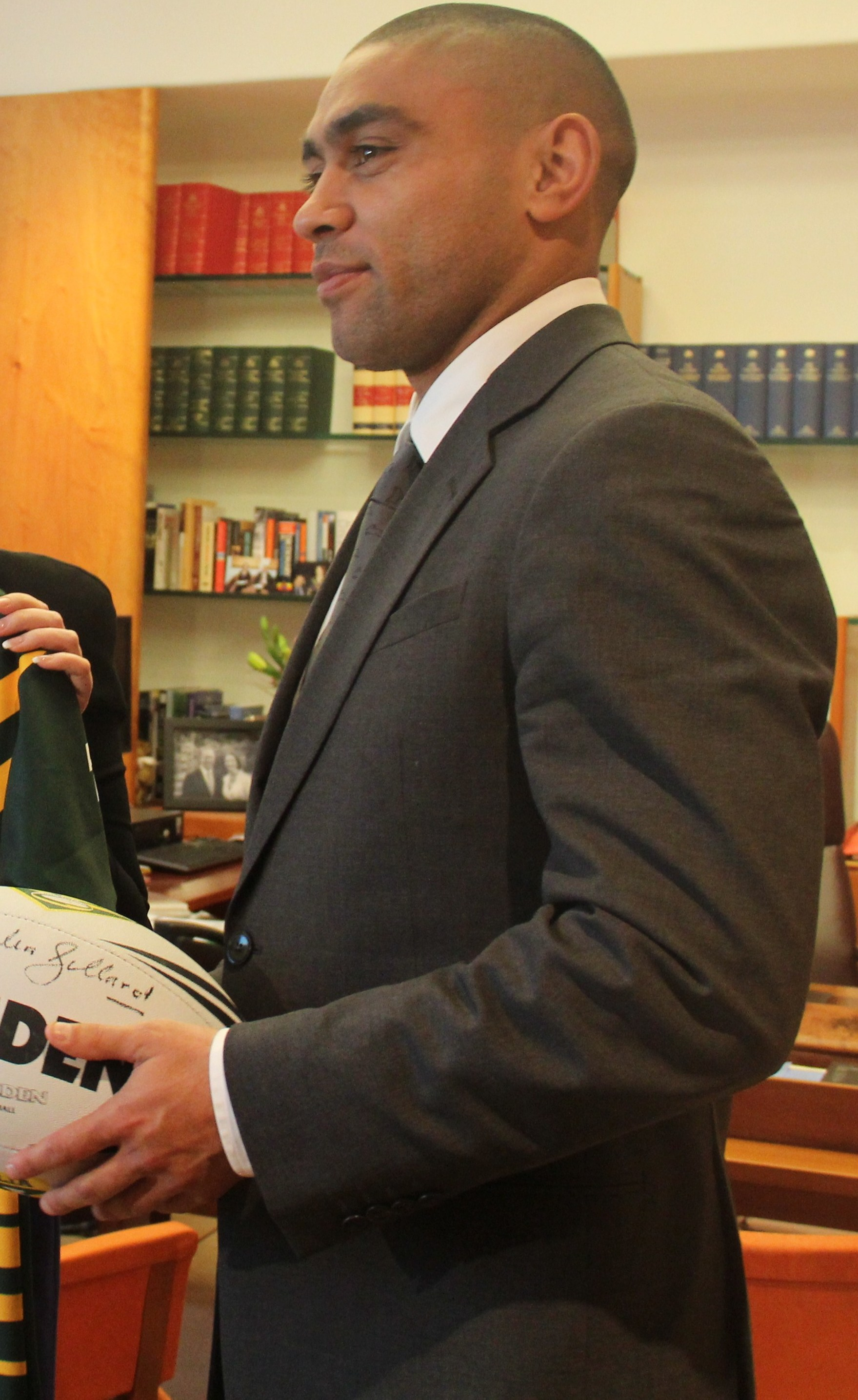

Personal information
- Full name: Nathan Deane Merritt
- Born: 26 May 1983 (age 43) Sydney, New South Wales, Australia

Playing information
- Height: 181 cm (5 ft 11 in)
- Weight: 90 kg (14 st 2 lb)
- Position: Wing, Fullback
Club
Years	Team	Pld	T	G	FG	P
2002–03	South Sydney	23	12	1	0	50
2004–05	Cronulla Sharks	19	8	6	0	44
2006–14	South Sydney	195	134	33	1	603
	Total	237	154	40	1	697
Representative
Years	Team	Pld	T	G	FG	P
2005	NSW Residents	1	0	2	0	4
2006–11	Prime Minister's XIII	2	2	1	0	10
2010–12	Indigenous All Stars	3	3	0	0	12
2011–13	City NSW	2	0	0	0	0
2013	New South Wales	1	0	0	0	0

Nathan Merritt (born 26 May 1983) is an Australian former professional rugby league footballer who played in the 2000s and 2010s. A New South Wales State of Origin representative winger, he played in the National Rugby League for the South Sydney Rabbitohs, with whom he won the 2014 NRL Premiership, and the Cronulla-Sutherland Sharks. Merritt has also played representative football for the City New South Wales, Indigenous All Stars and Prime Minister's XIII sides. A prolific try-scorer, he was the NRL's top try-scorer in 2006 and 2011, and in 2013 became the 9th player in the history of the League to score 150 tries.

== Background ==
Born in Sydney, Merritt is an Indigenous Australian who grew up on The Block in Redfern, South Sydney. He played his early football in the South Sydney Juniors competition for the Alexandria Rovers.

== Professional playing career ==
=== 2000s ===
His first-grade debut was for the South Sydney Rabbitohs against the New Zealand Warriors at Ericsson Stadium in round 9 of the 2002 NRL season, scoring a try on debut. At the end of the 2003 season Merritt agreed to terms with the Cronulla-Sutherland Sharks where he was to play for the next two years. In the 2005 season, Merritt endured a tough year. He played only three first grade games for the Cronulla club, but was a stand-out player in the lower grade NSWRL Premier League matches for Newtown, scoring almost 300 points for the year.

In one game against the Windsor Wolves, he scored 40 points (including five tries). At the end of the season, Merritt picked up a number of awards including Newtown RLFC VB Premier League Players' Player award, as well as having the distinction of being Newtown's highest season point scorer, as well as most points in a game. (as of 2005). His outstanding showing that year was rewarded when his old club South Sydney offered him a two-year contract to play in the NRL.

For the 2006 NRL season, Merritt rejoined the South Sydney club and was a standout performer in an underachieving side all year, being one of only three players to play all 24 games for the club. He was the highest try scorer for the 2006 season with 22 tries, beating Manly-Warringah Sea Eagles' fullback Brett Stewart who scored 20.

It was the first time since Nathan Blacklock in 2000 that the leading try scorer in a season played for a club that missed the finals, and the first time in Australian rugby league history that the leading try scorer in a season played for the club that finished last on the competition ladder. Notably, in the first three rounds of the season Merritt scored a try in the final minute of each game, a feat that had never been achieved in three consecutive games. Merritt's hard work and great performances through the year culminated in the announcement that he had earned his first representative honor, to play for the Prime Minister's XIII on their annual end of season tour to Papua New Guinea, the only South Sydney player to make in the squad. The Australians beat the Papua New Guinea Kumuls 28–8, with Merritt one of the try-scorers. He was also included in the train-on squad for the Kangaroos squad for the 2006 Tri-Nations tournament against England and New Zealand, but missed out on a starting position.

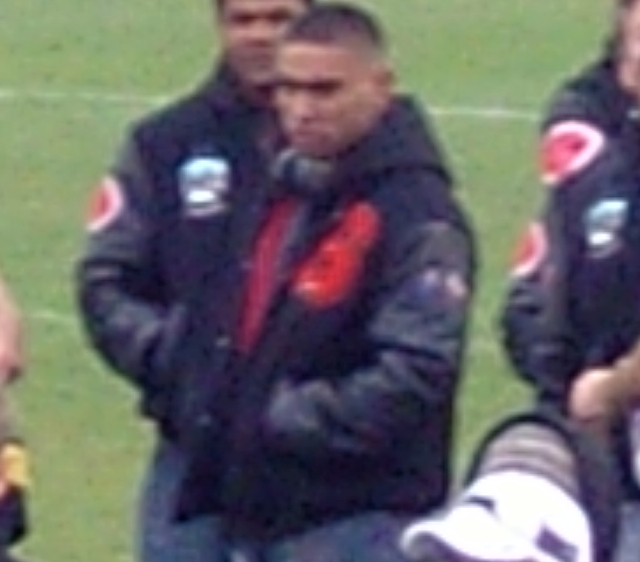
Merritt representing the Rabbitohs in the USA in 2008

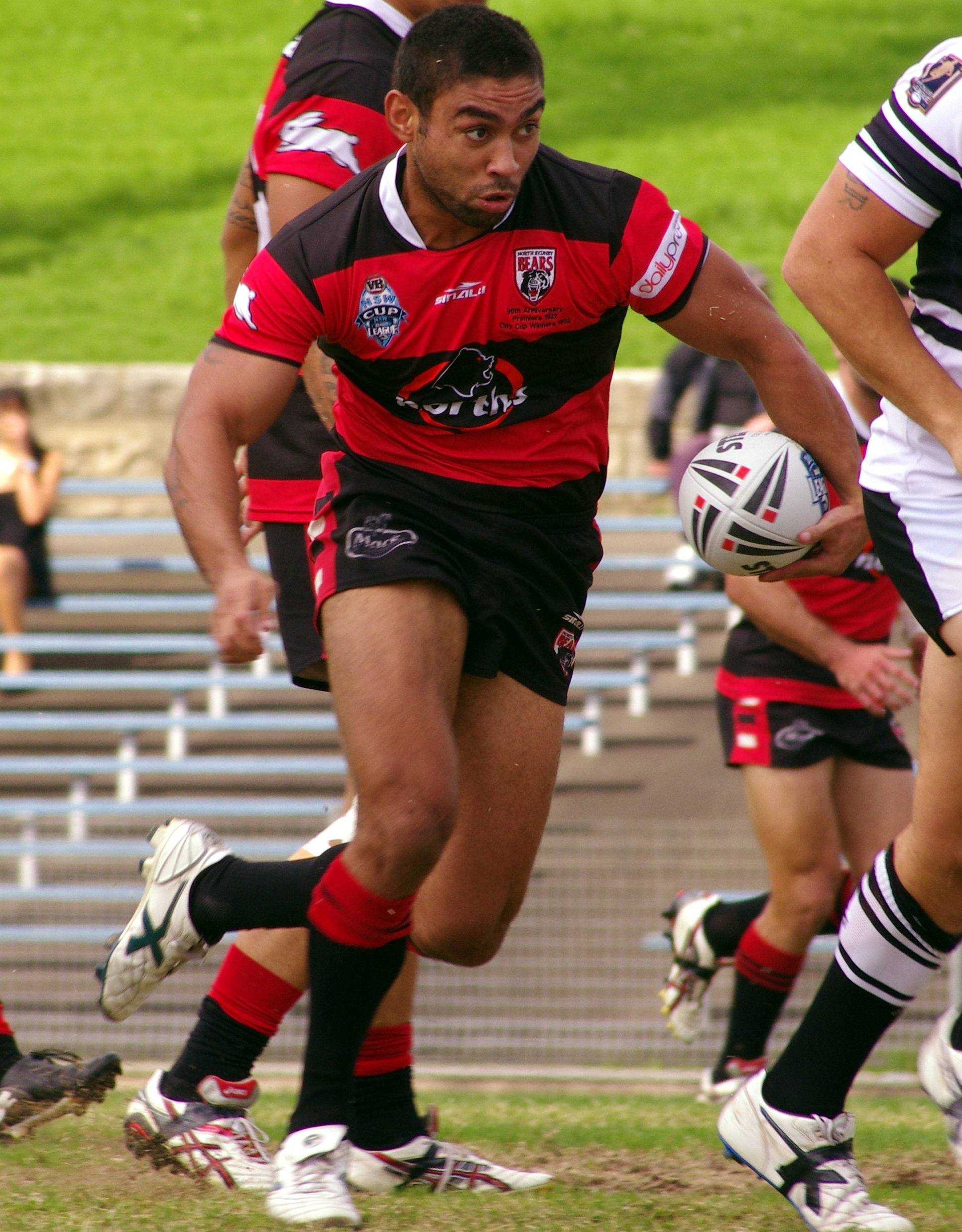
Merrit playing for the North Sydney Bears in 2012

Following the announcement of the City Origin squad in 2007, Merritt hinted that his non-selection was possibly due to "a Souths thing or a racial thing". This comment was lambasted and in rebuttal to this comment critics pointed to the selection of Parramatta's Jarryd Hayne (Fiji) and Canterbury-Bankstown's Hazem El Masri (Lebanon) as evidence that selections had not been racially motivated. The South Sydney club eventually made the finals for the first time since 1989 but Merritt was injured in the second-last round of the competition so was unable to play in the match they ultimately lost to Manly-Warringah.

Merritt scored a hat-trick to begin the 2009 season against the Sydney Roosters in a match Souths won 52–12. In round 10 Merritt was responsible for one of the most iconic moments in modern rugby league. With less than 10 seconds left in the Heritage Round match against the Wests Tigers at the Rugby League's spiritual home of the SCG he kicked a field goal to win the game for South Sydney, 23–22. This was the only field goal he ever kicked in his career. The fact Souths came from 12 points behind late in the game, it was Heritage Round, the game was at the SCG, it was in the final moments in the game and he had never kicked a field goal all contributed to the aura surrounding this moment and the legacy it has produced. At the 2009 Dally M Awards, he was awarded the Peter Frilingos Memorial Award for Headline Moment of the Year for the field goal.

Merritt's great experiences at the Sydney Cricket Ground continued in 2010 when he scored a hat-trick, once again against the Wests Tigers in Heritage Round.

=== 2010s ===
On 8 August 2011 Merritt equalled the South Sydney club record of five tries in a match when he scored five against the Parramatta at ANZ Stadium in a 56–6 win, joining greats such as Harold Horder, Johnny Graves and Ian Moir to have scored five tries in a match for the South Sydney club. He followed this up just six days later with a three try performance against the Canberra Raiders at Canberra Stadium and in doing so he became the first player since former Canberra fullback Brett Mullins in 1994 to score eight tries within eight days in the NRL.

Merritt's haul also saw him become clear leading try scorer for the 2011 NRL season with 21 from 21 games, six tries more than Canterbury's Ben Barba with four rounds left to play before the Finals. After the regular season Merritt finished on 23 tries for the year [equal with Barba], a personal best with his previous best being 22 in 2006. After his brilliant form in 2011, Merritt was again selected to play for the Prime Minister's XIII against Papua New Guinea.

During the 2012 All Stars Match Merritt scored two tries and was awarded the Preston Campbell Medal for Man of the Match. At the end of the 2012 season in which he crossed for 14 tries in 19 games to be South Sydney's second highest try scorer behind rookie winger Andrew Everingham (17 from 25 games).

This ended Merritt's streak of being South Sydney's top try-scorer for the season which extended back to 2006. He finally played in his first finals match, in the first week of the finals against the Melbourne Storm at AAMi Park. Although South Sydney lost, they played in the next week of the finals, however Merritt injured himself in the lead-up to the game and was not able play in South Sydney's first finals victory in 24 years. Merritt was included in the Australian train-on squad for the end of season test against New Zealand in Townsville, but once again he was not one of the 17 selected for the match.

On 18 June 2013, Merritt was selected to make his State of Origin debut for NSW in Game 2 of the 2013 State of Origin series following the suspension of Blake Ferguson. His performance was widely criticised and he was dropped for the following game, never to play for NSW again. South Sydney made the finals for the second consecutive year and Merritt played in their victory against Melbourne, marking the first and only finals win of his career. He scored a try in South Sydney's following game which they lost to Manly, meaning they failed to make the Grand Final.

On 27 September 2013, Merritt equalled Benny Wearing's record for the most number of tries scored (144) by an individual while playing for the South Sydney Rabbitohs, and broke this record with his 145th try, scoring against Penrith at Centrebet Stadium on 11 April 2014.

Merritt was dropped for South Sydney's 2014 ANZAC Day match against Brisbane at Suncorp Stadium. His replacement, Alex Johnston, cemented his spot in South Sydney's team and Merritt only played intermittently for the remainder of the season. On 24 September 2014, Merritt announced his retirement from rugby league. He finished his career as the highest South Sydney try-scorer and the second most games played for the club in a history stretching back to 1908. Despite being part of the 2014 South Sydney squad, he did not attend the Grand Final, which Souths went on to win, instead choosing to play in the annual Koori Knockout.

== Outside rugby league ==
In 2007, Merritt, along with then-Sydney Roosters star Amos Roberts, appeared in the rap music video for Anthony Mundine's "Platinum Ryder" single. US hip-hop artist Snoop Dogg - said to be a Rabbitohs fan - has reportedly named Merritt as his favourite NRL player.

At the press conference announcing his retirement, Merritt announced he was beginning a charity called the Nathan Merritt Foundation aimed at helping youths in Redfern.

On 7 October 2023, Merritt was placed on life support at Royal Prince Alfred Hospital. He made a full recovery.

On 13 March 2026, Merritt revealed that he was diagnosed with both oesophageal and liver cancer with both cancers being stage 4.

== See also ==
- List of players with 100 NRL tries
