= 2022 Brisbane Broncos season =

- NRL rank: 9th
- 2022 record: Wins: 13; losses: 11
- Points scored: For: 514; against: 550

Team information
- CEO: Dave Donaghy
- Coach: Kevin Walters
- Captain: Adam Reynolds
- Stadium: Lang Park - 52,500
- Avg. attendance: 29,594
- High attendance: 42,612

Top scorers
- Tries: Corey Oates (20)
- Goals: Adam Reynolds (61)
- Points: Adam Reynolds (146)
← 2021	List of seasons	2023 →

The 2022 Brisbane Broncos season was the 35th in the club's history. Coached by Kevin Walters and captained by Adam Reynolds, they competed in the NRL's 2022 Telstra Premiership. After spending much of the season in the top 8, the Broncos crumbled, losing five of their last games and finishing the season in 9th position.

== Player movements ==
Gains

- Kurt Capewell from Penrith Panthers
- Ryan James from Canterbury Bankstown Bulldogs
- Corey Jensen from North Queensland Cowboys
- Brenko Lee from Melbourne Storm
- Jordan Pereira from St. George Illawarra Dragons
- Adam Reynolds from South Sydney Rabbitohs
- Billy Walters from Wests Tigers

Losses

- Jesse Arthars to New Zealand Warriors
- John Asiata to Leigh Centurions
- Ethan Bullemor to Manly Warringah Sea Eagles
- Xavier Coates to Melbourne Storm
- Brodie Croft to Salford Red Devils
- Alex Glenn to Retired
- Danny Levi to Huddersfield Giants
- Anthony Milford to Newcastle Knights
- Tevita Pangai Junior to Penrith Panthers
- Isaiah Tass to South Sydney Rabbitohs

== Fixtures ==
=== Pre-season ===
Date	Round	Opponent	Venue	Score	Tries	Goals	Attendance
Saturday, 12 February	Trial 1	Wynnum Manly Seagulls	Kougari Oval	52 – 4	Mariner (3), Pereira (2), Paix, Isaako, Gamble, Mam, Manu	Isaako (5), Gamble	5,000
Saturday, 19 February	Trial 2	Gold Coast Titans	Robina Stadium	26 – 26	Cobbo, Lee, Mam, Paix Staggs	Isaako (3/5)	4,919
Saturday, 26 February	Trial 3	North Queensland Cowboys	Stadium Mackay	6 – 26	Riki	Staggs (1/1)	4,545

=== Regular season ===
Date	Round	Opponent	Venue	Score	Tries	Goals	Attendance
Friday, 11 March	Round 1	South Sydney Rabbitohs	Lang Park	11 – 4	Kelly, Oates	Isaako (2/3)	28,313
Sunday 20 March	Round 2	Canterbury-Bankstown Bulldogs	Stadium Australia	16 – 10	Farnworth (2), Oates	Reynolds (2/3)	13,453
Sunday, 27 March	Round 3	North Queensland Cowboys	Lang Park	12 – 38	Farnworth (2)	Reynolds (2/2)	37,761
Saturday, 2 April	Round 4	New Zealand Warriors	Moreton Daily Stadium	6 – 20	Reynolds	Reynolds (1/1)	9,620
Friday, 8 April	Round 5	Sydney Roosters	Lang Park	20 – 24	Oates (3), Staggs	Reynolds (2/5)	23,508
Friday, 15 April	Round 6	Penrith Panthers	Penrith Stadium	12 – 40	Niu, Staggs	Reynolds (2/2)	19,406
Saturday, 22 April	Round 7	Canterbury-Bankstown Bulldogs	Lang Park	34 – 14	Cobbo (2), Kennedy, Reynolds, Oates, Paix	Reynolds (5/6)	23,243
Saturday, 28 April	Round 8	Cronulla-Sutherland Sharks	Lang Park	16 – 7	Capewell, Farnworth, Staggs	Reynolds (1/2), Staggs (1/1)	16,740
Thursday, 5 May	Round 9	South Sydney Rabbitohs	Lang Park	32 – 12	Cobbo (2), Farnworth, Reynolds, Oates	Reynolds (5/5)	9,242
Friday, 13 May	Round 10	Manly Warringah Sea Eagles	Lang Park	38 – 0	Cobbo (3), Oates (2), Reynolds	Reynolds (7/7)	40,267
Thursday, 19 May	Round 11	Newcastle Knights	Newcastle International Sports Centre	36 – 12	Cobbo (2), Farnworth, Riki, Oates, Walters	Staggs (6/7)	13,312
Friday, 27 May	Round 12	Gold Coast Titans	Lang Park	35 – 24	Capewell, Cobbo, Farnworth, Martin, Riki, Mam	Staggs (5/6)	32,864
	Round 13	Bye					
Saturday, 11 June	Round 14	Canberra Raiders	Lang Park	24 – 18	Farnworth (2), Mam, Pereira	Reynolds (4/5)	28,142
Friday, 17 June	Round 15	Melbourne Storm	Melbourne Rectangular Stadium	20 – 32	Oates (2), Cobbo, Mam	Staggs (2/4)	18,586
Saturday, 2 July	Round 16	North Queensland Cowboys	Willows Sports Complex	26 – 40	Oates (2), Cobbo, Walters	Reynolds (5/5)	23,531
Sunday, 10 July	Round 17	St. George Illawarra Dragons	Lang Park	32 – 18	Hoeter (2), Staggs (2), Mam, Niu	Reynolds (4/6)	29,234
Saturday, 16 July	Round 18	Gold Coast Titans	Robina Stadium	16 – 12	Hoeter, Pereira, Reynolds	Reynolds (2/3)	19,245
Thursday, 21 July	Round 19	Parramatta Eels	Western Sydney Stadium	36 – 14	Oates (2), Capewell, Haas, Riki, Reynolds	Reynolds (6/6)	11,107
Saturday, 30 July	Round 20	Wests Tigers	Lang Park	18 – 32	Mam, Niu, Riki	Reynolds (2/2), Staggs (1/1)	32,909
Thursday, 4 August	Round 21	Sydney Roosters	Sydney Cricket Ground	16 – 34	Oates (2), Capewell	Reynolds (2/3)	10,495
Saturday, 13 August	Round 22	Newcastle Knights	Lang Park	28 – 10	Cobbo (3), Mam, Oates	Reynolds (2/3)	25,742
Friday, 19 August	Round 23	Melbourne Storm	Lang Park	12 – 60	Capewell, Oates	Reynolds (2/2)	42,612
Thursday, 25 August	Round 24	Parramatta Eels	Lang Park	6 – 53	Lee	Staggs (1/1)	30,371
Saturday, 3 September	Round 25	St. George Illawarra Dragons	Jubilee Oval	12 – 22	Hoeter, Walters	Reynolds (2/2)	8,247

=== Ladder ===
As of Round 24

2022 NRL season
Pos	Team	Pld	W	D	L	B	PF	PA	PD	Pts
1	Penrith Panthers (P)	24	20	0	4	1	636	330	+306	42
2	Cronulla-Sutherland Sharks	24	18	0	6	1	573	364	+209	38
3	North Queensland Cowboys	24	17	0	7	1	633	361	+272	36
4	Parramatta Eels	24	16	0	8	1	608	489	+119	34
5	Melbourne Storm	24	15	0	9	1	657	410	+247	32
6	Sydney Roosters	24	15	0	9	1	635	434	+201	32
7	South Sydney Rabbitohs	24	14	0	10	1	604	474	+130	30
8	Canberra Raiders	24	14	0	10	1	524	461	+63	30
9	Brisbane Broncos	24	13	0	11	1	514	550	−36	28
10	St. George Illawarra Dragons	24	12	0	12	1	469	569	−100	26
11	Manly Warringah Sea Eagles	24	9	0	15	1	490	595	−105	20
12	Canterbury-Bankstown Bulldogs	24	7	0	17	1	383	575	−192	16
13	Gold Coast Titans	24	6	0	18	1	455	660	−205	14
14	Newcastle Knights	24	6	0	18	1	372	662	−290	14
15	New Zealand Warriors	24	6	0	18	1	408	700	−292	14
16	Wests Tigers	24	4	0	20	1	352	679	−327	10
