= 2025 NRL Grand Final =

Australian rugby league game

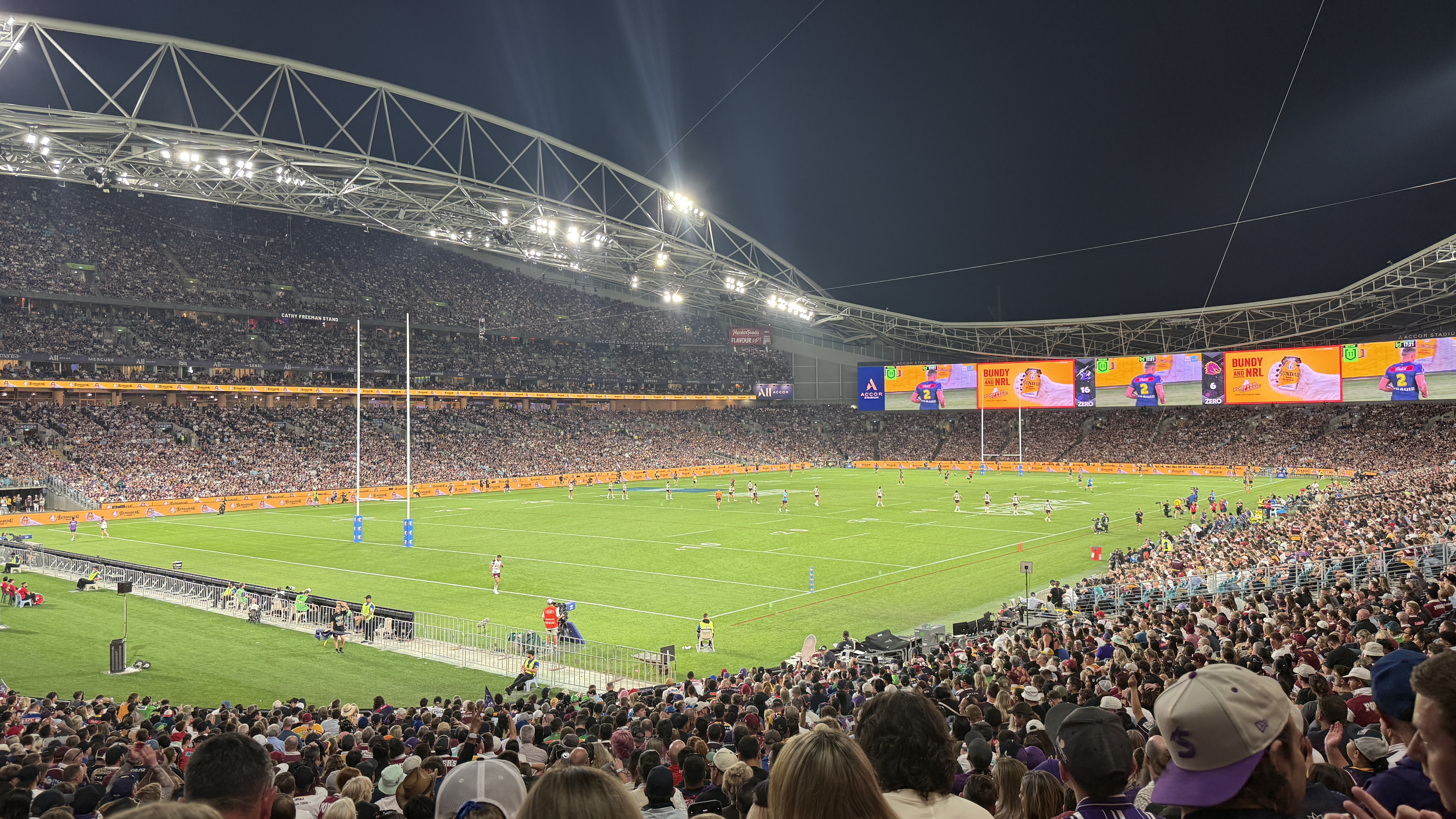
- Accor Stadium hosted the match

| Melbourne Storm | Brisbane Broncos |
|---|---|
| 22 | 26 |
| | 1 | 2 | Total |
|---|---|---|---|
| MEL | 22 | 0 | 22 |
| BRI | 12 | 14 | 26 |
- Date: 5 October 2025
- Stadium: Accor Stadium
- Location: Sydney, New South Wales, Australia
- Clive Churchill Medal: Reece Walsh
- National Anthem: Conrad Sewell
- Pre-Match Entertainment: Teddy Swims
- Referee: Grant Atkins
- Attendance: 80,223

Broadcast partners
- Broadcasters: Nine Network
- Commentators: Mathew Thompson; Billy Slater; Andrew Johns; Brad Fittler; Danika Mason

The 2025 NRL Grand Final was a rugby league game contested between the Melbourne Storm and the Brisbane Broncos on 5 October at Accor Stadium in Sydney, to determine the 2025 NRL premiers. Brisbane defeated Melbourne 26–22 after trailing by ten points at half-time to claim the Provan-Summons Trophy for the first time since 2006, their seventh premiership title overall, and the first team to become premiers from as low as fourth on the ladder since the Wests Tigers in 2005. (Note: Melbourne also won from fourth in 2009, however their premiership title was stripped in 2010.) Brisbane fullback Reece Walsh was awarded the Clive Churchill Medal for player of the match, after scoring a try, making three try-assists, and numerous try-saving defensive plays. His performance has since been considered as one of the greatest in NRL grand final history, and a crucial factor in helping the Broncos' premiership victory.

Brisbane's end-of-season surge to the final contributed to the match's interest, with the team being as low as 11th on the ladder throughout the season, as well as Brisbane halfback Ben Hunt appearing in his first grand final since dropping the kick-off during golden point in the 2015 final, and their fullback Walsh going on a career-defining run of form after a video of him drinking out of a newly-installed toilet went viral on social media. Melbourne became the first club to lose back-to-back grand finals since the Sydney Roosters in 2004, despite finishing second overall during the regular season, while facing injuries and suspensions that kept their team from being consistent throughout the season, but experienced a run of form in the lead-up to the final. Melbourne's significance in the final was encompassed by Craig Bellamy breaking the record for most grand final appearances as a coach, and prop Stefano Utoikamanu calling some Brisbane players "stuck up" in the pre-match press conference. In addition, the match was the first grand final since 2019 to not feature the Penrith Panthers.

The match was preceded by the 2025 NRL State Championship, won by the New Zealand Warriors; and the NRL Women's Premiership grand final, also won by the Brisbane Broncos.

The match was broadcast live throughout Australia by the Nine Network. It became the most-watched grand final in NRL history, with 4.55 million people tuning in for the entire match and was the most-watched program on Australian television in 2025.

== Background ==
=== 2025 season ===
The 2025 NRL season was the 118th season of professional rugby league in Australia and the 28th season run by the National Rugby League. The season consisted of 27 competition rounds, followed by a finals series contested by the top eight teams on the competition ladder.

Brisbane and Melbourne had both been runners-up in the previous two premiership deciders — 2023 and 2024 — losing on each occasion to the Penrith Panthers. Both teams faced each other twice during the regular season: Melbourne won 22–2 at AAMI Park in Round 23, while Brisbane won 30–14 at Suncorp Stadium in Round 27. Their last finals meeting came in the 2023 NRL finals series, where Brisbane won 26–0 in the qualifying final.

Melbourne were aiming for their fifth premiership (Note: Melbourne's premierships in 2007 and 2009 were stripped by the NRL in 2010 due to salary cap breaches), having most recently won in 2020. Brisbane were aiming for their seventh, including their 1997 Super League title, having last won in 2006 — also against Melbourne — by 15–8. This was the second grand final meeting between the two clubs and the fourth time in NRL history that no club from Sydney or New South Wales featured in the decider, after 2006, 2015 and 2017.

=== Melbourne Storm ===
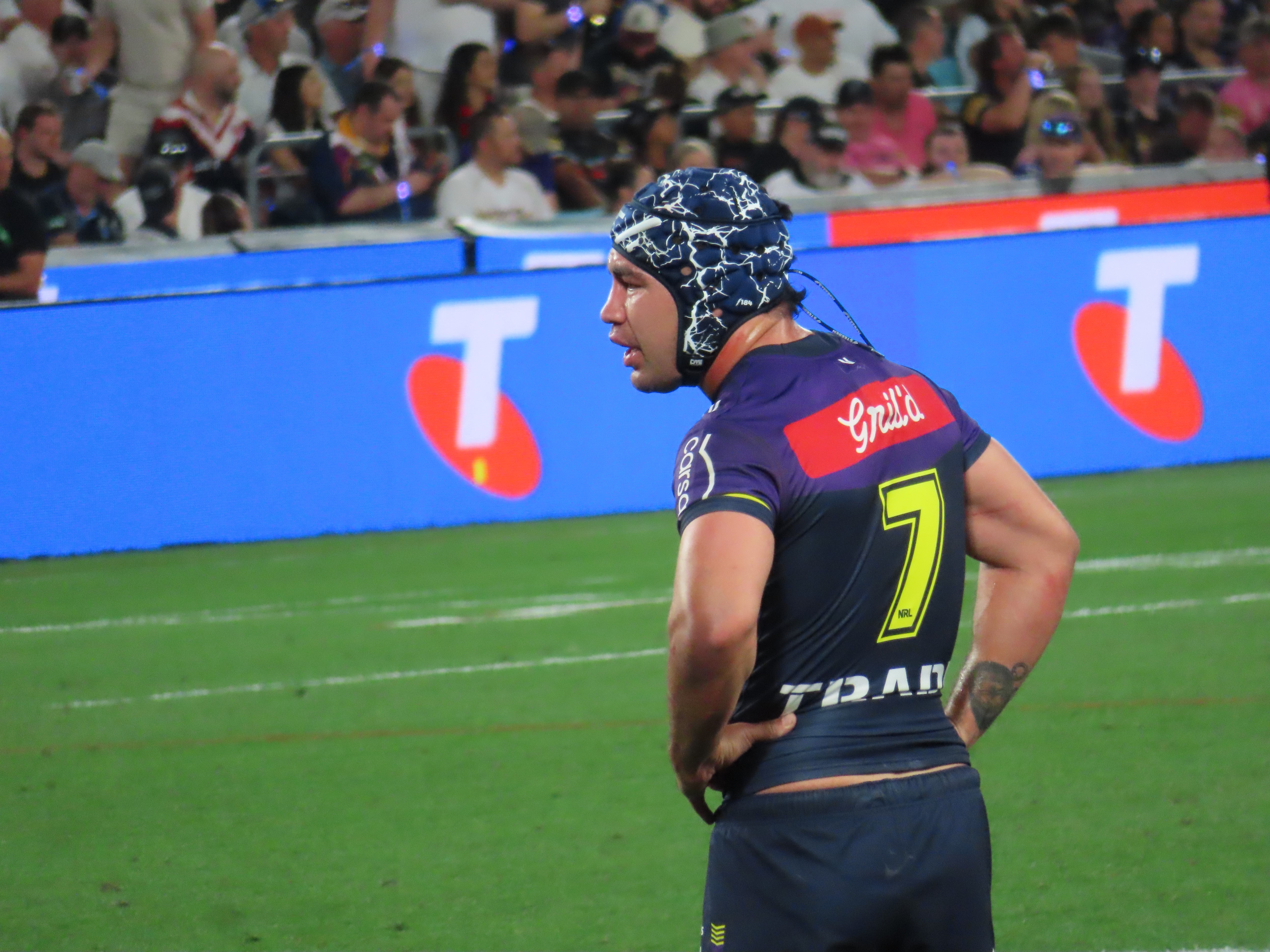
Melbourne Storm halfback and 2024 Dally M Medallist, Jahrome Hughes (pictured in 2024), returned to the club this season, missing most of the final third of the season due to sustaining a shoulder dislocation and a broken arm in separate matches.

==== Regular season ====
After finishing as runners-up in the 2024 NRL season, Melbourne was determined to ensure more power in their team. In the off-season, Melbourne recruited Stefano Utoikamanu from the West Tigers after four seasons with the club, which turned into one of the 'buys of the season'. Melbourne captain, Harry Grant, was excited to play alongside him, revealing later in the season how excited he was to include "firepower" in the team after reaching a grand final. In addition, Melbourne saw the return of many members of the team that were featured in the 2024 final, including 2024 Dally M Player of the Year, Jahrome Hughes. Their long-time coach, Craig Bellamy, would continue with his 23rd season with the club, coaching his 600th game during the season.

The start of the season was already affected by a significant head injury to wing, Will Warbrick, who suffered from severe concussion symptoms after a hit to the head in their match against the St. George Illawarra Dragons in round four, sitting out on doctor's orders until round 25 due to the symptoms persisting and affecting his movement. By halfway through the season, Melbourne sat in fourth with a 7-4 win-loss record, unable to win two consecutive games in six weeks. Their lack of consistency and composure led to making uncharacteristic mistakes, and they were not able to win close games. Despite this, they were still seen as favourites for a top four position at the end of the season.

Injuries and suspensions began to affect their main lineup as the season progressed. Fullback, Ryan Papenhuyzen, developed issues with his calf and was later sidelined due to concussion symptoms. Nelson Asofa-Solomona missed two games due to suspension. Their round 21 match against the Sydney Roosters would prove to be a challenging triumph for the team, with Hughes suffering a dislocated shoulder during their 34-30 victory while attempting to make a tackle, and would be sidelined for the next six weeks. In addition, in a personal circumstance outside of their control, the victory against the Roosters saw five-eighth Cameron Munster miss the same match due to the sudden death of his father in the days before Game 3 of State of Origin.

A showdown with the Brisbane Broncos in round 23 set the team on-track, holding Brisbane try-less in a game for the first time since 2021. The next week saw the club achieve a golden point victory over the Penrith Panthers, the four-time defending premiers, with Grant performing a dummy pass to break Penrith's defensive line and win 22-18. Another tight 20-14 victory against third place, the Canterbury-Bankstown Bulldogs, saw a concussion to Tui Kamikamica as well as their captain, Grant, sent to the sin bin and suspended. Melbourne's ability to close out close was becoming an essential skill as coach Bellamy continued to bemoan the team's inconsistencies. With two close wins in a row on their side, round 26 saw Melbourne have their worst second half performance in the club's history, when after finishing the first half with a 10-0 lead over the Roosters, they conceded 40 points in the second half, to finish the game in a 40-10 loss. This result guaranteeing Canberra would finish as the minor premiers and Melbourne would most likely finish in second. Bellamy once again criticised his team's defence as being "as soft as butter".

In round 27, already guaranteed second place on the regular season table, and second seed in the finals series, Melbourne entered the final game of the regular season against their future grand final opponents —their second meeting in four weeks, treating the match as a final's series practice. Hughes made his return to the side after his shoulder dislocation injury, only to reinjure himself, this time with a broken arm when making a tackle in the 25th minute. In addition, Asofa-Solomona was placed in the sin bin due to a shoulder charge. The team's loss and performance, particularly during the loss to Brisbane, drew ire from Bellamy, who criticised the team's attitude, inconsistency in defence, their discipline leading to unnecessary penalties and questioned whether they were ready for a finals campaign. Ultimately, Melbourne would lose to Brisbane 30-14, although finished the regular season with a 17-7 win-loss record.

==== Finals series ====
Melbourne Storm's route to the final
| Round | Opposition | Score |
|---|---|---|
| QF | Canterbury-Bankstown Bulldogs (H) | 26–18 |
| SF | BYE | |
| PF | Cronulla-Sutherland Sharks (H) | 22–14 |
Key: (H) = Home venue; (A) = Away venue; (N) = Neutral venue

Melbourne entered the finals series as the second seeds, therefore facing third seeds, Canterbury-Bankstown, in the qualifying final. The match ended with a 26-14 win to Melbourne with tries from Eliesa Katoa, Ativalu Lisati, Tyran Wishart and Will Warbrick, in addition to a brief injury scare to Munster and were still missing Hughes. Despite the win, Bellamy had mixed feelings about the team's inconsistent performance throughout the game, praising their defence but criticising their attack. The win also gave Melbourne a bye for the semi-finals and a preliminary final on home soil.

In the preliminary final versus the Cronulla-Sutherland Sharks, Papenhuyzen and Hughes returned, despite Hughes broken-arm not being fully healed. Hughes' defensive performance proving pivotal while also not missing a beat in attack, scoring a try during the match. With the 22-14 win, the victory assured Melbourne a grand final place for the second consecutive year, with their performance as a team clicking into place, their defence proving as their biggest strength and the return of their spine combination of Papenhuyzen, Munster and Hughes making a difference. This grand final appearance would also mark coach Bellamy's 11th grand final appearance as a coach.

=== Brisbane Broncos ===
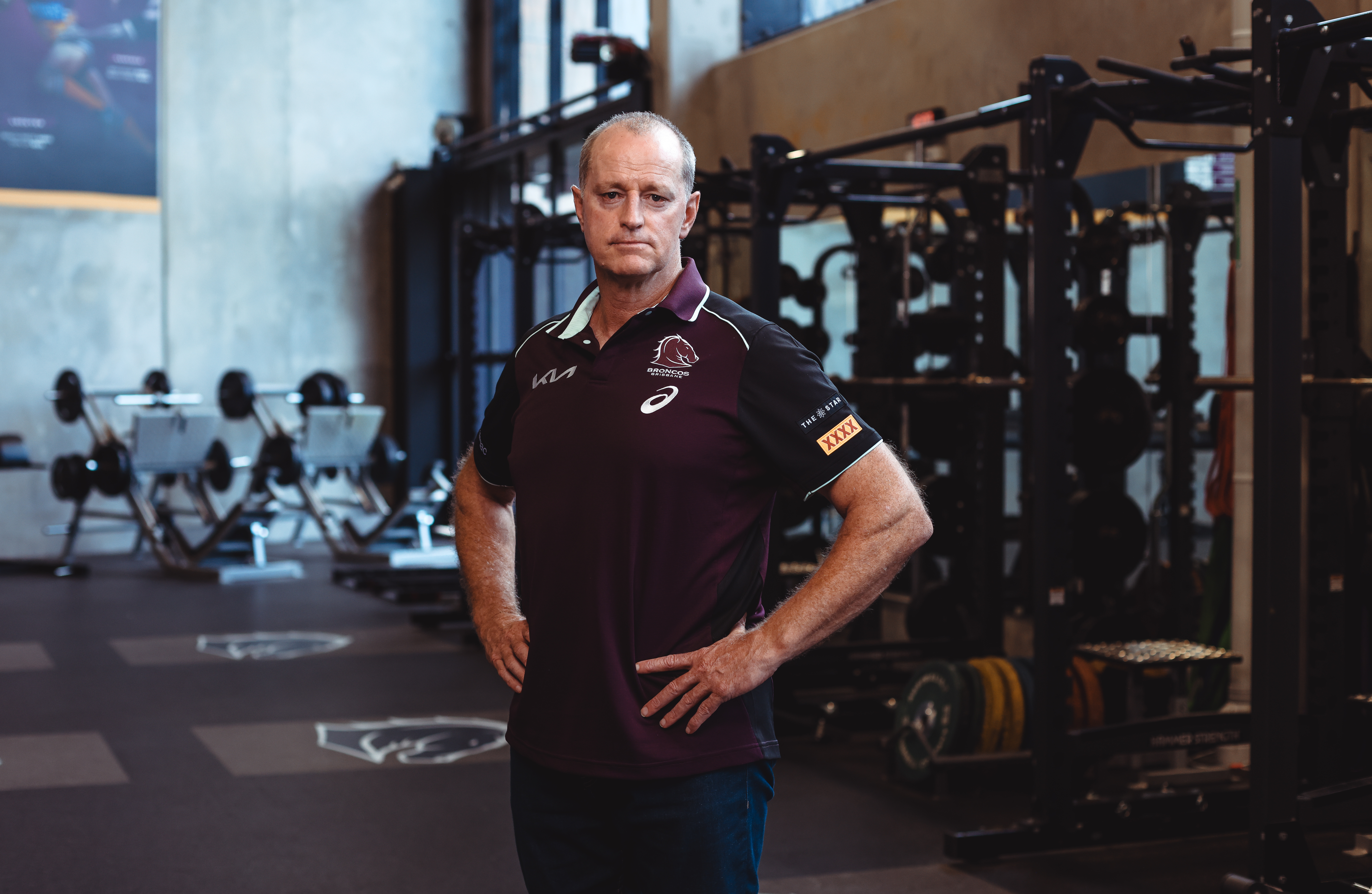
Michael Maguire was announced as the new Brisbane Broncos coach at the beginning of the 2025 season.

==== Regular season ====
Brisbane began the 2025 season having missed the finals in 2024, finishing 12th. This led to the Brisbane board members firing coach Kevin Walters, who took the team to the 2023 final, and hired then-NSW State of Origin coach, Michael Maguire. His hiring immediately started gaining significant attention as shaking the 'Brisbane status-quo', Maguire gave each player a "clean slate" and installed a 'high performance-based' standard, not being afraid to drop players who were not performing or training up to expectations regardless of salary, with the decision process isolating former Brisbane players who had close ties to the club and its pre-Maguire system. The first of these decisions, that would turn out to be a breakthrough moment for the team was the promotion of Gehamat Shibasaki to the main squad who signed to the club on a developmental contract in the off-season. Maguire, in defence of his decision to promote Shibasaki and criticism of his coaching standards and decision making, said "it was about performing at training and (Shibasaki) has done a great job. He has been around first grade before and is not a pup". Maguire also confirmed that Adam Reynolds would remain as captain, in part due to their pre-existing relationship, with Maguire being coach of the Rabbitohs while Reynolds played at the club, with Maguire praising Reynolds leadership skills and connection with the team.

Brisbane announced at the start of the pre-season that 2015 finalist, Ben Hunt would return to the team for the first time since 2017, which surprised the NRL community due to Hunt's history with the club, which was connected to their 2015 grand final loss to the North Queensland Cowboys. When conducting his first media conference back in the pre-season, Hunt stated his reasons for returning to Brisbane included winning a premiership, giving back to the club that gave him his first opportunity in the NRL, and preparing for winding down his playing career. Despite being bought to fill in the hooker position, he spent most of the year filling in his old role during his first stint at the Broncos, playing five-eighth and halfback, due to injuries and suspensions that would cause his teammates to miss the majority of the season.

Despite beginning the season by winning four games in a row, halfway through the season saw Brisbane floundering in eleventh place, with a 5-7 win loss record, losing six of their next seven games. There were constant disruptions throughout the middle part of the season, including a PCL injury for fullback Reece Walsh, an injury for Hunt, along with Ezra Mam's suspension due to an off-field offence, and Martin Taupau being fired by the club due to defamatory posts directed at Maguire. Due to the constant forced changes in their lineup, Brisbane struggled for cohesion throughout middle of the season. Round 23 saw the first of three showdowns against Melbourne, saw Brisbane's struggles going from bad to worse, with Reynolds, Mam and Selwyn Cobbo all sustaining injuries, leaving Brisbane with only 14 players by the end of the match, as Melbourne held the team try-less for the first time since 2021. In addition, both Reynold's and Mam's injuries coincidentally occurred during the same play. With both halves out, coach Maguire made the decision to switch Billy Walters into the five-eighth position, while Hunt once again found himself in the halfback role to fill in the space, Walsh returning as fullback after injury and Patrick Carrigan would take over as captain, decisions that would turn Brisbane's season and form around. This combination would continue to deliver great results for Brisbane into the final quarter of the season, developing into a force and were suddenly in contention for a top four position at the end of the season.

===== Reece Walsh's 'toilet-water' video incident =====
In the lead-up to the final game of the season against Melbourne, Reece Walsh was embroiled in a social media controversy, videoing himself drinking toilet water to aid recovery from training and posting it on his Snapchat account two days after winning against the Cowboys. Brisbane released a statement in response to the media storm that the video caused, stating it was nothing more than a prank, the toilet in question was newly installed inside Walsh's home, and advised the public to not follow Walsh's advice. The video was highly-criticised by most pundits and journalists in the media, calling it "bizarre" and demanding Brisbane intervene to take Walsh off social media. Meanwhile, former Brisbane captain Corey Parker defended Walsh in the media and criticised Brisbane and Walsh being forced to issue an apology, stating, "It blows my mind (and) he’s living rent-free in people’s heads." Walsh changed his Instagram profile picture to himself dressed as a plumber during the week, as a response to the overwhelming attention the video was receiving. Michael Maguire acknowledged the situation regarding Walsh was "unusual" and recognised the differences in maintaining an appropriate public persona during the social media era of the sport, stating, "players of his calibre know how great an influence they can be, and sometimes it can reflect the wrong thing".

In their rematch against Melbourne, only a month after their previous match, it was Walsh, despite the controversy surrounding him in the lead up, who led the team in a 30–14 victory which included Walsh completing two tries, a try-saving tackle, was the designated kicker due to Reynolds absence and a 40/20; with 22 points scored by Brisbane coming from Walsh; with the second of Walsh's tries alluding to the 'toilet-water' video from earlier in the week. When addressing the flak from the 'toilet-water incident' after his player-of-the-match performance, Walsh confirmed that the toilet was recently placed in his home and advised children not trying it at home, while also critiquing the media's response as being "blown out a little bit". Maguire praised Walsh's mental resilience in the surrounding buzz that the video had generated and joked about the incident in his post-match press conference, stating, "I don't think you'll have to worry about toilets." Maguire praised Walsh's training ability and reiterated Walsh's desire to "to win" and was "working hard with the players". This result from the Melbourne victory moved Brisbane to 4th on the ladder, confirming them as the fourth seed heading into the finals series.

==== Finals series ====
Brisbane Broncos' route to the final
| Round | Opposition | Score |
|---|---|---|
| QF | Canberra Raiders (A) | 29–28 |
| SF | BYE | |
| PF | Penrith Panthers (H) | 16–14 |
Key: (H) = Home venue; (A) = Away venue; (N) = Neutral venue

Brisbane's finals series campaign consisted of two record-breaking comebacks in a row, once against Canberra in the qualifying final, and again against Penrith in the preliminary final.

In the qualifying final, Brisbane faced the first-seeded team, the Canberra Raiders, at GIO Stadium. The game saw Walsh sin-binned after headbutting another player as Canberra raced ahead early in the match, leaving Brisbane with an uphill battle to come back and win. Sixteen points down with 15 minutes left in the game, looking like a loss was guaranteed, Carrigan also in the sin bin due to a high tackle and Walsh re-entering the match, the momentum began to shift in Brisbane's favour. Walsh scored a try to shrink the lead to 28-16 in Canberra's favour, only for Brisbane's momentum to continue with tries to Josiah Karapani and Shibasaki, and a successful penalty goal kicked by Walsh to finish the match 28-all, sending the game to extra time. The teams still could not be split during extra time, the match extending into golden point, with Hunt sealing a Brisbane victory with a field goal in the 93rd minute. This game led to journalists and commentators to rank it among the greatest games in NRL history. Maguire was proud of his team, stating in his post-match press conference, "They believed to the end. They worked hard for each other. To see them fight the way they did, it's what we talk about." The victory granted Brisbane a bye, as well as a home preliminary final at Suncorp Stadium, although would lose Carrigan for the preliminary final due to suspension, as well as a season-ending ACL injury to Walters.

In the preliminary final, Brisbane faced the four-time reigning premiers, Penrith—the team that they lost to in the 2023 final, in a sold-out game in Brisbane. This game would see Reynolds and Mam return from injuries that they sustained during their round 23 match against Melbourne. Trailing 14–0 at halftime, Brisbane's game prospects did not look good, and when the second half started and a try to Kotoni Staggs began to turn the momentum, once again, to Brisbane's favour. Brisbane did not lead at any stage of the match until the 78th minute when Reynolds converted a try scored by Mariner to lead 16-14, and would hold the lead until full-time. The win ended Penrith’s streak of five consecutive grand final appearances and their record four-year premiership winning streak. The victory famously had Suncorp Stadium shaking as Brisbane moved on to their second NRL grand final in three years.

When entering the grand final, one of the main concerns for Brisbane was whether they had already played their 'grand final game', after their back-to-back comeback victories against the Raiders and Panthers.

=== Lead-up to the grand final ===
The match-up became one of the most anticipated finals in years, notably due to Brisbane's potential of snapping their longest premiership drought in club history, the exciting finals campaign that saw multiple close games, the form of both Melbourne and Brisbane, the potential redemption story for Ben Hunt, as well as comments made by players and personalities in the NRL.

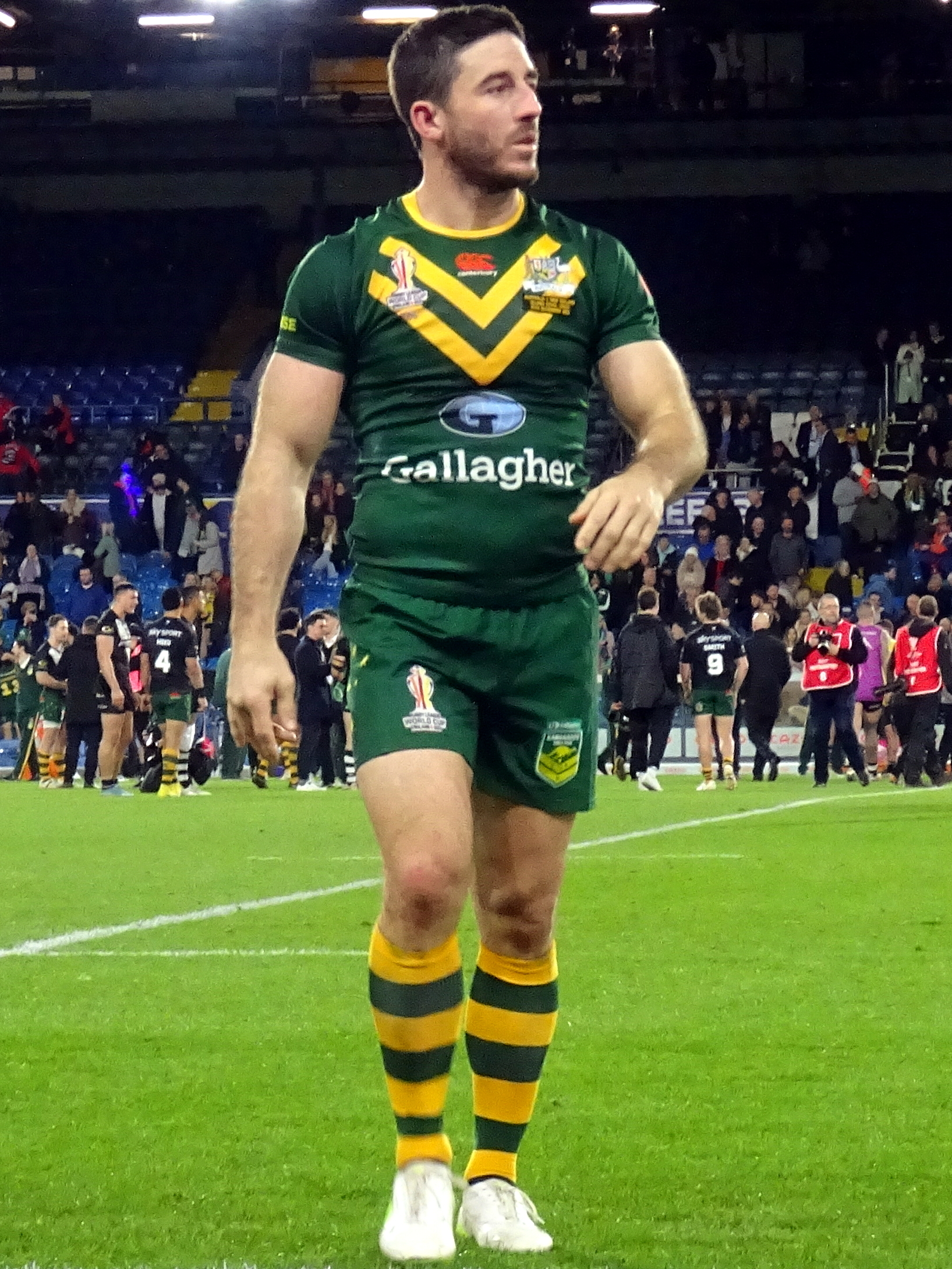
Brisbane's Ben Hunt (pictured playing for Australia) would make his second grand final appearance, ten years after appearing in Brisbane's loss to the North Queensland Cowboys.

One of the most significant storylines in the lead-up to the final was surrounding Brisbane's Hunt. Hunt, famously, during Brisbane's 2015 final against the North Queensland Cowboys, dropped the ball on the kick-off at the start of golden point, which led to Johnathan Thurston kicking a field goal to secure the Cowboys' first premiership. One of the key reasons for Hunt's return to Brisbane was to complete unfinished business and win a premiership specifically for Brisbane. When asked about the opportunity for Hunt's redemption on the grand final stage, Brisbane coach Michael Maguire, stated, "It would be a great story, wouldn't it? (He) is a legend ... To see his resilience through everything. He has been able to come back now with a great group and they look up to (him)."

Immediately after Brisbane beat Penrith to book their spot in the final, Melbourne prop Stefano Utoikamanu directed criticisms towards players in Brisbane's team, who he refused to name, saying, "There are a lot of people I think are a bit stuck up. There are going to be a lot of people I want to run at, a lot of people I don’t like on this team". When asked about Utoikamanu's comments, Brisbane's prop, Payne Haas, took a different approach, not wanting to add fuel to the fire, saying they would "focus on ourselves" and "worry about our own preparation". Maguire was asked about Utoikamanu's comments and stated that each player has their own motivations and that it would not faze his team. Melbourne coach Craig Bellamy was "surprised" by Utoikamanu's comments, but opted not to comment further. Former Storm captain, Cameron Smith, was also "surprised" at Utoikamanu's comments, elaborating Melbourne's and Bellamy's "under the radar" approach to media in previous grand finals. Smith emphasised the importance of Utoikamanu playing a great game and not allowing the comments to backfire on the rest of the team.

Bellamy set an NRL record, reaching 11 grand finals as a coach, the most in NRL history. In addition, Melbourne had won seventeen of the past nineteen games against Brisbane, with their only two losses occurring during the 2023 qualifying final and round 27 earlier in the year. Additionally, Bellamy's coaching record against Maguire was 14 wins and two losses. Melbourne as a club were looking for their first premiership without Smith, Billy Slater or Cooper Cronk since 1999.

A notable talking point, was the NRL's decision to place Melbourne's preliminary final on Friday and Brisbane's on a Sunday to avoid a clash with the AFL final that occurred between the Brisbane Lions and Geelong Cats on Saturday. The main criticism stemming from Melbourne being given an extra two days of rest and preparation, citing it as an unfair advantage. Bellamy admitted that he believed it gave his team an advantage, while Maguire disagreed with the discourse by mentioning the turnaround from State of Origin, having a smaller timeframe and not making much of a difference in team performance.

== Pre-match ==
=== Broadcasting ===
==== Television ====
The match was broadcast live across Australia on the Nine Network and simulcast on Nine's streaming service, 9Now. Coverage began 10am, with a special edition of Wide World of Sports, with Cameron Smith and James Tedesco added as guest panellists. The broadcast continued at 11am with the Sunday Footy Show presenting live at Accor Stadium, hosted by Emma Lawrence, alongside Andrew Johns, Billy Slater and Brad Fittler. The NRL State Championship and NRLW Grand Final took place alongside separate commentary teams, with the official pre-match show beginning at 6:30 pm.

Nine
| | Commentary | Slideline |
| NRL Grand Final | Mathew Thompson, Andrew Johns, Billy Slater | Danika Mason, Brad Fittler |
| NRLW Grand Final | Brenton Speed, Allana Ferguson, Ruan Sims | Darren Lockyer, Marlee Silva |
| NRL State Championship | Peter Psaltis, Phil Gould, Cameron Smith | Marlee Silva, Johnathan Thurston |

Foxtel, the pay TV broadcaster for the NRL season, which included Fox League and Kayo Sports, were not allowed to show the NRL final live, instead showing a replay with their own commentary team after the match had concluded. They were, however, allowed to conduct their own coverage of the pre-match, as well as the NRLW and State Championship finals.

Overseas, the game was broadcast on Sky Sport in New Zealand, Sky Sports in the United Kingdom, TVWAN in Papua New Guinea and the Pacific Island regions, BeIN Sports in France, ESPN Africa, Sportsnet World in Canada, Premier Sports Asia and Fox Sports 2 in the United States.

==== Radio ====
ABC, Triple M (Brisbane and Sydney only), SEN, 2GB, 4BC and NRL Nation broadcast the final, live on radio. Triple M announced that their commentary team would be led by Dan Ginnane, alongside Gorden Tallis, James Graham and Ben Dobbin. SEN's national feed would be provided by Joel Caine, Brett Kimmorley and Scott Sattler. SEN also provided individual commentary feeds for Brisbane and Melbourne listeners; with Brisbane's provided by Mark Braybrook, Andrew McCullough and Corey Parker, and Melbourne by Jordan Kounelis and Robbie Kearns.

=== Officiating ===
Following his performance in the preliminary finals, Grant Atkins was appointed as the referee for the Grand Final. It was Atkins first NRL Grand Final as referee after he was the video referee for the 2022 and 2024 matches. Ashley Klein was appointed as the video referee in the NRL bunker. Chris Sutton and David Munro were appointed as the touch judges.

=== Entertainment ===
American singer, Teddy Swims headlined the pre-game entertainment. Swims performed his songs "Bad Dreams", "The Door", a cover of AC/DC's "T.N.T.", and closing with "Lose Control". Swims, who had an illness in the week leading up to the performance, was forced to pull out of shows of his tour in the lead-up, confirmed doctors had approved him to perform before the final took place.

== Teams ==
Melbourne returned to the grand final with 15 members of their starting 17 having played in the previous season's decider. For the second successive season, Nelson Asofa-Solomona would miss the match after he was suspended for three matches on a grade two careless high tackle charge by the NRL Judiciary following the round 27 match between the two grand finalists. Melbourne halfback Jahrome Hughes, went into the match still nursing a broken arm, with the injury ironically occurring during their round 27 match against Brisbane, only receiving clearance to return for their preliminary final the previous week. Fullback, Ryan Papenhuyzen was also still nursing concussion symptoms from games earlier in the season. Melbourne contained three players, Papenhuyzen, Hughes and Cameron Munster, who had previously played for Melbourne when they won the 2020 NRL Grand Final.

Brisbane's injury list was proving a concern in the lead-up to the final, with Adam Reynolds' fitness in particular causing concern. With injury concerns in mind, particularly after the season-ending injury to Billy Walters in the qualifying final, Brisbane placed Hunt and Reynolds in the halves, Cory Paix as hooker, and Ezra Mam, who was also returning from a hamstring injury, starting the game on the interchange bench if an injury were to hit any of them throughout the match. Brisbane would also see lock and vice-captain, Patrick Carrigan return from a one-match suspension, with Ben Talty omitted from the Brisbane team. Out of all the Brisbane team, only Reynolds had previously won a grand final, playing for the South Sydney Rabbitohs in 2014.

| Melbourne | Brisbane |

Team details
| Melbourne Storm | | Position | Brisbane Broncos |
| Name | Number | Position | Number | Name |
|---|---|---|---|---|
| Ryan Papenhuyzen | 1 | Fullback | 1 | Reece Walsh |
| Will Warbrick | 2 | Wing | 2 | Josiah Karapani |
| Jack Howarth | 3 | Centre | 3 | Kotoni Staggs |
| Nick Meaney | 4 | Centre | 4 | Gehamat Shibasaki |
| Xavier Coates | 5 | Wing | 5 | Deine Mariner |
| Cameron Munster | 6 | Five eighth | 6 | Ben Hunt |
| Jahrome Hughes | 7 | Half back | 7 | Adam Reynolds (c) |
| Stefano Utoikamanu | 8 | Prop forward | 8 | Corey Jensen |
| Harry Grant (c) | 9 | Hooker | 9 | Cory Paix |
| Josh King | 10 | Prop forward | 10 | Payne Haas |
| Shawn Blore | 11 | Second row | 11 | Brendan Piakura |
| Eliesa Katoa | 12 | Second row | 12 | Jordan Riki |
| Trent Loiero | 13 | Lock forward | 13 | Patrick Carrigan |
| Tyran Wishart | 14 | Interchange | 14 | Ezra Mam |
| Ativalu Lisati | 15 | Interchange | 15 | Kobe Hetherington |
| Tui Kamikamica | 16 | Interchange | 16 | Xavier Willison |
| Alec MacDonald | 17 | Interchange | 17 | Tyson Smoothy |
| Joe Chan (not used) | 20 | Reserve | 18 | Jesse Arthars (not used) |
| Craig Bellamy | | Coach | | Michael Maguire |
RLP

== Match summary ==
=== Scoreboard ===
2025 NRL Grand Final

Sunday, 5 October
19:30 AEDT (UTC+11)

| Melbourne Storm | 22 – 26 | Brisbane Broncos |
|---|---|---|
| Tries: 4 Meaney 8'; Katoa 14'; Warbrick 22'; Hughes 35'; Goals: 3 Meaney 9', 16', 37' (3/4); Sin bin: Loiero (yellow card) 78' to 80' | 1st: 22–12; 2nd: 0–14; Report | Tries: 5 Mariner 3', 55'; Shibasaki 46', 58'; Walsh 31'; Goals: 3 Reynolds 4', 32' (2/3); Walsh 59' (1/2) |

Accor Stadium, Sydney
Attendance: 80,223
Referee: Grant Atkins
Video referee: Ashley Klein
Touch judges: Chris Sutton, David Munro
Clive Churchill Medal: Reece Walsh (Brisbane)

=== First half ===
==== Kickoff—20th minute ====
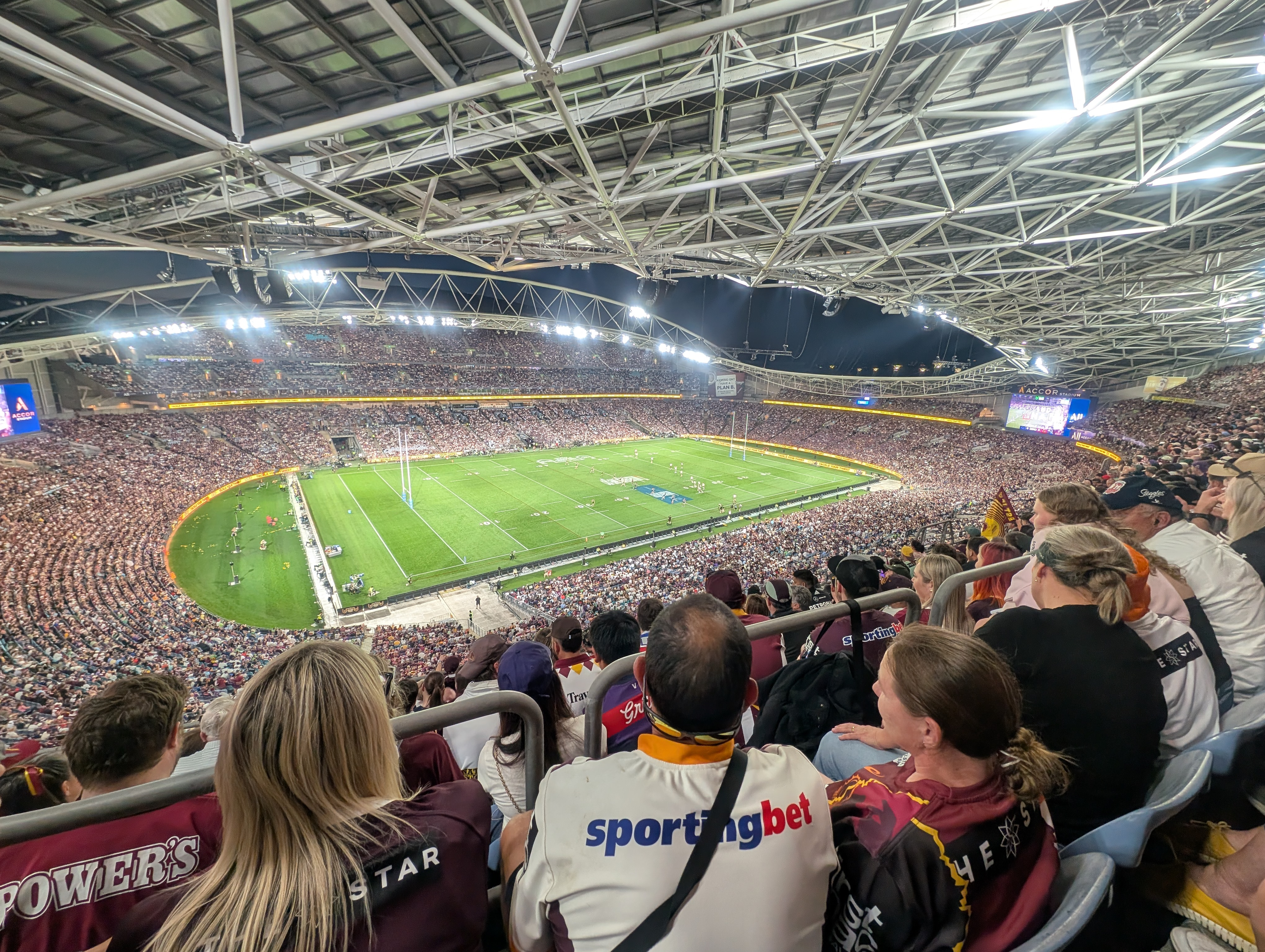
The crowd at the grand final in Accor Stadium, Sydney

The match kicked off at 7:30 pm AEDT before a crowd of 80,223.

Brisbane were the first team to receive the ball in the match with Corey Jensen taking the first tackle, only for Brisbane to receive a penalty three tackles later with Melbourne's Harry Grant committing a tackle infringement on Payne Haas. After this penalty, Brisbane scored their first try inside two minutes when Reece Walsh offloaded a pass on the right for winger, Deine Mariner, who nearly stepped out of bounds to ensure that Adam Reynolds had an easier conversion kick. Melbourne's first try occurred only five minutes later, as Stefano Utoikamanu received the ball after a scrum to move within 20 metres off the try line, and a quick play-the-ball led to Nick Meaney breaking through Brisbane's defence and scoring, while also converting his own try to level the score line.

Melbourne's attack, led by Cameron Munster and Jahrome Hughes, began to make inroads in Brisbane's defence, which lead to Melbourne receiving a penalty for Brisbane escorting Xavier Coates off the ball near Melbourne's try line. Melbourne also received a six again, as Munster launched off the play the ball and fooled Brisbane into committing an offside offence. Melbourne scored the next converted try on the 15th minute, with Katoa taking advantage of Brisbane's disjointed defence due to multiple set restarts for defensive infringements, catching a grubber kick by Hughes and scoring near the goal posts. The next set after Melbourne's second try, Jack Howarth suffered a groin injury, leading Melbourne to go to their interchange bench earlier than planned with Tyran Wishart taking Howarth's place.

==== 21st minute—half-time ====
Brisbane was struggling to attack Melbourne's defence and was unable to break out of their own half. A high tackle by Walsh on Coates, led to a Melbourne penalty within metres of the tryline, with both lead referee Grant Atkins and Bunker referee Ashley Klein ruling the tackle a foul rather than a sin-bin, due to Coates already falling when Walsh made the tackle. Melbourne's attack continued to place pressure on Brisbane, with a try to Will Warbrick in the 23rd minute due to a pass from Eliesa Katoa that allowed Warbrick to beat three defenders to the try line. Meaney missed the conversion attempt, leaving the scoreline at 16-6. Melbourne's relentless attack continued until Utoikamanu dropped the ball, leading to a scrum for Brisbane. After Ryan Papenhuyzen knocked out a kick from Reynolds, Brisbane had their first repeat set since the beginning of the match. Melbourne's defence struggled to keep up, conceding two set restarts throughout the set, with Brisbane nearly crossing over for a try twice, only for Warbrick to catch a kick by Reynolds. Melbourne were able to complete a set afterwards, only for a kick to go out of play past the try line, leading to a seven-tackle set for Brisbane. During this set, Brisbane were given a penalty for Hughes committing a high tackle, with Melbourne's defence staying resilient and earning the ball back, only for Melbourne to stay 30 metres in their own half, forcing Munster to perform a large kick down the field to set Brisbane back.

In the 31st minute, Walsh singlehandedly sprinted through the Melbourne defence with no players marking him and were unable to catch him once he broke through. Reynolds successfully kicked the conversion to cut Melbourne's lead to four points. After Walsh's try, Ezra Mam entered the game off the interchange bench and slotted into the five-eighth role, while Hunt moved to hooker and Cory Paix was rested. Brisbane began to establish some momentum, with a 40/20 attempt by Hunt, only to narrowly miss, with Melbourne able to get to the ball in time. In the meantime, Brendan Piakura was sent off for a head injury assessment - later confirmed to be okay and would return in the second half. Alec MacDonald also left the field with a suspected elbow injury after an attempted tackle on Walsh.

Melbourne scored again five minutes before the first half ended, with Hughes side-stepping three Brisbane players to score, with Meaney converting the kick, extending Melbourne's lead to 10-points. Melbourne wrestled the momentum back, with only a catch from Mariner stopping Melbourne's attack from advancing any further. Brisbane came within centimetres of scoring on half-time with Xavier Willison being stopped by Melbourne's defence after passes from Hunt and Walsh.

At half time, Melbourne had 59% possession of the ball in play, compared to Brisbane's 41%; while Melbourne's run metres were significantly higher than Brisbane's running at 868 metres compared to Brisbane's 631 metres. Shibasaki had run the most metres out of all players on the field, with Papenhuyzen running the most metres for Melbourne. Maguire remained calm during half-time, citing his team's previous comeback wins against Canberra and Penrith in the weeks prior, while acknowledging that their discipline needed tidying up.

=== Second half ===
==== Half-time—54th minute ====
Melbourne started as the stronger team in the few minutes into the second half, continuing the momentum they established at the end of the first half. Melbourne received possession of the ball quickly after Reynolds kicked the ball out on the full during Brisbane's first attacking set. This led to Tui Kamikamica seemingly crossing over for a try during the next set play. This try was overturned by bunker referee Klein, as the video evidence uncovered that Kamikamica had dropped the ball just before the try line due to pressure from Walsh. With the Kamikamica no-try, Brisbane began turning the momentum around, while Melbourne started to appear rattled by the dropped try and began making errors in their defensive structure. The Kamikamica error also leading to Brisbane scoring a try the next set, with Gehamat Shibasaki beating Meaney in a one-on-one play, crossing over as Melbourne's defence began to fatigue and struggled to keep up with Brisbane's attack.

Eight minutes into the second half, while trying to chase down the Melbourne defensive line, Reynolds suffered a calf injury after a kick and chase attempt. After repeatedly trying to stand up and continue on, and then trying to walk off the field without assistance, Reynolds was carried from the field by Brisbane's trainers, bursting into tears once he reached the sideline and was taken directly to the change rooms to undergo medical assessment, subsequently ruled unfit to continue. Hunt was then moved to halfback, while Mam continued as five eighth. With Reynolds out, Walsh became the designated kicker for Brisbane.

With Reynolds off the field, Brisbane continued the momentum they had gained after the Kamikamica no-try, with Brisbane being given a penalty after Grant was found to have tripped Mam over in the midfield. Mam then managed to force a goal line dropout after a perfect kick that landed in the scoring area forcing Melbourne to scramble and stop the scoring attempt. After winning a short kick off, Walsh continued his phenomenal form, fooling Melbourne's defence to all be offside leading to Brisbane being given another six tackles. Brisbane looked as though they had scored again with Josiah Karapani reaching the tryline, only for Walsh's pass to Karapani ruled to be forward. Melbourne received the ball back, only for Warbrick to quickly lose the ball from a tackle by Mam, giving Brisbane the ball back.

==== Last 25 minutes of the match ====
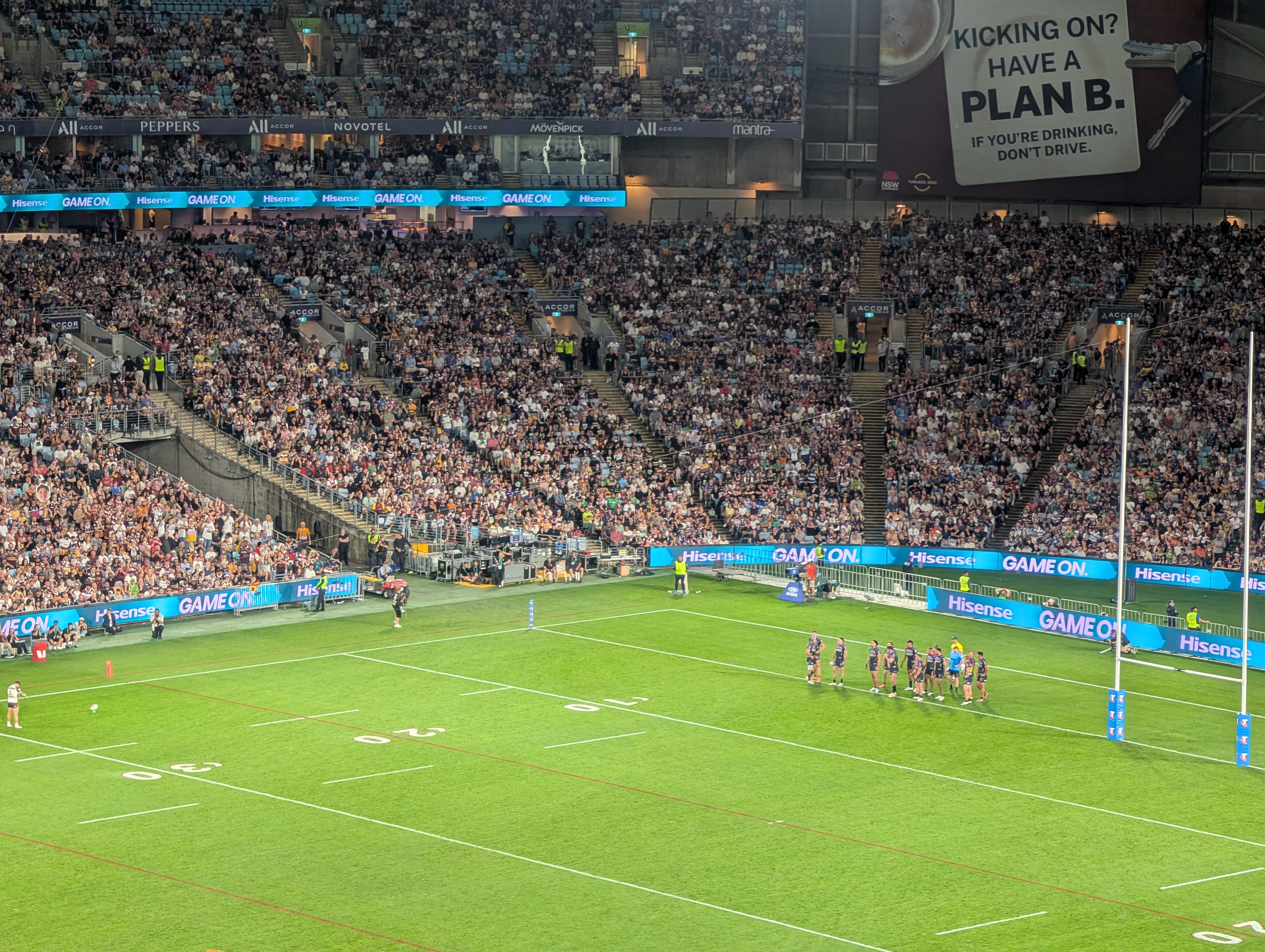
Reece Walsh lining up for a goal conversion attempt during the second half.

On the 55th minute, ten metres away from Melbourne's try line, Paix passed the ball to Walsh, who then passed it to Mariner, leading to Brisbane's fourth try of the match. After taking over kicking duties, Walsh missed the conversion, leaving Brisbane two points behind Melbourne. The next set after the Mariner try, Brisbane scored again with Shibasaki's second try, with Walsh again performing the pass that allowed Shibasaki to cross over the try line and successfully converted the goal to lead 26-22. Melbourne's struggles went from bad to worse, beginning when Wishart dropped a pass from Papenhuyzen, giving Brisbane the ball back. Melbourne earned back the ball from Brisbane two sets in a row, only for a poor kick in their first set after losing the lead, and Warbrick in their second set "nutmegging" a pass from Meaney and was taken out of bounds by Mam. Karapani was forced off the field due to NRL medical staff intervening for a potential concussion. Afterwards, Papenhuyzen managed a line break through Brisbane's defence in the 68th minute, only to perform a flick pass with no teammates around him and was tackled by Brisbane players as Brisbane regained the ball.

With eight minutes left, Hunt was left concussed after a tackle on Ativalu Lisati went awry, hitting his head on the Melbourne player's knee, leaving Hunt stumbling on the verge of falling over with Walsh running to catch him. Walsh continued to hold Hunt up, resting Hunt's head on his shoulder to avoid him from falling again, while trainers and medical staff made their way onto the field, with Hunt immediately declared unfit to continue. Walsh's quick-thinking to avoid further injury for Hunt was praised by media, medical staff and fans. With Reynolds out injured already, this left interchange player, Tyson Smoothy, to fill in the halfback role alongside Mam. Warbrick managed to find open space, only to be chased down by Mam, which was later ruled a high tackle, thus giving Melbourne another chance to score only twenty metres away from the try line.

Within the last five minutes, Piakura performed a try-saving tackle on Papenhuyzen, which lead to a penalty for Melbourne for a high tackle. Melbourne received the ball and found themselves within five metres from the tryline, with an opportunity to level the score, only for Mariner performing a tackle on Coates one metre from the tryline and Kotoni Staggs entering the tackle to push Coates over the sideline, a moment that would prove decisive in the game. With two minutes to go, Trent Loiero was sent to the sin bin, for a shoulder charge on Piakura, leaving Melbourne with twelve men on the field for the final ninety seconds of the game. In the final minute, with Melbourne pressing 30 metres from the try line, Walsh made a decisive try-saving tackle on Papenhuyzen after Katoa broke Brisbane's defensive line, preserving the 26–22 result, with Jordan Riki catching an intercept pass to finish the game.

== Post-match ==
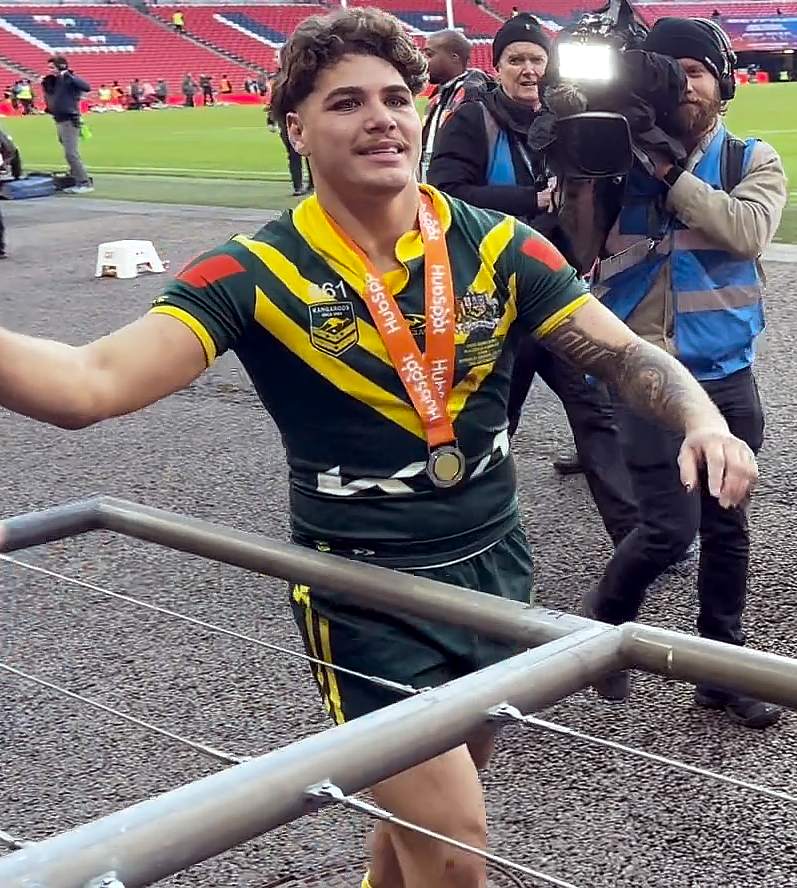
Reece Walsh (pictured playing for Australia) was awarded the Clive Churchill Medal, with his match considered as one of the best grand final performances in NRL history.

=== Brisbane's reactions ===
Reece Walsh was awarded the Clive Churchill Medal for player of the match for a performance that featured a try, three try assists, 176 running metres, 14 tackle breaks and several defensive plays, including a try-saving tackle on Ryan Papenhuyzen with only one minute left. His performance during the grand final was praised by many pundits and former players, including Johnathan Thurston, Andrew Johns, Adrian Morley and Phil Gould, who named it as one of the best in NRL Grand Final history. (Note: As cited by) His post-match speech alluded to the controversy from the 'toilet-water incident' before their previous game against Melbourne, signing off his speech with "plumber out" and similarly gesturing his hand to the original video. Walsh and Michael Maguire were spotted drinking from toilet-shaped cups during Brisbane's victory celebrations, while Walsh was also given a life-sized toilet from a fan in the crowd and carried it around the field. When asked in the post-match press conference what helped turn his form around towards the end of the season, Walsh replied, "drinking out of a toilet". Notably, since the toilet-water video was posted, Brisbane went undefeated, Walsh's match performances were among the best of his career to date, and his good humour surrounding the incident subsequently praised as he became linked to sponsorship opportunities and turned the incident into an amusingly upbeat memorable moment, with comparisons to former Australian cricketer Shane Warne. Walsh also aimed at Stefano Utoikamanu's comments about Brisbane after the final on social media, chanting "Stefano's stuck, we up", alluding to Utoikamanu's comment that Brisbane's players were "stuck up". The only blemish was a $3000 fine for his high tackle on Xavier Coates in the first half.

Brisbane was praised for their resilience, building on their last-minute comeback victories against Canberra and Penrith, remaining fearless when trailing by 10 points, scoring 14 unanswered points during the second half and maintaining momentum despite the losses of Reynolds, Hunt and Karapani. Brisbane's attack prowess on the wings and centres proved pivotal in the second half, with all their tries coming from one of those positions, most of whom were try assists by Walsh. After their loss to Penrith in 2023, when Penrith came back in the final minutes, Brisbane's resilience and growth became evident as the match progressed, with Maguire noting that their newfound "belief" established at the beginning of the season helped them stay calm. Despite Maguire receiving criticism at the beginning of the season for training the team too hard, Brisbane's fitness contributed to their superior attack and defence in the second half. Along with Walsh, Brendan Piakura was the only other Brisbane player to receive a fine, $1800, for dangerous contact.

When presented with the Provan-Summons Trophy, Reynolds invited injured teammate, Billy Walters, to raise the trophy with him in honour of his contribution to Brisbane's end-of-season resurgence. He was named on Brisbane's extended squad, allowed to travel with the team and remain on the field if Brisbane won, so he could participate in celebrations. Walters thought he would be "a little bit more jealous", instead feeling happy he witnessed the moment from the sidelines, adding that although he would not be given a premiership ring due to NRL regulations, raising the trophy was "ten times better". Despite this, Walters said the win still felt bittersweet, due to his father, Brisbane's previous coach Kevin Walters, no longer part of the team from this season.

Ten years after famously dropping the kick-off at golden point in the 2015 Grand Final against the North Queensland Cowboys, Ben Hunt received loud cheers around the stadium when conducting his post-match interview and receiving his ring. Speaking to Brad Fittler on Nine's broadcast, saying, "I’m just on top of the world. So much hard work for so many years. I never dreamt of coming back to this club, and to get back here and get back to this club ... it’s an absolute dream come true." Hunt's redemption arc was also acknowledged and congratulated on by Melbourne captain Harry Grant in his concession speech.

Brisbane also set a record of becoming the first club in NRL history to win both the men's and women's premierships in the same year, with the women's team victorious over the Sydney Roosters earlier in the day. Both men's and women's teams celebrated together, with a victory parade at Suncorp Stadium the day after the final. Additionally, with the Brisbane Lions' win in the AFL, the city of Brisbane held both Australian sporting code trophies simultaneously for the first time.

=== Melbourne's reaction ===
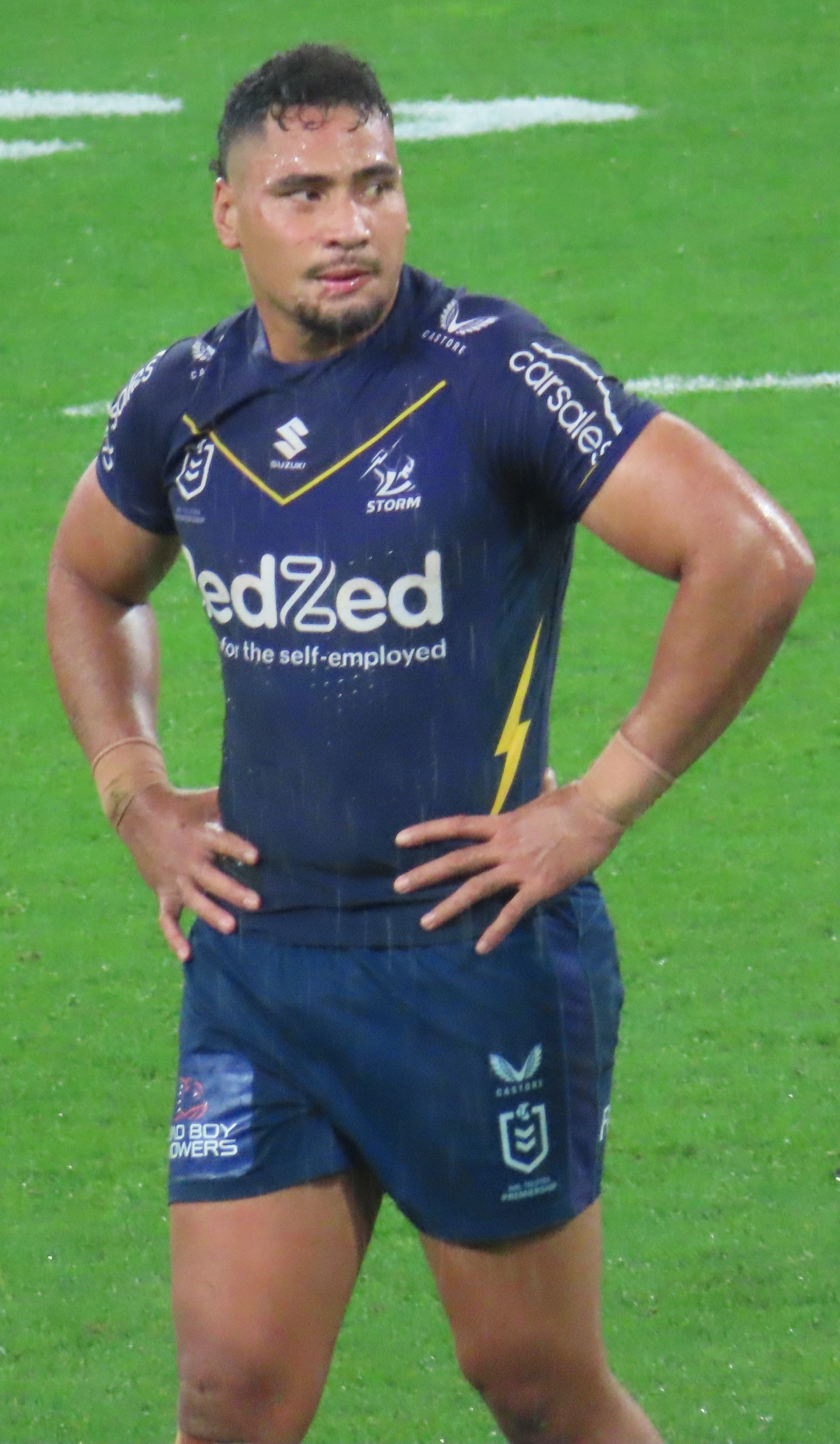
Eliesa Katoa (pictured in 2023), was deemed to be the Melbourne Storm's best player in the grand final, with one try and one try assist.

Melbourne's loss made them the first team to suffer back-to-back losses at a grand final since the Sydney Roosters in 2003 and 2004. Melbourne's inconsistencies from first-half to second-half, which had been an issue all season, once again occurred in the final, despite leading by ten points at half-time were admittedly error-prone throughout the second half. In addition, Brisbane's strategy of focusing on restricting Cameron Munster and Harry Grant's abilities in attack significantly contributed to Melbourne's inconsistency and errors, with both men having "quiet nights" in comparison to their form leading up to the grand final, with both of them making eight runs combined throughout the match. Former Melbourne captain, Cameron Smith, was critical of Melbourne's performance in the second half, stating on the Nine broadcast that Melbourne's inconsistent form in games throughout the year had come back to haunt them, despite a "super" and "comfortable" first half, which turned into being unable to score in the second. Melbourne's discipline was also an issue throughout, with Trent Loiero given a two-match suspension for his tackle on Brendan Piakura that sent him to the sin bin in the 78th minute, while Jahrome Hughes was charged with dangerous contact and was fined $1000.

Melbourne coach, Craig Bellamy, stated in the post-match press conference that Melbourne "weren't good enough on the night." When asked by the media what the team could have done to stop Walsh, Bellamy replied, "Tackle him". Cameron Munster echoed this when asked about his team's performance after the match concluded, stating, "We defended for too long at the back end of that game, in the first 15 minutes we gave them too much ball and the result speaks for itself." Melbourne captain, Grant, criticised the NRL's decision to not send Walsh to the sin-bin for his tackle on Xavier Coates in the second half, despite Grant himself being sent off for a similar tackle during the regular season, emphasising that it was not the fault of lead referee, Grant Atkins, and that the decision was "coming from above", with members of the media interpreting the statement as a condemning of bunker referee, Ashley Klein, who decided to give Brisbane a penalty. Despite the criticism, Grant praised Brisbane for how they "turned up and owned the moment".

In spite of the team's loss, Eliesa Katoa was praised for his performance, with one try and one try assist. His try-assist pass leading to Will Warbrick's try in the 22nd minute receiving high-amounts of praise for its accuracy and speed. Katoa additionally nearly won the match for Melbourne when he broke Brisbane's defensive line in the final two minutes, only to be thwarted when he passed the ball to Papenhuyzen who was instantly tackled by Walsh. This match would later prove to be his final match for Melbourne for 12 months, sustaining a severe head injury, leading to a seizure and brain bleed when playing an international match for Tonga two months after the grand final.

=== Viewership ===
In Australian television ratings, the Grand Final averaged 4.55 million viewers nationally on Nine, the most viewed free-to-air program of 2025 and became the highest rating NRL Grand Final broadcast in history, reaching 6.4 million viewers throughout the broadcast. The match also became the most streamed program in Nine Network history, with 1.3 million viewers watching it on 9Now. The match was also watched by 181,000 viewers on Sky Sport in New Zealand.

The match out-rated the AFL Grand Final’s viewership numbers for the first time in ten years. One of the deciding factors behind the additional viewership was the close and nail-biting match between Brisbane and Melbourne, with the victory not being decided until the final second, encouraging more viewers to stay for the entire duration. In comparison, the AFL final saw the eventual-winning team, the Brisbane Lions, likely becoming the premiers 20 minutes before the match concluded.

== Opening matches ==
Two opening matches were played on the ground prior to the grand final: the NRL State Championship and NRL Women's Grand Final. Both matches were broadcast live throughout Australia by the Nine Network.

=== NRL State Championship ===
2025 NRL State Championship

Sunday, 5 October
13:20 AEDT (UTC+11)

| New Zealand Warriors | 50 – 20 | Burleigh Bears |
|---|---|---|
| Tries: 9 Tu 15', 40'; Tuaupiki 27', 61'; Hanson 52', 67'; Leaitaua 10'; Boyd 23'; Lussick 30'; Goals: 7 Boyd 11', 17', 25', 31', 54', 63', 68' (7/9) | 1st: 32–6; 2nd: 18–14; Report | Tries: 4 Geyer 36'; Moore 58'; Rogers 70'; Watson 74'; Goals: 2 Rogers 37', 59' (2/4) |

Accor Stadium, Sydney
Referee: Jarrod Cole
Video referee: Liam Kennedy
Touch judges: Kieren Irons, Nick Pelgrave
Player of the Match: Tanah Boyd (Warriors)

Team details
| New Zealand Warriors | | Position | Burleigh Bears |
| Name | Number | Position | Number | Name |
|---|---|---|---|---|
| Taine Tuaupiki | 1 | Fullback | 1 | Nicholas O'Meley |
| Setu Tu | 2 | Wing | 2 | Troy Leo |
| Ali Leiataua | 3 | Centre | 3 | Sami Sauiluma (c) |
| Moala Graham-Taufa | 4 | Centre | 4 | Kea Pere |
| Edward Kosi | 5 | Wing | 5 | Mitch Watson |
| Luke Hanson | 6 | Five eighth | 6 | Josh Rogers |
| Tanah Boyd | 7 | Half back | 7 | Guy Hamilton |
| Bunty Afoa | 8 | Prop forward | 8 | Fletcher Baker |
| Samuel Healey | 9 | Hooker | 9 | Paul Roache |
| Tanner Stowers-Smith | 10 | Prop forward | 10 | Matthew Koellner |
| Kayliss Fatialofa | 11 | Second row | 11 | Adam Christensen |
| Eddie Ieremia-Toeava | 12 | Second row | 12 | Ewan Moore |
| Kalani Going (c) | 13 | Lock forward | 13 | Sam Coster |
| Jett Cleary | 14 | Interchange | 14 | Cole Geyer |
| Jason Seu Salalilo | 15 | Interchange | 15 | Lorenzo Mulitalo |
| Tom Ale | 16 | Interchange | 16 | Takitau Mapapalangi |
| Freddy Lussick | 17 | Interchange | 17 | Lochlyn Sheldon |
| Geronimo Doyle (not used) | 18 | Reserve | 18 | Jordan Scott (not used) |
| David Tangata-Toa | | Coach | | Luke Burt |
RLP

=== NRL Women's Premiership Grand Final ===
2025 NRL Women's Premiership Grand Final

Sunday, 5 October
16:00 AEDT (UTC+11)

| Sydney Roosters | 18 – 22 | Brisbane Broncos |
|---|---|---|
| Tries: 3 Parker 46'; Lopamaua 51'; Wood 54'; Goals: 3 Kelleher 48', 53', 56' (3/3) | 1st: 0–12; 2nd: 18–10; Report | Tries: 4 Upton 18'; Ferguson 29'; Sauaso 61'; Hufanga 66'; Goals: 3 Teitzel 20', 31' (2/3); Clarke 66' (1/1) |

Accor Stadium, Sydney
Attendance: 46,288
Referee: Belinda Sharpe
Video referee: Chris Butler
Touch judges: Ethan Klein, Rochelle Tamarua
Karyn Murphy Medal: Mele Hufanga (Brisbane)

Team details
| Sydney Roosters | | Position | Brisbane Broncos |
| Name | Number | Position | Number | Name |
|---|---|---|---|---|
| Brydie Parker | 1 | Fullback | 1 | Tamika Upton (c) |
| Jayme Fressard | 5 | Wing | 2 | Kerri Johnson |
| Jessica Sergis | 3 | Centre | 3 | Mele Hufanga |
| Isabelle Kelly (c) | 4 | Centre | 4 | Julia Robinson |
| Mia Wood | 16 | Wing | 5 | Hayley Maddick |
| Corban Baxter | 6 | Five eighth | 6 | Gayle Broughton |
| Jocelyn Kelleher | 7 | Half back | 7 | Ali Brigginshaw (c) |
| Otesa Pule | 8 | Prop forward | 8 | Annetta-Claudia Nu'uausala |
| Keeley Davis | 9 | Hooker | 14 | Destiny Brill |
| Rima Butler | 10 | Prop forward | 10 | Brianna Clark |
| Aliyah Nasio | 11 | Second row | 11 | Lauren Dam |
| Jasmin Strange | 12 | Second row | 12 | Romy Teitzel |
| Olivia Kernick | 13 | Lock forward | 13 | Keilee Joseph |
| Shawden Burton | 14 | Interchange | 9 | Jada Ferguson |
| Macie Carlile | 15 | Interchange | 15 | Chelsea Lenarduzzi |
| Eliza Lopamaua | 17 | Interchange | 16 | Shenae Ciesolka |
| Jayde Herdegen (not used) | 18 | Interchange | 17 | Shalom Sauaso |
| Taneisha Gray (not used) | 20 | Reserve | 18 | Reegan Hicks (not used) |
| John Strange | | Coach | | Scott Prince |
RLP
