= Corey Jensen =

Australian rugby league footballer

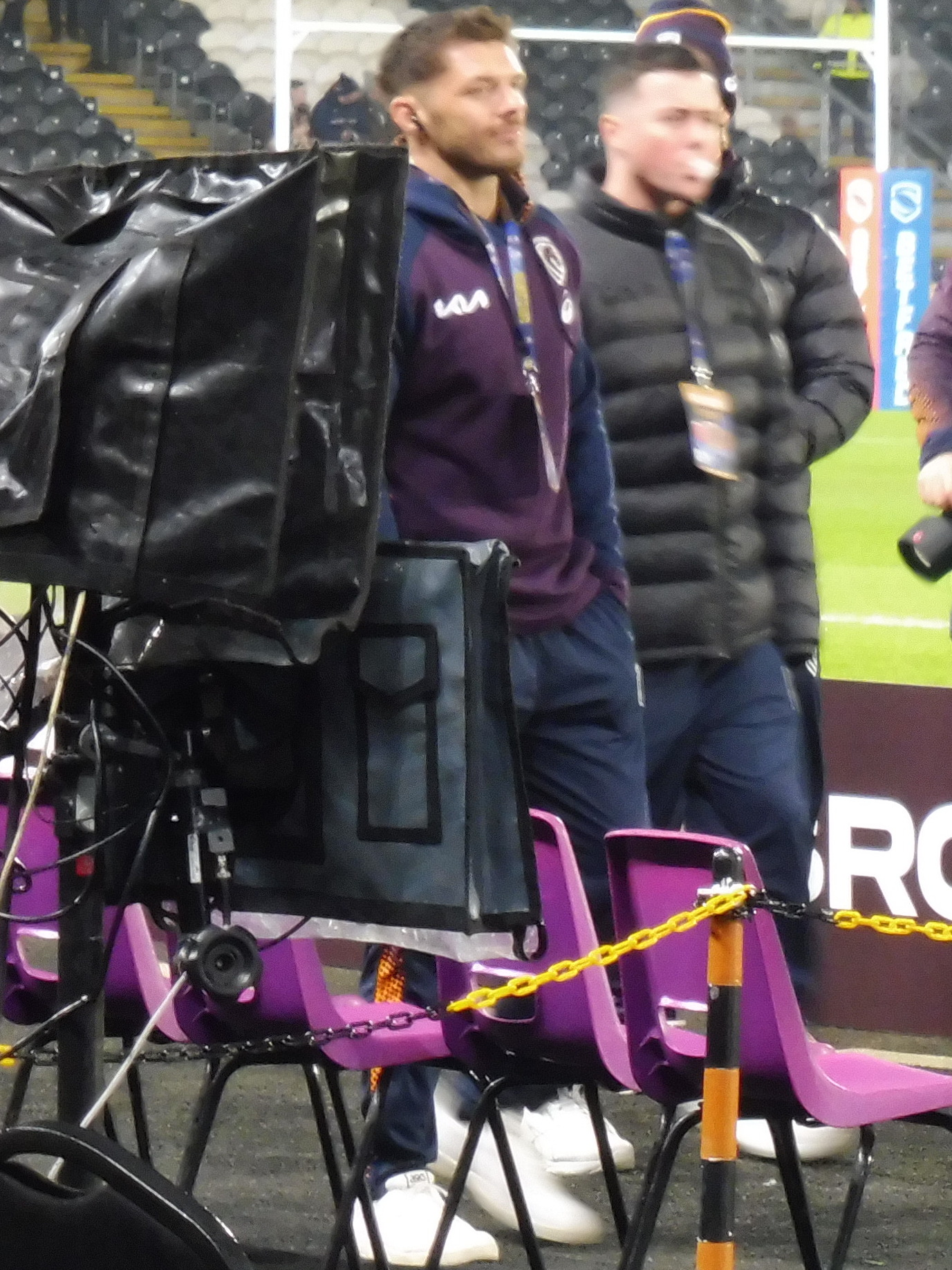

Personal information
- Born: 8 January 1994 (age 32) Townsville, Queensland, Australia
- Height: 188 cm (6 ft 2 in)
- Weight: 107 kg (16 st 12 lb)

Playing information
- Position: Prop
Club
Years	Team	Pld	T	G	FG	P
2017–21	North Qld Cowboys	58	1	0	0	4
2022–26	Brisbane Broncos	95	2	0	0	8
	Total	153	3	0	0	12
Representative
Years	Team	Pld	T	G	FG	P
2016–19	Queensland Residents	2	1	0	0	8
- Source: As of 21 October 2026

Corey Jensen (born 8 January 1994) is an Australian former professional rugby league footballer who played as a prop for the Brisbane Broncos, and previously the North Queensland Cowboys in the National Rugby League. He won the 2025 NRL Grand Final with the Broncos. On the 30 July 2026, he announced his immediate retirement from the NRL citing multiple pulmonary embolisms which would require him to take blood thinning medication for the rest of life, forcing him to medically retire.

== Background ==
Jensen was born in Townsville, Queensland, Australia and was raised in Bowen, Queensland.

In 2008, he was the U14 All Schools National Champion in the Discus, Hammer throw & Shot put.

He played his junior rugby league for the Bowen Seagulls and attending Bowen State High School. In 2011, Jensen moved to Townsville to attend Ignatius Park College.

== Playing career ==
=== Early career ===
In 2010, Jensen played for the Townsville Stingers Cyril Connell Cup side and was selected for the Queensland under-16 team. In 2011, he moved up to the Stingers' Mal Meninga Cup side and toured England and France with the Australian Institute of Sport team, alongside future first graders Kodi Nikorima, Euan Aitken, Nene Macdonald and Brendan Elliot.

In 2012, Jensen started the season playing for the Stingers' Mal Meninga Cup side again before making his NYC debut for the North Queensland Cowboys. That year he was also selected for the Queensland under-18 team.

In 2015, after three seasons with the Cowboys' NYC side, Jensen joined the Townsville Blackhawks in the Queensland Cup. In 2016, he was selected for the Queensland Residents rugby league team and signed a one-year deal with the Cowboys, joining their NRL squad.

=== 2017 ===
After starting the season with the Townsville Blackhawks, Jensen made his NRL debut in Round 7, coming off the bench against the St George Illawarra Dragons. In Round 16, he scored his first NRL try in the Cowboys' 14–12 win over the Penrith Panthers. On 28 July, he re-signed with the Cowboys until the end of the 2019 season. On 1 October, Jensen started on the interchange bench in the Cowboys' 2017 NRL Grand Final loss to the Melbourne Storm. He ended his rookie season with 17 games and one try. On 6 October, he was named the Cowboys' Rookie of the Year.

=== 2018 ===
Jensen played 18 games for the Cowboys in 2018, starting at prop in Rounds 13 and 16.

=== 2019 ===
Jensen played just six NRL games in 2019, spending the majority of the season with the Townsville Blackhawks. In May, he was the vice-captain of the Queensland Residents side that defeated New South Wales Residents. On September 2, Jensen signed a two-year contract extension with the Cowboys.

=== 2020 ===
Jensen played eight NRL games in 2020, making appearances in Round 1 and Round 6 before returning to the side in Round 15. He played in the last six games of the season, including a start at prop in the Cowboys' Round 19 loss to the Penrith Panthers.

=== 2022 ===
Jensen played a total of 18 games for Brisbane in the 2022 NRL season as the club finished 9th on the table.

=== 2023 ===
Jensen played a total of 21 games for Brisbane in the 2023 NRL season. Jensen did not feature in the clubs finals campaign nor the 2023 NRL Grand Final where they lost to Penrith 26-24.

=== 2024 ===
Jensen made 24 appearances for Brisbane in the 2024 NRL season which saw the club miss the finals finishing 12th on the table.

=== 2025 ===
On 11 September, Brisbane announced that Jensen had extended his contract with the team for a further two years. Jensen played 25 matches for Brisbane in the 2025 NRL season including the club’s 2025 NRL Grand Final victory over Melbourne.

=== 2026 ===
On 19 February, Jensen played in Brisbane's World Club Challenge loss against Hull Kingston Rovers. On 20 April, Jensen was ruled out for several weeks after scans showed he suffered multiple pulmonary embolisms. On 1 July 2026, the Broncos announced that Jensen would be ruled out for the rest of the season as he was undergoing further assessment and was placed on the blood thinning medication Warfin, making him unable undertake contact training for a period of six months. On 30 July 2026, a statement from the Broncos was made that since Jensen did not have an underlying condition causing the clots, he would have to stay on the medication for the rest of his life and he could not undertake physical contact needed for rugby league, effectively forcing him to retire.

== Achievements and accolades ==
=== Individual ===
- North Queensland Cowboys Rookie of the Year: 2017
- Brisbane Broncos Most Consistent: 2024

=== Team ===
- NRL Grand Finalist: 2017, 2025
- NRL Pre-Season Challenge Winner: 2024, 2025
- NRL Premiership: 2025

=== Representative ===
- Residents Origin Test Winner: 2019

== Statistics ==
=== NRL ===
Season	Team	Matches	T	G	GK %	F/G	Pts
2017	North Queensland Cowboys	17	1	0	—	0	4
2018	North Queensland Cowboys	18	0	0	—	0	0
2019	North Queensland Cowboys	6	0	0	—	0	0
2020	North Queensland Cowboys	8	0	0	—	0	0
2021	North Queensland Cowboys	9	0	0	—	0	0
2022	Brisbane Broncos	18	0	0	—	0	0
2023	Brisbane Broncos	21	0	0		0	0
2024	Brisbane Broncos	24	1	0		0	4
2025	Brisbane Broncos	25	1	0		0	4
2026	Brisbane Broncos	7					
Career totals		153	3	0	—	0	12
