= Stefano Utoikamanu =

Samoa & Tonga international rugby league footballer

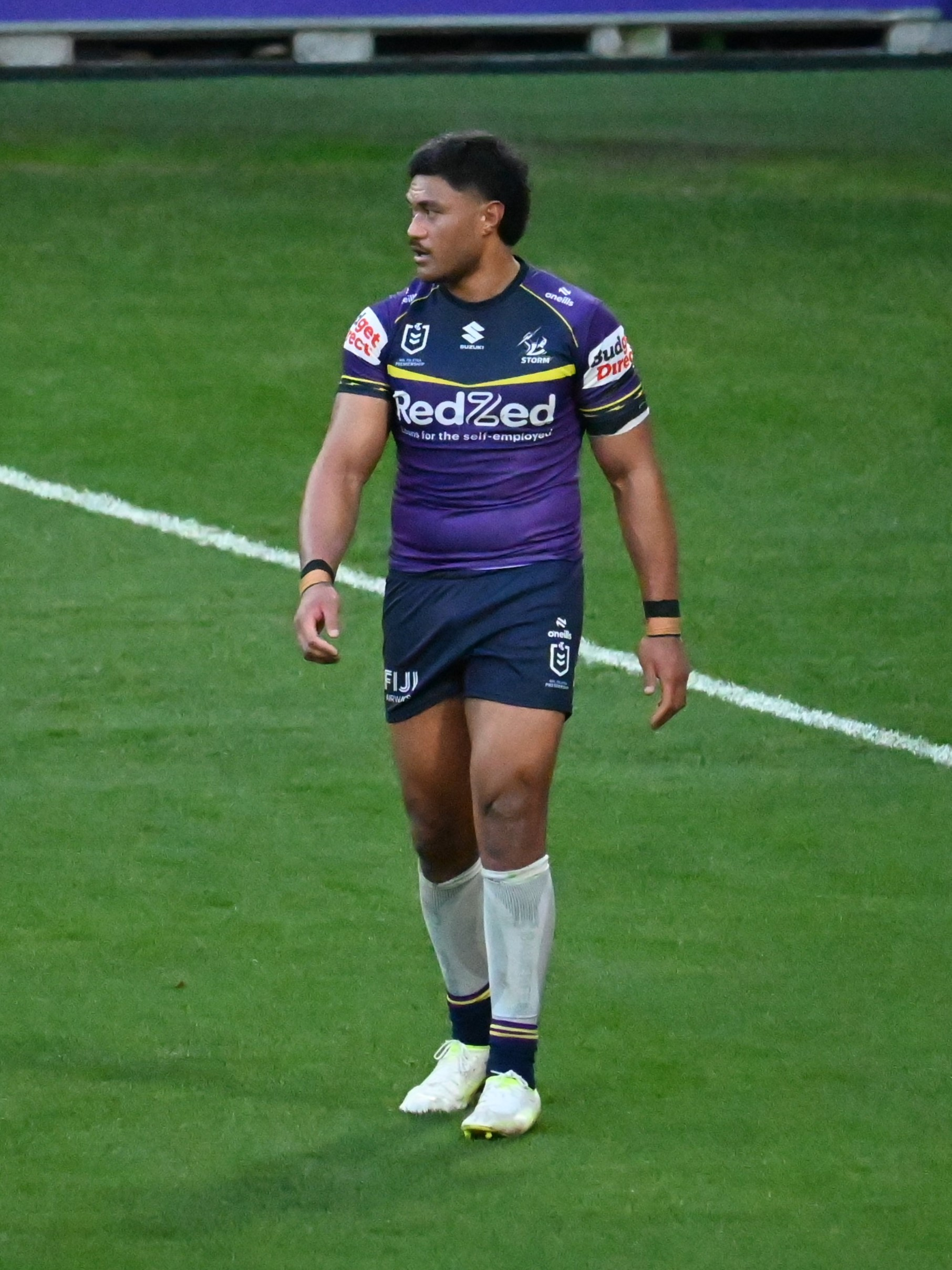

Personal information
- Born: 15 May 2000 (age 26) Auckland, New Zealand
- Height: 194 cm (6 ft 4 in)
- Weight: 115 kg (18 st 2 lb)

Playing information
- Position: Prop
Club
| Years | Team | Pld | T | G | FG | P |
|---|---|---|---|---|---|---|
| 2020 | Parramatta Eels | 3 | 0 | 0 | 0 | 0 |
| 2021–24 | Wests Tigers | 75 | 11 | 0 | 0 | 44 |
| 2025– | Melbourne Storm | 49 | 5 | 0 | 0 | 20 |
| | Total | 127 | 16 | 0 | 0 | 64 |
Representative
| Years | Team | Pld | T | G | FG | P |
| 2023–25 | New South Wales | 3 | 0 | 0 | 0 | 0 |
| 2023 | Samoa | 2 | 0 | 0 | 0 | 0 |
| 2025– | Tonga | 5 | 1 | 0 | 0 | 4 |
- Source: As of 7 November 2026

Stefano Utoikamanu (born 15 May 2000) is a professional rugby league footballer who plays as a prop for the Melbourne Storm in the National Rugby League (NRL). He has played for Samoa and Tonga at international level.

He previously played for the Wests Tigers and Parramatta Eels in the NRL.

== Background ==
Utoikamanu played his junior rugby league for the Cabramatta Two Blues. Utoikamanu played for Parramatta's under 20's team in 2018 and 2019, moving into ISP competition for Wentworthville. Utoikamanu is of Tongan and Samoan descent.

== Playing career ==
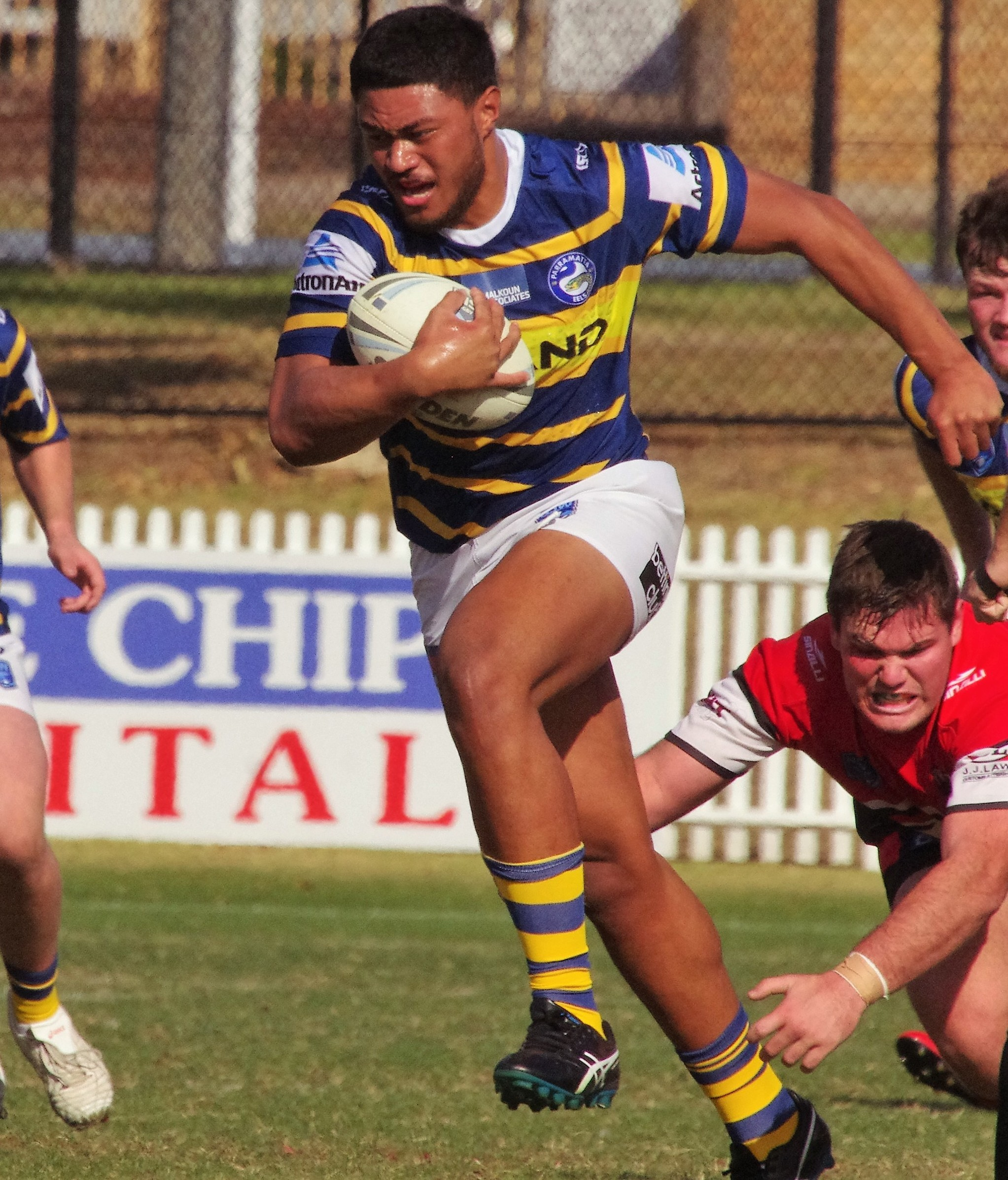
Utoikamanu playing for the Parramatta Eels Under-20s in 2018

=== 2020 ===
On 29 January 2020, Utoikamanu signed a three-year deal with the Wests Tigers from 2021 worth $800,000 which was significantly higher than Parramatta's offer of $70,000 a season.

Utoikamanu made his first grade debut in round 9 of the 2020 NRL season for Parramatta against the Newcastle Knights. He came off the bench in the final ten seconds of the game and made one hit-up as Parramatta won the match 10-4. Following the game, Utoikamanu was spotted hugging and interacting with fans which was strictly against player protocols during the COVID-19 pandemic.

=== 2021 ===
He made his club debut for the Wests Tigers in round 1 of the 2021 NRL season against Canberra which ended in a 12-30 defeat. He scored his first try in the NRL during round 3 of the competition as the club defeated Newcastle 24-20. On 5 July, he was called into the New South Wales squad for game 3 of the 2021 State of Origin series. He was named on the extended bench but did not feature in the match.

He played a total of 22 games for the Wests Tigers in the 2021 NRL season as the club finished 13th and missed the finals.

=== 2022 ===
On 31 January, he extended his existing contract that was until the end of 2023, for a further two seasons, keeping him at the club until the end of the 2025 season. On 29 March, it was announced that Utoikamanu would miss six to eight matches with an ankle injury which occurred during the club's loss to the New Zealand Warriors. In round 9, he made his return to the side against Manly but was sent to the sin bin for a professional foul during the club's 36-22 loss at Brookvale Oval. Utoikamanu played a total of nine games for the Wests Tigers club in the 2022 NRL season as they finished bottom of the table and claimed the Wooden Spoon for the first time.

=== 2023 ===
On 22 May, Utoikamanu was selected by New South Wales as part of their extended squad ahead of game one in the 2023 State of Origin series. On 12 June, Utoikamanu was named on the interchange bench for New South Wales in game two of the 2023 State of Origin series. Utoikamanu played a total of 21 games for the Wests Tigers in the 2023 NRL season as the club finished with the Wooden Spoon for a second straight year.

=== 2024 ===
On 29 July, Utoikamanu announced that he would be departing the Wests Tigers at the end of the season. On 2 August, Utoikamanu signed a three-year deal to join Melbourne starting in 2025. He played 24 games for the Wests Tigers throughout the 2024 NRL season as the club finished with the Wooden Spoon for a third consecutive year.

=== 2025 ===
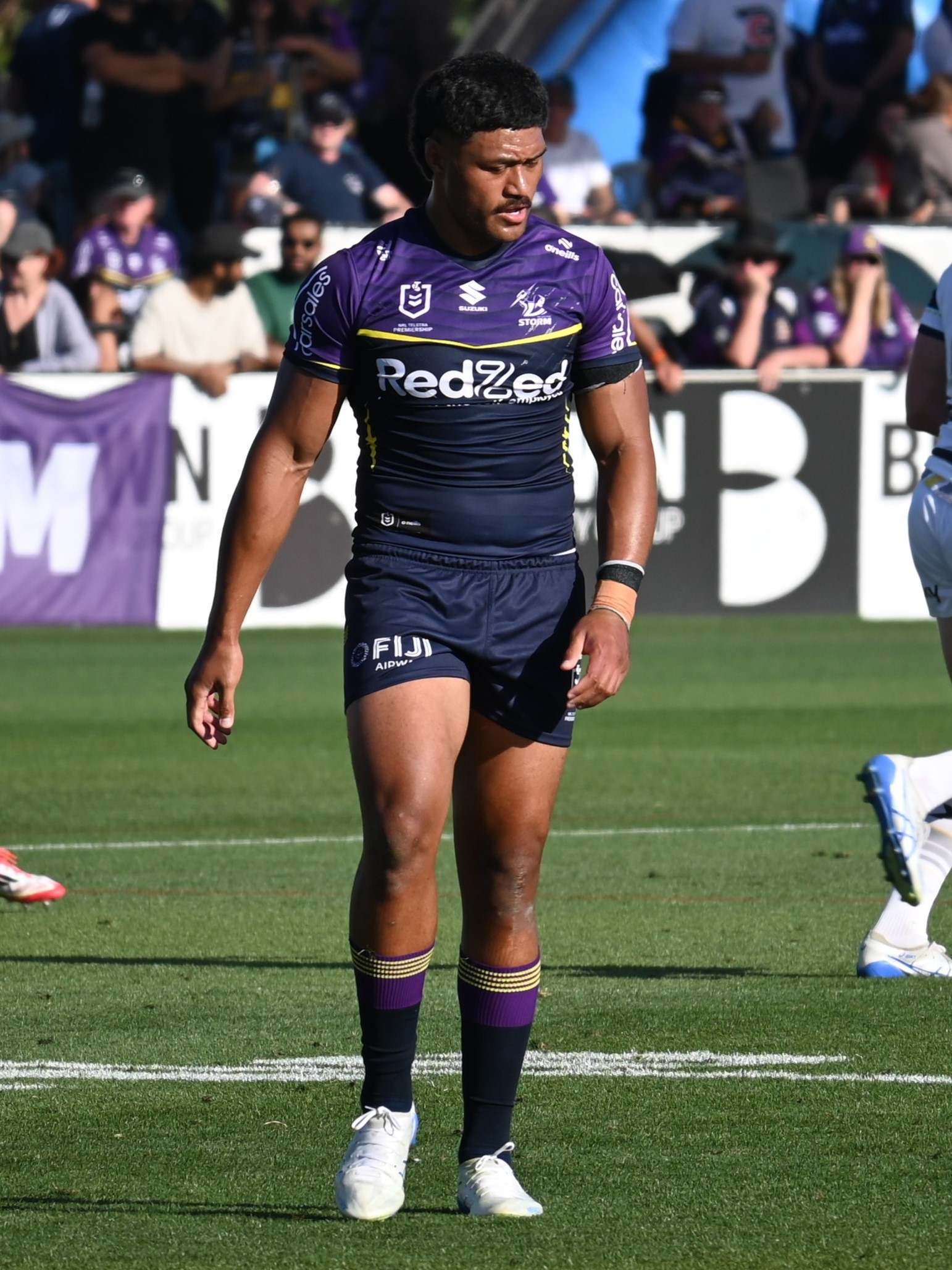
Utoikamanu joined the Melbourne Storm ahead of the 2025 NRL season.

In round 1 of the 2025 NRL season, Utoikamanu made his Melbourne Storm debut against the Parramatta Eels. He was presented with his debut jersey (cap 239) by former Melbourne Storm Front Rower Robbie Kearns. In June, Utoikamanu was selected by New South Wales for game two of the 2025 State of Origin series. Before the game, Utoikamanu stated he would be targeting the Queensland forwards but in the match itself he only managed five carries for 39 metres. New South Wales would go on to lose the match 26-24. Utoikamanu was once again retained for game three in the series which New South Wales would lose 24-12. Utoikamanu was criticised for his performance in game three with the player only making four runs and gaining 41 metres. Utoikamanu played 25 games for Melbourne in the 2025 NRL season including their 26-22 2025 NRL Grand Final loss against Brisbane. Before the grand final, Utoikamanu had made inflammatory comments in the media by calling some of the Brisbane players "stuck up".

=== 2026 ===
He played 24 games for Melbourne in the 2026 NRL season as the club finished 10th on the table, missing the finals for the first time since 2010.

== Statistics ==
| Year | Team | Games | Tries | Pts |
|---|---|---|---|---|
| 2020 | Parramatta Eels | 3 | | |
| 2021 | Wests Tigers | 21 | 6 | 24 |
| 2022 | Wests Tigers | 9 | | |
| 2023 | Wests Tigers | 21 | 2 | 8 |
| 2024 | Wests Tigers | 24 | 3 | 12 |
| 2025 | Melbourne Storm | 25 | 2 | 8 |
| 2026 | Melbourne Storm | 19 | 2 | 8 |
| 2027 | Melbourne Storm | | | |
| | Totals | 122 | 15 | 60 |
