= Cory Paix =

Australian rugby league footballer

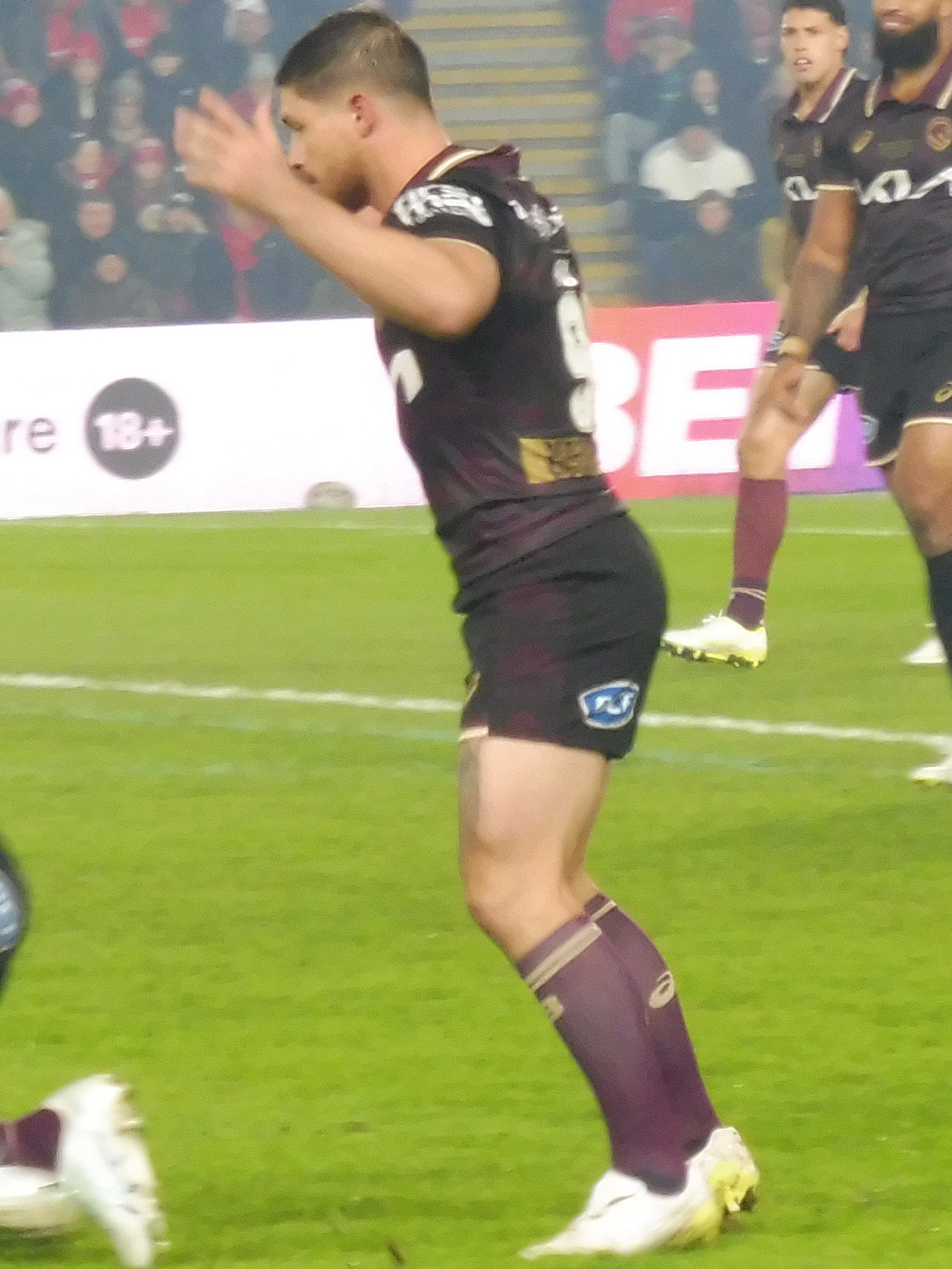

Personal information
- Full name: Cory Paix
- Born: 27 January 2000 (age 26) Toowoomba, Queensland, Australia
- Height: 178 cm (5 ft 10 in)
- Weight: 89 kg (14 st 0 lb)

Playing information
- Position: Hooker
Club
Years	Team	Pld	T	G	FG	P
2020–	Brisbane Broncos	85	9	0	0	36
- Source: As of 6 November 2026

Cory Paix (/ˈpeɪks/) (born 27 January 2000) is an Australian professional rugby league footballer who plays as a hooker for the Brisbane Broncos in the National Rugby League, with whom he won the 2025 NRL Grand Final.

== Playing career ==
=== 2018 ===
In 2018, Paix played for the Norths Devils U20s Colts team which won the premiership at Suncorp Stadium against the Blackhawks. The team also featured young Broncos Ethan Bullemor, Jordan Riki, and Kobe Hetherington.

=== 2020 ===
Paix made his debut in round 4 of the 2020 NRL season for Brisbane against the Sydney Roosters. Paix in Round 9 won his first NRL game against the Canterbury-Bankstown Bulldogs in a 26-8 victory. Paix in Round 15 scored his first NRL try against the St. George Illawarra Dragons, in a 24-28 loss. Paix made 13 appearances in his debut season which saw Brisbane finish last on the table for the first time in their history.

=== 2021 & 2022 ===
Paix was limited to only four matches in the 2021 NRL season which saw Brisbane miss the finals. Paix played 12 games for Brisbane in the 2022 NRL season as the club finished 9th on the table and missed the finals.

=== 2023 ===
Paix played a total of 15 games for Brisbane in the 2023 NRL season. Paix did not feature in the clubs finals campaign or the 2023 NRL Grand Final loss against Penrith.

=== 2025 ===
On 11 September, the Brisbane outfit announced that Paix had extended his contract for a further year. Paix played 23 matches for Brisbane in the 2025 NRL season including the clubs 2025 NRL Grand Final victory over Melbourne.

=== 2026 ===
On 19 February, Paix played in Brisbane's World Club Challenge loss against Hull Kingston Rovers. On 31 March 2026, Brisbane announced that Paix had re-signed with the club for a further two years. Paix featured in 18 matches for Brisbane in the 2026 NRL season as the club finished 14th on the table.

== Statistics and Honours ==
Year	Team	Games	Tries	Pts
2020	Brisbane Broncos	13	1	4
2021	Brisbane Broncos	4		
2022	Brisbane Broncos	12	1	4
2023	Brisbane Broncos	15	2	8
2025	Brisbane Broncos	23	3	12
2026	Brisbane Broncos	18	2	8
	Totals	85	9	36

=== Honours ===
Individual

- Queensland Cup Hooker Of The Year: 2024

Team

- NRL Pre-Season Challenge Winner: 2024, 2025
- NRL Grand Finalist: 2025
- NRL Premiership: 2025
