= Ezra Mam =

Australian rugby league footballer

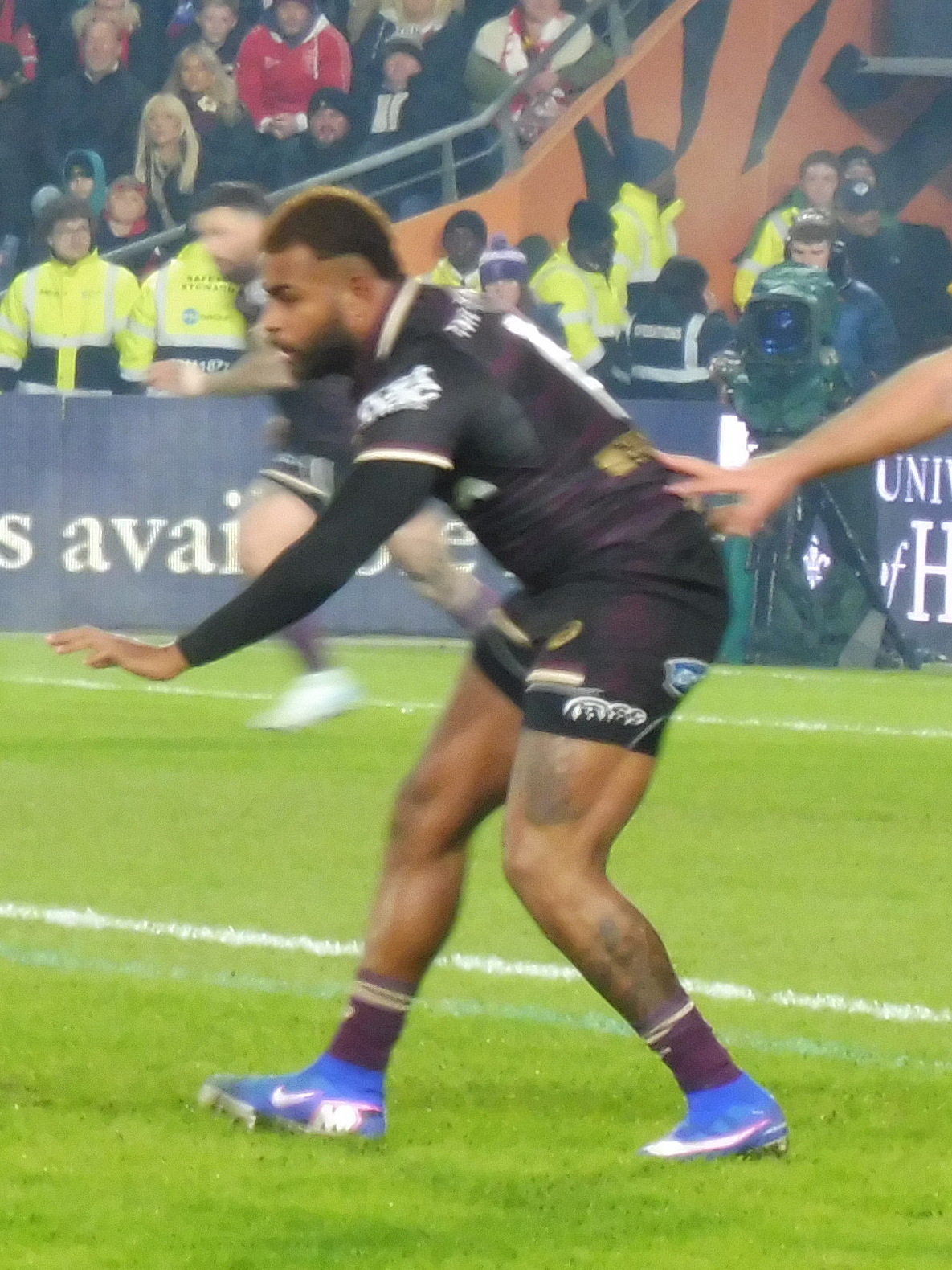

Personal information
- Full name: Ezra Alam Mam
- Born: 31 January 2003 (age 23) Sydney, New South Wales, Australia
- Height: 176 cm (5 ft 9 in)
- Weight: 85 kg (13 st 5 lb)

Playing information
- Position: Five-eighth
Club
Years	Team	Pld	T	G	FG	P
2022–	Brisbane Broncos	91	48	0	0	192
Representative
Years	Team	Pld	T	G	FG	P
2026	Prime Minister's XIII	1	3	0	0	12
- Source: As of 6 November 2026

Ezra Mam (born 31 January 2003) is an Australian professional rugby league footballer who plays as a five-eighth for Brisbane Broncos in the National Rugby League, with whom he won the 2025 NRL Grand Final.

== Background ==
Ezra Alam Eric Tom Amber-Mam was born in Sydney into a family of Aboriginal descent from Far North Queensland (Kuku Yalanji). He moved to Queensland at a young age, grew up in Ipswich and played junior rugby league for the Goodna Eagles. Mam attended Ambrose Treacy College in Indooroopilly, Brisbane and played rugby union for their 1st XV team. At the age of thirteen, Mam accepted an offer to participate in the Brisbane Broncos' rugby league development system.

== Career ==
=== Early career ===
Mam won the Rookie of the Year in the 2021 Intrust Super Cup season while playing for Souths Logan Magpies finishing the season with thirteen tries, eight try assists and seven goals in just eleven games.

=== 2022 ===
Mam made his first grade debut for the Brisbane and set up two tries in their 36–12 win against the Newcastle in round 11 of the 2022 NRL season. In Round 12, Mam scored his first try NRL try in a 35–24 win over the Gold Coast Titans. Mam played a total of thirteen games for Brisbane throughout the year scoring six tries. Brisbane finished the 2022 season in ninth place.

=== 2023 ===
In round 2 of the 2023 NRL season, Mam scored two tries in Brisbane's 28–16 win over arch-rivals North Queensland. In round 8, Mam was sent to the sin bin for a hip drop tackle on Parramatta's Matt Doorey during Brisbane's 26–16 victory. In round 22, Mam scored two tries in Brisbane's 32-10 victory over the Sydney Roosters. Mam played twenty-five games for Brisbane in the 2023 NRL season and scored eighteen tries to equal highest amount for a five-eighth in a season. Mam played in Brisbane's 24-26 loss against Penrith in the 2023 NRL Grand Final where he scored a second half hat-trick.

=== 2024 ===
In round 5 of the 2024 NRL season, Mam scored two tries for Brisbane in their 32-34 loss against Melbourne. Mam made nineteen appearances for Brisbane in the 2024 NRL season and scored nine tries; the club missed the finals and finished twelfth on the table.

=== 2025 ===
In round 11 of the 2025 NRL season, Mam made his return to the Brisbane side in their 30-26 loss against St. George Illawarra. The following week, Mam was booed every time he touched the ball during Brisbane's 34-6 loss against Manly at Brookvale Oval. On 9 June 2025, Mam was controversially picked by Queensland for game two of the 2025 State of Origin series. Mam was named on the extended bench. Mam played 12 games for Brisbane in the 2025 NRL season including the clubs 2025 NRL Grand Final victory over Melbourne.

=== 2026 ===
On 19 February 2026, Mam played in Brisbane's World Club Challenge loss against Hull Kingston Rovers.

Mam played 23 matches for Brisbane in the 2026 NRL season as the club finished a disappointing 14th on the table.

He made his Prime Minister's XIII début on 3 October 2026 in the 10-60 win over PNG Prime Minister's XIII in Port Moresby, scoring 3 tries.

=== Honours ===
Individual

- Queensland Cup Rookie Of The Year: 2021
- Brisbane Broncos Rookie Of The Year: 2022
- Dally M Five-Eighth Of The Year: 2023

Team

- NRL Grand Finalist: 2023, 2025
- NRL Pre-Season Challenge Winner: 2024
- NRL Premiership: 2025

== Off-field incidents ==
In October 2024, Mam was reportedly involved in an altercation with a fan in Bali.

Due to a Brisbane head-on car crash in October that injured 3 others - including a young girl who required hospitalisation for a fractured hip, Mam was issued a traffic infringement notice for failing to keep control of a vehicle. He appeared in Brisbane Magistrates Court on 16 December 2024 on charges of drive while relevant drug is present in blood, and driving without a licence. After pleading guilty, Mam was fined $850 and suspended from driving for six months. The NRL subsequently suspended Mam for nine Brisbane Broncos matches in 2025 and fined him $30,000 for bringing the game and club into disrepute.

Additionally, the Brisbane Broncos fined Mam $90,000 and required him to also undertake a "Safer Driving Training Program, ongoing work or study placement to be designed by the Club’s Wellbeing and Education department, and an ongoing Wellbeing Support Program to be designed by the Club’s Wellbeing and Education department".
