= Eliesa Katoa =

Tonga international rugby league footballer

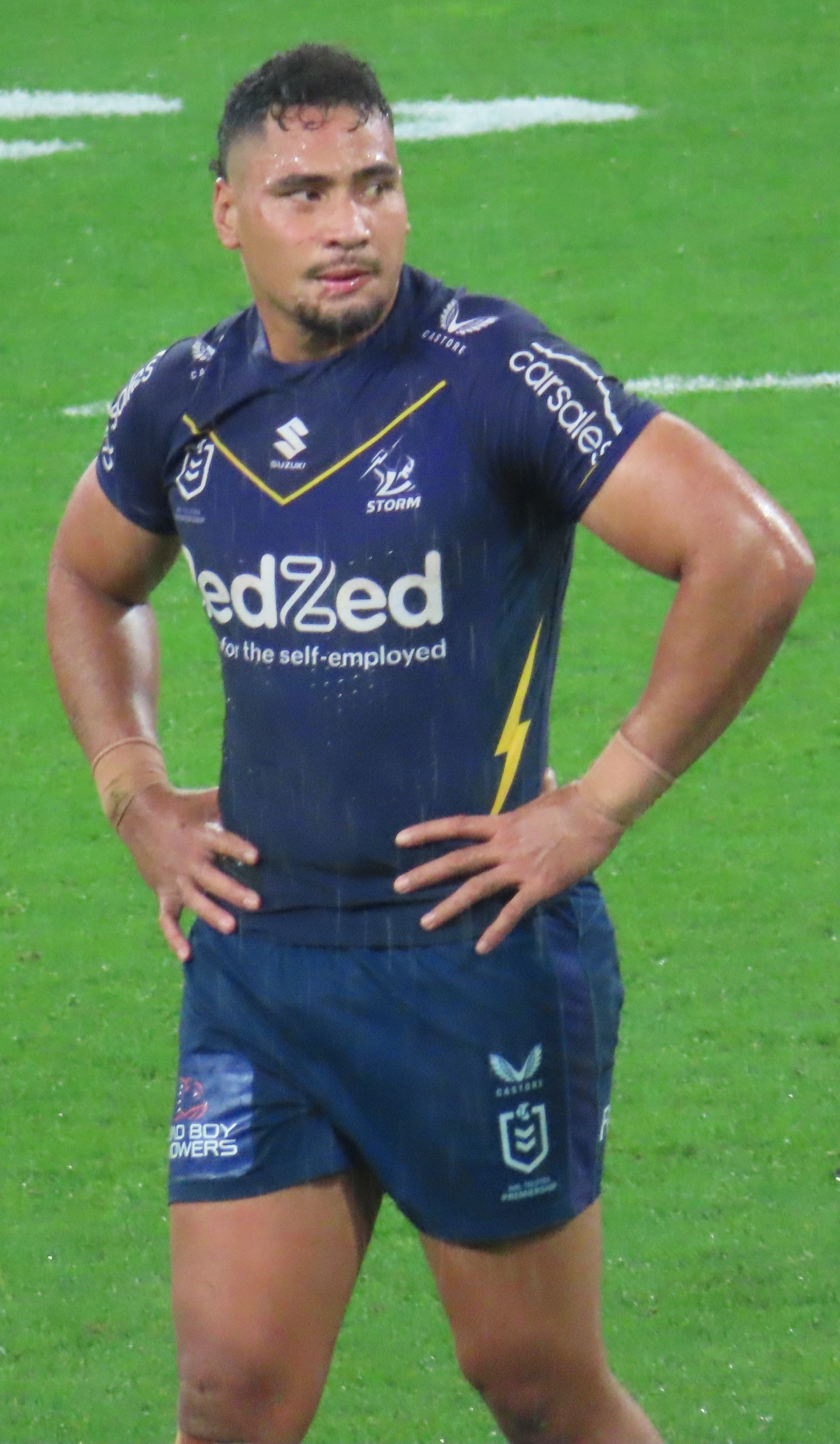

Personal information
- Full name: Eliesa Katoa
- Born: 3 January 2000 (age 26) Koulo, Ha'apai, Tonga
- Height: 193 cm (6 ft 4 in)
- Weight: 110 kg (17 st 5 lb)

Playing information
- Position: Second-row
Club
Years	Team	Pld	T	G	FG	P
2020–22	New Zealand Warriors	46	10	0	0	40
2023–	Melbourne Storm	72	32	0	0	128
	Total	118	42	0	0	168
Representative
Years	Team	Pld	T	G	FG	P
2023–	Tonga	7	2	0	0	8
- Source: As of 2 November 2025

Eliesa Katoa (born 3 January 2000) is a Tongan professional rugby league footballer who plays as a second-row forward for the Melbourne Storm in the National Rugby League and Tonga at international level.

== Early life ==
Katoa was born and raised in the village of Koulo in the Ha'apai group of islands of Tonga, he then moved to New Zealand to take up a scholarship at Tamaki College, Auckland in 2017 playing rugby union. He was then signed by the New Zealand Warriors.

== Playing career ==
Katoa made his NRL debut in round 1 of the 2020 NRL season for the New Zealand Warriors against Newcastle Knights starting from the bench, in the club's 20–0 loss. He had only played 13 games of rugby league in his life before making his debut.

Katoa scored his first try in the Warriors' 18–0 win over the St. George Illawarra Dragons in round 3 of the 2020 season. Katoa was one of a few Warriors players who were initially not allowed to travel back to New Zealand during the height of the COVID-19 pandemic in 2020.

He was released from his Warriors contract in 2022 to join the Melbourne Storm in 2023 on a two-year contract.

After impressing during the 2023 NRL preseason challenge, Katoa made his Melbourne Storm debut against the Parramatta Eels in round 1 of the 2023 NRL season, and was presented with his debut jersey (cap 226). He would play his 50th NRL match in round 4 of the 2023 season. Katoa played 21 games for Melbourne in the 2023 NRL season as the club finished third on the table. Katoa played in Melbourne's preliminary final loss against Penrith. Katoa played a total of 25 matches for Melbourne in the 2024 NRL season as the club were runaway minor premiers. Katoa played in Melbourne's 2024 NRL Grand Final loss against Penrith. Katoa played 26 games for Melbourne in the 2025 NRL season including their 26-22 2025 NRL Grand Final loss against Brisbane.

On 18 November 2025, following his return to Melbourne from an Auckland Hospital after recovering from his surgery, Katoa was officially ruled out for the entire 2026 season. Storm CEO Justin Rodski confirmed that Katoa would continue his recovery at home and would take no part in pre-season training or the entire 2026 season. On 30 November 2025, Katoa released a statement via his social media saying he 'will be back' on the field in the future and he was recovering well. On 7 January 2026 two months after his surgery, Katoa was seen with the Storm training group running with the team during a pre season session, Storm director of football Frank Ponissi reiterated that Katoa had been ruled out for the 2026 season, but was allowed to join the group for training.

== Rep career ==
On 2 November 2025 during Tonga's match against New Zealand, Katoa was taken from the field during warm up after being concussed by fellow team mate Lehi Hopoate, Katoa then suffered two more head injuries while playing before he was taken off the field after the third injury. He was stretchered off the field with oxygen and was rushed to hospital, it was later revealed that he underwent surgery after suffering a seizure due to a bleed on the brain, the NRL is set to launch an investigation on any HIA breaches. On 5 November 2025, Katoa's family provided an update for him saying that he was in a stable condition and no longer in the ICU, Katoa is expected to make a full but lengthy recovery. In December 2025, following the investigation into Katoa's injury it found that three members of the Tongan medical team had breaches in concussion protocols, miscommunication and a rule breach. Those three members of the medical team would be banned from the being in or around the NRL and ARLC for two years, Tonga's head doctor, assistant doctor and head trainer were issued with notices.

== Statistics ==
Year	Team	Games	Tries	Pts
2020	New Zealand Warriors	13	6	24
2021	New Zealand Warriors	18	1	4
2022	New Zealand Warriors	15	3	12
2023	Melbourne Storm	21	6	24
2024	Melbourne Storm	25	12	48
2025	Melbourne Storm	26	14	56
	Totals	118	42	168
