= Jordan Riki =

NZ international rugby league player

Personal information
- Full name: Jordan Riki-Leigh
- Born: 18 January 2000 (age 26) Raglan, Waikato, New Zealand
- Height: 190 cm (6 ft 3 in)
- Weight: 105 kg (16 st 7 lb)

Playing information
- Position: Second-row
Club
| Years | Team | Pld | T | G | FG | P |
|---|---|---|---|---|---|---|
| 2020– | Brisbane Broncos | 135 | 25 | 0 | 0 | 100 |
Representative
| Years | Team | Pld | T | G | FG | P |
| 2020–25 | Māori All Stars | 4 | 2 | 0 | 0 | 8 |
| 2024 | New Zealand | 1 | 0 | 0 | 0 | 0 |
- Source: As of 3 September 2026

Jordan Riki (born 18 January 2000) is a New Zealand rugby league footballer who plays as a second-row forward for the Brisbane Broncos, with whom he won the 2025 NRL Grand Final.

== Background ==
Riki (Jordan Leigh) is of Māori & Indigenous Australian descent and was born in Raglan, New Zealand, however, he grew up in Christchurch. He was educated at St Thomas of Canterbury College. He played his junior football for the Hornby Panthers.

== Career ==
=== 2020 ===
Prior to the season, Riki represented the Maori All Stars in their 30-16 victory over the Indigenous All Stars. Riki made his first grade debut in round 14 of the 2020 NRL season for Brisbane against the Canberra Raiders.

Jordan Riki scored his first career try in round 17 of the 2020 NRL season running 40m dummying Panthers fullback Dylan Edwards during a loss against the Penrith Panthers. After the match, Broncos head coach Peter Gentle told the reporters that Riki could be the long term replacement at Red Hill for the outgoing star forward David Fifita.

Riki made five appearances for Brisbane in his debut season as Brisbane finished last on the table and claimed their first wooden spoon.

=== 2021 ===
Riki represented the Maori All Stars in a 10 all draw against the Indigenous All Stars, scoring the first try of the game in the 49th minute. On 23 March, Riki re-signed with the Brisbane Broncos on a three-year deal till the end of 2024. In round 10 of the 2021 NRL season, Riki was sent to the sin bin during Brisbane's 50-6 loss against Manly-Warringah. Riki was also placed on report for a crusher tackle incident during the game. In Round 20 of the 2021 NRL season, Riki played his best game in his career so far in Brisbane's 37-18 win over arch rivals North Queensland Cowboys. Riki scored a try, set up a try for Brodie Croft and made five tackle breaks in the win.

=== 2022 ===
Riki played a total of 22 games for Brisbane in the 2022 NRL season scoring four tries. Brisbane would finish the season in 9th place on the table.

=== 2023 ===
Riki played a total of 22 games for Brisbane in the 2023 NRL season. Riki played in Brisbane's 26-24 loss against Penrith in the 2023 NRL Grand Final.

=== 2024 ===
Riki played 22 matches for Brisbane in the 2024 NRL season which saw the club miss the finals finishing 12th on the table. On 27 October, Riki made his test debut for New Zealand in the 2024 Rugby League Pacific Championships against Australia in a 22-10 loss, in his hometown of Christchurch.

=== 2025 ===
Riki played 24 games for Brisbane in the 2025 NRL season including the clubs 26-22 victory over Melbourne in the 2025 NRL Grand Final, where he intercepted an attempted 80th minute last-ditch effort pass from Melbourne second-rower Eliesa Katoa, ending the match and securing Brisbane's victory.

=== 2026 ===
On 19 February, Riki played in Brisbane's World Club Challenge loss against Hull Kingston Rovers. Riki played 22 matches for Brisbane in the 2026 NRL season as the club finished 14th on the table.

== Honours ==
Individual

- Maori All-Star (x4): 2020, 2021, 2023, 2025

Brisbane Broncos

- NRL Grand Final Runners-up: 2023
- NRL Grand Final Premiership winners: 2025

== Statistics ==
=== Club ===
| Season | Team | Matches | Tries | Points |
|---|---|---|---|---|
| 2020 | Brisbane | 5 | 1 | 4 |
| 2021 | Brisbane | 18 | 3 | 12 |
| 2022 | Brisbane | 22 | 4 | 16 |
| 2023 | Brisbane | 22 | 7 | 28 |
| 2024 | Brisbane | 22 | 3 | 12 |
| 2025 | Brisbane | 24 | 2 | 8 |
| 2026 | Brisbane | 22 | 5 | 20 |
| Career totals | | 135 | 25 | 100 |

== Controversy ==
In September 2021, Riki was involved in a fight with teammate Thomas Flegler after a night out during Brisbane's mad monday celebrations. It was reported that Riki received a cut on his face over the incident.
