= WOW Sight & Sound =

Australian audio visual retailer

- Type: Private
- Industry: Online Retail
- Founded: 2003
- Founder: Sam Savvas; Sotiris Sotiris
- Defunct: 2019
- Fate: Liquidation (retail stores)
- Headquarters: Brisbane, Queensland, Australia
- Products: Consumer electronics, Video Games, Movies
- Number of employees: 500 (2012)
- Website: www.wowsightandsound.com.au

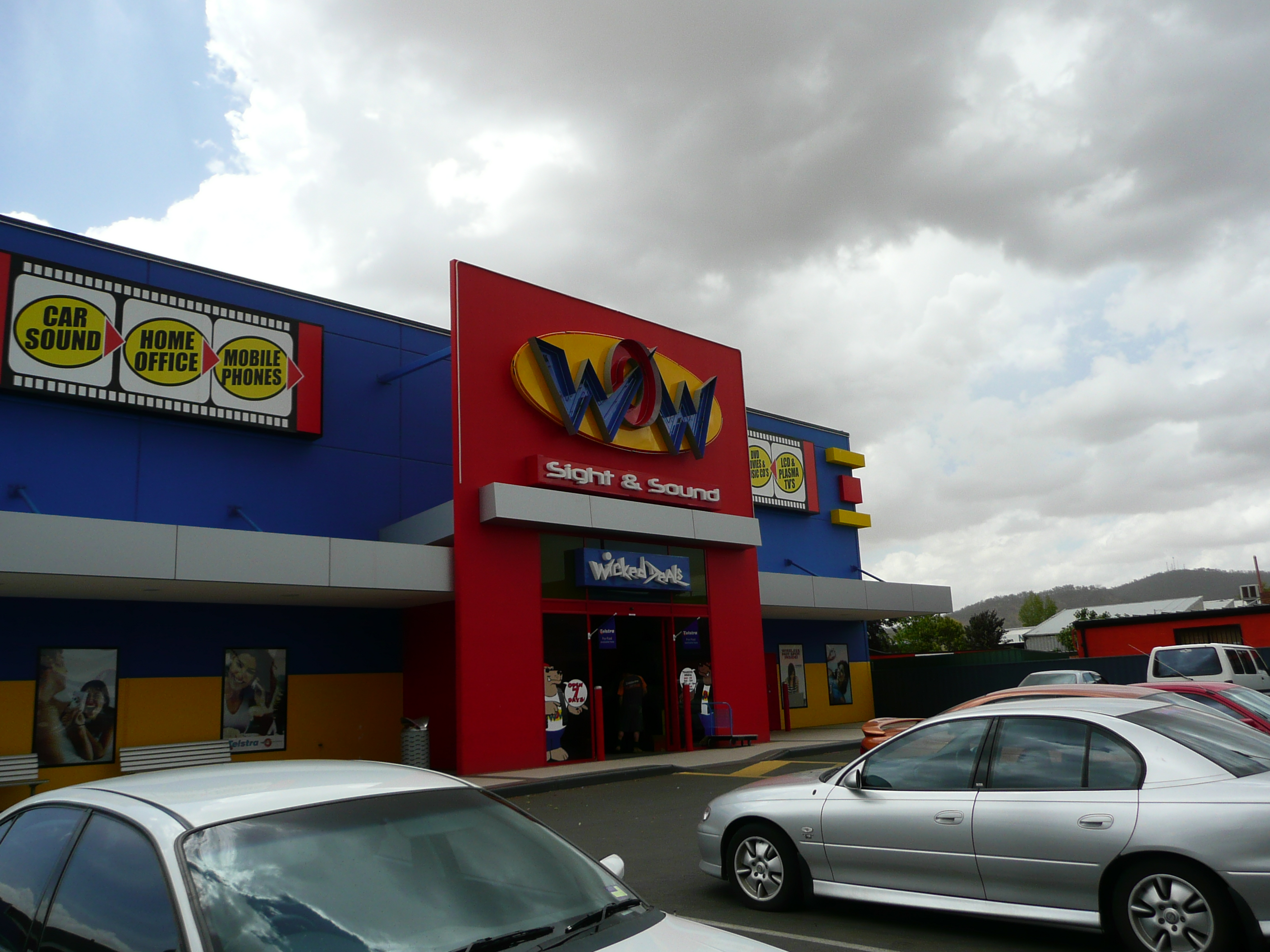
WOW Sight & Sound, Lavington, New South Wales

WOW Sight and Sound was an Australian audio visual retailer. Founded in 2003 with a single store in Townsville, it grew to 15 stores in Queensland, New South Wales, Victoria, the Northern Territory, and the Australian Capital Territory.

The stores sold a wide range of electronic equipment including televisions and set-top boxes, portable media players, mobile phones, car audio, navigations systems and CB radios, accessories. A range of consumer electronics products were sold under the "Vue and Nashi" house brand. WOW Sight & Sound at one point was also a Ticketek reseller.

It also sold a range of DVDs, video game consoles, video games and music CDs. In 2008, WOW launched an online store where most products sold at storefront were available to be purchased online.

In February 2012, the company was placed in administration by the National Australia Bank. The company had experienced a 7.7% decline in revenue in 2011 and was owed $20 m by failed property development investment company Aristicon. Having been unable to find a buyer, in March 2012 receivers-and-managers Ferrier Hodgson closed all 15 stores.

In June 2012, WOW became an online-only retailer after the name WOW Sight and Sound was purchased from the administrators by an entity not related to the original company or owners Sam Savvas and Sotiris Sotiris.

In July 2014, WOW Sight & Sound name was re-launched as an online store by the new owner of the name. The store consisted of three websites offering customers a single checkout across all three stores.

The new company ceased operations in March 2019.

== Sponsorships ==
WOW Sight & Sound was involved in the Supercars Championship, being a naming rights sponsor of Team Dynamik in 2005, WPS Racing in 2006 and 2007 and Brad Jones Racing in 2008 and 2009.

In 2008, WOW Sight & Sound became naming rights sponsor of the Brisbane Broncos. they also sponsored the Brisbane Roar and Australia Zoo
