= Brisbane Broncos =

Australian rugby league football club

Club information
- Full name: Brisbane Broncos Limited
- Nickname(s): Broncos, Bronx,Bronx Nation
- Short name: BRI
- Colours: Maroon; Gold
- Founded: April 1987; 39 years ago
- Website: broncos.com.au

Current details
- Ground: Lang Park (52,500)
- CEO: Dave Donaghy
- Chairman: Karl Morris
- Coach: Michael Maguire (NRL); Scott Prince (NRLW)
- Manager: Troy Thomson (NRL); Paul Dyer (NRLW)
- Captain: Adam Reynolds (NRL); Ali Brigginshaw & Tamika Upton (NRLW)
- Competition: National Rugby League; NRL Women's Premiership
- 2026 NRL season 2025 NRLW season: 14th 2nd (Premiers)
- Current season

Uniforms
Home colours	Away colours

Records
- Premierships: 7 (1992, 1993, 1997 (SL), 1998, 2000, 2006, 2025)
- Runners-up: 2 (2015, 2023)
- Minor premierships: 4 (1992, 1997 (SL), 1998, 2000)
- NRL Nines runner up: 1 (2014)
- World Club Challenge: 2 (1992, 1997)
- NSW Cup: 1 (1990)
- Wooden spoons: 1 (2020)
- Most capped: 355 – Darren Lockyer
- Highest try scorer: 142 – Steve Renouf
- Highest points scorer: 1,328 – Corey Parker

The Brisbane Broncos are an Australian professional rugby league football club based in Red Hill, a suburb of Brisbane, Queensland. Founded in April 1987, the Broncos compete in the National Rugby League (NRL) and play their home games at Lang Park in nearby Milton.

The club has won seven premierships, including two New South Wales Rugby League premierships, a Super League premiership and four NRL premierships. The Broncos have also won two World Club Challenges and four minor premierships in multiple competitions. In 2024 it reportedly had more members than any other NRL club with 53,672.

The club was founded in April 1987 as part of the Winfield Cup's national expansion, becoming, along with the Gold Coast-Tweed Giants, one of Queensland's first two participants in the New South Wales Rugby League premiership. The Broncos later became the dominant force in the competition before playing a significant role in the Super League War of the mid-1990s, then continuing to compete successfully in the newly created National Rugby League competition. Trading as Brisbane Broncos Limited (ASX: BBL), it is the only publicly listed sports club on the Australian Securities Exchange.

In 2024, the Brisbane Broncos rugby league club had over 1 million fans. Their most recent premiership was their seventh, in the 2025 NRL season.

== History ==
=== Beginnings (1988–1991) ===
A Brisbane license was the Queensland Rugby League's direct response to the threat posed by the VFL's (now AFL) expansion team the Brisbane Bears which was granted a license in 1986 for entry in the 1987 season. Soon after the granting of the license, QRL officials mobilized, seeking a NSWRL franchise and rich backers. The aim of QRL general manager Ross Livermore was specifically to stifle the VFL's publicity and promotions in the state.

The QRL's bid was bolstered by Queensland's success in the 1980s, the early years of the State of Origin series between Queensland and New South Wales, in addition to the inclusion of a combined Brisbane Rugby League team in the mid-week competition, convinced the New South Wales Rugby League (NSWRL) to invite a Queensland-based team into the competition. After tough competition between the various syndicates for the Brisbane licence, the QRL chose the bid of former Brisbane Rugby League (BRL) players, Barry Maranta and Paul Morgan. At the first meeting with the NSWRL hierarchy, the newly formed Brisbane Broncos were asked to pay a $500,000 fee.

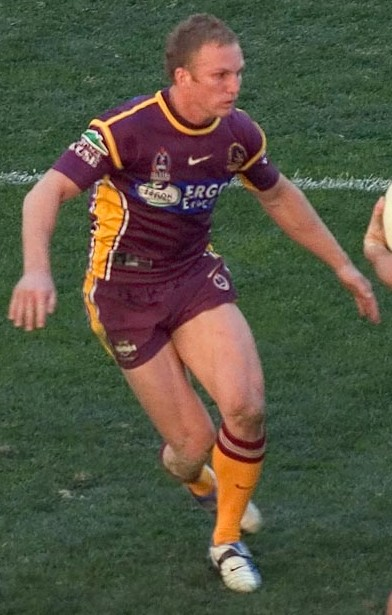
Darren Lockyer playing for the Broncos in 2004. Lockyer made his Broncos debut in 1995 and is a former captain of the Brisbane Broncos.

The Broncos secured the services of Australia national rugby league team captain Wally Lewis to be the inaugural club captain and former BRL and then Canberra Raiders coach Wayne Bennett, on top of a host of other talented players including Chris Johns, Allan Langer, Terry Matterson, Gene Miles and Kerrod Walters. The team made their debut in the NSWRL's 1988 Winfield Cup premiership against reigning premiers, the Manly-Warringah Sea Eagles, and defeated them 44–10. They sat inside the Top 4 for a majority of the season, even sitting in 1st for 3 weeks. But the competition race was so tight, a 16–4 loss to the South Sydney Rabbitohs in Round 14 was enough to drop them from 2nd to 6th. Brisbane would not return to the Top 5, and a 20–10 loss to eventual runners up Balmain Tigers denied them the chance to enter a playoff for 5th place. Leading into 1989, Brisbane recruited Sam Backo from the Raiders while Steve Renouf was given his first grade debut. In their second season they won the mid-week knockout competition, the 1989 Panasonic Cup, but their league performance again revolved around a midseason slump, this time a 5-game losing streak which dropped them from 2nd to 7th. Brisbane would recover to enter a playoff for the 5th and final spot in the finals, but lost 38–14 to the Cronulla Sharks, ending their season.

Leading up to the 1990 season, Brisbane recruited Kevin Walters from Canberra. However, the biggest news was the decision of Bennett to remove Lewis as club captain on the basis that he wasn't a good trainer or teammate, with Miles resuming the captaincy of the side. While the move was controversial, it seemed to have the desired effect, as the Broncos finished the season in 2nd, qualifying for their maiden finals series. Their finals debut was an upset 26–16 loss to the Penrith Panthers in the major Preliminary Semi, before they beat Manly 12–4 in the Minor Semi to qualify for a Preliminary Final showdown with Canberra. With a spot in the Grand Final on the line, Brisbane collapsed in sensational fashion at the Sydney Football Stadium (SFS), losing 32–4. Lewis, still upset about Bennett's treatment of his captaincy, left the club to go to the Gold Coast. He was replaced by Trevor Gillmeister, who joined from the Eastern Suburbs Roosters. Unfortunately, Brisbane endured their worst season to date in 1991, spending just 2 weeks total inside the Top 5 and hovering around 10th for much of the year before a 5-game winning streak saw them finish 7th, just a solitary draw outside a playoff for 5th place.

=== The Golden Age and Super League (1992–1997) ===
Leading up to 1992, Brisbane landed another major piece from the Raiders, premiership winning prop Glenn Lazarus. The retirement of Miles saw Langer appointed club captain. Despite the new captain, 1992 was by far their best season yet, never sitting below 4th on the ladder and finishing the season with the minor premiership. The Illawarra Steelers met them in the Major Semi-final, where Brisbane took a 22–12 win to go into the first Grand Final in club history. 14 days later, they met the St George Dragons at the SFS. After a cagey first half which saw Brisbane lead 8–6 at the break, the Broncos dominated the second 40 minutes, with Langer and backrower Allan Cann crossing for 2 tries each in a 28–8 victory. Langer was named Clive Churchill Medallist for his phenomenal performance.

Chart of yearly table positions for Brisbane Broncos in First Grade Rugby League

Brisbane's Premiership defence in 1993 got off to a slow start, but they would recover to return to contention for the minor premiership. On the last round of the season, Brisbane took on St George, needing a win to keep their minor premiership hopes alive. St George won 16–10, and wins to Manly and the Canterbury-Bankstown Bulldogs saw Brisbane drop from 2nd all the way to 5th, plunging them into sudden death football, all matches being played in Sydney. They ended Manly's season with a dominant 36–10 win, then took on a Canberra side whose form had plummeted following a broken leg to superstar halfback Ricky Stuart, and Brisbane cast them aside 30–12. Brisbane then met minor premiers Canterbury for a spot in the Grand Final, and their season looked on tenterhooks as the Bulldogs took a 16–10 halftime lead. But Brisbane steeled and won 23–16, and set up a Grand Final rematch with the Dragons. No team had ever won the NSWRL from 5th, however Brisbane became the first to do so when they won a defensive dogfight 14–6, winning back to back premierships, the last team to do so in a unified comp until the Roosters in 2018–19. During that season, they also handed future dual-international winger Wendell Sailor his first grade debut.

1994 was a tough year for Brisbane, they didn't reach the Top 5 until round 8 before dropping out and not returning until Round 17, ultimately finishing 5th. Brisbane again ended Manly's season in the first week of the finals, this time 16–4, but they could not repeat the magic of '93, with a Jason Taylor field goal ending their season in a heart breaking 15–14 loss to the North Sydney Bears. In 1995, the Super League War broke out. After threats of expulsion from the NSWRL, the Broncos were one of the last clubs to sign with the new league and all players followed suit (The Canberra Raiders, Canterbury Bulldogs and Cronulla Sharks were the first to sign, and it was only revealed many years later that the Broncos were in fact one of the last clubs to sign for either competition). Broncos CEO John Ribot moved to take over the running of the rebel Super League, leading to a perception that the conflict was orchestrated by the club. The 1995 season, the first under the ARL banner, went pretty well for Brisbane- they sat in the Top 4 for most of the year, finished 3rd, and unearthed a pair of future club legends- rugged prop Shane Webcke and future Golden Boot winner Darren Lockyer. Unfortunately, Brisbane couldn't capitalise in the first 8-team finals series, losing to the Raiders 14–8 in the qualifying final before falling 24–10 to the eventual Premiers, the now-Sydney Bulldogs. 1996 went pretty similarly- sit comfortably in the Top 4 and ultimately finish 2nd, only to lose 21–16 to North Sydney and 22–16 to the Cronulla Sharks to end their season.

Brisbane's decision to side with the Super League saw a host of players join them from the ARL- most notably St George pair Anthony Mundine and Gorden Tallis, which offset the departure of longtime hooker Kerrod Walters to the Adelaide Rams. Brisbane dominated the Super League season, never leaving 1st position after Round 5 and beating Cronulla 34–2 and then 2 weeks later 26–8 to win the title in convincing fashion. Brisbane also competed in the World Club Challenge, going undefeated in their group (including a 76–0 demolition of Halifax Blue Sox), before beating St Helens 66–12, the Auckland Warriors 22–16 and the Hunter Mariners 36–12 to win the only edition of the costly tournament.

=== Unified competition, sixth premiership (1998–2006) ===
Brisbane entered the 1998 NRL season as one of the favorites to win the unified competition- despite the return of Mundine to the Dragons and the departure of Lazarus to become the inaugural captain of the newly formed Melbourne Storm. Despite a rocky period which saw them drop to 6th after 14 rounds, Brisbane stormed home on a 12-game unbeaten run to seal the minor premiership. They were also able to fill the hole of Lazarus by debuting Petero Civoniceva.Despite this form however, they were stunned 15–10 by the Parramatta Eels in their first finals match, meaning they would need an extra game to qualify for the Grand Final. They responded in typical Brisbane style- routing Melbourne and Sydney City (formerly Eastern Suburbs) 30–6 and 46–18 respectively to qualify for the big dance, where they ended Canterbury's dream finals run with a 38–12 victory. The rampaging Tallis was named Clive Churchill Medallist after a dominant performance in the middle of the park, including a try from dummy half.

1999 was disappointing for the club with a terrible early-season form hindering their attempt at a third consecutive premiership losing 8 of their first 10 matches. Club legend Langer retired mid-season, with Kevin Walters taking over the captaincy. The club went on another 12 game unbeaten run and ultimately qualified for the finals in 8th position, however their season ended in a dominant 42–20 loss against minor premiers Cronulla. The season wasn't all negative, as future Queensland representatives Dane Carlaw, Lote Tuqiri and Chris Walker all made first grade debuts for the club, although club legend Renouf did leave to finish his career with the Wigan Warriors. But Brisbane responded with a dominant 2000 season, buoyed by the signing of Ben Ikin to fill the hole left by Langer. Brisbane dominated the regular season, running away with the minor premiership, before beating the Sharks 34–20 and the Eels 16–10 to book a Grand Final matchup with the Roosters. The Broncos ground out a 14–6 victory for their 5th title in 9 years, with Lockyer receiving the Clive Churchill Medal for his performance. 2000 also saw the debut of even more future representative players- Ashley Harrison, Justin Hodges, Brad Meyers and Carl Webb. After just one full season as captain, Walters retired (although he would have a 5-game comeback in 2001), with Tallis anointed as club captain, and young North Queensland Cowboys half Scott Prince was brought in as his replacement

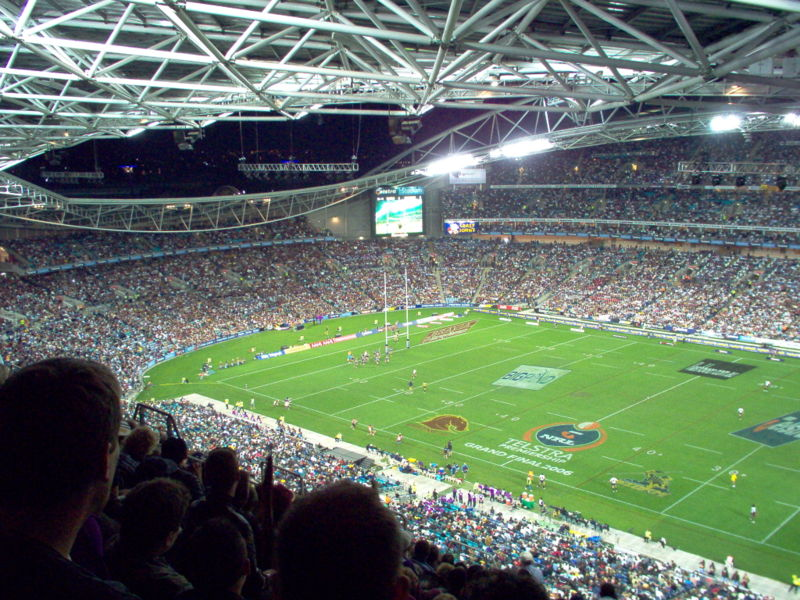
The 2006 Grand final at Stadium Australia.

2001 saw the beginning of the Broncos "Post-Origin Slump", a succession of losing streaks after Origin which sees Brisbane slide down the ladder and disappoint in the finals. In Round 19, Brisbane sat 2nd on the ladder, before losing 6 straight matches and finishing the year in 5th place. They fell 22–6 to Cronulla in the Qualifying Final, before beating the now-merged St George-Illawarra Dragons 44–28 to secure a Preliminary Final berth, where they were defeated 24–16 by minor premiers Parramatta. The year saw the debut of 2 more future stars- the speedy Brent Tate as well as goal kicking forward Corey Parker. A brutal knee injury suffered by Ikin would sideline him for all of 2002, and while a neck injury to Tallis threatened to end his career, he would return at the start of the next season. Sailor would also leave the club, enticed by a massive offer from the Queensland Reds to switch codes. Hodges also left the club, the offer of guaranteed gametime from the Roosters too much for him to ignore. After joining the Warrington Wolves and making a stunning comeback to the Queensland squad, Langer returned to the club for one last season in 2002 to help ease their halves problem. Brisbane finished the year in 3rd position, although they were challenging for the minor premiership until they lost 4 of their last 5 matches. Brisbane eliminated Parramatta with a 24–14 win, but fell in the Preliminary Final for the second year in a row, losing 16–12 to the eventual premiers, the Roosters. 2002 also saw one of the greatest moments in Brisbane's club history- in a Round 12 clash with the Wests Tigers, missing 15 regular first graders as well as head coach Bennett due to injuries and Origin, a Broncos squad captained by Shane Walker and coached by assistant Craig Bellamy pulled off a stunning 28–14 victory. Just a year after Sailor went to Rugby Union, his former wing partner Tuqiri joined him, joining the New South Wales Waratahs. Wing partner Chris Walker also jumped ship, heading to the South Sydney Rabbitohs on a big contract.

2003 saw one of the worst "Post-Origin Slumps" in club history. The club sat 1st as late as Round 17, and were comfortably positioned 3rd after 19 weeks before both Tallis and Lockyer were felled by injuries in the Round 19 win over Melbourne. Brisbane dropped their last 7 matches, even after the return of their 2 superstar for the last 2 weeks of the season, and dropped to 8th place on the ladder- their season ending in the Qualifying Final when minor premiers and eventual premiers Penrith reversed an 18–10 half time deficit to beat Brisbane 28–18. That year did see the debuts of Neville Costigan and Sam Thaiday. Meanwhile, Prince had struggled to find game time after 2001 and left for the Tigers, where he would win the 2005 Clive Churchill medal and captain the side to premiership glory in one of the biggest "Ones that Got Away" for the Broncos. The club again had a bounceback year in 2004, with the shock move of Lockyer from fullback to five-eighth a major catalyst for their success. Of course, it helped that his replacement at fullback, 17 year old sensation Karmichael Hunt, was able to fit straight into the Broncos side. Brisbane spent almost the entire season inside the Top 4 and finished in 3rd position, but were stunned 31–14 by Melbourne, who had Bellamy as their head coach. This set them up with a sudden death semi final against the Cowboys, who they were undefeated against leading into the match. Brisbane volunteered to move the match from Stadium Australia to Willows Sports Complex, and the Cowboys responded by using their raucous home support to stun their "Big Brothers" 10–0. The match would be the last for a host of club icons- captain Tallis and Ikin both retired, their NSW representative goal kicking winger Michael De Vere (Huddersfield Giants) and Queensland prop Meyers (Bradford Bulls) left for the English Super League, while their other Origin prop Webb joined the Cowboys. With Lockyer named club captain and Hodges returning to the club, Brisbane dominated the start of the 2005 season and sat in 1st position after 24 rounds, but 5 straight losses to end the season saw them again slide to 3rd, where they again lost in the opening week to Melbourne, this time 24–18. This sent them into another semi final, this time against Prince and the eventual premiers Tigers, who brushed the Broncos aside 34–6.

Leading into 2006, Brisbane were able to retain a similar squad to 2005. Ben Hannant proved to be a key rotational piece after arriving from the Roosters, Darius Boyd made his first grade debut and would be a key part of Brisbane's backline, and longtime Queensland Cup veteran Shane Perry would become the solution for Brisbane's halfback spot. After being inside the Top 2 after Round 17, the Broncos again entered the post-Origin slump, losing 5 consecutive games. This season however, they reversed this run of form, winning 5 straight games to close out the regular season in 3rd. This had come after Bennett had signed a secret deal to become the Roosters coach from 2007, but reneged on the deal after it became public. Despite the reverse in form, it looked like their finals success was going on par with previous seasons after they fell 20–4 against the Dragons in the qualifying final. But Brisbane got a break against an injury hit Knights squad, and Brisbane took a crushing 50–6 victory to qualify for their first Preliminary Final in 4 seasons. Brisbane took on the Bulldogs, and their season was on life support when Canterbury led 20–6 at half time. The lead prompted Bulldogs prop Willie Mason to exclaim “We're going to the grand final!”. That sledge sparked a dramatic Broncos comeback, as they ran in a 31–0 second half to blitz the Bulldogs 37–20 and book a spot in the Grand Final against Melbourne. Despite being massive underdogs, Brisbane looked in control throughout the entire match, and a Darren Lockyer field goal sealed a dramatic 15–8 victory and Brisbane's 6th premiership. Unsung hooker Shaun Berrigan was awarded the Clive Churchill Medal for his aggressive performance in the ruck. Webcke had already announced his intention to retire, and did so as a champion.

=== Bennett's final years (2007–2008) ===
Once again, Brisbane started a premiership defence poorly, losing 7 of their first 10 to sit 15th, but their stay at the bottom of the table was abruptly ended when they produced a club record 71–6 victory over a battered Knights side. Brisbane climbed back up the ladder to sit 5th after Origin, but their season again took a turn in a Round 18 clash with the Cowboys, when Lockyer's season abruptly ended with a torn ACL. Brisbane would lose 5 of their last 7 matches, including a 68–22 thrashing at the hands of the Eels, and would end the season in 8th place and being thrashed 40–0 by the Storm in the Qualifying Final. Civoniceva left the club for Penrith, upset that they had prioritised the signing of Panthers prop Joel Clinton over retaining him. Tate also departed for the Warriors, while Berrigan left for Hull FC. In their place came Clinton, Eels hooker PJ Marsh and another ex-Panther, Peter Wallace, who would replace the ageing Perry as Lockyer's halves partner.

Lockyer, however, missed some serious game time in 2008 and wasn't 100% healthy until Round 18, at which point Brisbane sat 7th on the ladder. But the bigger news to come out of the start of that season was Bennett's decision to walk out of the final year of his contract to become the head coach of the Dragons from 2009. Bennett had seen his relationship with the Broncos board deteriorate after his courtship with the Roosters, and decided to leave after 21 seasons with the club. His former assistant Bellamy seemed set for a return to Brisbane as his replacement, only to blindside the club by re-signing with the Storm after a botched interview. Ultimately, it was decided that longtime assistant Ivan Henjak would be promoted to the head coaching role from 2009, and he began taking more of a role in training. With Lockyer returning, Brisbane won 6 of their final 9 games to finish 5th, and upset the Roosters 24–16 in the qualifying final to set up a semi final showdown with Bellamy and the Storm. Brisbane led 14–12 with under 10 minutes to go, and seemed to have won the game when Hannant crossed the line, with Bennett seen displaying a rare show of emotion. But the video referee deemed Hannant was held up, and a few minutes later an Ashton Sims knock on saw Greg Inglis score for the Storm to seal a late 16–14 victory, breaking Brisbane hearts and ending their season.

=== Rebuilding (2009–2014) ===
2009 saw a wave of change around Red Hill- not only was there a new head coach, but a host of roster changes. Boyd joined Bennett at the Dragons, the representative foursome of Hannant, Greg Eastwood, Michael Ennis and David Stagg all joined the Bulldogs, and boom winger Denan Kemp, who tied the club record with 4 tries in a single game against the Eels, was lured away to the Warriors. In their place was boom teenager Israel Folau, young back rower Ben Te'o and a host of club-developed talent, including Gerard Beale, Alex Glenn, Josh McGuire, Andrew McCullough and Jharal Yow Yeh. Brisbane sat Top 4 until the Origin period, when they collapsed, conceding 40+ points in 3 straight games, an extra 44–12 loss to South Sydney and a then-club record 56–0 thrashing at the hands of the Raiders, leaving them dangling in 10th position. But 5 straight wins to close out the season, including a 22–10 win over Canberra just 36 days later, saw them finish in 6th position. This revival was largely due to the emergence of rampaging forward Dave Taylor. The Broncos stunned the 3rd place Titans 40–32 in the qualifying final, setting up a showdown with Bennett's Dragons in a sudden death semi final. Brisbane took one up on their former mentor with a dominant 24–10 victory, however Wallace fractured his ankle in the win, leaving them without a recognised halfback ahead of their preliminary final matchup with the Storm, one of the bigger reasons they fell 40–10.

2010 saw significant roster changes: the injury-enforced retirement of Marsh, Taylor's decision to move to the Rabbitohs and Karmichael Hunt's decision to switch to the AFL with the Gold Coast Suns. Furthermore, they received a massive blow during pre-season when Hodges ruptured his achilles, causing him to miss the entire season. Brisbane stuttered and lost 6 of their first 8 matches, before reversing form and entering the Top 8. But in their Round 22 clash with the Cowboys, Lockyer took a hit and injured his rib cartilage. Despite his best efforts, Lockyer missed the rest of the regular season, and without him Brisbane slumped to 4 straight defeats, sliding from 7th to 10th and missing the finals for the first time since 1991. An even bigger blow for Brisbane was a contract saga involving Greg Inglis, who was departing the Melbourne Storm in the wake of their salary cap saga. Inglis had agreed in principle to join the Broncos for 2011 onward, but then decided to cancel a flight to Brisbane to sign the contract under the alibi that "It's raining and I don't think the planes are flying". Behind the scenes, former Bronco Anthony Mundine was convincing Inglis to join the Rabbitohs, which he did a week later. Inglis would've replaced Folau, who followed Hunt's lead in switching to the AFL, this time to the Greater Western Sydney Giants. On a positive note, the season saw the debut of future international Matt Gillett.

In February 2011, it was announced that Henjak was to be sacked from the club, only three weeks before the beginning of the season. Anthony Griffin, Henjak's assistant, took over as coach for the 2011 season, becoming just the third head coach in the history of Broncos. Ben Hannant also returned to the club, but even more pressing was the decision of Lockyer to retire after the season, ending a 16-year playing career which, in Round 22, saw him overtake Terry Lamb and Steve Menzies for the most first grade games played, finishing at 355, a record which would stand until Cameron Smith overtook him in 2017. Brisbane stagnated for a little while, but finished the season in 3rd position, setting up a qualifying finals matchup with the Warriors which they won 40–10, meaning they would head to take on the Dragons once again in the semi-finals. Bennett, who had looked like he was set to rejoin the Broncos in 2012, had announced that he was joining Newcastle at the end of the season- meaning the match would either be the last of Lockyer's career, or Bennett's last with the Dragons. Brisbane led 12–6 towards the end of the game before Lockyer caught Beale's knee in his face, fracturing his cheekbone. St George Illawarra tied the game, necessitating Golden Point, where an injured Lockyer slotted home a field goal to seal a 13–12 win and keep Brisbane in the finals. Unfortunately, Lockyer was unable to play in the Preliminary Final against Manly, which the Sea Eagles won 26–14.

2012 marked the Broncos' 25th season in the NRL competition. Civoniceva returned for one last season, and Thaiday was appointed club captain. The club also lost winger Jharal Yow Yeh in Round 4 to a brutal leg injury, suffering a compound fracture in his leg and an ankle dislocation. Yow Yeh retired in 2014, as he never fully recovered from the injury. Brisbane spent much of the season inside the Top 4, but another "Post-Origin Slide" saw them finish 8th, and they were eliminated by the Cowboys 33–16 in the Qualifying Final. Beale (Dragons) and Te'o (Rabbitohs) both left the club, along with the retiring Civoniceva, and Prince returned to the club for his swansong. Unfortunately, 2013 was not a good year for Brisbane- they were out of the Top 8 after Round 10 and never returned, finishing 12th, the lowest position in club history at the time. Future Origin winger Corey Oates made his debut during this season, however. Prince retired and Wallace returned to the Panthers, largely because of the emergence of Ben Hunt as the club's halfback.

Perhaps one of their biggest signings in quite some time, former Dally M Medallist Ben Barba joined the club in 2014 as their marquee signing. Barba attempted to join the Broncos one year prior, but was refused a release by the Bulldogs. Todd Lowrie, Martin Kennedy and Daniel Vidot also joined the Broncos from the Warriors, Roosters and Dragons respectively. There was also a change in the club captaincy, with Thaiday standing down and being replaced by a co-captain structure of Hodges and Parker.

The Broncos failed to find any sort of consistency during the season, their best patch of form being four straight wins against the Titans, Tigers, Sea Eagles and Raiders. They also experienced their worst collapse as a club against the Cronulla Sharks at home in Round 16, where they led the Sharks 22–0 at one stage, ultimately falling 24–22 by full time. Brisbane never really challenged for the title throughout the season and ultimately finished 8th, again being eliminated by the Cowboys in the Qualifying Final, this time by the score of 32–20. That game would be Griffin's last as head coach, as it had been announced mid-season that Wayne Bennett was set to return to the Broncos from 2015.

=== Bennett's second stint (2015–2018) ===
The roster change under Bennett was dramatic from the moment he returned. Ben Barba was released after just one season, eventually joining Cronulla. Ben Hannant left for the Cowboys, and Kiwi international Josh Hoffman departed for the Gold Coast. In return, Darius Boyd returned to the club, and was joined by ex-Tiger enforcer Adam Blair and boom Raider Anthony Milford, as well as a pair of up and coming rookies in Joe Ofahengaue and Kodi Nikorima making their debuts. The captaincy underwent another change as well, with Hodges given sole captaincy of the club. Their campaign started rocky, a 36–6 thrashing at the hands of South Sydney, but they soon found their feet and won 8 straight matches during the Origin period – a drastic change from the previous years – ultimately finishing the season in 2nd place. They took down the Cowboys 16–12 in the Qualifying Final to advance straight to a Preliminary Final showdown with the minor premier Roosters. A Boyd intercept try inside the first minute set the tone for the clash, and Brisbane would dominate 31–12 to advance to a Grand Final showdown with the Cowboys. In what is considered by some commentators to be one of the best Grand Finals in recent history, the Broncos led 16–12 for much of the second half before Cowboys winger Kyle Feldt scored in the corner on the last play of regulation to tie the match. Superstar half Johnathan Thurston missed the subsequent conversion, sending the clash to golden point. The Broncos won the golden point coin toss and elected to receive, putting them in a great position to win the match. However, off the kickoff, Ben Hunt knocked on, giving the Cowboys possession just metres out from the Broncos line. Thurston kicked a field goal 2 minutes into the Golden Point period to win the match for the Cowboys 17–16, ending the season in jubilation for Townsville and heartbreak for Brisbane.

Justin Hodges retired after the Grand Final, and the captaincy was again given to Corey Parker. James Roberts, a speedy centre, had been lured away from the Titans at the last minute to join the Broncos, and he was joined by young Raiders forward Tevita Pangai Junior and young back rower Jai Arrow, who had emerged from Brisbane's development program. Brisbane started the season strongly but endured a "Post-Origin Slump" to drop out of the Top 4, finishing in 5th. After eliminating the Titans 44–28 in the Qualifying Final, Brisbane travelled to Townsville for a knockout clash with the Cowboys. In another classic between the two sides, the game went into extra time – a new rule brought in after their grand final thriller 12 months earlier. At 20-all, when a Michael Morgan try sealed a 26–20 win for the Cowboys, ending their season – the third time in 5 years their season had concluded in Townsville. Parker retired after the match, but Brisbane brought in embattled ex-New Zealand halfback Benji Marshall on a lifeline deal, as well as established prop Korbin Sims from Newcastle and experienced winger David Mead from the Gold Coast. Darius Boyd was also named club captain for 2017.

Prior to the start of the 2017 season it was announced Hunt had signed a large contract with the Dragons beginning in 2018, and that likely contributed to a season where Hunt was dropped to reserve grade and the bench, before finishing the season at hooker after Andrew McCullough tore his ACL. Brisbane started their 2017 campaign in shaky fashion, winning two of their first five games, the club sitting in ninth position at the end of Round 5. Following this, the Broncos found their form and re-entered the top 8 without exiting it again, finishing the 2017 season in 3rd, but with a 4 win gap between them and the 1st placed Storm. Making matters worse, Boyd was injured in their Round 26 win over the Cowboys, and missed their 24–22 loss in a classic Qualifying Final against the Roosters, before the Boyd-less Broncos advanced to another Preliminary Final with a 13–6 win over the Panthers. Boyd was rushed back into the squad for the showdown with runaway favourites Melbourne, but was clearly not healthy and didn't do much to alter the 30–0 defeat.

Along with Ben Hunt, Jai Arrow, Adam Blair and Benji Marshall also left the club, departing for the Titans, Warriors and Tigers respectively. Jack Bird was the club's marquee signing, joining from Cronulla, although his season lasted just 8 games as he dealt with injury. Wayne Bennett blamed Cronulla for Jack Bird's injury problems, as he had claimed that Cronulla had told Bird that he was not injured and did not require surgery before departing for Brisbane.

The Broncos also had signed prop Matt Lodge on a one-year deal, a move which attracted controversy, as Lodge had been out of the NRL due to his arrest in New York during the 2015 off-season. While many in the media and the NRL fanbase called for Lodge's contract to be deregistered, Bennett and the Broncos stood by Lodge.

2018 also saw a major success from Brisbane's youth, with debuts handed out to Payne Haas, David Fifita, Kotoni Staggs and Jake Turpin. Brisbane, however, were not the team they had been, and instead of being in the Top 4 race, they were just looking to make the finals. A big 48–16 win over Manly, which saw Corey Oates score 4 tries, saw the club finish in 6th, but just one win separated them from 1st, such was the tightness of the competition. The following week, Brisbane were eliminated from the finals series after being defeated 48–18 by a highly unfancied St George-Illawarra side. The loss was also the final game for the retiring Sam Thaiday.

After the 2018 season, a rift emerged between Bennett and CEO Paul White, which ultimately saw Bennett sign with the Rabbitohs to become coach from 2020. Just weeks later, Bennett was sacked as the head coach for making preseason plans with the Rabbitohs for the following year, and in return South Sydney appointed Bennett as head coach with immediate effect, freeing up their coach Anthony Seibold, who had already signed with Brisbane from 2020, to become the Broncos head coach for 2019.

=== Anthony Seibold era (2019–2020) ===
Along with Bennett, a host of key players left Brisbane. Josh McGuire left for North Queensland and Korbin Sims for St. George Illawarra, then halfway through the season, James Roberts, Jaydn Su'A and Kodi Nikorima also departed the club for the Rabbitohs and Warriors. Jack Bird once again dealt with injuries, only playing 9 games, and it quickly became clear that the now 32 year old Darius Boyd had lost a step. The Broncos handed debuts to Patrick Carrigan, Xavier Coates, Tom Dearden, Herbie Farnworth and Keenan Palasia, while also signing Rhys Kennedy and James Segeyaro mid-season. A four match losing streak early in the season set the tone for the club, as they sat 14th after Round 16, only to go on a run of 6 wins and a draw from their last 10 games to ensure they finished in 8th place. They played Parramatta in week one of the finals at the new Bankwest Stadium and lost the match 58–0, marking the club's worst ever defeat. It was also the biggest finals loss in the history of the competition which eclipsed the previous record set by Newtown when they defeated St George 55–7 in the 1944 finals series. It also extended the club's longest ever premiership drought to thirteen seasons. The club signed out of favour half Brodie Croft from the Melbourne Storm on a three-year deal, beginning in 2020.

2020 started well for Brisbane, winning their first two games against North Queensland and South Sydney, before the competition was suspended upon completion of round 2 due to the impact of the COVID-19 pandemic. When the competition returned from its unscheduled hiatus in late May, the optimism at the Broncos fizzled out quickly, as they lost 34–6 to Parramatta in the first game of the season restart. The club then recorded their worst ever loss the following week against the Sydney Roosters, losing 59–0. The losses continued to pile up for Brisbane, the mid-season signing of Issac Luke and the return of Ben Te'o making almost no impact. The Broncos were also impacted by injuries, as many players missed more than half of the shortened season.

The club's only post COVID lockdown victory came against fellow bottom of the ladder team, Canterbury-Bankstown in round 9. After a 28–10 loss to South Sydney, Anthony Seibold resigned as coach of the Brisbane Broncos, with assistant Peter Gentle taking over as caretaker coach until the end of the season.

While the Brisbane club were more competitive under Gentle, the club would lose their final 11 matches of the season in a row including a 36–8 loss to the Canberra Raiders despite leading 8–6 at half time, another big loss against the Sydney Roosters, this time 58–12 at the Sydney Cricket Ground and a 32–16 loss in the final round to North Queensland which condemned Brisbane to the club's first ever wooden spoon after Canterbury-Bankstown beat Souths in round 19 to leap ahead of the Brisbane club on the ladder on points differential. Darius Boyd and Jordan Kahu both retired at the end of the 2020 season, while David Fifita would be departing as well to join the Titans.

=== Kevin Walters era (2021–2024) ===
After missing out on the signature of Craig Bellamy as head coach, Kevin Walters was signed as coach for the 2021 NRL season for two years. Walters moved on two of Brisbane's players who were on large contracts in Jack Bird and Joe Ofahengaue. Brisbane brought in experienced players, John Asiata, Albert Kelly, David Mead, Dale Copley and Danny Levi in an attempt to take pressure off the young players. Walters named Alex Glenn as the captain for the 2021 season.

The problems at Red Hill continued, firstly surrendering a 16–0 lead against Parramatta in their season opener to concede the next 24 points without an answer to end up losing 16–24, followed by losing 16–28 to local rivals, the Gold Coast Titans to record their 13th loss in a row. In round 3, Brisbane recorded their first victory in 259 days after they beat Canterbury-Bankstown 24–0.

In round 8 of the 2021 NRL season, Brisbane staged an incredible comeback against the Gold Coast. After being down 22–0, Brisbane would go on to win the match 36–28.

An unlikely round 11 win against the Sydney Roosters at the Sydney Cricket Ground saw the Brisbane club end a 13-game losing streak outside of Queensland, however losses to Melbourne, St. George Illawarra, Canberra and South Sydney saw Brisbane once again fall to the bottom of the ladder as of round 15. The club would go on to win four of their last nine games to avoid the Wooden Spoon and finish in 14th place. Alex Glenn retired after this game, marking the end of a twelve-year career.

Even though Brisbane struggled, Tyson Gamble emerged as a serviceable half for the club. Gamble was limited to two games in 2020, but managed more game time under Walters, as he chopped and changed halves pairings throughout the season. The club also lured Karmichael Hunt back from the NSW Waratahs, twelve years after he initially departed the Broncos for Australian rules football.

During the season, the Brisbane club ran the broom through the front office and the playing group. Paul White resigned as CEO and was replaced with Dave Donaghy from the Storm. Donaghy began his tenure in the middle of 2021, after a lengthy legal process that prevented him from commencing his role earlier in the year. Former Bronco Ben Ikin was hired as the Football and Performance Director. The turnaround for Brisbane's recruitment seemingly began when the club announced the signing of embattled Rabbitohs half Adam Reynolds on a three-year deal from 2022 onwards. In addition to Reynolds, the club also signed Ryan James from the Raiders, Cowboys forward Corey Jensen, Kurt Capewell from the Panthers, as well as Jordan Pereira and Tyrone Roberts as depth signings. In addition to the new signings at the club, many of the young players extended their contracts to keep them at the Broncos, something that was becoming a rarity ever since 2018. Ben Te'o and Karmichael Hunt quietly retired from rugby league, while Danny Levi, Anthony Milford, John Asiata, Brodie Croft, Xavier Coates and Richard Kennar departed for other clubs. Jesse Arthars was also sent to the New Zealand Warriors on a loan deal for the 2022 season, expected to return for the 2023 campaign. Ex-Cowboy Te Maire Martin also made his NRL return with the Broncos, having initially retired three years prior due to a bleed on his brain. Adam Reynolds was named as the captain for the Brisbane in the 2022 season.

2022 began well for Brisbane, despite losing captain Adam Reynolds to COVID-19 in their Round 1 clash against the South Sydney Rabbitohs. They won their opening games against South Sydney and the Canterbury-Bankstown Bulldogs to sit in the top 8 at the end of the round for the first time since 2020. They then went on to lose three games in a row, before going on a seven-game winning streak, including a 38–0 thrashing of Manly and another comeback victory against the Gold Coast Titans. This was the longest winning streak the Broncos had experienced since winning six straight games under Wayne Bennett in 2017. During the club's winning streak, the club was rocked by star forward Payne Haas requesting a release, which was denied. During the Round 12 clash against the Gold Coast, Haas was relentlessly booed by Brisbane fans when he had the ball.

The Broncos' seven-game winning streak was broken by the Melbourne Storm, who had beaten the Brisbane side 32–20 after a shaky start. Brisbane were defeated 40–26 by North Queensland the following week, before winning three games in a row. The last placed Wests Tigers defeated Brisbane at home in an upset, winning 32–18. This match saw Patrick Carrigan placed on report for a 'hip drop' tackle on Jackson Hastings, which caused an injury to the Tigers' half and ended his season. Carrigan missed four matches due to suspension. After losing to the Sydney Roosters the following week, Brisbane seemed to be back on track after beating the Newcastle Knights 28–10. The final three rounds were a nightmare for the Broncos, as they recorded a 60–12 loss against the Storm, a 53–6 loss against the Eels, then a 22–12 loss to St. George Illawarra in the final round of the regular season. Brisbane's horrific performances saw them drop out of the top 8 and miss the finals for a third straight season, the longest consecutive finals drought in Brisbane's history to date. The club also made history for the wrong reasons, being the first club to miss the finals with more wins than losses since Canberra in 1999, as well as being the first club to sit in the top four after Round 17 and miss the finals.

During the 2022 season, rumors had persisted that Warriors fullback Reece Walsh was seeking a return to Australia after the New Zealand Warriors had announced that they would be returning to New Zealand. However, both the Warriors and Walsh denied the rumours and insisted that he was committed to the move. In July, however, reports began emerging that Walsh was granted a release from the Warriors and that he was looking to return to a Queensland team. On 7 July, the Broncos confirmed the signing of Walsh for 2023 and beyond. To accommodate Walsh in the salary cap, utility back Te Maire Martin was given permission to negotiate with other clubs and signed with the New Zealand Warriors from 2023 onwards.

At the start of the final round of the regular 2023 season, Brisbane was positioned on top of the NRL ladder. Brisbane lost their final regular season game against the Melbourne Storm 22–32 and missed out on claiming their first minor premiership win since 2000, due to having a lesser points differential than the Penrith Panthers, who shared the same number of points. Notwithstanding, Brisbane qualified to play Penrith in the 2023 NRL Grand Final at Stadium Australia on 1 October. Brisbane lost the game, having led the game 24–8 with 18 minutes of play remaining to lose 24–26. This was the worst collapse in NRL Grand final history.

Under Walters in the 2024 NRL season, Brisbane were unable to back up their feats from 2023 with the club finishing twelfth on the table. Walters' position as Brisbane head coach came under heavy scrutiny by the media. The club conducted an internal review after the end of the regular season, and Walters was terminated from his coaching position on 26 September 2024. Michael Maguire was subsequently appointed immediately as head coach for the next three seasons.

=== Michael Maguire era (2025–present) ===
In September 2024, the Brisbane Broncos confirmed that Michael Maguire had been signed for three years and would immediately take over as head coach ahead of the 2025 pre-season. The Broncos finished first in the 2025 NRL Pre-season Challenge played in February, prior to the commencement of the regular 2025 NRL season in March. After finishing fourth at the end of the regular season, they qualified to play the Melbourne Storm in the 2025 NRL Grand Final, in which Brisbane defeated Melbourne 26-22 to capture their 7th premiership; their first since 2006, ending the 19-year premiership drought.

Brisbane did not participate in the 2026 NRL Pre-season Challenge in Australia. On 19 February 2026, Brisbane were defeated by Hull KR 30-24 in the 2026 World Club Challenge at MKM Stadium, England. In round 18 of the 2026 NRL season, Brisbane lost their eighth consecutive match. The club finished 14th on the table, with its title defence described as one of the worst in the modern era of rugby league.

==== 2026 Ladder ====
Pos	Team	Pld	W	D	L	B	PF	PA	PD	Pts	Qualification
1	Penrith Panthers	24	18	0	6	3	683	347	+336	42	Advance to finals series
2	New Zealand Warriors	24	18	0	6	3	728	418	+310	42	Advance to finals series
3	Dolphins	24	17	0	7	3	662	506	+156	40	Advance to finals series
4	Sydney Roosters (P)	24	16	0	8	3	619	501	+118	38	Advance to finals series
5	Cronulla-Sutherland Sharks	24	14	0	10	3	672	523	+149	34	Advance to finals series
6	South Sydney Rabbitohs	24	14	0	10	3	694	581	+113	34	Advance to finals series
7	Newcastle Knights	24	14	0	10	3	633	591	+42	34	Advance to finals series
8	North Queensland Cowboys	24	13	0	11	3	568	652	−84	32	Advance to finals series
9	Manly Warringah Sea Eagles	24	11	0	13	3	623	524	+99	28	
10	Melbourne Storm	24	11	0	13	3	594	576	+18	28	
11	Canberra Raiders	24	11	0	13	3	581	626	−45	28	
12	Canterbury-Bankstown Bulldogs	24	11	0	13	3	476	536	−60	28	
13	Parramatta Eels	24	9	0	15	3	497	678	−181	24	
14	Brisbane Broncos	24	8	0	16	3	471	677	−206	22	
15	Wests Tigers	24	8	0	16	3	445	699	−254	22	
16	Gold Coast Titans	24	6	0	18	3	477	663	−186	18	
17	St. George Illawarra Dragons	24	5	0	19	3	392	717	−325	16	

Source: National Rugby League
Rules for classification: 1) competition points; 2) points differential; 3) percentage; (Note: Greater percentage of points scored for and against, being determined by points scored for divided by points scored against expressed as a percentage.) 4) tries scored; (Note: Further tiebreakers (in order) include goals scored, field goals kicked; least amount of penalties conceded.)
(P) Premiers

== Emblem and colours ==
Brisbane Broncos - Logos

1988-1999

2000-2005

2006-2025

2026-

It had originally been planned for the Brisbane Broncos to adopt a logo incorporating both a kangaroo and a stylised "Q" which had been featured in the logo for the Queensland Rugby League for many years. However, with the Australian national rugby league team also known as the Kangaroos, this was deemed inappropriate and conflicting. The state flower the Cooktown Orchid and the Poinsettia which had long been used by Brisbane representative teams in the Bulimba Cup and midweek knockout competitions was also ruled out, along with other Australian animals such as the brumby, possum, galah and the kookaburra, which was used on Brisbane's Kookaburra Queen paddleships.

Having wanted to continue with the use of alliteration for local sporting teams such as the Brisbane Bullets and Brisbane Bears (later the Brisbane Lions), the club's directors eventually decided on the nickname Broncos. This name was chosen by Barry Maranta because he was a fan of an NFL team, the Denver Broncos. The Australian newspaper has described the name as "Mystifyingly American".

The original club logo was first featured in the Broncos' inaugural season in the premiership in 1988 and was used until 1999. It used a mostly gold colour scheme, in line with the predominant colour on the team jerseys. In 2000, the club adopted a new logo with a more maroon design, which was much closer to the traditional colour associated with Queensland rugby league and Queensland sport in general. This design continued to be used until 2025.

Traditionally, the colours of the Brisbane Broncos have been maroon, white and gold, which have all long been linked to the history of rugby league in Queensland. Initially, the founders of the club favored the official blue and gold colours of Brisbane City Council. However, Sydney advertiser John Singleton advised the board that "Queenslanders had been booing players wearing blue for more than three-quarters of a century." As a result, the traditional maroon and white colours of Queensland along with gold, symbolizing the Queensland sunshine, were adopted as the club's colours.

In the inaugural 1988 season, the club's jersey design featured the top third being gold, the middle being alternating hoops of maroon and white and the bottom third being maroon. Although this design featured gold strongly, it did not please everyone as the jersey had to differentiate from the maroon and white of Manly-Warringah Sea Eagles and the maroon of the Queensland rugby league team. Following a number of design changes in the 1990s including a predominantly white jersey from 1997 to 1998, blue was added to the jersey in 2001 as a minor colour to show the aforementioned historical link with the colours of Brisbane. However, this was later dropped from the design in favor of a mainly maroon jersey with gold trim.

At the 1995 Rugby League World Sevens tournament, the club introduced a new combination of jersey colours – mauve, aqua and white. Brisbane Broncos Marketing Manager Shane Edwards stated that it "will become our Sevens strip... but we will never change the Broncos' colours." In 2001, following the release of the club's predominantly white with navy-blue and maroon away jersey, the National Rugby League ordered the club to produce a third jersey since the new away jersey clashed with the home jerseys of the Penrith Panthers, Melbourne Storm and New Zealand Warriors. An aqua strip using the same design as the jerseys used from 1999 to 2001 was worn, which was much derided by the local media. Following two years of public pressure the club dropped the jersey in favor of the design worn against Newcastle in 2003.

International Sports Clothing became Brisbane's kit provider in October 2016, replacing long-time suppliers Nike.

In November 2025, the Broncos launched a bold new club identity, putting Brisbane at the forefront and marking the first makeover of the iconic brand in more than 20 years. The modern new logo features the iconic Bronco, forward-facing, at its heart, a shield nodding to the original 1988 logo, and the Brisbane River flowing through the mark. This rebrand marks only the third in the Club’s 38-year history.

Brisbane Broncos - Jerseys

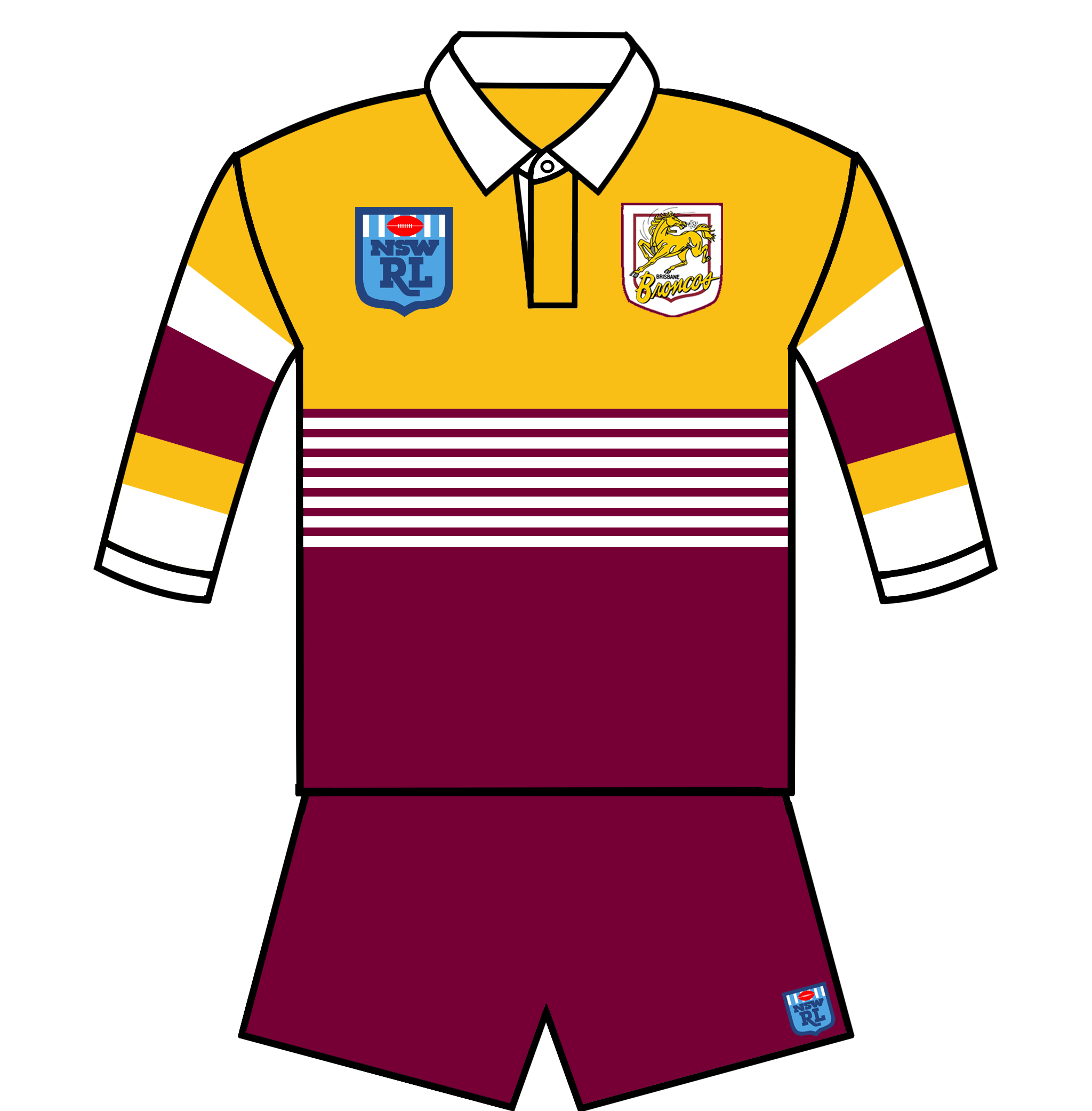
1988–1990

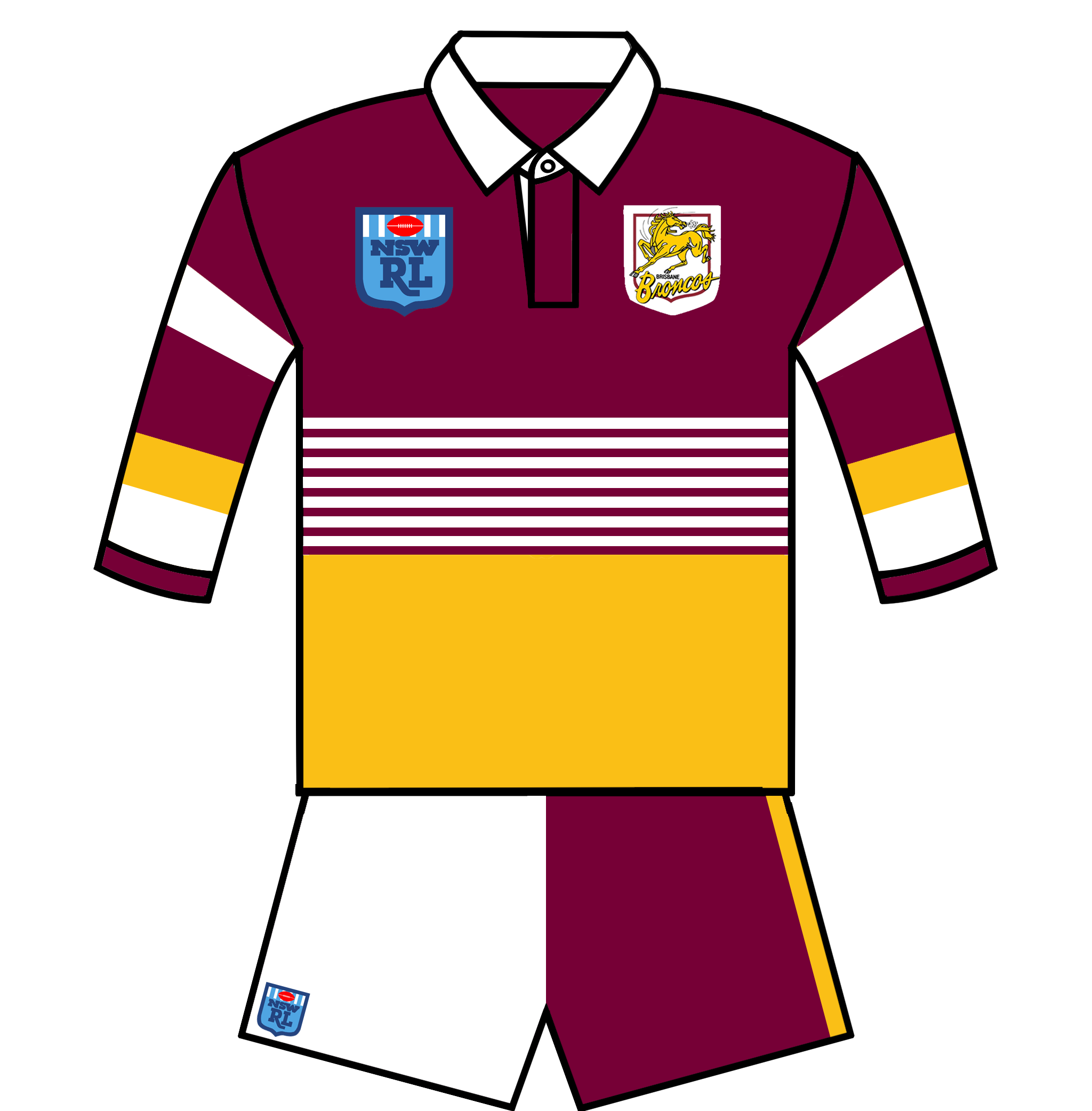
1991–1996

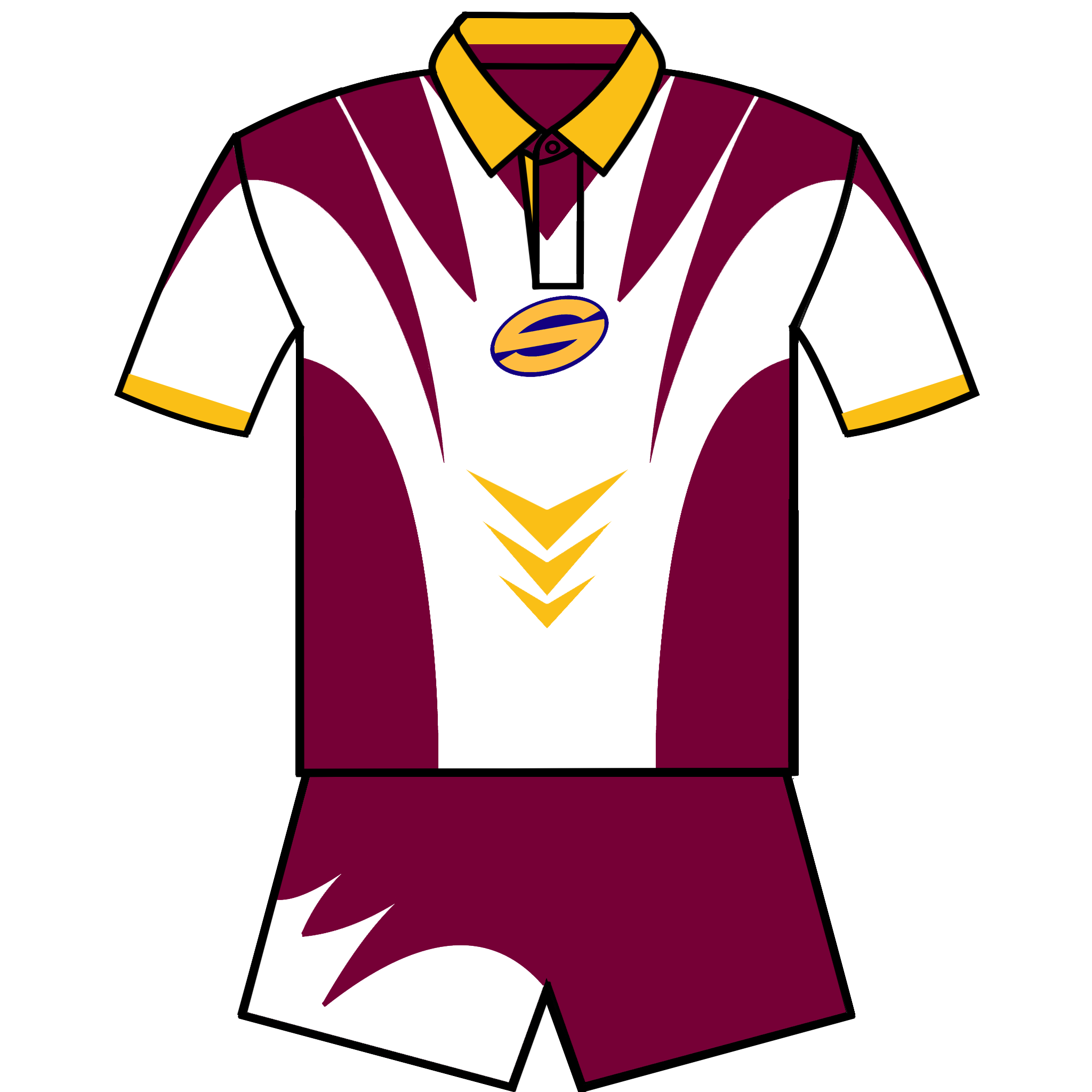
1997–1998

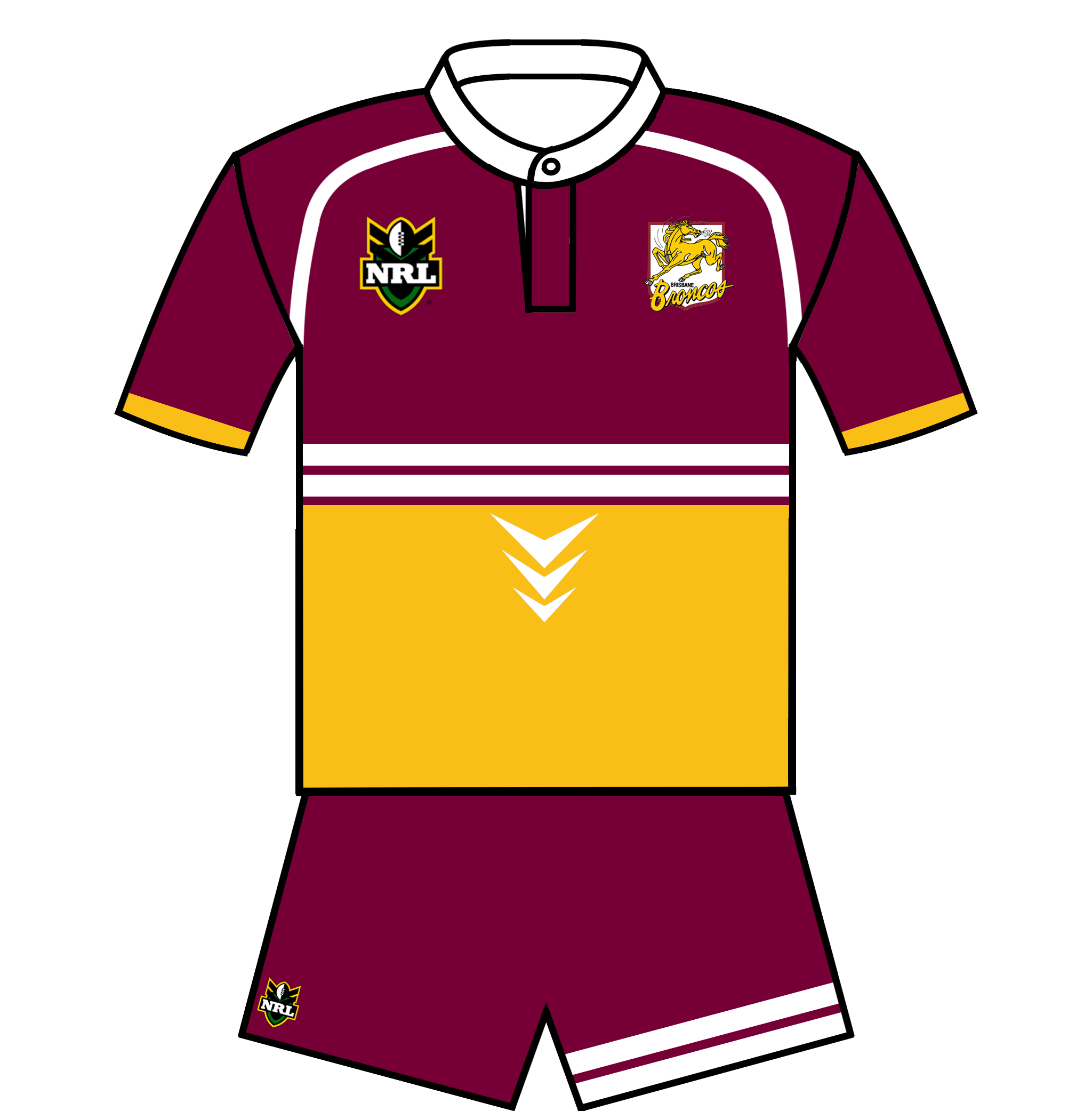
1999–2001

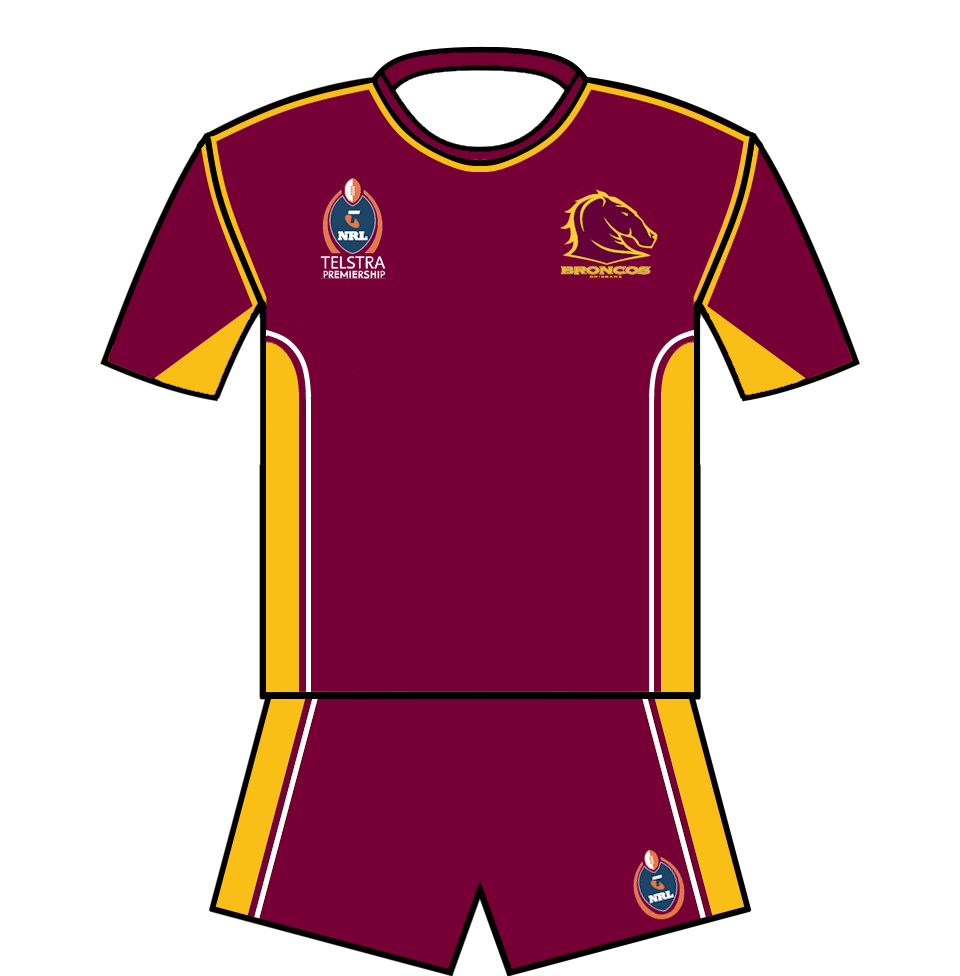
2002-2006

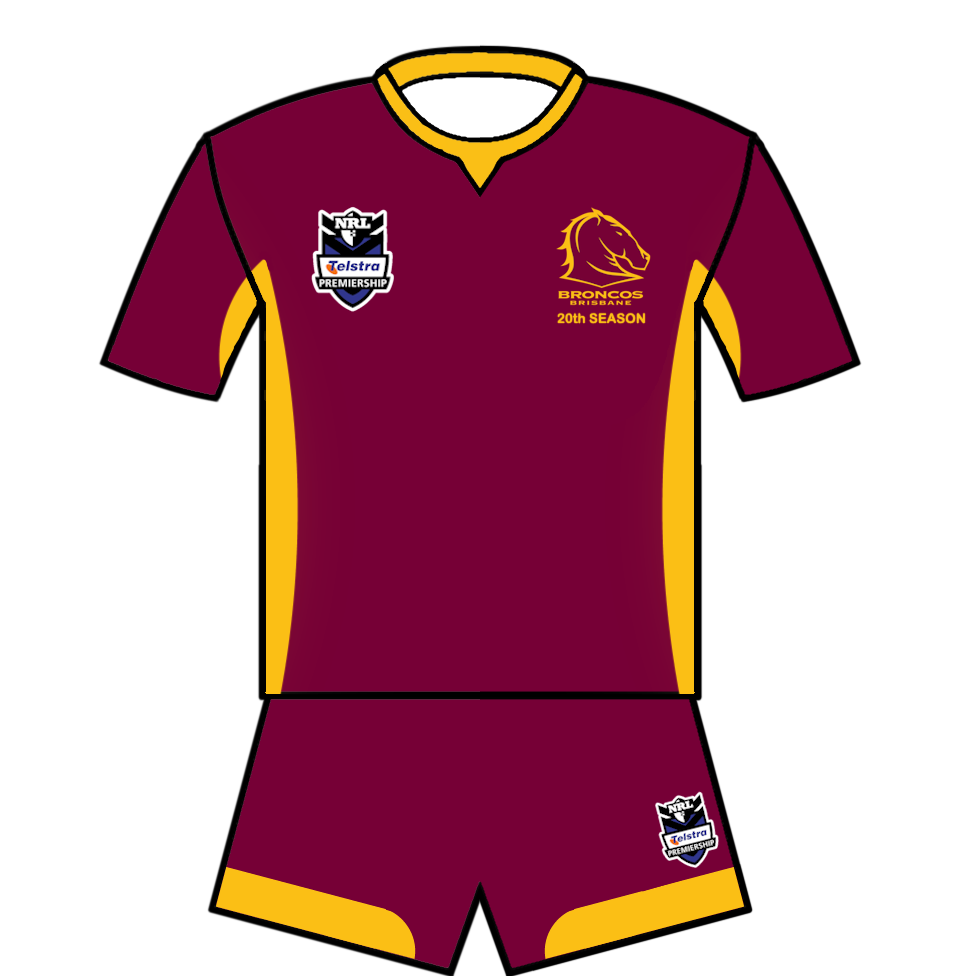
2007-2009

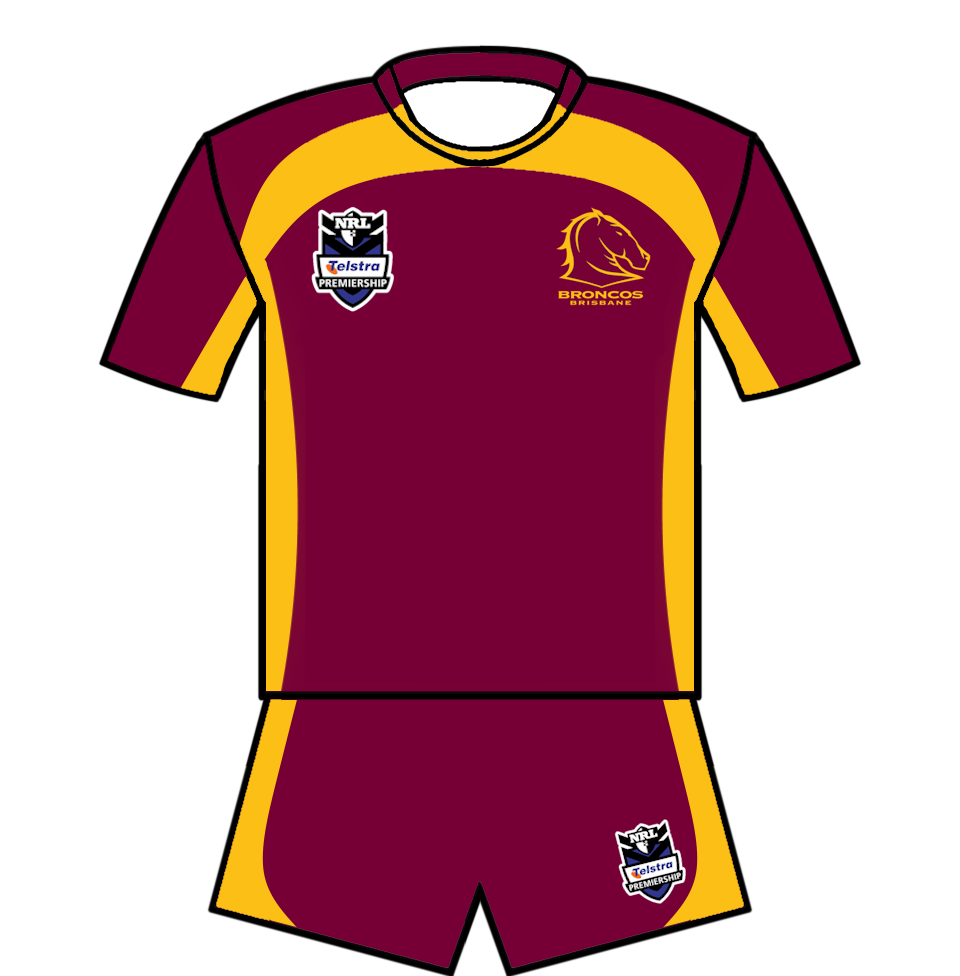
2010-2012

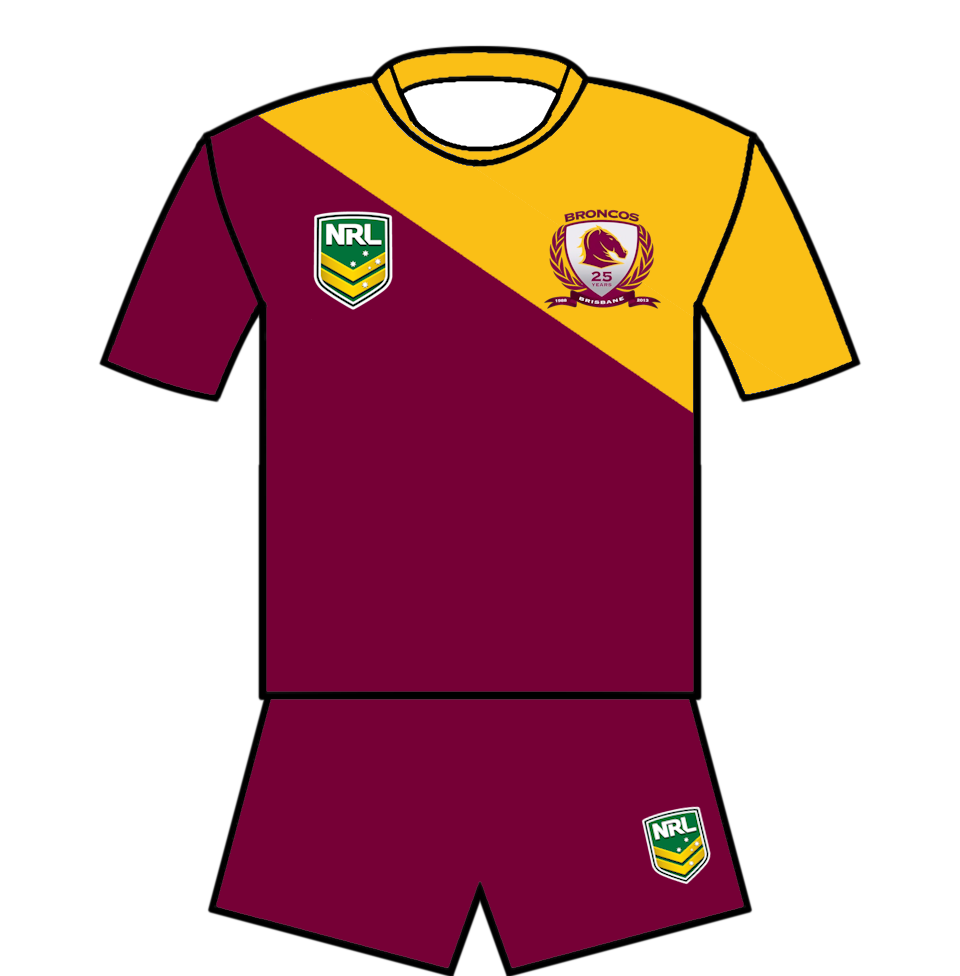
2013-2014

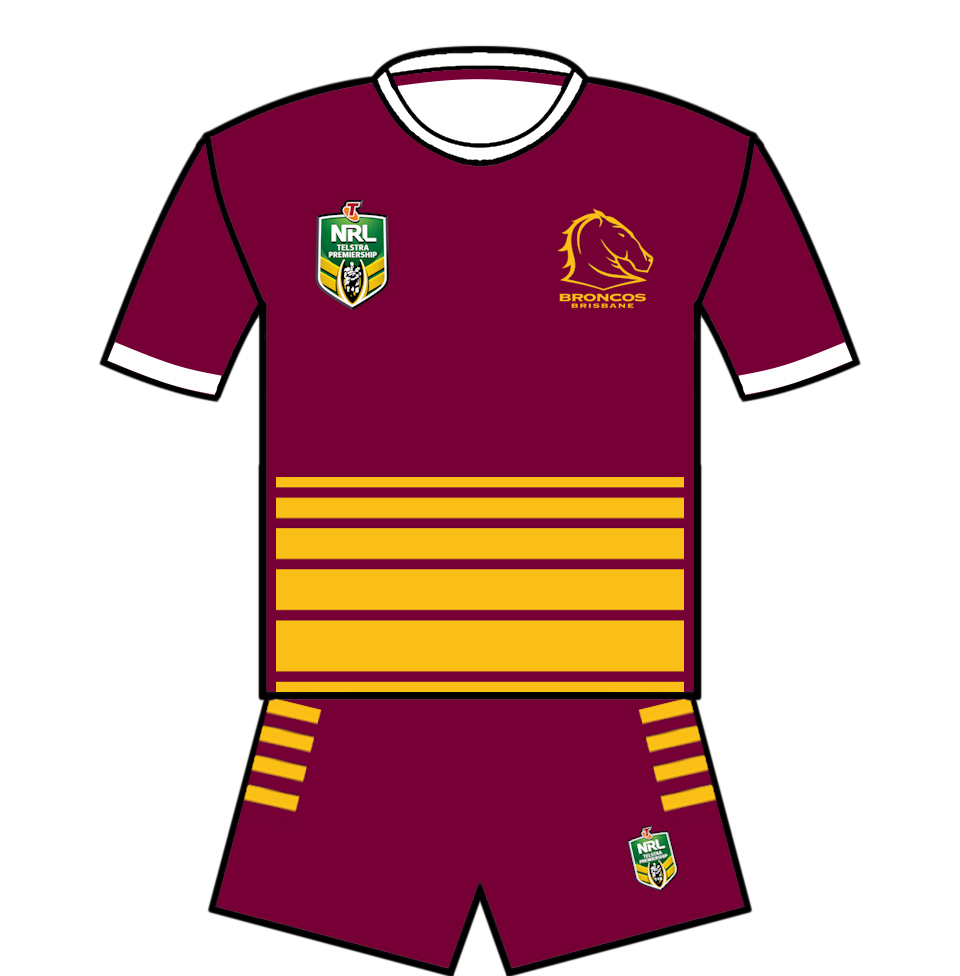
2015-2016

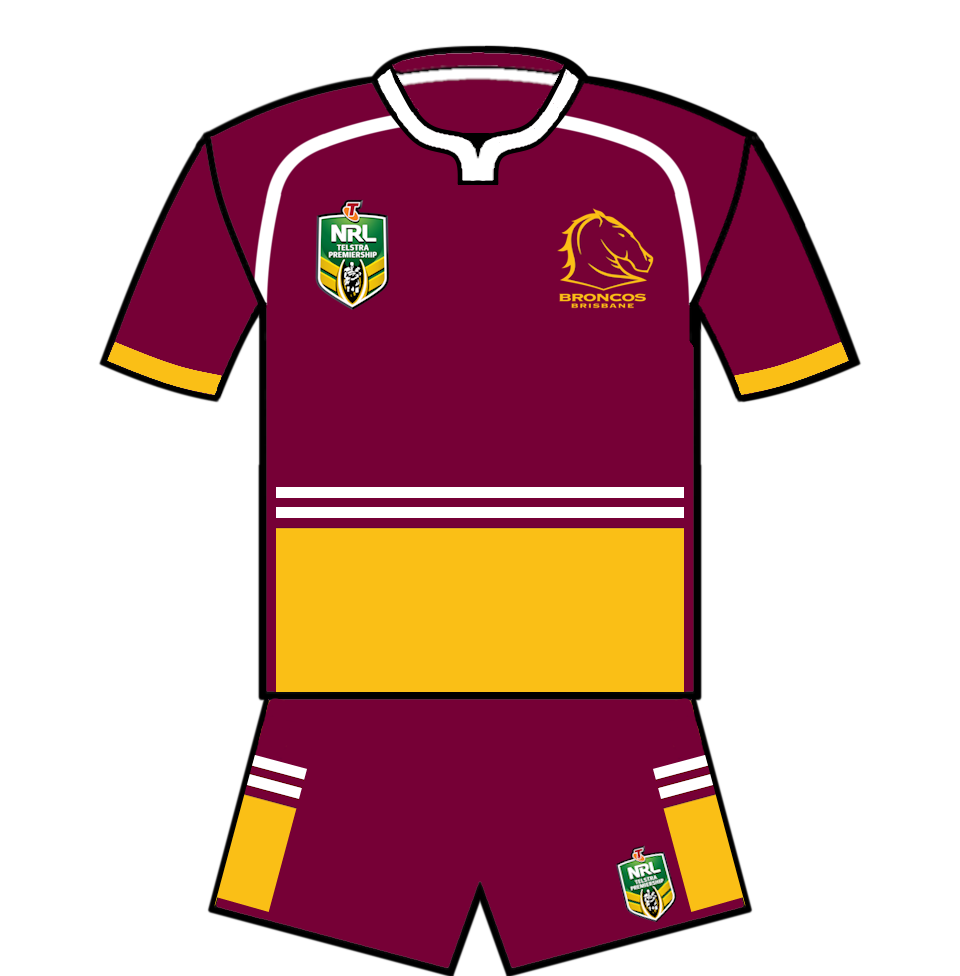
2017-2018

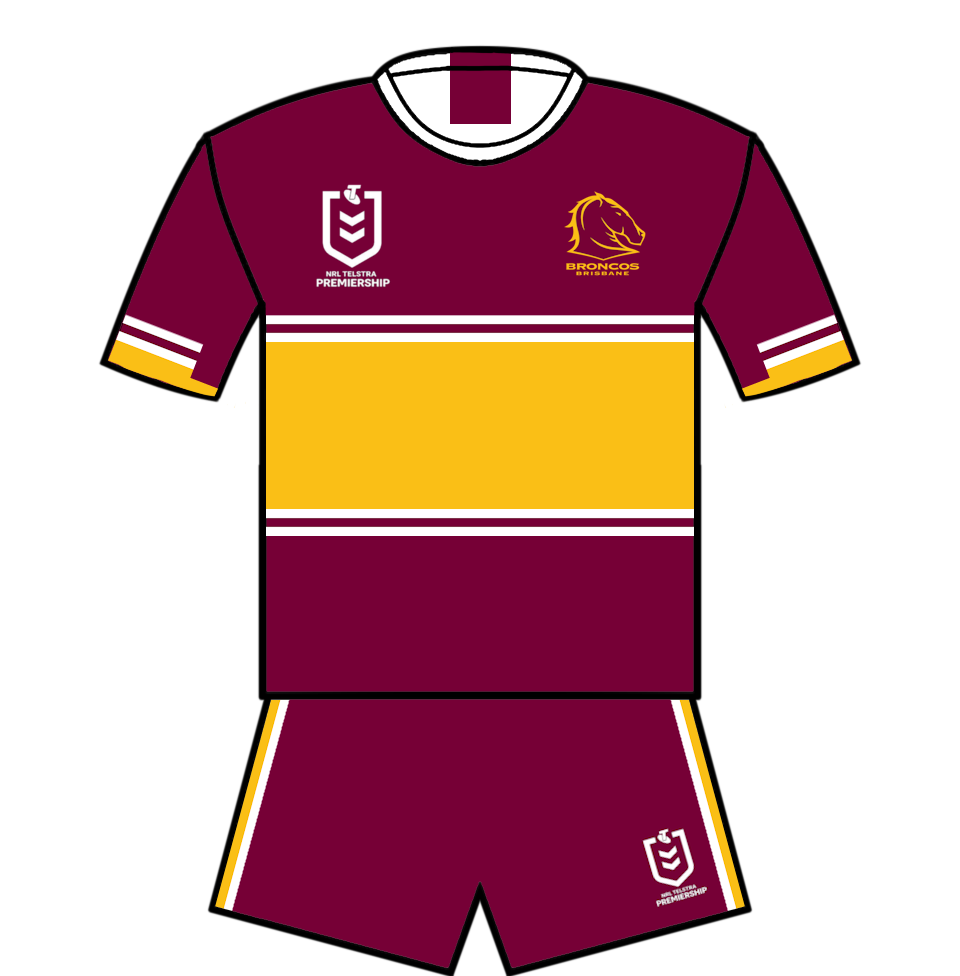
2019-2020

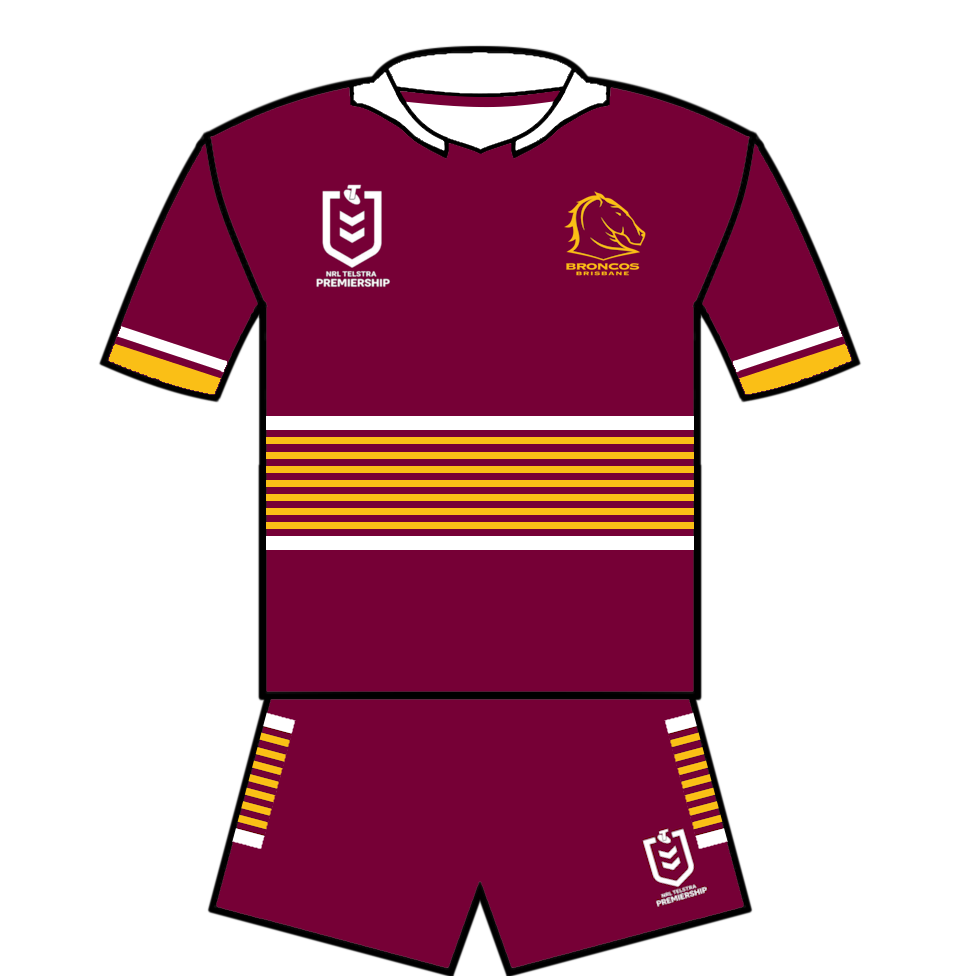
2021-2022

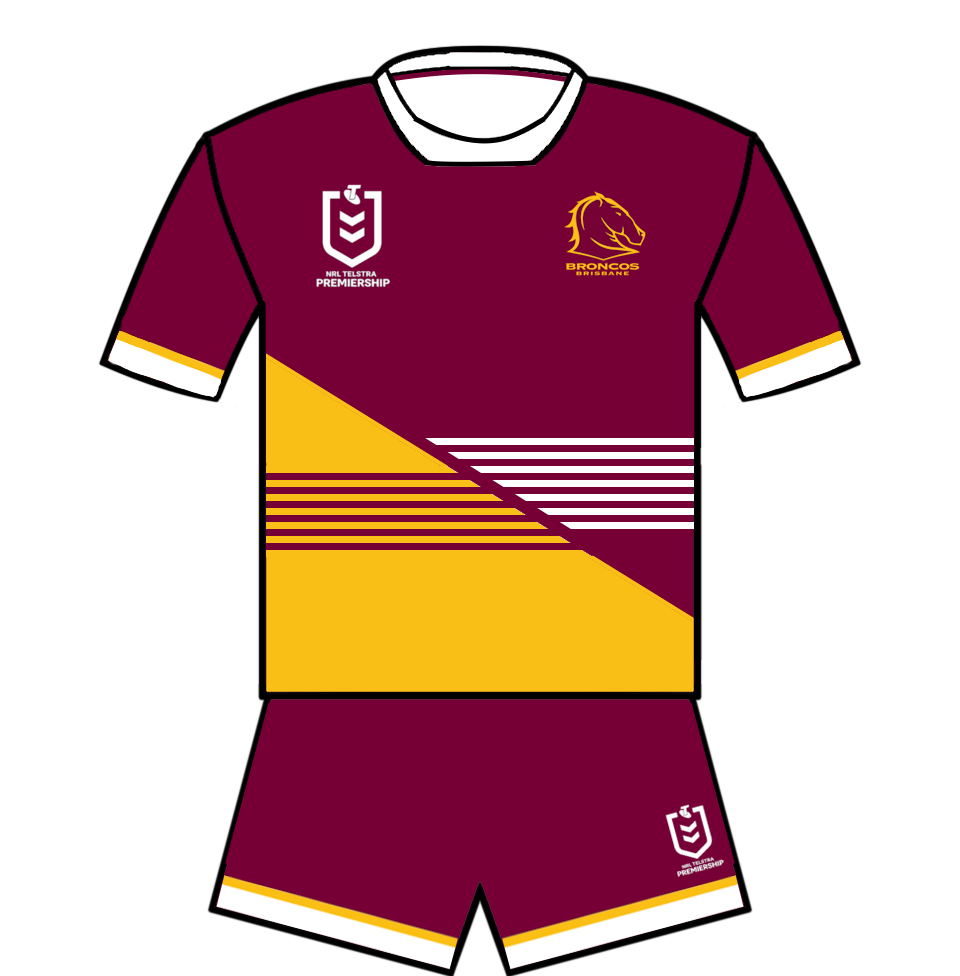
2023-2024

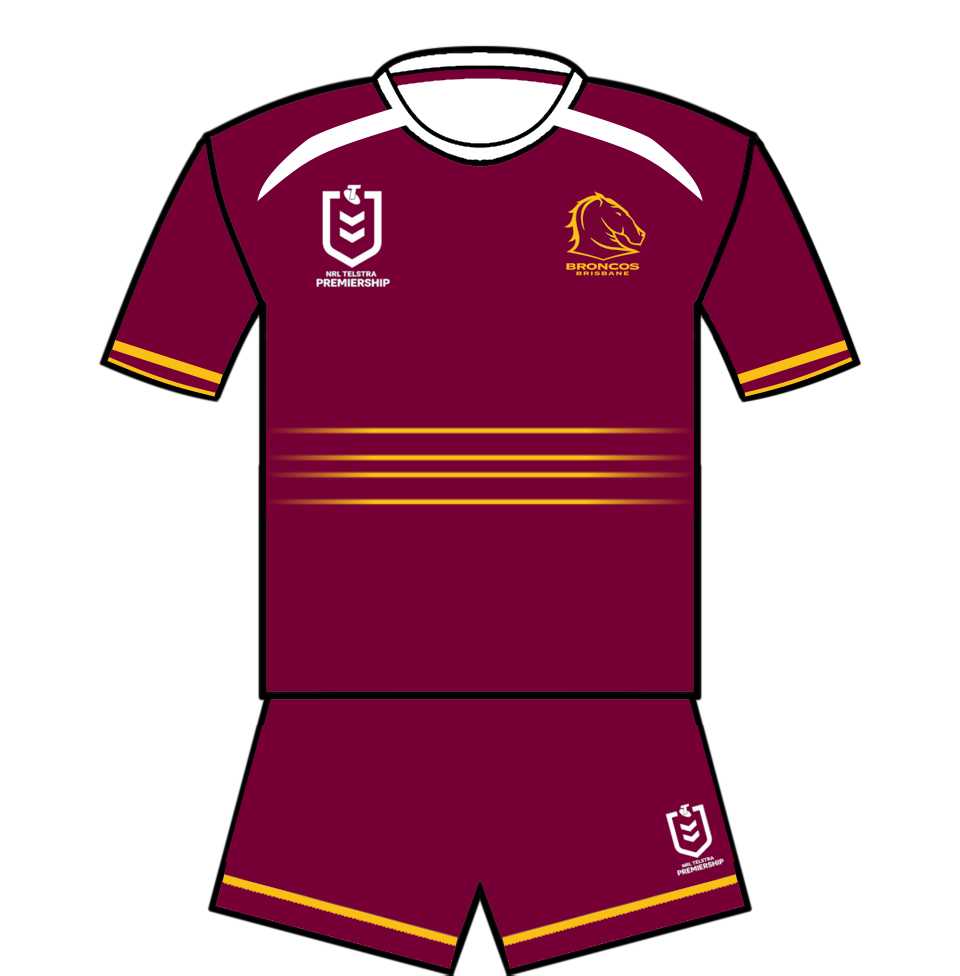
2025-

== Stadium ==
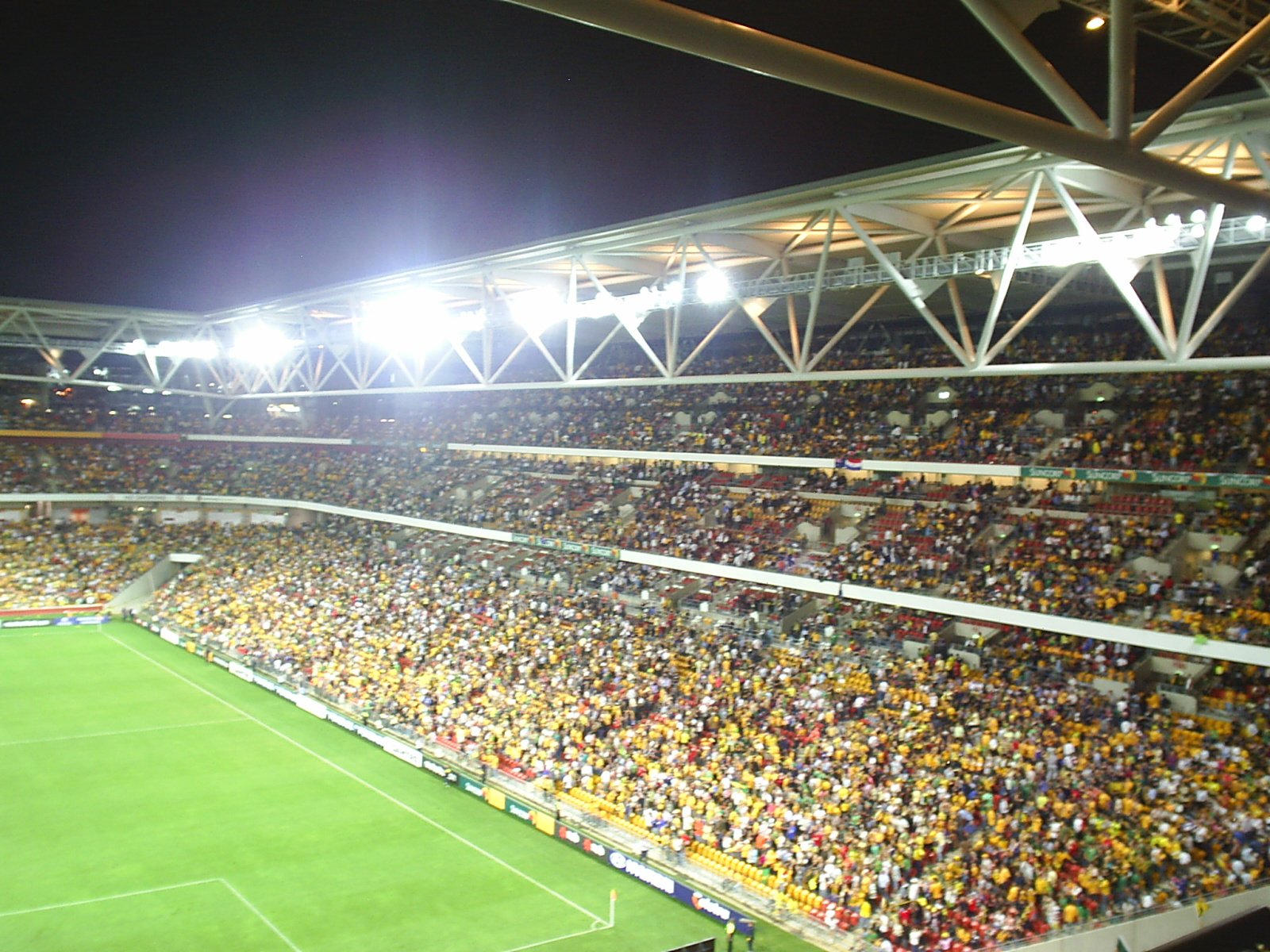
View of the current Brisbane Broncos home ground, Lang Park.

In their first five seasons, the Broncos played their matches at the 52,500 capacity Lang Park, the ground considered to be the home of rugby league in Queensland. However, following ongoing conflict with the Queensland Rugby League and Lang Park Trust due to a sponsorship conflict with the QRL having a commercial agreement with Castlemaine XXXX brewery with prominent signs around the ground, while the Broncos were sponsored by rival brewery Powers who were not permitted any permanent signs (the Broncos initially got around this by not using the change rooms at half time during games, instead sitting on the ground with a temporary protective banner surrounding them which just happened to have prominent Powers logos), the team relocated to the 60,000 capacity QEII Stadium in 1993 (QEII had been the main stadium of the 1982 Commonwealth Games). The club's home match attendance, which had averaged 19,637 at Lang Park, increased to 43,200 at the new ground in the first season following the club's first premiership title in the previous season. However, despite the team's second premiership in 1993, crowds gradually declined and it was not until 2002 that the club again registered more than the 1996 average attendance of 23,712. QEII Stadium, as the Queensland Sport and Athletics Centre was called at the time due to sponsorship rights, was featured on an episode of The Mole in April 2002.

With the Queensland Government's $280 million redevelopment of Lang Park, the team moved back to the refurbished ground upon its completion in mid-2003. The more centrally located stadium has begun to attract larger crowds, with the 2006 average attendance of 31,208 being significantly higher than the Newcastle Knights with 21,848 and about double the regular season competition average of 15,601.

The club record attendance for a regular season match is 58,593, set against the St. George Dragons in the final round of the 1993 season. The record attendance for a match at Lang Park is 50,859 for Darren Lockyer's final home game. Before kick-off at the Stadium an instrumental version of Led Zeppelin's "Kashmir" is routinely played. Whenever the Broncos score a try, "Chelsea Dagger" by The Fratellis is played.

The Broncos all-time home attendance record was set at QEII Stadium during the 1997 Super League Grand Final when 58,912 saw the Broncos defeat the Cronulla Sharks 26–8 to claim the only Super League premiership played in Australia.

The Broncos record home attendance at Lang Park set during the 2023 Preliminary Final on 23 September 2023, when 52,273 saw the Broncos defeat the New Zealand Warriors 42–12 to win a place in the 2023 NRL Grand Final.

Home venues
Venue	Years
Lang Park	1988–present
Pioneer Oval	1989–1994
Parramatta Stadium	1989
Townsville Sports Reserve	1989
Carrington Park	1989
Wade Park	1991
Scully Park	1991
Bundaberg Showroom	1991
Eric Weissel Oval	1992
Athletic Park	1992
QEII Stadium	1993–2003
ANZAC Oval	1994
Hyatt Regency	1995
Bega Recreational Ground	1995
Coffs Coast International Stadium	1995
Lavington Sports Ground	1995
Carrara	2001
The Gabba	2023

== Supporters ==
The Brisbane Broncos have the largest fan base of any NRL club and they have been voted the most popular rugby league team in Australia for several years. A Broncos supporters group called "The Thoroughbreds" which is made up of prominent businessmen, made an unsuccessful bid to purchase News Ltd's controlling share of the club in 2007.

Average regular season attendance

- 1988: 16,111 (lowest home attendance)
- 1989: 18,217
- 1990: 22,709
- 1991: 19,463
- 1992: 21,687
- 1993: 43,200 (largest home attendance)
- 1994: 37,705
- 1995: 35,902
- 1996: 23,712
- 1997: 19,298
- 1998: 20,073
- 1999: 22,763
- 2000: 21,239
- 2001: 19,710
- 2002: 20,131
- 2003: 24,326
- 2004: 28,667
- 2005: 30,331
- 2006: 31,208
- 2007: 32,868
- 2008: 33,426
- 2009: 34,587
- 2010: 35,032
- 2011: 33,209
- 2012: 33,337
- 2013: 30,480
- 2014: 34,235
- 2015: 36,096
- 2016: 34,476
- 2017: 31,929
- 2018: 31,394
- 2019: 29,516
- 2020: 8,624 (Attendance numbers impacted by crowd restrictions due to the COVID-19 pandemic)
- 2021: 21,444 (Attendance numbers impacted by crowd restrictions due to the COVID-19 pandemic)
- 2022: 29,594
- 2023: 33,793
- 2024: 39,873
- 2025: 41,185

=== Notable supporters ===
Notable supporters of this club, amongst others, include:

- Mackenzie Arnold, Australian footballer and goalkeeper
- Carl Barron, Australian comedian
- Allan Border, Australian cricket captain
- Quentin Bryce, 25th Governor General of Australia
- Cate Campbell, Malawian-born Australian swimmer and Olympic gold medallist
- Jim Chalmers, 41st Treasurer of Australia
- Cameron Dick, 36th Deputy Premier of Queensland
- Andrew Fraser, 47th Treasurer of Queensland
- Bernard Fanning, lead singer of Powderfinger
- Katrina Gorry, Australian footballer
- Wayne Goss, 34th Premier of Queensland
- Ian Healy, former international wicket-keeper
- Les Hiddins, former Australian soldier, known as "The Bush Tucker Man"
- Mark Hunt, mixed martial artist
- Dami Im, singer, winner of The X Factor Australia in 2013
- Steve Irwin, TV personality and environmentalist
- Marnus Labuschagne, South African-born Australian cricketer
- Denan Kemp, Former NRL Player and owner and creator of Bloke In A Bar, Bloke Beer and Grumpy Coffee
- Lincoln Lewis, Australian actor
- Craig Lowndes, V8 Supercars driver
- Chris Lynn, Australian cricketer
- Steven Miles, 40th Premier of Queensland
- Patty Mills, professional basketballer
- Susie O' Neill, former Australian Swimmer
- James Parsons, former Auckland Blues and All Blacks Hooker
- Sally Pearson, Olympic athlete
- Rick Price, musician
- Terry Price, professional golfer
- Patrick Rafter, retired tennis player
- Kevin Rudd, 26th Prime Minister of Australia
- Cam Smith, professional golfer
- Karl Stefanovic, television presenter
- Samantha Stosur, professional tennis player and 2011 US Open champion
- Andrew Symonds, international cricketer
- Ken Talbot, mining magnate
- Georgie Tunny, Channel 10 presenter
- Don Walker, musician

== Corporate ==
The Broncos are the only publicly listed NRL club. The largest shareholder in the Broncos is Nationwide News Pty Ltd, a subsidiary of News Corp Australia, which as of 30 June 2025, owned 68.87%. BGM Projects is another major shareholder.

John Ribot, a former first grade rugby league player in Queensland and New South Wales, was the club's original chief executive officer (CEO). Ribot left when he signed to become the CEO of the rebel Australian rugby league competition Super League. (p. 24,112) Shane Edwards, the Broncos Marketing Manager at the time, was promoted to CEO and later resigned. Bruno Cullen, who had been with the Broncos' off-field staff since 1989, became the club's third CEO in 2003. In 2011 Cullen was replaced by current CEO Paul White. Rugby league player Darren Lockyer is a member of the board of directors.

Kia are the major sponsor of the Broncos as of 2020, replacing NRMA Insurance. Nova 106.9 are the main radio sponsors after taking over from rival station B105 FM in late 2006. Live broadcasts of all Broncos matches are provided by both ABC Radio Brisbane and Triple M. Channel Nine Queensland also sponsors the Broncos, although former player Shane Webcke is signed to rival Seven Queensland.

In 2012, local Brisbane based company Firstmac replaced WOW Sight & Sound as sleeve sponsor for three years to launch into the retail financial services market. This sponsorship took only 9 days to negotiate following the announcement of WOW Sight & Sound going into receivership. Firstmac stipulated a unique clause in their contract that they could pay for 250 tickets to be distributed to WOW Sight & Sound staff that lost their jobs. Firstmac has since launched a Firstmac Broncos home loan in conjunction with their new sponsorship agreement.

Asics are the Broncos current apparel provider as of November 2020.

Between 1997 and 2016, the club's apparel was manufactured by Nike. Between 2017 and 2020, International Sports Clothing served as the club's apparel manufacturer. From the 2021 season, Asics will supply the club's on-and-off-field apparel.

== Sponsors ==
The Brisbane Broncos' first major sponsor was Powers Brewing who sponsored them until 1993. The Broncos currently have a number of sponsorship deals with the following:

- Kia Motors
- NRMA Insurance
- ISC
- Firstmac / loans.com.au
- Asics
- Coca-Cola
- Powerade
- Star Entertainment Group
- Hostplus
- Deadly Choices
- Arrow Energy
- Tyrepower
- National Storage
- BCF
- New Era
- Nova 106.9
- Nine News Queensland
- McDonald's
- The Courier-Mail
- Event Cinemas
- XXXX Gold
- Four'n Twenty
- Makita
- Gallagher Insurance
- World Gym
- Hyperice
- Australian Venue Co.
- Elastoplast

Year	Kit Manufacturer	Major Sponsor	Back Top Sponsor	Sleeve Sponsor	Back Bottom Sponsor	Front Shorts Sponsor	Back Shorts Sponsor
1988-89	Peerless	Power	Power	-	-	-	-
1990	Peerless	Power's	Power's	TR Auscel	-	Power's Brewery	-
1991-93	M Sport	Power's	Power's	TDK	-	-	-
1994	M Sport	Traveland	Traveland	TDK	-	Traveland	-
1995	M Sport	Traveland	Traveland	MMI	-	Traveland	-
1996	M Sport	Traveland	Traveland	Ansett Australia	-	Traveland	-
1997	Nike	Ansett Australia	-	Ansett Australia	-	-	-
1998	Nike	Ansett Australia	-	Ansett Australia	-	Ansett Australia	-
1999	Nike	131 Shop	131 Shop	Ansett Australia	-	-	-
2000-01	Nike	Ergon Energy	Ergon Energy	Ansett Australia	-	Keno	-
2002-03	Nike	Ergon Energy	Ergon Energy	Keno	-	-	-
2004	Nike	Ergon Energy	Ergon Energy	Mortgage House	-	NRMA Insurance	NRMA Insurance
2005	Nike	Ergon Energy	Ergon Energy	QLD Group	-	NRMA Insurance	NRMA Insurance
2006	Nike	Ergon Energy	Ergon Energy	QLD Group	Strathfield	NRMA Insurance	NRMA Insurance
2007	Nike	Ergon Energy	Ergon Energy	WOW Sight & Sound	Toyota	NRMA Insurance	NRMA Insurance
2008-09	Nike	WOW Sight & Sound	The Coffee Club	WOW Sight & Sound	Toyota	NRMA Insurance	NRMA Insurance
2010	Nike	WOW Sight & Sound	The Coffee Club	WOW Sight & Sound	Sportingbet	NRMA Insurance	NRMA Insurance
2011	Nike	NRMA Insurance	Sportingbet	WOW Sight & Sound	Hans	PNG Bid	PNG Bid
2012	Nike	NRMA Insurance	Sportingbet	WOW Sight & Sound	Hans	Arrow Energy	Arrow Energy
2013	Nike	NRMA Insurance	Sportingbet	FirstMac Loan Savings	Hans	Arrow Energy	Arrow Energy
2014	Nike	NRMA Insurance	Sportingbet	FirstMac Loan Savings	Pirtek	Arrow Energy	Arrow Energy
2015	Nike	NRMA Insurance	William Hill	FirstMac Loan Savings	Pirtek	Arrow Energy	Arrow Energy
2016	Nike	NRMA Insurance	William Hill	FirstMac Loan Savings	National Storage	Arrow Energy	Arrow Energy
2017-19	ISC	NRMA Insurance	Ladbrokes	FirstMac Loan Savings	National Storage	Arrow Energy	Arrow Energy
2020	ISC	Kia	Ladbrokes	FirstMac Loan Savings	National Storage	Arrow Energy	Arrow Energy
2021	Asics	Kia	Ladbrokes	FirstMac Loan Savings	National Storage	Arrow Energy	Arrow Energy
2022	Asics	Kia	Ladbrokes	FirstMac Loan Savings	National Storage	BCF	BCF
2023-	Asics	Kia	The Star	FirstMac Loan Savings	National Storage	BCF	BCF

== Players ==
Brisbane Broncos 2027 Squad
Top 30 squad - 2027 NRL season			Coaching staff
Mitch Barnett – PR; Shawn Blore – SR; Cameron Bukowski – HK; Patrick Carrigan – LK; Phillip Coates – WG; Tom Duffy – FE, HB; Tupou Francis – LK; Dane Gagai – CE; Ben Hunt – HK, HB, FE; Josiah Karapani – WG	Ezra Mam – FE; Deine Mariner – WG, CE; Blake Mozer – HK; Cory Paix – HK; Jonah Pezet – HB; Hayze Perham – FB; Brendan Piakura – SR; Jordan Riki – SR; Preston Riki – PR; Va'a Semu – PR	Kotoni Staggs – CE; Ben Talty – PR; Aublix Tawha – SR; Antonio Verhoeven – CE; Reece Walsh – FB; Billy Walters – HK; Xavier Willison – PR, SR, LK	Head coach: Michael Maguire; Assistant coaches: Matt Ballin; Trent Barrett; Adam Brideson (Development & Transition); Jon Clarke (Head of Performance); Legend: (c) Captain(s); (vc) Vice-captain(s); Updated: 22 November 2026; Source(s): Broncos Team Profiles

=== Notable players ===
Due to the club's premiership success and its being the dominant Queensland team in the competition for the majority of its participation, the Brisbane Broncos' list of representative players is extensive. Consequently, there have been a large number of Queensland Maroons in the team. In 2007, a 20-man legends team was announced to celebrate the club's 20-year anniversary.

Broncos Legends
First team squad	Interchange	Coaching staff
1 Darren Lockyer – FB; 2 Michael Hancock – WG; 3 Steve Renouf – CE; 4 Michael De Vere – CE; 5 Wendell Sailor – WG; 6 Wally Lewis – FE; 7 Allan Langer – HB; 8 Shane Webcke – PR; 9 Kerrod Walters – HK; 10 Petero Civoniceva – PR; 11 Gorden Tallis – SR; 12 Brad Thorn – SR; 13 Tonie Carroll – LK	14 Shaun Berrigan – HK; 15 Andrew Gee – PR; 16 Gene Miles – SR; 17 Glenn Lazarus – PR; 18 Chris Johns – CE; 19 Terry Matterson – LK; 20 Kevin Walters – FE	Legend: (c) Captain(s); (vc) Vice-captain(s); Updated: 9 May 2007; Source(s): Broncos Name Legends Team

=== 1988 first-ever squad ===
- Colin Scott – Fullback
- Joe Kilroy – Wing
- Chris Johns – Centre
- Gene Miles – Centre
- Michael Hancock – Wing
- Wally Lewis – Five-eighth
- Allan Langer – Halfback
- Terry Matterson – Lock
- Brett Le Man – Second Row
- Keith Gee – Second Row
- Greg Dowling – Prop
- Greg Conescu – Hooker
- Bryan Niebling – Prop
- Mark Hohn – Interchange
- Billy Noke – Interchange
- Craig Grauf – Interchange
- Wayne Bennett – Coach

== Personnel ==
Coaches
Name	No.	Coaching Years	Games	Wins	Losses	Draws	Winning %
Wayne Bennett	1	1988–2008, 2015–2018	671	433	226	12	64.5%
Craig Bellamy*	2	2002	2	1	1	0	50%
Ivan Henjak	3	2009–2010	51	27	24	0	52.9%
Anthony Griffin	4	2011–2014	101	54	46	1	53.5%
Anthony Seibold	5	2019–2020	38	14	23	1	36.8%
Peter Gentle*	6	2020	7	0	7	0	0%
Kevin Walters	7	2021–2024	102	52	49	1	51%
Michael Maguire	8	2025-Present	51	26	25	0	51%

Current personnel
Name	Position
Dave Donaghy	Chief Executive Officer
Michael Maguire	NRL Head Coach
Matt Friend	Chief Financial Officer
Dan Glass	Chief Commercial Officer
Kate Cullen	Chief of Staff & Strategy
Louise Lanigan	Company Secretary & Salary Cap Manager
Troy Thomson	General Manager - Football Operations
Simon Scanlan	General Manager - Recruitment & Pathways
Grant Williams	Head of Media & Public Relations
Nick Murray	Performance & Data Insights Manager
Nathan Baunach	General Manager - Community & Social Impact
Mark Henry	Head of Physical Preparation
David Ballard	Head of Performance
Nicholas Berlin	Performance Dietitian
Dr Matthew Hislop	Chief Medical Officer
Michael Kennedy	Academy Manager
Darius Boyd	NRLQ Head Coach
Scott Prince	NRLW Head Coach

== Statistics and records ==
In the club's history, the club has made a total of nine Grand Finals, winning seven and losing two; once to the North Queensland Cowboys in 2015, and once to the Penrith Panthers in 2023. They are one of only two clubs to have won the World Club Challenge twice, and were the first club to do so on British soil. They also won the now defunct Panasonic Cup in 1989.

Former team captain Darren Lockyer holds the record for the most First Grade games for the club (355). Lockyer also held the record for the most points scored for the club, tallying 1,171 since his debut in 1995, before Corey Parker overtook him in August 2015 with 1,222 career points for Brisbane Broncos. Darren Lockyer also holds the club record of 272 points in a season, having achieved this in 1998. Darren Lockyer was named Fullback in Queensland Rugby League's Team of the Century in 1998–2007 and he won 4 grand finals with the Brisbane Broncos (including a Clive Churchill Medal) and a World Cup title with Australia. He also won the Golden Boot Award for world's best player in this position before switching to Five-eighth.

Steve Renouf also shares the club record for the most tries in a season with Darren Smith at 23. After over a decade after Steve Renouf's move from the Brisbane Broncos to Wigan Warriors, he was still the club's all-time try scorer with a 142 career tries. Five times, he scored 4 tries in a single match from 1991 to 1998 and was known as one of the greatest centres the game has ever seen. In 2008, Steve Renouf was named centre in the Indigenous Team of the Century.

Lote Tuqiri's tally of 26 points from three tries and seven goals in a single match against the Northern Eagles remains the club record for most individual points in a game. He also won the 1999 Brisbane Broncos season's rookie of the year award.

Corey Parker holds the record for most goals in a game kicking ten in a round one clash of 2008, breaking the previous mark of nine kicked by Lockyer in 1998 and matched by Michael De Vere in 2001. He also scored a try on debut during 2001. Parker converted ten from ten goals in the Broncos 48–12 win over the Penrith Panthers in which Parker scored 24 points placing him in equal second place on the most points in a match tally. In 2013, Corey Parker was named Dally M Lock of the Year and in 2009 received the Broncos' Paul Morgan Award. Corey Parker also received the Paul Morgan Award yet again in 2013 and 2015. Six players have scored four tries in a match for the Brisbane Broncos including Steve Renouf (5 times), Wendell Sailor, Karmichael Hunt, Justin Hodges, Denan Kemp and former Australian Wallabies player, Israel Folau. Wendell Sailor has held the record for the most tries scored in a finals match (four tries against St. George Illawarra Dragons, Semi-final 2001, Brisbane won 44–28).

The most field goals in a match however hasn't been past one field goal which has been accomplished several times.

The club's biggest winning margin is 65 points, achieved in 2007 in a 71–6 victory over the Newcastle Knights. Their heaviest defeat is a 59–0 loss by the Sydney Roosters on 4 June 2020 . The club's highest winning margin in a Grand Final is by 26 points (38–12, against Canterbury Bulldogs, 1998).

In the 2017 NRL season, the Brisbane Broncos' highest try-scorer was former Gold Coast Titans centre James Roberts with 15 tries. The highest points-scorer was Jordan Kahu with 67 goals and 8 tries. The most metres run in the season was by Tautau Moga with 3410 metres.

=== Brisbane Broncos win–loss records ===
Active teams
Opponent	Played	Won	Drawn	Lost	Win %
Dolphins	8	6	0	2	75.00
Wests Tigers	35	25	1	9	71.43
Newcastle Knights	58	39	1	18	67.24
South Sydney Rabbitohs	53	35	1	17	66.04
Gold Coast Titans	41	27	0	14	65.85
North Queensland Cowboys	66	42	2	22	63.64
Cronulla-Sutherland Sharks	65	41	0	24	63.08
Canterbury-Bankstown Bulldogs	66	40	1	25	60.61
Canberra Raiders	60	35	1	24	58.33
Parramatta Eels	69	38	1	30	55.07
Warriors	53	28	1	24	52.83
Sydney Roosters	63	33	0	30	52.38
Penrith Panthers	67	37	1	29	52.22
St George Illawarra Dragons	48	25	0	23	52.08
Manly Warringah Sea Eagles	53	26	1	26	49.06
Melbourne Storm	62	17	1	44	27.42

Defunct teams
Opponent	Played	Won	Drawn	Lost	Win %
Western Reds	4	4	0	0	100.00
Adelaide Rams	3	3	0	0	100.00
South Queensland Crushers	2	2	0	0	100.00
Gold Coast Chargers	14	12	0	2	85.71
Western Suburbs Magpies	17	14	1	2	85.29
Northern Eagles	5	4	0	1	80.00
St George Dragons	15	10	0	5	66.66
Illawarra Steelers	14	9	0	5	64.28
Balmain Tigers	17	10	1	6	61.76
North Sydney Bears	18	11	0	7	61.11
Hunter Mariners	2	1	0	1	50.00

== Season summary ==
P=Premiers, R=Runners-up, M=Minor Premierships, F=Finals Appearance, W=Wooden Spoons (Brackets Represent Finals Games)
Competition	Games Played	Games Won	Games Drawn	Games Lost	Ladder Position	P	R	M	F	W	Coach(es)	Captain(s)	Details
1988 NSWRL season	22	14	0	8	7/16						Wayne Bennett	Wally Lewis	1988 Brisbane Broncos season
1989 NSWRL season	22 (1)	14 (0)	0 (0)	8 (1)	5/16						Wayne Bennett	Wally Lewis	1989 Brisbane Broncos season
1990 NSWRL season	22 (3)	16 (1)	1 (0)	5 (2)	2/16				?		Wayne Bennett	Gene Miles	1990 Brisbane Broncos season
1991 NSWRL season	22	13	0	9	7 / 16						Wayne Bennett	Gene Miles	1991 Brisbane Broncos season
1992 NSWRL season	22 (2)	18 (2)	0 (0)	4 (0)	1/16	?		?	?		Wayne Bennett	Allan Langer	1992 Brisbane Broncos season
1993 NSWRL season	22 (4)	16 (4)	0 (0)	6 (0)	5/16	?			?		Wayne Bennett	Allan Langer	1993 Brisbane Broncos season
1994 NSWRL season	22 (2)	13 (1)	1 (0)	8 (1)	5/16				?		Wayne Bennett	Allan Langer	1994 Brisbane Broncos season
1995 ARL season	22 (2)	17 (0)	0 (0)	5 (2)	3/20				?		Wayne Bennett	Allan Langer	1995 Brisbane Broncos season
1996 ARL season	21 (2)	17 (0)	0 (0)	4 (2)	2/20				?		Wayne Bennett	Allan Langer	1996 Brisbane Broncos season
1997 SL season	18 (2)	14 (2)	1 (0)	3 (0)	1/10	?		?	?		Wayne Bennett	Allan Langer	1997 Brisbane Broncos season
1998 NRL season	24 (4)	18 (3)	1 (0)	5 (1)	1/20	?		?	?		Wayne Bennett	Allan Langer	1998 Brisbane Broncos season
1999 NRL season	24 (1)	13 (0)	2 (0)	9 (1)	8/17				?		Wayne Bennett	Kevin Walters	1999 Brisbane Broncos season
2000 NRL season	26 (3)	18 (3)	2 (0)	6 (0)	1/14	?		?	?		Wayne Bennett	Kevin Walters	2000 Brisbane Broncos season
2001 NRL season	26 (3)	14 (1)	1 (0)	11 (2)	5/14				?		Wayne Bennett	Gorden Tallis	2001 Brisbane Broncos season
2002 NRL season	24 (2)	16 (1)	1 (0)	7 (1)	3/15				?		Wayne Bennett and Craig Bellamy	Gorden Tallis	2002 Brisbane Broncos season
2003 NRL season	24 (1)	12 (0)	0 (0)	12 (1)	8/15				?		Wayne Bennett	Gorden Tallis	2003 Brisbane Broncos season
2004 NRL season	24 (2)	16 (0)	1 (0)	7 (2)	3/15				?		Wayne Bennett	Gorden Tallis	2004 Brisbane Broncos season
2005 NRL season	24 (2)	15 (0)	0 (0)	9 (2)	3/15				?		Wayne Bennett	Darren Lockyer	2005 Brisbane Broncos season
2006 NRL season	24 (4)	14 (3)	0 (0)	10 (1)	3/15	?			?		Wayne Bennett	Darren Lockyer	2006 Brisbane Broncos season
2007 NRL season	24 (1)	11 (0)	0 (0)	13 (1)	8/16				?		Wayne Bennett	Darren Lockyer	2007 Brisbane Broncos season
2008 NRL season	24 (2)	14 (1)	1 (0)	9 (1)	5/16				?		Wayne Bennett	Darren Lockyer	2008 Brisbane Broncos season
2009 NRL season	24 (3)	14 (2)	0 (0)	10 (1)	6/16				?		Ivan Henjak	Darren Lockyer	2009 Brisbane Broncos season
2010 NRL season	24	11	0	13	10/16						Ivan Henjak	Darren Lockyer	2010 Brisbane Broncos season
2011 NRL season	24 (3)	18 (2)	0 (0)	6 (1)	3/16				?		Anthony Griffin	Darren Lockyer	2011 Brisbane Broncos season
2012 NRL season	24 (1)	12 (0)	0 (0)	12 (1)	8/16				?		Anthony Griffin	Sam Thaiday	2012 Brisbane Broncos season
2013 NRL season	24	10	1	13	12 / 16						Anthony Griffin	Sam Thaiday	2013 Brisbane Broncos season
2014 NRL season	24 (1)	12 (0)	0 (0)	12 (1)	8/16				?		Anthony Griffin	Corey Parker and Justin Hodges	2014 Brisbane Broncos season
2015 NRL season	24	17	0	7	2/16		?		?		Wayne Bennett	Justin Hodges	2015 Brisbane Broncos season
2016 NRL season	24 (3)	15	0	9	5/16				?		Wayne Bennett	Corey Parker	2016 Brisbane Broncos season
2017 NRL season	24 (3)	16	0	8	3/16				?		Wayne Bennett	Darius Boyd	2017 Brisbane Broncos season
2018 NRL season	24 (1)	15	0	9	6/16				?		Wayne Bennett	Darius Boyd	2018 Brisbane Broncos season
2019 NRL season	24 (1)	11	1	13	8/16				?		Anthony Seibold	Darius Boyd	2019 Brisbane Broncos season
2020 NRL season	20	3	0	17	16/16					?	Anthony Seibold and Peter Gentle	Alex Glenn	2020 Brisbane Broncos season
2021 NRL season	24	7	0	17	14/16						Kevin Walters	Alex Glenn	2021 Brisbane Broncos season
2022 NRL season	24	13	0	11	9/16						Kevin Walters	Adam Reynolds	2022 Brisbane Broncos season
2023 NRL season	24 (3)	18 (2)	0	6 (1)	2/17		?		?		Kevin Walters	Adam Reynolds	2023 Brisbane Broncos season
2024 NRL season	24	10	0	14	12/17						Kevin Walters	Adam Reynolds	2024 Brisbane Broncos season
2025 NRL Season	24 (3)	15	0	9	4/17	?			?		Michael Maguire	Adam Reynolds	2025 Brisbane Broncos season

=== Finals appearances ===
29 (1990, 1992, 1993, 1994, 1995, 1996, 1997, 1998, 1999, 2000, 2001, 2002, 2003, 2004, 2005, 2006, 2007, 2008, 2009, 2011, 2012, 2014, 2015, 2016, 2017, 2018, 2019, 2023, 2025)

== Honours ==
Premierships
Competition	Level	Wins	Years Won
National Rugby League (NSWRL until–1994, ARL 1995–1996, Super League 1997, NRL 1998–present)	First grade	7	1992, 1993, 1997, 1998, 2000, 2006, 2025
NRL Women's Premiership	First grade	4	2018, 2019, 2020, 2025
Other titles and honours
World Club Challenge	Champions	2	1992, 1997
Panasonic Cup	Midweek Cup	1	1989
Challenge Cup	Preseason Cup	2	1991, 1995
NRL Pre-season Challenge	Preseason	2	2024, 2025
Finishing positions
National Rugby League (NSWRL until–1994, ARL 1995–1997, Super League 1997, NRL 1998–present)	Minor premiership	4	1992, 1997, 1998, 2000
National Rugby League (NSWRL until–1994, ARL 1995–1997, Super League 1997, NRL 1998–present)	Grand Finalist	2	2015, 2023
National Rugby League (NSWRL until–1994, ARL 1995–1997, Super League 1997, NRL 1998–present)	Wooden spoon	1	2020
NRL Women's Premiership	Minor premiers	4	2018, 2019, 2020, 2021
NRL Women's Premiership	Grand Finalist	1	2026
NRL Under-20s	Grand Finalist	2	2008, 2014

== Club Rivalries ==
=== North Queensland Cowboys ===
Brisbane's biggest rivals are the North Queensland Cowboys. The two clubs had a long-standing 'sibling rivalry' with North Queensland characterized as the underdog. Brisbane initially were dominant in the fixture with Brisbane going undefeated against North Queensland for the first nine years until North Queensland recorded their first ever victory in the 2004 elimination final defeating Brisbane 10–0.

The rivalry reached new heights after North Queensland won their first premiership, beating Brisbane at the 2015 Grand Final at Stadium Australia. Considered one of the greatest grand finals of all time, the win established North Queensland as competitive equals. Between 2015 and 2017 a staggering three of five games played between the two clubs led to a Golden Point finish. In the final round of the 2020 NRL season, North Queensland condemned Brisbane to their first ever Wooden Spoon. Brisbane needed to win the match to overtake Canterbury-Bankstown but lost the match.

It is regarded as one of the greatest modern sports rivalries earning the nickname of the "Queensland derby".

=== Gold Coast Titans ===
The match between Brisbane and the Gold Coast is known as the South Queensland Derby. The media and supporters of both club's have described this fixture as "Big Brother against Little Brother". Brisbane are the more successful team in the fixture with the Gold Coast only defeating Brisbane eleven times since 2007. The two club's have only met in two finals matches, the first being in 2009 when Brisbane won 40–32. The other time being in 2016 when the Gold Coast reached the finals by default due to Parramatta's salary cap points deduction. Brisbane won the match 44–28.

The Gold Coast are geographically the closest club to Brisbane. Brisbane previously enjoyed derbies with the Gold Coast Chargers, until the Chargers exited the competition at the end of 1998 season, returning as the Gold Coast Titans in 2007 and before that with the Gold Coast Seagulls and Gold Coast-Tweed Giants. In the 2021 NRL season, Brisbane recorded the biggest ever comeback in their history by defeating the Gold Coast 36–28 after being down 22–0.

=== Melbourne Storm ===
Since the 2006 NRL Grand Final where Brisbane edged out Melbourne 15–8, a rivalry still continues today between the two clubs. The two sides have played each other in multiple finals matches. Adding to this, both Brisbane and Melbourne players usually feature heavily in Queensland's annual State of Origin side. Since the 2006 decider, Brisbane have played Melbourne on thirty-four occasions and only won five times. In round 27 of the 2023 NRL season, the two sides met in the final round of the regular campaign. Brisbane and Melbourne both rested regular players as each team had already qualified for the finals. Melbourne won 32–22 and by the end of the round, Brisbane missed out on their first Minor Premiership win since 2000. The two sides would meet the following week in the 2023 qualifying final with Brisbane defeating Melbourne 26–0 to book a place in the preliminary final. It was the first time Brisbane had beaten Melbourne at Lang Park since 2009 and the first time that they had defeated Melbourne in 14 attempts. The rivalry culminated in the 2025 NRL Grand Final, where Brisbane produced a composed and decisive performance to defeat Melbourne and claim their first premiership since 2006. The result was seen as a defining moment in the Broncos’ modern history, reaffirming the club’s status as a dominant force in the competition and ending a prolonged period of Melbourne ascendancy in their finals encounters.

=== Dolphins ===
"The Battle for Brisbane" is a new rivalry which began with the Dolphins' admission as the second Brisbane club in 2023. This marked the first time that Brisbane has had two professional rugby league teams since the demise of the South Queensland Crushers in 1997. In round 4 of the 2023 NRL season, the two sides played against each other for the first time. In a match which saw both sides take the lead, Brisbane would go on to win 18–12 in front of 51,047 fans. This was the biggest crowd at Lang Park for a regular season game in its history.

== Club affiliations ==
The Brisbane Broncos have three split feeder clubs from the Queensland Cup: Northern Suburbs Devils, Souths Logan Magpies and Wynnum-Manly Seagulls. Former feeder clubs of the Broncos are the now-defunct Aspley Broncos and Toowoomba Clydesdales, active clubs Central Queensland Capras, who switched to The Dolphins, Ipswich Jets who switched to Newcastle Knights, Redcliffe Dolphins who switched to the Warriors, and Burleigh Bears who switched to the Gold Coast Titans.

== Women's team ==
In 2017, the Brisbane Broncos launched a bid to enter a team in the inaugural NRL Women's Premiership in 2018. On 27 March 2018, the club won a license to participate in the inaugural NRL Women's season, on the back of a strong bid which included the NRL's desire for a geographical spread. Paul Dyer was named as the coach of the women's side, but stepped down after the inaugural season to concentrate on his role as game development manager. Kelvin Wright was named his replacement in May 2019.

In June 2018, Ali Brigginshaw, Brittany Breayley, Heather Ballinger, Teuila Fotu-Moala and Caitlyn Moran were unveiled as the club's first five signings. Tain Drinkwater was also appointed the CEO of the team.

The club won the inaugural NRL Women's Premiership title by defeating the Sydney Roosters by 34–12 in the 2018 NRL Women's Premiership Grand Final.

The Brisbane Broncos went back-to-back in 2019, with a dominant 30-6 win over the St George Illawarra Dragons.

In 2020, a year the competition was impacted by COVID 19, the Broncos made it back-to-back titles, again defeating the Sydney Roosters in the decider, winning their third title, 20 points to 10.

In 2025, the Broncos defeated the Sydney Roosters 22 points to 18 in the NRLW Grand Final at Stadium Australia, to win their fourth title.

== See also ==
- Sport in Queensland
- Rugby league in Queensland
